= 2017 Cincinnati Bengals season =

50th season in franchise history

- Owner: Mike Brown
- Head coach: Marvin Lewis
- Home stadium: Paul Brown Stadium

Results
- Record: 7–9
- Division place: 3rd AFC North
- Playoffs: Did not qualify
- Pro Bowlers: WR A. J. Green; DT Geno Atkins

Uniform
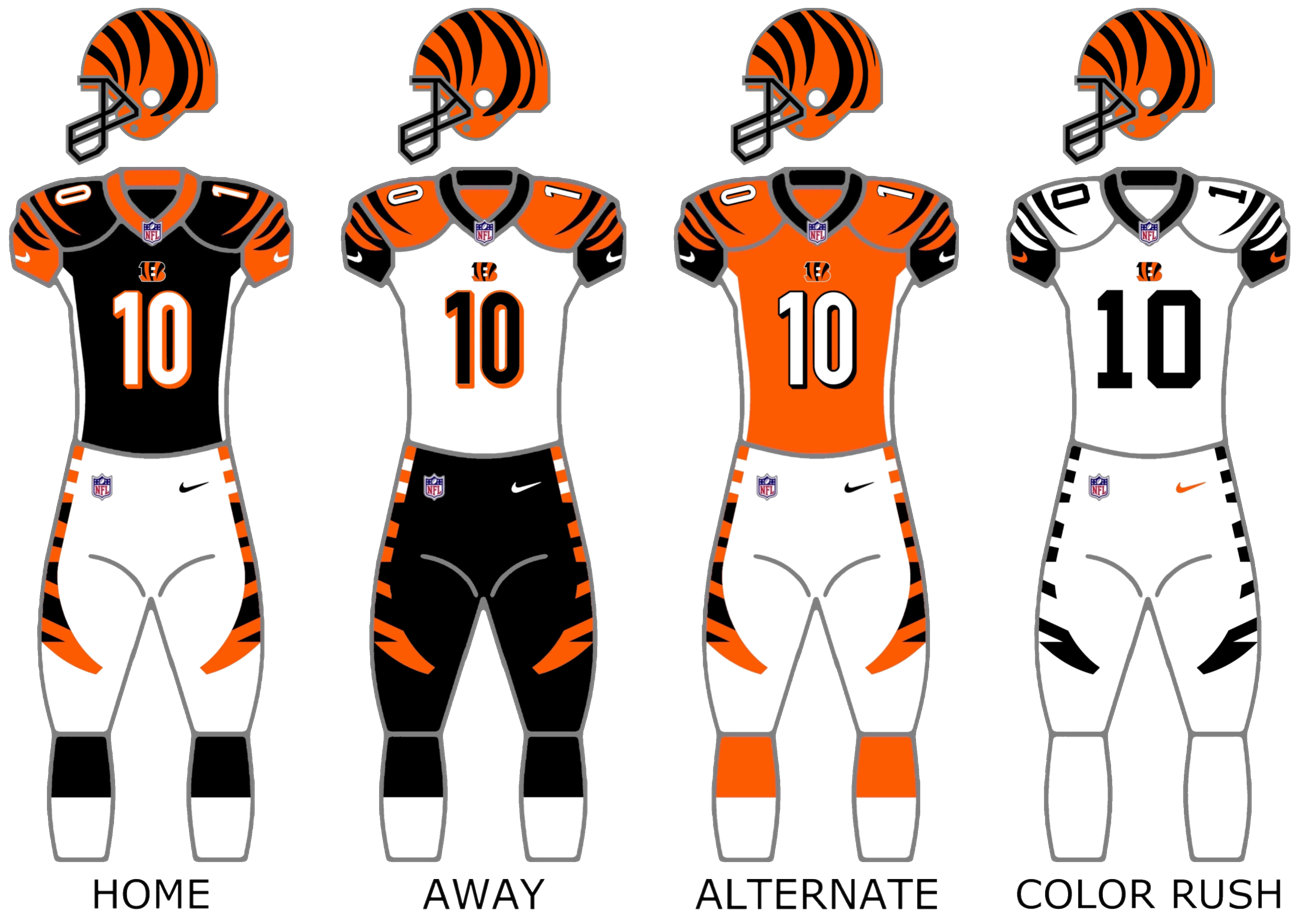

The 2017 season was the Cincinnati Bengals' 48th season in the National Football League (NFL), their 50th overall and their 15th under head coach Marvin Lewis. After starting 0–2, scoring only 9 points, and not scoring any touchdowns in their first two games, the Bengals fired offensive coordinator Ken Zampese. Quarterbacks coach Bill Lazor was promoted to offensive coordinator to replace Zampese. The Bengals suffered back to back losing seasons for the first time since 2007–2008. However, the Bengals were able to knock off two teams contending for the playoffs at the end of their season, the Detroit Lions in Week 16, and the Baltimore Ravens in Week 17 which allowed the Buffalo Bills reach the postseason for the first time since 1999.

== Offseason ==
=== Free agents ===
==== Unrestricted ====
Position	Player	2017 Team	Date signed	Contract
WR	Brandon LaFell	Cincinnati Bengals	March 8	2 years, $10 million
CB	Dre Kirkpatrick	Cincinnati Bengals	March 9	5 years, $52.5 million
LB	Karlos Dansby	Arizona Cardinals	March 9	1 year, $2 million
OT	Andrew Whitworth	Los Angeles Rams	March 9	3 years, $36 million
OG	Kevin Zeitler	Cleveland Browns	March 9	5 years, $60 million
DT	Domata Peko	Denver Broncos	March 11	2 years, $7.5 million
RB	Rex Burkhead	New England Patriots	March 14	1 year, $3.15 million
CB	Chykie Brown			
DE	Margus Hunt	Indianapolis Colts	March 14	2 years, $4.1 million
RB	Cedric Peerman	Cincinnati Bengals	March 23	1 year, $1.15 million

==== Restricted and Exclusive-Rights ====
Position	Player	Tag	2017 Team	Date signed	Contract
C	T.J. Johnson	RFA	Cincinnati Bengals	March 17	2 years, $3.475M

=== Signings ===
Position	Player	2016 team	Date signed	Contract
LB	Kevin Minter	Arizona Cardinals	March 20	1 year, $4.25 million
OT	Andre Smith	Minnesota Vikings	March 14	1 year, $3.25 million

=== Departures ===
Position	Player	2017 team	Contract
WR	James Wright		
LB	Rey Maualuga	Miami Dolphins	1 year, $980K
DT	Brandon Thompson		
DE	Wallace Gilberry		
OT	Eric Winston		

== Draft ==
2017 Cincinnati Bengals draft
Round	Pick	Player	Position	College	Notes
1	9	John Ross	WR	Washington	
2	48	Joe Mixon *	RB	Oklahoma	
3	73	Jordan Willis	DE	Kansas State	
4	116	Carl Lawson	DE	Auburn	
4	128	Josh Malone	WR	Tennessee	
4	138	Ryan Glasgow	DT	Michigan	Compensatory pick
5	153	Jake Elliott *	K	Memphis	
5	176	J. J. Dielman	C	Utah	Compensatory pick
6	193	Jordan Evans	LB	Oklahoma	
6	207	Brandon Wilson	CB	Houston	Compensatory pick
7	251	Mason Schreck	TE	Buffalo	Compensatory pick
Made roster † Pro Football Hall of Fame * Made at least one Pro Bowl during career

== Staff ==
2017 Cincinnati Bengals staff
Front office: President/general manager – Mike Brown; Senior vice president of player personnel – Pete Brown; Executive vice president – Katie Blackburn; Vice president of player personnel – Paul H. Brown; Director of player personnel – Duke Tobin; Head coaches: Head coach – Marvin Lewis; Assistant head coach/offensive line – Paul Alexander; Offensive coaches: Offensive coordinator – Ken Zampese (fired Sept 15, 2017); Quarterbacks/interim offensive coordinator - Bill Lazor; Running backs – Kyle Caskey; Wide receivers – James Urban; Tight ends – Jonathan Hayes; Offensive assistant/wide receivers – Dan Pitcher; Offensive quality control/offensive line – Robert Couch	Defensive coaches: Defensive coordinator – Paul Guenther; Defensive line – Jacob Burney; Linebackers – Jim Haslett; Secondary – Kevin Coyle; Secondary – Robert Livingston; Defensive quality control/assistant linebackers – David Lippincott; Defensive quality control/defensive line – Marcus Lewis; Special teams coaches: Special teams coordinator – Darrin Simmons; Assistant special teams/defensive quality control – Brayden Coombs; Strength and conditioning: Head strength and conditioning – Chip Morton; Assistant strength and conditioning – Jeff Friday

== Final roster ==
2017 Cincinnati Bengals roster
Quarterbacks (QB): 14 Andy Dalton; 5 A. J. McCarron; Running backs (RB): 25 Giovani Bernard; 23 Brian Hill; 28 Joe Mixon; 39 Jarveon Williams; Wide receivers (WR): 83 Tyler Boyd; 16 Cody Core; 12 Alex Erickson; 18 A. J. Green; 11 Brandon LaFell; 80 Josh Malone; Tight ends (TE): 82 Cethan Carter; 89 Ryan Hewitt; 81 Tyler Kroft; 87 C. J. Uzomah	Offensive linemen (OL): 61 Russell Bodine C; 65 Clint Boling G; 66 Trey Hopkins G; 72 Justin Murray T; 70 Cedric Ogbuehi T; 76 Kent Perkins T; 62 Alex Redmond G; 63 Christian Westerman G; 73 Eric Winston T; Defensive linemen (DL): 97 Geno Atkins DT; 99 Andrew Billings DT; 96 Carlos Dunlap DE; 98 Ryan Glasgow DT; 90 Michael Johnson DE; 92 Pat Sims DT; 94 Chris Smith DE; 68 Josh Tupou DT; 75 Jordan Willis DE	Linebackers (LB): 52 Brandon Bell OLB; 55 Vontaze Burfict OLB; 50 Jordan Evans OLB; 58 Carl Lawson OLB; 56 Hardy Nickerson Jr. MLB; 57 Vincent Rey MLB; Defensive backs (DB): 21 Darqueze Dennard CB; 42 Clayton Fejedelem FS; 43 George Iloka SS; 22 William Jackson CB; 27 Dre Kirkpatrick CB; 29 Tony McRae CB; 20 KeiVarae Russell CB; 26 Josh Shaw CB; 40 Brandon Wilson SS; 36 Shawn Williams FS; Special teams (ST): 4 Randy Bullock K; 46 Clark Harris LS; 10 Kevin Huber P	Practice squad: 53 Carl Bradford OLB; 7 Jon Brown K; 47 Connor Harris MLB; 77 Javarius Leamon T; 67 Oni Omoile G; 84 Scott Orndoff TE; 31 Sojourn Shelton CB; 37 Robenson Therezie SS; 17 Kermit Whitfield WR; 69 DeShawn Williams DT; Reserve: 33 Tra Carson RB (IR); 6 Jeff Driskel QB (IR); 85 Tyler Eifert TE (IR); 74 Jake Fisher LT (NF-Ill.); 32 Jeremy Hill RB (IR); 60 T. J. Johnson G (IR); 24 Adam Jones CB (IR); 51 Kevin Minter MLB (IR); 30 Cedric Peerman RB (IR); 15 John Ross WR (IR); 86 Mason Schreck TE (IR); 71 Andre Smith T (IR); 59 Nick Vigil OLB (IR); Rookies in italics 53 active, 13 reserve, 10 practice squad

== Preseason ==
Week	Date	Opponent	Result	Record	Venue	Recap
1	August 11	Tampa Bay Buccaneers	W 23–12	1–0	Paul Brown Stadium	Recap
2	August 19	Kansas City Chiefs	L 12–30	1–1	Paul Brown Stadium	Recap
3	August 27	at Washington Redskins	L 17–23	1–2	FedExField	Recap
4	August 31	at Indianapolis Colts	L 6–7	1–3	Lucas Oil Stadium	Recap

== Regular season ==
=== Schedule ===
Week	Date	Opponent	Result	Record	Venue	Recap
1	September 10	**Baltimore Ravens**	**L** 0–20	0–1	Paul Brown Stadium	Recap
2	September 14	Houston Texans	**L** 9–13	0–2	Paul Brown Stadium	Recap
3	September 24	at Green Bay Packers	**L** 24–27 (OT)	0–3	Lambeau Field	Recap
4	October 1	at **Cleveland Browns**	**W** 31–7	1–3	FirstEnergy Stadium	Recap
5	October 8	Buffalo Bills	**W** 20–16	2–3	Paul Brown Stadium	Recap
6	Bye					
7	October 22	at **Pittsburgh Steelers**	**L** 14–29	2–4	Heinz Field	Recap
8	October 29	Indianapolis Colts	**W** 24–23	3–4	Paul Brown Stadium	Recap
9	November 5	at Jacksonville Jaguars	**L** 7–23	3–5	EverBank Field	Recap
10	November 12	at Tennessee Titans	**L** 20–24	3–6	Nissan Stadium	Recap
11	November 19	at Denver Broncos	**W** 20–17	4–6	Sports Authority Field at Mile High	Recap
12	November 26	**Cleveland Browns**	**W** 30–16	5–6	Paul Brown Stadium	Recap
13	December 4	**Pittsburgh Steelers**	**L** 20–23	5–7	Paul Brown Stadium	Recap
14	December 10	Chicago Bears	**L** 7–33	5–8	Paul Brown Stadium	Recap
15	December 17	at Minnesota Vikings	**L** 7–34	5–9	U.S. Bank Stadium	Recap
16	December 24	Detroit Lions	**W** 26–17	6–9	Paul Brown Stadium	Recap
17	December 31	at **Baltimore Ravens**	**W** 31–27	7–9	M&T Bank Stadium	Recap

Note: Intra-division opponents are in bold text.

=== Game summaries ===
==== Week 1: vs. Baltimore Ravens ====
Week One: Baltimore Ravens at Cincinnati Bengals – Game summary

Quarter	1	2	3	4	Total
**Ravens**	3	14	3	0	**20**
Bengals	0	0	0	0	**0**

at Paul Brown Stadium, Cincinnati, Ohio

- Date: September 10
- Game time: 1:00 p.m. EDT
- Game weather: 68 °F (20 °C), sunny
- Game attendance: 55,254
- Referee: Walt Coleman
- TV announcers (CBS): Spero Dedes, Adam Archuleta and Melanie Collins
- Recap, Gamebook

Game information

**First quarter**

- BAL – Justin Tucker 25-yard field goal, 4:47. Ravens 3–0. **Drive: 13 plays, 57 yards, 7:54.**

**Second quarter**

- BAL – Jeremy Maclin 48-yard pass from Joe Flacco (Justin Tucker kick), 2:00. Ravens 10–0. **Drive: 7 plays, 76 yards, 3:54.**
- BAL – Terrance West 2-yard run (Justin Tucker kick), 1:31. Ravens 17–0. **Drive: 1 play, 2 yards, 0:03.**

**Third quarter**

- BAL – Justin Tucker 25-yard field goal, 1:09. Ravens 20–0. **Drive: 17 plays, 81 yards, 9:38.**

**Fourth quarter**

- No scoring plays

**Top passers**

- BAL – Joe Flacco – 9/17, 121 yards, TD, INT
- CIN – Andy Dalton – 16/31, 170 yards, 4 INT

**Top rushers**

- BAL – Terrance West – 19 rushes, 80 yards, TD
- CIN – Giovani Bernard – 7 rushes, 40 yards

**Top receivers**

- BAL – Jeremy Maclin – 2 receptions, 56 yards, TD
- CIN – A. J. Green – 5 receptions, 74 yards

**Top tacklers**

- BAL – Tony Jefferson - 5 tackles, 4 assists
- CIN – Vincent Rey - 6 tackles, 5 assists

The Bengals started the season at home against the Ravens. In the first quarter, the Ravens scored as Justin Tucker kicked a 25-yard field goal to make it 3–0. They would increase their lead in the second quarter when Joe Flacco found Jeremy Maclin on a 48-yard pass to make it 10–0. This would be followed up by a 2-yard touchdown run by Terrence West to make the score 17–0 at halftime. In the third quarter, the Ravens would go back to work with Tucker kicking yet another 25-yard field goal to make the score 20–0. A scoreless fourth quarter made this the eventual final score of the game.

With the loss, the Bengals started their season 0–1. This is the team's first shut-out loss at home since 2001.

Andy Dalton set a new career high for total turnovers in a game with 5 (4 interceptions, 1 lost fumble)

==== Week 2: vs. Houston Texans ====
Week Two: Houston Texans at Cincinnati Bengals – Game summary

Quarter	1	2	3	4	Total
**Texans**	3	7	0	3	**13**
Bengals	0	6	3	0	**9**

at Paul Brown Stadium, Cincinnati, Ohio

- Date: September 14
- Game time: 8:25 pm. EDT
- Game weather: 69 °F (21 °C), mostly cloudy
- Game attendance: 52,942
- Referee: Clete Blakeman
- TV announcers (NFLN): Mike Tirico, Cris Collinsworth and Heather Cox
- Recap, Gamebook

Game information

**First quarter**

- HOU – Kaʻimi Fairbairn 26-yard field goal, 1:32. Texans 3–0. **Drive: 6 plays, 12 yards, 3:04.**

**Second quarter**

- CIN – Randy Bullock 39-yard field goal, 13:48. Tied 3–3. **Drive: 5 plays, 43 yards, 2:44.**
- HOU – Deshaun Watson 49-yard run (Kaʻimi Fairbairn kick), 0:50. Texans 10–3. **Drive: 9 plays, 94 yards, 3:40.**
- CIN – Randy Bullock 29-yard field goal, 0:06. Texans 10–6. **Drive: 6 plays, 64 yards, 0:48.**

**Third quarter**

- CIN – Randy Bullock 30-yard field goal, 6:30. Texans 10–9. **Drive: 15 plays, 63 yards, 8:24.**

**Fourth quarter**

- HOU – Kaʻimi Fairbairn 42-yard field goal, 2:01. Texans 13–9. **Drive: 13 plays, 66 yards, 6:19.**

**Top passers**

- HOU – Deshaun Watson – 15/24, 125 yards
- CIN – Andy Dalton – 20/35, 224 yards

**Top rushers**

- HOU – Deshaun Watson – 5 carries, 67 yards, TD
- CIN – Joe Mixon – 9 carries, 36 yards

**Top receivers**

- HOU – DeAndre Hopkins – 7 receptions, 73 yards
- CIN – A. J. Green – 5 receptions, 67 yards

**Top tacklers**

- HOU –Kareem Jackson – 7 tackles
- CIN – Vincent Rey– 11 tackles

The Bengals stayed home for a Thursday Night duel against the Texans. In the first quarter the Texans jumped out to an early lead when Kaʻimi Fairbairn kicked a 26-yard field goal to make it 3–0. The Bengals tied it up in the second quarter when Randy Bullock kicked a 39-yard field goal to make it 3–3. Though the Texans would then retake the lead when DeShaun Watson ran for a 49-yard touchdown to make it 10–3. Bullock closed out the first half scoring with a 29-yard field goal to make it 10–6 at halftime. In the third quarter, the Bengals went back to work when Bullock kicked a 30-yard field goal to get his team within a point making the score 10–9. In the fourth quarter, the Texans moved ahead by 4 after Fairbairn kicked a 42-yard field goal to make it 13–9. The Bengals tried to come back with seconds left but after a failed fourth down conversion attempt, the Texans were able to seal the victory.

With the loss, the Bengals dropped to 0–2. This would be the team's first 0–2 start since 2008. They are also the first team to open a season with two home games without scoring a touchdown since the 1939 Eagles.

==== Week 3: at Green Bay Packers ====
Week Three: Cincinnati Bengals at Green Bay Packers – Game summary

Quarter	1	2	3	4	OT	Total
Bengals	7	14	0	3	0	**24**
**Packers**	7	0	7	10	3	**27**

at Lambeau Field, Green Bay, Wisconsin

- Date: September 24
- Game time: 4:25 pm. EDT/3:25 p.m. CDT
- Game weather: 89 °F (32 °C), sunny
- Game attendance: 78,323
- Referee: Gene Steratore
- TV announcers (CBS): Jim Nantz, Tony Romo and Tracy Wolfson
- Recap, Gamebook

Game information

First quarter

- CIN – A. J. Green 10-yard pass from Andy Dalton (Randy Bullock kick), 9:40. Bengals 7–0. **Drive: 10 plays, 79 yards, 5:20.**
- GB – Lance Kendricks 1-yard pass from Aaron Rodgers (Mason Crosby kick), 7:51. Tied 7–7. **Drive: 6 plays, 60 yards, 1:54.**

Second quarter

- CIN – Giovani Bernard 6-yard pass from Andy Dalton (Randy Bullock kick), 12:35. Bengals 14–7. **Drive: 9 plays, 60 yards, 4:49.**
- CIN – William Jackson III 75-yard interception return, 12:35. Bengals 21–7.

Third quarter

- GB – Jordy Nelson 1-yard pass from Aaron Rodgers (Mason Crosby kick), 10:00. Bengals 21–14. **Drive: 8 plays, 75 yards, 5:06.**

Fourth quarter

- GB – Mason Crosby 28-yard field goal, 14:47. Bengals 21–17. **Drive: 8 plays, 52 yards, 2:58.**
- CIN – Randy Bullock 46-yard field goal, 3:51. Bengals 24–17. **Drive: 11 plays, 63 yards, 5:57.**
- GB – Jordy Nelson 3-yard pass from Aaron Rodgers (Mason Crosby kick), 0:21. Tied 24–24. **Drive: 12 plays, 75 yards, 3:29.**

Overtime

- GB – Mason Crosby 27-yard field goal, 6:26. Packers 27–24. **Drive: 5 plays, 70 yards, 1:17.**

Top passers

- CIN – Andy Dalton – 21/27, 212 yards, 2 TD
- GB – Aaron Rodgers – 28/42, 313 yards, 3 TD, INT

Top rushers

- CIN – Joe Mixon – 18 rushes, 62 yards
- GB – Ty Montgomery – 12 rushes, 35 yards

Top receivers

- CIN – A. J. Green – 10 receptions, 111 yards, TD
- GB – Geronimo Allison – 6 receptions, 122 yards

The Bengals traveled Lambeau Field to take on the Packers. In the first quarter, the Bengals scored first when Andy Dalton found A. J. Green on a 10-yard pass to make it 7–0. Though the Packers would respond by tying the game up at 7–7 when Aaron Rodgers found Lance Kendricks on a 1-yard pass. In the second quarter, it was all Bengals when Dalton found Giovani Bernard on a 6-yard pass to make it 14–7. This would be followed up by Cornerback William Jackson III intercepting Rodgers and returning it 75 yards for a touchdown to make it 21–7 at halftime. In the third quarter, the Packers got to work as Rodgers would find Jordy Nelson on a 1-yard pass to make it 21–14. They would draw closer in the fourth quarter after Mason Crosby kicked a 28-yard field goal to make it 21–17. The Bengals then moved ahead by a touchdown again after Randy Bullock kicked a 46-yard field goal to make it 24–17. However, the Packers tied it up later on when Rodgers and Nelson connected again this time on a 3-yard pass to make it 24–24. In overtime, the Bengals won the toss but went three-and-out. After the Packers got the ball, Rodgers found Geronimo Allison on a 72-yard pass that set up Mason Crosby's game-winning field goal from 27 yards out to make the final score 27–24.

With the loss, the Bengals fell to 0–3. The team would face their first 0–3 start since 2008.

==== Week 4: at Cleveland Browns ====
Week Four: Cincinnati Bengals at Cleveland Browns – Game summary

Quarter	1	2	3	4	Total
**Bengals**	0	21	10	0	**31**
Browns	0	0	0	7	**7**

at FirstEnergy Stadium, Cleveland, Ohio

- Date: October 1
- Game time: 1:00 pm. EDT
- Game weather: 63 °F (17 °C), sunny
- Game attendance: 67,431
- Referee: Ronald Torbert
- TV announcers (CBS): Spero Dedes and Adam Archuleta
- Recap, Gamebook

Game information

**First quarter**

- No scoring plays.

**Second quarter**

- CIN – A. J. Green 7-yard pass from Andy Dalton (Randy Bullock kick), 15:00. Bengals 7–0. **Drive: 9 plays, 35 yards, 5:21.**
- CIN – Tyler Kroft 3-yard pass from Andy Dalton (Randy Bullock kick), 2:36. Bengals 14–0. **Drive: 13 plays, 88 yards, 7:28.**
- CIN – Giovani Bernard 61-yard pass from Andy Dalton (Randy Bullock kick), 1:21. Bengals 21–0. **Drive: 3 plays, 83 yards, 0:53.**

**Third quarter**

- CIN – Randy Bullock 41-yard field goal, 11:32. Bengals 24–0. **Drive: 10 plays, 52 yards, 3:32.**
- CIN – Tyler Kroft 16-yard pass from Andy Dalton (Randy Bullock kick), 3:42. Bengals 31–0. **Drive: 10 plays, 83 yards, 6:20.**

**Fourth quarter**

- CLE – Duke Johnson 1-yard run (Zane Gonzalez kick), 1:56. Bengals 31–7. **Drive: 12 plays, 63 yards, 4:36.**

**Top passers**

- CIN – Andy Dalton – 25/30, 286 yards, 4 TD
- CLE – DeShone Kizer – 16/34, 118 yards, INT

**Top rushers**

- CIN – Andy Dalton – 4 rushes, 29 yards
- CLE – Isaiah Crowell – 7 rushes, 20 yards

**Top receivers**

- CIN – Tyler Kroft – 6 receptions, 68 yards, 2 TD
- CLE – Ricardo Louis – 5 receptions, 64 yards

**Top tacklers**

- CIN – Nick Vigil - 7 tackles, 4 assists
- CLE – Joe Schobert - 4 tackles, 7 assists

After a tough loss, the Bengals traveled to Cleveland to take on the Browns in Round 1 of Battle of Ohio. After a scoreless first quarter, the Bengals got to work in the second quarter when Andy Dalton found A. J. Green on a 7-yard pass to make the score 7–0. Dalton would then find Tyler Kroft on a 3-yard pass to make it 14–0. Then Dalton would find Giovani Bernard on a 61-yard pass to make it 21–0 at halftime. In the third quarter, the Bengals increased their lead when Randy Bullock nailed a 41-yard field goal to make it 24–0. This would be followed by Dalton's fourth touchdown pass of the day as he found Kroft again this time on a 16-yard pass to make it 31–0. In the fourth quarter, the Browns got the final points of the game when Duke Johnson ran for a 1-yard touchdown making the final score 31–7.

With the win, the Bengals improved to 1–3.

==== Week 5: vs. Buffalo Bills ====
Week Five: Buffalo Bills at Cincinnati Bengals – Game summary

Quarter	1	2	3	4	Total
Bills	3	7	3	3	**16**
**Bengals**	7	3	0	10	**20**

at Paul Brown Stadium, Cincinnati, Ohio

- Date: October 8
- Game time: 1:00 pm. EDT
- Game weather: 63 °F (17 °C), light rain
- Game attendance: 52,367
- Referee: Pete Morelli
- TV announcers (CBS): Tom McCarthy, Steve Beuerlein and Steve Tasker
- Recap, Gamebook

Game information

**First quarter**

- CIN – A. J. Green 77-yard pass from Andy Dalton (Randy Bullock kick), 11:39. Bengals 7–0. **Drive: 1 play, 77 yards, 0:10.**
- BUF – Stephen Hauschka 31-yard field goal, 0:15. Bengals 7–3. **Drive: 10 plays, 72 yards, 4:10.**

**Second quarter**

- CIN – Bullock 30-yard field goal, 9:05. Bengals 10–3. **Drive: 12 plays, 63 yards, 6:09.**
- BUF – Brandon Tate 12-yard pass from Tyrod Taylor (Hauschka kick), 3:15. Tie 10–10. **Drive: 6 plays, 23 yards, 1:34.**

**Third quarter**

- BUF – Hauschka 38-yard field goal, 1:59. Bills 13–10. **Drive: 9 plays, 51 yards, 4:40.**

**Fourth quarter**

- CIN – Joe Mixon 5-yard run (Bullock kick), 15:00. Bengals 17–13. **Drive: 7 plays, 75 yards, 1:59.**
- BUF – Hauschka 28-yard field goal, 9:03. Bengals 17–16. **Drive: 4 plays, 2 yards, 1:38.**
- CIN – Bullock 29-yard field goal, 3:37. Bengals 20–16. **Drive: 11 plays, 59 yards, 5:26.**

**Top passers**

- BUF – Tyrod Taylor – 20/37, 166 yards, TD, INT
- CIN – Andy Dalton – 22/36, 328 yards, TD, 2 INT

**Top rushers**

- BUF – LeSean McCoy – 6 rushes, 26 yards
- CIN – Joe Mixon – 15 rushes, 51 yards, TD

**Top receivers**

- BUF – Nick O'Leary – 5 receptions, 54 yards
- CIN – A. J. Green – 7 receptions, 189 yards, TD

**Top tacklers**

- BUF – Shareece Wright – 8 tackles, 3 assists
- CIN – Vontaze Burfict – 10 tackles, 3 assists, sack

After a huge road win, the Bengals returned home for a game against the Bills. The Bengals would draw first blood in the first quarter when Andy Dalton found A. J. Green on a 77-yard pass to make it 7–0. The Bills scored a field goal later on in the quarter when Stephen Hauschka kicked a 31-yard field goal to make it 7-3. The Bengals moved up by a touchdown in the second quarter when Randy Bullock nailed a 30-yard field goal to make it 10–3. Though the Bills would tie it up later on in the quarter when Tyrod Taylor connected with Brandon Tate for a 12-yard pass making the score 10–10 at halftime. In the third quarter, the Bills moved into the lead with another field goal from Hauschka. This was from 38 yards out to make the score 13–10. In the fourth quarter, the Bengals retook the lead when Joe Mixon ran for a 5-yard touchdown making it 17–13. Hauschka got the Bills closer with a 28-yard field goal to make it 17–16. Though later on, Bullock kicked a 29-yard field goal making the score 20–16. This would be the eventual final score of the game.

With the win, the Bengals went into their bye week at 2–3.

==== Week 7: at Pittsburgh Steelers ====
Week Seven: Cincinnati Bengals at Pittsburgh Steelers – Game summary

Quarter	1	2	3	4	Total
Bengals	7	7	0	0	**14**
**Steelers**	7	13	6	3	**29**

at Heinz Field, Pittsburgh, Pennsylvania

- Date: October 22
- Game time: 4:25 pm. EDT
- Game weather: 79 °F (26 °C), sunny
- Game attendance: 65,363
- Referee: Bill Vinovich
- TV announcers (CBS): Jim Nantz, Tony Romo and Tracy Wolfson
- Recap, Gamebook

Game information

**First quarter**

- PIT – Antonio Brown 7-yard pass from Ben Roethlisberger (Chris Boswell kick), 9:25. Steelers 7–0. **Drive: 9 plays, 75 yards, 5:35.**
- CIN – Brandon LaFell 6-yard pass from Andy Dalton (Randy Bullock kick), 0:10. Tied 7–7. **Drive: 8 plays, 53 yards, 3:34.**

**Second quarter**

- PIT – JuJu Smith-Schuster 31-yard pass from Ben Roethlisberger (Chris Boswell kick), 12:52. Steelers 14–7. **Drive: 5 plays, 75 yards, 2:18.**
- CIN – Tyler Kroft 1-yard pass from Andy Dalton (Randy Bullock kick), 7:12. Tied 14–14. **Drive: 12 plays, 75 yards, 5:40.**
- PIT – Chris Boswell 22-yard field goal, 1:50. Steelers 17–14. **Drive: 10 plays, 75 yards, 5:22.**
- PIT – Chris Boswell 24-yard field goal, 0:00. Steelers 20–14. **Drive: 7 plays, 71 yards, 1:28.**

**Third quarter**

- PIT – Chris Boswell 41-yard field goal, 7:23. Steelers 23–14. **Drive: 11 plays, 54 yards, 5:57.**
- PIT – Chris Boswell 49-yard field goal, 5:28. Steelers 26–14. **Drive: 4 plays, 9 yards, 1:20.**

**Fourth quarter**

- PIT – Chris Boswell 25-yard field goal, 5:14. Steelers 29–14. **Drive: 10 plays, 70 yards, 4:06.**

**Top passers**

- CIN – Andy Dalton – 17/30, 140 yards, 2 TD, 2 INT
- PIT – Ben Roethlisberger – 14/24, 224 yards, 2 TD

**Top rushers**

- CIN – Joe Mixon – 7 carries, 48 yards
- PIT – Le'Veon Bell – 35 carries, 134 yards

**Top receivers**

- CIN – Brandon LaFell – 4 receptions, 28 yards, TD
- PIT – Antonio Brown – 4 receptions, 65 yards, TD

**Top tacklers**

- CIN – Nick Vigil - 3 tackles, 5 assists
- PIT – Ryan Shazier - 5 tackles, 3 assists

Coming off their bye week, the Bengals traveled to Pittsburgh for Game 1 against the division rival Steelers. The Steelers would score first when Ben Roethlisberger found Antonio Brown on a 7-yard pass to make it 7–0. Though later on in the quarter, the Bengals would tie it up when Andy Dalton found Brandon LaFell on a 6-yard pass to make it a 7–7 game. In the second quarter, the Steelers moved back into the lead when Roethlisberger found JuJu Smith-Schuster on a 31-yard pass to make it 14–7. But the Bengals tied it up again when Dalton found Tyler Kroft on a 1-yard pass making it 14–14. The Steelers closed the half with 2 field goals kicked by Chris Boswell: From 22 and 24 yards out to retake the lead 17–14 and then make it 20–14 at halftime. In the highly defensive second half, the Steelers managed to score more field goals starting in the third quarter when Boswell went for 2 more: From 41 and 49 yards out to increase the Steelers' lead from 9 to 12 and making the score change from 23–14 to 26–14. In the last quarter, the Steelers would pretty much seal the game when Boswell hit his fifth field goal of the game from 29-yards out to make the final score 29–14.

With their fifth straight loss to the Steelers, the Bengals dropped to 2–4.

==== Week 8: vs. Indianapolis Colts ====
Week Eight: Indianapolis Colts at Cincinnati Bengals – Game summary

Quarter	1	2	3	4	Total
Colts	0	13	7	3	**23**
**Bengals**	3	7	7	7	**24**

at Paul Brown Stadium, Cincinnati, Ohio

- Date: October 29
- Game time: 1:00 pm. EDT
- Game weather: 39 °F (4 °C), cloudy
- Game attendance: 57,901
- Referee: Jerome Boger
- TV announcers (CBS): Spero Dedes and Adam Archuleta
- Recap, Gamebook

Game information

**First quarter**

- CIN – Randy Bullock 29-yard field goal, 5:41. Bengals 3–0. **Drive: 9 plays, 38 yards, 3:59.**

**Second quarter**

- IND – Adam Vinatieri 29-yard field goal, 12:02. Tied 3–3. **Drive: 7 plays, 16 yards, 2:40.**
- IND – Jack Doyle 13-yard pass from Jacoby Brissett (Adam Vinatieri kick), 8:14. Colts 10–3. **Drive: 7 plays, 48 yards, 3:23.**
- CIN – A. J. Green 8-yard pass from Andy Dalton (Randy Bullock kick), 4:36. Tied 10–10. **Drive: 7 plays, 91 yards, 3:38.**
- IND – Adam Vinatieri 33-yard field goal, 0:00. Colts 13–10. **Drive: 7 plays, 65 yards, 1:13.**

**Third quarter**

- CIN – Josh Malone 25-yard pass from Andy Dalton (Randy Bullock kick), 9:10. Bengals 17–13. **Drive: 11 plays, 77 yards, 5:50.**
- IND – Marlon Mack 24-yard pass from Jacoby Brissett (Adam Vinatieri kick), 2:10. Colts 20–17. **Drive: 13 plays, 88 yards, 7:00.**

**Fourth quarter**

- IND – Adam Vinatieri 29-yard field goal, 11:21. Colts 23–17. **Drive: 9 plays, 26 yards, 4:39.**
- CIN – Carlos Dunlap 16-yard interception return (Randy Bullock kick), 6:58. Bengals 24–23.

**Top passers**

- IND – Jacoby Brissett – 25/39, 233 yards, 2 TD, INT
- CIN – Andy Dalton – 17/29, 243 yards, 2 TD

**Top rushers**

- IND – Frank Gore – 16 carries, 82 yards
- CIN – Joe Mixon – 11 carries, 18 yards

**Top receivers**

- IND – Jack Doyle – 12 receptions, 121 yards, TD
- CIN – Tyler Kroft – 5 receptions, 46 yards

**Top tacklers**

- IND – Jon Bostic - 4 tackles, 4 assists, 1 sack
- CIN – Darqueze Dennard - 7 tackles, 3 assists

After a tough loss, the Bengals returned home for a game against the Colts. The Bengals jumped out to an early lead in the first quarter when Randy Bullock kicked a 29-yard field goal to make it 3–0. This would be the only score of the quarter. In the second quarter the Colts scored 10 unanswered points and took the lead when at first they would tie it up with Adam Vinatieri's 29-yard field goal to make it 3–3 followed up by Jacoby Brissett finding Jack Doyle on a 13-yard pass to make it 10–3. The Bengals tied it up later on in the quarter when Andy Dalton found A. J. Green on an 8-yard pass to make it 10–10. But the Colts would move ahead at halftime with Vinatieri finishing up with a 33-yard field goal to make it 13–10. In the third quarter, the Bengals retook the lead 17–13 when Dalton found Josh Malone on a 25-yard pass. Though the Colts took the lead back afterwards when Brissett found Marlon Mack on a 24-yard pass making it 20–17. In the fourth quarter, the Colts increased their lead when Vinatieri kicked yet another 29-yard field goal to make it 23–17. Though the Bengals would eventually seal the victory when Brissett was intercepted by Carlos Dunlap and it was returned for a 16-yard touchdown to make the final score 24–23.

With the win, the Bengals improved to 3–4.

==== Week 9: at Jacksonville Jaguars ====
Week Nine: Cincinnati Bengals at Jacksonville Jaguars – Game summary

Quarter	1	2	3	4	Total
Bengals	0	7	0	0	**7**
**Jaguars**	3	10	3	7	**23**

at EverBank Field, Jacksonville, Florida

- Date: November 5
- Game time: 1:00 pm. EST
- Game weather: 78 °F (26 °C)
- Game attendance: 60,720
- Referee: Brad Allen
- TV announcers (CBS): Andrew Catalon and James Lofton
- Recap, Gamebook

Game information

**First quarter**

- JAX – Josh Lambo 32-yard field goal, 2:34. Jaguars 3–0. **Drive: 9 plays, 71 yards, 4:01.**

**Second quarter**

- JAX – Marqise Lee 3-yard pass from Blake Bortles (Josh Lambo kick), 7:01. Jaguars 10–0. **Drive: 15 plays, 96 yards, 7:55.**
- CIN – Joe Mixon 7-yard run (Marshall Koehn kick), 4:18. Jaguars 10–7. **Drive: 5 plays, 80 yards, 2:44.**
- JAX – Josh Lambo 56-yard field goal, 0:28. Jaguars 13–7. **Drive: 11 plays, 37 yards, 3:50.**

**Third quarter**

- JAX – Josh Lambo 25-yard field goal, 6:55. Jaguars 16–7. **Drive: 9 plays, 79 yards, 4:39.**

**Fourth quarter**

- JAX – Jaydon Mickens 63-yard punt return (Josh Lambo kick), 14:54. Jaguars 23–7.

**Top passers**

- CIN – Andy Dalton – 10/18, 136 yards
- JAX – Blake Bortles – 24/38, 259 yards, TD

**Top rushers**

- CIN – Joe Mixon – 13 rushes, 31 yards, TD
- JAX – Chris Ivory – 20 rushes, 69 yards

**Top receivers**

- CIN – Tyler Kroft – 2 receptions, 79 yards
- JAX – Marqise Lee – 8 receptions, 75 yards, TD

**Top tacklers**

- CIN – George Iloka – 7 tackles
- JAX – Barry Church – 3 tackles, 2 assists

After winning at home, the Bengals traveled down south to take on the Jaguars. The Jags scored first in the first quarter when Josh Lambo kicked a 32-yard field goal to make it 3–0. They would make it 10–0 in the second quarter when Blake Bortles found Marqise Lee on a 3-yard pass. The Bengals got on the board coming within 3 as Joe Mixon ran for a 7-yard touchdown making the score 10–7. However, the Jags pulled away with Lambo's 56-yard field goal to make it 13–7 at halftime. In the second half it was all Jags as they scored in the third quarter with Lambo hitting his third field goal of the day from 25 yards out to make it 16–7. In the fourth quarter, they would wrap up the scoring of the game with Jaydon Mickens 63-yard punt return for a touchdown and the final score 23–7.

With the loss, the Bengals fell to 3–5.

The game was notable seeing A. J. Green getting ejected in the second quarter after fighting with Jacksonville's Jalen Ramsey, who was also ejected.

==== Week 10: at Tennessee Titans ====
Week Ten: Cincinnati Bengals at Tennessee Titans – Game summary

Quarter	1	2	3	4	Total
Bengals	6	7	0	7	**20**
**Titans**	7	10	0	7	**24**

at Nissan Stadium, Nashville, Tennessee

- Date: November 12
- Game time: 1:00 pm. EST/12:00 pm. CST
- Game weather: 53 °F (12 °C), cloudy
- Game attendance: 67,432
- Referee: Jeff Triplette
- TV announcers (Fox): Dick Stockton, Mark Schlereth and Shannon Spake
- Recap, Gamebook

Game information

**First quarter**

- TEN – DeMarco Murray 2–yard run (Ryan Succop kick), 7:56. Titans 7–0. **Drive: 10 plays, 84 yards, 5:25.**
- CIN – Brandon LaFell 37–yard pass from Andy Dalton (kick failed, wide left), 4:44. Titans 7–6. **Drive: 8 plays, 75 yards, 3:12.**

**Second quarter**

- TEN – DeMarco Murray 1–yard run (Ryan Succop kick), 5:08. Titans 14–6. **Drive: 5 plays, 27 yards, 1:31.**
- CIN – Joe Mixon 3–yard run (Randy Bullock kick), 1:42. Titans 14–13. **Drive: 1 play, 3 yards, 0:04.**
- TEN – Ryan Succop 44–yard field goal, 0:00. Titans 17–13. **Drive: 10 plays, 53 yards, 1:42.**

**Third quarter**

- No scoring plays

**Fourth quarter**

- CIN – A. J. Green 70–yard pass from Andy Dalton (Randy Bullock kick), 5:03. Bengals 20–17. **Drive: 2 plays, 82 yards, 0:41.**
- TEN – DeMarco Murray 7–yard pass from Marcus Mariota (Ryan Succop kick), 0:36. Titans 24–20. **Drive: 12 plays, 73 yards, 4:27.**

**Top passers**

- CIN – Andy Dalton – 20/35, 265 yards, 2 TD
- TEN – Marcus Mariota – 25/44, 264 yards, TD, INT

**Top rushers**

- CIN – Joe Mixon – 9 rushes, 37 yards, TD
- TEN – DeMarco Murray – 14 rushes, 42 yards, 2 TD

**Top receivers**

- CIN – A. J. Green – 5 receptions, 115 yards, TD
- TEN – Delanie Walker – 6 receptions, 63 yards

After a tough loss, the Bengals traveled further north to take on the Titans. The Titans drew first blood in the first quarter when DeMarco Murray ran for a 2-yard touchdown to make it 7–0. The Bengals then got on the board when Andy Dalton found Brandon LaFell on a 37-yard pass (with a failed PAT) to make it 7–6. The Titans managed to pull away in the second quarter when Murray ran for a 2-yard touchdown to make it 14–6. The Bengals came within 1 again when Joe Mixon ran for a 3-yard touchdown to make it 14–13. The Titans then closed out the half with Ryan Succop's 44-yard field goal to make it 17–13 at halftime. After a scoreless third quarter, the Bengals took the lead in the fourth quarter when Dalton found A. J. Green on a 70-yard pass to make it 20–17. Though the Titans were able to complete the comeback when Murray ran for his third touchdown of the day: From 7 yards out to make it 24–20 sealing the win.

With the loss, the Bengals fell to 3–6.

==== Week 11: at Denver Broncos ====
Week Eleven: Cincinnati Bengals at Denver Broncos – Game summary

Quarter	1	2	3	4	Total
**Bengals**	6	7	0	7	**20**
Broncos	7	0	3	7	**17**

at Sports Authority Field at Mile High, Denver, Colorado

- Date: November 19
- Game time: 4:25 pm. EST/2:25 p.m. MST
- Game weather: 60 °F (16 °C), mostly cloudy
- Game attendance: 75,707
- Referee: Craig Wrolstad
- TV announcers (CBS): Greg Gumbel, Trent Green and Jamie Erdahl
- Recap, Gamebook

Game information

**First quarter**

- CIN – Tyler Kroft 1-yard pass from Andy Dalton (kick failed, wide left), 7:11. Bengals 6–0. **Drive: 3 plays, 1 yard, 1:17.**
- DEN – C. J. Anderson 3-yard tun (Brandon McManus kick), 0:45. Broncos 7–6. **Drive: 14 plays, 75 yards, 6:25.**

**Second quarter**

- CIN – Alex Erickson 29-yard pass from Andy Dalton (Randy Bullock kick), 13:01. Bengals 13–7. **Drive: 7 plays, 75 yards, 2:46.**

**Third quarter**

- DEN – Brandon McManus 45-yard field goal, 4:58. Bengals 13–10. **Drive: 7 plays, 17 yards, 2:14.**

**Fourth quarter**

- CIN – A. J. Green 18-yard pass from Andy Dalton (Randy Bullock kick), 9:02. Bengals 20–10. **Drive: 6 plays, 44 yards, 3:17.**
- DEN – Demaryius Thomas 17-yard pass from Brock Osweiler, 5:12. Bengals 20–17. **Drive: 10 plays, 75 yards, 3:51.**

**Top passers**

- CIN – Andy Dalton – 15/25, 154 yards, 3 TD
- DEN – Brock Osweiler – 23/42, TD, INT

**Top rushers**

- CIN – Joe Mixon – 20 rushes, 49 yards
- DEN – Devontae Booker – 14 rushes, 44 yards

**Top receivers**

- CIN – A. J. Green – 4 receptions, 50 yards, TD
- DEN – Demaryius Thomas – 5 receptions, 64 yards, TD

**Top tacklers**

- CIN – Vontaze Burfict - 10 tackles, 2 assists, .5 sacks
- DEN – Domata Peko - 5 tackles, 1 assist

After a tough road loss, the Bengals traveled west to take on the Broncos. In the first quarter, they would score first when Andy Dalton found Tyler Kroft on a 1-yard pass (with a failed PAT) to make it 6–0. The Broncos then took the lead when C.J. Anderson ran for a 3-yard touchdown to make it 7–6. In the second quarter, the Bengals moved back into the lead when Dalton found Alex Erickson on a 29-yard pass to make it 13–7 at halftime. In the third quarter, the Broncos came within 3 when Brandon McManus kicked a 45-yard field goal to make it 13–10. Though in the fourth quarter, the Bengals moved up by double digits when Dalton found A. J. Green on an 18-yard pass to make it 20–10. The Broncos then concluded the scoring of the game when Brock Osweiler found Demaryius Thomas on a 17-yard pass to make the final score 20–17.

With the win, the Bengals improved to 4–6. The team also won against the Broncos in Denver for the first time since 1975.

==== Week 12: vs. Cleveland Browns ====
Week Twelve: Cleveland Browns at Cincinnati Bengals – Game summary

Quarter	1	2	3	4	Total
Browns	3	3	3	7	**16**
**Bengals**	7	9	7	7	**30**

at Paul Brown Stadium, Cincinnati, Ohio

- Date: November 26
- Game time: 1:00 pm. EST
- Game weather: 46 °F (8 °C), partly cloudy
- Game attendance: 51,710
- Referee: John Hussey
- TV announcers (CBS): Andrew Catalon and James Lofton
- Recap, Gamebook

Game information

**First quarter**

- CLE – Zane Gonzalez 27-yard field goal, 9:21. Browns 3–0. **Drive: 11 plays, 66 yards, 5:43.**
- CIN – Tyler Boyd 8-yard pass from Andy Dalton (Randy Bullock kick), 5:12. Bengals 7–3. **Drive: 9 plays, 75 yards, 4:09.**

**Second quarter**

- CIN – Randy Bullock 31-yard field goal, 9:17. Bengals 10–3. **Drive: 12 plays, 54 yards, 5:55.**
- CIN – Randy Bullock 49-yard field goal, 6:17. Bengals 13–3. **Drive: 5 plays, 18 yards, 1:19.**
- CIN – Randy Bullock 21-yard field goal, 2:10. Bengals 16–3. **Drive: 6 plays, 42 yards, 3:09.**
- CLE – Zane Gonzalez 21-yard field goal, 0:05. Bengals 16–6. **Drive: 11 plays, 75 yards, 2:06.**

**Third quarter**

- CIN – Tyler Kroft 1-yard pass from Andy Dalton (Randy Bullock kick), 10:26. Bengals 23–6. **Drive: 10 plays, 78 yards, 4:39.**
- CLE – Zane Gonzalez 39-yard field goal, 4:37. Bengals 23–9. **Drive: 10 plays, 59 yards, 5:48.**

**Fourth quarter**

- CLE – DeShone Kizer 3-yard run (Zane Gonzalez kick), 7:01. Bengals 23–16. **Drive: 15 plays, 89 yards, 5:29.**
- CIN – Joe Mixon 11-yard run (Randy Bullock kick), 3:02. Bengals 30–16. **Drive: 7 plays, 75 yards, 4:00.**

**Top passers**

- CLE – DeShone Kizer – 18/31, 268 yards
- CIN – Andy Dalton – 18/28, 214 yards, 2 TD

**Top rushers**

- CLE – Isaiah Crowell – 16 rushes, 95 yards
- CIN – Joe Mixon – 23 rushes, 114 yards, TD

**Top receivers**

- CLE – Corey Coleman – 3 receptions, 64 yards
- CIN – A. J. Green – 5 receptions, 66 yards

**Top tacklers**

- CLE – Joe Schobert - 10 tackles, 3 assists
- CIN – Dre Kirkpatrick - 7 tackles, 2 assists

After winning on the road, the Bengals returned home for Game 2 of the Battle of Ohio. In the first quarter, the Browns took an early lead when Zane Gonzalez kicked a 27-yard field goal to make it 3–0. Though the Bengals took the lead when Andy Dalton found Tyler Boyd on an 8-yard pass to make it 7–3. In the second quarter, the Bengals increased their lead with 3 straight field goals kicked by Randy Bullock: From 31, 49, and 21 yards out to make the score 10–3, 13–3, and 16–3. Gonzalez managed to get the Browns closer with a 21-yard field goal of his own to make it 16–6 at halftime. In the third quarter, the Bengals pulled away as Dalton found Tyler Kroft on a 1-yard pass to make it 23–6. Gonzalez managed to put to get the Browns within 2 touchdowns when he kicked his third field goal of the game: from 39 yards out to make it 23–9. The Browns came within a touchdown when DeShone Kizer ran for a 3-yard touchdown to make it 23–16. However, the Bengals sealed the game when Joe Mixon ran for an 11-yard touchdown to make the final score 30–16.

Against the Browns, Joe Mixon had a career day, rushing for 114 yards and a touchdown, the first 100-yard game of his young career. With the win and 7th straight over the Browns, the Bengals improved to 5–6, and swept the Browns for the second straight year.

==== Week 13: vs. Pittsburgh Steelers ====
Week Thirteen: Pittsburgh Steelers at Cincinnati Bengals – Game summary

Quarter	1	2	3	4	Total
**Steelers**	0	3	7	13	**23**
Bengals	10	7	3	0	**20**

at Paul Brown Stadium, Cincinnati, Ohio

- Date: December 4
- Game time: 8:30 pm. EST
- Game weather: 61 °F (16 °C), cloudy, chance of rain
- Game attendance: 56,029
- Referee: Walt Anderson
- TV announcers (ESPN): Sean McDonough, Jon Gruden and Lisa Salters
- Recap, Gamebook

Game information

**First quarter**

- CIN – Randy Bullock 35-yard field goal, 10:53. Bengals 3–0. **Drive: 5 plays, 27 yards, 2:04.**
- CIN – A. J. Green 8-yard pass from Andy Dalton (Randy Bullock kick), 0:45. Bengals 10–0. **Drive: 12 plays, 85 yards, 6:34.**

**Second quarter**

- CIN – A. J. Green 15-yard pass from Andy Dalton (Randy Bullock kick), 0:35. Bengals 17–0. **Drive: 15 plays, 78 yards, 6:13.**
- PIT – Chris Boswell 30-yard field goal, 0:05. Bengals 17–3. **Drive: 3 plays, 71 yards, 0:31.**

**Third quarter**

- PIT – Le'Veon Bell 35-yard pass from Ben Roethlisberger (Chris Boswell kick), 9:09. Bengals 17–10. **Drive: 9 plays, 78 yards, 4:58.**
- CIN – Randy Bullock 41-yard field goal, 3:38. Bengals 20–10. **Drive: 10 plays, 52 yards, 5:25.**

**Fourth quarter**

- PIT – Chris Boswell 37-yard field goal, 10:11. Bengals 20–13. **Drive: 11 plays, 74 yards, 4:29.**
- PIT – Antonio Brown 6-yard pass from Ben Roethlisberger (Chris Boswell kick), 3:55. Tied 20–20. **Drive: 9 plays, 80 yards, 4:10.**
- PIT – Chris Boswell 38-yard field goal, 0:04. Steelers 23–20. **Drive: 8 plays, 39 yards, 2:42.**

**Top passers**

- PIT – Ben Roethlisberger – 24/40, 290 yards, 2 TD, INT
- CIN – Andy Dalton – 21/36, 234 yards, 2 TD

**Top rushers**

- PIT – Le'Veon Bell – 18 rushes, 76 yards
- CIN – Giovani Bernard – 13 rushes, 77 yards

**Top receivers**

- PIT – Le'Veon Bell – 5 receptions, 106 yards, TD
- CIN – A. J. Green – 7 receptions, 77 yards, 2 TD

**Top tacklers**

- PIT – Vince Williams - 4 tackles, 5 assists, 1 sack
- CIN – Dre Kirkpatrick - 7 tackles

After winning on the road, the Bengals returned home for Game 2 against the Steelers. The Bengals scored first in the first quarter when Randy Bullock kicked a 35-yard field goal to make it 3–0. They would make it 10–0 later on in the quarter when Andy Dalton found A. J. Green on an 8-yard pass. In the second quarter, the Bengals scored again when Dalton found Green again on a 15-yard pass to make it 17–0. The Steelers got their only points of the first half when Chris Boswell kicked a 30-yard field goal to make it 17–3 at halftime. In the third quarter, the Steelers were able to come within a touchdown when Ben Roethlisberger found Le'Veon Bell on a 35-yard pass to make it 17–10. However, the Bengals moved back ahead by double digits when Bullock kicked a 41-yard field goal to make it 20–10. In the fourth quarter, it was all Steelers when Boswell kicked a 37-yard field goal to make the score 20–13. This would be followed up by tying the game at 20–20 when Roethlisberger found Antonio Brown on a 6-yard pass. Finally, the Steelers were able to seal the victory with seconds left when Boswell kicked the game-winning 38-yard field goal to make the final score 23–20.

With their 6th straight loss to the Steelers, the Bengals fell to 5–7.

==== Week 14: vs. Chicago Bears ====
Week Fourteen: Chicago Bears at Cincinnati Bengals – Game summary

Quarter	1	2	3	4	Total
**Bears**	6	6	7	14	**33**
Bengals	7	0	0	0	**7**

at Paul Brown Stadium, Cincinnati, Ohio

- Date: December 10
- Game time: 1:00 pm. EST
- Game weather: 31 °F (−1 °C), partly cloudy
- Game attendance: 52,002
- Referee: John Parry
- TV announcers (Fox): Sam Rosen, Brady Quinn and Jenny Taft
- Recap, Gamebook

Game information

**First quarter**

- CHI – Jordan Howard 21-yard run (kick failed), 11:00. Bears 6–0. **Drive: 4 plays, 51 yards, 1:06.**
- CIN – Brandon LaFell 14-yard pass from Andy Dalton (Randy Bullock kick), 2:15. Bengals 7–6. **Drive: 7 plays, 72 yards, 3:59.**

**Second quarter**

- CHI – Mike Nugent 34-yard field goal, 12:38. Bears 9–7. **Drive: 10 plays, 73 yards, 4:37.**
- CHI – Mike Nugent 27-yard field goal, 1:46. Bears 12–7. **Drive: 15 plays, 86 yards, 8:11.**

**Third quarter**

- CHI – Mitchell Trubisky 4-yard run (Mike Nugent kick), 4:54. Bears 19–7. **Drive: 9 plays, 76 yards, 5:15.**

**Fourth quarter**

- CHI – Adam Shaheen 1-yard pass from Mitchell Trubisky (Mike Nugent kick), 14:52. Bears 26–7. **Drive: 7 plays, 43 yards, 3:23.**
- CHI – Jordan Howard 8-yard run (Mike Nugent kick), 9:18. Bears 33–7. **Drive: 7 plays, 80 yards, 4:13.**

**Top passers**

- CHI – Mitchell Trubisky – 25/32, 271 yards, TD
- CIN – Andy Dalton – 14/29, 141 yards, TD, INT

**Top rushers**

- CHI – Jordan Howard – 23 carries, 147 yards, 2 TD
- CIN – Giovani Bernard – 11 carries, 62 yards

**Top receivers**

- CHI – Kendall Wright – 10 receptions, 107 yards
- CIN – Giovani Bernard – 6 receptions, 68 yards

**Top tacklers**

- CHI – Danny Trevathan - 4 tackles, 6 assists
- CIN – Clayton Fejedelem - 5 tackles, 5 assists and Jordan Evans - 9 tackles, 1 assist

After a tough loss at home, the Bengals would remain at home for a game against the Bears. In the first quarter, the Bears took an early lead when Jordan Howard ran for a 21-yard touchdown (with a failed PAT) to make it 6–0. The Bengals however took the lead later on in the quarter when Andy Dalton found Brandon LaFell on a 14-yard pass to make it 7–6. The Bears retook the lead in the second quarter when Mike Nugent kicked 2 field goals: From 34 and 27 yards out to make it 9–7 and then 12–7 at halftime. The Bears then shut out the Bengals the entire second half while they score themselves: In the third quarter Mitchell Trubisky ran for a 4-yard touchdown to make it 19–7 for the only score of the third quarter. In the fourth quarter, they wrapped up the scoring when Trubisky found Adam Shaheen on a 1-yard pass to make it 26–7. Howard then ran for an 8-yard touchdown to make the final score 33–7.

With the loss, the Bengals dropped to 5–8. The team is also assured their second straight non-winning season.

==== Week 15: at Minnesota Vikings ====
Week Fifteen: Cincinnati Bengals at Minnesota Vikings – Game summary

Quarter	1	2	3	4	Total
Bengals	0	0	0	7	**7**
**Vikings**	17	7	3	7	**34**

at U.S. Bank Stadium, Minneapolis, Minnesota

- Date: December 17
- Game time: 1:00 pm. EST/12:00 pm. CST
- Game weather: Played indoors (dome stadium)
- Game attendance: 66,833
- Referee: Walt Coleman
- TV announcers (CBS): Ian Eagle, Dan Fouts and Evan Washburn
- Recap, Gamebook

Game information

First quarter

- MIN – Latavius Murray 1-yard run (Kai Forbath kick), 10:31. Vikings 7–0. **Drive: 9 plays, 75 yards, 4:29.**
- MIN – Eric Kendricks 31-yard interception return (Kai Forbath kick), 5:54. Vikings 14–0.
- MIN – Kai Forbath 53-yard field goal, 1:30. Vikings 17–0. **Drive: 4 plays, 3 yards, 2:10.**

Second quarter

- MIN – Stefon Diggs 20-yard pass from Case Keenum (Kai Forbath kick), 6:41. Vikings 24–0. **Drive: 8 plays, 77 yards, 4:24.**

Third quarter

- MIN – Kai Forbath 35-yard field goal, 6:34. Vikings 27–0. **Drive: 10 plays, 71 yards, 5:29.**

Fourth quarter

- MIN – Kyle Rudolph 1-yard pass from Case Keenum (Kai Forbath kick), 12:53. Vikings 34–0. **Drive: 7 plays, 83 yards, 3:38.**
- CIN – Giovani Bernard 2-yard run (Randy Bullock kick), 6:22. Vikings 34–7. **Drive: 6 plays, 23 yards, 2:56.**

Top passers

- CIN – Andy Dalton – 11/22, 113 yards
- MIN – Case Keenum – 20/23, 236 yards, 2 TD

Top rushers

- CIN – Giovani Bernard – 15 rushes, 37 yards, TD
- MIN – Latavius Murray – 20 rushes, 76 yards, TD

Top receivers

- CIN – Brandon LaFell – 8 receptions, 81 yards
- MIN – Jerick McKinnon – 7 receptions, 114 yards

The Bengals traveled to Minneapolis to take on the Vikings. The Vikes dominated the majority of the game starting in the first quarter when they scored 3 times: Latavius Murray ran for a 1-yard touchdown, Eric Kendricks intercepted Andy Dalton and returned it 31 yards for a touchdown, and then Kai Forbath kicked a 53-yard field goal to make it 17–0. They made it 24–0 in the second quarter before halftime when Case Keenum found Stefon Diggs on a 20-yard pass. In the third quarter, Forbath put a 35-yard field goal through to make it 27–0 for the only score. This would be followed up by Keenum finding Kyle Rudolph in the fourth quarter to make it 34–0. The Bengals score the last points of the game when Giovani Bernard ran for a 7-yard touchdown to make the final score 34–7.

With the loss, the Bengals dropped to 5–9. The team would have consecutive losing seasons for the first time since 2007 and 2008. Andy Dalton also tied his career-high for most games started and lost in a single season.

==== Week 16: vs. Detroit Lions ====
Week Sixteen: Detroit Lions at Cincinnati Bengals – Game summary

Quarter	1	2	3	4	Total
Lions	7	0	3	7	**17**
**Bengals**	0	6	7	13	**26**

at Paul Brown Stadium, Cincinnati, Ohio

- Date: December 24
- Game time: 1:00 pm. EST
- Game weather: 35 °F (2 °C), mostly cloudy
- Game attendance: 47,732
- Referee: Gene Steratore
- TV announcers (Fox): Thom Brennaman, Chris Spielman and Peter Schrager
- Recap, Gamebook

Game information

**First quarter**

- DET - Eric Ebron 33-yard pass from Matthew Stafford (Matt Prater kick). Lions 7–0. **Drive: 4 plays, 52 yards, 0:54.**

**Second quarter**

- CIN - Randy Bullock 29-yard field goal. Lions 7–3. **Drive: 12 plays, 68 yards, 4:48.**
- CIN - Randy Bullock 27-yard field goal. Lions 7–6. **Drive: 8 plays, 44 yards, 1:01.**

**Third quarter**

- DET - Matt Prater 23-yard field goal. Lions 10–6. **Drive: 11 plays, 61 yards, 5:34.**
- CIN - C. J. Uzomah 1-yard pass from Andy Dalton (Randy Bullock kick). Bengals 13–10. **Drive: 7 plays, 75 yards, 3:34.**

**Fourth quarter**

- CIN - Randy Bullock 35-yard field goal. Bengals 16–10. **Drive: 11 plays, 43 yards, 4:33.**
- DET - Tion Green 5-yard run (Matt Prater kick). Lions 17–16. **Drive: 10 plays, 75 yards, 4:24.**
- CIN - Randy Bullock 51-yard field goal. Bengals 19–17. **Drive: 11 plays, 53 yards, 5:07.**
- CIN - Giovani Bernard 12-yard run (Randy Bullock Kick). Bengals 26–17. **Drive: 6 plays, 40 yards, 1:48.**

**Top passers**

- DET – Matthew Stafford – 19/35, 203 yards, TD, INT
- CIN – Andy Dalton – 27/41, 238 yards, TD, INT

**Top rushers**

- DET – Tion Green – 7 carries, 43 yards, TD
- CIN – Giovani Bernard – 23 carries, 116 yards, TD

**Top receivers**

- DET – Eric Ebron – 5 receptions, 83 yards, TD
- CIN – A. J. Green – 6 receptions, 81 yards

**Top tacklers**

- DET – Glover Quin – 5 tackles, 4 assists
- CIN – Darqueze Dennard – 5 tackles, 2 assists

After yet another blowout loss, the Bengals returned home to take on the Lions. In the first quarter, the Lions scored when Matthew Stafford found Eric Ebron on a 33-yard pass to make it 7–0. The Bengals scored 2 field goals in the second quarter: Randy Bullock got them from 29 and 27 yards out to make the score 7–3 and then 7–6 at halftime. In the third quarter, Matt Prater put the Lions up by 4 with a 23-yard field goal to make it 10–6. The Bengals however took the lead later on when Andy Dalton found C.J. Uzomah on a 1-yard pass to make it 13–10. Bullock then put a 35-yard field goal through to make it 16–10. The Lions retook the lead when Tion Green ran for a 5-yard touchdown to make it 17–16. Though, the Bengals were able to score twice to seal the game: Bullock kicked a 51-yard field goal to make it 19–17. This would be followed by Giovani Bernard running for a 12-yard touchdown to make the final score 26–17.

With the win, the Bengals would improve to 6–9 and would knock the Detroit Lions out of the postseason.

==== Week 17: at Baltimore Ravens ====
Week Seventeen: Cincinnati Bengals at Baltimore Ravens – Game summary

Quarter	1	2	3	4	Total
**Bengals**	7	10	7	7	**31**
Ravens	0	10	7	10	**27**

at M&T Bank Stadium, Baltimore, Maryland

- Date: December 31
- Game time: 4:25 pm. EST
- Game weather: 19 °F (−7 °C), cloudy
- Game attendance: 70,507
- Referee: Ronald Torbert
- TV announcers (CBS): Ian Eagle, Dan Fouts and Evan Washburn
- Recap, Gamebook

Game information

**First quarter**

- CIN – Tyler Kroft 1-yard pass from Andy Dalton (Randy Bullock kick), 10:55. Bengals 7–0. **Drive: 8 plays, 78 yards, 4:05.**

**Second quarter**

- BAL – Justin Tucker 46-yard field goal, 11:18. Bengals 7–3. **Drive: 4 plays, 6 yards, 0:57.**
- CIN – Tyler Kroft 5-yard pass from Andy Dalton (Randy Bullock kick), 4:14. Bengals 14–3. **Drive: 9 plays, 72 yards, 3:58.**
- CIN – Randy Bullock 32-yard field goal, 0:26. Bengals 17–3. **Drive: 12 plays, 63 yards, 2:59.**
- BAL – Chris Moore 6-yard pass from Joe Flacco (Justin Tucker kick), 0:08. Bengals 17–10. **Drive: 1 play, 6 yards, 0:19.**

**Third quarter**

- CIN – Darqueze Dennard 89-yard interception return (Randy Bullock kick), 10:36. Bengals 24–10.
- BAL – Alex Collins 17-yard rush (Justin Tucker kick), 6:16. Bengals 24–17. **Drive: 8 plays, 61 yards, 4:01.**

**Fourth quarter**

- BAL – Justin Tucker 34-yard field goal, 13:12. Bengals 24–20. **Drive: 14 plays, 62 yards, 5:55.**
- BAL – Mike Wallace 6-yard pass from Joe Flacco (Justin Tucker kick), 8:48. Ravens 27–24. **Drive: 7 plays, 45 yards, 3:17.**
- CIN – Tyler Boyd 49-yard pass from Andy Dalton (Randy Bullock kick), 0:44. Bengals 31–27. **Drive: 11 plays, 90 yards, 1:59.**

**Top passers**

- CIN – Andy Dalton - 23/44, 222 yards, 3 TD
- BAL – Joe Flacco - 25/47, 203 yards, 2 TD, INT

**Top rushers**

- CIN – Joe Mixon - 18 carries, 96 yards
- BAL – Alex Collins - 20 carries, 78 yards, TD

**Top receivers**

- CIN – Tyler Boyd - 5 receptions, 91 yards, TD
- BAL – Benjamin Watson - 7 receptions, 61 yards

**Top tacklers**

- CIN – Vincent Rey - 8 tackles, 2 assists
- BAL – Maurice Canady - 7 tackles, 1 assist

The Bengals then closed out the regular season with Game 2 against the Ravens. In the first quarter, the Bengals scored when Andy Dalton found Tyler Kroft on a 1-yard pass to make it 7–0 for the only score. The Ravens got on the board in the second quarter when Justin Tucker nailed a 46-yard field goal to make it 7–3. However, Dalton and Kroft connected again on a 5-yard pass to make it 14–3. This would be followed up by Randy Bullock kicking a 32-yard field goal to make it 17–3 in favor of the Bengals. The Ravens then closed out the half when Joe Flacco found Chris Moore on a 6-yard pass to make the halftime score 17–10. In the third quarter, the Bengals moved back ahead by double digits when Darqueze Dennard returned an interception 89 yards for a touchdown to make it 24–10. Though, the Ravens reduced that lead again when Alex Collins ran for a 17-yard touchdown to make it 24–17. In the fourth quarter, the Ravens managed to take the lead when Tucker kicked a 34-yard field goal to make it 24–20 followed up by Flacco connecting with Mike Wallace on a 6-yard pass to make it 27–24. Though, the Bengals were able to complete the comeback when Dalton found Tyler Boyd on a 49-yard pass to make the final score 31–27.

The Bengals spoiled their division rival's playoff hopes thanks to a late Andy Dalton touchdown pass to Tyler Boyd. Due to the tiebreakers, and after a 4th down pass from Flacco to Wallace fell a few yards short of converting to a first down, the win also allowed the Buffalo Bills to end their 17-year postseason drought, as they would qualify for the playoffs for the first time since 1999.

Thanks to the Bengals' victory, thousands of grateful Bills fans donated money to Dalton's personal charity. Most of the donations were in $17 increments in honor of the Bills breaking their 17-year playoff drought. Over 11,000 people donated a combined over $250,000 to the Andy & Jordan Dalton Foundation, while Tyler Boyd's charity of choice, the Western Pennsylvania Youth Athletic Association, received $50,000 in donations from Bills fans. Relatedly, the Bills organization announced that they were sending Buffalo wings from Duff's Famous Wings to the Bengals organization, where they were consumed by residents of The Children's Home of Cincinnati.

The team finished 7–9.

=== Standings ===
==== Division ====
AFC North
	W	L	T	PCT	DIV	CONF	PF	PA	STK
^{(2)} Pittsburgh Steelers	13	3	0	.813	6–0	10–2	406	308	W2
Baltimore Ravens	9	7	0	.563	3–3	7–5	395	303	L1
Cincinnati Bengals	7	9	0	.438	3–3	6–6	290	349	W2
Cleveland Browns	0	16	0	.000	0–6	0–12	234	410	L16

==== Conference ====
AFC
#	Team	Division	W	L	T	PCT	DIV	CONF	SOS	SOV	STK
**Division leaders**
1 (Note: New England claimed the No. 1 seed over Pittsburgh based on head-to-head victory.)	New England Patriots	East	13	3	0	.813	5–1	10–2	.484	.466	W3
2	Pittsburgh Steelers	North	13	3	0	.813	6–0	10–2	.453	.423	W2
3 (Note: Jacksonville claimed the No. 3 seed over Kansas City based on conference record.)	Jacksonville Jaguars	South	10	6	0	.625	4–2	9–3	.434	.394	L2
4	Kansas City Chiefs	West	10	6	0	.625	5–1	8–4	.477	.481	W4
**Wild Cards**
5 (Note: Tennessee finished ahead of Buffalo, Baltimore and Los Angeles Chargers based on conference record, claiming the No. 5 seed. Buffalo and Baltimore finished ahead of Los Angeles Chargers based on conference record. Buffalo claimed the No. 6 seed over Baltimore based on strength of victory.)	Tennessee Titans	South	9	7	0	.563	5–1	8–4	.434	.396	W1
6	Buffalo Bills	East	9	7	0	.563	3–3	7–5	.492	.396	W1
**Did not qualify for the postseason**
7	Baltimore Ravens	North	9	7	0	.563	3–3	7–5	.441	.299	L1
8	Los Angeles Chargers	West	9	7	0	.563	3–3	6–6	.457	.347	W2
9	Cincinnati Bengals	North	7	9	0	.438	3–3	6–6	.465	.321	W2
10 (Note: Oakland finished ahead of Miami based on head-to-head victory.)	Oakland Raiders	West	6	10	0	.375	2–4	5–7	.512	.396	L4
11	Miami Dolphins	East	6	10	0	.375	2–4	5–7	.543	.531	L3
12 (Note: Denver finished ahead of the New York Jets based on head-to-head victory.)	Denver Broncos	West	5	11	0	.313	2–4	4–8	.492	.413	L2
13	New York Jets	East	5	11	0	.313	2–4	5–7	.520	.438	L4
14 (Note: Indianapolis finished ahead of Houston based on head-to-head sweep.)	Indianapolis Colts	South	4	12	0	.250	2–4	3–9	.480	.219	W1
15	Houston Texans	South	4	12	0	.250	1–5	3–9	.516	.375	L6
16	Cleveland Browns	North	0	16	0	.000	0–6	0–12	.520	–	L16
**Tiebreakers** (Note: When breaking ties for three or more teams under the NFL's rules, they are first broken within divisions, then comparing only the highest ranked remaining team from each division.)
