= 2016 Cincinnati Bengals season =

NFL team season

- Owner: Mike Brown
- Head coach: Marvin Lewis
- Home stadium: Paul Brown Stadium

Results
- Record: 6–9–1
- Division place: 3rd AFC North
- Playoffs: Did not qualify
- Pro Bowlers: DT Geno Atkins; QB Andy Dalton; DE Carlos Dunlap; WR A. J. Green; OT Andrew Whitworth

Uniform
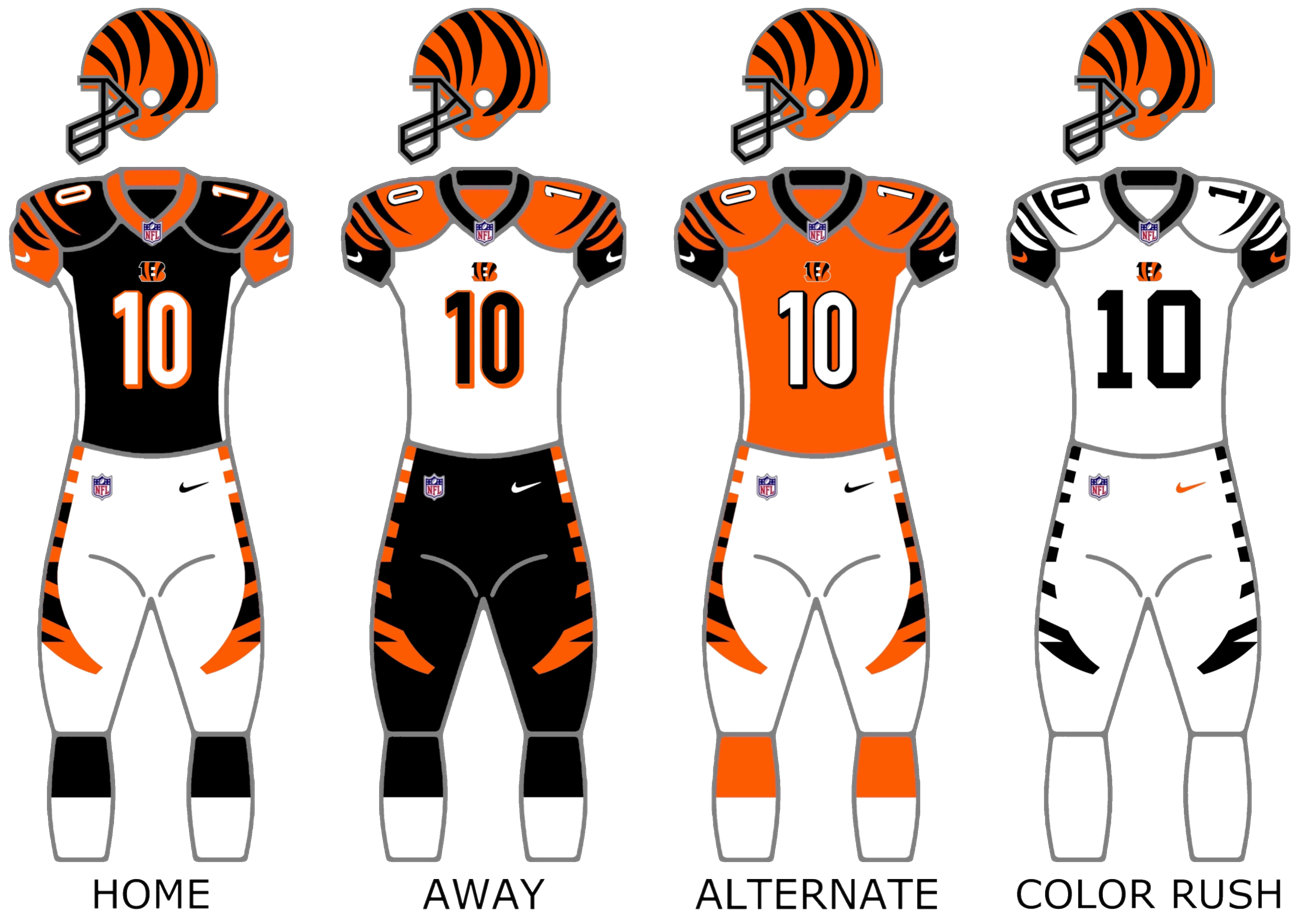

The 2016 season was the Cincinnati Bengals' 47th in the National Football League (NFL), their 49th overall and their 14th under head coach Marvin Lewis. The Bengals regressed from their 12–4 record from 2015, and missed the playoffs for the first time since 2010, finishing 6–9–1, and finishing in 3rd place in their division. This season would see the Bengals play in London for the first time ever, where they tied the Washington Redskins 27–27.

== Offseason ==
=== Organizational changes ===
On January 12, 2016, defensive backs coach Vance Joseph was hired as the new defensive coordinator of the Miami Dolphins. On the same day, linebackers coach Matt Burke also was hired as the new linebackers coach of the Miami Dolphins. On January 13, offensive coordinator Hue Jackson was hired as the new head coach of the Cleveland Browns. On January 15, quarterbacks coach Ken Zampese was promoted to offensive coordinator. On the same day, former New Orleans Saints head coach Jim Haslett was hired as the new linebackers coach. On January 18, the Bengals hired former Miami Dolphins assistant coaches Bill Lazor as the new quarterbacks coach, and Kevin Coyle as the new defensive backs coach, as well as hiring Washington Redskins assistant coach Jacob Burney as the new defensive line coach. On January 19, defensive line coach Jay Hayes was hired to be the new defensive line coach of the Tampa Bay Buccaneers.

=== Contract extensions ===
On March 4, the Bengals signed wide receiver Brandon Tate to a one-year extension through 2017 worth $1,024,000. On March 7, the Bengals signed center T. J. Johnson to a one-year extension through 2017 worth $600,000. On May 17, the Bengals signed safety Shawn Williams to a four-year extension through 2020 worth $19.5 million. On June 8, the Bengals signed halfback Giovani Benard to a three-year extension through 2019 worth $15.5 million. On August 2, the Bengals signed tight end Ryan Hewitt to a three-year extension through 2019 worth $7.5 million.

=== Roster changes ===
==== Acquisitions ====
===== Pre-Draft =====
The first transactions of the year occurred shortly after the conclusion of the 2015 regular season on January 8, when the Bengals signed kicker Zach Hocker, defensive end Dezmond Johnson and safety Floyd Raven to Reserve/Future contracts. On January 11, the Bengals signed wide receiver Michael Bennett and Jake Kumerow, offensive lineman Trey Hopkins, linebacker Jeff Luc and Jayson DiManche, and tight end Matt Lengel to reserve/future contracts. Additionally, the Bengals signed running back Bronson Hill to a reserve/future contract on February 2, and tight end John Peters on February 3. On February 8, the Bengals signed Baltimore Ravens offensive lineman Darryl Baldwin and New York Giants cornerback Chykie Brown.

On March 17, the Bengals signed Oakland Raiders safety Taylor Mays. On March 29, 2016, they signed Cleveland Browns linebacker Karlos Dansby. On March 30, the Bengals signed New England Patriots wide receiver Brandon LaFell.

===== Post-Draft =====
On May 8, the Bengals signed four undrafted free agents: kicker Jonathan Brown (Louisville), linebacker Gionni Paul (Utah), offensive lineman Trip Thurman (Florida), and cornerback Corey Tindal (Marshall). On May 11, the Bengals signed former Louisville offensive lineman Aaron Epps (UDFA). On May 16, the Bengals signed former Buffalo quarterback Joe Licata (UDFA). On May 26, the Bengals signed fullback Andrew Bonnet. On July 26, the Bengals signed former Calgary wide receiver Rashaun Simonise (UDFA). On July 27, the Bengals signed former Nebraska defensive end Jack Gangwish (UDFA). On July 28, the Bengals signed safety Jimmy Wilson.

==== Departures ====
Of the Bengals' unrestricted free agents, wide receiver Mohamed Sanu signed a 5-year $40 million contract with the Atlanta Falcons on March 11. On the same day, wide receiver Marvin Jones signed a 5-year $40 million contract with the Detroit Lions. On April 6, safety Reggie Nelson signed a 2-year $12 million contract with the Oakland Raiders. On August 4, cornerback Leon Hall signed a one-year $2 million deal with the New York Giants.

On April 26, the Bengals released linebacker A.J. Hawk. On May 11, offensive lineman Darryl Baldwin was released. On May 16, undrafted free agent quarterback Matt Johnson was released. On July 20, undrafted free agent cornerback Corey Tindal was released. On July 26, defensive end Dezmond Johnson and undrafted free agent running back DyShawn Mobley were released.

=== 2016 NFL draft ===
==== Pre-draft ====
Prior to the draft, the Bengals held visits for 40 players; 15 had private visits, 5 players visited during the NFL Scouting Combine, 1 met during the Senior Bowl, and 2 at the East–West Shrine Game, 11 had private workouts, while 2 had local visits.

==== Draft ====
2016 Cincinnati Bengals Draft
Round	Selection	Player	Position	College
1	24	William Jackson III	CB	Houston
2	55	Tyler Boyd	WR	Pittsburgh
3	87	Nick Vigil	MLB	Utah State
4	122	Andrew Billings	DT	Baylor
5	161	Christian Westerman	G	Arizona State
6	199	Cody Core	WR	Ole Miss
7	245	Clayton Fejedelem	S	Illinois

==== Undrafted free agents ====
After the draft, the Bengals signed the following undrafted free agents.

Position	Player	College
DE	Ryan Brown	Mississippi State
RB	Tra Carson	Texas A&M
RB	Dy'shawn Mobley	Eastern Kentucky
G-C	Alex Cooper	Houston
G-C	Alex Redmond	UCLA
DT	David Dean	Virginia
WR	Alex Erickson	Wisconsin
WR	Antwane Grant	Western Kentucky
WR	Alonzo Russell	Toledo
LB	Darien Harris	Michigan State
CB	Darius Hillary	Wisconsin
QB	Matt Johnson	Bowling Green
T	John Weidenaar	Montana State
QB	Joe Licata	Buffalo

== Schedule ==
=== Preseason ===
Week	Date	Opponent	Result	Record	Venue	Recap
1	August 12	Minnesota Vikings	**L** 16–17	0–1	Paul Brown Stadium	Recap
2	August 18	at Detroit Lions	**W** 30–14	1–1	Ford Field	Recap
3	August 28	at Jacksonville Jaguars	**L** 21–26	1–2	EverBank Field	Recap
4	September 1	Indianapolis Colts	**L** 10–13	1–3	Paul Brown Stadium	Recap

=== Regular season ===
Week	Date	Opponent	Result	Record	Venue	Recap
1	September 11	at New York Jets	**W** 23–22	1–0	MetLife Stadium	Recap
2	September 18	at **Pittsburgh Steelers**	**L** 16–24	1–1	Heinz Field	Recap
3	September 25	Denver Broncos	**L** 17–29	1–2	Paul Brown Stadium	Recap
4	September 29	Miami Dolphins	**W** 22–7	2–2	Paul Brown Stadium	Recap
5	October 9	at Dallas Cowboys	**L** 14–28	2–3	AT&T Stadium	Recap
6	October 16	at New England Patriots	**L** 17–35	2–4	Gillette Stadium	Recap
7	October 23	**Cleveland Browns**	**W** 31–17	3–4	Paul Brown Stadium	Recap
8	October 30	Washington Redskins	**T** 27–27 (OT)	3–4–1	(United Kingdom) Wembley Stadium (London)	Recap
9	Bye					
10	November 14	at New York Giants	**L** 20–21	3–5–1	MetLife Stadium	Recap
11	November 20	Buffalo Bills	**L** 12–16	3–6–1	Paul Brown Stadium	Recap
12	November 27	at **Baltimore Ravens**	**L** 14–19	3–7–1	M&T Bank Stadium	Recap
13	December 4	Philadelphia Eagles	**W** 32–14	4–7–1	Paul Brown Stadium	Recap
14	December 11	at **Cleveland Browns**	**W** 23–10	5–7–1	FirstEnergy Stadium	Recap
15	December 18	**Pittsburgh Steelers**	**L** 20–24	5–8–1	Paul Brown Stadium	Recap
16	December 24	at Houston Texans	**L** 10–12	5–9–1	NRG Stadium	Recap
17	January 1	**Baltimore Ravens**	**W** 27–10	6–9–1	Paul Brown Stadium	Recap

Note: Intra-division opponents are in bold text.

=== Game summaries ===
==== Week 1: at New York Jets ====
Week One: Cincinnati Bengals at New York Jets – Game summary

Quarter	1	2	3	4	Total
**Bengals**	3	10	7	3	**23**
Jets	7	9	0	6	**22**

at MetLife Stadium, East Rutherford, New Jersey

- Date: September 11
- Game time: 1:00 p.m. EDT
- Game weather: 79 °F (26 °C)
- Game attendance: 78,160
- Referee: Clete Blakeman
- TV announcers (CBS): Jim Nantz, Phil Simms and Tracy Wolfson
- Recap, Gamebook

Game information

**First quarter**

- NYJ – Quincy Enunwa 3-yard pass from Ryan Fitzpatrick (Nick Folk kick), 7:40. Jets 7–0. **Drive: 10 plays, 78 yards, 4:49.**
- CIN – Mike Nugent 33-yard field goal, 1:29. Jets 7–3. **Drive: 6 plays, 65 yards, 2:13.**

**Second quarter**

- CIN – A. J. Green 54-yard pass from Andy Dalton (Mike Nugent kick), 11:23. Bengals 10–7. **Drive: 4 plays, 78 yards, 2:11.**
- NYJ – Eric Decker 15-yard pass from Ryan Fitzpatrick (kick failed, wide right), 9:38. Jets 13–10. **Drive: 5 plays, 39 yards, 1:45.**
- NYJ – Nick Folk 45-yard field goal, 3:19. Jets 16–10. **Drive: 9 plays, 28 yards, 4:42.**
- CIN – Mike Nugent 21-yard field goal, 0:00. Jets 16–13. **Drive: 12 plays, 82 yards, 3:19.**

**Third quarter**

- CIN – Jeremy Hill 12-yard run (Mike Nugent kick), 3:09. Bengals 20–16. **Drive: 9 plays, 92 yards, 4:09.**

**Fourth quarter**

- NYJ – Nick Folk 20-yard field goal, 11:26. Bengals 20–19. **Drive: 12 plays, 73 yards, 6:43.**
- NYJ – Nick Folk 23-yard field goal, 3:23. Jets 22–20. **Drive: 9 plays, 52 yards, 5:39.**
- CIN – Mike Nugent 47-yard field goal, 0:54. Bengals 23–22. **Drive: 9 plays, 55 yards, 2:29.**

**Top passers**

- CIN – Andy Dalton – 23/30, 366 yards, TD, INT
- NYJ – Ryan Fitzpatrick – 19/35, 189 yards, 2 TD, INT

**Top rushers**

- CIN – Jeremy Hill – 9 rushes, 31 yards, TD
- NYJ – Matt Forte – 22 rushes, 96 yards

**Top receivers**

- CIN – A. J. Green – 12 receptions, 180 yards, TD
- NYJ – Matt Forte – 5 receptions, 59 yards

In a hard fought affair, Andy Dalton threw for 366 yards and a touchdown, but was sacked a career-high seven times. A. J. Green finished the game with 12 receptions for 180 yards plus a touchdown. The Bengals trailed by one with just over three minutes left in the game, but Dalton completed all four of his passes for 33 yards to set up Mike Nugent's go-ahead field goal with 54 seconds remaining. Three plays into the ensuing Jets' drive, Bengals' defensive back Josh Shaw recorded his first interception, picking off Ryan Fitzpatrick on a 3rd and 10 to seal a third straight season-opening victory for Cincinnati as they started 1–0.

The Bengals snapped their nine-game road losing streak against the Jets, winning on the road in New York for the first time since the 1981 season.

==== Week 2: at Pittsburgh Steelers ====
Week Two: Cincinnati Bengals at Pittsburgh Steelers – Game summary

Quarter	1	2	3	4	Total
Bengals	3	3	3	7	**16**
**Steelers**	7	3	7	7	**24**

at Heinz Field, Pittsburgh, Pennsylvania

- Date: September 18
- Game time: 1:00 pm. EDT
- Game weather: 72 °F (22 °C), cloudy
- Game attendance: 65,072
- Referee: Pete Morelli
- TV announcers (CBS): Ian Eagle, Dan Fouts and Evan Washburn
- Recap, Gamebook

Game information

**First quarter**

- PIT – Xavier Grimble 20-yard pass from Ben Roethlisberger (Chris Boswell kick), 3:46. Steelers 7–0. **Drive: 5 plays, 66 yards, 1:43.**
- CIN – Mike Nugent 25-yard field goal, 0:23. Steelers 7–3. **Drive: 8 plays, 68 yards, 3:23.**

**Second quarter**

- PIT – Chris Boswell 49-yard field goal, 4:10. Steelers 10–3. **Drive: 4 plays, 6 yards, 0:55.**
- CIN – Mike Nugent 33-yard field goal, 0:00. Steelers 10–6. **Drive: 8 plays, 53 yards, 0:48.**

**Third quarter**

- PIT – Jesse James 9-yard pass from Ben Roethlisberger (Chris Boswell kick), 6:16. Steelers 17–6. **Drive: 7 plays, 91 yards, 3:20.**
- CIN – Mike Nugent 21-yard field goal, 2:10. Steelers 17–9. **Drive: 10 plays, 72 yards, 4:06.**

**Fourth quarter**

- PIT – DeAngelo Williams 4-yard pass from Ben Roethlisberger (Chris Boswell kick), 6:48. Steelers 24–9. **Drive: 12 plays, 68 yards, 6:54.**
- CIN – Giovani Bernard 25-yard pass from Andy Dalton (Mike Nugent kick), 3:25. Steelers 24–16. **Drive: 8 plays, 75 yards, 3:23.**

**Top passers**

- CIN – Andy Dalton – 31/54, 366 yards, TD
- PIT – Ben Roethlisberger – 19/37, 259 yards, 3 TD, 2 INT

**Top rushers**

- CIN – Jeremy Hill – 11 rushes, 22 yards
- PIT – DeAngelo Williams – 32 rushes, 94 yards

**Top receivers**

- CIN – Giovani Bernard – 9 receptions, 100 yards, TD
- PIT – Sammie Coates – 2 receptions, 97 yards

On a rain-soaked Heinz Field, the Bengals' offense struggled to get much going against the Steelers. All three of the Bengals' red zone trips resulted in Mike Nugent field goals, while Pittsburgh quarterback Ben Roethlisberger threw three touchdowns. With just under seven minutes left in the game, Roethlisberger tossed a four-yard touchdown to running back DeAngelo Williams that gave Pittsburgh a 24–9 lead. The Bengals responded, however, as Andy Dalton drove Cincinnati to a quick score, finding Giovani Bernard on a 25-yard touchdown to make it 24–16. Trying to tie the game, Cincinnati drove to the Steelers' 39-yard line with two minutes left in the game, but rookie receiver Tyler Boyd's fumble sealed a Bengals loss. It appeared Boyd 's knee was down before he lost control of the ball on a hit by James Harrison, but upon review, the call stood and the Bengals dropped to 1–1. Dalton threw for 366 yards for the second straight week, giving him the NFL lead in passing yards (732) through two weeks.

==== Week 3: vs. Denver Broncos ====
Week Three: Denver Broncos at Cincinnati Bengals – Game summary

Quarter	1	2	3	4	Total
**Broncos**	3	13	0	13	**29**
Bengals	7	7	0	3	**17**

at Paul Brown Stadium, Cincinnati, Ohio

- Date: September 25
- Game time: 1:00 pm. EDT
- Game weather: 81 °F (27 °C), sunny
- Game attendance: 63,850
- Referee: John Parry
- TV announcers (CBS): Ian Eagle, Dan Fouts and Evan Washburn
- Recap, Gamebook

Game information

**First quarter**

- CIN – Jeremy Hill 3-yard run (Mike Nugent kick), 11:07. Bengals 7–0. **Drive: 5 plays, 74 yards, 2:50.**
- DEN – Brandon McManus 20-yard field goal, 4:05. Bengals 7–3. **Drive: 14 plays, 73 yards, 7:02.**

**Second quarter**

- DEN – Emmanuel Sanders 41-yard pass from Trevor Siemian (Brandon McManus kick), 13:57. Broncos 10–7. **Drive: 3 plays, 46 yards, 1:03.**
- CIN – Jeremy Hill 4-yard run (Mike Nugent kick), 4:57. Bengals 14–10. **Drive: 8 plays, 62 yards, 3:36.**
- DEN – Emmanuel Sanders 7-yard pass from Trevor Siemian (kick blocked), 0:28. Broncos 16–14. **Drive: 10 plays, 55 yards, 4:29.**

**Third quarter**

- No scoring plays

**Fourth quarter**

- CIN – Mike Nugent 34-yard field goal, 14:52. Bengals 17–16. **Drive: 15 plays, 60 yards, 8:18.**
- DEN – John Phillips 1-yard pass from Trevor Siemian (run failed), 6:56. Broncos 22–17. **Drive: 13 plays, 82 yards, 7:56.**
- DEN – Demaryius Thomas 55-yard pass from Trevor Siemian (Brandon McManus kick), 4:23. Broncos 29–17. **Drive: 4 plays, 83 yards, 1:39.**

**Top passers**

- DEN – Trevor Siemian – 23/35, 312 yards, 4 TD
- CIN – Andy Dalton – 21/31, 206 yards, INT

**Top rushers**

- DEN – C. J. Anderson – 14 rushes, 37 yards
- CIN – Jeremy Hill – 17 rushes, 97 yards, 2 TD

**Top receivers**

- DEN – Emmanuel Sanders – 9 receptions, 117 yards, 2 TD
- CIN – A. J. Green – 8 receptions, 77 yards

Hosting the defending Super Bowl champion Broncos, Andy Dalton's 300-yard streak was stopped, throwing for just 206 yards. It was also his second straight game in which he did not throw a touchdown pass. With the loss, the Bengals dropped to 1–2 and third place in the AFC North.

==== Week 4: vs. Miami Dolphins ====
Week Four: Miami Dolphins at Cincinnati Bengals – Game summary

Quarter	1	2	3	4	Total
Dolphins	7	0	0	0	**7**
**Bengals**	10	6	3	3	**22**

at Paul Brown Stadium, Cincinnati, Ohio

- Date: September 29
- Game time: 8:25 pm. EDT
- Game weather: 62 °F (17 °C), mostly cloudy
- Game attendance: 60,834
- Referee: Bill Vinovich
- TV announcers (NFLN): Jim Nantz, Phil Simms and Tracy Wolfson
- Recap, Gamebook

Game information

**First quarter**

- CIN – Mike Nugent 42-yard field goal, 9:51. Bengals 3–0. **Drive: 11 plays, 54 yards, 5:09.**
- MIA – Kenny Stills 74-yard pass from Ryan Tannehill (Andrew Franks kick), 9:04. Dolphins 7–3. **Drive: 2 plays, 81 yards, 0:47.**
- CIN – A. J. Green 7-yard pass from Andy Dalton (Mike Nugent kick), 3:19. Bengals 10–7. **Drive: 7 plays, 90 yards, 3:24.**

**Second quarter**

- CIN – Mike Nugent 22-yard field goal, 4:12. Bengals 13–7. **Drive: 14 plays, 80 yards, 8:25.**
- CIN – Mike Nugent 43-yard field goal, 1:06. Bengals 16–7. **Drive: 4 plays, 2 yards, 1:01.**

**Third quarter**

- CIN – Mike Nugent 22-yard field goal, 6:09. Bengals 19–7. **Drive: 9 plays, 85 yards, 4:16.**

**Fourth quarter**

- CIN – Mike Nugent 47-yard field goal, 13:30. Bengals 22–7. **Drive: 10 plays, 45 yards, 5:25.**

**Top passers**

- MIA – Ryan Tannehill – 15/25, 189 yards, TD, INT
- CIN – Andy Dalton – 22/31, 296 yards, TD

**Top rushers**

- MIA – Jay Ajayi – 6 rushes, 33 yards
- CIN – Jeremy Hill – 21 rushes, 71 yards

**Top receivers**

- MIA – Kenny Stills – 1 reception, 74 yards, TD
- CIN – A. J. Green – 10 receptions, 173 yards, TD

The Bengals wore white and black Color Rush uniforms for this game. With the win, the Bengals improved to 2–2.

==== Week 5: at Dallas Cowboys ====
Week Five: Cincinnati Bengals at Dallas Cowboys – Game summary

Quarter	1	2	3	4	Total
Bengals	0	0	0	14	**14**
**Cowboys**	7	14	7	0	**28**

at AT&T Stadium, Arlington, Texas

- Date: October 9
- Game time: 4:25 pm. EDT/3:25 p.m. CDT
- Game weather: Played indoors (retractable roof closed)
- Game attendance: 91,653
- Referee: Tony Corrente
- TV announcers (CBS): Jim Nantz, Phil Simms and Tracy Wolfson
- Recap, Gamebook

Game information

**First quarter**

- DAL – Ezekiel Elliott 13-yard run (Dan Bailey kick), 11:09. Cowboys 7–0. **Drive: 7 plays, 64 yards, 3:51.**

**Second quarter**

- DAL – Dak Prescott 5-yard run (Dan Bailey kick), 14:43. Cowboys 14–0. **Drive: 11 plays, 89 yards, 6:33.**
- DAL – Cole Beasley 14-yard pass from Dak Prescott (Dan Bailey kick), 4:09. Cowboys 21–0. **Drive: 8 plays, 80 yards, 3:38.**

**Third quarter**

- DAL – Ezekiel Elliott 60-yard run (Dan Bailey kick), 11:38. Cowboys 28–0. **Drive: 1 play, 60 yards, 0:09.**

**Fourth quarter**

- CIN – Brandon LaFell 7-yard pass from Andy Dalton (Mike Nugent kick), 10:10. Cowboys 28–7. **Drive: 10 plays, 59 yards, 5:13.**
- CIN – Brandon LaFell 5-yard pass from Andy Dalton (Mike Nugent kick), 2:39. Cowboys 28–14. **Drive: 12 plays, 77 yards, 5:03.**

**Top passers**

- CIN – Andy Dalton – 29/41, 269 yards, 2 TD
- DAL – Dak Prescott – 18/24, 227 yards, TD

**Top rushers**

- CIN – Giovani Bernard – 9 rushes, 50 yards
- DAL – Ezekiel Elliott – 15 rushes, 134 yards, 2 TD

**Top receivers**

- CIN – Brandon LaFell – 8 receptions, 68 yards, 2 TD
- DAL – Terrance Williams – 5 receptions, 70 yards

With the loss, the Bengals dropped to 2–3.

==== Week 6: at New England Patriots ====
Week Six: Cincinnati Bengals at New England Patriots – Game summary

Quarter	1	2	3	4	Total
Bengals	0	7	7	3	**17**
**Patriots**	3	7	15	10	**35**

at Gillette Stadium, Foxborough, Massachusetts

- Date: October 16
- Game time: 1:00 pm. EDT
- Game weather: 66 °F (19 °C), sunny
- Game attendance: 66,829
- Referee: Ronald Torbert
- TV announcers (CBS): Ian Eagle, Dan Fouts and Evan Washburn
- Recap, Gamebook

Game information

**First quarter**

- NE – Stephen Gostkowski 46-yard field goal, 12:06. Patriots 3–0. **Drive: 8 plays, 47 yards, 2:54.**

**Second quarter**

- CIN – Andy Dalton 2-yard run (Mike Nugent kick), 3:10. Bengals 7–3. **Drive: 7 plays, 60 yards, 3:26.**
- NE – James White 15-yard pass from Tom Brady (Stephen Gostkowski kick), 1:01. Patriots 10–7. **Drive: 8 plays, 75 yards, 2:09.**

**Third quarter**

- CIN – Brandon LaFell 5-yard pass from Andy Dalton (Mike Nugent kick), 11:14. Bengals 14–10. **Drive: 9 plays, 80 yards, 3:46.**
- NE – Andy Dalton sacked by Dont'a Hightower for a safety, 7:05. Bengals 14–12.
- NE – Rob Gronkowski 4-yard pass from Tom Brady (Stephen Gostkowski kick), 5:00. Patriots 19–14. **Drive: 5 plays, 68 yards, 2:05.**
- NE – James White 4-yard pass from Tom Brady (kick failed, wide left), 2:58. Patriots 25–14. **Drive: 4 plays, 53 yards, 1:35.**

**Fourth quarter**

- CIN – Mike Nugent 25-yard field goal, 12:34. Patriots 25–17. **Drive: 12 plays, 68 yards, 5:24.**
- NE – Stephen Gostkowski 31-yard field goal, 6:04. Patriots 28–17. **Drive: 12 plays, 62 yards, 6:30.**
- NE – LeGarrette Blount 1-yard run (Stephen Gostkowski kick), 0:57. Patriots 35–17. **Drive: 9 plays, 50 yards, 2:35.**

**Top passers**

- CIN – Andy Dalton – 21/31, 254 yards, TD
- NE – Tom Brady – 29/35, 376 yards, 3 TD

**Top rushers**

- CIN – Giovani Bernard – 15 rushes, 49 yards
- NE – LeGarrette Blount – 13 rushes, 50 yards, TD

**Top receivers**

- CIN – A. J. Green – 6 receptions, 88 yards
- NE – Rob Gronkowski – 7 receptions, 162 yards, TD

Newly acquired Brandon LaFell returned to New England for the first time after leaving the Patriots in the offseason. With the loss, the Bengals dropped to 2–4.

==== Week 7: vs. Cleveland Browns ====
Week Seven: Cleveland Browns at Cincinnati Bengals – Game summary

Quarter	1	2	3	4	Total
Browns	0	10	7	0	**17**
**Bengals**	7	14	10	0	**31**

at Paul Brown Stadium, Cincinnati, Ohio

- Date: October 23
- Game time: 1:00 pm. EDT
- Game weather: 65 °F (18 °C), sunny
- Game attendance: 65,047
- Referee: Ed Hochuli
- TV announcers (CBS): Andrew Catalon, Steve Beuerlein and Steve Tasker
- Recap, Gamebook

Game information

**First quarter**

- CIN – Giovani Bernard 5-yard run (Mike Nugent kick), 12:14. Bengals 7–0. **Drive: 7 plays, 75 yards, 2:46.**

**Second quarter**

- CLE – Cody Parkey 28-yard field goal, 13:26. Bengals 7–3. **Drive: 10 plays, 60 yards, 5:16.**
- CLE – Isaiah Crowell 1-yard run (Cody Parkey kick), 6:20. Browns 10–7. **Drive: 9 plays, 70 yards, 5:39.**
- CIN – Brandon LaFell 44-yard pass from Andy Dalton (Mike Nugent kick), 4:09. Bengals 14–10. **Drive: 5 plays, 80 yards, 2:11.**
- CIN – A. J. Green 48-yard pass from Andy Dalton (Mike Nugent kick), 0:00. Bengals 21–10. **Drive: 7 plays, 85 yards, 1:03.**

**Third quarter**

- CLE – Kevin Hogan 28-yard run (Cody Parkey kick), 10:43. Bengals 21–17. **Drive: 8 plays, 75 yards, 4:17.**
- CIN – Jeremy Hill 74-yard run (Mike Nugent kick), 9:47. Bengals 28–17. **Drive: 2 plays, 75 yards, 0:56.**
- CIN – Mike Nugent 36-yard field goal, 4:19. Bengals 31–17. **Drive: 7 plays, 66 yards, 3:16.**

**Fourth quarter**

- No scoring plays

**Top passers**

- CLE – Kevin Hogan – 12/24, 100 yards, 2 INT
- CIN – Andy Dalton – 19/28, 308 yards, 2 TD

**Top rushers**

- CLE – Kevin Hogan – 7 rushes, 104 yards, TD
- CIN – Jeremy Hill – 9 rushes, 168 yards, TD

**Top receivers**

- CLE – Gary Barnidge – 6 receptions, 66 yards
- CIN – A. J. Green – 8 receptions, 169 yards, TD

With their fourth straight win over the Browns, the Bengals improved to 3–4. With the Ravens' loss to the Jets, the Bengals moved into a tie for second in the AFC North.

==== Week 8: vs. Washington Redskins ====
NFL International Series

Week Eight: Washington Redskins at Cincinnati Bengals – Game summary

Quarter	1	2	3	4	OT	Total
Redskins	7	3	7	10	0	**27**
Bengals	7	0	13	7	0	**27**

at Wembley Stadium, London, United Kingdom

- Date: October 30
- Game time: 1:30 p.m. BST/9:30 am. EDT
- Game weather: 54 °F (12 °C), cloudy
- Game attendance: 84,488
- Referee: Carl Cheffers
- TV announcers (Fox): Kenny Albert, John Lynch and Pam Oliver
- Recap, Gamebook

Game information

**First quarter**

- WAS – Robert Kelley 4-yard run (Dustin Hopkins kick), 7:38. Redskins 7–0. **Drive: 15 plays, 80 yards, 7:22.**
- CIN – Giovani Bernard 8-yard run (Mike Nugent kick), 3:51. Tied 7–7. **Drive: 7 plays, 36 yards, 3:47.**

**Second quarter**

- WAS – Dustin Hopkins 20-yard field goal, 8:16. Redskins 10–7. **Drive: 9 plays, 77 yards, 4:04.**

**Third quarter**

- CIN – Tyler Eifert 15-yard pass from Andy Dalton (kick failed, wide left), 10:42. Bengals 13–10. **Drive: 11 plays, 75 yards, 4:18.**
- CIN – Andy Dalton 1-yard run (Mike Nugent kick), 5:15. Bengals 20–10. **Drive: 10 plays, 64 yards, 3:58.**
- WAS – Jordan Reed 23-yard pass from Kirk Cousins (Dustin Hopkins kick), 3:02. Bengals 20–17. **Drive: 5 plays, 91 yards, 2:13.**

**Fourth quarter**

- WAS – Jamison Crowder 33-yard pass from Kirk Cousins (Dustin Hopkins kick), 9:30. Redskins 24–20. **Drive: 7 plays, 83 yards, 4:18.**
- CIN – Jeremy Hill 1-yard run (Mike Nugent kick), 6:54. Bengals 27–24. **Drive: 6 plays, 75 yards, 2:36.**
- WAS – Dustin Hopkins 40-yard field goal, 1:07. Tied 27–27. **Drive: 10 plays, 45 yards, 2:08.**

**Overtime**

- No scoring plays

**Top passers**

- WAS – Kirk Cousins – 38/56, 458 yards, 2 TD, INT
- CIN – Andy Dalton – 27/42, 284 yards, TD, INT

**Top rushers**

- WAS – Robert Kelley – 21 rushes, 87 yards, TD
- CIN – Jeremy Hill – 20 rushes, 76 yards, TD

**Top receivers**

- WAS – Jamison Crowder – 9 receptions, 107 yards, TD
- CIN – A. J. Green – 9 receptions, 121 yards

The Bengals hosted the Washington Redskins in London between a shootout between Kirk Cousins and Andy Dalton. Unfortunately, the Bengals could not score in overtime nor the Redskins and thus allowed a tie for the third time in 10 years and first tie since tying with the Carolina Panthers 37–37 in 2014, leaving their record at 3–4–1.

==== Week 10: at New York Giants ====
Week Ten: Cincinnati Bengals at New York Giants – Game summary

Quarter	1	2	3	4	Total
Bengals	7	3	10	0	**20**
**Giants**	7	7	0	7	**21**

at MetLife Stadium, East Rutherford, New Jersey

- Date: November 14
- Game time: 8:30 pm. EST
- Game weather: 56 °F (13 °C), cloudy
- Game attendance: 76,218
- Referee: John Parry
- TV announcers (ESPN): Sean McDonough, Jon Gruden and Lisa Salters
- Recap, Gamebook

Game information

**First quarter**

- NYG – Jerell Adams 10-yard pass from Eli Manning (Robbie Gould kick), 11:05. Giants 7–0. **Drive: 8 plays, 80 yards, 3:55.**
- CIN – A. J. Green 13-yard pass from Andy Dalton (Mike Nugent kick), 8:58. Tied 7–7. **Drive: 3 plays, 80 yards, 2:07.**

**Second quarter**

- CIN – Mike Nugent 25-yard field goal, 4:19. Bengals 10–7. **Drive: 4 plays, 0 yards, 0:54.**
- NYG – Odell Beckham Jr. 10-yard pass from Eli Manning (Robbie Gould kick), 1:17. Giants 14–10. **Drive: 8 plays, 75 yards, 3:02.**

**Third quarter**

- CIN – Jeremy Hill 9-yard run (Mike Nugent kick), 13:58. Bengals 17–14. **Drive: 2 plays, 13 yards, 1:02.**
- CIN – Mike Nugent 38-yard field goal, 8:52. Bengals 20–14. **Drive: 7 plays, 41 yards, 3:33.**

**Fourth quarter**

- NYG – Sterling Shepard 3-yard pass from Eli Manning (Robbie Gould kick), 14:05. Giants 21–20. **Drive: 7 plays, 47 yards, 2:51.**

**Top passers**

- CIN – Andy Dalton – 16/29, 204 yards, TD, INT
- NYG – Eli Manning – 28/44, 240 yards, 3 TD, 2 INT

**Top rushers**

- CIN – Jeremy Hill – 15 rushes, 46 yards, TD
- NYG – Rashad Jennings – 15 rushes, 87 yards

**Top receivers**

- CIN – Tyler Eifert – 3 receptions, 96 yards
- NYG – Odell Beckham Jr. – 10 receptions, 97 yards, TD

With the loss, the Bengals fell to 3–5–1. They also fell to 0–4 all time against the Giants on the road.

==== Week 11: vs. Buffalo Bills ====
Week Eleven: Buffalo Bills at Cincinnati Bengals – Game summary

Quarter	1	2	3	4	Total
**Bills**	7	3	3	3	**16**
Bengals	6	6	0	0	**12**

at Paul Brown Stadium, Cincinnati, Ohio

- Date: November 20
- Game time: 1:00 pm. EST
- Game weather: 36 °F (2 °C), partly cloudy
- Game attendance: 61,356
- Referee: Terry McAulay
- TV announcers (Fox): Thom Brennaman, Charles Davis, Chris Spielman and Peter Schrager
- Recap, Gamebook

Game information

**First quarter**

- BUF – LeSean McCoy 7-yard run (Dan Carpenter kick), 8:52. Bills 7–0. **Drive: 8 plays, 75 yards, 4:23.**
- CIN – Andy Dalton 2-yard run (kick failed, hit right upright), 2:34. Bills 7–6. **Drive: 13 plays, 75 yards, 6:18.**

**Second quarter**

- BUF – Dan Carpenter 26-yard field goal, 9:03. Bills 10–6. **Drive: 4 plays, −5 yards, 2:05.**
- CIN – Tyler Boyd 1-yard pass from Andy Dalton (kick failed, hit right upright), 3:10. Bengals 12–10. **Drive: 13 plays, 66 yards, 5:53.**

**Third quarter**

- BUF – Dan Carpenter 54-yard field goal, 10:25. Bills 13–12. **Drive: 8 plays, 32 yards, 4:35.**

**Fourth quarter**

- BUF – Dan Carpenter 20-yard field goal, 12:05. Bills 16–12. **Drive: 15 plays, 88 yards, 8:12.**

**Top passers**

- BUF – Tyrod Taylor – 19/27, 166 yards, INT
- CIN – Andy Dalton – 24/43, 207 yards, TD, 2 INT

**Top rushers**

- BUF – Mike Gillislee – 14 rushes, 72 yards
- CIN – Jeremy Hill – 16 rushes, 62 yards

**Top receivers**

- BUF – Brandon Tate – 2 receptions, 48 yards
- CIN – Tyler Boyd – 6 receptions, 54 yards, TD

Not only did the Bengals lose 16–12 and drop to 3–6–1, but lost star wide receiver A. J. Green to a pulled hamstring in the first quarter.

==== Week 12: at Baltimore Ravens ====
Week Twelve: Cincinnati Bengals at Baltimore Ravens – Game summary

Quarter	1	2	3	4	Total
Bengals	0	3	6	5	**14**
**Ravens**	10	6	0	3	**19**

at M&T Bank Stadium, Baltimore, Maryland

- Date: November 27
- Game time: 1:00 pm. EST
- Game weather: 50 °F (10 °C), sunny
- Game attendance: 70,903
- Referee: Clete Blakeman
- TV announcers (CBS): Ian Eagle, Dan Fouts and Evan Washburn
- Recap, Gamebook

Game information

**First quarter**

- BAL – Breshad Perriman 14-yard pass from Joe Flacco (Justin Tucker kick), 10:15. Ravens 7–0. **Drive: 11 plays, 75 yards, 4:45.**
- BAL – Justin Tucker 52-yard field goal, 5:39. Ravens 10–0. **Drive: 7 plays, 2 yards, 2:41.**

**Second quarter**

- CIN – Mike Nugent 23-yard field goal, 14:50. Ravens 10–3. **Drive: 14 plays, 69 yards, 5:49.**
- BAL – Justin Tucker 57-yard field goal, 1:40. Ravens 13–3. **Drive: 7 plays, 41 yards, 2:55.**
- BAL – Justin Tucker 54-yard field goal, 0:00. Ravens 16–3. **Drive: 7 plays, 37 yards, 1:01.**

**Third quarter**

- CIN – Tyler Eifert 3-yard pass from Andy Dalton (kick failed, wide right), 4:16. Ravens 16–9. **Drive: 11 plays, 86 yards, 4:58.**

**Fourth quarter**

- BAL – Justin Tucker 36-yard field goal, 12:16. Ravens 19–9. **Drive: 12 plays, 59 yards, 7:00.**
- CIN – Mike Nugent 36-yard field goal, 6:00. Ravens 19–12. **Drive: 9 plays, 35 yards, 2:50.**
- CIN – Sam Koch out of bounds in end zone for a safety, 0:00. Ravens 19–14.

**Top passers**

- CIN – Andy Dalton – 26/48, 283 yards, TD
- BAL – Joe Flacco – 25/36, 234 yards, TD, INT

**Top rushers**

- CIN – Rex Burkhead – 5 rushes, 29 yards
- BAL – Kenneth Dixon – 13 rushes, 49 yards

**Top receivers**

- CIN – Tyler Eifert – 5 receptions, 68 yards, TD
- BAL – Mike Wallace – 3 receptions, 57 yards

With the loss, the Bengals fell to 3–7–1. Also, their 5-game winning streak against the Ravens was snapped.

==== Week 13: vs. Philadelphia Eagles ====
Week Thirteen: Philadelphia Eagles at Cincinnati Bengals – Game summary

Quarter	1	2	3	4	Total
Eagles	0	0	7	7	**14**
**Bengals**	10	9	10	3	**32**

at Paul Brown Stadium, Cincinnati, Ohio

- Date: December 4
- Game time: 1:00 pm. EST
- Game weather: 42 °F (6 °C), cloudy
- Game attendance: 55,456
- Referee: Jeff Triplette
- TV announcers (Fox): Thom Brennaman, Charles Davis and Peter Schrager
- Recap, Gamebook

Game information

**First quarter**

- CIN – Mike Nugent 32-yard field goal, 10:22. Bengals 3–0. **Drive: 8 plays, 39 yards, 3:43.**
- CIN – Jeremy Hill 2-yard run (Mike Nugent kick), 1:32. Bengals 10–0. **Drive: 8 plays, 81 yards, 4:12.**

**Second quarter**

- CIN – Mike Nugent 33-yard field goal, 6:23. Bengals 13–0. **Drive: 7 plays, 44 yards, 2:46.**
- CIN – Tyler Eifert 13-yard pass from Andy Dalton (kick failed, wide right), 0:07. Bengals 19–0. **Drive: 12 plays, 93 yards, 3:07.**

**Third quarter**

- CIN – Brandon LaFell 8-yard pass from Andy Dalton (Mike Nugent kick), 11:21. Bengals 26–0. **Drive: 8 plays, 77 yards, 3:39.**
- CIN – Mike Nugent 26-yard field goal, 4:07. Bengals 29–0. **Drive: 10 plays, 78 yards, 4:53.**
- PHI – Zach Ertz 13-yard pass from Carson Wentz (Caleb Sturgis kick), 2:30. Bengals 29–7. **Drive: 6 plays, 38 yards, 1:37.**

**Fourth quarter**

- PHI – Darren Sproles 2-yard run (Caleb Sturgis kick), 6:53. Bengals 29–14. **Drive: 15 plays, 61 yards, 6:04.**
- CIN – Mike Nugent 38-yard field goal, 2:50. Bengals 32–14. **Drive: 4 plays, 0 yards, 1:02.**

**Top passers**

- PHI – Carson Wentz – 36/60, 308 yards, TD, 3 INT
- CIN – Andy Dalton – 23/31, 332 yards, 2 TD

**Top rushers**

- PHI – Wendell Smallwood – 8 rushes, 19 yards
- CIN – Rex Burkhead – 8 rushes, 38 yards

**Top receivers**

- PHI – Paul Turner – 6 receptions, 80 yards
- CIN – Brandon LaFell – 5 receptions, 95 yards, TD

With the win, the Bengals improved to 4–7–1. They also improved to 4–0–1 all time at home against Philadelphia.

==== Week 14: at Cleveland Browns ====
Week Fourteen: Cincinnati Bengals at Cleveland Browns – Game summary

Quarter	1	2	3	4	Total
**Bengals**	13	7	0	3	**23**
Browns	0	0	7	3	**10**

at FirstEnergy Stadium, Cleveland, Ohio

- Date: December 11
- Game time: 1:00 pm. EST
- Game weather: 28 °F (−2 °C), snow
- Game attendance: 60,028
- Referee: Gene Steratore
- TV announcers (CBS): Andrew Catalon, Steve Beuerlein and Steve Tasker
- Recap, Gamebook

Game information

**First quarter**

- CIN – Tyler Eifert 14-yard pass from Andy Dalton (Mike Nugent kick), 12:21. Bengals 7–0. **Drive: 6 plays, 73 yards, 2:39.**
- CIN – Jeremy Hill 1-yard run (kick short), 6:27. Bengals 13–0. **Drive: 9 plays, 45 yards, 4:49.**

**Second quarter**

- CIN – Tyler Eifert 5-yard pass from Andy Dalton (Mike Nugent kick), 5:06. Bengals 20–0. **Drive: 5 plays, 26 yards, 2:37.**

**Third quarter**

- CLE – Robert Griffin III 1-yard run (Cody Parkey kick), 8:11. Bengals 20–7. **Drive: 10 plays, 80 yards, 4:40.**

**Fourth quarter**

- CLE – Cody Parkey 30-yard field goal, 14:14. Bengals 20–10. **Drive: 10 plays, 69 yards, 4:06.**
- CIN – Mike Nugent 44-yard field goal, 8:38. Bengals 23–10. **Drive: 11 plays, 57 yards, 5:36.**

**Top passers**

- CIN – Andy Dalton – 20/28, 180 yards, 2 TD
- CLE – Robert Griffin III – 12/28, 104 yards, INT

**Top rushers**

- CIN – Jeremy Hill – 25 rushes, 111 yards, TD
- CLE – Isaiah Crowell – 10 rushes, 113 yards

**Top receivers**

- CIN – Tyler Boyd – 6 receptions, 49 yards
- CLE – Gary Barnidge – 3 receptions, 27 yards

With the win, the Bengals improved to 5–7–1, and swept the Browns for the first time since 2011.

==== Week 15: vs. Pittsburgh Steelers ====
Week Fifteen: Pittsburgh Steelers at Cincinnati Bengals – Game summary

Quarter	1	2	3	4	Total
**Steelers**	3	6	6	9	**24**
Bengals	10	10	0	0	**20**

at Paul Brown Stadium, Cincinnati, Ohio

- Date: December 18
- Game time: 1:00 pm. EST
- Game weather: 24 °F (−4 °C), cloudy
- Game attendance: 62,096
- Referee: Bill Vinovich
- TV announcers (CBS): Ian Eagle, Dan Fouts and Evan Washburn
- Recap, Gamebook

Game information

**First quarter**

- CIN – Randy Bullock 23-yard field goal, 7:39. Bengals 3–0. **Drive: 14 plays, 70 yards, 7:21.**
- PIT – Chris Boswell 45-yard field goal, 3:42. Tied 3–3. **Drive: 7 plays, 28 yards, 3:57.**
- CIN – Andy Dalton 1-yard run (Randy Bullock kick), 0:00. Bengals 10–3. **Drive: 8 plays, 64 yards, 3:42.**

**Second quarter**

- CIN – Jeremy Hill 4-yard run (Randy Bullock kick), 9:02. Bengals 17–3. **Drive: 10 plays, 82 yards, 4:16.**
- PIT – Chris Boswell 49-yard field goal, 5:25. Bengals 17–6. **Drive: 8 plays, 50 yards, 3:37.**
- CIN – Randy Bullock 22-yard field goal, 2:51. Bengals 20–6. **Drive: 7 plays, 22 yards, 2:34.**
- PIT – Chris Boswell 49-yard field goal, 0:06. Bengals 20–9. **Drive: 11 plays, 54 yards, 2:45.**

**Third quarter**

- PIT – Chris Boswell 40-yard field goal, 10:38. Bengals 20–12. **Drive: 9 plays, 53 yards, 4:22.**
- PIT – Chris Boswell 49-yard field goal, 2:05. Bengals 20–15. **Drive: 9 plays, 39 yards, 4:18.**

**Fourth quarter**

- PIT – Chris Boswell 30-yard field goal, 12:25. Bengals 20–18. **Drive: 6 plays, 22 yards, 2:36.**
- PIT – Eli Rogers 24-yard pass from Ben Roethlisberger (pass failed), 7:29. Steelers 24–20. **Drive: 5 plays, 69 yards, 3:22.**

**Top passers**

- PIT – Ben Roethlisberger – 21/36, 286 yards, TD
- CIN – Andy Dalton – 16/27, 157 yards, INT

**Top rushers**

- PIT – Le'Veon Bell – 23 rushes, 93 yards
- CIN – Jeremy Hill – 20 rushes, 43 yards, TD

**Top receivers**

- PIT – Eli Rogers – 5 receptions, 75 yards, TD
- CIN – Brandon LaFell – 7 receptions, 91 yards

With their fourth straight loss to the Steelers, the Bengals fell to 5–8–1. The game was just a few moments away from wrapping up when the Baltimore Ravens beat the Philadelphia Eagles 28-27. As a result, the Cincinnati Bengals were eliminated from playoff contention no matter the outcome. The Bengals were condemned to their first losing season since 2010.

==== Week 16: at Houston Texans ====
Week Sixteen: Cincinnati Bengals at Houston Texans – Game summary

Quarter	1	2	3	4	Total
Bengals	0	3	0	7	**10**
**Texans**	0	0	3	9	**12**

at NRG Stadium, Houston, Texas

- Date: December 24
- Game time: 8:25 pm. EST/7:25 pm. CST
- Game weather: Played indoors (retractable roof closed)
- Game attendance: 71,836
- Referee: Carl Cheffers
- TV announcers (NFLN): Kevin Harlan and Rich Gannon
- Recap, Gamebook

Game information

**First quarter**

- No scoring plays

**Second quarter**

- CIN – Randy Bullock 43-yard field goal, 0:00. Bengals 3–0. **Drive: 14 plays, 67 yards, 4:58.**

**Third quarter**

- HOU – Nick Novak 25-yard field goal, 9:05. Tied 3–3. **Drive: 11 plays, 68 yards, 5:55.**

**Fourth quarter**

- HOU – Nick Novak 22-yard field goal, 13:31. Texans 6–3. **Drive: 12 plays, 71 yards, 6:34.**
- CIN – Brandon LaFell 86-yard pass from Andy Dalton (Randy Bullock kick), 10:45. Bengals 10–6. **Drive: 3 plays, 91 yards, 0:55.**
- HOU – Alfred Blue 24-yard run (kick blocked), 8:41. Texans 12–10. **Drive: 4 plays, 75 yards, 2:04.**

**Top passers**

- CIN – Andy Dalton – 28/41, 268 yards, TD, INT
- HOU – Tom Savage – 18/29, 176 yards

**Top rushers**

- CIN – Rex Burkhead – 12 rushes, 42 yards
- HOU – Alfred Blue – 21 rushes, 73 yards, TD

**Top receivers**

- CIN – Brandon LaFell – 6 receptions, 130 yards, TD
- HOU – DeAndre Hopkins – 3 receptions, 43 yards

As time expired, Randy Bullock missed the game-winning field goal sending the Bengals to 5–9–1. Dalton also set a new career-high of losses in a single season.

==== Week 17: vs. Baltimore Ravens ====
Week Seventeen: Baltimore Ravens at Cincinnati Bengals – Game summary

Quarter	1	2	3	4	Total
Ravens	3	0	0	7	**10**
**Bengals**	14	6	0	7	**27**

at Paul Brown Stadium, Cincinnati, Ohio

- Date: January 1, 2017
- Game time: 1:00 pm. EST
- Game weather: 40 °F (4 °C), partly cloudy
- Game attendance: 54,944
- Referee: Pete Morelli
- TV announcers (CBS): Carter Blackburn and Chris Simms
- Recap, Gamebook

Game information

**First quarter**

- CIN – Rex Burkhead 5-yard run (Randy Bullock kick), 10:17. Bengals 7–0. **Drive: 8 plays, 59 yards, 3:49.**
- BAL – Justin Tucker 30-yard field goal, 3:12. Bengals 7–3. **Drive: 13 plays, 63 yards, 7:05.**
- CIN – C. J. Uzomah 1-yard pass from Andy Dalton (Randy Bullock kick), 0:00. Bengals 14–3. **Drive: 6 plays, 60 yards, 3:12.**

**Second quarter**

- CIN – Randy Bullock 23-yard field goal, 6:09. Bengals 17–3. **Drive: 12 plays, 77 yards, 4:57.**
- CIN – Randy Bullock 24-yard field goal, 0:03. Bengals 20–3. **Drive: 8 plays, 74 yards, 2:25.**

**Third quarter**

- No scoring plays

**Fourth quarter**

- BAL – Kenneth Dixon 1-yard run (Justin Tucker kick), 8:37. Bengals 20–10. **Drive: 8 plays, 70 yards, 3:12.**
- CIN – Rex Burkhead 5-yard run (Randy Bullock kick), 2:20. Bengals 27–10. **Drive: 6 plays, 25 yards, 2:24.**

**Top passers**

- BAL – Joe Flacco – 32/49, 267 yards, INT
- CIN – Andy Dalton – 18/28, 226 yards, TD

**Top rushers**

- BAL – Kenneth Dixon – 10 rushes, 44 yards, TD
- CIN – Rex Burkhead – 27 rushes, 119 yards, 2 TD

**Top receivers**

- BAL – Dennis Pitta – 11 receptions, 91 yards
- CIN – Cody Core – 4 receptions, 82 yards

With their 6th win over Baltimore in 7 games, the Bengals ended their season at 6–9–1.

== Standings ==
=== Division ===
AFC North
	W	L	T	PCT	DIV	CONF	PF	PA	STK
^{(3)} Pittsburgh Steelers	11	5	0	.688	5–1	9–3	399	327	W7
Baltimore Ravens	8	8	0	.500	4–2	7–5	343	321	L2
Cincinnati Bengals	6	9	1	.406	3–3	5–7	325	315	W1
Cleveland Browns	1	15	0	.063	0–6	1–11	264	452	L1

=== Conference ===
AFC
#	Team	Division	W	L	T	PCT	DIV	CONF	SOS	SOV	STK
Division leaders
1	New England Patriots	East	14	2	0	.875	5–1	11–1	.439	.424	W7
2 (Note: Kansas City clinched the AFC West division over Oakland based on head-to-head sweep.)	Kansas City Chiefs	West	12	4	0	.750	6–0	9–3	.508	.479	W2
3	Pittsburgh Steelers	North	11	5	0	.688	5–1	9–3	.494	.423	W7
4 (Note: Houston clinched the AFC South division title over Tennessee based on record vs. division opponents.)	Houston Texans	South	9	7	0	.563	5–1	7–5	.502	.427	L1
Wild Cards
5	Oakland Raiders	West	12	4	0	.750	3–3	9–3	.504	.443	L1
6	Miami Dolphins	East	10	6	0	.625	4–2	7–5	.455	.341	L1
Did not qualify for the postseason
7 (Note: Tennessee finished ahead of Denver based on head-to-head victory.)	Tennessee Titans	South	9	7	0	.563	2–4	6–6	.465	.458	W1
8	Denver Broncos	West	9	7	0	.563	2–4	6–6	.549	.455	W1
9 (Note: Baltimore finished ahead of Indianapolis based on record vs. conference opponents.)	Baltimore Ravens	North	8	8	0	.500	4–2	7–5	.498	.363	L2
10	Indianapolis Colts	South	8	8	0	.500	3–3	5–7	.492	.406	W1
11	Buffalo Bills	East	7	9	0	.438	1–5	4–8	.482	.339	L2
12	Cincinnati Bengals	North	6	9	1	.406	3–3	5–7	.521	.333	W1
13 (Note: The New York Jets finished ahead of San Diego based record vs. common opponents — the Jets' cumulative record against Cleveland, Indianapolis, Kansas City and Miami was 1–4, while San Diego's cumulative record against the same four teams was 0–5.)	New York Jets	East	5	11	0	.313	2–4	4–8	.518	.313	W1
14	San Diego Chargers	West	5	11	0	.313	1–5	4–8	.543	.513	L5
15	Jacksonville Jaguars	South	3	13	0	.188	2–4	2–10	.527	.417	L1
16	Cleveland Browns	North	1	15	0	.063	0–6	1–11	.549	.313	L1
Tiebreakers (Note: When breaking ties for three or more teams under the NFL's rules, they are first broken within divisions, then comparing only the highest ranked remaining team from each division.)

== Staff ==
2016 Cincinnati Bengals staff
Front office: President/general manager – Mike Brown; Senior vice president of player personnel – Pete Brown; Executive vice president – Katie Blackburn; Vice president of player personnel – Paul H. Brown; Director of player personnel – Duke Tobin; Head coaches: Head coach – Marvin Lewis; Assistant head coach/offensive line – Paul Alexander; Offensive coaches: Offensive coordinator – Ken Zampese; Quarterbacks – Bill Lazor; Running backs – Kyle Caskey; Wide receivers – James Urban; Tight ends – Jonathan Hayes; Offensive assistant/wide receivers – Dan Pitcher; Offensive quality control/assistant offensive line – Brian Braswell; Offensive quality control/offensive line – Robert Couch	Defensive coaches: Defensive coordinator – Paul Guenther; Defensive line – Jacob Burney; Linebackers – Jim Haslett; Defensive backs – Kevin Coyle; Assistant defensive backs – Robert Livingston; Defensive quality control/assistant linebackers – David Lippincott; Defensive quality control/defensive line – Marcus Lewis; Special teams coaches: Special teams coordinator – Darrin Simmons; Assistant special teams/defensive quality control – Brayden Coombs; Strength and conditioning: Head strength and conditioning – Chip Morton; Assistant strength and conditioning – Jeff Friday

== Final roster ==
2016 Cincinnati Bengals roster
Quarterbacks (QB): 14 Andy Dalton; 6 Jeff Driskel; 5 A. J. McCarron; Running backs (RB): 33 Rex Burkhead; 39 Tra Carson; 32 Jeremy Hill; 30 Cedric Peerman; Wide receivers (WR): 83 Tyler Boyd; 16 Cody Core; 12 Alex Erickson; 84 Jake Kumerow; 11 Brandon LaFell; 86 James Wright; Tight ends (TE): 89 Ryan Hewitt; 81 Tyler Kroft; 87 C. J. Uzomah	Offensive linemen (OL): 61 Russell Bodine C; 74 Jake Fisher T; 66 Trey Hopkins G; 60 T. J. Johnson G/C; 63 Christian Westerman G; 77 Andrew Whitworth T; 73 Eric Winston G/T; 68 Kevin Zeitler G; Defensive linemen (DL): 97 Geno Atkins DT; 93 Will Clarke DE; 96 Carlos Dunlap DE; 95 Wallace Gilberry DE; 99 Margus Hunt DE; 90 Michael Johnson DE; 94 Domata Peko DT; 92 Pat Sims DT; 69 DeShawn Williams DT	Linebackers (LB): 55 Vontaze Burfict OLB; 56 Karlos Dansby OLB; 47 Paul Dawson OLB; 53 Marquis Flowers OLB; 58 Rey Maualuga MLB; 57 Vincent Rey; 52 Trevor Roach; 59 Nick Vigil OLB; Defensive backs (DB): 21 Darqueze Dennard CB; 42 Clayton Fejedelem SS; 43 George Iloka SS; 24 Adam Jones CB; 27 Dre Kirkpatrick CB; 20 KeiVarae Russell CB; 26 Josh Shaw CB/S; 31 Derron Smith FS; 36 Shawn Williams FS; Special teams (ST): 46 Clark Harris LS; 10 Kevin Huber P; 4 Randy Bullock K	Practice squad: 76 Ryan Brown DE; 71 David Dean DT; 29 Tony McRae CB; 62 Alex Redmond G; 17 Alonzo Russell WR; Reserve: 25 Giovani Bernard RB (IR); 75 Andrew Billings DT (IR); 65 Clint Boling G (IR); 23 Chykie Brown CB (IR); 85 Tyler Eifert TE (IR); 18 A. J. Green WR (IR); 91 Marcus Hardison DT (IR); 22 William Jackson CB (IR); 70 Cedric Ogbuehi T (IR); 98 Brandon Thompson DT (PUP); Rookies in italics 53 active, 10 reserve, 5 practice squad
