= Ryan Hewitt =

American football player (born 1991)

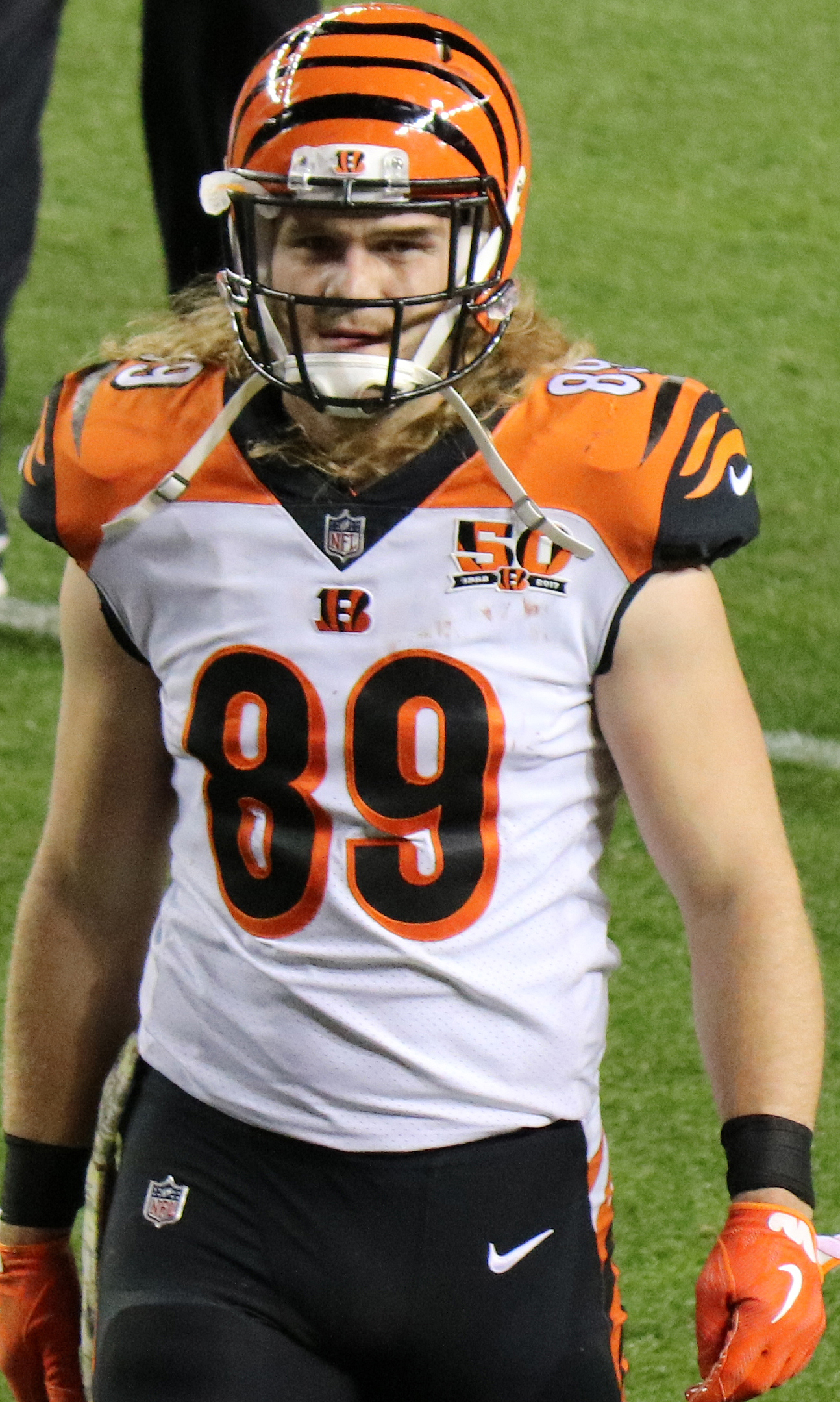
- Hewitt with the Cincinnati Bengals in 2017.

No. 89, 45
- Position: Tight end

Personal information
- Born: January 24, 1991 (age 35); Denver, Colorado, U.S.
- Listed height: 6 ft 4 in (1.93 m)
- Listed weight: 255 lb (116 kg)

Career information
- High school: Mullen (Denver)
- College: Stanford
- NFL draft: 2014: undrafted

Career history
- Cincinnati Bengals (2014–2017); Indianapolis Colts (2018); Tennessee Titans (2019)*
- * Offseason or practice squad member only

Career NFL statistics
- Receptions: 23
- Receiving yards: 221
- Receiving touchdowns: 1
- Stats at Pro Football Reference

Ryan Michael Hewitt (born January 24, 1991) is an American former professional football player who was a tight end and fullback. He played college football for the Stanford Cardinal and was signed by the Cincinnati Bengals as an undrafted free agent in 2014.

== College career ==
Hewitt played college football at Stanford University from 2009 to 2013. He finished his collegiate career with 59 receptions for 473 yards and six touchdowns.

== Professional career ==
=== Cincinnati Bengals ===
Hewitt was signed by the Cincinnati Bengals after going undrafted in the 2014 NFL draft. He won a training camp battle with veteran fullback John Conner to secure a spot on the Bengals final roster.

Hewitt had 10 receptions for 86 yards during his rookie season, and finished eighth in Pro Football Focus's lead blocker rankings. He has established himself as a versatile weapon for Cincinnati, playing the H-back position and blocking for running plays while also catching passes out of the backfield and from the tight end position.

On September 1, 2018, Hewitt was released by the Bengals as a part of final roster cuts before the start of the 2018 season.

=== Indianapolis Colts ===
On September 3, 2018, Hewitt was signed by the Indianapolis Colts.

=== Tennessee Titans ===
On June 13, 2019, Hewitt signed with the Tennessee Titans. He was released on August 31, 2019.
