= Christian Westerman =

American football player (born 1993)

No. 63
- Position: Offensive guard

Personal information
- Born: February 23, 1993 (age 33); Chandler, Arizona, U.S.
- Listed height: 6 ft 3 in (1.91 m)
- Listed weight: 315 lb (143 kg)

Career information
- High school: Hamilton (Chandler)
- College: Arizona State
- NFL draft: 2016: 5th round, 161st overall pick

Career history
- Cincinnati Bengals (2016–2018)

Awards and highlights
- Second-team All-Pac-12 (2015)

Career NFL statistics
- Games played: 16
- Games started: 2
- Stats at Pro Football Reference

Christian Westerman (born February 23, 1993) is an American former professional football player who was an offensive guard in the National Football League (NFL). He played college football for the Arizona State Sun Devils. He was selected by the Cincinnati Bengals in the fifth round of the 2016 NFL draft.

== Early life ==
A native of Chandler, Arizona, Westerman attended Hamilton High School, where he was an All-American offensive lineman. Regarded as a four-star recruit by Rivals.com, Westerman was ranked as the No. 3 offensive tackle in his class.

== College career ==
Westerman attended Auburn University for two seasons before transferring to Arizona State University in December 2012.

== Professional career ==
Pre-draft measurables
Height	Weight	Arm length	Hand span	40-yard dash	10-yard split	20-yard split	20-yard shuttle	Three-cone drill	Vertical jump	Broad jump	Bench press
6 ft 3 1/8 in (1.91 m)	298 lb (135 kg)	33 1/2 in (0.85 m)	11 7/8 in (0.30 m)	5.17 s	1.79 s	2.98 s	4.71 s	7.69 s	25 in (0.64 m)	8 ft 2 in (2.49 m)	34 reps
All values from NFL Combine

Westerman was drafted by the Cincinnati Bengals in the fifth round, 161st overall, in the 2016 NFL draft.

On May 17, 2016, Westerman signed his four-year, $2.57 million rookie contract, with a signing bonus of $231,696. He was inactive for all but one game his rookie season and didn't record any snaps.

In 2017, Westerman started two games at left guard.

On August 16, 2019, the Bengals placed Westerman on the exempt/left squad list after announcing his plans to retire. However five days later, Westerman rejoined the team after deciding not to retire. He was waived during final roster cuts on August 30, 2019.
