= Jacob Burney =

American football player and coach (born 1959)

Personal information
- Born: January 24, 1959 (age 67); Chattanooga, Tennessee, U.S.

Career information
- High school: Chattanooga (TN) Tyner Academy
- College: Chattanooga

Career history
- New Mexico (1983–1986) Defensive line coach; Tulsa (1987) Defensive line coach; Mississippi State (1988) Inside linebackers coach; Wisconsin (1989) Defensive line coach; UCLA (1990–1992) Defensive line coach; Tennessee (1993) Defensive line coach; Cleveland Browns (1994–1995) Defensive line coach; Baltimore Ravens (1996–1998) Defensive line coach; Carolina Panthers (1999–2001) Defensive line coach; Denver Broncos (2002–2004) Defensive line coach; Denver Broncos (2005–2006) Defensive line coach/defensive ends coach; Denver Broncos (2007–2008) Defensive line coach; Washington Redskins (2010–2014) Defensive line coach; Cincinnati Bengals (2016–2018) Defensive line coach

Jacob Burney (born January 24, 1959) is an American football coach and former player.

== Playing career ==
Burney was a three-time all-conference defensive tackle at the University of Tennessee at Chattanooga, receiving Honorable Mention All-American status in 1978 and 1980.

== Coaching career ==
He coached in the college ranks for 11 years for the University of New Mexico, University of Tulsa, Mississippi State University, University of Wisconsin, UCLA, and University of Tennessee.

In 1994, he joined the Cleveland Browns to become their defensive line coach; he stayed there until 1998. In 1999, he joined the Carolina Panthers to be their defensive line coach and coached there until 2001. In 2002, he was hired for the same position by the Denver Broncos. Burney worked as defensive line coach for the Washington Redskins from 2010 to 2014. The 2013 Redskins defensive line helped the team rank fourth in third-down conversion percentage (34.0) and tied for second in negative rushing plays by opponents (72). In 2014, his defensive line helped the Redskins rank 12th in the NFL in rushing yards allowed and the defense posted 36 sacks.

Burney was hired by the Cincinnati Bengals in 2016 to coach defensive line, rejoining Marvin Lewis from their Baltimore Ravens days, and replacing Jay Hayes who departed for the Tampa Bay Buccaneers.
