= Cody Core =

American football player (born 1994)

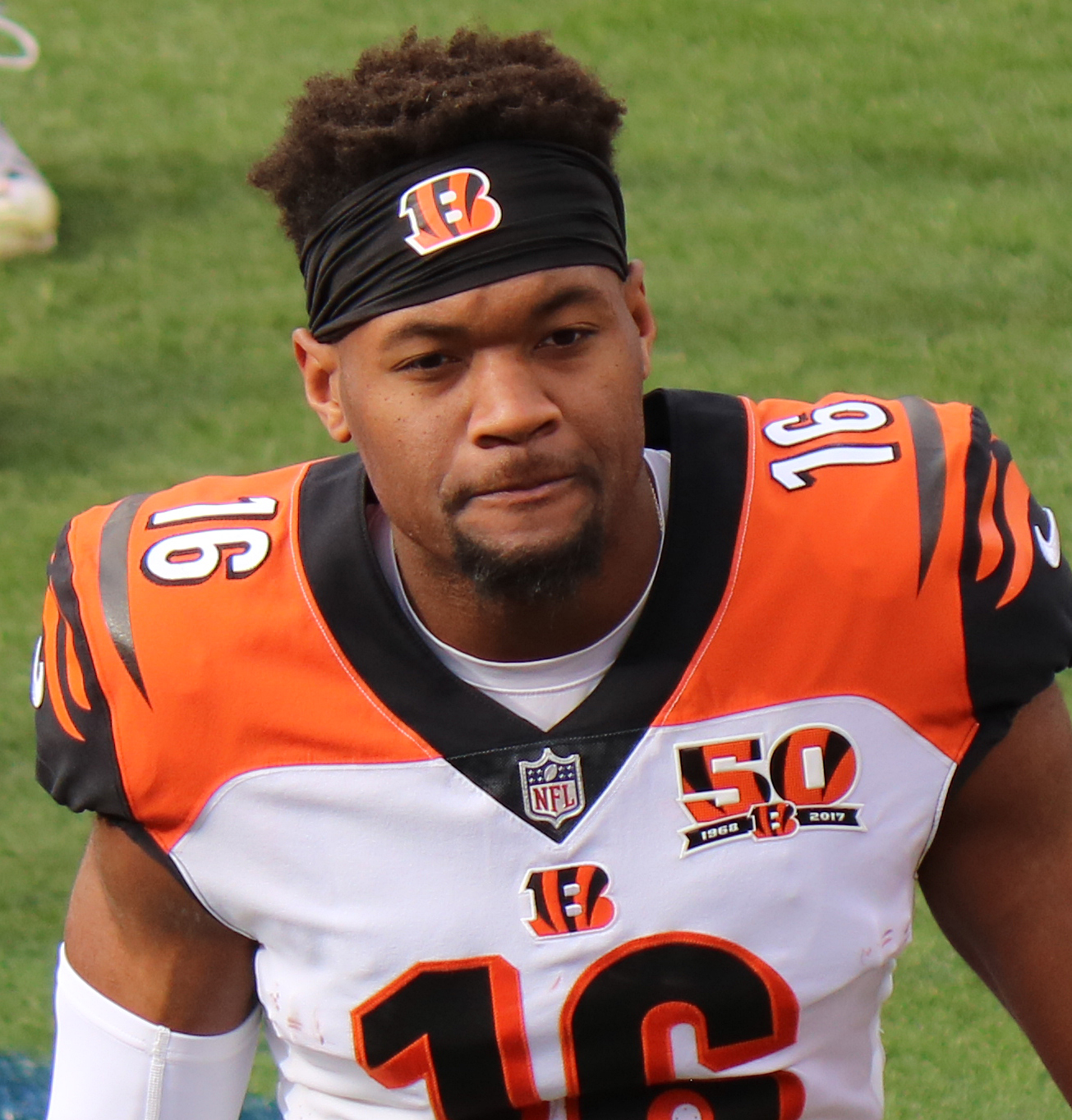
- Core with the Cincinnati Bengals in 2017

No. 16, 17
- Position: Wide receiver

Personal information
- Born: April 17, 1994 (age 32); Auburn, Alabama, U.S.
- Listed height: 6 ft 3 in (1.91 m)
- Listed weight: 205 lb (93 kg)

Career information
- High school: Auburn
- College: Ole Miss
- NFL draft: 2016: 6th round, 199th overall pick

Career history
- Cincinnati Bengals (2016–2018); New York Giants (2019–2020); Miami Dolphins (2021–2022)*
- * Offseason or practice squad member only

Career NFL statistics
- Games played: 51
- Receptions: 33
- Receiving yards: 388
- Receiving touchdowns: 1
- Stats at Pro Football Reference

Cody Dylan Core (born April 17, 1994) is an American former professional football player who was a wide receiver in the National Football League (NFL). He played college football for the Ole Miss Rebels and was selected by the Cincinnati Bengals in the sixth round of the 2016 NFL draft. He was also a member of the New York Giants and Miami Dolphins.

== Professional career ==
Pre-draft measurables
Height	Weight	Arm length	Hand span	40-yard dash	10-yard split	20-yard split	20-yard shuttle	Three-cone drill	Vertical jump	Broad jump	Bench press
6 ft 2 5/8 in (1.90 m)	205 lb (93 kg)	32 in (0.81 m)	10 3/8 in (0.26 m)	4.47 s	1.50 s	2.60 s	4.34 s	6.78 s	37.5 in (0.95 m)	9 ft 11 in (3.02 m)	14 reps
All values from NFL Combine/Pro Day

=== Cincinnati Bengals ===
Core was selected by the Cincinnati Bengals in the sixth round, 199th overall, of the 2016 NFL draft. In his rookie year, Core played in 8 games with 4 starts, recording 17 receptions for 200 yards.

Core was waived during final roster cuts on August 31, 2019.

=== New York Giants ===
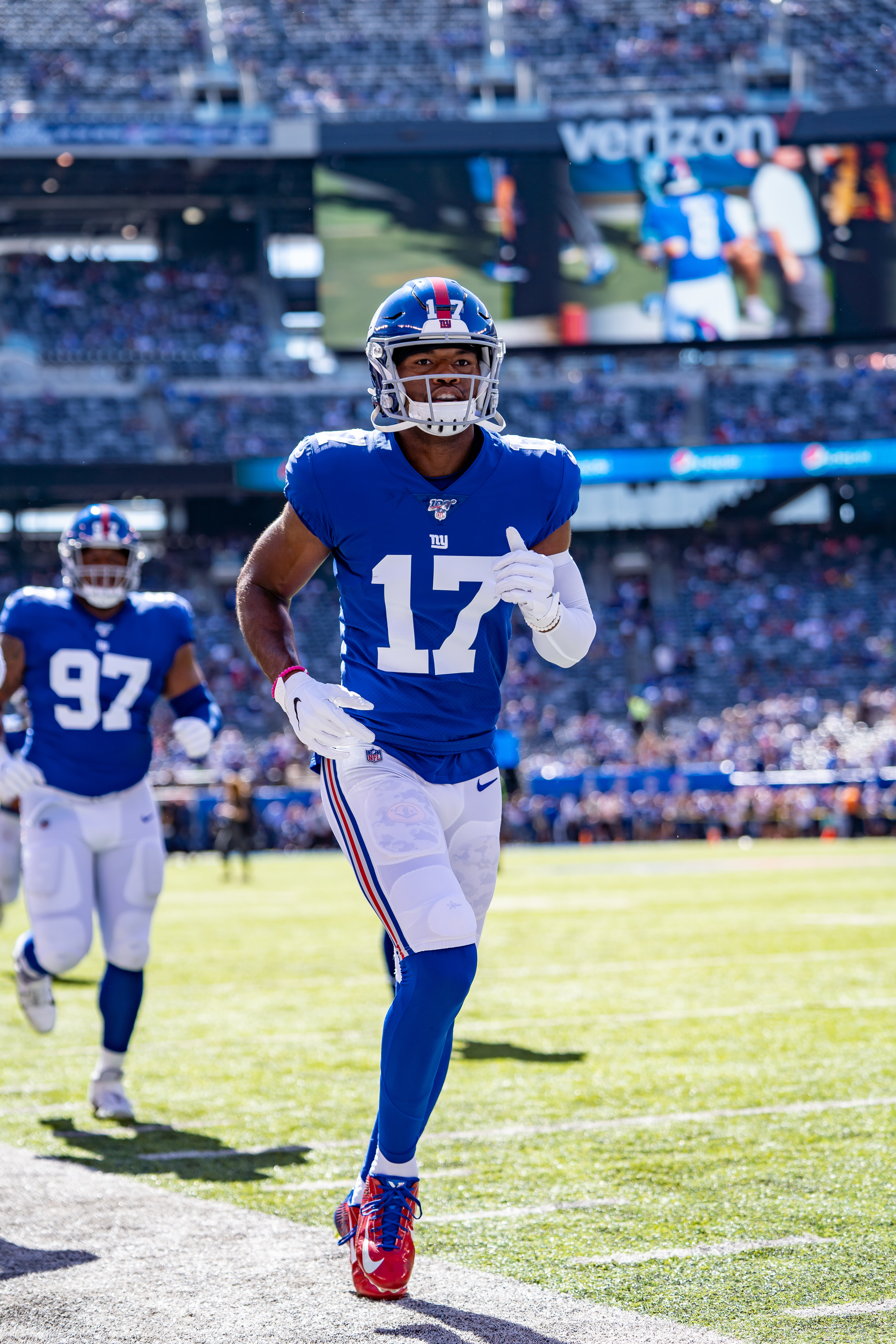
Core in a game against the Washington Redskins

On September 1, 2019, Core was claimed off waivers by the New York Giants.

On March 26, 2020, Core re-signed with the Giants. He was placed on injured reserve on August 19, 2020, after tearing his Achilles tendon in practice. He was released after the season on March 8, 2021.

=== Miami Dolphins ===
On November 29, 2021, Core was signed to the practice squad of the Miami Dolphins. He signed a reserve/future contract with the Dolphins on January 11, 2022. He was released with an NFI designation on July 26.
