= 2011 Cincinnati Bengals season =

NFL team season

- Owner: Mike Brown
- Head coach: Marvin Lewis
- Offensive coordinator: Jay Gruden
- Defensive coordinator: Mike Zimmer
- Home stadium: Paul Brown Stadium

Results
- Record: 9–7
- Division place: 3rd AFC North
- Playoffs: Lost Wild Card Playoffs (at Texans) 10–31
- All-Pros: DT Geno Atkins
- Pro Bowlers: 4: DT Geno Atkins; QB Andy Dalton; WR A. J. Green; TE Jermaine Gresham

Uniform
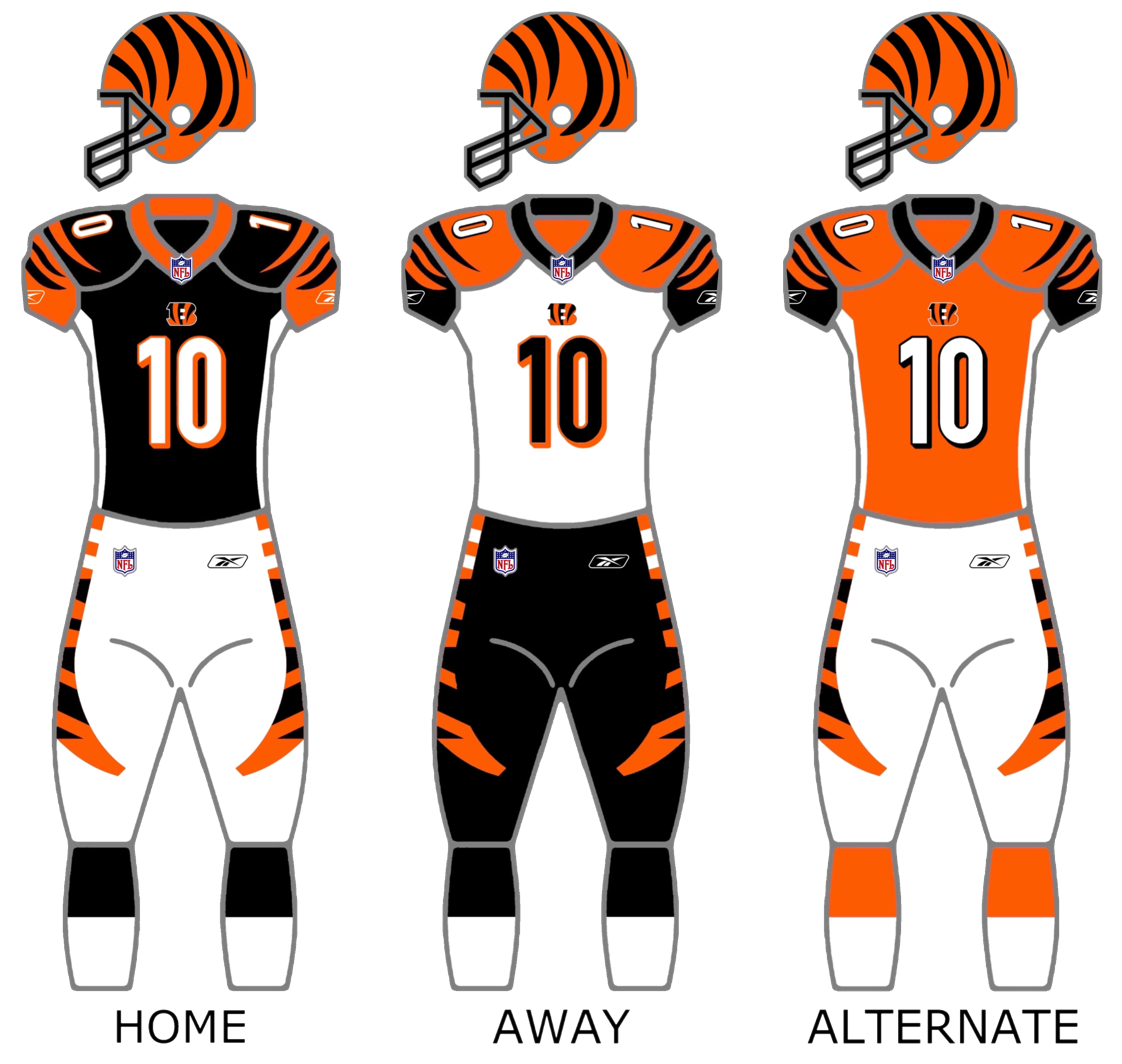

The 2011 season was the Cincinnati Bengals' 42nd in the National Football League (NFL) and their 44th overall. They entered the season coming off a 4–12 record in 2010. Head Coach Marvin Lewis was re-signed by the team. Quarterback Carson Palmer demanded a trade and was dealt to the Oakland Raiders. Wide receiver Chad Johnson was traded to the New England Patriots. Replacing the two, the organization drafted quarterback Andy Dalton and wide receiver A. J. Green in the 2011 NFL draft, who proceeded to make the Pro Bowl in their rookie seasons. The start of the 2011 season was hindered by a lockout, which cancelled the teams' mini-camp.

After going 1–3 in pre-season, the Bengals started their season off with a win against division rival Cleveland Browns, en route to a 9–7 record—their best outing since 2009. The franchise received a Wild Card spot in the 2011–12 NFL playoffs where it lost in the opening round to the Houston Texans. This would be paralleled the next year with another loss to Houston. 2011 marked Cincinnati's first of five consecutive playoff appearances through 2015. Four players—Dalton, Green, defensive lineman Geno Atkins, and tight end Jermaine Gresham—were elected to the 2012 Pro Bowl; Atkins was also selected to the Associated Press' 2011 All-Pro Team.

== Offseason ==
=== Signings ===
Pos.	Player	2010 Team	Contract
LB	Thomas Howard	Oakland Raiders	2 years, $6.5 million
RB	Cedric Benson	Cincinnati Bengals	1 year, $4.5 million
QB	Bruce Gradkowski	Oakland Raiders	2 years, $4 million
RB	Brian Leonard	Cincinnati Bengals	2 years, $2 million
S	Gibril Wilson	Cincinnati Bengals	1 year
G	Nate Livings	Cincinnati Bengals	1 year

=== Departures ===
Pos.	Player	2011 Team
DE	Antwan Odom	
WR	Chad Ochocinco	Patriots
LB	Dhani Jones	
G	Evan Mathis	Philadelphia Eagles
TE	Garrett Mills	New England Patriots
OT	Kirk Chambers	Detroit Lions
CB	Johnathan Joseph	Houston Texans
SS	Chinedum Ndukwe	Oakland Raiders
S	Roy Williams	retire
DT	Tank Johnson	
WR	Terrell Owens	

The Bengals finished their 2010 season with 4–12 record, their worst outing since 2002. In January 2011, the Bengals organization re-signed coach Marvin Lewis for another two years. Wide receivers Chad Johnson's and Terrell Owens's contracts expired, and the team did not re-sign them. Also, veteran quarterback Carson Palmer wanted to leave the Bengals via trade; he claimed if he could not be traded, he would retire. The Bengals organization decided to trade Palmer to the Oakland Raiders for a first-round draft pick in 2012 and a conditional draft pick in 2013 that is a second-rounder unless the Raiders win a playoff game, when it would become a first-rounder. Also The Bengals fired Offensive Coordinator Bob Bratkowski and replaced him with Jay Gruden

=== Lockout ===
Following the end of 2010 season, the collective bargaining agreement (CBA) between the owners of all 32 NFL teams and the players was set to expire on March 3, 2011. The two parties, however, decided to extend the CBA one more week in order to create a new CBA. A new CBA was not reached, and the owners locked out the players from team facilities and shut down league operations. The major issues disputed were the salary cap, players' safety and health benefits, revenue sharing and television contracts, transparency of financial information, rookie salaries, season length, and free agency guidelines. A new CBA could not be reached in time, and the annual Hall of Fame Game was cancelled. Also, teams could not hold official mini-camps because of the lockout. On July 25, 2011, NFL Commissioner Roger Goodell and NFLPA President DeMaurice Smith signed a new, 10-year CBA, and the lockout officially ended.

=== Draft ===
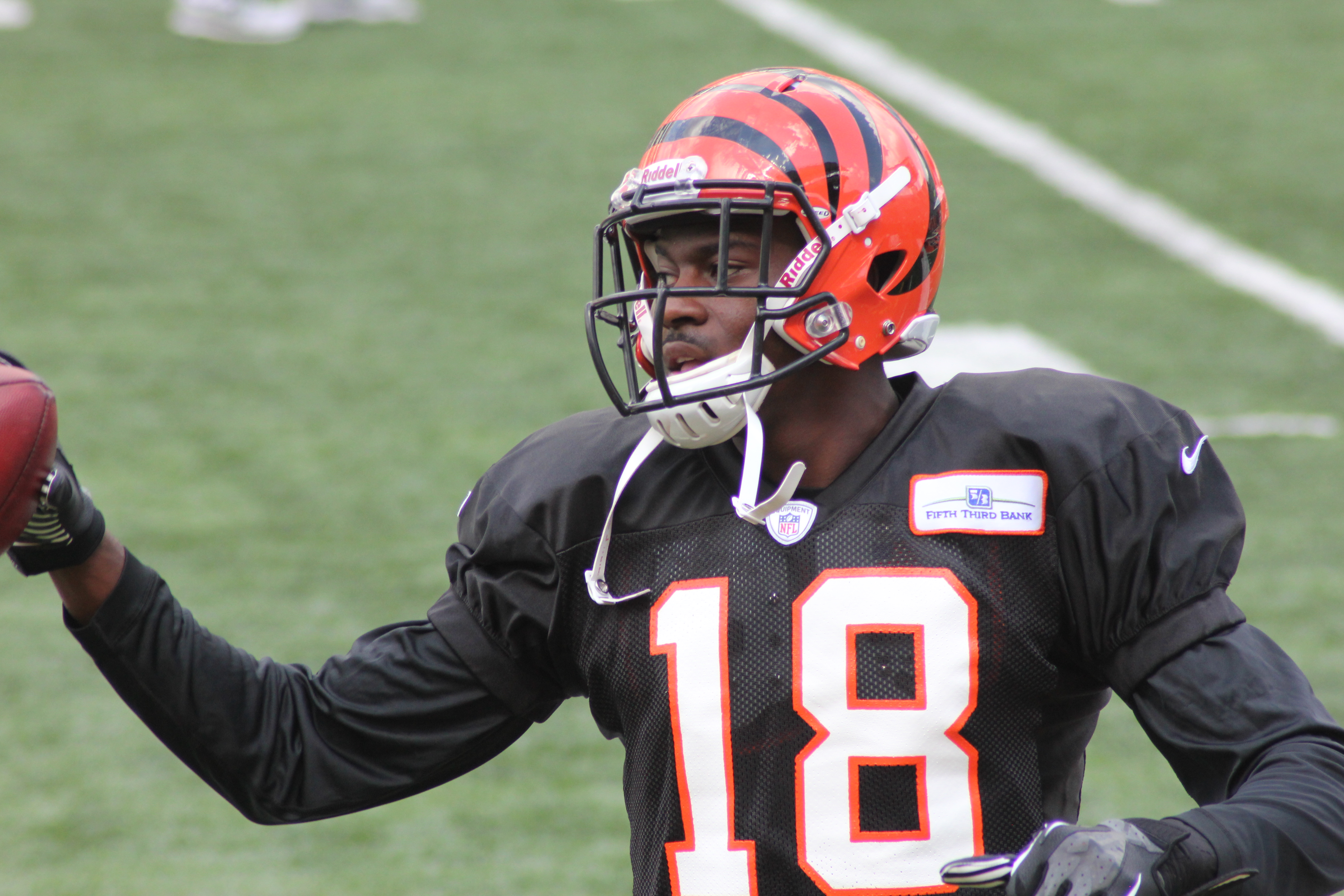
A. J. Green, the Bengals' first overall selection in the 2011 NFL draft

The 2011 NFL draft was held on April 28 to 30, 2011 at Radio City Music Hall. In the first round, the Bengals picked A. J. Green, a wide receiver from the University of Georgia, at overall selection number 4. In his last season at Georgia, Green missed the first four games, but he finished with a team-high 57 receptions for 848 receiving yards and 9 touchdowns. The Bengals selected TCU quarterback Andy Dalton in the second round, with overall selection number 35. These first two picks were replacements for starting wide receiver Chad Ochocinco and quarterback Carson Palmer, respectively. In the third round, the Bengals selected defensive lineman Dontay Moch of University of Nevada. During the NFL Scouting Combine, Moch ran a 4.44 40-yard dash, making him the fastest defensive lineman to ever run the dash. The Bengals' next pick was another player from Georgia University; it selected offensive lineman Clint Boling in the fourth round. Boling was a 3-time All-SEC pick and, during his college tenure, was a versatile lineman who can play tackle or guard. In the fifth round, free safety Robert Sands was chosen with the 134 pick. The Bengals' picked wide receiver Ryan Whalen of Stanford University in the sixth round. The final two picks for the Bengals were cornerback Korey Lindsey of Southern Illinois University and running back Jay Finley of Baylor University. In July, the Bengals signed five draft picks to contracts.

2011 Cincinnati Bengals draft
Round	Pick	Player	Position	College	Notes
1	4	A. J. Green *	Wide receiver	Georgia	
2	35	Andy Dalton *	Quarterback	TCU	
3	66	Dontay Moch	Linebacker	Nevada	
4	101	Clint Boling	Guard	Georgia	
5	134	Robert Sands	Safety	West Virginia	
6	167	Ryan Whalen	Wide receiver	Stanford	
7	207	Korey Lindsey	Cornerback	Southern Illinois	
7	246	Jay Finley	Running back	Baylor	
Made roster * Made at least one Pro Bowl during career

=== Undrafted free agents ===
Name	Position	College
Colin Cochart	Tight end	South Dakota State
Landon Cox	Wide receiver	Northern Illinois
DeQuin Evans	Linebacker	Kentucky
Stephen Franklin	Linebacker	Southern Illinois
John Griffin	Running back	UMass
Andrew Hawkins	Wide receiver	Toledo
Jamere Holland	Wide receiver	Lindenwood
Bart Johnson	Wide receiver	TCU
Lolomana Mikaele	Defensive tackle	Arizona
Matthew O’Donnell	Tackle	Queen's
Chris Riley	Guard	Illinois State
Thomas Weber	Kicker	Arizona State
Jonathan Williams	Running back	East Carolina

== Staff ==
2011 Cincinnati Bengals staff
Front office: Owner/president/general manager – Mike Brown; Executive vice president – Katie Blackburn; Senior vice president of player personnel – Pete Brown; Vice president of player personnel – Paul H. Brown; Director of football operations – Jim Lippincott; Director of player personnel – Duke Tobin; Head coaches: Head coach – Marvin Lewis; Assistant head coach/offensive line – Paul Alexander; Offensive coaches: Offensive coordinator – Jay Gruden; Quarterbacks – Ken Zampese; Running backs – Jim Anderson; Wide receivers – James Urban; Tight ends – Jonathan Hayes; Offensive quality control – Kyle Caskey	Defensive coaches: Defensive coordinator – Mike Zimmer; Defensive line – Jay Hayes; Linebackers – Jeff FitzGerald; Defensive backs – Kevin Coyle; Defensive quality control – David Lippincott; Special teams coaches: Special teams – Darrin Simmons; Assistant special teams/assistant defensive backs – Paul Guenther; Strength and conditioning: Strength and conditioning – Chip Morton; Assistant strength and conditioning – Jeff Friday; Coaching assistants: Brayden Coombs

== Final roster ==
2011 Cincinnati Bengals roster
Quarterbacks (QB): 14 Andy Dalton; 7 Bruce Gradkowski; Running backs (RB): 32 Cedric Benson; 40 Brian Leonard; 30 Cedric Peerman; 36 Chris Pressley FB; 28 Bernard Scott; Wide receivers (WR): 85 Armon Binns; 18 A. J. Green; 16 Andrew Hawkins; 89 Jerome Simpson; 19 Brandon Tate RS; 88 Ryan Whalen; Tight ends (TE): 81 Colin Cochart; 84 Jermaine Gresham; 86 Donald Lee	Offensive linemen (OL): 65 Clint Boling G; 73 Anthony Collins T; 64 Kyle Cook C; 60 Otis Hudson G; 62 Nate Livings G; 66 Mike McGlynn G; 74 Dennis Roland T; 71 Andre Smith T; 77 Andrew Whitworth T; Defensive linemen (DL): 97 Geno Atkins DT; 96 Carlos Dunlap DE; 68 Jonathan Fanene DE; 91 Robert Geathers DE; 98 Nick Hayden DT; 93 Michael Johnson DE; 94 Domata Peko DT; 92 Frostee Rucker DE	Linebackers (LB): 53 Thomas Howard OLB; 59 Brandon Johnson OLB; 99 Manny Lawson OLB; 58 Rey Maualuga MLB; 52 Dontay Moch OLB; 57 Vincent Rey OLB; 51 Dan Skuta MLB; Defensive backs (DB): 22 Nate Clements CB; 42 Chris Crocker SS; 21 Brandon Ghee CB; 23 Kelly Jennings CB; 24 Adam Jones CB; 26 Taylor Mays FS; 45 Jeromy Miles SS; 20 Reggie Nelson FS; 31 Robert Sands FS; 27 Gibril Wilson S; Special teams (ST): 46 Clark Harris LS; 10 Kevin Huber P; 2 Mike Nugent K	Practice squad: 37 John Bowie CB (IR); 80 Chase Coffman TE; 35 James Develin FB; 41 DeQuin Evans LB (IR); 17 Vidal Hazelton WR; 50 Micah Johnson LB; 95 Swanson Miller DT; 25 Devon Torrence CB; 76 Matt O'Donnell T; 5 Zac Robinson QB; Reserve: 87 Andre Caldwell WR (IR); 29 Leon Hall CB (IR); 56 Roddrick Muckelroy MLB (IR); 55 Keith Rivers OLB (NF-Inj.); 83 Bo Scaife TE (IR); 11 Jordan Shipley WR (IR); 90 Pat Sims DT (IR); 63 Bobbie Williams G (IR); Rookies in italics 53 active, 10 reserve, 8 practice squad

=== Training camp ===
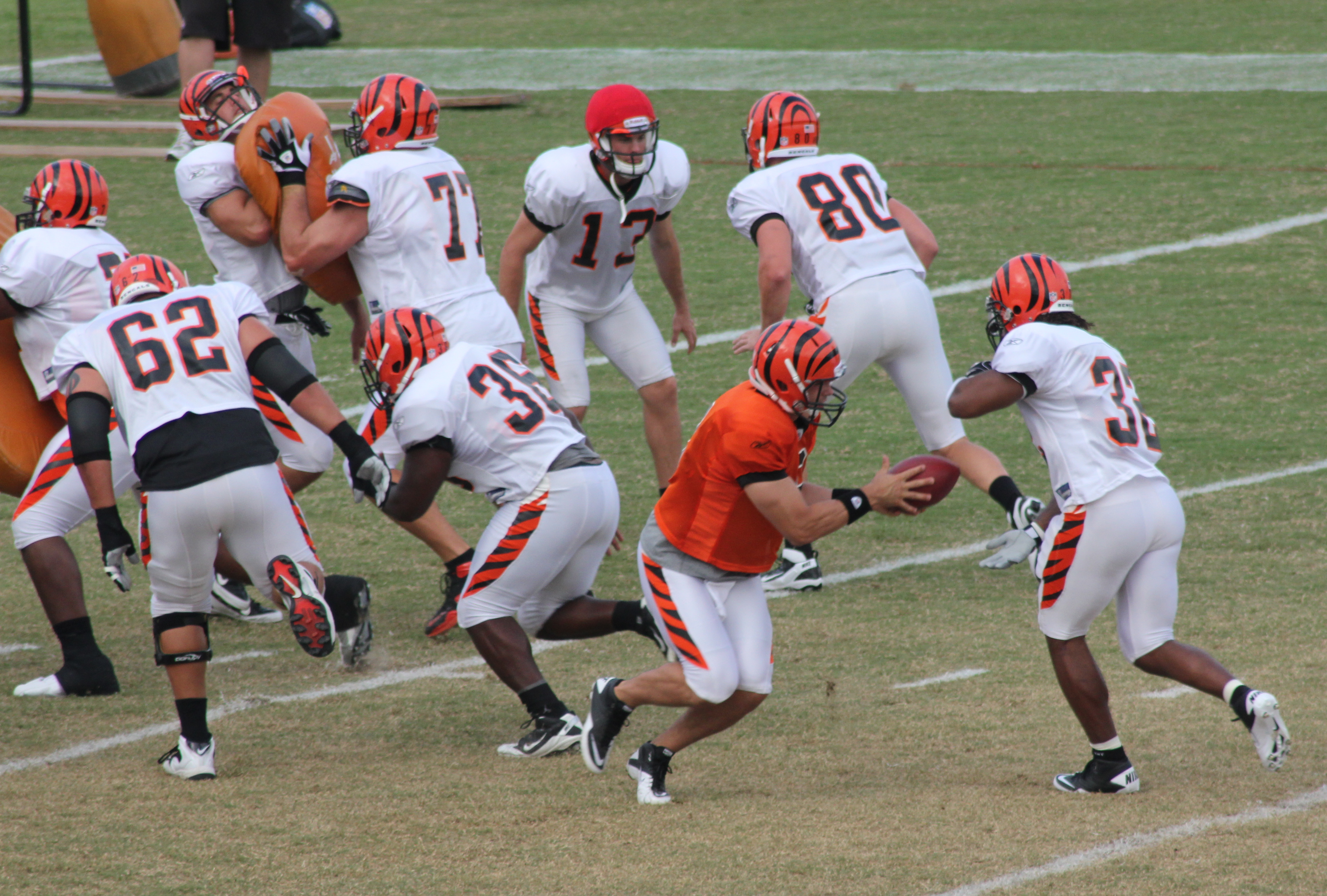
Andy Dalton during training camp

Training camp was held at Georgetown College, in Georgetown, Kentucky, for the 15th straight year. Players reported on July 28, the first practice was July 30, and camp ended on August 7. On July 28, the Bengals traded Ochocinco to the New England Patriots for a late draft pick in 2012 and another late pick in 2013. A few days later, running back Cedric Benson, who was arrested prior, signed a new, one-year contract with the team. Other notable roster changes during training camp include cutting defensive end Antwan Odom because of his injury, and cornerback Johnathan Joseph was picked up from free agency by the Houston Texans.

The San Diego Union Tribune claimed Green was the best player of the entire training camp. The Bengals wanted cornerback Adam Jones to participate to hopefully become the starter; however, he did not participate in camp due to a neck injury. On the first day of practice, linebacker Roddrick Muckelro ruptured his Achilles' tendon, which caused him to miss the entire season. Dalton played well enough in training camp for Marvin Lewis to nominate him to be the starter for the opening pre-season game. Former Bengals quarterback Boomer Esiason criticized this move claiming, "If they force-feed [Dalton] and put him in games right away, he will get killed. He will get eaten alive."

== Preseason ==
Cincinnati opened their pre-season schedule with a 34–3 loss to the Detroit Lions. The first offensive play for the Bengals resulted in a sack from DL Ndamukong Suh, and the pass was intercepted by CB Chris Houston. The only score for the Bengals was a field goal from kicker Mike Nugent. For its second game, the Bengals traveled to New Jersey to play the New York Jets. The final score of the game was a 27–7 defeat. The Bengals' offense was not productive, and Dalton claimed, "I have to come out and play better." In pre-season week 3, the Bengals played their first home game of the season, and won 24–13 against the Carolina Panthers. The Bengals' final game was another home game, playing against the Indianapolis Colts. The starters did not play much, and the team ended up losing 17–14. On September 3, 2011, the Bengals' organization released 27 roster spots, in order to make room for the limit of 53 players. It also acquired WR Brandon Tate, OL Mike McGlynn, and TE Mickey Shuler from waivers.

Week	Date	Opponent	Result	Record	Venue	Recap
1	August 12	at Detroit Lions	L 3–34	0–1	Ford Field	Recap
2	August 21	at New York Jets	L 7–27	0–2	New Meadowlands Stadium	Recap
3	August 25	Carolina Panthers	W 24–13	1–2	Paul Brown Stadium	Recap
4	September 1	Indianapolis Colts	L 13–17	1–3	Paul Brown Stadium	Recap

== Regular season ==
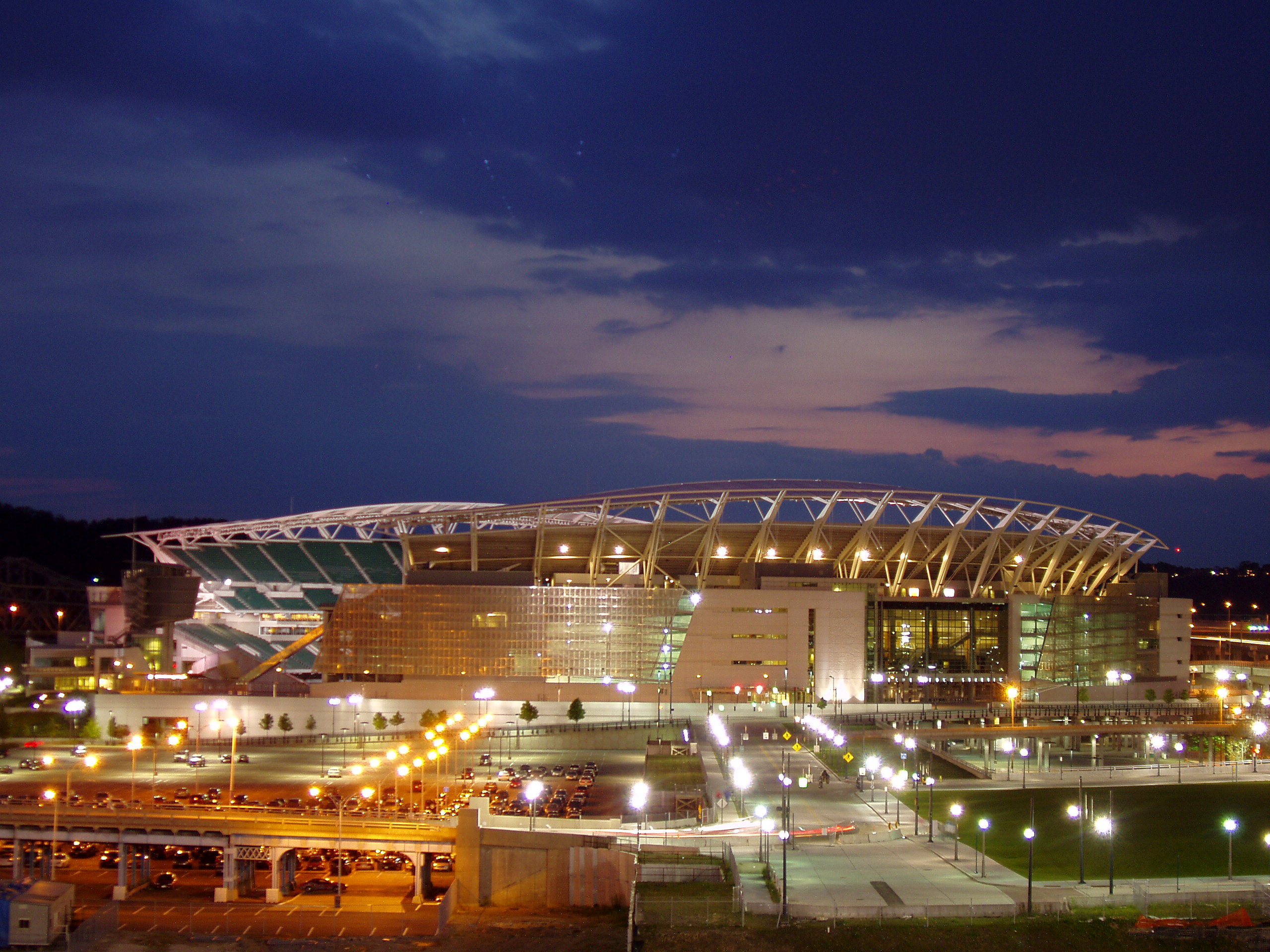
Paul Brown Stadium, the home stadium for the Bengals

Based on 2010 standings, the Bengals had an easy schedule, with an opponent winning percentage of .473; 5 teams were played against that finished 2011 with winning records, and 8 teams were played against that finished 2011 with losing records. The Bengals played each of the teams in the AFC North twice, once home and once on the road. It played its home games at Paul Brown Stadium. Cincinnati's match-ups included the Seattle Seahawks and the Colts, both of which won its respective divisions in 2010. Because of the Bengals' losing record in 2010, the NFL decided to not give Cincinnati any prime-time games.

Six of the Bengals' eight home games were blacked out locally due to poor ticket sales. Dating back to 2010, seven consecutive games were blacked out locally. That streak ended in week 10 when the Bengals hosted the Pittsburgh Steelers. There were three more blackouts before the Bengals sold out the final home game of the season against the Baltimore Ravens, a game with playoff implications for both teams. The Bengals' average home crowd of 49,251 was the worst of the entire NFL.

Green was one of four players from the Bengals to be nominated to the 2012 Pro Bowl, who became the first rookie wide receiver to accomplish this feat since 2003. The other three players were Dalton, Atkins, and Gresham. Andrew Whitworth was the only player to make the Associated Press' All-Pro team. In week 10, Dalton threw his thirteenth and fourteenth touchdown pass, making him the most passing touchdowns by a rookie in his team's first nine games since the AFL–NFL merger (1970). He also placed second in the Associated Press' Offensive Player of the Year award.

=== Schedule ===
Week	Date	Opponent	Result	Record	Venue	Recap
1	September 11	at **Cleveland Browns**	**W** 27–17	1–0	Cleveland Browns Stadium	Recap
2	September 18	at Denver Broncos	**L** 22–24	1–1	Sports Authority Field at Mile High	Recap
3	September 25	San Francisco 49ers	**L** 8–13	1–2	Paul Brown Stadium	Recap
4	October 2	Buffalo Bills	**W** 23–20	2–2	Paul Brown Stadium	Recap
5	October 9	at Jacksonville Jaguars	**W** 30–20	3–2	EverBank Field	Recap
6	October 16	Indianapolis Colts	**W** 27–17	4–2	Paul Brown Stadium	Recap
7	Bye					
8	October 30	at Seattle Seahawks	**W** 34–12	5–2	CenturyLink Field	Recap
9	November 6	at Tennessee Titans	**W** 24–17	6–2	LP Field	Recap
10	November 13	**Pittsburgh Steelers**	**L** 17–24	6–3	Paul Brown Stadium	Recap
11	November 20	at **Baltimore Ravens**	**L** 24–31	6–4	M&T Bank Stadium	Recap
12	November 27	**Cleveland Browns**	**W** 23–20	7–4	Paul Brown Stadium	Recap
13	December 4	at **Pittsburgh Steelers**	**L** 7–35	7–5	Heinz Field	Recap
14	December 11	Houston Texans	**L** 19–20	7–6	Paul Brown Stadium	Recap
15	December 18	at St. Louis Rams	**W** 20–13	8–6	Edward Jones Dome	Recap
16	December 24	Arizona Cardinals	**W** 23–16	9–6	Paul Brown Stadium	Recap
17	January 1	**Baltimore Ravens**	**L** 16–24	9–7	Paul Brown Stadium	Recap

Note: Intra-division opponents are in bold text.

=== Standings ===
The 2011 season was the Bengals' tenth season as members of the AFC North Division. In 2010, the Bengals finished fourth—and last—place in the standings. Entering the 2011 season, sportswriter Andy Benoit of The New York Times and five analysts for ESPN predicted the team to finish last. The Bengals finished the regular season with a 9–7 record, which was good enough for the team to win a Wild Card spot in the playoffs. The Cleveland Browns was the only team from the division to not make the playoffs; the Baltimore Ravens won the division, and the Pittsburgh Steelers earned the second Wild Card spot.

AFC North
	W	L	T	PCT	DIV	CONF	PF	PA	STK
^{(2)} Baltimore Ravens	12	4	0	.750	6–0	9–3	378	266	W2
^{(5)} Pittsburgh Steelers	12	4	0	.750	4–2	9–3	325	227	W2
^{(6)} Cincinnati Bengals	9	7	0	.563	2–4	6–6	344	323	L1
Cleveland Browns	4	12	0	.250	0–6	3–9	218	307	L6

=== Week 1: at Cleveland Browns ===
	1	2	3	4	Total
**Bengals**	10	3	0	14	**27**
Browns	0	14	3	0	**17**

September 11, 2011 at Cleveland Browns Stadium, Cleveland, Ohio

The Bengals started their regular season against the Cleveland Browns, in front of 67,321 spectators at Cleveland Browns Stadium in Cleveland, Ohio. On the Bengals' opening drive, the team drove 53-yards and got a field goal. The Bengals' next two drives were a touchdown and another field goal, respectively. Cleveland scored two touchdowns in the second quarter to be up 14–13 going into halftime. On the Bengals' final offensive play before halftime, Dalton was sacked and injured; he did not play the rest of the game. The Bengals were the first to get the ball in the third quarter, but it did not score the entire quarter. On the other hand, the Browns kicked a field goal in the third to go up by four points. In the final quarter, the Bengals scored two touchdowns, including the longest play of the game: a 44-yard reception to Green. With the win, the Bengals began the season 1–0 and secured their first regular season opening day win since 2007. Also, Dalton became the fifth quarterback to win his road debut as a rookie.

=== Week 2: at Denver Broncos ===
	1	2	3	4	Total
Bengals	0	3	12	7	**22**
**Broncos**	7	3	7	7	**24**

September 18, 2011 at Sports Authority Field at Mile High, Denver, Colorado

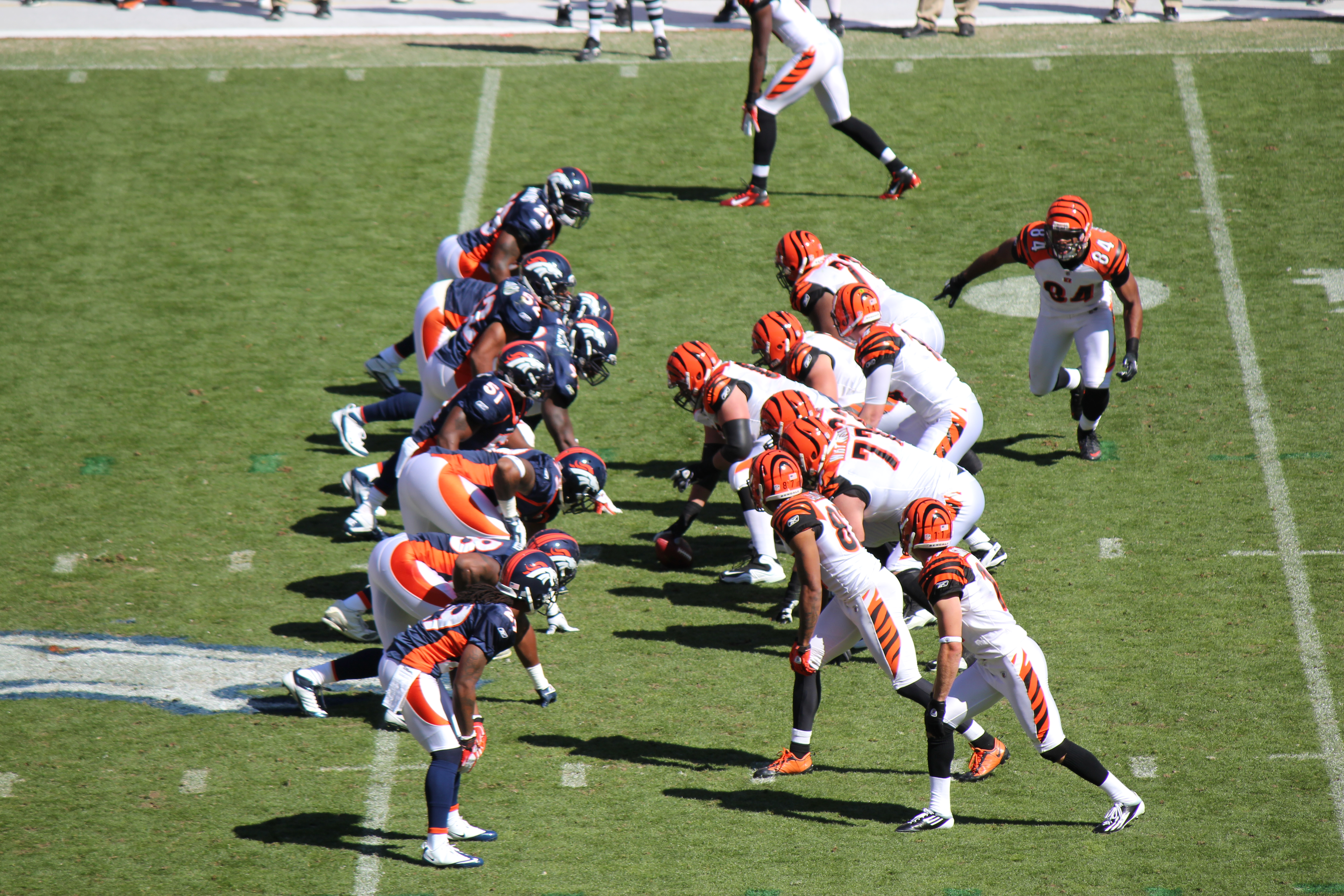
The Bengals against the Broncos

The Bengals came into the game losing the previous two games against the Denver Broncos. The Bengals have not won at Denver since 1975. Dalton started the game, despite missing practices and not being cleared until Friday because of his wrist injury. Paid attendance of 73,281 was the highest number of any games the Bengals played in 2011. The first score of the game happened in the first quarter when RB Willis McGahee ran one yard for a touchdown. Both teams scored a field goal in the second quarter to make the game 10–3 going into halftime.

Denver QB Kyle Orton threw two touchdown passes to WR Eric Decker—one in the third quarter and one in the fourth quarter. With two minutes left in the game, the Bengals were down 24–22 and tried to score to win the game. The Bengals reached midfield, but the Broncos' defense stopped the Bengals and a fourth-and-nineteen occurred. Dalton threw the ball away, and a turnover on downs happened. Dalton's passer rating of 107.0 was a franchise best by a rookie, and WR Jerome Simpson had a career-high 136 receiving yards. WR Jordan Shipley torn his anterior cruciate ligament this game, which ended his 2011 season.

=== Week 3: vs. San Francisco 49ers ===
	1	2	3	4	Total
**49ers**	0	0	3	10	**13**
Bengals	3	0	0	5	**8**

September 25, 2011 at Paul Brown Stadium, Cincinnati, Ohio (Blacked Out)

Playing versus the San Francisco 49ers at home for the first time since 2003, the Bengals lost 13–8 with the smallest crowd for a Bengals home opener since 1981. Before the game, the team activated Simpson, who was previously injured. The only score in the first half was when Nugent kicked a 22-yard field goal in the first quarter. It took until 3 minutes left in the third quarter for another score, when 49ers' kicker David Akers tied the game with a field goal. The Bengals' final possession ended when 49ers' Reggie Smith intercepted Dalton's pass with 1:45 left in the game. It was Dalton's first performance where his passer rating was below 100; this game he completed 17 of 32 passes for 157 yards and a rating of 40.8. Coach Lewis claimed the lack of third-down conversions (1–10) were the main reason why the team lost, saying that "We are not converting the third downs or converting in the red zone, and we are not coming away with touchdowns. Right now, that is our biggest deficiency."

=== Week 4: vs. Buffalo Bills ===
	1	2	3	4	Total
Bills	0	17	0	3	**20**
**Bengals**	3	0	10	10	**23**

October 2, 2011 at Paul Brown Stadium, Cincinnati, Ohio (Blacked Out)

After two losses, the Bengals played the Buffalo Bills at home with 41,142 people in attendance. Simpson was able to play this game, despite being under investigation for marijuana. Prior to this game, the Bengals lost 10-straight games to the Bills, dating back to the 1988 AFC championship game. After two possessions resulting in punts, the Bengals got a field goal in the first quarter. In the second quarter, the Bills scored three times. Kicker Rian Lindell kicked a 43-yard field goal. In the next Bengals possession, Dalton threw an interception, which was returned for a touchdown. The Bills' running back Fred Jackson scored a 2-yard rushing touchdown for the team to be up 17–3 going into half time. Nugent kicked a field goal, and Gresham caught a touchdown pass in the third quarter to make the score 13–17 going into the final quarter. Lindell kicked a field goal on the Bills' opening drive to make the score 20–13. Dalton had a three-yard rushing touchdown two possessions later to tie the game at 20–20. On the Bengals' final possession of the game, on third-down-and-three-yards-to-go, Dalton scrambled and attempted to make the first down. He was originally called short the referee, but the call was reversed once the play was reviewed. Nugent kicked a game-winning field goal as time expired to beat the Bills 23–20. The win by the Bengals snapped a 10-game losing streak to the Bills. The Bengals had not beaten the Bills since the 1989 AFC Championship Game.

=== Week 5: at Jacksonville Jaguars ===
With the win, the Bengals went to 3–2 and snapped a seven-game road losing streak against the Jaguars, winning in Jacksonville for the first time since the 1995 season.

=== Week 6: vs. Indianapolis Colts ===
(Blacked Out)

With the win, the Bengals went to 4–2. They also defeated the Colts for the first time since 1997, snapping their 7-game losing streak against them.

=== Week 8: at Seattle Seahawks ===
	1	2	3	4	Total
**Bengals**	10	7	0	17	**34**
Seahawks	0	3	3	6	**12**

October 30, 2011 at CenturyLink Field, Seattle, Washington

The Bengals took a 10–0 lead in the first quarter thanks to a Mike Nugent 34-yard field goal and a 14-yard touchdown pass from Andy Dalton to Jerome Simpson. The Seahawks tallied 411 total yards, mostly through the air, behind backup quarterback Tarvaris Jackson, but were kept out of the end zone until midway through the fourth quarter. After a 48-yard field goal by Mike Nugent with 4:50 left in the game gave the Bengals a 20–12 lead, the Bengals sealed the victory with a Brandon Tate 56-yard punt return for a touchdown, and a Reggie Nelson 75-yard interception return for a touchdown.

=== Week 9: at Tennessee Titans ===
With the win, the Bengals improved to 6-2 and captured their first 5-game winning streak since 1988.

=== Week 10: vs. Pittsburgh Steelers ===
With the loss, the Bengals fell to 6–3, and had their 5-game winning streak snapped.

=== Week 11: at Baltimore Ravens ===
With the loss, the Bengals fell to 6–4.

=== Week 12: vs. Cleveland Browns ===
With the win, the Bengals improved to 7–4.

=== Week 13: at Pittsburgh Steelers ===
With the loss, the Bengals fell to 7–5.

=== Week 14: vs. Houston Texans ===
With the loss, the Bengals fell to 7–6, and are now in danger of falling out of the wild card hunt.

=== Week 15: at St. Louis Rams ===
With the win, the Bengals went to 8–6, and are still in the Wild Card hunt.

=== Week 16: vs. Arizona Cardinals ===
	1	2	3	4	Total
Cardinals	0	0	0	16	**16**
**Bengals**	10	10	3	0	**23**

December 24, 2011 at Paul Brown Stadium, Cincinnati, Ohio

The Bengals took a 20–0 halftime lead on the strength of Andy Dalton touchdown passes to Jermaine Gresham and Jerome Simpson, as well as two Mike Nugent field goals. The Cardinals finally mounted a comeback rally in the fourth quarter, but it fell short. This was the game when Jerome Simpson did a complete flip over Daryl Washington and landed on his feet for a touchdown. The Bengals improved to 9–6.

=== Week 17: vs. Baltimore Ravens ===
	1	2	3	4	Total
**Ravens**	10	7	0	7	**24**
Bengals	3	0	7	6	**16**

January 1, 2012 at Paul Brown Stadium, Cincinnati, Ohio

In their final regular season game of the year, the Bengals played against the Ravens for a second time. Since the game had playoff implications for both teams, the game time was moved from 1:00 pm EST to 4:15 pm EST. It was the second sell-out game for the Bengals all season. The first score of the game came in the first quarter when Ravens running back Ray Rice ran for a 70-yard touchdown. Nugent made three field goals this game, which gave him a team-record of 33 for the season. The team was down by 8 with 1:05 left in the game on their own 20-yard line. The game ended in a 24–16 loss when Dalton threw a pass out of the end zone as time expired. Despite the loss, the Bengals still gained a playoff spot because the Oakland Raiders and New York Jets lost, which allowed the Bengals to have the final Wild Card spot—their third appearance in the past 20 years.

== Postseason ==
Their 9–7 regular season record gave the Bengals the second Wild Card spot in the AFC. Their record was tied with the Tennessee Titans, but it won the tie breaker because it had a better head-to-head win percentage. The Bengals were looking to get their first playoff win since 1990. This did not occur, as the team lost to the Houston Texans on January 7, 2012.

Round	Date	Opponent (seed)	Result	Record	Venue	Recap
Wild Card	January 7, 2012	at Houston Texans	L 10–31	0–1	Reliant Stadium	Recap
