= 2012 Cincinnati Bengals season =

NFL team season

- Owner: Mike Brown
- Head coach: Marvin Lewis
- Offensive coordinator: Jay Gruden
- Defensive coordinator: Mike Zimmer
- Home stadium: Paul Brown Stadium

Results
- Record: 10–6
- Division place: 2nd AFC North
- Playoffs: Lost Wild Card Playoffs (at Texans) 13–19
- Pro Bowlers: 4

Uniform
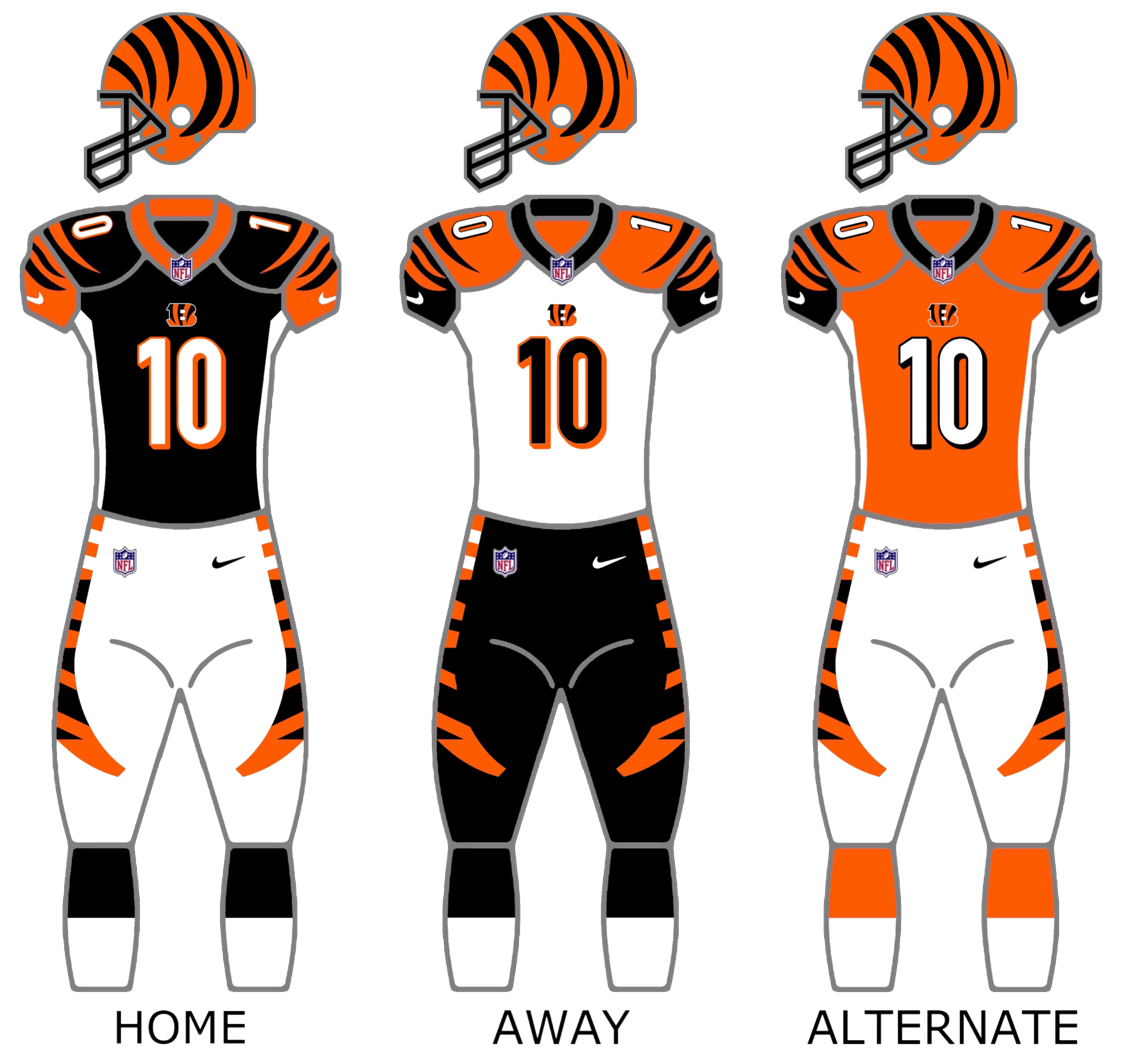

The 2012 season was the Cincinnati Bengals' 43rd in the National Football League (NFL), their 45th overall, their 22nd under the leadership of owner and team president Mike Brown and their 10th under head coach Marvin Lewis. The team improved on their 2011 season, finishing tied with the Baltimore Ravens for the AFC North division title, but lost the tiebreaker to the Ravens. The Bengals, however, made the playoffs as a wild card team, finishing as the 6th seed in the AFC playoffs, but lost to the Houston Texans for a second consecutive season.

2012 was the first non-strike season in Bengals history in which they made it to the NFL playoffs for a second consecutive year.

== Draft ==
2012 Cincinnati Bengals draft
Round	Pick	Player	Position	College	Notes
1	17	Dre Kirkpatrick	CB	Alabama	Pick from OAK^{[a]}
1	27	Kevin Zeitler	G	Wisconsin	Pick from NO^{[b]}
2	53	Devon Still	DT	Penn State	
3	83	Mohamed Sanu	WR	Rutgers	
3	93	Brandon Thompson	DT	Clemson	
4	116	Orson Charles	TE	Georgia	
4	156	Shaun Prater	CB	Iowa	
5	166	Marvin Jones	WR	California	Pick from NE^{[c]}
5	167	George Iloka	S	Boise State	Pick from NYG^{[d]}
6	191	Dan Herron	RB	Ohio State	
Made roster † Pro Football Hall of Fame * Made at least one Pro Bowl during career

Notes

^{^[a]} The team acquired this first-round selection and a conditional 2013 second-round selection in trade that sent quarterback Carson Palmer to the Oakland Raiders.
^{^[b]} From Saints through the Patriots.
^{^[c]} The team acquired this fifth-round selection and a 2013 sixth-round selection in a trade that sent wide receiver Chad Ochocinco to the New England Patriots.
^{^[d]} The team acquired this fifth-round selection in a trade that sent linebacker Keith Rivers to the New York Giants.

The team also traded its seventh-round selection (#228 overall) and cornerback David Jones to the Jacksonville Jaguars in exchange for safety Reggie Nelson.

== Staff ==
2012 Cincinnati Bengals staff
Front office: President – Mike Brown; Senior vice president of player personnel – Pete Brown; Executive vice president – Katie Blackburn; Vice president of player personnel – Paul H. Brown; Director of player personnel – Duke Tobin; Head coaches: Head coach – Marvin Lewis; Assistant head coach/offensive line – Paul Alexander; Offensive coaches: Offensive coordinator – Jay Gruden; Quarterbacks – Ken Zampese; Running backs – Jim Anderson; Wide receivers – James Urban; Tight ends – Jonathan Hayes; Offensive assistant – Brayden Coombs; Offensive quality control/assistant offensive line – Kyle Caskey	Defensive coaches: Defensive coordinator – Mike Zimmer; Defensive line – Jay Hayes; Linebackers – Paul Guenther; Defensive backs – Mark Carrier; Defensive quality control/assistant linebackers – David Lippincott; Special teams coaches: Special teams – Darrin Simmons; Assistant special teams/assistant defensive backs – Hue Jackson; Strength and conditioning: Strength and conditioning – Chip Morton; Assistant strength and conditioning – Jeff Friday

== Final roster ==
2012 Cincinnati Bengals roster
Quarterbacks (QB): 14 Andy Dalton; 7 Bruce Gradkowski; Running backs (RB): 35 John Conner FB; 42 BenJarvus Green-Ellis; 34 Dan Herron; 40 Brian Leonard; 30 Cedric Peerman; Wide receivers (WR): 18 A. J. Green; 16 Andrew Hawkins; 82 Marvin Jones; 11 Dane Sanzenbacher; 19 Brandon Tate; 88 Ryan Whalen; Tight ends (TE): 80 Orson Charles; 84 Jermaine Gresham; 89 Richard Quinn	Offensive linemen (OL): 65 Clint Boling G; 73 Anthony Collins T/G; 64 Kyle Cook C; 66 Trevor Robinson C/G; 74 Dennis Roland T; 71 Andre Smith T; 77 Andrew Whitworth T; 68 Kevin Zeitler G; Defensive linemen (DL): 97 Geno Atkins DT; 96 Carlos Dunlap DE; 91 Robert Geathers DE; 95 Wallace Gilberry DE; 93 Michael Johnson DE; 94 Domata Peko DT; 90 Pat Sims DT; 75 Devon Still DT; 79 Brandon Thompson DT	Linebackers (LB): 55 Vontaze Burfict OLB; 59 Emmanuel Lamur OLB; 99 Manny Lawson OLB; 58 Rey Maualuga MLB; 57 Vincent Rey OLB; 51 Dan Skuta MLB; Defensive backs (DB): 25 Jason Allen CB; 22 Nate Clements; 33 Chris Crocker SS; 29 Leon Hall CB; 43 George Iloka FS; 24 Adam Jones CB; 37 Chris Lewis-Harris CB; 26 Taylor Mays S; 45 Jeromy Miles SS; 20 Reggie Nelson FS; 23 Terence Newman CB; Special teams (ST): 3 Josh Brown K; 46 Clark Harris LS; 10 Kevin Huber P	Practice squad: 48 Bryce Davis LS; 69 DeQuin Evans DE; 17 Vidal Hazelton WR; 60 Otis Hudson G; 76 Dan Knapp T; 5 Zac Robinson QB; 50 J. K. Schaffer LB; Reserve: 92 Jamaal Anderson DE (IR); 44 Tony Dye SS (IR); 21 Brandon Ghee CB (IR); 53 Thomas Howard OLB (IR); 27 Dre Kirkpatrick CB (IR); 52 Dontay Moch OLB (NF-Inj.); 2 Mike Nugent K (IR); 38 Shaun Prater CB (IR); 36 Chris Pressley FB (IR); 39 Taveon Rogers CB (IR); 31 Robert Sands FS (IR); 12 Mohamed Sanu WR; 28 Bernard Scott RB (IR); 70 Travelle Wharton G (IR); Rookies in italics 53 active, 14 reserve, 7 practice squad

== Preseason ==
Week	Date	Opponent	Result	Record	Venue	Recap
1	August 10	New York Jets	W 17–6	1–0	Paul Brown Stadium	Recap
2	August 16	at Atlanta Falcons	W 24–19	2–0	Georgia Dome	Recap
3	August 23	Green Bay Packers	L 13–27	2–1	Paul Brown Stadium	Recap
4	August 30	at Indianapolis Colts	L 16–20	2–2	Lucas Oil Stadium	Recap

== Regular season ==
=== Schedule ===
Week	Date	Opponent	Result	Record	Venue	Recap
1	September 10	at **Baltimore Ravens**	**L** 13–44	0–1	M&T Bank Stadium	Recap
2	September 16	**Cleveland Browns**	**W** 34–27	1–1	Paul Brown Stadium	Recap
3	September 23	at Washington Redskins	**W** 38–31	2–1	FedExField	Recap
4	September 30	at Jacksonville Jaguars	**W** 27–10	3–1	EverBank Field	Recap
5	October 7	Miami Dolphins	**L** 13–17	3–2	Paul Brown Stadium	Recap
6	October 14	at **Cleveland Browns**	**L** 24–34	3–3	Cleveland Browns Stadium	Recap
7	October 21	**Pittsburgh Steelers**	**L** 17–24	3–4	Paul Brown Stadium	Recap
8	Bye					
9	November 4	Denver Broncos	**L** 23–31	3–5	Paul Brown Stadium	Recap
10	November 11	New York Giants	**W** 31–13	4–5	Paul Brown Stadium	Recap
11	November 18	at Kansas City Chiefs	**W** 28–6	5–5	Arrowhead Stadium	Recap
12	November 25	Oakland Raiders	**W** 34–10	6–5	Paul Brown Stadium	Recap
13	December 2	at San Diego Chargers	**W** 20–13	7–5	Qualcomm Stadium	Recap
14	December 9	Dallas Cowboys	**L** 19–20	7–6	Paul Brown Stadium	Recap
15	December 13	at Philadelphia Eagles	**W** 34–13	8–6	Lincoln Financial Field	Recap
16	December 23	at **Pittsburgh Steelers**	**W** 13–10	9–6	Heinz Field	Recap
17	December 30	**Baltimore Ravens**	**W** 23–17	10–6	Paul Brown Stadium	Recap

Note: Intra-division opponents are in bold text.

=== Game summaries ===
==== Week 1: at Baltimore Ravens ====
Week One: Cincinnati Bengals at Baltimore Ravens – Game summary

Quarter	1	2	3	4	Total
Bengals	0	10	3	0	**13**
**Ravens**	10	7	17	10	**44**

at M&T Bank Stadium, Baltimore, Maryland

- Date: September 10
- Game time: 7:00 p.m. EDT
- Game weather: 74 °F (23 °C), clear
- Game attendance: 71,064
- Referee: Matt Nicks
- TV announcers (ESPN): Mike Tirico, Jon Gruden and Lisa Salters

Game information

**First quarter**

- BAL – Justin Tucker 46-yard field goal, 12:53. Ravens 3–0. **Drive: 5 plays, 51 yards, 2:07.**
- BAL – Ray Rice 7-yard run (Justin Tucker kick), 6:03. Ravens 10–0. **Drive: 12 plays, 63 yards, 5:45.**

**Second quarter**

- CIN – Mike Nugent 34-yard field goal, 14:52. Ravens 10–3. **Drive: 13 plays, 76 yards, 6:11.**
- BAL – Anquan Boldin 34-yard pass from Joe Flacco (Justin Tucker kick), 12:25. Ravens 17–3. **Drive: 5 plays, 82 yards, 2:27.**
- CIN – BenJarvus Green-Ellis 6-yard run (Mike Nugent kick), 0:18. Ravens 17–10. **Drive: 13 plays, 81 yards, 5:34.**

**Third quarter**

- CIN – Mike Nugent 19-yard field goal, 8:59. Ravens 17–13. **Drive: 12 plays, 79 yards, 6:01.**
- BAL – Dennis Pitta 10-yard pass from Joe Flacco (Justin Tucker kick), 5:18. Ravens 24–13. **Drive: 9 plays, 89 yards, 3:41.**
- BAL – Justin Tucker 40-yard field goal, 1:13. Ravens 27–13. **Drive: 8 plays, 53 yards, 3:09.**
- BAL – Ed Reed 34-yard interception return (Justin Tucker kick), 0:13. Ravens 34–13.

**Fourth quarter**

- BAL – Ray Rice 1-yard run (Justin Tucker kick), 14:04. Ravens 41–13. **Drive: 2 plays, 28 yards, 0:44.**
- BAL – Justin Tucker 39-yard field goal, 3:03. Ravens 44–13. **Drive: 10 plays, 61 yards, 5:20.**

**Top passers**

- CIN – Andy Dalton – 22/37, 221 yards, INT
- BAL – Joe Flacco – 21/29, 299 yards, 2 TD

**Top rushers**

- CIN – BenJarvus Green-Ellis – 18 rushes, 91 yards, TD
- BAL – Ray Rice – 10 rushes, 68 yards, 2 TD

**Top receivers**

- CIN – Andrew Hawkins – 8 receptions, 86 yards
- BAL – Dennis Pitta – 5 receptions, 73 yards, TD

The Bengals started their season on Monday Night Football against the Ravens. The first quarter was all Ravens as they put up a 10–0 lead when Justin Tucker kicked a 46-yard field goal followed up by Ray Rice running for a 7-yard TD. The Bengals got on the board in the 2nd quarter when Mike Nugent kicked a 34-yard field goal shortening the lead to 10–3. The Ravens pulled away when Anquan Boldin caught a 34-yard TD pass from Joe Flacco for a 17–3 game. The Bengals wrapped up the first half scoring with BenJarvus Green-Ellis running for a 6-yard TD for a 17–10 game. After the break, the Bengals came within 4 when Nugent nailed a 19-yard field goal for a 17–13 game. However, from that moment out it was all Ravens as Dennis Pitta caught a 10-yard TD pass from Joe Flacco for a 24–13 game followed by Tucker's 40-yard field goal to put them ahead 27–13 and Ed Reed's 40-yard interception return for a TD for a 34–13 game. In the last quarter, they wrapped the game up with Rice running for a 1-yard TD for a 41–13 game and Tucker's 39-yard field goal for a 44–13 final score.

With the loss, the Bengals started their season 0–1, losing their regular season opener for 4 out of the last 5 seasons dating back to 2008.

==== Week 2: vs. Cleveland Browns ====
Week Two: Cleveland Browns at Cincinnati Bengals – Game summary

Quarter	1	2	3	4	Total
Browns	3	7	7	10	**27**
**Bengals**	7	10	7	10	**34**

at Paul Brown Stadium, Cincinnati, Ohio

- Date: September 16
- Game time: 1:00 pm. EDT
- Game weather: 76 °F (24 °C), clear
- Game attendance: 63,036
- Referee: Jerry Hughes
- TV announcers (CBS): Bill Macatee and Steve Tasker

Game information

**First quarter**

- CIN – Pacman Jones 81-yard punt return (Mike Nugent kick), 13:13. Bengals 7–0.
- CLE – Phil Dawson 50-yard field goal, 9:01. Bengals 7–3. **Drive: 9 plays, 32 yards, 4:12.**

**Second quarter**

- CIN – A. J. Green 10-yard pass from Andy Dalton (Mike Nugent kick), 10:27. Bengals 14–3. **Drive: 8 plays, 74 yards, 4:25.**
- CLE – Trent Richardson 32-yard run (Phil Dawson kick), 8:05. Bengals 14–10. **Drive: 5 plays, 76 yards, 2:22.**
- CIN – Mike Nugent 39-yard field goal, 4:45. Bengals 17–10. **Drive: 7 plays, 56 yards, 3:20.**

**Third quarter**

- CIN – Brandon Tate 44-yard pass from Andy Dalton (Mike Nugent kick), 11:58. Bengals 24–10. **Drive: 7 plays, 80 yards, 3:02.**
- CLE – Trent Richardson 23-yard pass from Brandon Weeden (Phil Dawson kick), 0:07. Bengals 24–17. **Drive: 5 plays, 53 yards, 2:12.**

**Fourth quarter**

- CIN – Andrew Hawkins 50-yard pass from Andy Dalton (Mike Nugent kick), 10:44. Bengals 31–17. **Drive: 8 plays, 77 yards, 4:23.**
- CLE – Greg Little 24-yard pass from Brandon Weeden (Phil Dawson kick), 7:11. Bengals 31–24. **Drive: 8 plays, 80 yards, 3:33.**
- CIN – Mike Nugent 37-yard field goal, 2:09. Bengals 34–24. **Drive: 11 plays, 58 yards, 5:02.**
- CLE – Phil Dawson 25-yard field goal, 0:20. Bengals 34–27. **Drive: 9 plays, 66 yards, 1:49.**

**Top passers**

- CLE – Brandon Weeden – 26/37, 322 yards, 2 TD
- CIN – Andy Dalton – 24/31, 318 yards, 3 TD, INT

**Top rushers**

- CLE – Trent Richardson – 19 rushes, 109 yards, TD
- CIN – BenJarvus Green-Ellis – 21 rushes, 75 yards

**Top receivers**

- CLE – Mohamed Massaquoi – 5 receptions, 90 yards
- CIN – Brandon Tate – 3 receptions, 71 yards, TD

After a tough loss on Monday Night Football, the Bengals returned home for Week 2 against the Browns. The Bengals were able to get the first points on the board with Adam "Pacman" Jones returning a punt 81 yards for a touchdown for a 7–0 lead. The Browns then shortened their lead to 4 points with Phil Dawson's 50-yard field goal to make the score 7–3. The Bengals then moved ahead by 11 points as Andy Dalton found A. J. Green on a 10-yard touchdown pass for a 14–3 lead, however the Browns again came within 4 as Trent Richardson ran for a touchdown from 32 yards out. The Bengals then moved ahead 17–10 with Mike Nugent's 39-yard field goal before halftime. Coming back, the Bengals increased their lead with Dalton finding Brandon Tate on a 44-yard pass for a 24–10 lead. However, The Browns drew closer as Brandon Weeden found Richardson on a 23-yard pass to shorten the game to 24–17. Then the Bengals moved up in the 4th quarter as Dalton found Andrew Hawkins on a 50-yard touchdown pass for a 31–17 lead but the Browns came within a touchdown after Weeden found Greg Little on a 24-yard pass to make the score 31–24. Mike Nugent then nailed a 37-yard field goal to give the Bengals a 34–24 lead then the Browns wrapped things up as Phil Dawson scored a 25-yard field goal for a final score of 34–27.

With the win, the Bengals improved to 1–1.

==== Week 3: at Washington Redskins ====
Week Three: Cincinnati Bengals at Washington Redskins – Game summary

Quarter	1	2	3	4	Total
**Bengals**	14	10	0	14	**38**
Redskins	7	3	14	7	**31**

at FedExField, Landover, Maryland

- Date: September 23
- Game time: 1:00 pm. EDT
- Game weather: 65 °F (18 °C), sunny
- Game attendance: 80,060
- Referee: Matt Nicks
- TV announcers (CBS): Kevin Harlan and Solomon Wilcots

Game information

**First quarter**

- CIN – A. J. Green 73-yard pass from Mohamed Sanu (Mike Nugent kick), 14:43. Bengals 7–0. **Drive: 1 play, 73 yards, 0:17.**
- WAS – Rob Jackson interception in endzone (Billy Cundiff kick), 11:00. Tied 7–7.
- CIN – Armon Binns 48-yard pass from Andy Dalton (Mike Nugent kick), 3:28. Bengals 14–7. **Drive: 5 plays, 58 yards, 2:12.**

**Second quarter**

- CIN – Mike Nugent 47-yard field goal, 4:36. Bengals 17–7. **Drive: 6 plays, 20 yards, 3:15.**
- CIN – BenJarvus Green-Ellis 1-yard run (Mike Nugent kick), 3:13. Bengals 24–7. **Drive: 2 plays, 12 yards, 0:36.**
- WAS – Billy Cundiff 36-yard field goal, 0:31. Bengals 24–10. **Drive: 8 plays, 30 yards, 2:42.**

**Third quarter**

- WAS – Alfred Morris 7-yard run (Billy Cundiff kick), 10:23. Bengals 24–17. **Drive: 9 plays, 80 yards, 4:37.**
- WAS – Santana Moss 3-yard pass from Robert Griffin III (Billy Cundiff kick), 3:29. Tied 24–24. **Drive: 10 plays, 86 yards, 5:28.**

**Fourth quarter**

- CIN – Jermaine Gresham 6-yard pass from Andy Dalton (Mike Nugent kick), 11:24. Bengals 31–24. **Drive: 5 plays, 80 yards, 2:03.**
- CIN – Andrew Hawkins 59-yard pass from Andy Dalton (Mike Nugent kick), 7:08. Bengals 38–24. **Drive: 4 plays, 72 yards, 2:01.**
- WAS – Robert Griffin III 2-yard run (Billy Cundiff kick), 3:35. Bengals 38–31. **Drive: 12 plays, 90 yards, 3:33.**

**Top passers**

- CIN – Andy Dalton – 19/27, 328 yards, 3 TD, INT
- WAS – Robert Griffin III – 21/34, 221 yards, TD

**Top rushers**

- CIN – BenJarvus Green-Ellis – 17 rushes, 38 yards, TD
- WAS – Alfred Morris – 17 rushes, 78 yards, TD

**Top receivers**

- CIN – A. J. Green – 9 receptions, 183 yards, TD
- WAS – Fred Davis – 7 receptions, 90 yards

Sitting at 1–1, the Bengals traveled to Washington to face the Redskins, with rookie quarterback Robert Griffin III making his home debut. On the first play from scrimmage, Bengals' wide receiver and former college quarterback Mohamed Sanu launched a 73-yard touchdown to AJ Green to give Cincinnati an early touchdown advantage. Bengals third-year quarterback Andy Dalton started his day with a 0-yard interception touchdown by Rob Jackson that tied the game at seven, but soon went on an impressive tear the rest of the game. Dalton rebounded with a 48-yard touchdown to Armon Binns, part of 17 unanswered points by the Bengals that gave them a 24–7 lead late in the first half. Billy Cundiff added a late field goal that made the score 24–10, Cincinnati, at half time. The Redskins made a run at the Bengals in the third quarter, scoring back-to-back touchdowns on a touchdown run by Alfred Morris and a two-yard pass from Griffin to Santana Moss, which tied the game at 24. However, on the first two fourth-quarter drives for Cincinnati, Dalton gave his team the lead back—firing two touchdowns, one to Jermaine Gresham from six yards away, the other to Andrew Hawkins who dashed and weaved his way for a 59-yard score that put Cincinnati once again up 14, 38–24. Robert Griffin III scrambled and dived his way into the end zone with three-and-a-half minutes remaining, but the Redskins' comeback effort fell short as Griffin's hail Mary pass was knocked away on the final play.

With the win, the Bengals improved to 2–1.

==== Week 4: at Jacksonville Jaguars ====
Week Four: Cincinnati Bengals at Jacksonville Jaguars – Game summary

Quarter	1	2	3	4	Total
**Bengals**	3	14	0	10	**27**
Jaguars	0	7	3	0	**10**

at EverBank Field, Jacksonville, Florida

- Date: September 30
- Game time: 4:05 pm. EDT
- Game weather: 86 °F (30 °C), partly cloudy
- Game attendance: 63,030
- Referee: Ed Hochuli
- TV announcers (CBS): Marv Albert and Rich Gannon

Game information

**First quarter**

- CIN – Mike Nugent 35-yard field goal, 6:10. Bengals 3–0. **Drive: 14 plays, 74 yards, 6:11.**

**Second quarter**

- JAX – Marcedes Lewis 2-yard pass from Blaine Gabbert (Josh Scobee kick), 13:33. Jaguars 7–3. **Drive: 13 plays, 77 yards, 7:37.**
- CIN – Chris Pressley 1-yard pass from Andy Dalton (Mike Nugent kick), 6:16. Bengals 10–7. **Drive: 8 plays, 75 yards, 3:43.**
- CIN – Andy Dalton 1-yard run (Mike Nugent kick), 1:11. Bengals 17–7. **Drive: 6 plays, 60 yards, 2:06.**

**Third quarter**

- JAX – Josh Scobee 21-yard field goal, 3:04. Bengals 17–10. **Drive: 14 plays, 77 yards, 7:55.**

**Fourth quarter**

- CIN – A. J. Green 18-yard pass from Andy Dalton (Mike Nugent kick), 13:51. Bengals 24–10. **Drive: 8 plays, 80 yards, 4:13.**
- CIN – Mike Nugent 35-yard field goal, 12:38. Bengals 27–10. **Drive: 4 plays, 0 yards, 1:01.**

**Top passers**

- CIN – Andy Dalton – 20/31, 244 yards, 2 TD
- JAX – Blaine Gabbert – 23/34, 186 yards, TD, INT

**Top rushers**

- CIN – BenJarvus Green-Ellis – 26 rushes, 82 yards
- JAX – Maurice Jones-Drew – 13 rushes, 38 yards

**Top receivers**

- CIN – A. J. Green – 6 receptions, 117 yards, TD
- JAX – Justin Blackmon – 6 receptions, 48 yards

With the win, the Bengals improved to 3–1, their 3rd 3–1 start under head coach Marvin Lewis.

==== Week 5: vs. Miami Dolphins ====
Week Five: Miami Dolphins at Cincinnati Bengals – Game summary

Quarter	1	2	3	4	Total
**Dolphins**	0	7	10	0	**17**
Bengals	6	0	0	7	**13**

at Paul Brown Stadium, Cincinnati, Ohio

- Date: October 7
- Game time: 1:00 pm. EDT
- Game weather: 49 °F (9 °C), cloudy
- Game attendance: 61,162
- Referee: Walt Coleman
- TV announcers (CBS): Marv Albert and Rich Gannon

Game information

**First quarter**

- CIN – Mike Nugent 42-yard field goal, 10:35. Bengals 3–0. **Drive: 4 plays, 2 yards, 1:19.**
- CIN – Mike Nugent 24-yard field goal, 0:13. Bengals 6–0. **Drive: 13 plays, 72 yards, 6:02.**

**Second quarter**

- MIA – Daniel Thomas 1-yard run (Dan Carpenter kick), 6:54. Dolphins 7–6. **Drive: 9 plays, 63 yards, 4:04.**

**Third quarter**

- MIA – Reggie Bush 13-yard run (Dan Carpenter kick), 12:18. Dolphins 14–6. **Drive: 3 plays, 36 yards, 0:54.**
- MIA – Dan Carpenter 46-yard field goal, 8:35. Dolphins 17–6. **Drive: 7 plays, 22 yards, 2:39.**

**Fourth quarter**

- CIN – A. J. Green 2-yard pass from Andy Dalton (Mike Nugent kick), 14:15. Dolphins 17–13. **Drive: 9 plays, 57 yards, 5:07.**

**Top passers**

- MIA – Ryan Tannehill – 17/26, 223 yards
- CIN – Andy Dalton – 26/43, 234 yards, TD, 2 INT

**Top rushers**

- MIA – Reggie Bush – 19 rushes, 48 yards, TD
- CIN – Bernard Scott – 5 rushes, 40 yards

**Top receivers**

- MIA – Brian Hartline – 4 receptions, 59 yards
- CIN – A. J. Green – 9 receptions, 65 yards, TD

With the loss, the Bengals dropped to 3–2. With the Ravens' win over the Chiefs, the Bengals now sit in 2nd place in the AFC North.

==== Week 6: at Cleveland Browns ====
Week Six: Cincinnati Bengals at Cleveland Browns – Game summary

Quarter	1	2	3	4	Total
Bengals	7	7	0	10	**24**
**Browns**	0	7	6	21	**34**

at Cleveland Browns Stadium, Cleveland, Ohio

- Date: October 14
- Game time: 1:00 pm. EDT
- Game weather: 70 °F (21 °C), sunny
- Game attendance: 67,060
- Referee: Pete Morelli
- TV announcers (CBS): Kevin Harlan and Solomon Wilcots

Game information

**First quarter**

- CIN – Jermaine Gresham 55-yard pass from Andy Dalton (Mike Nugent kick), 7:07. Bengals 7–0. **Drive: 3 plays, 63 yards, 1:35.**

**Second quarter**

- CLE – Josh Gordon 71-yard pass from Brandon Weeden (Phil Dawson kick), 14:51. Tied 7–7. **Drive: 6 plays, 87 yards, 2:11.**
- CIN – A. J. Green 4-yard pass from Andy Dalton (Mike Nugent kick), 1:54. Bengals 14–7. **Drive: 3 plays, 27 yards, 1:17.**

**Third quarter**

- CLE – Phil Dawson 41-yard field goal, 8:25. Bengals 14–10. **Drive: 4 plays, 7 yards, 1:28.**
- CLE – Phil Dawson 38-yard field goal, 6:27. Bengals 14–13. **Drive: 4 plays, 5 yards, 1:05.**

**Fourth quarter**

- CLE – Montario Hardesty 1-yard run (Phil Dawson kick), 14:56. Browns 20–14. **Drive: 10 plays, 66 yards, 5:17.**
- CIN – Mike Nugent 44-yard field goal, 11:11. Browns 20–17. **Drive: 8 plays, 34 yards, 3:45.**
- CLE – Benjamin Watson 3-yard pass from Brandon Weeden (Phil Dawson kick), 8:00. Browns 27–17. **Drive: 6 plays, 63 yards, 3:11.**
- CLE – Sheldon Brown 19-yard interception return (Phil Dawson kick), 7:50. Browns 34–17.
- CIN – A. J. Green 57-yard pass from Andy Dalton (Mike Nugent kick), 5:21. Browns 34–24. **Drive: 6 plays, 79 yards, 2:29.**

**Top passers**

- CIN – Andy Dalton – 31/46, 381 yards, 3 TD, 3 INT
- CLE – Brandon Weeden – 17/29, 231 yards, 2 TD, INT

**Top rushers**

- CIN – BenJarvus Green-Ellis – 16 rushes, 62 yards
- CLE – Montario Hardesty – 15 rushes, 56 yards, TD

**Top receivers**

- CIN – A. J. Green – 7 receptions, 135 yards, 2 TD
- CLE – Josh Gordon – 3 receptions, 99 yards, TD

With the surprising loss, the Bengals dropped to 3–3 and their 4-game winning streak against the Browns was snapped.

==== Week 7: vs. Pittsburgh Steelers ====
Week Seven: Pittsburgh Steelers at Cincinnati Bengals – Game summary

Quarter	1	2	3	4	Total
Steelers	3	11	3	7	**24**
Bengals	7	7	3	0	**17**

at Paul Brown Stadium, Cincinnati, Ohio

- Date: October 21
- Game time: 8:20 pm. EDT
- Game attendance: 63,411
- Referee: Clete Blakeman
- TV announcers (NBC): Al Michaels, Cris Collinsworth and Michele Tafoya

Game information

**First quarter**

- PIT – Shaun Suisham 42-yard field goal, 10:26. Steelers 3–0. **Drive: 9 plays, 36 yards, 4:34.**
- CIN – Cedric Peerman 5-yard run (Mike Nugent kick), 2:17. Bengals 7–3. **Drive: 15 plays, 80 yards, 8:09.**

**Second quarter**

- CIN – A. J. Green 8-yard pass from Andy Dalton (Mike Nugent kick), 8:29. Bengals 14–3. **Drive: 1 play, 8 yards, 0:05.**
- PIT – Shaun Suisham 47-yard field goal, 3:07. Bengals 14–6. **Drive: 10 plays, 60 yards, 5:22.**
- PIT – Heath Miller 9-yard pass from Ben Roethlisberger (Ben Roethlisberger-Heath Miller pass), 0:24. Tied 14–14. **Drive: 6 plays, 29 yards, 0:59.**

**Third quarter**

- CIN – Mike Nugent 48-yard field goal, 11:09. Bengals 17–14. **Drive: 7 plays, 32 yards, 3:51.**
- PIT – Shaun Suisham 42-yard field goal, 8:17. Tied 17–17. **Drive: 6 plays, 37 yards, 2:52.**

**Fourth quarter**

- PIT – Chris Rainey 11-yard run (Shaun Suisham kick), 14:16. Steelers 24–17. **Drive: 8 plays, 67 yards, 4:42.**

**Top passers**

- PIT – Ben Roethlisberger – 27/38, 278 yards, TD, INT
- CIN – Andy Dalton – 14/28, 105 yards, TD, INT

**Top rushers**

- PIT – Jonathan Dwyer – 17 rushes, 122 yards
- CIN – BenJarvus Green-Ellis – 18 rushes, 69 yards

**Top receivers**

- PIT – Antonio Brown – 7 receptions, 96 yards
- CIN – Ryan Whalen – 4 receptions, 31 yards

The Bengals went home for a divisional game against their longtime rival Steelers. The Steelers came into this stadium 0–3 in road games. Despite the Bengals holding an 11-point lead in the second quarter, it was erased as the Steelers won the game 24–17. The loss dropped the Bengals to 3–4 and 3rd place in the AFC North.

==== Week 9: vs. Denver Broncos ====
Week Nine: Denver Broncos at Cincinnati Bengals – Game summary

Quarter	1	2	3	4	Total
**Broncos**	3	7	7	14	**31**
Bengals	0	3	10	10	**23**

at Paul Brown Stadium, Cincinnati, Ohio

- Date: November 4
- Game time: 1:00 pm. EST
- Game weather: 48 °F (9 °C), partly cloudy
- Game attendance: 63,623
- Referee: Scott Green
- TV announcers (CBS): Greg Gumbel and Dan Dierdorf

Game information

**First quarter**

- DEN – Matt Prater 43-yard field goal, 7:55. Broncos 3–0. **Drive: 12 plays, 55 yards, 5:26.**

**Second quarter**

- CIN – Mike Nugent 28-yard field goal, 14:12. Tied 3–3. **Drive: 10 plays, 57 yards, 4:23.**
- DEN – Eric Decker 13-yard pass from Peyton Manning (Matt Prater kick), 10:15. Broncos 10–3. **Drive: 8 plays, 80 yards, 3:57.**

**Third quarter**

- DEN – Trindon Holliday 105-yard kickoff return (Matt Prater kick), 14:49. Broncos 17–3.
- CIN – A. J. Green 10-yard pass from Andy Dalton (Mike Nugent kick), 11:33. Broncos 17–10. **Drive: 6 plays, 80 yards, 3:16.**
- CIN – Mike Nugent 49-yard field goal, 1:17. Broncos 17–13. **Drive: 9 plays, 49 yards, 4:13.**

**Fourth quarter**

- CIN – BenJarvus Green-Ellis 2-yard run (Mike Nugent kick), 14:10. Bengals 20–17. **Drive: 4 plays, 27 yards, 0:51.**
- DEN – Joel Dreessen 1-yard pass from Peyton Manning (Matt Prater kick), 11:47. Broncos 24–20. **Drive: 5 plays, 80 yards, 2:23.**
- DEN – Eric Decker 4-yard pass from Peyton Manning (Matt Prater kick), 3:36. Broncos 31–20. **Drive: 8 plays, 46 yards, 5:02.**
- CIN – Mike Nugent 41-yard field goal, 0:52. Broncos 31–23. **Drive: 12 plays, 47 yards, 2:44.**

**Top passers**

- DEN – Peyton Manning – 27/35, 291 yards, 3 TD, 2 INT
- CIN – Andy Dalton – 26/42, 299 yards, TD, INT

**Top rushers**

- DEN – Willis McGahee – 23 rushes, 66 yards
- CIN – BenJarvus Green-Ellis – 17 rushes, 56 yards, TD

**Top receivers**

- DEN – Eric Decker – 8 receptions, 99 yards, TD
- CIN – Jermaine Gresham- 6 receptions, 108 yards

The Bengals returned home following their bye week for a week 9 matchup with the Denver Broncos. They entered the game having lost three straight games following their 3–1 start to the season. Entering the game, Broncos quarterback Peyton Manning had never lost to Cincinnati in his career. The two teams traded field goals early, with Broncos kicker Matt Prater connecting on a 43-yard field goal and the Bengals Mike Nugent successfully booting a 28-yard attempt. On the Broncos possession following the Bengals field goal, Peyton Manning masterfully moved the Broncos down the field, dissecting the Cincinnati secondary quickly, leading to an eight play, eighty yard drive, highlighted by a forty-five yard strike to receiver Demarious Thomas, and culminated with a thirteen-yard pass to Eric Decker for the score. Following the Broncos touchdown, Denver led 10–3. The Broncos increased their lead to a score of 17–3 on the opening kickoff of the second half, as receiver Trindon Holliday returned the football 105 yards for the score, dealing a sharp blow to a Bengals team that had previously been sticking close to the Broncos. The score appeared to motivate the Bengals, as they scored the next seventeen points. Second year receiver AJ Green captured a touchdown reception for the seventh straight game, after quarterback Andy Dalton found him on a 10-yard strike. Each of the next two Denver possessions were ended by Cincinnati cornerback Terrance Newman intercepting Denver quarterback Peyton Manning. A forty-nine yard Mike Nugent field goal, and a two-yard BenJarvus Green-Ellis touchdown run were the result of the two ensuing Bengal possessions; giving them a 20–17 advantage. Peyton Manning then engineered back-to-back touchdown drives, separated by Andy Dalton throwing an interception of his own. Because the drives took place in the fourth quarter, Manning was officially credited with his forty-eighth career game-winning drive, surpassing Dan Marino for the NFL record. The Bengals attempted a late comeback, scoring three points on a Mike Nugent field goal, but were unable to recover an onside kick attempt to give themselves a chance to tie the game.

With the loss, the Bengals dropped to 3–5.

==== Week 10: vs. New York Giants ====
Week Ten: New York Giants at Cincinnati Bengals – Game summary

Quarter	1	2	3	4	Total
Giants	3	3	0	7	**13**
**Bengals**	14	3	14	0	**31**

at Paul Brown Stadium, Cincinnati, Ohio

- Date: November 11
- Game time: 1:00 pm. EST
- Game weather: 69 °F (21 °C), partly cloudy
- Game attendance: 56,614
- Referee: Mike Carey
- TV announcers (Fox): Thom Brennaman, Brian Billick and Laura Okmin (blacked out locally)

Game information

**First quarter**

- CIN – A. J. Green 56-yard pass from Andy Dalton (Mike Nugent kick), 12:34. Bengals 7–0. **Drive: 5 plays, 79 yards, 2:26.**
- CIN – Andrew Hawkins 11-yard pass from Andy Dalton (Mike Nugent kick), 10:53. Bengals 14–0. **Drive: 3 plays, 11 yards, 0:18.**
- NYG – Lawrence Tynes 23-yard field goal, 5:34. Bengals 14–3. **Drive: 6 plays, 22 yards, 3:00.**

**Second quarter**

- CIN – Mike Nugent 28-yard field goal, 4:17. Bengals 17–3. **Drive: 15 plays, 60 yards, 7:46.**
- NYG – Lawrence Tynes 31-yard field goal, 0:11. Bengals 17–6. **Drive: 14 plays, 69 yards, 4:06.**

**Third quarter**

- CIN – Jermaine Gresham 10-yard pass from Andy Dalton (Mike Nugent kick), 6:37. Bengals 24–6. **Drive: 3 plays, 12 yards, 0:35.**
- CIN – Mohamed Sanu 10-yard pass from Andy Dalton (Mike Nugent kick), 4:20. Bengals 31–6. **Drive: 3 plays, 16 yards, 1:21.**

**Fourth quarter**

- NYG – Andre Brown 2-yard run (Lawrence Tynes kick), 2:46. Bengals 31–13. **Drive: 13 plays, 98 yards, 5:22.**

**Top passers**

- NYG – Eli Manning – 29/46, 215 yards, 2 INT
- CIN – Andy Dalton – 21/30, 199 yards, 4 TD

**Top rushers**

- NYG – Andre Brown – 7 rushes, 65 yards, TD
- CIN – BenJarvus Green-Ellis – 15 rushes, 50 yards

**Top receivers**

- NYG – Hakeem Nicks – 9 receptions, 75 yards
- CIN – A. J. Green – 7 receptions, 85 yards, TD

The Cincinnati Bengals entered their week ten matchup with the New York Giants reeling after four consecutive losses, separated by their week 8 bye week. Following their 3–1 start to the season, the Bengals had lost all momentum and fallen heavily in the AFC standings. Despite being heavy underdogs, the Bengals dominated the defending Super Bowl champions from start to finish, forcing four turnovers. With the win, they improved to 4–5 and snapped their 4-game losing streak.

==== Week 11: at Kansas City Chiefs ====
Week Eleven: Cincinnati Bengals at Kansas City Chiefs – Game summary

Quarter	1	2	3	4	Total
**Bengals**	7	14	0	7	**28**
Chiefs	3	3	0	0	**6**

at Arrowhead Stadium, Kansas City, Missouri

- Date: November 18
- Game time: 1:00 pm. EST/12:00 p.m. CST
- Game weather: 59 °F (15 °C), sunny
- Game attendance: 63,336
- Referee: Gene Steratore
- TV announcers (CBS): Marv Albert and Rich Gannon

Game information

**First quarter**

- KC – Ryan Succop 34-yard field goal, 8:31. Chiefs 3–0. **Drive: 8 plays, 59 yards, 2:59.**
- CIN – A. J. Green 4-yard pass from Andy Dalton (Mike Nugent kick), 2:51. Bengals 7–3. **Drive: 11 plays, 78 yards, 5:40.**

**Second quarter**

- CIN – Andy Dalton 1-yard run (Mike Nugent kick), 7:52. Bengals 14–3. **Drive: 5 plays, 57 yards, 2:13.**
- CIN – BenJarvus Green-Ellis 1-yard run (Mike Nugent kick), 0:53. Bengals 21–3. **Drive: 11 plays, 79 yards, 5:23.**
- KC – Ryan Succop 33-yard field goal, 0:00. Bengals 21–6. **Drive: 7 plays, 65 yards, 0:53.**

**Third quarter**

- No scoring plays.

**Fourth quarter**

- CIN – Mohamed Sanu 14-yard pass from Andy Dalton (Mike Nugent kick), 9:39. Bengals 28–6. **Drive: 12 plays, 72 yards, 5:21.**

**Top passers**

- CIN – Andy Dalton – 18/29, 230 yards, 2 TD
- KC – Brady Quinn – 9/14, 95 yards

**Top rushers**

- CIN – BenJarvus Green-Ellis – 25 rushes, 101 yards, TD
- KC – Jamaal Charles – 17 rushes, 87 yards

**Top receivers**

- CIN – A. J. Green – 6 receptions, 91 yards, TD
- KC – Tony Moeaki – 4 receptions, 73 yards

The Bengals entered their week eleven matchup with the Kansas City Chiefs sporting a 4–5 record coming off an upset victory over reigning the Super Bowl champions, the New York Giants. The Bengals cruised to an easy victory, not allowing a touchdown on defense. With the win, the Bengals improved to 5–5.

==== Week 12: vs. Oakland Raiders ====
Week Twelve: Oakland Raiders at Cincinnati Bengals – Game summary

Quarter	1	2	3	4	Total
Raiders	0	0	10	0	**10**
**Bengals**	14	10	0	10	**34**

at Paul Brown Stadium, Cincinnati, Ohio

- Date: November 25
- Game time: 1:00 pm. EST
- Game weather: 34 °F (1 °C), mostly sunny
- Game attendance: 56,503
- Referee: Alberto Riveron
- TV announcers (CBS): Bill Macatee and Steve Tasker (blacked out locally)

Game information

**First quarter**

- CIN – BenJarvus Green-Ellis 1-yard run (Mike Nugent kick), 9:12. Bengals 7–0. **Drive: 5 plays, 58 yards, 2:19.**
- CIN – Mohamed Sanu 2-yard pass from Andy Dalton (Mike Nugent kick), 2:59. Bengals 14–0. **Drive: 9 plays, 88 yards, 4:28.**

**Second quarter**

- CIN – Mohamed Sanu 5-yard pass from Andy Dalton (Mike Nugent kick), 7:28. Bengals 21–0. **Drive: 13 plays, 89 yards, 5:58.**
- CIN – Mike Nugent 55-yard field goal, 0:00. Bengals 24–0. **Drive: 2 plays, 11 yards, 0:08.**

**Third quarter**

- OAK – Sebastian Janikowski 55-yard field goal, 10:28. Bengals 24–3. **Drive: 6 plays, 13 yards, 3:32.**
- OAK – Denarius Moore 20-yard pass from Carson Palmer (Sebastian Janikowski kick), 2:21. Bengals 24–10. **Drive: 5 plays, 52 yards, 3:08.**

**Fourth quarter**

- CIN – Mike Nugent 20-yard field goal, 12:29. Bengals 27–10. **Drive: 6 plays, 44 yards, 2:23.**
- CIN – Jermaine Gresham 7-yard pass from Andy Dalton (Mike Nugent kick), 3:39. Bengals 34–10. **Drive: 12 plays, 84 yards, 5:11.**

**Top passers**

- OAK – Carson Palmer – 19/34, 146 yards, TD, INT
- CIN – Andy Dalton – 16/30, 210 yards, 3 TD

**Top rushers**

- OAK – Marcel Reece – 15 rushes, 74 yards
- CIN – BenJarvus Green-Ellis – 19 rushes, 129 yards, TD

**Top receivers**

- OAK – Jeremy Stewart – 6 receptions, 37 yards
- CIN – A. J. Green – 3 receptions, 111 yards

In Carson Palmer's long-awaited return to the Queen City after departing following the 2010 season, the Bengals set the tone from the beginning of the contest, with Geno Atkins slamming a play-action Palmer to the turf on the game's first play from scrimmage. After a BenJarvus Green-Ellis one-yard touchdown run opened the scoring for Cincinnati, quarterback Andy Dalton tossed back-to-back red zone scores to wide receiver Mohamed Sanu to give Cincinnati a 21-point advantage. Kicker Mike Nugent added on to that lead with a 55-yard field goal as time expired in the second quarter to give the Bengals a 24–0 lead going into intermission. Oakland responded with a great third quarter, however; following Sebastian Janikowski's own 55-yarder that put Oakland on the board, Palmer lofted a 20-yard touchdown to Denarius Moore that made the score 24–10, Bengals. After a Kevin Huber punt gave Oakland the ball back and a chance to cut the lead into single digits, Palmer was sacked and stripped by Manny Lawson near midfield, and linebacker Rey Maualuga recovered. It was all Cincinnati after that as Nugent knocked his second field goal of the game to extend Cincinnati's lead to three possessions. Dalton added one more touchdown on the day, finding tight end Jermaine Gresham from seven yards away to make the score 34–10, which stood as the final.

Coming into the game, A. J. Green had a streak of nine consecutive games in which he scored a touchdown. That streak, however, was snapped in this game, although he did have 111 receiving yards on three catches.

==== Week 13: at San Diego Chargers ====
Week Thirteen: Cincinnati Bengals at San Diego Chargers – Game summary

Quarter	1	2	3	4	Total
**Bengals**	7	3	0	10	**20**
Chargers	0	13	0	0	**13**

at Qualcomm Stadium, San Diego, California

- Date: December 2
- Game time: 4:25 pm. EST/1:25 p.m. PST
- Game weather: 66 °F (19 °C), cloudy
- Game attendance: 54,980
- Referee: Walt Coleman
- TV announcers (CBS): Marv Albert and Rich Gannon

Game information

**First quarter**

- CIN – Jermaine Gresham 19-yard pass from Andy Dalton (Mike Nugent kick), 7:39. Bengals 7–0. **Drive: 16 plays, 91 yards, 7:21.**

**Second quarter**

- SD – Nick Novak 20-yard field goal, 14:57. Bengals 7–3. **Drive: 13 plays, 79 yards, 7:42.**
- SD – Demorrio Williams 31-yard interception return (Nick Novak kick), 14:09. Chargers 10–7.
- CIN – Mike Nugent 19-yard field goal, 9:38. Tied 10–10. **Drive: 10 plays, 82 yards, 4:35.**
- SD – Nick Novak 19-yard field goal, 0:00. Chargers 13–10. **Drive: 11 plays, 85 yards, 1:45.**

**Third quarter**

- No scoring plays.

**Fourth quarter**

- CIN – Andy Dalton 6-yard run (Mike Nugent kick), 4:11. Bengals 17–13. **Drive: 14 plays, 55 yards, 7:42.**
- CIN – Mike Nugent 24-yard field goal, 2:47. Bengals 20–13. **Drive: 4 plays, 7 yards, 1:07.**

**Top passers**

- CIN – Andy Dalton – 25/38, 211 yards, TD, 2 INT
- SD – Philip Rivers – 26/48, 280 yards, INT

**Top rushers**

- CIN – BenJarvus Green-Ellis – 25 rushes, 118 yards
- SD – Ryan Mathews – 9 rushes, 26 yards

**Top receivers**

- CIN – A. J. Green – 9 receptions, 85 yards
- SD – Danario Alexander – 6 receptions, 102 yards

With the win, the Bengals went to 7–5.

==== Week 14: vs. Dallas Cowboys ====
Week Fourteen: Dallas Cowboys at Cincinnati Bengals – Game summary

Quarter	1	2	3	4	Total
**Cowboys**	3	7	0	10	**20**
Bengals	10	3	6	0	**19**

at Paul Brown Stadium, Cincinnati, Ohio

- Date: December 9
- Game time: 1:00 pm. EST
- Game weather: 38 °F (3 °C), cloudy
- Game attendance: 63,590
- Referee: Bill Vinovich
- TV announcers (Fox): Thom Brennaman, Brian Billick, and Laura Okmin

Game information

**First quarter**

- DAL – Dan Bailey 37-yard field goal, 8:36. Cowboys 3–0. **Drive: 12 plays, 61 yards, 6:24.**
- CIN – Andrew Hawkins 8-yard pass from Andy Dalton (Josh Brown kick), 6:41. Bengals 7–3. **Drive: 5 plays, 70 yards, 1:55.**
- CIN – Josh Brown 25-yard field goal, 1:39. Bengals 10–3. **Drive: 8 plays, 40 yards, 3:58.**

**Second quarter**

- DAL – DeMarco Murray 1-yard run (Dan Bailey kick), 10:33. Tied 10–10. **Drive: 4 plays, 27 yards, 1:27.**
- CIN – Josh Brown 33-yard field goal, 3:24. Bengals 13–10. **Drive: 12 plays, 66 yards, 7:09.**

**Third quarter**

- CIN – Josh Brown 25-yard field goal, 9:22. Bengals 16–10. **Drive: 12 plays, 70 yards, 5:38.**
- CIN – Josh Brown 52-yard field goal, 6:45. Bengals 19–10. **Drive: 6 plays, 18 yards, 1:09.**

**Fourth quarter**

- DAL – Dez Bryant 27-yard pass from Tony Romo (Dan Bailey kick), 6:35. Bengals 19–17. **Drive: 8 plays, 68 yards, 3:12.**
- DAL – Dan Bailey 40-yard field goal, 0:00. Cowboys 20–19. **Drive: 13 plays, 50 yards, 3:44.**

**Top passers**

- DAL – Tony Romo – 25/43, 268 yards, TD, INT
- CIN – Andy Dalton – 20/33, 206 yards, TD, INT

**Top rushers**

- DAL – DeMarco Murray – 21 rushes, 53 yards, TD
- CIN – BenJarvus Green-Ellis – 12 rushes, 89 yards

**Top receivers**

- DAL – Jason Witten – 4 receptions, 62 yards
- CIN – Marvin Jones Jr. – 3 receptions, 45 yards

Dan Bailey's clutch field goal to beat Cincinnati dropped the Bengals' record to 7–6. It was the second consecutive game in which A. J. Green did not record a touchdown reception; he had in eight straight before that. This would also be Cincinnati's last home loss until week 10 in 2014 against Cleveland.

==== Week 15: at Philadelphia Eagles ====
Week Fifteen: Cincinnati Bengals at Philadelphia Eagles – Game summary

Quarter	1	2	3	4	Total
**Bengals**	10	0	14	10	**34**
Eagles	0	13	0	0	**13**

at Lincoln Financial Field, Philadelphia, Pennsylvania

- Date: December 13
- Game time: 8:20 pm. EST
- Game weather: 36 °F (2 °C), cloudy
- Game attendance: 69,144
- Referee: Carl Cheffers
- TV announcers (NFLN): Brad Nessler, Mike Mayock and Alex Flanagan

Game information

**First quarter**

- CIN – BenJarvus Green-Ellis 1-yard run (Josh Brown kick), 11:10. Bengals 7–0. **Drive: 6 plays, 44 yards, 3:01.**
- CIN – Josh Brown 24-yard field goal, 7:51. Bengals 10–0. **Drive: 4 plays, 5 yards, 1:59.**

**Second quarter**

- PHI – Riley Cooper 11-yard pass from Nick Foles (Alex Henery kick), 11:40. Bengals 10–7. **Drive: 4 plays, 64 yards, 1:38.**
- PHI – Alex Henery 22-yard field goal, 7:37. Tied 10–10. **Drive: 8 plays, 26 yards, 2:04.**
- PHI – Alex Henery 20-yard field goal, 0:17. Eagles 13–10. **Drive: 7 plays, 11 yards, 1:35.**

**Third quarter**

- CIN – Andy Dalton 11-yard run (Josh Brown kick), 1:10. Bengals 17–13. **Drive: 8 plays, 40 yards, 4:34.**
- CIN – Wallace Gilberry 25-yard fumble return (Josh Brown kick), 0:21. Bengals 24–13.

**Fourth quarter**

- CIN – Josh Brown 32-yard field goal, 14:12. Bengals 27–13. **Drive: 4 plays, -1 yards, 0:53.**
- CIN – A. J. Green 5-yard pass from Andy Dalton (Josh Brown kick), 12:47. Bengals 34–13. **Drive: 5 plays, 33 yards, 1:25.**

**Top passers**

- CIN – Andy Dalton – 13/27, 127 yards, TD
- PHI – Nick Foles – 16/33, 180 yards, TD, INT

**Top rushers**

- CIN – BenJarvus Green-Ellis – 25 rushes, 106 yards, TD
- PHI – Bryce Brown – 16 rushes, 34 yards

**Top receivers**

- CIN – Jermaine Gresham – 6 receptions, 63 yards
- PHI – Jeremy Maclin – 4 receptions, 73 yards

The Bengals improved to 8–6 by winning in Philadelphia on Thursday Night Football, thus securing their second consecutive non-losing season for the first time since 2003–2006. Cincinnati is now 2–0 at Lincoln Financial Field and hopes to secure a second straight playoff appearance by beating the Steelers (7–7) on the other side of Pennsylvania in Week 16.

==== Week 16: at Pittsburgh Steelers ====
Week Sixteen: Cincinnati Bengals at Pittsburgh Steelers – Game summary

Quarter	1	2	3	4	Total
**Bengals**	7	3	0	3	**13**
Steelers	0	7	3	0	**10**

at Heinz Field, Pittsburgh, Pennsylvania

- Date: December 23
- Game time: 1:00 pm. EST
- Game weather: 35 °F (2 °C), sunny
- Game attendance: 63,236
- Referee: Mike Carey
- TV announcers (CBS): Jim Nantz and Phil Simms

Game information

**First quarter**

- CIN – Leon Hall 17-yard interception return (Josh Brown kick), 2:15. Bengals 7–0.

**Second quarter**

- CIN – Josh Brown 41-yard field goal, 1:53. Bengals 10–0. **Drive: 6 plays, 19 yards, 1:59.**
- PIT – Antonio Brown 60-yard pass from Ben Roethlisberger (Shaun Suisham kick), 1:09. Bengals 10–7. **Drive: 2 plays, 73 yards, 0:44.**

**Third quarter**

- PIT – Shaun Suisham 40-yard field goal, 4:01. Tied 10–10. **Drive: 10 plays, 45 yards, 5:07.**

**Fourth quarter**

- CIN – Josh Brown 43-yard field goal, 0:04. Bengals 13–10. **Drive: 2 plays, 21 yards, 0:10.**

**Top passers**

- CIN – Andy Dalton – 24/41, 278 yards, 2 INT
- PIT – Ben Roethlisberger – 14/28, 220 yards, TD, 2 INT

**Top rushers**

- CIN – BenJarvus Green-Ellis – 15 rushes, 14 yards
- PIT – Rashard Mendenhall – 11 rushes, 50 yards

**Top receivers**

- CIN – A. J. Green – 10 receptions, 116 yards
- PIT – Antonio Brown – 5 receptions, 97 yards, TD

With the victory over their hated rival in Western Pennsylvania, the Bengals increased their regular season record to 9–6 and finished 6–2 in road games, clinching a winning season and playoff spot for the third time in the last four seasons and also clinching consecutive winning seasons and playoff berths for the first time since 1981 and 1982 seasons. By improving to 5–7 at Heinz Field, Cincinnati defeated the Steelers for the first time since 2009 when they won the AFC North after going 6–0 against their three rivals. This was the first time since 1988 when the Bengals had a successful two-week road trip in Pennsylvania.

Due to the Ravens clinching the AFC North following a victory over the Giants a few hours later, the Bengals were assigned to one of the two wild card seeds along with the Indianapolis Colts (10–5). With the Colts' victory over the Chiefs that day, the Bengals were locked into the 6th seed since the Colts had a better record than them against common opponents (4–1 vs. 3–2).

==== Week 17: vs. Baltimore Ravens ====
Week Seventeen: Baltimore Ravens at Cincinnati Bengals – Game summary

Quarter	1	2	3	4	Total
Ravens	7	0	0	10	**17**
**Bengals**	0	7	6	10	**23**

at Paul Brown Stadium, Cincinnati, Ohio

- Date: December 30
- Game time: 1:00 pm. EST
- Game weather: 26 °F (−3 °C), partly cloudy
- Game attendance: 61,565
- Referee: Ron Winter
- TV announcers (CBS): Kevin Harlan and Solomon Wilcots

Game information

**First quarter**

- BAL – Anthony Allen 2-yard run (Justin Tucker kick), 0:17. Ravens 7–0. **Drive: 7 plays, 80 yards, 3:35.**

**Second quarter**

- CIN – Marvin Jones Jr. 11-yard pass from Andy Dalton (Josh Brown kick), 0:39. Tied 7–7. **Drive: 5 plays, 42 yards, 1:28.**

**Third quarter**

- CIN – Josh Brown 47-yard field goal, 6:15. Bengals 10–7. **Drive: 4 plays, 23 yards, 1:35.**
- CIN – Josh Brown 32-yard field goal, 2:24. Bengals 13–7. **Drive: 6 plays, 26 yards, 2:12.**

**Fourth quarter**

- BAL – Tyrod Taylor 1-yard run (Justin Tucker kick), 12:50. Ravens 14–13. **Drive: 11 plays, 81 yards, 4:34.**
- CIN – Josh Brown 38-yard field goal, 7:16. Bengals 16–14. **Drive: 5 plays, 45 yards, 1:38.**
- CIN – Carlos Dunlap 14-yard interception return (Josh Brown kick), 6:06. Bengals 23–14.
- BAL – Justin Tucker 49-yard field goal, 1:21. Bengals 23–17. **Drive: 14 plays, 46 yards, 4:45.**

**Top passers**

- BAL – Tyrod Taylor – 15/25, 149 yards, INT
- CIN – Andy Dalton – 10/15, 78 yards, TD

**Top rushers**

- BAL – Bernard Pierce – 22 rushes, 89 yards
- CIN – Brian Leonard – 10 rushes, 34 yards

**Top receivers**

- BAL – Ed Dickson – 6 receptions, 64 yards
- CIN – Brandon Tate – 3 receptions, 53 yards

After a tough road win over the Steelers, the Bengals returned home for a Week 17 duel against the Ravens. Quarterback Andy Dalton left the game to rest up for the playoffs in the second half after completing 10 passes in 15 attempts for 78 yards and one touchdown. The Bengals were able to snap their 4-game losing streak against the Ravens and finish their season 10–6. And with the Patriots and Broncos' wins and the Texans' loss, the Bengals traveled to Houston to take on the #3 seeded Texans in the playoffs.

== Standings ==
AFC North
	W	L	T	PCT	DIV	CONF	PF	PA	STK
^{(4)} Baltimore Ravens	10	6	0	.625	4–2	8–4	398	344	L1
^{(6)} Cincinnati Bengals	10	6	0	.625	3–3	7–5	391	320	W3
Pittsburgh Steelers	8	8	0	.500	3–3	5–7	336	314	W1
Cleveland Browns	5	11	0	.313	2–4	5–7	302	368	L3

== Postseason ==
=== Schedule ===
Round	Date	Opponent (seed)	Result	Record	Venue	Recap
Wild Card	January 5, 2013	at Houston Texans (3)	L 13–19	0–1	Reliant Stadium	Recap

=== Game summaries ===
==== AFC Wild Card Playoffs: at (3) Houston Texans ====
AFC Wild Card Playoffs: (6) Cincinnati Bengals at (3) Houston Texans – Game summary

Quarter	1	2	3	4	Total
Bengals	0	7	3	3	13
Texans	3	6	7	3	19

at Reliant Stadium, Houston, Texas

- Date: January 5, 2013
- Game time: 4:30 p.m. EST/3:30 p.m. CST
- Game weather: Played indoors (retractable roof closed)
- Game attendance: 71,738
- Referee: Alberto Riveron
- TV announcers (NBC): Dan Hicks, Mike Mayock and Alex Flanagan

Game information

First quarter

- HOU – Shayne Graham 48-yard field goal, 7:49. Texans 3–0. Drive: 9 plays, 65 yards, 4:19.

Second quarter

- HOU – Shayne Graham 27-yard field goal, 13:07. Texans 6–0. Drive: 12 plays, 60 yards, 7:05.
- CIN – Leon Hall 21-yard interception return (Josh Brown kick), 9:30. Bengals 7–6.
- HOU – Shayne Graham 22-yard field goal, 2:19. Texans 9–7. Drive: 13 plays, 76 yards, 7:11.

Third quarter

- HOU – Arian Foster 1-yard run (Shayne Graham kick), 10:31. Texans 16–7. Drive: 6 plays, 51 yards, 3:20.
- CIN – Josh Brown 34-yard field goal, 7:48. Texans 16–10. Drive: 7 plays, 64 yards, 2:43.

Fourth quarter

- HOU – Shayne Graham 24-yard field goal, 14:17. Texans 19–10. Drive: 8 plays, 20 yards, 3:49.
- CIN – Josh Brown 47-yard field goal, 9:03. Texans 19–13. Drive: 10 plays, 32 yards, 5:14.

Top passers

- CIN – Andy Dalton – 14/30, 127 yards, INT
- HOU – Matt Schaub – 29/38, 262 yards, INT

Top rushers

- CIN – BenJarvus Green-Ellis – 11 rushes, 63 yards
- HOU – Arian Foster – 32 rushes, 140 yards, TD

Top receivers

- CIN – A. J. Green – 5 receptions, 80 yards
- HOU – Owen Daniels – 9 receptions, 91 yards

The #6 seed Bengals traveled to Houston to take on the #3 seeded Texans in a defensive showdown. However, the Bengals lost in the playoffs for the second straight year while at the same time losing their fifth straight playoff game dating to 1991, ending their season with an overall record of 10–7 and dropped to 0–4 under Marvin Lewis in the playoffs.

== Statistics ==
=== Team leaders ===
	Player(s)	Value
Passing yards	Andy Dalton	3669 Yards
Passing touchdowns	Andy Dalton	27 TDs
Rushing yards	BenJarvus Green-Ellis	1094 Yards
Rushing touchdowns	BenJarvus Green-Ellis	6 TDs
Receiving yards	A. J. Green	1350 Yards
Receiving touchdowns	A. J. Green	11 TDs
Points	Mike Nugent	92 Points
Kickoff Return Yards	Brandon Tate	622 Yards
Punt return Yards	Adam Jones	275 Yards
Tackles	Vontaze Burfict	127 Tackles
Sacks	Geno Atkins	12.5 Sacks
Interceptions	Chris Crocker	3 INTs

Stats values are correct through Week 14.

=== League rankings ===
- Total Offense (YPG): 356.8 (15th)
- Passing (YPG): 242 (13th)
- Rushing (YPG): 115.1 (T-13th)
- Total Defense (YPG): 331.3 (8th)
- Passing (YPG): 221 (11th)
- Rushing (YPG): 110.3 (11th)

Stats correct through week 14.
