= Geno Atkins =

American football player (born 1988)

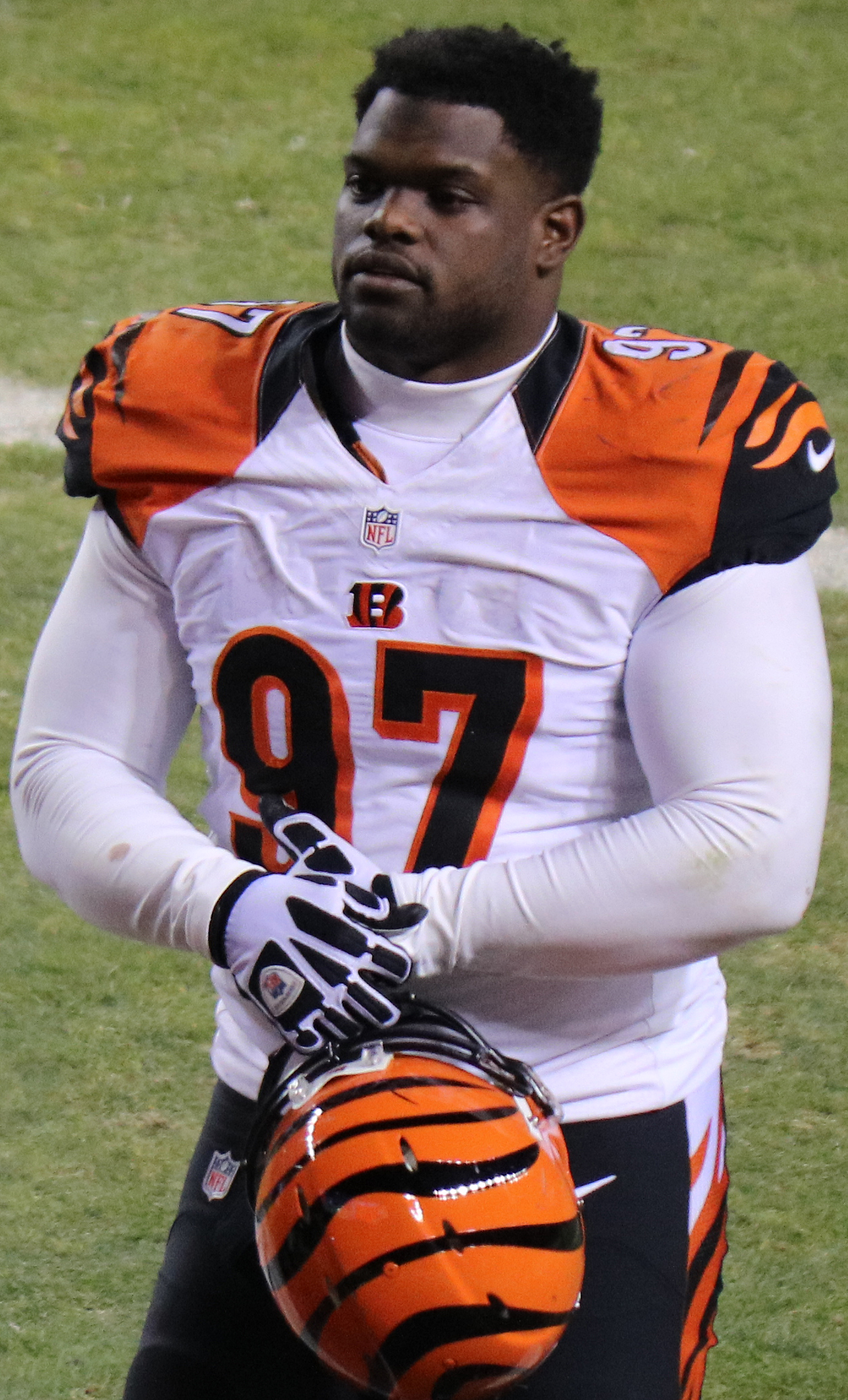
- Atkins with the Cincinnati Bengals in 2015

No. 97
- Position: Defensive tackle

Personal information
- Born: March 28, 1988 (age 38); Pembroke Pines, Florida, U.S.
- Listed height: 6 ft 1 in (1.85 m)
- Listed weight: 300 lb (136 kg)

Career information
- High school: St. Thomas Aquinas (Fort Lauderdale, Florida)
- College: Georgia (2006–2009)
- NFL draft: 2010: 4th round, 120th overall pick

Career history
- Cincinnati Bengals (2010–2020)

Awards and highlights
- 2× First-team All-Pro (2012, 2015); Second-team All-Pro (2011); 8× Pro Bowl (2011, 2012, 2014–2019); NFL 2010s All-Decade Team; First-team All-SEC (2007); Second-team All-SEC (2009)

Career NFL statistics
- Tackles: 384
- Sacks: 75.5
- Safeties: 1
- Forced fumbles: 8
- Fumble recoveries: 2
- Pass deflections: 6
- Defensive touchdowns: 1
- Stats at Pro Football Reference

Gene Reynard Atkins Jr. (born March 28, 1988) is an American former professional football player who was a defensive tackle in the National Football League (NFL). He played college football for the Georgia Bulldogs, and was selected by the Cincinnati Bengals in the fourth round of the 2010 NFL draft. Atkins was selected as a first-team All-Pro two times and is also an eight-time Pro Bowler.

== Early life ==
Atkins was born in Pembroke Pines, Florida, on March 28, 1988. He attended St. Thomas Aquinas in Fort Lauderdale and helped his high school football team to be the Class 5A runners-up in both 2004 and 2005. As a junior at St. Thomas Aquinas in 2004, Atkins had 70 tackles (12 resulted in lost yardage), one interception, and four fumble recoveries. In 2005, during his senior season, he had 117 tackles, 7.5 sacks, four forced fumbles, and two fumble recoveries. Following the season, he was named first-team all-county by the Sun-Sentinel and Miami Herald, first-team Class 5A in the state of Florida and was also named Florida Class 5A Defensive Player of the Year. Coming out of high school, he was rated as the 24th best defensive end in the nation by Rivals.com and 41st best by Scout.com.

In track & field, Atkins was one of the state's top performers in the throwing events. In the discus, he got a PR of 48.35 meters at the 2006 FHSAA 3A Region 4, placing 2nd in the finals. At the 2006 FHSAA 3A-4A Outdoor State Finals, he tied for 1st place in the shot put event, recording a top-throw of 18.01 meters.

== College career ==
Atkins enrolled in the University of Georgia, where he played for coach Mark Richt's Georgia Bulldogs football team from 2006 to 2009. He played as a true freshman, recording nine tackles and 0.5 sacks in 11 games.

In 2007, Atkins saw significant playing time as a backup behind Kade Weston and Jeff Owens. On September 21, Owens said of Atkins's impact, "Geno is doing a heck of a job. He's contributing a lot to the defense. He's leading the defensive line in tackles for loss and I think we're tied in tackles." As of September 29, despite being a backup, Atkins was fourth in the Southeastern Conference (SEC) with six tackles for losses along with a sack. On October 6, Atkins was named the starter over Weston and in only his second game led the team in tackles against Vanderbilt. He became the first defensive tackle to lead the team in tackles in a game since Jason Ferguson did so in 1995 and the first defensive lineman since David Pollack in 2003. Following a game against Kentucky in which he had five tackles, he was named SEC defensive player of the week for the week of November 17. Following, his sophomore season Atkins was named First-team All-SEC, and was the only player for Georgia other than running back Knowshon Moreno to be named to the team.

During the press conference for Hawaii's quarterback Colt Brennan before the Sugar Bowl, Atkins asked for an autograph and took a photo with Brennan. Fellow Georgia defensive lineman Marcus Howard said of Atkins's antics during the press conference, "He was like acting like a groupie. All of us gave him grief for that." Despite getting Brennan's autograph before the game, Atkins sacked him in the fourth quarter, forcing him out of the game.

Two games into the 2008 season, Atkins already had eight tackles and nine quarterback hurries. After the defense as a whole sacked Heisman Trophy winner Tim Tebow of Florida six times, Atkins said, "I think we rattled Tim Tebow and the offense. We wanted to pressure him. No one really works that well under pressure, not even the greatest quarterbacks. You put a little pressure on them, they're bound to flinch." On November 14 against Auburn, Atkins came in on offense and was the lead blocker for Matthew Stafford on a quarterback sneak. In the Capital One Bowl on January 2, 2009, against Michigan State, Atkins had one tackle and two quarterback hurries.

In 2009, Atkins was listed at No. 5 on Rivals.com's preseason defensive tackle power ranking. He was also named to the 2009 Outland Trophy watch list. In his three years after his freshman season, Atkins racked up 33 sacks, including 15 as a sophomore and 10.5 as a senior.

== Professional career ==
External videos
- Geno Atkins' NFL Combine workout

Pre-draft measurables
| Height | Weight | Arm length | Hand span | 40-yard dash | 10-yard split | 20-yard split | 20-yard shuttle | Three-cone drill | Vertical jump | Broad jump | Bench press |
|---|---|---|---|---|---|---|---|---|---|---|---|
| 6 ft 1 3/8 in (1.86 m) | 293 lb (133 kg) | 32 in (0.81 m) | 9 5/8 in (0.24 m) | 4.85 s | 1.75 s | 2.86 s | 4.43 s | 7.33 s | 33 in (0.84 m) | 9 ft 9 in (2.97 m) | 34 reps |
All values from NFL Combine

=== 2010 ===
The Cincinnati Bengals selected Atkins in the fourth round (120th overall) of the 2010 NFL draft. He was the 12th defensive tackle selected in 2010.

On July 16, 2010, the Cincinnati Bengals signed Atkins to a four-year, US$3.20 million contract that includes a signing bonus of $472,450.

Throughout training camp, he competed against Jonathan Fanene and Pat Sims for the job as the backup defensive tackle. Head coach Marvin Lewis named Atkins the fourth defensive tackle on the depth chart to start the regular season, behind Domata Peko, Tank Johnson, and Pat Sims.

He made his professional regular season debut during the Cincinnati Bengals' season-opening 38–24 loss at the New England Patriots. The following week, he had one assisted tackle and made his first career sack with teammate Michael Johnson in the Bengals' 15–10 victory over the Baltimore Ravens. Atkins and Johnson sacked Joe Flacco for a four-yard loss in the fourth quarter. On November 14, 2010, Atkins recorded a season-high three combined tackles and a half a sack during a 23–17 loss at the Indianapolis Colts. In Week 14, Atkins earned his first career start during a 23–7 loss at the Pittsburgh Steelers. The following week, Atkins collected two combined tackles and made his first career solo sack on quarterback Colt McCoy in their 19–17 win against the Cleveland Browns. He finished his rookie season with 16 combined tackles (ten solo), three sacks, and a pass deflection in 16 games and one start.

=== 2011 ===
Atkins competed for the job as the starting defensive tackle against Tank Johnson in training camp. He received the opportunity after Pat Sims missed training camp and the majority of the preseason after sustaining a knee injury. Defensive coordinator Mike Zimmer decided to name Atkins and Domata Peko the starting defensive tackles after the Bengals opted to release Tank Johnson on August 16, 2011.

He started the Cincinnati Bengals' season-opener at the Cleveland Browns and collected five combined tackles and broke up a pass in their 27–17 victory. On November 20, 2011, Atkins recorded a season-high six combined tackles and a sack in the Bengals' 31–24 loss at the Baltimore Ravens. Atkins finished his second season with a total of 47 combined tackles (26 solo), 7.5 sacks, two pass deflections, and two forced fumbles in 16 games and 15 starts. He led the Bengals with 7.5 sacks and tied Oakland Raiders' Tommy Kelly for the most sacks by a defensive tackle in 2011. Atkins was selected to the 2012 Pro Bowl as an alternate. He was officially named to his first Pro Bowl after New England Patriots' Vince Wilfork was unable to participate due to his appearance in Super Bowl XLVI.

The Cincinnati Bengals received a wildcard berth after finishing third in the AFC North with a 9–7 record. On January 7, 2012, Atkins started his first career playoff game and made four combined tackles and a sack on quarterback Matt Schaub as the Bengals lost 31–10 to the Houston Texans in the AFC Wild Card Round.

=== 2012 ===
Atkins returned as the starting defensive tackle alongside Domata Peko to start the season. He recorded a two-sack game in Week 1 against the Baltimore Ravens. In Week 4, he recorded three solo tackles and sacked quarterback Blaine Gabbert twice during a 27–10 victory at the Jacksonville Jaguars. On November 18, 2012, Atkins collected a season-high six solo tackles, deflected a pass, a sack, and forced two fumbles in the Bengals' 28–6 win at the Kansas City Chiefs. On December 23, 2012, Atkins tied his season-high of six combined tackles, forced a fumble, and sacked Pittsburgh Steelers' quarterback Ben Roethlisberger twice in their 13–10 victory. He earned AFC Defensive Player of the Week for his game against Pittsburgh. On December 26, 2012, it was announced that Atkins was voted to the 2013 Pro Bowl and received the second most votes of any defensive tackle in 2012. In the 2012 season, Atkins recorded 12.5 sacks, 54 total tackles (39 solo), two passes defended, and four forced fumbles. His 12.5 sacks ranked tied for sixth in the NFL with Charles Johnson. He earned first team All-Pro honors. He was ranked 36th by his fellow players on the NFL Top 100 Players of 2013.

=== 2013 ===
On September 2, 2013, the Cincinnati Bengals signed Atkins to a five-year, $53.32 million contract that includes a $15 million signing bonus.

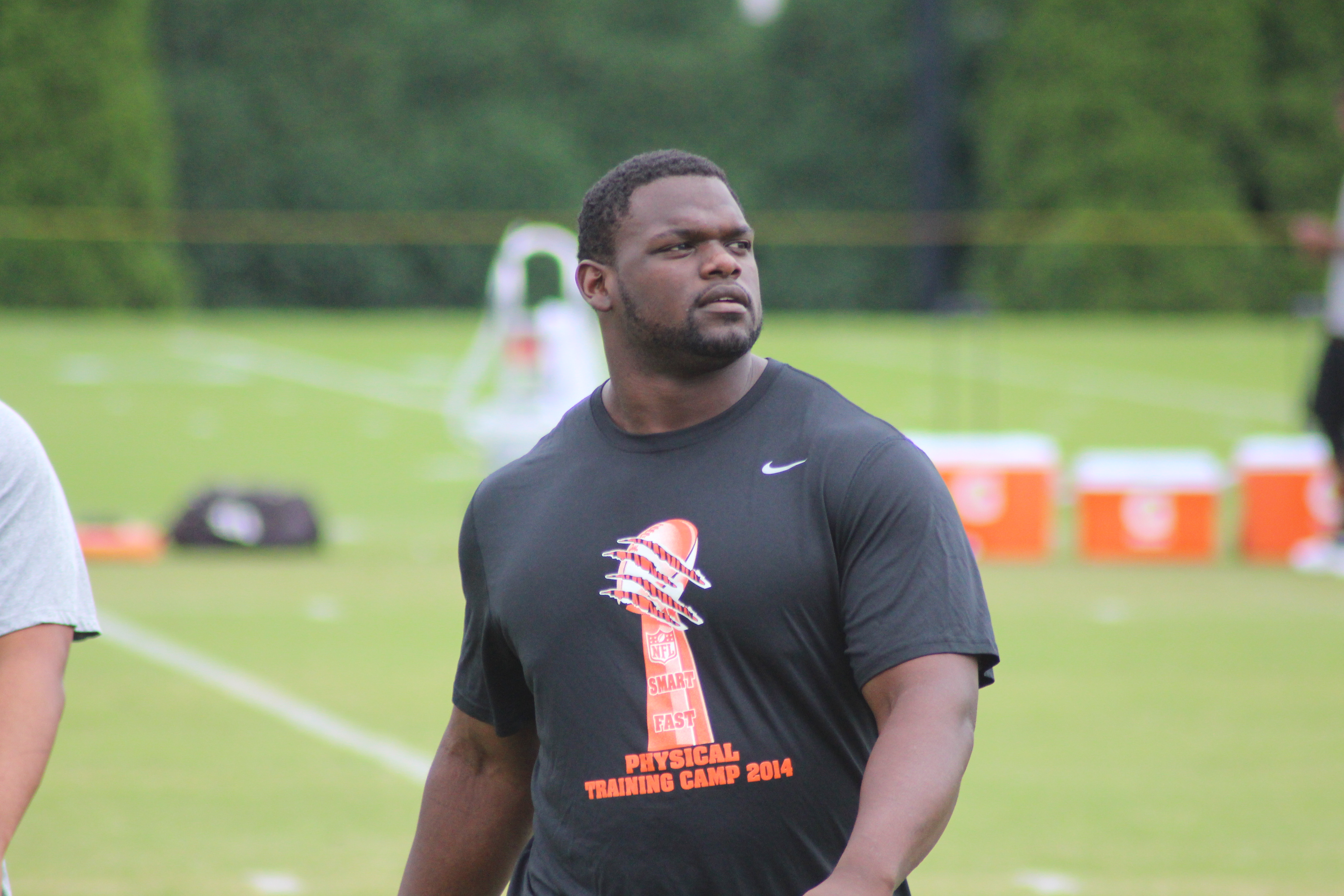
Atkins at Bengals training camp in 2014

On September 29, 2013, Atkins recorded three combined tackles and a season-high 1.5 sacks during a 17–6 loss at the Cleveland Browns. In Week 6, he made a season-high six combined and a half a sack in the Bengals' 27–24 victory at the Buffalo Bills. On October 31, 2013, Atkins recorded two solo tackles and a sack in the Bengals' 22–20 overtime loss at the Miami Dolphins on Thursday Night Football. He left in the second quarter after sustaining an injury to his leg. On November 1, 2013, the Bengals placed him on injured reserve for the remainder of the season after it was discovered he would have to undergo surgery to repair his torn ACL. He finished the 2013 season with 20 combined tackles (nine solo) and six sacks in nine games and nine starts. He was ranked 48th by his fellow players on the NFL Top 100 Players of 2014.

=== 2014 ===
Assistant coach Paul Guenther was hired to replace Mike Zimmer at defensive coordinator after he departed to accept the head coaching position with the Minnesota Vikings. Guenther retained Atkins and Peko as the starters at defensive tackle to begin the regular season.

In Week 9, he recorded a season-high six combined tackles and deflected a pass during a 33–23 victory over the Jacksonville Jaguars. On November 23, 2014, Atkins made two solo tackles and recorded his first career safety on running back Alfred Blue as the Bengals defeated the Houston Texans 22–13. Atkins finished the season with 34 combined tackles (20 solo), three sacks, a pass deflection, and a safety in 16 games and 16 starts. He was voted as an alternate for the 2015 Pro Bowl. On January 16, 2015, it was announced that Atkins would replace Detroit Lions' defensive tackle Ndamukong Suh in the Pro Bowl due to an injury.

=== 2015 ===
In Week 11, Atkins recorded a season-high four solo tackles and a sack during a 34–31 loss at the Arizona Cardinals. On December 20, 2015, he collected four solo tackles and made a season-high two sacks on San Francisco 49ers' quarterback Colin Kaepernick in their 24–14 victory. He finished the 2015 season with 42 combined tackles (31 solo) and a career-high 11 sacks in 16 games and 16 starts. On December 20, 2015, the NFL announced that Atkins had been voted to the 2016 Pro Bowl for the second consecutive year. He was selected as a player captain along with Devonta Freeman, Aaron Donald, and Odell Beckham Jr. The Cincinnati Bengals finished first in the AFC North with a 12–4 record and secured home field advantage. On January 9, 2016, Atkins recorded three solo tackles and sacked quarterback Ben Roethlisberger in the Bengals' 18–16 AFC Wild Card Round loss to the Pittsburgh Steelers. Atkins was ranked 29th on the NFL Top 100 Players of 2016.

=== 2016 ===
Head coach Marvin Lewis named Atkins and Domata Peko the starting defensive tackles for the sixth consecutive season. On December 11, 2016, he collected a season-high six combined tackles and sacked quarterback Robert Griffin III three times in the Bengals' 23–10 victory at the Cleveland Browns. He was named AFC Defensive Player of the Week for his game against the Browns. He finished the 2016 season with 32 combined tackles (21 solo) and nine sacks in 16 games and 16 starts. On December 20, 2016, it was announced that Atkins was voted to the 2017 Pro Bowl, along with teammate A. J. Green. He was ranked 68th by his fellow players on the NFL Top 100 Players of 2017. Pro Football Focus gave Atkins the sixth highest overall grade of all qualifying interior defensive linemen in 2016.

=== 2017 ===
Atkins was named the starting defensive tackle, along with Pat Sims who replaced Domata Peko after he departed for the Denver Broncos in free agency. He started the Cincinnati Bengals' season-opener against the Baltimore Ravens and recorded a career-high seven combined tackles and sacked Joe Flacco during a 20–0 loss. The next week, Atkins collected five combined tackles and a season-high two sacks on quarterback Deshaun Watson during a 13–9 loss to the Houston Texans. On December 17, 2017, he made four combined tackles and tied his season-high of two sacks in the Bengals' 34–7 loss at the Minnesota Vikings. On December 19, 2017, Atkins was named to his sixth Pro Bowl. He finished his eighth season in 2017 with 46 combined tackles (29 solo) and nine sacks in 16 games and 16 starts. Atkins was ranked 63rd by his fellow players on the NFL Top 100 Players of 2018.

=== 2018 ===
On August 28, 2018, Atkins signed a four-year, $65.3 million contract extension with the Bengals through the 2022 season. After recording a sack in the season-opener against the Indianapolis Colts, he sacked Joe Flacco twice the next week against the Baltimore Ravens on September 13. In week 15 against the Oakland Raiders, Atkins sacked Derek Carr three times in a 30–16 win. He finished the 2018 season with ten sacks and 45 total tackles (24 solo). He was named to his seventh Pro Bowl. He was ranked 79th by his fellow players on the NFL Top 100 Players of 2019.

=== 2019 ===
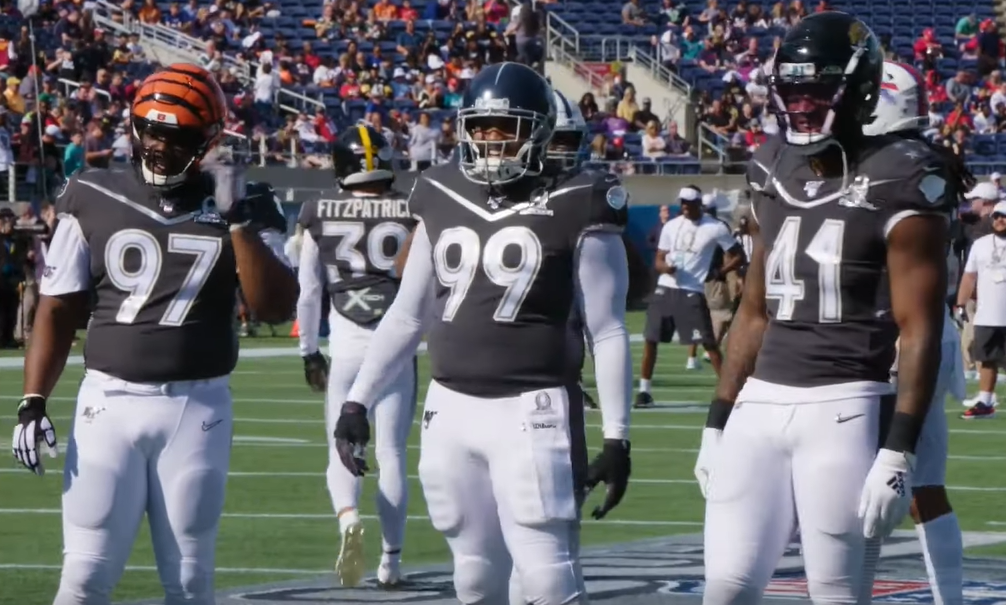
Atkins alongside Jurrell Casey at the 2020 Pro Bowl

In week 3 against the Buffalo Bills, Atkins recorded his first sack of the season on Josh Allen in the 21–17 loss. In week 7 against the Jacksonville Jaguars, Atkins sacked Gardner Minshew twice in the 27–17 loss. He finished the 2019 season with 4.5 sacks and 47 total tackles (18 solo). He was named to his eighth Pro Bowl. He was named to the Pro Football Hall of Fame All-2010s team.

=== 2020 ===
On December 16, 2020, Atkins was placed on injured reserve after undergoing shoulder surgery, an injury he had since training camp. He finished the season with only one tackle through eight games.

He was released on March 19, 2021.

== NFL career statistics ==
| Year | Team | Games | | Tackles | | | | | Interceptions | | | | Fumbles | | | |
| Year | Team | GP | GS | Cmb | Solo | Ast | Sck | Sfty | PD | Int | Yds | TD | FF | FR | Yds | TD |
|---|---|---|---|---|---|---|---|---|---|---|---|---|---|---|---|---|
| 2010 | CIN | 16 | 1 | 16 | 10 | 6 | 3.0 | 0 | 1 | 0 | 0 | 0 | 0 | 0 | 0 | 0 |
| 2011 | CIN | 16 | 15 | 47 | 26 | 21 | 7.5 | 0 | 2 | 0 | 0 | 0 | 2 | 2 | 19 | 1 |
| 2012 | CIN | 16 | 16 | 54 | 39 | 15 | 12.5 | 0 | 2 | 0 | 0 | 0 | 4 | 0 | 0 | 0 |
| 2013 | CIN | 9 | 9 | 20 | 9 | 11 | 6.0 | 0 | 0 | 0 | 0 | 0 | 0 | 0 | 0 | 0 |
| 2014 | CIN | 16 | 16 | 34 | 20 | 14 | 3.0 | 1 | 1 | 0 | 0 | 0 | 1 | 0 | 0 | 0 |
| 2015 | CIN | 16 | 16 | 42 | 31 | 11 | 11.0 | 0 | 0 | 0 | 0 | 0 | 1 | 0 | 0 | 0 |
| 2016 | CIN | 16 | 16 | 32 | 21 | 11 | 9.0 | 0 | 0 | 0 | 0 | 0 | 0 | 0 | 0 | 0 |
| 2017 | CIN | 16 | 15 | 46 | 29 | 17 | 9.0 | 0 | 0 | 0 | 0 | 0 | 0 | 0 | 0 | 0 |
| 2018 | CIN | 16 | 16 | 45 | 24 | 21 | 10.0 | 0 | 0 | 0 | 0 | 0 | 0 | 0 | 0 | 0 |
| 2019 | CIN | 16 | 14 | 47 | 18 | 29 | 4.5 | 0 | 0 | 0 | 0 | 0 | 0 | 0 | 0 | 0 |
| 2020 | CIN | 8 | 0 | 1 | 1 | 0 | 0.0 | 0 | 0 | 0 | 0 | 0 | 0 | 0 | 0 | 0 |
| Total | | 161 | 134 | 384 | 228 | 156 | 75.5 | 1 | 6 | 0 | 0 | 0 | 8 | 2 | 19 | 1 |

== Personal life ==
Atkins married his college sweetheart, Kristen Merritt, on June 25, 2016, at the St. Regis hotel in Buckhead, Atlanta.

During his freshman year at the University of Georgia, Atkins learned he has sickle cell trait.

Geno is the son of former NFL safety Gene Atkins.
