= Ryan Whalen =

American football player (born 1989)

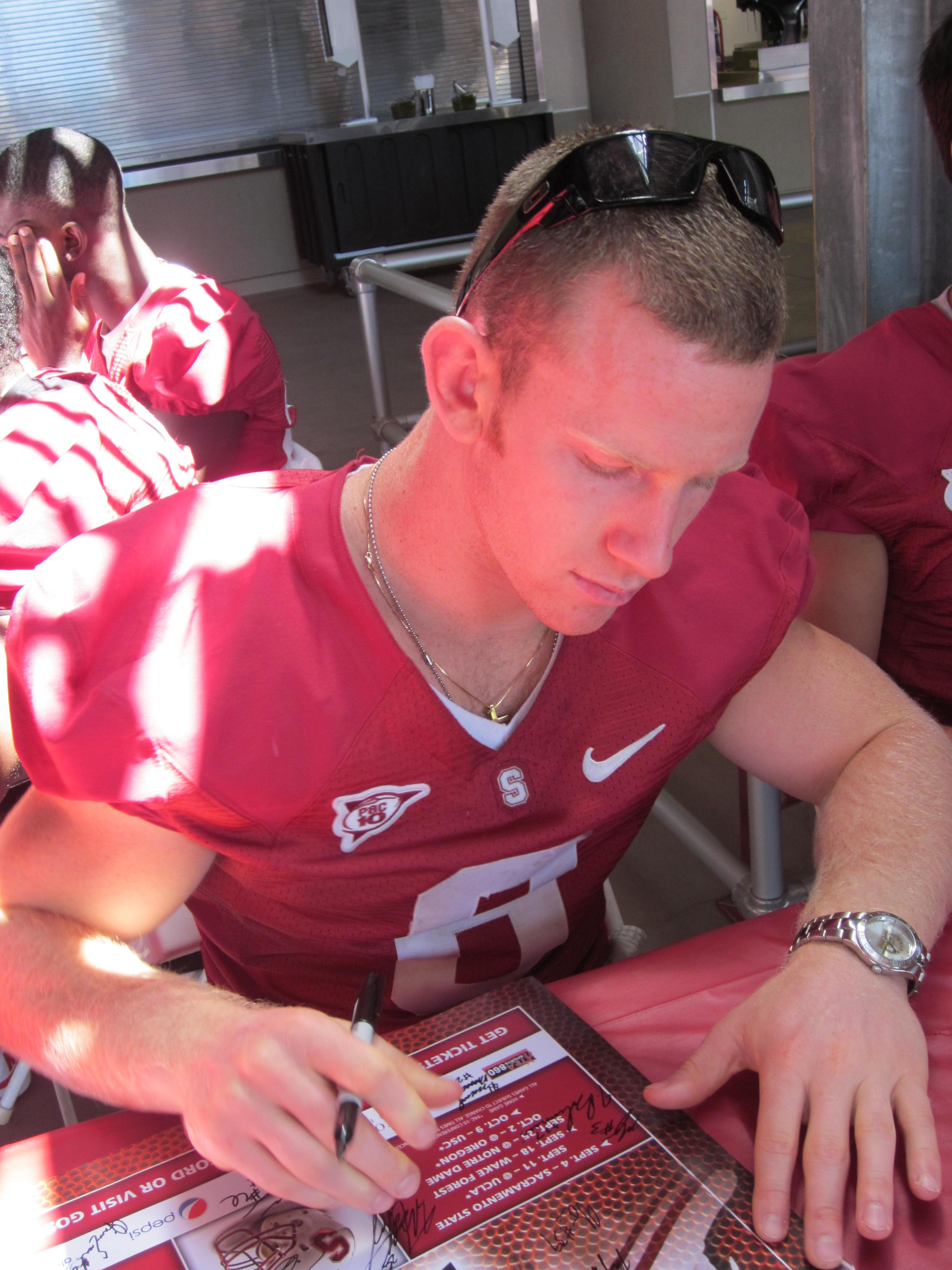
- Whalen during his tenure at Stanford in 2010

No. 88
- Position: Wide receiver

Personal information
- Born: July 26, 1989 (age 37); Alamo, California, U.S.
- Listed height: 6 ft 1 in (1.85 m)
- Listed weight: 200 lb (91 kg)

Career information
- High school: Monte Vista (Danville, California)
- College: Stanford
- NFL draft: 2011: 6th round, 167th overall pick

Career history
- Cincinnati Bengals (2011–2013); Minnesota Vikings (2015)*; San Francisco 49ers (2016)*
- * Offseason or practice squad member only

Career NFL statistics
- Receptions: 11
- Receiving yards: 80
- Stats at Pro Football Reference

Ryan Whalen (born July 26, 1989) is an American former professional football player who was a wide receiver in the National Football League (NFL). He played college football for the Stanford Cardinal. He was selected by the Cincinnati Bengals in the sixth round, 167th overall of the 2011 NFL draft.

== Early life ==
A native of Alamo, California, Whalen graduated from Monte Vista High School in Danville, California, where he played for former Santa Clara quarterback Craig Bergman. As a senior, he hauled in 80 passes for over 1,200 yards and scored 14 touchdowns playing wide receiver, earning all-state honors. He was also named first team all-county, all-East Bay, all-metro by the San Francisco Chronicle and was named Scholar-Athlete of the Year. Following his senior season, he was named by Cal-Hi Sports as one of the Top 10 football/basketball players in the state of California.

Whalen was also an all-state basketball player at Monte Vista. He earned East Bay Athletic League Player of the Year and first team all-Alameda County honors and also earned first team all-East Bay and second team all-Metro honors after leading his team to its first North Coast Section championship.

== College career ==
Whalen played at Stanford University for the Stanford Cardinal football team.

== Professional career ==
Pre-draft measurables
Height	Weight	Arm length	Hand span	Wingspan	40-yard dash	10-yard split	20-yard split	20-yard shuttle	Three-cone drill	Vertical jump	Broad jump	Bench press
6 ft 1 1/8 in (1.86 m)	202 lb (92 kg)	30 in (0.76 m)	9 in (0.23 m)	5 ft 11 5/8 in (1.82 m)	4.60 s	1.58 s	2.67 s	4.09 s	6.67 s	38.5 in (0.98 m)	10 ft 3 in (3.12 m)	18 reps
All values from NFL Combine

=== Cincinnati Bengals ===
Whalen was selected in the sixth round with the 167th overall pick of the 2011 NFL draft by the Cincinnati Bengals. He became the first Stanford wide receiver to be drafted since the Oakland Raiders selected Teyo Johnson in the second round of the 2003 NFL draft. Multiple news outlets, including Rotoworld.com and Bengals.com, reported that the Bengals had signed 167th overall pick WR Ryan Whalen on a four-year contract. The Bengals waived Whalen on August 25, 2014.

=== Minnesota Vikings ===
On August 2, 2015, Whalen joined the Minnesota Vikings as a free agent entering the 2015 season.

=== San Francisco 49ers ===
On August 23, 2016, Whalen was signed by the 49ers. On September 3, 2016, he was released by the 49ers.

== NFL career statistics ==
Year	Team	GP	Receiving						
Year	Team	GP	Rec	Tgts	Yds	Avg	Lng	TD	FD
2011	CIN	4	4	5	27	6.8	13	0	2
2012	CIN	9	7	12	53	7.6	10	0	3
Total		13	11	17	80	7.3	13	0	5
