= Andy Benoit =

American sportswriter

- Born: May 27, 1986 (age 40); Boise, Idaho, U.S.
- Education: The College of Idaho
- Occupation: Sports journalist
- Website: twitter.com/Andy_Benoit

Andrew Benoit (born May 27, 1986) is an American sportswriter for The 33rd Team, a website covering the National Football League. Previously, Benoit was assistant to the LA Rams head coach Sean McVay, overseeing special projects from 2021-2023. He was hired by The 33rd Team, in June 2023. Prior to his role with the Rams, he wrote for Sports Illustrated and for SI's NFL webpage, The MMQB and co-hosts The MMQB NFL Podcast.

Benoit has written for CBSSports.com, The New York Times, Football Outsiders, USA Today and Sports Network. He is the author of Andy Benoit's Touchdown: Everything You Need to Know about the NFL This Year, which was published by Random House through the years 2006–2007, and the co-author of Football Outsiders Almanac 2013: The Essential Guide to the 2013 NFL and College Football Seasons.

Benoit has been featured on the NFL Films Top 10 Shows series since 2010 and is a regular contributor to various television and radio programs, including ESPN, ABC and CBS. He is also a founder of NFLTouchdown.com.

== Personal life ==
Benoit is a graduate of The College of Idaho. He currently lives in Boise, Idaho. According to NFLTouchdown.com, Benoit started writing football books at the age of 14, and was dubbed by the Idaho Statesman as "The NFL Kid". Benoit's two cats, Mr. Fizzles and Othercat, have gained some notoriety as they have been mentioned by Peter King in several of his weekly articles.

In June 2015, Benoit was the subject of criticism after tweeting that "women's sports in general [are] not worth watching". The tweet has since been deleted and Benoit issued an apology, stating that "I got carried away responding to playful ribbing ... and in my stupidity, overcompensated by saying something ignorant and extreme. 100% mistake on my part, for which I'm deeply sorry." Benoit was criticized by outlets such as The Washington Post, The Chicago Tribune, and most notably, Late Night with Seth Meyers, on which comedians Seth Meyers and Amy Poehler resurrected their segment "Really?!?" from Saturday Night Live to ask Benoit to "say that to Serena Williams. Really".

== Related ==
- Peter King
- Sports Illustrated
