= Colin Cochart =

American football player (born 1987)

No. 81
- Position: Tight end

Personal information
- Born: July 7, 1987 (age 39); Kewaunee, Wisconsin
- Listed height: 6 ft 4 in (1.93 m)
- Listed weight: 254 lb (115 kg)

Career information
- High school: Kewaunee
- College: South Dakota State
- NFL draft: 2011: undrafted

Career history
- Cincinnati Bengals (2011); Dallas Cowboys (2012)

Career NFL statistics
- Receptions: 5
- Receiving yards: 44
- Receiving touchdowns: 1
- Stats at Pro Football Reference

Colin Cochart (born July 7, 1987) is an American former professional football player who was a tight end in the National Football League (NFL) for the Cincinnati Bengals and Dallas Cowboys. He was signed by the Cincinnati Bengals as an undrafted free agent in 2011. He played college football for the South Dakota State Jackrabbits.

== Early life and college ==
Cochart attended Kewanee High School in Wisconsin. As a senior, he tallied 44 receptions for 785 yards and 10 touchdowns. He received All-conference, All-state and Packerland Receiver of the Year honors.

He accepted a football scholarship from South Dakota State University. As a redshirt freshman, he appeared in all 11 games as a backup tight end and special teams player.

As a sophomore, he started 11 out of 12 games. Making 23 receptions (fifth on the team) ranked fifth on team with 23 receptions for 400 yards. As a junior, he ranked fourth on the team with 26 receptions and led the team with 5 receiving touchdowns.

== Professional career ==
=== Cincinnati Bengals ===
In 2011, he was signed by the Bengals as an undrafted free agent. He was active for 10 games (3 starts). He played mainly on special teams. He registered 5 receptions for 44 yards and one touchdown. On August 31, 2012, he was released after being passed on the depth chart by rookie tight end Orson Charles.

=== Dallas Cowboys ===
On September 1, 2012, Cochart was claimed off of waivers by the Dallas Cowboys, to provide depth while tight end Jason Witten recovered from a lacerated spleen injury. He was declared inactive for the first game. On September 11, he was released after Witten was able to play in the season opener against the New York Giants.

On January 7, 2013, he was re-signed by the Dallas Cowboys. He was released on August 27.
