= Brayden Coombs =

American football player and coach (born 1986)

Personal information
- Born: October 24, 1986 (age 40); Cincinnati, Ohio

Career information
- High school: Colerain High School
- College: Miami (Ohio)

Career history
- Cincinnati Bengals (2009) Coaching intern; Cincinnati Bengals (2010–2011) Coaching assistant; Cincinnati Bengals (2012–2018) Assistant special teams coach/quality control coach; Cincinnati Bengals (2019) Assistant special teams coach; Detroit Lions (2020) Special teams coordinator

Brayden Coombs (born October 24, 1986) is an American former football coach who was the special teams coordinator for the Detroit Lions of the National Football League (NFL). He spent his first 10 years coaching with the Cincinnati Bengals after playing in college for the Miami RedHawks. He had been one of the youngest coordinators in the NFL at age 34.

== Playing career ==
Coombs lettered four times as a defensive back and wide receiver at Miami (Ohio) University from 2005-2009.

== Coaching ==
On January 11, 2020, the Detroit Lions announced the hiring of Braydon Coombs as their special teams coordinator. On December 21, 2020, the Lions fired Brayden Coombs after he reportedly went rogue on a fake punt by calling the play without the knowledge or consent of interim head coach Darrell Bevell

== Family ==
Brayden and his wife have a daughter and two sons. He is the son of former Ohio State defensive coordinator Kerry Coombs.
