= DeQuin Evans =

American gridiron football player (born 1987)

No. 94
- Position: Defensive lineman

Personal information
- Born: May 17, 1987 (age 39); Long Beach, California, U.S.
- Listed height: 6 ft 3 in (1.91 m)
- Listed weight: 253 lb (115 kg)

Career information
- College: Los Angeles Harbor (2007–2008); Kentucky (2009–2010)
- NFL draft: 2011: undrafted

Career history
- Cincinnati Bengals (2011–2013)*; Calgary Stampeders (2014–2015); Montreal Alouettes (2016); BC Lions (2017)
- * Offseason or practice squad member only

Awards and highlights
- Grey Cup champion (2014)

Career CFL statistics
- Total tackles: 31
- Sacks: 5
- Stats at CFL.ca
- Stats at Pro Football Reference

DeQuin Lee Evans (born May 17, 1987) is an American former professional football defensive lineman. He played college football at Los Angeles Harbor College and Kentucky. He is married to Nova Scotian Olympic runner Jenna Martin-Evans.

== Early life ==
Evans grew up in Compton, California; many of his friends were gang members. He spent time in Camp Kilpatrick, a juvenile detention facility. While watching Gridiron Gang, a film based on Camp Kilpatrick, Evans saw his bed. Later, he worked at Albertsons, bagging groceries. His cousin, Hershel Dennis, a running back at USC, was instrumental in obtaining permission for Evans sit in on classes.

== College career ==
Evans enrolled at Los Angeles Harbor College and played there in 2007 and 2008. He transferred to Kentucky. Childhood friend and LAHC teammate Chris Matthews also transferred to Kentucky. He played for Kentucky in 2009 and 2010. He was a captain for Kentucky in 2010.

== Professional career ==
After going undrafted in the 2011 NFL draft, Evans signed with the Cincinnati Bengals. In November 2011, Evans was suspended for four games. On August 30, 2013, Evans was suspended for eight games. Cincinnati released Evans in November 2013.

Evans signed with the Calgary Stampeders in May 2014. He played in nine games (seven starts) during the 2014 campaign and was a part of the 102nd Grey Cup championship team.

He signed with the Montreal Alouettes on February 15, 2016 but suffered a torn foot tendon near the end of training camp and dressed for just five games that season.

He signed with the BC Lions on February 16, 2017.

== Other media ==
On the November 7, 2013, episode of Impact Wrestling, Evans and Bengals teammate and former TNA World Tag Team Champion Adam Jones, were sitting front row, and got into an "altercation" with Bad Influence (Christopher Daniels and Kazarian), who pushed both players, leading them to jump the guardrail and bodyslam both wrestlers in the ring.
