= 2013 Cincinnati Bengals season =

NFL team season

- Owner: Mike Brown
- Head coach: Marvin Lewis
- Offensive coordinator: Jay Gruden
- Defensive coordinator: Mike Zimmer
- Home stadium: Paul Brown Stadium

Results
- Record: 11–5
- Division place: 1st AFC North
- Playoffs: Lost Wild Card Playoffs (vs. Chargers) 10–27

Uniform
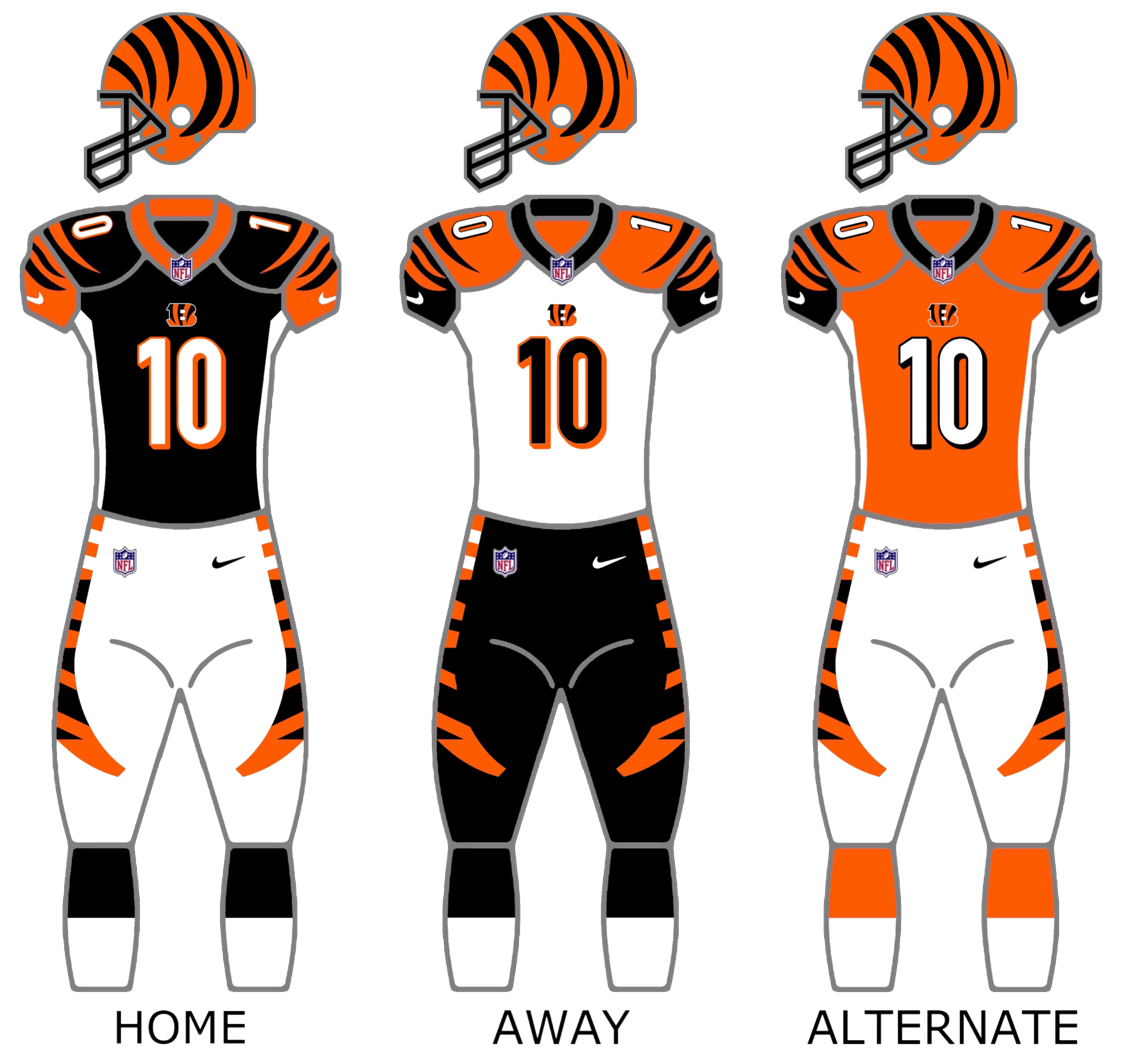

The 2013 season was the Cincinnati Bengals' 44th in the National Football League (NFL), their 46th overall and their 11th under head coach Marvin Lewis. The Bengals improved on their 10–6 regular season record from 2012 and clinched the AFC North division title. However, the Bengals lost 27–10 to the San Diego Chargers in the playoffs – the third consecutive season that the Bengals had lost in the Wild Card round. Their training camp was featured on the HBO show Hard Knocks.

== 2013 draft class ==
Round	Selection	Player	Position	College
1	21	Tyler Eifert	Tight end	Notre Dame
2	37^{[a]}	Giovani Bernard	Running back	North Carolina
2	53	Margus Hunt	Defensive end	SMU
3	84	Shawn Williams	Safety	Georgia
4	118	Sean Porter	Linebacker	Texas A&M
5	156	Tanner Hawkinson	Offensive tackle	Kansas
6	190	Rex Burkhead	Running back	Nebraska
6	197^{[b]}	Cobi Hamilton	Wide receiver	Arkansas
7^{[c]}	240^{[d]}	Reid Fragel	Offensive tackle	Ohio State
7^{[c]}	251^{[d]}	T. J. Johnson	Center	South Carolina

Notes

^{^[a]} The Bengals acquired this second-round selection as part of a 2011 trade that sent quarterback Carson Palmer to the Oakland Raiders.
^{^[b]} The Bengals acquired this sixth-round selection as part of a 2011 trade that sent wide receiver Chad Johnson to the New England Patriots.
^{^[c]} The Bengals traded their original seventh-round selection (No. 227 overall) to the San Francisco 49ers in exchange for safety Taylor Mays.
^{^[d]} Compensatory selection.

== Staff ==
2013 Cincinnati Bengals staff
Front office: President – Mike Brown; Senior vice president of player personnel – Pete Brown; Executive vice president – Katie Blackburn; Vice president of player personnel – Paul H. Brown; Director of player personnel – Duke Tobin; Head coaches: Head coach – Marvin Lewis; Assistant head coach/offensive line – Paul Alexander; Offensive coaches: Offensive coordinator – Jay Gruden; Quarterbacks – Ken Zampese; Running backs – Hue Jackson; Wide receivers – James Urban; Tight ends – Jonathan Hayes; Offensive assistant – Brayden Coombs; Offensive quality control/assistant offensive line – Kyle Caskey	Defensive coaches: Defensive coordinator – Mike Zimmer; Defensive line – Jay Hayes; Linebackers – Paul Guenther; Defensive backs – Mark Carrier; Assistant defensive backs – Adam Zimmer; Defensive quality control/assistant linebackers – David Lippincott; Special teams coaches: Special teams – Darrin Simmons; Strength and conditioning: Strength and conditioning – Chip Morton; Assistant strength and conditioning – Jeff Friday

== Final roster ==
2013 Cincinnati Bengals roster
Quarterbacks (QB): 14 Andy Dalton; 8 Josh Johnson; Running backs (RB): 25 Giovani Bernard; 33 Rex Burkhead; 42 BenJarvus Green-Ellis; 30 Cedric Peerman; Wide receivers (WR): 18 A. J. Green; 16 Andrew Hawkins; 82 Marvin Jones; 12 Mohamed Sanu; 11 Dane Sanzenbacher; 19 Brandon Tate; 88 Ryan Whalen; Tight ends (TE): 80 Orson Charles; 85 Tyler Eifert; 84 Jermaine Gresham; 81 Alex Smith	Offensive linemen (OL): 73 Anthony Collins T; 64 Kyle Cook C; 72 Tanner Hawkinson G/T; 67 Mike Pollak G; 66 Trevor Robinson C; 74 Dennis Roland T; 71 Andre Smith T; 77 Andrew Whitworth T/G; 68 Kevin Zeitler G; Defensive linemen (DL): 90 Christo Bilukidi DT; 96 Carlos Dunlap DE; 95 Wallace Gilberry DE; 99 Margus Hunt DE; 93 Michael Johnson DE; 94 Domata Peko DT; 75 Devon Still DT; 98 Brandon Thompson DT	Linebackers (LB): 53 Michael Boley OLB; 55 Vontaze Burfict OLB; 51 Jayson DiManche OLB; 92 James Harrison OLB; 58 Rey Maualuga MLB; 57 Vincent Rey MLB; 50 J. K. Schaffer MLB; Defensive backs (DB): 32 Chris Crocker SS; 21 Brandon Ghee CB; 43 George Iloka SS; 24 Adam Jones CB; 27 Dre Kirkpatrick CB; 37 Chris Lewis-Harris CB; 20 Reggie Nelson FS; 23 Terence Newman CB; 40 Shawn Williams FS; Special teams (ST): 46 Clark Harris LS; 3 Zoltán Meskó P; 2 Mike Nugent K	Practice squad: 44 Tony Dye S; 87 Cobi Hamilton WR; 60 T. J. Johnson C; 76 David King DE; 39 Onterio McCalebb CB; 7 Greg McElroy QB; 52 Bruce Taylor LB; 61 Scott Wedige C; Reserve: 97 Geno Atkins DT (IR); 63 Larry Black DT (IR); 65 Clint Boling G (IR); 91 Robert Geathers DE (IR); 29 Leon Hall CB (IR); 10 Kevin Huber P (IR); 49 Brandon Joiner OLB (IR); 59 Emmanuel Lamur OLB (IR); 26 Taylor Mays SS (IR); 56 Sean Porter OLB (IR); 5 Zac Robinson QB (PUP); Rookies in italics 53 active, 11 reserve, 8 practice squad

== Schedule ==
=== Preseason ===
Week	Date	Opponent	Result	Record	Venue	Recap
1	August 8	at Atlanta Falcons	**W** 34–10	1–0	Georgia Dome	Recap
2	August 17	Tennessee Titans	**W** 27–19	2–0	Paul Brown Stadium	Recap
3	August 24	at Dallas Cowboys	**L** 18–24	2–1	AT&T Stadium	Recap
4	August 29	Indianapolis Colts	**W** 27–10	3–1	Paul Brown Stadium	Recap

=== Regular season ===
Week	Date	Opponent	Result	Record	Venue	Recap
1	September 8	at Chicago Bears	**L** 21–24	0–1	Soldier Field	Recap
2	September 16	**Pittsburgh Steelers**	**W** 20–10	1–1	Paul Brown Stadium	Recap
3	September 22	Green Bay Packers	**W** 34–30	2–1	Paul Brown Stadium	Recap
4	September 29	at **Cleveland Browns**	**L** 6–17	2–2	FirstEnergy Stadium	Recap
5	October 6	New England Patriots	**W** 13–6	3–2	Paul Brown Stadium	Recap
6	October 13	at Buffalo Bills	**W** 27–24 (OT)	4–2	Ralph Wilson Stadium	Recap
7	October 20	at Detroit Lions	**W** 27–24	5–2	Ford Field	Recap
8	October 27	New York Jets	**W** 49–9	6–2	Paul Brown Stadium	Recap
9	October 31	at Miami Dolphins	**L** 20–22 (OT)	6–3	Sun Life Stadium	Recap
10	November 10	at **Baltimore Ravens**	**L** 17–20 (OT)	6–4	M&T Bank Stadium	Recap
11	November 17	**Cleveland Browns**	**W** 41–20	7–4	Paul Brown Stadium	Recap
12	Bye					
13	December 1	at San Diego Chargers	**W** 17–10	8–4	Qualcomm Stadium	Recap
14	December 8	Indianapolis Colts	**W** 42–28	9–4	Paul Brown Stadium	Recap
15	December 15	at **Pittsburgh Steelers**	**L** 20–30	9–5	Heinz Field	Recap
16	December 22	Minnesota Vikings	**W** 42–14	10–5	Paul Brown Stadium	Recap
17	December 29	**Baltimore Ravens**	**W** 34–17	11–5	Paul Brown Stadium	Recap

Note: Intra-division opponents are in bold text.

=== Postseason ===
Round	Date	Opponent (seed)	Result	Record	Venue	Recap
Wild Card	January 5, 2014	San Diego Chargers (6)	**L** 10–27	0–1	Paul Brown Stadium	Recap

== Game summaries ==
=== Regular season ===
==== Week 1: at Chicago Bears ====
Week One: Cincinnati Bengals at Chicago Bears – Game summary

Quarter	1	2	3	4	Total
Bengals	7	7	7	0	21
Bears	7	3	7	7	24

at Soldier Field, Chicago, Illinois

- Date: September 8
- Game time: 1:00 p.m. EDT/12:00 p.m. CDT
- Game weather: 73 °F (23 °C), cloudy
- Game attendance: 62,213
- Referee: Carl Cheffers
- TV announcers (CBS): Jim Nantz and Phil Simms
- Recap, Game book

Game information

First quarter

- CHI – Martellus Bennett 8-yard pass from Jay Cutler (Robbie Gould kick), 9:52. Bears 7–0. Drive: 7 plays, 36 yards, 3:10.
- CIN – A. J. Green 2-yard pass from Andy Dalton (Mike Nugent kick), 2:34. Tied 7–7. Drive: 9 plays, 97 yards, 4:17.

Second quarter

- CIN – A. J. Green 45-yard pass from Andy Dalton (Mike Nugent kick), 2:53. Bengals 14–7. Drive: 8 plays, 91 yards, 4:09.
- CHI – Robbie Gould 58-yard field goal, 0:11. Bengals 14–10. Drive: 4 plays, 4 yards, 0:31.

Third quarter

- CIN – BenJarvus Green-Ellis 5-yard run (Mike Nugent kick), 7:52. Bengals 21–10. Drive: 12 plays, 80 yards, 7:08.
- CHI – Matt Forte 1 yard run (Robbie Gould kick), 3:22. Bengals 21–17. Drive: 9 plays, 80 yards, 4:30.

Fourth quarter

- CHI – Brandon Marshall 19-yard pass from Jay Cutler (Robbie Gould kick), 7:58. Bears 24–21. Drive: 8 plays, 81 yards, 4:41.

Top passers

- CIN – Andy Dalton – 26/33, 282 yards, 2 TD, 2 INT
- CHI – Jay Cutler – 21/33, 242 yards, 2 TD, INT

Top rushers

- CIN – BenJarvus Green-Ellis – 14 rushes, 25 yards, TD
- CHI – Matt Forte – 19 rushes, 50 yards, TD

Top receivers

- CIN – A. J. Green – 9 receptions, 162 yards, 2 TD
- CHI – Brandon Marshall – 8 receptions, 104 yards, TD

The Bengals would build a 21–10 lead, but it would vanish as the Bears would rally to win.

With the loss, the Bengals started 0-1 for the second straight season.

==== Week 2: vs. Pittsburgh Steelers ====
Week Two: Pittsburgh Steelers at Cincinnati Bengals – Game summary

Quarter	1	2	3	4	Total
Steelers	3	7	0	0	10
Bengals	7	3	7	3	20

at Paul Brown Stadium, Cincinnati, Ohio

- Date: September 16
- Game time: 8:40 pm. EDT
- Game weather: 62 °F (17 °C), clear
- Game attendance: 64,585
- Referee: Mike Carey
- TV announcers (ESPN): Mike Tirico, Jon Gruden and Lisa Salters
- Recap, Game book

Game information

First quarter

- PIT – Shaun Suisham 44-yard field goal, 10:52. Steelers 3–0. Drive: 4 plays, 8 yards, 1:26.
- CIN – Giovani Bernard 7-yard run (Mike Nugent kick), 0:57. Bengals 7–3. Drive: 5 plays, 87 yards, 1:45.

Second quarter

- CIN – Mike Nugent 41-yard field goal, 13:16. Bengals 10–3. Drive: 8 plays, 35 yards, 1:45.
- PIT – Derek Moye 1-yard pass from Ben Roethlisberger (Shaun Suisham kick), 1:54. Tied 10–10. Drive: 5 plays, 65 yards, 2:19.

Third quarter

- CIN – Giovani Bernard 27-yard pass from Andy Dalton (Mike Nugent kick), 6:08. Bengals 17–10. Drive: 8 plays, 78 yards, 5:08.

Fourth quarter

- CIN – Mike Nugent 25-yard field goal, 7:51. Bengals 20–10. Drive: 14 plays, 57 yards, 6:51.

Top passers

- PIT – Ben Roethlisberger – 20/37, 251 yards, TD, INT
- CIN – Andy Dalton – 25/45, 280 yards, TD

Top rushers

- PIT – Felix Jones – 10 rushes, 37 yards
- CIN – BenJarvus Green-Ellis – 22 rushes, 75 yards

Top receivers

- PIT – Emmanuel Sanders – 5 receptions, 78 yards
- CIN – Jermaine Gresham – 6 receptions, 66 yards

With their second straight victory over the Steelers, the Bengals went to 1-1, and beat the Steelers at home for the first time since 2009.

==== Week 3: vs. Green Bay Packers ====
Week Three: Green Bay Packers at Cincinnati Bengals – Game summary

Quarter	1	2	3	4	Total
Packers	0	16	14	0	30
Bengals	14	0	7	13	34

at Paul Brown Stadium, Cincinnati, Ohio

- Date: September 22
- Game time: 1:00 pm. EDT
- Game weather: 63 °F (17 °C), partly cloudy
- Game attendance: 64,633
- Referee: Clete Blakeman
- TV announcers (Fox): Joe Buck, Troy Aikman and Pam Oliver
- Recap, Game book

Game information

First quarter

- CIN – Giovani Bernard 3-yard run (Mike Nugent kick), 9:20. Bengals 7–0. Drive: 10 plays, 80 yards, 5:40.
- CIN – BenJarvus Green-Ellis 2-yard run (Mike Nugent kick), 9:08. Bengals 14–0. Drive: 1 play, 2 yards, 0:12.

Second quarter

- GB – Mason Crosby 41-yard field goal, 14:57. Bengals 14–3. Drive: 4 plays, 3 yards, 0:46.
- GB – MD Jennings 24-yard fumble return (Mason Crosby kick), 11:22. Bengals 14–10.
- GB – Mason Crosby 19-yard field goal, 6:32. Bengals 14–13. Drive: 7 plays, 20 yards, 3:11.
- GB – Mason Crosby 26-yard field goal, 0:00. Packers 16–14. Drive: 12 plays, 70 yards, 5:35.

Third quarter

- GB – Johnathan Franklin 2-yard run (Mason Crosby kick), 11:40. Packers 23–14. Drive: 9 plays, 80 yards, 3:20.
- GB – James Jones 7-yard pass from Aaron Rodgers (Mason Crosby kick), 5:30. Packers 30–14. Drive: 5 plays, 92 yards, 1:48.
- CIN – A. J. Green 20-yard pass from Andy Dalton (Mike Nugent kick), 3:50. Packers 30–21. Drive: 4 plays, 65 yards, 1:40.

Fourth quarter

- CIN – Marvin Jones Jr. 11-yard pass from Andy Dalton (kick failed), 10:55. Packers 30–27. Drive: 7 plays, 95 yards, 2:46.
- CIN – Terence Newman 58-yard fumble return (Mike Nugent kick), 3:47. Bengals 34–30.

Top passers

- GB – Aaron Rodgers – 26/43, 244 yards, TD, 2 INT
- CIN – Andy Dalton – 20/28, 235 yards, 2 TD, INT

Top rushers

- GB – Johnathan Franklin – 13 rushes, 103 yards, TD
- CIN – Giovani Bernard – 10 rushes, 50 yards, TD

Top receivers

- GB – Jordy Nelson – 8 receptions, 93 yards
- CIN – Mohamed Sanu – 4 receptions, 68 yards

The Bengals defeated the Green Bay Packers 34–30, and also became the first team in NFL history to lead by 14 points, then trail by 16 and eventually win.

==== Week 4: at Cleveland Browns ====
Week Four: Cincinnati Bengals at Cleveland Browns – Game summary

Quarter	1	2	3	4	Total
Bengals	0	3	3	0	6
Browns	7	0	3	7	17

at FirstEnergy Stadium, Cleveland, Ohio

- Date: September 29
- Game time: 1:00 pm. EDT
- Game weather: 68 °F (20 °C), cloudy
- Game attendance: 71,481
- Referee: Ron Winter
- TV announcers (CBS): Marv Albert and Rich Gannon
- Recap, Game book

Game information

First quarter

- CLE – Jordan Cameron 2-yard pass from Brian Hoyer (Billy Cundiff kick), 2:13. Browns 7–0. Drive: 12 plays, 95 yards, 6:29.

Second quarter

- CIN – Mike Nugent 25-yard field goal, 10:48. Browns 7–3. Drive: 13 plays, 46 yards, 6:25.

Third quarter'

- CLE – Billy Cundiff 51-yard field goal, 5:10. Browns 10–3. Drive: 10 plays, 17 yards, 3:25.
- CIN – Mike Nugent 43-yard field goal, 0:37. Browns 10–6. Drive: 10 plays, 62 yards, 4:33.

Fourth quarter

- CLE – Chris Ogbonnaya 1-yard pass from Brian Hoyer (Billy Cundiff kick), 4:54. Browns 17–6. Drive: 12 plays, 91 yards, 6:37.

Top passers

- CIN – Andy Dalton – 23/42, 206 yards, INT
- CLE – Brian Hoyer – 25/38, 269 yards, 2 TD

Top rushers

- CIN – Giovani Bernard – 10 rushes, 37 yards
- CLE – Willis McGahee – 15 rushes, 46 yards

Top receivers

- CIN – Jermaine Gresham – 3 receptions, 53 yards
- CLE – Jordan Cameron – 10 receptions, 91 yards, TD

With the loss, the Bengals fell to 2–2.

==== Week 5: vs. New England Patriots ====
Week Five: New England Patriots at Cincinnati Bengals – Game summary

Quarter	1	2	3	4	Total
Patriots	0	3	0	3	6
Bengals	0	3	3	7	13

at Paul Brown Stadium, Cincinnati, Ohio

- Date: October 6
- Game time: 1:00 pm. EDT
- Game weather: 68 °F (20 °C), cloudy
- Game attendance: 64,259
- Referee: Gene Steratore
- TV announcers (CBS): Greg Gumbel and Dan Dierdorf
- Recap, Game book

Game information

First quarter

- No scoring plays.

Second quarter

- CIN – Mike Nugent 39-yard field goal, 3:12. Bengals 3–0. Drive: 10 plays, 49 yards, 4:42.
- NE – Stephen Gostkowski 42-yard field goal, 0:08. Tied 3–3. Drive: 5 plays, 25 yards, 0:29.

Third quarter

- CIN – Mike Nugent 50-yard field goal, 5:43. Bengals 6–3. Drive: 13 plays, 59 yards, 6:17.

Fourth quarter

- CIN – BenJarvus Green-Ellis 1-yard run (Mike Nugent kick), 9:21. Bengals 13–3. Drive: 14 plays, 93 yards, 7:48.
- NE – Stephen Gostkowski 19-yard field goal, 6:28. Bengals 13–6. Drive: 7 plays, 75 yards, 2:53.

Top passers

- NE – Tom Brady – 18/38, 197 yards, INT
- CIN – Andy Dalton – 20/27, 212 yards, INT

Top rushers

- NE – LeGarrette Blount – 12 rushes, 51 yards
- CIN – BenJarvus Green-Ellis – 19 rushes, 67 yards, TD

Top receivers

- NE – Danny Amendola – 4 receptions, 55 yards
- CIN – A. J. Green – 5 receptions, 61 yards

With the win, the Bengals improved to 3–2 and defeated the Patriots for the first time since 2001. It was also their last victory against the Patriots during the Brady–Belichick era.

==== Week 6: at Buffalo Bills ====
Week Six: Cincinnati Bengals at Buffalo Bills – Game summary

Quarter	1	2	3	4	OT	Total
Bengals	10	7	7	0	3	27
Bills	7	3	0	14	0	24

at Ralph Wilson Stadium, Orchard Park, New York

- Date: October 13
- Game time: 1:00 pm. EDT
- Game weather: 65 °F (18 °C), mostly cloudy
- Game attendance: 67,739
- Referee: Ed Hochuli
- TV announcers (CBS): Kevin Harlan, Solomon Wilcots and Boomer Esiason
- Recap, Game book

Game information

First quarter

- CIN – Mike Nugent 46-yard field goal, 12:14. Bengals 3–0. Drive: 7 plays, 52 yards, 2:46.
- BUF – Thaddeus Lewis 3-yard run (Dan Carpenter kick), 10:01. Bills 7–3. Drive: 6 plays, 73 yards, 2:13.
- CIN – A. J. Green 18-yard pass from Andy Dalton (Mike Nugent kick), 5:26. Bengals 10–7. Drive: 8 plays, 83 yards, 4:35.

Second quarter

- CIN – Giovani Bernard 20-yard pass from Andy Dalton (Mike Nugent kick), 8:34. Bengals 17–7. Drive: 9 plays, 98 yards, 5:07.
- BUF – Dan Carpenter 51-yard field goal, 4:14. Bengals 17–10. Drive: 10 plays, 45 yards, 4:20.

Third quarter

- CIN – Marvin Jones Jr. 10-yard pass from Andy Dalton (Mike Nugent kick), 10:49. Bengals 24–10. Drive: 9 plays, 53 yards, 2:51.

Fourth quarter

- BUF – Scott Chandler 22-yard pass from Thaddeus Lewis (Dan Carpenter kick), 10:13. Bengals 24–17. Drive: 8 plays, 45 yards, 2:33.
- BUF – Marquise Goodwin 40-yard pass from Thaddeus Lewis (Dan Carpenter kick), 1:08. Tied 24–24. Drive: 7 plays, 86 yards, 1:32.

Overtime

- CIN – Mike Nugent 43-yard field goal, 6:44. Bengals 27–24. Drive: 4 plays, 8 yards, 2:04.

Top passers

- CIN – Andy Dalton – 26/40, 337 yards, 3 TD, INT
- BUF – Thaddeus Lewis – 19/32, 216 yards, 2 TD

Top rushers

- CIN – BenJarvus Green-Ellis – 18 rushes, 86 yards
- BUF – C. J. Spiller – 10 rushes, 55 yards

Top receivers

- CIN – A. J. Green – 6 receptions, 103 yards, TD
- BUF – T. J. Graham – 4 receptions, 74 yards

Mike Nugent would kick the game-winning field goal in overtime to seal the game for the Bengals. With the win, the Bengals went to 4-2 and picked up their first win in Buffalo since 1985, snapping their 6-game road losing streak against the Bills.

==== Week 7: at Detroit Lions ====
Week Seven: Cincinnati Bengals at Detroit Lions – Game summary

Quarter	1	2	3	4	Total
Bengals	7	7	10	3	27
Lions	7	3	7	7	24

at Ford Field, Detroit, Michigan

- Date: October 20
- Game time: 1:00 pm. EDT
- Game weather: Played indoors (dome stadium)
- Game attendance: 63,207
- Referee: Scott Green
- TV announcers (CBS): Marv Albert and Rich Gannon
- Recap, Game book

Game information

First quarter

- CIN – A. J. Green 82-yard pass from Andy Dalton (Mike Nugent kick), 10:59. Bengals 7–0. Drive: 3 plays, 90 yards, 0:55.
- DET – Brandon Pettigrew 3-yard pass from Matthew Stafford (David Akers kick), 3:02. Tied 7–7. Drive: 16 plays, 80 yards, 7:57.

Second quarter

- DET – David Akers 36-yard field goal, 11:43. Lions 10–7. Drive: 13 plays, 56 yards, 5:27.
- CIN – Marvin Jones Jr. 12-yard pass from Andy Dalton (Mike Nugent kick), 0:41. Bengals 14–10. Drive: 7 plays, 40 yards, 1:36.

Third quarter

- CIN – Tyler Eifert 32-yard pass from Andy Dalton (Mike Nugent kick), 10:42. Bengals 21–10. Drive: 9 plays, 80 yards, 4:18.
- DET – Calvin Johnson 27-yard pass from Matthew Stafford (David Akers kick), 8:17. Bengals 21–17. Drive: 8 plays, 80 yards, 2:25.
- CIN – Mike Nugent 48-yard field goal, 3:37. Bengals 24–17. Drive: 9 plays, 50 yards, 4:40.

Fourth quarter

- DET – Calvin Johnson 50-yard pass from Matthew Stafford (David Akers kick), 11:59. Tied 24–24. Drive: 6 plays, 78 yards, 2:53.
- CIN – Mike Nugent 54-yard field goal, 0:00. Bengals 27–24. Drive: 3 plays, 15 yards, 0:26.

Top passers

- CIN – Andy Dalton – 24/34, 372 yards, 3 TD
- DET – Matthew Stafford – 28/51, 337 yards, 3 TD

Top rushers

- CIN – Giovani Bernard – 7 rushes, 27 yards
- DET – Reggie Bush – 20 rushes, 50 yards

Top receivers

- CIN – A. J. Green – 6 receptions, 155 yards, TD
- DET – Calvin Johnson – 9 receptions, 155 yards, 2 TD

Mike Nugent would come through with the clutch as the Bengals won 27–24 for the second week in a row. With their 5th straight win in Detroit, the Bengals went to 5–2.

==== Week 8: vs. New York Jets ====
Week Eight: New York Jets at Cincinnati Bengals – Game summary

Quarter	1	2	3	4	Total
Jets	0	6	3	0	9
Bengals	14	14	14	7	49

at Paul Brown Stadium, Cincinnati, Ohio

- Date: October 27
- Game time: 4:05 pm. EDT
- Game weather: 57 °F (14 °C), sunny
- Game attendance: 62,576
- Referee: Pete Morelli
- TV announcers (CBS): Kevin Harlan and Solomon Wilcots
- Recap, Game book

Game information

First quarter

- CIN – Marvin Jones Jr. 9-yard pass from Andy Dalton (Mike Nugent kick), 9:59. Bengals 7–0. Drive: 10 plays, 80 yards, 5:01.
- CIN – Jermaine Gresham 4-yard pass from Andy Dalton (Mike Nugent kick), 4:21. Bengals 14–0. Drive: 7 plays, 68 yards, 4:01.

Second quarter

- NYJ – Nick Folk 45-yard field goal, 9:09. Bengals 14–3. Drive: 4 plays, 3 yards, 1:51.
- CIN – Marvin Jones Jr. 6-yard pass from Andy Dalton (Mike Nugent kick), 6:13. Bengals 21–3. Drive: 8 plays, 86 yards, 2:56.
- NYJ – Nick Folk 47-yard field goal, 1:08. Bengals 21–6. Drive: 10 plays, 50 yards, 5:05.
- CIN – Marvin Jones Jr. 14-yard pass from Andy Dalton (Mike Nugent kick), 0:16. Bengals 28–6. Drive: 4 plays, 29 yards, 0:52.

Third quarter

- CIN – Chris Crocker 32-yard interception return (Mike Nugent kick), 14:45. Bengals 35–6.
- NYJ – Nick Folk 50-yard field goal, 4:49. Bengals 35–9. Drive: 13 plays, 52 yards, 6:37.
- CIN – Marvin Jones Jr. 6-yard pass from Andy Dalton (Mike Nugent kick), 1:13. Bengals 42–9. Drive: 7 plays, 74 yards, 3:36.

Fourth quarter

- CIN – Pacman Jones 60-yard interception return (Mike Nugent kick), 13:09. Bengals 49–9.

Top passers

- NYJ – Geno Smith – 20/30, 159 yards, 2 INT
- CIN – Andy Dalton – 19/30, 325 yards, 5 TD, INT

Top rushers

- NYJ – Matt Simms – 3 rushes, 35 yards
- CIN – BenJarvus Green-Ellis – 11 rushes, 33 yards

Top receivers

- NYJ – David Nelson – 8 receptions, 80 yards
- CIN – Marvin Jones Jr. – 8 receptions, 122 yards, 4 TD

With the blowout win, the Bengals improved to 6–2. This win also remains the largest in the Marvin Lewis era, as of 2016. The 49 points were also the most scored by the Bengals since 2009 against the Bears.

==== Week 9: at Miami Dolphins ====
Week Nine: Cincinnati Bengals at Miami Dolphins – Game summary

Quarter	1	2	3	4	OT	Total
Bengals	0	3	7	10	0	20
Dolphins	0	10	7	3	2	22

at Sun Life Stadium, Miami Gardens, Florida

- Date: October 31
- Game time: 8:25 pm. EDT
- Game weather: 79 °F (26 °C), partly cloudy
- Game attendance: 52,388
- Referee: Bill Leavy
- TV announcers (NFLN): Brad Nessler, Mike Mayock and Alex Flanagan
- Recap, Game book

Game information

First quarter

- No scoring plays.

Second quarter

- CIN – Mike Nugent 31-yard field goal, 11:56. Bengals 3–0. Drive: 14 plays, 63 yards, 5:57.
- MIA – Ryan Tannehill 1-yard run (Caleb Sturgis kick), 2:39. Dolphins 7–3. Drive: 11 plays, 93 yards, 5:51.
- MIA – Caleb Sturgis 36-yard field goal, 0:06. Dolphins 10–3. Drive: 5 plays, 22 yards, 0:22.

Third quarter

- MIA – Brent Grimes 94-yard interception return (Caleb Sturgis kick), 7:37. Dolphins 17–3.
- CIN – Giovani Bernard 3-yard run (Mike Nugent kick), 2:10. Dolphins 17–10. Drive: 12 plays, 80 yards, 5:27.

Fourth quarter

- CIN – Giovani Bernard 35-yard run (Mike Nugent kick), 12:37. Tied 17–17. Drive: 4 plays, 70 yards, 2:15.
- CIN – Mike Nugent 54-yard field goal, 1:24. Bengals 20–17. Drive: 9 plays, 35 yards, 1:43.
- MIA – Caleb Sturgis 44-yard field goal, 0:00. Tied 20–20. Drive: 9 plays, 50 yards, 1:13.

Overtime

- MIA – Andy Dalton sacked in endzone by Cameron Wake for a safety, 6:38. Dolphins 22–20.

Top passers

- CIN – Andy Dalton – 32/58, 338 yards, 3 INT
- MIA – Ryan Tannehill – 20/28, 208 yards

Top rushers

- CIN – Giovani Bernard – 9 rushes, 79 yards, 2 TD
- MIA – Lamar Miller – 16 rushes, 105 yards

Top receivers

- CIN – A. J. Green – 11 receptions, 128 yards
- MIA – Mike Wallace – 6 receptions, 82 yards

Andy Dalton would have a rough night, as he was intercepted 3 times. The game would end with him getting sacked in the end zone by Cameron Wake. This was also the first overtime game to end on a safety since 2004.

==== Week 10: at Baltimore Ravens ====
Week Ten: Cincinnati Bengals at Baltimore Ravens – Game summary

Quarter	1	2	3	4	OT	Total
Bengals	0	0	3	14	0	17
Ravens	10	7	0	0	3	20

at M&T Bank Stadium, Baltimore, Maryland

- Date: November 10
- Game time: 1:00 pm. EST
- Game weather: 60 °F (16 °C), sunny
- Game attendance: 70,992
- Referee: Walt Coleman
- TV announcers (CBS): Greg Gumbel and Dan Dierdorf
- Recap, Game book

Game information

First quarter

- BAL – Dallas Clark 1-yard pass from Joe Flacco (Justin Tucker kick), 9:42. Ravens 7–0. Drive: 3 plays, 53 yards, 1:26.
- BAL – Justin Tucker 36-yard field goal, 4:39. Ravens 10–0. Drive: 7 plays, 58 yards, 1:55.

Second quarter

- BAL – Torrey Smith 7-yard pass from Joe Flacco (Justin Tucker kick), 6:30. Ravens 17–0. Drive: 2 plays, 11 yards, 0:49.

Third quarter

- CIN – Mike Nugent 32-yard field goal, 10:37. Ravens 17–3. Drive: 11 plays, 61 yards, 4:23.

Fourth quarter

- CIN – Giovani Bernard 18-yard pass from Andy Dalton (Mike Nugent kick), 8:22. Ravens 17–10. Drive: 8 plays, 71 yards, 4:08.
- CIN – A. J. Green 51-yard pass from Andy Dalton (Mike Nugent kick), 0:00. Tied 17–17. Drive: 7 plays, 60 yards, 1:28.

Overtime

- BAL – Justin Tucker 46-yard field goal, 5:27. Ravens 20–17. Drive: 8 plays, 28 yards, 4:34.

Top passers

- CIN – Andy Dalton – 24/51, 274 yards, 2 TD, 3 INT
- BAL – Joe Flacco – 20/36, 140 yards, 2 TD, 2 INT

Top rushers

- CIN – Giovani Bernard – 14 rushes, 58 yards
- BAL – Bernard Pierce – 8 rushes, 31 yards

Top receivers

- CIN – A. J. Green – 8 receptions, 151 yards, TD
- BAL – Torrey Smith – 5 receptions, 46 yards, TD

Despite out-gaining Baltimore in total yardage, 364–189, and a Hail Mary at the end of regulation to force overtime, Andy Dalton threw 3 interceptions in the loss. With the loss, the Bengals fell to 6–4.

==== Week 11: vs. Cleveland Browns ====
Week Eleven: Cleveland Browns at Cincinnati Bengals – Game summary

Quarter	1	2	3	4	Total
Browns	13	0	7	0	20
Bengals	0	31	0	10	41

at Paul Brown Stadium, Cincinnati, Ohio

- Date: November 17
- Game time: 1:00 pm. EST
- Game weather: 62 °F (17 °C), cloudy
- Game attendance: 63,856
- Referee: Carl Cheffers
- TV announcers (CBS): Marv Albert and Rich Gannon
- Recap, Game book

Game information

First quarter

- CLE – Billy Cundiff 20-yard field goal, 4:10. Browns 3–0. Drive: 11 plays, 79 yards, 4:51.
- CLE – Billy Cundiff 21-yard field goal, 3:04. Browns 6–0. Drive: 4 plays, 4 yards, 0:58.
- CLE – Joe Haden 29-yard interception return (Billy Cundiff kick), 2:19. Browns 13–0.

Second quarter

- CIN – Jermaine Gresham 25-yard pass from Andy Dalton (Mike Nugent kick), 14:52. Browns 13–7. Drive: 2 plays, 22 yards, 0:52.
- CIN – Mohamed Sanu 6-yard pass from Andy Dalton (Mike Nugent kick), 11:49. Bengals 14–13. Drive: 5 plays, 38 yards, 1:34.
- CIN – Tony Dye 24-yard return of blocked punt (Mike Nugent kick), 4:35. Bengals 21–13.
- CIN – Vontaze Burfict 13-yard fumble return (Mike Nugent kick), 2:45. Bengals 28–13.
- CIN – Mike Nugent 41-yard field goal, 0:01. Bengals 31–13. Drive: 4 plays, 9 yards, 0:19.

Third quarter

- CLE – Josh Gordon 74-yard pass from Jason Campbell (Billy Cundiff kick), 9:29. Bengals 31–20. Drive: 2 plays, 79 yards, 0:46.

Fourth quarter

- CIN – Alex Smith 2-yard pass from Andy Dalton (Mike Nugent kick), 11:50. Bengals 38–20. Drive: 7 plays, 52 yards, 3:27.
- CIN – Mike Nugent 38-yard field goal, 8:04. Bengals 41–20. Drive: 4 plays, 1 yard, 2:44.

Top passers

- CLE – Jason Campbell – 27/56, 248 yards, TD, 3 INT
- CIN – Andy Dalton – 13/27, 93 yards, 3 TD, 2 INT

Top rushers

- CLE – Chris Ogbonnaya – 8 rushes, 69 yards
- CIN – BenJarvus Green-Ellis – 16 rushes, 62 yards

Top receivers

- CLE – Josh Gordon – 5 receptions, 125 yards, TD
- CIN – Giovani Bernard – 4 receptions, 41 yards

The Bengals set a franchise record for most points scored in 1 quarter with 31 in this game.

With the win, the Bengals improved to 7–4.

==== Week 13: at San Diego Chargers ====
Week Thirteen: Cincinnati Bengals at San Diego Chargers – Game summary

Quarter	1	2	3	4	Total
Bengals	0	7	7	3	17
Chargers	0	7	0	3	10

at Qualcomm Stadium, San Diego, California

- Date: December 1
- Game time: 4:25 pm. EST/1:25 p.m. PST
- Game weather: 77 °F (25 °C), sunny
- Game attendance: 61,536
- Referee: John Parry
- TV announcers (CBS): Ian Eagle and Dan Fouts
- Recap, Game book

Game information

First quarter

- No scoring plays.

Second quarter

- CIN – BenJarvus Green-Ellis 4-yard run (Mike Nugent kick), 14:56. Bengals 7–0. Drive: 10 plays, 67 yards, 4:40.
- SD – Ladarius Green 30-yard pass from Philip Rivers (Nick Novak kick), 11:11. Tied 7–7. Drive: 8 plays, 78 yards, 3:45.

Third quarter

- CIN – A. J. Green 21-yard pass from Andy Dalton (Mike Nugent kick), 1:42. Bengals 14–7. Drive: 10 plays, 75 yards, 5:21.

Fourth quarter

- CIN – Mike Nugent 46-yard field goal, 9:16. Bengals 17–7. Drive: 7 plays, 62 yards, 3:27.
- SD – Nick Novak 48-yard field goal, 4:43. Bengals 17–10. Drive: 8 plays, 27 yards, 2:07.

Top passers

- CIN – Andy Dalton – 14/23, 190 yards, TD, INT
- SD – Philip Rivers 23/37, 252 yards, TD, INT

Top rushers

- CIN – BenJarvus Green-Ellis – 20 rushes, 92 yards, TD
- SD – Ryan Matthews – 14 rushes, 61 yards

Top receivers

- CIN – A. J. Green – 5 receptions, 83 yards, TD
- SD – Keenan Allen – 8 receptions, 106 yards

The Chargers opened the game by driving 45 yards to the Bengals 31, but on 3rd-and-10, Philip Rivers completed a 13-yard pass to Antonio Gates who was stripped by Reggie Nelson with George Iloka recovering for Cincinnati. After both teams swapped punts, the Bengals marched 67 yards in 10 plays with BenJarvus Green-Ellis rushing for a 4-yard touchdown on the first play of the 2nd quarter. The Bengals responded on their very next drive, driving 78 yards in only 8 plays with Rivers bombing a 30-yard touchdown pass to Ladarius Green. After both teams swapped punts again, Andy Dalton was intercepted by Eric Weddle who returned it 21 yards to the Chargers 45. The game was a 7–7 deadlock at halftime. However, on the Chargers opening drive of the second half Rivers was intercepted by Dre Kirkpatrick at the Bengals 25. The Bengals responded by driving 59 yards on a 10-play drive with Dalton connecting with superstar receiver A. J. Green on a 21-yard touchdown pass for a 14–7 lead. The Chargers drove to the Bengals 31, but were forced to punt. But the Bengals drove 61 yards before Mike Nugent booted a 47-yard field goal, extending the lead to 17–7. On their next drive, Rivers hit Keenan Allen for 14 yards, but Iloka forced Allen to fumble and Vincent Rey recovered for the Bengals. The Bengals took over at the Chargers 34. Two plays later Dalton threw a short pass to for 5 yards, but was stripped by Marcus Gilchrist with Weddle recovering and returning the ball 27 yards to the Bengals 43. The Chargers reached the Bengals 30 and Nick Novak made it a 7-point game at 17–10 with his 48-yard field goal. The Bengals ended the game with a Green-Ellis 5-yard run to the Chargers 3-yard line with less than two minutes remaining. With the win the Bengals improved to 8–4.

==== Week 14: vs. Indianapolis Colts ====
Week Fourteen: Indianapolis Colts at Cincinnati Bengals – Game summary

Quarter	1	2	3	4	Total
Colts	0	0	14	14	28
Bengals	7	7	14	14	42

at Paul Brown Stadium, Cincinnati, Ohio

- Date: December 8
- Game time: 1:00 pm. EST
- Game weather: 25 °F (−4 °C), cloudy, chance of snow
- Game attendance: 62,507
- Referee: Jeff Triplette
- TV announcers (CBS): Greg Gumbel and Dan Dierdorf
- Recap, Game book

Game information

First quarter

- CIN – Marvin Jones Jr. 29-yard pass from Andy Dalton (Mike Nugent kick), 8:03. Bengals 7–0. Drive: 10 plays, 83 yards, 5:22.

Second quarter

- CIN – BenJarvus Green-Ellis 1-yard run (Mike Nugent kick), 1:06. Bengals 14–0. Drive: 8 plays, 66 yards, 3:54.

Third quarter

- CIN – BenJarvus Green-Ellis 1-yard run (Mike Nugent kick), 10:41. Bengals 21–0. Drive: 9 plays, 80 yards, 4:19.
- IND – Da'Rick Rogers 69-yard pass from Andrew Luck (Adam Vinatieri kick), 9:57. Bengals 21–7. Drive: 3 plays, 74 yards, 0:44.
- IND – LaVon Brazill 19-yard pass from Andrew Luck (Adam Vinatieri kick), 6:20. Bengals 21–14. Drive: 3 plays, 48 yards, 1:02.
- CIN – Jermaine Gresham 1-yard pass from Andy Dalton (Mike Nugent kick), 3:05. Bengals 28–14. Drive: 6 plays, 60 yards, 3:15.

Fourth quarter

- CIN – A. J. Green 9-yard pass from Andy Dalton (Mike Nugent kick), 13:25. Bengals 35–14. Drive: 7 plays, 59 yards, 3:25.
- IND – LaVon Brazill 29-yard pass from Andrew Luck (Adam Vinatieri kick), 9:48. Bengals 35–21. Drive: 8 plays, 75 yards, 3:37.
- CIN – Andy Dalton 8-yard run (Mike Nugent kick), 4:03. Bengals 42–21. Drive: 5 plays, 29 yards, 3:15.
- IND – Da'Rick Rogers 2-yard pass from Andrew Luck (Adam Vinatieri kick), 1:20. Bengals 42–28. Drive: 10 plays, 72 yards, 2:43.

Top passers

- IND – Andrew Luck – 29/46, 326 yards, 4 TD
- CIN – Andy Dalton – 24/35, 275 yards, 3 TD

Top rushers

- IND – Andrew Luck – 2 rushes, 32 yards
- CIN – Giovani Bernard – 12 rushes, 99 yards

Top receivers

- IND – Da'Rick Rogers – 6 receptions, 107 yards, 2 TD
- CIN – A. J. Green – 6 receptions, 72 yards, TD

With the win, the Bengals improved to 9–4.

==== Week 15: at Pittsburgh Steelers ====
Week Fifteen: Cincinnati Bengals at Pittsburgh Steelers – Game summary

Quarter	1	2	3	4	Total
Bengals	0	7	0	13	20
Steelers	21	6	3	0	30

at Heinz Field, Pittsburgh, Pennsylvania

- Date: December 15
- Game time: 8:30 pm. EST
- Game weather: 26 °F (−3 °C), cloudy
- Game attendance: 45,873
- Referee: Ed Hochuli
- TV announcers (NBC): Al Michaels, Cris Collinsworth and Michele Tafoya
- Recap, Game book

Game information

First quarter

- PIT – Le'Veon Bell 1-yard run (Shaun Suisham kick), 9:58. Steelers 7–0. Drive: 2 plays, 1 yard, 0:42.
- PIT – Antonio Brown 12-yard pass from Ben Roethlisberger (Shaun Suisham kick), 2:16. Steelers 14–0. Drive: 8 plays, 47 yards, 4:20.
- PIT – Antonio Brown 67-yard punt return (Shaun Suisham kick), 1:12. Steelers 21–0.

Second quarter

- PIT – Shaun Suisham 25-yard field goal, 9:36. Steelers 24–0. Drive: 11 plays, 60 yards, 4:55.
- CIN – Giovani Bernard 1-yard run (Mike Nugent kick), 5:14. Steelers 24–7. Drive: 9 plays, 47 yards, 4:22.
- PIT – Shaun Suisham 45-yard field goal, 1:14. Steelers 27–7. Drive: 10 plays, 46 yards, 4:00.

Third quarter

- PIT – Shaun Suisham 26-yard field goal, 6:18. Steelers 30–7. Drive: 9 plays, 55 yards, 4:19.

Fourth quarter

- CIN – Tyler Eifert 1-yard pass from Andy Dalton (Mike Nugent kick), 14:09. Steelers 30–14. Drive: 13 plays, 63 yards, 7:09.
- CIN – Marvin Jones Jr. 13-yard pass from Andy Dalton (pass failed), 5:46. Steelers 30–20. Drive: 10 plays, 75 yards, 4:26.

Top passers

- CIN – Andy Dalton – 25/44, 230 yards, 2 TD
- PIT – Ben Roethlisberger – 20/25, 191 yards, TD, INT

Top rushers

- CIN – Giovani Bernard – 13 rushes, 33 yards, TD
- PIT – Le'Veon Bell – 24 rushes, 57 yards, TD

Top receivers

- CIN – A. J. Green – 9 receptions, 93 yards
- PIT – Antonio Brown – 5 receptions, 66 yards, TD

With the loss, the Bengals fell to 9–5 and enabled their division rival Ravens to be in the running for the AFC North title.

==== Week 16: vs. Minnesota Vikings ====
Week Sixteen: Minnesota Vikings at Cincinnati Bengals – Game summary

Quarter	1	2	3	4	Total
Vikings	7	0	7	0	14
Bengals	14	14	14	0	42

at Paul Brown Stadium, Cincinnati, Ohio

- Date: December 22
- Game time: 1:00 pm. EST
- Game weather: 53 °F (12 °C), mostly cloudy
- Game attendance: 61,555
- Referee: Terry McAulay
- TV announcers (Fox): Dick Stockton, Ronde Barber and Kris Budden
- Recap, Game book

Game information

First quarter

- CIN – BenJarvus Green-Ellis 4-yard run (Mike Nugent kick), 13:12. Bengals 7–0. Drive: 2 plays, 4 yards, 0:12.
- MIN – Jarius Wright 36-yard pass from Matt Cassel (Blair Walsh kick), 10:02. Tied 7–7. Drive: 4 plays, 54 yards, 1:57.
- CIN – A. J. Green 29-yard pass from Andy Dalton (Mike Nugent kick), 0:57. Bengals 14–7. Drive: 10 plays, 90 yards, 5:21.

Second quarter

- CIN – Vincent Rey 25-yard interception return (Mike Nugent kick), 10:02. Bengals 21–7.
- CIN – Jermaine Gresham 16-yard pass from Andy Dalton (Mike Nugent kick), 2:22. Bengals 28–7. Drive: 8 plays, 44 yards, 3:09.

Third quarter

- CIN – Mohamed Sanu 7-yard pass from Andy Dalton (Mike Nugent kick), 10:35. Bengals 35–7. Drive: 8 plays, 80 yards, 4:25.
- CIN – A. J. Green 2-yard pass from Andy Dalton (Mike Nugent kick), 3:19. Bengals 42–7. Drive: 9 plays, 66 yards, 5:12.
- MIN – Cordarrelle Patterson 35-yard run (Blair Walsh kick), 1:34. Bengals 42–14. Drive: 5 plays, 67 yards, 1:45.

Fourth quarter

- No scoring plays.

Top passers

- MIN – Matt Cassel – 13/27, 114 yards, TD, 3 INT
- CIN – Andy Dalton – 27/38, 363 yards, 4 TD

Top rushers

- MIN – Cordarrelle Patterson – 3 rushes, 54 yards, TD
- CIN – BenJarvus Green-Ellis – 12 rushes, 24 yards, TD

Top receivers

- MIN – Jarius Wright – 1 reception, 36 yards, TD
- CIN – A. J. Green – 7 receptions, 97 yards, TD

With the win, the Bengals improved to 10–5, and with the Ravens' loss to the Patriots later in the evening, they clinched the AFC North title.

==== Week 17: vs. Baltimore Ravens ====
Week Seventeen: Baltimore Ravens at Cincinnati Bengals – Game summary

Quarter	1	2	3	4	Total
Ravens	6	0	11	0	17
Bengals	7	10	0	17	34

at Paul Brown Stadium, Cincinnati, Ohio

- Date: December 29
- Game time: 1:00 pm. EST
- Game weather: 43 °F (6 °C), cloudy
- Game attendance: 62,406
- Referee: Scott Green
- TV announcers (CBS): Jim Nantz and Phil Simms
- Recap, Game book

Game information

First quarter

- BAL – Justin Tucker 38-yard field goal, 13:48. Ravens 3–0. Drive: 4 plays, 1 yard, 0:54.
- BAL – Justin Tucker 22-yard field goal, 2:26. Ravens 6–0. Drive: 12 plays, 61 yards, 6:37.
- CIN – A. J. Green 53-yard pass from Andy Dalton (Mike Nugent kick), 0:17. Bengals 7–6. Drive: 4 plays, 78 yards, 2:09.

Second quarter

- CIN – Mike Nugent 39-yard field goal, 6:36. Bengals 10–6. Drive: 7 plays, 22 yards, 2:17.
- CIN – Marvin Jones Jr. 16-yard pass from Andy Dalton (Mike Nugent kick), 1:51. Bengals 17–6. Drive: 5 plays, 52 yards, 2:50.

Third quarter

- BAL – Justin Tucker 34-yard field goal, 9:30. Bengals 17–9. Drive: 7 plays, 31 yards, 2:44.
- BAL – Marlon Brown 8-yard pass from Joe Flacco (Ray Rice run), 5:13. Tied 17–17. Drive: 6 plays, 40 yards, 2:21.

Fourth quarter

- CIN – Andy Dalton 1-yard run (Mike Nugent kick), 13:29. Bengals 24–17. Drive: 12 plays, 90 yards, 6:44.
- CIN – Mike Nugent 38-yard field goal, 12:19. Bengals 27–17. Drive: 4 plays, 0 yards, 0:57.
- CIN – Dre Kirkpatrick 21-yard interception return (Mike Nugent kick), 4:07. Bengals 34–17.

Top passers

- BAL – Joe Flacco – 30/50, 192 yards, TD, 3 INT
- CIN – Andy Dalton – 21/36, 281 yards, 2 TD, 4 INT

Top rushers

- BAL – Bernard Pierce – 5 rushes, 28 yards
- CIN – BenJarvus Green-Ellis – 11 rushes, 66 yards

Top receivers

- BAL – Dennis Pitta – 8 receptions, 63 yards
- CIN – Andrew Hawkins – 3 receptions, 74 yards

With the win, the Bengals surpassed their win total from 2012. Unfortunately, it wasn't enough to give the Bengals a first-round bye in the playoffs due to the Patriots defeating Buffalo later that day.

=== Postseason ===
==== AFC Wild Card Playoffs: vs. (6) San Diego Chargers ====
AFC Wild Card Playoffs: (6) San Diego Chargers at (3) Cincinnati Bengals – Game summary

Quarter	1	2	3	4	Total
Chargers	7	0	10	10	27
Bengals	0	10	0	0	10

at Paul Brown Stadium, Cincinnati, Ohio

- Date: January 5, 2014
- Game time: 1:05 p.m. EST
- Game weather: 42 °F (6 °C), cloudy
- Game attendance: 62,277
- Referee: Jeff Triplette
- TV announcers (CBS): Jim Nantz, Phil Simms and Tracy Wolfson
- Recap, Game book

Game information

First quarter

- SD – Danny Woodhead 5-yard run (Nick Novak kick), 0:48. Chargers 7–0. Drive: 11 plays, 86 yards, 6:56.

Second quarter

- CIN – Jermaine Gresham 4-yard pass from Andy Dalton (Mike Nugent kick), 5:59. Tied 7–7. Drive: 10 plays, 60 yards, 6:07.
- CIN – Mike Nugent 46-yard field goal, 0:00. Bengals 10–7. Drive: 6 plays, 40 yards, 1:14.

Third quarter

- SD – Ladarius Green 4-yard pass from Philip Rivers (Nick Novak kick), 6:46. Chargers 14–10. Drive: 10 plays, 80 yards, 5:40.
- SD – Nick Novak 25-yard field goal, 2:00. Chargers 17–10. Drive: 9 plays, 40 yards, 3:41.

Fourth quarter

- SD – Nick Novak 23-yard field goal, 14:16. Chargers 20–10. Drive: 5 plays, −2 yards, 1:55.
- SD – Ronnie Brown 58-yard run (Nick Novak kick), 2:17. Chargers 27–10. Drive: 2 plays, 60 yards, 0:50.

Top passers

- SD – Philip Rivers – 12/16, 128 yards, 1 TD
- CIN – Andy Dalton – 29/51, 334 yards, 1 TD, 2 INT

Top rushers

- SD – Ronnie Brown – 8 rushes, 77 yards, 1 TD
- CIN – Giovani Bernard – 12 rushes, 45 yards

Leading receivers

- SD – Ladarius Green – 3 rec, 34 yards, 1 TD
- CIN – Marvin Jones – 8 rec, 130 yards

The Bengals lost the AFC Wild Card playoff game against the Chargers, 27–10, thus eliminating them. This loss also gives the team their 6th straight playoff loss dating back to the 1990 playoffs.

== Standings ==
=== Division ===
AFC North
	W	L	T	PCT	DIV	CONF	PF	PA	STK
^{(3)} Cincinnati Bengals	11	5	0	.688	3–3	8–4	430	305	W2
Pittsburgh Steelers	8	8	0	.500	4–2	6–6	379	370	W3
Baltimore Ravens	8	8	0	.500	3–3	6–6	320	352	L2
Cleveland Browns	4	12	0	.250	2–4	3–9	308	406	L7

=== Conference ===
AFC
#	Team	Division	W	L	T	PCT	DIV	CONF	SOS	SOV	STK
Division winners
1	Denver Broncos	West	13	3	0	.813	5–1	9–3	.469	.423	W2
2	New England Patriots	East	12	4	0	.750	4–2	9–3	.473	.427	W2
3 (Note: Cincinnati defeated Indianapolis head-to-head (Week 14, 42–28).)	Cincinnati Bengals	North	11	5	0	.688	3–3	8–4	.480	.494	W2
4	Indianapolis Colts	South	11	5	0	.688	6–0	9–3	.484	.449	W3
Wild cards
5	Kansas City Chiefs	West	11	5	0	.688	2–4	7–5	.445	.335	L2
6	San Diego Chargers	West	9	7	0	.563	4–2	6–6	.496	.549	W4
Did not qualify for the postseason
7 (Note: Pittsburgh finished with a better division record than Baltimore.) (Note: Pittsburgh defeated the New York Jets head-to-head (Week 6, 19–6).)	Pittsburgh Steelers	North	8	8	0	.500	4–2	6–6	.469	.441	W3
8 (Note: Baltimore defeated the New York Jets head-to-head (Week 12, 19–3).)	Baltimore Ravens	North	8	8	0	.500	3–3	6–6	.484	.418	L2
9 (Note: The New York Jets finished with a better division record than Miami.)	New York Jets	East	8	8	0	.500	3–3	5–7	.488	.414	W2
10	Miami Dolphins	East	8	8	0	.500	2–4	7–5	.523	.523	L2
11	Tennessee Titans	South	7	9	0	.438	2–4	6–6	.504	.375	W2
12	Buffalo Bills	East	6	10	0	.375	3–3	5–7	.520	.500	L1
13 (Note: Oakland and Jacksonville finished with a better conference record than Cleveland.) (Note: Oakland defeated Jacksonville head-to-head (Week 2, 19–9).)	Oakland Raiders	West	4	12	0	.250	1–5	4–8	.523	.359	L6
14 (Note: Jacksonville defeated Cleveland head-to-head (Week 13, 32–28).)	Jacksonville Jaguars	South	4	12	0	.250	3–3	4–8	.504	.234	L3
15	Cleveland Browns	North	4	12	0	.250	2–4	3–9	.516	.477	L7
16	Houston Texans	South	2	14	0	.125	1–5	2–10	.559	.500	L14
Tiebreakers (Note: When breaking ties for three or more teams under the NFL's rules, they are first broken within divisions, then comparing only the highest ranked remaining team from each division.)

== Statistics ==
=== Team ===
Updated December 31, 2013

	Bengals	Opponent
Total First Downs	330	282
Rushing First Downs	101	72
Passing First Downs	205	178
By Penalty First Downs	24	32
Third Down Conversions	92/225	74/225
Fourth Down Conversions	12/21	5/16
Total Offensive Yards	5,894	4,888
Offensive Plays	1,097	1,042
Average Yards per Play	5.4	4.7
Total Rushing Yards	1,755	1,544
Rushing Plays	481	385
Rushing Yards per Play	3.6	4.0
Total Passing Yards	4,139	3,344
Passing Completions/Attempts	364/587	362/612
Interceptions	20	20
Passing Yards per Play	7.4	5.9
Sacks	43.0	29.0
Field Goals	18/22	26/31
Touchdowns	54	32
Rushing Touchdowns	14	6
Passing Touchdowns	33	22
Return Touchdowns	2	1
Defensive Touchdowns	6	3
Time of Possession	32:49	28:48
Turnover Ratio	+1	

=== Individual ===
==== Passing ====
Updated December 31, 2013

Regular season
Player	ATT	COMP	YDS	COMP %	YDS/ATT	TD	TD %	INT	INT %	LONG	SCK	LOST	RATING
Andy Dalton	586	363	4,296	61.9	7.3	33	5.6	20	3.4	82	29	182	88.8
Mohamed Sanu	1	1	25	100.0	25.0	0	0.0	0	0.0	25	0	0	118.8

==== Rushing ====
Updated January 3, 2014

Regular season
Player	ATT	YDS	YDS/ATT	LONG	TD
BenJarvus Green-Ellis	220	756	3.4	25	7
Giovani Bernard	170	695	4.1	35	5
Andy Dalton	61	183	3.06	12	2
Marvin Jones	8	65	8.1	34	0
Josh Johnson	7	20	2.9	10	0
Cedric Peerman	8	17	2.1	5	0
Mohamed Sanu	4	16	4.0	9	0
Andrew Hawkins	2	3	1.5	6	0
Kevin Huber	1	0	0.0	0	0
Total	481	1,755	3.6	35	14

==== Receiving ====
Updated January 3, 2014

Regular season
Player	REC	YDS	YDS/REC	LONG	TD
A. J. Green	98	1,426	14.6	82	11
Giovani Bernard	56	514	9.2	41	3
Marvin Jones	35	712	14.0	45	10
Mohamed Sanu	47	455	9.7	32	2
Jermaine Gresham	46	458	10.0	30	4
Tyler Eifert	39	445	11.4	61	2
Andrew Hawkins	12	199	16.6	50	0
Dane Sanzenbacher	6	61	10.2	23	0
BenJarvus Green-Ellis	4	22	5.5	10	0
Alex Smith	3	12	4.0	7	1
Brandon Tate	1	6	6.0	6	0
Orson Charles	1	8	8.0	8	0
Total	364	4,136	11.4	82	33

==== Field Goals ====
Updated January 10, 2014

Regular season
Player	1–19	20–29	30–39	40–49	50+
Mike Nugent	0/0	2/2	6/7	7/9	3/4
Total	0/0	2/2	6/7	7/9	3/4
Opponent Total	2/2	6/6	5/8	9/11	4/4

==== Punting ====
Updated January 10, 2014

Regular season
Player	Punts	AVG	TB	In 20	LONG	BLK
Kevin Huber	66	45.2	4	24	75	0
Shawn Powell	7	38.3	0	3	52	0
Mike Nugent	2	40.0	0	0	43	0
Total	75	44.4	4	27	75	0
Opponent Total	89	44.3	1	37	65	1

==== Punt Returns ====
Updated January 14, 2014

Regular season
Player	RT	FC	YDS/RET	LONG	TD
Brandon Tate	36	16	9.3	43	0
Adam Jones	11	0	8.0	27	0
Total	47	16	9.0	43	0
Opponent Total	27	22	9.4	67	1

==== Kick Returns ====
Updated January 14, 2014

Regular season
Player	RT	YDS	YDS/RET	LONG	TD
Brandon Tate	35	914	26.1	71	0
Cedric Peerman	4	66	16.5	26	0
Total	39	980	25.1	71	0
Opponent Total	52	1,219	23.4	48	0

==== Defense ====
Updated December 7, 2013

Regular season
Player	T	S	A	SCK	F
Vontaze Burfict	131	88	43	1	1
Terence Newman	48	42	6	0	0
Rey Maualuga	61	43	18	1	0
Adam Jones	44	36	8	0	1
Carlos Dunlap	44	32	12	7	4
George Iloka	55	34	21	0	2
Vincent Rey	46	29	17	3	0
Reggie Nelson	44	32	12	1	1
Michael Johnson	39	24	15	3	2
Chris Crocker	27	20	7	0.5	0
Wallace Gilberry	20	15	5	6.5	1
Leon Hall	20	14	6	0	0
James Harrison	27	13	14	2	0
Taylor Mays	19	12	7	0	0
Domata Peko	35	15	20	2.5	0
Brandon Thompson	19	12	7	1.5	0
Geno Atkins	20	9	11	6.0	0
Dre Kirkpatrick	9	8	1	1.0	0
Cedric Peerman	8	7	1	0	0
Jayson DiManche	12	6	6	0	0
Tyler Eifert	5	5	0	0	0
Michael Boley	6	4	2	0	0
Shawn Williams	10	6	4	0	0
Brandon Ghee	6	3	3	0	0
A. J. Green	3	3	0	0	0
Andrew Hawkins	3	3	0	0	0
Marvin Jones	4	3	1	0	0
Devon Still	7	3	4	0	0
Orson Charles	4	2	2	0	0
BenJarvus Green-Ellis	2	2	0	0	0
Andre Smith	2	2	0	0	0
Giovani Bernard	1	1	0	0	0
Clint Boling	2	1	1	0	0
Andy Dalton	2	1	1	0	0
Jermaine Gresham	1	1	0	0	0
Clark Harris	1	1	0	0	0
Chris Lewis-Harris	2	1	1	0	0
Jeromy Miles	1	1	0	0	0
Mike Nugent	1	1	0	0	0
Mohamed Sanu	1	1	0	0	0
J.K. Schaffer	2	1	1	0	0
Alex Smith	2	1	1	0	0
Ryan Whalen	1	1	0	0	0
Andrew Whitworth	1	1	0	0	0
Kevin Zeitler	1	1	0	0	0
Total	758	506	252	34	10
Opponent Total	812	527	285	26	11
