= Shawn Williams (American football) =

American football player (born 1991)

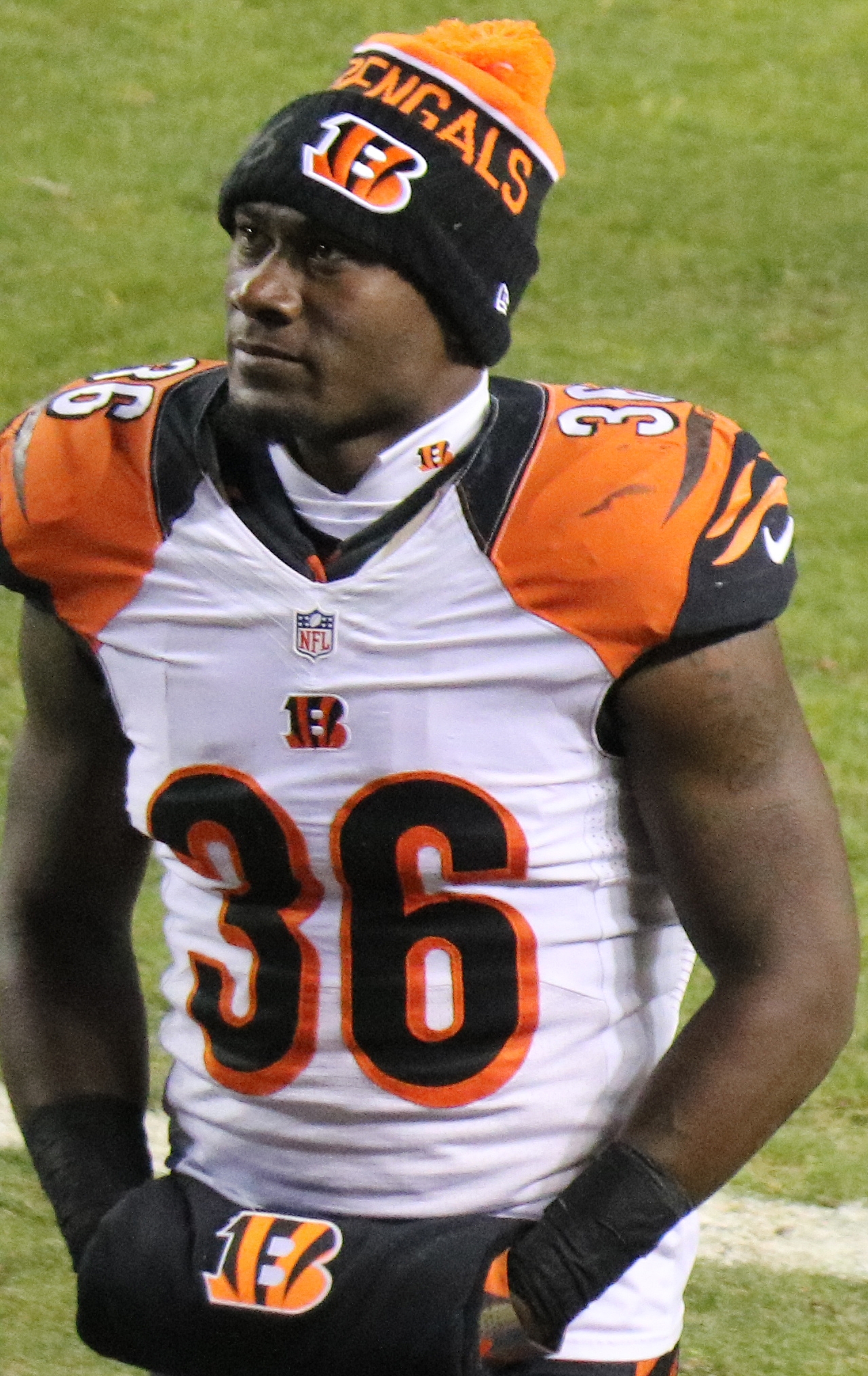
- Williams with the Cincinnati Bengals in 2015

No. 40, 36
- Position: Safety

Personal information
- Born: May 13, 1991 (age 35); Damascus, Georgia, U.S.
- Listed height: 6 ft 0 in (1.83 m)
- Listed weight: 212 lb (96 kg)

Career information
- High school: Early County (Blakely, Georgia)
- College: Georgia (2009-2012)
- NFL draft: 2013: 3rd round, 84th overall pick

Career history
- Cincinnati Bengals (2013–2020); Arizona Cardinals (2021)*; Atlanta Falcons (2021)
- * Offseason or practice squad member only

Career NFL statistics
- Total tackles: 447
- Sacks: 3
- Forced fumbles: 1
- Pass deflections: 26
- Interceptions: 12
- Defensive touchdowns: 1
- Stats at Pro Football Reference

Shawn Williams (born May 13, 1991) is an American former professional football player who was a safety in the National Football League (NFL). He played college football for the Georgia Bulldogs and was selected by the Cincinnati Bengals in the third round of the 2013 NFL draft.

== Early life ==
Williams was born in Damascus, Georgia. He attended Early County High School in Blakely, Georgia, and played football for the Early County Bobcats. As a senior in 2008, he recorded 59 tackles on defense, and recorded 24 receptions for 381 yards and five touchdowns on offense, and recorded 20 punts for 649 yards. He was named to the Atlanta Journal-Constitution Class AA first team on defense in 2008. As a junior in 2007, he recorded 66 tackles and three interceptions, and also had 21 receptions for 362 yards and five touchdowns on offense.

== College career ==
Williams attended the University of Georgia, where he played for head coach Mark Richt's Georgia Bulldogs football team from 2009 to 2012. During his college career, he started 30 of 54 games in which he appeared, and accumulated 209 tackles (131 solo), including 10.5 for a loss, 11 pass break ups, four interceptions and one quarterback sack.

== Professional career ==
External videos
- Shawn Williams' NFL Combine workout

Pre-draft measurables
Height	Weight	Arm length	Hand span	40-yard dash	10-yard split	20-yard split	20-yard shuttle	Three-cone drill	Vertical jump	Broad jump	Bench press
5 ft 11 7/8 in (1.83 m)	213 lb (97 kg)	30 3/4 in (0.78 m)	8 3/8 in (0.21 m)	4.46 s	1.54 s	2.61 s	4.25 s	7.01 s	36 in (0.91 m)	10 ft 0 in (3.05 m)	25 reps
All values are from NFL Combine

=== Cincinnati Bengals ===
==== 2013 ====
The Cincinnati Bengals selected Williams in the third round with the 84th overall pick in the 2013 NFL draft. Williams was the eighth safety selected in 2013.

On May 24, 2013, the Cincinnati Bengals signed Williams to a four-year, $2.76 million contract that included a signing bonus of $555,944.

Throughout training camp, Williams competed for a job as the starting strong safety against Taylor Mays, George Iloka, Jeromy Miles, and Tony Dye. Head coach Marvin Lewis named Williams the third strong safety on the depth chart to start the regular season, behind George Iloka and Taylor Mays.

He made his professional regular season debut in the Cincinnati Bengals' season-opening 24–21 loss at the Chicago Bears. In Week 6, he recorded his first career tackle on Marquise Goodwin with teammate Reggie Nelson during Goodwin's 26-yard kick return. He made two assisted tackles in the Bengals' 27–24 overtime victory at the Buffalo Bills. On October 27, 2013, Williams recorded his first solo tackle on quarterback Matt Simms after he rushed for a 22-yard gain in the fourth quarter. Williams finished the Bengals' 49–9 victory against the New York Jets with a season-high four combined tackles after replacing Taylor Mays, as the main backup safety, due to an injury. He finished his rookie season in 2013 with 12 combined tackles (eight solo) in 16 games and zero starts. The Cincinnati Bengals finished atop the AFC North with an 11–5 record. On January 5, 2014, Williams appeared in his first career playoff game as the Bengals' lost 27–10 to the San Diego Chargers in the AFC Wildcard Game.

==== 2014 ====
Williams entered training camp competing for a role as a backup safety against Taylor Mays, Danieal Manning, and Isaiah Lewis. New defensive coordinator Paul Guenther named Williams the backup strong safety, behind George Iloka, to start the regular season. On December 7, 2014, Williams recorded a season-high two combined tackles in a 42–21 loss to the Pittsburgh Steelers. He finished his second season with ten combined tackles (six solo) in 16 games and was a key contributor on special teams. On January 4, 2015, he made one solo tackle in the Bengals' 26–10 loss to the Indianapolis Colts in the AFC Wildcard Game. It marked Williams first career tackle in the postseason.

==== 2015 ====
Throughout training camp in 2015, Williams competed for the job as the backup safety against Shiloh Keo, Derron Smith, Floyd Raven Sr., and Erick Dargon. Head coach Marvin Lewis named Williams the backup free safety behind Reggie Nelson to start the regular season.

In Week 4, Williams recorded a season-high six combined tackles during a 36–21 victory against the Kansas City Chiefs. On November 1, 2015, Williams earned his first career start at nickelback and recorded one solo tackle, broke up a pass, and made his first career interception off a pass by quarterback Ben Roethlisberger in the Bengals' 16–10 win at the Pittsburgh Steelers. On December 20, 2015, he made his third career start in place of George Iloka after he suffered a groin injury the previous week. Williams made four combined tackles, deflected a pass, and intercepted a pass by Blaine Gabbert in the Bengals' 24–14 win at the San Francisco 49ers. He finished the 2015 season with 32 combined tackles (25 solo), five pass deflections, and two interceptions in 16 games and four starts.

==== 2016 ====
On May 17, 2016, the Cincinnati Bengals signed Williams to a four-year, $20.18 million contract that includes $4 million guaranteed and a signing bonus of $2 million.

Williams entered training camp as the favorite to win the vacant starting safety role after the Bengals opted not to re-sign Reggie Nelson. Head coach Marvin Lewis officially named him the starting strong safety to begin the regular season, alongside George Iloka.

He started the Cincinnati Bengals' season-opener at the New York Jets and recorded a season-high nine combined tackles in their 23–22 victory. On October 23, 2016, Williams made five combined tackles, a pass deflection, an interception, and his first career sack on quarterback Kevin Hogan during the Bengals 31–17 win against the Cleveland Browns. The following week, Williams collected a season-high nine solo tackles during a 26–26 tie with the Washington Redskins. He missed the Bengals' Week 12 loss at the Baltimore Ravens after he sustained a hamstring injury the previous week. He finished the 2016 season with a career-high 81 combined tackles (59 solo), five pass deflections, two interceptions, and a sack in 15 games and 15 starts. Williams earned an overall grade of 80.6 from Pro Football Focus. His overall grade was the best grade among all of the Bengals' defensive backs and was the 32nd best grade among all of the qualifying safeties in 2016.

==== 2017 ====
On August 19, 2017, Williams made two combined tackles before leaving in the third quarter after sustaining an elbow injury during the Bengals' 30–12 loss to the Kansas City Chiefs in their second preseason game. On August 20, 2017, it was reported that Williams had suffered a dislocated elbow and was expected to miss 4–6 weeks. His elbow recovered in time for him to start in Week 2. In Week 7, Williams collected a season-high seven combined tackles in the Bengals' 29–14 loss at the Pittsburgh Steelers. On November 5, 2017, he made four solo tackles before leaving the Bengals' 23–7 loss at the Jacksonville Jaguars with a hamstring injury. He missed the following game (Week 10) due to the injury. He returned in Week 11 and registered four combined tackles before aggravating his hamstring injury and leaving in the fourth quarter of a 20–17 victory at the Denver Broncos. He missed the next three games (Weeks 12–14) after re-injuring his hamstring. On December 16, 2017, Williams returned and recorded four combined tackles, a pass deflection, and intercepted a pass by Case Keenum during a 34–7 loss at the Minnesota Vikings. He finished the season with 49 combined tackles (31 solo), three pass deflections, and an interception in 11 games and 11 starts. Pro Football Focus gave Williams an overall grade of 79.1, which ranked 40th among all qualifying safeties in 2017.

==== 2018 ====
On September 9, 2018, Williams was ejected after a helmet-to-helmet hit on Andrew Luck during the first quarter of a 34–23 win against the Indianapolis Colts. Michael Johnson was tackling Luck, who was scrambling towards first down yardage on 3rd and 7, when Williams came from the front and collided with Luck helmet-to-helmet. This resulted in a personal foul penalty and Williams' ejection from the game. The very next game, on September 13, he recorded a sack, an interception, and a forced fumble against the Baltimore Ravens, strip-sacking Joe Flacco in the 4th quarter to seal the 34–23 victory.

==== 2019 ====
In Week 12 against the Pittsburgh Steelers, Williams recorded 3 tackles and intercepted his first pass of the season off Mason Rudolph in the 16–10 loss. In Week 16 against the Miami Dolphins, Williams recorded a team high 13 tackles and sacked Ryan Fitzpatrick once during the 38–35 overtime loss.

==== 2020 ====
In Week 13 against the Miami Dolphins, Williams intentionally stepped on Solomon Kindley's foot, and was suspended one game by the NFL for violating the league's unnecessary roughness and unsportsmanlike conduct policies. He was reinstated from suspension on December 14, 2020.

=== Arizona Cardinals ===
On March 31, 2021, Williams signed with the Arizona Cardinals to a one-year contract. He was released on August 31, 2021.

=== Atlanta Falcons ===
On October 5, 2021, Williams was signed to the Atlanta Falcons practice squad. He was promoted to the active roster on December 21.

== NFL career statistics ==
Legend
	Led the league
**Bold**	Career high

=== Regular season ===
Year	Team	Games		Tackles					Interceptions					Fumbles			
Year	Team	GP	GS	Cmb	Solo	Ast	Sck	TFL	Int	Yds	TD	Lng	PD	FF	FR	Yds	TD
2013	CIN	**16**	0	12	8	4	0.0	0	0	0	0	0	0	0	0	0	0
2014	CIN	**16**	0	10	6	4	0.0	0	0	0	0	0	0	0	1	0	0
2015	CIN	**16**	4	32	25	7	0.0	2	2	14	0	14	5	0	0	0	0
2016	CIN	15	15	81	59	22	**1.0**	3	3	14	0	13	5	0	0	0	0
2017	CIN	11	11	49	34	15	0.0	2	1	7	0	7	3	0	**2**	0	0
2018	CIN	**16**	**16**	110	**81**	29	**1.0**	2	**5**	**131**	**1**	**58**	**9**	**1**	0	0	0
2019	CIN	**16**	15	**114**	80	**34**	**1.0**	**5**	1	12	0	12	3	0	0	0	0
2020	CIN	13	0	16	12	4	0.0	0	0	0	0	0	1	0	0	0	0
2021	ATL	6	2	23	13	10	0.0	0	0	0	0	0	0	0	0	0	0
		125	63	447	318	129	3.0	14	12	178	1	58	26	1	3	0	0

=== Playoffs ===
Year	Team	Games		Tackles					Interceptions					Fumbles			
Year	Team	GP	GS	Cmb	Solo	Ast	Sck	TFL	Int	Yds	TD	Lng	PD	FF	FR	Yds	TD
2013	CIN	**1**	0	0	0	0	0.0	0	0	0	0	0	0	0	0	0	0
2014	CIN	**1**	0	1	0	**1**	0.0	0	0	0	0	0	0	0	0	0	0
2015	CIN	**1**	0	**5**	**5**	0	0.0	0	0	0	0	0	0	**1**	0	0	0
		3	0	6	5	1	0.0	0	0	0	0	0	0	1	0	0	0
