= George Iloka =

American football player (born 1990)

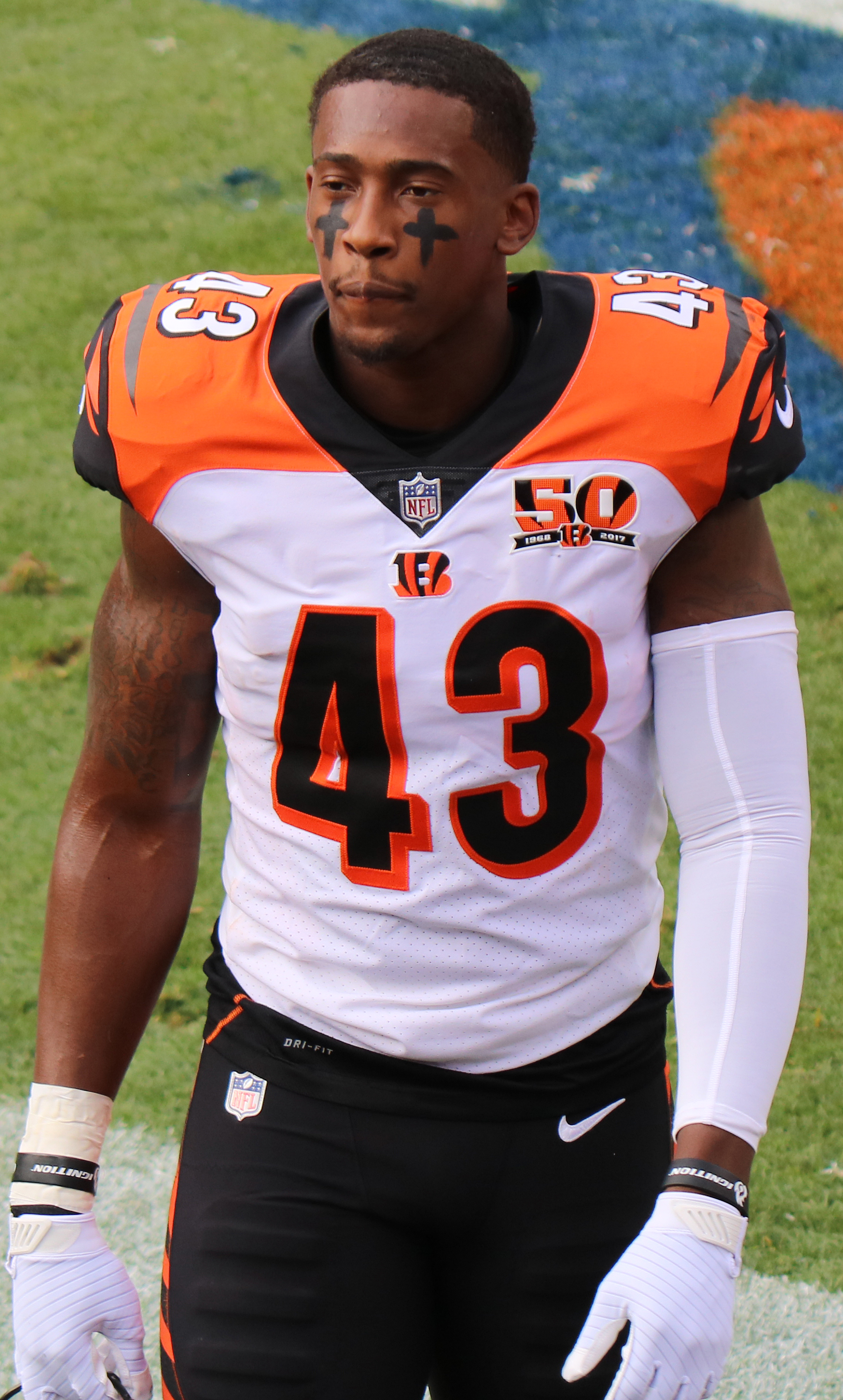
- Iloka with the Bengals in 2017

No. 23, 43
- Position: Safety

Personal information
- Born: March 31, 1990 (age 36); Houston, Texas, U.S.
- Listed height: 6 ft 4 in (1.93 m)
- Listed weight: 225 lb (102 kg)

Career information
- High school: Kempner (Sugar Land, Texas)
- College: Boise State
- NFL draft: 2012: 5th round, 167th overall pick

Career history
- Cincinnati Bengals (2012–2017); Minnesota Vikings (2018); Dallas Cowboys (2019)*; Minnesota Vikings (2020)
- * Offseason or practice squad member only

Awards and highlights
- Third-team All-American (2011); First-team All-MWC (2011)

Career NFL statistics
- Total tackles: 365
- Pass deflections: 32
- Interceptions: 9
- Forced fumbles: 3
- Fumble recoveries: 1
- Stats at Pro Football Reference

George Arinze Iloka (born March 31, 1990) is an American former professional football player who was a safety in the National Football League (NFL). He played college football for the Boise State Broncos and was selected by the Cincinnati Bengals in the fifth round of the 2012 NFL draft.

== College career ==
Iloka attended Boise State University from 2008 to 2011, where he was a three-year starter. In his four years as a Bronco, the team went 50–3 and finished each season ranked 11th or better in the Associated Press (AP) National Poll. In his senior year, Iloka started 11 games at free safety and one at cornerback, helping the Broncos finish 12–1 in 2011. That year, he earned All-MWC first-team honors from league coaches and a trip to the 2012 Senior Bowl; the national attention shot Iloka to the top of many NFL Draft boards. Iloka finished his college career with 231 tackles, 24 passes defensed, seven interceptions and a sack.

In 2008, Iloka was the youngest player in the WAC at 17, and played in every game with five starts for a Bronco team that went 12–0 before losing to TCU in the 2008 Poinsettia Bowl. He compiled 62 tackles (5.0 solo), 10 passes defensed, 4 interceptions, and a sack on the year.

Iloka was an All-WAC selection in 2010.

== Professional career ==
=== Pre-draft ===
On December 30, 2011, Iloka accepted his invitation to play in the 2012 Senior Bowl. On January 28, 2012, Iloka recorded one tackle as part of Minnesota Vikings' head coach Leslie Frazier's North team that defeated the South 23–13 to win the 2012 Senior Bowl. Prior to the NFL Combine, Iloka was ranked as the third best safety prospect in the draft by NFL analyst Mike Mayock. He attended the NFL Scouting Combine in Indianapolis, Indiana and performed all of the combine and positional drills. His combine performance received mixed reviews from scouts and analysts with some stating he had lack of movement and was too large to play safety and other scouts contending Iloka was the consensus third best safety, behind Mark Barron and Harrison Smith, and could possibly elevate to the end of the first round. On March 22, 2012, he attended Boise State's pro day, but opted to stand on his combine numbers and only performed positional drills. Iloka attended pre-draft visits with the Denver Broncos and Seattle Seahawks. At the conclusion of the pre-draft process, Iloka was projected to be a second or third round pick by NFL draft experts and scouts. He was ranked the top free safety prospect in the draft by DraftScout.com, but fell out of NFL analyst Mike Mayock's top five safety rankings. Iloka was also ranked the second best free safety in the draft, behind Markelle Martin, by Bleacher Report.

External videos
- George Iloka's Combine workout

Pre-draft measurables
Height	Weight	Arm length	Hand span	40-yard dash	10-yard split	20-yard split	20-yard shuttle	Three-cone drill	Vertical jump	Broad jump	Bench press
6 ft 3 5/8 in (1.92 m)	225 lb (102 kg)	34 1/2 in (0.88 m)	9 5/8 in (0.24 m)	4.66 s	1.61 s	2.66 s	4.03 s	7.03 s	34 1/2 in (0.88 m)	10 ft 4 in (3.15 m)	20 reps
All values from NFL Combine

=== Cincinnati Bengals ===
==== 2012 ====
The Cincinnati Bengals selected Iloka in the fifth round (167th overall) of the 2012 NFL draft. He was the 11th safety selected in 2012. His fall to the fifth round surprised many and was mainly attributed to concerns over his tackling and his low interception rate in college.

External videos
- Bengals draft George Iloka No. 167

On May 9, 2012, the Cincinnati Bengals signed Iloka to a four-year, $2.26 million contract that includes a signing bonus of $160,300.

Throughout training camp, Iloka competed for the job as the starting strong safety after it was left vacant by the departure of Chris Crocker. He competed against Taylor Mays, Jeromy Miles, Robert Sands, and Tony Dye. Head coach Marvin Lewis named Iloka the backup safety behind Reggie Nelson, Taylor Mays, and Jeromy Miles.

He made his professional regular season debut in the Cincinnati Bengals' season-opening 44–13 loss at the Baltimore Ravens. The following week, he recorded his first career tackle with teammate Roddrick Muckelroy on Josh Cribbs after Cribbs returned a 27-yard kick in the second quarter. He finished the Bengals' 34–27 victory against the Cleveland Browns with two assisted tackles. He finished his rookie season with two tackles in seven games without any starts. As a rookie, Iloka was a healthy scratch for nine games and was solely used on special teams. He was also inactive for the last six consecutive regular season games.

The Cincinnati Bengals finished second in the AFC North with a 10–6 record. On January 5, 2013, Iloka played in his first career playoff game as the Bengals' lost 19–13 at the Houston Texans in the AFC Wildcard Game.

==== 2013 ====
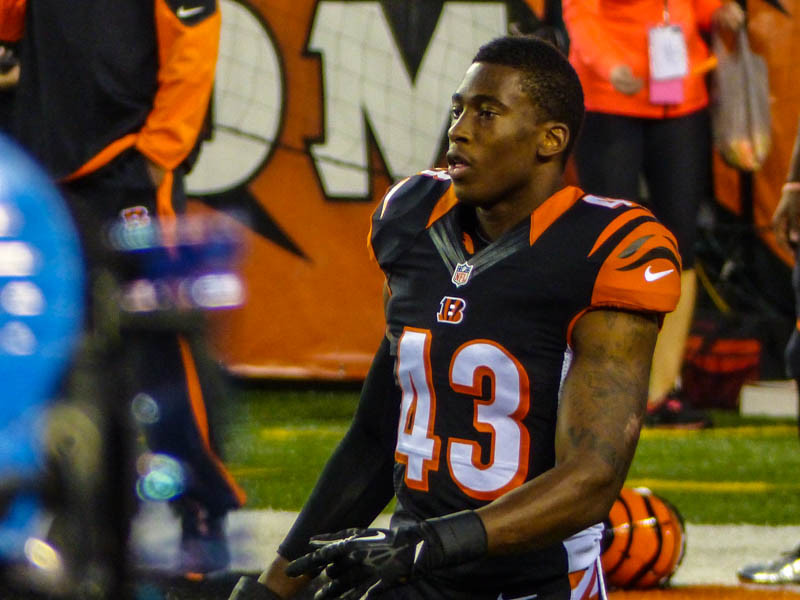
Iloka in 2013

During training camp in 2013, Iloka competed for the job as the starting strong safety against Taylor Mays, Jeromy Miles, and rookie Shawn Williams. Defensive coordinator Mike Zimmer named Iloka the starting strong safety to begin the regular season, along with free safety Reggie Nelson.

He made his first career start in the Cincinnati Bengals' season-opener at the Chicago Bears and recorded four combined tackles in their 24–21 loss. On October 13, 2013, he collected a season-high eight combined tackles in the Bengals' 27–24 win at the Buffalo Bills. In Week 16, Iloka recorded two combined tackles, deflected a pass, and his first career interception off a pass by quarterback Matt Cassel during a 42–14 victory against the Minnesota Vikings. He finished his first season as a full-time starter with 66 combined tackles (41 solo), six pass deflections, two forced fumbles, and an interception in 16 games and 16 starts. Iloka limited quarterbacks to the ninth lowest passer rating among safeties in pass coverage.

The Cincinnati Bengals clinched a playoff berth after finishing atop their division with an 11–5 record. On January 5, 2014, Iloka made his first career start in a playoff game and recorded two combined tackles in a 27–10 loss to the San Diego Chargers.

==== 2014 ====
Iloka entered camp slated as the starting strong safety and saw minor competition from Danieal Manning, Taylor Mays, and Shawn Williams. The Bengals' new defensive coordinator Paul Guenther retained Iloka as the starting strong safety to start the regular season, opposite free safety Reggie Nelson.

In Week 2, Iloka recorded a tackle, three pass deflections, and intercepted two passes by quarterback Matt Ryan during a 24–10 victory against the Atlanta Falcons. On October 5, 2014, Iloka collected a season-high nine combined tackles in the Bengals' 43–17 loss at the New England Patriots. In Week 9, he made five solo tackles, broke up two passes, and an interception during a 33–23 win against the Jacksonville Jaguars. Iloka finished the 2014 season with 74 combined tackles (48 solo), ten pass deflections, and three interceptions in 16 games and 16 starts. He received an overall grade of +3.4 from Pro Football Focus in 2014 and ranked 22nd among all qualifying safeties.

The Cincinnati Bengals finished the season second in the AFC North with a 10–5–1 record and received a wildcard berth. On January 4, 2015, Iloka recorded five combined tackles during a 26–10 loss at the Indianapolis Colts.

==== 2015 ====
Iloka and Nelson returned as the Bengals' starting safety duo to begin the 2015 regular season. He was inactive for the Bengals' Week 4 victory against the Kansas City Chiefs after aggravating an ankle injury he sustained in their season-opener. In Week 10, Iloka collected a season-high ten combined tackles in a 10–6 loss against the Houston Texans. On November 29, 2015, he made four combined tackles, a season-high two pass deflections, and intercepted a pass during a 31–7 win against the St. Louis Rams. The following week, Iloka was inactive due to a groin injury he suffered the previous week. In Week 14, he made one tackle before leaving the Bengals' 33–10 loss against the Pittsburgh Steelers in the second quarter after aggravating his groin injury. He was sidelined for the next two games (Weeks 15–16). Iloka finished the 2015 season with 47 combined tackles (35 solo), four pass deflections, and an interception in 12 games and 12 starts. He had the 15th highest overall grade given by Pro Football Focus among all safeties.

On January 9, 2016, Iloka started in the Cincinnati Bengals' AFC Wildcard Game against the Pittsburgh Steelers and recorded five combined tackles in a closely contested 18–16 loss.

==== 2016 ====
Iloka became an unrestricted free agent after the 2015 season and received serious interest from multiple teams, including the Detroit Lions, Minnesota Vikings, New York Giants, and Atlanta Falcons. He received contract offers from the Cincinnati Bengals, Detroit Lions, and Minnesota Vikings.

On March 9, 2016, the Cincinnati Bengals signed Iloka to a five-year, $30 million contract extension that included $5 million guaranteed and a signing bonus of $3 million.

Head coach named Iloka the starting strong safety with Shawn Williams replacing Reggie Nelson at free safety. On October 23, 2016, Iloka collected a season-high ten combined tackles (eight solo) during a 31–17 victory against the Cleveland Browns. The following week, he made five solo tackles, a pass deflection, and intercepted a pass by Kirk Cousins in the Bengals' 27–27 tie with the Washington Redskins. He finished the 2016 season with 74 combined tackles (49 solo), seven pass deflections, and a career-high three interceptions in 16 games and 16 starts. He received an overall grade of 75.0 from Pro Football Focus and ranked 53rd among all qualifying safeties.

==== 2017 ====
On December 4, 2017, Iloka recorded five combined tackles during the Bengals' 23–20 loss to the Pittsburgh Steelers on Monday Night Football. He received a penalty for unnecessary roughness after a helmet-to-helmet hit on Antonio Brown as Brown was making a touchdown reception in the endzone. The following day, Iloka was suspended for one game for the hit on Brown. On December 6, 2017, he appealed his suspension and had his penalty reduced to a $35,464.50 fine. In Week 14, Iloka recorded a season-high eight combined tackles during a 33–7 loss to the Chicago Bears. He finished the 2017 season with a career-high 80 combined tackles (54 solo), five pass deflections, and an interception in 16 games and 16 starts. Pro Football Focus gave Iloka an overall grade of 77.7, ranking him 45th among all safeties in 2017.

Iloka was released by the Bengals on August 19, 2018.

=== Minnesota Vikings (first stint) ===
Three days after his release, he was signed by the Minnesota Vikings. The move reunited him with Mike Zimmer, who was the Bengals' defensive coordinator during Iloka's tenure with the Bengals.

=== Dallas Cowboys ===
On March 23, 2019, Iloka signed a one-year contract with the Dallas Cowboys. On August 30, 2019, Iloka was released by the Cowboys.

=== Minnesota Vikings (second stint) ===
After sitting out the 2019 NFL season, Iloka had a tryout with the Vikings on August 21, 2020. On September 17, 2020, Iloka was signed to the Vikings' practice squad. He was elevated to the active roster on September 26 and October 3 for the team's weeks 3 and 4 games against the Tennessee Titans and Houston Texans, and reverted to the practice squad after each game. He was promoted to the active roster on October 10, 2020. He was placed on injured reserve on October 22, 2020.

== NFL career statistics ==
Legend
**Bold**	Career high

=== Regular season ===
Year	Team	Games		Tackles					Interceptions					Fumbles			
Year	Team	GP	GS	Cmb	Solo	Ast	Sck	TFL	Int	Yds	TD	Lng	PD	FF	FR	Yds	TD
2012	CIN	7	0	2	0	2	0.0	0	0	0	0	0	0	0	0	0	0
2013	CIN	**16**	**16**	66	41	25	0.0	0	1	-1	0	-1	6	**2**	**1**	0	0
2014	CIN	**16**	**16**	74	48	**26**	0.0	2	**3**	**58**	0	**28**	**10**	0	0	0	0
2015	CIN	12	12	47	35	12	0.0	2	1	0	0	0	4	0	0	0	0
2016	CIN	**16**	**16**	74	49	25	0.0	1	**3**	21	0	21	7	0	0	0	0
2017	CIN	**16**	**16**	**80**	**54**	**26**	0.0	**4**	1	14	0	14	5	0	0	0	0
2018	MIN	**16**	3	16	14	2	0.0	0	0	0	0	0	0	1	0	0	0
2020	MIN	4	0	6	5	1	0.0	1	0	0	0	0	0	0	0	0	0
		103	79	365	246	119	0.0	10	9	92	0	28	32	3	1	0	0

=== Playoffs ===
Year	Team	Games		Tackles					Interceptions					Fumbles			
Year	Team	GP	GS	Cmb	Solo	Ast	Sck	TFL	Int	Yds	TD	Lng	PD	FF	FR	Yds	TD
2012	CIN	**1**	0	0	0	0	0.0	0	0	0	0	0	0	0	0	0	0
2013	CIN	**1**	**1**	2	2	0	0.0	0	0	0	0	0	0	0	0	0	0
2014	CIN	**1**	**1**	**5**	2	**3**	0.0	0	0	0	0	0	0	0	0	0	0
2015	CIN	**1**	**1**	**5**	**4**	1	0.0	**1**	0	0	0	0	0	0	**1**	0	0
		4	3	12	8	4	0.0	1	0	0	0	0	0	0	1	0	0

== Personal life ==
Iloka attended Kempner High School in Sugar Land, Texas. His younger brother, Kenny Iloka, played collegiate football at TCU and went undrafted as a safety in the 2016 NFL draft.

The son of immigrants, he is of Nigerian descent.
