= Orson Charles =

American football player (born 1991)

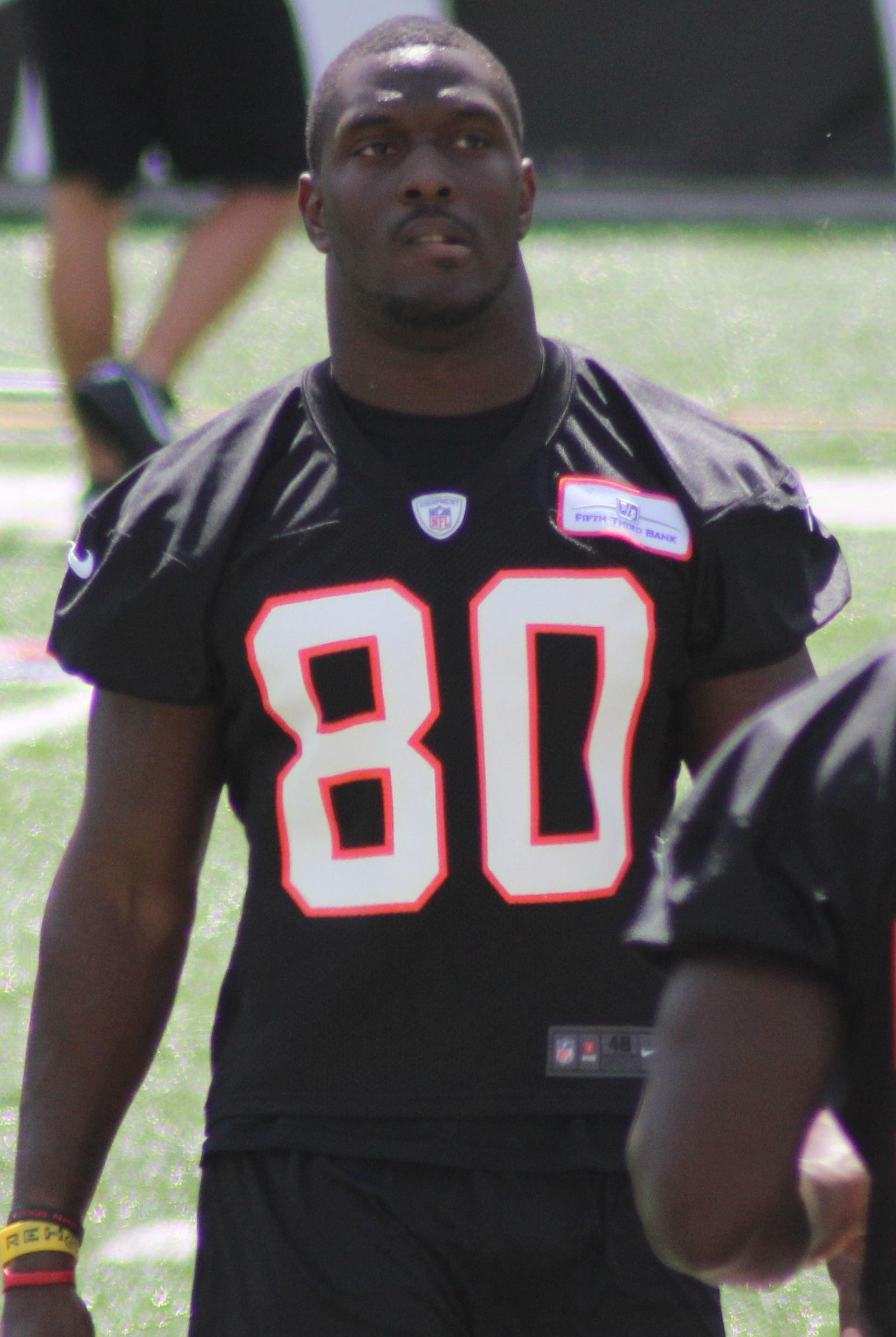
- Charles with the Cincinnati Bengals in 2012

No. 80, 82, 84
- Positions: Tight end, fullback

Personal information
- Born: January 27, 1991 (age 35); Tampa, Florida, U.S.
- Listed height: 6 ft 3 in (1.91 m)
- Listed weight: 257 lb (117 kg)

Career information
- High school: Henry B. Plant (Tampa)
- College: Georgia
- NFL draft: 2012: 4th round, 116th overall pick

Career history
- Cincinnati Bengals (2012–2013); Tennessee Titans (2014)*; New Orleans Saints (2014–2015)*; Detroit Lions (2016); Kansas City Chiefs (2017); Cleveland Browns (2018); Denver Broncos (2019)
- * Offseason or practice squad member only

Awards and highlights
- First-team All-American (2011); First-team All-SEC (2011); Second-team All-SEC (2010)

Career NFL statistics
- Receptions: 14
- Receiving yards: 185
- Receiving average: 13.2
- Stats at Pro Football Reference

Orson Charles (born January 27, 1991) is an American former professional football player who was a tight end and fullback in the National Football League (NFL). He played college football for the Georgia Bulldogs, earning first-team All-American honors as a tight end in 2011. Charles was selected by the Bengals in the fourth round of the 2012 NFL draft.

== Early life ==
Charles attended Riverview High School before transferring to Henry B. Plant High School in Tampa, Florida for his senior year, where he was a teammate of Aaron Murray. During a recruiting visit to the University of Florida in 2008, Charles accidentally dropped the school's 2006 National Championship Trophy, breaking the Waterford Crystal football. He played in the 2009 U.S. Army All-American Bowl.

== College career ==
Charles was named a finalist for the 2011 John Mackey Award on November 21, 2011.

== Professional career ==
Pre-draft measurables
| Height | Weight | Arm length | Hand span | 40-yard dash | 10-yard split | 20-yard split | 20-yard shuttle | Vertical jump | Broad jump | Bench press |
|---|---|---|---|---|---|---|---|---|---|---|
| 6 ft 2 1/2 in (1.89 m) | 251 lb (114 kg) | 32 1/2 in (0.83 m) | 9 1/4 in (0.23 m) | 4.73 s | 1.66 s | 2.72 s | 4.37 s | 30.5 in (0.77 m) | 9 ft 5 in (2.87 m) | 35 reps |
All values from NFL Combine/Pro Day

=== Cincinnati Bengals ===
Charles was selected by the Cincinnati Bengals in the fourth round, 116th overall, of the 2012 NFL draft. In his rookie season, he played all 16 games, starting 6 of them, accumulating 8 receptions for 101 yards. In 2013 Charles played primarily at fullback; He played 13 games but started none and recorded one catch for eight yards.

=== Tennessee Titans ===
Charles was signed to the practice squad of the Tennessee Titans on September 1, 2014. He was released on September 9, 2014.

=== New Orleans Saints ===
On September 23, 2014, Charles was signed to the New Orleans Saints practice squad.

=== Detroit Lions ===
On June 16, 2016, Charles was signed by the Detroit Lions. He was released on October 4, 2016.

=== Kansas City Chiefs ===
On May 31, 2017, Charles signed with the Kansas City Chiefs. He was waived on September 2, 2017 and was signed to the Chiefs' practice squad the next day. He was released on October 7, 2017. He was re-signed to the practice squad on October 25, 2017. He was promoted to the active roster on November 28, 2017. He was waived by the Chiefs on May 3, 2018.

=== Cleveland Browns ===
On July 30, 2018, Charles signed with the Cleveland Browns. He made the Browns final roster as the team's fourth tight end. Despite being listed as a tight end, Charles had lined up primarily as a fullback throughout the 2018 season. He appeared on the 2018 Pro Bowl ballot as a fullback, and Browns coaches have signaled they view him as such. The Browns placed Charles on injured reserve with an ankle injury on December 13, 2018.

On April 3, 2019, Charles re-signed with the Browns. The Browns waived Charles on August 11, 2019.

=== Denver Broncos ===
On August 21, 2019, Charles signed with the Denver Broncos. He was released on August 31, 2019. He was re-signed on November 19, 2019, but was released three days later.

Charles was drafted in the 6th round of the 2020 XFL Draft by the DC Defenders, but did not sign with the team.

== Legal troubles ==
Shortly before the 2012 NFL Draft, Charles was arrested for a DUI.

On March 31, 2014, Charles was arrested for wanton endangerment in Richmond, Kentucky. Charles was pulled over by a police officer after another driver called in a complaint that Charles had shown a gun multiple times. In February 2015 Charles pleaded guilty to wanton endangerment and will enter a diversion program.

On July 16, 2022, Charles was arrested for pulling a gun on off-duty police officers in Tampa, Florida.
