= Taylor Mays =

American football player (born 1988)

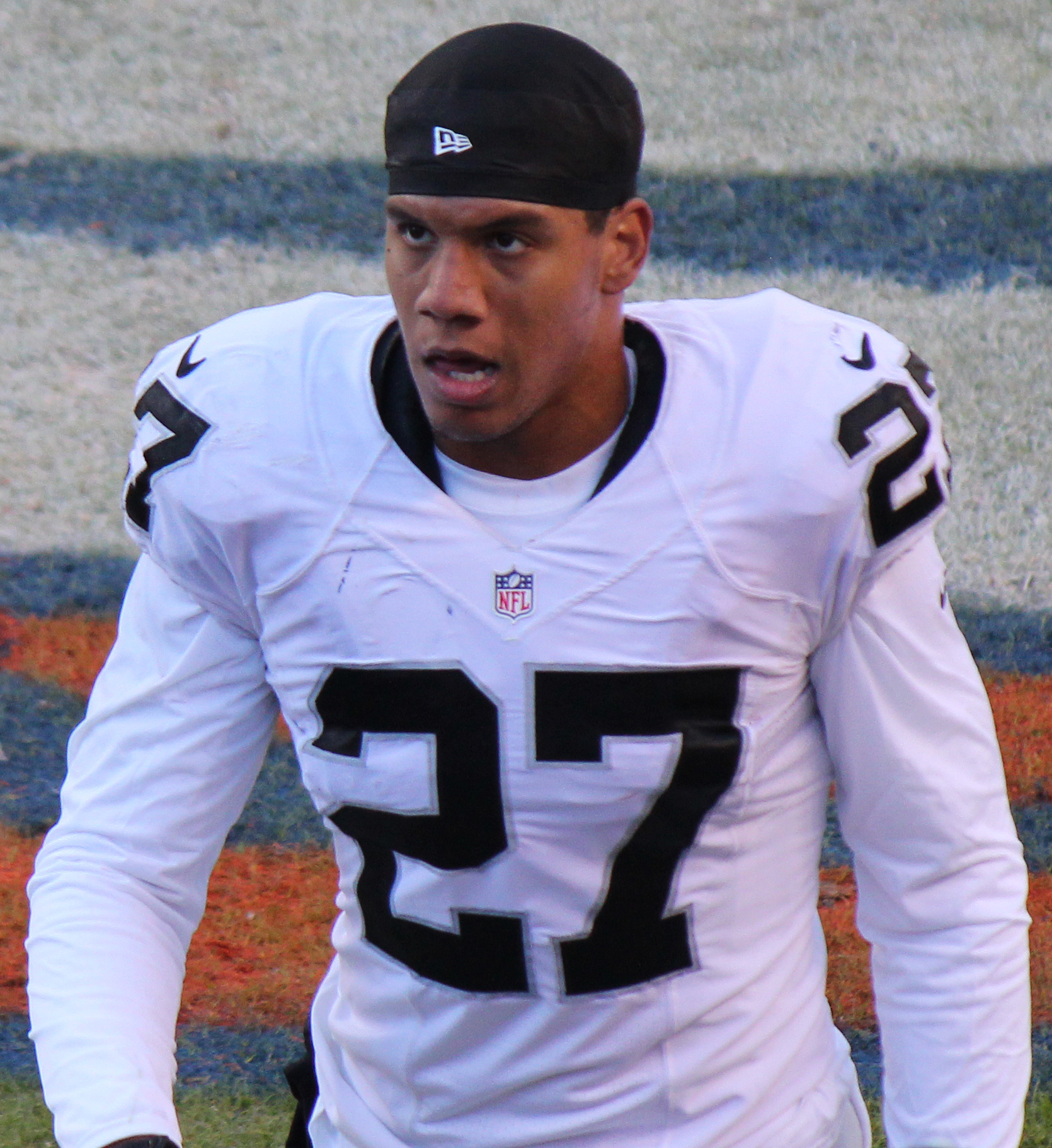
- Mays with the Oakland Raiders in 2015

Washington Huskies
- Title: Safeties coach

Personal information
- Born: February 7, 1988 (age 38); Seattle, Washington, U.S.
- Listed height: 6 ft 3 in (1.91 m)
- Listed weight: 236 lb (107 kg)

Career information
- High school: O'Dea (Seattle)
- College: USC (2006–2009)
- NFL draft: 2010: 2nd round, 49th overall pick

Career history

Playing
- San Francisco 49ers (2010); Cincinnati Bengals (2011–2014); Minnesota Vikings (2015)*; Detroit Lions (2015)*; Oakland Raiders (2015); Cincinnati Bengals (2016)*; Saskatchewan Roughriders (2017)
- * Offseason or practice squad member only

Coaching
- USC (2022–2024) Defensive analyst; Washington (2025–present) Safeties coach

Awards and highlights
- 3× First-team All-American (2007–2009); Second-team All-American (2006); 2× First-team All-Pac-10 (2008, 2009); Pac-10 Co-Freshman of the Year (2006)

Career NFL statistics
- Total tackles: 124
- Sacks: 1.0
- Forced fumbles: 1
- Fumble recoveries: 2
- Total touchdowns: 1
- Stats at Pro Football Reference

Taylor Mays (born February 7, 1988) is an American former professional football player who was a safety in the National Football League (NFL). He won Washington state titles in track in both the 100-meter dash and 200-meter dash as a high school sophomore, before leaving track and field to dedicate himself to football. He played college football for the USC Trojans, and was a three-time first-team All-American. He was selected by the San Francisco 49ers in the second round of the 2010 NFL draft and also played in the NFL for the Cincinnati Bengals and Oakland Raiders, playing in 66 regular season NFL games.

== Early life ==
Mays was born in Seattle, Washington, the son of Stafford Mays, a former NFL defensive tackle, and Laurie Mays (née Black), a Nordstrom executive. He is African-American and Jewish and was raised in his mother's Jewish religion. Growing up he attended Sunday school from a young age, and then Hebrew school twice a week. He had a football-themed bar mitzvah in February 2001. Speaking of his bar mitzvah, he said: "I don't think at the time I really understood what it meant. Now, looking back on it, I feel like I have come a long way in regards to maturity and becoming an adult. I think it helped me do that". Growing up, he "celebrated Chanukah, Passover, and Yom Kippur always".

His father played defensive tackle for the University of Washington in the late 1970s, and was later drafted in the ninth round of the 1980 NFL draft by the then-St. Louis Cardinals and later played for the Minnesota Vikings from 1987 to 1988. His mother worked as an executive vice president at Nordstrom, and his father, Stafford, worked as a Microsoft executive.

From a young age, Mays always had a deep desire to play football; his father recalls Mays, at age 14, doing homework with his football helmet on. Mays also spent a lot of time as a kid watching old football tapes from when his father played. While his parents initially didn't allow him to play football, he played soccer and was noted as being very physical and much bigger than the other kids which led to his parents eventually letting him try out for the football team in the 7th grade.

=== High school career ===
Mays attended O'Dea High School, a Catholic boys high school located in Seattle, Washington's First Hill neighborhood in the 98104 zip code. Before playing football, Mays joined the track & field team to work on his speed. As a sophomore at O'Dea in 2004, Mays won both the 100-meter dash (10.54 s) and 200-meter dash (21.64 s) titles in the 3A State championships in the spring of 2004 before leaving track behind after his junior year to dedicate his last year in high school to prepare for football at the next level.

As a junior in 2004, he posted 124 tackles, 5 interceptions and 75 deflections, catching 25 passes for 700 yards (640 m) with 23 touchdowns and returning 12 punts for 392 yards (358 m) with 10 touchdowns while earning Student Sports Junior All-American honors as a safety, wide receiver and quarterback. His final year at O'Dea, he collected 166 tackles, 5 interceptions and 5 pass deflections as a safety while catching 36 passes for 765 yards (700 m) and 15 touchdowns. As a senior in 2005, he was named All-State First team and All-Metro League Mountain Division Offensive MVP and Defensive Co-MVP. He also returned 12 punts for 392 yards (358 m) and 3 touchdowns. Mays played for the West Team in the 2006 U.S. Army All-American Bowl game alongside future USC teammates Mitch Mustain and Stafon Johnson. He posted three tackles in the game.

On May 21, 2005, Mays participated in the 2005 Palo Alto Nike, Inc. Training Camp. Listed at 6'3", 218-pounds, Mays ran a 4.59 in the 40 yard dash, recorded 21 reps of 185 pounds on bench press and posted a 31" vertical jump. By age 17, Mays was 6' 3", 228-pounds.

=== Recruiting ===
Rivals.com listed Mays as the No. 1 overall prospect in the state of Washington in 2006. While considering offers from USC, Washington and Miami, Mays elected to commit to the University of Southern California after being recruited by defensive back coaches Rocky Seto and Greg Burns. Mays was expected to attend Washington in the footsteps of his father, but didn't want to fall under his father's shadow and decided to build his own legacy while citing Pete Carroll's enthusiasm and coaching style as a major factor in his decision, officially committing on August 14, 2005.

== College career ==
Mays received an athletic scholarship to attend the University of Southern California, where he played for head coach Pete Carroll's USC Trojans football team from 2006 to 2009.

=== 2006 season ===
Mays got the start at free safety his freshman year after Josh Pinkard went down with a season ending injury in their first game against Arkansas. His first college career interception came in week 5 against Washington State. Throughout the year he was a solid safety recording 62 tackles in only 12 starts and an ended the year leading his team in interceptions with 3. In 2006, Mays became the third player in Trojan history to be named the Pac-10's Co-Freshman of The Year while also earning Second team All-American, 1st team Freshman All-American and Defensive Freshman of the Year honors from Sporting News magazine.

Mays surprised a lot of people throughout the nation when it was stated by Pete Carroll that the 6' 3", 230-pound freshman was the fastest player on a top-tier team built with some of the speediest players in the nation. Teammate running back Joe McKnight stated: "He's faster than me. I wish I had it, whatever he has." According to Carroll, Mays was clocked at an astonishing 4.25 in the 40-yard (37 m) dash, .01 seconds slower than the record set at the 2008 NFL Combine by Tennessee Titans running back Chris Johnson. Mays also said that he models his game after former USC safety and Pro Football Hall of Fame safety Ronnie Lott and the late Washington Redskins safety Sean Taylor: "He's been my favorite player. I look up to (former USC safety) Ronnie Lott, too. That's what's special being in this program, living up to the safeties here."

Mays switched from No. 29 to No. 2 after his freshman season for former Florida State player Deion Sanders and former Michigan player Charles Woodson who both wore the number while playing defensive back in college.

=== 2007 season ===
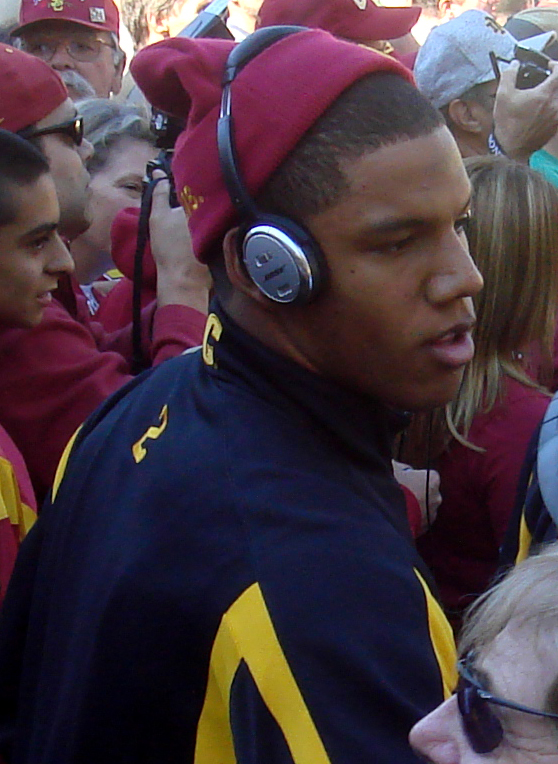
Mays before 2007 Notre Dame game.

After Josh Pinkard was re-positioned to cornerback, Mays returned as the team's starting safety alongside All-Pac-10 strong safety Kevin Ellison, whom he credits as his mentor. His most impressive game of the season came during week 10 against California, where he posted 10 tackles and deflected 3 passes which helped hold one of the best offenses in the nation 14 points below its average in the 24–17 win. He also had a career-high 12 tackles in week 8 against the Oregon.

Mays finished third on the team with 65 total tackles, 6 pass deflections, 1 forced fumble, and 1 interception in 13 games in 2007. He earned Third-team All-American honors from the Associated Press, First-team All-American honors from Sporting News, and All-Pac-10 honorable mention.

After the 2007 season, Mays was listed by ESPN The Magazine in an article titled "Workout Warriors", honoring college football's most physically talented players. According to the article, in the USC spring practices in 2008, Mays posted unbelievable numbers: Measured at 6' 3", 226-pounds with 6% body fat, Mays ran an electronically timed 4.32 40-yard dash, threw up 225-pounds 23 times during the bench press, and recorded a 41" vertical jump and an 11' 4" standing broad jump. When he arrived at USC, Mays weighed 215-pounds, posted a 35" vertical and 10' standing broad jump. Mays was listed at the No. 2 spot behind Texas defensive end Brian Orakpo.

=== 2008 season ===
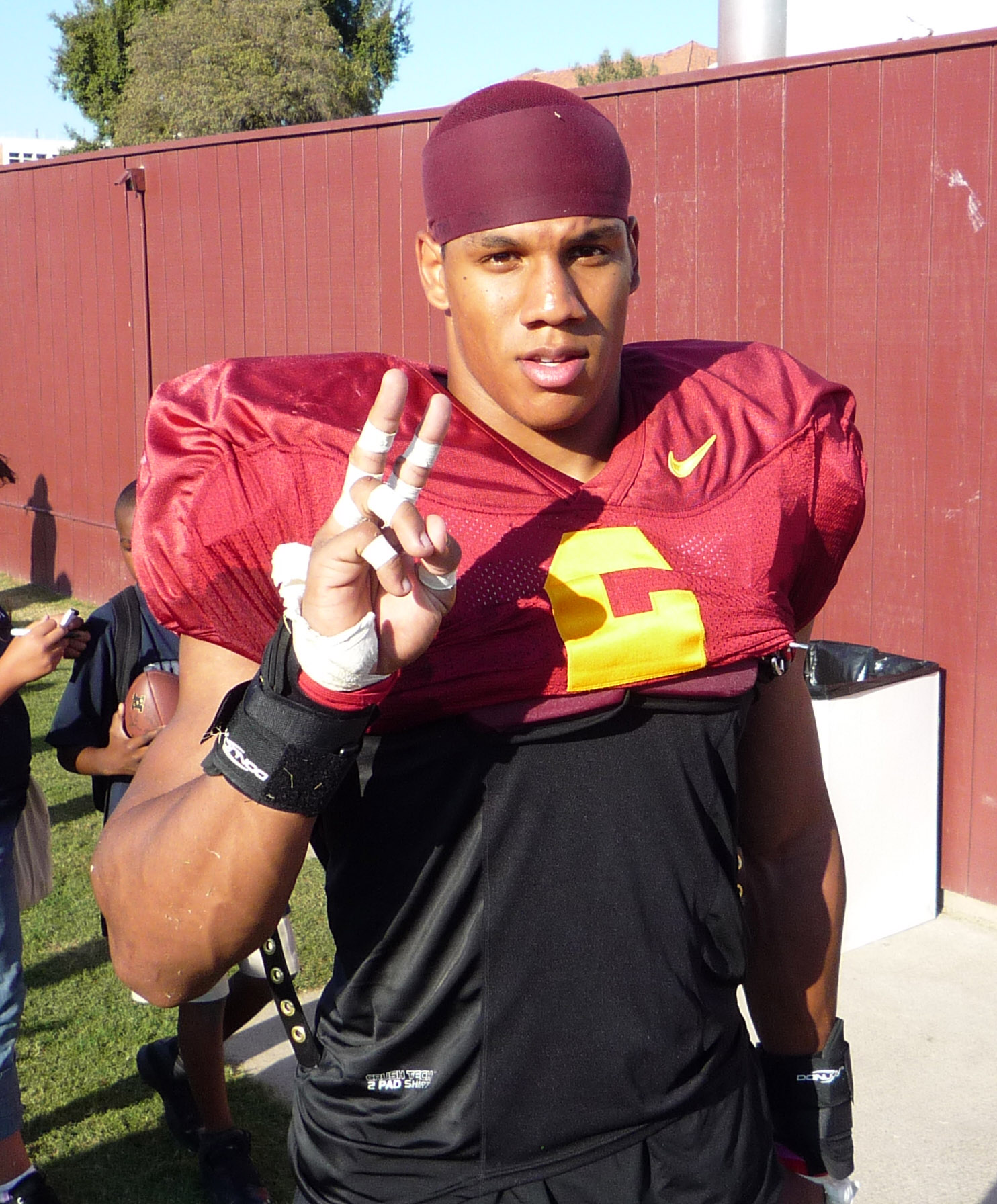
Taylor Mays

Before the start of the 2008 season, Mays was honored with a 2008 Preseason All-American selection and was on the early watch list for both the Bronko Nagurski Trophy, awarded to the best defensive player in the nation, and the Lott Trophy. Mays stated in a Los Angeles Times interview on November 10 that he would decide whether or not to forfeit his senior year at USC to enter the 2009 NFL draft after the 2008 post season, saying that a big factor in his decision would come from his father and head coach Pete Carroll. Mays entered 2008 as one of the top safety prospects in the nation.

The USC defense turned in the second-best defense in the nation, and some argued one of the best college has ever seen. Through the air, the USC defense held opposing offenses to only 6 touchdowns while collecting 19 interceptions as the best pass defense in the nation, with Mays being a key factor in their success. Though he didn't register an interception throughout his junior season, Mays had a team-leading 8 pass deflections with four of them coming in a week 9 matchup against California which averaged almost 40 points per game to that point. Mays had a spectacular performance in the game, delivering several big hits which jarred balls loose from the receivers' hands. What would have been Mays' first interception of the season was called back on a penalty by Kaluka Maiava. Through regular season play, Mays collected 53 total tackles and 8 pass deflections. The Trojans would go on to face Penn State in the 2009 Rose Bowl, where the defense shut down one of the most explosive offenses in the country in the 38–24 win. A memorable play in the game by Mays was a devastating helmet-to-helmet hit on wide receiver Jordan Norwood which momentarily knocked Norwood out of the game and incidentally his teammate Kevin Thomas as well.

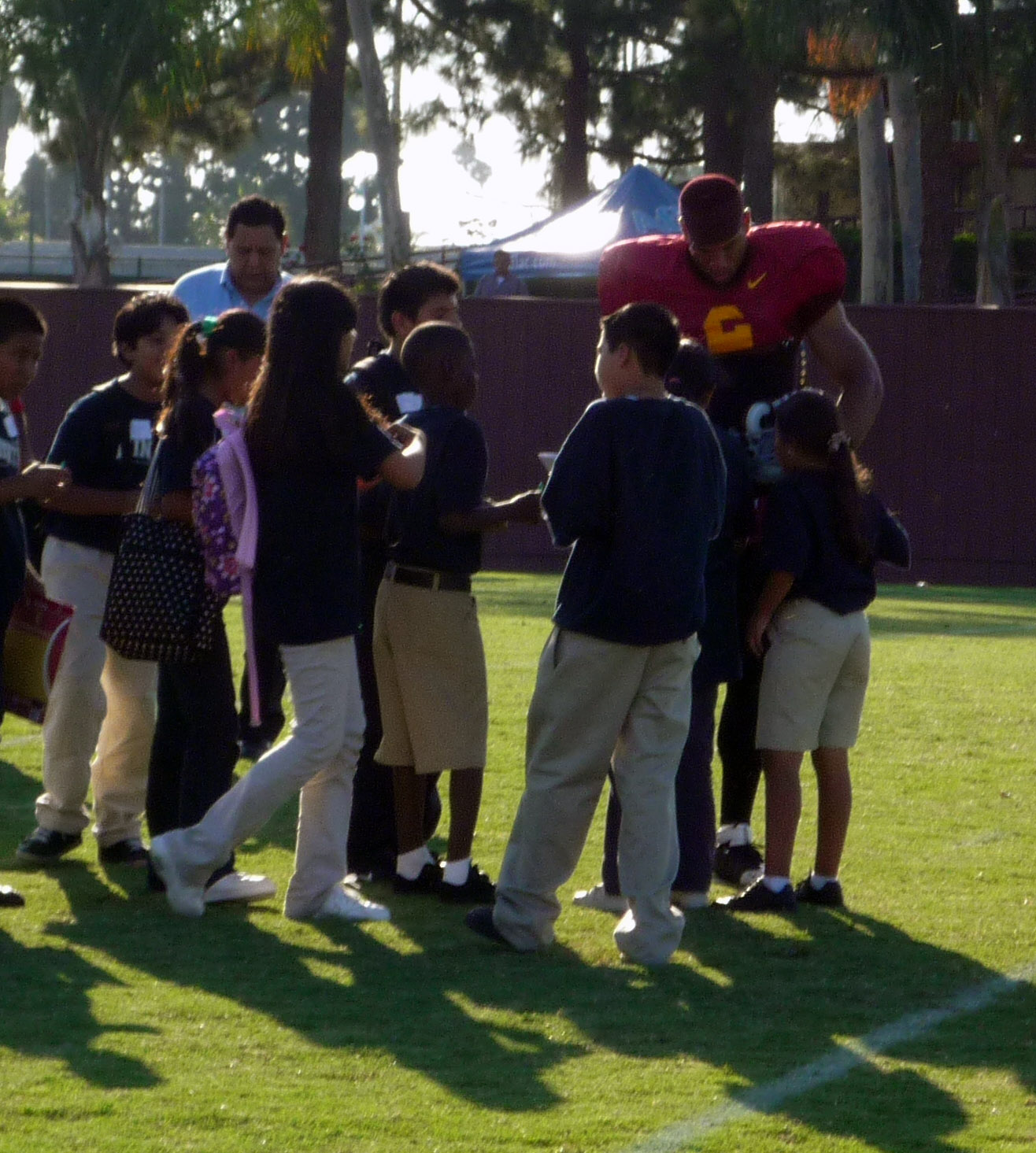
Mays signs autographs for school children after a USC practice in fall 2008.

Mays ended his junior season as a finalist for the Jim Thorpe Award after being beaten out by Ohio State cornerback Malcolm Jenkins. He finished 3rd in the running, coming in behind Jenkins and Tennessee safety Eric Berry. He earned First-Team All-American honors from several sources such as Sporting News, Walter Camp Football, and the Associated Press as well as Second-Team All-American honors by Rivals.com and All-Pac-10 First-Team honors.

On January 13, two days before the deadline for college players to declare for the Draft, Mays announced that he would return to USC for his last year. Mays was regarded as unanimous first-round pick in the 2009 NFL Draft but opted to return to continue to develop and to complete his education at Southern California, citing the importance of graduating to himself and his parents as well as giving his last shot at leading USC to the BCS National Championship.

=== 2009 season ===
In a Lindy's Football article, Mays stated that he wanted to play a different role in the defensive secondary that would call him to be more involved in the action. "I want to be closer to the action. People who know football know what my role on the defense is, but I'd like to be more involved this season", Mays said. The usual duties of a free safety in Pete Carroll's defense calls for him to be a center fielder preventing plays being made deep downfield, keeping him from doing much else in the box. Carroll said he agreed to tweak Mays' duties for the 2009 season, Mays' last at USC. In his last season with the Trojans, one ending with the roughest record (8–4) of his 4-year tenure at USC, he tallied a career-high 96 total tackles for the season while adding another interception to his career total.

In October, he was named a midseason All-American by The Sporting News. The withdrawal of several key players from last year's Trojans team was heavily felt on the defensive side of the ball, with Mays and the secondary surrendering 211.5 passing yards per game, 126 more yards than the defense surrendered in 2008. The lack of playmaking and leadership-by-performance from Mays has led experts to quote his stock for the upcoming NFL draft as one that is heavily slipping, though his pre-draft workouts are expected to impress NFL managers the league over. Mays was named First-team All-Pac 10 for the second year in a row and was named First-team All-America for the third consecutive season.

== Professional career ==
=== Pre-draft ===
Prior to his first season, Mays was considered one of the top talents for the 2010 NFL draft and frequently drew comparisons to Adrian Wilson for his size and Sean Taylor for his hitting ability, . Mays participated in the 2010 Senior Bowl, but played sparingly, making his interception of Cincinnati quarterback Tony Pike in the second quarter being his only highlight. According to Sports Illustrated's Tony Pauline, Mays "looked stiff and mechanical with his defensive back fundamentals and really showed limited skills in pass coverage drills", and was therefore projected to outside linebacker by some teams. However, during an interview with Steve Wyche of NFL Network, Mays said that the NFL teams he was interviewed by during the 2010 NFL Combine processes never mentioned him switching positions, but that he would be willing do so if need be. As a top safety prospect he received an invitation to the NFL Scouting Combine and ran the 40-yard dash in 4.43 seconds, the fastest time among safeties. Although it could have been considerably faster, as he clocked an unofficial time of 4.24 seconds. He attended the combine and completed the majority of drills, but opted to skip the three-cone drill and short shuttle. On March 31, 2010, Mays participated at USC's pro day, but only ran positional drills for team representatives and scouts in attendance. At the conclusion of the pre-draft process, Mays was projected to be a second round pick by the majority of NFL draft experts and scouts. He fell from his top ten and first round grade the previous year, due to concerns over his coverage ability and lack of perceived drive to work on his weaknesses. He was ranked the second best free safety prospect available by NFLDraftScout.com.

Pre-draft measurables
Height	Weight	Arm length	Hand span	40-yard dash	10-yard split	20-yard split	20-yard shuttle	Three-cone drill	Vertical jump	Broad jump	Bench press	Wonderlic
6 ft 3 1/8 in (1.91 m)	230 lb (104 kg)	34 in (0.86 m)	10 1/4 in (0.26 m)	4.43 s	1.56 s	2.58 s	4.24 s	6.98 s	41.0 in (1.04 m)	10 ft 5 in (3.18 m)	24 reps	22
All values from NFL Combine/Pro Day

=== San Francisco 49ers ===
The San Francisco 49ers selected Mays in the second round (49th overall) of the 2010 NFL draft. Mays was the fifth safety drafted in 2010, behind Eric Berry, Earl Thomas, Nate Allen, and T. J. Ward. In an interview with the Sacramento Bee′s Matt Barrows following the draft, Mays suggested that Seattle Seahawks head coach Pete Carroll led him to believe that the Seahawks would select him with the 14th overall pick, which they instead used to pick another safety, Texas' Earl Thomas. "I understand it's a business. But with it being a business, he needs to be honest. And that's all I was asking for", Mays said.

In a post-draft interview, San Francisco 49ers executive Trent Baalke insisted that, despite the addition of Mays, then-current veteran strong safety Michael Lewis would be the starter for the 2010 season. On July 30, 2010, Mays signed a four-year contract with the 49ers.

After spending the entirety of the first three games on special teams, coach Mike Singletary benched then-starting strong safety Lewis in favor of Reggie Smith and Mays who split time at the spot in the team's Week 4 match-up against the Atlanta Falcons. While garnering a team-high 11 tackles in the game, Mays' most outstanding play of the game was a special teams touchdown made off of a deflected punt. After the game, Mays was named the indefinite starter at strong safety alongside free safety.

=== Cincinnati Bengals (first stint) ===
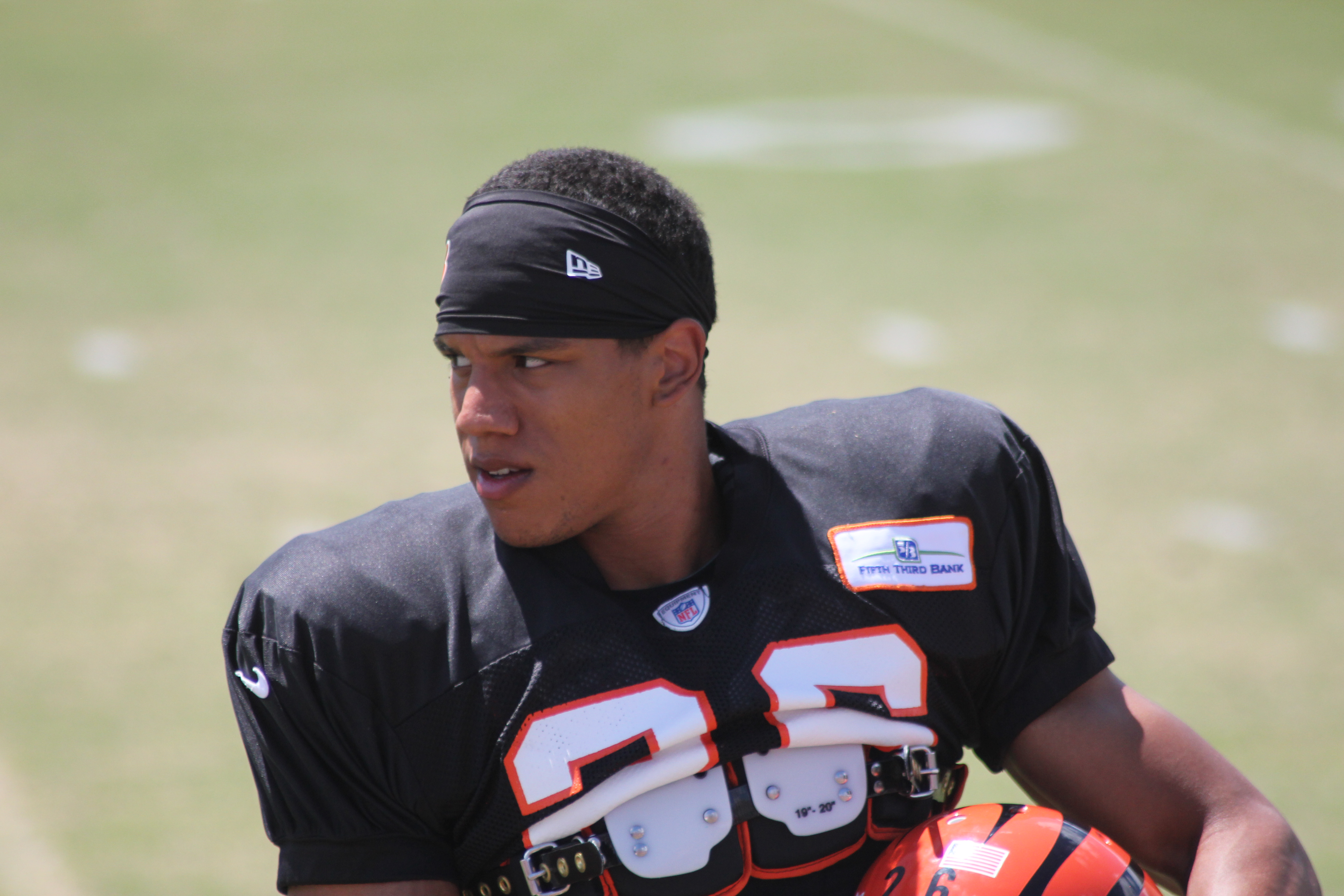
Mays at Cincinnati Bengals training camp in 2013.

On August 22, 2011, Mays was traded to the Cincinnati Bengals for a seventh round pick in the 2013 NFL draft. His trade after being drafted in the second round a year prior was questioned and was due to Singletary's firing by Baalke. Mays was selected solely on Singletary's choice and the majority of the 49er's organization decided a safety wasn't a need at that time.

In 2012, he played in all 16 games, starting 3 of them.

In the 2013 season, he played 203 snaps. After the 2013 season, the Bengals re-signed Mays to a one-year $755,000 deal, with a $40,000 signing bonus.

On March 11, 2014, the Bengals re-signed Mays. He played in all 16 games for the Bengals in 2014.

Through the 2014 season, he started 10 of the 16 games he played, with 98 tackles on defense (71 solo) and 6 pass-breakups. He had 21 tackles on special teams with the Bengals. He primarily played on special teams, and was also used at both safety positions as well as at linebacker.

=== Minnesota Vikings ===
Mays signed with the Minnesota Vikings on March 24, 2015. He was released on June 16.

=== Detroit Lions ===
The Detroit Lions signed Mays on June 22, 2015. The team released him on August 21.

=== Oakland Raiders ===
On August 25, 2015, Mays signed with the Oakland Raiders. He was released on September 5 for final roster cuts.

On September 14, 2015, Mays re-signed with the Raiders due to starting safeties, Nate Allen and Charles Woodson both sustaining injuries in the first regular season game.

=== Cincinnati Bengals (second stint) ===
On March 17, 2016, the Bengals signed Mays as a free agent to a one-year, $840,000 contract. Three days prior, the NFL suspended Mays for the first four games of the 2016 NFL season for violating the league's substance abuse policy. On July 23, Mays was released by the Bengals after learning that he would be dealt an additional suspension for violating the NFL's substance abuse policy again.

=== Saskatchewan Roughriders ===
On October 9, 2017, Mays was added to the Saskatchewan Roughriders of the West Division of the Canadian Football League (CFL), and he played one game for them the following month. Mays was released in April 2018.

== Career statistics ==
=== NFL ===
Year	Team	Games		Tackles					Interceptions						Fumbles	
Year	Team	GP	GS	Comb	Total	Ast	Sck	SFTY	PDef	Int	Yds	Avg	Lng	TD	FF	FR
2010	SF	16	6	38	31	7	0.0	0	2	--	--	0.0	--	--	1	--
2011	CIN	10	0	10	7	3	9	--	1	--	--	0.0	--	--	0	--
2012	CIN	16	3	22	14	8	0.0	--	0	--	--	0.0	--	--	0	1
2013	CIN	8	1	19	12	7	0.0	--	3	--	--	0.0	--	--	0	1
2014	CIN	16	0	9	7	2	1.0	1	0	--	--	0.0	--	--	0	--
2015	OAK	14	5	26	18	8	0.0	--	5	--	--	0.0	--	--	0	--

=== College ===
Season	Team	Games		Tackles					Interceptions					Fumbles			
Season	Team	GP	GS	Solo	Ast	Comb	TFL	Sk	Int	Yards	Avg	TD	PD	FF	FR	Yards	TD
2006	USC	13	12	38	24	62	0	0.0	3	40	13.3	0	6	0	0	0	0
2007	USC	13	13	36	29	65	0	0.0	1	0	0.0	0	7	1	1	0	0
2008	USC	13	13	38	15	53	2	0.0	0	0	0.0	0	9	0	0	0	0
2009	USC	12	12	48	48	96	0	0.0	1	0	0.0	0	4	0	0	0	0
Career		51	50	160	116	276	2	0.0	5	40	8.0	0	26	1	1	0	0

== Coaching career ==
Following Mays' playing career he became a defensive analyst for USC in 2022.

Mays was promoted to interim safeties coach in December 2023 when Donte Williams accepted the safeties coach position at Georgia. Mays' work with the USC secondary players was credited for their much improved tackling in the 2023 Holiday Bowl in San Diego.

In January 2025, Mays was named the safeties coach at Washington.

== Honors ==
On June 26, 2011, he was inducted into the Southern California Jewish Sports Hall of Fame. In 2018, he was inducted into The O'Dea High School Athletic Wall of Honor.

== Personal life ==
The Mays family lives in the Magnolia neighborhood of Seattle.

== See also ==
- List of select Jewish football players
