= Tony Dye =

American football player (born 1990)

No. 44
- Position: Free safety

Personal information
- Born: February 11, 1990 (age 36); San Jose, California, U.S.
- Listed height: 6 ft 0 in (1.83 m)
- Listed weight: 205 lb (93 kg)

Career information
- High school: Santiago (Corona, California)
- College: UCLA (2008–2011)
- NFL draft: 2012: undrafted

Career history

Playing
- Cincinnati Bengals (2012–2013); Oakland Raiders (2014)*
- * Offseason or practice squad member only

Coaching
- Norco (CA) (2013–2017) Defensive coordinator; San Bernardino Valley College (2018–2019) Defensive coordinator/Linebackers coach; San Francisco 49ers (2019) On-field special teams assistant; Santa Margarita Catholic (CA) (2020–2022) Defensive coordinator/Assistant athletic director

Career NFL statistics
- Total tackles: 1
- Defensive touchdowns: 1
- Stats at Pro Football Reference

Anthony Scott Dye (born February 11, 1990) is an American former professional football player who was a free safety in the National Football League (NFL). He played college football for the UCLA Bruins. He was signed by the Cincinnati Bengals as an undrafted free agent in 2012, coming off a broken neck at UCLA. After missing the entire 2012 season due to ankle surgery, Dye was activated against the Cleveland Browns the following year, scoring a touchdown for Cincinnati on a 24-yard return of a blocked punt in his NFL debut.

Dye was the defensive coordinator for the Norco High School Varsity football team in Norco, California for four years. He then took the job as Defensive Coordinator at San Bernardino Valley College. He then served in a coaching fellowship with the San Francisco 49ers in 2019. He then served as the defensive coordinator for Santa Margarita Catholic High School in Rancho Santa Margarita, California for two years, while also serving as the assistant athletic director for one year.

As of 2021, Dye serves as the Co-Founder and Chief Marketing Officer of SPARQ.

== Early life ==
Anthony Scott Dye, commonly known as "Tony," attended Santiago High School in Corona, California. He was a PrepStar Dream Team selection in high school. He was selected to the SuperPrep All-American team. He was selected and participated in the Under Armour All-America Game. He was ranked the 9th nationally prospect at cornerback by Scout.com. He was selected to the All-State second team by Cal-Hi Sports.

== College career ==
Dye played college football at the University of California, Los Angeles, where he wore the number 6. He was named co-winner of UCLA's Henry R. "Red" Sanders Award for Most Valuable Player in his junior season. He was named as an Pac-10 honorable mention in his junior season.

A serious injury struck Dye during his senior season, when he fractured his neck in practice. The injury caused Dye to miss all but three games during his senior year, and took away any chance of being selected in the 2011 NFL draft.

== Professional career ==
=== Cincinnati Bengals ===
On May 2, 2012, Dye signed with the Cincinnati Bengals as an undrafted free agent. On August 31, 2012, he was placed on injured reserve due to ankle injury in which causing him to miss the entire 2012 NFL season. On August 31, 2013, he was released by the Bengals.

In September 2013, Dye re-signed with Bengals, joining the team's practice squad. On November 16, 2013, Dye was promoted to the active roster for a Week 11 game against the Cleveland Browns.

Playing on special teams in the Cleveland game, Dye was charged with obstructing the speedy "gunner" at the outside of the line of the punting team near the line of scrimmage. During the second quarter, Dye's Bengals teammate Jayson DiManche got his hand on a Browns punt, sending the ball sideways towards Dye. Dye managed to scoop up the ball and return it 24 yards down the sideline to score a Cincinnati touchdown, en route to a 41-20 Bengals victory. Dye was again deactivated for the Bengals' next game and never saw NFL game action again.

On December 12, 2013, the Bengals waived Dye.

=== 2014 season ===
After his release by the Bengals, Dye visited the New York Giants in an effort to sign on with the club, but team physicians discovered a previously undiagnosed heart condition which prevented the Giants from offering him a contract. Dye returned home to Los Angeles, only to be the called the next day by the Oakland Raiders, who invited him to try out with Oakland.

Dye was signed by the Raiders as a reserve/future free agent on January 14, 2014, but on May 14 he opted to medically retire, ending his NFL career as a player.

== Coaching career ==
After leaving the NFL, Dye made the acquaintance of the head coach of the Norco High School team while picking a younger brother up at practice. Dye was ultimately hired to a coaching position as defensive coordinator of the Norco squad and remained for four years. He then took the job as Defensive Coordinator with San Bernardino Valley College for one year. He then served in a coaching fellowship with the San Francisco 49ers in 2019. He then served as the defensive coordinator for Santa Margarita Catholic High School in Rancho Santa Margarita, California for two years, while also serving as the assistant athletic director for one year.

== Personal life ==
His brother, Travis Dye, played running back at Oregon and USC. His brother, Troy Dye, plays linebacker for the Los Angeles Chargers.
