= Jeromy Miles =

American football player (born 1987)

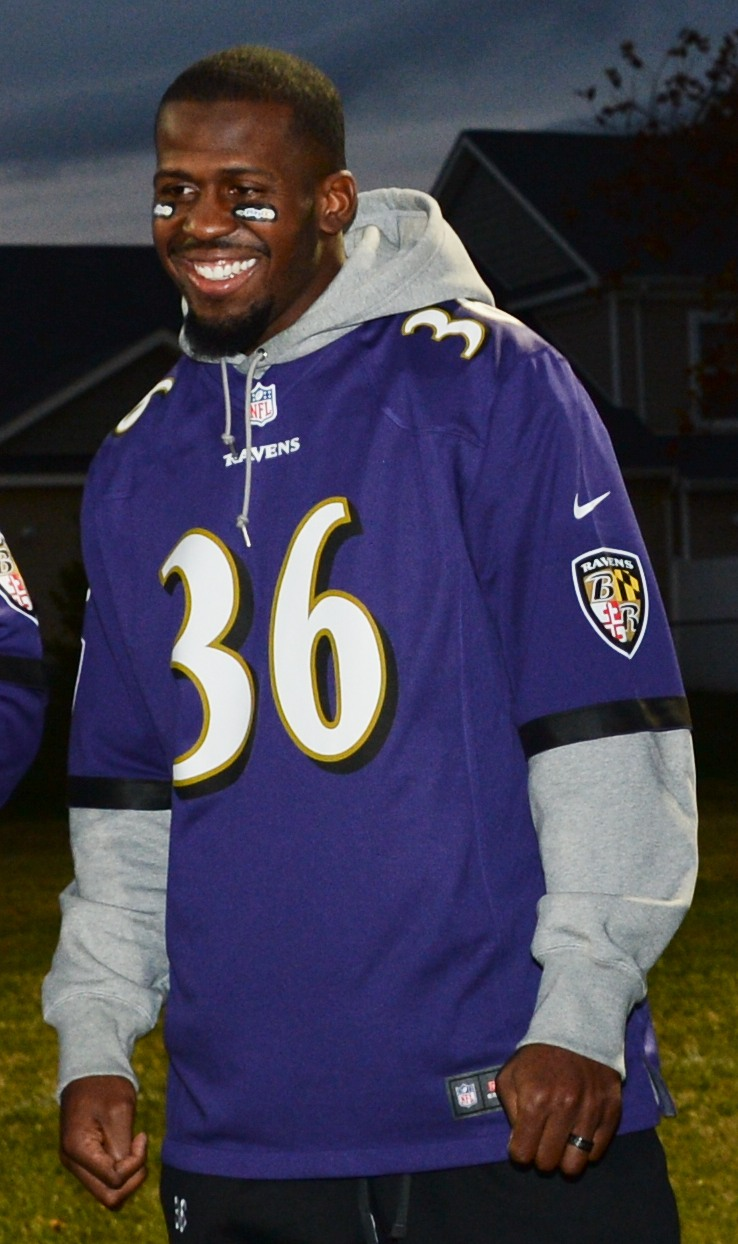
- Miles representing the Ravens at a charity event in 2013.

No. 36, 45
- Position: Strong safety

Personal information
- Born: July 20, 1987 (age 39); Voorhees, New Jersey, U.S.
- Listed height: 6 ft 2 in (1.88 m)
- Listed weight: 215 lb (98 kg)

Career information
- High school: Winslow Township (NJ)
- College: Navy (2006); Massachusetts (2007−2009)
- NFL draft: 2010: undrafted

Career history
- Cincinnati Bengals (2010−2013); Baltimore Ravens (2013−2014); New York Giants (2015)*
- * Offseason or practice squad member only

Career NFL statistics
- Total tackles: 86
- Forced fumbles: 2
- Fumble recoveries: 1
- Interceptions: 1
- Stats at Pro Football Reference

Jeromy Theodore Miles (born July 20, 1987) is an American former professional football player who was a safety in the National Football League (NFL). He played college football for the UMass Minutemen and was signed by the Cincinnati Bengals as an undrafted free agent in 2010.

== Professional career ==
=== Cincinnati Bengals ===
After going undrafted in the 2010 NFL draft, Miles signed with the Cincinnati Bengals as an undrafted free agent on April 30, 2010. He was cut on September 4, 2010. He was re-signed to the practice squad the next day. He was promoted to the active roster on November 24, 2010.

The Bengals offered a one-year tender to Miles on March 13, 2012.

Set to become a free agent in 2013, Miles was offered another one-year tender, which he signed on April 15, 2013. He was released on September 21, 2013.

=== Baltimore Ravens ===
On September 23, 2013, Miles was claimed off waivers by the Baltimore Ravens. He mostly contributed on special teams for the Ravens finishing his season with 10 total tackles.

Miles re-signed with the Ravens to a one-year contract on March 13, 2014.

Miles recorded his first career interception on December 14, 2014.

=== New York Giants ===
On July 15, 2015, it was reported that Miles signed a one-year deal with the New York Giants. On September 5, 2015, he was cut by the Giants.
