= 2015 Cincinnati Bengals season =

NFL team season

- Owner: Mike Brown
- Head coach: Marvin Lewis
- Offensive coordinator: Hue Jackson
- Defensive coordinator: Paul Guenther
- Home stadium: Paul Brown Stadium

Results
- Record: 12–4
- Division place: 1st AFC North
- Playoffs: Lost Wild Card Playoffs (vs. Steelers) 16–18
- Pro Bowlers: TE Tyler Eifert; WR A. J. Green; FS Reggie Nelson; OT Andrew Whitworth; DE Carlos Dunlap; DT Geno Atkins; CB Adam Jones; ST Cedric Peerman

Uniform
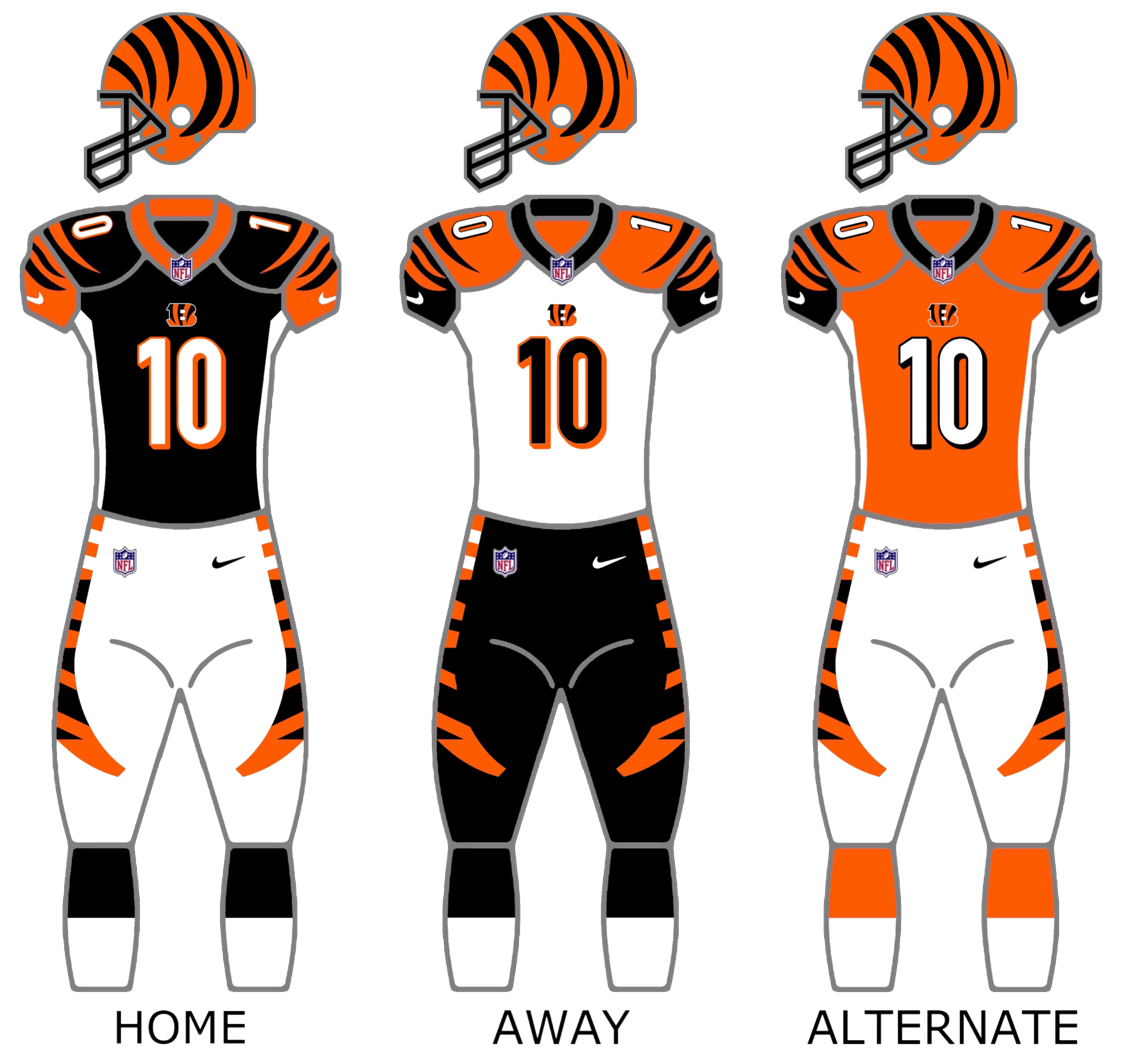

The 2015 season was the Cincinnati Bengals' 46th in the National Football League (NFL), their 48th overall and their 13th under head coach Marvin Lewis.

The Cincinnati Bengals got off to a franchise best start after beating the Pittsburgh Steelers at Heinz Field by a score of 16–10, improving them to 7–0. Their winning streak ended in Week 10 with a loss to the Houston Texans in Cincinnati. Later in the season, they clinched a playoff spot for a franchise record fifth straight year. They clinched their second AFC North title in the last three seasons with their Week 16 loss at the Denver Broncos because of the Steelers loss to the Ravens the day before. They lost to the Steelers in the Wild Card 18–16 in what is considered one of the biggest meltdowns in Bengals history. This marked the 25th consecutive season without a playoff win for the Bengals. They also became the first team in NFL history to lose five consecutive playoff games in the first round.

2015 was the Bengals final playoff appearance in the Marvin Lewis era, as they entered a period of decline afterwards. They did not return to the postseason nor had a winning record until 2021, where they reached Super Bowl LVI, although they lost to the Los Angeles Rams. 2015 was also the final year of the Marvin Lewis era in which the Bengals would not be swept by any AFC North rivals. The Bengals would fail to avoid being swept by AFC North rivals until 2022.

== 2015 draft class ==
2015 Cincinnati Bengals Draft
| Round | Selection | Player | Position | College |
|---|---|---|---|---|
| 1 | 21 | Cedric Ogbuehi | OT | Texas A&M |
| 2 | 53 | Jake Fisher | OT | Oregon |
| 3 | 85 | Tyler Kroft | TE | Rutgers |
| 3 | 99 | Paul Dawson | LB | TCU |
| 4 | 120 | Josh Shaw | S | USC |
| 4 | 135 | Marcus Hardison | DT | Arizona State |
| 5 | 157 | C. J. Uzomah | TE | Auburn |
| 6 | 197 | Derron Smith | S | Fresno State |
| 7 | 238 | Mario Alford | WR | West Virginia |

| Compensatory selection 3rd round pick awarded for losing Michael Johnson in free agency. |

== Staff ==
2015 Cincinnati Bengals staff
| Front office: President – Mike Brown; Senior vice president of player personnel – Pete Brown; Executive vice president – Katie Blackburn; Vice president of player personnel – Paul H. Brown; Director of player personnel – Duke Tobin; Head coaches: Head coach – Marvin Lewis; Assistant head coach/offensive line coach – Paul Alexander; Offensive coaches: Offensive coordinator – Hue Jackson; Quarterbacks – Ken Zampese; Running backs – Kyle Caskey; Wide receivers – James Urban; Tight ends – Jonathan Hayes; Offensive assistant/quality control – Brian Braswell | Defensive coaches: Defensive coordinator – Paul Guenther; Defensive line – Jay Hayes; Linebackers – Matt Burke; Assistant linebackers/quality control – David Lippincott; Defensive backs – Vance Joseph; Defensive backs – Mark Carrier; Defensive assistant/quality control – Marcus Lewis; Special teams coaches: Special teams coordinator – Darrin Simmons; Assistant special teams/defensive quality control – Robert Livingston; Assistant special teams/quality control – Brayden Coombs; Strength and conditioning: Strength and conditioning – Chip Morton; Strength and conditioning assistant – Jeff Friday |

== Final roster ==
2015 Cincinnati Bengals roster
| Quarterbacks (QB): 14 Andy Dalton; 5 A. J. McCarron; 3 Keith Wenning; Running backs (RB): 25 Giovani Bernard; 33 Rex Burkhead; 32 Jeremy Hill; 30 Cedric Peerman; Wide receivers (WR): 15 Mario Alford; 18 A. J. Green; 82 Marvin Jones; 12 Mohamed Sanu; 19 Brandon Tate; Tight ends (TE): 85 Tyler Eifert; 44 Jake Fisher; 89 Ryan Hewitt; 81 Tyler Kroft; 87 C. J. Uzomah | Offensive linemen (OL): 61 Russell Bodine C; 65 Clint Boling G; 60 T. J. Johnson C; 70 Cedric Ogbuehi T; 71 Andre Smith T; 77 Andrew Whitworth T; 73 Eric Winston T; 68 Kevin Zeitler G; Defensive linemen (DL): 97 Geno Atkins DT; 93 Will Clarke DE; 96 Carlos Dunlap DE; 95 Wallace Gilberry DE; 91 Marcus Hardison DT; 99 Margus Hunt DE; 90 Michael Johnson DE; 94 Domata Peko DT; 92 Pat Sims DT; 98 Brandon Thompson DT | Linebackers (LB): 55 Vontaze Burfict OLB; 47 Paul Dawson OLB; 50 A. J. Hawk OLB; 59 Emmanuel Lamur OLB; 58 Rey Maualuga MLB; 57 Vincent Rey; Defensive backs (DB): 29 Leon Hall CB; 43 George Iloka SS; 24 Adam Jones CB; 27 Dre Kirkpatrick CB; 37 Chris Lewis-Harris CB; 20 Reggie Nelson FS; 26 Josh Shaw CB; 40 Derron Smith FS; 36 Shawn Williams SS; Special teams (ST): 46 Clark Harris LS; 10 Kevin Huber P; 2 Mike Nugent K | Practice squad: 80 Michael Bennett WR; 66 Trey Hopkins G; 41 Asa Jackson CB; 13 Mike Kafka QB; 84 Jake Kumerow WR; 88 Matt Lengel TE; 45 Trevor Roach OLB; 33 Terrell Watson RB; 34 James Wilder Jr. RB; 69 DeShawn Williams DT; Reserve: 21 Darqueze Dennard CB (IR); 53 Marquis Flowers OLB (IR); 86 James Wright WR (IR); Rookies in italics 53 active, 3 reserve, 10 practice squad |

== Schedule ==
=== Preseason ===
| Week | Date | Opponent | Result | Record | Venue | Recap |
|---|---|---|---|---|---|---|
| 1 | August 14 | New York Giants | **W** 23–10 | 1–0 | Paul Brown Stadium | Recap |
| 2 | August 24 | at Tampa Bay Buccaneers | **L** 11–25 | 1–1 | Raymond James Stadium | Recap |
| 3 | August 29 | Chicago Bears | **W** 21–10 | 2–1 | Paul Brown Stadium | Recap |
| 4 | September 3 | at Indianapolis Colts | **W** 9–6 | 3–1 | Lucas Oil Stadium | Recap |

=== Regular season ===
| Week | Date | Opponent | Result | Record | Venue | Recap |
|---|---|---|---|---|---|---|
| 1 | September 13 | at Oakland Raiders | **W** 33–13 | 1–0 | O.co Coliseum | Recap |
| 2 | September 20 | San Diego Chargers | **W** 24–19 | 2–0 | Paul Brown Stadium | Recap |
| 3 | September 27 | at **Baltimore Ravens** | **W** 28–24 | 3–0 | M&T Bank Stadium | Recap |
| 4 | October 4 | Kansas City Chiefs | **W** 36–21 | 4–0 | Paul Brown Stadium | Recap |
| 5 | October 11 | Seattle Seahawks | **W** 27–24 (OT) | 5–0 | Paul Brown Stadium | Recap |
| 6 | October 18 | at Buffalo Bills | **W** 34–21 | 6–0 | Ralph Wilson Stadium | Recap |
| 7 | Bye | | | | | |
| 8 | November 1 | at **Pittsburgh Steelers** | **W** 16–10 | 7–0 | Heinz Field | Recap |
| 9 | November 5 | **Cleveland Browns** | **W** 31–10 | 8–0 | Paul Brown Stadium | Recap |
| 10 | November 16 | Houston Texans | **L** 6–10 | 8–1 | Paul Brown Stadium | Recap |
| 11 | November 22 | at Arizona Cardinals | **L** 31–34 | 8–2 | University of Phoenix Stadium | Recap |
| 12 | November 29 | St. Louis Rams | **W** 31–7 | 9–2 | Paul Brown Stadium | Recap |
| 13 | December 6 | at **Cleveland Browns** | **W** 37–3 | 10–2 | FirstEnergy Stadium | Recap |
| 14 | December 13 | **Pittsburgh Steelers** | **L** 20–33 | 10–3 | Paul Brown Stadium | Recap |
| 15 | December 20 | at San Francisco 49ers | **W** 24–14 | 11–3 | Levi's Stadium | Recap |
| 16 | December 28 | at Denver Broncos | **L** 17–20 (OT) | 11–4 | Sports Authority Field at Mile High | Recap |
| 17 | January 3 | **Baltimore Ravens** | **W** 24–16 | 12–4 | Paul Brown Stadium | Recap |

Note: Intra-division opponents are in bold text.

=== Postseason ===
| Round | Date | Opponent (seed) | Result | Record | Venue | Recap |
|---|---|---|---|---|---|---|
| Wild Card | January 9, 2016 | Pittsburgh Steelers (6) | **L** 16–18 | 0–1 | Paul Brown Stadium | Recap |

== Game summaries ==
=== Regular season ===
==== Week 1: at Oakland Raiders ====
Week One: Cincinnati Bengals at Oakland Raiders – Game summary

| Quarter | 1 | 2 | 3 | 4 | Total |
|---|---|---|---|---|---|
| Bengals | 7 | 17 | 9 | 0 | 33 |
| Raiders | 0 | 0 | 0 | 13 | 13 |

at O.co Coliseum, Oakland, California

- Date: September 13
- Game time: 4:25 p.m. EDT/1:25 p.m. PDT
- Game weather: 73 °F (23 °C), cloudy
- Game attendance: 54,500
- Referee: Brad Allen
- TV announcers (CBS): Tom McCarthy and Chris Simms
- Recap, Gamebook

Game information

First quarter

- CIN – Jeremy Hill 3-yard run (Mike Nugent kick), 7:15. Bengals 7–0. Drive: 11 plays, 59 yards, 6:18.

Second quarter

- CIN – Mike Nugent 32 yard field goal, 9:29. Bengals 10–0. Drive: 9 plays, 78 yards, 4:05.
- CIN – Jeremy Hill 2 yard run (Mike Nugent kick), 2:21. Bengals 17–0. Drive: 6 plays, 44 yards, 3:00.
- CIN – Tyler Eifert 13-yard pass from Andy Dalton (Mike Nugent kick), 0:07. Bengals 24–0. Drive: 6 plays, 61 yards, 0:56.

Third quarter

- CIN – Tyler Eifert 8 yard reception from Andy Dalton (kick failed), 3:42. Bengals 30–0. Drive: 8 plays, 85 yards, 4:08.
- CIN – Mike Nugent 35 yard field goal, 1:25. Bengals 33–0. Drive: 4 plays, 0 yards, 1:25.

Fourth quarter

- OAK – Marcel Reece 11-yard pass from Matt McGloin (Sebastian Janikowski kick), 7:55. Bengals 33–7. Drive: 11 plays, 59 yards, 4:41.
- OAK – Marcel Reece 9 yard pass from Matt McGloin (2 point conversion failed), 2:13. Bengals 33–13. Drive: 8 plays, 55 yards, 3:04.

Top passers

- CIN – Andy Dalton – 25/34, 269 yards, 2 TD
- OAK – Matt McGloin – 23/31, 142 yards, 2 TD, 1 INT

Top rushers

- CIN – Jeremy Hill – 19 carries, 63 yards, 2 TD
- OAK – Latavius Murray – 11 carries, 44 yards

Top receivers

- CIN – Tyler Eifert – 9 receptions, 104 yards, 2 TD
- OAK – Amari Cooper – 5 receptions, 47 yards

Top tacklers

- CIN – Adam Jones – 10 tackles
- OAK – Larry Asante – 8 tackles, 1 TFL

The Bengals started their season on the road against the Raiders. They would score first when Jeremy Hill ran for a TD from 3 yards out 7–0 lead in the first quarter for that quarter's only score. They increase their lead in the second quarter when Mike Nugent nailed a 32-yard field goal for a 10–0 lead followed up by Hill running for a 2-yard TD for a 17–0 lead followed up by Andy Dalton finding Tyler Eifert on a 13-yard TD pass for a 24–0 lead at halftime. After the break, the Bengals went back to work as Dalton and Eifert hooked up again this time on an 8-yard TD pass (with a failed PAT) for a 30–0 lead. Nugent put a 35-yard field goal through for a 33–0 lead. In the fourth quarter, it was all Raiders when Backup QB Matt McGloin found Marcel Reese on 2 straight TD passes: from 11 and 9 yards out (with a failed 2-point conversion) for a final score of 33–13.

With the win, the Bengals started their season 1–0. This was the Bengals' first win against the Raiders in Oakland, improving their record at Oakland to 1–10.

==== Week 2: vs. San Diego Chargers ====
Week Two: San Diego Chargers at Cincinnati Bengals – Game summary

| Quarter | 1 | 2 | 3 | 4 | Total |
|---|---|---|---|---|---|
| Chargers | 3 | 3 | 7 | 6 | 19 |
| Bengals | 7 | 7 | 3 | 7 | 24 |

at Paul Brown Stadium, Cincinnati, Ohio

- Date: September 20
- Game time: 1:00 pm. EDT
- Game weather: 69 °F (21 °C), partly cloudy
- Game attendance: 57,579
- Referee: Jeff Triplette
- TV announcers (CBS): Ian Eagle, Dan Fouts and Evan Washburn
- Preview, Gamebook

Game information

First quarter

- CIN – A. J. Green 16-yard pass from Andy Dalton (Mike Nugent kick), 12:51. Bengals 7–0. Drive: 2 plays, 19 yards, 0:45.
- SD – Josh Lambo 40-yard field goal, 8:38. Bengals 7–3. Drive: 9 plays, 57 yards, 4:13.

Second quarter

- SD – Josh Lambo 32 yard field goal, 9:24. Bengals 7–6. Drive: 9 plays, 60 yards, 5:19.
- CIN – Marvin Jones 45-yard pass from Andy Dalton (Mike Nugent kick), 6:01. Bengals 14–6. Drive: 6 plays, 84 yards, 3:23.

Third quarter

- SD – Stevie Johnson 10-yard pass from Philip Rivers (Josh Lambo kick), 10:34. Bengals 14–13. Drive: 8 plays, 78 yards, 4:26.
- CIN – Mike Nugent 21 yard field goal, 2:44. Bengals 17–13. Drive: 10 plays, 60 yards, 3:14.

Fourth quarter

- CIN – Tyler Eifert 9-yard pass from Andy Dalton (Mike Nugent kick), 8:49. Bengals 24–13. Drive: 6 plays, 38 yards, 2:05.
- SD – Malcom Floyd 40-yard pass from Philip Rivers (Two-Point Pass Conversion Failed), 4:20. Bengals 24–19. Drive: 10 plays, 80 yards, 4:29.

Top passers

- SD – Philip Rivers – 21/27, 241 yards, 2 TD, 1 INT
- CIN – Andy Dalton – 16/26, 214 yards, 3 TD

Top rushers

- SD – Melvin Gordon – 16 carries, 88 yards
- CIN – Giovani Bernard – 20 carries, 123 yards

Top receivers

- SD – Danny Woodhead – 6 receptions, 68 yards
- CIN – Tyler Eifert – 4 receptions, 49 yards, 1 TD

Top tacklers

- SD – Eric Weddle – 10 tackles
- CIN – Adam Jones – 9 tackles

The Bengals' home opener was against the Chargers. In the first quarter, Andy Dalton found A. J. Green on a 16-yard pass for a 7–0 lead. The Chargers would later on score when Josh Lambo kicked a 40-yard field goal for a 7–3 game. They drew closer in the second quarter, when Lambo kicked another field goal from 32 yards out for a 7–6 game. The Bengals moved ahead by 8 when Andy Dalton found Marvin Jones on a 45-yard pass for a 14–6 game at halftime. In the third quarter, the Chargers once again came within a point when Philip Rivers found Stevie Johnson on a 10-yard pass for a 14–13 game. The Bengals pulled ahead by 4 when Mike Nugent kicked a 21-yard field goal for a 17–13 game. In the fourth quarter, Dalton found Tyler Eifert on a 9-yard pass for a 24–13 lead. The Chargers would come within 5 as Rivers found Malcolm Floyd on a 40-yard pass for a 24–19 game. After pressuring the Bengals' offense, the Chargers got the ball back. Though one of Rivers's comeback passes was picked off sealing the win for the Bengals.

With the win, the Bengals improved to 2–0.

==== Week 3: at Baltimore Ravens ====
Week Three: Cincinnati Bengals at Baltimore Ravens – Game summary

| Quarter | 1 | 2 | 3 | 4 | Total |
|---|---|---|---|---|---|
| Bengals | 7 | 7 | 0 | 14 | 28 |
| Ravens | 0 | 0 | 7 | 17 | 24 |

at M&T Bank Stadium, Baltimore, Maryland

- Date: September 27
- Game time: 1:00 pm. EDT
- Game weather: 70 °F (21 °C), cloudy
- Game attendance: 70,970
- Referee: Walt Anderson
- TV announcers (CBS): Andrew Catalon, Steve Beuerlein, Steve Tasker and Dana Jacobson
- Recap, Gamebook

Game information

First quarter

- CIN – Andy Dalton 7-yard run (Mike Nugent kick), 7:20. Bengals 7–0. Drive: 10 plays, 67 yards, 5:25.

Second quarter

- CIN – Marvin Jones 16-yard pass from Andy Dalton (Mike Nugent kick), 12:18. Bengals 14–0. Drive: 3 plays, 30 yards, 0:19.

Third quarter

- BAL – Steve Smith, Sr. 50-yard pass from Joe Flacco (Justin Tucker kick), 6:23. Bengals 14–7. Drive: 7 plays, 80 yards, 4:20.

Fourth quarter

- BAL – Justin Tucker 21 yard field goal, 13:27. Bengals 14–10. Drive: 12 plays, 62 yards, 5:58.
- BAL – C. J. Mosley 41-yard fumble return (Justin Tucker kick), 6:49. Ravens 17–14. Drive: 5 plays, 19 yards, 2:15.
- CIN – A. J. Green 80-yard pass from Andy Dalton (Mike Nugent kick), 6:37. Bengals 21–17. Drive: 1 play, 80 yards, 0:12.
- BAL – Steve Smith, Sr. 16-yard pass from Joe Flacco (Justin Tucker kick), 3:56. Ravens 24–21. Drive: 9 plays, 79 yards, 2:41.
- CIN – A. J. Green 7-yard pass from Andy Dalton (Mike Nugent kick), 2:10. Bengals 28–24. Drive: 6 plays, 80 yards, 1:46.

Top passers

- CIN – Andy Dalton – 20/32, 383 yards, 3 TD, 1 INT
- BAL – Joe Flacco – 32/49, 362 yards, 2 TD, 1 INT

Top rushers

- CIN – Giovani Bernard – 13 carries, 49 yards, 0 TD
- BAL – Justin Forsett – 10 carries, 13 yards, 0 TD

Top receivers

- CIN – A. J. Green – 10 receptions, 227 yards, 2 TD
- BAL – Steve Smith Sr. – 13 receptions, 186 yards, 2 TD

Top tacklers

- CIN – Vincent Rey – 8 tackles, 4 solo
- BAL – Brandon Williams – 8 tackles, 4 solo, 2 TFL

After a tough win at home over the Chargers, the Bengals traveled to Baltimore to take on the winless Ravens. The first half was all Bengals: they scored in the first quarter as Andy Dalton ran for a 7-yard TD for a 7–0 lead and followed up in the second quarter when Dalton found Marvin Jones on a 16-yard TD pass for a 14–0 lead at halftime. The Ravens were able to get on the board in the third quarter when Joe Flacco found Steve Smith Sr. on a 50-yard TD pass for a 14–7 game and the only score of the period. In the fourth quarter, the Ravens took the lead at first coming within 4 when Justin Tucker put a 21-yard field goal through for a 14–10 game and then when C. J. Mosley returned a fumble 41 yards for a TD for a 17–14 lead. The Bengals retook the lead when Dalton found A. J. Green on an 80-yard TD pass for a 21–17 game before the Ravens went back into the lead when Flacco found Smith Sr. again this time on a 16-yard TD pass for a 24–21 game. Dalton and Green hooked up on the last score of the game: a 7-yard TD pass for the final score of 28–24.

With their 4th straight win over the Ravens, the Bengals improved to 3–0 for the 2nd straight season, and captured their 4th 3–0 start under Marvin Lewis. This was also their first ever 2 game winning streak in Baltimore.

==== Week 4: vs. Kansas City Chiefs ====
Week Four: Kansas City Chiefs at Cincinnati Bengals – Game summary

| Quarter | 1 | 2 | 3 | 4 | Total |
|---|---|---|---|---|---|
| Chiefs | 3 | 9 | 3 | 6 | 21 |
| Bengals | 14 | 0 | 15 | 7 | 36 |

at Paul Brown Stadium, Cincinnati, Ohio

- Date: October 4
- Game time: 1:00 pm. EDT
- Game weather: 68 °F (20 °C), sunny
- Game attendance: 57,498
- Referee: Ron Torbert
- TV announcers (CBS): Spero Dedes and Solomon Wilcots
- Recap, Gamebook

Game information

First quarter

- CIN – Jeremy Hill 8-yard run (Mike Nugent kick), 11:33. Bengals 7–0. Drive: 7 plays, 80 yards, 3:27.
- KC – Cairo Santos 22-yard field goal, 4:38. Bengals 7–3. Drive: 13 plays, 78 yards, 6:58.
- CIN – Giovani Bernard 13-yard run (Mike Nugent kick), 0:53. Bengals 14–3. Drive: 7 plays, 80 yards, 3:42.

Second quarter

- KC – Cairo Santos 40 yard field goal, 12:44. Bengals 14–6. Drive: 6 plays, 58 yards, 3:09.
- KC – Cairo Santos 51 yard field goal, 6:09. Bengals 14–9. Drive: 10 plays, 60 yards, 4:34.
- KC – Cairo Santos 34 yard field goal, 0:04. Bengals 14–12. Drive: 8 plays, 49 yards, 4:24.

Third quarter

- CIN – Brandon Tate 55-yard pass from Andy Dalton (Mike Nugent kick), 8:43. Bengals 21–12. Drive: 7 plays, 77 yards, 3:08.
- KC – Cairo Santos 40 yard field goal, 4:37. Bengals 21–15. Drive: 8 plays, 58 yards, 4:06.
- CIN – Jeremy Hill 5 yard run (Jeremy Hill run for two-point conversion), 0:11. Bengals 29–15. Drive: 2 plays, 5 yards, 0:12.

Fourth quarter

- KC – Cairo Santos 29 yard field goal, 9:28. Bengals 29–18. Drive: 16 plays, 71 yards, 5:43.
- CIN – Jeremy Hill 1 yard run (Mike Nugent kick), 4:50. Bengals 36–18. Drive: 8 plays, 60 yards, 4:38.
- KC – Cairo Santos 51 yard field goal, 2:34. Bengals 36–21. Drive: 5 plays, 47 yards, 2:16.

Top passers

- KC – Alex Smith – 31/45, 386 yards
- CIN – Andy Dalton – 17/24, 321 yards, 1 TD

Top rushers

- KC – Jamaal Charles – 11 carries, 75 yards
- CIN – Giovani Bernard – 13 carries, 62 yards, 1 TD

Top receivers

- KC – Jeremy Maclin – 11 receptions, 148 yards
- CIN – Mohamed Sanu – 4 receptions, 84 yards

Top tacklers

- KC – Ron Parker – 8 tackles
- CIN – Vincent Rey – 15 tackles, 1 TFL

After a tough win over the Ravens, the Bengals returned home for a game against the Chiefs. They would score first in the first quarter when Jeremy Hill ran for an 8-yard TD for a 7–0 lead. Cairo Santos then put a 22-yard field goal through to give the Chiefs their first score of the game 7–3. The Bengals moved ahead by 11 when Giovani Bernard ran for a 13-yard TD for a 14–3 game. In the second quarter, it was all Chiefs as Santos nailed 3 straight field goals eventually to get within 2 points before halftime: from 40, 51, and 34 yards out for 14–6, 14–9, and the 14–12 score at halftime. The Bengals however got back to work in the third quarter when Andy Dalton found Brandon Tate on a 55-yard TD pass increasing their lead to 21–12. The Chiefs came within 6 as Santos put a 40-yard field goal through for a 21–15 game. The Bengals moved ahead by 14 when Hill ran for a 5-yard TD (with a successful 2-point conversion) for a 29–15 game. In the fourth quarter, the Chiefs moved within 11 as Santos put a 29-yard field goal through for a 29–18 game. The Bengals would pretty much seal the game when Hill ran for a 1-yard TD for a 36–18 game. The Chiefs wrapped up the scoring of the game when Santos kicked yet another 51-yard field goal for the eventual final score of 36–21.

With the win, the Bengals improved to 4–0, their first such start since 2005. The defense also didn't allow a single touchdown (just 7 field goals). They also won their 5th straight home game against the Chiefs.

==== Week 5: vs. Seattle Seahawks ====
Week Five: Seattle Seahawks at Cincinnati Bengals – Game summary

| Quarter | 1 | 2 | 3 | 4 | OT | Total |
|---|---|---|---|---|---|---|
| Seahawks | 7 | 3 | 14 | 0 | 0 | 24 |
| Bengals | 7 | 0 | 0 | 17 | 3 | 27 |

at Paul Brown Stadium, Cincinnati, Ohio

- Date: October 11
- Game time: 1:00 pm. EDT
- Game weather: 66 °F (19 °C), sunny
- Game attendance: 65,004
- Referee: John Parry
- TV announcers (Fox): Joe Buck, Troy Aikman and Erin Andrews
- Recap, Gamebook

Game information

First quarter

- CIN – Tyler Eifert 14-yard pass from Andy Dalton (Mike Nugent kick), 11:02. Bengals 7–0. Drive: 7 plays, 86 yards, 3:58.
- SEA – Jermaine Kearse 30-yard pass from Russell Wilson (Steven Hauschka kick), 6:32. Tied 7–7. Drive: 8 plays, 80 yards, 4:30.

Second quarter

- SEA – Steven Hauschka 24 yard field goal, 0:00. Seahawks 10–7. Drive: 7 plays, 76 yards, 0:54.

Third quarter

- SEA – Thomas Rawls 69-yard run (Steven Hauschka kick), 8:38. Seahawks 17–7. Drive: 1 play, 69 yards, 0:13.
- SEA – Bobby Wagner 23-yard fumble return (Steven Hauschka kick), 6:41. Seahawks 24–7. Drive: 4 plays, 9 yards, 1:57.

Fourth quarter

- CIN – Tyler Eifert 10 yard pass from Andy Dalton (Mike Nugent kick), 12:18. Seahawks 24–14. Drive: 4 plays, 33 yards, 1:38.
- CIN – Andy Dalton 5 yard run (Mike Nugent kick), 3:38. Seahawks 24–21. Drive: 11 plays, 71 yards, 5:49.
- CIN – Mike Nugent 31 yard field goal, 0:00. Tied 24–24. Drive: 7 plays, 69 yards, 2:17.

Overtime

- CIN – Mike Nugent 42 yard field goal, 3:36. Bengals 27–24. Drive: 6 plays, 33 yards, 3:26.

Top passers

- SEA – Russell Wilson – 15/23, 213 yards, 1 TD, 1 INT
- CIN – Andy Dalton – 30/44, 331 yards, 2 TD, 1 INT

Top rushers

- SEA – Thomas Rawls – 23 carries, 169 yards, 1 TD
- CIN – Giovani Bernard – 15 carries, 80 yards

Top receivers

- SEA – Doug Baldwin – 3 receptions, 70 yards
- CIN – Tyler Eifert – 8 receptions, 90 yards, 2 TD

Top tacklers

- SEA – Kam Chancellor – 11 tackles
- CIN – Vincent Rey – 13 tackles

The Bengals returned home to take on the Seahawks. They would score first in the first quarter when Andy Dalton found Tyler Eifert on a 14-yard TD pass for a 7–0. The Seahawks scored 24 straight points: later on in the quarter they managed to tie it up when Russel Wilson found Jermaine Kearse on a 30-yard TD pass for a 7–7 game. In the second quarter, the Seahawks took the lead as Steven Hauschka nailed a 24-yard field goal for a 10–7 game at halftime. In the third quarter, the Seahawks went back to work as Thomas Rawls ran for a 69-yard TD for a 17–7 game followed up by Bobby Wagner returning a fumble 23 yards for a TD for a 24–7 game. In the fourth quarter, the Bengals would start a reign of 20 straight points: First starting out when Dalton and Eifert hooked up again on a 10-yard TD pass for a 24–14 game followed by Dalton running for a 5-yard TD for a 24–21 game. Mike Nugent then kicked a 31-yard field goal through for a tied game at 24–24. In overtime, Nugent would kick the game winning 42-yard field goal for the 27–24 win.

With the win, the Bengals improved to 5–0 for the first time since 1988.

This win also tied the 3rd largest comeback win in franchise history. It was also the first time the Seahawks had blown a 17-point 4th quarter lead since 2004 against St. Louis.

==== Week 6: at Buffalo Bills ====
Week Six: Cincinnati Bengals at Buffalo Bills – Game summary

| Quarter | 1 | 2 | 3 | 4 | Total |
|---|---|---|---|---|---|
| Bengals | 7 | 10 | 14 | 3 | 34 |
| Bills | 7 | 7 | 0 | 7 | 21 |

at Ralph Wilson Stadium, Orchard Park, New York

- Date: October 18
- Game time: 1:00 pm. EDT
- Game weather: 40 °F (4 °C), cloudy
- Game attendance: 69,593
- Referee: Clete Blakeman
- TV announcers (CBS): Spero Dedes and Solomon Wilcots
- Recap, Gamebook

Game information

First quarter

- BUF – EJ Manuel 2-yard run (Dan Carpenter kick), 9:21. Bills 7–0. Drive: 11 plays, 80 yards, 5:39.
- CIN – Jeremy Hill 13-yard pass from Andy Dalton (Mike Nugent kick), 3:26. Tied 7–7. Drive: 7 plays, 49 yards, 2:43.

Second quarter

- CIN – Giovani Bernard 17-yard run (Mike Nugent kick), 10:19. Bengals 14–7. Drive: 5 plays, 55 yards, 2:11.
- CIN – Mike Nugent 47 yard field goal, 7:12. Bengals 17–7. Drive: 4 plays, 7 yards, 1:34.
- BUF – Sammy Watkins 22-yard pass from EJ Manuel (Dan Carpenter kick), 0:17. Bengals 17–14. Drive: 14 plays, 86 yards, 6:55.

Third quarter

- CIN – Marvin Jones 10-yard pass from Andy Dalton (Mike Nugent kick), 10:55. Bengals 24–14. Drive: 8 plays, 90 yards, 4:05.
- CIN – Tyler Eifert 4-yard pass from Andy Dalton (Mike Nugent kick), 1:42. Bengals 31–14. Drive: 12 plays, 78 yards, 4:41.

Fourth quarter

- CIN – Mike Nugent 39 yard field goal, 10:40. Bengals 34–14. Drive: 10 plays, 45 yards, 5:07.
- BUF – LeSean McCoy 4-yard run (Dan Carpenter kick), 6:50. Bengals 34–21. Drive: 9 plays, 80 yards, 3:50.

Top passers

- CIN – Andy Dalton – 22/33, 243 yards, 3 TD
- BUF – EJ Manuel – 28/42, 263 yards, 1 TD, 1 INT

Top rushers

- CIN – Jeremy Hill – 16 carries, 56 yards
- BUF – LeSean McCoy – 17 carries, 90 yards, 1 TD

Top receivers

- CIN – Marvin Jones – 9 receptions, 95 yards, 1 TD
- BUF – Charles Clay – 9 receptions, 62 yards

Top tacklers

- CIN – Reggie Nelson – 12 tackles, 1 TFL
- BUF – Preston Brown – 9 tackles

With the win, the Bengals improved to 6–0, their first such start since 1988 which would also see them on a 6-game winning streak. This would be their third 6–0 start in franchise history.

==== Week 8: at Pittsburgh Steelers ====
Week Eight: Cincinnati Bengals at Pittsburgh Steelers – Game summary

| Quarter | 1 | 2 | 3 | 4 | Total |
|---|---|---|---|---|---|
| Bengals | 3 | 3 | 0 | 10 | 16 |
| Steelers | 7 | 0 | 3 | 0 | 10 |

at Heinz Field, Pittsburgh, Pennsylvania

- Date: November 1
- Game time: 1:00 pm. EST
- Game weather: 62 °F (17 °C), cloudy
- Game attendance: 64,750
- Referee: Tony Corrente
- TV announcers (CBS): Ian Eagle, Dan Fouts and Evan Washburn
- Recap, Gamebook

Game information

First quarter

- PIT – Antonio Brown 1 yd pass from Ben Roethlisberger, 7:46. Steelers 7–0. Drive: 12 plays, 80 yards, 7:14.
- CIN – Mike Nugent 44 yd Field Goal, 2:50. Steelers 7–3. Drive: 10 plays, 54 yards, 4:56.

Second quarter

- CIN – Mike Nugent 45 yd Field Goal, 14:55. Steelers 7–6. Drive: 5 plays, 12 yards, 1:46.

Third quarter

- PIT – Chris Boswell 32 yd Field Goal, 6:27. Steelers 10–6. Drive: 9 plays, 78 yards, 4:16.

Fourth quarter

- CIN – A. J. Green 9 yd pass from Andy Dalton, 2:57. Bengals 13–10. Drive: 6 plays, 45 yards, 2:37.
- CIN – Mike Nugent 44 yd Field Goal, 1:47. Bengals 16–10. Drive: 4 plays, 0 yards, 0:57.

Top passers

- CIN – Andy Dalton – 23–38, 231 yards, 1 TD, 2 INT
- PIT – Ben Roethlisberger – 28–45, 262 yards, 1 TD, 3 INT

Top rushers

- CIN – Jeremy Hill – 15 carries, 60 yards
- PIT – DeAngelo Williams – 9 carries, 71 yards

Top receivers

- CIN – A. J. Green – 11 receptions, 118 yards, 1 TD
- PIT – Heath Miller – 10 receptions, 105 yards

Top tacklers

- CIN – Vincent Rey – 8 tackles, 5 solo
- PIT – Antwon Blake – 8 tackles, 8 solo

Despite the return of Ben Roethlisberger, the Bengals managed to come from behind and win the game 16–10 and achieve a mark of 7–0 for the first time in franchise history.

As it later turned out, this would be the final time the Bengals defeated the Steelers with Marvin Lewis as head coach. Pittsburgh won the remaining 8 games against the Lewis-led Bengals from their second meeting during 2015 through 2018.

==== Week 9: vs. Cleveland Browns ====
Week Nine: Cleveland Browns at Cincinnati Bengals – Game summary

| Quarter | 1 | 2 | 3 | 4 | Total |
|---|---|---|---|---|---|
| Browns | 3 | 7 | 0 | 0 | 10 |
| Bengals | 7 | 7 | 3 | 14 | 31 |

at Paul Brown Stadium, Cincinnati, Ohio

- Date: November 5
- Game time: 8:25 pm. EST
- Game weather: 71 °F (22 °C), cloudy
- Game attendance: 65,816
- Referee: John Hussey
- TV announcers (NFLN): Jim Nantz, Phil Simms and Tracy Wolfson
- Recap, Gamebook

Game information

First quarter

- CIN – Tyler Eifert 9-yard pass from Andy Dalton (Mike Nugent kick), 7:12. Bengals 7–0. Drive: 10 plays, 63 yards, 5:13.
- CLE – Travis Coons 27-yard field goal, 0:10. Bengals 7–3. Drive: 14 plays, 71 yards, 7:02.

Second quarter

- CIN – Tyler Eifert 2-yard pass from Andy Dalton (Mike Nugent kick), 4:42. Bengals 14–3. Drive: 14 plays, 80 yards, 6:42.
- CLE – Duke Johnson 12-yard pass from Johnny Manziel (Travis Coons kick), 0:27. Bengals 14–10. Drive: 10 plays, 92 yards, 4:15.

Third quarter

- CIN – Mike Nugent 28-yard field goal, 4:09. Bengals 17–10. Drive: 9 plays, 39 yards, 4:57.

Fourth quarter

- CIN – Mohamed Sanu 25-yard run (Mike Nugent kick), 13:35. Bengals 24–10. Drive: 8 plays, 91 yards, 4:31.
- CIN – Tyler Eifert 19-yard pass from Andy Dalton (Mike Nugent kick), 7:48. Bengals 31–10. Drive: 8 plays, 58 yards, 3:55.

Top passers

- CLE – Johnny Manziel – 15/33, 168 yards, TD
- CIN – Andy Dalton – 21/27, 234 yards, 3 TD

Top rushers

- CLE – Isaiah Crowell – 10 rushes, 38 yards
- CIN – Giovani Bernard – 13 rushes, 72 yards

Top receivers

- CLE – Duke Johnson – 2 receptions, 38 yards, TD
- CIN – Marvin Jones – 5 receptions, 78 yards

Top tacklers

- CLE – Karlos Dansby – 8 tackles, 3 assists
- CIN – Carlos Dunlap – 4 tackles, 2 sacks

The Bengals defeated the Johnny Manziel-led Browns and improved to a franchise-best 8–0 on the season. Tight end Tyler Eifert caught three touchdown passes from Andy Dalton in the game, as he tied the team record for TDs in a season by a TE (9).

==== Week 10: vs. Houston Texans ====
Week Ten: Houston Texans at Cincinnati Bengals – Game summary

| Quarter | 1 | 2 | 3 | 4 | Total |
|---|---|---|---|---|---|
| Texans | 0 | 3 | 0 | 7 | 10 |
| Bengals | 3 | 3 | 0 | 0 | 6 |

at Paul Brown Stadium, Cincinnati, Ohio

- Date: November 16
- Game time: 8:30 pm. EST
- Game weather: 53 °F (12 °C), light showers
- Game attendance: 61,381
- Referee: Walt Coleman
- TV announcers (ESPN): Mike Tirico, Jon Gruden and Lisa Salters
- Recap, Gamebook

Game information

First quarter

- CIN – Mike Nugent 42-yard field goal, 1:28. Bengals 3–0. Drive: 7 plays, 27 yards, 4:33.

Second quarter

- HOU – Nick Novak 22-yard field goal, 12:16. Tied 3–3. Drive: 12 plays, 74 yards, 4:12.
- CIN – Mike Nugent 39 yard field goal, 5:26. Bengals 6–3. Drive: 15 plays, 62 yards, 6:50.

Third quarter

- No scoring plays.

Fourth quarter

- HOU – DeAndre Hopkins 22-yard pass from T. J. Yates (Nick Novak kick), 14:20. Texans 10–6. Drive: 9 plays, 79 yards, 3:01.

Top passers

- HOU – Brian Hoyer – 12/22, 123 yards, 1 INT
- CIN – Andy Dalton – 22/38, 197 yards, 1 INT

Top rushers

- HOU – Jonathan Grimes – 6 carries, 33 yards
- CIN – Giovani Bernard – 8 carries, 36 yards

Top receivers

- HOU – DeAndre Hopkins – 5 receptions, 57 yards, 1 TD
- CIN – A. J. Green – 5 receptions, 67 yards

Top tacklers

- HOU – Benardrick McKinney – 9 tackles, 1 TFL
- CIN – George Iloka – 8 tackles, 1 TFL

The Bengals looked to remain undefeated as they hosted J. J. Watt and the Houston Texans. The Texans' starting quarterback, Brian Hoyer, left the game with a concussion, but recently signed backup T. J. Yates threw a fourth-quarter touchdown pass to DeAndre Hopkins. Andy Dalton drove the Bengals into Texans territory, but A. J. Green fumbled, sealing the Texans' 10–6 victory over the Bengals.

With the loss, the Bengals dropped to 8–1, and were no longer undefeated, leaving the New England Patriots as the only unbeaten team in the AFC at that point.

==== Week 11: at Arizona Cardinals ====
Week Eleven: Cincinnati Bengals at Arizona Cardinals – Game summary

| Quarter | 1 | 2 | 3 | 4 | Total |
|---|---|---|---|---|---|
| Bengals | 7 | 7 | 0 | 17 | 31 |
| Cardinals | 0 | 7 | 21 | 6 | 34 |

at University of Phoenix Stadium, Glendale, Arizona

- Date: November 22
- Game time: 8:30 pm. EST/6:30 p.m. MST
- Game weather: 72 °F (22 °C), mostly clear – retractable roof open
- Game attendance: 64,745
- Referee: Terry McAulay
- TV announcers (NBC): Al Michaels, Cris Collinsworth and Michele Tafoya
- Recap, Gamebook

Game information

First quarter

- CIN – Tyler Eifert 3-yard pass from Andy Dalton (Mike Nugent kick), 0:22. Bengals 7–0. Drive: 7 plays, 64 yards, 3:08.

Second quarter

- ARI – Darren Fells 18-yard pass from Carson Palmer (Chandler Catanzaro kick), 7:39. Tied 7–7. Drive: 10 plays, 80 yards, 5:38.
- CIN – Jeremy Hill 3-yard run (Mike Nugent kick), 1:07. Bengals 14–7. Drive: 14 plays, 80 yards, 8:37.

Third quarter

- ARI – J. J. Nelson 64-yard pass from Carson Palmer (Chandler Catanzaro kick), 11:21. Tied 14–14. Drive: 4 plays, 80 yards, 1:41.
- ARI – John Brown 18-yard pass from Carson Palmer (Chandler Catanzaro kick), 5:32. Cardinals 21–14. Drive: 8 plays, 66 yards, 4:45.
- ARI – David Johnson 16-yard pass from Carson Palmer (Chandler Catanzaro kick), 1:26. Cardinals 28–14. Drive: 5 plays, 49 yards, 2:43.

Fourth quarter

- CIN – Jeremy Hill 1 yard run (Mike Nugent kick), 1:26. Cardinals 28–21. Drive: 11 plays, 80 yards, 5:00.
- ARI – Chandler Catanzaro 24 yard field goal, 6:27. Cardinals 31–21. Drive: 4 plays, 4 yards, 2:14.
- CIN – Tyler Eifert 10 yard pass from Andy Dalton, 3:44. Cardinals 31–28. Drive: 8 plays, 50 yards, 2:43.
- CIN – Mike Nugent 43 yard field goal, 1:03. Tied 31–31. Drive: 8 plays, 59 yards, 1:42.
- ARI – Chandler Catanzaro 32 yard field goal, 0:02. Cardinals 34–31. Drive: 6 plays, 70 yards, 1:02.

Top passers

- CIN – Andy Dalton – 22/39, 315 yards, 2 TD
- ARI – Carson Palmer – 20/31, 317 yards, 4 TD, 2 INT

Top rushers

- CIN – Jeremy Hill – 13 rushes, 45 yards, 2 TD
- ARI – Chris Johnson – 18 rushes, 63 yards

Top receivers

- CIN – Giovani Bernard – 8 receptions, 128 yards
- ARI – J. J. Nelson – 4 receptions, 142 yards, 1 TD

Top tacklers

- CIN – Vontaze Burfict – 8 Tackles, 7 Solo
- ARI – Kevin Minter – 10 Tackles, 7 Solo

The 8–1 Bengals traveled to Arizona to face the 7–2 Cardinals and former Bengals #1 overall draft pick Carson Palmer.

In the first quarter, the Bengals would strike first as Dalton found Tyler Eifert on a 3-yard touchdown pass to give them a 7–0 lead for the only score of the period. In the second quarter, the Cardinals would tie the game when Palmer found Darren Fells from 18 yards out to tie things up at 7. The Bengals would retake the lead as Jeremy Hill ran into the end zone from 2 yards out to give them a 14–7 lead at halftime. In the 3rd quarter, it was all Cardinals, as Carson Palmer found J.J Nelson for a 64-yard touchdown to tie the game at 14. Arizona would take their first lead of the game as Palmer found John Brown from 18 yards out to give them a 21–14 lead. The Cardinals would extend the lead as Palmer found David Johnson from 16 yards out to extend the lead to 28–14. In the fourth quarter, the Bengals would cut into the lead as Hill ran in his second touchdown of the night, this one from 1 yard out, to cut the deficit to 28–21. After a Dalton fumble, Chandler Catanzaro would extend the Arizona lead to 31–21. However, the Bengals would make the game close once again, as Eifert caught his second touchdown of the night, cutting the lead to 31–28. Cincinnati would tie the game 31–31 on a Mike Nugent field goal. However, Palmer and the Cardinals offense went right down the field to get into the field goal range. The most notable part of this drive, and, perhaps, the game, was an unsportsmanlike conduct penalty by Bengals defensive tackle Domata Peko. The penalty was for mimicking the count during the huddle. The penalty made the field goal easier, and Catanzaro nailed the game winner from 32 yards out as time expired to end the game.

With the loss, the Bengals fell to 8–2 and they finished 3-1 against the NFC West. The loss also dropped them to 0–4 all time against the Cardinals on the road, and 0–3 all time against them in Arizona.

==== Week 12: vs. St. Louis Rams ====
Week Twelve: St. Louis Rams at Cincinnati Bengals – Game summary

| Quarter | 1 | 2 | 3 | 4 | Total |
|---|---|---|---|---|---|
| Rams | 0 | 7 | 0 | 0 | 7 |
| Bengals | 7 | 10 | 14 | 0 | 31 |

at Paul Brown Stadium, Cincinnati, Ohio

- Date: November 29
- Game time: 1:00 pm. EST
- Game weather: 41 °F (5 °C), cloudy
- Game attendance: 61,022
- Referee: Craig Wrolstad
- TV announcers (Fox): Thom Brennaman, Charles Davis and Tony Siragusa
- Recap, Gamebook

Game information

First quarter

- CIN – A. J. Green 10-yard pass from Andy Dalton (Mike Nugent kick), 9:23. Bengals 7–0. Drive: 7 plays, 63 yards, 3:48.

Second quarter

- CIN – Mike Nugent 23 yard field goal, 10:14. Bengals 10–0. Drive: 14 plays, 85 yards, 6:49.
- STL – Tavon Austin 5-yard run (Zach Hocker kick), 8:34. Bengals 10–7. Drive: 4 plays, 80 yards, 1:41.
- CIN – Tyler Eifert 22-yard pass from Andy Dalton (Mike Nugent kick), 3:27. Bengals 17–7. Drive: 10 plays, 80 yards, 5:02.

Third quarter

- CIN – A. J. Green 18 yard pass from Andy Dalton (Mike Nugent kick), 7:01. Bengals 24–7. Drive: 3 plays, 72 yards, 1:31.
- CIN – Leon Hall 19-yard interception return (Mike Nugent kick), 5:20. Bengals 31–7. Drive: 3 plays, −3 yards, 1:41.

Fourth quarter

- No scoring plays.

Top passers

- STL – Nick Foles – 30/46, 228 yards, 3 INT
- CIN – Andy Dalton – 20/27, 233 yards, 3 TD

Top rushers

- STL – Tavon Austin – 4 carries, 63 yards, 1 TD
- CIN – Jeremy Hill – 16 carries, 86 yds.

Top receivers

- STL – Kenny Britt – 6 receptions, 63 yards
- CIN – A. J. Green – 6 receptions, 61 yards, 2 TD

Top tacklers

- STL – Mark Barron – 10 tackles, 7 solo
- CIN – Dre Kirkpatrick – 9 tackles

In Week 12, the Bengals looked to bounce back from two straight losses after starting 8–0. Rams quarterback Nick Foles threw 3 Interceptions and the Bengals routed the Rams in Cincinnati, 31–7, to move to 9–2. With a Pittsburgh to loss to Seattle later that evening, the Bengals re-gained a 3-game lead in the AFC North Division.

==== Week 13: at Cleveland Browns ====
Week Thirteen: Cincinnati Bengals at Cleveland Browns – Game summary

| Quarter | 1 | 2 | 3 | 4 | Total |
|---|---|---|---|---|---|
| Bengals | 7 | 13 | 14 | 3 | 37 |
| Browns | 0 | 3 | 0 | 0 | 3 |

at FirstEnergy Stadium, Cleveland, Ohio

- Date: December 6
- Game time: 1:00 pm. EST
- Game weather: 45 °F (7 °C), sunny
- Game attendance: 64,775
- Referee: Jeff Triplette
- TV announcers (Fox): Justin Kutcher, Matt Millen and Peter Schrager
- Recap, Gamebook

Game information

First quarter

- CIN – Andy Dalton 3-yard run (Mike Nugent kick), 3:48. Bengals 7–0. Drive: 10 plays, 84 yards, 4:40.

Second quarter

- CIN – A. J. Green 23-yard pass from Andy Dalton (Mike Nugent kick), 13:45. Bengals 14–0. Drive: 3 plays, 54 yards, 1:15.
- CIN – Mike Nugent 44-yard field goal, 6:28. Bengals 17–0. Drive: 6 plays, 34 yards, 3:43.
- CIN – Mike Nugent 40-yard field goal, 3:24. Bengals 20–0. Drive: 4 plays, 5 yards, 1:22.
- CLE – Travis Coons 47-yard field goal, 0:03. Bengals 20–3. Drive: 10 plays, 50 yards, 3:20.

Third quarter

- CIN – Jeremy Hill 1-yard run (Mike Nugent kick), 7:55. Bengals 27–3. Drive: 7 plays, 62 yards, 3:30.
- CIN – Marvin Jones 21-yard pass from Andy Dalton (Mike Nugent kick), 0:46. Bengals 34–3. Drive: 7 plays, 62 yards, 3:53.

Fourth quarter

- CIN – Mike Nugent 20-yard field goal, 5:47. Bengals 37–3. Drive: 9 plays, 31 yards, 5:44.

Top passers

- CIN – Andy Dalton – 14/19, 220 yards, 2 TD
- CLE – Austin Davis – 25/38, 230 yards, INT

Top rushers

- CIN – Jeremy Hill – 22 rushes, 98 yards, TD
- CLE – Isaiah Crowell – 11 rushes, 62 yards

Top receivers

- CIN – A. J. Green – 5 receptions, 128 yards, TD
- CLE – Brian Hartline – 8 receptions, 83 yards

Top tacklers

- CIN – Vontaze Burfict – 6 tackles, 2 assists
- CLE – Craig Robertson – 5 tackles, 2 assists

With the convincing road win, the Bengals improved to 10–2 on the season, sweeping the Browns for the first time since 2011. This was also their largest win in the Bengals-Browns series.

==== Week 14: vs. Pittsburgh Steelers ====
Week Fourteen: Pittsburgh Steelers at Cincinnati Bengals – Game summary

| Quarter | 1 | 2 | 3 | 4 | Total |
|---|---|---|---|---|---|
| Steelers | 7 | 9 | 7 | 10 | 33 |
| Bengals | 0 | 7 | 3 | 10 | 20 |

at Paul Brown Stadium, Cincinnati, Ohio

- Date: December 13
- Game time: 1:00 pm. EST
- Game weather: 63 °F (17 °C), cloudy
- Game attendance: 65,564
- Referee: John Parry
- TV announcers (CBS): Greg Gumbel, Trent Green and Jamie Erdahl
- Recap, Gamebook

Game information

First quarter

- PIT – DeAngelo Williams 1-yard run (Chris Boswell kick), 9:23. Steelers 7–0. Drive: 11 plays, 80 yards, 5:37.

Second quarter

- PIT – Chris Boswell 42-yard Field Goal, 12:33. Steelers 10–0. Drive: 13 plays, 66 yards, 7:27.
- PIT – Chris Boswell 47-yard Field Goal, 7:00. Steelers 13–0. Drive: 8 plays, 27 yards, 3:46.
- CIN – A. J. Green 66-yard pass from A. J. McCarron (Mike Nugent kick), 6:23. Steelers 13–7. Drive: 2 plays, 80 yards, 0:37.
- PIT – Chris Boswell 45-yard Field Goal, 0:22. Steelers 16–7. Drive: 6 plays, 27 yards, 0:42.

Third quarter

- PIT – William Gay 23-yard interception return (Chris Boswell kick), 14:10. Steelers 23–7. Drive: 2 plays, 5 yards, 0:50.
- CIN – Mike Nugent 46-yard Field Goal, 10:10. Steelers 23–10. Drive: 9 plays, 40 yards, 4:00.

Fourth quarter

- PIT – Chris Boswell 31-yard Field Goal, 14:56. Steelers 26–10. Drive: 12 plays, 64 yards, 7:04.
- CIN – Mike Nugent 27-yard Field Goal, 10:06. Steelers 26–13. Drive: 10 plays, 71 yards, 4:50.
- PIT – DeAngelo Williams 1-yard run (Chris Boswell kick), 3:49. Steelers 33–13. Drive: 4 plays, 16 yards, 1:25.
- CIN – Rex Burkhead 5-yard pass from A. J. McCarron (Mike Nugent kick), 1:03. Steelers 33–20. Drive: 10 plays, 80 yards, 2:46.

Top passers

- PIT – Ben Roethlisberger – 30/39, 282 yards, 1 INT
- CIN – A. J. McCarron – 22/32, 280 yards, 2 TD, 2 INT

Top rushers

- PIT – DeAngelo Williams – 23 rushes, 76 yards, 2 TD
- CIN – Giovani Bernard – 6 rushes, 40 yards

Top receivers

- PIT – Antonio Brown – 7 receptions, 87 yards
- CIN – A. J. Green – 6 receptions, 132 yards, 1 TD

Top tacklers

- PIT – Lawrence Timmons – 8 tackles
- CIN – Vontaze Burfict – 11 tackles

Not only did the Bengals lose 33–20 and drop to 10–3, but lost quarterback Andy Dalton to a broken thumb in the first quarter. He missed the rest of the season and his loss shattered the Bengals' Super Bowl hopes. Second year quarterback A. J. McCarron took over for the game's remainder. Along with Dalton, Tyler Eifert, who returned from a stinger, left the game with a concussion.

==== Week 15: at San Francisco 49ers ====
Week Fifteen: Cincinnati Bengals at San Francisco 49ers – Game summary

| Quarter | 1 | 2 | 3 | 4 | Total |
|---|---|---|---|---|---|
| Bengals | 0 | 21 | 3 | 0 | 24 |
| 49ers | 0 | 0 | 7 | 7 | 14 |

at Levi's Stadium, Santa Clara, California

- Date: December 20
- Game time: 4:25 pm. EST/1:25 pm. PST
- Game weather: 52 °F (11 °C), cloudy
- Game attendance: 70,799
- Referee: Ron Torbert
- TV announcers (CBS): Spero Dedes, Solomon Wilcots and Jay Feely
- Recap, Gamebook

Game information

First quarter

- CIN – Jeremy Hill 1 yard run (Mike Nugent kick), 5:16. Bengals 7–0. Drive: 5 plays, 11 yards, 2:45.
- CIN – Jeremy Hill 1 yard run (Mike Nugent kick), 1:17. Bengals 14–0. Drive: 5 plays, 36 yards, 2:05.
- CIN – Tyler Kroft 20-yard pass from A. J. McCarron (Mike Nugent kick), 0:53. Bengals 21–0. Drive: 1 play, 20 yards, 0:05.

Second quarter

- No scoring plays.

Third quarter

- CIN – Mike Nugent 22 yard field goal, 8:40. Bengals 24–0. Drive: 13 plays, 70 yards, 6:20.
- SF – Bruce Miller 1 yard run (Phil Dawson kick), 3:14. Bengals 24–7. Drive: 5 plays, 46 yards, 1:36.

Fourth quarter

- SF – Anquan Boldin 15-yard pass from Blaine Gabbert (Phil Dawson kick), 2:17. Bengals 24–14. Drive: 11 plays, 72 yards, 3:53.

Top passers

- CIN – A. J. McCarron – 15/21, 192 yards, 1 TD
- SF – Blaine Gabbert – 30/50, 295 yards, 1 TD, 3 INT

Top rushers

- CIN – Giovani Bernard – 14 carries, 33 yards
- SF – Shaun Draughn – 9 carries, 38 yards

Top receivers

- CIN – Marvin Jones – 4 receptions, 89 yards
- SF – Anquan Boldin – 8 receptions, 74 yards, 1 TD

Top tacklers

- CIN – Rey Maualuga – 10 tackles
- SF – NaVorro Bowman – 11 tackles

This was A. J. McCarron's first game as starting quarterback, and the Bengals' first win at San Francisco since 1974.

With the win, the Bengals improved to 11–3. However, due to Pittsburgh beating Denver, they were unable to clinch the AFC North.

==== Week 16: at Denver Broncos ====
Week Sixteen: Cincinnati Bengals at Denver Broncos – Game summary

| Quarter | 1 | 2 | 3 | 4 | OT | Total |
|---|---|---|---|---|---|---|
| Bengals | 7 | 7 | 0 | 3 | 0 | 17 |
| Broncos | 0 | 3 | 7 | 7 | 3 | 20 |

at Sports Authority Field at Mile High, Denver, Colorado

- Date: December 28
- Game time: 8:30 pm. EST/6:30 pm. MST
- Game weather: 16 °F (−9 °C), mostly cloudy
- Game attendance: 76,868
- Referee: Ed Hochuli
- TV announcers (ESPN): Mike Tirico, Jon Gruden and Lisa Salters
- Recap, Gamebook

Game information

First quarter

- CIN – A. J. Green 5-yard pass from A. J. McCarron (Mike Nugent kick), 7:26. Bengals 7–0. Drive: 15 plays, 80 yards, 7:34.

Second quarter

- CIN – Mohamed Sanu 6-yard run (Mike Nugent kick), 10:51. Bengals 14–0. Drive: 13 plays, 90 yards, 7:50.
- DEN – Brandon McManus 23-yard field goal, 0:14. Bengals 14–3. Drive: 7 plays, 60 yards in 2:12.

Third quarter

- DEN – Emmanuel Sanders 8-yard pass from Brock Osweiler (Brandon McManus kick), 10:14 . Bengals 14–10. Drive: 11 plays, 81 yards, 4:46.

Fourth quarter

- DEN – C. J. Anderson 39-yard run (Brandon McManus kick), 11:17. Broncos 17–14. Drive: 2 plays, 52 yards, 0:34.
- CIN – Mike Nugent 52 yard field goal, 6:46. Tied 17–17. Drive: 11 plays, 46 yards, 4:31.

Overtime

- DEN – Brandon McManus 37 yard field goal, 10:00. Broncos 20–17. Drive: 14 plays, 61 yards, 5:00.

Top passers

- CIN – A. J. McCarron – 22/35, 200 yards, 1 TD
- DEN – Brock Osweiler – 27/39, 299 yards, 1 TD

Top rushers

- CIN – Jeremy Hill – 19 carries, 63 yards
- DEN – C. J. Anderson – 9 carries, 73 yards, 1 TD

Top receivers

- CIN – A. J. Green – 5 receptions, 57 yards, 1 TD
- DEN – Owen Daniels – 5 receptions, 70 yards

Top tacklers

- CIN – Dre Kirkpatrick – 7 tackles, 7 solo
- DEN – Danny Trevathan – 12 tackles, 8 solo

Due to the Steelers' loss to the Ravens the previous day, the Bengals entered the game as the AFC North champions. The Bengals rushed out to a 14–0 lead in the first half on a McCarron touchdown pass and a Mohamed Sanu rush, but Denver cut the deficit to 11 points as Brandon McManus nailed a short 23-yard field goal with just 18 seconds remaining before halftime. In the second half, momentum shifted mightily after a missed field goal by Mike Nugent in the third. Emmanuel Sanders hauled in an 8-yard pass from Brock Osweiler to cut the deficit to 14–10, and Denver claimed the lead for the first time in the game on a 39-yard touchdown run by C. J. Anderson with 11:17 remaining in the 4th Quarter. The Bengals marched down the field to tie the game on Mike Nugent's season-long 52-yard field goal, making the score 17–17 at the end of regulation. The tired Bengals failed to put any points on the board in the extra period, allowing a 37-yard McManus field goal to make the score 20–17 Denver. A botched snap on the ensuing Bengals drive was recovered by the Broncos, ending the game and Cincinnati's hopes for a first-round bye in the playoffs. With the loss, the Bengals fell to 11–4. They would finish 6-2 on the road and 3-1 against the AFC West.

Despite losing, the Bengals were able to clinch the AFC North with the Steelers' loss to the Ravens, as stated before.

The loss was also the 10th straight in Denver for the Bengals, dating back to 1975.

This would be both the last time Bengals clinched both a playoff berth and the AFC North until 2021.

==== Week 17: vs. Baltimore Ravens ====
Week Seventeen: Baltimore Ravens at Cincinnati Bengals – Game summary

| Quarter | 1 | 2 | 3 | 4 | Total |
|---|---|---|---|---|---|
| Ravens | 0 | 9 | 0 | 7 | 16 |
| Bengals | 0 | 7 | 14 | 3 | 24 |

at Paul Brown Stadium, Cincinnati, Ohio

- Date: January 3, 2016
- Game time: 1:00 pm. EST
- Game weather: 35 °F (2 °C), mostly cloudy
- Game attendance: 57,254
- Referee: Carl Cheffers
- TV announcers (Fox): Thom Brennaman, Charles Davis and Tony Siragusa
- Recap, Gamebook

Game information

First quarter

- No scoring plays

Second quarter

- BAL – Justin Tucker 28-yard field goal, 12:56. Ravens 3–0. Drive: 7 plays, 38 yards, 2:14.
- BAL – Justin Tucker 50 yard field goal, 5:00. Ravens 6–0. Drive: 10 plays, 33 yards, 4:24.
- CIN – Tyler Eifert 22-yard pass from A. J. McCarron (Mike Nugent kick), 1:56. Bengals 7–6. Drive: 8 plays, 81 yards, 3:06.
- BAL – Justin Tucker 49 yard field goal, 0:03. Ravens 9–7. Drive: 10 plays, 55 yards, 1:49.

Third quarter

- CIN – A. J. Green 5-yard pass from A. J. McCarron (Mike Nugent kick), 11:22. Bengals 14–9. Drive: 5 plays, 33 yards, 2:34.
- CIN – Jeremy Hill 38-yard run (Mike Nugent kick), 7:05. Bengals 21–9. Drive: 6 plays, 62 yards, 2:12.

Fourth quarter

- CIN – Mike Nugent 52 yard field goal, 4:11. Bengals 24–9. Drive: 8 plays, 21 yards, 4:27.
- BAL – Kyle Juszczyk 2-yard pass from Ryan Mallett (Justin Tucker kick), 1:47. Bengals 24–16. Drive: 8 plays, 75 yards, 2:19.

Top passers

- BAL – Ryan Mallett – 30/56, 292 yards, 1 TD
- CIN – A. J. McCarron – 17/27, 160 yards, 2 TD

Top rushers

- BAL – Javorius Allen – 15 carries, 38 yards
- CIN – Jeremy Hill – 16 carries, 96 yards, 1 TD

Top receivers

- BAL – Kamar Aiken – 5 receptions, 76 yards
- CIN – Tyler Eifert – 4 receptions, 51 yards, 1 TD

Top tacklers

- BAL – C. J. Mosley – 12 tackles, 4 solo, 1 sack
- CIN – Vontaze Burfict – 12 tackles, 8 solo

Cincinnati returned home to Paul Brown Stadium to face the AFC North rival Baltimore Ravens in the final game of the NFL regular season. After offensive struggles by both teams during the opening quarter, the Ravens got on the board with a 28-yard field goal by Justin Tucker. Later on in the quarter, Tucker would add three more with another field goal, this time from 50 yards out. With 1:56 remaining in the first half, Tyler Eifert, back after missing two games due to injury, caught a 22-yard pass from McCarron as the Bengals took the lead, 7–6. Baltimore would later retake the lead, 9–7, as time expired in the half with a third Tucker field goal from 49 yards. Cincinnati came out strong in the second half, scoring 17 unanswered points en route to the 24–16 victory. 57,254 were in attendance, the smallest crowd at Paul Brown Stadium of the season.

With the win, the Bengals swept the Ravens for the second straight year and finished the season tying their franchise-best record in a 16-game season at 12–4. However, the Broncos' win over the Chargers later on in the day gave the Bengals the #3 seed in the postseason. Cincinnati ended the year 6-2 at home and 5-1 against the AFC North.

=== Postseason ===
==== AFC Wild Card Playoffs: vs. (6) Pittsburgh Steelers ====
AFC Wild Card Playoffs: (6) Pittsburgh Steelers at (3) Cincinnati Bengals – Game summary

| Quarter | 1 | 2 | 3 | 4 | Total |
|---|---|---|---|---|---|
| Steelers | 0 | 6 | 9 | 3 | 18 |
| Bengals | 0 | 0 | 0 | 16 | 16 |

at Paul Brown Stadium, Cincinnati, Ohio

- Date: January 9, 2016
- Game time: 8:15 p.m. EST
- Game weather: 51 °F (11 °C), light drizzle
- Game attendance: 63,257
- Referee: John Parry
- TV announcers (CBS): Jim Nantz, Phil Simms and Tracy Wolfson
- Recap, Gamebook

Game information

First quarter

- No scoring plays.

Second quarter

- PIT – Chris Boswell 39-yard field goal, 2:32. Steelers 3–0. Drive: 6 plays, 20 yards, 2:30.
- PIT – Chris Boswell 30-yard field goal, 0:37. Steelers 6–0. Drive: 10 plays, 63 yards, 1:16.

Third quarter

- PIT – Chris Boswell 34-yard field goal, 10:09. Steelers 9–0. Drive: 5 plays, 46 yards, 2:04.
- PIT – Martavis Bryant 10-yard pass from Ben Roethlisberger (two-point conversion failed), 5:02. Steelers 15–0. Drive: 6 plays, 82 yards, 3:29.

Fourth quarter

- CIN – Jeremy Hill 1-yard run (Mike Nugent kick), 13:57. Steelers 15–7. Drive: 3 plays, 46 yards, 0:50.
- CIN – Mike Nugent 36-yard field goal, 5:12. Steelers 15–10. Drive: 13 plays, 70 yards, 5:59.
- CIN – A. J. Green 25-yard pass from A. J. McCarron (two-point conversion failed), 1:50. Bengals 16–15. Drive: 7 plays, 45 yards, 1:38.
- PIT – Chris Boswell 35-yard field goal, 0:14. Steelers 18–16. Drive: 9 plays, 74 yards, 1:09.

Top passers

- PIT – Ben Roethlisberger – 18/32, 229 yards, TD
- CIN – A. J. McCarron – 23/40, 212 yards, TD, INT

Top rushers

- PIT – Jordan Todman – 11 rushes, 65 yards
- CIN – Jeremy Hill – 12 rushes, 50 yards, TD

Top receivers

- PIT – Antonio Brown – 7 rec, 119 yards
- CIN – A. J. Green – 5 rec, 71 yards, TD

The Steelers put up a 15–0 lead before the Bengals scored 16 unanswered in the fourth quarter to lead it 16–15. The Steelers drove down the field when a series of penalties taken by Adam Jones and Vontaze Burfict put them into field goal range late in the game, and Chris Boswell kicked the winning field goal to make it 18–16. A. J. McCarron tried to go for a miracle with 0:06 left in the game, but it fell incomplete, leading to the Bengals being one-and-done for the fifth season in a row and dropping their overall record to 12–5.

The Bengals are the first team to go to the playoffs for 5 consecutive seasons and be one-and-done in all of them.

The team also dropped to 0–2 against the Steelers in the postseason and 0–7 under Marvin Lewis in the postseason. This would prove the Bengals’ last playoff appearance in his tenure, as his contract would not be renewed after the 2018 season.

== Standings ==
=== Division ===
AFC North
| | W | L | T | PCT | DIV | CONF | PF | PA | STK |
|---|---|---|---|---|---|---|---|---|---|
| ^{(3)} Cincinnati Bengals | 12 | 4 | 0 | .750 | 5–1 | 9–3 | 419 | 279 | W1 |
| ^{(6)} Pittsburgh Steelers | 10 | 6 | 0 | .625 | 3–3 | 7–5 | 423 | 319 | W1 |
| Baltimore Ravens | 5 | 11 | 0 | .313 | 3–3 | 4–8 | 328 | 401 | L1 |
| Cleveland Browns | 3 | 13 | 0 | .188 | 1–5 | 2–10 | 278 | 432 | L3 |

=== Conference ===
AFC
| # | Team | Division | W | L | T | PCT | DIV | CONF | SOS | SOV | STK |
|---|---|---|---|---|---|---|---|---|---|---|---|
Division Leaders
| 1 (Note: Denver finished ahead of New England and Cincinnati for the No. 1 seed based on head-to-head sweep. New England finished ahead of Cincinnati for the No. 2 seed based on record vs. common opponents — New England's cumulative record against Buffalo, Denver, Houston and Pittsburgh was 4–1, while Cincinnati's cumulative record against the same four teams was 2–3.) | Denver Broncos | West | 12 | 4 | 0 | .750 | 4–2 | 8–4 | .500 | .479 | W2 |
| 2 | New England Patriots | East | 12 | 4 | 0 | .750 | 4–2 | 9–3 | .473 | .448 | L2 |
| 3 | Cincinnati Bengals | North | 12 | 4 | 0 | .750 | 5–1 | 9–3 | .477 | .406 | W1 |
| 4 | Houston Texans | South | 9 | 7 | 0 | .563 | 5–1 | 7–5 | .496 | .410 | W3 |
Wild Cards
| 5 | Kansas City Chiefs | West | 11 | 5 | 0 | .688 | 5–1 | 10–2 | .496 | .432 | W10 |
| 6 (Note: Pittsburgh finished ahead of the New York Jets for the No. 6 seed and qualified for the last playoff spot based on record vs. common opponents — Pittsburgh's cumulative record against Cleveland, Indianapolis, New England and Oakland was 4–1, while the Jets' cumulative record against the same four teams was 3–2.) | Pittsburgh Steelers | North | 10 | 6 | 0 | .625 | 3–3 | 7–5 | .504 | .463 | W1 |
Did not qualify for the postseason
| 7 | New York Jets | East | 10 | 6 | 0 | .625 | 3–3 | 7–5 | .441 | .388 | L1 |
| 8 (Note: Buffalo finished ahead of Indianapolis based on head-to-head victory.) | Buffalo Bills | East | 8 | 8 | 0 | .500 | 4–2 | 7–5 | .508 | .438 | W2 |
| 9 | Indianapolis Colts | South | 8 | 8 | 0 | .500 | 4–2 | 6–6 | .500 | .406 | W2 |
| 10 | Oakland Raiders | West | 7 | 9 | 0 | .438 | 3–3 | 7–5 | .512 | .366 | L1 |
| 11 | Miami Dolphins | East | 6 | 10 | 0 | .375 | 1–5 | 4–8 | .469 | .469 | W2 |
| 12 (Note: Jacksonville finished ahead of Baltimore based on head-to-head victory.) | Jacksonville Jaguars | South | 5 | 11 | 0 | .313 | 2–4 | 5–7 | .473 | .375 | L3 |
| 13 | Baltimore Ravens | North | 5 | 11 | 0 | .313 | 3–3 | 4–8 | .508 | .425 | L1 |
| 14 | San Diego Chargers | West | 4 | 12 | 0 | .250 | 0–6 | 3–9 | .527 | .328 | L2 |
| 15 (Note: Cleveland finished ahead of Tennessee based on head-to-head victory.) | Cleveland Browns | North | 3 | 13 | 0 | .188 | 1–5 | 2–10 | .531 | .271 | L3 |
| 16 | Tennessee Titans | South | 3 | 13 | 0 | .188 | 1–5 | 1–11 | .492 | .375 | L4 |
Tiebreakers (Note: When breaking ties for three or more teams under the NFL's rules, they are first broken within divisions, then comparing only the highest ranked remaining team from each division.)
