= Paul Dawson (American football) =

American football player (born 1993)

No. 47
- Position: Linebacker

Personal information
- Born: January 13, 1993 (age 33); Dallas, Texas, U.S.
- Listed height: 6 ft 1 in (1.85 m)
- Listed weight: 240 lb (109 kg)

Career information
- High school: Skyline (Dallas)
- College: TCU
- NFL draft: 2015: 3rd round, 99th overall pick

Career history
- Cincinnati Bengals (2015–2016); Seattle Seahawks (2017); Saskatchewan Roughriders (2018); Vegas Vipers (2023)

Awards and highlights
- Consensus All-American (2014); Big 12 Defensive Player of the Year (2014); First-team All-Big 12 (2014); Second-team All-Big 12 (2013)

Career NFL statistics
- Total tackles: 16
- Stats at Pro Football Reference

Paul Dawson (born January 13, 1993) is an American former professional football player who was a linebacker in the National Football League (NFL) and Canadian Football League (CFL). He played college football for the TCU Horned Frogs and was selected by the Cincinnati Bengals in the third round of the 2015 NFL draft.

== Early life ==
Dawson is from an area in Dallas, Texas called Pleasant Grove. He graduated in 2011 from Skyline High School. where he was utilized at wide receiver, helping lead Skyline to a 9–3 overall record as a senior, including a 7–0 district record. Dawson finished the year as a top receiver, and nominated to all-conference in the 5A district.

== College career ==
With only a few division one offers as a wide receiver, Dawson decided to attend Trinity Valley Community College instead. There he converted himself to the defense side of the ball, to play linebacker. After showing legitimate potential in his freshman season, he signed to Texas Christian University during his unofficial visit. In 2014, Dawson was named a first team All-American by the Walter Camp Football Foundation as well as USA Today. Dawson was also named Big 12 Conference Defensive Player of the Year along with being named the most valuable player for TCU. His senior season included 140 tackles, 20 tackles for loss, 4 interceptions, and 5 sacks. In addition with being recognized as the top inside linebacker in the 2015 draft class.

== Professional career ==
Pre-draft measurables
Height	Weight	40-yard dash	10-yard split	20-yard split	20-yard shuttle	Three-cone drill	Vertical jump	Broad jump	Bench press
6 ft 0 in (1.83 m)	235 lb (107 kg)	4.83 s	1.60 s	2.80 s	4.49 s	6.76 s	28 in (0.71 m)	9 ft 9 in (2.97 m)	21 reps
All values from NFL Combine and Pro Day

=== Cincinnati Bengals ===
Dawson was selected by the Cincinnati Bengals in the third round (99th overall) in the 2015 NFL draft. Following the selection, Bengals defensive coordinator Paul Guenther compared him to Bengals Pro Bowl linebacker Vontaze Burfict. A projected first round pick entering the draft, Dawson was considered a steal when the Bengals selected him. On September 4, 2016, Dawson was waived by the Bengals and was signed to the practice squad. He was promoted to the active roster on December 23, 2016.

On September 2, 2017, Dawson was waived by the Bengals after injuring a bone in his wrist.

=== Seattle Seahawks ===
On November 14, 2017, Dawson was signed to the Seattle Seahawks' practice squad. He was promoted to the active roster on December 13, 2017.

On April 16, 2018, Dawson re-signed with the Seahawks. He was waived on May 7, 2018.

=== Saskatchewan Roughriders ===
On September 12, 2018, Dawson was signed to the Saskatchewan Roughriders of the Canadian Football League practice squad. He was promoted to the active roster on September 29, 2018.

=== Vegas Vipers ===
The Vegas Vipers of the XFL selected Dawson in the 7th round of the 2023 XFL Defensive Front Seven Draft. He was removed from the roster after the 2023 season on July 4, 2023.
