= Vincent Rey =

American football player (born 1987)

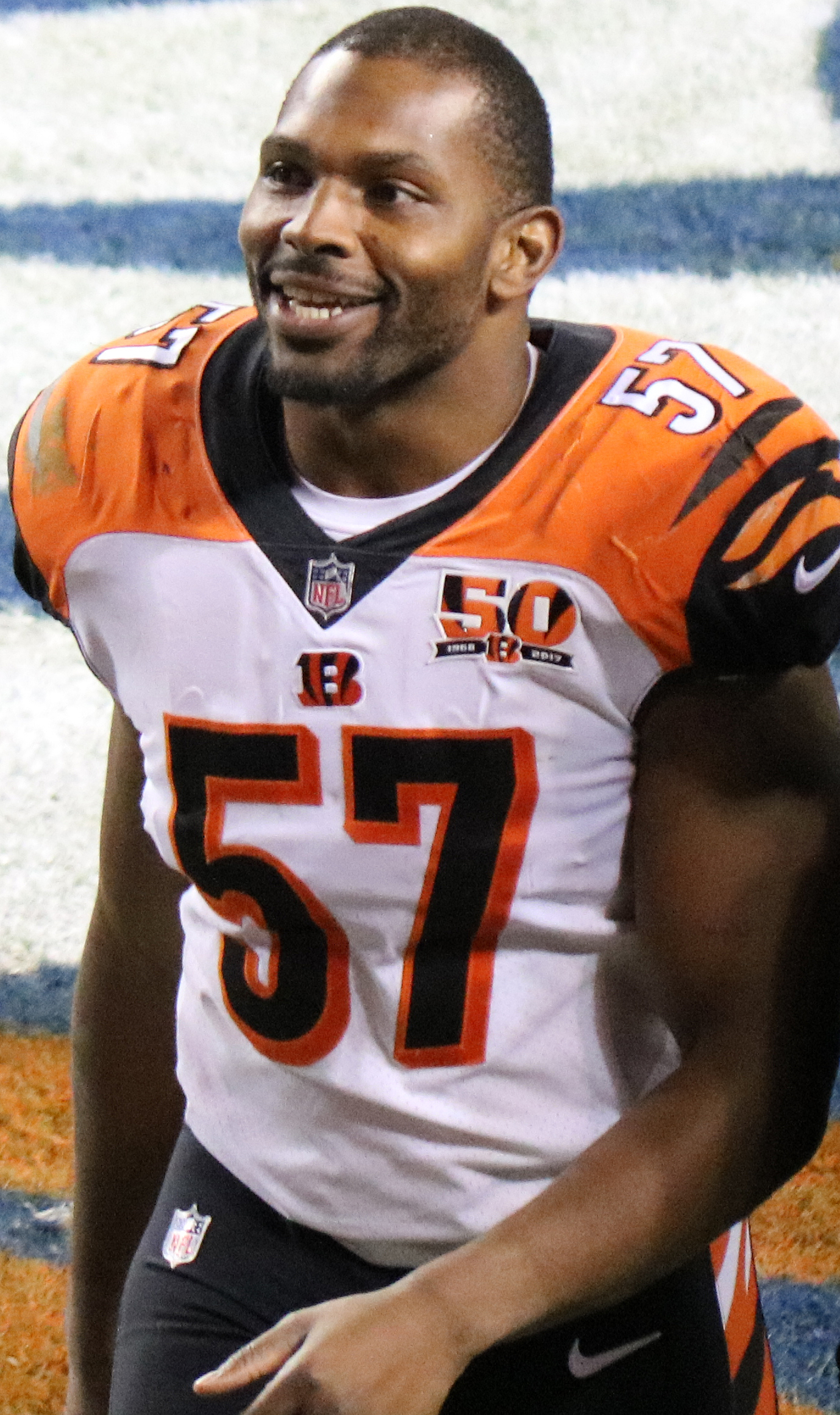
- Rey with the Cincinnati Bengals in 2017

No. 53, 57
- Position: Linebacker

Personal information
- Born: September 6, 1987 (age 39); Far Rockaway, New York, U.S.
- Listed height: 6 ft 0 in (1.83 m)
- Listed weight: 245 lb (111 kg)

Career information
- High school: Mercersburg (PA)
- College: Duke
- NFL draft: 2010: undrafted

Career history
- Cincinnati Bengals (2010−2018)

Awards and highlights
- Second-team All-ACC (2009)

Career NFL statistics
- Total tackles: 496
- Sacks: 6
- Forced fumbles: 2
- Fumble recoveries: 2
- Interceptions: 5
- Defensive touchdowns: 1
- Stats at Pro Football Reference

Vincent Rey (born September 6, 1987) is an American former professional football player who was a linebacker in the National Football League (NFL). He was signed by the Cincinnati Bengals as an undrafted free agent in 2010. He played college football for the Duke Blue Devils. He attended Mercersburg Academy and graduated in 2006.

== Professional career ==
Pre-draft measurables
Height	Weight	40-yard dash	10-yard split	20-yard split	20-yard shuttle	Three-cone drill	Vertical jump	Broad jump	Bench press
6 ft 2 in (1.88 m)	240 lb (109 kg)	4.58 s	1.59 s	2.59 s	4.28 s	6.89 s	38 1/2 in (0.98 m)	10 ft 6 in (3.20 m)	20 reps
All values from Pro Day

On April 26, 2010, the Cincinnati Bengals signed Rey to a two-year, $731,000 contract after he went undrafted in the 2010 NFL draft. He was waived on September 4, and re-signed to the practice squad the next day. On December 8, Rey was promoted to the Bengals' active roster and played in his first two career games in Weeks 15 and 16.

His first career start came on October 31, 2013 against the Miami Dolphins on Thursday Night Football. Due to an injury to starter Rey Maualuga, Rey was called upon to start in multiple games in 2013, and then again in 2014 with injuries to starter Vontaze Burfict. He showed an ability to line up at any linebacker position and had a strong command of the defense, often calling plays and setting formations when in the game. Rey's best game statistically came against the Baltimore Ravens in 2013, when he recorded 15 tackles, 3.0 sacks and an interception in a 20-17 overtime loss.

Rey signed a new two-year deal with the Bengals on March 14, 2014. On March 9, 2016, Rey signed a three-year, $11.5 million extension with the Bengals.

== NFL career statistics ==
Legend
**Bold**	Career high

=== Regular season ===
Year	Team	Games		Tackles					Interceptions					Fumbles			
Year	Team	GP	GS	Cmb	Solo	Ast	Sck	TFL	Int	Yds	TD	Lng	PD	FF	FR	Yds	TD
2010	CIN	2	0	3	2	1	0.0	0	0	0	0	0	0	0	0	0	0
2011	CIN	**16**	0	6	6	0	0.0	0	0	0	0	0	0	0	0	0	0
2012	CIN	**16**	1	21	16	5	1.0	1	0	0	0	0	1	0	0	0	0
2013	CIN	**16**	3	57	36	21	**4.0**	**5**	**2**	**29**	**1**	**25**	5	**1**	**1**	0	0
2014	CIN	**16**	**13**	**121**	61	**60**	0.0	1	0	0	0	0	5	**1**	0	0	0
2015	CIN	**16**	8	98	**64**	34	1.0	3	1	0	0	0	5	0	0	0	0
2016	CIN	**16**	12	86	51	35	0.0	1	1	6	0	6	**7**	0	**1**	**10**	0
2017	CIN	14	11	85	52	33	0.0	1	1	12	0	12	1	0	0	0	0
2018	CIN	**16**	2	19	11	8	0.0	1	0	0	0	0	0	0	0	0	0
		128	50	496	299	197	6.0	13	5	47	1	25	24	2	2	10	0

=== Playoffs ===
Year	Team	Games		Tackles					Interceptions					Fumbles			
Year	Team	GP	GS	Cmb	Solo	Ast	Sck	TFL	Int	Yds	TD	Lng	PD	FF	FR	Yds	TD
2011	CIN	**1**	0	0	0	0	0.0	0	0	0	0	0	0	0	0	0	0
2012	CIN	**1**	0	0	0	0	0.0	0	0	0	0	0	0	0	0	0	0
2013	CIN	**1**	0	1	1	0	0.0	0	0	0	0	0	0	0	0	0	0
2014	CIN	**1**	**1**	**11**	**5**	**6**	0.0	0	0	0	0	0	0	**1**	0	0	0
2015	CIN	**1**	**1**	2	1	1	0.0	0	0	0	0	0	**1**	0	0	0	0
		5	2	14	7	7	0.0	0	0	0	0	0	1	1	0	0	0

== Post-playing career ==
After his retirement in 2018, Rey took a job with the Bengals as the team chaplain starting in the 2021 season.
