= Josh Shaw (defensive back) =

American football player (born 1992)

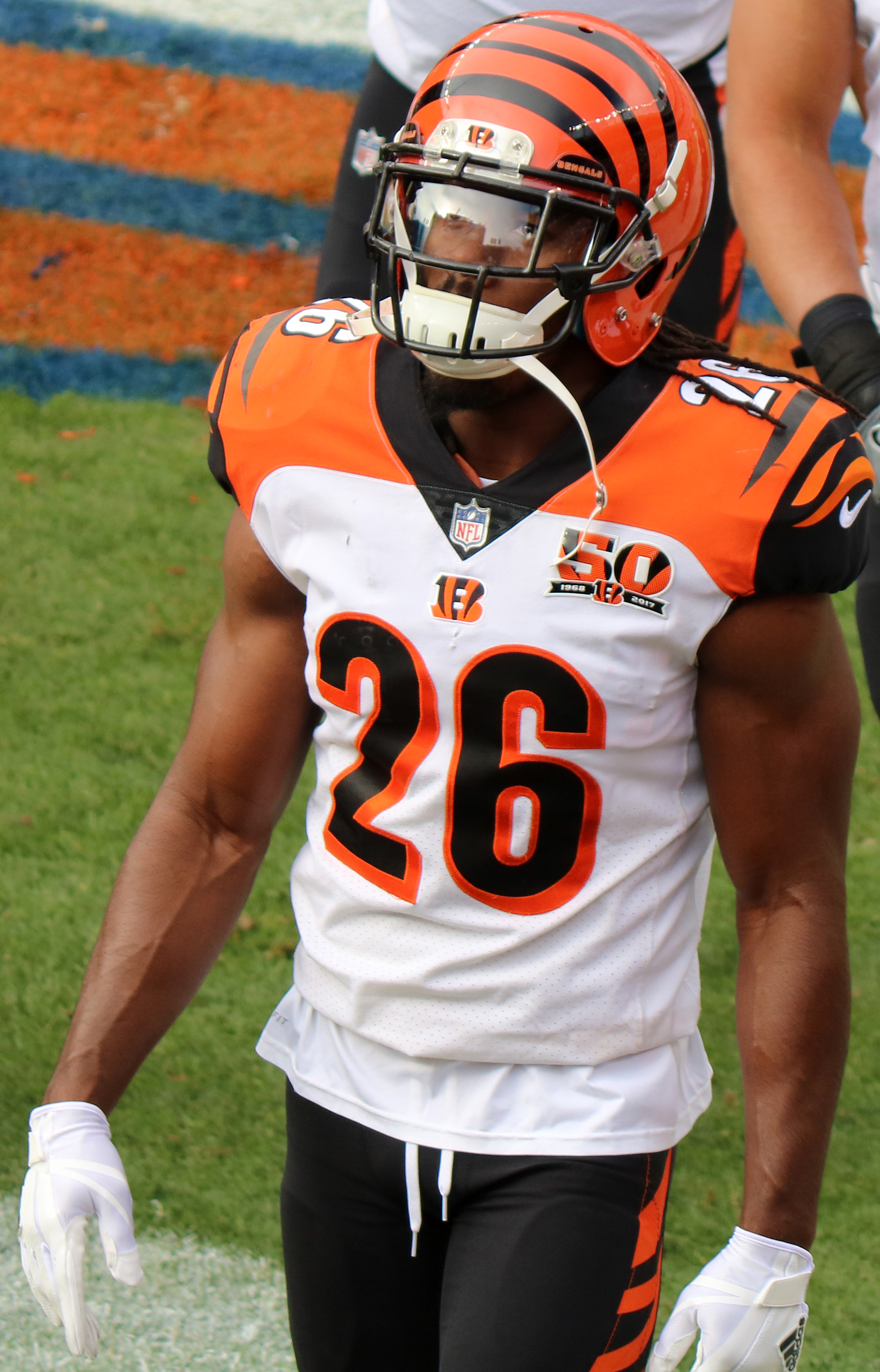
- Shaw with the Cincinnati Bengals in 2017

No. 26, 30
- Position: Cornerback

Personal information
- Born: March 27, 1992 (age 34); Palmdale, California, U.S.
- Listed height: 6 ft 1 in (1.85 m)
- Listed weight: 200 lb (91 kg)

Career information
- High school: Palmdale
- College: USC
- NFL draft: 2015: 4th round, 120th overall pick

Career history
- Cincinnati Bengals (2015–2017); Kansas City Chiefs (2018); Tampa Bay Buccaneers (2018); Arizona Cardinals (2019); Birmingham Stallions (2022)

Awards and highlights
- USFL champion (2022)

Career NFL statistics
- Total tackles: 127
- Fumble recoveries: 1
- Pass deflections: 7
- Interceptions: 1
- Stats at Pro Football Reference

Joshua James Shaw (born March 27, 1992) is an American former professional football player who was a cornerback in the National Football League (NFL). He previously played for the Cincinnati Bengals between 2015 and 2017. Shaw played college football for the USC Trojans.

== Early life ==
Shaw attended Palmdale High School in Palmdale, California. He played cornerback, quarterback, and wide receiver. As a senior, he had 50 tackles and an interception on defense, passed for 2,279 yards with 18 touchdowns as a quarterback, and rushed for 921 yards and 14 rushing touchdowns. He also participated in track. He was rated by Rivals.com as a four-star recruit and was ranked as the third best cornerback in his class. He committed to the University of Florida to play college football.

== College career ==
Shaw attended Florida from 2010 to 2011. He appeared in one game as a true freshman and redshirted. As a redshirt freshman in 2011, he appeared in 10 games with one start and recorded 22 tackles. Prior to the 2012 season, Shaw transferred to the University of Southern California (USC). He was granted a hardship waiver and was eligible to play immediately without sitting out the year. He started his USC career as a strong safety and was moved to cornerback during the middle of the season and became a starter. He appeared in all 13 games with seven starts and had 30 tackles and two interceptions. As a junior in 2013, Shaw started all 14 games at both cornerback and safety. He had 67 tackles, four interceptions, and a touchdown.

Prior to his senior season in August 2014, Shaw was suspended by USC after he lied about how he suffered injuries to both his ankles. He had originally told the team that he injured himself while jumping from the second story of an apartment building to save his nephew who was drowning in a pool. In reality, he suffered the injuries after jumping from his balcony to avoid the police who had been called by a neighbor after hearing an argument between him and his girlfriend. The police looked into possible domestic violence charges; however, no charges were filed due to insufficient evidence. Shaw was reinstated in November 2014 and played in the final three games of the season.

== Professional career ==
=== Pre-draft ===
Shaw received an invitation to the NFL Combine and completed all of the required combine and positional drills. On March 11, 2015, Shaw participated at USC's pro day and performed positional drills. He was ranked the 11th best cornerback in the draft by NFLDraftScout.com and was ranked the 12th best cornerback by NFL analyst Mike Mayock.

Pre-draft measurables
Height	Weight	Arm length	Hand span	40-yard dash	10-yard split	20-yard split	20-yard shuttle	Three-cone drill	Vertical jump	Broad jump	Bench press
6 ft 0 1/2 in (1.84 m)	201 lb (91 kg)	30 3/4 in (0.78 m)	9 in (0.23 m)	4.44 s	1.54 s	2.59 s	4.12 s	7.01 s	37.5 in (0.95 m)	10 ft 10 in (3.30 m)	26 reps
All values are from NFL Combine

=== Cincinnati Bengals ===
On May 2, 2015, the Cincinnati Bengals selected Shaw in the fourth round with the 120th pick of the 2015 NFL draft. He signed with the Bengals on May 18, 2015. Shaw played 15 games in his rookie year with 15 tackles and one pass defended.

During the season opener against the New York Jets on September 11, 2016, Shaw made a game-sealing interception. It was the first interception of his career, leading to a 23–22 victory.

On September 1, 2018, Shaw was placed on injured reserve. He was released on September 6, 2018.

=== Kansas City Chiefs ===
On October 2, 2018, Shaw was signed by the Kansas City Chiefs. He was waived on November 17, 2018 after playing a total of four games for the Chiefs.

=== Tampa Bay Buccaneers ===
On November 20, 2018, Shaw was signed by the Tampa Bay Buccaneers. He played a total of four games for the Buccaneers.

=== Arizona Cardinals ===
On March 18, 2019, Shaw signed a one-year contract with the Arizona Cardinals. He was placed on injured reserve with a shoulder injury on August 25, 2019.

On November 29, 2019, Commissioner Roger Goodell suspended Shaw indefinitely through at least the end of the 2020 season for betting on NFL games. Shaw made a low four-figure bet in Las Vegas on a three-team parlay (including a bet against his Cardinals team) at a sportsbook run by Caesars Entertainment. Some viewed the suspension as hypocritical as the NFL had previously made Caesars Entertainment its first official casino partner earlier in the year.

Shaw filed an appeal of the suspension on December 3 but rescinded it on December 19. As a result, he was moved from injured reserve to the reserve/suspended list. Shaw was eligible to apply for reinstatement on February 15, 2021, and the NFL reinstated him on March 20, 2021 after being suspended for a total of 21 games. Shaw has not played in the NFL since his reinstatement.

=== Birmingham Stallions ===
On March 10, 2022, Shaw was selected by the Birmingham Stallions of the United States Football League. He suffered a quadriceps injury, and was transferred to the inactive roster on April 22, 2022. He was transferred to the active roster on April 30.

== NFL career statistics ==
Legend
**Bold**	Career high

=== Regular season ===
Year	Team	Games		Tackles					Interceptions					Fumbles			
Year	Team	GP	GS	Cmb	Solo	Ast	Sck	TFL	Int	Yds	TD	Lng	PD	FF	FR	Yds	TD
2015	CIN	15	1	23	17	6	0.0	0	0	0	0	0	1	0	0	0	0
2016	CIN	16	12	**56**	**38**	**18**	0.0	0	**1**	0	0	0	**3**	0	0	0	0
2017	CIN	16	1	36	30	6	0.0	**1**	0	0	0	0	**3**	0	0	0	0
2018	KC	4	0	4	3	1	0.0	0	0	0	0	0	0	0	0	0	0
2018	TB	4	0	8	7	1	0.0	**1**	0	0	0	0	0	0	**1**	0	0
		55	14	127	95	32	0.0	2	1	0	0	0	7	0	1	0	0

=== Playoffs ===
Year	Team	Games		Tackles					Interceptions					Fumbles			
Year	Team	GP	GS	Cmb	Solo	Ast	Sck	TFL	Int	Yds	TD	Lng	PD	FF	FR	Yds	TD
2015	CIN	1	0	1	0	1	0.0	0	0	0	0	0	0	0	0	0	0
		1	0	1	0	1	0.0	0	0	0	0	0	0	0	0	0	0
