= Vontaze Burfict =

American football player (born 1990)

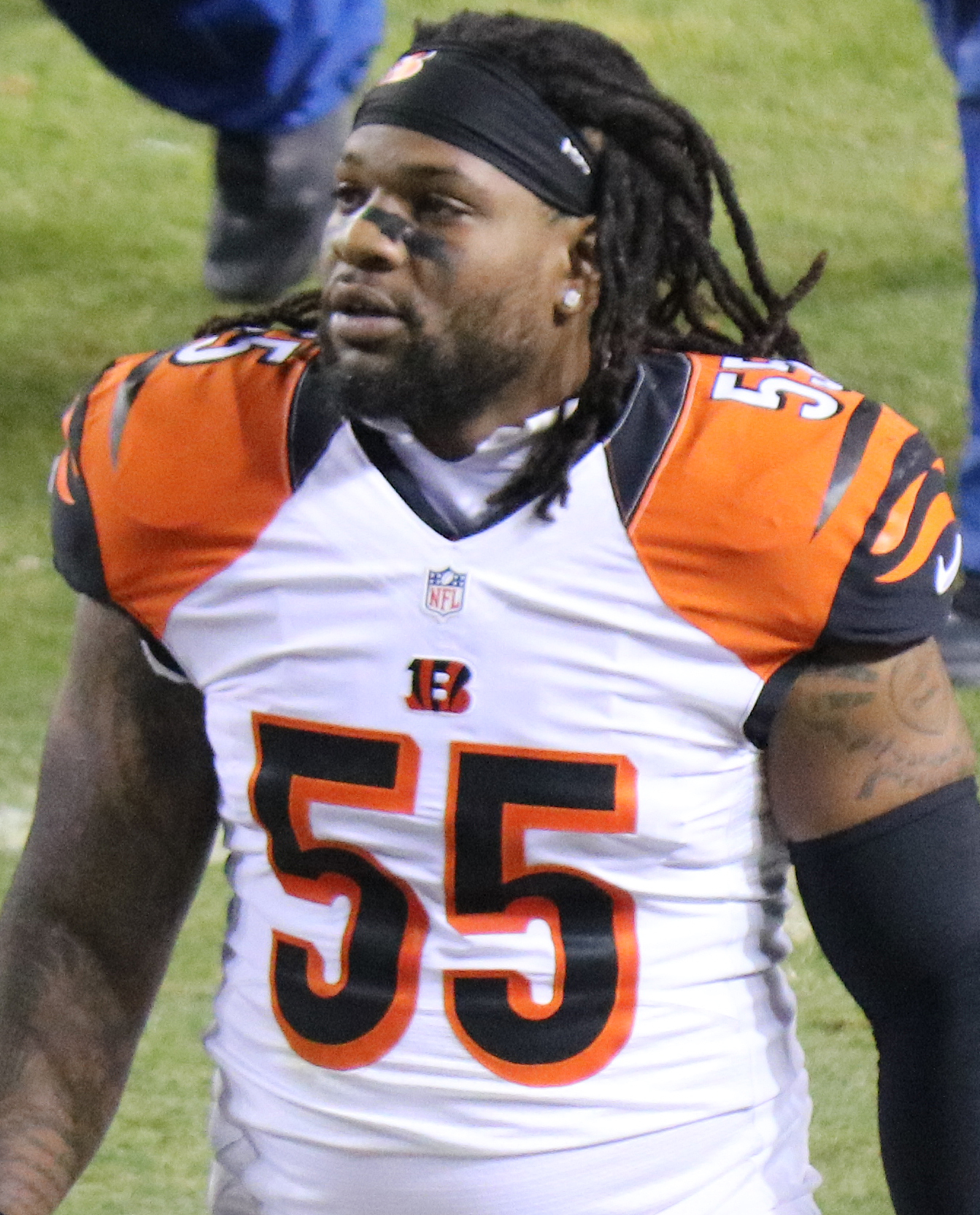
- Burfict with the Cincinnati Bengals in 2015

Current position
- Title: Defensive analyst
- Team: UNLV Rebels
- Conference: MWC

Biographical details
- Born: September 24, 1990 (age 36); Los Angeles, California, U.S.
- Height: 6'1

Playing career
- 2009–2011: Arizona State
- 2012–2018: Cincinnati Bengals
- 2019: Oakland Raiders
- Position: Linebacker

Coaching career (HC unless noted)
- 2025–present: UNLV (Defensive analyst)

Accomplishments and honors

Awards
- Second-team All-Pro (2013); Pro Bowl (2013); NFL combined tackles leader (2013); First-team All-American (2010); Second-team All-Pac-10 (2010); Pac-10 Defensive Freshman of the Year (2009)

Vontaze DeLeon Burfict Jr. (/ˈvɒntɛz ˈbɜːrfɪkt/ VON-tez BUR-fikt; born September 24, 1990) is an American former professional football player who was a linebacker in the National Football League (NFL) for eight seasons, primarily with the Cincinnati Bengals. He played college football for the Arizona State Sun Devils, earning first-team All-American honors in 2010. Burfict was a projected top pick in the 2012 NFL draft until an unimpressive NFL Combine performance and character concerns led to him not being selected. He was signed as an undrafted free agent by the Bengals, where he spent his first seven seasons. In his final season, he was a member of the Oakland Raiders.

Burfict led the Bengals in tackles during his rookie season and earned Pro Bowl honors in 2013. He also incited controversy throughout his career for frequently violating player safety rules, which caused him to be suspended for 22 games due to 15 separate incidents and accumulate more than $5.36 million in fines and forfeited salary, approximately 15.28% of his $35.14 million in career earnings. Burfict's final season with the Raiders was cut short when he was suspended 12 games for an illegal hit, the longest on-field suspension in NFL history. In 2025, Burfict joined the UNLV Rebels as a defensive analyst.

== Early life ==
Burfict attended Centennial High School in Corona, California, where he was part of an undefeated Huskies team that won a California Interscholastic Federation state championship with the help of quarterback Taylor Martinez; the team was ranked second in the nation by USA Today in 2008. That year , Burfict led the Huskies with 159 tackles, two quarterback sacks, two interceptions and two fumble recoveries. Burfict participated in the US Army All-American Bowl and was the third-leading tackler for the West team. He also earned numerous All-American honors, including Parade.

Burfict missed almost all of his sophomore season due to academic problems. As a junior, Burfict collected a team-high 130 tackles and added four sacks, two interceptions, and one fumble recovery. He helped anchor a linebacker unit that included fellow Sun Devils Shelly Lyons and Brandon Magee. Corona Centennial finished the 2007 season as No. 24 on USA Today's Top 25.

He played in the 2009 U.S. Army All-American Bowl. Considered a five-star recruit by Rivals.com and Scout.com, Burfict was listed as the No. 1 inside linebacker prospect in the nation.

Burfict's reputation for hard and often illegal hits dated back to his high school days. In 2019, Burfict's mother told USA Today that a number of parents frequently came up to her and asked her to tell her son not to hit their sons so hard. Burfict's uncle recalled that, at the time, helmet-to-helmet hits were not frowned on as much as they were by the time Burfict made it to the NFL. Burfict's rivalry with quarterback Matt Barkley, which would continue into their college days, began in high school. In a game against Barkley's Mater Dei High School, Burfict made hits aimed at Barkley's knees that Barkley would later describe as dirty. Both Burfict and Barkley were committed to USC when the incident occurred.

College recruiting
Name	Hometown	School	Height	Weight	40^{‡}	Commit date
Vontaze Burfict; LB	Corona, California	Centennial High School (CA)	6 ft 2 in (1.88 m)	245 lb (111 kg)	4.6	Feb 4, 2009
Vontaze Burfict; LB	Recruit ratings: Scout: Rivals: (85)					
Overall recruit ranking: Scout: 1 (MLB) Rivals: 1 (ILB), 2 (CA) ESPN: 1 (LB)
Note: In many cases, Scout, Rivals, 247Sports, On3, and ESPN may conflict in their listings of height and weight.; In these cases, the average was taken. ESPN grades are on a 100-point scale.; Sources: "Arizona State Football Commitments". Rivals.; "2009 Arizona State Football Commits". Scout.; "ESPN". ESPN.; "Scout.com Team Recruiting Rankings". Scout.; "2009 Team Ranking". Rivals.com.

== College career ==
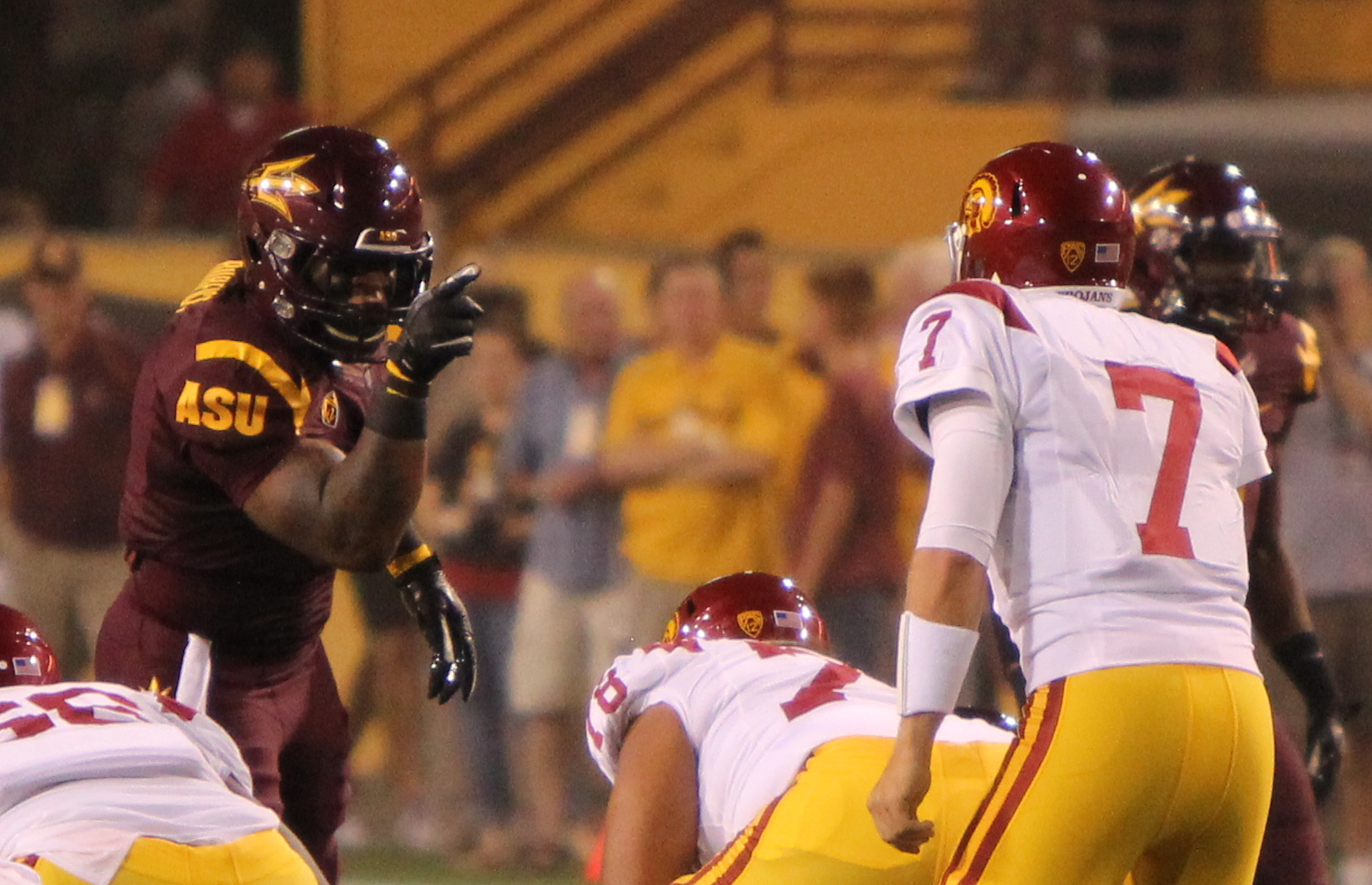
Burfict (left) pointing at USC Trojans quarterback Matt Barkley in 2011. The two had a long-standing rivalry since high school.

Burfict originally committed to USC but eventually switched to Arizona State on National Signing Day. He joined Arizona State's 2009 recruiting class that included three of his high school teammates. By July 2009, he struggled to meet admission standards based on the NCAA eligibility sliding scale and still had one summer school class to complete. Sun Devils coach Dennis Erickson, who compared Burfict to Ray Lewis, expected him to be academically eligible for enrollment. Burfict did qualify on time for the 2009 football season.

By midseason, Burfict ranked second on the team with 30 tackles despite starting only three of six games and had five tackles for a loss, two sacks, and three pass break-ups. ESPN named him Arizona State's midseason defensive MVP. In a road game against Georgia on September 26, Burfict collected a season-high 11 tackles (three solo) and one and a half tackles for loss. He led the Sun Devils in tackles in five games over the course of the season. By the end of the year, he had collected 69 tackles, seven tackles for loss, and a pair of sacks, and was named a Freshman All-American by College Football News, and the Football Writers Association of America. He was also honored as the Pacific-10 Conference Defensive Freshman of the Year.

At the start of his sophomore season, Burfict was named First-Team Preseason All-American by The Sporting News. He was also named to the watchlists of the 2010 Lombardi Award and the Bronko Nagurski Trophy.

On October 6, 2010, Burfict was benched by Arizona State head coach Dennis Erickson. The reason given was Burfict's unusually high number of personal foul penalties. In a game against Stanford, Burfict was called for grabbing the facemask of Doug Baldwin and—after complaining to the referee—charged with a personal foul for unsportsmanlike conduct that gave Stanford a first down at the ASU 7. Two plays later, Stanford scored what turned out to be the winning touchdown.

Burfict finished the 2010 season with a team-leading 90 total tackles, 8.5 tackles for a loss, and two forced fumbles. The Sporting News selected him to their All-American team, as well as Pacific-10 Defensive MVP. Burfict was ASU's first first-team All-American since Terrell Suggs.

With senior cornerback Omar Bolden out for the season with a knee injury, Burfict was expected to take over as the leader of the Sun Devils defense in 2011 but eventually had a rather inconsistent junior season. He would finish the season with 69 total tackles, 7 tackles for a loss and 5 sacks. In his Arizona State career, Burfict recorded 22 personal fouls in 37 games. Burfict decided to forgo his senior year at Arizona State to pursue a career in the NFL.

== Professional career ==
=== Pre-draft ===
Prior to his junior season, Burfict was regarded as one of the best linebackers available in the 2012 NFL draft and was projected to be a first-round pick by most NFL draft experts. His inconsistent play as a junior at Arizona State as well as off-the-field concerns, however, caused his draft stock to plummet. In October 2011, Sports Illustrated's Tony Pauline ranked him as the 20th-best prospect on his midseason draft board, but he noted that he has been "a loose cannon on and off the field, which has raised red flags". Burfict's draft stock would continue to slide with a poor showing at the NFL Scouting Combine, where he performed the majority of drills but skipped the short shuttle and three-cone drills.

External videos
- Vontaze Burfict's NFL Combine Workout

His overall performance at the combine was described as "disappointing" and a "debacle" due to a 5.09-second run of the 40-yard dash, which was the slowest among all linebackers. Burfict also finished last among linebackers in the broad jump and finished second to last among linebackers in the vertical jump. On March 16, 2012, Burfict attended Arizona State's pro day and performed the bench press (16 reps), vertical jump (30"), short shuttle (4.56s), and three-cone drill (7.51s). Burfict described his overall pro day performance as "average". On April 25, 2012, it was reported by Fox Sports insider Jay Glazer that multiple NFL teams had been informed that Burfict had failed his drug test at the NFL Combine. Burfict later stated during an interview with Scout.com that he admitted using marijuana to NFL general managers. At the conclusion of the pre-draft process, Burfict was projected to be a seventh round pick by NFL draft experts and scouts. Burfict was ranked as the ninth-best inside linebacker in the draft by Scouts Inc. and was ranked the tenth-best inside linebacker by DraftScout.com.

Pre-draft measurables
Height	Weight	Arm length	Hand span	Wingspan	40-yard dash	10-yard split	20-yard split	20-yard shuttle	Three-cone drill	Vertical jump	Broad jump	Bench press
6 ft 1 3/8 in (1.86 m)	248 lb (112 kg)	31 1/4 in (0.79 m)	9 3/4 in (0.25 m)	6 ft 4 3/4 in (1.95 m)	5.09 s	1.78 s	2.96 s	4.56 s	7.51 s	30.0 in (0.76 m)	8 ft 8 in (2.64 m)	16 reps
All values from NFL Combine/Arizona State's Pro Day

=== Cincinnati Bengals ===
==== 2012 season ====
Burfict went undrafted in the 2012 NFL draft. On April 29, 2012, the Cincinnati Bengals signed Burfict to a three-year, $1.44 million contract that featured a signing bonus of $1,000.

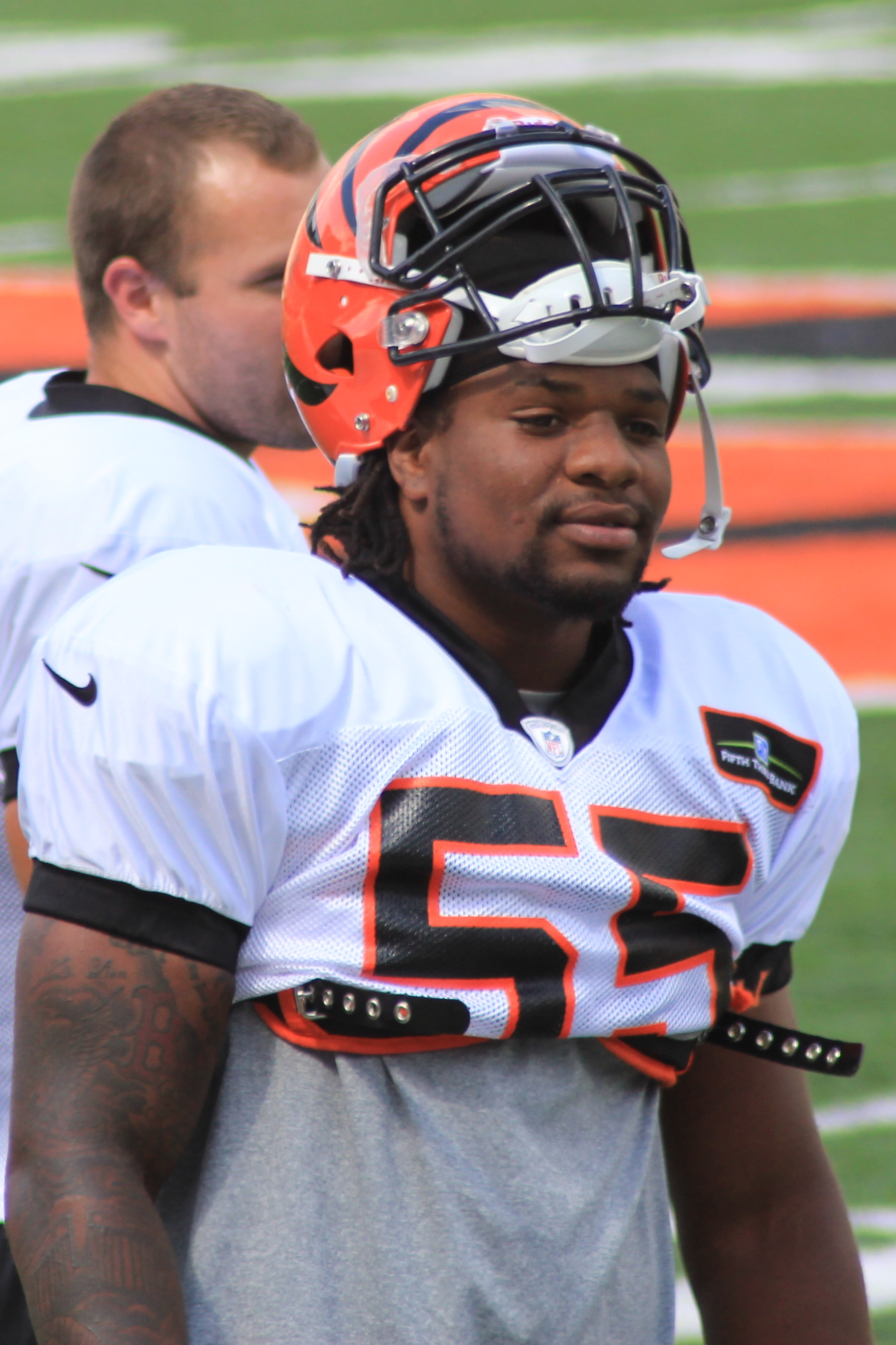
Burfict at Bengals training camp in 2012

Throughout training camp, Burfict competed for a roster spot as a backup middle linebacker against veteran Roddrick Muckelroy. Head coach Marvin Lewis named Burfict the backup middle linebacker, behind Rey Maualuga, to begin the regular season.

He made his professional regular season debut in the Cincinnati Bengals' season-opening 13–44 loss at the Baltimore Ravens. On September 23, 2012, Burfict earned his first career start at weakside linebacker after Thomas Howard was placed on injured reserve after tearing his ACL during practice. He recorded seven combined tackles during the Bengals' 38–31 win at the Washington Redskins in Week 2. In Week 3, Burfict made eight solo tackles, broke up a pass, and made his first career sack during a 27–10 win at the Jacksonville Jaguars. Burfict sacked Jaguars quarterback Blaine Gabbert for an 11-yard loss in the fourth quarter. On December 30, 2012, Burfict collected a season-high 18 combined tackles (ten solo) as the Bengals defeated the Baltimore Ravens 23–17. Burfict finished his rookie season in 2012 with 127 combined tackles (73 solo), two pass deflections, and one sack in 16 games and 14 starts. He led the team in tackles as a rookie and finished 15th among all players in the league. When Burfict was on the field, the Bengals defense allowed 2.4 yards fewer per play, allowing 4.5 compared to 6.9 when he was off the field.

The Cincinnati Bengals finished second in the AFC North with a 10–6 record and earned a Wild Card berth. On January 5, 2013, Burfict started his first career playoff game and recorded six combined tackles during the Bengals' 13–19 loss to the Houston Texans in the AFC Wildcard Game.

==== 2013 season ====
Burfict entered training camp slated as the team's starting weakside linebacker under defensive coordinator Mike Zimmer. Head coach Marvin Lewis named Burfict and James Harrison the team's starting outside linebackers to begin the regular season, along with middle linebacker Rey Maualuga.

He started in the Cincinnati Bengals' season-opener at the Chicago Bears and recorded eight combined tackles, deflected a pass, and made his first career interception during a 21–24 loss. Burfict intercepted a pass by Bears quarterback Jay Cutler, that was originally intended for running back Michael Bush, and returned it for a 12-yard gain during the fourth quarter. For incidents that occurred in the 34–30 win over the Green Bay Packers in Week 3 of the 2013 season, Burfict was fined a total of $31,000. He was fined for a hit on a defenseless receiver (James Jones) and intentionally struck an opponent in the groin (Ryan Taylor). On November 17, 2013, Burfict collected a season-high 15 combined tackles (ten solo), broke up a pass, and returned a fumble recovery for his first career touchdown during a 41–20 win against the Cleveland Browns in Week 11. Burfict forced a fumble by Browns running back Chris Ogbonnaya, recovered the ball, and returned it for a 13-yard touchdown. On December 27, 2013, it was announced that Burfict was selected to play in the 2014 Pro Bowl. He became the first Bengals linebacker to be selected to a Pro Bowl since Jim LeClair in 1976. Burfict started in all 16 games in 2013, recording a career-high 171 combined tackles (114 solo); making six pass deflections, three sacks, one interception, one forced fumble, and one fumble recovery; and scoring one touchdown. Burfict led all players in tackles in 2013 and also topped the NFL's "Performance-Based Pay" program list with $299,465 in earnings that year.

The Cincinnati Bengals finished first in the AFC North with an 11–5 record in 2013 and clinched a wild card spot. During the AFC Wild Card round, Burfict made seven combined tackles and was credited with half a sack as the Bengals lost 10–27 against the San Diego Chargers.

==== 2014 season ====
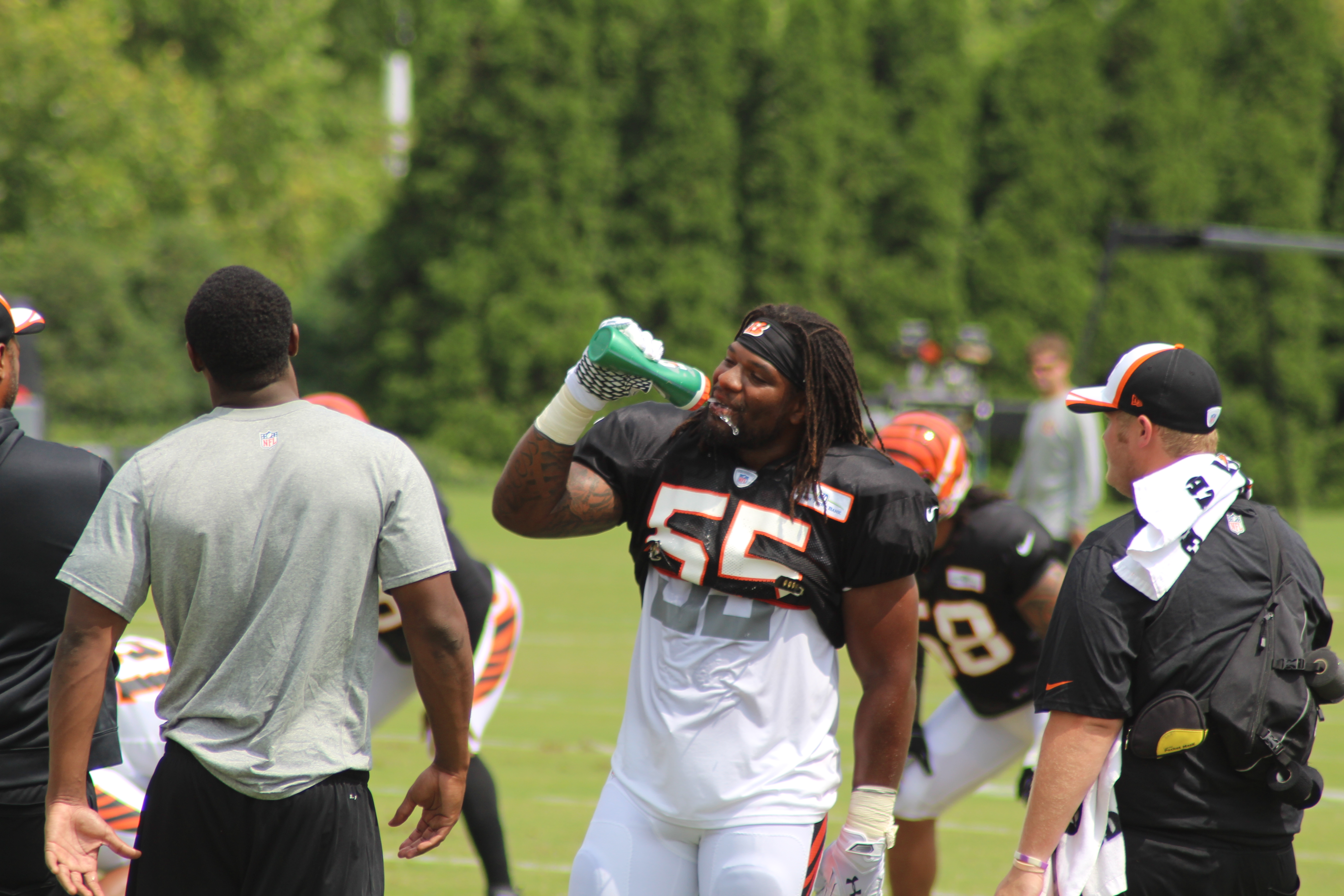
Burfict at 2014 Bengals training camp

On January 15, 2014, the Cincinnati Bengals announced their decision to promote linebackers coach Paul Guenther to defensive coordinator after Mike Zimmer accepted the head coaching position with the Minnesota Vikings.

On August 20, 2014, the Cincinnati Bengals signed Burfict to a four-year, $19 million contract that included $6.90 million guaranteed and a signing bonus of $3.10 million. Head coach Marvin Lewis retained Burfict as the starting linebacker in 2014 alongside Rey Maualuga and Emmanuel Lamur.

Burfict sustained a concussion while sacking quarterback Joe Flacco during the Bengals season-opening 23–16 victory at the Baltimore Ravens. In Week 2, Burfict sustained another concussion during a 24–10 win against the Atlanta Falcons. Burfict remained in concussion protocol due to concussion-related symptoms and remained inactive for the next two games (Weeks 3 and 4). During Week 6 against the Carolina Panthers, Burfict collected a season-high ten combined tackles (seven solo) as the game ended in a 37–37 tie. On October 14, 2014, Panthers tight end Greg Olsen accused Burfict of intentionally trying to injure him and quarterback Cam Newton by twisting their ankles after touchdowns by both. On October 15, 2014, the NFL fined Burfict $25,000 for the ankle twisting incidents involving Olsen and Newton. In Week 8, Burfict recorded seven combined tackles and suffered a knee injury during a 27–24 win against the Baltimore Ravens. On October 29, 2014, it was reported that Burfict had undergone arthroscopic surgery on his knee. He was inactive for the next six games (Weeks 9–14) and was subsequently placed on injured reserve on December 9, 2014. Burfict was limited to five games and five starts in 2014 and recorded 29 combined tackles (15 solo) and two pass deflections.

==== 2015 season ====
On January 26, 2015, it was revealed that Burfict had undergone microfracture surgery after issues in his knee that was surgically repaired the previous October continued to persist. On July 28, 2015, the Cincinnati Bengals placed Burfict on their physically unable to perform list. Burfict remained on the list to begin the 2015 regular season. On October 31, 2015, the Cincinnati Bengals activated Burfict from their PUP list and added him to their active roster. Upon joining the active roster, Burfict was named a starting linebacker along with A. J. Hawk and Rey Maualuga. His penchant for dirty hits and controversy resurfaced the very next day, during the Bengals’ Week 8 matchup with Pittsburgh, when he tackled Steelers’ halfback Le’Veon Bell so violently that he tore Bell's MCL and thereby ended his season.

In Week 14, he collected a season-high 11 solo tackles during a 20–33 loss against the Pittsburgh Steelers. On December 15, 2015, Pittsburgh Steelers quarterback Ben Roethlisberger accused Burfict of having intentionally targeted his ankle in the teams' regular season game on December 13. On December 18, 2015, Burfict received three fines from the NFL that totaled $69,454. He received a fine for his hit on Ben Roethlisberger and received two other fines for unnecessary roughness penalties. In Week 15, Burfict made seven combined tackles, a season-high three pass deflections, and an interception during a 24–14 win at the San Francisco 49ers. On January 1, 2016, Burfict recorded a season-high 12 combined tackles (eight solo), deflected two passes, and made an interception as the Bengals defeated the Baltimore Ravens 24–16. He finished the 2015 NFL season with 74 combined tackles (57 solo), five pass deflections, two interceptions, and one sack in ten games and ten starts.

The Cincinnati Bengals clinched the AFC North with a 12–4 record. During the AFC Wild Card round against the Pittsburgh Steelers in Cincinnati, Burfict recorded six combined tackles, one deflected pass, one interception, and one sack. However, Burfict also committed a critical penalty for unnecessary roughness with 18 seconds left in the fourth quarter when the Bengals were leading Pittsburgh 16–15. His penalty was for a hit he delivered with his shoulder to the head of wide receiver Antonio Brown along with cornerback Chris Lewis-Harris. Brown was considered a defenseless receiver as he was attempting to make a reception and was subsequently knocked unconscious and exited the game with a concussion. Bengals' cornerback Adam Jones subsequently received an unsportsmanlike conduct penalty, which advanced the line of scrimmage 30 yards and allowed the Steelers to kick a go-ahead 35-yard field goal to win the game 18–16.

==== 2016 season ====
On January 11, 2016, the NFL announced their decision to suspend Burfict for the first three games of the 2016 season for repeated violations of player safety rules. Burfict served his three-game suspension (Weeks 1–3) to begin the 2016 NFL season. Upon his return, head coach Marvin Lewis named Burfict the starting linebacker along with Karlos Dansby and Rey Maualuga. On December 4, 2016, Burfict collected a season-high 15 combined tackles (ten solo), made four pass deflections, and intercepted two passes as the Bengals defeated the Philadelphia Eagles 32–14. In Week 15, Burfict recorded nine combined tackles and broke up a pass before exiting in the second quarter of the Bengals' 20–24 loss against the Pittsburgh Steelers due to a concussion. Burfict remained in the league's concussion protocol and was inactive for the last two games (Weeks 16–17) of the regular season. He finished the season with 101 combined tackles (73 solo), eight pass deflections, two interceptions, two sacks, one forced fumble, and one fumble recovery in 11 games and 11 starts.

==== 2017 season ====
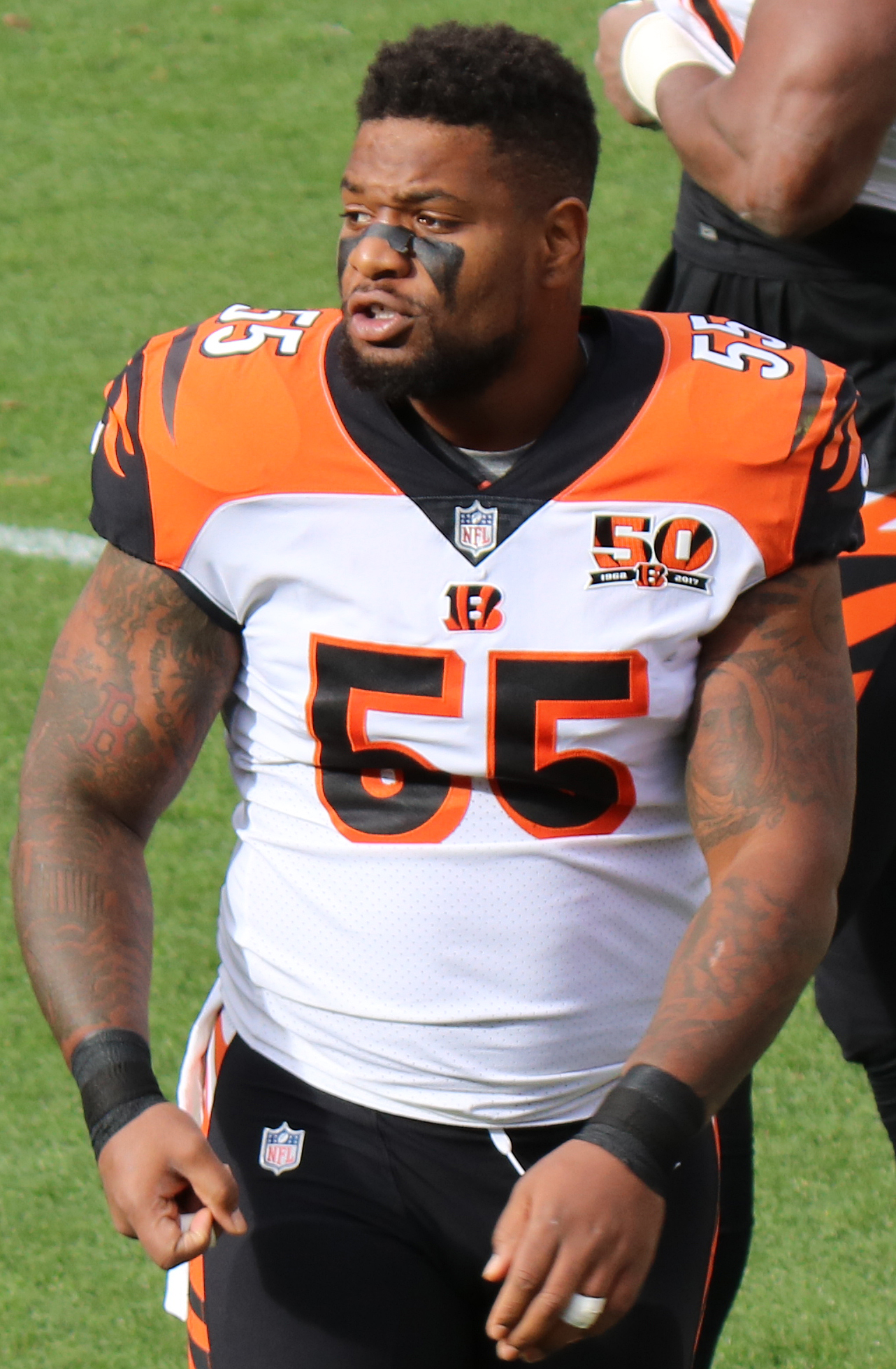
Burfict with the Bengals in 2017

On August 28, 2017, Burfict was suspended for the first five games of the 2017 regular season due to a blindside block he made on Chiefs fullback Anthony Sherman during the second preseason game. Burfict appealed the suspension on August 30, 2017, and the league ultimately reduced the suspension to three games. On September 7, 2017, the Bengals signed Burfict to a three-year, $32.53 million contract extension that included $11.23 million guaranteed and a signing bonus of $3.30 million. The contract would make Burfict one the highest paid linebackers in the NFL.

In Week 5, he collected a season-high 13 combined tackles (ten solo), deflected a pass, and made a sack during a 20–16 win against the Buffalo Bills. On October 22, 2017, Burfict's on the field conduct once again gained attention after he kicked Steelers fullback Roosevelt Nix in the face mask during the Bengals' 14–29 loss at the Pittsburgh Steelers in Week 7. On October 27, 2017, Burfict was fined $12,154 for kicking Nix. During Week 10 against the Tennessee Titans, Burfict was ejected for the first time in his NFL career after he committed two personal foul penalties. The first penalty was a late hit on DeMarco Murray, and the other one was unsportsmanlike conduct for making contact with an official. Burfict left the field by imitating a celebration taunt of quarterback Johnny Manziel. On December 4, 2017, Burfict made six combined tackles during the Bengals' 20–23 loss against the Pittsburgh Steelers in Week 13 before being carted off the field during the fourth quarter. Burfict left the game with a concussion following a blindside block by rookie receiver JuJu Smith-Schuster on Monday Night Football. Smith-Schuster was penalized for unnecessary roughness and taunted Burfict by standing over him after delivering the hit. Burfict remained in concussion protocol and was sidelined for the next two games (Weeks 14–15). He was also inactive for the Bengals' Week 17 victory at the Baltimore Ravens due to a shoulder injury. He finished the 2017 NFL season with 69 combined tackles (48 solo), two pass deflections, 1.5 sacks, and one forced fumble in ten games and ten starts.

==== 2018 season ====
On March 16, 2018, Burfict received a four-game suspension for violating the league's policy against performance-enhancing drugs. Burfict would blame the failed drug test on Smith-Schuster's illegal hit the year prior as well as the fact that he was on prescription drugs.

In Week 6, Burfict delivered a hit to wide receiver Antonio Brown that unintentionally injured Bengals teammate Jessie Bates and sidelined him for the remainder of their 28–21 loss against the Pittsburgh Steelers. On October 20, 2018, Burfict was fined $112,000 for hits in Week 6 on Antonio Brown and James Conner that the league considered unnecessary. Burfict was inactive for two games (Weeks 8–10) due to a hip injury he sustained during a Week 7 loss at the Kansas City Chiefs. On March 18, 2019, Burfict was released by the Bengals after seven seasons with the team.

=== Oakland Raiders ===
On March 19, 2019, Burfict signed a one-year, $5 million contract with the Oakland Raiders. Burfict made his debut with the Raiders in week 1 against the Denver Broncos, making six tackles in the 24–16 win.

During Week 4 against the Indianapolis Colts, Burfict made a helmet-to-helmet hit on Jack Doyle and was ejected from the game. The next day, the NFL suspended Burfict for the rest of the 2019 season without pay. In a letter informing Burfict of the suspension, NFL vice president of football operations and chief disciplinarian officer Jon Runyan issued Burfict a letter of public reprimand for his history of personal fouls and illicit hits against opponents. Runyan added that he and the hearing officers that handle appeals for on-field misconduct had repeatedly warned Burfict about his play, to no avail. The 12-game suspension became the longest for on-field misconduct in modern NFL history, more than doubling the five-game suspension mandated to Albert Haynesworth in 2006. Burfict appealed his suspension, but on October 9, the suspension was upheld. Further investigations revealed that in the same game against the Colts, Burfict made illegal helmet-to-helmet contact against running back Nyheim Hines, although no penalty was called at the time. He was reinstated on December 30, 2019. Burfict became a free agent in 2020 at the conclusion of his one-year contract with the Raiders. He had every intention of continuing his career, but never played another game in the NFL.

== NFL career statistics ==
NFL career statistics for Vontaze Burfict
Year	Team	Games		Tackles				Interceptions						Fumbles	
Year	Team	GP	GS	Comb	Solo	Ast	Sck	PD	Int	Yds	Avg	Lng	TD	FF	FR
2012	CIN	16	14	127	73	54	1.0	2	—	—	—	—	—	—	2
2013	CIN	16	16	171	114	57	3.0	6	1	12	12.0	12	—	1	2
2014	CIN	5	5	29	15	14	—	2	—	—	—	—	—	1	1
2015	CIN	10	10	74	57	17	1.0	5	2	16	8.0	16	—	—	—
2016	CIN	11	11	101	73	28	2.0	8	2	54	27.0	47	—	1	—
2017	CIN	10	10	69	48	21	1.5	2	—	—	—	—	—	1	—
2018	CIN	7	7	33	16	17	—	3	—	—	—	—	—	—	—
2019	OAK	4	4	18	11	7	—	1	—	—	—	—	—	—	—
Total		79	77	622	407	215	8.5	29	5	82	15.7	47	—	4	5

== Coaching career ==
On August 8, 2025, UNLV hired Burfict as a defensive analyst, working alongside Paul Guenther, who was serving as interim defensive coordinator.

== Personal life ==
Burfict was born in South Los Angeles. His father, a gang member and convicted cocaine dealer, was incarcerated most of the time and never had a relationship with his son. His mother, a city transit bus driver, initially raised Burfict and his older half-brother DaShan Miller on her own but eventually remarried and moved to Corona. Like Burfict, Miller was a football player at Corona Centennial High School and later played college football for the UTEP Miners and Akron as a wide receiver.

== Legal issues ==
On December 5, 2020, it was revealed that Burfict was arrested for misdemeanor battery outside of a casino in Las Vegas. He was released from jail the same day on bond. The charges against Burfict were later dropped.

== Legacy ==
Rappers JPEGMafia and Danny Brown have a song named after the football player, titled "Burfict!", on their collaborative album Scaring the Hoes (2023).
