= Ray Gurzynski =

American football player and coach

Biographical details
- Born: July 23, 1915; Catasauqua, Pennsylvania, U.S.
- Died: April 22, 2010 (aged 94); East Norristown Township, Pennsylvania, U.S.

Playing career

Football
- 1935–1938: Ursinus

Coaching career (HC unless noted)

Football
- 1950–1959: Ursinus

Track
- 1947–1981: Ursinus

Head coaching record
- Overall: 26–49–3 (football)

Raymond Victor Gurzynski (July 23, 1915 – April 22, 2010) was a track and field and American football player and coach. He served as the head football coach at Ursinus College in Collegeville, Pennsylvania from 1950 to 1959, compiling a record of 26–49–3.

== Head coaching record ==
| Year | Team | Overall | Conference | Standing | Bowl/playoffs |
|---|---|---|---|---|---|
Ursinus Bears (Independent) (1950–1957)
| 1950 | Ursinus | 2–5–1 | | | |
| 1951 | Ursinus | 3–5 | | | |
| 1952 | Ursinus | 3–5 | | | |
| 1953 | Ursinus | 4–3 | | | |
| 1954 | Ursinus | 4–3–1 | | | |
| 1955 | Ursinus | 3–5 | | | |
| 1956 | Ursinus | 3–4–1 | | | |
| 1957 | Ursinus | 2–5 | | | |
Ursinus Bears (Middle Atlantic Conference) (1958–1959)
| 1958 | Ursinus | 0–8 | 0–8 | 6th (Southern College) | |
| 1959 | Ursinus | 2–6 | 2–5 | 4th (Southern College) | |
| Ursinus: | | 26–49–3 | 2–13 | | |
| Total: | | 26–49–3 | | | |
