= Paul Guenther (American football) =

American football coach (born 1971)

UNLV Rebels
- Title: Associate head coach & defensive coordinator

Personal information
- Born: November 22, 1971 (age 54); Richboro, Pennsylvania, U.S.

Career information
- High school: Council Rock North (Newtown, Bucks County, Pennsylvania)
- College: Ursinus

Career history
- Western Maryland (1994–1995) Assistant coach; Ursinus (1996) Assistant coach; Jacksonville (1997) Defensive coordinator; Ursinus (1997–2000) Head coach; West Texas State (2001) Defensive backs coach; Washington Redskins (2002–2003) Offensive assistant & offensive quality control coach; Cincinnati Bengals (2005) Staff assistant; Cincinnati Bengals (2006) Assistant special teams coach & assistant defensive backs coach; Cincinnati Bengals (2007-2010) Assistant special teams coach & assistant linebackers coach; Cincinnati Bengals (2011) Assistant special teams coach & assistant defensive backs coach; Cincinnati Bengals (2012–2013) Linebackers coach; Cincinnati Bengals (2014–2017) Defensive coordinator; Oakland / Las Vegas Raiders (2018–2020) Defensive coordinator; Minnesota Vikings (2021) Senior defensive assistant; New England Patriots (2022–2023) Senior defensive assistant; Dallas Cowboys (2024) Defensive run game coordinator; UNLV (2025–present) Associate head coach & defensive coordinator

Head coaching record
- Regular season: NCAA: 25–18 (.581)
- Coaching profile at Pro Football Reference

Paul Guenther (born November 22, 1971) is an American football coach who is currently the associate head coach and defensive coordinator at UNLV. He was the defensive coordinator for the Cincinnati Bengals from 2014 to 2017 and the Oakland/Las Vegas Raiders from 2018 to 2020.

== Playing career ==
Guenther played linebacker for the Ursinus Bears from 1990 to 1993 and was the team's most valuable defensive player twice. He set the Centennial Conference record for most career tackles with 355.

== Coaching career ==
=== Ursinus College ===
In 1997, he was named head coach of his alma mater. He was the first Ursinus alumni to coach the school's football team since Ray Gurzynski in 1959 and at the age of 25, was the youngest head football coach at an NCAA college. He compiled a 25–18 record over his four seasons as head coach. Guenther announced his resignation on November 29, 2000, citing he and school president John Strassburger's "different expectations for the program." His .581 winning percentage was the third best in school history.

=== West Texas State ===
After leaving Ursinus, Guenther spent one season as the defensive backs coach at West Texas State.

=== Washington Redskins ===
Guenther was hired by the Washington Redskins as an offensive assistant in 2002. He assisted wide receivers coach Steve Spurrier Jr. and prepared a weekly scouting report on the next opponent's defense.

=== Cincinnati Bengals ===
In 2004, Guenther was hired by the Cincinnati Bengals as an advance scout. He also assisted wide receivers coach Hue Jackson during training camp. He had previously worked with head coach Marvin Lewis in Washington. He was a special teams and defensive assistant from 2006 to 2014, when he was promoted to defensive coordinator after Mike Zimmer left to become head coach of the Minnesota Vikings.

=== Oakland / Las Vegas Raiders ===
In 2018, Guenther was hired by the Oakland Raiders as their defensive coordinator serving under head coach Jon Gruden. On December 13, 2020, Guenther was fired by the Raiders following a 44–27 loss against the Indianapolis Colts.

=== Minnesota Vikings ===
On February 10, 2021, Guenther was hired by the Minnesota Vikings as a senior defensive assistant, reuniting with head coach Mike Zimmer.

=== New England Patriots ===
Guenther was hired by the New England Patriots as a senior defensive assistant.

=== Dallas Cowboys ===
On February 16, 2024, Guenther was hired by the Dallas Cowboys to serve as the team's defensive run game coordinator.

=== UNLV ===
On March 6, 2025, Guenther was hired by UNLV as their associate head coach. He assumed defensive coordinator duties for the 2025 season on an interim basis following Zach Arnett's resignation.

== Head coaching record ==
=== College ===
Year	Team	Overall	Conference	Standing	Bowl/playoffs
Ursinus Bears (Centennial Conference) (1997–2000)
1997	Ursinus	4–6	3–4	5th	
1998	Ursinus	3–7	2–5	T–6th	
1999	Ursinus	10–2	6–1	2nd	L NCAA Division III Second Round
2000	Ursinus	8–3	5–2	3rd	L ECAC South
Ursinus:		25–18	16–12		
Total:		25–18			
