= Chris Lewis-Harris =

American football player (born 1989)

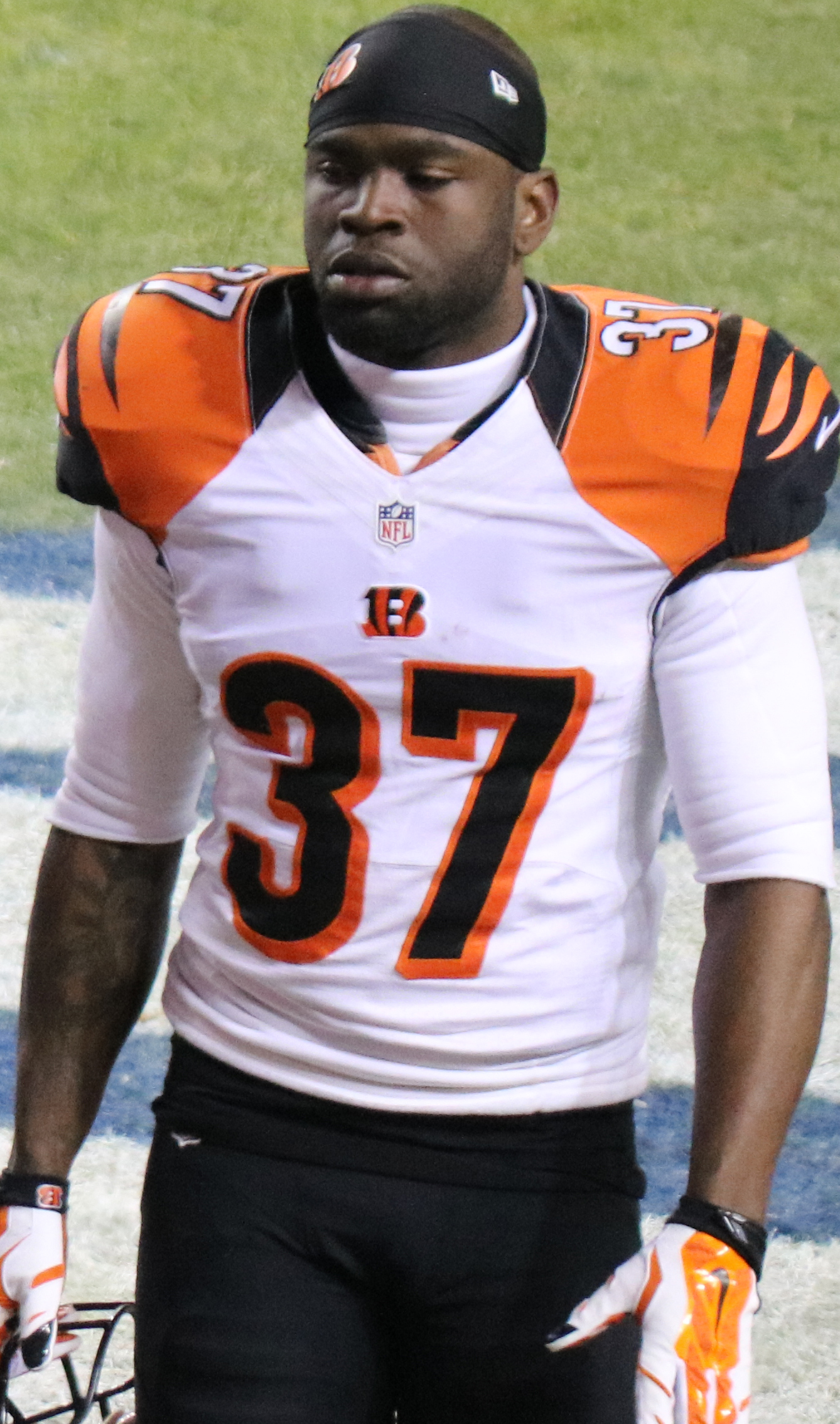
- Lewis-Harris with the Cincinnati Bengals in 2015

No. 37, 31
- Position: Cornerback

Personal information
- Born: February 11, 1989 (age 37); Riverdale, Georgia, U.S.
- Listed height: 6 ft 1 in (1.85 m)
- Listed weight: 198 lb (90 kg)

Career information
- High school: Campbell (Smyrna, Georgia)
- College: Chattanooga
- NFL draft: 2012: undrafted

Career history
- Cincinnati Bengals (2012–2016); Baltimore Ravens (2016); Denver Broncos (2017)*; New York Giants (2018)*
- * Offseason or practice squad member only

Career NFL statistics
- Total tackles: 14
- Pass deflections: 2
- Interceptions: 1
- Stats at Pro Football Reference

Chris Lewis-Harris (born February 11, 1989) is an American former professional football player who was a cornerback in the National Football League (NFL). He played college football for the Chattanooga Mocs and was signed by the Cincinnati Bengals as an undrafted free agent in 2012. He was also a member of the Baltimore Ravens, Denver Broncos, and New York Giants.

== Early life ==
Lewis-Harris attended Campbell High School in Smyrna, Georgia. He was selected to the Associated Press first-team All-State as a defensive back. He was also named for Cobb County Defensive Back of the Year.

== College career ==
Lewis-Harris was an All-conference defensive back while at the University of Tennessee at Chattanooga. He played 44 games and started 38 of them as a cornerback and safety.

== Professional career ==
=== Cincinnati Bengals ===
On July 26, 2012, Lewis-Harris signed with the Cincinnati Bengals as an undrafted free agent. On August 31, 2012, he was released. On September 1, 2012, he was signed to the practice squad. On September 29, he was promoted to the active roster after the team waived tight end Richard Quinn. On October 2, 2012, he was waived after the team re-signed tight end Richard Quinn. On October 4, 2012 he was re-signed to the practice squad. On December 28, 2012, he was promoted to the active roster after the team placed Mike Nugent on Injured reserve due to a calf injury.

On December 5, 2015, Lewis-Harris was waived by the Cincinnati Bengals. On December 8, 2015, the Cincinnati Bengals signed Harris to their practice squad. On December 24, 2015, he was promoted to the active roster.

On November 3, 2016, Lewis-Harris was released by the Bengals.

=== Baltimore Ravens ===
On November 4, 2016, Lewis-Harris was claimed off waivers by the Baltimore Ravens.

=== Denver Broncos ===
On June 14, 2017, Lewis-Harris signed with the Denver Broncos. He was released on September 2, 2017.

=== New York Giants ===
On May 13, 2018, Lewis-Harris signed with the New York Giants. He was released on September 1, 2018.
