= 2012 Pittsburgh Steelers season =

80th season in franchise history

- Steelers 80th Anniversary Logo
- Owner: The Rooney Family
- General manager: Kevin Colbert
- Head coach: Mike Tomlin
- Offensive coordinator: Todd Haley
- Defensive coordinator: Dick LeBeau
- Home stadium: Heinz Field

Results
- Record: 8–8
- Division place: 3rd AFC North
- Playoffs: Did not qualify
- Pro Bowlers: TE Heath Miller; C Maurkice Pouncey
- Team MVP: Heath Miller
- Team ROY: Mike Adams

Uniform
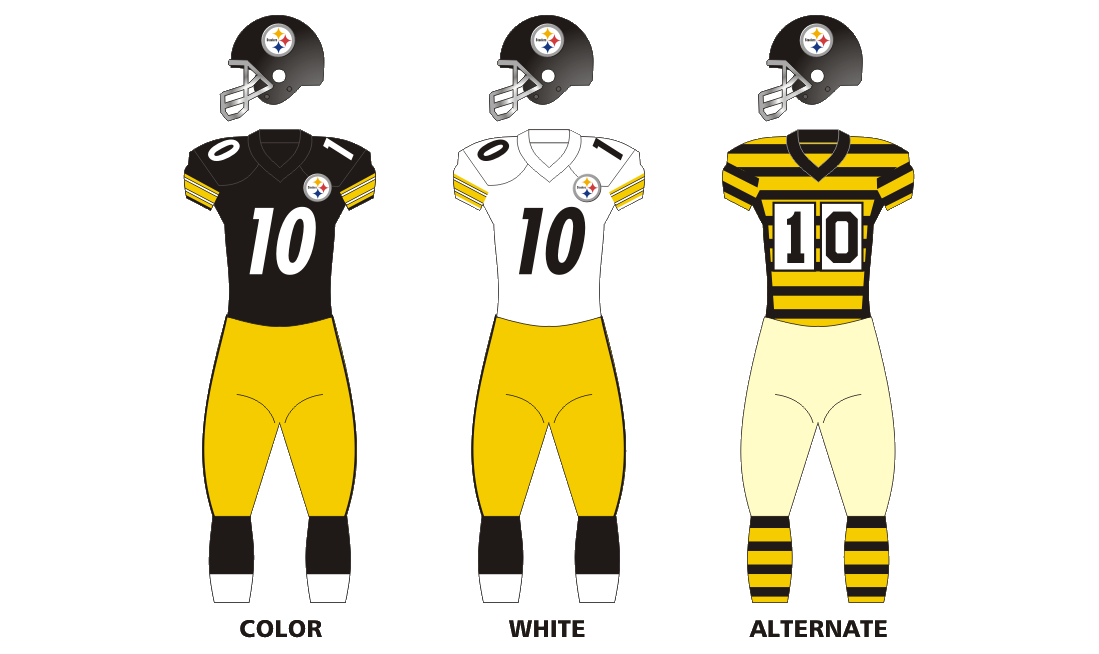

The 2012 season was the Pittsburgh Steelers' 80th in the National Football League (NFL), their 13th under general manager Kevin Colbert and their sixth under head coach Mike Tomlin. They failed to improve on their 12–4 record from 2011 and did not reach the postseason for the first time since 2009. After a 6–3 start, the Steelers lost five of their last seven games and finished the season with a record of 8–8, their first non-winning season since 2006. The 2012 Steelers set a new NFL record for the most games decided on the last play, with 6. For the first time since 1997, Hines Ward was not on the team's roster, as he retired shortly after being released in March 2012.

== Staff ==
2012 Pittsburgh Steelers staff
Front office: Chairman emeritus – Daniel M. Rooney; President – Arthur J. Rooney II; Vice president – Arthur J. Rooney, Jr.; Administration advisor – Chuck Noll; Administrative assistant – Diane Lowe; Business office; Director of business – Mark Hart; Controller – Bob Tyler; Director of football and business administration – Omar Khan; Business administration – Dan Ferens; Assistant controller – Jodie Spagnolli; Payroll/benefits administrator – Kelly Serafin; Administrative assistant – Rebecca Mihalcik; Administrative assistant – Colleen Kimmel; Media relations; Communications coordinator – Burt Lauten; Public relations/media manager – Nathan LoCascio; Public relations assistant – Ryan Scarpino; Community relations; Community relations manager – Michele Rosenthal; Administrative assistant – Stacie Lawrence; Information technology; Technology manager – Scott Phelps; IT/Network Support Technician – Jon Pugliano; Digital media assistant – Scott Graham; Steelers.com/Steelers Digest; Editor – Bob Labriola; Assistant editor/website – Teresa Varley; Photography; Team photographer – Karl Roser; Football operations; general manager – Kevin Colbert; Player personnel coordinator – Dan Rooney, Jr.; College scouting coordinator – Ron Hughes; Pro personnel coordinator – Brandon Hunt; Special assistant/pro and college personnel – Joe Greene; Pro/college scout – Phil Kreidler; College scout – Kelvin Fisher; College scout – Mark Gorscak; College scout – Bruce McNorton; College/pro scout – David Petett; College personnel assistant – Bill Nunn; BLESTO Scout – Mark Bruener; Administrative assistant – Maureen Mannion; Administrative assistant – Karen Mercalde; Player development – Raymond Jackson; Head coaches: Head coach – Mike Tomlin; Assistant head coach/defensive line – John Mitchell; Offensive coaches: Offensive coordinator – Todd Haley; Quarterbacks – Randy Fichtner; Running backs – Kirby Wilson; Wide receivers – Scottie Montgomery; Tight ends – James Daniel; Offensive line – Sean Kugler; Offensive assistant – Shaun Sarrett	Defensive coaches: Defensive coordinator – Dick LeBeau; Linebackers – Keith Butler; Defensive backs – Carnell Lake; Defensive assistant – Jerry Olsavsky; Special teams coaches: Special Teams Coordinator– Al Everest; Assistant special teams – Amos Jones; Strength and conditioning: Conditioning coach – Garrett Giemont; Conditioning assistant – Marcel Pastoor; Player development – Raymond Jackson; Administrative assistant – Chrissy Bulger; Administrative assistant – Mia Daudet; Medical staff; Physician, internal medicine – Dr. Mark Duca; Physician, internal medicine – Dr. Tony Yates; Physician, neurosurgery – Dr. Joseph Maroon; Physician, orthopedic surgery – Dr. James P. Bradley; Athletic training staff; Head athletic trainer – John Norwig; Assistant athletic trainer – Ryan Grove; Assistant athletic trainer – Sonia Gysland; Football equipment staff; Equipment manager - Rodgers Freyvogel; Field manager/assistant equipment manager – Patrick Noone; Video; Video/facilities coordinator – Bob McCartney; Video assistant – Andy Lizanich; Video assistant – Jason McMann

== Roster ==
2012 Pittsburgh Steelers roster
Quarterbacks (QB): 16 Charlie Batch; 4 Byron Leftwich; 7 Ben Roethlisberger; Running backs (RB): 27 Jonathan Dwyer; 46 Will Johnson FB; 34 Rashard Mendenhall; 22 Chris Rainey; 33 Isaac Redman; Wide receivers (WR): 84 Antonio Brown; 80 Plaxico Burress; 89 Jerricho Cotchery; 18 David Gilreath; 88 Emmanuel Sanders; Tight ends (TE): 82 Jamie McCoy; 81 David Paulson; 45 Leonard Pope	Offensive linemen (OL): 68 Kelvin Beachum T; 66 David DeCastro G; 73 Ramon Foster G; 64 Doug Legursky G/C; 62 John Malecki G; 53 Maurkice Pouncey C; 78 Max Starks T; Defensive linemen (DL): 69 Hebron Fangupo NT; 98 Casey Hampton NT; 97 Cameron Heyward DE; 96 Ziggy Hood DE; 99 Brett Keisel DE; 90 Steve McLendon NT; 95 Alameda Ta'amu NT; 65 Al Woods NT	Linebackers (LB): 50 Larry Foote ILB; 92 James Harrison OLB; 91 Brandon Johnson ILB; 40 Marshall McFadden ILB; 57 Adrian Robinson OLB; 55 Stevenson Sylvester ILB; 94 Lawrence Timmons ILB; 56 LaMarr Woodley OLB; 93 Jason Worilds OLB; Defensive backs (DB): 28 Cortez Allen CB; 26 Will Allen SS; 25 Ryan Clark FS; 42 Da'Mon Cromartie-Smith SS; 21 Robert Golden FS; 37 Justin King CB; 23 Keenan Lewis CB; 29 Ryan Mundy FS; 43 Troy Polamalu SS; 35 Josh Victorian CB; Special teams (ST): 9 Drew Butler P; 6 Shaun Suisham K; 60 Greg Warren LS	Practice squad: 72 Justin Cheadle G; 39 Isaiah Green CB; 71 Joe Long T; 39 Walter McFadden CB; 14 Derek Moye WR; 18 Bert Reed WR; Reserve: 76 Mike Adams T (IR); 20 Baron Batch RB (IR); 31 Curtis Brown CB (IR); 54 Chris Carter OLB (IR); 74 Willie Colon T (IR); 77 Marcus Gilbert T (IR); 85 David Johnson TE (IR); 13 Jeremy Kapinos P (IR); 83 Heath Miller TE (IR); 51 Sean Spence ILB (IR); 24 Ike Taylor CB (IR); 30 DeMarcus Van Dyke CB (IR); 17 Mike Wallace WR (IR); Rookies in italics 53 active, 13 reserve, 6 practice squad

== 2012 draft class ==
Round	Selection	Player	Position	College
1	24	David DeCastro	Guard	Stanford
2	56	Mike Adams	Tackle	Ohio State
3	86	Sean Spence	Inside linebacker	Miami (Fl)
4	109^{[a]}	Alameda Ta'amu	Defensive tackle	Washington
5	159	Chris Rainey	Running back	Florida
7	231	Toney Clemons	Wide receiver	Colorado
7	240^{[b]}	David Paulson	Tight end	Oregon
7	246^{[b]}	Terrence Frederick	Cornerback	Texas A&M
7	248^{[b]}	Kelvin Beachum	Tackle	SMU

^{^[a]} Note: Pick from Raiders through the Washington Redskins (The Steelers traded selections 119 and 193 to the Redskins for selection 109).
^{^[b]} Note: All three of these selections are compensatory selections.

== Schedule ==
=== Preseason ===
Week	Date	Opponent	Result	Record	Game site	NFL.com recap
1	August 9	at Philadelphia Eagles	**L** 23–24	0–1	Lincoln Financial Field	Recap
2	August 19	Indianapolis Colts	**W** 26–24	1–1	Heinz Field	Recap
3	August 25	at Buffalo Bills	**W** 38–7	2–1	Ralph Wilson Stadium	Recap
4	August 30	Carolina Panthers	**W** 17–16	3–1	Heinz Field	Recap

=== Regular season ===
Week	Date	Opponent	Result	Record	Game site	NFL.com recap
1	September 9	at Denver Broncos	**L** 19–31	0–1	Sports Authority Field at Mile High	Recap
2	September 16	New York Jets	**W** 27–10	1–1	Heinz Field	Recap
3	September 23	at Oakland Raiders	**L** 31–34	1–2	O.co Coliseum	Recap
4	Bye					
5	October 7	Philadelphia Eagles	**W** 16–14	2–2	Heinz Field	Recap
6	October 11	at Tennessee Titans	**L** 23–26	2–3	LP Field	Recap
7	October 21	at **Cincinnati Bengals**	**W** 24–17	3–3	Paul Brown Stadium	Recap
8	October 28	Washington Redskins	**W** 27–12	4–3	Heinz Field	Recap
9	November 4	at New York Giants	**W** 24–20	5–3	MetLife Stadium	Recap
10	November 12	Kansas City Chiefs	**W** 16–13 (OT)	6–3	Heinz Field	Recap
11	November 18	**Baltimore Ravens**	**L** 10–13	6–4	Heinz Field	Recap
12	November 25	at **Cleveland Browns**	**L** 14–20	6–5	Cleveland Browns Stadium	Recap
13	December 2	at **Baltimore Ravens**	**W** 23–20	7–5	M&T Bank Stadium	Recap
14	December 9	San Diego Chargers	**L** 24–34	7–6	Heinz Field	Recap
15	December 16	at Dallas Cowboys	**L** 24–27 (OT)	7–7	Cowboys Stadium	Recap
16	December 23	**Cincinnati Bengals**	**L** 10–13	7–8	Heinz Field	Recap
17	December 30	**Cleveland Browns**	**W** 24–10	8–8	Heinz Field	Recap

Note: Intra-division opponents are in bold text.

=== Game summaries ===
==== Week 1: at Denver Broncos ====
Week One: Pittsburgh Steelers at Denver Broncos – Game summary

Quarter	1	2	3	4	Total
Steelers	0	10	3	6	**19**
**Broncos**	0	7	7	17	**31**

at Sports Authority Field at Mile High, Denver, Colorado

- Date: September 9
- Game time: 8:20 p.m. EDT/ 6:20 p.m. MDT
- Game weather: 85 °F (29 °C), (Sunny)
- Game attendance: 76,823
- Referee: Gerald Wright
- TV announcers (NBC): Al Michaels, Cris Collinsworth and Michele Tafoya
- Game Book

Game information

**First quarter**

- No scoring plays

**Second quarter**

- PIT – 10:10 Shaun Suisham 21-yard FG. Drive: 10 plays, 35 yards, 4:50. (PIT 3–0)
- DEN – 5:16 Knowshon Moreno 7-yard TD run, Matt Prater kick. Drive: 12 plays, 80 yards, 4:54. (DEN 7–3)
- PIT – 0:28 Heath Miller 4-yard TD pass from Ben Roethlisberger, Shaun Suisham kick. Drive: 14 plays, 79 yards, 4:48. (PIT 10–7)

**Third quarter**

- PIT – 6:05 Shaun Suisham 35-yard FG. Drive: 16 plays, 64 yards, 8:55. (PIT 13–7)
- DEN – 5:29 Demaryius Thomas 71-yard TD pass from Peyton Manning, Matt Prater kick. Drive: 2 plays, 80 yards, 0:36. (DEN 14–13)

**Fourth quarter**

- PIT – 14:11 Mike Wallace 3-yard TD pass from Ben Roethlisberger, two-point pass failed. Drive: 14 plays, 80 yards, 6:18. (PIT 19–14)
- DEN – 9:23 Jacob Tamme 1-yard TD pass from Peyton Manning, Willis McGahee received pass from Peyton Manning for a two-point conversion. Drive: 10 plays, 80 yards, 4:48. (DEN 22–19)
- DEN – 3:00 Matt Prater 26-yard FG. Drive: 12 plays, 55 yards, 5:18. (DEN 25–19)
- DEN – 1:58 Tracy Porter 43-yard interception return for a TD, two-point run failed. **(DEN 31–19)**

**Top passers**

- PIT – Ben Roethlisberger: 22/40, 245 yards, 2 TD, 1 INT
- DEN – Peyton Manning: 19/26, 253 yards, 2 TD

**Top rushers**

- PIT – Jonathan Dwyer: 9 rushes, 43 yards
- DEN – Willis McGahee: 16 rushes, 64 yards

**Top receivers**

- PIT – Antonio Brown: 4 receptions, 74 yards
- DEN – Demaryius Thomas: 5 receptions, 110 yards

**Top tacklers**

- PIT – Larry Foote: 8 tackles, 1 assist, 1 sack
- DEN – Wesley Woodyard: 12 tackles, 1 sack

The Pittsburgh Steelers opened their 2012 season facing the Denver Broncos, the team that had stunned them in the AFC Wildcard Playoffs to end their 2011 season. The game was even more important, as it was former Indianapolis Colts quarterback Peyton Manning's first game with the Broncos, and his first since recovering from neck surgery following the 2010 season. The Steelers were playing their first game with new offensive coordinator Todd Haley, but were missing long-time team leaders Hines Ward and James Farrior. The first quarter of the game featured multiple punts by both teams, as neither offense could establish any consistency in moving the football. The Steelers scored first, scoring on a 21-yard field goal to take a 3–0 lead early in the second quarter. The Broncos would respond by going no-huddle and scoring the game's first touchdown on a 7-yard run by Knowshon Moreno. The Steelers would end the first half scoring on a 4-yard touchdown pass from Ben Roethlisberger to Heath Miller, giving them a 10–7 lead. The Steelers would begin the third quarter by methodically driving the offense down the field and kicking a 35-yard field goal, capping off a drive that kept Manning and the Broncos offense on the sideline for nearly 10-minutes. However, it would only take Manning 36-seconds to put the Broncos back on top 14–13, when a short screen pass to Demaryius Thomas resulted in a 71-yard touchdown. The Steelers would put the first points of the fourth quarter on the board, when Roethlisberger found Mike Wallace for a 3-yard touchdown pass. The Steelers would fail to convert on their 2-point conversion attempt, leading 19–14. The Broncos would once again go no-huddle and score on a 1-yard pass to Jacob Tamme, and also convert a two-point attempt, giving the Broncos back the lead, 22–19. After a 26-yard field goal with only 3-minutes remaining in the game, The Steelers were given one more chance to come back and win. However, a Roethlisberger pass would be intercepted and returned 43-yards for a touchdown, sealing the Broncos win over the Steelers 31–19 as the team began their season 0–1 for the 2nd straight year.

==== Week 2: vs. New York Jets ====
Week Two: New York Jets at Pittsburgh Steelers – Game summary

Quarter	1	2	3	4	Total
Jets	7	3	0	0	**10**
**Steelers**	3	10	7	7	**27**

at Heinz Field, Pittsburgh, Pennsylvania

- Date: September 16
- Game time: 4:25 pm. EDT
- Game weather: 71 °F (22 °C), (Sunny)
- Game attendance: 64,511
- Referee: Jerry Frump
- TV announcers (CBS): Jim Nantz and Phil Simms
- Game Book

Game information

**First quarter**

- Steelers 3–0 – S. Suisham 45 Yard Field Goal (9:07)
- Jets 7–3 – S. Holmes 14 Yard Pass from M. Sanchez (N. Folk Kick) (4:19)

**Second quarter**

- Jets 7–6 – S. Suisham 45 Yard Field Goal (14:56)
- Jets 10–6 – N. Folk 38 Yard Field Goal (9:35)
- Steelers 13–10 – H. Miller 1 Yard Pass from B. Roethlisberger (S. Suisham Kick) (1:03)

**Third quarter**

- Steelers 20–10 – M. Wallace 37 Yard Pass from B. Roethlisberger (S. Suisham Kick) (8:44)

**Fourth quarter**

- Steelers 27–10 – I. Redman 2 Yard Run (S. Suisham Kick) (3:34)

**Top passers**

- NYJ – M. Sanchez (10/27, 138 Yds, 1 TD, 0 INT)
- PIT – B. Roethlisberger (24/31, 275 Yds, 2 TD, 0 INT)

**Top rushers**

- NYJ – B. Powell (9 Car, 33 Yds, 0 TD)
- PIT – J. Dwyer (12 Car, 28 Yds, 0 TD)

**Top receivers**

- NYJ – J. Kerley (2/4, 67 Yds, 0 TD)
- PIT – A. Brown (7/10, 79 Yds, 0 TD)

The Pittsburgh Steelers began week two looking to avoid a 0–2 start to their season. They would move the ball down the field on their opening possession, but could only come away with 3-points. The New York Jets responded by scoring the game's first touchdown, and would lead 7–3 at the end of the first quarter. The Steelers would score off another field goal early in the second quarter and a one-yard pass late in the second quarter to lead 13–10 at halftime. The Steelers would come out after halftime and quickly take control of the game, scoring on a 37-yard touchdown pass from Ben Roethlisberger to Mike Wallace. The Steelers defense dominated the Jets offense, completely shutting down Jets quarterback Mark Sanchez and his receivers. The Steelers would score one more touchdown late in the fourth quarter to give them a 27–10 victory and move them to 1–1 in the standings.

==== Week 3: at Oakland Raiders ====
Week Three: Pittsburgh Steelers at Oakland Raiders – Game summary

Quarter	1	2	3	4	Total
Steelers	14	3	14	0	**31**
**Raiders**	7	7	7	13	**34**

at O.co Coliseum, Oakland, California

- Date: September 23
- Game time: 4:25 pm. EDT/ 1:25 p.m. PDT
- Game weather: 69 °F (21 °C), (Cloudy)
- Game attendance: 62,373
- Referee: David White
- TV announcers (CBS): Ian Eagle and Dan Fouts
- Game Book

Game information

**First quarter**

- Steelers 7–0 – H. Miller 4 Yard Pass from B. Roethlisberger (S. Suisham Kick) (11:33)
- Tied 7–7 – D. McFadden 64 Yard Run (S. Janikowski Kick) (10:33)
- Steelers 14–7 – H. Miller 4 Yard Pass from B. Roethlisberger (S. Suisham Kick) (3:49)

**Second quarter**

- Tied 14–14 – D. Heyward-Bey 3 Yard Pass from C. Palmer (S. Janikowski Kick) (1:54)
- Steelers 17–14 – S. Suisham 33 Yard Field Goal (0:00)

**Third quarter**

- Steelers 24–14 – M. Wallace 22 Yard Pass from B. Roethlisberger (S. Suisham Kick) (11:40)
- Steelers 24–21 – R. Gordon 1 Yard Pass from C. Palmer (S. Janikowski Kick) (6:35)
- Steelers 31–21 – Fumble Recovered by A. Brown in End Zone (S. Suisham Kick) (1:31)

**Fourth quarter**

- Steelers 31–28 – D. Moore 6 Yard Pass from C. Palmer (S. Janikowski Kick) (12:13)
- Tied 31–31 – S. Janikowski 32 Yard Field Goal (6:30)
- Raiders 34–31 – S. Janikowski 43 Yard Field Goal (0:00)

**Top passers**

- PIT – B. Roethlisberger (36/49, 384 yards, 4 TD)
- OAK – C. Palmer (24/34, 209 yards, 3 TD, INT)

**Top rushers**

- PIT – I. Redman (9 Car, 27 yards)
- OAK – D. McFadden (18 Car, 113 yards, TD)

**Top receivers**

- PIT – M. Wallace (8 receptions, 123 yards, TD)
- OAK – D. Myers (4 receptions, 55 yards)

The Pittsburgh Steelers headed to Oakland, CA in week three to take on their long-time rivals. The Steelers would score first on a 4-yard touchdown pass from Ben Roethlisberger to tight end Heath Miller, but the Raiders would respond when running back Darren McFadden would break loose on a run and take it 64-yards for a touchdown. Heath Miller would catch another 4-yard touchdown pass, and the Raiders would once again respond with a 3-yard touchdown pass from Carson Palmer to Darrius Heyward-Bey. The Steelers would kick a 33-yard field goal as time expired in the first half to give them a 17–14 lead. The Steelers would begin the second half by driving down the field and scoring on a 22-yard touchdown pass to Mike Wallace. But the Raiders would yet again respond with a 1-yard touchdown pass to Richard Gordon. The Steelers would again drive down the field easily, but Antonio Brown would fumble the football in the endzone. After review, it was determined that Brown had recovered his own fumble and the Steelers found themselves leading the game 31–21 with 1:31 left in the third quarter. Early in the fourth quarter, Pittsburgh safety Ryan Mundy, playing for the injured Troy Polamalu, committed a helmet-to-helmet hit on Oakland receiver Heyward-Bey. The hit knocked Heyward-Bey unconscious and he was taken to the hospital with a concussion and sprained neck. (Mundy was not flagged for the illegal hit by the replacement referees, but would be fined by the NFL a few days later.) The Steelers secondary issues from the past few years continued, as they could not stop Carson Palmer and the Raiders passing attack. The Raiders would score on a 6-yard touchdown pass and a 32-yard field goal to tie the game at 31. The Steelers had a chance to win the game late in the fourth quarter, but the Raiders defense held them to a 3-and-out and forced them to punt the ball back. Palmer would again exploit Pittsburgh's suspect secondary and kicker Janikowski would kick a 43-yard field goal as time expired to give the Raiders a 34–31 victory over the Steelers, their first of the season. The Steelers would head into their bye-week 1–2, and eventually ended up being the only AFC North team to lose to the Raiders.

==== Week 5: vs. Philadelphia Eagles ====
Week Five: Philadelphia Eagles at Pittsburgh Steelers – Game summary

Quarter	1	2	3	4	Total
Eagles	0	0	7	7	**14**
**Steelers**	0	10	0	6	**16**

at Heinz Field, Pittsburgh, Pennsylvania

- Date: October 7
- Game time: 1:00 pm. EDT
- Game weather: 48 °F (9 °C), (Light Rain)
- Game attendance: 64,737
- Referee: Tony Corrente
- TV announcers (Fox): Joe Buck, Troy Aikman and Pam Oliver
- Game Book

Game information

**First quarter**

- No scoring plays

**Second quarter**

- Steelers 7–0 – R. Mendenhall 13 Yard Pass from B. Roethlisberger (S. Suisham Kick) (5:01)
- Steelers 10–0 – S. Suisham 20 Yard Field Goal (0:06)

**Third quarter**

- Steelers 10–7 – L. McCoy 15 Yard Pass from M. Vick (A. Henery Kick) (6:32)

**Fourth quarter**

- Steelers 13–7 – S. Suisham 34 Yard Field Goal (14:51)
- Eagles 14–13 – B. Celek 2 Yard Pass from M. Vick (A. Henery Kick) (6:33)
- Steelers 16–14 – S. Suisham 34 Yard Field Goal (0:00)

**Top passers**

- PHI – M. Vick (20/30, 175 yards, 2 TD)
- PIT – B. Roethlisberger (22/38, 220 yards, TD)

**Top rushers**

- PHI – L. McCoy (16 Car, 53 yards)
- PIT – R. Mendenhall (13 Car, 68 yards)

**Top receivers**

- PHI – D. Jackson (4 receptions, 58 yards)
- PIT – A. Brown (7 receptions, 86 yards)

After a scoreless first quarter, the Steelers drew first blood as Ben Roethlisberger connected with Rashard Mendenhall for a 13-yard catch for a TD to take a 7–0 lead. With 0:06 left in the first half, the Steelers increased their lead to 10–0 with a 20-yard field goal from Shaun Suisham going into halftime. In the 3rd quarter, the Eagles responded with Michael Vick's TD pass to WR LeSean McCoy to shorten the lead 10–7 for the only score of that quarter. The Steelers responded in the 4th quarter with Shaun Suisham kicking a 34-yard field goal to make the score 13–7. The Eagles however took the lead with Vick hooking up with Brent Celek for a 2-yard TD pass as the Eagles moved ahead 14–13. However, the Steelers were able to move down the field in the final seconds and capitalize their victory with another 34-yard field goal from Shaun Suisham as they went on to win the game 16–14.

With the win, the Steelers improved to 2–2. They would also increase their record at home to 2–0.

==== Week 6: at Tennessee Titans ====
Week Six: Pittsburgh Steelers at Tennessee Titans – Game summary

Quarter	1	2	3	4	Total
Steelers	10	0	3	10	**23**
**Titans**	6	10	0	10	**26**

at LP Field, Nashville, Tennessee

- Date: October 11
- Game time: 8:20 pm. EDT
- Game weather: 64 °F (18 °C), (Clear)
- Game attendance: 69,143
- Referee: Ed Hochuli
- TV announcers (NFLN): Brad Nessler, Mike Mayock and Alex Flanagan
- Game Book

Game information

**First quarter**

- Titans 3–0 – R. Bironas 22 Yard Field Goal (10:53)
- Tied 3–3 – S. Suisham 29 Yard Field Goal (7:24)
- Steelers 10–3 – M. Wallace 82 Yard Pass from B. Roethlisberger (S. Suisham Kick) (5:25)
- Steelers 10–6 – R. Bironas 38 Yard Field Goal (1:11)

**Second quarter**

- Titans 13–10 – J. Harper 1 Yard Run (R. Bironas Kick) (14:20)
- Titans 16–10 – R. Bironas 47 Yard Field Goal (0:04)

**Third quarter**

- Titans 16–13 – S. Suisham 28 Yard Field Goal (9:08)

**Fourth quarter**

- Steelers 20–16 – B. Batch 1 Yard Run (S. Suisham Kick) (13:39)
- Steelers 23–16 – S. Suisham 52 Yard Field Goal (8:18)
- Tied 23–23 – K. Britt 5 Yard Pass from M. Hasselbeck (R. Bironas Kick) (4:19)
- Titans 26–23 – R. Bironas 40 Yard Field Goal (0:00)

**Top passers**

- PIT – B. Roethlisberger (24/40, 363 Yds, TD, INT)
- TEN – M. Hasselbeck (25/44, 290 Yds, TD, INT)

**Top rushers**

- PIT – B. Batch (10 Car, 22 Yds, TD)
- TEN – C. Johnson (19 Car, 91 Yds)

**Top receivers**

- PIT – I. Redman (4 receptions, 105 Yds)
- TEN – K. Wright (6 receptions, 71 Yds)

Still hungry for their first road win of the season, the Steelers traveled to LP Field to take on longtime and former divisional rivals the Tennessee Titans. Scoring began early in the first quarter as the Titans took a 3–0 lead after Rob Bironas's 22-yard field goal. The Steelers responded with Suisham's 29-yard field goal to tie the game 3–3. The Steelers took the lead after Roethlisberger connected with Mike Wallace for an 82-yard touchdown pass to take a 10–3 lead. The Titans drew closer with Bironas's 38-yard field goal to shorten the lead 10–6. In the 2nd quarter, the Titans retook the lead with Jamie Harper's 1-yard touchdown run to make the score 13–10. They would increase their lead with yet another Bironas field goal from 47 yards out to increase their lead 16–10 at halftime. The Steelers moved down the field in spite of a 28-yard field goal to make the score 16–13 for the only score of the 3rd quarter. In the fourth quarter, the Steelers retook the lead with Baron Batch's 1-yard TD run to make the score 20–16 and then increased their lead with Suisham's 52-yard field goal for a 23–16 lead. After thinking all was lost, the Titans drove down the field for a comeback attempt. Matt Hasselbeck threw a 5-yard touchdown pass to Kenny Britt to tie the game at 23–23. After Suisham missed a game-winning 54-yard field goal, the Titans again drove down the field and ended the game with Bironas's 40-yard field goal to make the final score 26–23. The loss to the Titans was the first for the Steelers since their 31–14 loss against them in 2008 which was also in Tennessee. The Steelers fell back under .500 and sat at 2–3 and 3rd place in the AFC North while sitting at 0–3 in road games during this point of the season.

==== Week 7: at Cincinnati Bengals ====
Week Seven: Pittsburgh Steelers at Cincinnati Bengals – Game summary

Quarter	1	2	3	4	Total
**Steelers**	3	11	3	7	**24**
Bengals	7	7	3	0	**17**

at Paul Brown Stadium, Cincinnati, Ohio

- Date: October 21
- Game time: 8:20 pm. EDT
- Game weather: 55 °F (13 °C), (Clear)
- Game attendance: 63,411
- Referee: Clete Blakeman
- TV announcers (NBC): Al Michaels, Cris Collinsworth and Michele Tafoya
- Game Book

Game information

**First quarter**

- Steelers 3–0 – S. Suisham 42 Yard Field Goal (10:26)
- Bengals 7–3 – C. Peerman 5 Yard Run (M. Nugent Kick) (2:17)

**Second quarter**

- Bengals 14–3 – A. Green 8 Yard Pass from A. Dalton (M. Nugent Kick) (8:29)
- Bengals 14–6 – S. Suisham 47 Yard Field Goal (3:07)
- Tied 14–14 – H. Miller 9 Yard Pass from B. Roethlisberger (Pass Complete) (0:24)

**Third quarter**

- Bengals 17–14 – M. Nugent 48 Yard Field Goal (11:09)
- Tied 17–17 – S. Suisham 42 Yard Field Goal (8:17)

**Fourth quarter**

- Steelers 24–17 – C. Rainey 11 Yard Run (S. Suisham Kick) (14:16)

**Top passers**

- PIT – B. Roethlisberger (27/37, 278 yards, TD, INT)
- CIN – A. Dalton (14/28, 105 yards, TD, INT)

**Top rushers**

- PIT – J. Dwyer (17 Car, 122 yards)
- CIN – B. Green-Ellis (18 Car, 69 yards, TD)

**Top receivers**

- PIT – A. Brown (7 receptions, 96 yards)
- CIN – R. Whalen (4 receptions, 31 yards)

Looking for their first road win of the season the Steelers traveled to Paul Brown Stadium to take on their division rivals Bengals. In the first quarter, the Steelers would score first with Shaun Suisham kicking a 42-yard field goal to make it 3–0. The Bengals responded with Cedric Peerman's 5-yard run for a TD to make it 7–3 as the Bengals took the lead. In the second quarter, the Bengals increased their lead as Andy Dalton connected with A. J. Green on an 8-yard TD pass to make it 14–3. The Steelers responded with a 47-yard field goal from Suisham to make the score 14–6. After an interception from Andy Dalton, the Steelers moved down the field as Ben Roethlisberger connected with Heath Miller for a TD pass with the 2-point conversion successful, the score was tied 14–14 at halftime. After the break, the Bengals score first in the 3rd quarter after Mike Nugent kicked a 48-yard field goal for them to take the lead 17–14. The Steelers however tied the game back up with Suisham kicking a 47-yard field goal. In the fourth quarter, the Steelers would retake the lead with RB Chris Rainey running into the end zone for an 11-yard TD to move ahead 24–17. After consecutive 3 and outs by the Bengals, the Steelers would run the clock out after the 2-minute warning giving them the victory.

With their 5th straight win over the Bengals, the Steelers improved to 3–3 and have yet to be above .500 for the season. Also, the team improved to 1–3 in road games and 11–2 at Paul Brown Stadium.

==== Week 8: vs. Washington Redskins ====
Week Eight: Washington Redskins at Pittsburgh Steelers – Game summary

Quarter	1	2	3	4	Total
Redskins	0	6	3	3	**12**
**Steelers**	10	10	7	0	**27**

at Heinz Field, Pittsburgh, Pennsylvania

- Date: October 28
- Game time: 1:00 pm. EDT
- Game weather: 44 °F (7 °C), (Light Rain)
- Game attendance: 62,371
- Referee: Pete Morelli
- TV announcers (Fox): Sam Rosen, Brian Billick and Laura Okmin
- Game Book

Game information

**First quarter** Steelers 7–0 – L. Pope 1 Yard Pass from B. Roethlisberger (S. Suisham Kick) (7:55)

Steelers 10–0 – S. Suisham 48 Yard Field Goal (2:49) **Second quarter** Steelers 10–6 – S. Moss 2 Yard Pass from R. Griffin (K. Forbath Kick Blocked) (11:33)

Steelers 17–6 – H. Miller 7 Yard Pass from B. Roethlisberger (S. Suisham Kick) (6:17)

Steelers 20–6 – S. Suisham 27 Yard Field Goal (1:56) **Third quarter** Steelers 20–9 – K. Forbath 48 Yard Field Goal (11:52)

Steelers 27–9 – W. Johnson 1 Yard Pass from B. Roethlisberger (S. Suisham Kick) (5:13) **Fourth quarter** Steelers 27–12 – K. Forbath 45 Yard Field Goal (12:06)

**Top passers**

- WAS – R. Griffin (16/34, 177 Yds, 1 TD)
- PIT – B. Roethlisberger (24/33, 222 Yds, 3 TD)

**Top rushers**

- WAS – A. Morris (13 Car, 59 Yds, 0 TD)
- PIT – J. Dwyer (17 Car, 107 Yds, 0 TD)

**Top receivers**

- WAS – J. Morgan (5/8, 46 Yds, 0 TD)
- PIT – M. Wallace (7/9, 62 Yds, 0 TD)

The Steelers returned home to take on the Redskins. Scoring began early in the game as the Steelers would score on Roethlisberger's 1-yard pass to Leonard Pope to take a 7–0 lead. Shaun Suisham then kicked a 48-yard field goal to make it 10–0. In the 2nd quarter, the Redskins got on the board as RG3 found Santana Moss for a 2-yard TD pass (with a blocked PAT) and the score was left at 10–6. The Steelers did not hesitate, however, as they pushed ahead by double digits as Ben Roethlisberger connected with Heath Miller for a 7-yard pass to make the score 17–6. Suisham increased their lead with a 27-yard field goal as the team lead 20–6 at halftime. Coming into the 3rd quarter, the Redskins scored first with a 48-yard field goal from Kai Forbath to make the score 20–9. However, the Steelers responded with Roethlisberger connecting with Will Johnson for a 1-Yard TD pass to make the score 27–9. In the fourth quarter, the Redskins tried to rally a comeback as Forbath kicked a 45-yard field goal to make the score 27–12. They would then be kept from scoring any more points for the remainder of the game by the Steelers' defense.

With the win, the Steelers improved to over .500 and outright second place in the AFC North at 4–3 and also 3–0 during home games.

==== Week 9: at New York Giants ====
Week Nine: Pittsburgh Steelers at New York Giants – Game summary

Quarter	1	2	3	4	Total
**Steelers**	0	10	0	14	**24**
Giants	0	14	6	0	**20**

at MetLife Stadium, East Rutherford, New Jersey

- Date: November 4
- Game time: 4:25 pm. EST
- Game weather: 44 °F (7 °C), (Mostly Clear)
- Game attendance: 80,991
- Referee: Bill Leavy
- TV announcers (CBS): Jim Nantz and Phil Simms
- Game Book

Game information

**First quarter**

- No scoring plays

**Second quarter** Steelers 7–0 – E. Sanders 4 Yard Pass from B. Roethlisberger (S. Suisham Kick) (12:09)

Tied 7–7 – A. Brown 1 Yard Run (L. Tynes Kick) (7:01)

Giants 14–7 – M. Boley 70 Yard Fumble Return (L. Tynes Kick) (5:11)

Giants 14–10 – S. Suisham 99 Yard Field Goal (0:00) **Third quarter** Giants 17–10 – L. Tynes 50 Yard Field Goal (8:25)

Giants 20–10 – L. Tynes 23 Yard Field Goal (1:32) **Fourth quarter** Giants 20–17 – M. Wallace 51 Yard Pass from B. Roethlisberger (S. Suisham Kick) (14:05)

Steelers 24–20 – I. Redman 2 Yard Run (S. Suisham Kick) (4:02)

**Top passers**

- PIT – B. Roethlisberger (21/30, 216 Yds, 2 TD, 1 INT)
- NYG – E. Manning (10/24, 125 Yds, 0 TD, 1 INT)

**Top rushers**

- PIT – I. Redman (26 Car, 147 Yds, 1 TD)
- NYG – A. Bradshaw (15 Car, 48 Yds, 0 TD)

**Top receivers**

- PIT – M. Wallace (3/5, 66 Yds, 1 TD)
- NYG – V. Cruz (5/11, 67 Yds, 0 TD)

Due to Hurricane Sandy's aftermath, the Steelers flew to New Jersey on game day because the team was unable to find a hotel in New York.

After a scoreless first quarter punt fest, the Steelers drew first blood with Ben Roethlisberger's 4-yard TD pass to Emmanuel Sanders for a 7–0 lead. The Giants however responded to tie the game with RB Andre Brown's 1-Yard Run to make it 7–7. After recovering a fumble, the Giants would take the lead as Michael Boley returned it 70 yards for a TD to move ahead 14–7. The Steelers would shorten the lead to 4 with Shaun Suisham's 30-yard field goal to make the score 14–10 at halftime.

After the break, the Giants would increase their lead from 7 to 10 points with 2 Lawrence Tynes field goals from 50 and 23 yards out making the score at first 17–10 then 20–10. However, the Steelers responded in the 4th quarter with Roethlisberger finding Mike Wallace for a 51-yard catch and run pass to shorten the Giants' lead to 3 making it 20–17. After pressuring Eli and the Giants' offense, the Steelers then drove down the field and took the lead with Redman's 2-Yard Run to make it 24–20. Getting the ball back after the Giants' last 3 and out, Roethlisberger took a knee to end the game as the team improved to 5–3, snapping the Giants' 4-game winning streak. Also, the Steelers would improve to 2–3 in road games and 3–0 against the NFC East.

==== Week 10: vs. Kansas City Chiefs ====
Week Ten: Kansas City Chiefs at Pittsburgh Steelers – Game summary

Quarter	1	2	3	4	OT	Total
Chiefs	7	3	0	3	0	**13**
**Steelers**	0	10	0	3	3	**16**

at Heinz Field, Pittsburgh, Pennsylvania

- Date: November 12
- Game time: 8:30 pm. EST
- Game weather: 43 °F (6 °C), (Light Rain)
- Game attendance: 57,644
- Referee: Carl Cheffers
- TV announcers (ESPN): Mike Tirico, Jon Gruden and Lisa Salters
- Game Book

Game information

**First quarter**

- KC – J. Charles 12 Yard Run (R. Succop Kick), 8:37 (KC 7–0)

**Second quarter**

- KC – R. Succop 22 Yard Field Goal, 14:20 (KC 10–0)
- KC – S. Suisham 35 Yard Field Goal, 9:02 (KC 10–3)
- PIT – M. Wallace 7 Yard Pass from B. Roethlisberger (S. Suisham Kick), 3:16 (Tied 10–10)

**Third quarter**

- No scoring plays

**Fourth quarter**

- PIT – S. Suisham 31 Yard Field Goal, 12:37 (PIT 13–10)
- KC – R. Succop 46 Yard Field Goal, 0:00 (Tied 13–13)

**Overtime**

- PIT – S. Suisham 23 Yard Field Goal, 14:05 (PIT 16–13)

**Top passers**

- KC – M. Cassel (11/26, 154 Yds, 0 TD, 1 INT)
- PIT – B. Roethlisberger (9/18, 84 Yds, 1 TD, 0 INT)

**Top rushers**

- KC – J. Charles (23 Car, 100 Yds, 1 TD)
- PIT – J. Dwyer (19 Car, 56 Yds, 0 TD)

**Top receivers**

- KC – T. Moeaki (3/6, 68 Yds, 0 TD)
- PIT – H. Miller (4/4, 47 Yds, 0 TD)

After a tough road win over the Giants, the Steelers returned home for a game against the Chiefs. With the win, the Steelers improved to 6–3 and also 4–0 in home games and 1–2 against the AFC West. However, Roethlisberger would be knocked out of the game in the 3rd quarter with a shoulder injury and was reported to be out for following week's home game against the AFC North-leading Baltimore Ravens.

==== Week 11: vs. Baltimore Ravens ====
Week Eleven: Baltimore Ravens at Pittsburgh Steelers – Game summary

Quarter	1	2	3	4	Total
**Ravens**	10	0	3	0	**13**
Steelers	7	0	3	0	**10**

at Heinz Field, Pittsburgh, Pennsylvania

- Date: November 18
- Game time: 8:20 pm. EST
- Game weather: 44 °F (7 °C), (Clear)
- Game attendance: 63,446
- Referee: Walt Anderson
- TV announcers (NBC): Al Michaels, Cris Collinsworth and Michele Tafoya
- Game Book

Game information

**First quarter** Steelers 7–0 – B. Leftwich 31 Yard Run (S. Suisham Kick) (14:17)

Steelers 7–3 – J. Tucker 26 Yard Field Goal (8:22)

Ravens 10–7 – J. Jones 63 Yard Punt Return (J. Tucker Kick) (3:16) **Second quarter**

- No scoring plays

**Third quarter** Ravens 13–7 – J. Tucker 39 Yard Field Goal (6:49)

Ravens 13–10 – S. Suisham 22 Yard Field Goal (0:34) **Fourth quarter**

- No scoring plays

**Top passers**

- BAL – J. Flacco (20/32, 164 Yds, 0 TD, 0 INT)
- PIT – B. Leftwich (18/39, 199 Yds, 0 TD, 1 INT)

**Top rushers**

- BAL – R. Rice (20 Car, 40 Yds, 0 TD)
- PIT – J. Dwyer (12 Car, 55 Yds, 0 TD)

**Top receivers**

- BAL – A. Boldin (8/12, 79 Yds, 0 TD)
- PIT – E. Sanders (3/8, 82 Yds, 0 TD)

With their 3rd straight loss to the Ravens, the Steelers dropped to 6–4 and 2 games behind them in the AFC North. They are also now 1–1 in division games and 4–1 at home.

==== Week 12: at Cleveland Browns ====
Week Twelve: Pittsburgh Steelers at Cleveland Browns – Game summary

Quarter	1	2	3	4	Total
Steelers	7	7	0	0	**14**
**Browns**	3	10	7	0	**20**

at Cleveland Browns Stadium, Cleveland, Ohio

- Date: November 25
- Game time: 1:00 pm. EST
- Game weather: 34 °F (1 °C), (Sunny)
- Game attendance: 69,661
- Referee: Ron Winter
- TV announcers (CBS): Kevin Harlan and Solomon Wilcots
- Game Book

Game information

**First quarter**

- PIT – L. Timmons 53 Yard Interception Return (S. Suisham Kick), 13:49 (PIT 7–0)
- CLE – P. Dawson 28 Yard Field Goal, 8:25 (PIT 7–3)

**Second quarter**

- CLE – J. Cameron 5 Yard Pass from B. Weeden (P. Dawson Kick), 2:20 (CLE 10–7)
- CLE – P. Dawson 32 Yard Field Goal, 3:26 (CLE 13–7)
- PIT – C. Rainey 1 Yard Run (S. Suisham Kick), 0:01 (PIT 14–13)

**Third quarter**

- CLE – T. Richardson 15 Yard Run (P. Dawson Kick), 5:19 (CLE 20–13)

**Fourth quarter**

- No scoring plays

**Top passers**

- PIT – C. Batch (20/34, 199 Yds, 0 TD, 3 INT)
- CLE – B. Weeden (17/26, 158 Yds, 1 TD, 1 INT)

**Top rushers**

- PIT – J. Dwyer (9 Car, 19 Yds, 0 TD)
- CLE – T. Richardson (29 Car, 85 Yds, 1 TD)

**Top receivers**

- PIT – E. Sanders (5/6, 63 Yds, 0 TD)
- CLE – J. Gordon (4/7, 60 Yds, 0 TD)

By losing their first game to the Cleveland Browns in three years, the Steelers fall to 6–5 on the season, 1–2 against division rivals, 2–4 on the road, and 11–3 at Cleveland Browns Stadium. This is only the third time Pittsburgh has lost a game in Ohio ever since their quarterback Ben Roethlisberger, an Ohio native who was sitting out of the game due to injury, was drafted by them in 2004. Also, Mike Tomlin's record against the Browns all-time would drop to 9–2. The Browns would eventually become the only division rival whom the Steelers would lose to on the road during the season, after winning in Cincinnati on Sunday Night Football and before winning in Baltimore the next week; the 2000 season was the last time these three events occurred together.

==== Week 13: at Baltimore Ravens ====
Week Thirteen: Pittsburgh Steelers at Baltimore Ravens – Game summary

Quarter	1	2	3	4	Total
**Steelers**	3	3	7	10	**23**
Ravens	0	13	7	0	**20**

at M&T Bank Stadium, Baltimore, Maryland

- Date: December 2
- Game time: 4:25 pm. EST
- Game weather: 57 °F (14 °C), (Partly Cloudy)
- Game attendance: 71,442
- Referee: Alberto Riveron
- TV announcers (CBS): Jim Nantz and Phil Simms
- Game Book

Game information

**First quarter** Steelers 3–0 – S. Suisham 46 Yard Field Goal (7:12) **Second quarter** Tied 3–3 – J. Tucker 45 Yard Field Goal (13:52)

Ravens 6–3 – J. Tucker 23 Yard Field Goal (9:34)

Ravens 13–3 – A. Boldin 28 Yard Pass from J. Flacco (J. Tucker Kick) (3:16)

Ravens 13–6 – S. Suisham 41 Yard Field Goal (0:32) **Third quarter** Tied 13–13 – J. Dwyer 16 Yard Run (S. Suisham Kick) (11:05)

Ravens 20–13 – R. Rice 34 Yard Run (J. Tucker Kick) (4:50) **Fourth quarter** Tied 20–20 – H. Miller 7 Yard Pass from C. Batch (S. Suisham Kick) (7:24)

Steelers 23–20 – S. Suisham 42 Yard Field Goal (0:00)

**Top passers**

- PIT – C. Batch (25/36, 276 Yds, 1 TD, 1 INT)
- BAL – J. Flacco (16/34, 188 Yds, 1 TD, 1 INT)

**Top rushers**

- PIT – J. Dwyer (16 Car, 49 Yds, 1 TD)
- BAL – R. Rice (12 Car, 78 Yds, 1 TD)

**Top receivers**

- PIT – H. Miller (5/6, 97 Yds, 1 TD)
- BAL – A. Boldin (5/12, 81 Yds, 1 TD)

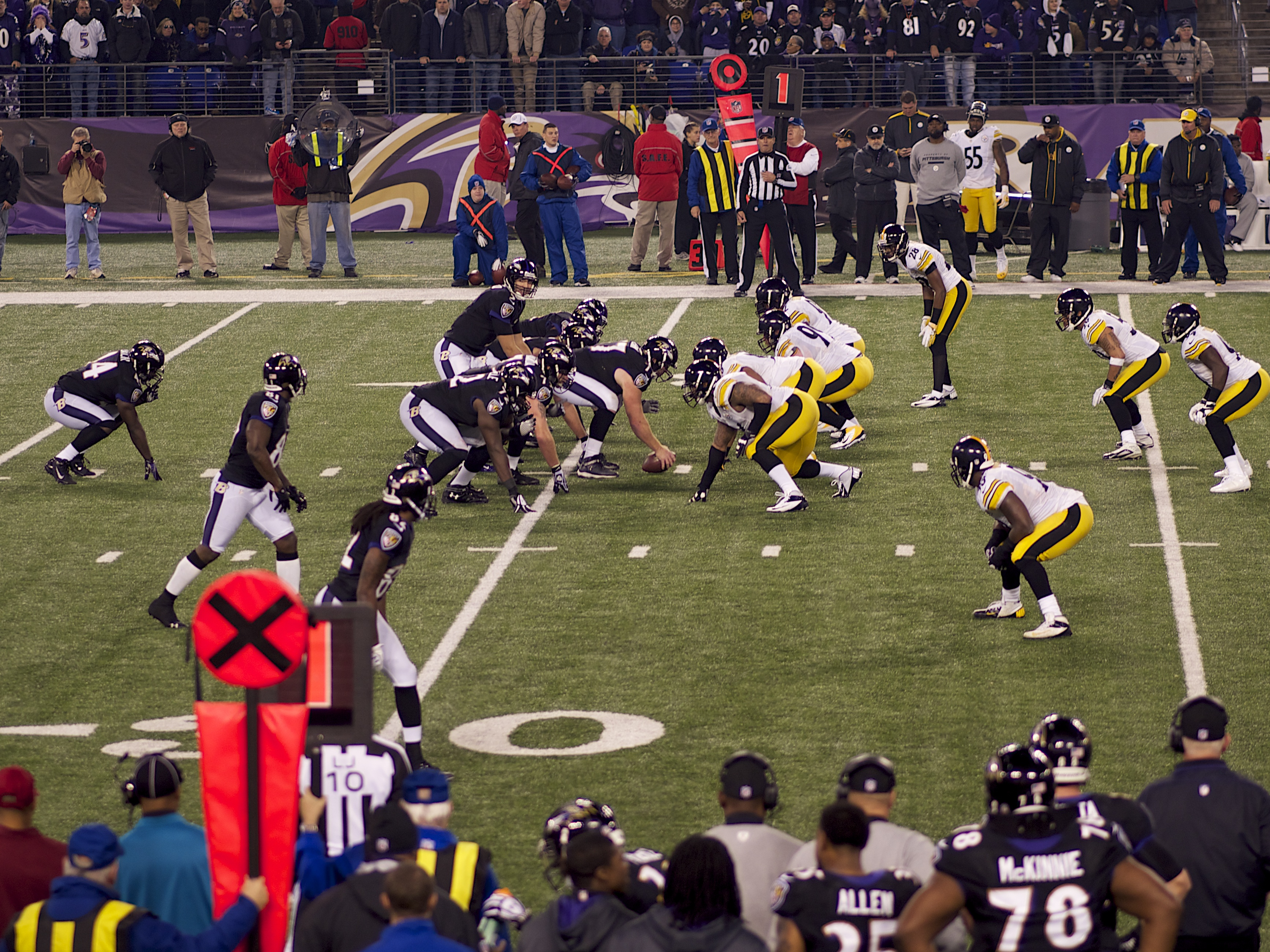
Pittsburgh at Baltimore on December 2

Coming off an 8 turnover performance against the Browns, the Steelers looked to avoid a three-game losing streak. Pittsburgh 3rd-string quarterback, Charlie Batch led the Steelers a 3–0 lead for the first quarter and then after 13 unanswered points by the Ravens, the Steelers outscored the Ravens 20–7 through the rest of the game, giving them a 23–20 victory over the Ravens. This was the Steelers' first win against the Ravens since the 2010–2011 season.

==== Week 14: vs. San Diego Chargers ====
Week Fourteen: San Diego Chargers at Pittsburgh Steelers – Game summary

Quarter	1	2	3	4	Total
**Chargers**	3	10	14	7	**34**
Steelers	0	3	7	14	**24**

at Heinz Field, Pittsburgh, Pennsylvania

- Date: December 9
- Game time: 1:00 pm. EST
- Game weather: 45 °F (7 °C), (Light Rain)
- Referee: Scott Green
- TV announcers (CBS): Jim Nantz and Phil Simms
- Game Book

Game information

**First quarter** Chargers 3–0 – N. Novak 51-yard Field Goal (3:06) **Second quarter** Chargers 10–0 – D. Alexander 39-yard pass from P. Rivers (N. Novak Kick) (3:40)

Chargers 13–0 – N. Novak 39 Yard Field Goal (0:50)

Chargers 13–3 – S. Suisham 49 Yard Field Goal (0:00) **Third quarter** Chargers 20–3 – M. Floyd 3-yard pass from P. Rivers (N. Novak Kick) (5:28)

Chargers 27–3 – Q. Jammer fumble recovery in end zone (N. Novak Kick) (5:16)

Chargers 27–10 – M. Wallace 40-yard pass from B. Roethlisberger (S. Suisham Kick) (2:33) **Fourth quarter** Chargers 34–10 – D. Alexander 15-yard pass from P. Rivers (N. Novak Kick) (9:46)

Chargers 34–17 – M. Wallace 11-yard pass from B. Roethlisberger (S. Suisham Kick) (6:07)

Chargers 34–24 – A. Brown 1-yard pass from B. Roethlisberger (S. Suisham Kick) (0:58)

**Top passers**

- SD – P. Rivers (21/41, 200 Yds, 3 TD, 0 INT)
- PIT – B. Roethlisberger (22/42, 285 Yds, 3 TD, 1 INT)

**Top rushers**

- SD – R. Matthews (25 Car, 65 Yds, 0 TD)
- PIT – J. Dwyer (8 Car, 32 Yds, 0 TD)

**Top receivers**

- SD – D. Alexander (7/11, 88 Yds, 2 TD)
- PIT – M. Wallace (7/11, 112 Yds, 2 TD)

With the loss the Steelers dropped to 7–6 overall, 4–2 in home games, 1–3 against the AFC West, and 14–1 all-time at home against the San Diego Chargers despite Big Ben returning to the field from injury. The win for San Diego was the first regular season road victory in Pittsburgh in franchise history. They became the only AFC North team to lose to the Chargers, win less than three games against all four AFC West teams, and not win any of those matchups in regulation.

With losses by the Ravens and Bengals on the same day, the AFC North title remains in sight for Pittsburgh, who will travel to Dallas next week to take on the Cowboys, a team they have faced three times out of their eight appearances in the Super Bowl. Both teams share the NFL-record number of Super Bowl appearances for a franchise, tied at eight, and remain the only two teams to face each other more than twice in Super Bowl matchups.

==== Week 15: at Dallas Cowboys ====
Week Fifteen: Pittsburgh Steelers at Dallas Cowboys – Game summary

Quarter	1	2	3	4	OT	Total
Steelers	0	10	7	7	0	**24**
**Cowboys**	3	7	7	7	3	**27**

at Cowboys Stadium, Arlington, Texas

- Date: December 16
- Game time: 4:25 pm. EST
- Game weather: 72 °F (22 °C), (Clear)
- Game attendance: 95,595
- Referee: Clete Blakeman
- TV announcers (CBS): Jim Nantz and Phil Simms
- Game Book

Game information

**First quarter**

- Cowboys 3–0 – D. Bailey 50 Yard Field Goal (8:41)

**Second quarter**

- Cowboys 10–0 – J. Witten 17 Yard Pass from T. Romo (D. Bailey Kick) (11:02)
- Cowboys 10–3 – S. Suisham 32 Yard Field Goal (6:07)
- Tied 10–10 – H. Miller 30 Yard Pass from B. Roethlisberger (S. Suisham Kick) (0:34)

**Third quarter**

- Cowboys 17–10 – D. Bryant 24 Yard Pass from T. Romo (D. Bailey Kick) (6:03)
- Tied 17–17 – J. Dwyer 1 Yard Run (S. Suisham Kick) (4:16)

**Fourth quarter**

- Steelers 24–17 – A. Brown 7 Yard Pass from B. Roethlisberger (S. Suisham Kick) (12:37)
- Tied 24–24 – D. Murray 3 Yard Run (D. Bailey Kick) (3:08)

**Overtime**

- Cowboys 27–24 – D. Bailey 21 Yard Field Goal (0:39)

**Top passers**

- PIT – B. Roethlisberger (24/40, 339 yds, 2 TD, 1 INT)
- DAL – T. Romo (30/42, 341 yds, 2 TD, 0 INT)

**Top rushers**

- PIT – I. Redman (3 car, 30 Yds, 0 TD)
- DAL – D. Murray (14 car, 81 Yds, 1 TD)

**Top receivers**

- PIT – M. Wallace (4/10, 95 Yds, 0 TD)
- DAL – M. Austin (7/10, 79 Yds, 0 TD)

Ben Roethlisberger threw an interception during their second play of overtime, handing the win to Dallas. With the overtime loss, the Steelers enabled the arch-rival Ravens (9–5) to secure their fifth consecutive playoff berth by dropping to 7–7 on the season, thus moving them down to third place in the AFC North with their playoff hopes in jeopardy. Pittsburgh also finished their regular season at 3–5 in road games after dropping to 0–2 at Cowboys Stadium (the other loss there was to the Packers in Super Bowl XLV).

The Steelers hope to rebound at home against the second-place Bengals (8–6) next week in what is a must-win game for both AFC North rivals, as only one of them will be able to join Baltimore in the playoffs, unless the Indianapolis Colts lose their final two games or the Miami Dolphins lose at least one of their final two games. It will be the fourth straight week in which the Steelers will be featured on NFL on CBS's marquee game.

==== Week 16: vs. Cincinnati Bengals ====
Week Sixteen: Cincinnati Bengals at Pittsburgh Steelers – Game summary

Quarter	1	2	3	4	Total
**Bengals**	7	3	0	3	**13**
Steelers	0	7	3	0	**10**

at Heinz Field, Pittsburgh, Pennsylvania

- Date: December 23
- Game time: 1:00 pm. EST
- Game weather: 35 °F (2 °C), (Sunny)
- Game attendance: 63,236
- Referee: Mike Carey
- TV announcers (CBS): Jim Nantz and Phil Simms
- Game Book

Game information

**First quarter** Bengals 7–0 – L. Hall 17-yard interception return (J. Brown kick) (02:15) **Second quarter** Bengals 10–0 – J. Brown 41-yard Field Goal (01:53)

Bengals 10–7 – A. Brown 60-yard pass from B. Roethlisberger (S. Suisham kick) (01:09) **Third quarter** Tied – 10–10 – S. Suisham 40-yard Field Goal (04:01) **Fourth quarter** Bengals – 13–10 – J. Brown 43-yard Field Goal (00:04)

**Top passers**

- CIN – A. Dalton (24/41, 278 Yds, 0 TD, 2 INT)
- PIT – B. Roethlisberger (14/28, 220 Yds, 1 TD, 2 INT)

**Top rushers**

- CIN – B. Green-Ellis (15 Car, 14 Yds, 0 TD)
- PIT – R. Mendenhall (11 Car, 50 Yds, 0 TD)

**Top receivers**

- CIN – A. Green (10/18, 116 Tds, 0 TD)
- PIT – A. Brown (5/6, 97 Yds, 1 TD)

Quarterback Ben Roethlisberger, for the second week in a row, would throw a costly interception with a chance to win the game. With the loss, the Steelers not only fell to 7–8, but have also been eliminated from the playoff race for the first time since 2009 and faced their first non-winning season since 2006. It is also worth noting that the Steelers have missed the playoffs whenever they lost at least one game to Cincinnati during a given season from 2006 to 2012.

Pittsburgh hopes to avoid getting swept by the Browns for the first time since 1988 during their home finale in Week 17, and facing their first losing season since 2003, which was also the last time the Browns have won a game in Pittsburgh. By virtue of the Browns' loss later that afternoon in Denver, the Steelers are assured of third place in the AFC North for the season.

==== Week 17: vs. Cleveland Browns ====
Week Seventeen: Cleveland Browns at Pittsburgh Steelers – Game summary

Quarter	1	2	3	4	Total
Browns	0	3	7	0	**10**
**Steelers**	0	10	7	7	**24**

at Heinz Field, Pittsburgh, Pennsylvania

- Date: December 30
- Game time: 1:00 pm. EST
- Game weather: 28 °F (−2 °C), (Cloudy)
- Game attendance: 51,831
- Referee: Walt Coleman
- TV announcers (CBS): Spero Dedes and Steve Beuerlein
- Game Book

Game information

**First quarter**

**Second quarter**

Steelers – 3–0 – S. Suisham 41 yd. field goal (7:53)

Browns – 3–3 – P. Dawson 51 yd. field goal (3:48)

Steelers – 10–3 – L. Pope 1 yd. pass from B. Roethlisberger (S. Suisham kick) (0:47)

**Third quarter**

Browns – 10–10 – G. Little 7 yd. pass from T. Lewis (P. Dawson kick) (11:03)

Steelers – 17–10 – A. Brown 9 yd. pass from B. Roethlisberger (S. Suisham kick) (4:39)

**Fourth quarter**

Steelers – 24–10 – P. Burress 12 yd. pass from B. Roethlisberger (S. Suisham kick) (3:20)

**Top passers**

- CLE – T. Lewis (204)
- PIT – B. Roethlisberger (134)

**Top rushers**

- CLE – B. Jackson (54)
- PIT – J. Dwyer (52)

**Top receivers**

- CLE – B. Watson (64)
- PIT – E. Sanders (28)

After losing to the Bengals, the Steelers stayed home for a regular season finale against the 5–10 Browns. After a scoreless first quarter, the Steelers would draw first blood moving ahead 3–0 off of a Shaun Suisham 41-yard field goal. However, the Browns managed to tie it up with Phil Dawson's 51-yard field goal at 3–3. The Steelers pulled away not long before halftime with Roethlisberger's 1-yard touchdown pass to Leonard Pope to take a 10–3 lead at halftime. After the break, Browns 3rd string QB Thaddeus Lewis to WR Greg Little to tie the game 10–10. However, the Steelers responded with Roethlisberger's 9-yard touchdown pass to WR Antonio Brown to move ahead 17–10. In the fourth quarter, the Steelers would increase their lead with Roethlisberger's 12-yard touchdown pass to WR Plaxico Burress to make it 24–10. The defense shut down the Browns' offense and therefore the team saved their season and finished 8–8, avoiding a losing season for the first time since 2003.

During the game, the Steelers' defense forced 4 turnovers (1 interception, 3 lost fumbles) in retaliation for their 8 turnovers during their 20–14 loss at Cleveland when the Browns' defense got 3 interceptions and 5 lost fumbles. This brings the Steelers' yearly total of turnovers against the Browns to 5 in both games (2 interceptions, 3 lost fumbles). Heinz Field's turnout of 51,831 fans was the smallest for a Steelers game since their current stadium's opening in 2001.

== Standings ==
AFC North
	W	L	T	PCT	DIV	CONF	PF	PA	STK
^{(4)} Baltimore Ravens	10	6	0	.625	4–2	8–4	398	344	L1
^{(6)} Cincinnati Bengals	10	6	0	.625	3–3	7–5	391	320	W3
Pittsburgh Steelers	8	8	0	.500	3–3	5–7	336	314	W1
Cleveland Browns	5	11	0	.313	2–4	5–7	302	368	L3

== Transactions ==
- On February 7, 2012, the Pittsburgh Steelers named Todd Haley as offensive coordinator.
- On February 8, 2012, the Pittsburgh Steelers signed free agents (WR) Juamorris Stewart and (OLB) Brandon Hicks.
- On February 29, 2012, the Pittsburgh Steelers released (WR) Hines Ward.
- On March 2, 2012, the Pittsburgh Steelers released (DE) Aaron Smith and (ILB) James Farrior.
- On March 3, 2012, the Pittsburgh Steelers released (G) Chris Kemoeatu.
- On March 12, 2012, the Pittsburgh Steelers tendered offers to (WR) Mike Wallace, (CB) Keenan Lewis, (FS) Ryan Mundy, (TE) David Johnson, (C) Doug Legursky and (G) Ramon Foster.
- On March 21, 2012, the Pittsburgh Steelers signed free agents (WR) Wes Lyons and (FB) Will Johnson.
- On April 10, 2012, the Pittsburgh Steelers signed unrestricted free agent (TE) Leonard Pope to a 1-year contract.
- On April 12, 2012, the Pittsburgh Steelers re-signed unrestricted free agent (G) Trai Essex to a 1-year contract.
- On April 16, 2012, the Pittsburgh Steelers re-signed unrestricted free agent (QB) Charlie Batch to a 1-year contract.
- On April 26, 2012, the Pittsburgh Steelers re-signed unrestricted free agent (QB) Byron Leftwich to a 1-year contract.
- On May 2, 2012, the Pittsburgh Steelers released (CB) Antonio Smith and (RB) Chad Spann.
- On May 6, 2012, the Pittsburgh Steelers signed fourth-round pick (NT) Alameda Ta'amu and fifth-round pick (RB) Chris Rainey to 4-year contracts.
- On May 8, 2012, the Pittsburgh Steelers signed seventh-round pick (WR) Toney Clemons to a 4-year contract.
- On May 9, 2012, the Pittsburgh Steelers signed second round draft pick (T) Mike Adams and seventh round draft picks (TE) David Paulson and (CB) Terrence Frederick to 4-year contracts.
- On May 10, 2012, the Pittsburgh Steelers signed seventh round draft pick (T) Kelvin Beachum to a 4-year contract.
- On May 29, 2012, the Pittsburgh Steelers signed third round draft pick (ILB) Sean Spence to a 4-year contract.
- On May 30, 2012, the Pittsburgh Steelers signed free agent (QB) Kordell Stewart to a 1-day contract and announced his retirement.
- On June 13, 2012, the Pittsburgh Steelers signed unrestricted free agents (ILB) Brandon Johnson and (LS) Matt Katula.
- On July 17, 2012, the Pittsburgh Steelers re-signed free agent (T) Max Starks to a 1-year contract.
- On July 19, 2012, the Pittsburgh Steelers released (T) Jonathan Scott.
- On July 23, 2012, the Pittsburgh Steelers signed undrafted free agent (T) Bridger Buche to a 1-year contract.
- On July 24, 2012, the Pittsburgh Steelers re-signed Mike Tomlin to a 3-year contract extension (5-year contract) through the 2016 season.
- On July 24, 2012, the Pittsburgh Steelers signed first-round pick (G) David DeCastro to a 4-year contract.
- On July 27, 2012, the Pittsburgh Steelers re-signed (WR) Antonio Brown to a 5-year contract extension through 2017.
- On July 31, 2012, the Pittsburgh Steelers signed undrafted free agent (WR) Paul Cox to a 1-year contract and released (T) Bridger Buche.
- On August 3, 2012, the Pittsburgh Steelers signed free agent (CB) Josh Victorian to a 1-year contract and placed (CB) Terry Carter on the Waived/Injured List.
- On August 23, 2012, the Pittsburgh Steelers fired special teams coordinator Al Everest.
- On August 27, 2012, the Pittsburgh Steelers released (ILB) Ryan Baker, (NT) Mike Blanc, (WR) Paul Cox, (CB) Andre Freeman, (K) Daniel Hrapmann, (OLB) Mortty Ivy (Waived/Injured List), (T) Kyle Jolly, (LS) Matt Katula, (TE) Jamie McCoy, (CB) Walter McFadden, (TE) Justin Peelle, (FS) Myron Rolle, (WR) Juamorris Stewart, (NT) Kade Weston and (WR) Jimmy Young.
- On August 27, 2012, the Pittsburgh Steelers claimed (RB) DuJuan Harris off of waivers from the Jacksonville Jaguars.
- On August 28, 2012, the Pittsburgh Steelers re-signed restricted free agent (WR) Mike Wallace to a 1-year contract and released (RB) Jason Ford.
- On August 31, 2012, the Pittsburgh Steelers released (WR) Tyler Beiler, (NT) Corbin Bryant, (WR) Toney Clemons, (G) Trai Essex, (CB) Terrence Frederick, (WR) David Gilreath, (RB) DuJuan Harris, (OLB) Brandon Hicks, (DE) Ikponmwosa Igbinosun, (QB) Jerrod Johnson, (P) Jeremy Kapinos (Waived/Injured List), (G) Ryan Lee, (G) John Malecki, (WR) Marquis Maze, (ILB) Marshall McFadden, (T) Chris Scott, (SS) Da'Mon Cromartie-Smith, (DE) Jake Stoller, (CB) Josh Victorian and (WR) Derrick Williams.
- On September 1, 2012, the Pittsburgh Steelers agreed to terms with (WR) Toney Clemons, (WR) David Gilreath, (G) Ryan Lee, (G) John Malecki, (TE) Jamie McCoy, (ILB) Marshall McFadden, (SS) Da'Mon Cromartie-Smith and (CB) Josh Victorian for practice squad.
- On September 7, 2012, the Pittsburgh Steelers signed free agent (CB) DeMarcus Van Dyke to a 1-year contract.
- On October 16, 2012, the Pittsburgh Steelers signed (NT) Corbin Bryant to the active roster, signed (G) Jacques McClendon to the practice squad and released (TE) Jamie McCoy.
- On October 16, 2012, the Pittsburgh Steelers suspended (NT) Alameda Ta'amu for two games.
- On October 20, 2012, the Pittsburgh Steelers promoted (G) John Malecki to the active roster and released (NT) Corbin Bryant.
- On October 27, 2012, the Pittsburgh Steelers promoted (SS) Da'Mon Cromartie-Smith to the active roster and released (G) John Malecki.
- On October 29, 2012, the Pittsburgh Steelers reinstated (NT) Alameda Ta'amu.
- On October 31, 2012, the Pittsburgh Steelers released (SS) Da'Mon Cromartie-Smith.
- On November 12, 2012, the Pittsburgh Steelers promoted (WR) David Gilreath to the active roster and released (NT) Alameda Ta'amu.
- On November 15, 2012, the Pittsburgh Steelers promoted (ILB) Marshall McFadden to the active roster and signed (TE) Jamie McCoy to the practice squad.
- On November 20, 2012, the Pittsburgh Steelers signed unrestricted free agent (WR) Plaxico Burress and free agent (QB) Brian Hoyer to 1-year contracts and also released (RB) Baron Batch and (ILB) Marshall McFadden.
- On November 26, 2012, the Pittsburgh Steelers promoted (G) John Malecki to the active roster and released (WR) David Gilreath.
- On December 8, 2012, the Pittsburgh Steelers promoted (CB) Josh Victorian to the active roster and released (QB) Brian Hoyer.
- On December 11, 2012, the Pittsburgh Steelers suspended (RB) Rashard Mendenhall for one game for conduct detrimental to the team and promoted (RB) Baron Batch to the active roster.
