= Heath Miller =

American football player (born 1982)

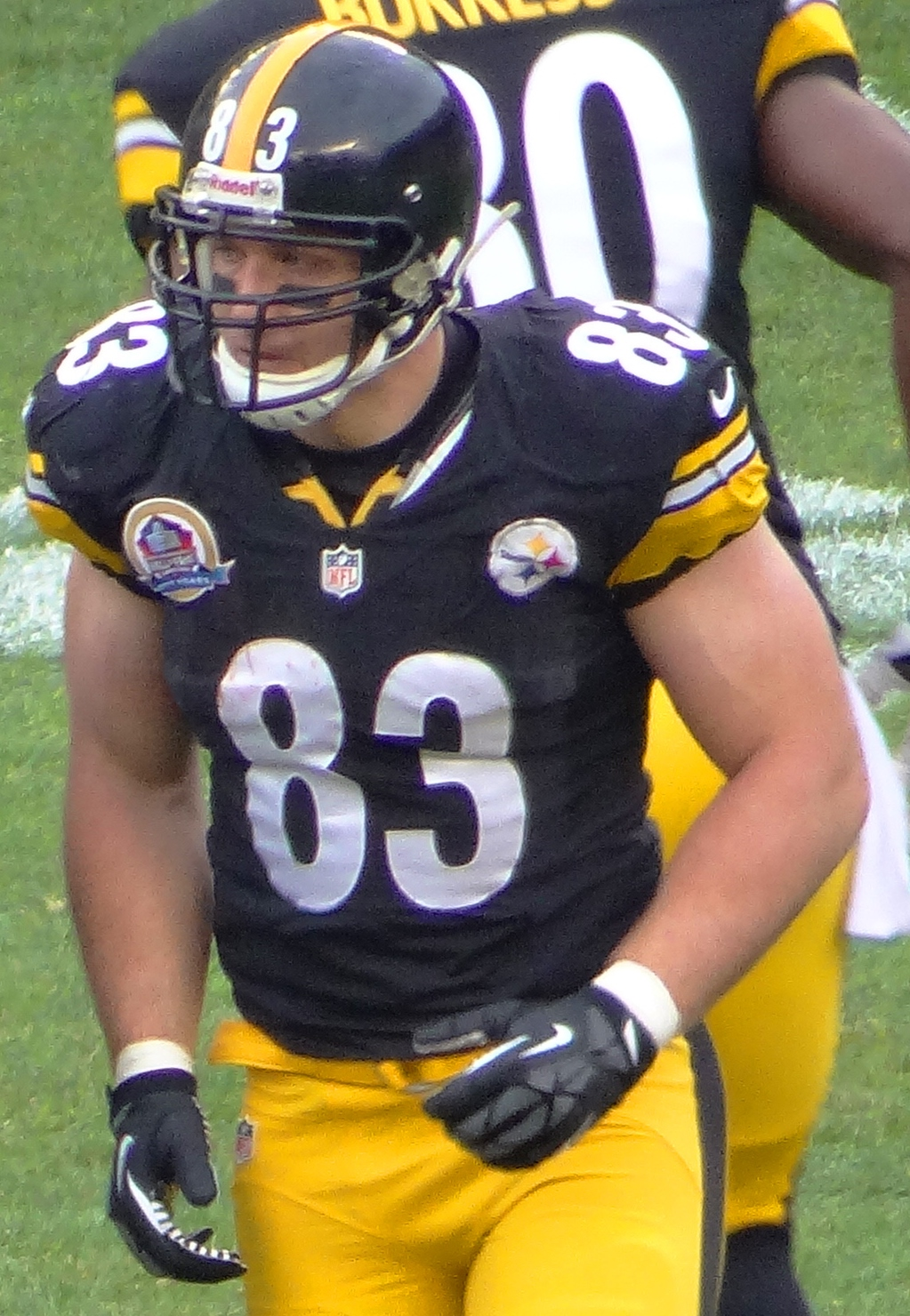
- Miller with the Pittsburgh Steelers in 2012

No. 83
- Position: Tight end

Personal information
- Born: October 22, 1982 (age 44); Richlands, Virginia, U.S.
- Listed height: 6 ft 5 in (1.96 m)
- Listed weight: 256 lb (116 kg)

Career information
- High school: Honaker (Honaker, Virginia)
- College: Virginia (2001–2004)
- NFL draft: 2005: 1st round, 30th overall pick

Career history
- Pittsburgh Steelers (2005–2015)

Awards and highlights
- 2× Super Bowl champion (XL, XLIII); 2× Pro Bowl (2009, 2012); PFWA All-Rookie Team (2005); Pittsburgh Steelers Hall of Honor; John Mackey Award (2004); Unanimous All-American (2004); First-team Freshman All-American (2002); 2× First-team All-ACC (2003, 2004); Second-team All-ACC (2002); Virginia Cavaliers Jersey No. 89 retired

Career NFL statistics
- Receptions: 592
- Receiving yards: 6,569
- Receiving touchdowns: 45
- Stats at Pro Football Reference

Earl Heath Miller Jr. (born October 22, 1982) is an American former professional football player who was a tight end for the Pittsburgh Steelers of the National Football League (NFL) for 11 seasons from 2005 to 2015. Miller played college football for the Virginia Cavaliers, earning unanimous All-American honors and winning the John Mackey Award. The Steelers selected him in the first round with the 30th overall pick of the 2005 NFL draft.

== Early life ==
Miller was born on October 22, 1982, in Richlands, Virginia. He attended Honaker High School and lived in Swords Creek, Virginia. He played quarterback for the Honaker Tigers high school football team, where he earned the Associated Press Player of the Year honor as a senior and was a two-time AP All-State selection. He also earned the All-Southwest Virginia first-team honors at quarterback and was a second-team all-state selection at defensive back, adding Region D Offensive Player of the Year accolades. He set several school records in passing and leading the team to its first state championship game his senior year, in which they lost to King William High School, 25–15.

While attending high school, Miller also played first base for the baseball team where he earned the Black Diamond District first-team honors, and was an All-Region and All-State selection. He was also a forward on the basketball team where he earned the All-District and All-Region honors.

== College career ==
=== Freshman season ===
Miller attended the University of Virginia, where he played for coach Al Groh's Virginia Cavaliers football team from 2001 to 2004. Originally signed to play quarterback, Miller made the transition to the tight end position during his redshirt freshman year.

After sitting out in 2001, he started every game in 2002 at tight end. In his first game against Colorado State, he had 4 receptions, 42 receiving yards, and 1 touchdown. He scored touchdowns in each of his first five games at Virginia, setting a school season record for tight ends and led Atlantic Coast Conference (ACC) tight ends in receiving all three seasons of his college career.

It took him seven games to set the school record for touchdowns by a tight end. He also threw one pass during his college career, connecting with fellow tight end Patrick Estes for a touchdown against South Carolina in 2002. He also caught a touchdown pass in the same game. In a win against Wake Forest he was held to three catches, two of them going for touchdowns. His five-game streak ended when he was held without a catch against Duke. Against Clemson, he caught a 15-yard touchdown pass from Matt Schaub in a 22–17 win. Against North Carolina, he had a season-long 42-yard reception. The following week, Miller had a season-high, six catches for 50 yards against Penn State. Against Virginia Tech, Miller recorded a 15-yard touchdown reception. In the 2002 Continental Tire Bowl win against the West Virginia, he had a season-high 54 receiving yards on three catches. He ended the 2002 season with 33 receptions, 327 receiving yards, nine touchdown catches, and one touchdown pass, leading all ACC tight ends in touchdowns and receptions. His nine touchdown catches were an ACC record for tight ends. He was voted second-team All-ACC and first-team Freshman All-American First by The Sporting News.

=== Sophomore season ===
Miller opened the 2003 season with five receptions, 54 receiving yards, and one touchdown against Duke. He followed the performance with three catches for 51 yards against Western Michigan and three catches for 17 yards against South Carolina. In a comeback win against Wake Forest, he led the team in catches for the fourth consecutive game with 7 receptions, 94 receiving yards, and one touchdown. He caught a 15-yard pass in the closing minute to set up the game-winning field goal. After a four-catch, 44-yard performance against North Carolina, he posted eight receptions, 52 yards, and one touchdown in an overtime loss to Clemson. Miller had nine receptions, for 77-yards, and a touchdown against the #7-ranked Florida State. Against Georgia Tech, he caught six passes for 110 yards and a touchdown. He won the ACC Offensive Lineman of the Week Award for this performance. A week later, he had a career game against in-state rivals Virginia Tech with 13 catches for 145 yards, earning a second consecutive ACC Offensive Lineman of the Week Award. He scored the first touchdown in 2003 Continental Tire Bowl against the Pittsburgh, a 52-yard pass from Matt Schaub. He finished the 2002 season with an ACC record of 70 receptions and 835 receiving yards. He was voted second-team All-American by College Football News and first-team All-ACC.

=== Junior season ===
Miller was voted team captain before his junior season. Miller caught three passes for 45 yards and a touchdown against Temple, extending his streak of consecutive games with at least one catch to 22. The streak ended the following week, when he was held without a catch against North Carolina. The following week, he made six receptions for 54 yards and two touchdowns against Akron. Against Syracuse, he caught a 54-yard pass for his only reception in the game. Miller had four catches for 55 yards and a score in a Thursday night win against Clemson. The following game, Miller had season highs of nine catches and 110 yards in a loss against Florida State. Miller played his final college game against Fresno State in the 2004 MPC Computer Bowl. He led the team with five catches and 66 receiving yards. He finished the 2004 season with 41 receptions for 541 yards and five touchdowns. Miller was named unanimous first-team All-American for the 2004 season and was voted first-team All-ACC. He also became the first ACC player to win the John Mackey Award given to the top college tight end.

Miller ended his college career with ACC records for most career receptions (144), yards (1,703) and touchdowns (20) by a tight end. Miller finished second in receptions, seventh in yards, and fourth in touchdown receptions for all positions. He also shares the school record for most 100-yard games by a tight end (3), and he caught at least one pass in 32 of his final 33 games. Miller skipped his senior season to enter the 2005 NFL draft, becoming the fifth player in school history to enter the draft early.

== Professional career ==
Pre-draft measurables
Height	Weight
6 ft 5 in (1.96 m)	256 lb (116 kg)
All values from NFL Combine

=== 2005: Rookie season and first Super Bowl ===
The Pittsburgh Steelers selected Miller in the first round (30th overall) of the 2005 NFL draft. He was the third tight end drafted by Pittsburgh in the first round in 15 years. On July 26, 2005, the Steelers signed Miller to a five-year, $6.89 million contract with $4.54 million guaranteed and a signing bonus of $3.94 million.

He entered training camp competing with veterans Jerame Tuman and Matt Kranchick for the starting tight end position. Miller was named the starting tight end to begin the regular season. He made his professional regular season debut in the Pittsburgh Steelers' season-opener against the Tennessee Titans and caught his first career touchdown on a three-yard pass from Ben Roethlisberger in a 34–7 victory. On October 23, 2005, Miller caught a season-high six passes for 58 receiving yards and a touchdown during a 27–13 victory over the Cincinnati Bengals. The next game, he made three receptions for 18-yards and a season-high two touchdowns in a 20–19 win against the Baltimore Ravens. During a Week 17 matchup with the Detroit Lions, he caught three passes for a season-high 62 receiving yards in a 35–21 victory.

He finished his rookie season with 39 receptions for 459 yards and six touchdowns.and was named the Pittsburgh Steelers' Joe Greene Great Performance Award presented to the team's top rookie. The Steelers finished second in the AFC North with an 11–5 record. On January 8, 2006, he appeared in his first career postseason game and caught two passes for 15-yards in a 31–17 AFC Wild Card Round victory over the Cincinnati Bengals. The following game, Miller caught three passes for 61 yards and one touchdown in the Steelers' 21–18 upset over the top-seeded Indianapolis Colts in the Divisional Round. After defeating the Denver Broncos in the AFC Championship, the Steelers went on to play in Super Bowl XL. On February 5, 2006, they defeated the Seattle Seahawks, 21–10, and Miller earned his first Super Bowl ring. He was held without a catch during the game.

=== 2006 season ===
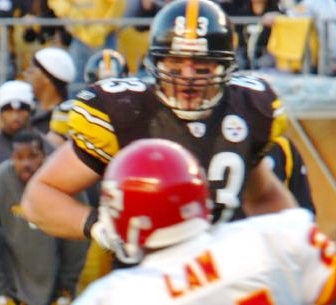
Miller in a game against the Kansas City Chiefs in 2006

He remained as the starter to begin the regular season, beating out Tuman and Tim Euhus. Miller started the season-opener against the Miami Dolphins and caught three passes for 101 receiving yards and scored an 87-yard touchdown reception in a 28–17 victory. Replays showed that he should have been marked out of bounds at about the one-yard line, but the play was not challenged by the Dolphins quickly enough. Miller finished the season with 34 catches for 393 yards and five touchdowns in 16 games and 16 starts.

=== 2007 season ===
Miller was named the starting tight end by Mike Tomlin after beating out Jerame Tuman, Matt Spaeth, and Jonathan Dekker.

On October 21, 2007, Miller made a season-high five receptions for 50-yards and two touchdowns in a 31–28 loss to the Denver Broncos in Week 7. In a Week 10 matchup against the Cleveland Browns, Miller caught five passes for a season-high 71 receiving yards and a touchdown in a 31–28 victory. In 2007, Miller set new career highs for touchdowns (7), receptions (47), and receiving yards (566) and played in all 16 games.

The Pittsburgh Steelers finished first in the AFC North with a 10–6 record in their first year under Mike Tomlin. On January 5, 2008, the Pittsburgh Steelers faced the Jacksonville Jaguars in the AFC Wild Card Round and Miller caught eight passes for 85-yards and scored on a 14-yard touchdown reception in a 31–29 loss.

=== 2008: Second Super Bowl season ===
On November 3, 2008, Miller suffered an ankle injury as the Steelers routed the Washington Redskins, 23–6. He missed the next two games due to the injury. During a Week 16 matchup against the Tennessee Titans, Miller caught a season-high eight passes for 69 receiving yards in a 31–14 loss. He finished the 2008 season with a total of 48 receptions for 514 receiving yards and was limited to three touchdowns in 14 games and 14 starts.

The Pittsburgh Steelers finished first in the AFC North with a 12–4 record. On January 11, 2009, the Steelers played the San Diego Chargers in an AFC Divisional round matchup and Miller finished the 35–24 victory with three receptions for 37 yards and scored on an 8-yard touchdown reception. In the AFC Championship Game against the Baltimore Ravens, he caught three passes for 62 receiving yards in a 28–14 victory. On February 1, 2009, the Pittsburgh Steelers appeared in Super Bowl XLIII against the Arizona Cardinals, Miller had five receptions for 57-yards in a 27–23 last second victory and earned his second career Super Bowl ring.

=== 2009 season ===
On July 30, 2009, the Pittsburgh Steelers signed Miller to a six-year, $35.3 million extension with a $12.5 million signing bonus.

On October 4, 2009, Miller had eight receptions for 70 receiving yards and a season-high two touchdown during a 38–28 win over the San Diego Chargers. His first touchdown reception of the season was a six-yard pass from Ben Roethlisberger. In Week 6, he caught five passes for 80 receiving yards and caught an eight-yard touchdown reception, as the Steelers defeated the Cleveland Browns 27–14. On December 20, 2009, Miller had seven receptions for a season-high 118 receiving yards in a 37–36 victory over the Green Bay Packers. He finished with 76 receptions for 789 yards and six touchdowns and started all 16 games. Miller was selected to his first Pro Bowl on January 25, 2009, replacing the Colts' tight end Dallas Clark who participated in the Super Bowl XLIV.

=== 2010 season: Third Super Bowl appearance ===
He began the regular season being named the Pittsburgh Steelers captain for the offense. On October 17, 2010, the Pittsburgh Steelers defeated the Cleveland Browns 28–10 and Miller caught two passes for 50 receiving yards and scored his first touchdown of the season on a 14-yard pass from Ben Roethlisberger. During a Week 10 matchup against the New England Patriots, Miller caught five passes for 60-yards in a 39–26 loss. In a Week 13 matchup with the Baltimore Ravens, he suffered a concussion that sidelined him for the next two games. On December 23, 2010, he caught five passes for a season-high 73 yards, as the Steelers routed the Carolina Panthers, 27–3. Miller finished the regular season with 42 receptions, 512 receiving yards, and two touchdowns in 14 starts.

The Steelers finished the 2010 season with a 12–4 record and first in the AFC North. On January 15, 2011, the Pittsburgh Steelers faced the Baltimore Ravens in the AFC Divisional Round after having a bye during the wildcard. Miller led the Steelers with five catches for 39 yards and caught a nine-yard touchdown reception in the 31–24 victory. During the AFC Championship victory over the New York Jets, he caught two passes for 38 yards. On February 6, 2011, the Pittsburgh Steelers appeared in Super Bowl against the Green Bay Packers, with Miller catching two passes for 12 yards during the 31–25 loss.

=== 2011 season ===
During a Week 7 matchup against the Arizona Cardinals, Miller made four receptions for 59 yards and a touchdown, while also having his first career carry for a six-yard gain in a 38–20 victory. On December 19, 2011, the Pittsburgh Steelers played the San Francisco 49ers and Miller finished the 20–3 loss with five receptions for a season-high 82 receiving yards. Miller became the Steelers' all-time leader in career receptions for a tight end, passing Elbie Nickel and moved into the top five on the Steelers' all-time receptions list. He finished the regular season with 51 receptions, 651 receiving yards, and two touchdowns while starting all 16 games.

=== 2012 season ===
New offensive coordinator Todd Haley named him the starting tight end to begin the regular season, over Jamie McCoy, Leonard Pope, and David Paulson.

He started the season-opener against the Denver Broncos and made four catches for 50 receiving yards and a touchdown during the 31–19 loss. On September 23, 2012, Miller caught a season-high eight passes for 60 yards and tied his career-high with two touchdown receptions in a 34–31 loss to the Oakland Raiders. On October 11, 2012, in a loss against the Tennessee Titans, Miller had six receptions for 67 yards moving him past Louis Lipps for third place on the Steelers' all-time receptions list. During a Week 13 matchup against the Baltimore Ravens, he caught five passes for a season-high 97 receiving yards and a touchdown in the 23–20 victory. On December 23, 2011, Miller suffered a torn MCL and ACL during a 13–10 loss to the Cincinnati Bengals. He was placed on injured-reserve for the remainder of the season and was also selected to the Pro Bowl. After the season, Miller was voted team MVP by his teammates. He finished the season with 71 receptions for 816 yards and eight touchdowns, career highs for receiving yards and touchdowns. He was ranked 97th by his fellow players on the NFL Top 100 Players of 2013.

=== 2013 season ===
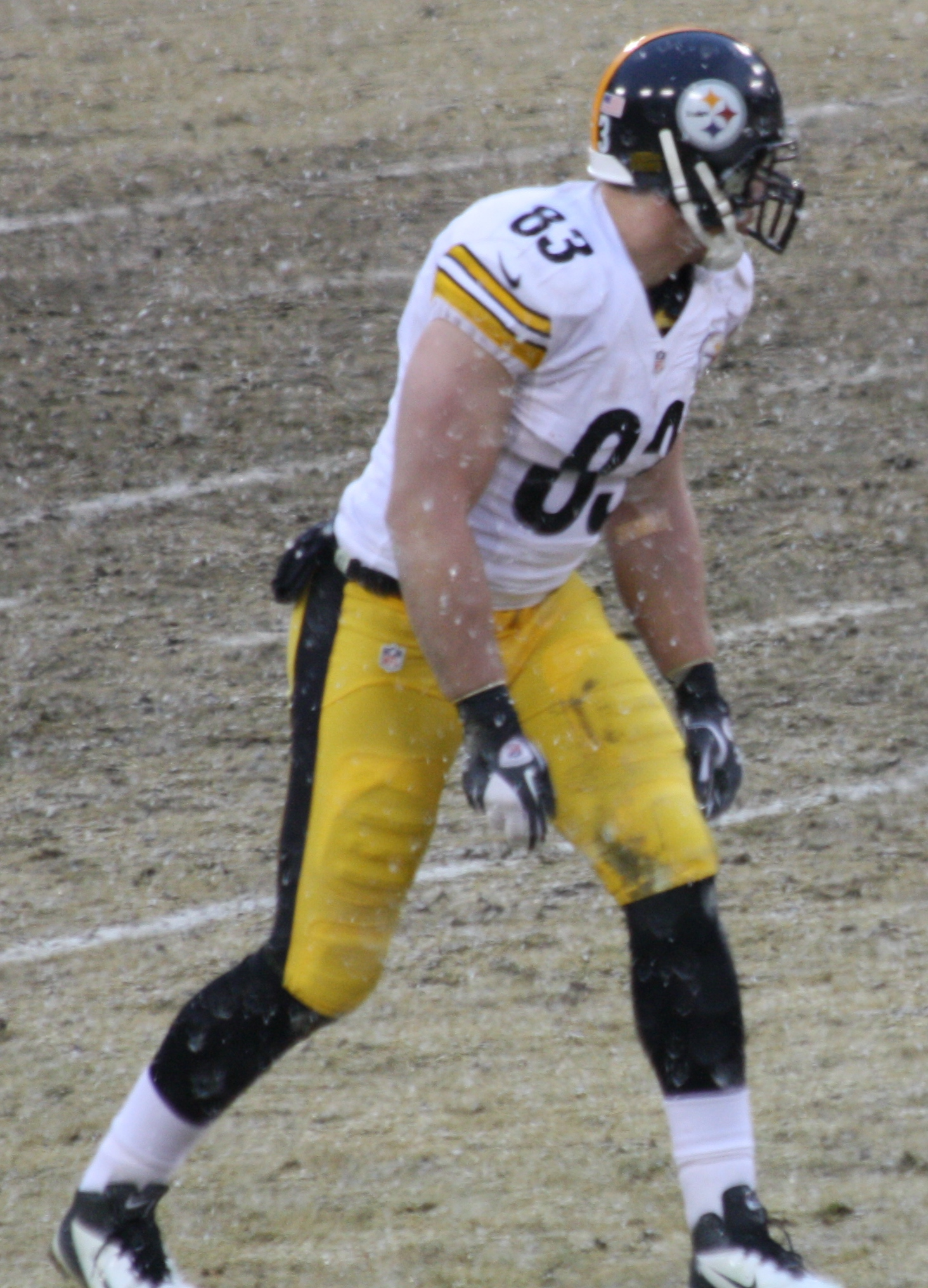
Miller lined up at wideout in 2013

After suffering a torn MCL and ACL, Miller underwent reconstructive surgery to repair three torn ligaments and a rehab program to regain his form. Prior to the beginning of the regular season, the Pittsburgh Steelers removed Miller from the Physically Unable to Perform list in hopes of him returning within a month. With Matt Spaeth also recovering from a lisfranc surgery, the Steelers began the season with David Paulson and Jamie McCoy.

On September 11, 2013, the Pittsburgh Steelers restructured his base salary for 2013 from $5.61 million to $2.61 million.

On October 20, 2013, Miller made two receptions for 17 yards and caught an 8-yard pass from Ben Roethlisberger for his only touchdown of the season during a 19–16 win over the Baltimore Ravens. During a Week 13 matchup against the Baltimore Ravens, he caught a season-high eight passes for a season-high 86 yards in 22–20 loss. He finished the season with 58 receptions for 593 receiving yards and a touchdown in 14 games.

=== 2014 season ===
On March 5, 2014, the Pittsburgh Steelers restructured Miller's contract to reduce the cost of his contract towards their salary cap. He was scheduled to cost the Steelers $9.2 million towards the cap but it was reduced to $6.5 million, with Miller earning $1.02 million in 2014. The Steelers also agreed to pay Miller $4.5 million for the remaining two years. On September 28, 2014, Miller caught a season-high ten passes for 85 receiving yards and scored on an eight-yard touchdown reception, marking his first touchdown of the season, during a 27–24 loss to the Tampa Bay Buccaneers. During Week 8, he made seven receptions for a season-high 112 yards and caught an 11-yard touchdown pass from Ben Roethlisberger, as the Steelers routed the Indianapolis Colts, 51–34. He also caught his 500th career reception during the game. He finished the 2014 season with 66 receptions for 761 receiving yards and three touchdowns in 16 starts.

The Pittsburgh Steelers finished the season first in the AFC North with an 11–5 record. On January 3, 2015, Miller caught six passes for 76 yards in a 30–17 AFC Wild Card Round loss to the Baltimore Ravens.

=== 2015: Final season ===
He started the season-opener against the New England Patriots and caught eight passes for 84-yards in a 28–21 loss. On November 1, 2015, Miller caught ten passes for a season-high 105 receiving yards in a 16–10 loss to the Cincinnati Bengals. On November 15, 2015, Miller was named the backup quarterback against the Cleveland Browns after the starting quarterback Landry Jones sprained his ankle. Although Roethlisberger was still injured, he came in to finish the game with Miller as the emergency backup quarterback. In Week 12, Miller suffered a rib injury during the second quarter of a 39–30 loss to the Seattle Seahawks. He missed the next game with the injury. During a Week 14 contest against the Cincinnati Bengals, he caught a season-high ten passes for 60 yards and had his second career carry for a two-yard gain in a 33–20 victory. On January 3, 2016, he made three catches for 18 yards and caught his last career touchdown on a two-yard pass from Ben Roethlisberger during the 28–12 victory over the Cleveland Browns. He finished his last season with 60 receptions for 535 receiving yards and two touchdowns in 15 games and 15 starts.

The Pittsburgh Steelers finished the season with a 10–6 record, landing them second in the AFC North. They faced the Cincinnati Bengals in the AFC Wild Card Round and he caught two passes for nine yards in an 18–16 victory. On January 17, 2016, Miller played in his last career game and caught one pass for a seven-yard gain during the Steelers' 23–16 AFC Divisional Round loss to eventual Super Bowl 50 Champions the Denver Broncos.

On February 19, 2016, Miller announced his retirement from football after an 11-season career with the Pittsburgh Steelers.

Miller finished his career as the Steelers' franchise leader in receptions, receiving yards, and receiving touchdowns as a tight end.

== NFL career statistics ==
Legend
	Won the Super Bowl
**Bold**	Career high

=== Regular season ===
Year	Team	GP	Receiving							Fumbles	
Year	Team	GP	Rec	Tgt	Yds	Avg	Lng	TD	FD	Fum	Lost
2005	PIT	16	39	52	459	11.8	50	6	22	0	0
2006	PIT	16	34	55	393	11.6	**87**	5	21	0	0
2007	PIT	16	47	61	566	12.0	29	7	32	0	0
2008	PIT	14	48	66	514	10.7	22	3	29	1	1
2009	PIT	16	**76**	98	789	10.4	41	6	37	**2**	**2**
2010	PIT	14	42	67	512	12.2	36	2	24	1	1
2011	PIT	16	51	74	631	**12.4**	39	2	36	1	1
2012	PIT	15	71	**101**	**816**	11.5	43	**8**	**44**	0	0
2013	PIT	14	58	79	593	10.2	31	1	30	1	1
2014	PIT	16	66	91	761	11.5	49	3	42	**2**	1
2015	PIT	15	60	81	535	8.9	27	2	29	0	0
Career		168	592	825	6,569	11.1	87	45	346	8	7

== Personal life ==
He is the son of Earl and Denise. He and his wife, Katie, were married during the 2007 offseason. They have three sons and a daughter, Chase, Jake, Cole, and Morgan. Miller is involved with a number of charities. Miller has participated in the Salvation Army and WTAE TV's Annual Mini Golf Classic as host. Miller has also been involved in charities such as fashion shows and high school fundraising basketball games.

In 2018, Miller was named to the Virginia Sports Hall of Fame.
