= Isaiah Green =

Isaiah Green may refer to:

- Isaiah L. Green (1761–1841), U.S. Representative from Massachusetts
- Isaiah Green (gridiron football) (born 1989), American football cornerback
