= Jonathan Dwyer =

American football player (born 1989)

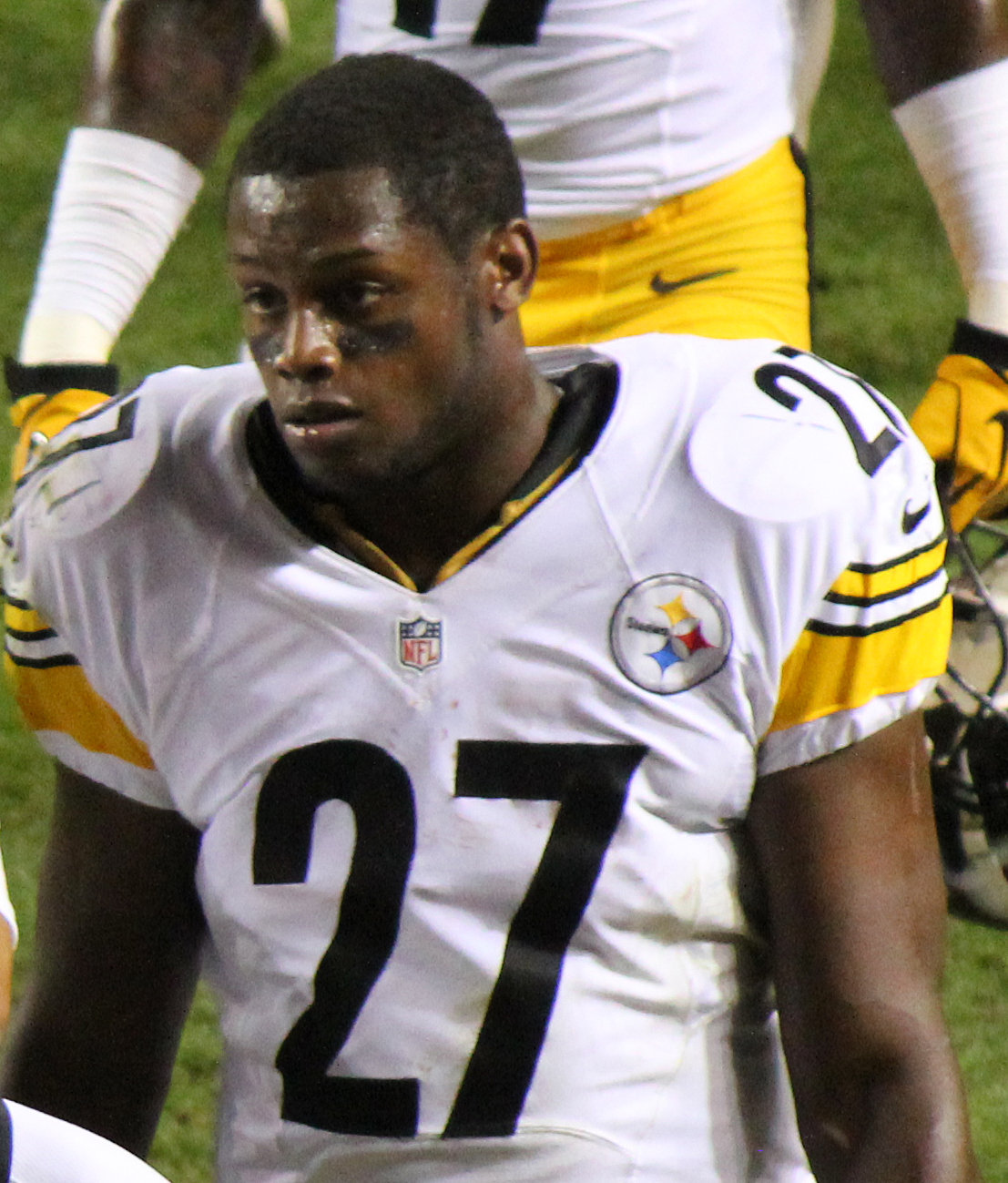
- Dwyer with the Pittsburgh Steelers in 2012

No. 27, 20
- Position: Running back

Personal information
- Born: July 26, 1989 (age 37); Woodstock, Georgia, U.S.
- Listed height: 5 ft 11 in (1.80 m)
- Listed weight: 229 lb (104 kg)

Career information
- High school: Carlton J. Kell (Marietta, Georgia)
- College: Georgia Tech (2007–2009)
- NFL draft: 2010: 6th round, 188th overall pick

Career history
- Pittsburgh Steelers (2010–2013); Arizona Cardinals (2014)

Awards and highlights
- First-team All-American (2008); ACC Player of the Year (2008); ACC Offensive Player of the Year (2008); 2× First-team All-ACC (2008, 2009)

Career NFL statistics
- Rushing attempts: 246
- Rushing yards: 1,022
- Receptions: 29
- Receiving yards: 184
- Total touchdowns: 3
- Stats at Pro Football Reference

Jonathan Avery Dwyer (born July 26, 1989) is an American former professional football player who was a running back in the National Football League (NFL). He played college football for the Georgia Tech Yellow Jackets and was selected by the Pittsburgh Steelers in the sixth round of the 2010 NFL draft. He also played in the NFL for the Arizona Cardinals.

== Early life ==
Dwyer was highly recruited coming out of Kell High School in Marietta, Georgia. He was a four-star prospect and many of the top NCAA Division I football programs expressed interest. Dwyer was awarded Georgia's Player of the Year (football). He initially made a soft verbal commitment to the Florida Gators but then decided that he preferred to stay closer to his family and committed to Georgia Tech.

In track, he finished second in the state in the Class AAAAA 100-meter dash as a junior, with a time of 10.81 seconds, the second best time in the state of Georgia, and recorded a 4.48 in the 40 yard dash. He ran a career-best time of 10.70 seconds in the 100 meters at the 2006 GATFXC Coaches Invitational, placing first. He also placed third in the 200 meters at the USATF Region III Championships, with a personal-best time of 21.87 seconds.

== College career ==
=== 2007 ===
After committing to Georgia Tech, Dwyer got plenty of playing time as the backup running back to senior Tashard Choice. He played in all thirteen games during his freshman year. Choice battled leg injuries during the course of the 2007 season, which led to Dwyer rushing for 436 yards on 82 attempts and nine touchdowns. He was named to the ACC All-Freshman Team.

=== 2008 ===
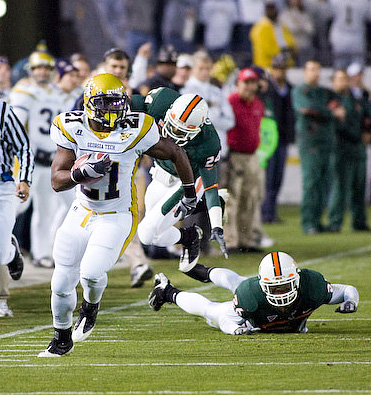
Dwyer breaks past the Miami Hurricanes in 2008.

Dwyer was named as a candidate for the Doak Walker award, an award given to the nation's best running back. Through the first four games of the 2008 season, Dwyer had 389 rushing yards on just 48 attempts with four touchdowns. Against Mississippi State, he recorded the longest touchdown from the line of scrimmage in Georgia Tech history, running for an 88-yard touchdown. He continued to have a good season with 147 yards against a tough Florida State defense, with a 36-yard touchdown run and a 66-yard touchdown. The following week, in a disappointing loss to the North Carolina Tar Heels, Dwyer recorded 157 yards on the ground, 85 of them coming in a long touchdown run where he again displayed his speed. Against Miami in a Thursday night game, Dwyer had 10 carries for 128 yards on the ground with runs of 35 yards and a 58-yard touchdown. The following week, he had a 60-yard touchdown, as well as a 23-yard touchdown against Georgia. He ended the game with 144 yards on the ground against a tough SEC defense and proved that he was one of the top backs in the country. He was the ACC player of the year and was a unanimous first-team selection as well as being the #1 rusher in the ACC with 1,328 yards rushing and 12 touchdowns.

=== 2009 ===
Former Yellow Jackets running back Tashard Choice said that Dwyer would have a great season in 2009: "He's going to be among the leading rushers in the country next year, and if he stays healthy, he could lead the nation in rushing. He's that good." On January 11, 2010, Dwyer announced he had decided to enter his name in the 2010 NFL draft and forgo his senior season.

=== College awards and honors ===
- Parade All-American
- 2007: ACC rookie of the week (September 9, 2007)
- 2007 ACC All-Freshman team
- 2008 preseason candidate for the Doak Walker Award
- 2008 ACC Player of the Year
- 2008 Pro Football Weekly 1st-Team All-American
- 2008 Consensus 1st-Team All-ACC
- 2009 Pre-Season All American
- 2009 2nd-team All-ACC
- 2009 ACC Champions (football)

== Professional career ==
=== Pre-draft ===
Pre-draft measurables
Height	Weight	Arm length	Hand span	40-yard dash	10-yard split	20-yard split	20-yard shuttle	Three-cone drill	Vertical jump	Broad jump	Bench press
5 ft 11 1/4 in (1.81 m)	229 lb (104 kg)	31 in (0.79 m)	8 5/8 in (0.22 m)	4.51 s	1.69 s	2.64 s	4.29 s	7.31 s	33.0 in (0.84 m)	8 ft 11 in (2.72 m)	18 reps
All values from NFL Combine/Pro Day

Dwyer entered the 2010 NFL draft and was at one point considered to be a top 30 prospect and in the top 3 running backs in the draft according to Todd McShay. He was questioned if he could adjust to playing in a pro-style offense, due to the fact that he spent most of his college career playing in a flexbone spread option offense at Georgia Tech. Dwyer's stock began to fall as questions about his weight and conditioning arose, including notably after the NFL Combine (40 yard dash: 4.59, 3-Cone Drill: 7.56, 20-yard shuttle: 4.67, Bench: 15 reps). Dwyer tested positive for amphetamines at the 2010 NFL Scouting Combine, however it was later ruled exempt by the NFL after it was found that the positive test stemmed from his attention deficit disorder (ADD) medicine.

=== Pittsburgh Steelers ===
==== 2010 season ====
Dwyer was selected by the Pittsburgh Steelers in the sixth round (188th overall) of the 2010 NFL draft. On September 5, 2010, Dwyer made the team's final roster cut.

Dwyer made his professional debut in week 17 against the Cleveland Browns after the Steelers had built a commanding first half lead and rested Rashard Mendenhall in the second half. He rushed for 28 yards on 9 carries in the game.

==== 2011 season ====
Dwyer again made the final roster cut after a strong showing in the pre-season. In the final game in pre-season, he rushed for 88 yards and got reps with the first team offense.

With Rashard Mendenhall nursing a hamstring injury and backup Mewelde Moore out with a foot injury, Dwyer made his 2011 debut against the Tennessee Titans in week 5. He had a strong performance, rushing for 107 yards on 11 carries, including a 76-yard dash to set up a short Ben Roethlisberger touchdown pass.

==== 2012 season ====
At the start of the 2012 season, Dwyer came to training camp overweight, and was in question of making the team for his third season. However, he was able to bring down his weight and make the final roster cut for the Steelers.

With Rashard Mendenhall and Isaac Redman out with injuries in a week 7 game against the Cincinnati Bengals, Dwyer started the game for the Steelers. He rushed 17 times for 122 yards in the game. The following week, Dwyer had 17 carries for 107 yards against the Washington Redskins. He became the first Steelers running back since Willie Parker in the 2008–2009 season to have consecutive 100-yard games. On November 27, 2012, Steelers head coach Mike Tomlin announced that Dwyer had earned the starting job for the remainder of the season. In the December 2 game against the Baltimore Ravens, he scored his first career touchdown on a 16-yard run.

==== 2013 season ====
Dwyer was released by the Steelers prior to the start of the 2013 season. However, on September 9, 2013, the Steelers re-signed him due to LaRod Stephens-Howling suffering a torn ACL during their season opening game against the Tennessee Titans.

=== Arizona Cardinals ===
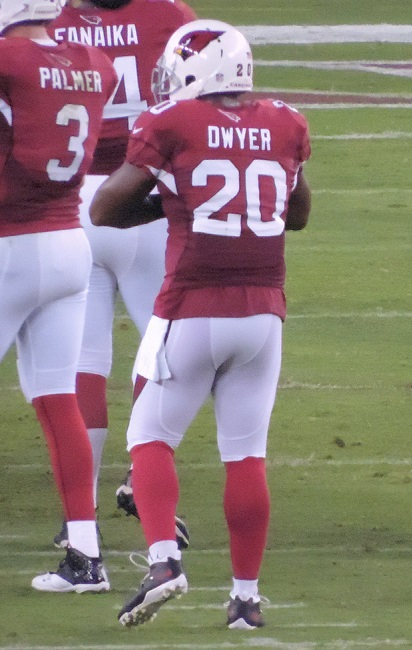
Dwyer playing for the Arizona Cardinals in 2014.

On March 12, 2014, Dwyer signed a one-year contract with the Arizona Cardinals. On September 17, Dwyer was arrested for domestic violence, and as a result the Cardinals deactivated him from all team activities, placing him on the non-football injury list.

== Personal life ==
On Wednesday, September 17, 2014, Dwyer was arrested due to allegations of two incidents at Dwyer's home in southeast Phoenix on July 21 at 8 a.m. and July 22 at 4 p.m., according to the Phoenix Police Department. The incidents concerned attacks against his wife and 18-month-old child.

Dwyer was booked into Maricopa County Jail on one count of aggravated assault causing a fracture, one count of aggravated assault involving a minor, two counts of criminal damage, one count of preventing the use of a phone in an emergency, and assault. He was freed the next morning on a $25,000 cash bond and ordered to wear an electronic monitoring device. He was also banned from any contact with the alleged victims, travels outside of Arizona and any involvement with weapons, drugs or alcohol.

On September 29, 2014, aggravated assault charge, a class 4 felony, was returned by a Maricopa County Grand Jury. Dwyer also was indicted on eight misdemeanors that included one assault charge for the incidents concerning attacks against his wife and 18-month-old child on July 21 and 22 that occurred at their home.

Jan 30, 2015, Dwyer pleaded guilty to charges of disorderly conduct, a misdemeanor, in Maricopa County Superior Court Thursday.

Formerly of the Steelers, Dwyer was charged initially with felony aggravated assault and criminal damage in an incident where police alleged Dwyer broke his wife's nose in an incident at their home July 21.

Dwyer previously pleaded not guilty to the charges. The lesser charges brought with it a sentence of 18 months probation and community service.

He was taken into custody after a practice with the Cardinals in September, and right after the video footage of ex-Ravens running back Ray Rice hitting his then-fiancé went public. Dwyer was placed on the reserve/non football illness list, keeping him out of the league for the 2014 season.

Dwyer admitted to the incidents during interviews with detectives but denied physically assaulting his wife and baby son. According to police, a search warrant was executed at his home.
