= Toney Clemons =

American football player (born 1988)

No. 17
- Position: Wide receiver

Personal information
- Born: October 11, 1988 (age 38); Pittsburgh, Pennsylvania, U.S.
- Listed height: 6 ft 2 in (1.88 m)
- Listed weight: 210 lb (95 kg)

Career information
- High school: Valley (New Kensington, Pennsylvania)
- College: Colorado
- NFL draft: 2012: 7th round, 231st overall pick

Career history
- Pittsburgh Steelers (2012)*; Jacksonville Jaguars (2012); San Diego Chargers (2013)*; Carolina Panthers (2013–2014)*; Winnipeg Blue Bombers (2015)*
- * Offseason or practice squad member only

Career NFL statistics
- Receptions: 3
- Receiving yards: 41
- Stats at Pro Football Reference

Toney Clemons (born October 11, 1988) is an American former professional football player who was a wide receiver in the National Football League (NFL). He was selected by the Pittsburgh Steelers with the 231st overall pick in the seventh round of the 2012 NFL draft. He played college football for the Michigan Wolverines and Colorado Buffaloes. Because of his transfer and Colorado's move he became the first player to play in the Big Ten Conference, Big 12 Conference and Pac-12 Conference.

== Professional career ==
=== Pittsburgh Steelers ===
Clemons was selected by the Pittsburgh Steelers 231st overall in the seventh round of the 2012 NFL draft.

=== Jacksonville Jaguars ===
Clemons was signed off the Steelers' practice squad by the Jacksonville Jaguars on November 26, 2012.

He was released on August 30, 2013.

=== San Diego Chargers ===
Clemons was signed by the San Diego Chargers to their practice squad on September 1, 2013. He was released on September 25, 2013.

=== Carolina Panthers ===
Clemons was signed to the Carolina Panthers practice squad on October 8, 2013. He was cut on August 24, 2014.

=== Winnipeg Blue Bombers ===
Clemons signed with the Winnipeg Blue Bombers on February 4, 2015. He was placed on the practice roster on June 20, 2015, and released on June 29, 2015.

== Personal life ==
Clemons’ cousin is Steve Breaston.
