= Da'Mon Cromartie-Smith =

American football player (born 1987)

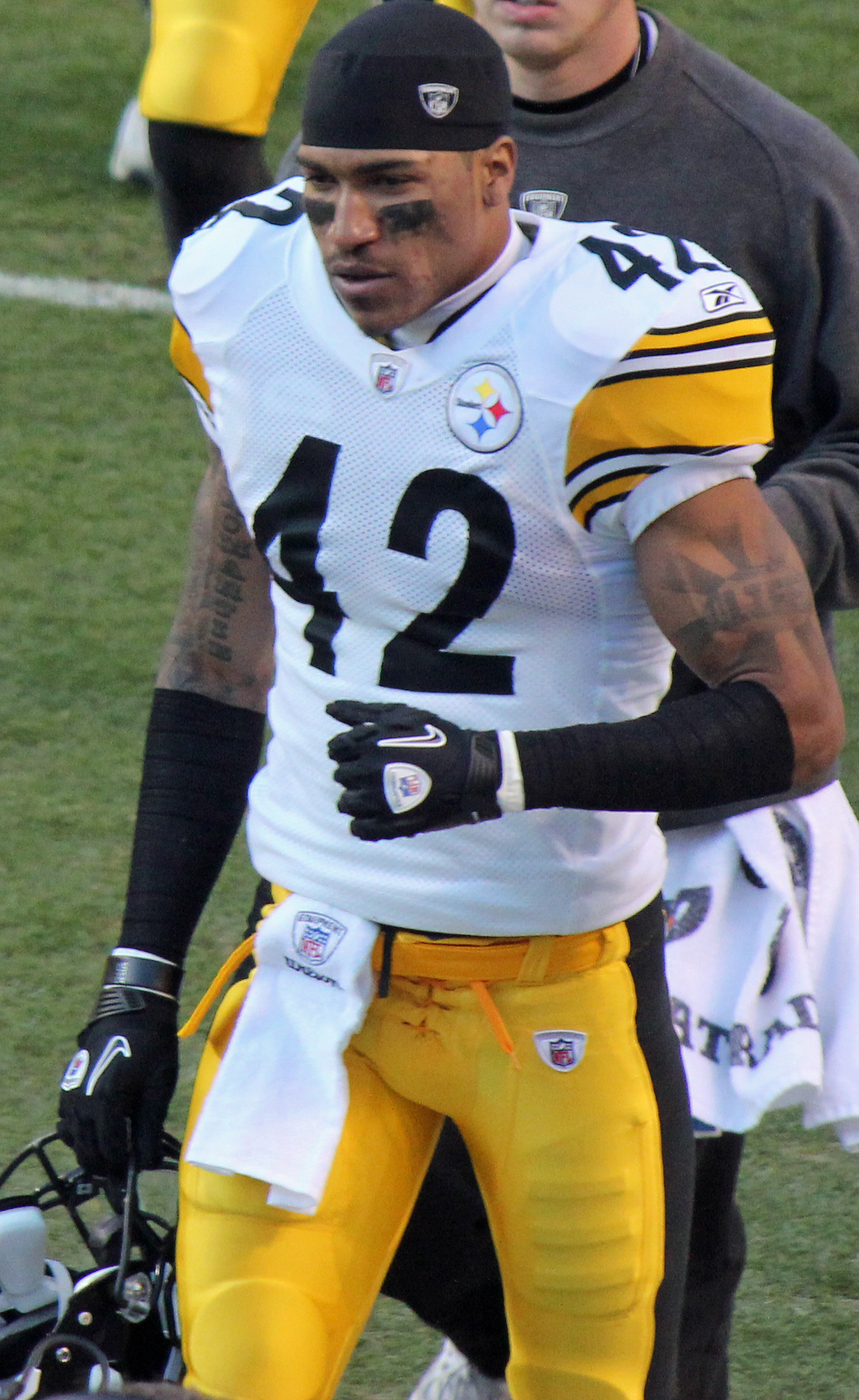
- Cromartie-Smith in 2011

No. 42
- Position: Safety

Personal information
- Born: February 17, 1987 (age 39); Riverside, California, U.S.
- Listed height: 6 ft 2 in (1.88 m)
- Listed weight: 203 lb (92 kg)

Career information
- High school: Rancho Verde (Moreno Valley, California)
- College: Texas-El Paso
- NFL draft: 2010: undrafted

Career history
- Pittsburgh Steelers (2010–2013); Washington Redskins (2014–2015)*
- * Offseason or practice squad member only

Awards and highlights
- First-team All-C-USA (2009)

Career NFL statistics
- Total tackles: 4
- Stats at Pro Football Reference

Da'Mon Jonnel Cromartie-Smith (born February 17, 1987) is a former safety. He was originally signed by the Pittsburgh Steelers as an undrafted free agent in 2010. He played college football for the University of Texas at El Paso.

== College career ==
He played college football at Texas-El Paso.

== Professional career ==
=== Pittsburgh Steelers ===
After going undrafted in the 2010 NFL draft, he signed with the Pittsburgh Steelers.

On December 8, 2011, he made his season debut against the Cleveland Browns. He only recorded one tackle in that game.

On August 31, 2012, he was released.

=== Washington Redskins ===
Cromartie-Smith signed with the Washington Redskins on August 9, 2014. He was released during final cuts on August 29, 2014.

On January 2, 2015, the Redskins signed Cromartie-Smith to a futures contract. On September 5, he was waived with an injury settlement for final roster cuts before the start of the regular season.

== Personal life ==
Cromartie-Smith is the younger brother of retired NFL fullback, Terrelle Smith. On an edition of “The Steel Crew” Podcast, Da’Mon revealed he is not related to former NFL defensive backs Antonio Cromartie, Dominique Rodgers-Cromartie, and Marcus Cromartie.
