= Terrence Frederick =

American football player (born 1990)

No. 36, 37, 35, 25
- Position: Cornerback

Personal information
- Born: February 10, 1990 (age 36); Katy, Texas, U.S.
- Listed height: 5 ft 10 in (1.78 m)
- Listed weight: 187 lb (85 kg)

Career information
- High school: Katy
- College: Texas A&M
- NFL draft: 2012: 7th round, 246th overall pick

Career history
- Pittsburgh Steelers (2012)*; New York Giants (2012); Cleveland Browns (2013)*; New Orleans Saints (2013–2014); Winnipeg Blue Bombers (2016); Hamilton Tiger-Cats (2017)
- * Offseason or practice squad member only

Career NFL statistics
- Total tackles: 19
- Stats at Pro Football Reference

Terrence Dewayne Frederick (born February 10, 1990) is an American former professional football player who was a cornerback in the National Football League (NFL) and Canadian Football League (CFL). He was selected in the seventh round, 246th overall, by the Pittsburgh Steelers in the 2012 NFL draft. He played college football for the Texas A&M Aggies.

== Early life ==
Frederick was born in Katy, Texas, and attended Katy High School. He recorded nine interceptions his senior year in 2007, earning second-team All-State honors.

== College career ==
Frederick played college football for the Texas A&M Aggies from 2008 to 2011. He started six games at cornerback his freshman year in 2008, totaling 33 tackles, one sack, one forced fumble and three pass breakups. He started all 13 games at cornerback in 2009, accumulating 61 tackles and two interceptions. Frederick started all 13 games at cornerback for the second straight season in 2010, recording 57 tackles, one interception, one forced fumble and one fumble recovery, garnering honorable mention All-Big 12 accolades. He started every game at cornerback for the third consecutive season his senior year in 2011, totaling 54 tackles, one interception, 13 pass breakups and one blocked punt that he also returned for a touchdown. Frederick was named honorable mention All-Big 12 for the second straight year in 2011.

== Professional career ==
Frederick was selected in the seventh round, 246th overall, by the Pittsburgh Steelers in the 2012 NFL draft. He was waived by the Steelers on August 31, 2012.

Frederick was signed to the practice squad of the New York Giants on September 8, 2012. He was released on September 11, 2012, and re-signed to the practice squad the next day. He was promoted to the active roster on December 15, 2012, and played in the team's game against the Atlanta Falcons on December 16. Frederick was waived on December 17, 2012, and re-signed to the practice squad on December 19. He was promoted to the active roster again on December 26, 2012, and played in the Giants' game against the Philadelphia Eagles on December 30, 2012, recording two solo tackles. Overall, he appeared in two games during the 2012 season. Frederick was waived by the Giants on August 31, 2013.

Frederick was signed to the practice squad of the Cleveland Browns on September 2, 2013.

Frederick was signed off the Browns' practice squad by the New Orleans Saints on December 25, 2013. He was waived on August 30, 2014, and signed to the Saints' practice squad the next day. He was promoted to the active roster on November 18, 2014. Frederick then played in three games, all starts, for the Saints in 2014, totaling 15 solo tackles and two tackle assists. Frederick was waived by the Saints on September 1, 2015.

He was signed to the practice roster of the Winnipeg Blue Bombers on June 27, 2016. He was later promoted to the active roster and played in nine games, all starts, for the Blue Bombers in 2016, recording 33 tackles, one interception and one sack.

Frederick played in two games, starting one, for the Hamilton Tiger-Cats in 2017, totaling five tackles. He was released on August 17, 2017.
