= Josh Victorian =

American football player (born 1988)

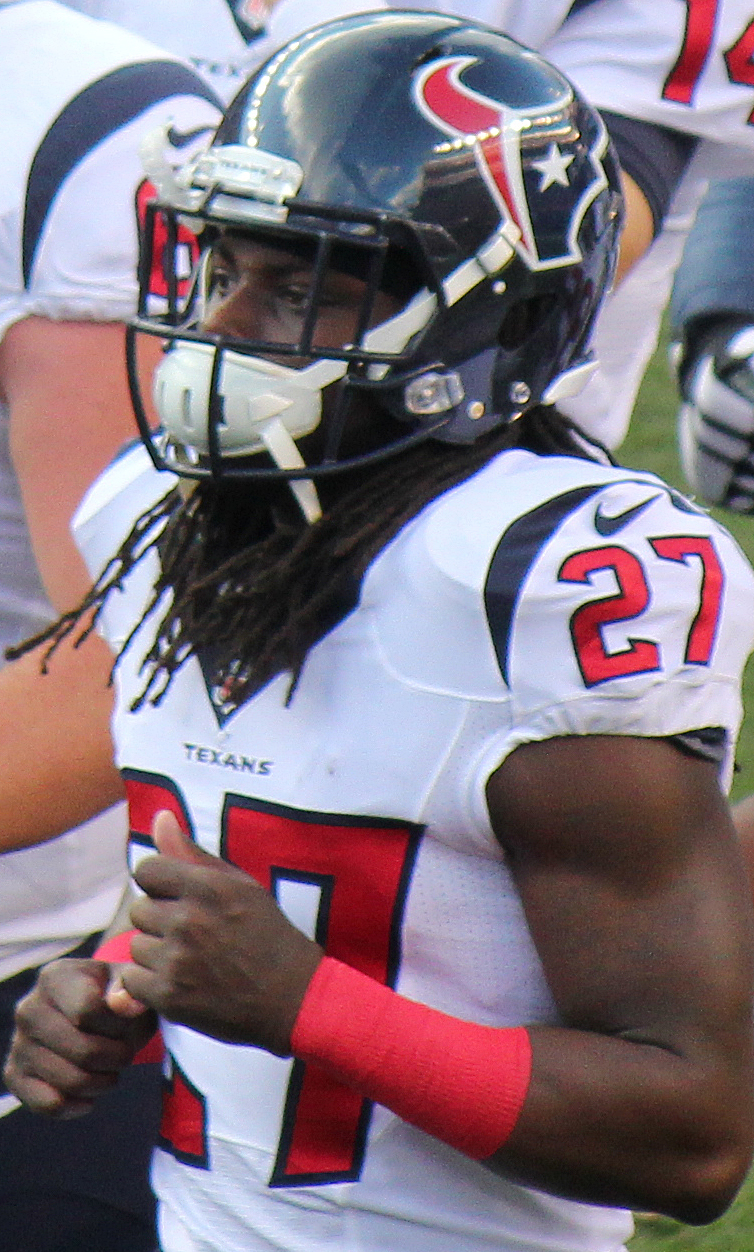
- Victorian with the Houston Texans in 2014

No. 35, 27, 6, 7, 5
- Position: Cornerback

Personal information
- Born: July 10, 1988 (age 38); New Orleans, Louisiana, U.S.
- Listed height: 5 ft 10 in (1.78 m)
- Listed weight: 190 lb (86 kg)

Career information
- High school: Destrehan (LA) Destrehan High School
- College: Louisiana Tech
- NFL draft: 2011: undrafted

Career history
- Baltimore Ravens (2011)*; New England Patriots (2011)*; New Orleans Saints (2012)*; New Orleans VooDoo (2012); Pittsburgh Steelers (2012); Houston Texans (2013); Detroit Lions (2014)*; New York Giants (2014–2015)*; Los Angeles KISS (2015–2016); Baltimore Brigade (2017); Albany Empire (2018)*; Washington Valor (2018); Baltimore Brigade (2018–2019)
- * Offseason or practice squad member only

Awards and highlights
- Second Team All-Arena (2017)

Career NFL statistics
- Total tackles: 15
- Pass deflections: 3
- Stats at Pro Football Reference

Career AFL statistics
- Total tackles: 160
- Fumble recoveries: 4
- Interceptions: 14
- Stats at ArenaFan.com

Joshua Jermaine Victorian (born July 10, 1988) is an American former professional football player who was a cornerback in the National Football League (NFL). He signed with the Baltimore Ravens as an undrafted free agent. He played college football for the Louisiana Tech Bulldogs. He was also a member of the New England Patriots, New Orleans Saints, New Orleans VooDoo, Pittsburgh Steelers, Houston Texans, Detroit Lions, New York Giants, Los Angeles KISS, Albany Empire and Washington Valor.

== Early life ==
Victorian grew up in St. Rose, Louisiana and attended Destrehan High School. He was selected to the first-team All-District 5-5A for three consecutive years while at high school. He also was selected to the first-team ALL-State 2 years consecutively.

== College career ==
He played college football at Louisiana Tech. He finished with 123 tackles, 19 interceptions and 41 pass deflections.

In his senior year, Victorian finished the season with 36 Tackles, 7 Interceptions and 21 pass deflections. On September 4, 2010, he had an interception against Grambling State. On September 25, 2010 in a regular season game against Southern Mississippi in which he had an interception.

In his junior year, Victorian finished the season with 51 Tackles, 7 Interceptions and 7 pass deflections. On October 31, 2009, In a regular season game against Idaho in which he had an interception to go along with 6 tackles but Louisiana Tech loss 35-34. The following week on November 6, 2009, In a game against No.5 ranked Boise State, he had 9 tackles and an interception in which he returned 75 yards for the touchdown with 13:12 minutes left in the 3rd quarter to cut the lead to 27-14 as Louisiana Tech lost the game 45-35.

In his sophomore year, Victorian finished the season with 11 tackles and 3 pass deflections 5 interceptions .

In his freshman year, Victorian finished the season with 25 tackles and 10 pass deflections .

== Professional career ==
On July 28, 2011, Victorian signed with the Baltimore Ravens as an undrafted free agent. On September 3, 2011, Victorian was released.

On September 22, 2011, Victorian was signed to the New England Patriots practice squad. On October 7, 2011, he was re-signed to the practice squad. On October 25, 2011, he was released from the practice squad when the team re-signed Malcolm Williams. On October 28, 2011, he was re-signed to the practice squad. On November 17, 2011, he was released by the team after they re-signed Ross Ventrone to the practice squad. On November 23, 2011, he was re-signed to the practice squad.

On January 18, 2012, Victorian signed with the New Orleans Saints to a reserve/futures contract.

On June 19, 2012, Victorian signed with the New Orleans VooDoo of the Arena Football League.

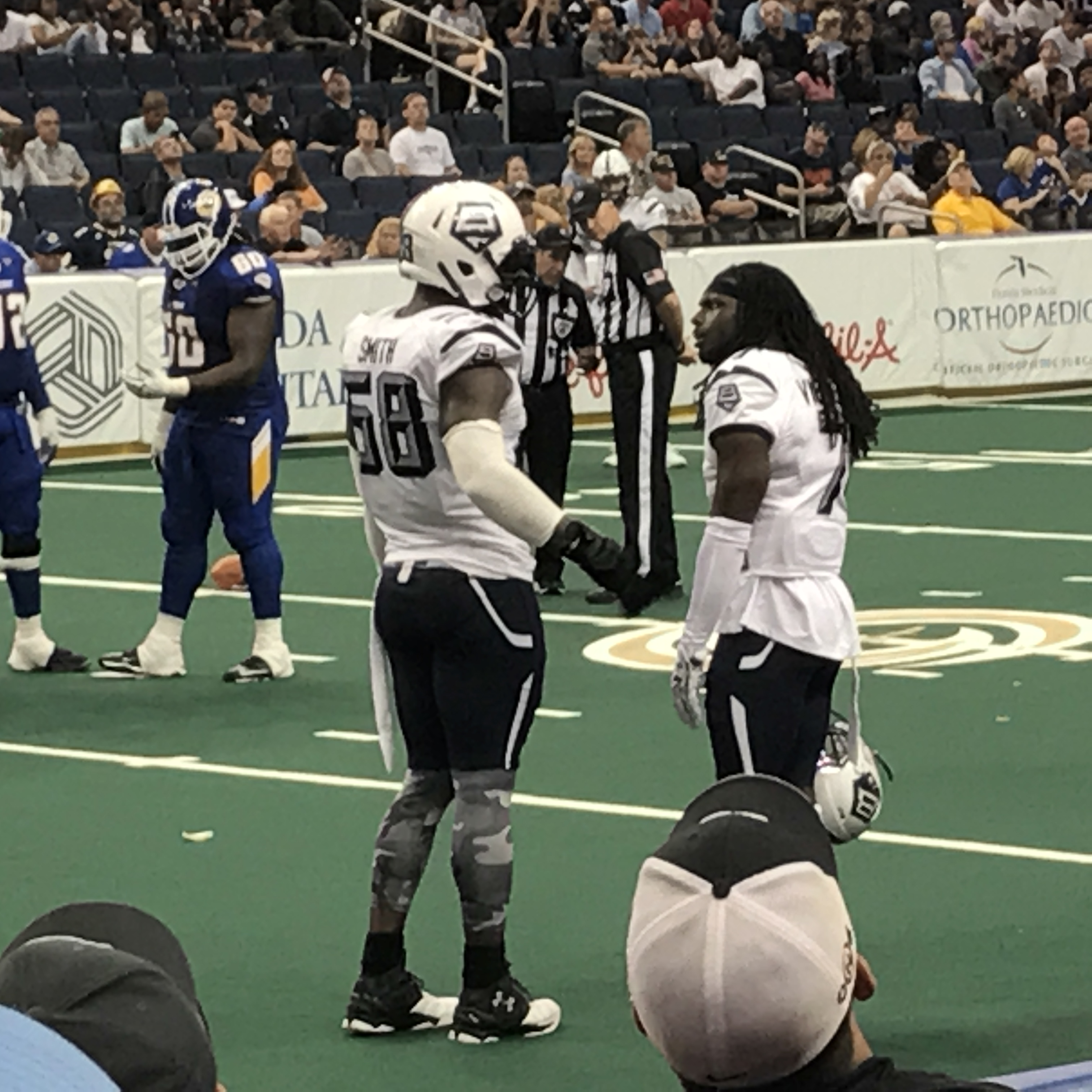
Victorian (right) talking with Khreem Smith in 2017

On August 3, 2012, Victorian signed with the Pittsburgh Steelers. On August 31, 2012, he was released by the Steelers. On September 1, 2012, he was signed to the practice squad. On December 8, 2012, he was signed to the Steelers active roster.

In 2013, Victorian was signed to the Houston Texans practice squad. Victorian was activated to the 53 man roster a week later. Victorian was then released on August 31, 2014.

On September 23, 2014, Victorian was signed to the Detroit Lions practice squad.

On November 12, 2014, Victorian was signed to the New York Giants' practice squad. On April 15, 2015, he was waived by the Giants.

On May 28, 2015, Victorian was assigned to the Los Angeles KISS. On November 4, 2015, the KISS picked up Victorian's rookie option for 2016.

Victorian was assigned to the Baltimore Brigade on February 15, 2017. He earned Second-team All-Arena honors in 2017.

On March 23, 2018, Norman was assigned to the Albany Empire.

On April 12, 2018, he was traded to the Washington Valor. On April 26, 2018, Victorian was placed on reassignment.

On May 2, 2018, Victorian was assigned to the Brigade. He earned 2nd Team All-Arena Honors. In 2019 Victorian was 1st Team All Arena with the Brigade.
