= Alameda Ta'amu =

American football player (born 1990)

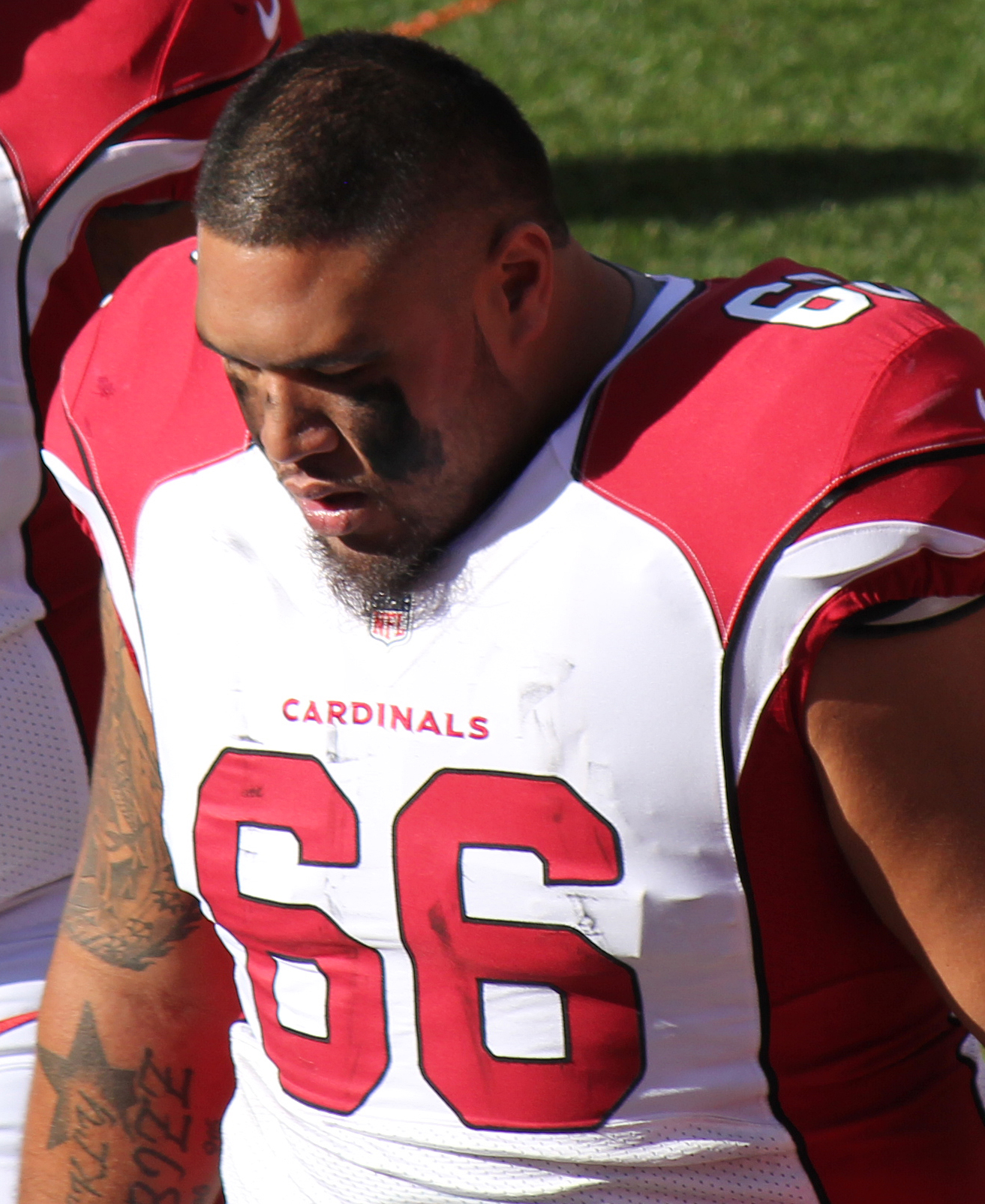
- Ta'amu with the Arizona Cardinals in 2014

No. 95, 66
- Position: Nose tackle

Personal information
- Born: August 23, 1990 (age 36); Alameda, California, U.S.
- Listed height: 6 ft 3 in (1.91 m)
- Listed weight: 348 lb (158 kg)

Career information
- High school: Rainier Beach (Seattle, Washington)
- College: Washington
- NFL draft: 2012: 4th round, 109th overall pick

Career history
- Pittsburgh Steelers (2012); Arizona Cardinals (2013–2014); Kansas City Chiefs (2016)*; Buffalo Bills (2016)*
- * Offseason or practice squad member only

Career NFL statistics
- Total tackles: 7
- Stats at Pro Football Reference

Alameda Eperu Ta'amu (born August 23, 1990) is an American former professional football player who was a nose tackle in the National Football League (NFL). He played college football for the Washington Huskies. He was selected by the Pittsburgh Steelers in the fourth round of the 2012 NFL draft.

== Early life ==
Born in Alameda, California and raised in Kent, Washington, Ta'amu attended Rainier Beach High School in Seattle, Washington, where he was a two-way lineman and ranked as a four-star recruit by Rivals.com. He also had success as a shot putter.

== College career ==
At the University of Washington, Ta'amu played in all 12 games as a true freshman with five starts in 2008. One of 12 true freshman to see playing time, Ta'amu made a season high six tackles versus UCLA. He finished the season with 21 tackles.

As a sophomore in 2009, Ta'amu again played in all 12 games, and he had 11 starts. He had a season high five tackles at Arizona State. He finished the season with 19 tackles, 4.5 for loss, and 2.5 sacks.

In 2010, Ta'amu started all 13 games at defensive tackle in what would be his breakout season. He was a key factor in getting the Huskies back to a bowl game, with a season high seven tackles at Oregon and matched that total versus UCLA. During the 2010 Holiday Bowl, he had a 10-yard sack and 14-yard fumble return. Ta'amu finished the season with 39 tackles, 5 for loss, and 1.5 sacks and earned honorable mention All-Pac-10 honors.

As a senior in 2011, Ta'amu started all 13 games at defensive tackle and was named a team captain prior to the start of the season. In the Apple Cup rivalry game against Washington State, Ta'amu had four tackles, with 2.5 for loss that included two sacks. Ta'amu ended his senior season as an all-Pac-12 honorable mention selection. For the season, Ta'amu had 30 tackles, including 3.5 sacks out of 7.0 total tackles for loss.

== Professional career ==
=== 2012 NFL draft ===
Regarded as one of the few two-gap nose tackles, Ta'amu was projected as a third-to-fourth round draft pick in the 2012 NFL draft. Dane Brugler of CBSSports.com, however, described Ta'amu as "a pass rushing three-technique stuck in a zero-technique's body," who "struggles to hold his ground at the point of attack". The Pittsburgh Steelers nevertheless traded its number 6 pick to move up 10 spots in the fourth round to select Ta'amu with the 109th pick of the 2012 NFL draft.

Pre-draft measurables
Height	Weight	Arm length	Hand span	40-yard dash	10-yard split	20-yard split	20-yard shuttle	Three-cone drill	Vertical jump	Broad jump	Bench press
6 ft 2 3/8 in (1.89 m)	348 lb (158 kg)	32 in (0.81 m)	9 3/4 in (0.25 m)	5.37 s	1.82 s	3.08 s	4.72 s	7.52 s	26 in (0.66 m)	8 ft 7 in (2.62 m)	35 reps
All values from NFL Combine, except 20-ss and 3-cone (Washington Pro Day)

=== Pittsburgh Steelers ===
On November 12, 2012, Ta'amu was waived by the Steelers. He was re-signed on November 15, 2012. During the season, he was inactive for seven games and spent six games on the practice squad.

=== Arizona Cardinals ===
After Ta'amu failed to make the Steelers' 53-man roster, the Arizona Cardinals claimed him off waivers on August 31, 2013.

In the 2013 season, Ta'amu played in 14 games and had six tackles. In 2014, Ta'amu played in seven games and recorded no statistics.

On September 5, 2015, he was released by the Cardinals.

=== Kansas City Chiefs ===
On January 5, 2016, Ta'Amu signed a futures contract with the Kansas City Chiefs. He was cut on August 5, 2016.

=== Buffalo Bills ===
Ta'Amu was signed by the Bills. On August 30, 2016, he was released by the Bills.

He participated in The Spring League in 2017.

== Personal life ==
=== Criminal proceedings ===
In October 2011 Ta'amu was charged with driving under the influence for an incident that occurred December 12, 2009, while he was playing for the University of Washington. The police report stated that Ta'amu was stopped for driving 73 mph in a 60 mph zone at 3:40 a.m. and that he "smelled [of] an odor of alcohol" and had "blood-shot watery eyes". Police said Ta'amu, who was 19 at the time, registered 0.097 and 0.098 on breath tests. Ta'amu pleaded guilty to negligent driving, for which he was sentenced to one day in a community-work program and ordered to pay a $350 fine.

On October 14, 2012, Ta'amu was arrested after he allegedly evaded police while driving intoxicated and struck several parked cars, injuring one person in Pittsburgh's South Side neighborhood. During the chase, before he was apprehended, Ta'amu allegedly shed his shirt in an attempt to evade arrest, claiming he was not the driver of the erratic SUV. As a result of the incident the team suspended Ta'amu for two weeks without pay (from October 16–29, 2012). On April 4, 2013, Ta'amu pleaded guilty to three counts of recklessly endangering another person, resisting arrest and driving under the influence. Charges of aggravated assault were withdrawn by prosecutors. The trial judge found him not guilty of fleeing and eluding arrest because the officer chasing him along East Carson Street was in an unmarked car. Ta'amu was sentenced to serve 18 months probation, four days in a DUI housing program and 150 hours of community service.
