= Isaiah Green (gridiron football) =

American gridiron football player (born 1989)

No. 25
- Position: Cornerback

Personal information
- Born: August 10, 1989 (age 37); Los Angeles, California, U.S.
- Listed height: 5 ft 10 in (1.78 m)
- Listed weight: 180 lb (82 kg)

Career information
- High school: Long Beach Polytechnic (Long Beach, California)
- College: Fresno State
- NFL draft: 2012: undrafted

Career history
- Buffalo Bills (2012)*; Indianapolis Colts (2012)*; Pittsburgh Steelers (2012–2013); Toronto Argonauts (2014–2016)
- * Offseason or practice squad member only

Career NFL statistics
- Games played: 3
- Games started: 0
- Stats at Pro Football Reference
- Stats at CFL.ca (archive)

Isaiah Jerome Green (born August 10, 1989) is an American former professional gridiron football cornerback. After playing college football for Fresno State, he was signed by the Buffalo Bills as an undrafted free agent in 2012.

== Early life ==
Green attended Long Beach Polytechnic High School. Green participated in the 2005 World Youth Championships in Africa, anchored the 4x100-meter relay team that won a Gold medal and was on the national high school record-setting 4x200 relay team.

== College career ==
Green redshirted in 2007. Green recorded two tackles during the 2008 season. He made his first career start in the 2009 New Mexico Bowl. Green made five starts in 2010 and ten starts in 2011. He finished his college career with 46 games played, 16 starts, 94 tackles, one forced fumble and one interception.

== Professional career ==
After going undrafted in the 2012 NFL draft, Green signed with the Buffalo Bills as a free agent. After being released by the Bills, the Indianapolis Colts signed Green to their practice squad on October 9, 2012. The Colts released Green on December 4. The Pittsburgh Steelers signed Green to their practice squad on December 12. He was released by the Steelers on August 30, 2014.

On October 14, 2014, Green signed a practice roster agreement with the Toronto Argonauts of the Canadian Football League. In one game with the Argonauts, Green recorded one defensive tackle & two special teams tackles. Green was released by the Argonauts on June 5, 2015.
