= Jamie McCoy =

American football player (born 1987)

No. 82
- Position: Tight end / Fullback

Personal information
- Born: July 21, 1987 (age 39); Midland, Texas, U.S.
- Listed height: 6 ft 3 in (1.91 m)
- Listed weight: 240 lb (109 kg)

Career information
- High school: Midland (TX) Lee
- College: Texas A&M
- NFL draft: 2010: undrafted

Career history
- St. Louis Rams (2010)*; Pittsburgh Steelers (2011–2012)*; San Diego Chargers (2012)*; Pittsburgh Steelers (2012)
- * Offseason or practice squad member only
- Stats at Pro Football Reference

Jamie McCoy (born July 21, 1987) is an American former football tight end and fullback.

== College career ==
He played college football at Texas A&M.

== Professional career ==
=== St. Louis Rams ===
On April 25, 2010, he was signed with the St. Louis Rams as an undrafted free agent. He was released on August 29, 2010.

=== Pittsburgh Steelers ===
In 2011, he signed with Pittsburgh Steelers.

=== San Diego Chargers ===
On December 26, 2012, McCoy signed with the San Diego Chargers.
