= 2009 Pittsburgh Steelers season =

77th season in franchise history

- Owner: The Rooney Family
- General manager: Kevin Colbert
- Head coach: Mike Tomlin
- Offensive coordinator: Bruce Arians
- Defensive coordinator: Dick LeBeau
- Home stadium: Heinz Field

Results
- Record: 9–7
- Division place: 3rd AFC North
- Playoffs: Did not qualify
- All-Pros: Lamar Woodley (2nd team); James Harrison (2nd team)
- Pro Bowlers: NT Casey Hampton; OLB James Harrison; TE Heath Miller; OLB Lamar Woodley
- Team MVP: Ben Roethlisberger
- Team ROY: Mike Wallace

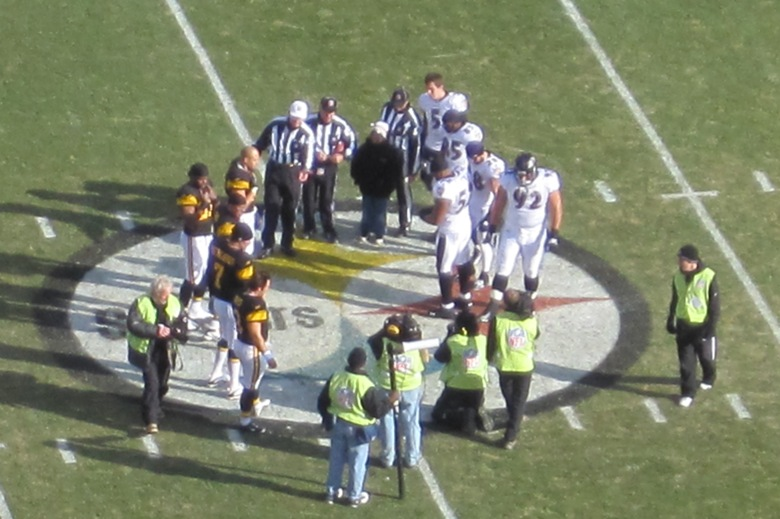
Coinflip between the Steelers and the Ravens in 2009

The 2009 Pittsburgh Steelers season was the franchise's 77th season in the National Football League (NFL). They were coming off a season in which they compiled a 12–4 regular season record and capped the season by winning the franchise's record sixth Super Bowl. The team's coaching staff remained the same for the third consecutive year.

As the defending champions, the Steelers opened the season by hosting the NFL Kickoff game on Thursday, September 10, 2009, which was an overtime victory against the Tennessee Titans. The team compiled a 6–2 record over the season's first half, but then began a five-game losing streak which included losses to all three division opponents. Three late wins led to a 9–7 record, but the team failed to qualify for the playoffs for the first time since 2006. This was the third straight time the team had missed the playoffs following a Super Bowl victory, 1980 and 2006 being the previous two.

== Off season activity ==
The front office's major goals coming into the off-season were to retain the bulk of the team's own free agents and to look to add talent primarily through the draft rather than free agent acquisitions. This has been the team's primary philosophy since Chuck Noll took over as head coach in 1969. The other major item on the team's agenda was to extend the contracts of a few of the players who were coming into the final year of their contracts – chief among these were linebacker and 2008 NFL Defensive Player of the Year, James Harrison, tight end Heath Miller, and tackle Max Starks.

Management completed the highest-priority item on its off-season checklist by reaching agreement with Harrison on a six-year, $51.175 million contract, which includes $20 million in guaranteed money. The team was also successful in extending the contracts of Starks (four years, $26.3 million) and Miller (six years, $35.3 million) both of whom were potential free agents after the season. Additionally, contract extension were completed with receiver Hines Ward (five years, $22.1 million), guard Chris Kemoeatu (five years, $20 million), center Justin Hartwig (four years, $10 million) and defensive end Brett Keisel (five years, $18.885 million).

The team's primary needs coming into the 2009 season were considered to be shoring up the offensive line and improving performance on special teams, primarily at kick returner. In addition, they were forced to address the loss through free agency of two key contributors: starting cornerback Bryant McFadden and number three wide receiver Nate Washington. The front office and coaching staff also had to focus on uncovering for eventual replacements for some aging cogs: defensive end Aaron Smith and cornerback Deshea Townsend, who were 33 and 34 respectively at the start of the season. ESPN's Matt Williamson ranked the team's pre-draft needs as (in order), defensive end, offensive tackle, wide receiver and cornerback.

=== Free agents signed ===
Players from the 2008 team who signed new contracts with the Steelers:

- OT Max Starks – signed $26.3 million, four-year contract,
- G Chris Kemoeatu – signed five year, $20+ million contract
- OT Willie Colon – signed one year, $2.198 million restricted free agent tender
- OT Trai Essex – signed two year, $1.92 million contract
- LB Keyaron Fox – signed two year, $1.8 million contract
- FB/TE Sean McHugh – signed three year, $2.57 million contract, expected to be starting FB – placed on Injured Reserve on September 5, 2009
- QB Charlie Batch – signed one year, $795,000 contract
- LB Andre Frazier – signed two year, $1.375 million contract
- FB Carey Davis – signed exclusive rights free agent tender, which amounts to a one-year, $460,000 contract
- LB Arnold Harrison – signed one year, $460,000 contract

Players not with the 2008 team who were signed for 2009

- CB Keiwan Ratliff – from Indianapolis Colts; Ike Taylor's contract was restructured to clear cap space
- RB Stefan Logan – from CFL's BC Lions
- WR Shaun McDonald – spent 2007 & 2008 with Detroit Lions

Players who signed with the team in 2009, but did not make the 53-man roster

- K Piotr Czech – attended training camp with the Baltimore Ravens in 2008 – released on September 5, 2009, in final cut-down to 53-man roster
- WR Martin Nance – 2008 Steelers practice squad player; signed two year, $705,000 contract – released on August 31, 2009, in cut-down to 75-man roster
- P Dirk Johnson – released by the Washington Redskins in 2009 – released June 12, 2009
- FB Ryan Powdrell – spent a week on the Bucs practice squad in 2008 – released June 18, 2009
- WR/KR Jayson Foster – spent 2008 on Steelers' and Denver Broncos' practice squads – released June 18, 2009
- WR Brandon Williams – released by Rams prior to 2008 season – released on September 5, 2009, in final cut-down to 53-man roster

=== Practice squad players ===
2008 practice squad players who made the 2009 53-man roster:

- C Doug Legursky – 2008 Steelers practice squad player
- S Ryan Mundy – 2008 Steelers practice squad player, signed reserve/futures contract

2008 practice squad players who signed new reserve contracts, but did not make the final 53-man roster:

- DE Jordan Reffett – 2008 Steelers practice squad player, signed reserve/futures contract
- RB Justin Vincent – 2008 Steelers practice squad player, signed reserve/futures contract – released on September 5, 2009, in final cut-down to 53-man roster
- TE Dezmond Sherrod – 2008 Steelers practice squad player, signed reserve/futures contract – released on September 5, 2009, in final cut-down to 53-man roster
- CB Roy Lewis – 2008 Steelers practice squad player, signed reserve/futures contract – released on September 5, 2009, in final cut-down to 53-man roster
- WR Dallas Baker – 2008 Steelers practice squad player, signed reserve/futures contract – released on September 5, 2009, in final cut-down to 53-man roster
- LB Donovan Woods – 2008 Steelers practice squad player, signed reserve/futures contract – released on September 5, 2009, in final cut-down to 53-man roster

=== Players lost ===
- OG Kendall Simmons – released; 2002 first round pick; ended 2008 season on IR
- LB Mike Humpal – released; 2008 sixth round pick; ended 2008 on IR
- WR Nate Washington – 2005 undrafted free agent; signed with the Tennessee Titans as an unrestricted free agent
- FS Anthony Smith – 2006 3rd round pick; signed with Green Bay Packers as an unrestricted free agent
- CB Bryant McFadden – 2005 2nd round pick; signed with the Arizona Cardinals as an unrestricted free agent
- OT Marvel Smith – 2000 2nd round pick who started 108 games as a Steeler; signed with San Francisco 49ers
- QB Byron Leftwich – Steelers 2008 back-up QB; signed with Tampa Bay Buccaneers
- RB Gary Russell – released; 2007 undrafted rookie free agent, scored first touchdown of Super Bowl XLIII; signed with Oakland Raiders.
- LB Larry Foote – released; 2002 2nd round pick who started 83 games as a Steeler, including all 80 over the past five seasons; signed with Detroit Lions.
- LS Jared Retkofsky – released; signed last season when veteran long snapper Greg Warren tore his ACL
- CB Fernando Bryant – signed one year, $745,000 contract – Retired June 23, 2009
- OT Jeremy Parquet (exclusive rights free agent) – released on September 5, 2009, in final cut-down to 53-man roster
- P Mitch Berger – made superfluous by return from injury of Daniel Sepulveda
- TE Jonathan Dekker – not invited to training camp
- DE Orpheus Roye – not invited to training camp
- CB Anthony Madison signed one year, $1.01 million restricted free agent tender – released on September 5, 2009, in final cut-down to 53-man roster

== 2009 NFL draft ==
The 2009 NFL draft was held on April 25 and 26, 2009, at Radio City Music Hall in New York City. In addition to their own draft picks, the team also had the Tampa Bay Buccaneers seventh-round selection (#226 overall) which they received in a trade prior to the 2008 season for offensive lineman Sean Mahan and a compensatory pick at the end of the 5th round.

During the draft, the Steelers traded their second-round (#64 overall) and fourth-round (#132) picks to the Denver Broncos in exchange for Denver's third-round (#79) and Chicago's third-round (#84) picks.

2009 Pittsburgh Steelers draft selections
Round	Pick #	Player	Position	Height	Weight	College	Status
1	32	Ziggy Hood	Defensive tackle	6 ft 3 in (1.91 m)	300 lb (140 kg)	Missouri	Made 53-man roster at start of 2009 season
3	79	Kraig Urbik	Offensive guard	6 ft 6 in (1.98 m)	332 lb (151 kg)	Wisconsin	Made 53-man roster at start of 2009 season
3	84	Mike Wallace	Wide receiver	6 ft 0 in (1.83 m)	180 lb (82 kg)	Mississippi	Made 53-man roster at start of 2009 season
3	96	Keenan Lewis	Cornerback	6 ft 1 in (1.85 m)	196 lb (89 kg)	Oregon State	Made 53-man roster at start of 2009 season
5	168	Joe Burnett	Cornerback	5 ft 9 in (1.75 m)	198 lb (90 kg)	Central Florida	Made 53-man roster at start of 2009 season
5	169	Frank Summers	Running back	5 ft 10 in (1.78 m)	230 lb (100 kg)	UNLV	Made 53-man roster at start of 2009 season
6	205	Ra'Shon Harris	Defensive tackle	6 ft 4 in (1.93 m)	298 lb (135 kg)	Oregon	Released by Steelers at final cut-down – claimed by Carolina Panthers – later re-signed by Pittsburgh
7	226	A.Q. Shipley	Center	6 ft 1 in (1.85 m)	304 lb (138 kg)	Penn State	Signed to Practice Squad at start of 2009 season
7	241	David Johnson	Tight end	6 ft 1 in (1.85 m)	260 lb (120 kg)	Arkansas State	Made 53-man roster at start of 2009 season

2009 Pittsburgh Steelers undrafted free agents
Player	Position	Height	Weight	College
Mark Estermyer	Long snapper	6 ft 1 in (1.85 m)	251 lb (114 kg)	Pitt
Tom Korte	Linebacker	6 ft 0 in (1.83 m)	235 lb (107 kg)	Hillsdale College
Ramon Foster	Guard	6 ft 5 in (1.96 m)	328 lb (149 kg)	Tennessee
Mike Reilly	Quarterback	6 ft 3 in (1.91 m)	214 lb (97 kg)	Central Washington
Tyler Grisham	Wide receiver	5 ft 11 in (1.80 m)	180 lb (82 kg)	Clemson
Derrick Richardson	Strong Safety	5 ft 10 in (1.78 m)	184 lb (83 kg)	New Mexico State
Kevin McCabe	Quarterback	6 ft 2 in (1.88 m)	209 lb (95 kg)	California (Pa.)
Andy Schantz	Linebacker	6 ft 1 in (1.85 m)	234 lb (106 kg)	Portland State
Demiko Goodman	Wide receiver	6 ft 2 in (1.88 m)	189 lb (86 kg)	Georgia
Steven Black	Wide receiver	6 ft 2 in (1.88 m)	202 lb (92 kg)	Memphis
Jeff Bradley	Defensive tackle	6 ft 3 in (1.91 m)	280 lb (130 kg)	Western Carolina
Steve McLendon	Defensive tackle	6 ft 3 in (1.91 m)	305 lb (138 kg)	Troy
Isaac Redman	Running back	5 ft 10 in (1.78 m)	228 lb (103 kg)	Bowie State

== Personnel ==
=== Staff ===
2009 Pittsburgh Steelers staff
Front office: Chairman emeritus – Daniel M. Rooney; President – Arthur J. Rooney II; Vice president – Arthur J. Rooney, Jr.; Administration advisor – Chuck Noll; Administrative assistant – Diane Lowe; Business office; Director of business – Mark Hart; Controller – Bob Tyler; Business administration – Dan Ferens; Human relations/office coordinator – Geraldine Glenn; Business & football administration coordinator – Omar Khan; Assistant controller – Jodie Spagnolli; Administrative assistant – Rebecca Mihalcik; Administrative assistant – Colleen Kimmel; Administrative assistant – Kelly Serafin; Media relations; Communications coordinator – Dave Lockett; Public relations/media manager – Burt Lauten; Administrative assistant – Emily Scerba; Intern – Jason Seidling; Community relations; Community relations manager – Michele Rosenthal; Administrative assistant – Stacie Lawrence; Photography; Team photographer – Mike Fabus; Information technology; Information technology manager – Scott Phelps; IT/network support technician – Jon Pugliano; Steelers.com/Steelers Digest; Editor – Bob Labriola; Assistant editor/website – Teresa Varley; Football operations; Director of football operations – Kevin Colbert; Pro personnel coordinator – Doug Whaley; College scouting coordinator – Ron Hughes; Special assistant/pro and college personnel – Joe Greene; Pro/college scout – Phil Kreidler; College scout – Mark Gorscak; College scout – Kelvin Fisher; College scout – Bruce McNorton; College scout – Dan Rooney; BLESTO scout – David Petett; College personnel – Bill Nunn; Administrative assistant – Maureen Mannion; Administrative assistant – Karen Mercalde; Head coaches: Head coach – Mike Tomlin; Assistant head coach/defensive line – John Mitchell; Offensive coaches: Offensive coordinator – Bruce Arians; Quarterbacks – Ken Anderson; Running backs – Kirby Wilson; Wide receivers – Randy Fichtner; Tight ends – James Daniel; Offensive line – Larry Zierlein; Offensive quality control/asst. ol – Harold Goodwin	Defensive coaches: Defensive coordinator – Dick LeBeau; Linebackers – Keith Butler; Defensive backs – Ray Horton; Defensive quality control – Lou Spanos; Special teams coaches: Special teams – Bob Ligashesky; Assistant special teams – Amos Jones; Strength and conditioning: Conditioning coach – Garrett Giemont; Conditioning assistant – Marcel Pastoor; Player development – Raymond Jackson; Administrative assistant – Chrissy Bulger; Administrative assistant – Mia Daudet; Medical staff; Physician, internal medicine – Dr. Mark Duca; Physician, internal medicine – Dr. Tony Yates; Physician, neurosurgery – Dr. Joseph Maroon; Physician, orthopedic surgery – Dr. James P. Bradley; Athletic training staff; Head athletic trainer – John Norwig; Assistant athletic trainer – Ryan Grove; Assistant athletic trainer – Ariko Iso; Football equipment staff; Equipment manager - Rodgers Freyvogel; Field manager – Rich Baker; Video; Video coordinator – Bob McCartney; Video assistant – Andy Lizanich; Video assistant – Jason McMann

=== Training camp ===
Pittsburgh Steelers 2009 training camp roster
Quarterbacks: 16 Charlie Batch; 2 Dennis Dixon; 7 Ben Roethlisberger; 13 Mike Reilly; Kevin McCabe; Running backs: 38 Carey Davis FB; 11 Stefan Logan RS; 34 Rashard Mendenhall; 21 Mewelde Moore; 39 Willie Parker; 35 Ryan Powdrell FB; 44 Frank Summers; 33 Isaac Redman; 28 Justin Vincent; Wide receivers: 81 Dallas Baker; 19 Tyler Grisham; 10 Santonio Holmes; 87 Shaun McDonald; 14 Limas Sweed; 17 Mike Wallace; 86 Hines Ward; 82 Brandon Williams; Steven Black; Jayson Foster; Cedric Goodman; Martin Nance; Tight ends: 85 David Johnson; 49 Sean McHugh; 83 Heath Miller; 89 Matt Spaeth; Dezmond Sherrod	Offensive linemen: 69 Jason Capizzi T; 74 Willie Colon T; 79 Trai Essex T; 73 Ramon Foster G; 62 Justin Hartwig C; 66 Tony Hills T; 68 Chris Kemoeatu G; 64 Doug Legursky C; 77 Jeremy Parquet T; 61 A.Q. Shipley C; 72 Darnell Stapleton G; 78 Max Starks T; 65 Kraig Urbik G; Defensive linemen: 93 Nick Eason DE; 98 Casey Hampton NT; 77 Ra'Shon Harris DE; 76 Chris Hoke NT; 96 Ziggy Hood DE; 99 Brett Keisel DE; 90 Travis Kirschke DE; 69 Steve McLendon NT; 71 Scott Paxson NT; 91 Aaron Smith DE; Jeff Bradley DE; Jordan Reffett DE	Linebackers: 55 Patrick Bailey OLB; 53 Bruce Davis OLB; 51 James Farrior ILB; 57 Keyaron Fox ILB; 54 Andre Frazier OLB; 97 Arnold Harrison OLB; 92 James Harrison OLB; 94 Lawrence Timmons ILB; 56 LaMarr Woodley OLB; 95 Donovan Woods; Tom Korte; Andy Schantz; Defensive backs: 31 Fernando Bryant CB; 27 Joe Burnett CB; 23 Tyrone Carter S; 25 Ryan Clark FS; 22 William Gay CB; 20 Keenan Lewis CB; 30 Roy Lewis CB; 37 Anthony Madison CB; 29 Ryan Mundy S; 43 Troy Polamalu SS; 27 Keiwan Ratliff CB; 24 Ike Taylor CB; 26 Deshea Townsend CB; Derrick Richardson S; Special teams: 48 Mark Estermyer LS; 6 Dirk Johnson P; 3 Jeff Reed K; 9 Daniel Sepulveda P; 60 Greg Warren LS; Piotr Czech K

=== Roster ===
2009 Pittsburgh Steelers roster
Quarterbacks (QB): 16 Charlie Batch; 2 Dennis Dixon; 7 Ben Roethlisberger; Running backs (RB): 38 Carey Davis FB; 34 Rashard Mendenhall; 21 Mewelde Moore; 39 Willie Parker; Wide receivers (WR): 84 Joey Galloway; 19 Tyler Grisham; 10 Santonio Holmes; 11 Stefan Logan; 17 Mike Wallace; 86 Hines Ward; Tight ends (TE): 85 David Johnson; 83 Heath Miller; 89 Matt Spaeth	Offensive linemen (OL): 74 Willie Colon T; 79 Trai Essex G; 73 Ramon Foster G/T; 62 Justin Hartwig C; 66 Tony Hills T; 68 Chris Kemoeatu G; 64 Doug Legursky C; 78 Max Starks T; 65 Kraig Urbik G; Defensive linemen (DL): 93 Nick Eason DE; 98 Casey Hampton NT; 77 Ra'Shon Harris NT; 76 Chris Hoke NT; 96 Ziggy Hood DE; 99 Brett Keisel DE; 90 Travis Kirschke DE	Linebackers (LB): 55 Patrick Bailey OLB; 50 Rocky Boiman ILB; 51 James Farrior ILB; 57 Keyaron Fox ILB; 54 Andre Frazier OLB; 92 James Harrison OLB; 94 Lawrence Timmons ILB; 56 LaMarr Woodley OLB; Defensive backs (DB): 27 Joe Burnett CB; 23 Tyrone Carter SS; 25 Ryan Clark FS; 22 William Gay CB; 37 Anthony Madison CB; 29 Ryan Mundy FS; 43 Troy Polamalu SS; 24 Ike Taylor CB; 26 Deshea Townsend CB; 35 Trae Williams CB; Special teams (ST): 3 Jeff Reed K; 61 Jared Retkofsky LS; 9 Daniel Sepulveda P	Practice squad: 87 Eugene Bright TE; 13 Jason Chery WR; 31 Tuff Harris S; 69 Steve McLendon NT; 33 Isaac Redman RB; 71 A. Q. Shipley C; 28 Justin Vincent RB; 53 Johnny Williams LB; Reserve: 20 Keenan Lewis CB (IR); 49 Sean McHugh TE (IR); 91 Aaron Smith DE (IR); 72 Darnell Stapleton G (IR); 44 Frank Summers FB (IR); 14 Limas Sweed WR; 60 Greg Warren LS (IR); Rookies in italics 53 active, 7 reserve, 8 practice squad

== Schedule ==
=== Preseason ===
The Steelers opened their preseason schedule on August 13 with a re-match of Super Bowl XLIII against the Arizona Cardinals on Monday Night Football.

Week	Date	Opponent	Result	Record	Game site	NFL.com recap
1	August 13	Arizona Cardinals	**W** 20–10	1–0	Heinz Field	Recap
2	August 22	at Washington Redskins	**L** 13–17	1–1	FedExField	Recap
3	August 29	Buffalo Bills	**W** 17–0	2–1	Heinz Field	Recap
4	September 3	at Carolina Panthers	**W** 21–10	3–1	Bank of America Stadium	Recap

=== Regular season ===
The Steelers' opponents for the 2009 season are based on the NFL's predetermined scheduling formula. The combined 2008 record of the Steelers' 2009 opponents was 110–144–2 (.434 winning percentage). By this measure the Steelers have the fourth easiest schedule in the league – only the Packers, Vikings and Bears opponents have a worse cumulative 2008 winning percentage. The Packers, Vikings and Bears play two games each against the Lions, who finished 0–16 in 2008.

As the defending Super Bowl champion, the Steelers hosted the kickoff game for the 2009 season on Thursday, September 10, at 8:30 p.m. EDT. Their opponent for the kickoff game was the Tennessee Titans.

The Pittsburgh Steelers won the first game of the 2009 season in overtime over the Tennessee Titans on September 10, 2009 at 11:48 pm EDT with a field goal.

Week	Date	Opponent	Result	Record	Game site	NFL.com recap
1	September 10	Tennessee Titans	**W** 13–10 (OT)	1–0	Heinz Field	Summary
2	September 20	at Chicago Bears	**L** 14–17	1–1	Soldier Field	Summary
3	September 27	at **Cincinnati Bengals**	**L** 20–23	1–2	Paul Brown Stadium	Summary
4	October 4	San Diego Chargers	**W** 38–28	2–2	Heinz Field	Summary
5	October 11	at Detroit Lions	**W** 28–20	3–2	Ford Field	Summary
6	October 18	**Cleveland Browns**	**W** 27–14	4–2	Heinz Field	Summary
7	October 25	Minnesota Vikings	**W** 27–17	5–2	Heinz Field	Summary
8	Bye					
9	November 9	at Denver Broncos	**W** 28–10	6–2	Invesco Field at Mile High	Summary
10	November 15	**Cincinnati Bengals**	**L** 12–18	6–3	Heinz Field	Summary
11	November 22	at Kansas City Chiefs	**L** 24–27 (OT)	6–4	Arrowhead Stadium	Summary
12	November 29	at **Baltimore Ravens**	**L** 17–20 (OT)	6–5	M&T Bank Stadium	Summary
13	December 6	Oakland Raiders	**L** 24–27	6–6	Heinz Field	Summary
14	December 10	at **Cleveland Browns**	**L** 6–13	6–7	Cleveland Browns Stadium	Summary
15	December 20	Green Bay Packers	**W** 37–36	7–7	Heinz Field	Summary
16	December 27	**Baltimore Ravens**	**W** 23–20	8–7	Heinz Field	Summary
17	January 3	at Miami Dolphins	**W** 30–24	9–7	Land Shark Stadium	Summary

Note: Intra-divisional opponents are in bold text.

== Standings ==
The 2009 season was the Steelers' eighth as members of the AFC North Division.

AFC North
	W	L	T	PCT	DIV	CONF	PF	PA	STK
^{(4)} Cincinnati Bengals	10	6	0	.625	6–0	7–5	305	291	L1
^{(6)} Baltimore Ravens	9	7	0	.563	3–3	7–5	391	261	W1
Pittsburgh Steelers	9	7	0	.563	2–4	6–6	368	324	W3
Cleveland Browns	5	11	0	.313	1–5	5–7	245	375	W4

== Preseason results ==
=== Week 1: vs. Arizona Cardinals ===
Quarter	1	2	3	4	Total
Cardinals	0	3	0	7	10
Steelers	0	3	0	17	20

at Heinz Field, Pittsburgh, Pennsylvania

- Date: August 13
- Game time: 8:00 p.m. EDT
- Game attendance: 58,330

Game information
- Top passer: Dennis Dixon (PIT): 112 yds
- Top rusher: Isaac Redman (PIT): 32 yds
- Top receiver: Shaun McDonald (PIT): 69 yds

=== Week 2: at Washington Redskins ===
Quarter	1	2	3	4	Total
Steelers	7	3	3	0	13
Redskins	3	0	7	7	17

at FedExField, Landover, Maryland

- Date: August 22
- Game time: 7:30 p.m. EDT
- Game attendance: 68,243

Game information
- Top passer: Dennis Dixon (PIT), 68 yds
- Top rusher: Marcus Mason (WAS), 45 yds
- Top receiver: Fred Davis (WAS), 31 yds

=== Week 3: vs. Buffalo Bills ===
Quarter	1	2	3	4	Total
Bills	0	0	0	0	0
Steelers	0	17	0	0	17

at Heinz Field, Pittsburgh, Pennsylvania

- Date: August 29
- Game time: 7:30 p.m. EDT
- Game attendance: 57,942

Game information
- Top passer: Ben Roethlisberger (PIT), 168 yds
- Top rusher: Rashard Mendenhall (PIT), 48 yds
- Top receiver: Hines Ward (PIT), 74 yds

=== Week 4: at Carolina Panthers ===
Quarter	1	2	3	4	Total
Steelers	14	0	7	0	21
Panthers	0	0	7	3	10

at Bank of America Stadium, Charlotte, North Carolina

- Date: September 3
- Game time: 8:00 p.m. EDT
- Game attendance: 70,073

Game information
- Top passer: Matt Moore (CAR), 89 yds
- Top rusher: Isaac Redman (PIT), 79 yds
- Top receiver: Kenny Moore (CAR), 59 yds

== Regular season results ==
=== Week 1: vs. Tennessee Titans ===
NFL Kickoff game

Quarter	1	2	3	4	OT	Total
Titans	0	7	0	3	0	10
Steelers	0	7	0	3	3	13

at Heinz Field, Pittsburgh, Pennsylvania

- Game time: 8:30 p.m. EDT
- Game weather: 63 °F (17 °C) (Clear)
- Game attendance: 65,110
- Referee: Bill Leavy
- TV announcers (NBC): Al Michaels, Cris Collinsworth, & Andrea Kremer

With their Super Bowl title to defend, the Steelers began their season at home in the annual kickoff game against the Tennessee Titans. After a scoreless first quarter, Pittsburgh got their first score of the season as quarterback Ben Roethlisberger completed a 34-yard touchdown pass to Super Bowl XLIII MVP wide receiver Santonio Holmes near the end of the second quarter. The Titans responded with quarterback Kerry Collins completing a 14-yard touchdown pass to wide receiver Justin Gage. Just prior to halftime, pro-bowl safety Troy Polamalu went to the locker room after suffering a knee injury. He did not return to the field, and it would later be revealed that he had strained his MCL.

After a scoreless third quarter, Tennessee took the lead in the fourth quarter as kicker Rob Bironas got a 45-yard field goal. Pittsburgh tied the game as kicker Jeff Reed made a 32-yard field goal. With time running out, the Steelers drove down the field again, and lost the ball to a rare Hines Ward fumble, allowing the Titans to run the game into overtime.

In overtime, the Steelers won the cointoss and never relinquished the ball. In the end, Pittsburgh emerged victorious as Reed nailed the game-winning 33-yard field goal.

With the win, the Steelers began their season at 1–0.

This also marked the first time that the Steelers were able to win against Collins.

=== Week 2: at Chicago Bears ===
Quarter	1	2	3	4	Total
Steelers	7	0	7	0	14
Bears	0	7	0	10	17

at Soldier Field, Chicago, Illinois

- Game time: 4:15 p.m. EDT
- Game weather: 70 °F (21 °C) (Light Rain)
- Game attendance: 62,231
- Referee: Scott Green
- TV announcers (CBS): Jim Nantz & Phil Simms

Coming off their season-opening win over the Titans, the Steelers flew to Soldier Field for a Week 2 interconference duel with the Chicago Bears. In the first quarter, Pittsburgh struck first as quarterback Ben Roethlisberger completed a 1-yard touchdown pass to tight end Matt Spaeth. However, in the second quarter, the Bears answered with quarterback Jay Cutler completing a 6-yard touchdown pass to tight end Kellen Davis.

Pittsburgh regained their lead in the third quarter as Roethlisberger got a 2-yard touchdown run, but in the fourth quarter, two missed field goals from kicker Jeff Reed led to Cutler's 7-yard touchdown pass to wide receiver Johnny Knox and kicker Robbie Gould's 44-yard field goal.

With the loss, the Steelers fell to 1–1.

=== Week 3: at Cincinnati Bengals ===
Quarter	1	2	3	4	Total
Steelers	10	3	7	0	20
Bengals	0	3	6	14	23

at Paul Brown Stadium, Cincinnati, Ohio

- Game time: 4:15 p.m. EDT
- Game weather: 65 °F (18 °C) (mostly cloudy)
- Game attendance: 64,538
- Referee: Gene Steratore
- TV announcers (CBS): Jim Nantz & Phil Simms

Following a tough road loss against the Bears, the Steelers flew to Paul Brown Stadium for a Week 3 AFC North duel with the Cincinnati Bengals. Pittsburgh struck first in the first quarter with kicker Jeff Reed's 19-yard field goal and quarterback Ben Roethlisberger's 27-yard touchdown pass to running back Willie Parker. The Steelers added on to their lead in the second quarter as Reed made a 34-yard field goal. The Bengals closed out the half with kicker Shayne Graham's 34-yard field goal.

Cincinnati crept closer in the third quarter as cornerback Johnathan Joseph returned an interception 30 yards for a touchdown (with a failed PAT), yet Pittsburgh answered with Roethlisberger's 1-yard touchdown run. However, in the fourth quarter, the Bengals took the lead with running back Cedric Benson's 23-yard touchdown run (with a failed 2-point conversion) and quarterback Carson Palmer's 4-yard touchdown pass to wide receiver Andre Caldwell (with a successful 2-point conversion pass to running back Brian Leonard). The Steelers tried to rally, but Roethlisberger's last-second hail mary pass was incomplete, preserving the defeat.

With the loss, Pittsburgh fell to 1–2 and 3rd place in the AFC North. This also became the team's first 1–2 start since 2006.

Wide receiver Hines Ward (4 receptions, 82 yards) became the 21st player in NFL history to surpass 800 career receptions and 10,000 receiving yards.

=== Week 4: vs. San Diego Chargers ===
Quarter	1	2	3	4	Total
Chargers	0	0	7	21	28
Steelers	14	7	7	10	38

at Heinz Field, Pittsburgh, Pennsylvania

- Game time: 8:20 p.m. EDT
- Game weather: 53 °F (12 °C) (cloudy)
- Game attendance: 64,045
- Referee: Jeff Triplette
- TV announcers (NBC): Al Michaels, Cris Collinsworth, & Andrea Kremer

Hoping to snap a two-game losing skid, the Steelers went home, donned their throwback uniforms, and prepared for a Week 4 Sunday night duel with the San Diego Chargers. Pittsburgh got off to a fast start in the opening half with running back Rashard Mendenhall (filling in for the injured Willie Parker) helping out the cause on a 1-yard touchdown run in the first quarter, followed by quarterback Ben Roethlisberger's 19-yard touchdown pass to running back Mewelde Moore. The Steelers carried their fast start into the second quarter as Mendenhall got a 2-yard touchdown run.

In the third quarter, Pittsburgh picked up where they left off, with Roethlisberger completing a 6-yard touchdown pass to tight end Heath Miller. The Chargers got on the board with quarterback Philip Rivers' 3-yard touchdown pass to tight end Antonio Gates. In the fourth quarter, San Diego began to play catch-up with a special teams play. Fullback Jacob Hester stripped return specialist Stefan Logan of the ball and went 41 yards for a touchdown. The Steelers came right back with a trick play, as Moore completed a 6-yard touchdown pass to Miller. However, the Chargers slashed away at the Steelers' lead, with Rivers completing a 30-yard touchdown pass to Gates and a 13-yard touchdown pass to wide receiver Chris Chambers. Pittsburgh answered the call with kicker Jeff Reed booting a 46-yard field goal, followed by linebacker James Harrison causing a sack and a fumble. This allowed linebacker James Farrior to recover the fumble and secure the victory.

With the win, not only did the Steelers improve to 2–2, but they also extended their regular-season home-game winning streak over San Diego to 13-straight.

Mendenhall had a career night, with 29 carries for 165 yards, in addition to his two rushing touchdowns.

=== Week 5: at Detroit Lions ===
Quarter	1	2	3	4	Total
Steelers	7	14	7	0	28
Lions	6	7	0	7	20

at Ford Field, Detroit, Michigan

- Game time: 1:00 p.m. EDT
- Game weather: None (Domed Stadium)
- Game attendance: 59,333
- Referee: Ed Hochuli
- TV announcers (CBS): Dick Enberg & Dan Fouts

Following a close victory over the Chargers, the Steelers traveled to Ford Field for a Week 5 interconference duel with the 1–3 Detroit Lions. Despite the Lions getting the opening score of the first quarter with a 46-yard field goal from kicker Jason Hanson, Pittsburgh answered with running back Rashard Mendenhall's 7-yard touchdown run. Afterwards, Detroit closed out the opening period with Hanson making another 46-yard field goal. In the second quarter, the Steelers delivered a big strike with quarterback Ben Roethlisberger completing a 15-yard touchdown pass to tight end Heath Miller. Even though the Lions came right back with cornerback Williams James returning an interception 38 yards for a touchdown, Pittsburgh effectively replied with Roethlisberger's 17-yard touchdown pass to wide receiver Hines Ward.

In the third quarter, the Steelers added on to their lead as Roethlisberger threw to rookie wide receiver Mike Wallace on a 47-yard touchdown pass. Detroit tried to rally in the fourth quarter as quarterback Daunte Culpepper found wide receiver Dennis Northcutt on a 25-yard touchdown pass, but Pittsburgh's defense made a crucial stand with three-straight sacks (courtesy of linebacker LaMarr Woodley, cornerback William Gay, and linebacker Lawrence Timmons), followed by cornerback Ike Taylor swatting away the Lions' last hope from a hail-mary pass.

With the win, the Steelers improved to 3–2.

=== Week 6: vs. Cleveland Browns ===
Quarter	1	2	3	4	Total
Browns	0	7	7	0	14
Steelers	0	17	7	3	27

at Heinz Field, Pittsburgh, Pennsylvania

- Game time: 1:00 p.m. EDT
- Game weather: 45 °F (7 °C) (cloudy)
- Game attendance: 64,398
- Referee: Walt Anderson
- TV announcers (CBS): Kevin Harlan & Solomon Wilcots

Coming off their road win over the Lions, the Steelers went home for a divisional match with the Cleveland Browns. After a scoreless first quarter, Pittsburgh came out striking in the second quarter as quarterback Ben Roethlisberger completed an 8-yard touchdown pass to tight end Heath Miller and a 52-yard touchdown pass to wide receiver Hines Ward. The Browns immediately struck back as wide receiver Joshua Cribbs returned a kickoff 98 yards for a touchdown. Pittsburgh closed out the half with a 32-yard field goal from kicker Jeff Reed.

Cleveland tried to catch up as quarterback Derek Anderson completed a 1-yard touchdown pass to fullback Lawrence Vickers, yet the Steelers answered with a 2-yard touchdown run from running back Rashard Mendenhall. Pittsburgh closed the game out in the fourth quarter with Reed kicking a 39-yard field goal.

With their 12th-straight win over the Browns, the Steelers improved to 4–2. With the Ravens' loss to the Vikings, and the Bengals' loss to the Texans that same week, the Steelers were now tied with the Bengals at the top of the AFC North.

=== Week 7: vs. Minnesota Vikings ===
Quarter	1	2	3	4	Total
Vikings	0	7	3	7	17
Steelers	3	7	3	14	27

at Heinz Field, Pittsburgh, Pennsylvania

- Game time: 1:00 p.m. EDT
- Game weather: 55 °F (13 °C) (sunny)
- Game attendance: 65,597
- Referee: Ron Winter
- TV announcers (Fox): Kenny Albert, Daryl Johnston, and Tony Siragusa

Coming off their divisional win over the Browns, the Steelers stayed at home for a Week 7 interconference duel with the 6–0 Minnesota Vikings. Pittsburgh got the game's opening score late in the first quarter with kicker Jeff Reed nailing a 39-yard field goal. The Vikings answered in the second quarter with a 2-yard touchdown run from running back Adrian Peterson, yet the Steelers struck back with Ben Roethlisberger completing a 40-yard touchdown pass to rookie wide receiver Mike Wallace.

Both teams swapped field goals in the third quarter, with Reed booting a 27-yard field goal and Vikings kicker Ryan Longwell making an 18-yard field goal. In the fourth quarter, Pittsburgh defense came up with a huge play as defensive end Brett Keisel forced a fumble off of Vikings quarterback Brett Favre, allowing linebacker LaMarr Woodley to return the fumble 77 yards for a touchdown. However, Minnesota immediately struck back as wide receiver Percy Harvin returned a kickoff 88 yards for a touchdown. The Steelers' defense came up big again as linebacker Keyaron Fox returned a Favre interception 82 yards for a touchdown.

With the huge win, Pittsburgh went into their bye week at 5–2, while Minnesota dropped to 6–1.

=== Week 9: at Denver Broncos ===
Quarter	1	2	3	4	Total
Steelers	0	7	7	14	28
Broncos	3	0	7	0	10

at INVESCO Field at Mile High, Denver, Colorado

- Game time: 8:30 p.m. EST
- Game weather: 55 °F (13 °C) (Mostly Clear)
- Game attendance: 76,716
- Referee: Don Carey
- TV announcers (ESPN): Mike Tirico, Ron Jaworski and Jon Gruden & Suzy Kolber

Coming off their bye week, the Steelers flew to INVESCO Field at Mile High for a Week 9 Monday night duel with the Denver Broncos. Pittsburgh trailed in the first quarter as the Broncos closed out the game's opening drive with kicker Matt Prater booting a 40-yard field goal, yet the Steelers answered in the second quarter as safety Tyrone Carter (who filled in for safety Ryan Clark) returned an interception 48 yards for a touchdown.

Denver answered in the third quarter as quarterback Ben Roethlisberger was sacked by defensive end Kenny Peterson, which caused a fumble. The ball was picked up by linebacker Robert Ayers and returned 54 yards for a touchdown. Pittsburgh answered with Roethlisberger completing a 3-yard touchdown pass to wide receiver Hines Ward. In the fourth quarter, the Steelers pulled away as Roethlisberger connected with rookie wide receiver Mike Wallace on a 25-yard touchdown pass, followed completing a 3-yard touchdown pass to Ward.

With the upset victory, Pittsburgh improved to 6–2.

=== Week 10: vs. Cincinnati Bengals ===
Quarter	1	2	3	4	Total
Bengals	6	0	6	6	18
Steelers	3	6	0	3	12

at Heinz Field, Pittsburgh, Pennsylvania

- Game time: 1:00 p.m. EST
- Game weather: 66 °F (19 °C) (cloudy)
- Game attendance: 65,392
- Referee: Terry McAulay
- TV announcers (CBS): Jim Nantz & Phil Simms

Coming off their impressive Monday night road win over the Broncos, the Steelers went home for a divisional rematch with the Cincinnati Bengals with first place in the division on the line.

In the first quarter, Pittsburgh delivered the game's first strike with a 28-yard field goal from kicker Jeff Reed. However, the Bengals immediately answered, as running back Bernard Scott returned a kickoff 96 yards for a touchdown (with a failed PAT). The Steelers regained the lead in the second quarter as Reed got a 33-yard and a 35-yard field goal.

Cincinnati responded in the third quarter as kicker Shayne Graham made a 23-yard and a 32-yard field goal. Pittsburgh tied the game in the fourth quarter, with Reed nailing a 34-yard field goal. However, the Bengals pulled away as Graham booted a 32-yard and a 43-yard field goal.

With the upset loss, the Steelers fell to 6–3.

=== Week 11: at Kansas City Chiefs ===
Quarter	1	2	3	4	OT	Total
Steelers	0	17	0	7	0	24
Chiefs	7	0	10	7	3	27

at Arrowhead Stadium, Kansas City, Missouri

- Game time: 1:00 p.m. EST
- Game weather: 55 °F (13 °C) (cloudy)
- Game attendance: 70,261
- Referee: Carl Cheffers
- TV announcers (CBS): Ian Eagle & Rich Gannon

After the loss to the Bengals, the Pittsburgh Steelers journeyed to Arrowhead Stadium for a match with the Chiefs.

At the start of the first quarter, Chiefs RB Jamaal Charles returned a kickoff from their own 3-yard line to the Steelers' endzone for a touchdown. In the second quarter, Pittsburgh rallied as PK Jeff Reed made a 36-yard field goal. Then QB Ben Roethlisberger made an 8-yard touchdown pass to WR Hines Ward, and then Roethlisberger passed to TE Heath Miller 10 yards for a touchdown.

In the third quarter the Chiefs tied the game when QB Matt Cassel made a 21-yard touchdown pass to TE Leonard Pope, and then kicker Ryan Succop made a 22-yard field goal. In the fourth quarter Pittsburgh took the lead as QB Ben Roethlisberger made an 8-yard touchdown pass to RB Rashard Mendenhall, until the Chiefs came back to tie the game as QB Matt Cassel made a two-yard touchdown pass to Jamaal Charles to put the game in overtime. Afterwards, it was Kansas City that took the win when kicker Ryan Succop made a 22-yard field goal.

With the shocking loss, the Steelers fell to 6–4.

=== Week 12: at Baltimore Ravens ===
Quarter	1	2	3	4	OT	Total
Steelers	0	7	3	7	0	17
Ravens	7	7	0	3	3	20

at M&T Bank Stadium, Baltimore, Maryland

- Game time: 8:20 p.m. EST
- Game weather: 58 °F (14 °C) (partly cloudy)
- Game attendance: 71,314
- Referee: Ed Hochuli
- TV announcers (NBC): Al Michaels, Cris Collinsworth & Andrea Kremer

Following a loss to the 3–7 Kansas City Chiefs the previous week, the Steelers traveled to M&T Bank Stadium for another divisional game. Ben Roethlisberger, who suffered a concussion in the previous week's overtime loss, was the designated 3rd (emergency) quarterback. Backup Charlie Batch also was hurt in that game, which left 2nd-year QB Dennis Dixon, who previously had one pass in his NFL career, to start.

The Steelers received the opening kickoff, but went three-and-out. On the ensuing possession, the Ravens drove down the field with ease, capping off their drive with a touchdown run by Willis McGahee. In the second quarter, Dixon hit WR Santonio Holmes on a play-action pass for a 33-yard TD, tying the game. The Ravens answered on the following drive, with a 52-yard strike from Joe Flacco to Mark Clayton, setting up a 10-yard touchdown pass to Derrick Mason.

In the third quarter, on the Ravens opening possession, Mark Clayton made a 9-yard reception but fumbled the ball and it was recovered by Tyrone Carter. The Steelers drove, but were held to a field goal by Jeff Reed. Later in the 4th quarter, Joe Flacco was sacked by Lawrence Timmons and fumbled the ball, recovered by the Steelers near midfield. The drive resulted in a 24-yard run on a QB option by Dixon, giving the Steelers their first lead of the night. On the Ravens next possession Joe Flacco completed a pass to Derrick Mason for 17 yards, and then found Ray Rice for a 44-yard reception, setting the Ravens up inside the Steeler 10 yard line with less than 2 minutes left. Billy Cundiff tied the game with a 24-yard field goal. On the following Steeler possession, Dennis Dixon was nearly intercepted by Lardarius Webb. The Steelers were forced to punt, giving the ball back to the Ravens with about 1:30 left in the game. The Ravens managed to drive to the Steeler 40 yard line, where their drive stalled. With the clock counting inside 10 seconds left and no timeouts, the field goal team managed to get into formation, and get the kick off. The 56 yard attempt by Billy Cundiff was dead center, but about 2 yards short, sending the game into overtime.

In overtime, the Steelers won the coin toss and got the ball, but were forced to punt. The Ravens, also forced to punt deep in their own territory, gave the ball to Pittsburgh around the Steeler 40 yard line. On a 3rd and 5, Dennis Dixon threw an interception to LB Paul Kruger, who returned the ball 26 yards to the Steeler 28 yard line. Already in field goal range, the Ravens ran the ball down to the Pittsburgh 11 yard line where Billy Cundiff made a 29-yard field goal to win the game.

With their second consecutive overtime loss, the Steelers fell to 6–5.

=== Week 13: vs. Oakland Raiders ===
Quarter	1	2	3	4	Total
Raiders	3	3	0	21	27
Steelers	3	7	0	14	24

at Heinz Field, Pittsburgh, Pennsylvania

- Game time: 1:00 p.m. EST
- Game weather: 27 °F (−3 °C) (sunny)
- Game attendance: 61,820
- Referee: Jerome Boger
- TV announcers (CBS): Greg Gumbel & Dan Dierdorf

Coming off back-to-back losses in overtime, the Steelers looked to turn things around. With the return of Ben Roethlisberger to action, the Steelers hosted the 3–8 Oakland Raiders.

The Steelers opened with a 33-yard field goal by Jeff Reed. Oakland responded with a 48-yarder by Sebastian Janikowski, and both teams were tied 3–3 as the 2nd quarter began. Roethlisberger found Santonio Holmes for a 34-yard TD pass to begin the 2nd quarter. Oakland put three points on the board after a 43-yard field goal halfway through the quarter, and the Steelers headed to halftime with a 10–6 lead.

There followed a scoreless third quarter, and in the fourth Pittsburgh's defensive struggles were exploited by the Raiders, who were able to find the end zone three times. Bruce Gradkowski found Chaz Schilens for a 17-yard TD pass with 8:21 remaining in the game, giving Oakland their first lead of the game, 13–10. Pittsburgh responded just one minute later with a 3-yard TD run by Rashard Mendenhall. However, Oakland would not be stopped. Gradkowski hit Louis Murphy for a 75-yard TD pass with 5:28 remaining, and the Raiders went up 20–17. Roethlisberger made an 11-yard TD pass to Hines Ward with 1:56 remaining, and the Steelers regained the lead 24–20. All that was needed was for the Steelers' defense to keep Oakland out of the end zone and they would have won. With nine seconds remaining, Gradkowski once again found Louis Murphy open in the end zone for an 11-yard TD pass, and the Raiders won 27–24.

The game marked the fifth time in six games that the Steelers suffered a 4th quarter collapse, and the second time in three weeks Pittsburgh had fallen to an opponent with a losing record. At the conclusion of the game, the Steelers had allowed seven plays of 40 yards or longer in their last four games (they only gave up two such plays in 2008).

With the loss, the Steelers fell to 6–6.

=== Week 14: at Cleveland Browns ===
Quarter	1	2	3	4	Total
Steelers	0	3	3	0	6
Browns	6	7	0	0	13

at Cleveland Browns Stadium, Cleveland, Ohio

- Game time: 8:20 p.m. EST
- Game weather: 16 °F (−9 °C) (partly cloudy)
- Game attendance: 69,009
- Referee: Ron Winter
- TV announcers (NFLN): Bob Papa & Matt Millen

After losing four games in a row, the Steelers went to Cleveland for a Thursday night divisional match.

In windy, below-freezing conditions, Browns kicker Phil Dawson hit a 29-yard field goal in the 1st quarter to give the Brown's an early 3–0 lead. He kicked another 29-yarder in the 2nd quarter, and Chris Jennings had a 10-yard touchdown run to put the Browns up 13–0. Jeff Reed kicked a field goal before the half to put the Steelers on the board. They went into halftime down 13–3.

Jeff Reed kicked another field goal in the 3rd quarter to bring them within a touchdown. However, a scoreless 4th quarter by both teams led the Browns to their first win against the Steelers since 2003, becoming only the fourth team in NFL history to be at least 10 games under .500 and defeat the defending Super Bowl champions.

With another loss, the Steelers fell to 6–7. This was the first time since the 1987 New York Giants that a defending Super Bowl Champion team suffered five consecutive losses.

=== Week 15 vs. Green Bay Packers ===
Week Fifteen: Green Bay Packers (9-4) at Pittsburgh Steelers (6-7)

Quarter	1	2	3	4	Total
Packers	7	7	0	22	36
Steelers	14	7	3	13	37

at Heinz Field • Pittsburgh, Pennsylvania

- Date: December 20
- Game time: 4:15 p.m. EDT
- Game weather: Cloudy • 30 °F (−1 °C) • Wind W 10 miles per hour (16 km/h; 8.7 kn)
- Game attendance: 57,452
- Referee: John Parry
- TV announcers (Fox): Joe Buck, Troy Aikman, and Pam Oliver
- Gamebook

Game information

Packers

- Aaron Rodgers
  26/48, 383 yds, 3 TD
- Ryan Grant
  8 rush, 24 yds
- Greg Jennings
  5 rec, 118 yds, TD

Steelers

- Ben Roethlisberger
  29/46, 503 yds, 3 TD
- Rashard Mendenhall
  11 rush, 38 yds, TD
- Hines Ward
  7 rec, 126 yds

The Steelers came into the game riding a five-game losing streak. They also no longer controlled their playoff destiny, needing to win their final three games of the season, and also losses by other AFC teams to have a chance for a wild card.

Pittsburgh ststruckrike on their first play of the game when Ben Roethlisberger hit a wide-open Mike Wallace for a 60-yard TD pass. Green Bay answered with an 83-yard strike from Aaron Rodgers to Greg Jennings for a TD. The Steelers capped the 1st quarter with a 2-yard TD run by Rashard Mendenhall. In the 2nd quarter, QB Aaron Rodgers was able to scramble out of the pocket for a 14-yard TD run. Ben Roethlisberger hit Mewelde Moore for a 10-yard TD pass in the final seconds of the 1st half, and the Steelers took a 21–14 lead into halftime with them.

The 2nd half got off to a slow start for both teams. Jeff Reed kicked a 37-yard field goal, the only scoring of the 3rd quarter. In the 4th quarter, it became a shootout between both quarterbacks. Aaron Rodgers hit Jermichael Finley for an 11-yard TD pass. The Steelers answered with a 34-yard field goal, but lost the lead for the first time in the game when Ryan Grant rushed for a 24-yard score, putting Green Bay up 28–27. The Steelers once again answered with a 43-yard field goal, but Aaron Rodgers completed a 24-yard TD pass to James Jones and follow it with a successful 2-point conversion attempt. The Steelers, down 36–30, got the ball back with just 2 minutes left in the game. With just 3 seconds remaining, Ben Roethlisberger hit Mike Wallace in the left sideline of the endzone (in a TD pass that resembled the Super Bowl-winning catch by Santonio Holmes back in February), and the extra point was good, giving the Steelers a last-second 37–36 win over the Packers.

Ben Roethlisberger finished with a record-setting game, going 29/46 for 503 yards and 3 TD passes. He became the first quarterback in Steelers' franchise history to have a 500-yard game.

With the last second win, the Steelers moved to 7–7.

These two teams would meet again a year later in Super Bowl XLV, with the Steelers falling short 25-31.

Scoring summary

Quarter	Time	Drive			Team	Scoring information	Score	
Quarter	Time	Plays	Yards	TOP	Team	Scoring information	GB	PIT
1	14:18	1	60	0:10	Steelers	Mike Wallace 60-yard touchdown reception from Ben Roethlisberger, Jeff Reed kick good	0	7
1	9:56	3	88	1:33	Packers	Greg Jennings 83-yard touchdown reception from Aaron Rodgers, Mason Crosby kick good	7	7
1	3:47	10	72	6:09	Steelers	Rashard Mendenhall 1-yard touchdown run, Jeff Reed kick good	7	14
2	3:04	8	52	3:51	Packers	Aaron Rodgers 14-yard touchdown run, Mason Crosby kick good	14	14
2	0:26	6	80	2:38	Steelers	Mewelde Moore 10-yard touchdown reception from Ben Roethlisberger, Jeff Reed kick good	14	21
3	4:36	11	55	6:12	Steelers	37-yard field goal by Jeff Reed	14	24
4	13:30	13	69	6:06	Packers	Jermichael Finley 11-yard touchdown reception from Aaron Rodgers, Mason Crosby kick good	21	24
4	9:45	8	47	3:45	Steelers	34-yard field goal by Jeff Reed	21	27
4	7:49	4	62	1:56	Packers	Ryan Grant 24-yard touchdown run, Mason Crosby kick good	28	27
4	3:58	6	44	3:51	Steelers	43-yard field goal by Jeff Reed	28	30
4	2:06	6	39	1:52	Packers	James Jones 24-yard touchdown reception from Aaron Rodgers, 2-point pass good	36	30
4	0:00	11	86	2:06	Steelers	Mike Wallace 19-yard touchdown reception from Ben Roethlisberger, Jeff Reed kick good	36	37
"TOP" = time of possession. For other American football terms, see Glossary of American football.							36	37

=== Week 16: vs. Baltimore Ravens ===
Quarter	1	2	3	4	Total
Ravens	3	7	10	0	20
Steelers	6	14	0	3	23

at Heinz Field, Pittsburgh, Pennsylvania

- Game time: 1:00 p.m. EST
- Game weather: 43 °F (6 °C) (sunny)
- Game attendance: 64,068
- Referee: Pete Morelli
- TV announcers (CBS): Dick Enberg and Dan Fouts

Coming off a win over the Green Bay Packers, the Steelers hosted the Baltimore Ravens in their second matchup of the season. There was much at stake, as the Ravens needed to win to get into the playoffs, and the Steelers needed to win in order to keep their faint playoff hopes alive as well.

Jeff Reed booted 26-yard and 39-yard field goals and Billy Cundiff kicked a 27-yarder to give the Steelers a 6–3 lead as they started the second quarter. The Steelers' offense started rolling, scoring on a 4-yard run by Rashard Mendenhall. Joe Flacco responded with a 30-yard TD pass to Todd Heap. But in the final seconds of the first half, Ben Roethlisberger found Santonio Holmes for a 24-yard TD pass, and the Steelers carried a 20–10 lead with them into halftime.

Baltimore controlled the third quarter. Flacco hit Heaps for a seven-yard TD pass and Cundiff kicked a 35-yard field goal to tie the game. The fourth quarter saw both defenses step up. Jeff Reed kicked a 38-yard field goal with 5:25 remaining to give the Steelers a 23–20 lead. Baltimore had one more chance to score, but rookie defensive end Ziggy Hood recorded his first career sack and then recovered Flacco's fumble on a fourth and 10 play from the Steelers' 39 with 2:27 remaining. An apparent interception thrown by Roethlisberger was negated by an "illegal block in the back" penalty and the Steelers ran out the clock, securing the win.

The win not only prevented Baltimore from clinching a wild card, but kept Pittsburgh's playoff hopes alive as well. They needed to win at Miami in their season finale and also need other teams to lose.

With the win, the Steelers moved to 8–7.

=== Week 17: at Miami Dolphins ===
Quarter	1	2	3	4	Total
Steelers	14	3	7	6	30
Dolphins	7	3	0	14	24

at Land Shark Stadium, Miami Gardens, Florida

- Game time: 1:00 p.m. EST
- Game weather: 61 °F (16 °C) (sunny)
- Game attendance: 70,102
- Referee: Bill Leavy
- TV announcers (CBS): Greg Gumbel & Dan Dierdorf

The Steelers' defense averted a fourth-quarter collapse while sending two of Miami's quarterbacks to the sideline, including third-string Pat White, who was hit in the head and carried off the field on a stretcher.

In the first quarter, Ben Roethlisberger hit Santonio Holmes for a five-yard TD on their opening possession. Miami responded quickly, when Chad Henne threw an 11-yard pass to Lex Hilliard. A few minutes later, Roethlisberger found Mike Wallace wide open for a 54-yard TD. In the second quarter, Miami's Dan Carpenter kicked a 25-yard field goal and Pittsburgh's Jeff Reed kicked a 22-yard field goal to give the Steelers a 17–10 halftime lead.

The Steelers put the only points on the board in the third quarter, scoring on a three-yard TD pass to Heath Miller. The Steelers carried a 20–10 lead into the fourth quarter, but that was not enough to allow them to play conservatively. Following Reed's 21-yard field goal to start the final quarter, Miami rallied back with the help of fourth-string quarterback Tyler Thigpen. Brian Hartline rushed for a 16-yard TD run and Thigpen threw a 34-yard TD pass to Davone Bess, drawing the Dolphins back within a field goal of tying the game. Former Steelers linebacker Joey Porter recovered a fumble by Roethlisberger at the Steelers' 13-yard line with 6 minutes remaining, but Thigpen was intercepted at the two-yard line. The Steelers drove 83 yards in the final minutes, ending the game with a 33-yard field goal, and a 30–24 win.

The Steelers' win brought their season-ending winning record to 9–7. The injury-ridden Dolphins had been eliminated from post-season contention minutes earlier when the Texans defeated the Patriots (ensuring that the Dolphins would not play Super Bowl XLIV in their own home). For four hours, the Steelers waited for the Ravens–Raiders game to end, but Baltimore won and got the No. 6 AFC seed, thus preventing the Steelers from attempting to repeat their world title.

== Post-season summary ==
The Pittsburgh Steelers battled many injuries throughout the year. Troy Polamalu only played in five games the entire season, Ben Roethlisberger missed a critical divisional game against the Ravens due to a concussion, Chris Kemoeatu missed four games, Travis Kirschke missed five games, and Aaron Smith missed 10 games.

The Steelers beat four eventual playoff-bound teams: the Green Bay Packers, the Minnesota Vikings, the Baltimore Ravens, and the San Diego Chargers. The Steelers' offense gained 369.2 yards a game (263.1 coming through the air, and 106.1 coming on the ground). The Steelers' defense allowed their opponents to compile 305.5 average yards per game, and allowed only an average of 89.3 yards a game on the ground. Ben Roethlisberger was able to set team passing records in the following categories: completion percentage, completions, attempts, and yards. The Steelers defense compiled 47 sacks, and the team finished with 41 total touchdowns and 3 defensive touchdowns.

However, five of the Steelers seven losses came from blowing leads in the fourth quarter. Had they won those games, they would have finished with a 14–2 record. Five of their losses came consecutively, losing to the Bengals, Chiefs, Ravens, Raiders, and Browns. They finished 2–4 against teams with losing records. Pittsburgh’s special team allowed eight straight kickoff/punt returns for touchdowns. The Steelers also allowed for a 100-yard rusher in Week 16 against Baltimore (Ray Rice, 141-yards), snapping their 33-game streak of not allowing one.

Ben Roethlisberger was voted the team’s Most Valuable Player and Offensive Player of the Year. He was the first quarterback in Steelers’ franchise history to throw for 4,000 yards in a season, throwing 26 touchdowns. Rookie of the Year honors went to receiver Mike Wallace, who had 39 receptions for 756-yards and 6 touchdowns. Rashard Mendenhall was awarded Most Improved Player, finishing with 1,108 yards rushing and 8 touchdowns. Defensive Player of the Year went to James Harrison, who finished the season with 79 tackles, 11 sacks, and three forced fumbles.

James Harrison and Casey Hampton were voted to the Pro Bowl, Harrison as a starter and Hampton as a reserve. Lamar Woodley and Heath Miller were added to the Pro Bowl roster as replacements for players who could not attend. Ben Roethlisberger was the first alternate among AFC QBs, but due to a shoulder injury he turned down the opportunity to replace Tom Brady.

Lamar Woodley was named to the Associated Press (AP) All-Pro second team. James Harrison received the 5th-most votes among outside linebackers in the AP balloting, leaving him just off the second team. However, it was later discovered that Brian Cushing of the Houston Texans, who was named to the AP's second-team at outside linebacker, had tested positive for a banned drug during the season. The AP chose to re-open balloting and Harrison and Lance Briggs of the Chicago Bears leapfrogged Cushing and made the second-team. Other Steelers receiving AP All-pro votes were tackle Willie Colon (1 vote, thirteenth among offensive tackles), nose tackle Casey Hampton (1 vote, sixth among defensive tackles), tight end Heath Miller (1 vote, fifth among tight ends) and placekicker Jeff Reed (1 vote, fourth among kickers). Harrison was named a second team All-Pro by The Sporting News.
