= Keyaron Fox =

American football player (born 1982)

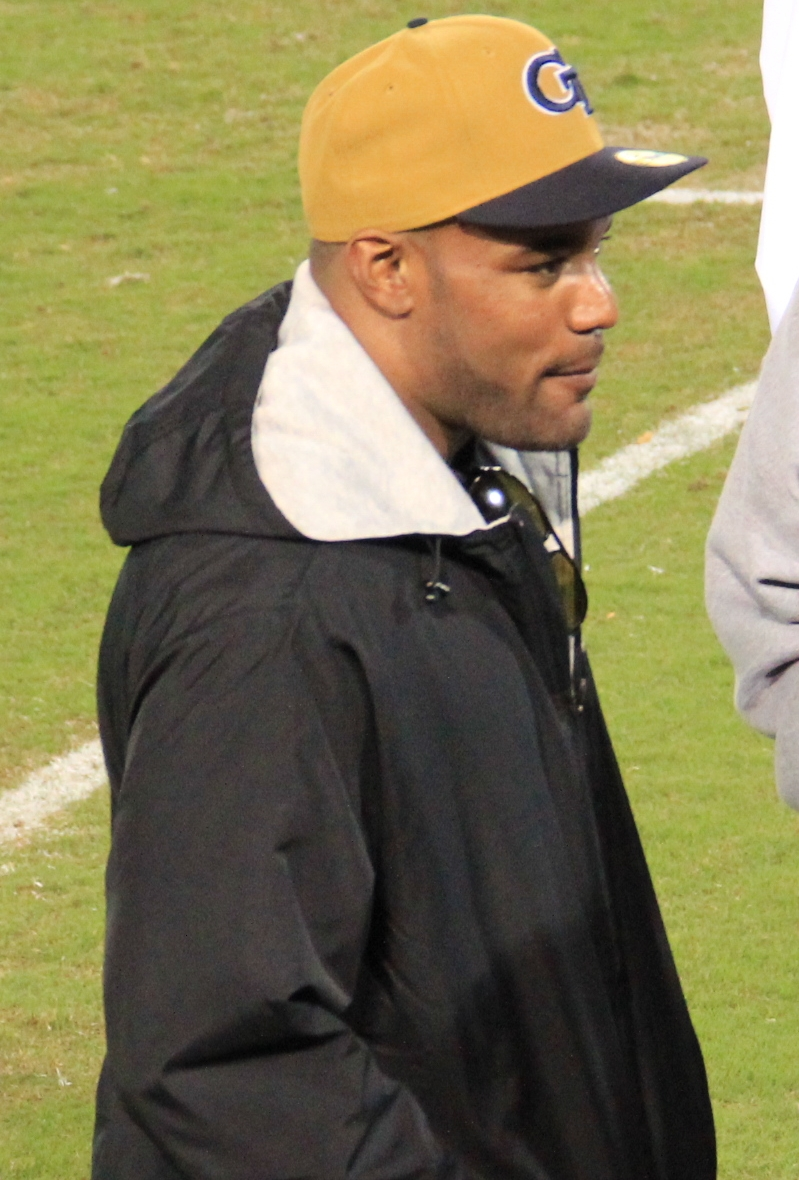
- Fox in 2013

No. 97, 57, 51
- Position: Linebacker

Personal information
- Born: January 24, 1982 (age 44); Atlanta, Georgia, U.S.
- Listed height: 6 ft 3 in (1.91 m)
- Listed weight: 235 lb (107 kg)

Career information
- High school: Westlake (Atlanta)
- College: Georgia Tech
- NFL draft: 2004: 3rd round, 93rd overall pick

Career history
- Kansas City Chiefs (2004−2007); Pittsburgh Steelers (2008−2010); Washington Redskins (2011); Houston Texans (2012)

Awards and highlights
- Super Bowl champion (XLIII); Second-team All-American (2003); First-team All-ACC (2003)

Career NFL statistics
- Total tackles: 181
- Sacks: 1
- Forced fumbles: 1
- Fumble recoveries: 5
- Interceptions: 1
- Defensive touchdowns: 1
- Stats at Pro Football Reference

Keyaron James Fox /kiˈærən/, born January 24, 1982) is an American former professional football player who was a linebacker in the National Football League (NFL). He was selected by the Kansas City Chiefs in the third round of the 2004 NFL draft. He played college football for the Georgia Tech Yellow Jackets.

Fox also played for the Pittsburgh Steelers, Washington Redskins, and Houston Texans. He won Super Bowl XLIII during his tenure with the Steelers.

== College career ==
He played in 45 games (35 starts) during his tenure at Georgia Tech and finished his career with 376 tackles, 9 sacks, 40 tackles for loss, one INT, two fumble recoveries, six forced fumbles, 14 passes defensed, and seven QB pressures. He majored in management.

== Professional career ==
Pre-draft measurables
Height	Weight	Arm length	Hand span	40-yard dash	20-yard shuttle	Three-cone drill	Vertical jump	Broad jump	Bench press
6 ft 2 3/8 in (1.89 m)	227 lb (103 kg)	32 7/8 in (0.84 m)	9 1/2 in (0.24 m)	4.73 s	4.24 s	7.11 s	36.5 in (0.93 m)	9 ft 6 in (2.90 m)	28 reps
All values from NFL Combine/Pro Day

=== Kansas City Chiefs ===
Fox was originally selected by the Kansas City Chiefs in the third round (93rd overall) of the 2004 NFL Draft. In his rookie season he played 12 games and finished the campaign with 7 tackles. His second season with the Chiefs was low key as he only recorded three tackles. In 2006, Fox had a career-high season with 52 tackles and one sack. In his final year with the Chiefs, he played in ten games, recording 21 tackles.

=== Pittsburgh Steelers ===
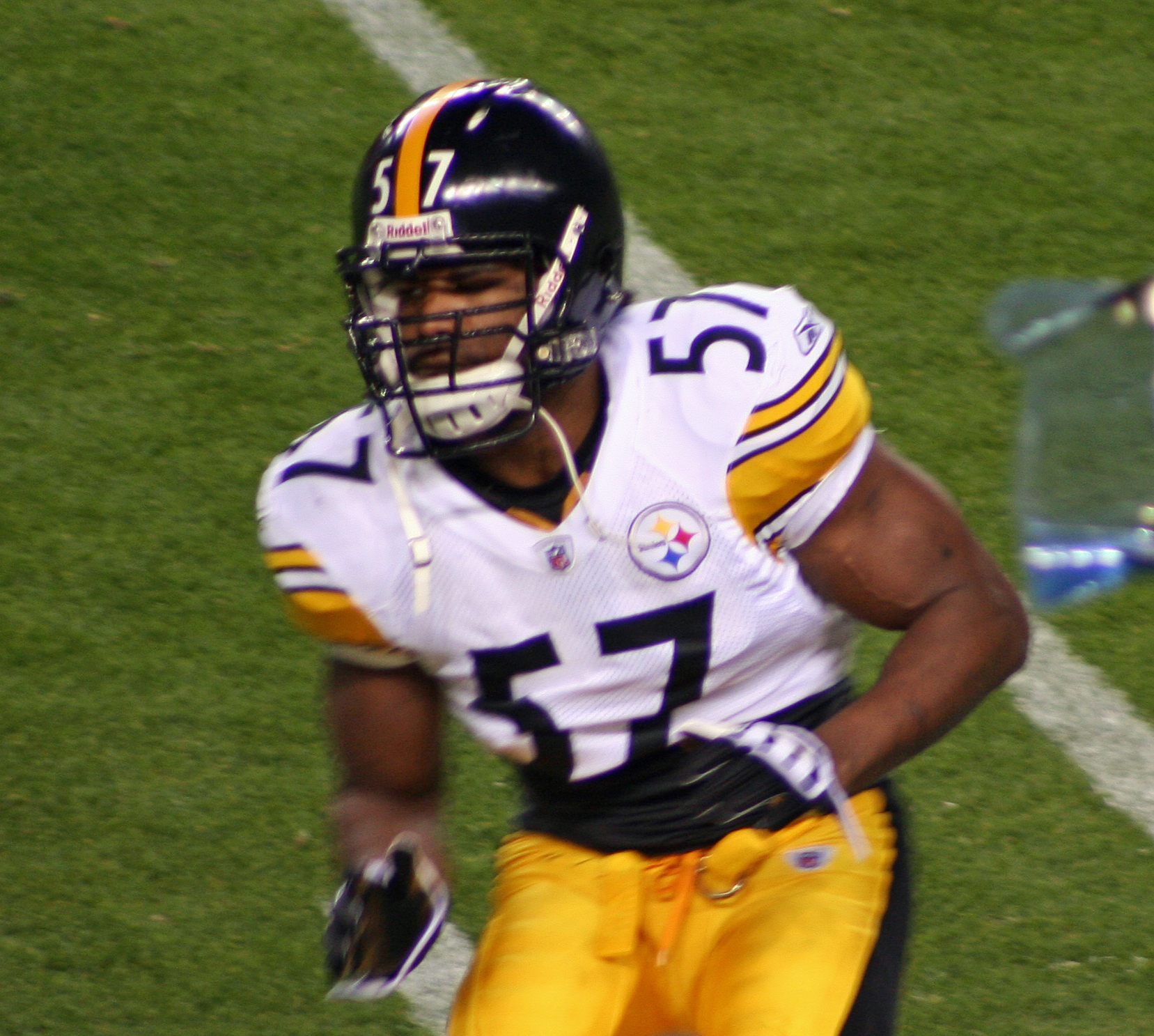
Fox with the Steelers in 2009.

On March 12, 2008, Fox signed with the Pittsburgh Steelers as a free agent. He recorded 17 tackles in 13 games in 2008 as the Steelers beat the Arizona Cardinals in Super Bowl XLIII.

An unrestricted free agent in the 2009 offseason, Fox was re-signed to a two-year, $1.8 million contract on April 6.

In week 6 of the 2009 season, Fox filled in for an injured Lawrence Timmons, where he intercepted a Brett Favre pass running it back for an 82-yard touchdown to help the Steelers secure a 27–17 victory over the undefeated Minnesota Vikings.

Fox was named the Steelers' special teams captain in 2009 and 2010.

=== Washington Redskins ===
On August 6, 2011, Fox signed with the Washington Redskins.

=== Houston Texans ===
On July 26, 2012, Fox signed with the Houston Texans. During training camp, he suffered a knee injury and was placed on the injured reserve list on August 9.

== NFL career statistics ==
Legend
**Bold**	Career high

=== Regular season ===
Year	Team	Games		Tackles					Interceptions					Fumbles			
Year	Team	GP	GS	Cmb	Solo	Ast	Sck	TFL	Int	Yds	TD	Lng	PD	FF	FR	Yds	TD
2004	KAN	12	0	7	6	1	0.0	0	0	0	0	0	0	0	0	0	0
2005	KAN	2	0	3	3	0	0.0	1	0	0	0	0	0	0	0	0	0
2006	KAN	16	4	**52**	**44**	8	**1.0**	**3**	0	0	0	0	1	0	0	0	0
2007	KAN	10	0	21	19	2	0.0	**3**	0	0	0	0	0	0	0	0	0
2008	PIT	13	0	17	11	6	0.0	0	0	0	0	0	0	0	**2**	**18**	0
2009	PIT	16	3	44	31	**13**	0.0	1	**1**	**82**	**1**	**82**	1	0	1	5	0
2010	PIT	16	0	23	17	6	0.0	1	0	0	0	0	**2**	**1**	**2**	0	0
2011	WAS	13	0	14	10	4	0.0	2	0	0	0	0	0	0	0	0	0
		98	7	181	141	40	1.0	11	1	82	1	82	4	1	5	23	0

=== Playoffs ===
Year	Team	Games		Tackles					Interceptions					Fumbles			
Year	Team	GP	GS	Cmb	Solo	Ast	Sck	TFL	Int	Yds	TD	Lng	PD	FF	FR	Yds	TD
2006	KAN	1	0	4	**3**	1	0.0	0	0	0	0	0	0	0	0	0	0
2008	PIT	3	0	**5**	1	**4**	0.0	0	0	0	0	0	0	0	0	0	0
2010	PIT	3	0	2	2	0	0.0	0	0	0	0	0	0	0	0	0	0
		7	0	11	6	5	0.0	0	0	0	0	0	0	0	0	0	0
