= Keenan Lewis =

American football player (born 1986)

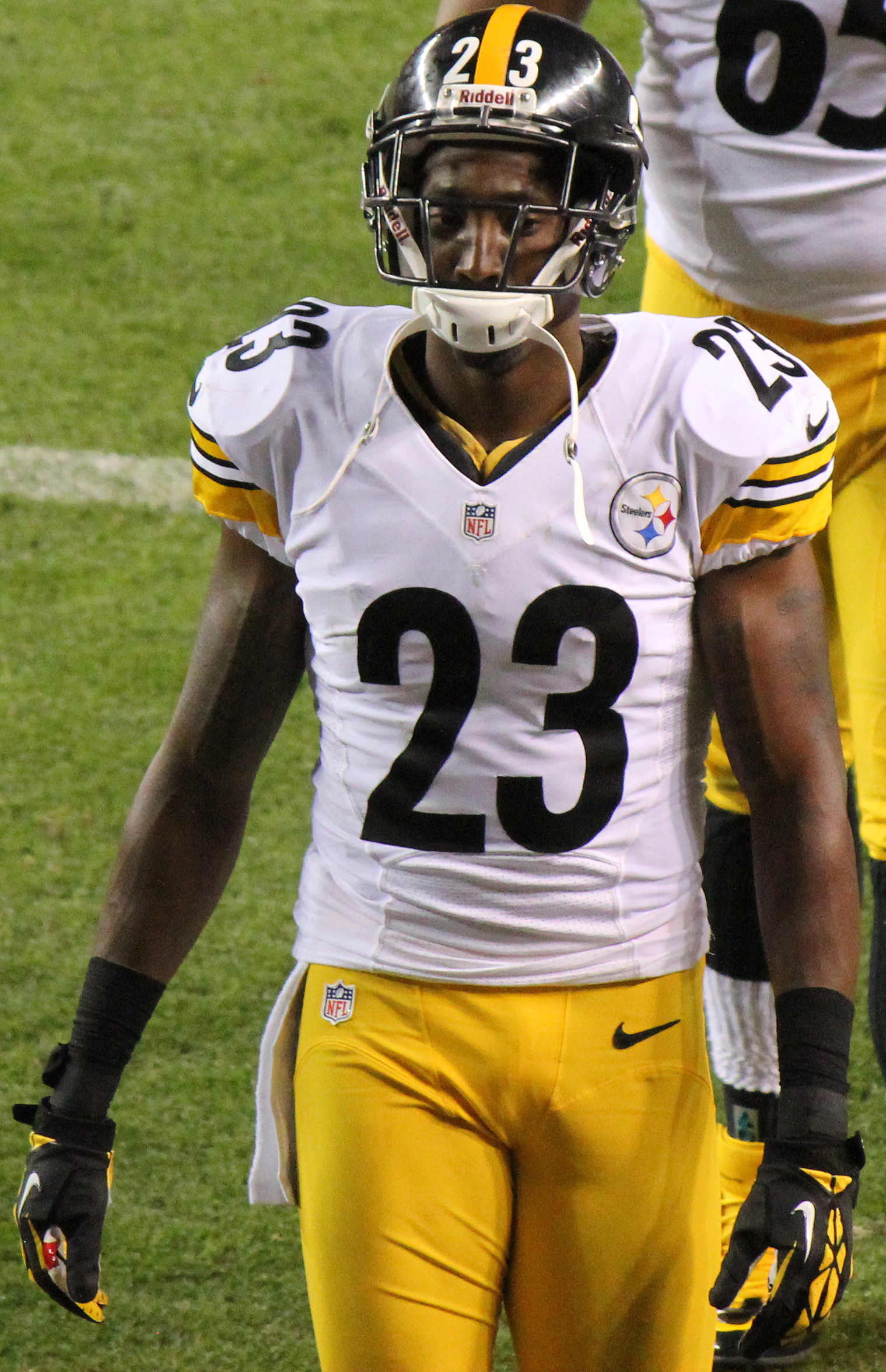
- Lewis with the Pittsburgh Steelers in 2012

No. 20, 23, 28, 21
- Position: Cornerback

Personal information
- Born: May 17, 1986 (age 40); New Orleans, Louisiana, U.S.
- Listed height: 6 ft 1 in (1.85 m)
- Listed weight: 208 lb (94 kg)

Career information
- High school: O. Perry Walker (New Orleans)
- College: Oregon State
- NFL draft: 2009: 3rd round, 96th overall pick

Career history
- Pittsburgh Steelers (2009–2012); New Orleans Saints (2013–2015)

Career NFL statistics
- Total tackles: 213
- Forced fumbles: 3
- Pass deflections: 53
- Interceptions: 7
- Stats at Pro Football Reference

Keenan Girod Lewis (born May 17, 1986) is an American former professional football player who was a cornerback in the National Football League (NFL). He was selected by the Pittsburgh Steelers in the third round of the 2009 NFL draft, and also played for the New Orleans Saints. He played college football for the Oregon State Beavers.

== Early life ==
Lewis attended O. Perry Walker High School in New Orleans, Louisiana and was schoolmates and teammates with NFL wide receiver Mike Wallace. He was a three-year starter for head coach Terry Wilson. He made 75 tackles as a senior with four quarterback sacks and seven interceptions, also returned five punts for 180 yards and five kickoffs for 150 yards in 2003. Was named first-team all-metro and all-league as a senior. He recorded 71 tackles with two interceptions as a junior and 54 tackles as a sophomore.

== College career ==
Lewis played for Oregon State between 2004 and 2008. After redshirting as a freshman in 2004, he started all 11 games and ended the year with 98 tackles, fourth on the team in 2005. He led the team for pass breakups with 11. He made the College Football News Third-team Freshman All-American and honorable mention by the Sporting News. In 2006, Lewis made 22 tackles for the season, was second on the team with eight pass breakups, and also accounted for a sack and two tackles for loss. Lewis finished off his career as one of the most physical corners in the, then, Pac-10 conference.

== Professional career ==
Pre-draft measurables
Height	Weight	40-yard dash	10-yard split	20-yard split	20-yard shuttle	Three-cone drill	Vertical jump	Broad jump	Bench press
6 ft 0 in (1.83 m)	208 lb (94 kg)	4.55 s	1.59 s	2.62 s	4.42 s	6.89 s	33 1/2 in (0.85 m)	10 ft 3 in (3.12 m)	19 reps
All values from NFL Combine/Oregon State's Pro Day

=== Pittsburgh Steelers ===
The Pittsburgh Steelers selected Lewis in the third round (96th overall) of the 2009 NFL draft.

On June 12, 2009, the Steelers signed Lewis to a three-year, $1.66 million contract.

=== New Orleans Saints ===
On March 14, 2013, the New Orleans Saints signed Lewis to a five-year, $26.3 million contract that includes $10.5 million guaranteed and a signing bonus of $6 million. On November 26, 2015, Lewis was placed on injured reserve with a leg injury, ending his season. Lewis had been slowly recovering from January 2016 hip surgery. He started training camp on the physically unable to perform list, and although the team activated him from PUP on August 3, he practiced just one day and had been sidelined ever since. On August 19, Lewis was released by the Saints.

=== Free agency ===
On April 25, 2016, it was reported that the Steelers met with Keenan Lewis and explored a possible agreement with the free agent. He underwent an MRI and a physical and it was discovered Lewis was still dealing with the hip injury that caused his release from the Saints. The Steelers elected not to sign him.

On April 29, 2017, the Steelers again hosted Lewis on a visit to look into the possibility signing the free agent, but again decided against it.

== NFL career statistics ==
Legend
**Bold**	Career high

=== Regular season ===
Year	Team	Games		Tackles					Interceptions					Fumbles			
Year	Team	GP	GS	Cmb	Solo	Ast	Sck	TFL	Int	Yds	TD	Lng	PD	FF	FR	Yds	TD
2009	PIT	4	0	1	1	0	0.0	0	0	0	0	0	0	0	0	0	0
2010	PIT	9	0	11	8	3	0.0	0	0	0	0	0	0	**1**	0	0	0
2011	PIT	**16**	1	37	30	7	0.0	0	1	9	0	9	6	0	0	0	0
2012	PIT	**16**	**16**	**71**	**56**	**15**	0.0	**2**	0	0	0	0	**23**	**1**	0	0	0
2013	NO	**16**	**16**	47	39	8	0.0	1	**4**	**34**	0	**20**	9	**1**	0	0	0
2014	NO	**16**	**16**	40	37	3	0.0	1	2	2	0	2	13	0	0	0	0
2015	NO	6	0	6	6	0	0.0	0	0	0	0	0	2	0	0	0	0
		83	49	213	177	36	0.0	4	7	45	0	20	53	3	0	0	0

=== Playoffs ===
Year	Team	Games		Tackles					Interceptions					Fumbles			
Year	Team	GP	GS	Cmb	Solo	Ast	Sck	TFL	Int	Yds	TD	Lng	PD	FF	FR	Yds	TD
2010	PIT	**3**	0	0	0	0	0.0	0	0	0	0	0	0	0	0	0	0
2011	PIT	1	0	1	1	0	0.0	0	0	0	0	0	0	0	0	0	0
2013	NO	2	**2**	**5**	**5**	0	0.0	0	0	0	0	0	**2**	0	0	0	0
		6	2	6	6	0	0.0	0	0	0	0	0	2	0	0	0	0
