= David Johnson (tight end) =

American football player (born 1987)

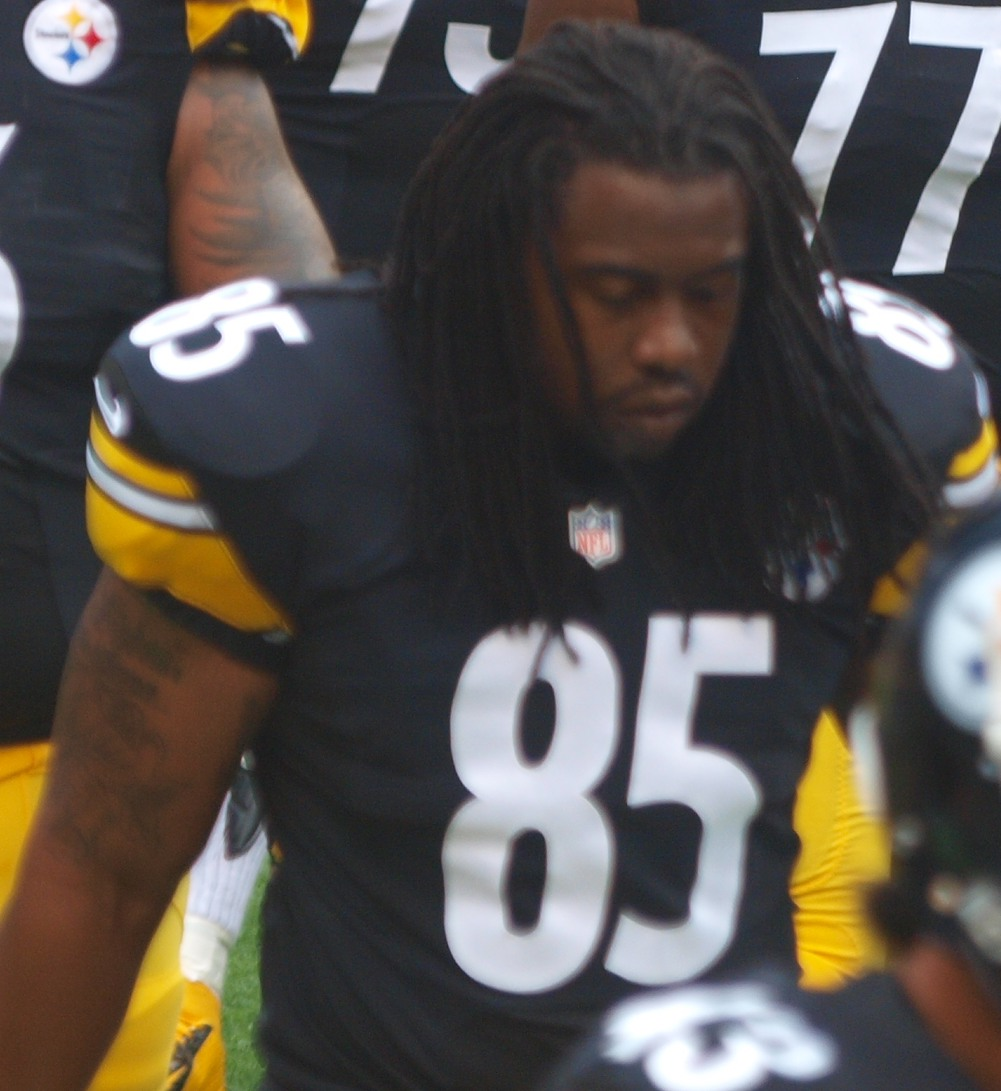
- Johnson with the Pittsburgh Steelers in 2013

No. 85, 88, 82
- Positions: Tight end, Fullback

Personal information
- Born: August 26, 1987 (age 39); Pine Bluff, Arkansas, U.S.
- Listed height: 6 ft 2 in (1.88 m)
- Listed weight: 260 lb (118 kg)

Career information
- High school: Pine Bluff
- College: Arkansas State
- NFL draft: 2009: 7th round, 241st overall pick

Career history
- Pittsburgh Steelers (2009−2013); San Diego Chargers (2014–2015); Pittsburgh Steelers (2016)

Awards and highlights
- Second-team All-Sun Belt (2008)

Career NFL statistics
- Receptions: 31
- Receiving yards: 304
- Receiving touchdowns: 1
- Stats at Pro Football Reference

David Johnson (born August 26, 1987) is an American former professional football player who was a tight end and fullback in the National Football League (NFL). He played college football for Arkansas State Red Wolves, twice earning All-Sun Belt Conference honors. Johnson was selected by the Pittsburgh Steelers in the seventh round (241st overall) of the 2009 NFL draft. He was also a member of the San Diego Chargers.

== Professional career ==
Pre-draft measurables
Height	Weight	Arm length	Hand span	40-yard dash	10-yard split	20-yard split	20-yard shuttle	Three-cone drill	Vertical jump	Broad jump	Bench press
6 ft 1 1/2 in (1.87 m)	260 lb (118 kg)	33 3/4 in (0.86 m)	10 3/4 in (0.27 m)	4.73 s	1.63 s	2.75 s	4.43 s	7.28 s	32.5 in (0.83 m)	9 ft 5 in (2.87 m)	21 reps
All values from NFL Combine

=== Pittsburgh Steelers (first stint) ===
At the end of the 2010 season, Johnson and the Steelers appeared in Super Bowl XLV. He was the starting fullback in the 31–25 loss to the Green Bay Packers.

On October 9, 2011, Johnson scored his first career touchdown when he caught a one-yard pass from quarterback Ben Roethlisberger against the Tennessee Titans.

On April 11, 2012, the Steelers signed Johnson to a one-year, $1.26 million contract. During a preseason game against the Philadelphia Eagles on August 10, 2012, Johnson suffered a torn ACL which eliminated him for the 2012 season. He was waived/injured on August 13, 2012, and subsequently reverted to injured reserve on August 16. On March 12, 2013, the Steelers signed Johnson again to a one-year deal.

=== San Diego Chargers ===
Johnson signed with the San Diego Chargers on March 12, 2014.

=== Pittsburgh Steelers (second stint) ===
On May 17, 2016, the Steelers signed Johnson to a one-year deal. In his first season back with Pittsburgh, he played in all 16 regular season games, catching 7 passes for 80 yards. He also caught a 2-point conversion pass from Ben Roethlisberger in Week 10 against the Cleveland Browns. Johnson played in all three of the Steelers' postseason contests, making his only postseason reception for 1 yard against the New England Patriots in the AFC Championship.

On March 9, 2017, Johnson re-signed with the Steelers. He was released on September 2, 2017.

== NFL career statistics ==
Year	Team	GP	GS	Receiving				
Year	Team	GP	GS	Rec	Yds	Avg	Lng	TD
2009	PIT	15	3	2	9	4.5	5	0
2010	PIT	16	5	4	46	11.5	25	0
2011	PIT	16	16	12	91	7.6	25	1
2013	PIT	5	2	4	70	17.5	32	0
2014	SD	14	2	1	4	4.0	4	0
2015	SD	16	4	1	4	4.0	4	0
2016	PIT	16	5	7	80	11.4	26	0
Career		98	37	31	304	9.8	32	1
