= Mike Wallace (American football) =

American football player (born 1986)

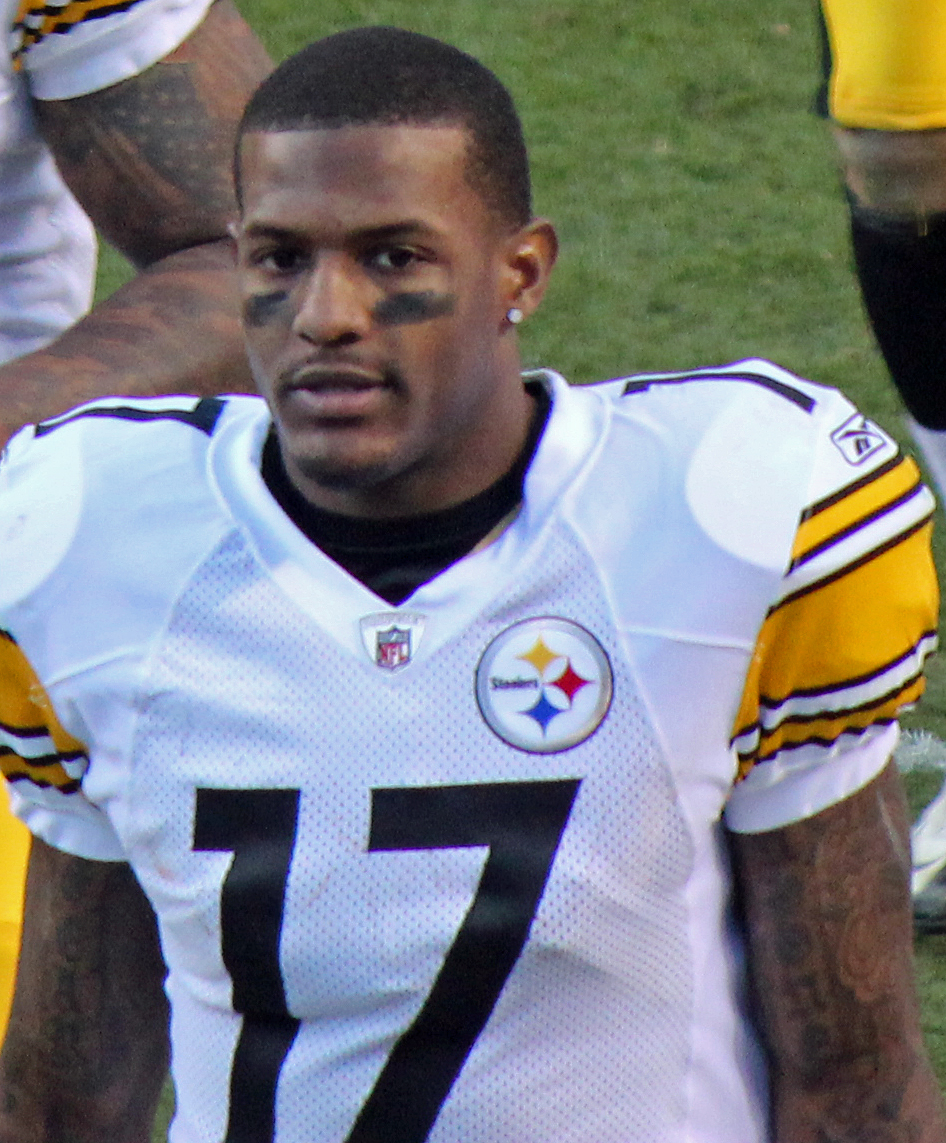
- Wallace with the Pittsburgh Steelers in 2012

No. 17, 11, 14
- Position: Wide receiver

Personal information
- Born: August 1, 1986 (age 40); New Orleans, Louisiana, U.S.
- Listed height: 6 ft 0 in (1.83 m)
- Listed weight: 200 lb (91 kg)

Career information
- High school: O. Perry Walker (New Orleans)
- College: Ole Miss (2004–2008)
- NFL draft: 2009: 3rd round, 84th overall pick

Career history
- Pittsburgh Steelers (2009–2012); Miami Dolphins (2013–2014); Minnesota Vikings (2015); Baltimore Ravens (2016–2017); Philadelphia Eagles (2018)

Awards and highlights
- Pro Bowl (2011)

Career NFL statistics
- Receptions: 538
- Receiving yards: 8,072
- Receiving touchdowns: 57
- Stats at Pro Football Reference

Burnell Michael Wallace III (born August 1, 1986) is an American former professional football player who was a wide receiver in the National Football League (NFL). He played college football for Ole Miss Rebels, and was selected by the Pittsburgh Steelers in the third round of the 2009 NFL draft with the 84th overall pick. He also played for the Miami Dolphins, Minnesota Vikings, Baltimore Ravens, and Philadelphia Eagles. Throughout his career, Wallace was known for his speed after finishing with a time of 4.33-seconds in the 40-yard dash at the NFL Scouting Combine. He has run the 40 in as fast as 4.21 seconds.

== Early life ==
Wallace was born to Burnell and Sonjia Wallace in New Orleans, Louisiana. He grew up in the Cut-Off section of the Algiers neighborhood of New Orleans. He attended O. Perry Walker High School, where he played football on both offense and defense and his teammates included future New Orleans Saints cornerback Keenan Lewis. After seeing limited offensive playing time as a junior (four receptions while playing mostly on defense), Wallace had an outstanding senior season, catching 60 passes for 1,039 yards with 19 touchdowns. He received first-team All-State honors as a wide receiver, and earned league and district MVP honors as well as All-League, All-Metro, All-West Bank and All-West Bank MVP following his senior season. He also returned four punts and four kickoffs for touchdowns, giving him 27 for the season and 162 points, with seven more scores called back due to penalties. Wallace set the school records for total points and kick return touchdowns.

Also a standout track & field athlete in high school, Wallace earned All-State honors in the 100-meter dash as a senior. As a junior, Wallace ran the anchor leg for the O.P. Walker 4 × 100 meter relay squad at the 2004 State Outdoor Championships, helping them earn a fourth-place finish with a school-record time of 41.81 seconds. In addition, he also owned a 4.4-second 40-yard dash and had a 36-inch vertical jump.

Wallace was rated as a two-star recruit by Rivals.com. SuperPrep named him the 17th-ranked college prospect in the state of Louisiana and selected him to its 2004 Southwest Team. Wallace was also named the league MVP, district MVP, and All-West Bank MVP. He was also named an All-State, All-League, All-Metro, and All-West Bank player. He committed to Oregon State on February 4, 2004.

== College career ==
In 2004, Wallace accepted a scholarship from Oregon State after insisting that they also recruit his best friend and high school teammate Keenan Lewis, who was one year ahead of Wallace in school. However, Wallace later decided not to join Lewis at Oregon State but instead to follow his high school coach, Frank Wilson, who had joined the coaching staff at the University of Mississippi.

As a true freshman in 2005, Wallace played in 10 games. In 2006, he started all 12 games as a split end. He recorded two touchdown receptions to tie for first on the team. At Alabama, he had his first career touchdown on a 55-yard catch from Brent Schaeffer.

In 2007, Wallace saw action in all 12 games with nine starts as a split end. He recorded 716 receiving yards and had two 100-yard games. He ranked first in the Southeastern Conference (SEC) in yards per catch with 18.8. He was named third-team All-SEC.

In 2008, he played in six games, recording 39 receptions for 784 yards and seven touchdowns. In the 2009 Cotton Bowl against Texas Tech, he caught a 41-yard touchdown pass from Jevan Snead. He once again led the SEC in yards per catch with 20.1. Wallace participated in the 2009 Senior Bowl on the South team.

== Professional career ==
=== Pre-draft ===
At the 2009 NFL Scouting Combine, Wallace finished second overall in the 40-yard dash with an official 4.33-second time.

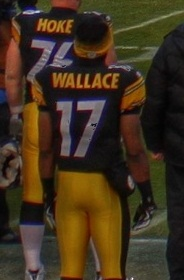
Wallace in 2009

Pre-draft measurables
Height	Weight	Arm length	Hand span	40-yard dash	10-yard split	20-yard split	20-yard shuttle	Three-cone drill	Vertical jump	Broad jump	Bench press
6 ft 0 3/8 in (1.84 m)	199 lb (90 kg)	31 3/8 in (0.80 m)	9 in (0.23 m)	4.33 s	1.56 s	2.54 s	4.27 s	6.90 s	40.0 in (1.02 m)	10 ft 9 in (3.28 m)	14 reps
All values from NFL Combine

=== Pittsburgh Steelers ===
==== 2009 season ====
The Pittsburgh Steelers selected Wallace in the third round (84th overall) of the 2009 NFL draft. Wallace was the 11th wide receiver chosen in the draft. On June 18, 2009, Wallace signed a three-year contract with the Steelers worth $1.740 million which included a $555,000 signing bonus. In Pittsburgh he was reunited with former high school teammate Keenan Lewis, whom the Steelers selected just twelve picks after Wallace.

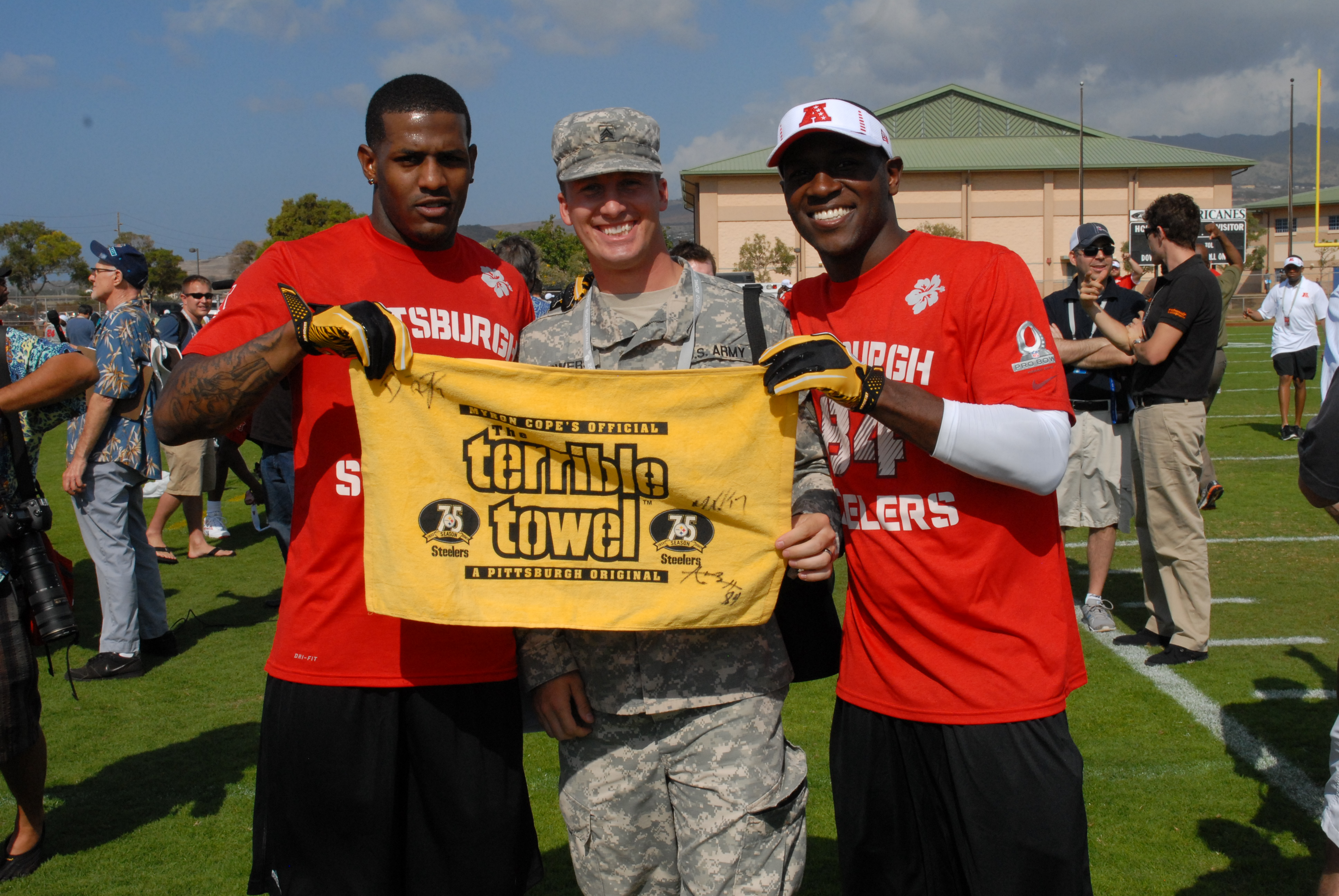
Wallace (left) with a soldier and Antonio Brown during Pro Bowl practice

Wallace achieved his first 100-yard receiving game against the Cincinnati Bengals in Week 3 of the 2009 season; he had 7 receptions for 102 yards. On December 20, Wallace caught a game winning pass while falling out of bounds as time expired to defeat the Green Bay Packers, 37–36. The catch made him a hero in Pittsburgh and the receiver was named the winner of the "Joe Greene Great Performance Award", which is awarded each season to the outstanding Steelers rookie. It was only his second catch of the game, but the first had been a 60-yard touchdown reception on the very first Steelers offensive snap.

Wallace finished his rookie season with 39 receptions for 756 receiving yards and six receiving touchdowns. He led the entire league in average yards per reception with 19.4 yards.

==== 2010 season ====
Following his promising rookie season and Santonio Holmes' trade to the New York Jets, Wallace was moved up the depth chart in 2010 to the #2 receiver spot behind Hines Ward. In Week 3, he had three receptions for 100 yards and two touchdowns in the 38–13 victory over the Tampa Bay Buccaneers. In Week 10, against the New England Patriots, he had eight receptions for 136 receiving yards and two receiving touchdowns. He closed out the regular season with three consecutive games going over the 100-yard mark.

In 2010, Wallace had a standout second season with the Steelers, establishing himself as one of the NFL's elite wideouts with 1,257 yards receiving (third most in the AFC) and 10 touchdowns. Wallace led the NFL with seven 100-yard receiving games.

Wallace averaged 21.0 yards per catch in 2010, the most of any AFC receiver. Wallace just missed becoming the third receiver in NFL history to lead the league in yardage per reception in his first two seasons after leading with 19.4 as a rookie. DeSean Jackson of Philadelphia averaged 22.5 yards per catch in 2010.

During Super Bowl XLV against the Green Bay Packers, Wallace had nine catches for 89 yards and a touchdown. He recorded a tackle after an interception from quarterback Ben Roethlisberger. It was Wallace's first and only Super Bowl appearance.

==== 2011 season ====
Wallace had three consecutive productive outings to start the 2011 season with 107 yards against Baltimore, 126 yards and a touchdown against Seattle, and 144 yards and a touchdown against Indianapolis. Against the Arizona Cardinals in Week 7, he and Roethlisberger connected for a 95-yard touchdown reception, becoming the longest in Steelers history. Wallace had two receiving touchdowns against the Cincinnati Bengals in Week 13.

Wallace finished the season with eight touchdown receptions, 1,193 receiving yards and 72 receptions for an average total of 16.6 yards per catch. The Steelers were eliminated in the Wild Card Round of the playoffs by the Denver Broncos 29–23. Wallace finished the game with only three receptions and 29 receiving yards. He did, however, score a rushing touchdown in the third quarter. He was named to the Pro Bowl. He was ranked 47th by his fellow players on the NFL Top 100 Players of 2012.

==== 2012 season ====
After the 2011 season, Wallace held out from all of the team's OTAs, and held out the majority of training camp. He reported on August 28, 2012.

Wallace started off the 2012 season with three consecutive games with a touchdown, including a 123-yard game against Oakland in Week 3. In Week 4, against San Diego, he had seven receptions for 112 receiving yards and two receiving touchdowns in the 34–24 loss. He finished the 2012 season with 64 receptions for 836 receiving yards and eight receiving touchdowns. Wallace became a free agent at the conclusion of the 2012 season.

=== Miami Dolphins ===
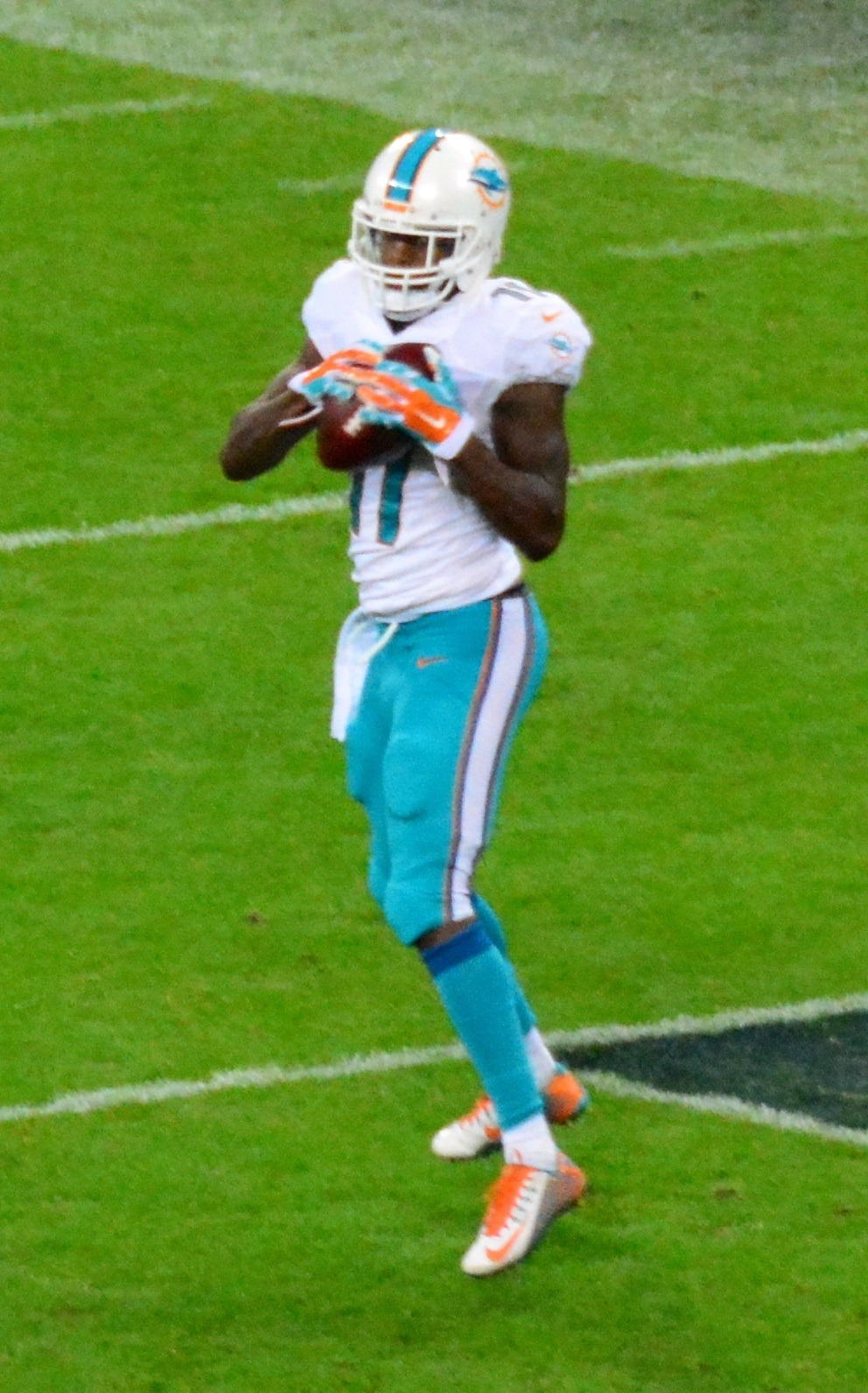
Wallace with the Miami Dolphins in 2014

On March 12, 2013, Wallace was reportedly signed by the Miami Dolphins in a five-year deal worth $60 million. Wallace's father revealed that, despite that the Minnesota Vikings offered a bigger contract, Mike decided to move his home to a warmer Miami. Wallace had four games going over the 100-yard mark in the 2013 season, finishing with 73 receptions for 930 receiving yards and five receiving touchdowns.

In Week 16 of the 2014 season, Wallace had two receiving touchdowns against the Minnesota Vikings in the 37–35 victory. In the 2014 season, Wallace had 67 receptions for 862 receiving yards and ten receiving touchdowns.

=== Minnesota Vikings ===
On March 13, 2015, the Dolphins traded Wallace and a 2015 seventh-round pick to the Minnesota Vikings in exchange for a 2015 fifth-round pick (Jay Ajayi).

Wallace caught his first touchdown pass as a Viking in Week 4 against the Denver Broncos.

On March 8, 2016, Wallace was released by the Vikings. He had 39 receptions for 473 yards in his only season in Minnesota.

=== Baltimore Ravens ===
On March 15, 2016, Wallace signed a two-year, $11.5 million contract with the Baltimore Ravens. In the Ravens' season opener against the Buffalo Bills, he scored his team's only touchdown off a 66-yard catch and run, as he and the Ravens won 13–7. The following week, he scored two touchdowns in a 20-point comeback victory over the Cleveland Browns. In Week 7, he had ten receptions for 120 receiving yards against the New York Jets. In Week 9, against his former team the Pittsburgh Steelers, Wallace caught a 95-yard touchdown from Joe Flacco in a 21–14 victory. He finished the 2016 season with 72 receptions for 1,017 receiving yards and four receiving touchdowns.

In Week 5 of the 2017 season, Wallace had three receptions for 133 receiving yards in the 30–17 victory over the Oakland Raiders. In Week 13, against the Detroit Lions, he had five receptions for 116 receiving yards in the 44–20 victory. In the 2017 season, Wallace appeared in 15 games and started 14. He had 52 receptions for 748 receiving yards and four receiving touchdowns.

=== Philadelphia Eagles ===
On March 22, 2018, Wallace signed a one-year, $2.5 million contract with the Philadelphia Eagles. In Week 2, against the Tampa Bay Buccaneers, Wallace suffered a fractured fibula and was expected to miss a few weeks. He was placed on injured reserve on September 19. He was activated off injured reserve on December 24.

== NFL career statistics ==
Year	Team	Games		Receiving					Rushing					Fumbles	
Year	Team	GP	GS	Rec	Yds	Avg	Lng	TD	Att	Yds	Avg	Lng	TD	Fum	Lost
2009	PIT	16	4	39	756	19.4	60T	6	5	48	9.6	21	0	1	1
2010	PIT	16	16	60	1,257	21.0	56T	10	5	39	7.8	19	0	1	0
2011	PIT	16	14	72	1,193	16.6	95T	8	5	57	11.4	21	0	1	1
2012	PIT	15	14	64	836	13.1	82T	8	5	7	1.4	13	0	2	1
2013	MIA	16	16	73	930	12.7	57	5	3	33	11.0	13	0	0	0
2014	MIA	16	16	67	862	12.9	50	10	4	16	4.0	12	0	2	1
2015	MIN	16	12	39	473	12.1	34	2	1	6	6.0	6	0	0	0
2016	BAL	16	16	72	1,017	14.1	95T	4	5	31	6.2	13	0	1	0
2017	BAL	15	14	52	748	14.4	66	4	1	4	4.0	4	0	0	0
2018	PHI	2	2	0	0	0.0	0	0	0	0	0.0	0	0	0	0
Career		144	124	538	8,072	15.0	95T	57	34	241	7.1	21	0	8	4
