= L.B. Landry College and Career Preparatory High School =

High school in New Orleans, Louisiana

L. B. Landry College and Career Preparatory High School
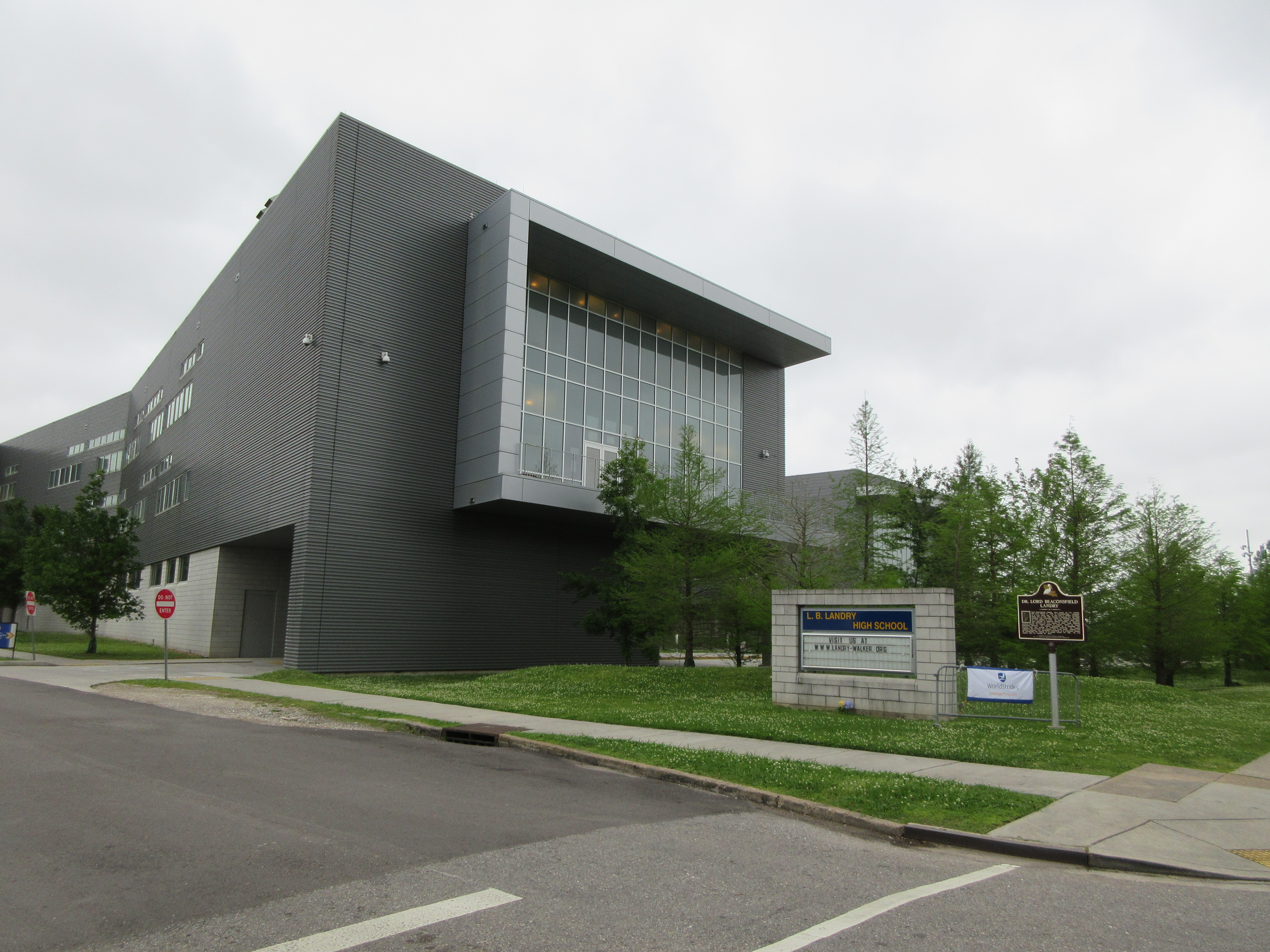
- Landry School in 2016

Location
- 1200 L. B. Landry Avenue; New Orleans, Louisiana 70114; United States; 29.9424227°N 90.0419955°W

Information
- School type: Public Charter
- Opened: 2013
- Campus type: Urban
- Colors: Royal blue, white and gold
- Athletics: LHSAA
- Mascot: Buccaneers
- Nickname: Buccaneers

L. B. Landry College and Career Preparatory High School is a charter high school on the west bank of Orleans Parish in Algiers, New Orleans, Louisiana. L. B. Landry High School, a secondary school in the Whitney area of Algiers, New Orleans, Louisiana, preceded it.

== History ==
L. B. Landry School was named after Lord Beaconsfield Landry (1878–1934), an African American activist, physician, and vocalist who lived in Algiers. The L. B. Landry School, originally an elementary school, opened on October 26, 1938. In 1942, it became a high school. It also was the first high school in Louisiana to be named after an African-American. It was the first high school on the west bank of New Orleans to enroll African-Americans regardless of income level. In 1952, it became a joint junior/senior high school. The main building was destroyed by a fire in 1958 and was rebuilt in 1959. In 1969, an annex opened. It contained an assembly hall, a theater, and 22 classrooms.

In 2005, Hurricane Katrina caused the school to close. The hurricane resulted in mold, rain, and wind-related damages in the school's building. Lentz said that there were few people who expected Landry to re-open. The architectural firm Eskew+Dumez+Ripple designed the new school. A 214,000-square-foot (19,900 m^{2}) replacement campus, with a price tag of almost $54 million in federal disaster funds, was designed to withstand winds of up to 130 miles (210 km) per hour, and solar panels are on the roof. The three-story campus was built with two gymnasiums, a space for a health center, and an auditorium with 650 seats.

The Recovery School District (RSD) stated that the school would open with four grade levels instead of beginning with one level, so its size would be justified. The school would take grades 7 through 10. In two years, the 7th and 8th grades would be phased out, replaced with grades 11 and 12. As of April 2010 the school collected over 200 applications for the ninth grade. The school re-opened in 2010. During the beginning of the first post-Katrina year of operation, there were reports of poor discipline and administrative turmoil. Mark Waller of the Times Picayune reported that teachers and students said that by October 2010 the school order dramatically improved. In December 2010, Louisiana State University opened a health clinic at Landry, replacing two smaller, temporary health clinics.

In the Spring of 2011, the school had 750 students in grades 7 through 10.

In October 2012 plans were announced to merge Walker High School and L. B. Landry High School into the new Landry Building and the campus would take the name of Walker High. The alumni of Landry High filed a lawsuit against the state, accusing it of ignoring a 2011 statute that asks the district to create a community outreach plan before finalizing "on any proposed changes in school governance" and unfairly calling Landry "low performing." The lawsuit was filed in District Civil Court in August 2012. The Associated Press stated "The case could be the first test of a law that requires community input on any changes in the way state-controlled schools are governed." Effective in the fall of 2013, the two schools merged onto the L. B. Landry High School campus.

L. B. Landry High School notable alumni (1942–2012)

- Alvin Haymond, NFL cornerback
- Rich Jackson, NFL defensive end
- Lance Louis, NFL offensive guard
- Bobby Mitchell, blues singer
- James Ray, NBA power forward
- Cyril Richardson, NFL offensive guard (he transferred before his sophomore season)
- Virgil Robinson, NFL running back

=== O. Perry Walker High School history ===
O. Perry Walker College and Career Preparatory High School and Community Center was a high school on the west bank of Orleans Parish in Algiers, New Orleans, Louisiana. The school opened in 1970, was named after New Orleans School Superintendent Oliver Perry Walker (1899–1968). It was originally controlled by New Orleans Public Schools.

In 2005, as Hurricane Katrina was about to make landfall, the New Orleans Regional Transit Authority (RTA) designated O. Perry Walker as a place where people could receive transportation to the Louisiana Superdome, a shelter of last resort.

In 2012, the Associated Press stated that Walker was a "relatively high-performing school".

In October 2012 plans were announced to merge Walker High School and L. B. Landry High School into the new Landry Building and the campus would take the name of Walker High. Effective in the fall of 2013, the school merged on the rebuilt L. B. Landry High School campus.

O. Perry Walker High School notable alumni (1970–2012)

- Patricia Clarkson (Class of 1977), actress
- Shannon Clavelle, NFL defensive end
- Milton Collins, CFL defensive back
- Craig Davis, NFL wide receiver
- Anthony Johnson, NFL defensive end
- Robert Kelley, NFL running back
- Keenan Lewis, NFL cornerback
- Kendrick Lewis, NFL free safety
- Bo McCalebb, overseas professional basketball player
- Ray Nagin, former mayor of New Orleans
- Ralph Norwood, NFL offensive tackle
- Chris Oldham, NFL cornerback (he transferred before his senior season)
- Mike Wallace, NFL wide receiver

=== Landry–Walker Preparatory High School ===
In 2013, the school was named Landry–Walker Preparatory High School after the merger of L. B. Landry High School and O. Perry Walker College and Career Preparatory High School on the L. B. Landry High School campus. It was named after Lord Beaconsfield Landry (1878–1934) and former New Orleans Public School Superintendent, O. Perry Walker (1899–1968). The school's athletics nickname was the Charging Buccaneers, derived from the O. Perry Walker's Chargers nickname and L.B. Landry's Buccaneers nickname.

=== L. B. Landry College and Career Preparatory High School ===
In 2021, the school was renamed L. B. Landry College and Career Preparatory High School, removing O. Perry Walker from the school name. Walker, a former New Orleans Public School Superintendent, supported segregation and his name was removed after a vote by the Algiers Charter School system.

L. B. Landry College and Career Preparatory High School notable alumni (2021–present)

- Cyrus Allen (Class of 2021), NFL wide receiver for the Kansas City Chiefs

== Athletics ==
L. B. Landry College and Career Preparatory athletics competes in the LHSAA.

=== State championships ===
Landry–Walker Preparatory
Football: 2016

L. B. Landry
Football: 1959
