= Anthony Madison =

American football player (born 1981)

No. 37, 35, 30
- Position: Cornerback

Personal information
- Born: October 8, 1981 (age 45); Thomasville, Alabama, U.S.
- Listed height: 5 ft 9 in (1.75 m)
- Listed weight: 180 lb (82 kg)

Career information
- College: Alabama
- NFL draft: 2006: undrafted

Career history
- Pittsburgh Steelers (2006); Tampa Bay Buccaneers (2007); Pittsburgh Steelers (2007–2008); Cleveland Browns (2009); Indianapolis Colts (2009); Pittsburgh Steelers (2009–2010); Detroit Lions (2011); Pittsburgh Steelers (2011)

Awards and highlights
- Super Bowl champion (XLIII)

Career NFL statistics
- Total tackles: 81
- Sacks: 1
- Fumble recoveries: 2
- Pass deflections: 1
- Interceptions: 1
- Stats at Pro Football Reference

Anthony David Madison (born October 8, 1981) is an American former professional football player who was a defensive back in the National Football League (NFL). He played college football for the Alabama Crimson Tide and was signed by the Pittsburgh Steelers as an undrafted free agent in 2006. He appeared in two Super Bowls and winning Super Bowl XLIII.

== Early life ==
Madison went to high school in Thomasville. He played quarterback, wide receiver, running back, defensive back and returned kicks. He was a two-time all-state pick. Rivals top 100 and was considered by many to be a Charlie Ward type athlete. He received numerous scholarship offers from the likes of Auburn, Ole Miss and LSU but ultimately choosing to play for The University of Alabama. His high school career stats include 14 interceptions and over 4,000 yards of offense. He was considered a top basketball player, where he earned all state honors.

== College career ==
Madison played his collegiate football at the University of Alabama. He was 3-year starter playing in 50 games with 140 tackles, 5 interceptions, and 30 passes defensed. He led the team in interceptions and pass breakups his junior season. He earned team awards such as: Committed to Excellence, Most improved Corner, Jerry Duncan I Like to Practice Award and Charlie Compton Award, which is given to the player who exemplifies faith and hard work. He earned All Bowl Team (2005) honorable mention All SEC (2005). He completed his bachelor's in 3 1/2 years in business Marketing. May 2016 he earned a master's degree in mental health counseling at California State University, Fullerton. He is married and resides in Southern California.

== Professional career ==
Anthony Madison is a Super bowl winning cornerback who participated in Super Bowl 43 and 45. He also boast 2 AFC Championships.

=== Pittsburgh Steelers ===
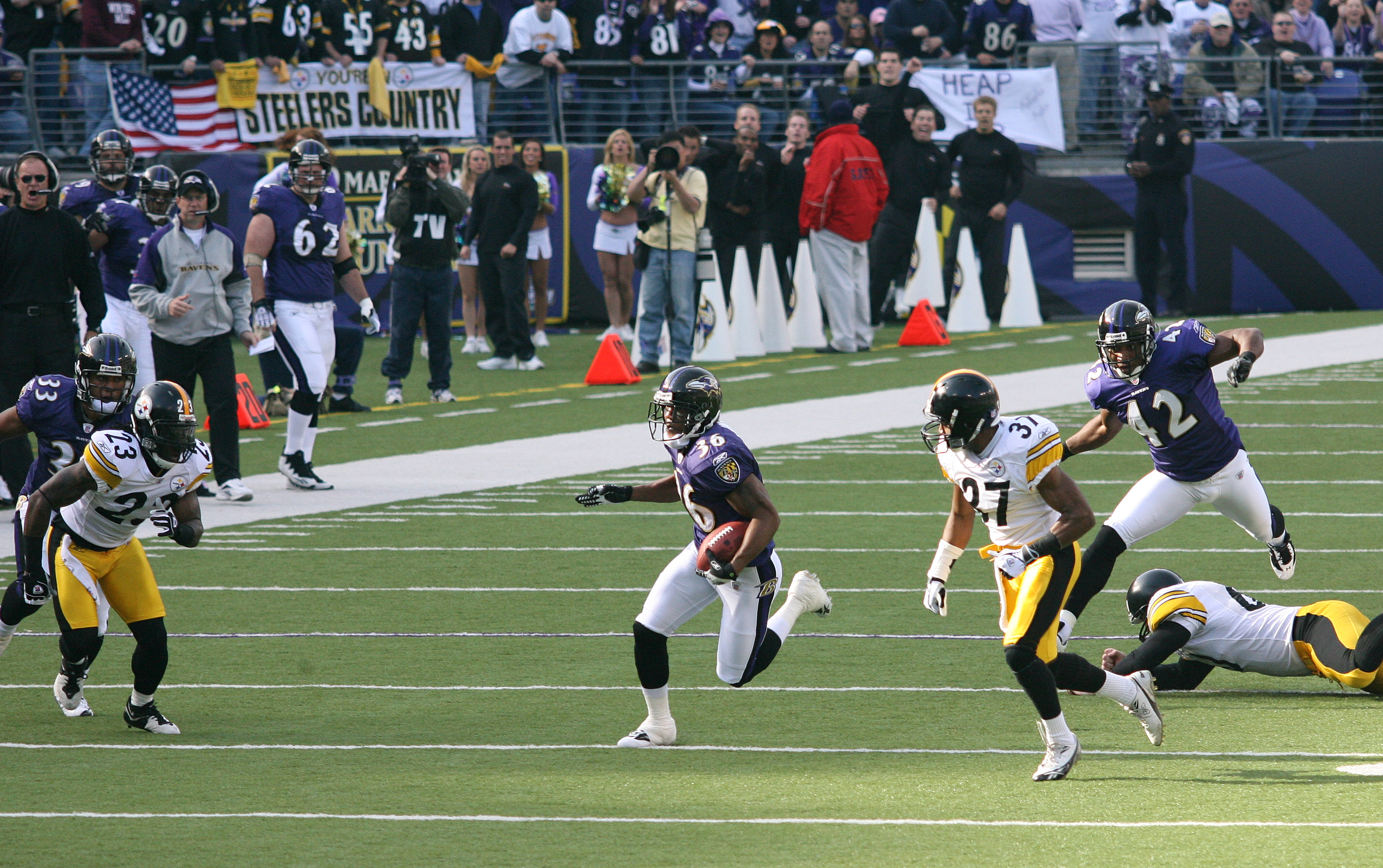
Madison (37) playing against the Baltimore Ravens in 2006.

Madison was signed as an undrafted free agent by the Pittsburgh Steelers in 2006. He spent the first 4 weeks of the 2006 season on the practice squad before he was added to the active roster to fill a hole in the lineup left by the injury of cornerback Ricardo Colclough. His rookie season statistics include 12 tackles (10 solo) in 13 games.

=== Tampa Bay Buccaneers ===
Madison played for the Tampa Bay Buccaneers during the 2006 season.

=== Pittsburgh Steelers (second stint) ===
Madison re-signed with the Steelers in 2007. In 2008, Madison played in every game for the Steelers including Super Bowl XLIII, where he collected 2 solo tackles and added a team high 32 special teams tackles. He was named A pro bowl alternate for special teams.

=== Cleveland Browns ===
Madison signed with the Cleveland Browns on September 22, 2009. He was waived on November 3.

=== Indianapolis Colts ===
Madison was signed by the Indianapolis Colts on November 10, 2009. He was waived on December 1.

=== Pittsburgh Steelers (third stint) ===
Madison was claimed off waivers by the Pittsburgh Steelers on December 2, 2009. He was crowned AFC Champion and advanced to the Super bowl where they lost to Green Bay Packers. He led the team in special teams tackles with 28 and recorded an interception during the season.

=== Detroit Lions ===
On August 13, 2011, Madison signed with the Detroit Lions, but was released on September 3. He was re-signed by Detroit on September 27 and released on November 7 along with Eldra Buckley to make room for free agent signings Leonard Davis and Kevin Smith (running back).

=== Pittsburgh Steelers (fourth stint) ===
On January 2, 2012, Madison re-signed with Pittsburgh for the playoffs, which would be the final game of his career. He retired during the offseason of 2012.
