= Ra'Shon Harris =

American gridiron football player (born 1986)

No. 77
- Position: Defensive end

Personal information
- Born: August 26, 1986 (age 40); Pensacola, Florida, U.S.
- Listed height: 6 ft 5 in (1.96 m)
- Listed weight: 300 lb (136 kg)

Career information
- High school: Pittsburg (CA)
- College: Oregon
- NFL draft: 2009: 6th round, 205th overall pick

Career history
- Pittsburgh Steelers (2009)*; Carolina Panthers (2009); Pittsburgh Steelers (2009); Buffalo Bills (2010)*; Pittsburgh Steelers (2010–2011)*; Houston Texans (2011−2012); Edmonton Eskimos (2014)*
- * Offseason or practice squad member only

Career NFL statistics
- Total tackles: 2
- Stats at Pro Football Reference

Ra'Shon Lamar "Sunny" Harris (born August 26, 1986) is an American former professional football player who was a defensive end in the National Football League (NFL). He played college football for the Oregon Ducks and was selected by the Pittsburgh Steelers in the sixth round of the 2009 NFL draft.

Harris was also a member of the Carolina Panthers, Buffalo Bills, Houston Texans, and Edmonton Eskimos.

== Early life ==
Harris was rated among the top 50 prep prospects in California by SuperPrep magazine as well as one of the best 11 defensive linemen in the state. He was a Two-time All-Bay Valley League defender and a Two-time All-area honoree (Contra Costa Times) and Tacoma News Tribune Western 100 pick. As a senior, he led the league in quarterback sacks (5), in addition to forcing one fumble and recovering another and completed his prep career with 15 quarterback sacks.

== College years ==
In 2008, he was a first-year starter at the University of Oregon and finished year as team's 10th-leading tackler with 47 and tops among interior linemen in tackles for lost with 9. He also had three sacks. He shared team's top bench press pinnacle (415 lbs.) regardless of position in addition to equaling best power clean mark (341 lbs.) among team's defensive linemen. In 2007, he played in 12 of 13 games and made 15 tackles with three for a loss. In 2006, he was expected to vie for opportunity to provide a major contribution before a torn triceps muscle during fall camp was thought to end the year before it started. He was able to return for the final six games of the season Harris was credited with a single-game high two tackles against Portland State in season debut, and logged one quarterback sack for a 10-yard loss vs. Washington. In 2005, he played all 12 games, recording no tackles and was named scout team's defensive player of the week for aiding preparations vs. Washington. The previous season, 2004, he was recognized as scout team's defensive player of the week for aiding preparations heading into UCLA game.

== Professional career ==
Pre-draft measurables
Height	Weight	40-yard dash	10-yard split	20-yard split	20-yard shuttle	Three-cone drill	Vertical jump	Broad jump	Bench press	Wonderlic
6 ft 3 3/4 in (1.92 m)	296 lb (134 kg)	4.88 s	1.64 s	2.89 s	4.66 s	8.18 s	27 in (0.69 m)	10 ft 10 in (3.30 m)	28 reps	14
Dash, shuffle from Pro Day. Other values from NFL Combine

=== Pittsburgh Steelers (first stint) ===
Harris was selected by the Pittsburgh Steelers in the sixth round of the 2009 NFL draft with the 205th overall pick. He was waived during final cuts on September 4.

=== Carolina Panthers ===
Harris was claimed off waivers by the Carolina Panthers on September 6, 2009. He made his regular season debut against the Atlanta Falcons, recording one assisted tackle. After playing two games for the Panthers, the team waived Harris on October 1 to make room for veteran defensive tackle Hollis Thomas. The Panthers re-signed Harris to the practice squad on October 3.

=== Pittsburgh Steelers (second stint) ===
Harris was signed off the Panthers practice squad on October 14, 2009 by the Pittsburgh Steelers, the team that drafted him. Harris replaced Aaron Smith, who went on injured reserve. He was waived on September 4, 2010.

=== Buffalo Bills ===
Harris was claimed off waivers by the Buffalo Bills on October 6, 2010 and placed on their practice squad.

=== Pittsburgh Steelers (third stint) ===
The Steelers signed Harris to their practice squad on November 3, 2010 after defensive end Al Woods was signed off their practice squad by the Tampa Bay Buccaneers.

=== Houston Texans ===
Harris was signed to the practice squad of the Houston Texans on November 23, 2011. He was waived/injured on August 27, 2012 and placed on injured reserve the next day. He was released on July 22, 2013.

=== Edmonton Eskimos ===
Harris signed with the Edmonton Eskimos on June 12, 2014. He was released on June 21, 2014.
