= Tyler Grisham =

American football player and coach (born 1987)

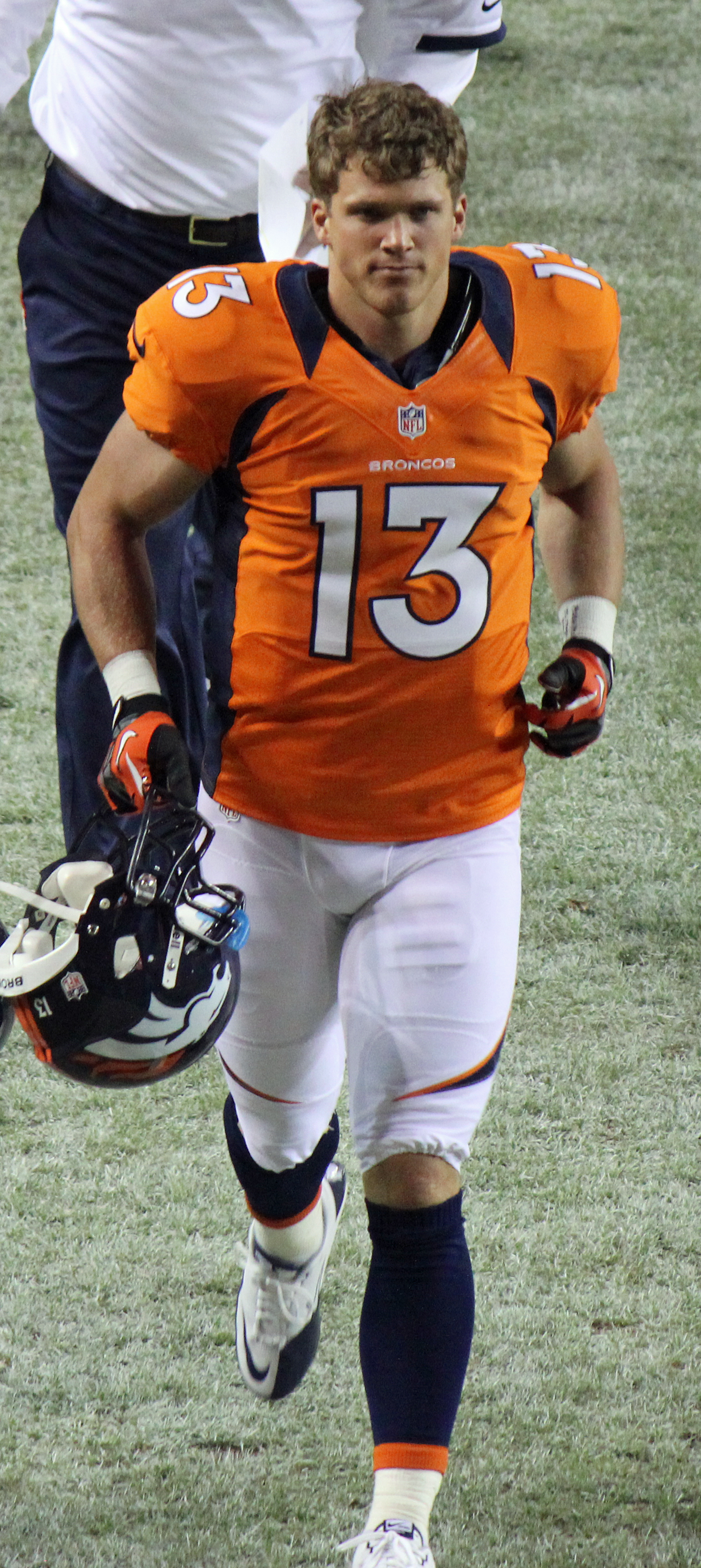
- Grisham with the Denver Broncos in 2012

Clemson Tigers
- Title: Wide receivers coach

Personal information
- Born: June 11, 1987 (age 39); Birmingham, Alabama, U.S.
- Listed height: 5 ft 11 in (1.80 m)
- Listed weight: 185 lb (84 kg)

Career information
- High school: Spain Park (Hoover, Alabama)
- College: Clemson
- NFL draft: 2009: undrafted

Career history

Playing
- Pittsburgh Steelers (2009–2011); Denver Broncos (2012)

Coaching
- Clemson (2014–2015) Graduate assistant; Clemson (2016–2019) Offensive analyst; Clemson (2020–present) Wide receivers coach

Awards and highlights
- As coach: 2× CFP national champion (2016, 2018)

Career NFL statistics
- Receptions: 1
- Receiving yards: 14
- Stats at Pro Football Reference

Tyler Grisham (born June 11, 1987) is an American football coach and former wide receiver who is currently the wide receivers coach at Clemson University.

== College career ==
Grisham played college football at Clemson from 2005 to 2009. He finished his college career with 132 career receptions for 1,390 yards and eight touchdowns.

== Professional career ==
Pre-draft measurables
Height	Weight	40-yard dash	10-yard split	20-yard split	20-yard shuttle	Three-cone drill	Vertical jump	Broad jump	Bench press
5 ft 10 1/8 in (1.78 m)	184 lb (83 kg)	4.65 s	1.60 s	2.66 s	4.18 s	6.85 s	34.0 in (0.86 m)	9 ft 6 in (2.90 m)	8 reps
All values from Pro Day

=== Pittsburgh Steelers ===
After the completion of his college football career, Grisham was signed by the Pittsburgh Steelers as a free agent after going undrafted in the 2009 NFL draft. He spent the first 12 games of the 2009 NFL season on the Steelers practice squad, and was added to the 53-man roster on December 10, 2009 after an injury to another receiver. Grisham made his first NFL reception on December 27, 2009 against the Baltimore Ravens for 14 yards, resulting in a first down.

Following the 2010 preseason, he was cut on September 4 when the Steelers set their 53-man roster. He was then signed to their practice squad on September 6 and finished the season in that roster status.

In 2011, Grisham was waived as part of the final cuts to the 53-man roster on September 2, but was added to the Steelers' practice squad on September 4 and again stayed in that roster status for the remainder of the season.

Grisham spent the 2010 and 2011 seasons on the Steelers' practice squad.

=== Denver Broncos ===
Grisham signed a futures contract with the Denver Broncos in 2012, but was cut during the preseason.

== Coaching career ==
In 2019, Grisham was named the Clemson Tigers’ new wide receivers coach, replacing Jeff Scott, who accepted the job to be South Florida’s new head football coach.
