= Andre Frazier =

American football player (born 1982)

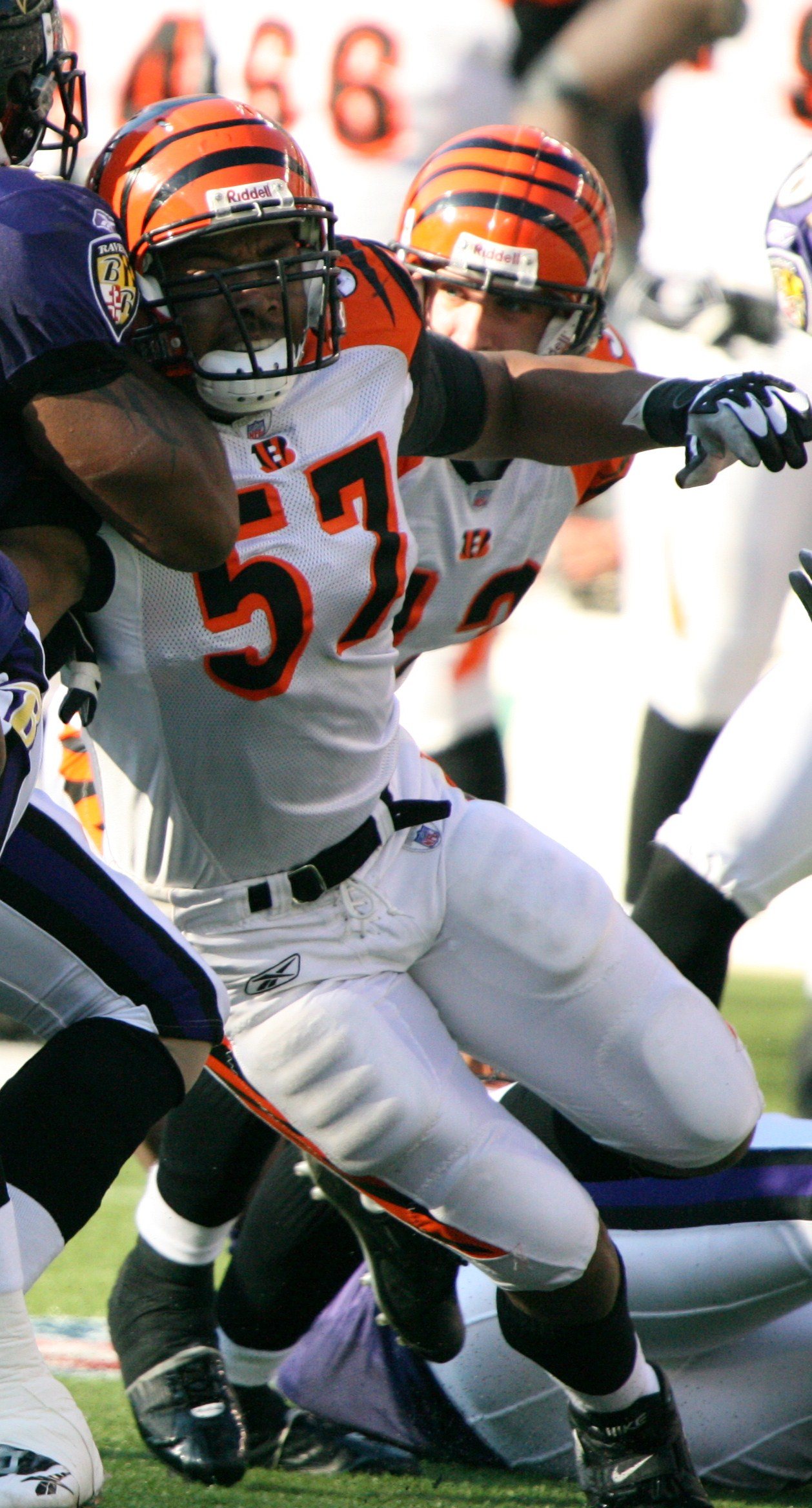
- Frazier with the Cincinnati Bengals in 2006

No. 94, 57, 54
- Position: Linebacker

Personal information
- Born: June 29, 1982 (age 44); Cincinnati, Ohio, U.S.
- Listed height: 6 ft 5 in (1.96 m)
- Listed weight: 245 lb (111 kg)

Career information
- High school: Hughes Center (Cincinnati)
- College: Cincinnati
- NFL draft: 2005: undrafted

Career history
- Pittsburgh Steelers (2005); Cincinnati Bengals (2006–2007); Pittsburgh Steelers (2007–2009)

Awards and highlights
- 2× Super Bowl champion (XL, XLIII); Conference USA All-Freshman (2001); 2× First-team All-Conference USA (2003–2004)

Career NFL statistics
- Total tackles: 58
- Sacks: 2
- Forced fumbles: 1
- Fumble recoveries: 1
- Stats at Pro Football Reference

Andre Frazier (born June 29, 1982) is an American former professional football player who was a linebacker for five seasons in the National Football League (NFL). He was signed by the Steelers as an undrafted free agent in 2005. He played college football for the Cincinnati Bearcats.

Frazier earned two Super Bowl rings with the Steelers in Super Bowl XL and Super Bowl XLIII. He has also played for the Cincinnati Bengals. He is the son of former NFL linebacker Guy Frazier.

== Early life ==
Frazier attended Hughes Center High School in Cincinnati, Ohio, and was a letterman in football. He was a two-time first-team All-City honoree, and helped lead his team to two League Titles. Andre Frazier graduated from Hughes High School in 2000.

== College career ==
Frazier played his college football at the University of Cincinnati from 2000 to 2004. He earned University of Cincinnati 2004 Strothman Award for academic and athletic excellence.

== Professional career ==
=== Pittsburgh Steelers (first stint) ===
Frazier signed with the Pittsburgh Steelers as an undrafted free agent. He was activated from the practice squad to the regular 53-man roster prior to the first game. He played in 11 of the team's games, primarily on special teams. Frazier suffered a debilitating fibula fracture in the 2006 AFC Championship game VS the Denver Broncos, however he celebrated on the sideline as his team defeated the Seattle Seahawks in Super Bowl XL and he received a Super Bowl XL Championship ring.

Prior to the start of the 2006 season, Frazier was cut by the Steelers.

=== Cincinnati Bengals ===
On September 28, 2006, Frazier was signed by his hometown team, the Cincinnati Bengals. During the 2007 NFL season, Frazier was a member of the Cincinnati Bengals for the first two games of the season. However, after a devastating loss to the Cleveland Browns, Cincinnati released Frazier.

=== Pittsburgh Steelers (second stint) ===
After being let go by Cincinnati, Frazier was re-signed by the Steelers. An unrestricted free agent in the 2009 offseason, Frazier was re-signed to a two-year, $1.375 million contract with a $125,000 signing bonus on March 12. On August 12, 2010, Frazier was placed on injured reserve with a knee injury.

== Personal life ==
Andre Frazier's father, Guy Frazier was a linebacker for the Cincinnati Bengals and Buffalo Bills.

Both father and son were rookies when their respective teams made it to the Super Bowl, though only Andre's team was victorious. When Guy was asked how he felt about his son winning a Super Bowl Championship, he replied, "A father always wants to see his son do better than himself. Andre's victory is nothing less than a great accomplishment for him and an even greater source of pride for myself."
