= Derrick Richardson =

American football player (born 1986)

No. 30
- Position: Safety

Personal information
- Born: April 3, 1986 (age 40); Denver, Colorado, U.S.
- Listed height: 5 ft 10 in (1.78 m)
- Listed weight: 201 lb (91 kg)

Career information
- College: New Mexico State
- NFL draft: 2009: undrafted

Career history
- Pittsburgh Steelers (2009)*; Florida Tuskers (2009)
- * Offseason or practice squad member only

Derrick Richardson (born April 3, 1986) is an American former football safety for the Florida Tuskers of the United Football League (UFL). He was signed by the Pittsburgh Steelers as an undrafted free agent in 2009. He played college football at New Mexico State.

== Professional career ==
=== Pittsburgh Steelers ===
He was signed as a rookie free agent by the Pittsburgh Steelers on April 27, 2009. He was waived on August 31.
