= 2011 Pittsburgh Steelers season =

79th season in franchise history

- Owner: The Rooney Family
- General manager: Kevin Colbert
- Head coach: Mike Tomlin
- Offensive coordinator: Bruce Arians
- Defensive coordinator: Dick LeBeau
- Home stadium: Heinz Field

Results
- Record: 12–4
- Division place: 2nd AFC North
- Playoffs: Lost Wild Card Playoffs (at Broncos) 23–29 (OT)
- All-Pros: S Troy Polamalu (1st team); C Maurkice Pouncey (1st team)
- Pro Bowlers: 7: KR Antonio Brown; FS Ryan Clark; OLB James Harrison; SS Troy Polamalu; C Maurkice Pouncey; QB Ben Roethlisberger; WR Mike Wallace
- Team MVP: Antonio Brown
- Team ROY: Marcus Gilbert

The 2011 season was the Pittsburgh Steelers' 79th in the National Football League (NFL), their 12th under general manager Kevin Colbert and their fifth under head coach Mike Tomlin. The Steelers hoped to return to the Super Bowl and defend their AFC Championship title from 2010, but suffered a 29–23 overtime loss to the Denver Broncos in the Wild Card round of the playoffs. The Steelers played all of their home games at Heinz Field in Pittsburgh, Pennsylvania.

The Steelers' defense allowed the fewest points, passing yards, and total yards in the 2011 NFL season.

== Offseason ==
=== Players added ===
| Pos. | Player | 2010 Team |
|---|---|---|
| WR | Jerricho Cotchery | New York Jets |

=== Players lost ===
| Pos. | Player | 2011 Team |
|---|---|---|
| T | Flozell Adams | |
| DE | Nick Eason | Arizona Cardinals |
| WR | Antwaan Randle El | |
| TE | Matt Spaeth | Chicago Bears |

=== 2011 NFL draft ===
2011 Pittsburgh Steelers draft
| Round | Pick | Player | Position | College | Notes |
| 1 | 31 | Cameron Heyward * | Defensive end | Ohio State | |
| 2 | 63 | Marcus Gilbert | Offensive tackle | Florida | |
| 3 | 95 | Curtis Brown | Cornerback | Texas | |
| 4 | 128 | Cortez Allen | Cornerback | The Citadel | |
| 5 | 162 | Chris Carter | Inside linebacker | Fresno State | |
| 6 | 196 | Keith Williams | Offensive guard | Nebraska | |
| 7 | 232 | Baron Batch | Running back | Texas Tech | |
Made roster * Made at least one Pro Bowl during career

=== Undrafted free agents ===
| Name | Position | College |
|---|---|---|
| Ty Boyle | Defensive end | North Dakota |
| Niles Brinkley | Cornerback | Wisconsin |
| Corbin Bryant | Defensive end | Northwestern |
| Vaughn Charlton | Tight end/Fullback | Temple |
| Miguel Chavis | Tight end | Clemson |
| John Clay | Running back | Wisconsin |
| Anthony Gray | Nose tackle | Southern Miss |
| Brett Greenwood | Safety | Iowa |
| Eric Greenwood | Wide receiver | Idaho |
| Mario Harvey | Linebacker | Marshall |
| Terrence McCrae | Wide receiver | Ohio |
| Colin Miller | Center | Central Michigan |
| Adam Mims | Wide receiver | Furman |
| Armand Robinson | Wide receiver | Miami (OH) |
| Weslye Saunders | Tight end | South Carolina |
| Trevis Turner | Tackle | Abilene Christian |

== Staff ==
2011 Pittsburgh Steelers staff
| Front office: Chairman emeritus – Daniel M. Rooney; President – Arthur J. Rooney II; Vice president – Arthur J. Rooney, Jr.; Administration advisor – Chuck Noll; Administrative assistant – Diane Lowe; Business Office; Director of business – Mark Hart; Controller – Bob Tyler; Director of business & administration – Omar Khan; Business administration – Dan Ferens; Human relations/office coordinator – Geraldine Glenn; Assistant controller – Jodie Spagnolli; Administrative assistant – Kelly Serafin; Administrative assistant – Rebecca Mihalcik; Administrative assistant – Colleen Kimmel; Media Relations; Communications coordinator – Burt Lauten; Public relations/media manager – Nathan LoCascio; Administrative assistant – Emily Scerba; Intern – Ryan Scarpino; Community Relations; Community relations manager – Michele Rosenthal; Administrative assistant – Stacie Lawrence; Information Technology; Technology manager – Scott Phelps; IT/Network Support Technician – Jon Pugliano; Steelers.com/Steelers Digest; Editor – Bob Labriola; Assistant editor/website – Teresa Varley; Photography; Team photographer – Mike Fabus; Football Operations; General manager – Kevin Colbert; College scouting coordinator – Ron Hughes; Pro personnel coordinator – Brandon Hunt; Special assistant/pro and college personnel – Joe Greene; Pro/college scout – Phil Kreidler; College scout – Kelvin Fisher; College scout – Mark Gorscak; College scout – Bruce McNorton; College scout – Dan Rooney; College/pro scout – David Petett; BLESTO Scout – Mark Bruener; College personnel – Bill Nunn; Administrative assistant – Maureen Mannion; Administrative assistant – Karen Mercalde; Head coaches: Head coach – Mike Tomlin; Assistant head coach/defensive line – John Mitchell; Offensive coaches: Offensive coordinator – Bruce Arians; Quarterbacks – Randy Fichtner; Running backs – Kirby Wilson; Wide receivers – Scottie Montgomery; Tight ends – James Daniel; Offensive line – Sean Kugler; Offensive assistant – Harold Goodwin | Defensive coaches: Defensive coordinator – Dick LeBeau; Linebackers – Keith Butler; Defensive backs – Carnell Lake; Defensive assistant – Jerry Olsavsky; Special teams coaches: Special Teams Coordinator– Al Everest; Assistant special teams – Amos Jones; Strength and conditioning: Conditioning coach – Garrett Giemont; Conditioning assistant – Marcel Pastoor; Player development – Raymond Jackson; Administrative assistant – Chrissy Bulger; Administrative assistant – Mia Daudet; Medical Staff; Physician, internal medicine – Dr. Mark Duca; Physician, internal medicine – Dr. Tony Yates; Physician, neurosurgery – Dr. Joseph Maroon; Physician, orthopedic surgery – Dr. James P. Bradley; Athletic Training Staff; Head athletic trainer – John Norwig; Assistant athletic trainer – Ryan Grove; Assistant athletic trainer – Sonia Gysland; Football Equipment Staff; Equipment manager - Rodgers Freyvogel; Field manager/assistant equipment manager – Patrick Noone; Video; Video coordinator – Bob McCartney; Video assistant – Andy Lizanich; Video assistant – Jason McMann |

== Final roster ==
2011 Pittsburgh Steelers roster
| Quarterbacks (QB): 16 Charlie Batch; 10 Dennis Dixon; 7 Ben Roethlisberger; Running backs (RB): 38 John Clay; 34 Rashard Mendenhall; 21 Mewelde Moore; 33 Isaac Redman; Wide receivers (WR): 81 Arnaz Battle; 84 Antonio Brown; 89 Jerricho Cotchery; 88 Emmanuel Sanders; 17 Mike Wallace; 86 Hines Ward; Tight ends (TE): 85 David Johnson; 83 Heath Miller; 82 Weslye Saunders | Offensive linemen (OL): 79 Trai Essex G/T; 73 Ramon Foster G; 77 Marcus Gilbert T; 68 Chris Kemoeatu G; 64 Doug Legursky G/C; 69 Jamon Meredith T; 53 Maurkice Pouncey C; 72 Jonathan Scott T; 78 Max Starks T; Defensive linemen (DL): 98 Casey Hampton NT; 97 Cameron Heyward DE; 96 Ziggy Hood DE; 99 Brett Keisel DE; 90 Steve McLendon NT; 65 Al Woods NT | Linebackers (LB): 54 Chris Carter OLB; 51 James Farrior ILB; 50 Larry Foote ILB; 92 James Harrison OLB; 57 Mortty Ivy ILB; 55 Stevenson Sylvester ILB; 94 Lawrence Timmons ILB; 56 LaMarr Woodley OLB; 93 Jason Worilds OLB; Defensive backs (DB): 28 Cortez Allen CB; 26 Will Allen SS; 25 Ryan Clark FS; 42 Da'Mon Cromartie-Smith SS; 22 William Gay CB; 23 Keenan Lewis CB; 20 Bryant McFadden CB; 29 Ryan Mundy FS; 43 Troy Polamalu SS; 24 Ike Taylor CB; Special teams (ST): 13 Jeremy Kapinos P; 6 Shaun Suisham K; 60 Greg Warren LS | Practice squad: 95 Corbin Bryant NT; 19 Tyler Grisham WR; 66 Elisha Joseph DE; 45 Jamie McCoy TE; 62 John Malecki G; 71 Chris Scott T; 30 Chad Spann RB; 67 Trevis Turner T; Reserve: 35 Baron Batch RB (IR); 31 Curtis Brown CB (IR); -- Miguel Chavis TE (IR); -- Erik Clanton ILB (IR); 74 Willie Colon T (IR); 27 Jonathan Dwyer RB (IR); 76 Chris Hoke NT (IR); 4 Byron Leftwich QB (IR); 9 Daniel Sepulveda P (IR); 91 Aaron Smith DE (IR); Rookies in italics 53 active, 10 reserve, 8 practice squad |

== Preseason ==
=== Schedule ===
| Week | Date | Opponent | Result | Record | Game site | NFL.com recap |
|---|---|---|---|---|---|---|
| 1 | August 12 | at Washington Redskins | L 7–16 | 0–1 | FedExField | Recap |
| 2 | August 18 | Philadelphia Eagles | W 24–14 | 1–1 | Heinz Field | Recap |
| 3 | August 27 | Atlanta Falcons | W 34–16 | 2–1 | Heinz Field | Recap |
| 4 | September 1 | at Carolina Panthers | W 33–17 | 3–1 | Bank of America Stadium | Recap |

== Regular season ==
=== Schedule ===
| Week | Date | Opponent | Result | Record | Game site | NFL.com recap |
|---|---|---|---|---|---|---|
| 1 | September 11 | at Baltimore Ravens | L 7–35 | 0–1 | M&T Bank Stadium | Recap |
| 2 | September 18 | Seattle Seahawks | W 24–0 | 1–1 | Heinz Field | Recap |
| 3 | September 25 | at Indianapolis Colts | W 23–20 | 2–1 | Lucas Oil Stadium | Recap |
| 4 | October 2 | at Houston Texans | L 10–17 | 2–2 | Reliant Stadium | Recap |
| 5 | October 9 | Tennessee Titans | W 38–17 | 3–2 | Heinz Field | Recap |
| 6 | October 16 | Jacksonville Jaguars | W 17–13 | 4–2 | Heinz Field | Recap |
| 7 | October 23 | at Arizona Cardinals | W 32–20 | 5–2 | University of Phoenix Stadium | Recap |
| 8 | October 30 | New England Patriots | W 25–17 | 6–2 | Heinz Field | Recap |
| 9 | November 6 | Baltimore Ravens | L 20–23 | 6–3 | Heinz Field | Recap |
| 10 | November 13 | at Cincinnati Bengals | W 24–17 | 7–3 | Paul Brown Stadium | Recap |
| 11 | Bye | | | | | |
| 12 | November 27 | at Kansas City Chiefs | W 13–9 | 8–3 | Arrowhead Stadium | Recap |
| 13 | December 4 | Cincinnati Bengals | W 35–7 | 9–3 | Heinz Field | Recap |
| 14 | December 8 | Cleveland Browns | W 14–3 | 10–3 | Heinz Field | Recap |
| 15 | December 19 | at San Francisco 49ers | L 3–20 | 10–4 | Candlestick Park | Recap |
| 16 | December 24 | St. Louis Rams | W 27–0 | 11–4 | Heinz Field | Recap |
| 17 | January 1 | at Cleveland Browns | W 13–9 | 12–4 | Cleveland Browns Stadium | Recap |

=== Standings ===
AFC North
| | W | L | T | PCT | DIV | CONF | PF | PA | STK |
|---|---|---|---|---|---|---|---|---|---|
| ^{(2)} Baltimore Ravens | 12 | 4 | 0 | .750 | 6–0 | 9–3 | 378 | 266 | W2 |
| ^{(5)} Pittsburgh Steelers | 12 | 4 | 0 | .750 | 4–2 | 9–3 | 325 | 227 | W2 |
| ^{(6)} Cincinnati Bengals | 9 | 7 | 0 | .563 | 2–4 | 6–6 | 344 | 323 | L1 |
| Cleveland Browns | 4 | 12 | 0 | .250 | 0–6 | 3–9 | 218 | 307 | L6 |

=== Game summaries ===
==== Week 1: at Baltimore Ravens ====
Week One: Pittsburgh Steelers at Baltimore Ravens – Game summary

| Quarter | 1 | 2 | 3 | 4 | Total |
|---|---|---|---|---|---|
| Steelers | 0 | 7 | 0 | 0 | 7 |
| Ravens | 14 | 7 | 11 | 3 | 35 |

at M&T Bank Stadium, Baltimore, Maryland

- Date: September 11
- Game time: 1:00 p.m. EDT
- Game weather: 75 °F (24 °C), Partly Cloudy
- Game attendance: 71,434
- Referee: Tony Corrente (99)
- TV announcers (CBS): Jim Nantz and Phil Simms
- Game Book

Game information

First quarter

- Ravens 7–0 – A. Boldin 27 Yard Pass from J. Flacco (B. Cundiff Kick) (13:28)
- Ravens 14–0 – R. Rice 1 Yard Run (B. Cundiff Kick) (1:49)

Second quarter

- Ravens 14–7 – E. Sanders 11 Yard Pass from B. Roethlisberger (S. Suisham Kick) (10:23)
- Ravens 21–7 – R. Rice 11 Yard Pass from J. Flacco (B. Cundiff Kick) (1:48)

Third quarter

- Ravens 29–7 – E. Dickson 18 Yard Pass from J. Flacco (S. Koch Run) (14:39)
- Ravens 32–7 – B. Cundiff 29 Yard Field Goal (2:50)

Fourth quarter

- Ravens 35–7 – B. Cundiff 30 Yard Field Goal (1:56)

Top passers

- PIT – B. Roethlisberger (22/41, 280 Yds, 1 TD, 3 INT)
- BAL – J. Flacco (17/29, 224 Yds, 3 TD, 0 INT)

Top rushers

- PIT – R. Mendenhall (12 rushes, 45 Yds, 0 TD)
- BAL – R. Rice (19 rushes, 107 Yds, 1 TD)

Top receivers

- PIT – M. Wallace (8/11, 107 Yds, 0 TD)
- BAL – A. Boldin (4/7, 74 Yds, 1 TD)

Top tacklers

- PIT – L. Timmons (10 tackles, 2 assists)
- BAL – L. Webb (9 tackles, 2 assists, 0.5 sack)

The Steelers opened up their regular season on the road against their old AFC North division rivals, the Baltimore Ravens. The Ravens scored quickly on their first drive, when only three plays into the game, Baltimore wide receiver Anquan Boldin caught a 27-yard touchdown pass from quarterback Joe Flacco. The Ravens scored again on the ensuing drive when running back Ray Rice ran in a 1-yard touchdown, putting Baltimore on top 14–0 early in the first quarter. The Steelers battled back on the next drive, driving down to the Ravens 11-yard line. Pittsburgh scored on a third-and-goal play when wide receiver Emmanuel Sanders caught a touchdown in the back of the end zone from quarterback Ben Roethlisberger. The Ravens responded by scoring again, this time on an 11-yard pass from Flacco to Rice. At halftime the Ravens led 21–7, just like in the 2010 playoffs. But unlike that game, the Ravens did not let up their dominance in the second half. On Pittsburgh's first play from scrimmage in the second quarter, Ravens defensive lineman Haloti Ngata stripped Roethlisberger of the football and recovered it at the Steelers 18-yard line. The Ravens scored yet again when tight end Ed Dickson caught an 18-yard touchdown pass from Joe Flacco. A two-point conversion by punter/holder Sam Koch put the Ravens on top 29–7. The Ravens never looked back, and put up two more Billy Cundiff field goals to close out the game 35–7. The Steelers finished with 7 turnovers in the game. The loss marked the Steelers first opening day loss in 8 years, and left Pittsburgh at the bottom of the division with an 0–1 record.

==== Week 2: vs. Seattle Seahawks ====
Week Two: Seattle Seahawks at Pittsburgh Steelers – Game summary

| Quarter | 1 | 2 | 3 | 4 | Total |
|---|---|---|---|---|---|
| Seahawks | 0 | 0 | 0 | 0 | 0 |
| Steelers | 7 | 10 | 7 | 0 | 24 |

at Heinz Field, Pittsburgh, Pennsylvania

- Date: September 18
- Game time: 1:00 p.m. EDT
- Game weather: 63 °F (17 °C), (Partly Cloudy)
- Game attendance: 63,663
- Referee: Bill Leavy (127)
- TV announcers (Fox): Kenny Albert, Daryl Johnston and Tony Siragusa
- Game Book

Game information

First quarter

- Steelers 7–0 – R. Mendenhall 1 Yard Run (S. Suisham Kick) (3:28)

Second quarter

- Steelers 14–0 – I. Redman 20 Yard Run (S. Suisham Kick) (12:41)
- Steelers 17–0 – S. Suisham 20 Yard Field Goal (1:52)

Third quarter

- Steelers 24–0 – M. Wallace 2 Yard Pass from B. Roethlisberger (S. Suisham Kick) (3:30)

Fourth quarter No Scoring

Top passers

- SEA – T. Jackson (20/29, 159 Yds, 0 TD, 0 INT)
- PIT – B. Roethlisberger (22/30, 298 Yds, 1 TD, 0 INT)

Top rushers

- SEA – T. Jackson (3 rushes, 12 Yds, 0 TD)
- PIT – R. Mendenhall (19 rushes, 66 Yds, 1 TD)

Top receivers

- SEA – B. Obomanu (4/6, 35 Yds, 0 TD)
- PIT – M. Wallace (8/9, 126 Yds, 1 TD)

Top tacklers

- SEA – B. Browner (6 tackles, 1 assist)
- PIT – T. Polamalu (6 tackles, 2 assists, 1 sack)

Hoping to rebound from their Week 1 divisional loss to the Ravens, the Steelers played their home-opener against the Seattle Seahawks at Heinz Field. After a failed 4th and goal run on their first drive, Pittsburgh delivered the game's first punch with a 1-yard touchdown run from running back Rashard Mendenhall. This score on their second drive gave them the early lead. The Steelers added onto their lead in the second quarter with a 20-yard touchdown run from running back Isaac Redman, followed by a 20-yard field goal from kicker Shaun Suisham. Pittsburgh's offense made one last score in the third quarter with quarterback Ben Roethlisberger finding wide receiver Mike Wallace on a 2-yard touchdown pass. From there, the defense prevented any scoring attempt from Seattle's offense.

With the shutout win, the Steelers improved to 1–1.

==== Week 3: at Indianapolis Colts ====
Week Three: Pittsburgh Steelers at Indianapolis Colts – Game summary

| Quarter | 1 | 2 | 3 | 4 | Total |
|---|---|---|---|---|---|
| Steelers | 10 | 0 | 0 | 13 | 23 |
| Colts | 0 | 13 | 0 | 7 | 20 |

at Lucas Oil Stadium, Indianapolis, Indiana

- Date: September 25
- Game time: 8:20 p.m. EDT
- Game weather: 57 °F (14 °C), Light Rain (Dome closed)
- Game attendance: 66,309
- Referee: Terry McAulay (77)
- TV announcers (NBC): Al Michaels, Cris Collinsworth and Michele Tafoya
- Game Book

Game information

First quarter

- Steelers 3–0 – Shaun Suisham 48 Yard Field Goal (12:43)
- Steelers 10–0 – Mike Wallace 81 Yard Pass from Ben Roethlisberger (Shaun Suisham Kick) (3:29)

Second quarter

- Steelers 10–3 – Adam Vinatieri 21 Yard Field Goal (6:14)
- Tied 10–10 – Jamaal Anderson 47 Yard Fumble Return (Adam Vinatieri Kick) (1:46)
- Colts 13–10 – Adam Vinatieri 25 Yard Field Goal (0:15)

Third quarter

- No scoring plays

Fourth quarter

- Tied 13–13 – Shaun Suisham 44 Yard Field Goal (12:10)
- Steelers 20–13 – Troy Polamalu 16 Yard Fumble Return (Shaun Suisham Kick) (5:13)
- Tied 20–20 – Joseph Addai 6 Yard Run (Adam Vinatieri Kick) (2:09)
- Steelers 23–20 – Shaun Suisham 38 Yard Field Goal (0:04)

Top passers

- PIT – Ben Roethlisberger – 25/37, 364 yards, 1 TD, 1 INT
- IND – Kerry Collins – 13/29, 93 yards

Top rushers

- PIT – Rashard Mendenhall – 18 rushes, 37 yards
- IND – Joseph Addai – 17 rushes, 86 yards, 1 TD

Top receivers

- PIT – Mike Wallace – 5 receptions, 144 yards, 1 TD
- IND – Pierre Garçon – 6 receptions, 82 yards

Top tacklers

- PIT – James Harrison – 6 tackles, 1 assist, 1 sack
- IND – Pat Angerer – 11 tackles, 9 assists

Coming off their shutout home win over the Seahawks, the Steelers flew to Lucas Oil Stadium for a primetime game against the Indianapolis Colts on Sunday night (Pittsburgh's first primetime game of the year). Pittsburgh scored first in the first quarter with a 48-yard field goal by kicker Shaun Suisham, followed by quarterback Ben Roethlisberger finding wide receiver Mike Wallace on an 81-yard touchdown pass. The Colts answered in the second quarter with kicker Adam Vinatieri getting a 21-yard field goal, followed by defensive end Jamaal Anderson returning a Roethlisberger fumble caused by Dwight Freeney 47 yards for a touchdown. Vinatieri got another 25-yard field goal before the end of the half. After a scoreless third quarter, the Steelers regained the lead in the fourth quarter with a 44-yard field goal from Suisham, followed by safety Troy Polamalu returning a fumble forced by James Harrison 16 yards for a touchdown. However, Indianapolis replied with running back Joseph Addai getting a 6-yard touchdown run. Pittsburgh prevailed, however, with Shuisham hitting a game-winning 38-yard field goal with 4 seconds remaining.

With the win, the Steelers improved to 2–1.

==== Week 4: at Houston Texans ====
Week Four: Pittsburgh Steelers at Houston Texans – Game summary

| Quarter | 1 | 2 | 3 | 4 | Total |
|---|---|---|---|---|---|
| Steelers | 0 | 0 | 7 | 3 | 10 |
| Texans | 7 | 3 | 0 | 7 | 17 |

at Reliant Stadium, Houston, Texas

- Date: October 2
- Game time: 1:00 p.m. EDT/12:00 p.m. CDT
- Game weather: 75 °F (24 °C), Sunny
- Game attendance: 71,585
- Referee: Clete Blakeman (34)
- TV announcers (CBS): Greg Gumbel and Dan Dierdorf
- Game Book

Game information

First quarter

- Texans 7–0 – Owen Daniels 1 Yard Pass from Matt Schaub (Neil Rackers Kick) (4:05)

Second quarter

- Texans 10–0 – Neil Rackers 25 Yard Field Goal (2:33)

Third quarter

- Texans 10–7 – Rashard Mendenhall 3 Yard Run (Shaun Suisham Kick) (7:02)

Fourth quarter

- Tied 10–10 – Shaun Suisham 26 Yard Field Goal (14:57)
- Texans 17–10 – Arian Foster 42 Yard Run (Neil Rackers Kick) (12:02)

Top passers

- PIT – Ben Roethlisberger – 16/30, 206 Yards, INT
- HOU – Matt Schaub – 14/21, 138 Yards, TD

Top rushers

- PIT – Isaac Redman – 6 Rushes, 40 Yards
- HOU – Arian Foster – 30 Rushes, 155 Yards, 1 TD

Top receivers

- PIT – Mike Wallace – 4 Receptions, 77 Yards
- HOU – Owen Daniels – 5 Receptions, 69 Yards, 1 TD

Top tacklers

- PIT – Troy Polamalu – 8 tackles, 1 assist
- HOU – Jason Allen – 6 tackles, 1 INT

Coming off their Sunday night win over the Colts, the Steelers flew to Reliant Stadium in Houston for a duel with the Houston Texans. Pittsburgh trailed late in the first quarter when Texans quarterback Matt Schaub completed a 1-yard touchdown pass to tight end Owen Daniels. Houston would add onto their lead in the second quarter with kicker Neil Rackers getting a 25-yard field goal.

The Steelers finally answered in the third quarter with a 3-yard touchdown run from running back Rashard Mendenhall. Pittsburgh would tie the game in the fourth quarter with a 26-yard field goal from kicker Shaun Suisham, but the Texans retook the lead when running back Arian Foster got a 42-yard touchdown run. The Steelers were unable to rally, and Big Ben was intercepted on the Steelers' final drive.

With the loss, the Steelers fell to 2–2.

==== Week 5: vs. Tennessee Titans ====
Week Five: Tennessee Titans at Pittsburgh Steelers – Game summary

| Quarter | 1 | 2 | 3 | 4 | Total |
|---|---|---|---|---|---|
| Titans | 3 | 0 | 7 | 7 | 17 |
| Steelers | 7 | 14 | 7 | 10 | 38 |

at Heinz Field, Pittsburgh, Pennsylvania

- Date: October 9
- Game time: 1:00 p.m. EDT
- Game weather: 78 °F (26 °C), (Sunny)
- Game attendance: 63,875
- Referee: Walt Anderson (66)
- TV announcers (CBS): Greg Gumbel and Dan Dierdorf
- Game Book

Game information

First quarter

- Titans 3–0 – Rob Bironas 29 Yard Field Goal (8:21)
- Steelers 7–3 – Heath Miller 8 Yard Pass from Ben Roethlisberger (Shaun Suisham Kick) (3:00)

Second quarter

- Steelers 14–3 – Hines Ward 8 Yard Pass from Ben Rothelisberger (Shaun Suisham Kick) (11:14)
- Steelers 21–3 – David Johnson 8 Yard Pass from Ben Rothelisberger (Shaun Suisham Kick) (6:11)

Third quarter

- Steelers 28–3 – Hines Ward 5 Yard Pass from Ben Rothelisberger (Shaun Suisham Kick) (4:44)
- Steelers 28–10 – Chris Johnson 1 Yard Run (Rob Bironas Kick) (2:02)

Fourth quarter

- Steelers 31–10 – Shaun Suisham 19 Yard Field Goal (10:45)
- Steelers 31–17 – Damian Williams 19 Yard Pass from Matt Hasselbeck (Rob Bironas Kick) (3:32)
- Steelers 38–17 – Mike Wallace 40 Yard Pass from Ben Rothelisberger (Shaun Suisham Kick) (2:39)

Top passers

- TEN – Matt Hasselbeck – 29/49, 262 Yards, TD, INT
- PIT – Ben Roethlisberger – 24/34, 228 Yards, 5 TD, INT

Top rushers

- TEN – Chris Johnson – 14 Rushes, 51 Yards, TD
- PIT – Jonathan Dwyer – 11 Rushes, 107 Yards

Top receivers

- TEN – Nate Washington – 5 Receptions, 69 Yards
- PIT – Mike Wallace – 6 Receptions, 82 Yards, TD

Top tacklers

- TEN – Jason McCourty – 8 tackles, 6 assists
- PIT – James Farrior – 9 tackles, 4 assists

Hoping to rebound from their road loss to the Texans, the Steelers went home for a Week 5 intraconference duel with the Tennessee Titans. Pittsburgh trailed early in the first quarter as Titans kicker Rob Bironas got a 29-yard field goal, yet the Steelers answered with quarterback Ben Roethlisberger finding tight end Heath Miller on an 8-yard touchdown pass. Pittsburgh would add onto their lead in the second quarter with Roethlisberger hooking up with wide receiver Hines Ward and fullback David Johnson on a 7-yard and a 1-yard touchdown pass.

The Steelers continued their dominating day in the third quarter with Roethlisberger connecting with Ward again on a 5-yard touchdown pass. Tennessee responded with running back Chris Johnson getting a 1-yard touchdown run. Afterwards, the Steelers would pull away in the fourth quarter with a 19-yard field goal from kicker Shaun Suisham. The Titans tried to rally with quarterback Matt Hasselbeck completing a 19-yard touchdown pass to wide receiver Damian Williams, yet Pittsburgh closed out the game with Roethlisberger finding wide receiver Mike Wallace on a 40-yard touchdown pass.

With the win, the Steelers improved to 3–2.

==== Week 6: vs. Jacksonville Jaguars ====
Week Six: Jacksonville Jaguars at Pittsburgh Steelers – Game summary

| Quarter | 1 | 2 | 3 | 4 | Total |
|---|---|---|---|---|---|
| Jaguars | 0 | 3 | 7 | 3 | 13 |
| Steelers | 7 | 10 | 0 | 0 | 17 |

at Heinz Field, Pittsburgh, Pennsylvania

- Date: October 16
- Game time: 1:00 p.m. EDT
- Game weather: 60 °F (16 °C), (Cloudy)
- Game attendance: 62,934
- Referee: Ron Winter (14)
- TV announcers (CBS): Ian Eagle and Dan Fouts
- Game Book

Game information

First quarter

- Steelers 7–0 – Rashard Mendenhall 8 Yard Run (Shaun Suisham Kick) (4:23)

Second quarter

- Steelers 14–0 – Mike Wallace 28 Yard Pass from Ben Roethlisberger (Shaun Suisham Kick) (13:40)
- Steelers 17–0 – Shaun Suisham 21 Yard Field Goal (10:58)
- Steelers 17–3 – Josh Scobee 46 Yard Field Goal (8:44)

Third quarter

- Steelers 17–10 – Jason Hill 18 Yard Pass from Blaine Gabbert (Josh Scobee Kick) (1:46)

Fourth quarter

- Steelers 17–13 – Josh Scobee 45 Yard Field Goal (4:17)

Top passers

- JAC – Blaine Gabbert – 12/26, 109 Yards, TD
- PIT – Ben Roethlisberger – 12/23, 200 Yards, TD

Top rushers

- JAC – Maurice Jones-Drew – 22 Rushes, 96 Yards
- PIT – Rashard Mendenhall – 23 Rushes, 146 Yards, TD

Top receivers

- JAC – Mike Thomas – 4 Receptions, 36 Yards
- PIT – Mike Wallace – 2 Receptions, 76 Yards, TD

Top tacklers

- JAC – Paul Posluszny – 9 tackles, 7 assists
- PIT – James Farrior – 6 tackles, 5 assists, 1 sack

Coming off their home win over the Titans, the Steelers closed out their intraconference schedule at home in a Week 6 duel with the Jacksonville Jaguars. Pittsburgh delivered the game's opening punch in the first quarter with an 8-yard touchdown run from running back Rashard Mendenhall. The Steelers would add onto their lead in the second quarter with quarterback Ben Roethlisberger finding wide receiver Mike Wallace on a 28-yard touchdown pass, followed by a 21-yard field goal from kicker Shaun Suisham. The Jaguars would close out the half with kicker Josh Scobee making a 46-yard field goal.

Jacksonville crept closer in the third quarter with quarterback Blaine Gabbert completing an 18-yard touchdown pass to wide receiver Jason Hill. The Jaguars tried to rally in the fourth quarter with Scobee getting a 45-yard field goal, yet Pittsburgh's defense held on to preserve the victory.

With the win, the Steelers improved to 4–2.

==== Week 7: at Arizona Cardinals ====
Week Seven: Pittsburgh Steelers at Arizona Cardinals – Game summary

| Quarter | 1 | 2 | 3 | 4 | Total |
|---|---|---|---|---|---|
| Steelers | 7 | 10 | 9 | 6 | 32 |
| Cardinals | 0 | 7 | 7 | 6 | 20 |

at University of Phoenix Stadium, Glendale, Arizona

- Date: October 23
- Game time: 4:05 p.m. EDT/1:05 p.m. Arizona Time
- Game weather: 90 °F (32 °C)
- Game attendance: 62,475
- Referee: John Parry(132)
- TV announcers (CBS): Greg Gumbel and Dan Dierdorf
- Game Book

Game information

First quarter

- Steelers 7–0 – Heath Miller 12 Yard Pass from Ben Roethlisberger (Shaun Suisham Kick) (9:39)

Second quarter

- Steelers 14–0 – Mike Wallace 95 Yard Pass from Ben Rothelisberger (Shaun Suisham Kick) (8:09)
- Steelers 14–7 – Alfonso Smith 1 Yard Run (Jay Feely Kick) (1:20)
- Steelers 17–7 – Shaun Suisham 41 Yard Field Goal (0:00)

Third quarter

- Steelers 17–14 – LaRod Stephens-Howling 73 Yard Pass from Kevin Kolb (Jay Feely Kick) (9:26)
- Steelers 24–14 – Emmanuel Sanders 4 Yard Pass from Ben Rothelisberger (Shaun Suisham Kick) (3:54)
- Steelers 26–14 – Intentional Grounding called on Kevin Kolb in the End Zone (3:42)

Fourth quarter

- Steelers 29–14 – Shaun Suisham 42 Yard Field Goal (11:30)
- Steelers 32–14 – Shaun Suisham 39 Yard Field Goal (6:46)
- Steelers 32–20 – Early Doucet 2 Yard Pass from Kevin Kolb (2-pt Kevin Kolb pass failed) (3:53)

Top passers

- PIT – Ben Roethlisberger – 26/39, 361 Yards, 3 TD
- ARI – Kevin Kolb – 18/34, 272 Yards, 2 TD, INT

Top rushers

- PIT – Rashard Mendenhall – 13 Rushes, 32 Yards
- ARI – Beanie Wells – 12 Rushes, 42 Yards

Top receivers

- PIT – Mike Wallace – 3 Receptions, 118 Yards, TD
- ARI – Larry Fitzgerald – 4 Receptions, 78 Yards

Top tacklers

- PIT – LaMarr Woodley – 6 tackles, 1 assist, 2 sacks
- ARI – Richard Marshall, Patrick Peterson, & Daryl Washington – 7 tackles each

Coming off their win over the Jaguars, the Steelers flew to the University of Phoenix Stadium for a Week 7 interconference duel with the Arizona Cardinals, in a rematch of Super Bowl XLIII. Pittsburgh delivered the game's opening punch in the first quarter as quarterback Ben Roethlisberger found tight end Heath Miller on a 12-yard touchdown pass. The Steelers would add onto their lead in the second quarter with Roethlisberger hooking up with wide receiver Mike Wallace on a 95-yard touchdown pass. The Cardinals would answer with running back Alfonso Smith getting a 1-yard touchdown run. Pittsburgh would close out the half with a 41-yard field goal from kicker Shaun Suisham.

Arizona began the third quarter with quarterback Kevin Kolb completing a 73-yard touchdown pass to running back LaRod Stephens-Howling, yet the Steelers responded with Roethlisberger connecting to wide receiver Emmanuel Sanders on a 4-yard touchdown pass, along with Kolb getting called for intentional grounding in his endzone, resulting in a safety. In the fourth quarter, the Steelers continued to pull away with a 42-yard and a 39-yard field goal from Suisham. The Cardinals tried to rally with Kolb completing a 2-yard touchdown pass to wide receiver Early Doucet (with a failed two-point conversion), yet Pittsburgh held on to preserve the victory.

With the win, the Steelers improved to 5–2.

==== Week 8: vs. New England Patriots ====
Week Eight: New England Patriots at Pittsburgh Steelers – Game summary

| Quarter | 1 | 2 | 3 | 4 | Total |
|---|---|---|---|---|---|
| Patriots | 0 | 10 | 0 | 7 | 17 |
| Steelers | 7 | 10 | 3 | 5 | 25 |

at Heinz Field, Pittsburgh, Pennsylvania

- Date: October 30
- Game time: 4:15 p.m. EDT
- Game weather: 39 °F (4 °C), (Sunny)
- Game attendance: 64,424
- Referee: Mike Carey (94)
- TV announcers (CBS): Jim Nantz and Phil Simms
- Game Book

Game information

First quarter

- Steelers 7–0 – Mewelde Moore 5 Yard Pass from Ben Roethlisberger (Shaun Suisham Kick) (9:08)

Second quarter

- Steelers 10–0 – Shaun Suisham 33 Yard Field Goal (14:57)
- Steelers 10–7 – Deion Branch 2 Yard Pass from Tom Brady (Stephen Gostkowski Kick) (8:20)
- Steelers 17–7 – Antonio Brown 7 Yard Pass from Ben Rothelisberger (Shaun Suisham Kick) (2:41)
- Steelers 17–10 – Stephen Gostkowski 46 Yard Field Goal (0:29)

Third quarter

- Steelers 20–10 – Shaun Suisham 21 Yard Field Goal (6:11)

Fourth quarter

- Steelers 23–10 – Shaun Suisham 23 Yard Field Goal (11:26)
- Steelers 23–17 – Aaron Hernandez 1 Yard Pass from Tom Brady (Stephen Gostkowski Kick) (2:35)
- Steelers 25–17 – Fumble forced out of back of End Zone by Troy Polamalu (0:08)

Top passers

- NE – Tom Brady – 24/35, 198 Yards, 2 TD
- PIT – Ben Roethlisberger – 36/50, 365 Yards, 2 TD, 1 INT

Top rushers

- NE – Kevin Faulk – 6 Rushes, 32 Yards
- PIT – Rashard Mendenhall – 13 Rushes, 70 Yards

Top receivers

- NE – Rob Gronkowski – 7 Receptions, 94 Yards
- PIT – Heath Miller – 7 Receptions, 85 Yards

Top tacklers

- NE – Patrick Chung – 10 tackles, 3 assists
- PIT – Ike Taylor – 6 tackles

Coming off their road win over the Cardinals, the Steelers went home for a Week 8 duel with the New England Patriots. Pittsburgh delivered the game's opening punch in the first quarter as quarterback Ben Roethlisberger found running back Mewelde Moore on a 5-yard touchdown pass. The Steelers would add onto their lead in the second quarter with a 33-yard field goal from kicker Shaun Suisham. The Patriots answered with quarterback Tom Brady completing a 2-yard touchdown pass to wide receiver Deion Branch, yet Pittsburgh struck back with Roethlisberger connecting with wide receiver Antonio Brown on a 7-yard touchdown pass. New England would close out the half with kicker Stephen Gostkowski got a 46-yard field goal.

The Steelers began the third quarter with a 21-yard field goal from Suisham, followed by his 23-yard field goal in the fourth. The Patriots tried to rally as Brady completed a 1-yard touchdown pass to tight end Aaron Hernandez, yet Pittsburgh's defense held with safety Troy Polamalu forcing a New England fumble out of the back of the end zone for a safety.

With the win, the Steelers improved to 6–2 and also won their first game against the Patriots since 2008 and first game against the Patriots with Tom Brady as the starter since 2004. This would be the Steelers' final win against the Patriots until 2018.

==== Week 9: vs. Baltimore Ravens ====
Week Nine: Baltimore Ravens at Pittsburgh Steelers – Game summary

| Quarter | 1 | 2 | 3 | 4 | Total |
|---|---|---|---|---|---|
| Ravens | 3 | 6 | 7 | 7 | 23 |
| Steelers | 0 | 6 | 0 | 14 | 20 |

at Heinz Field, Pittsburgh, Pennsylvania

- Date: November 6
- Game time: 8:20 p.m. EST
- Game weather: 47 °F (8 °C), (Clear)
- Game attendance: 64,851
- Referee: Walt Coleman
- TV announcers (NBC): Al Michaels, Cris Collinsworth, Michele Tafoya

Game information

First quarter

- Ravens 3–0 – Billy Cundiff 18 Yard Field Goal (8:10)

Second quarter

- Tied 3–3 – Shaun Suisham 36 Yard Field Goal (14:05)
- Ravens 6–3 – Billy Cundiff 43 Yard Field Goal (9:28)
- Tied 6–6 – Shaun Suisham 30 Yard Field Goal (1:10)
- Ravens 9–6 – Billy Cundiff 51 Yard Field Goal (0:00)

Third quarter

- Ravens 16–6 – Ray Rice 4 Yard Run (Billy Cundiff Kick) (4:27)

Fourth quarter

- Ravens 16–13 – Rashard Mendenhall 1 Yard Run (Shaun Suisham Kick) (6:45)
- Steelers 20–16 – Mike Wallace 25 Yard Pass from Ben Roethlisberger (Shaun Suisham Kick) (4:59)
- Ravens 23–20 – Torrey Smith 26 Yard Pass from Joe Flacco (Billy Cundiff Kick) (0:08)

Top passers

- BAL – Joe Flacco – 28/47, 300 yards, TD
- PIT – Ben Roethlisberger – 20/37, 330 yards, TD, INT

Top rushers

- BAL – Ray Rice – 18 rushes, 43 yards, TD
- PIT – Rashard Mendenhall – 13 rushes, 52 yards, TD

Top receivers

- BAL – Anquan Boldin – 7 receptions, 88 yards
- PIT – Antonio Brown – 5 Receptions, 109 Yards

Top tacklers

- BAL – Lardarius Webb – 6 tackles
- PIT – James Harrison – 8 tackles

Following their victory over the Patriots, the Steelers remained at home the next week for their second match-up of the season against division rivals the Baltimore Ravens. The Ravens scored first with an 18-yard field goal by kicker Billy Cundiff, the only points scored in the first quarter by either team. Steelers kicker Shaun Suisham answered with a 36-yard field goal early in the second quarter, and a 30-yard field goal near the end, but both of these were quickly matched by Baltimore's Cundiff with a 43-yard and 51-yard field goal, respectively, giving Baltimore a 9–6 lead at halftime. The Ravens then increased their lead in the third quarter when Ray Rice scored the first touchdown of the game on a 4-yard run. The Steelers rallied hard in the fourth quarter, with running back Rashard Mendenhall making a 1-yard run to score a touchdown, and then taking the lead for the first time in the game when quarterback Ben Roethlisberger made a successful 25-yard pass to wide receiver Mike Wallace in the endzone for a second touchdown. On their final drive of the game, the Steelers were ready to potentially increase their lead with a 47-yard field goal kick by Shaun Suisham, but a 5-yard delay of game penalty put them out of field goal range and they were instead forced to punt the ball to the Ravens. The Ravens then began a 92-yard drive, culminating in a 26-yard touchdown pass by quarterback Joe Flacco to wide receiver Torrey Smith in the endzone with just 8 seconds remaining, giving them the game.

With the loss, the Steelers fell to 6–3.

==== Week 10: at Cincinnati Bengals ====
Week Ten: Pittsburgh Steelers at Cincinnati Bengals – Game summary

| Quarter | 1 | 2 | 3 | 4 | Total |
|---|---|---|---|---|---|
| Steelers | 14 | 3 | 7 | 0 | 24 |
| Bengals | 7 | 3 | 7 | 0 | 17 |

at Paul Brown Stadium, Cincinnati, Ohio

- Date: November 13
- Game time: 1:00 p.m. EST
- Game weather: 62 °F (17 °C), (Cloudy and Windy)
- Game attendance: 63,262
- Referee: Bill Leavy
- TV announcers (CBS): Ian Eagle and Dan Fouts

Game information

First quarter

- Steelers 7–0 – Jerricho Cotchery 16 Yard Pass from Ben Roethlisberger (Shaun Suisham Kick) (9:15)
- Steelers 14–0 – Rashard Mendenhall 2 Yard Run (Shaun Suisham Kick) (3:37)
- Steelers 14–7 – A. J. Green 36 Yard Pass from Andy Dalton (Mike Nugent Kick) (0:14)

Second quarter

- Steelers 14–10 – Mike Nugent 43 Yard Field Goal (12:02)
- Steelers 17–10 – Shaun Suisham 39 Yard Field Goal (0:58)

Third quarter

- Tied 17–17 – Jermaine Gresham 1 Yard Pass from Andy Dalton (Mike Nugent Kick) (8:38)
- Steelers 24–17 – Rashard Mendenhall 9 Yard Run (Shaun Suisham Kick) (1:55)

Fourth quarter

- No scoring plays

Top passers

- PIT – Ben Roethlisberger – 21/33, 245 yards, TD, INT
- CIN – Andy Dalton – 15/30, 170 yards, 2 TDs, 2 INTs

Top rushers

- PIT – Rashard Mendenhall – 16 Rushes, 44 Yards, 2 TDs
- CIN – Cedric Benson – 15 Rushes, 57 Yards

Top receivers

- PIT – Antonio Brown – 5 Receptions, 86 Yards
- CIN – Andrew Hawkins – 5 Receptions, 56 Yards

Top tacklers

- PIT – Troy Polamalu – 5 tackles, 1 assist
- CIN – Chris Crocker – 5 tackles, 2 assists

Hoping to rebound from their season-sweeping loss to the Ravens, the Steelers flew to Paul Brown Stadium for a Week 10 AFC North duel with the Cincinnati Bengals. Pittsburgh delivered the game's opening punch in the first quarter with quarterback Ben Roethlisberger finding wide receiver Jerricho Cotchery on a 16-yard touchdown pass, followed by a 2-yard touchdown run from running back Rashard Mendenhall. The Bengals would answer with quarterback Andy Dalton completing a 36-yard touchdown pass to wide receiver A. J. Green. Cincinnati struck again the second quarter with kicker Mike Nugent getting a 43-yard field goal, yet the Steelers responded with a 39-yard field goal from kicker Shaun Suisham.

The Bengals would tie the game in the third quarter with Dalton completing a 1-yard touchdown pass to tight end Jermaine Gresham, yet Pittsburgh came right back with a 9-yard touchdown run from Mendenhall. Afterwards, the defense would prevent any comeback attempt from Cincinnati.

With the win, the Steelers went into their bye week at 7–3.

==== Week 12: at Kansas City Chiefs ====
Week Twelve: Pittsburgh Steelers at Kansas City Chiefs – Game summary

| Quarter | 1 | 2 | 3 | 4 | Total |
|---|---|---|---|---|---|
| Steelers | 0 | 13 | 0 | 0 | 13 |
| Chiefs | 3 | 3 | 0 | 3 | 9 |

at Arrowhead Stadium, Kansas City, Missouri

- Date: November 27
- Game time: 8:20 p.m. EST/7:20 p.m. CST
- Game weather: 29 °F (−2 °C), (Clear)
- Game attendance: 72,173
- Referee: Ed Hochuli
- TV announcers (NBC): Al Michaels, Cris Collinsworth and Michele Tafoya

Game information

First quarter

- Chiefs 3–0 – Ryan Succop 41 Yard Field Goal (10:40)

Second quarter

- Tied 3–3 – Shaun Suisham 21 Yard Field Goal (13:29)
- Steelers 10–3 – Weslye Saunders 2 Yard Pass from Ben Roethlisberger (Shaun Suisham Kick) (10:53)
- Steelers 10–6 – Ryan Succop 49 Yard Field Goal (4:30)
- Steelers 13–6 – Shaun Suisham 49 Yard Field Goal (0:00)

Third quarter No scoring plays

Fourth quarter

- Steelers 13–9 – Ryan Succop 40 Yard Field Goal (7:11)

Top passers

- PIT – Ben Roethlisberger – 21/31, 193 yards, TD, INT
- KC – Tyler Palko – 18/28, 167 yards, 3 INT

Top rushers

- PIT – Rashard Mendenhall – 17 Rushes, 57 Yards
- KC – Thomas Jones – 13 Rushes, 37 Yards

Top receivers

- PIT – Antonio Brown – 4 Receptions, 81 Yards
- KC – Dwayne Bowe – 7 Receptions, 69 Yards

Top tacklers

- PIT – Ryan Mundy – 7 tackles, 3 assists
- KC – Derrick Johnson – 8 tackles, 1 assist

Coming off their bye week, the Steelers flew to Arrowhead Stadium for a Week 12 Sunday night showdown with the Kansas City Chiefs. Pittsburgh trailed early in the first quarter when Chiefs kicker Ryan Succop kicked a 41-yard field goal. Pittsburgh would answer in the second quarter with a 21-yard field goal from kicker Shaun Suisham following a Chiefs goal-line stand. The Steelers struck again when quarterback Ben Roethlisberger threw a 2-yard touchdown pass to rookie tight end Weslye Saunders. Succop and Shuisham each made 49-yard field goals before the end of the half to make it 13–6. The third quarter was scoreless, but in the 4th quarter Kansas City pulled closer when Succop booted a 40-yarder. This pulled the Chiefs to within 13–9. However, Pittsburgh's defense held on to preserve the victory as cornerback Keenan Lewis sealed the deal with an interception late in the 4th quarter with 29 seconds remaining.

With the win, the Steelers improved to 8–3.

==== Week 13: vs. Cincinnati Bengals ====
Week Thirteen: Cincinnati Bengals at Pittsburgh Steelers – Game summary

| Quarter | 1 | 2 | 3 | 4 | Total |
|---|---|---|---|---|---|
| Bengals | 0 | 7 | 0 | 0 | 7 |
| Steelers | 0 | 28 | 7 | 0 | 35 |

at Heinz Field, Pittsburgh, Pennsylvania

- Date: December 4
- Game time: 1:00 p.m. EST
- Game weather: 62 °F (17 °C), (Cloudy)
- Game attendance: 63,697
- Referee: Carl Cheffers
- TV announcers (CBS): Jim Nantz and Phil Simms

Game information

First quarter No Scoring Second quarter Steelers 7–0 – Rashard Mendenhall 3 Yard Run (Shaun Suisham Kick) (12:47)

Steelers 14–0 – Rashard Mendenhall 5 Yard Run (Shaun Suisham Kick) (10:12)

Steelers 21–0 – Mike Wallace 12 Yard Pass from Ben Roethlisberger (Shaun Suisham Kick) (8:33)

Steelers 21–7 – A. J. Green 11 Yard Pass from Andy Dalton (Mike Nugent Kick) (4:06)

Steelers 28–7 – Antonio Brown 60 Yard Punt Return (Shaun Suisham Kick) (1:16) Third quarter Steelers 35–7 – Mike Wallace 19 Yard Pass from Ben Roethlisberger (Shaun Suisham Kick) (3:26) Fourth quarter No Scoring

Top passers

- CIN – Andy Dalton – 11/24, 135 yards, 1 TD
- PIT – Ben Roethlisberger – 15/23, 176 yards, 2 TDs

Top rushers

- CIN – Cedric Benson – 13 Rushes, 52 Yards
- PIT – Rashard Mendenhall – 16 Rushes, 60 Yards, 2 TDs

Top receivers

- CIN – A. J. Green – 6 Receptions, 87 Yards, 1 TD
- PIT – Antonio Brown – 2 Receptions, 67 Yards

Top tacklers

- CIN – Rey Maualuga – 6 tackles
- PIT – Lawrence Timmons – 6 tackles, 2 assists

Coming off their Sunday night win over the Chiefs, the Steelers went home for a Week 13 AFC North rematch with the Cincinnati Bengals. In the first quarter, Cincinnati threatened to score after Bengals wide receiver A. J. Green caught a 43-yard pass from quarterback Andy Dalton. Tight end Jermaine Gresham appeared to catch a 7-yard touchdown pass from Dalton, but it was nullified because of a false start penalty on Green. The Bengals lined up for a field goal, but could not get the kick off in time, causing a delay of game. After the five-yard penalty, the Bengals lined up for the field goal again. But this time, Pittsburgh's Cameron Heyward blocked the field goal, giving the Steelers the ball around the 20-yard line. Pittsburgh could not capitalize however, and punted it away. The rest of the 1st quarter was scoreless. Then in the 2nd quarter, the Steelers began a scoring frenzy. The first of Pittsburgh's 4 touchdowns came when Rashard Mendenhall ran in a score from 3 yards out to give Pittsburgh a 7–0 lead. He scored again on the Steelers' next drive, this time from 5 yards out. Pittsburgh scored yet again on their following drive when Ben Roethlisberger threw a 12-yard touchdown pass to Mike Wallace. Down 21–0, the Bengals finally got into the end zone. After a long drive going 80 yards, Dalton threw an 11-yard touchdown pass to Green. Though the Bengals brought the game to within 21–7, the Steelers would not let up. Pittsburgh answered Cincinnati with a 60-yard punt return by Antonio Brown, This gave the Steelers a 28–7 lead going into halftime. In the 3rd Quarter, Pittsburgh scored one more time when Roethlisberger threw a 19-yard touchdown pass to Wallace. Afterwards, Pittsburgh's defense held Cincinnati to no scoring. Led by James Harrison, who finished the game with 3 sacks, they held Cincinnati to only 232 net yards.

With the win, the Steelers improved to 9–3.

==== Week 14: vs. Cleveland Browns ====
Week Fourteen: Cleveland Browns at Pittsburgh Steelers – Game summary

| Quarter | 1 | 2 | 3 | 4 | Total |
|---|---|---|---|---|---|
| Browns | 3 | 0 | 0 | 0 | 3 |
| Steelers | 7 | 0 | 0 | 7 | 14 |

at Heinz Field, Pittsburgh, Pennsylvania

- Date: December 8
- Game time: 8:20 p.m. EST
- Game weather: 30 °F (−1 °C), (Cloudy)
- Game attendance: 60,754
- Referee: Ed Hochuli
- TV announcers (NFLN): Brad Nessler, Mike Mayock, and Alex Flanagan

Game information

First quarter

- Browns 3–0 – Phil Dawson 20 Yard Field Goal (9:22)
- Steelers 7–3 – Jerricho Cotchery 11 Yard Pass from Ben Roethlisberger (Shaun Suisham Kick) (6:12)

Second quarter No scoring plays

Third quarter No scoring plays

Fourth quarter

- Steelers 14–3 – Antonio Brown 79 Yard Pass from Ben Roethlisberger (Shaun Suisham Kick) (2:52)

Top passers

- CLE – Colt McCoy – 18/35, 309 yards, 2 INT
- PIT – Ben Roethlisberger – 16/21, 280 yards, 2 TD, INT

Top rushers

- CLE – Chris Ogbonnaya – 2 Rushes, 31 Yards
- PIT – Rashard Mendenhall – 18 Rushes, 76 Yards

Top receivers

- CLE – Evan Moore – 4 Receptions, 55 Yards
- PIT – Antonio Brown – 5 Receptions, 151 Yards, TD

Top tacklers

- CLE – D'Qwell Jackson – 7 tackles, 6 assists
- PIT – Ryan Clark – 9 tackles, 1 assist

Coming off their season-sweeping win over the Bengals, the Steelers stayed at home, donned their throwback uniforms again, and played a Week 14 AFC North duel with the Cleveland Browns on Thursday night. Pittsburgh trailed early in the first quarter as Browns kicker Phil Dawson got a 20-yard field goal. The Steelers would answer with quarterback Ben Roethlisberger finding wide receiver Jerricho Cotchery on an 11-yard touchdown pass. After a scoreless second and third quarter (which saw Roethlisberger suffer a left high-ankle sprain near the end of the first half and yet returned for the start of the second), Pittsburgh pulled away in the fourth quarter with Roethlisberger hooking up with wide receiver Antonio Brown on a 79-yard touchdown pass.

Steelers defender James Harrison was suspended for 1 game after a helmet-to-helmet hit on Browns quarterback Colt McCoy in the fourth quarter.

With the win, the Steelers improved to 10–3.

As of the 2025 season, this is the last time the Steelers won against an AFC North opponent on a Thursday.

==== Week 15: at San Francisco 49ers ====
Week Fifteen: Pittsburgh Steelers at San Francisco 49ers – Game summary

| Quarter | 1 | 2 | 3 | 4 | Total |
|---|---|---|---|---|---|
| Steelers | 0 | 0 | 3 | 0 | 3 |
| 49ers | 3 | 3 | 7 | 7 | 20 |

at Candlestick Park, San Francisco, California

- Date: December 19
- Game time: 8:30 p.m. EST/5:30 p.m. PST (Game delayed until 9:00 p.m. EST/6:00 p.m. PST due to a power outage)
- Game weather: 51 °F (11 °C), (Clear)
- Game attendance: 69,732
- Referee: Walt Coleman
- TV announcers (ESPN): Mike Tirico, Ron Jaworski, and Jon Gruden

Game information

First quarter

- 49ers 3–0 – David Akers 22 Yard Field Goal (3:25)

Second quarter

- 49ers 6–0 – David Akers 38 Yard Field Goal (12:13)

Third quarter

- 49ers 6–3 – Shaun Suisham 51 Yard Field Goal (6:08)
- 49ers 13–3 – Vernon Davis 1 Yard Pass from Alex Smith (David Akers Kick) (3:44)

Fourth quarter

- 49ers 20–3 – Frank Gore 5 Yard Run (David Akers Kick) (9:06)

Top passers

- PIT – Ben Roethlisberger – 25/44, 330 Yards, 3 INT
- SF – Alex Smith – 18/31, 187 Yards, TD

Top rushers

- PIT – Rashard Mendenhall – 15 Rushes, 64 Yards
- SF – Frank Gore – 18 Rushes, 65 Yards, TD

Top receivers

- PIT – Jerricho Cotchery – 5 Receptions, 93 Yards
- SF – Vernon Davis – 6 Receptions, 72 Yards, TD

Top tacklers

- PIT – Troy Polamalu – 7 tackles
- SF – NaVorro Bowman – 7 tackles, 1 assist

Coming off their divisional home win over the Browns, the Steelers flew to Candlestick Park for a Week 15 interconference duel with the San Francisco 49ers on Monday night. The start of the game was delayed 30 minutes due to a transformer blew out power to the stadium. When the game started Pittsburgh trailed in the first half with 49ers kicker David Akers getting a 22-yard field goal in the first quarter, followed by a 38-yard field goal in the second quarter.

The Steelers would answer in the third quarter with a 51-yard field goal from kicker Shaun Suisham, but San Francisco came right back with quarterback Alex Smith completing a 1-yard touchdown pass to tight end Vernon Davis. The 49ers would pull away in the fourth quarter with running back Frank Gore getting a 5-yard touchdown run.

With the loss, Pittsburgh fell to 10–4.

==== Week 16: vs. St. Louis Rams ====
Week Sixteen: St. Louis Rams at Pittsburgh Steelers – Game summary

| Quarter | 1 | 2 | 3 | 4 | Total |
|---|---|---|---|---|---|
| Rams | 0 | 0 | 0 | 0 | 0 |
| Steelers | 3 | 7 | 3 | 14 | 27 |

at Heinz Field, Pittsburgh, Pennsylvania

- Date: December 24
- Game time: 1:00 p.m. EST
- Game weather: 37 °F (3 °C), (Cloudy)
- Game attendance: 60,081
- Referee: Clete Blakeman
- TV announcers (Fox): Dick Stockton and John Lynch

Game information

First quarter

- Steelers 3–0 – Shaun Suisham 21 Yard Field Goal (4:43)

Second quarter

- Steelers 10–0 – John Clay 10 Yard Run (Shaun Suisham Kick) (6:50)

Third quarter

- Steelers 13–0 – Shaun Suisham 49 Yard Field Goal (9:19)

Fourth quarter

- Steelers 20–0 – Rashard Mendenhall 1 Yard Run (Shaun Suisham Kick) (8:58)
- Steelers 27–0 – Isaac Redman 2 Yard Run (Shaun Suisham Kick) (3:14)

Top passers

- STL – Kellen Clemens – 9/24, 91 Yards
- PIT – Charlie Batch – 15/22, 208 Yards, INT

Top rushers

- STL – Steven Jackson – 24 Rushes, 103 Yards
- PIT – Rashard Mendenhall – 18 Rushes, 116 Yards, TD

Top receivers

- STL – Brandon Lloyd – 3 Receptions, 29 Yards
- PIT – Mike Wallace – 4 Receptions, 82 Yards

Top tacklers

- STL – James Laurinaitis – 7 tackles, 6 assists
- PIT – Lawrence Timmons – 7 tackles, 3 assists

Hoping to rebound from their road loss to the 49ers, the Steelers went home for a Week 16 interconference duel with the St. Louis Rams. With Ben Roethlisberger recovering from his left high ankle sprain, backup quarterback Charlie Batch got the start.

Pittsburgh delivered the game's opening punch in the first quarter with a 21-yard field goal from kicker Shaun Suisham. The Steelers added onto their lead in the second quarter with a 10-yard touchdown run from rookie running back John Clay, which was his first career carry.

Pittsburgh continued to increase their lead in the third quarter with a 49-yard field goal from Suisham. Afterwards, the Steelers pulled away in the fourth quarter with a 1-yard touchdown run from running back Rashard Mendenhall, followed by a 2-yard touchdown run from running back Isaac Redman.

With the shutout win, Pittsburgh improved to 11–4.

==== Week 17: at Cleveland Browns ====
Week Seventeen: Pittsburgh Steelers at Cleveland Browns – Game summary

| Quarter | 1 | 2 | 3 | 4 | Total |
|---|---|---|---|---|---|
| Steelers | 0 | 3 | 10 | 0 | 13 |
| Browns | 0 | 6 | 3 | 0 | 9 |

at Cleveland Browns Stadium, Cleveland, Ohio

- Date: January 1
- Game time: 4:15 p.m. EST
- Game weather: 40 °F (4 °C), (Cloudy with Snow)
- Game attendance: 68,266
- Referee: Alberto Riveron
- TV announcers (CBS): Kevin Harlan and Solomon Wilcots

Game information

First quarter

- No Scoring

Second quarter

- Browns 3–0 – Phil Dawson 26 Yard Field Goal (6:03)
- Browns 6–0 – Phil Dawson 45 Yard Field Goal (1:06)
- Browns 6–3 – Shaun Suisham 19 Yard Field Goal (0:00)

Third quarter

- Tied 6–6 – Shaun Suisham 29 Yard Field Goal (9:43)
- Steelers 13–6 – Isaac Redman 7 Yard Run (Shaun Suisham Kick) (5:27)
- Steelers 13–9 – Phil Dawson 49 Yard Field Goal (1:59)

Fourth quarter

- No Scoring

Top passers

- PIT – Ben Roethlisberger – 23/40, 221 yards
- CLE – Seneca Wallace – 16/41, 177 yards, INT

Top rushers

- PIT – Isaac Redman – 19 Rushes, 92 Yards, TD
- CLE – Seneca Wallace – 3 Rushes, 41 Yards

Top receivers

- PIT – Antonio Brown – 6 Receptions, 90 Yards
- CLE – Josh Cribbs – 7 Receptions, 91 Yards

Top tacklers

- PIT – Lawrence Timmons – 5 tackles
- CLE – D'Qwell Jackson – 9 tackles, 4 assists

Coming off their shutout home win over the Rams, the Steelers closed out the regular season at Cleveland Browns Stadium with a Week 17 AFC North rematch against the Cleveland Browns. After a scoreless first quarter, Pittsburgh trailed in the second quarter with Browns kicker Phil Dawson getting a 26-yard and a 45-yard field goal. The Steelers would close out the half with a 19-yard field goal from kicker Shaun Suisham.

Pittsburgh took the lead in the third quarter with a 29-yard field goal from Suisham, followed by a 7-yard touchdown run from running back Isaac Redman. Cleveland responded with Dawson making a 49-yard field goal, yet the defense prevented the Browns from getting any other score.

With the win, the Steelers concluded their regular season with a 12–4 record and would acquire the AFC's #5 seed.

== Postseason ==
=== Schedule ===
| Week | Date | Kickoff (ET) | Opponent | Result | Game site | TV | NFL Recap |
|---|---|---|---|---|---|---|---|
| Wild Card | January 8 | 4:30 p.m. | at Denver Broncos (4) | L 23–29 (OT) | Sports Authority Field at Mile High | CBS | Recap |

=== Postseason game summaries ===
==== AFC Wild Card: at #4 Denver Broncos ====
Wild Card : Pittsburgh Steelers at Denver Broncos – Game summary

| Quarter | 1 | 2 | 3 | 4 | OT | Total |
|---|---|---|---|---|---|---|
| Steelers | 6 | 0 | 7 | 10 | 0 | 23 |
| Broncos | 0 | 20 | 0 | 3 | 6 | 29 |

at Sports Authority Field at Mile High, Denver, Colorado

- Date: January 8
- Game time: 4:30 p.m. EST/2:30 p.m. MST
- Game weather: 40 °F (4 °C), Sunny
- Game attendance: 75,970
- Referee: Ron Winter
- TV announcers (CBS): Jim Nantz and Phil Simms
- Game Book

Game information

First quarter

- Steelers 3–0 – Shaun Suisham 45 Yard Field Goal (11:14)
- Steelers 6–0 – Shaun Suisham 38 Yard Field Goal (0:23)

Second quarter

- Broncos 7–6 – Eddie Royal 30 Yard Pass from Tim Tebow (Matt Prater Kick) (13:24)
- Broncos 14–6 – Tim Tebow 8 Yard Run (Matt Prater Kick) (10:36)
- Broncos 17–6 – Matt Prater 20 Yard Field Goal (7:30)
- Broncos 20–6 – Matt Prater 28 Yard Field Goal (1:05)

Third quarter

- Broncos 20–13 – Mike Wallace 1 Yard Run (Shaun Suisham Kick) (4:29)

Fourth quarter

- Broncos 23–13 – Matt Prater 35 Yard Field Goal (13:10)
- Broncos 23–16 – Shaun Suisham 37 Yard Field Goal (9:59)
- Tied 23–23 – Jerricho Cotchery 31 Yard Pass from Ben Roethlisberger (Shaun Suisham Kick) (3:48)

Overtime

- Broncos 29–23 – Demaryius Thomas 80 Yard Pass from Tim Tebow (14:49)

Top passers

- PIT – Ben Roethlisberger 22/40, 289 YDS, TD, INT
- DEN – Tim Tebow 10/21, 316 YDS, 2 TD

Top rushers

- PIT – Isaac Redman 17 RUSH, 121 YDS
- DEN – Willis McGahee 19 RUSH, 61 YDS

Top receivers

- PIT – Emmanuel Sanders 6 REC, 81 YDS
- DEN – Demaryius Thomas 4 REC, 204 YDS, TD

Top tacklers

- PIT – Ike Taylor 6 TKL, AST
- DEN – David Bruton 8 TKL

The Steelers finished 12–4 and would be the AFC's number 5 seed, playing the number 4 seed 8–8 Denver Broncos. They led 6–0 after the first quarter, but the Broncos scored 20 unanswered points, and as a result they had a 20–6 lead at halftime. The Steelers then regrouped after the second quarter debacle and only allowed a Matt Prater field goal. They recovered a key fumble in the fourth quarter that set up the tying touchdown. The Steelers had one last possession at the end of regulation, but Ben Roethlisberger was sacked on the hail mary attempt which forced overtime with the game tied at 23. This game then became notable for being the first non-sudden death overtime game in NFL history, with the new playoff overtime rules. However, the new rules only applied if the team that got the ball first did not score a touchdown, because if a touchdown or safety was scored at any time, the game would end. This meant that only field goals could be kicked and not end the game. The Steelers lost the overtime coin toss, and the Broncos elected to receive. Shaun Suisham delivered a kick out of the back of the end zone for a touchback, but on the first play, the Steeler defense allowed Demaryius Thomas to go from the Denver 20 all the way to the end zone for a touchdown, ending the Steelers' season.
