= Melvin Bassi =

American politician

Melvin B. Bassi
- Born: November 14, 1926; Charleroi, Pennsylvania, U.S.
- Died: May 2, 2007 (aged 80); Jefferson Regional Medical Center, Jefferson Hills, Pennsylvania,
- Education: Washington & Jefferson College; University of Pittsburgh School of Law
- Occupations: Lawyer, banker, County Commissioner
- Political party: Democrat
- Spouse: Lillian
- Children: 4

Melvin B. "Mel" Bassi (November 14, 1926 – May 2, 2007) was an American lawyer, public official, and banker in Washington County, Pennsylvania.

== Early life and family ==
Bassi was born on November 14, 1926, to an Italian family in Charleroi, Pennsylvania; his mother Clara was an Italian translator for travel agency and his father Bruno worked in a local mill. He graduated from Charleroi High School in 1944, where he had played football, basketball, and baseball. He later married his high school sweetheart, Lillian, with whom he had four children.

After graduation from high school, he joined the United States Navy and became a signalman during World War II. During a typhoon that grounded the destroyer on which he was a shipman, he and his crewmates became stranded on Japanese-occupied Okinawa. They avoided capture and were later rescued. He later served on the USS Pawnee, where he coincidentally served with a cousin from Charleroi.

== Education ==
After returning from the service, he became the first member of his family to attend college, studying economics at Washington & Jefferson College. There, he was a member of the Phi Kappa Psi fraternity and played baseball for four years. He played football alongside "Deacon" Dan Towler and Chuck Heberling, for a year before an injury forced him from the game. Following graduation in 1949, he was offered a job with a Fortune 500 company on the condition that he anglicize his name to drop the "i." Bassi refused and enrolled in the University of Pittsburgh School of Law.

== Career ==
=== Legal career ===
After being admitted to the bar, he opened his own firm on the main street of Charleroi, building the firm to 14 attorneys. His firm, Bassi & Associates, later included his sons Brad and Keith. The firm has developed into the present-day Bassi, McCune & Vreeland, P.C. in Charleroi and Washington.

He also served as solicitor of Washington County from 1981 through 1995. He spent 45 years as solicitor for the Charleroi School District. He was also chair of the Washington County Redevelopment Authority from 1956 to 1970.

All told, he practiced law for more than 50 years and was known as a "lawyer's lawyer."

=== Political service ===
In 1994, he was named Washington County Commissioner to fill the term of Frank Mascara, who was elected to United States House of Representatives, agreeing not to run for re-election. He served until 1995. A Democrat, he was succeeded by Republican Diana Irey, who he mentored after she won the election to succeed him.

=== Charleroi Federal Savings Bank ===
In 1958, he became a director of the Charleroi Federal Savings Bank, attaining the position of president of the bank in 1963. In 2000, he stepped aside to be chairman of the board of directors. During his tenure, the bank went from a single branch to a regional bank with 8 offices and $400 million in assets.

== Personal life ==
He died of a heart attack on May 2, 2007, at Jefferson Regional Medical Center in Jefferson Hills, Pennsylvania. He was buried on May 7, 2007 at Monongahela Cemetery. He was a youth baseball coach for 18 years and a regional football referee for decades. He worked as a football referee for high school and college games, turning down an offer to be a referee for professional football.

In 1973, he was named to the Washington & Jefferson College Board of Trustees.

He had a fascination with the American Civil War, visiting historical sites in Tennessee just days before his death.

== Legacy and recognition ==
When Mel Bassi died earlier this month, the entire valley mourned. Among the more than 3,000 people who waited in line to offer their condolences to his family were day laborers, country club leaders, doctors, housewives, grocery store check-out clerks, childhood friends, construction workers, and bank presidents. What had Mel done during his life that drew so many people to praise him in death? His life is a parable for us all.

— Tori Haring-Smith at the W&J Commencement 2007

During the 1980s, he was a key figure in raising $1.5 million for the Mon Valley YMCA.

In 1998, he received Washington & Jefferson College's Entrepreneur of the Year award. In 2005, he was named to the Washington & Jefferson College Athletic Hall of Fame and received the Robert M. Murphy Award. In 2006, he received the Washington County Chamber of Commerce Exceptional Community Commitment Award.

Upon his passing, the Mon Valley Regional Chamber of Commerce began the Melvin B. Bassi Memorial Golf Tournament in his honor, with the proceeds going to Leadership Washington County. During the 2007 Commencement for Washington & Jefferson College, President Tori Haring-Smith dedicated a large portion of her speech to the graduating class to Bassi's legacy.
