= Myron Pottios =

American football player (born 1939)

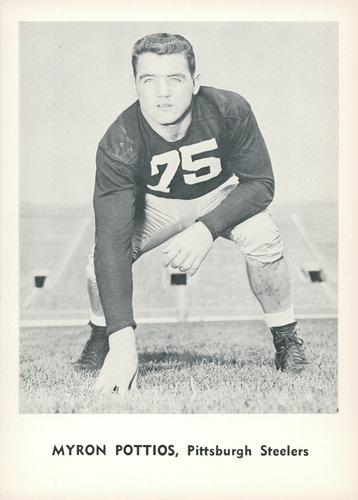

No. 66
- Position: Linebacker

Personal information
- Born: January 18, 1939 (age 87); Van Voorhis, Pennsylvania, U.S.
- Listed height: 6 ft 2 in (1.88 m)
- Listed weight: 232 lb (105 kg)

Career information
- High school: Charleroi (Charleroi, Pennsylvania)
- College: Notre Dame
- NFL draft: 1961: 2nd round, 19th overall pick
- AFL draft: 1961: 3rd round, 21st overall pick

Career history
- Pittsburgh Steelers (1961–1965); Los Angeles Rams (1966–1970); Washington Redskins (1971–1973)

Awards and highlights
- 3× Pro Bowl (1961-1964); Pittsburgh Steelers Legends team

Career NFL statistics
- Fumble recoveries: 11
- Interceptions: 12
- Sacks: 10
- Stats at Pro Football Reference

Myron Joseph Pottios (born January 18, 1939) is an American former professional football player who was a linebacker in the National Football League (NFL) for the Washington Redskins, Los Angeles Rams, and Pittsburgh Steelers. He was elected to play in three Pro Bowls.

== Early life ==
Pottios was born on January 18, 1939, in Van Voorhis, Pennsylvania. He attended Charleroi High School in Washington County, Pennsylvania, where he starred in football, and played basketball. Pottios played fullback, center, and linebacker for the Cougars' football team, and was on the 1956 team that had a perfect regular season record and advanced to the WPIAL Class AA final.

In 1956 he was unanimously selected All-Conference in football, and he received the Beck Memorial Trophy for sportsmanship. This award for good character stood him in good stead later when he punched an opposing player after a basketball game, who had been needling Pottios throughout the game. It was decided he needed no official discipline in light of his good history and contrite admission he was in the wrong. In 2016, the Charleroi Area School District officially named its stadium after Pottios.

== College career ==
Pottios played college football at the University of Notre Dame, where he played offensive line at guard and starred at linebacker. Pottios played only three games in his junior year (1959) after suffering a serious knee injury. After the season, he was selected by his teammates as Notre Dame's team captain for 1960. He was selected a first-team All-American at guard among players from Catholic colleges, chosen by a panel of mentors from 22 colleges for The Tablet.

== Professional career ==
Some experts saw Pottios as a potential top NFL pick at offensive guard. He was drafted in the second round of the 1961 NFL draft by the Pittsburgh Steelers (19th overall), also in the third round of the 1961 AFL draft by the Oakland Raiders (20th overall). He chose to play in Pittsburgh.

=== Pittsburgh Steelers ===
Pottios became the starting middle linebacker of the Pittsburgh Steelers from his rookie year, 1961, up to 1965. In his rookie year, he played in all 14 games, intercepting 2 passes and recovering 1 fumble for a defense that was 7th among 14 NFL teams in points allowed. He did not play in 1962 because of a broken arm. In 1963, he played in all 14 games, intercepting 4 passes for a defense that finished 8th among 14 NFL teams in points allowed, playing alongside rookie outside linebacker Andy Russell.

In September 1964, he suffered a broken arm in the exhibition Hall of Fame Game in Canton, Ohio. He played in only 7 of 14 games, intercepting 1 pass and recovering 1 fumble for a defense that finished 9th among 14 NFL teams in points allowed. In 1965, he again was injured in a preseason game. He played in only 6 games, intercepting no passes and with no fumble recovery for a defense that finished 12th among 14 NFL teams in points allowed and a team that ended the season at 2–12.

In 1963, Pottios was selected first-team All-Pro by the Newspaper Enterprise Association (NEA), second-team All-Pro by the Associated Press (AP), and first-team All-Conference by The Sporting News. He was in three Pro Bowls (1961, 1963-1964). In January 1964, for the first time NFL players themselves voted on an All-Star Team. Pottios was one of the players chosen at linebacker.

=== Los Angeles Rams ===
In July 1966, the Steelers traded Pottios to the Rams for a high draft pick. In contrast to the Steelers, when Pottios joined the Rams from 1966 to 1970, with George Allen as head coach, they were above the .500 mark throughout the period. The Rams made the playoffs twice, in 1967 and 1969, with won-lost records of 11–1–2 and 11–3, respectively.

In 1966, Pottios played in 12 games, but was the backup to future Hall of Fame middle linebacker, 37-year-old Bill George who played in all 14 games. Pottios was the starting middle linebacker from 1967 to 1970, playing between outside linebackers Jack Pardee at left linebacker, and Maxie Baughan at right linebacker throughout. In 1967, Pottios played 11 of 14 games, intercepting one pass and recovering one fumble for the best defense in the league among 16 NFL teams in points allowed. That team lost to the Green Bay Packers in the divisional round, in which Pottios started at middle linebacker.

In 1968, he played all 14 games, recovering 4 fumbles for a defense that finished 3rd among 16 NFL teams in points allowed. But, in 1969, he played in only 5 of 14 games after suffering a severely sprained toe. Not long after, he nearly died from head injuries in an automobile accident that resulted in Pottios receiving 200 stitches in his face and neck, and suffering a punctured right eye. He was replaced at middle linebacker by backup Doug Woodlief for the season; in what would be Woodlief's final season in the NFL because of a knee injury he could not overcome even after off-season surgery. That team lost to the Minnesota Vikings in the divisional round with Woodlief still as the starter.

The Rams drafted middle linebacker Jack "Hacksaw" Reynolds as the team's first pick in the 1970 NFL draft. In 1970, Pottios regained his starting middle linebacker position, and started all 14 games. On the season, he had two interceptions and two fumbles recovered, playing for a defense that finished tied for 2nd among 26 NFL teams in points allowed. However, though Reynolds did not become the starting middle linebacker until 1973, this was Pottios's final year with the Rams.

=== Washington Redskins ===
In 1971, Allen became head coach of the Washington Redskins. He engineered a multi-player trade that included Washington receiving the entire linebacker group of Pottios, Pardee and Baughan (who retired), along with Diron Talbert, John Wilbur Jeff Jordan and a 1971 fifth-round pick (124th overall–traded to Green Bay Packers for Boyd Dowler) from the Rams for Marlin McKeever, first and third round picks in 1971 (10th and 63rd overall–Isiah Robertson and Dave Elmendorf respectively) and third, fourth, fifth, sixth and seventh rounders in 1972 (73rd, 99th, 125th, 151st and 177th overall–to New England Patriots, traded to Philadelphia Eagles for Joe Carollo, Bob Christiansen, Texas Southern defensive tackle Eddie Herbert and to New York Giants respectively) on January 28, 1971.

Pottios played from 1971 to 1973 in Washington, his team reaching the playoffs all three years. He once again played next to left linebacker Pardee (1971-72), and then future Hall of Fame linebacker Dave Robinson (1973) on the left side. He also played next to future Hall of Fame right linebacker Chris Hanburger (1971 to 73).

In 1971, Pottios started all 14 games and had one interception for a defense that finished 4th of 26 teams in the NFL in points allowed. That team lost a divisional round game to the San Francisco 49ers, 24–20, in which Pottios started. In 1972, he played in 12 games, starting seven, but had been replaced by Harold McLinton to begin the season. Pottios became a starter again after McClinton was injured. He recovered one fumble for a defense that finished 3rd of 26 teams in the NFL in points allowed.

In 1972, Pottios was the starting middle linebacker in all three playoff games the Redskins played that year, when they won a divisional round game against the Green Bay Packers and the NFC championship game against the Dallas Cowboys, in which the Roger Staubach-led Cowboys were limited to 169 yards of total offense and three points. However, Washington lost Super Bowl VII to the Miami Dolphins 14–7. Washington's defense gave up only 69 net passing yards, but 184 rushing yards in 37 attempts, including a 49-yard run by Larry Csonka, who had 112 rushing yards in 15 attempts. Pottios had five solo tackles in the game.

In 1973, his final year in the NFL, Pottios started in six games during the regular season, and started a divisional round match against the Minnesota Vikings, losing his final game.

For his 12-year career, Pottios had 12 interceptions, 11 fumble recoveries and 10 quarterback sacks.

== Coaching ==
Pottios coached under Willie Wood for the Philadelphia Bell of the World Football League, that lasted less than two years.
