= Elijah Obade =

American-Lebanese basketball player

Personal information
- Born: October 7, 1991 (age 35) Charleroi, Pennsylvania
- Listed height: 6 ft 9 in (2.06 m)
- Listed weight: 245 lb (111 kg)

Career information
- High school: Charleroi (Charleroi, Pennsylvania)
- College: Delaware Tech (2009–2010); Millersville (2010–2013)
- NBA draft: 2013: undrafted
- Playing career: 2013–2015
- Position: Power forward / center

Career history
- 2013–2014: Levicki Patrioti
- 2014: Wellington Saints
- 2014: Araberri
- 2014: Rasta Vechta
- 2015: Bashkimi

Career highlights
- PSAC East Division Defensive Player of the Year (2013); First-team All-PSAC East Division (2013)

Elijah Obade (born October 7, 1991) is an American-Lebanese former professional basketball player.

== High school and college career ==
Obade attended Charleroi High School in Charleroi, Pennsylvania. As a senior in 2008–09, he averaged 20 points, 12 rebounds and three blocks per game.

As a freshman at Delaware Technical Community College in 2009–10, Obade averaged eight points, eight rebounds and two blocks per game.

Obade transferred to Millersville University in 2010 and was eligible to play immediately. As a sophomore in 2010–11, Obade finished second on the team for blocks with 14, and led the team in rebounding five times. In 22 games (13 starts), he averaged 5.7 points and 5.0 rebounds per game.

As a junior in 2011–12, Obade showed vast improvement, narrowly missing out on averaging a double-double for the season. In 26 games (25 starts), he averaged 11.5 points, 9.8 rebounds and 2.2 blocks per game. His 9.8 rebounds were the best by a Marauder since Tommy Gaines in 1988–89.

As a senior in 2012–13, Obade was named the PSAC Eastern Division Defensive Player of the Year, becoming just the first Marauder to achieve this. He was also the first Marauder named to the first-team All-PSAC East since 2007–08. In 30 games (all starts), he averaged 11.7 points, 11.1 rebounds and 2.5 blocks in 30.7 minutes per game.

== Professional career ==
=== 2013–14 season ===
In August 2013, Obade signed with Slovak team BK Levicki Patrioti for the 2013–14 season. He played his final game for Levicki on February 19, 2014, as he parted ways with the team days later after averaging 12.7 points and 9.7 rebounds in 30 games.

On February 25, 2014, Obade signed with the Wellington Saints for the 2014 New Zealand NBL season. On May 13, 2014, he was released by the Saints. In 10 games, he averaged 7.8 points and 7.5 rebounds per game.

=== 2014–15 season ===
On September 2, 2014, Obade signed with Araberri BC of Spain for the 2014–15 season. On November 5, 2014, he left Araberri after appearing in five games and signed with Rasta Vechta of Germany for the rest of the season. However, he left the club the following month after appearing in just four games.

On January 19, 2015, Obade signed with Bashkimi Prizren of Kosovo, but again had a very short stint as he was released on March 11 after appearing in just five games.

== National team career ==
On June 5, 2015, it was reported that the Lebanese Basketball Federation was courting Obade for the possibility of representing the Lebanon national basketball team at the 2015 FIBA Asia Championship.
