= Ron Hughes (American football) =

American football player and executive (1943–2019)

Profile
- Positions: Center, Linebacker

Personal information
- Born: May 6, 1943; Saint Petersburg, Florida, U.S.
- Died: February 12, 2019 (aged 75); Detroit, Michigan, U.S.

Career information
- High school: Charleroi (Charleroi, Pennsylvania)
- College: California State College '65

Career history
- 1982–1984: Detroit Lions (college scout)
- 1984–1990: Detroit Lions (Director of Pro Personnel)
- 1990–1996: Detroit Lions (Director of Player Personnel)
- 1996–2001: Detroit Lions (Vice President of Player Personnel)
- 2001–2003: Pittsburgh Steelers (draft consultant)
- 2003–2015: Pittsburgh Steelers (College Scouting Coordinator)

Awards and highlights
- 2-time Super Bowl winner (as GM) — XL (2005), XLIII (2008); Mid Monongahela Valley All Sports Hall of Fame (2007 inductee)

Ron Hughes (May 6, 1943 – February 12, 2019) was the college scouting coordinator for the Pittsburgh Steelers of the National Football League (NFL).

== Biography ==
Hughes is a native of Charleroi, Pennsylvania. He was a standout football and basketball player at Charleroi High School. He matriculated to nearby California State College where he played center and linebacker on the football team. He received his degree in education in 1965.

=== Football career ===
After college, Hughes spent the next fourteen years teaching biology and coaching football at the high school level in the Pittsburgh area. This included two years as an assistant coach at Bishop Canevin High School, four years as an assistant at North Catholic High School and finally six years as head football coach at North Catholic.

Hughes joined BLESTO, a scouting organization used by the NFL's Detroit Lions and Pittsburgh Steelers, among others, in 1979 where he spent the next four years as a local and regional college scout.

He joined the Detroit Lions in their college scouting department in 1982. Two years later he moved into the role of Director of Pro Personnel in Detroit. He served in that role for six years before moving up the ladder to the Director of Player Personnel, where he was responsible for the team's entire college and pro scouting departments. In 1996, Hughes was named the Lions' Vice President of Player Personnel, in essence the team's general manager (GM). He served in that role until being swept aside at the start of the team's Matt Millen era.

In 2001, he was hired by his former protégé Kevin Colbert as a draft consultant for his hometown Steelers. In 2003 Hughes accepted the position of college scouting coordinator for the Steelers. He retired in 2015.

=== Personal life ===
Hughes and his wife, the former Adrianne Corno, are the parents of three children – Ted, Scott and Mrs. Jennifer Antoniotti – and also have four grandchildren. He and Adrianne reside in Bloomfield Hills, Michigan, near Detroit.

=== Notes ===
- Steelers Director of Football Operations Kevin Colbert (under whom Hughes works) played football for Hughes at North Catholic High School and later worked under Hughes with the Lions.
- Other high-level NFL front office employees whom Hughes brought into the league include Minnesota Vikings Vice President of Player Personnel Rick Spielman, Lions Director of Pro Personnel Scott McEwen and Lions Director of College Scouting Sheldon White.
