= Charleroi (disambiguation) =

Charleroi can refer to:

- Charleroi, a city in Belgium
- Brussels South Charleroi Airport, an airport in Belgium
- R. Charleroi S.C., a football club in Belgium
- Charleroi, Pennsylvania, a borough in the United States
