= Chuck Heberling =

American football official (1925–2019)

Charles Heberling
- Born: April 28, 1925; Pittsburgh, Pennsylvania, U.S.
- Died: December 9, 2019 (aged 94); McCandless, Pennsylvania, U.S.
- Education: Washington & Jefferson College
- Occupations: Football official Scholastic sports administrator
- Spouse: Jane (deceased)
- Children: 4 (1 deceased)
- Awards: WPIAL Hall of Fame (2007); W&J Hall of Fame (2007)

Charles Heberling (April 28, 1925 – December 9, 2019) was an American football official in the National Football League (NFL) and Western Pennsylvania sports administrator. He was the referee for both the Hail Mary Game and The Drive. He was an alternate for the officiating crew for Super Bowl XXI. Heberling wore the number 46 for the major part of his NFL career.

Upon his inauguration into the Washington & Jefferson College Hall of Fame, his alma mater described him as "the man who has had the greatest impact on high school athletics in western Pennsylvania in the 100-year history."

== Early life and education ==
A native of Pittsburgh, Heberling attended Perry High School in the North Side neighborhood. He attended Washington & Jefferson College, graduating in 1949. There, he was a multi-sport athlete, letting three times in football, where he was a played running back alongside Melvin Bassi, Walter Cooper and "Deacon" Dan Towler, and three times in baseball, where he was a top starting pitcher. During World War II, he served as a fighter pilot in the United States Navy; it was there that he earned the nickname "Ace." Later, he worked as a teacher and coach of the football and basketball at East Washington High School. He also worked as a salesman for General Electric in Pittsburgh.

During the 1970s, Heberling was a school board member for the North Allegheny School District.

== Career ==
=== Officiating ===
Heberling worked as a football official in high school and college football for 15 years and basketball for 25 years. He spent 23 years as an official in the National Football League, 15 years of which (1972-86) he spent as a crew chief. He was promoted from line judge to referee in June 1972 following the death of Jack Vest in a motorcycle accident in South Carolina, and kept Vest's crew (umpire Frank Sinkovitz, head linesman Leo Miles, line judge Bruce Alford Sr., back judge John Steffen and field judge Tony Skover) together in 1972 and '73. Red Cashion was hired as Heberling's replacement at line judge. He spent another 14 years as an NFL observer.

He was the referee for two of the most famous events in professional football: The Hail Mary in 1975, and The Drive in 1987. Later, he was an alternate on the officiating crew for Super Bowl XIII and Super Bowl XXI. He was the replay official for Super Bowl XXIII. (Note: Several sources indicate that Heberling was an official for three Super Bowls. It is not clear whether his above-referenced work on Super Bowl XIII, Super Bowl XXI, and Super Bowl XXIII represent the three Super Bowls referenced in these sources.)

=== Leadership of WPIAL ===
In 1976, Heberling took over as executive director of the Western Pennsylvania Interscholastic Athletic League (WPIAL), which held supervisory control over scholastic sports in Western Pennsylvania. Under his leadership WPIAL grew from an organization being run from a basement into a well-respected and fiscally solvent sports organization, with a permanent headquarters, equality among the male and female sports, and a lucrative contract bringing the WPIAL high school football championship to cable television. He was a capable and headstrong executive, leading the Pittsburgh Post-Gazette to say that he "...took a hard stand on many WPIAL issues and ran the league with a certain boldness that infuriated some school officials, coaches and members of the media." In 1986, he successfully secured the use of Three Rivers Stadium, and later Heinz Field, as the site of the WPIAL championships for all classes of WPIAL football. He retired from the WPIAL on June 30, 1998, after 22 years.

== Personal life ==
Heberling and his wife Jane had four children, three sons and a daughter. He died at his home in McCandless, Pennsylvania, on December 9, 2019, at the age of 94. Heberling was preceded in death by his wife of 65 years, Jane, and his son Daniel. He is survived by two sons, a daughter, nine grandchildren and four great-grandchildren.
