= United States Post Office (Charleroi, Pennsylvania) =

- US Post Office-Charleroi
- U.S. National Register of Historic Places
- Washington County History & Landmarks Foundation Landmark
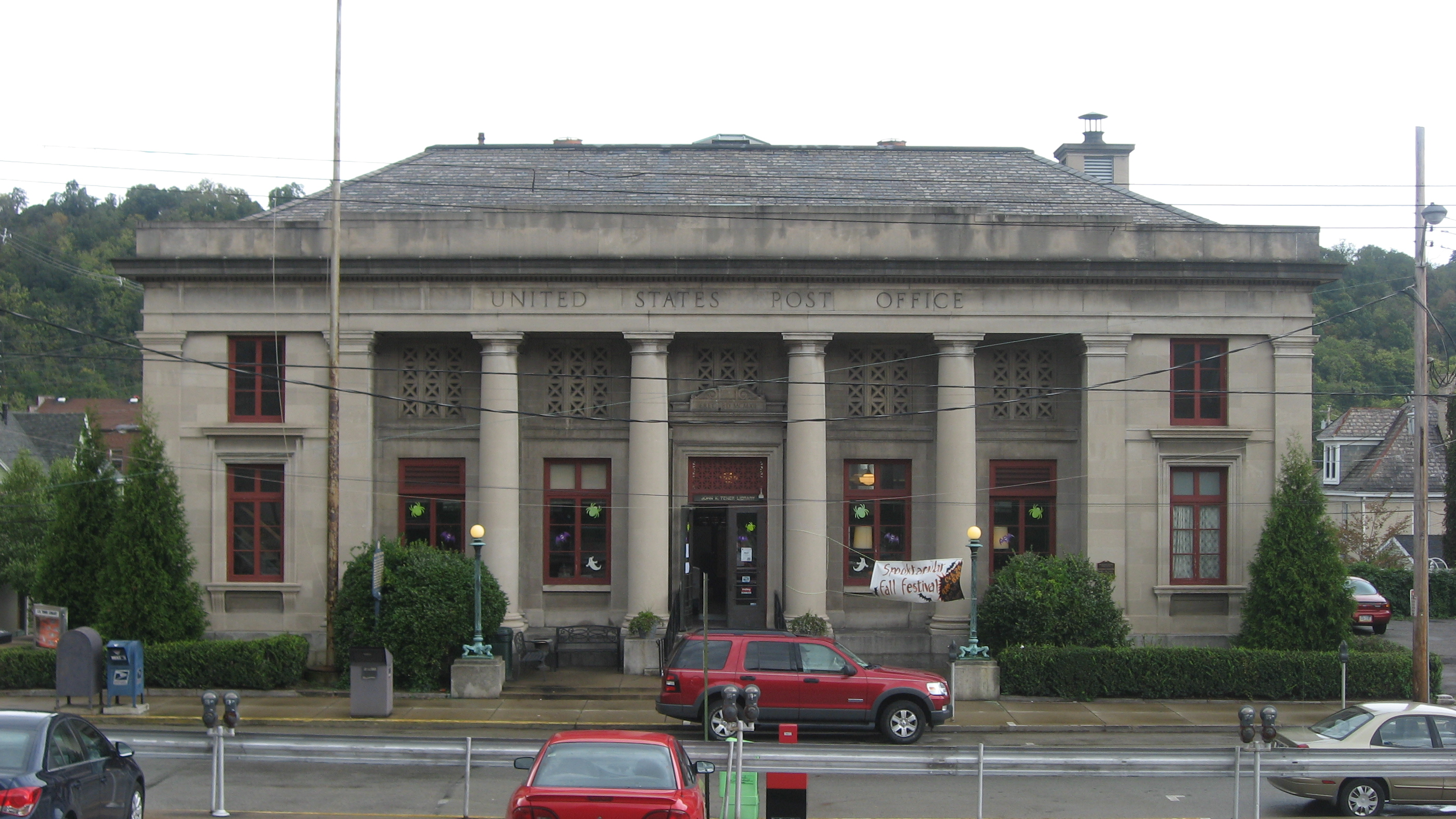
- Front of the post office

- Location within Pennsylvania Location within the United States
- Location: 638 Fallowfield Ave., Charleroi, Pennsylvania
- Coordinates: 40°8′24″N 79°54′2″W
- Area: 0.3 acres (0.12 ha)
- Built: 1909
- Architect: James Knox Taylor
- Architectural style: Colonial Revival
- NRHP reference No.: 89002287
- Added to NRHP: January 4, 1990

United States Post Office—Charleroi is a historic building in Charleroi, Pennsylvania. It is located at 638 Fallowfield Avenue.It is designated as a historic public landmark by the Washington County History & Landmarks Foundation. It now houses the John K. Tener Library .
