= Charleroi Historic District =

Historic house in Pennsylvania, United States

- U.S. National Register of Historic Places
- U.S. Historic district
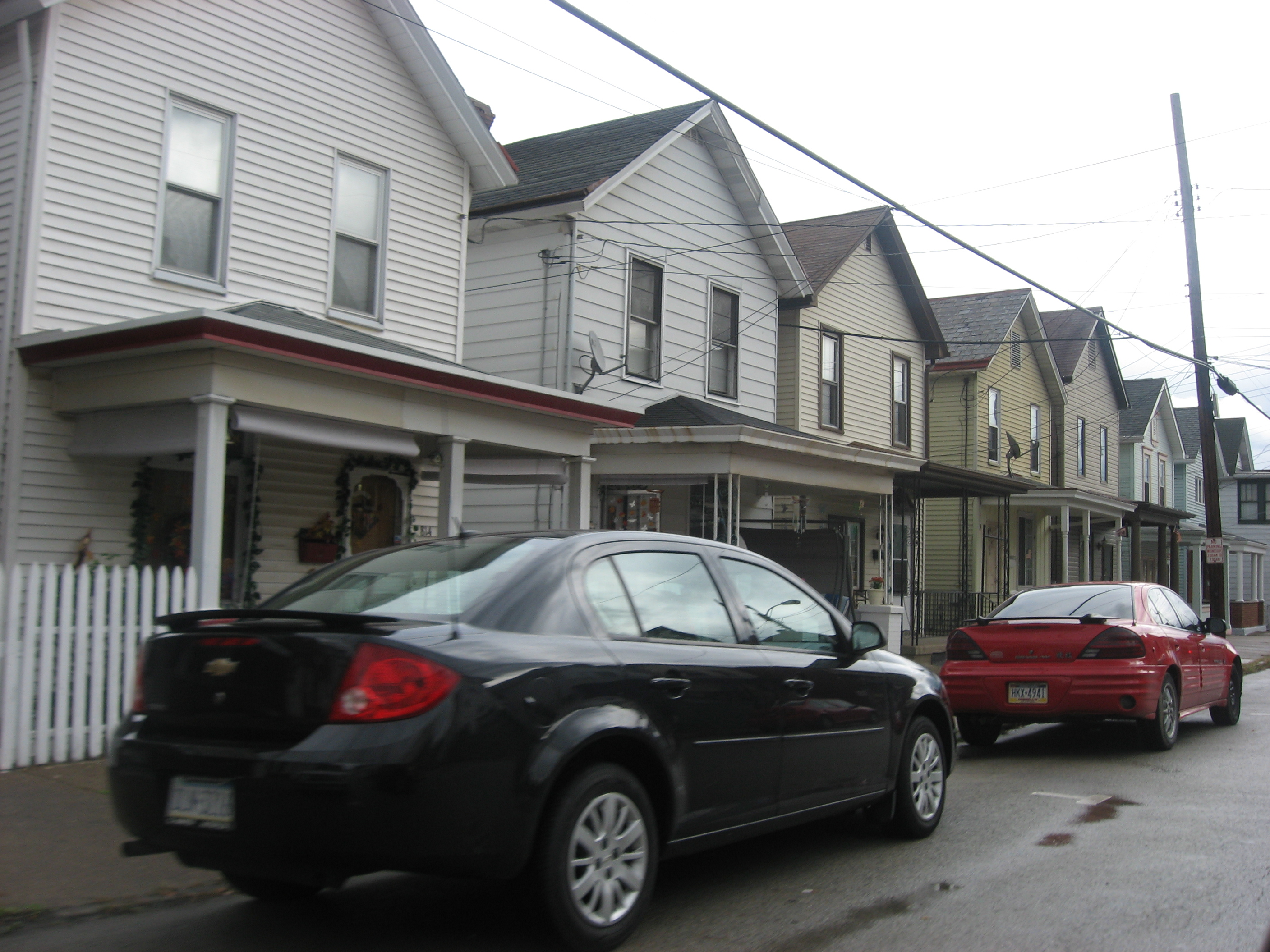
- A typical residential neighborhood in the district

- Location within Pennsylvania Location within the United States
- Location: Roughly bounded by 1st & 13th Sts., Oakland Ave. & Pennsylvania RR tracks., Charleroi, Pennsylvania
- Coordinates: 40°8′29″N 79°54′7″W
- Area: 410 acres (170 ha)
- Architect: Barnhart, Robert L.; et al.
- Architectural style: Queen Anne, Late 19th And 20th Century Revivals
- NRHP reference No.: 07001162
- Added to NRHP: November 9, 2007

Charleroi Historic District is a historic district in Charleroi, Washington County, Pennsylvania.

It consists of almost 1700 buildings, built mainly from 1890 to 1920. Many of the buildings are wooden frame two-story front gabled residences, but others include brick stores, churches, union halls, and clubs. The district is located on a plain along the Monongahela River and the adjoining hills.

The first Masonic Lodge of the American Federation of the Droit Humain was created in Charleroi by Louis Goaziou (French) in 1903. Its name was Alfa Lodge No. 301. This Obedience did allow women to be initiated and become a member with the same rights as men (Co-Masonry).

== Gallery ==
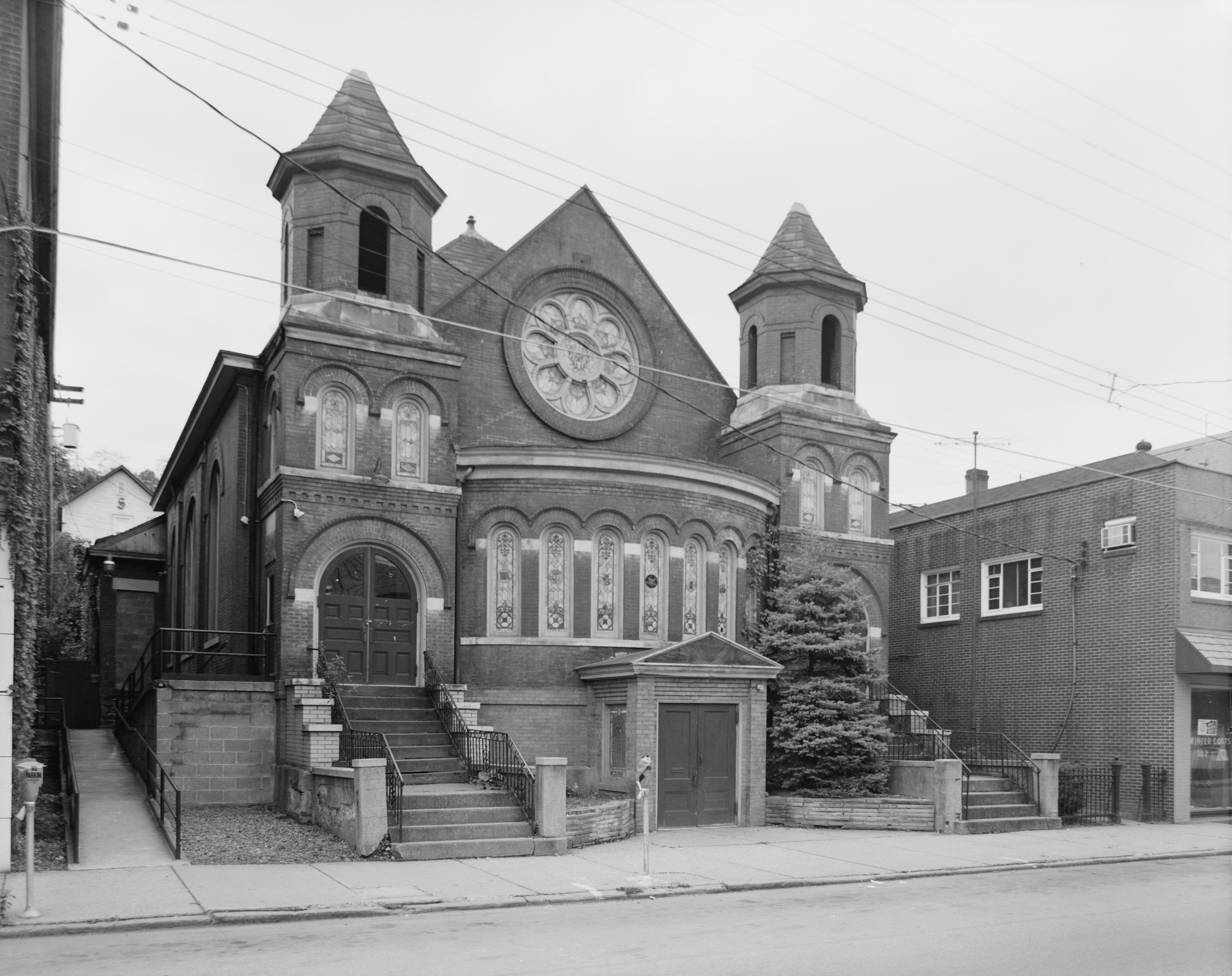
The First Christian Church, built in 1901 and demolished in the 1980s, once part of the Charleroi Historic District.
