= Nick Eason =

American football player and coach (born 1980)

Clemson Tigers
- Title: Associate head coach, defensive tackles coach

Personal information
- Born: May 29, 1980 (age 46); Lyons, Georgia, U.S.
- Listed height: 6 ft 3 in (1.91 m)
- Listed weight: 305 lb (138 kg)

Career information
- High school: Lyons (GA) Toombs Co.
- College: Clemson
- NFL draft: 2003: 4th round, 114th overall pick

Career history

Playing
- Denver Broncos (2003–2004); → Scottish Claymores (2004); Cleveland Browns (2004−2006); Pittsburgh Steelers (2007−2010); Arizona Cardinals (2011−2012)

Coaching
- Cleveland Browns (2013) Assistant defensive line coach; Tennessee Titans (2014–2017); Assistant defensive line coach (2014–2015); Defensive line coach (2016–2017); Cincinnati Bengals (2019–2020) Defensive line coach; Auburn (2021) Defensive line coach; Clemson (2022–present) Associate head coach & defensive tackles coach

Awards and highlights
- Super Bowl champion (XLIII); First-team All-ACC (2002)

Career NFL statistics
- Total tackles: 132
- Sacks: 7.0
- Forced fumbles: 1
- Stats at Pro Football Reference

Nicholas Eason (born May 29, 1980) is an American football coach and former defensive end who is currently the defensive tackles coach and run game coordinator at Clemson University. He previously served as an assistant coach for the Auburn Tigers, Cincinnati Bengals, Tennessee Titans, and Cleveland Browns.

Eason played college football at Clemson and was drafted by the Denver Broncos in the fourth round of the 2003 NFL draft and would play for 11 seasons in the National Football League (NFL) with the Broncos, Cleveland Browns, Pittsburgh Steelers, and Arizona Cardinals. Eason also previously played for the Scottish Claymores. Against the Cardinals, Eason won Super Bowl XLIII with the Steelers.

== Playing career ==
=== College ===
Eason played college football at Clemson. He played in 47 games starting in 35 and finished his career with 153 tackles and 15 sacks. He graduated from Clemson in August 2001 with a degree in sociology and is currently working on his master's degree in Human Resource Development.

=== National Football League ===
Pre-draft measurables
Height	Weight	Arm length	Hand span	40-yard dash	10-yard split	20-yard split	Broad jump	Bench press
6 ft 3 1/4 in (1.91 m)	301 lb (137 kg)	33 in (0.84 m)	9 1/2 in (0.24 m)	5.19 s	1.81 s	2.98 s	8 ft 6 in (2.59 m)	29 reps
All values from NFL Combine

==== Denver Broncos and Scottish Claymores ====
Eason was originally drafted in the fourth round (114th overall) of the 2003 NFL draft by the Denver Broncos. His first season was ended by an Achilles injury. In 2004, he was allocated to NFL Europe and played for the Scottish Claymores. On returning, he spent some time on the practice squad before being waived on September 24, 2004.

==== Cleveland Browns ====
Eason was signed by the Cleveland Browns on 11 November 2004 and played in one game recording two tackles. The 2005 season was his first full season with the Browns and he played in 16 games recording 19 tackles and a career high two sacks. In 2006, Eason recorded 23 tackles from 13 games.

==== Pittsburgh Steelers ====
Eason signed with the Pittsburgh Steelers as an unrestricted free agent on April 16, 2007. In his first season with the team, he played in all 16 games and recorded 14 tackles. In 2008, the Steelers resigned Eason to a 2-year contract.

Eason was released on October 3, 2009 after the Steelers signed Isaac Redman from their practice squad, then re-signed when Redman was waived on October 5. Eason was promoted to the main roster and started in place of the injured defensive end Brett Keisel. In week 17, the final game of the regular season, he had 4 tackles (including a critical tackle for a 3-yard loss on Ricky Williams) against the Dolphins.

==== Arizona Cardinals ====
Eason was signed by the Arizona Cardinals on July 29, 2011.

== NFL career statistics ==
Legend
**Bold**	Career high

=== Regular season ===
Year	Team	Games		Tackles					Interceptions					Fumbles			
Year	Team	GP	GS	Cmb	Solo	Ast	Sck	TFL	Int	Yds	TD	Lng	PD	FF	FR	Yds	TD
2004	CLE	1	0	2	1	1	0.0	0	0	0	0	0	0	0	0	0	0
2005	CLE	**16**	0	19	11	8	**2.0**	**2**	0	0	0	0	0	0	0	0	0
2006	CLE	13	3	**24**	**16**	8	0.0	0	0	0	0	0	**1**	**1**	0	0	0
2007	PIT	**16**	1	17	13	4	0.0	0	0	0	0	0	0	0	0	0	0
2008	PIT	15	0	17	10	7	1.5	**2**	0	0	0	0	**1**	0	0	0	0
2009	PIT	8	5	16	15	1	0.0	**2**	0	0	0	0	0	0	0	0	0
2010	PIT	**16**	5	16	7	**9**	1.5	1	0	0	0	0	**1**	0	0	0	0
2011	ARI	**16**	**6**	12	8	4	1.0	1	0	0	0	0	0	0	0	0	0
2012	ARI	**16**	1	9	6	3	1.0	1	0	0	0	0	0	0	0	0	0
		117	21	132	87	45	7.0	9	0	0	0	0	3	1	0	0	0

=== Playoffs ===
Year	Team	Games		Tackles					Interceptions					Fumbles			
Year	Team	GP	GS	Cmb	Solo	Ast	Sck	TFL	Int	Yds	TD	Lng	PD	FF	FR	Yds	TD
2007	PIT	1	0	0	0	0	0.0	0	0	0	0	0	0	0	0	0	0
2008	PIT	**3**	0	**1**	**1**	0	0.0	0	0	0	0	0	0	0	0	0	0
2010	PIT	**3**	0	0	0	0	0.0	0	0	0	0	0	0	0	0	0	0
		7	0	1	1	0	0.0	0	0	0	0	0	0	0	0	0	0

== Coaching career ==
=== Cleveland Browns ===
In 2013, Eason began his coaching career with the Cleveland Browns as their assistant defensive line coach under head coach Rob Chudzinski.

=== Tennessee Titans ===
In 2014, Eason was hired by the Tennessee Titans as their defensive line coach under head Ken Whisenhunt. In 2016, he was retained under the Titans new head coach Mike Mularkey.

=== Cincinnati Bengals ===
On February 26, 2019 Eason was hired by the Cincinnati Bengals as their defensive line coach under head coach Zac Taylor.

Eason missed the team's weeks 12 and 13 games in 2020 against the New York Giants and Miami Dolphins due to COVID-19 pandemic protocols.

=== Auburn University ===
On January 27, 2021, Eason joined Auburn University as their defensive line coach under head coach Bryan Harsin, replacing Tracy Rocker.

=== Clemson University ===
On January 7, 2022, Eason was hired by his alma mater, Clemson University, as their defensive tackles coach and run game coordinator under head coach Dabo Swinney, replacing Todd Bates.
