= Isaac Redman =

American football player (born 1984)

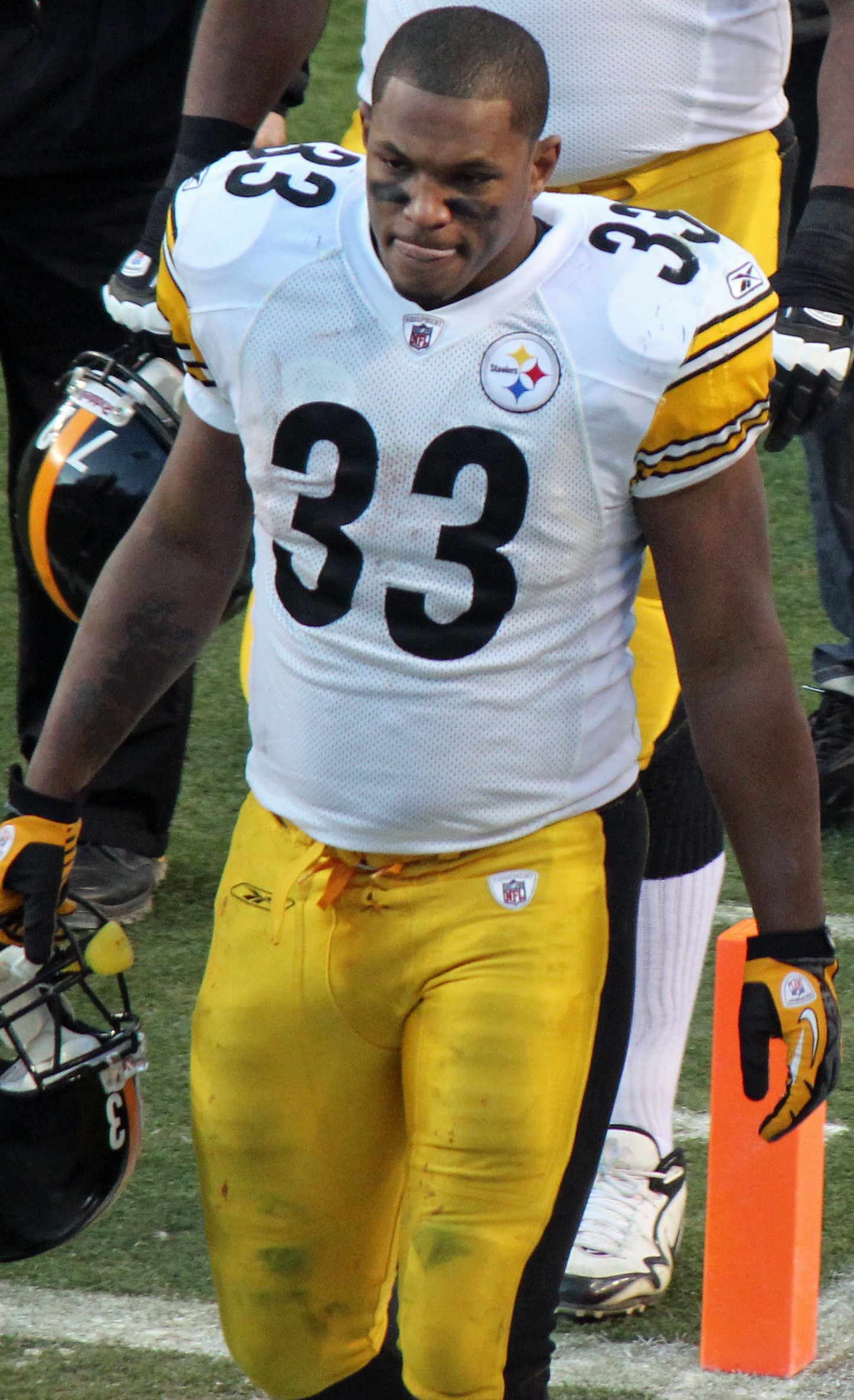
- Redman with the Pittsburgh Steelers in 2011

No. 33
- Position: Running back

Personal information
- Born: November 10, 1984 (age 42); Paulsboro, New Jersey, U.S.
- Listed height: 5 ft 10 in (1.78 m)
- Listed weight: 230 lb (104 kg)

Career information
- High school: Paulsboro
- College: Bowie State
- NFL draft: 2009: undrafted

Career history
- Pittsburgh Steelers (2009–2013)

Career NFL statistics
- Rushing yards: 1,148
- Rushing average: 4.1
- Rushing touchdowns: 5
- Receptions: 50
- Receiving yards: 408
- Receiving touchdowns: 2
- Stats at Pro Football Reference

Isaac Redman (born November 10, 1984) is an American former professional football player who was a running back in the National Football League (NFL). He was signed by the Pittsburgh Steelers as an undrafted free agent in 2009. He played college football for the Bowie State Bulldogs.

== Early life ==
Redman played high school football and wrestled at Paulsboro High School.

== College career ==
Redman played college football at NCAA Division II Bowie State University (BSU) in Bowie, Maryland, which is part of the Central Intercollegiate Athletic Association (CIAA).

Redman finished his career as Bowie State’s all-time rushing leader with 3,300 yards. Some of his other accomplishments at Bowie State include:

- BSU Records in:
  - Single Game Rushing Yards (218)
  - Single Game Rushing Attempts (37)
  - Single Season Rushing Attempts (281)
  - Longest Run from Scrimmage (99 yards)
  - Single Season Rushing yards (1,512).

Some of his other accolades include:

- All-CIAA Rookie Of The Year (2004)
- Team Offensive Player of the Year (2004)
- Offensive MVP of the Gold Bowl Classic (10/22/05)
- Offensive MVP of the CIAA Championship (11/5/05)
- BSU's Offensive MVP in the Pioneer Bowl (12/3/05)
- All-CIAA First-team (2005)
- All-CIAA First-team (2007)

== Professional career ==
Pre-draft measurables
Height	Weight
5 ft 10 1/4 in (1.78 m)	228 lb (103 kg)
Values from Pro Day

=== Pittsburgh Steelers ===
After going undrafted in the 2009 NFL draft, Redman was signed by the Pittsburgh Steelers as an undrafted free agent on April 28, 2009.

Redman was waived during final cuts on September 4, 2009, and re-signed to the practice squad on September 6. He was signed off the practice squad on October 3 when defensive end Nick Eason was released, then waived on October 5 when Eason was re-signed. Redman was re-signed to the practice squad on October 7. On December 2, Redman was released from the practice squad. He was re-signed to the practice squad on December 9. He was signed to the active roster on January 6, 2010.

On September 7, 2010, Steelers head coach Mike Tomlin announced that Redman would be the team's primary goal-line back. On November 21, 2010, Redman scored his first pro touchdown against the Oakland Raiders.

At the end of the 2010 season, Redman and the Steelers appeared in Super Bowl XLV against the Green Bay Packers. He had two rushes for 19 yards and had one kickoff return for 13 yards in the 25–31 loss.

Redman got his first career start in week 5 during the 2011 NFL season against the Tennessee Titans. He rushed for 49 yards on 15 carries. For the season, he recorded 479 yards (4.4 YPC) and three touchdowns with his limited reps.

The Steelers waived Redman once again on October 21, 2013, after being placed on the inactive list for two consecutive games.

== Redman Award ==
In 2012, Steelers-centric SB Nation blog Behind the Steel Curtain created what is known as the "Redman Award." The award, inspired by Isaac Redman's impressive preseason play throughout his career, was to be awarded to a Steelers player, a sixth-round draft pick or lower, who had convinced the fan base throughout the preseason that they were a "diamond in the rough." Other stipulations include that the player must have participated in a maximum of two prior NFL training camps and have had endeared themselves to the fan base regardless of their chances of making the team's final roster.

The first official appearance of the award on Behind the Steel Curtain's website was in 2014, when an article was published detailing the top candidates for the honor.

The award tradition is still carried out by the writers at Behind the Steel Curtain to this day, with the winner being voted on in a poll open to all readers sometime around Labor Day weekend. The winners of the award include Adrian Robinson (2012), Alan Baxter (2013), Daniel McCullers (2014), Roosevelt Nix (2015), Tyler Matakevich (2016), Mike Hilton (2017), Matthew Thomas (2018), Tuzar Skipper (2019), Ulysees Gilbert III (2020), Jamir Jones (2021), Mark Robinson (2022), Spencer Anderson (2023), Cory Trice Jr (2024), Lew Nichols III (2025), and Gabriel Rubio (2026).

The award has gained popularity, being mentioned by other Steelers blogs, and even family members of the award winner.

== Retirement ==
On August 22, 2014, Redman announced that he had suffered a career-ending injury to his spinal cord.

He is a coach for the Deptford Township, New Jersey, youth football team.
