= Weslye Saunders =

American football player (born 1989)

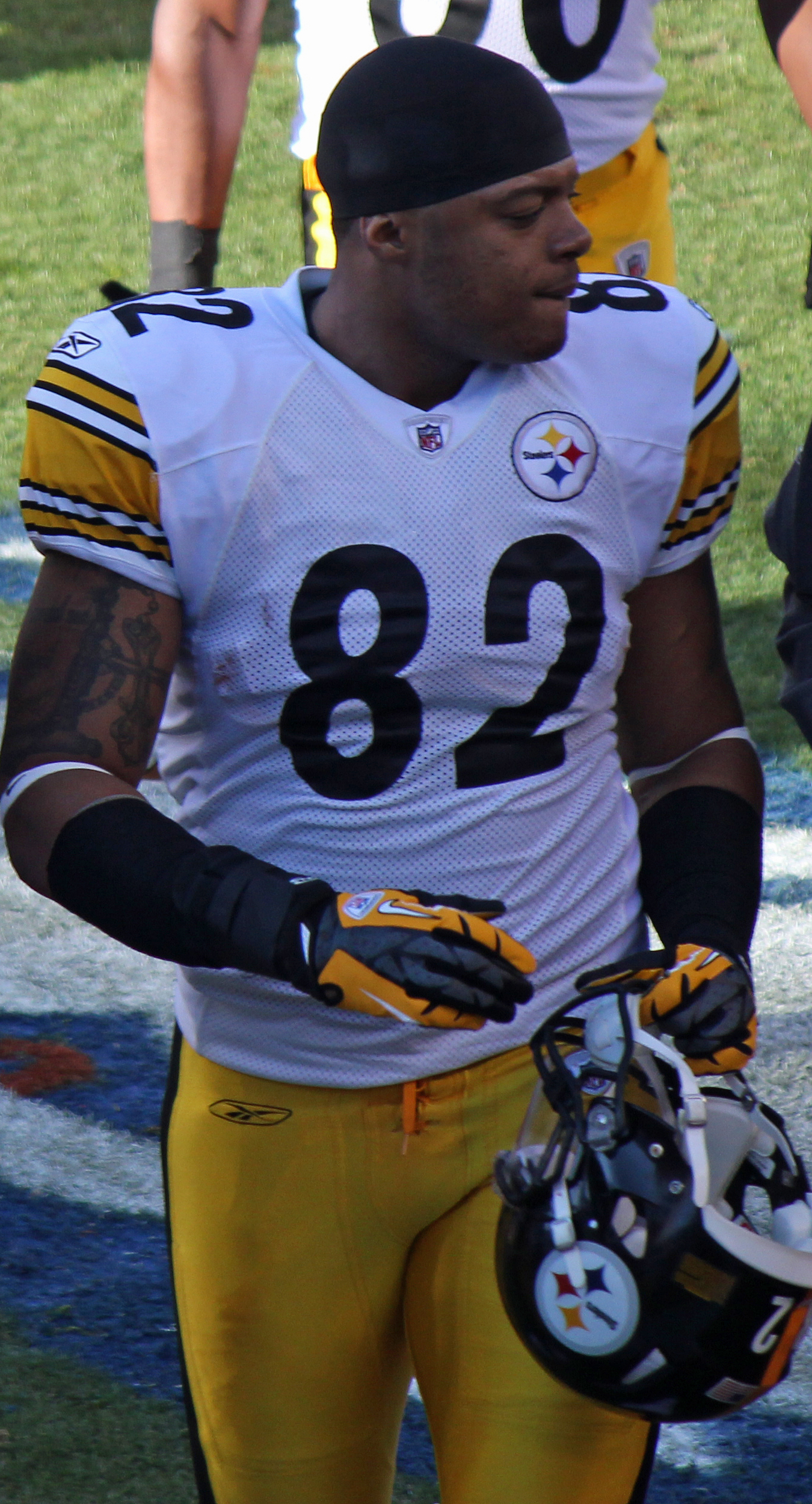
- Saunders with the Pittsburgh Steelers in 2011

No. 82, 85, 47
- Position: Tight end

Personal information
- Born: January 16, 1989 (age 37); Gary, Indiana, U.S.
- Listed height: 6 ft 5 in (1.96 m)
- Listed weight: 254 lb (115 kg)

Career information
- High school: Durham (NC) Riverside
- College: South Carolina
- NFL draft: 2011: undrafted

Career history
- Pittsburgh Steelers (2011–2012); Indianapolis Colts (2012–2014); Birmingham Iron (2019)

Career NFL statistics
- Receptions: 10
- Receiving yards: 90
- Receiving touchdowns: 1
- Stats at Pro Football Reference

Weslye Saunders (born January 16, 1989) is an American former professional football player who was a tight end in the National Football League (NFL). He played college football for the South Carolina Gamecocks and was signed by the Pittsburgh Steelers as an undrafted free agent in 2011. He competed on the Netflix series Outlast: The Jungle, released in June 2026.

== Professional career ==
=== Pittsburgh Steelers ===
After signing as an undrafted free agent for the Steelers on July 25, 2011, Saunders made the 53-man roster as the team's third string tight-end on September 6. He caught his first regular season pass for two yards in a 23–20 win against the Indianapolis Colts on September 25. He scored his first touchdown in a two-yard pass reception in a 13–9 Sunday night win against the Kansas City Chiefs on November 27.

He was suspended for the first 4 games of the 2012 season for taking Adderall. He was released by the Pittsburgh Steelers on October 12, 2012. Saunders was suspended the first 8 games of the 2013 season for taking a not yet published drug.

=== Indianapolis Colts ===
Saunders was signed by the Colts on October 17, 2012. He was then cut on July 25, 2013, following a suspension. Saunders was re-signed by the Colts on October 29, 2013, after he served his 8-game suspension. Wesley was waived by the Colts on August 30, 2014. He re-signed with the team on November 18, 2014, but was waived again on December 2, 2014.

=== Birmingham Iron ===
Saunders was signed by the Birmingham Iron of the Alliance of American Football but was waived before the start of the 2019 regular season. He was re-signed on February 14, 2019, but was waived again on February 25. He was re-signed again on February 28, and waived again on March 19.

=== Career statistics ===
Team	Season	Games	Receiving				
Team	Season	Games	Rec	Yds	Avg	TDs	Long
Pittsburgh Steelers	2011	16	4	29	7.3	1	14
Indianapolis Colts	2012	11	2	15	7.5	0	11
Indianapolis Colts	2013	6	4	46	11.5	0	18
Career totals	(3 seasons)	33	10	90	9.0	1	18
