= Charleroi School District =

School district in Pennsylvania, U.S.

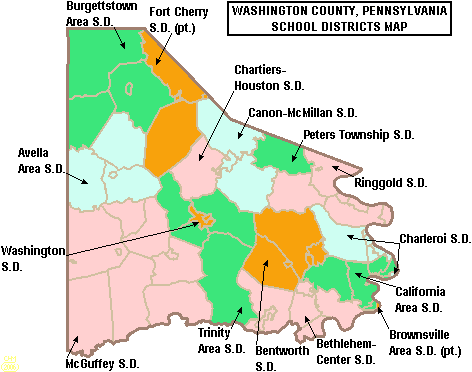

Address
- 100 Fecsen Drive Charleroi, Washington, Pennsylvania, 15022; United States

District information
- Type: Public
- Grades: K–12
- Superintendent: Edward Zelich
- NCES District ID: 4205640

Students and staff
- Enrollment: 1,413 (2020–2021)
- Staff: 97.20 (on an FTE basis)
- Student–teacher ratio: 14.54
- District mascot: Cougars

Other information
- Website: www.charleroisd.org

The Charleroi School District is a public school district covering the Boroughs of Charleroi, Dunlevy, North Charleroi, Speers, Stockdale, Twilight, and Fallowfield Township in Washington County, Pennsylvania. The district includes the census-designated place of Van Voorhis.

== Schools ==
- Charleroi High School (9th–12th)
- Charleroi Area Middle School (6th–8th)
- Charleroi Area Elementary Center (K–5th)
