= Van Voorhis, Pennsylvania =

Unincorporated community in Pennsylvania, US

- Census-designated place
- Location within the state of Pennsylvania Van Voorhis, Pennsylvania (the United States)
- Coordinates: 40°9′22″N 79°58′27″W
- Country: United States
- State: Pennsylvania
- County: Washington
- Elevation: 935 ft (285 m)

Population (2010)
  - Total: 166
- Time zone: UTC-5 (Eastern (EST))
  - Summer (DST): UTC-4 (EDT)
- ZIP codes: 15366
- GNIS feature ID: 1190342

Van Voorhis is a census-designated place and coal town in Fallowfield Township, Washington County, Pennsylvania, United States. As of the 2010 census the population was 166 residents.

== Education ==
The school district is the Charleroi School District.
