= Charleroi High School =

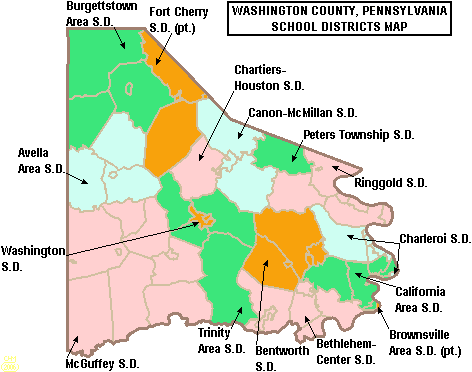

Location
- 100 Fecsen Drive; Charleroi, Washington, Pennsylvania 15022; United States

Information
- Type: Public
- School board: President: Mr. Ken Wiltz
- School district: Charleroi Area School District
- Superintendent: Ed Zelich
- Principal: Patti Mason
- Teaching staff: 31.09 (FTE)
- Grades: 9-12
- Student to teacher ratio: 14.86
- Color: RED\BLACK
- Mascot: Cougars
- Rival: Monessen High School
- Alumni: Christopher Thropp (1982-1986) Fullback #40 on 1986 Penn State National Championship Team
- Website: https://cahs.charleroisd.org/

Charleroi High School is a public high school located in Charleroi, Pennsylvania, USA. The High School is operated by the Charleroi School District. It was built in 1965, and at the time was noted for being one of the few high schools in Pennsylvania to have a Planetarium. It was renovated in 1999-2001
