= Charleroi, Pennsylvania =

Borough in Pennsylvania, US

- Borough
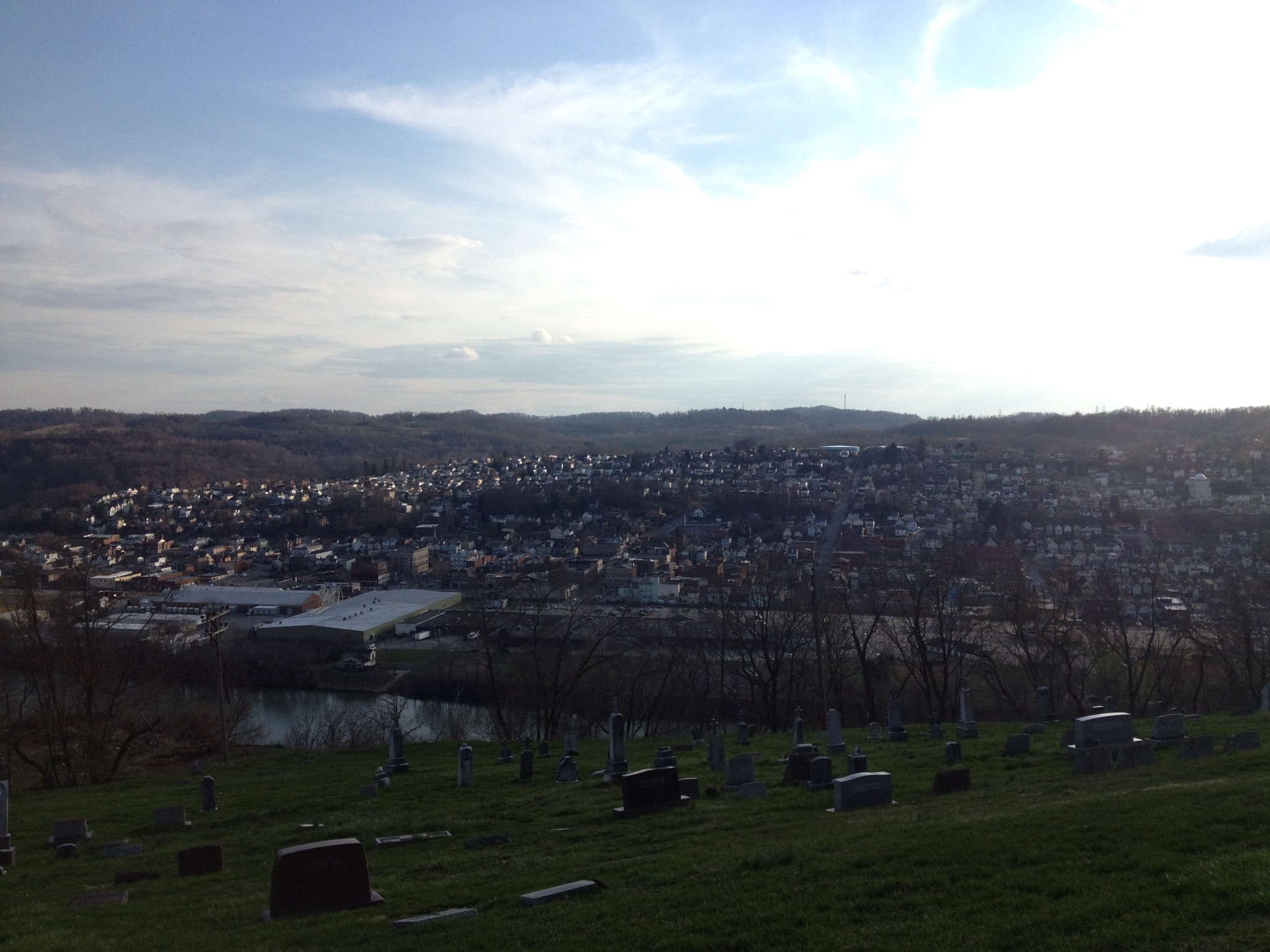
- Overview of Charleroi from across the Monongahela River

- Flag Logo
- Etymology: Charleroi, Belgium; Charles the King
- Nickname: Magic City
- Motto: Business Friendly
- Location of Charleroi in Washington County, Pennsylvania.
- Coordinates: 40°8′17″N 79°54′5″W
- Country: United States
- State: Pennsylvania
- County: Washington
- Established: 1890
- Named for: Charleroi, Belgium

Government
  - Council President: Paul Pervonick (D)

Area
  - Total: 0.86 sq mi (2.23 km^{2})
  - Land: 0.76 sq mi (1.97 km^{2})
  - Water: 0.10 sq mi (0.26 km^{2})

Population (2020)
  - Total: 4,234
  - Density: 5,555.5/sq mi (2,144.98/km^{2})
- Time zone: UTC-5 (EST)
  - Summer (DST): UTC-4 (EDT)
- ZIP code: 15022
- Area codes: 724, 878
- FIPS code: 42-12704
- Website: www.charleroiboro.org

Charleroi (/ˈʃɑːrlərɔɪ/ SHAR-lə-roy) is a borough in Washington County, Pennsylvania, United States, along the Monongahela River, 21 miles south of Pittsburgh. Charleroi was settled in 1890 and incorporated in 1891. The 2020 census recorded a population of 4,210.

Reduced industrial activities in the region led to a decreasing population. The steel-making industry was supported by cheap transportation on the Monongahela River from upstream of Charleroi into northern West Virginia and north as well as downstream past McKeesport to the mouth of the Monongahela in Pittsburgh.

Colloquially, the stretch from Charleroi north to McKeesport (historically because of press coverage of High School sports leagues), is known as the "Mon Valley," and has been extended by some to mean from the river mouth to northern West Virginia. Once dubbed "Magic City," Charleroi has in recent years seen a gradual revitalization of its business district.

== History ==
Charleroi got its name from the Belgian city of Charleroi. Many Belgian immigrants lived in the Monongahela area at the end of the 19th century, some of whom were glass makers.

The Pittsburgh Plate Glass Company, now PPG Industries, had one of its major factories located at the current chamber plaza, at one point employing up to a thousand employees, making it one of the largest glass factories in the world at the time. For years it was the home to one of Corning Glass Companies leading employers. It is home to Corelle Brands, which makes Pyrex. In celebration of the 100th anniversary of Pyrex products, Charleroi renamed itself "Pyrex, PA" for 100 days in 2015.

Charleroi was home to one of the first movie theatres in the nation, the Electric Theatre at 520 McKean Avenue, which opened in October 1905 and has since been demolished. The Charleroi Historic District, First National Bank of Charleroi and United States Post Office are listed on the National Register of Historic Places.

In 2020, Paul Magnette, mayor of Charleroi (Belgium) visited the town that was founded by migrants from his city.

== Geography ==
Charleroi is located at 40°8′17″N 79°54′5″W (40.138088, -79.901333). According to the U.S. Census Bureau, the borough has a total area of 0.9 square miles (2.3 km^{2}), of which 0.8 square miles (2.1 km^{2}) is land and 0.1 square miles (0.26 km^{2}) is water. The total area is 10.47% water.

=== Surrounding and adjacent neighborhoods ===
Charleroi has four land borders, including North Charleroi to the north, Speers to the southwest, Twilight to the south, and Fallowfield Township to the west. Across the Monongahela River to the east, Charleroi runs adjacent with Rostraver Township in Westmoreland County.

== Demographics ==
Historical population
Census	Pop.	Note	%±
1900	5,930		—
1910	9,615		62.1%
1920	11,516		19.8%
1930	11,260		−2.2%
1940	10,784		−4.2%
1950	9,872		−8.5%
1960	8,148		−17.5%
1970	6,723		−17.5%
1980	5,717		−15.0%
1990	5,014		−12.3%
2000	4,871		−2.9%
2010	4,120		−15.4%
2020	4,234		2.8%
2025 (est.)	4,112	▼	−2.9%

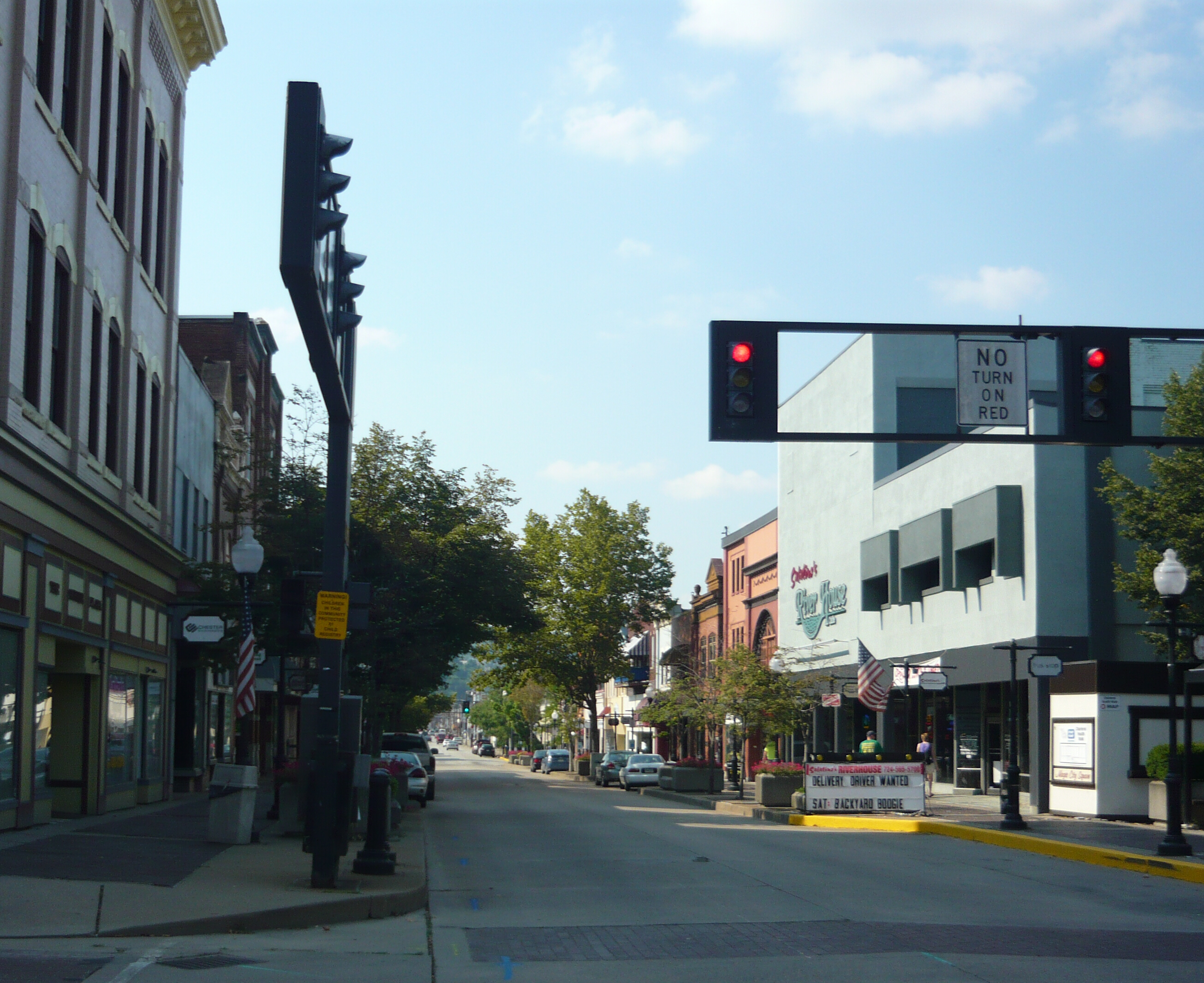
McKean Avenue in Charleroi

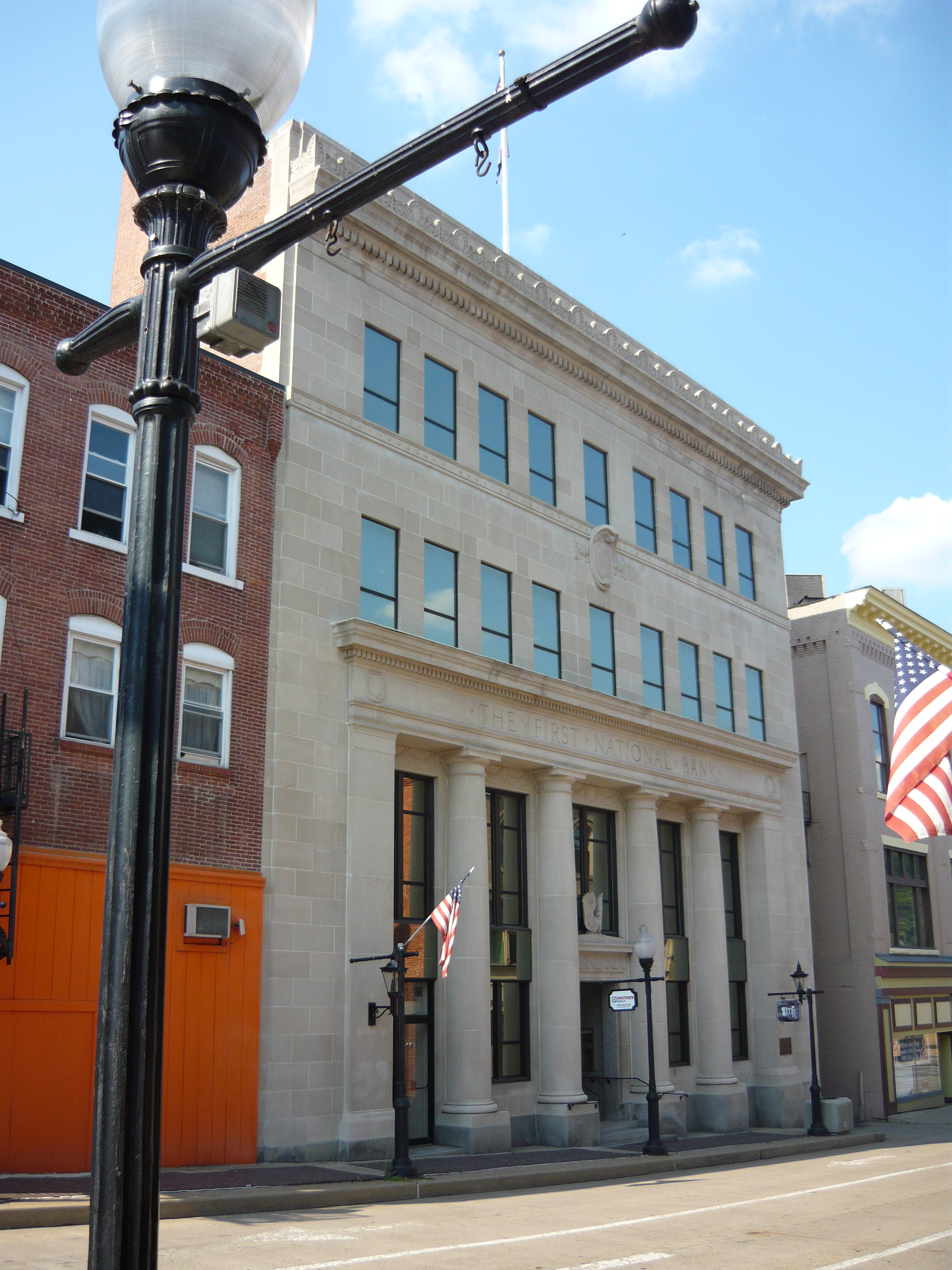
First National Bank (1922)

=== 2020 census ===
As of the 2020 census, there were 4,234 people residing in Charleroi. The median age was 39.6 years. 20.7% of residents were under the age of 18 and 17.4% were 65 years of age or older. For every 100 females there were 95.8 males, and for every 100 females age 18 and over there were 92.3 males.

100.0% of residents lived in urban areas, while 0.0% lived in rural areas.

There were 1,892 households, of which 22.5% had children under the age of 18 living in them. Of all households, 26.4% were married-couple households, 27.1% were households with a male householder and no spouse or partner present, and 36.6% were households with a female householder and no spouse or partner present. About 42.0% of all households were made up of individuals and 17.3% had someone living alone who was 65 years of age or older.

There were 2,460 housing units, of which 23.1% were vacant. The homeowner vacancy rate was 4.9% and the rental vacancy rate was 19.6%.

Racial composition as of the 2020 census
Race	Number	Percent
White	3,306	78.1%
Black or African American	450	10.6%
American Indian and Alaska Native	6	0.1%
Asian	52	1.2%
Native Hawaiian and Other Pacific Islander	1	0.0%
Some other race	64	1.5%
Two or more races	355	8.4%
Hispanic or Latino (of any race)	139	3.3%

=== 2000 census ===
As of the census of 2000, there were 4,871 people, 2,258 households, and 1,208 families residing in the borough. The population density was 6,308.6 inhabitants per square mile (2,435.8/km^{2}). There were 2,656 housing units at an average density of 3,439.9 per square mile (1,328.2/km^{2}). The racial makeup of the borough was 95.3% White, 3.2% African American, 0.1% Native American, 0.3% Asian, 0.2% from other races, and 0.8% from two or more races. Hispanic or Latino of any race were 0.7% of the population.

There were 2,258 households, out of which 22.3% had children under the age of 18 living with them, 35.5% were married couples living together, 13.37% had a female householder with no husband present, and 46.5% were non-families. 41.8% of all households were made up of individuals, and 21.9% had someone living alone who was 65 years of age or older. The average household size was 2.11 and the average family size was 2.88.

In the borough the population was spread out, with 20.5% under the age of 18, 7.1% from 18 to 24, 27.1% from 25 to 44, 20.2% from 45 to 64, and 25.0% who were 65 years of age or older. The median age was 41 years. For every 100 females, there were 81.4 males. For every 100 females age 18 and over, there were 77.1 males.

The median income for a household in the borough was $23,593, and the median income for a family was $31,699. Males had a median income of $30,093 versus $23,873 for females. The per capita income for the borough was $13,752. About 16.1% of families and 21.3% of the population were below the poverty line, including 36.2% of those under age 18 and 13.7% of those age 65 or over.

=== Immigrants ===
By 2024, the borough received immigrants from various countries including Haiti, Jamaica, and Liberia. The Haitians opened businesses, and with their influx meant an increase in the borough's population.

== Education ==
The school district is the Charleroi School District.

== In popular culture ==
- A large part of the plot of the alternate history novel The Two Georges, by Harry Turtledove and Richard Dreyfuss, takes place in Charleroi, Pennsylvania. In the alternate history of this book, North America remains part of the British Empire. Charleroi is described as a large coal-mining town filled with embittered coal miners of mainly Irish descent living under conditions of poverty, exploitation and pollution, who end up supporting radical underground political movements.

== Notable people ==
- Keith Ackerman (1946- ), a bishop and former rector of St. Mary's Church
- Barbara Bosson (1939-2023), actress
- Anne Feeney (1951-2021), a political activist, folk musician and singer-songwriter.
- Shirley Jones (1934- ), singer, actress on Broadway, movies, and television
- Robert Karvelas (1921-1991), American actor born in New York City, but raised in Charleroi
- Lisa Kirk (1925-1990), singer and actress
- Craig McCracken (1971- ), animator, director, producer
- Demi Moore (1962- ), actress; lived in Charleroi for less than a year
- Mitchell Paige (Serbian: Mihajlo Pejić) (1918-2003), WW2 Medal of Honor recipient
- Myron Pottios (1939- ), professional football player, All American at Notre Dame 1959
- Olive Thomas (1894-1920), Ziegfeld girl, actress; wife of Jack Pickford

== See also ==
- Rogers Manor, Pennsylvania
