= 2010 Pittsburgh Steelers season =

NFL team 78th season 8th Super Bowl and 2nd loss

- Owner: Rooney family
- General manager: Kevin Colbert
- Head coach: Mike Tomlin
- Offensive coordinator: Bruce Arians
- Defensive coordinator: Dick LeBeau
- Home stadium: Heinz Field

Results
- Record: 12–4
- Division place: 1st AFC North
- Playoffs: Won Divisional Playoffs (vs. Ravens) 31–24; Won AFC Championship (vs. Jets) 24–19; Lost Super Bowl XLV (vs. Packers) 25–31
- All-Pros: James Harrison (1st team); Troy Polamalu (1st team); Maurkice Pouncey (2nd team)
- Pro Bowlers: OLB James Harrison; DE Brett Keisel; SS Troy Polamalu; C Maurkice Pouncey; Selected but did not participate due to participation in Super Bowl XLV
- Team MVP: Troy Polamalu
- Team ROY: Maurkice Pouncey

The 2010 season was the Pittsburgh Steelers' 78th in the National Football League (NFL), their 11th under general manager Kevin Colbert and their fourth under head coach Mike Tomlin.

They reached Super Bowl XLV for the franchise's eighth Super Bowl appearance, but lost to the Green Bay Packers 31–25. Since then, Pittsburgh has failed to reach the Super Bowl.

The Steelers allowed the fewest points in the NFL in 2010, with 232 (14.5 points per game).

== Off-season ==
In 2009, the Steelers had finished with a 9–7 record in a tie for second place in the AFC North, falling short of the playoffs. The Steelers played all of their home games at Heinz Field in Pittsburgh, Pennsylvania.

The off-season was marked by the trade of Santonio Holmes, and the six-game suspension (then reduced to four games) of quarterback Ben Roethlisberger for off-the-field issues.

The team did not re-sign free agent running back Willie Parker, who had been with the team since 2004. They added receiver Antwaan Randle El and linebacker Larry Foote, who were both with the team for their Super Bowl XL victory.

=== Coaching staff and front-office changes ===
Coaching staff turnover

The disappointing outcome of the 2009 season brought about the first significant changes in the team's coaching staff since the hiring of Mike Tomlin in 2007. Offensive line coach Larry Zierlein and special teams coordinator Bob Ligashesky were dismissed on January 6, 2010. Additionally, quarterbacks coach Ken Anderson announced his retirement on January 5, 2010. All three men had served in the same roles for the three years since Tomlin assembled his initial staff.

Defensive quality control coach Lou Spanos left to become the linebackers coach for the Washington Redskins. Spanos had been on the defensive coaching staff since 1995. Jerry Olsavsky was hired to replace Spanos. Olsavsky had coached linebackers at Youngstown State University for the previous seven seasons following a ten-year NFL career as a linebacker, primarily with the Steelers.

Sean Kugler was hired to replace Zierlein as the offensive line coach. Kugler had until recently served in a similar capacity with the Buffalo Bills.

Al Everest filled the vacancy as special teams coordinator left by Ligashesky's dismissal. Everest has nearly 40 years of professional and college coaching experience, including the last fourteen coaching special teams for three NFL clubs. He served most recently as the special teams coach of the San Francisco 49ers. In 2002 Everest was named the NFL's Special Teams Coach of the Year for his work with the New Orleans Saints.

Randy Fichtner stepped into the quarterbacks coach post vacated by Anderson's retirement. Fichtner had coached the team's wide receivers since Tomlin's arrival in 2007 and Bruce Arians' promotion from that position to offensive coordinator. Scottie Montgomery was hired as the new wide receivers coach. Montgomery had coached receivers at his alma mater, Duke University, for the past four seasons, following an NFL and Arena Football playing career.

Front office changes

The team lost pro scouting coordinator Doug Whaley who left to become the assistant general manager of the Buffalo Bills. Whaley had been in his position with the Steelers since 1999. Brandon Hunt was hired as Whaley's replacement in a return to the Steelers – Hunt had served as a scouting intern with the club in 2005 and 2006. He spent the previous two seasons as a scout with the Houston Texans.

=== Roethlisberger suspension ===
NFL Commissioner Roger Goodell announced in April that Steelers quarterback Ben Roethlisberger will be suspended for up to six games for violating the NFL's personal conduct policy. The commissioner also ordered Roethlisberger to undergo a behavioral analysis. On September 3, Goodell reduced the suspension to four games based on the results of the analysis and Roethlisberger's behavior in the interim period. Roethlisberger had been accused of sexual assault in two separate incidents in 2009 and 2010, though criminal charges were not brought against him in either case.

=== Practice jersey sponsor ===
Communications giant Comcast, the largest cable television provider in the Pittsburgh metropolitan area (as well as Pittsburgh Tri-State), signed on to place ads for its Xfinity bundled service on the Steelers' practice jerseys. (The NFL had previously allowed teams to sell ad space on the practice jerseys in 2009.) Comcast has been an official team sponsor since 2002, when Comcast entered the Pittsburgh market through its acquisition of AT&T Broadband.

=== Roster changes ===
==== Departed players ====
Unrestricted free agents (UFAs) signed by other teams

- RB Willie Parker – signed a 1-year contract with the Washington Redskins
- WR Joey Galloway – signed a 1-year contract with the Washington Redskins
- CB Deshea Townsend – signed a 1-year contract with the Indianapolis Colts
- G Darnell Stapleton – signed with the Florida Tuskers of the UFL
- S Tyrone Carter – signed with the Washington Redskins
- FB Carey Davis – signed with the Washington Redskins
- LB Rocky Boiman – signed with the Detroit Lions

Exclusive rights free agents

- LB Patrick Bailey – re-signed by Steelers; released after final pre-season game in cut-down to 53-man roster; claimed off waivers by Tennessee Titans

Players remaining unsigned

- DE Travis Kirschke

==== New players ====
Unrestricted free agents signed from other teams

- S Will Allen – played for the Tampa Bay Buccaneers in 2009
- WR Arnaz Battle – played for the San Francisco 49ers in 2009
- ILB Larry Foote – played for the Detroit Lions in 2009
- WR Antwaan Randle El – played for the Washington Redskins in 2009
- OL Jonathan Scott – played for the Buffalo Bills in 2009
- LB Renauld Williams – played for the Canadian Football League's Saskatchewan Roughriders in 2009; released after final pre-season game in cut-down to 53-man roster

==== Retained players ====
Unrestricted free agents re-signed

- QB Charlie Batch
- S Ryan Clark
- DE Nick Eason
- DT Casey Hampton
- PK Jeff Reed

Restricted free agents re-signed

Steelers made qualifying offers (tenders) which were accepted by these players, and the players were not signed by another team before the end of the restricted free agency period on April 15. These players are therefore retained by the Steelers.

- RT Willie Colon
- CB William Gay
- P Daniel Sepulveda
- TE Matt Spaeth

==== Trades ====
Players traded away

- WR Santonio Holmes – traded to the New York Jets for 5th round selection (#155 overall) in the 2010 NFL draft

Players added via trade

- QB Byron Leftwich – acquired from the Tampa Bay Buccaneers for 7th round draft selection (#225 overall) in the 2010 NFL draft
- CB Bryant McFadden – acquired from the Arizona Cardinals along with a 6th round selection (#195 overall) for a 5th round selection (#155 overall) in the 2010 NFL draft

==== 2010 draft class ====
The Steelers selected ten players in the 2010 NFL draft which took place over three days in late April. The selections consisted of two offensive linemen, one defensive end, three linebackers, two wide receivers, a cornerback and a running back. All of the team's draftees attended the 2010 NFL Scouting Combine. The first round selection, Pouncey, and the wide receivers Sanders and Brown were the only selections from among the thirty players the team had brought in for pre-draft visits.

The Steelers made one trade during the draft, re-acquiring cornerback Bryant McFadden from the Arizona Cardinals. The deal sent the fifth round selection (pick number 155) which the Steelers had acquired in the Santonio Holmes trade to the Cardinals in exchange for McFadden and a sixth round selection (pick number 195).

After the completion of the draft the team signed nine undrafted free agents.

2010 Pittsburgh Steelers draft selections
Rd	Pick #	Player	Pos	Ht	Wt	College	Status
1	18	Maurkice Pouncey	C / G	6 ft 5 in (1.96 m)	312 lb (142 kg)	Florida	Signed (5-year)
2	52	Jason Worilds	OLB	6 ft 1 in (1.85 m)	254 lb (115 kg)	Virginia Tech	Signed (4-year)
3	82	Emmanuel Sanders	WR	5 ft 11 in (1.80 m)	186 lb (84 kg)	SMU	Signed (3-year)
4	116	Thaddeus Gibson	OLB	6 ft 2 in (1.88 m)	243 lb (110 kg)	Ohio State	Signed (3-year)
5	151	Chris Scott	G	6 ft 4 in (1.93 m)	319 lb (145 kg)	Tennessee	Signed (3-year); placed on reserve/PUP list at start of season
5	155^{[a]}	Traded to the Arizona Cardinals for CB Bryant McFadden and pick No. 195 (below)					
5	164^{[b]}	Crezdon Butler	CB	6 ft 0 in (1.83 m)	191 lb (87 kg)	Clemson	Signed (3-year)
5	166^{[b]}	Stevenson Sylvester	LB	6 ft 2 in (1.88 m)	231 lb (105 kg)	Utah	Signed (3-year)
6	188	Jonathan Dwyer	RB	5 ft 11 in (1.80 m)	229 lb (104 kg)	Georgia Tech	Signed (3-year)
6	195^{[c]}	Antonio Brown	WR	5 ft 10.125 in (1.78 m)	186 lb (84 kg)	Central Michigan	Signed (3-year)
7	225	Traded to the Tampa Bay Buccaneers for QB Byron Leftwich					
7	242^{[b]}	Doug Worthington	DE	6 ft 5.125 in (1.96 m)	292 lb (132 kg)	Ohio State	Signed (3-year); released after final pre-season game in cut-down to 53-man roster; added to practice squad, then dropped from the practice squad one day later

Notes:

^{a} from the NY Jets for Santonio Holmes
^{b} compensatory selection
^{c} from Arizona Cardinals with CB Bryant McFadden for pick No. 155 (24th pick of Round 6)

==== Undrafted free agents ====
2010 Pittsburgh Steelers Undrafted Free Agents
Player	Position	Height	Weight	College	Status	Ref.
Demetrius Taylor	FB	6 ft 0 in (1.83 m)	273 lb (124 kg)	Virginia Tech	Released in first week of training camp	
Dorrian Brooks	G	6 ft 2 in (1.88 m)	306 lb (139 kg)	James Madison	Released after final pre-season game in cut-down to 53-man roster; added to practice squad	
Justin Thornton	S	6 ft 1 in (1.85 m)	213 lb (97 kg)	Kansas	Released after final pre-season game in cut-down to 53-man roster	
Da'Mon Cromartie-Smith	S	6 ft 2 in (1.88 m)	210 lb (95 kg)	UTEP	Released prior to training camp; re-signed after Tuff Harris injury; released again after final pre-season game in cut-down to 53-man roster; added to practice squad	
Kyle Jolly	OT	6 ft 6 in (1.98 m)	300 lb (140 kg)	North Carolina	Released after final pre-season game in cut-down to 53-man roster; added to practice squad	
Cordarrow Thompson	DT	6 ft 2 in (1.88 m)	301 lb (137 kg)	Virginia Tech	Released prior to training camp	
A.J. Trump	C / G	6 ft 3 in (1.91 m)	300 lb (140 kg)	Miami	Released prior to training camp	
Lindsey Witten	DE	6 ft 5 in (1.96 m)	260 lb (120 kg)	UConn	Released prior to training camp	
Bradley Vierling	C	6 ft 3 in (1.91 m)	295 lb (134 kg)	Vanderbilt	Released prior to training camp	

=== Camps and Organized Team Activities (OTAs) ===
The Steelers official off-season training sessions were held on the following dates:

Activity	Dates
OTA	April 19–20
Mini-camp	April 30 – May 2
OTA	May 18–20
OTA	June 1–3
OTA	June 8–10

== Coaching staff ==
Pittsburgh Steelers 2010 staff
Front office: Chairman emeritus – Dan Rooney; President – Art Rooney II; Vice president – Art Rooney, Jr.; Director of football operations – Kevin Colbert; College scouting coordinator – Ron Hughes; Pro personnel coordinator – Brandon Hunt; Head coaches: Head coach – Mike Tomlin; Assistant head coach/defensive line – John Mitchell; Offensive coaches: Offensive coordinator – Bruce Arians; Quarterbacks – Randy Fichtner; Running backs – Kirby Wilson; Wide receivers – Scottie Montgomery; Tight ends – James Daniel; Offensive line – Sean Kugler; Offensive assistant – Harold Goodwin	Defensive coaches: Defensive coordinator – Dick LeBeau; Linebackers – Keith Butler; Defensive backs – Ray Horton; Defensive assistant – Jerry Olsavsky; Special teams coaches: Special teams coordinator – Al Everest; Assistant special teams – Amos Jones; Strength and conditioning: Strength and conditioning – Garrett Giemont; Conditioning assistant – Marcel Pastoor

== Final roster ==
2010 Pittsburgh Steelers roster
Quarterbacks (QB): 16 Charlie Batch; 4 Byron Leftwich; 7 Ben Roethlisberger; Running backs (RB): 27 Jonathan Dwyer; 34 Rashard Mendenhall; 21 Mewelde Moore; 33 Isaac Redman; Wide receivers (WR): 81 Arnaz Battle; 84 Antonio Brown; 82 Antwaan Randle El; 88 Emmanuel Sanders; 17 Mike Wallace; 86 Hines Ward; Tight ends (TE): 85 David Johnson; 83 Heath Miller; 89 Matt Spaeth	Offensive linemen (OL): 71 Flozell Adams T; 79 Trai Essex G; 73 Ramon Foster G; 66 Tony Hills T; 68 Chris Kemoeatu G; 64 Doug Legursky C/G; 53 Maurkice Pouncey C; 61 Chris Scott G; 72 Jonathan Scott T; Defensive linemen (DL): 93 Nick Eason DE; 98 Casey Hampton NT; 76 Chris Hoke NT; 96 Ziggy Hood DE; 99 Brett Keisel DE; 69 Steve McLendon NT; 91 Aaron Smith DE	Linebackers (LB): 51 James Farrior ILB; 50 Larry Foote ILB; 57 Keyaron Fox ILB; 92 James Harrison OLB; 55 Stevenson Sylvester ILB; 94 Lawrence Timmons ILB; 56 LaMarr Woodley OLB; 97 Jason Worilds OLB; Defensive backs (DB): 26 Will Allen SS; 28 Crezdon Butler CB; 25 Ryan Clark FS; 22 William Gay FS; 23 Keenan Lewis CB; 20 Bryant McFadden CB; 37 Anthony Madison CB; 29 Ryan Mundy SS; 43 Troy Polamalu SS; 24 Ike Taylor CB; Special teams (ST): 13 Jeremy Kapinos P; 6 Shaun Suisham K; 60 Greg Warren LS	Practice squad: 87 Eugene Bright TE; 77 Dorian Brooks G; 42 Da'Mon Cromartie-Smith S; 90 Chris Ellis DE; 19 Tyler Grisham WR; 77 Ra'Shon Harris NT; 67 Kyle Jolly T; 44 Frank Summers FB; Reserve: 74 Willie Colon T (IR); 10 Dennis Dixon QB (IR); 31 Tuff Harris SS (IR); 9 Daniel Sepulveda P (IR); 78 Max Starks T (IR); 80 Limas Sweed WR (IR); Rookies in italics 53 active, 6 reserve, 8 practice squad

== Preseason ==
=== Schedule ===
The Steelers preseason schedule was announced on March 31, 2010.

Week	Date	Kickoff(ET)	Opponent	Result	Record	Game site	Game TV	NFL.com recap
1	August 14	7:30 p.m.	Detroit Lions	W 23–7	1–0	Heinz Field	KDKA	Recap
2	August 21	7:00 p.m.	at New York Giants	W 24–17	2–0	New Meadowlands Stadium	KDKA	Recap
3	August 29	8:00 p.m.	at Denver Broncos	L 17–34	2–1	Invesco Field at Mile High	FOX	Recap
4	September 2	7:30 p.m.	Carolina Panthers	W 19–3	3–1	Heinz Field	KDKA	Recap

== Regular season ==
=== Schedule ===
Per the NFL's predetermined scheduling formula, the Steelers played every team in the AFC East and NFC South, the teams from the AFC South and West who finished in the same position as the Steelers in 2009 (third), and their usual AFC North division rivals.

The Steelers played a Sunday night game on October 31 against the defending Super Bowl champion New Orleans Saints in a game which conflicted with game four of baseball's World Series. This marked the first time the NFL has scheduled a Sunday night game opposite a World Series contest that is not a seventh game. The league explained that the decision of which game to show in this time slot was made with an eye toward minimizing the possibility that one of the competitors would be from the same market as a team participating in the World Series – New Orleans has no Major League Baseball team and the Pittsburgh Pirates were considered long shots to participate in the post-season (and indeed, they posted the worst record in Major League Baseball in 2010). There was also a feeling among the schedulers that the Steelers have a following independent of other sports. Additionally, while the Saints are the defending Super Bowl champions, the Steelers had won Super Bowl XLIII the season before. The game was considered for the NFL Kickoff game, but before the Saints eventual opponent (the Minnesota Vikings) was announced, the Steelers publicly declined the offer due to the Pirates being scheduled to play at nearby PNC Park during Weeks 2 and 3 of the Steelers season, and the fact that the two teams prefer not to play in Pittsburgh on the same day due to parking issues along Pittsburgh's North Side, where both PNC Park and Heinz Field are located. The Steelers hosted the Atlanta Falcons in their season opener instead.

The Steelers' only Monday Night Football appearance occurred on November 8 against the Cincinnati Bengals.

Although it is generally unusual to have more than two consecutive home or away games, the Steelers schedule featured three consecutive away games (weeks 7–9) and three consecutive home games (weeks 14–16).

The team brought back their throwback uniform for a fourth year. It was worn October 17 against the Cleveland Browns and November 14 against the New England Patriots. This marked the first season since the uniforms were introduced in 2007 that the Steelers did not wear their throwback uniform against the rival Baltimore Ravens.

Week	Date	Kickoff(ET)	Opponent	Result	Record	Game site	Game TV	NFL.com recap
1	September 12	1:00 p.m.	Atlanta Falcons	**W** 15–9 (OT)	1–0	Heinz Field	FOX	Recap
2	September 19	1:00 p.m.	at Tennessee Titans	**W** 19–11	2–0	LP Field	CBS	Recap
3	September 26	1:00 p.m.	at Tampa Bay Buccaneers	**W** 38–13	3–0	Raymond James Stadium	CBS	Recap
4	October 3	1:00 p.m.	**Baltimore Ravens**	**L** 14–17	3–1	Heinz Field	CBS	Recap
5	Bye							
6	October 17	1:00 p.m.	**Cleveland Browns**	**W** 28–10	4–1	Heinz Field	CBS	Recap
7	October 24	1:00 p.m.	at Miami Dolphins	**W** 23–22	5–1	Sun Life Stadium	CBS	Recap
8	October 31	8:20 p.m.	at New Orleans Saints	**L** 10–20	5–2	Louisiana Superdome	NBC	Recap
9	November 8	8:30 p.m.	at **Cincinnati Bengals**	**W** 27–21	6–2	Paul Brown Stadium	ESPN	Recap
10	November 14	8:20 p.m.	New England Patriots	**L** 26–39	6–3	Heinz Field	NBC	Recap
11	November 21	1:00 p.m.	Oakland Raiders	**W** 35–3	7–3	Heinz Field	CBS	Recap
12	November 28	1:00 p.m.	at Buffalo Bills	**W** 19–16 (OT)	8–3	Ralph Wilson Stadium	CBS	Recap
13	December 5	8:20 p.m.	at **Baltimore Ravens**	**W** 13–10	9–3	M&T Bank Stadium	NBC	Recap
14	December 12	1:00 p.m.	**Cincinnati Bengals**	**W** 23–7	10–3	Heinz Field	CBS	Recap
15	December 19	4:15 p.m.	New York Jets	**L** 17–22	10–4	Heinz Field	CBS	Recap
16	December 23	8:20 p.m.	Carolina Panthers	**W** 27–3	11–4	Heinz Field	NFLN	Recap
17	January 2	1:00 p.m.	at **Cleveland Browns**	**W** 41–9	12–4	Cleveland Browns Stadium	CBS	Recap

Note: Intra-divisional opponents are in bold text.

=== Standings ===
AFC North
	W	L	T	PCT	DIV	CONF	PF	PA	STK
^{(2)} Pittsburgh Steelers	12	4	0	.750	5–1	9–3	375	232	W2
^{(5)} Baltimore Ravens	12	4	0	.750	4–2	9–3	357	270	W4
Cleveland Browns	5	11	0	.313	1–5	3–9	271	332	L4
Cincinnati Bengals	4	12	0	.250	2–4	3–9	322	395	L1

=== Game summaries ===
==== Week 1: vs. Atlanta Falcons ====
Week 1: Atlanta Falcons at Pittsburgh Steelers – Game summary

Quarter	1	2	3	4	OT	Total
Falcons	0	3	3	3	0	**9**
**Steelers**	3	0	3	3	6	**15**

at Heinz Field, Pittsburgh, Pennsylvania

- Date: September 12
- Game time: 1:00 p.m. EDT
- Game weather: 67 °F (19 °C) (Cloudy)
- Game attendance: 63,609
- Referee: Scott Green
- TV announcers (FOX): Dick Stockton, Charles Davis, Jim Mora, & Laura Okmin
- Recap

Game information

**First quarter**

- PIT – Jeff Reed 52-yard field goal. Steelers 3–0. **Drive: 11 plays, 40 yards, 7:09.**

**Second quarter**

- ATL – Matt Bryant 49-yard field goal. Tied 3–3. **Drive: 4 plays, 24 yards, 0:17.**

**Third quarter**

- ATL – Matt Bryant 39-yard field goal. Falcons 6–3. **Drive: 13 plays, 56 yards, 4:20.**
- PIT – Jeff Reed 36-yard field goal. Tied 6–6. **Drive: 6 plays, 62 yards, 3:47.**

**Fourth quarter**

- PIT – Jeff Reed 34-yard field goal. Steelers 9–6. **Drive: 10 plays, 67 yards, 5:07.**
- ATL – Matt Bryant 23-yard field goal. Tied 9–9. **Drive: 13 plays, 64 yards, 5:30.**

**Overtime**

- PIT – Rashard Mendenhall 50-yard run. Steelers 15–9. **Drive: 1 plays, 50 yards, 0:11.**

**Top passers**

- ATL – Matt Ryan – 27/44, 252 yards, INT
- PIT – Dennis Dixon – 18/26, 236 yards, INT

**Top rushers**

- ATL – Michael Turner – 19 rushes, 42 yards
- PIT – Rashard Mendenhall – 22 rushes, 120 yards, TD

**Top receivers**

- ATL – Roddy White – 13 receptions, 111 yards
- PIT – Hines Ward – 6 receptions, 108 yards

The Steelers began their season at home in an interconference duel with the Atlanta Falcons. Pittsburgh delivered the opening punch in the first quarter as kicker Jeff Reed made a 52-yard field goal. The Falcons would answer in the second quarter with kicker Matt Bryant making a 49-yard field goal.

Atlanta would take the lead in the third quarter with Bryant's 39-yard field goal, but Pittsburgh would tie the game on Reed's 36-yard field goal. In the fourth quarter, the Steelers would regain the lead as Reed got a 34-yard field goal. However, the Falcons would respond as Bryant nailed a 23-yard field goal. In overtime, Pittsburgh made quick work of their lone possession as running back Rashard Mendenhall got the game-ending 50-yard touchdown run.

With the win, the Steelers not only began their season at 1–0, but they also picked up their eighth consecutive opening day win.

==== Week 2: at Tennessee Titans ====
Week 2: Pittsburgh Steelers at Tennessee Titans – Game summary

Quarter	1	2	3	4	Total
**Steelers**	7	6	0	6	**19**
Titans	3	0	0	8	**11**

at LP Field, Nashville, Tennessee

- Date: September 19
- Game time: 1:00 pm. EDT
- Game weather: 87 °F (31 °C) (Sunny)
- Game attendance: 69,143
- Referee: John Parry
- TV announcers (CBS): Kevin Harlan and Solomon Wilcots
- Recap

Game information

**First quarter**

- PIT – Antonio Brown 89-yard kickoff return (Jeff Reed kick). Steelers 7–0. **Drive: 0 plays, 0 yards, 0:14.**
- TEN – Rob Bironas 21-yard field goal. Steelers 7–3. **Drive: 6 plays, 34 yards, 2:52.**

**Second quarter**

- PIT – Jeff Reed 36-yard field goal. Steelers 10–3. **Drive: 11 plays, 62 yards, 6:33.**
- PIT – Jeff Reed 34-yard field goal. Steelers 13–3. **Drive: 4 plays, 7 yards, 1:36.**

**Third quarter**

**Fourth quarter**

- PIT – Jeff Reed 25-yard field goal. Steelers 16–3. **Drive: 8 plays, 28 yards, 4:53.**
- PIT – Jeff Reed 27-yard field goal. Steelers 19–3. **Drive: 4 plays, 6 yards, 1:33.**
- TEN – Nate Washington 2-yard pass from Kerry Collins (Kerry Collins – Kenny Britt pass). Steelers 19–11. **Drive: 17 plays, 85 yards, 4:01.**

**Top passers**

- PIT – Charlie Batch – 5/11, 25 yards
- TEN – Kerry Collins – 17/25, 149 yards, TD, INT

**Top rushers**

- PIT – Rashard Mendenhall – 23 rushes, 69 yards
- TEN – Chris Johnson – 16 rushes, 34 yards

**Top receivers**

- PIT – Mike Wallace – 2 receptions, 25 yards
- TEN – Justin Gage – 4 receptions, 74 yards

Hoping to maintain their winning streak, the Steelers flew to LP Field for an AFC Duel with the Titans. The Steelers wasted no time getting the early lead when on the opening kickoff, Mewelde Moore handed the ball off to rookie wide receiver Antonio Brown, who returned it 89 yards for a touchdown. Tennessee would cut the lead when Rob Bironas nailed a 21-yard field goal. Throughout the rest of the game, Pittsburgh scored steadily with kicker Jeff Reed, who hit field goals of 36, 34, 25, and 27 yards, putting the Steelers up 19–3. The Titans finally scored a touchdown in the fourth quarter with a Kerry Collins 2-yard pass to former Steeler Nate Washington, and successfully converted the 2-point conversion and onside kick necessary to give themselves the chance to tie the game on the final drive. However, Pittsburgh's defense was able to stop Chris Johnson on a reception as the clock ran out, sealing the victory.

Starting quarterback Dennis Dixon sprained his left knee during the second quarter and was replaced by Charlie Batch, but the Steelers defense swarmed the Titans, coming up with four sacks and forcing seven turnovers, the most by Tennessee since 2000.

The Titans pulled their starting QB, Vince Young, after his third turnover. After replacing Young, Kerry Collins had two turnovers of his own.

Pittsburgh also ended Tennessee running back Chris Johnson's 100-yard rushing streak at 12 games. The NFL's rushing champion had a chance to move one game away from the league record of 14 held by Barry Sanders, but he finished with just 16 carries for 34 yards.

Steelers linebacker James Harrison had three sacks, forced a fumble and recovered another. Safety Troy Polamalu was credited for an interception and an impressive leaping tackle on Kerry Collins during an attempted goal-line stand by the Steelers to win the game and improve to 2–0.

==== Week 3: at Tampa Bay Buccaneers ====
Week 3: Pittsburgh Steelers at Tampa Bay Buccaneers – Game summary

Quarter	1	2	3	4	Total
**Steelers**	7	21	3	7	**38**
Buccaneers	3	3	0	7	**13**

at Raymond James Stadium, Tampa, Florida

- Date: September 26
- Game time: 1:00 pm. EDT
- Game weather: 90 °F (32 °C) (Cloudy)
- Game attendance: 61,036
- Referee: Bill Leavy
- TV announcers (CBS): Gus Johnson and Steve Tasker
- Recap

Game information

**First quarter**

- TB – Connor Barth 40-yard field goal. Buccaneers 3–0. **Drive: 4 plays, 9 yards, 1:58.**
- PIT – Mike Wallace 46-yard pass from Charlie Batch (Jeff Reed kick). Steelers 7–3. **Drive: 2 plays, 45 yards, 0:53.**

**Second quarter**

- TB – Connor Barth 24-yard field goal. Steelers 7–6. **Drive: 15 plays, 74 yards, 8:45.**
- PIT – Rashard Mendenhall 3-yard run (Jeff Reed kick). Steelers 14–6. **Drive: 6 plays, 67 yards, 3:49.**
- PIT – Mile Wallace 41-yard pass from Charlie Batch (Jeff Reed kick). Steelers 21–6. **Drive: 2 plays, 44 yards, 0:47.**
- PIT – Hines Ward 9-yard pass from Charlie Batch (Jeff Reed kick). Steelers 28–6. **Drive: 11 plays, 79 yards, 4:02.**

**Third quarter**

- PIT – Jeff Reed 24-yard field goal. Steelers 31–6. **Drive: 8 plays, 53 yards, 4:21.**

**Fourth quarter**

- PIT – Brett Keisel 79-yard interception return (Jeff Reed kick). Steelers 38–6.
- TB – LeGarrette Blount 1-yard run (Connor Barth kick). Steelers 38–13. **Drive: 10 plays, 68 yards, 4:09.**

**Top passers**

- PIT – Charlie Batch – 12/17, 186 yards, 3 TD, 2 INT
- TB – Josh Freeman – 20/31, 184 yards, INT

**Top rushers**

- PIT – Rashard Mendenhall – 19 rushes, 143 yards, TD
- TB – LeGarrette Blount – 6 rushes, 27 yards, TD

**Top receivers**

- PIT – Mike Wallace – 3 receptions, 100 yards, 2 TD
- TB – Earnest Graham – 4 receptions, 57 yards

Coming off their road win over the Titans, the Steelers flew to Raymond James Stadium for a Week 3 interconference duel with the Tampa Bay Buccaneers. With quarterback Dennis Dixon recovering from injury, veteran quarterback Charlie Batch made his first start since Week 17 of the 2007 season.

Pittsburgh trailed early in the first quarter as Buccaneers kicker Connor Barth got a 40-yard field goal following a Batch interception. Afterwards, the Steelers would answer as Batch completed a 46-yard touchdown pass to wide receiver Mike Wallace. Tampa Bay would respond in the second quarter as Barth nailed a 24-yard field goal, but Pittsburgh would strike back, beginning with a 3-yard touchdown run from running back Rashard Mendenhall. Batch would then find Wallace again on a 41-yard touchdown pass, followed by his 9-yard touchdown pass to wide receiver Hines Ward.

The Steelers would pull away in the second half as kicker Jeff Reed booted a 24-yard field goal in the third quarter, followed by defensive end Brett Keisel returning an interception 79 yards for a touchdown in the fourth quarter. The Buccaneers would close out the game as running back LeGarrette Blount got a 1-yard touchdown run.

With the win, the Steelers got their first 3–0 start since 2007.

==== Week 4: vs. Baltimore Ravens ====
Week 4: Baltimore Ravens at Pittsburgh Steelers – Game summary

Quarter	1	2	3	4	Total
**Ravens**	0	10	0	7	**17**
Steelers	7	0	0	7	**14**

at Heinz Field, Pittsburgh, Pennsylvania

- Date: October 3
- Game time: 1:00 pm. EDT
- Game weather: 56 °F (13 °C) (Rain)
- Game attendance: 64,729
- Referee: Ed Hochuli
- TV announcers (CBS): Jim Nantz and Phil Simms
- Recap

Game information

**First quarter**

- PIT – Rashard Mendenhall 1-yard run (Jeff Reed kick). Steelers 7–0. **Drive: 7 plays, 64 yards, 4:08.**

**Second quarter**

- BAL – Willis McGahee 9-yard run (Billy Cundiff kick). Tied 7–7. **Drive: 8 plays, 83 yards, 3:35.**
- BAL – Billy Cundiff 33-yard field goal. Ravens 10–7. **Drive: 14 plays, 48 yards, 5:20.**

**Third quarter**

**Fourth quarter**

- PIT – Rashard Mendenhall 7-yard run (Jeff Reed kick). Steelers 14–10. **Drive: 13 plays, 93 yards, 6:52.**
- BAL – T. J. Houshmandzadeh 18-yard pass from Joe Flacco (Billy Cundiff kick). Ravens 17–14. **Drive: 4 plays, 40 yards, 0:36.**

**Top passers**

- BAL – Joe Flacco – 24/37, 256 yards, TD, INT
- PIT – Charlie Batch – 12/21, 141 yards, INT

**Top rushers**

- BAL – Willis McGahee – 14 rushes, 39 yards, TD
- PIT – Rashard Mendenhall – 25 rushes, 79 yards, 2 TD

**Top receivers**

- BAL – Derrick Mason – 6 receptions, 80 yards
- PIT – Antwaan Randle El – 2 receptions, 50 yards

Coming off their impressive road win over the Buccaneers, the Steelers went home for an AFC North duel with the Baltimore Ravens. Pittsburgh would deliver the opening punch in the first quarter with a 1-yard touchdown run from running back Rashard Mendenhall. The Ravens would take the lead in the second quarter as running back Willis McGahee got a 9-yard touchdown run, followed by kicker Billy Cundiff getting a 33-yard field goal. After a scoreless third quarter, the Steelers would regain the lead as Mendenhall picked up a 7-yard touchdown run. However, Baltimore would get the last laugh as quarterback Joe Flacco completed an 18-yard touchdown pass to wide receiver T. J. Houshmandzadeh with 33 seconds remaining. The Steelers would get the ball back with 20 seconds remaining but quarterback Charlie Batch threw a pass that was picked off by linebacker Ray Lewis, effectively ending the game.

With the loss, Pittsburgh went into their bye week at 3–1.

==== Week 6: vs. Cleveland Browns ====
Week 6: Cleveland Browns at Pittsburgh Steelers – Game summary

Quarter	1	2	3	4	Total
Browns	3	0	0	7	**10**
**Steelers**	0	7	7	14	**28**

at Heinz Field, Pittsburgh, Pennsylvania

- Date: October 17
- Game time: 1:00 pm. EDT
- Game weather: 63 °F (17 °C) (Sunny)
- Game attendance: 65,168
- Referee: Walt Anderson
- TV announcers (CBS): Kevin Harlan and Solomon Wilcots
- Recap

Game information

**First quarter**

- CLE – Phil Dawson 39-yard field goal, 1:51. Browns 3–0. **Drive: 7 plays, 14 yards, 4:16.**

**Second quarter**

- PIT – Mike Wallace 29-yard pass from Ben Roethlisberger (Jeff Reed kick), 10:40. Steelers 7–3. **Drive: 11 plays, 81 yards, 6:11.**

**Third quarter**

- PIT – Hines Ward 8-yard pass from Ben Roethlisberger (Jeff Reed kick), 3:13. Steelers 14–3. **Drive: 5 plays, 96 yards, 1:59.**

**Fourth quarter**

- PIT – Rashard Mendenhall 2-yard run (Jeff Reed kick), 5:50. Steelers 21–3. **Drive: 4 plays, 13 yards, 2:00.**
- CLE – Benjamin Watson 12-yard pass from Colt McCoy (Phil Dawson kick), 4:09. Steelers 21–10. **Drive: 6 plays, 70 yards, 1:41.**
- PIT – Heath Miller 14-yard pass from Ben Roethlisberger (Jeff Reed kick), 1:25. Steelers 28–10. **Drive: 3 plays, 18 yards, 0:17.**

**Top passers**

- CLE – Colt McCoy – 23/33, 281 yards, TD, 2 INT
- PIT – Ben Roethlisberger – 16/27, 257 yards, 3 TD, INT

**Top rushers**

- CLE – Peyton Hillis – 12 rushes, 41 yards
- PIT – Rashard Mendenhall – 27 rushes, 84 yards, TD

**Top receivers**

- CLE – Benjamin Watson – 6 receptions, 88 yards, TD
- PIT – Mike Wallace – 3 receptions, 90 yards, TD

Coming off their bye week, the Steelers stayed at home, donned their throwback uniforms, and played their Week 6 AFC North duel with their archrival, the Cleveland Browns, as quarterback Ben Roethlisberger made his season debut following his four-game suspension.

Pittsburgh trailed in the first quarter as Browns kicker Phil Dawson got a 39-yard field goal. The Steelers answered in the second quarter as Roethlisberger found wide receiver Mike Wallace on a 29-yard touchdown pass.

The Steelers added onto their lead in the third quarter as Roethlisberger connected with wide receiver Hines Ward on an 8-yard touchdown pass. In the fourth quarter, Pittsburgh continued its dominating day as running back Rashard Mendenhall got a 2-yard touchdown run. Cleveland tried to rally as quarterback Colt McCoy completed a 12-yard touchdown pass to tight end Benjamin Watson, but the Steelers pulled away as Roethlisberger connected with tight end Heath Miller on a 14-yard touchdown pass.

With the win, Pittsburgh improved to 4–1.

==== Week 7: at Miami Dolphins ====
Week 7: Pittsburgh Steelers at Miami Dolphins – Game summary

Quarter	1	2	3	4	Total
**Steelers**	0	17	3	3	**23**
Dolphins	6	10	3	3	**22**

at Sun Life Stadium, Miami Gardens, Florida

- Date: October 24
- Game time: 1:00 pm. EDT
- Game weather: 80 °F (27 °C) (Cloudy)
- Game attendance: 69,867
- Referee: Gene Steratore
- TV announcers (CBS): Greg Gumbel and Dan Dierdorf
- http://www.nfl.com/gamecenter/2010102401/2010/REG7/steelers@dolphins

Game information

**First quarter**

- MIA – Dan Carpenter 39-yard field goal. Dolphins 3–0. **Drive: 4 plays, 1 yards, 0:51.**
- MIA – Dan Carpenter 23-yard field goal. Dolphins 6–0. **Drive: 4 plays, 8 yards, 1:53.**

**Second quarter**

- PIT – Jeff Reed 22-yard field goal. Dolphins 6–3. **Drive: 13 plays, 86 yards, 8:20.**
- PIT – Hines Ward 21-yard pass from Ben Roethlisberger (Jeff Reed kick). Steelers 10–6. **Drive: 5 plays, 34 yards, 1:44.**
- MIA – Dan Carpenter 22-yard field goal. Steelers 10–9. **Drive: 11 plays, 69 yards, 5:08.**
- PIT – Mike Wallace 53-yard pass from Ben Roethlisberger (Jeff Reed kick). Steelers 17–9. **Drive: 1 plays, 53 yards, 0:16.**
- MIA – Davone Bess 26-yard pass from Chad Henne (Dan Carpenter kick). Steelers 17–16. **Drive: 9 plays, 80 yards, 3:57.**

**Third quarter**

- PIT – Jeff Reed 39-yard field goal. Steelers 20–16. **Drive: 10 plays, 46 yards, 5:32.**
- MIA – Dan Carpenter 37-yard field goal. Steelers 20–19. **Drive: 9 plays, 52 yards, 4:24.**

**Fourth quarter**

- MIA – Dan Carpenter 40-yard field goal. Dolphins 22–20. **Drive: 7 plays, 52 yards, 3:27.**
- PIT – Jeff Reed 18-yard field goal. Steelers 23–22. **Drive: 8 plays, 47 yards, 2:51.**

**Top passers**

- PIT – Ben Roethlisberger – 19/27, 302 yards, 2 TD
- MIA – Chad Henne – 23/36, 257 yards, TD, INT

**Top rushers**

- PIT – Rashard Mendenhall – 15 rushes, 37 yards
- MIA – Ricky Williams – 11 rushes, 48 yards

**Top receivers**

- PIT – Hines Ward – 7 receptions, 131 yards, TD
- MIA – Davone Bess – 6 receptions, 66 yards, TD

Coming off their home win over the Browns, the Steelers flew to Sun Life Stadium for a Week 7 intraconference duel with the Miami Dolphins. Pittsburgh trailed in the first quarter as Dolphins kicker Dan Carpenter made a 39-yard and a 23-yard field goal. The Steelers took the lead in the second quarter with a 22-yard field goal from kicker Jeff Reed, followed by quarterback Ben Roethlisberger hooking up with wide receiver Hines Ward on a 21-yard touchdown pass. Miami answered with Carpenter getting a 22-yard field goal, yet Pittsburgh came right back as Roethlisberger found wide receiver Mike Wallace on a 53-yard touchdown pass. The Dolphins would close out the half with quarterback Chad Henne completing a 25-yard touchdown pass to wide receiver Davone Bess.

In the third quarter, the Steelers added onto their lead as Reed booted a 39-yard field goal. Miami answered with Carpenter making a 37-yard field goal. Miami retook the lead in the fourth quarter as Carpenter got a 40-yard field goal, yet Pittsburgh struck back as Reed got an 18-yard field goal. The Dolphins tried to rally, but the Pittsburgh defense stiffened and held for the victory.

With the win, the Steelers improved to 5–1.

==== Week 8: at New Orleans Saints ====
Week 8: Pittsburgh Steelers at New Orleans Saints – Game summary

Quarter	1	2	3	4	Total
Steelers	0	3	0	7	**10**
**Saints**	0	3	3	14	**20**

at Louisiana Superdome, New Orleans, Louisiana

- Date: October 31
- Game time: 8:20 pm. EDT
- Game weather: Dome
- Game attendance: 70,011
- Referee: Pete Morelli
- TV announcers (NBC): Al Michaels, Cris Collinsworth and Andrea Kremer
- Game Book Recap

Game information

**First quarter**

- No scoring plays.

**Second quarter**

- PIT – Jeff Reed 19-yard field goal. Steelers 3–0. **Drive: 11 plays, 43 yards, 6:11.**
- NO – Garrett Hartley 31-yard field goal. Tied 3–3. **Drive: 7 plays, 46 yards, 1:03.**

**Third quarter**

- NO – Garrett Hartley 23-yard field goal. Saints 6–3. **Drive: 12 plays, 51 yards, 6:36.**

**Fourth quarter**

- NO – Marques Colston 16-yard pass from Drew Brees (Garrett Hartley kick). Saints 13–3. **Drive: 10 plays, 59 yards, 6:13.**
- PIT – Rashard Mendenhall 38-yard run (Jeff Reed kick). Saints 13–10. **Drive: 4 plays, 68 yards, 2:07.**
- NO – Lance Moore 8-yard pass from Drew Brees (Garrett Hartley kick). Saints 20–10. **Drive: 8 plays, 55 yards, 3:47.**

**Top passers**

- PIT – Ben Roethlisberger – 17/28, 195 yards, INT
- NO – Drew Brees – 34/44, 305 yards, 2 TD, INT

**Top rushers**

- PIT – Rashard Mendenhall – 15 rushes, 71 yards, TD
- NO – Julius Jones – 7 receptions, 16 yards

**Top receivers**

- PIT – Mike Wallace – 3 receptions, 43 yards
- NO – Robert Meachem – 6 receptions, 76 yards

Coming off their road win over the Dolphins, the Steelers flew to the Louisiana Superdome for a Week 8 interconference duel with the New Orleans Saints on Sunday night. After a scoreless first quarter, Pittsburgh struck first in the second quarter with a 19-yard field goal from kicker Jeff Reed. The Saints answered with a 31-yard field goal from kicker Garrett Hartley.

New Orleans took the lead as Hartley got a 23-yard field goal. In the fourth quarter, the Saints increased their lead as quarterback Drew Brees completed a 16-yard touchdown pass to wide receiver Marques Colston. The Steelers responded with a 38-yard touchdown run from running back Rashard Mendenhall, but New Orleans struck back with Brees completing an 8-yard touchdown pass to wide receiver Lance Moore.

With the loss, Pittsburgh fell to 5–2.

==== Week 9: at Cincinnati Bengals ====
Week 9: Pittsburgh Steelers at Cincinnati Bengals – Game summary

Quarter	1	2	3	4	Total
**Steelers**	10	10	0	7	**27**
Bengals	0	7	0	14	**21**

at Paul Brown Stadium, Cincinnati, Ohio

- Date: November 8
- Game time: 8:30 pm. EST
- Game weather: 44 °F (7 °C) (Clear)
- Game attendance: 65,626
- Referee: Ron Winter
- TV announcers (ESPN): Mike Tirico, Ron Jaworski, Jon Gruden and Suzy Kolber
- Recap

Game information

**First quarter**

- PIT – Rashard Mendenhall 1-yard run (Jeff Reed kick). Steelers 7–0. **Drive: 4 plays, 25 yards, 1:55.**
- PIT – Jeff Reed 25-yard field goal. Steelers 10–0. **Drive: 6 plays, 23 yards, 2:17.**

**Second quarter**

- CIN – Terrell Owens 19-yard pass from Carson Palmer (Mike Nugent kick). Steelers 10–7. **Drive: 4 plays, 38 yards, 2:05.**
- PIT – Hines Ward 8-yard pass from Ben Roethlisberger (Jeff Reed kick). Steelers 17–7. **Drive: 6 plays, 52 yards, 3:03.**
- PIT – Jeff Reed 53-yard field goal. Steelers 20–7. **Drive: 5 plays, 24 yards, 0:40.**

**Third quarter**

**Fourth quarter**

- PIT – Mike Wallace 39-yard pass from Antwaan Randle El (Jeff Reed kick). Steelers 27–7. **Drive: 5 plays, 56 yards, 2:40.**
- CIN – Terrel Owens 27-yard pass from Carson Palmer (Mike Nugent kick). Steelers 27–14. **Drive: 5 plays, 66 yards, 1:38.**
- CIN – Cedric Benson 1-yard run (Mike Nugent kick). Steelers 27–21. **Drive: 2 plays, 36 yards, 1:01.**

**Top passers**

- PIT – Ben Roethlisberger – 17/27, 163 yards, TD, INT
- CIN – Carson Palmer – 22/36, 248 yards, 2 TD, INT

**Top rushers**

- PIT – Rashard Mendenhall – 22 rushes, 99 yards, TD
- CIN – Cedric Benson – 18 rushes, 54 yards, TD

**Top receivers**

- PIT – Mike Wallace – 5 receptions, 110 yards, TD
- CIN – Terrell Owens – 10 receptions, 141 yards, 2 TD

Hoping to rebound from their road loss to the Saints, the Steelers flew to Paul Brown Stadium for a Week 9 AFC North duel with the Cincinnati Bengals on Monday night. Pittsburgh delivered the opening strike in the first quarter as running back Rashard Mendenhall got a 1-yard touchdown run, followed by a 25-yard field goal from kicker Jeff Reed. The Bengals answered in the second quarter as quarterback Carson Palmer completed a 19-yard touchdown pass to wide receiver Terrell Owens, yet the Steelers responded with quarterback Ben Roethlisberger hooking up with wide receiver Hines Ward on an 8-yard touchdown pass, followed by Reed's 53-yard field goal. After a scoreless third quarter, Pittsburgh added onto their lead in the fourth quarter as wide receiver Antwaan Randle El found wide receiver Mike Wallace on a 39-yard touchdown pass. Cincinnati tried to rally as Palmer completed a 27-yard touchdown pass to Owens, followed by running back Cedric Benson getting a 1-yard touchdown run, thanks in no small part to two consecutive penalties called against the Steelers, both of which were later deemed by the NFL to have been incorrect. Fortunately, the defense held on to preserve the victory.

With the win, the Steelers improved to 6–2.

==== Week 10: vs. New England Patriots ====
Week 10: New England Patriots at Pittsburgh Steelers – Game summary

Quarter	1	2	3	4	Total
**Patriots**	10	0	13	16	**39**
Steelers	0	3	0	23	**26**

at Heinz Field, Pittsburgh, Pennsylvania

- Date: November 14
- Game time: 8:20 pm. EST
- Game weather: 44 °F (7 °C) (Cloudy)
- Game attendance: 64,359
- Referee: Carl Cheffers
- TV announcers (NBC): Al Michaels, Cris Collinsworth and Andrea Kremer
- Recap

Game information

summary **First quarter**

- NE – Rob Gronkowski 19-yard pass from Tom Brady (Shayne Graham kick). Patriots 7–0. **Drive: 8 plays, 70 yards, 4:07.**
- NE – Shayne Graham 31-yard field goal. Patriots 10–0. **Drive: 10 plays, 46 yards, 5:26.**

**Second quarter**

- PIT – Jeff Reed 22-yard field goal. Patriots 10–3. **Drive: 10 plays, 76 yards, 5:22.**

**Third quarter**

- NE – Rob Gronkowski 9-yard pass from Tom Brady (Shayne Graham kick). Patriots 17–3. **Drive: 10 plays, 78 yards, 5:12.**
- NE – Tom Brady 3-yard run (kick failed, wr). Patriots 23–3. **Drive: 7 plays, 80 yards, 3:18.**

**Fourth quarter**

- PIT – Emmanuel Sanders 6-yard pass from Ben Roethlisberger (Jeff Reed kick). Patriots 23–10. **Drive: 7 plays, 71 yards, 3:11.**
- NE – James Sanders 32-yard interception return (pass failed). Patriots 29–10.
- PIT – Mike Wallace from Ben Roethlisberger (Mewelde Moore run). Patriots 29–18. **Drive: 5 plays, 53 yards, 1:48.**
- NE – Rob Gronkowski 25-yard pass from Tom Brady (Shayne Graham kick). Patriots 36–18. **Drive: 5 plays, 41 yards, 2:21.**
- PIT – Mike Wallace 33-yard pass from Ben Roethlisberger (Mewelde Moore run). Patriots 36–26. **Drive: 5 plays, 80 yards, 1:24.**
- NE – Shayne Grahan 36-yard field goal. Patriots 39–26. **Drive: 5 plays, 15 yards, 1:06.**

**Top passers**

- NE – Tom Brady – 30/43, 350 yards, 3 TD
- PIT – Ben Roethlisberger – 30/49, 387 yards, 3 TD, INT

**Top rushers**

- NE – BenJarvus Green-Ellis – 18 rushes, 87 yards
- PIT – Rashard Mendenhall – 11 rushes, 50 yards

**Top receivers**

- NE – Wes Welker – 8 receptions, 89 yards
- PIT – Mike Wallace – 8 receptions, 136 yards, 2 TD

The Steelers' ninth game was an AFC duel with the Patriots. The Steelers trailed early as QB Tom Brady made a 19-yard TD pass to TE Rob Gronkowski. This was followed by kicker Shayne Graham getting a 31-yard field goal. The Steelers responded in the second quarter with kicker Jeff Reed nailing a 22-yard field goal. The Steelers struggled further when Brady threw another TD pass to Gronkowski, this one from 9 yards out. That was followed by Brady's scramble 3 yards to the endzone for a touchdown (With a failed PAT as the kick went wide-right). The Steelers scored first in the 4th quarter when QB Ben Roethlisberger completed a 6-yard TD pass to WR Emmanuel Sanders. The Steelers looked to create another scoring drive, but it came to a halt when Roethlisberger's pass was intercepted by SS James Sanders and returned 32 yards for a touchdown (With a failed 2-point conversion). The Steelers tried to cut the lead with a Roethlisberger 15-yard TD pass to WR Mike Wallace, but the Patriots replied with Brady getting a 25-yard TD pass to Gronkowski. Again the Steelers tried to get closer when Roethlisberger completed a 33-yard TD pass to Wallace, but the Patriots put the game away after Graham hit a 36-yard field goal.

With the loss, the Steelers fell to 6–3.

==== Week 11: vs. Oakland Raiders ====
Week 11: Oakland Raiders at Pittsburgh Steelers – Game summary

Quarter	1	2	3	4	Total
Raiders	3	0	0	0	**3**
**Steelers**	0	21	0	14	**35**

at Heinz Field, Pittsburgh, Pennsylvania

- Date: November 21
- Game time: 1:00 pm. EST
- Game weather: 63 °F (17 °C) (Sunny)
- Game attendance: 64,987
- Referee: Tony Corrente
- TV announcers (CBS): Ian Eagle and Dan Fouts
- Recap

Game information

**First quarter**

- OAK – Sebastian Janikowski 41-yard field goal. Raiders 3–0. **Drive: 7 plays, 49 yards, 3:27.**

**Second quarter**

- PIT – Rashard Mendenhall 5-yard run (Shaun Suisham kick). Steelers 7–3. **Drive: 14 plays, 85 yards, 8:06.**
- PIT – Ben Roethlisberger 16-yard run (Shaun Suisham kick). Steelers 14–3. **Drive: 7 plays, 56 yards, 3:30.**
- PIT – Emmanuel Sanders 22-yard pass from Ben Roethlisberger (Shaun Suisham kick). Steelers 21–3. **Drive: 4 plays, 35 yards, 1:23.**

**Third quarter**

- No scoring plays.

**Fourth quarter**

- PIT – Mike Wallace 52-yard pass from Ben Roethlisberger (Shaun Suisham kick). Steelers 28–3. **Drive: 2 plays, 54 yards, 0:18.**
- PIT – Isaac Redman 16-yard pass from Ben Roethlisberger (Shaun Suisham kick). Steelers 35–3. **Drive: 5 plays, 41 yards, 2:24.**

**Top passers**

- OAK – Bruce Gradkowski – 13/24, 98 yards, INT
- PIT – Ben Roethlisberger – 18/29, 275 yards, 3 TD

**Top rushers**

- OAK – Michael Bush – 4 rushes, 33 yards
- PIT – Rashard Mendenhall – 23 rushes, 59 yards, TD

**Top receivers**

- OAK – Johnnie Lee Higgins – 4 receptions, 37 yards
- PIT – Mike Wallace – 3 receptions, 116 yards, TD

Hoping to rebound from their loss to the Patriots, the Steelers stayed at home for a Week 11 duel with the Oakland Raiders. Pittsburgh trailed early in the first quarter as Raiders kicker Sebastian Janikowski made a 41-yard field goal. However that would turn out to be the Raiders' only points of the game. The Steelers took the lead in the second quarter with a 5-yard touchdown run from running back Rashard Mendenhall, followed by quarterback Ben Roethlisberger's 16-yard touchdown run and his 22-yard touchdown pass to rookie wide receiver Emmanuel Sanders. After a scoreless third quarter, the Steelers added onto their lead in the fourth quarter as Roethlisberger found wide receiver Mike Wallace on a 52-yard touchdown pass. Afterwards, Pittsburgh punctuated the game with a 16-yard touchdown pass to running back Isaac Redman.

With the win, the Steelers improved to 7–3.

==== Week 12: at Buffalo Bills ====
Week 12: Pittsburgh Steelers at Buffalo Bills – Game summary

Quarter	1	2	3	4	OT	Total
**Steelers**	7	6	0	3	3	**19**
Bills	0	0	7	9	0	**16**

at Ralph Wilson Stadium, Orchard Park, New York

- Date: November 28
- Game time: 1:00 pm. EST
- Game weather: 36 °F (2 °C) (Cloudy)
- Game attendance: 69,642
- Referee: John Parry
- TV announcers (CBS): Kevin Harlan and Solomon Wilcots
- Recap

Game information

**First quarter**

- PIT – Rashard Mendenhall 1-yard run (Shaun Suisham kick). Steelers 7–0. **Drive: 13 plays, 78 yards, 7:54.**

**Second quarter**

- PIT – Shaun Suisham 45-yard field goal. Steelers 10–0. **Drive: 14 plays, 51 yards, 6:12.**
- PIT – Shaun Suisham 46-yard field goal. Steelers 13–0. **Drive: 8 plays, 54 yards, 1:39.**

**Third quarter**

- BUF – Fred Jackson 65-yard pass from Ryan Fitzpatrick (Rian Lindell kick). Steelers 13–7. **Drive: 4 plays, 80 yards, 1:09.**

**Fourth quarter**

- BUF – Rian Lindell 29-yard field goal. Steelers 13–10. **Drive: 11 plays, 69 yards, 3:45.**
- BUF – Rian Lindell 32-yard field goal. Tied 13–13. **Drive: 4 plays, 9 yards, 1:47.**
- PIT – Shaun Suisham 48-yard field goal. Steelers 16–13. **Drive: 9 plays, 50 yards, 5:06.**
- BUF – Rian Lindell 49-yard field goal. Tied 16–16. **Drive: 6 plays, 23 yards, 0:44.**

**Overtime**

- PIT – Shaun Suisham 41-yard field goal. Steelers 19–16. **Drive: 13 plays, 58 yards, 7:06.**

**Top passers**

- PIT – Ben Roethlisberger – 20/33, 246 yards
- BUF – Ryan Fitzpatrick – 23/45, 265 yards, TD, INT

**Top rushers**

- PIT – Rashard Mendenhall – 36 rushes, 151 yards, TD
- BUF – Fred Jackson – 12 yards, 59 yards

**Top receivers**

- PIT – Hines Ward – 7 receptions, 107 yards
- BUF – Fred Jackson – 5 receptions, 104 yards, TD

Coming off their win over the Raiders, the Steelers flew to Ralph Wilson Stadium for a Week 12 intraconference duel with the Buffalo Bills. Pittsburgh delivered the opening punch in the first quarter with a 1-yard touchdown run from running back Rashard Mendenhall. The Steelers would add onto their lead in the second quarter with a 45-yard and a 46-yard field goal from kicker Shaun Suisham. Suisham sets the NFL record with all 4 FGs being 40+ yards & with the OT game winner.

The Bills answered in the third quarter with quarterback Ryan Fitzpatrick completing a 65-yard touchdown pass to running back Fred Jackson. Buffalo continued to creep closer in the fourth quarter as kicker Rian Lindell got a 29-yard and a 32-yard field goal. Pittsburgh regained the lead with Suisham's 48-yard field goal, but the Bills tied the game again with Lindell making a 49-yard field goal. In overtime, the Steelers got the last laugh as Suisham nailed the game-ending 41-yard field goal.

With the win, Pittsburgh improved to 8–3.

==== Week 13: at Baltimore Ravens ====
Week 13: Pittsburgh Steelers at Baltimore Ravens – Game summary

Quarter	1	2	3	4	Total
**Steelers**	0	0	3	10	**13**
Ravens	7	0	3	0	**10**

at M&T Bank Stadium, Baltimore, Maryland

- Date: December 5
- Game time: 8:20 pm. EST
- Game weather: 35 °F (2 °C) (Partly Cloudy)
- Game attendance: 71,418
- Referee: Terry McAulay
- TV announcers (NBC): Al Michaels, Cris Collinsworth and Andrea Kremer
- Recap

Game information

**First quarter**

- BAL – Anquan Boldin 14-yard pass from Joe Flacco (Billy Cundiff kick). Ravens 7–0. **Drive: 10 plays, 92 yards, 7:10.**

**Second quarter**

**Third quarter**

- PIT – Shaun Suisham 45-yard field goal. Ravens 7–3. **Drive: 8 plays, 53 yards, 4:06.**
- BAL – Billy Cundiff 24-yard field goal. Ravens 10–3. **Drive: 13 plays, 60 yards, 3:41.**

**Fourth quarter**

- PIT – Shaun Suisham 19-yard field goal. Ravens 10–6. **Drive: 16 plays, 79 yards, 9:27.**
- PIT – Isaac Redman 9-yard pass from Ben Roethlisberger (Shaun Suisham kick). Steelers 13–10. **Drive: 3 plays, 9 yards, 0:22.**

**Top passers**

- PIT – Ben Roethlisberger – 22/38, 253 yards, TD, INT
- BAL – Joe Flacco – 17/33, 266 yards, TD

**Top rushers**

- PIT – Rashard Mendenhall – 19 rushes, 45 yards
- BAL – Ray Rice – 9 rushes, 32 yards

**Top receivers**

- PIT – Mike Wallace – 5 receptions, 76 yards
- BAL – Anquan Boldin – 5 receptions, 118 yards, TD

Coming off their overtime win over the Bills, the Steelers flew to M&T Bank Stadium for a Week 13 AFC North rematch with the Baltimore Ravens on Sunday night. Pittsburgh trailed in the first quarter as Ravens quarterback Joe Flacco completed a 14-yard touchdown pass to wide receiver Anquan Boldin. After a scoreless second quarter, Pittsburgh answered in the third quarter with a 45-yard field goal from kicker Shaun Suisham. Baltimore would respond with kicker Billy Cundiff getting a 24-yard field goal. After adding a 19-yarder from Suisham, the Steelers defense would set up a 1st and Goal after safety Troy Polamalu stripped the ball from Ravens quarterback Joe Flacco with less than three and a half minutes to go, safety Troy Polamalu's sack on Flacco forced a fumble, allowing linebacker LaMarr Woodley to recover the ball and return it to the Baltimore 9, which was followed by quarterback Ben Roethlisberger finding running back Isaac Redman on a 9-yard touchdown pass on third down. The Ravens tried to rally, but Pittsburgh's defense held on to prevail with the victory.

With the win, not only did the Steelers improve to 9–3, but it also allowed them to take the AFC North division lead for the first time since week 4.

==== Week 14: vs. Cincinnati Bengals ====
Week 14: Cincinnati Bengals at Pittsburgh Steelers – Game summary

Quarter	1	2	3	4	Total
Bengals	7	0	0	0	**7**
**Steelers**	0	10	3	10	**23**

at Heinz Field, Pittsburgh, Pennsylvania

- Date: December 12
- Game time: 1:00 pm. EST
- Game weather: 38 °F (3 °C) (Light Rain)
- Game attendance: 57,501
- Referee: Walt Coleman
- TV announcers (CBS): Greg Gumbel and Dan Dierdorf
- Recap

Game information

**First quarter**

- CIN – Andrew Whitworth 1-yard pass from Carson Palmer (Clint Stitser kick). Bengals 7–0. **Drive: 8 plays, 69 yards, 5:02.**

**Second quarter**

- PIT – Troy Polamalu 45-yard interception return (Shaun Suisham kick). Tied 7–7.
- PIT – Shaun Suisham 23-yard field goal. Steelers 10–7. **Drive: 13 plays, 75 yards, 2:00.**

**Third quarter**

- PIT – Shaun Suisham 35-yard field goal. Steelers 13–7. **Drive: 10 plays, 54 yards, 6:26.**

**Fourth quarter**

- PIT – LaMarr Woodley 14-yard interception return (Shaun Suisham kick). Steelers 20–7.
- PIT – Shaun Suisham 41-yard field goal. Steelers 23–7. **Drive: 7 plays, 45 yards, 4:16.**

**Top passers**

- CIN – Carson Palmer – 20/32, 178 yards, TD, 3 INT
- PIT – Ben Roethlisberger – 21/33, 258 yards

**Top rushers**

- CIN – Cedric Benson – 8 rushes, 19 yards
- PIT – Rashard Mendenhall – 18 rushes, 66 yards

**Top receivers**

- CIN – Chad Ochocinco – 6 receptions, 71 yards
- PIT – Hines Ward – 8 receptions, 115 yards

Coming off their win over the Ravens, the Steelers went home for a Week 14 AFC North rematch with the Cincinnati Bengals. Pittsburgh trailed early in the first quarter as Bengals quarterback Carson Palmer completed a 1-yard touchdown pass to offensive tackle Andrew Whitworth. The Steelers took the lead in the second quarter with safety Troy Polamalu returning an interception 45 yards for a touchdown, followed by a 23-yard field goal from kicker Shaun Suisham.

Pittsburgh increased their lead in the third quarter with Suisham's 35-yard field goal. Afterwards, the Steelers pulled away in the fourth quarter with linebacker LaMarr Woodley returning an interception 14 yards for a touchdown, followed by Suisham booting a 41-yard field goal.

With the win, Pittsburgh improved to 10–3.

==== Week 15: vs. New York Jets ====
Week 15: New York Jets at Pittsburgh Steelers – Game summary

Quarter	1	2	3	4	Total
**Jets**	7	3	7	5	**22**
Steelers	0	10	7	0	**17**

at Heinz Field, Pittsburgh, Pennsylvania

- Date: December 19
- Game time: 4:15 pm. EST
- Game weather: 23 °F (−5 °C) (Light Snow)
- Game attendance: 62,568
- Referee: Pete Morelli
- TV announcers (CBS): Jim Nantz and Phil Simms
- Recap

Game information

**First quarter**

- NYJ – Brad Smith 97-yard kickoff return (Nick Folk kick). Jets 7–0. **Drive: 0 plays, 0 yards, 0:12.**

**Second quarter**

- PIT – Matt Spaeth 9-yard pass from Ben Roethlisberger (Shaun Suisham kick). Tied 7–7. **Drive: 16 plays, 96 yards, 8:12.**
- NYJ – Nick Folk 25-yard field goal. Jets 10–7. **Drive: 9 plays, 56 yards, 4:41.**
- PIT – Shaun Suisham 42-yard field goal. Tied 10–10. **Drive: 10 plays, 53 yards, 2:15.**

**Third quarter**

- PIT – Rashard Mendenhall 2-yard run (Shaun Suisham kick). Steelers 17–10. **Drive: 9 plays, 74 yards, 5:57.**
- NYJ – Mark Sanchez 7-yard run (Nick Folk kick). Tied 17–17. **Drive: 8 plays, 66 yards, 3:49.**

**Fourth quarter**

- NYJ – Nick Folk 34-yard field goal. Jets 20–17. **Drive: 13 plays, 50 yards, 6:47.**
- NYJ – Mewelde Moore tackled in endzone by Jason Taylor for a safety. Jets 22–17.

**Top passers**

- NYJ – Mark Sanchez – 19/29, 170 yards
- PIT – Ben Roethlisberger – 23/44, 264 yards, TD

**Top rushers**

- NYJ – LaDainian Tomlinson – 11 rushes, 49 yards
- PIT – Rashard Mendenhall – 17 rushes, 100 yards, TD

**Top receivers**

- NYJ – Braylon Edwards – 8 receptions, 100 yards
- PIT – Mike Wallace – 7 receptions, 102 yards

Coming off their win over the Bengals, the Steelers stayed at home for a Week 15 intraconference duel with the New York Jets. Pittsburgh immediately trailed in the first quarter with Jets wide receiver/quarterback Brad Smith returning the game's opening kickoff 97 yards for a touchdown. The Steelers answered in the second quarter with quarterback Ben Roethlisberger finding tight end Matt Spaeth on a 9-yard touchdown. New York struck back with kicker Nick Folk making a 25-yard field goal, yet Pittsburgh tied the game with a 42-yard field goal from kicker Shaun Suisham.

The Steelers took the lead in the third quarter with a 2-yard touchdown run from running back Rashard Mendenhall, but the Jets replied with quarterback Mark Sanchez getting a 7-yard touchdown run. New York took back their lead in the fourth quarter with Folk booting a 34-yard field goal, followed by linebacker Jason Taylor tackling running back Mewelde Moore in the endzone for a safety. Pittsburgh tried to rally, but the Jets defense would hold on to preserve the win.

With the loss, the Steelers fell to 10–4.

==== Week 16: vs. Carolina Panthers ====
Week 16: Carolina Panthers at Pittsburgh Steelers – Game summary

Quarter	1	2	3	4	Total
Panthers	0	0	0	3	**3**
**Steelers**	3	17	7	0	**27**

at Heinz Field, Pittsburgh, Pennsylvania

- Date: December 23
- Game time: 8:20 pm. EST
- Game weather: 27 °F (−3 °C) (Light Snow)
- Game attendance: 61,748
- Referee: Bill Leavy
- TV announcers (NFLN): Bob Papa, Matt Millen and Joe Theismann
- Recap

Game information

**First quarter**

- PIT – Shaun Suisham 26-yard field goal. PIT 3–0. **Drive: 8 plays, 72 yards, 4:09.**

**Second quarter**

- PIT – Mike Wallace 43-yard pass from Ben Roethlisberger (Shaun Suisham kick). PIT 10–0. **Drive: 3 plays, 58 yards, 1:29.**
- PIT – Rashard Mendenhall 1-yard run (Shaun Suisham kick). PIT 17–0. **Drive: 8 plays, 72 yards, 4:42.**
- PIT – Shaun Suisham 29-yard field goal. PIT 20–0. **Drive: 6 plays, 47 yards, 0:47.**

**Third quarter**

- PIT – Ben Roethlisberger 1-yard run (Shaun Suisham kick). PIT 27–0. **Drive: 7 plays, 35 yards, 3:43.**

**Fourth quarter**

- CAR – John Kasay 27-yard field goal. PIT 27–3. **Drive: 6 plays, 14 yards, 2:46.**

**Top passers**

- CAR – Jimmy Clausen – 10/23, 72 yards, 3 INT
- PIT – Ben Roethlisberger – 22/32, 320 yards, TD

**Top rushers**

- CAR – Jonathan Stewart – 18 rushes, 71 yards
- PIT – Rashard Mendenhall – 18 rushes, 65 yards, TD

**Top receivers**

- CAR – Mike Goodson – 2 receptions, 23 yards
- PIT – Mike Wallace – 4 receptions, 104 yards, TD

Hoping to rebound from their loss to the Jets, the Steelers stayed at home for a Week 16 interconference duel with the Carolina Panthers on Thursday night. Pittsburgh delivered the game's opening punch in the first quarter with a 26-yard field goal from kicker Shaun Suisham. The Steelers added onto their lead in the second quarter as Roethlisberger found wide receiver Mike Wallace on a 43-yard touchdown pass, followed by a 1-yard touchdown run from running back Rashard Mendenhall and a 29-yard field goal from Suisham.

Pittsburgh continued their dominating night in the third quarter with Roethlisberger's 1-yard touchdown run. The Panthers would close out the game in the fourth quarter as kicker John Kasay got a 27-yard field goal.

With the win, the Steelers improved to 11–4.

==== Week 17: at Cleveland Browns ====
Week 17: Pittsburgh Steelers at Cleveland Browns – Game summary

Quarter	1	2	3	4	Total
**Steelers**	14	17	7	3	**41**
Browns	0	3	0	6	**9**

at Cleveland Browns Stadium, Cleveland, Ohio

- Date: January 2
- Game time: 1:00 pm. EST
- Game weather: 25 °F (−4 °C) (Sunny)
- Game attendance: 68,303
- Referee: Ron Winter
- TV announcers (CBS): Ian Eagle and Dan Fouts
- Recap

Game information

**First quarter**

- PIT – Mike Wallace 56-yard pass from Ben Roethlisberger (Shaun Suisham kick) PIT 7–0. **Drive: 1 play, 56 yards, 0:08.**
- PIT – Rashard Mendenhall 1-yard run (Shaun Suisham kick) PIT 14–0. **Drive: 10 plays, 71 yards, 4:38.**

**Second quarter**

- CLE – Phil Dawson 19-yard field goal PIT 14–3. **Drive: 15 plays, 80 yards, 7:14.**
- PIT – Rashard Mendenhall 1-yard run (Shaun Suisham kick) PIT 21–3. **Drive: 11 plays, 74 yards, 6:52.**
- PIT – Heath Miller 4-yard pass from Ben Roethlisberger (Shaun Suisham kick) PIT 28–3. **Drive: 3 plays, 24 yards, 1:35.**
- PIT – Shaun Suisham 41-yard field goal PIT 31–3. **Drive: 7 plays, 53 yards, 1:03.**

**Third quarter**

- PIT – Hines Ward 3-yard pass from Antwaan Randle El (Shaun Suisham kick) PIT 38–3. **Drive: 13 plays, 77 yards, 7:42.**

**Fourth quarter**

- PIT – Shaun Suisham 24-yard field goal PIT 41–3. **Drive: 10 plays, 52 yards, 4:56.**
- CLE – Brian Robiskie 20-yard pass from Colt McCoy (pass failed) PIT 41–9. **Drive: 12 plays, 88 yards, 5:59.**

**Top passers**

- PIT – Ben Roethlisberger – 15/22, 280 yards, TD
- CLE – Colt McCoy – 20/41, 209 yards, TD, 3 INT

**Top rushers**

- PIT – Rashard Mendenhall – 14 rushes, 36 yards, 2 TD
- CLE – Colt McCoy – 4 rushes, 19 yards

**Top receivers**

- PIT – Mike Wallace – 3 receptions, 105 yards, TD
- CLE – Benjamin Watson – 7 receptions, 67 yards

Coming off their win over the Panthers, the Steelers made the two-hour bus trip north to Cleveland Browns Stadium for a Week 17 AFC North rematch with the Cleveland Browns. Pittsburgh took the early lead in the first quarter as quarterback Ben Roethlisberger found wide receiver Mike Wallace on a 56-yard touchdown pass, followed by a 1-yard touchdown run from running back Rashard Mendenhall. The Browns got on the board in the second quarter as kicker Phil Dawson got a 19-yard field goal, yet the Steelers struck back with another 1-yard touchdown run by Mendenhall, followed by Roethlisberger's 4-yard TD pass to tight end Heath Miller and kicker Shaun Suisham nailing a 41-yard field goal.

Pittsburgh added onto their lead in the third quarter as wide receiver Antwaan Randle El connected with wide receiver Hines Ward on a 3-yard touchdown pass. Afterwards, the Steelers closed out their dominating day with Suisham's 24-yard field goal. Cleveland closed out the game with quarterback Colt McCoy completing a 20-yard TD pass to wide receiver Brian Robiskie (with a failed two-point conversion).

With the win, not only did Pittsburgh close out their regular season at 12–4, but they also locked up the AFC's No. 2 seed.

== Postseason ==
=== Schedule ===
Week	Date	Kickoff (ET)	TV	Opponent	Result	Game Site	NFL Recap
Wild Card	Bye Week						
Divisional	January 15	4:30 p.m.	CBS	Baltimore Ravens	W 31–24	Heinz Field	Recap
Conference	January 23	6:30 p.m.	CBS	New York Jets	W 24–19	Heinz Field	Recap
Super Bowl	February 6	6:25 p.m.	FOX	vs. Green Bay Packers	L 25–31	Cowboys Stadium	Recap

=== Game summaries ===
==== AFC Divisional Round: vs. Baltimore Ravens ====
AFC Divisional Round: Baltimore Ravens at Pittsburgh Steelers – Game summary

Quarter	1	2	3	4	Total
Ravens	14	7	0	3	24
Steelers	7	0	14	10	31

at Heinz Field, Pittsburgh, Pennsylvania

- Date: January 15
- Game time: 4:30 pm. EST
- Game weather: 32 °F (0 °C) (Cloudy)
- Game attendance: 64,879
- Referee: Jeff Triplette
- TV announcers (CBS): Greg Gumbel & Dan Dierdorf
- Recap, Gamebook

Game information

First quarter

- PIT – Rashard Mendenhall 1-yard run (Shaun Suisham kick). PIT 7–0. Drive: 10 plays, 80 yards, 6:04.
- BAL – Ray Rice 14-yard run (Billy Cundiff kick). Tied 7–7. Drive: 10 plays, 68 yards, 4:58.
- BAL – Cory Redding 13-yard fumble return (Billy Cundiff kick). Ravens 14–7

Second quarter

- BAL – Todd Heap 4-yard pass from Joe Flacco (Billy Cundiff kick). BAL 21–7. Drive: 6 plays, 16 yards, 3:02.

Third quarter

- PIT – Heath Miller 9-yard pass from Ben Roethlisberger (Shaun Suisham kick). BAL 21–14. Drive: 2 plays, 23 yards, 0:53.
- PIT – Hines Ward 8-yard pass from Ben Roethlisberger (Shaun Suisham kick). Tied 21–21. Drive: 4 plays, 25 yards, 2:17.

Fourth quarter

- PIT – Shaun Suisham 35-yard field goal. PIT 24–21. Drive: 8 plays, 6 yards, 3:49.
- BAL – Billy Cundiff 24-yard field goal. Tied 24–24. Drive: 5 plays, 23 yards, 2:01.
- PIT – Rashard Mendenhall 1-yard run (Shaun Suisham kick). PIT 31–24. Drive: 11 plays, 65 yards, 2:21.

Top passers

- BAL – Joe Flacco – 16/30, 125 yards, TD, 2 INT
- PIT – Ben Roethlisberger – 19/32, 226 yards, 2 TD

Top rushers

- BAL – Ray Rice – 12 rushes, 32 yards, TD
- PIT – Rashard Mendenhall – 20 rushes, 46 yards, 2 TD

Top receivers

- BAL – Todd Heap – 3 receptions, 43 yards, TD
- PIT – Antonio Brown – 3 receptions, 75 yards

Entering the postseason as the AFC's No. 2 seed, the Steelers began their playoff run at home in the AFC Divisional Round against their AFC North rival, the No. 5 Baltimore Ravens, for the third time in the season. Pittsburgh delivered the game's opening strike in the first quarter with a 1-yard touchdown run from running back Rashard Mendenhall. The Ravens took the lead with running back Ray Rice getting a 14-yard touchdown run, followed by defensive end Cory Redding returning a fumble 13 yards for a touchdown. Baltimore added onto their lead in the second quarter as quarterback Joe Flacco completed a 4-yard touchdown pass to tight end Todd Heap.

The Steelers struck back to tie in the third quarter as quarterback Ben Roethlisberger found tight end Heath Miller on a 9-yard touchdown pass. Then, he found wide receiver Hines Ward on an 8-yard touchdown pass. Pittsburgh regained the lead in the fourth quarter with a 35-yard field goal from kicker Shaun Suisham, yet the Ravens tied the game with kicker Billy Cundiff getting a 24-yard field goal. Afterwards, the Steelers won the game with another 1-yard touchdown run from Mendenhall.

With the win, Pittsburgh improved its overall record to 13–4. Also, with the New York Jets defeating the top-seeded New England Patriots in the divisional round the next day, Pittsburgh would get to host the AFC Championship Game.

==== AFC Championship Game: vs. New York Jets ====
AFC Championship Game: New York Jets at Pittsburgh Steelers – Game summary

Quarter	1	2	3	4	Total
Jets	0	3	7	9	19
Steelers	7	17	0	0	24

at Heinz Field, Pittsburgh, Pennsylvania

- Date: January 23
- Game time: 6:30 pm. EST
- Game weather: 12 °F (−11 °C) (Clear)
- Game attendance: 66,662
- Referee: Ed Hochuli
- TV announcers (CBS): Jim Nantz, Phil Simms, & Steve Tasker
- Recap, Gamebook

Game information

First quarter

- PIT – Rashard Mendenhall 1-yard run (Shaun Suisham kick). PIT 7–0. Drive: 15 plays, 66 yards, 9:06.

Second quarter

- PIT – Shaun Suisham 20-yard field goal. PIT 10–0. Drive: 8 plays, 60 yards, 3:41.
- PIT – Ben Roethlisberger 2-yard run (Shaun Suisham kick). PIT 17–0. Drive: 7 plays, 66 yards, 3:57.
- PIT – William Gay 19-yard fumble return (Shaun Suisham kick). Steelers 24–0.
- NYJ – Nick Folk 42-yard field goal. Steelers 24–3. Drive: 7 plays, 44 yards, 1:04.

Third quarter

- NYJ – Santonio Holmes 45-yard pass from Mark Sanchez (Nick Folk kick). PIT 24–10. Drive: 5 plays, 90 yards, 2:17.

Fourth quarter

- NYJ – Ben Roethlisberger tackled in the endzone by Mike DeVito for a safety. Steelers 24–12.
- NYJ – Jerricho Cotchery 4-yard pass from Mark Sanchez (Nick Folk kick). PIT 24–19. Drive: 10 plays, 58 yards, 4:32.

Top passers

- NYJ – Mark Sanchez – 16/30, 125 yards, TD, 2 INT
- PIT – Ben Roethlisberger – 19/32, 226 yards, 2 INT

Top rushers

- NYJ – Shonn Greene – 12 rushes, 32 yards, TD
- PIT – Rashard Mendenhall – 20 rushes, 46 yards, 2 TD

Top receivers

- NYJ – Dustin Keller – 3 receptions, 43 yards, TD
- PIT – Heath Miller – 3 receptions, 75 yards

Coming off their win over the Ravens, the Steelers stayed at home for the AFC Championship Game against the No. 6 New York Jets, hoping to avenge their Week 15 loss.

Pittsburgh delivered the game's opening strike with a 1-yard touchdown run from running back Rashard Mendenhall. The Steelers added onto their lead in the second quarter with a 20-yard field goal from kicker Shaun Suisham, followed by a 2-yard touchdown run from quarterback Ben Roethlisberger, along with cornerback William Gay returning a fumble 19 yards for a touchdown. The Jets closed out the half with kicker Nick Folk getting a 42-yard field goal.

New York began the third quarter with quarterback Mark Sanchez completing a 45-yard touchdown pass to former Pittsburgh wide receiver Santonio Holmes. The Jets tried to rally in the fourth quarter as Roethlisberger fumbled the snap and then got tackled by Mike DeVito for a safety, followed by Sanchez completing a 4-yard touchdown pass to wide receiver Jerricho Cotchery, yet Pittsburgh held on to preserve the victory.

With the win, the Steelers improved their overall record to 14–4 while also advancing to Super Bowl XLV, where they were defeated by the NFC Champion, the Green Bay Packers.

==== Super Bowl XLV ====
Super Bowl XLV: Pittsburgh Steelers vs. Green Bay Packers – Game summary

Quarter	1	2	3	4	Total
Steelers	0	10	7	8	25
Packers	14	7	0	10	31

at Cowboys Stadium, Arlington, Texas

- Date: February 6
- Game time: 6:25 pm. EST
- Game weather: None (retractable roof closed)
- Game attendance: 103,219
- TV announcers (FOX): Joe Buck, Troy Aikman, Pam Oliver and Chris Myers
- Recap, Gamebook

Game information

First quarter

- GB – Jordy Nelson 29-yard pass from Aaron Rodgers (Mason Crosby kick). Packers 7–0.
- GB – Nick Collins 37-yard interception return (Mason Crosby kick). Packers 14–0.

Second quarter

- PIT – Shaun Suisham 33-yard field goal. Packers 14–3.
- GB – Greg Jennings 21-yard pass from Aaron Rodgers (Mason Crosby kick). Packers 21–3.
- PIT – Hines Ward 8-yard pass from Ben Roethlisberger (Shaun Suisham kick). Packers 21–10.

Third quarter

- PIT – Rashard Mendenhall 8-yard run (Shaun Suisham kick). Packers 21–17.

Fourth quarter

- GB – Greg Jennings 8-yard pass from Aaron Rodgers (Mason Crosby kick). Packers 28–17.
- PIT – Mike Wallace 25-yard pass from Ben Roethlisberger (Antwaan Randle El run). Packers 28–25.
- GB – Mason Crosby 23-yard field goal. Packers 31–25.

Top passers

- PIT – Ben Roethlisberger – 23/35 243 yards, 2 TD, 2 INT
- GB – Aaron Rodgers – 24/39 304 yards, 3 TD

Top rushers

- PIT – Rashard Mendenhall – 14 rushes, 63 yards, TD
- GB – James Starks – 11 rushes, 52 yards

Top receivers

- PIT – Mike Wallace – 9 receptions, 89 yards, TD
- GB – Jordy Nelson – 9 receptions, 140 yards, TD

This marked the Steelers' eighth appearance in a Super Bowl, tying with the Dallas Cowboys for the most appearances in Super Bowl history. They were denied their seventh ring, however, by the Green Bay Packers, who defeated them 31–25.
