= Doug Whaley =

American football executive and former collegiate player

Personal information
- Born: December 16, 1972 (age 53); Pittsburgh, Pennsylvania, U.S.

Career information
- High school: Upper St. Clair (Upper St. Clair Township, Pennsylvania)
- College: University of Pittsburgh

Douglass G. Whaley (born December 16, 1972) is an American professional football executive and former collegiate player. He is the current general manager of the United Football League, a role he has held under various titles since 2018, and from 2013 to 2017 was the general manager of the Buffalo Bills of the National Football League (NFL).

== Early life ==
Whaley was born in Pittsburgh, where he played high school football and went on to play at the collegiate level. He played college football at Pitt as a defensive back, collecting 4 interceptions during his tenure.

== Career ==
=== Pittsburgh Steelers ===
Whaley worked for the Steelers as a pro personnel coordinator. He worked there for 10 years before accepting the Buffalo Bills job. Whaley worked directly under Kevin Colbert the Director of Football Operations. In his time with the Steelers, Whaley helped scout and draft defensive players such as Lamarr Woodley, Troy Polamalu and Lawrence Timmons.

=== Buffalo Bills ===
Whaley was named assistant general manager and Director of Pro Personnel of the Buffalo Bills on February 10, 2010. Whaley oversaw the team's Pro Personnel department and assisted General Manager Buddy Nix in all football-related administrative duties and in the college talent evaluation process until Nix stepped down from the general manager position on May 13, 2013. Whaley became Buffalo's GM three days later. His most notable moves with Buffalo included trading up to draft receiver Sammy Watkins and trading linebacker Kiko Alonso for All-Pro running back LeSean McCoy. The move to draft Watkins has been questioned, as wide receivers Mike Evans, Odell Beckham Jr., and Brandin Cooks were picked later in the first round.

Whaley was, in conjunction with owners Terry and Kim Pegula and President Russ Brandon, responsible for the hiring of head coach Rex Ryan. After Ryan was relieved of his duties, the team announced that Whaley would lead the search for Ryan's successor, Sean McDermott.

On January 10, 2016, Whaley agreed to a contract extension offered to him by the Bills.

Whaley, alongside his staff, was "relieved of his duties" by the Bills on April 30, 2017, following the 2017 NFL draft. He spent the 2018 season as a recruiter for the NFLPA Collegiate Bowl.

=== XFL and UFL ===
On November 8, 2018, Whaley was hired as the senior vice president of football operations for the revival of the XFL. On April 10, 2020, Whaley was laid off, along with almost every staff member after the league suspended operations due to COVID-19. On November 8, 2021, Whaley was re-hired as the vice president of player personnel of the XFL He retained his office as the XFL merged into the United Football League. In December 2025, with the UFL reorganizing into a centralized front office that eliminates team general managers, Whaley was assigned general manager duties for the entire league.

== Controversies ==
=== E-mail gaffe ===
Whaley gained unwanted notoriety in 2007, when an inappropriate e-mail that he had sent to Steelers assistant coach Larry Zierlein was inadvertently forwarded by Zierlein to a large number of high-level NFL employees, including commissioner Roger Goodell. Zierlein apologized for the gaffe, and it is believed that neither he nor Whaley were disciplined by the team or the league.

=== Radio remark ===
In a May 2016 radio interview, Whaley said of football: "It's a violent game that I personally don't think humans are supposed to play."

=== Release of Fred Jackson ===
Whaley was criticized by fans and players alike for his decision to cut longtime Bills running back and fan favorite Fred Jackson as a "business decision" prior to the 2015 NFL season, especially after allegedly telling Jackson his roster spot was safe. Jackson later reflected on the move prior to retiring with the Bills after Whaley's dismissal, stating that the manner in which he was cut left a "bad taste in his mouth" and that he was dumbfounded by it.

=== Tyrod Taylor benching ===
In December 2016, Whaley refused to explain his decision to bench the Bills' starting quarterback, Tyrod Taylor, prior to the last regular season game. Instead, interim head coach Anthony Lynn was forced to address questions from the media, and in an unscripted response, advised Taylor's benching was a 'business decision'. Whaley did not publicly comment on the decision.

Sporting positions
Preceded by Buddy Nix	Buffalo Bills General Manager; 2013–April 30, 2017	Succeeded by Brandon Beane
Preceded by Charles Bailey	Pittsburgh Steelers Pro Scouting Coordinator; 1999–2009	Succeeded by Brandon Hunt
