= William Gay (cornerback) =

American football player and coach (born 1985)

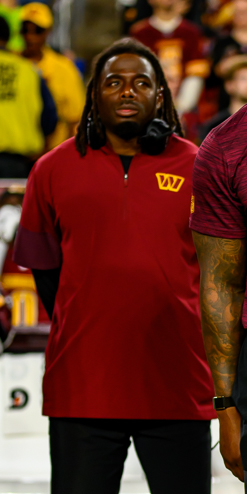
- Gay with the Washington Commanders in 2025

Washington Commanders
- Title: Cornerbacks coach

Personal information
- Born: January 1, 1985 (age 41); Tallahassee, Florida, U.S.
- Listed height: 5 ft 10 in (1.78 m)
- Listed weight: 187 lb (85 kg)

Career information
- Position: Cornerback (No. 22)
- High school: James S. Rickards (Tallahassee)
- College: Louisville (2003–2006)
- NFL draft: 2007: 5th round, 170th overall pick

Career history

Playing
- Pittsburgh Steelers (2007–2011); Arizona Cardinals (2012); Pittsburgh Steelers (2013–2017); New York Giants (2018)*
- * Offseason or practice squad member only

Coaching
- Pittsburgh Steelers (2019) Coaching intern; Missouri State Bears (2020) Defensive backs coach; Washington Commanders (2024–present); Assistant defensive backs coach (2024–2025); Defensive backs/cornerbacks coach (2026–present)

Awards and highlights
- Super Bowl champion (XLIII)

Career NFL statistics
- Tackles: 577
- Sacks: 7
- Forced fumbles: 10
- Pass deflections: 87
- Interceptions: 13
- Touchdowns: 5
- Stats at Pro Football Reference

William Gay (born January 1, 1985) is an American professional football coach and former cornerback who is the cornerbacks coach for the Washington Commanders of the National Football League (NFL). He played college football for the Louisville Cardinals and was selected by the Pittsburgh Steelers in the fifth round of the 2007 NFL draft. Gay was a member of the Super Bowl XLIII-winning team the following season. He played for the Arizona Cardinals and New York Giants before becoming a coach in 2019.

== Early life ==
Gay was born on January 1, 1985, in Tallahassee, Florida. attended James S. Rickards High School in Tallahassee, Florida, where he played quarterback, wide receiver and safety for the Raiders. He racked up over 1,200 all-purpose yards and 12 touchdowns as a junior. He notched 1,035 yards and seven scores passing, 1,237 yards and 11 scores receiving and 82 tackles, 14 pass breakups and nine interceptions at defensive back as a senior when he was named team co-MVP and earned first team All-Big Bend Area honors.

Gay was also a standout in track & field. In 2002, he placed 8th in the 200-meter dash with a time of 22.61 seconds at the Capital City Classic. At the FHSAA Region 3A he took 3rd in the long jump (7.07m or 23 feet, 2 inches) and 14th in the 400-meter dash (51.0 seconds). He was also clocked at 4.4 in the 40-yard dash.

Gay was rated as a three-star prospect by TheInsiders.com and was the nation's 67th-ranked cornerback. He was rated as a three-star prospect and was the nation's 46th-ranked cornerback by Rivals.com.

== College career ==
Gay played college football at the University of Louisville where he played in 46 games recording 134 tackles. Gay is also somewhat notable for being offside as a defender on a field goal kick attempt in the final minute of Louisville's game against Rutgers in 2006. Although the kick was unsuccessful, a penalty was called against Louisville that provided the kicker with a second attempt. This one was successful. As a result, Louisville experienced their only loss of the season, effectively ending their bid for a National Championship game berth.

== Professional career ==
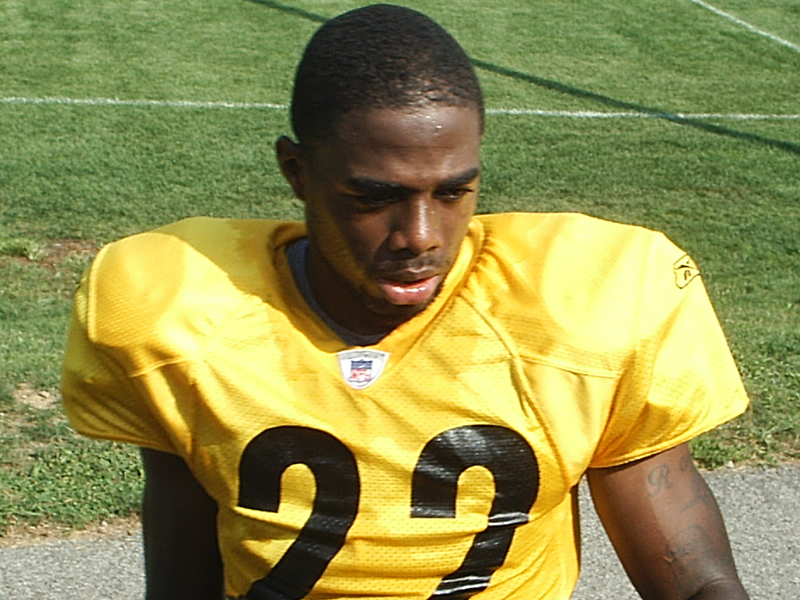
Gay with the Pittsburgh Steelers in 2007

Pre-draft measurables
Height	Weight	40-yard dash	10-yard split	20-yard split	20-yard shuttle	Three-cone drill	Vertical jump	Broad jump	Bench press
5 ft 10 1/8 in (1.78 m)	187 lb (85 kg)	4.48 s	1.51 s	2.55 s	4.15 s	6.89 s	38.5 in (0.98 m)	9 ft 10 in (3.00 m)	16 reps
All values from Pro Day

=== Pittsburgh Steelers (first stint) ===
==== 2007 ====
Gay was selected by the Pittsburgh Steelers in the fifth round (170th overall) in the 2007 NFL draft. On July 22, 2007, the Steelers signed Gay to a three-year, $1.221 million contract. In his first preseason game he intercepted a Tyler Palko pass and tackled Saints first-round draft pick Robert Meachem.

He began his rookie season as the fifth cornerback behind Ike Taylor, Deshea Townsend, Bryant McFadden, and Ricardo Colclough. Gay played his first regular season game in the season opener at Cleveland. In a 34–7 win over the Cleveland Browns, he made his first career tackle and pass deflection. During a Week 7 matchup with the Denver Broncos, he made a season-high 4 tackles. In his rookie year he played in 16 games recording 19 tackles and 2 pass deflections.

==== 2008 ====
In Gay's second year, he saw more significant playing time after injuries to cornerbacks Bryant McFadden and Deshea Townsend. Gay contributed to the Steelers' stingy defense, which was the first in the league in pass defense and best total defense. Gay also contributed on special teams. On November 16, 2008, he received his first career start and made 3 tackles in a game against the San Diego Chargers. On December 14, 2008, Gay made his first career interception and returned it for 12-yards against the Baltimore Ravens.

The Steelers ended Gay's second season 12–4 and finished first amongst the AFC North. On January 18, 2009, Gay played in his first AFC Championship and recorded one tackle, as the Steelers beat the Ravens, 23–14. On February 1, 2009, Gay played in his first Super Bowl and racked up 2 tackles. The Steelers went on to beat the Arizona Cardinals 27–23 to win Super Bowl XLIII.

He finished his second season with 41 tackles, 33 solo tackles, 7 pass deflections, and an interception in 4 starts. Gay also played in every game for the Steelers in 2008.

==== 2009 ====
After Bryant McFadden left via free agency for the Arizona Cardinals during the 2009 off-season, Gay assumed the starting duties at cornerback for the season opposite Ike Taylor. Gay started his first season opener and recorded 4 tackles in the Steelers' 13–10 victory over the Tennessee Titans. He went on to start the next 14 regular season games, as he finished the season with a career-high 78 tackles, 70 solo tackles, a sack, and 10 pass deflections.

==== 2010 ====
On April 16, 2010, he was signed to a one-year, $1.101 million contract by the Steelers. Gay did not start at cornerback until Week 11 against the Oakland Raiders, as Bryant McFadden had re-signed with the Steelers prior to the start of the season. After recording three solo tackles, Gay returned to start the next three games. On January 23, 2011, he started his first career playoff game and recorded two tackles and a 19-yard fumble return for a touchdown in a 24-19 AFC Championship win over the New York Jets. On February 6, 2011, Gay started in his first career Super Bowl. The Steelers went on to lose Super Bowl XLV to the Green Bay Packers with Gay finishing the game with two tackles and a pass deflection.

He finished 2010 with 48 tackles, 40 solo tackles, a career-high 2 sacks, and 11 pass deflections in 16 games and 4 starts.

==== 2011 ====
On August 1, 2011, Gay signed a one-year, $735,000 contract with the Steelers. In his fourth year, Gay started a career-high 15 games. While playing a Week 11 contest at Cincinnati, he recorded 3 tackles and returned an interception for 12-yards in a 24–17 win over the Bengals. On December 5, 2011, he went on to have one of his best games for the Steelers, as he made a season-high seven tackles, five solo tackles, three pass deflections, and an interception in a 14–3 victory over the Cleveland Browns. He finished 2011 with 61 tackles, 49 solo tackles, a career-high 13 pass deflections, and two interceptions.

=== Arizona Cardinals ===
On March 24, 2012, Gay signed a two-year, $3.2 million contract with the Arizona Cardinals. The move reunited him with former Steelers teammate and new Cardinals defensive backs coach Deshea Townsend. On September 9, 2012, Gay made his regular season debut for the Cardinals and accumulated 7 tackles, a pass deflection, and a forced fumble in a win over the Seattle Seahawks. He played his last game for the Cardinals on December 30, 2012, and finished the game with 4 tackles. In his only year in Arizona, he had 57 tackles, 45 solo tackles, a sack, 6 pass deflections, and 2 interceptions. Gay was released on March 1, 2013.

=== Pittsburgh Steelers (second stint) ===
==== 2013 ====
On March 4, 2013, Gay signed a three-year, $4.5 million contract, with the Steelers. It also included a $500,000 signing bonus and $500,000 guaranteed. During a Week 10 game against the Buffalo Bills, Gay had a career-high 11 tackles, a career-high nine solo tackles, and a pass deflection. In a week 12 game against the Cleveland Browns Gay scored his first touchdown on an interception of Brandon Weeden.

==== 2014 ====
Gay began the 2014 season as the third cornerback behind Ike Taylor and Cortez Allen. On September 28, 2014, he received his first start of the season against the Tampa Bay Buccaneers after Taylor broke his forearm the previous game. He finished the loss with four solo tackles and two pass deflections and remained the starter for the rest of the season. On October 26, 2014, Gay made a season-high eight tackles, six solo tackles, and had his second career touchdown when he returned an interception for 33-yards in a 51–34 victory over the Indianapolis Colts. He also gained some spotlight for his unique celebration dance.

While playing at Atlanta on December 14, 2014, Gay had a season-high 8 solo tackles and returned his third interception of the season for a career-high 52-yard touchdown against the Falcons. This gave him the most interceptions returned for touchdowns in the 2014 NFL season and the most in a single season in Steelers history.

He finished the season with 59 combined tackles, 12 pass deflections, three interceptions, and three touchdowns in 16 games and 13 starts.

==== 2015 ====
Following the retirement of longtime teammate Ike Taylor, Gay became the Steelers' number one cornerback for the 2015 season. On December 13, 2015, Gay intercepted Bengals quarterback A. J. McCarron in the third quarter and returned it for a touchdown. This tied him with Pro Football Hall of Famer Rod Woodson for most career interceptions returned for touchdowns for the Pittsburgh Steelers.

In his first season as the Steelers' starting corner, he finished with a total of 58 combined tackles, one sack, seven pass deflections, two interceptions, and one touchdown while starting all 16 regular season games.

==== 2016 ====
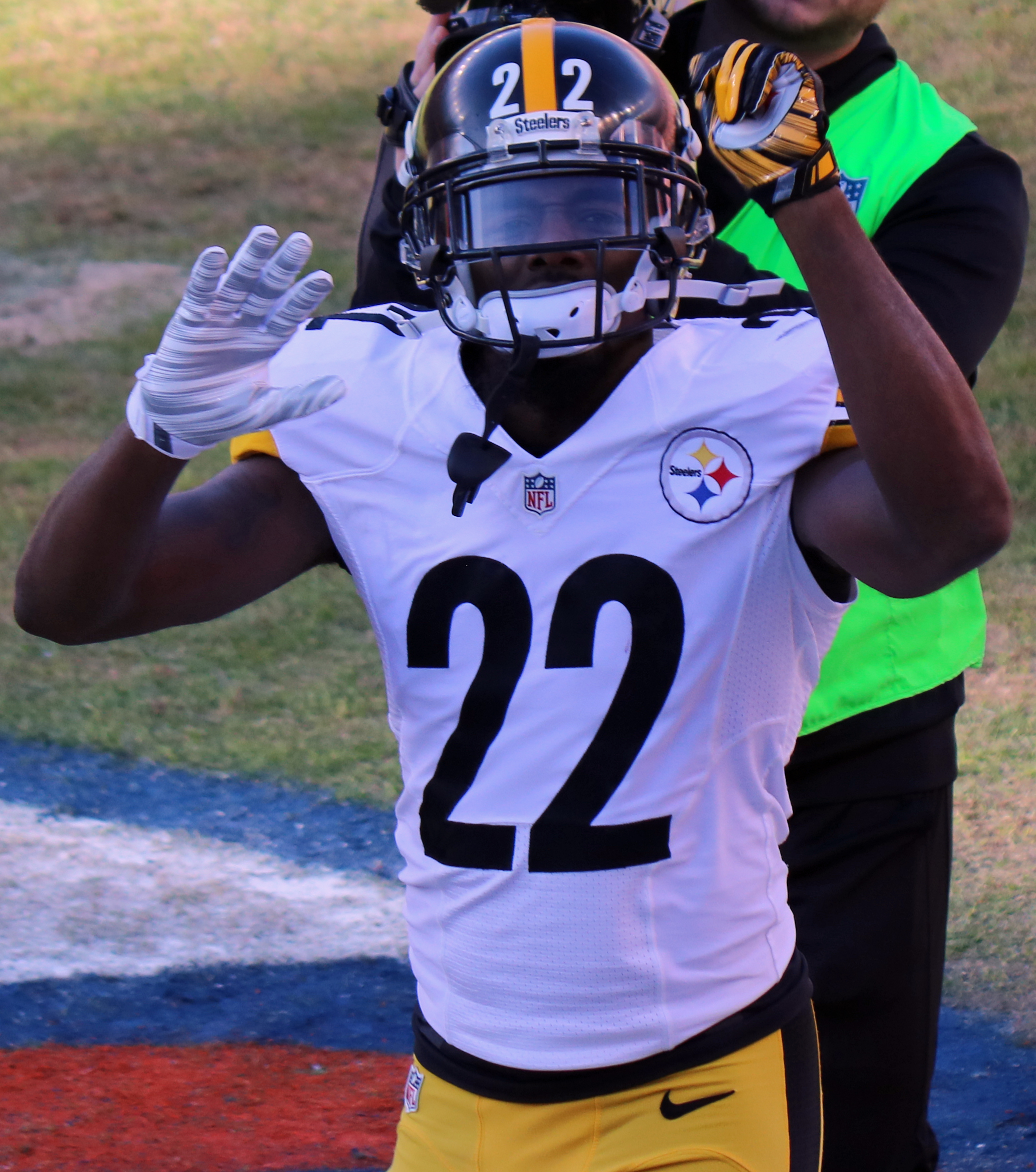
Gay playing for the Steelers in 2016.

Gay began the season as the Steelers starting cornerback. On November 6, 2016, Gay was supplanted as the starter and delegated to the nickel corner with the emergence of Ross Cockrell and rookie Artie Burns.

Gay finished the 2016 season playing in all 16 games, starting nine, and making 42 tackles, one sack, seven passes defended, and an interception. Pro Football Focus gave Gay an overall grade of 83.7, which ranked 15th among all qualifying cornerbacks in 2016. This marked his highest overall grade from PFF during his career.

==== 2017 ====
Gay entered training camp competing with Cockrell, Mike Hilton, and Cameron Sutton for a backup cornerback position. He began the regular season as the fourth cornerback on the depth chart, behind Joe Haden, Burns, and nickel corner Hilton, and was used in primarily dime packages throughout the first five games. In Week 2, against the Minnesota Vikings, Gay forced a fumble by wide receiver Adam Thielen which was recovered by the Steelers in the fourth quarter of their 26–9 victory.

On March 14, 2018, Gay was released by the Steelers.

=== New York Giants ===
On April 5, 2018, Gay was signed by the New York Giants. On September 2, he was released by the Giants.

== NFL career statistics ==
Legend
	Led the league
**Bold**	Career high

=== Regular season ===
Year	Team	Games		Tackles					Interceptions					Fumbles			
Year	Team	GP	GS	Cmb	Solo	Ast	Sck	TFL	Int	Yds	TD	Lng	PD	FF	FR	Yds	TD
2007	PIT	16	0	25	19	6	0.0	1	0	0	0	0	2	0	**1**	0	0
2008	PIT	16	4	41	33	8	0.0	2	1	12	0	12	7	0	0	0	0
2009	PIT	16	14	**78**	**70**	8	1.0	4	0	0	0	0	10	1	0	0	0
2010	PIT	16	4	48	40	8	**2.0**	4	0	0	0	0	11	1	0	0	0
2011	PIT	16	15	61	49	12	0.0	4	2	12	0	12	**13**	0	**1**	**2**	0
2012	ARI	16	15	57	45	12	1.0	4	2	7	0	6	6	**3**	**1**	0	0
2013	PIT	16	11	63	55	8	1.0	4	1	21	1	21	9	2	0	0	0
2014	PIT	16	13	69	58	11	0.0	1	**3**	**113**	**3**	**52**	12	0	0	0	0
2015	PIT	16	**16**	58	46	12	1.0	**7**	2	30	1	23	7	0	0	0	0
2016	PIT	16	9	58	42	**16**	1.0	3	1	0	0	0	7	1	0	0	0
2017	PIT	16	0	19	16	3	0.0	0	1	-1	0	-1	3	2	0	0	0
		176	101	577	473	104	7.0	34	13	194	5	52	87	10	3	2	0

=== Playoffs ===
Year	Team	Games		Tackles					Interceptions					Fumbles			
Year	Team	GP	GS	Cmb	Solo	Ast	Sck	TFL	Int	Yds	TD	Lng	PD	FF	FR	Yds	TD
2007	PIT	1	0	0	0	0	0.0	0	0	0	0	0	0	0	0	0	0
2008	PIT	**3**	0	3	3	0	0.0	0	0	0	0	0	0	0	**1**	0	0
2010	PIT	**3**	**2**	6	5	1	0.0	0	0	0	0	0	**2**	0	**1**	**19**	**1**
2011	PIT	1	1	4	4	0	0.0	0	0	0	0	0	1	0	0	0	0
2014	PIT	1	1	2	2	0	0.0	0	0	0	0	0	1	0	0	0	0
2015	PIT	2	**2**	**13**	**11**	**2**	0.0	**1**	0	0	0	0	1	0	0	0	0
2016	PIT	**3**	1	7	5	**2**	0.0	0	0	0	0	0	1	0	0	0	0
2017	PIT	1	0	0	0	0	0.0	0	0	0	0	0	0	0	0	0	0
		15	7	35	30	5	0.0	1	0	0	0	0	6	0	2	19	1

== Coaching career ==
On June 4, 2019, the Steelers announced the hiring of Gay as a coaching intern for the 2019 season. On January 25, 2020, Gay was named the defensive backs coach for Missouri State, joining the staff of new head coach Bobby Petrino, who was Gay's head coach at Louisville. However, Petrino announced in late September that Gay had resigned, needing to return home to raise his son.

Gay returned to coaching in May 2023, being selected as a participant in NFL's Bill Walsh Diversity Coaching Fellowship, allowing him to participate with the Dallas Cowboys during the 2023 offseason.

On January 20, 2024, it was announced that Gay would be joining the University of Texas coaching staff as a defensive analyst. However, on February 15, 2024, he was hired as assistant defensive backs coach for the Washington Commanders. He was promoted to cornerbacks coach in February 2026.

== Personal life ==
Gay's mother was murdered in a domestic violence incident when he was eight years old. While she was at a friend's house shortly after leaving, her boyfriend arrived at the friend's house and shot her three times. The boyfriend then went back to his car and killed himself. In an effort to keep them together his grandmother took the brothers in and raised them.As of August 2015. Gay was inducted into the Kentucky Pro Football Hall of Fame in 2017. From 2018 to 2020, Gay was engaged to Olympic gold medalist sprinter Natasha Hastings, the cousin of former Trinidad and Tobago international goalkeeper Shaka Hislop; Gay and Hastings have a son together.
