= Ike Taylor =

American football player (born 1980)

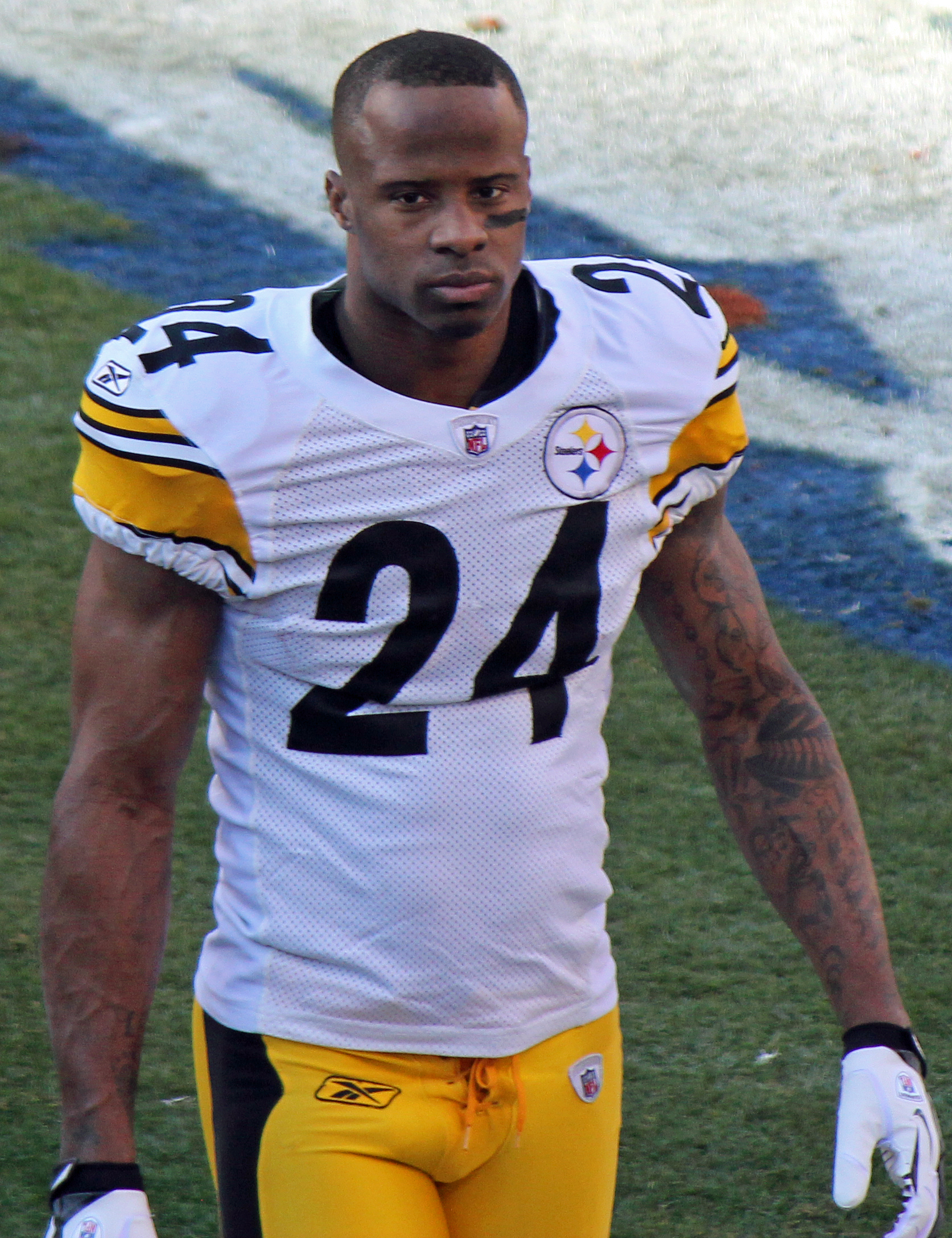
- Taylor with the Pittsburgh Steelers in 2009

No. 24
- Position: Cornerback

Personal information
- Born: May 5, 1980 (age 46); Gretna, Louisiana, U.S.
- Listed height: 6 ft 1 in (1.85 m)
- Listed weight: 195 lb (88 kg)

Career information
- High school: Marion Abramson (New Orleans, Louisiana)
- College: Louisiana–Lafayette (2001–2002)
- NFL draft: 2003: 4th round, 125th overall pick

Career history
- Pittsburgh Steelers (2003–2014)

Awards and highlights
- 2× Super Bowl champion (XL, XLIII)

Career NFL statistics
- Total tackles: 636
- Forced fumbles: 2
- Fumble recoveries: 5
- Pass deflections: 134
- Interceptions: 14
- Defensive touchdowns: 1
- Stats at Pro Football Reference

Ivan "Ike" Taylor (born May 5, 1980) is an American former professional football player who was a cornerback in the National Football League (NFL). He was selected by the Pittsburgh Steelers of the National Football League (NFL) in the fourth round of the 2003 NFL draft, and spent his entire 12-year career in Pittsburgh. He played college football for the Louisiana Ragin' Cajuns.

He was formerly an analyst for NFL Now and other shows on the NFL Network.

== Early life ==
Ike was born in Gretna, Louisiana, which is located just across the Mississippi river from New Orleans. As a child, he moved with his mother, Cora, to Raleigh, North Carolina, but he returned to Louisiana as a seventh-grader to live with his uncle and aunt, Herman and Judy Francois, in Harvey, Louisiana. He attended Marion Abramson Senior High School in New Orleans where he played football and basketball. In high school, he played running back, defensive end, cornerback and placekicker.

== College career ==
Taylor attended college at University of Louisiana at Lafayette where he majored in psychology, but he was academically ineligible to play football his first two years. He joined the football team as a walk on in 2001, earning a scholarship prior to the season. In his first season, he played tailback and special teams and returned kicks.

Prior to his senior season, Taylor asked to be moved to cornerback. He started the season at the right cornerback spot and recorded 46 tackles, eight passes defensed and two forced fumbles. In four games, he did not allow an opponent to catch a ball. Among his college teammates was Charles Tillman who was selected by the Chicago Bears.

== Professional career ==
Pre-draft measurables
Height	Weight
6 ft 0 3/8 in (1.84 m)	202 lb (92 kg)
Values from Pro Day

=== 2003 ===
The Pittsburgh Steelers selected Taylor in the fourth round (125th overall) in the 2003 NFL draft. His selection was made despite his inexperience and lack of consistent play and was based primarily on Taylor's rare combination of size and speed. Leading up to the draft, he was timed allegedly as fast as 4.18 seconds in the 40-yard dash at his pro day., However, most NFL coaches and general managers still failed to see his potential. At the time of the selection, Pittsburgh Post-Gazette writer Mark Madden claimed Taylor was the worst pick in history.

On May 28, 2003, the Steelers signed Taylor to a three-year, $1.18 million contract that included a signing bonus of $275,000.

Throughout training camp, he competed against Chidi Iwuoma to be the fourth cornerback on the depth chart. Head coach Bill Cowher named Taylor the fourth cornerback on the depth chart to begin the regular season, behind Chad Scott, Dewayne Washington, and Deshea Townsend. He was also given kick return duties by special teams coordinator Kevin Spencer.

He made his professional regular season debut in the Pittsburgh Steelers' season-opener against the Baltimore Ravens and recorded two combined tackles in their 34–15 victory. Taylor also returned two kicks for 29-yards. In Week 8, he returned six kicks for a season-high 145-yards during a 33–21 loss against the St. Louis Rams. On November 23, 2003, Taylor earned his first career start at nickelback and recorded four combined tackles in the Steelers' 13–6 victory at the Cleveland Browns in Week 12. He remained at nickelback for the remainder of the season after Chad Scott was placed on injured reserve due to a torn flexor tendon in his right hand. He completed his rookie season in 2003 with 32 combined tackles (26 solo) and three pass deflections in 16 games and one start. Taylor also had 37 kick returns for 831-yards (22.46 YPR).

=== 2004 ===
During training camp, Taylor competed for a role as a backup cornerback against Ricardo Colclough, Terry Fair, Chidi Iwuoma, and Shane Walton. Head coach Bill Cowher named Taylor the fifth cornerback on the depth chart to start the 2004 season, behind Deshea Townsend, Chad Scott, Willie Williams, and Ricardo Colclough.

On October 3, 2004, Taylor recorded a tackle and made his first career interception off a pass by Carson Palmer during a 28–17 victory against the Cincinnati Bengals in Week 4. In Week 7, Taylor was promoted to being the fourth cornerback on the depth chart after Chad Scott sustained a slight tear to his quadriceps the previous week and was sidelined for the next nine games (Weeks 8–16). The following week, Taylor made two combined tackles, a pass deflection, and intercepted a pass by Tom Brady in the Steelers' 34–20 victory against the New England Patriots in Week 8. Taylor finished his second season with 16 combined tackles (ten solo), four pass deflections, and an interception in 13 games and one start. He also had 12 kick returns for 184-yards.

The Pittsburgh Steelers finished first in the AFC North with a 15–1 record after rookie quarterback Ben Roethlisberger became the starter and went 13–0 to end the season. On January 15, 2005, Taylor appeared in his first career playoff game and made one tackle in the Steelers' 20–17 victory against the New York Jets in the AFC Divisional Round. The Pittsburgh Steelers were eliminated the following week after losing 41–27 to the New England Patriots who went on to win Super Bowl XXXIX.

=== 2005 ===
In 2005, Taylor competed for a job as a starting cornerback against Chad Scott, Willie Williams, Ricardo Colclough, and Bryant McFadden. Defensive coordinator Dick LeBeau named Taylor the starting cornerback to begin the regular season, alongside Deshea Townsend.

He started in the Pittsburgh Steelers' season-opener against the Tennessee Titans and recorded nine combined tackles and two pass deflections in their 34–7 victory. In Week 3, he collected a season-high 15 combined tackles (11 solo) and broke up a pass during a 23–20 loss to the New England Patriots. On October 31, 2005, Taylor recorded ten combined tackles (nine solo), a pass deflection, and intercepted a pass by Kyle Boller in the Steelers' 20–19 win against the Baltimore Ravens in Week 8. He finished the 2005 season with a career-high 91 combined tackles (75 solo), a career-high 23 pass deflections, and an interception in 16 games and 15 starts.

The Pittsburgh Steelers finished second in the AFC North with an 11–5 record. On January 8, 2006, Taylor started his first career playoff game and recorded three solo tackles and deflected two passes during the Steelers' 31–17 victory at the Cincinnati Bengals in the AFC Wildcard Game. The following week, they defeated the Indianapolis Colts 21–18 in the AFC Divisional Round. On January 22, 2006, Taylor recorded a tackle, a pass deflection, and an interception during a 34–17 victory at the Denver Broncos in the AFC Championship Game. On February 5, 2006, Taylor started in Super Bowl XL and led the Steelers with seven combined tackles, two pass deflections, and intercepted a pass by Matt Hasselbeck in the red zone as the Steelers defeated the Seattle Seahawks 21–10.

=== 2006 ===
On September 3, 2006, the Pittsburgh Steelers signed Taylor to a four-year, $22.5 million contract that included a signing bonus of $6.4 million. The contract made Taylor the highest paid cornerback in franchise history and would tie him to the Steelers through 2010.

Taylor entered training camp slated as a starting cornerback and was officially named a starter to begin the season, along with Deshea Townsend. He started the Pittsburgh Steelers' season-opener against the Miami Dolphins and recorded six combined tackles and a career-high seven pass deflections in their 28–7 victory. In Week 3, he made four combined tackles, a pass deflection, and an interception during a 28–20 loss to the Cincinnati Bengals. On October 8, 2006, Taylor made a season-high eight solo tackles and two pass deflections in the Steelers' 23–13 loss at the San Diego Chargers in Week 5. On November 5, 2006, Taylor was benched in favor for Bryant McFadden after giving up six receptions for 134-yards and two touchdowns to wide receiver Javon Walker during a 31–20 loss to the Denver Broncos in Week 9. Prior to his benching, Taylor routinely covered the opponent's top receiver man-to-man. He finished the game as their fourth cornerback and recorded six solo tackles and three pass deflections. Head coach Bill Cowher officially demoted Taylor to being the third cornerback on the depth chart in favor of Bryant McFadden in Week 12. He finished the season with 69 combined tackles (60 solo), 15 pass deflections, and two interceptions in 16 games and 11 starts.

=== 2007 ===
Head coach Mike Tomlin named Taylor and Deshea Townsend to starting cornerbacks to begin the regular season. He started in the Pittsburgh Steelers' season-opener at the Cleveland Browns and recorded five solo tackles, a pass deflection, an interception, and made his first career sack in their 34–7 victory. He sacked quarterback Charlie Frye for a ten-yard loss in the second quarter. On October 7, 2007, Taylor made five combined tackles, a season-high four pass deflections, and an interception in the Steelers' 21–0 victory against the Seattle Seahawks in Week 5. He was voted NFL Defensive Player of the Week for his performance. In Week 16, Taylor recorded five solo tackles, three pass deflections, and returned an interception for his first career touchdown during a 41–24 victory at the St. Louis Rams. He intercepted a pass by Marc Bulger in the fourth quarter and returned it 51-yards for a touchdown. The following week, he collected a season-high nine solo tackles in the Steelers' 27–21 loss at the Baltimore Ravens in Week 17. Taylor completed the 2007 season with 80 combined tackles (69 solo), 16 pass deflections, three interceptions, a sack, and a touchdown in 16 games and 16 starts.

The Pittsburgh Steelers finished first in the AFC North with a 10–6 record. On January 5, 2008, Taylor made three combined tackles, a pass deflection, and an interception during a 31–29 loss to the Jacksonville Jaguars in the AFC Wildcard Game. His interception marked his third consecutive playoff game with a pick.

=== 2008 ===
Defensive coordinator Dick LeBeau retained Taylor and Townsend as the starting cornerbacks to begin the 2008 regular season. On October 26, 2008, Taylor started as the No. 1 cornerback for the first time since being demoted in 2006. Defensive coordinator Dick LeBeau opted to have Taylor play one-on-one man coverage and shadow the Giants' No. 1 wide receiver, Plaxico Burress. Taylor held Burress to three receptions for 15-yards and also made three solo tackles and two pass deflections during their 21–14 loss against the New York Giants in Week 8. The following week, he held wide receiver Santana Moss to 14-yards on two catches and also recorded three combined tackles and two pass deflections in a 23–6 victory at the Washington Redskins in Week 9. In Week 14, he made three combined tackles, a pass deflection, and an interception during a 20–13 victory against the Dallas Cowboys. On December 21, 2008, Taylor collected a season-high seven combined tackles and broke up a pass in the Steelers' 31–14 loss at the Tennessee Titans in Week 16. He finished the season with 65 combined tackles (50 solo), 14 pass deflections, and an interception in 16 games and 16 starts.

The Pittsburgh Steelers finished first in the AFC North with a 12–4 record, clinching a first round bye. They reached the Super Bowl after defeating the San Diego Chargers 35–24 in the AFC Divisional Round and the Baltimore Ravens 23–14 in the AFC Championship Game. On February 1, 2009, Taylor started in Super Bowl XLIII and recorded eight combined tackles during the Steelers' 27–23 victory against the Arizona Cardinals.

=== 2009 ===
Head coach Mike Tomlin named Taylor a starting cornerback to begin the regular season, along with William Gay. In Week 7, Taylor collected a season-high ten combined tackles (seven solo) during a 27–17 victory against the Minnesota Vikings. On January 3, 2010, Taylor made four combined tackles, a pass deflection, and intercepted a pass during a 39–24 victory at the Miami Dolphins in Week 17. During the game, Taylor made a helmet-to-helmet hit on Miami Dolphins quarterback Pat White which rendered White unconscious. White was carted off the field, but did not appear to sustain any long-term damage from the hit. He finished the 2009 season with 62 combined tackles (53 solo), 13 pass deflections, a sack, and an interception in 16 games and 16 starts.

=== 2010 ===
Taylor entered training camp slated as the No. 1 cornerback after the Steelers chose not to re-sign Deshea Townsend. Head coach Mike Tomlin officially named him the starter to begin the regular season, alongside Bryant McFadden and nickelback William Gay.

He started in the Pittsburgh Steelers' season-opener against the Atlanta Falcons and recorded a season-high seven combined tackles and a pass deflection in their 15–9 victory. The following week, he tied his season-high of seven combined tackles during a 19–12 victory at the Tennessee Titans in Week 2. On December 5, 2010, Taylor collected three combined tackles, broke up a pass, and sacked quarterback Joe Flacco in the Steelers' 13–10 win at the Baltimore Ravens in Week 13. The sack became the third sack of his career. He finished the season with 66 combined tackles (52 solo), 11 pass deflections, two interceptions, and a sack in 16 games and 16 starts.

The Steelers finished atop The AFC North with a 12–4 record, clinching a first round bye and home-field advantage. The Steelers reached the Super Bowl after defeating the Baltimore Ravens 31–24 in the AFC Divisional Round and won the AFC Championship during a 24–19 win against the New York Jets. On February 2, 2011, Taylor started in Super Bowl XLV and recorded four combined tackles as the Steelers were defeated by the Green Bay Packers 31–25.

=== 2011 ===
On July 29, 2011, the Steelers signed Taylor to a four-year, $28 million contract with $15.15 million guaranteed. Defensive coordinator Dick LeBeau retained McFadden and Taylor as the Steelers' starting cornerbacks to begin the regular season 2011. On November 27, 2011, Taylor recorded four combined tackles, two pass deflections, and intercepted a pass attempt by quarterback Tyler Palko in the Steelers' 13–9 victory at the Kansas City Chiefs in Week 12. The following week, he collected a season-high seven combined tackles, three pass deflections, and an interception during a 35–7 win against the Cincinnati Bengals in Week 13. Taylor completed the 2011 season with 44 combined tackles (34 solo), 14 pass deflections, and two interceptions in 16 games and 16 starts.

The Pittsburgh Steelers finished second in the AFC North with a 12–4 record in 2011 and earned a wildcard berth. On January 8, 2012, Taylor started in the AFC Wildcard game at the Denver Broncos and recorded seven combined tackles. At the end of regulation, the Broncos and Steelers were tied 23–23 and went into overtime where the Broncos received possession after winning the coin toss. On the first play in overtime, Taylor was beat on a post route by Demaryius Thomas and gave up an 80-yard touchdown pass by quarterback Tim Tebow.

=== 2012 ===
On February 10, 2012, the Steelers restructured Taylor's contract in order to free up salary cap space and converted $4.95 million of his base salary into a signing bonus. The maneuver freed up $3.28 million in cap space in future seasons.

Taylor entered training camp entrenched as the No. 1 starting cornerback. Head coach Mike Tomlin officially named him the starter to begin the regular season, opposite Keenan Lewis. On November 4, 2012, Taylor recorded a season-high seven combined tackles, a pass deflection, and intercepted a pass by Eli Manning during a 24–20 victory at the New York Giants in Week 9. On December 2, 2012, Taylor injured his fibula during a 23–20 victory at the Baltimore Ravens in Week 12. His injury sidelined him for five games (Weeks 13–17) and also ended his eight-year, 136-game streak that extended back to 2004. He finished with 32 combined tackles (25 solo), 13 pass deflections, and an interception in 12 games and 12 starts.

=== 2013 ===
Head coach Mike Tomlin retained Taylor as a starting cornerback to begin the season, along with Cortez Allen. On September 16, 2013, Taylor recorded a season-high six solo tackles and broke up a pass during a 20–10 loss at the Cincinnati Bengals in Week 2. In Week 15, he collected a season-high seven combined tackles and two pass deflections in the Steelers' 30–20 victory at the Cincinnati Bengals. Taylor finished the 2013 season with 63 combined tackles (52 solo) and 12 pass deflections in 16 games and 16 starts.

=== 2014 ===
Defensive coordinator Dick LeBeau retained Taylor and Allen as the starting cornerback duo in 2014. On September 21, 2014, Taylor broke his right forearm during a 37–19 victory at the Carolina Panthers in Week 3. The injury occurred while Taylor was attempting to tackle wide receiver Kelvin Benjamin after a five-yard reception in the third quarter. While bringing Benjamin down, teammate Lawrence Timmons delivered a blow and made direct contact with Taylor's arm. His forearm was visibly broken and he was inactive for the next eight games (Weeks 4–11). On December 7, 2014, Taylor recorded a season-high seven combined tackles during a 42–21 victory at the Cincinnati Bengals in Week 14. He was inactive for the last three games of the regular season (Weeks 15–17) after sustaining a shoulder injury. He completed the 2014 season with 16 combined tackles (11 solo) and two pass deflections in five games and five starts.

On April 14, 2015, Taylor announced his retirement.

== NFL career statistics ==
Legend
**Bold**	Career high

Year	Team	Games		Tackles					Interceptions						Fumbles			
Year	Team	GP	GS	Comb	Solo	Ast	Sack	Sfty	PD	Int	Yds	Avg	Lng	TD	FF	FR	Yds	TD
2003	PIT	16	1	32	26	6	0.0	0	2	0	0	0.0	0	0	0	0	0	0
2004	PIT	13	1	16	10	6	0.0	0	4	1	0	0.0	0	0	0	0	0	0
2005	PIT	16	15	**91**	**75**	**16**	0.0	0	**20**	1	0	0.0	0	0	0	**2**	**8**	0
2006	PIT	16	11	69	61	8	0.0	0	12	2	34	17.0	34	0	0	1	0	0
2007	PIT	16	16	80	69	11	**1.0**	0	16	**3**	**56**	18.7	**51**	**1**	**1**	1	0	0
2008	PIT	16	16	65	50	15	0.0	0	15	1	0	0.0	0	0	0	0	0	0
2009	PIT	16	16	62	53	9	**1.0**	0	13	1	20	**20.0**	20	0	0	1	1	0
2010	PIT	16	15	66	52	14	**1.0**	0	11	2	9	4.5	9	0	**1**	0	0	0
2011	PIT	16	16	44	34	10	0.0	0	14	2	29	14.5	29	0	0	0	0	0
2012	PIT	12	12	32	25	7	0.0	0	13	1	3	3.0	3	0	0	0	0	0
2013	PIT	16	16	63	52	11	0.0	0	12	0	0	0.0	0	0	0	0	0	0
2014	PIT	5	5	16	11	5	0.0	0	2	0	0	0.0	0	0	0	0	0	0
Career		174	140	636	518	118	3.0	0	134	14	151	10.8	51	1	2	5	9	0

== NFL Network ==
On August 13, 2015, he was added to NFL Network as an analyst for NFL Media, appearing primarily on NFL Now as well as NFL Network shows such as The Top 100 Players. On December 12, 2017, he, along with Marshall Faulk and Heath Evans, was suspended from the NFL Network after sexual harassment accusations against them were made.

== Personal life ==
Taylor makes his off-season home in his native New Orleans. He trains with Tom Shaw in his Speed, Power, Agility, Reaction and Quickness (SPARQ) Training Program, primarily at Disney's Wide World of Sports Complex in Orlando, Florida.

Each summer since 2005 Taylor has run the FaceMeIke Football Camp in New Orleans for local youth.

Ike's son, Ivan Taylor, plays college football for The University of Alabama.
