= Brandon Hunt =

American football executive

Las Vegas Raiders
- Title: Vice President of player personnel

Personal information
- Born: Los Angeles, California, U.S.

Career information
- High school: Pine-Richland
- College: IUP

Career history

Coaching
- Indiana University of Pennsylvania (2004) Graduate assistant

Operations
- Pittsburgh Steelers (2005–2006) Front office intern; Houston Texans (2007–2009) Pro scout; Pittsburgh Steelers (2009–2022) Pro scouting coordinator; Philadelphia Eagles (2022–2023); Director of scouting (2022-2023); Senior director of scouting (2024); Las Vegas Raiders (2025–present) Vice President of player personnel

Awards and highlights
- 2× Super Bowl champion (XL, LIX)

Brandon Hunt is an American football executive who currently serves as the vice president of player personnel for the Las Vegas Raiders of the National Football League (NFL). Prior to serving with the Raiders, Hunt served with the Pittsburgh Steelers, Houston Texans, and Philadelphia Eagles, with whom he won Super Bowl LIX.

== Early life ==
Hunt was born in Los Angeles but was raised in Pittsburgh and attended Pine-Richland High School. He also attended Indiana University of Pennsylvania where he was also a graduate assistant.

== Front office career ==
=== Pittsburgh Steelers (2005–06) ===
After serving at IUP as a graduate assistant for a year, Hunt joined the Pittsburgh Steelers organization as an Intern.

=== Houston Texans (2007–2009) ===
After Hunt's internship, the Houston Texans hired him as pro scout.

=== Second stint with Steelers (2009–2022) ===
Hunt was promoted and left for the Pittsburgh Steelers to serve as the team's pro scouting coordinator. He served in the position for more than a decade under Kevin Colbert, where he was very influential.

=== Philadelphia Eagles (2022–2025) ===
After Steelers' General Manager Kevin Colbert resigned and Omar Khan was selected as his replacement instead of Hunt, Hunt joined the Philadelphia Eagles under Howie Roseman to serve as director of scouting. On June 9, 2024, Hunt was promoted to the role of senior director of scouting. He won a Super Bowl championship when the Eagles defeated the Kansas City Chiefs 40–22 in Super Bowl LIX.

=== Las Vegas Raiders (2025–present) ===
On May 15, 2025, the Las Vegas Raiders hired Hunt to serve as the team's vice president of player personnel.

== Personal life ==
Hunt is married and has two sons. They live in Las Vegas.
