= Bryant McFadden =

American football player (born 1981)

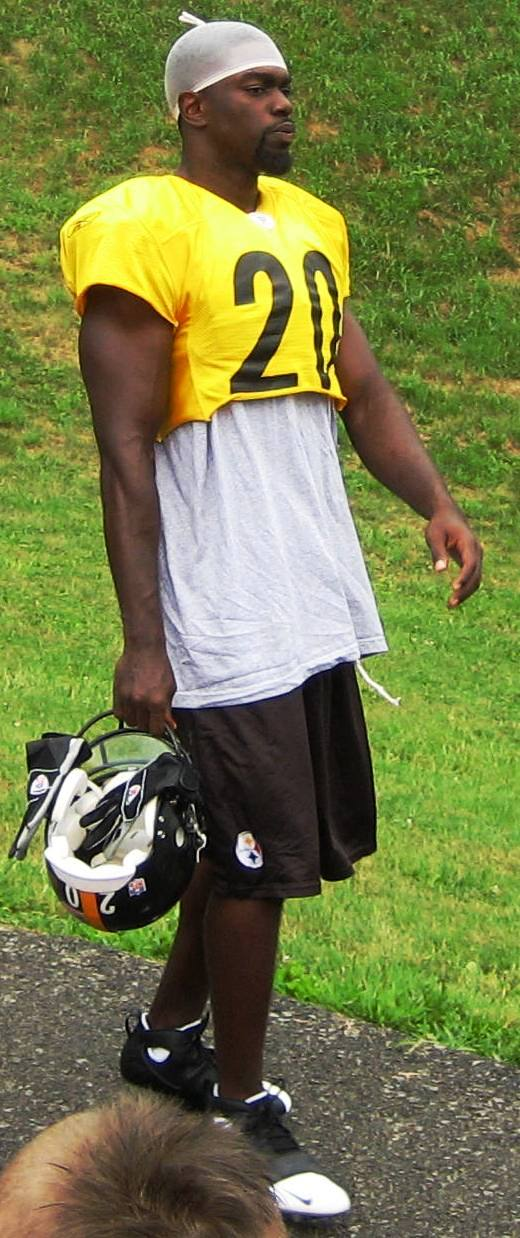
- McFadden with the Pittsburgh Steelers in 2007

No. 20, 25
- Position: Cornerback

Personal information
- Born: November 21, 1981 (age 44); Hollywood, Florida, U.S.
- Listed height: 6 ft 0 in (1.83 m)
- Listed weight: 190 lb (86 kg)

Career information
- High school: McArthur (Hollywood)
- College: Florida State
- NFL draft: 2005: 2nd round, 62nd overall pick

Career history
- Pittsburgh Steelers (2005–2008); Arizona Cardinals (2009); Pittsburgh Steelers (2010–2011)

Awards and highlights
- 2× Super Bowl champion (XL, XLIII); Second-team All-ACC (2004)

Career NFL statistics
- Total tackles: 303
- Sacks: 4
- Forced fumbles: 4
- Fumble recoveries: 7
- Interceptions: 9
- Defensive touchdowns: 1
- Stats at Pro Football Reference

Bryant McFadden (born November 21, 1981) is an American former professional football player who was a cornerback in the National Football League (NFL). He played college football for the Florida State Seminoles and was selected by the Pittsburgh Steelers in the second round of the 2005 NFL draft. McFadden was also a member of the Arizona Cardinals. He earned two Super Bowl rings during his time with the Steelers, Super Bowl XL and Super Bowl XLIII. McFadden currently serves as a studio analyst for the all-digital sports network, 120 Sports. He also hosts Huddlecast, the football podcast of his alma mater, Florida State University, and co-hosts All Things Covered, a podcast with former NFL cornerback Patrick Peterson.

== Early life ==
Bryant McFadden attended McArthur High School in Hollywood, Florida. He was ranked the top cornerback by most recruiting services. As a senior, he was a USA Today All-USA selection, a Parade All-America first-team selection, and named to the Super Southern 100 team by The Atlanta Journal-Constitution, after posting two interceptions and 75 tackles. As a junior, he posted one interception and 75 tackles.

== College career ==
McFadden played college football at Florida State University where he finished his career with 107 tackles. He played cornerback at FSU. He majored in computer graphics, with a minor in studio art.

== Professional career ==
Pre-draft measurables
Height	Weight	Arm length	Hand span	40-yard dash	20-yard shuttle	Vertical jump	Broad jump	Bench press
5 ft 11 3/4 in (1.82 m)	193 lb (88 kg)	31 1/8 in (0.79 m)	9 1/4 in (0.23 m)	4.44 s	4.04 s	39.5 in (1.00 m)	11 ft 3 in (3.43 m)	23 reps

=== Pittsburgh Steelers (first stint) ===
Bryant was selected 62nd overall in the 2005 NFL draft, as a nickel back. He recorded his first career interception against Jacksonville in Week 5.

Filling in at the starting position for the injured Deshea Townsend, McFadden intercepted a Byron Leftwich pass in the Steelers' end zone. The interception led to a game-tying Jeff Reed 29-yard field goal. The Steelers ended up losing, 23–17.

Bryant is also well known among Steelers fans for his two big plays in the AFC Divisional Playoffs against the Indianapolis Colts. After Jerome Bettis's crucial fumble at the goal line, Colts' quarterback Peyton Manning threw to the end zone for wide receiver Reggie Wayne. Bryant tipped the ball away at the last second. On the next play, Manning again went deep for Wayne, and McFadden tipped it away again. Mike Vanderjagt then missed a game-tying field goal.

He finished his debut season with 18 tackles, one interception and a victory at Super Bowl XL.

In the third game of the 2007 season against the San Francisco 49ers, he intercepted the ball and ran it back for a touchdown. He ended the campaign with 22 tackles and one interception.

=== Arizona Cardinals ===
An unrestricted free agent in the 2009 offseason, McFadden signed a two-year, $10 million contract with the Arizona Cardinals, the team the Steelers had just beaten in Super Bowl XLIII. McFadden finished the season with 69 tackles.

=== Pittsburgh Steelers (second stint) ===
McFadden, along with Arizona's sixth round draft pick, was traded back to the Steelers during the 2010 NFL draft, in exchange for the Steelers' second fifth round draft pick.

At the end of the 2010 season, McFadden and the Steelers appeared in Super Bowl XLV against the Green Bay Packers. He started and recorded four total tackles in the 31–25 loss.

He played two seasons with the Steelers, with 91 tackles in 29 games, and was released on February 8, 2012.

== NFL career statistics ==
Legend
**Bold**	Career high

=== Regular season ===
Year	Team	Games		Tackles					Interceptions					Fumbles			
Year	Team	GP	GS	Cmb	Solo	Ast	Sck	TFL	Int	Yds	TD	Lng	PD	FF	FR	Yds	TD
2005	PIT	12	1	21	20	1	1.0	**1**	1	0	0	0	7	1	1	**9**	0
2006	PIT	**16**	9	54	47	**7**	0.0	0	**3**	39	0	39	12	0	**3**	0	0
2007	PIT	13	0	27	23	4	0.0	**1**	1	**50**	**1**	**50**	3	0	1	0	0
2008	PIT	10	8	41	37	4	1.0	**1**	2	0	0	0	8	0	1	0	0
2009	ARI	**16**	**16**	69	64	5	0.0	**1**	0	0	0	0	**15**	0	1	7	0
2010	PIT	**16**	**16**	**81**	**74**	**7**	**2.0**	**1**	2	-3	0	0	10	**2**	0	0	0
2011	PIT	13	1	10	7	3	0.0	0	0	0	0	0	1	1	0	0	0
		96	51	303	272	31	4.0	5	9	86	1	50	56	4	7	16	0

=== Playoffs ===
Year	Team	Games		Tackles					Interceptions					Fumbles			
Year	Team	GP	GS	Cmb	Solo	Ast	Sck	TFL	Int	Yds	TD	Lng	PD	FF	FR	Yds	TD
2005	PIT	**4**	0	8	8	0	0.0	0	0	0	0	0	**3**	0	0	0	0
2007	PIT	1	0	1	1	0	0.0	0	0	0	0	0	0	0	0	0	0
2008	PIT	3	**3**	4	4	0	0.0	0	0	0	0	0	1	0	0	0	0
2009	ARI	2	2	**9**	**9**	0	0.0	0	0	0	0	0	0	0	0	0	0
2010	PIT	3	2	4	4	0	0.0	0	0	0	0	0	0	0	0	0	0
2011	PIT	1	0	0	0	0	0.0	0	0	0	0	0	0	0	0	0	0
		14	7	26	26	0	0.0	0	0	0	0	0	4	0	0	0	0

== Broadcasting career ==
While still a player, for three seasons, McFadden hosted his own 30-minute weekly TV show on WPMY, "The Hometowne Sports B-Mac Corner." He also hosted a weekly radio show on Pittsburgh's WEAE-FM, now known as WPGP, in 2011–12.

Following his playing career, McFadden joined the team at 120 Sports, an all-digital sports network based out of Chicago, where he served as a studio analyst.

In addition to his work on 120 Sports, McFadden has worked as a game analyst for the 2015 Southern Heritage Classic on Fox Sports South, and been a regular guest on radio shows across the country, including national broadcasts on ESPN Radio and Sirius/XM.

In 2018, McFadden joined CBS Sports HQ appearing regularly during the NFL season as an analyst for their weekly football shows.

McFadden joins several of his Steelers' teammates who have moved into broadcasting after their playing careers, including Jerome Bettis, Ryan Clark, Ike Taylor and Hines Ward.
