= Kevin Colbert =

American football executive and player (born 1957)

Colorado State Rams
- Position: Consultant

Personal information
- Born: January 1957 (age 69); Pittsburgh, Pennsylvania, U.S.

Career information
- High school: North Catholic (Cranberry Township, Pennsylvania)
- College: Robert Morris

Career history
- BLESTO Scout (1984); Miami Dolphins (1985–1989); College scout; Detroit Lions (1990–1999); Pro scouting director; Pittsburgh Steelers (2000–2010); Director of football operations; Pittsburgh Steelers (2010–2016); General manager; Pittsburgh Steelers (2016–2022); Vice president & general manager; Colorado State (2025–present); Consultant

Awards and highlights
- 2× Super Bowl champion (XL, XLIII); Pittsburgh Steelers Hall of Honor
- Executive profile at Pro Football Reference

Kevin Colbert (/ˈkoʊlbərt/; born January 1957) is an American professional football executive who serves a consultant for Colorado State. He served as the general manager of Pittsburgh Steelers from 2000 to 2021. Colbert is widely credited with putting together the Super Bowl XL and the Super Bowl XLIII teams in Pittsburgh along with owner Dan Rooney, president Art Rooney II, and coaches Bill Cowher and Mike Tomlin.

== Early life and career ==
A Pittsburgh native, Colbert grew up not far from Three Rivers Stadium on the city's North Side and attended North Catholic High School and Robert Morris University. Colbert has experience in coaching and managing teams in baseball and basketball alongside his primary sport, football. After graduating from Robert Morris University in 1979, he served as a graduate assistant coach on Robert Morris's basketball team from 1979 to 1981 and also was the head coach of the baseball team in 1981. In 1981, Colbert moved to Ohio Wesleyan University to be their backfield coach and recruiting coordinator from 1981 to 1983, and served as the school's head baseball coach in 1984.

In 1984, Colbert joined the BLESTO Scouting Organization and from there was hired by the Miami Dolphins as a college scout from 1985 to 1989. Colbert joined the Detroit Lions as the Pro Scouting Director in 1990, where he was responsible for scouting players at the pro level (the NFL, the NFL Europe League, and the Canadian Football League) as well as assisting with college player evaluation. He joined the Pittsburgh Steelers in 2000 as the director of football operations, assisting in the assembly of two Super Bowl winning teams. In 2010, Colbert was named the Steelers' first ever general manager and was placed in charge of player transactions and acquisitions as the head executive in the Steelers organization.

On January 28, 2022, it was announced that Colbert would step down as the Steelers’ general manager following the 2022 NFL draft. The transaction became official on May 1 after the draft concluded.

On January 30, 2025 it was announced that Colbert would be joining Colorado State University as a consultant in the newly formed front office.

== Personal life ==
Colbert and his wife Janis reside in Gibsonia, Pennsylvania, a suburb of Pittsburgh, and have three children: Kacie, Jennifer, and Daniel as well as two grandchildren, Avery and Brock.
