= 2015 Pittsburgh Steelers season =

Steelers 2015 sports season

- Owner: The Rooney Family
- General manager: Kevin Colbert
- Head coach: Mike Tomlin
- Offensive coordinator: Todd Haley
- Defensive coordinator: Keith Butler
- Home stadium: Heinz Field

Results
- Record: 10–6
- Division place: 2nd AFC North
- Playoffs: Won Wild Card Playoffs (at Bengals) 18–16; Lost Divisional Playoffs (at Broncos) 16–23
- Pro Bowlers: Antonio Brown, WR; David DeCastro, G Ben Roethlisberger, QB
- Team MVP: Antonio Brown
- Team ROY: Bud Dupree

Uniform
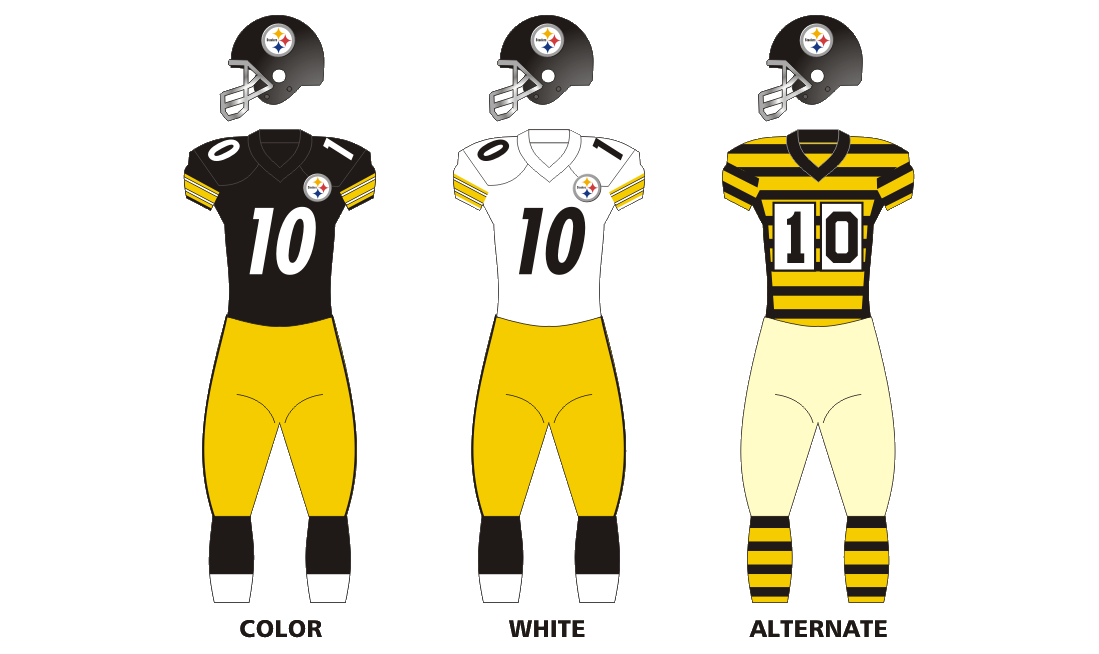

The 2015 season was the Pittsburgh Steelers' 83rd in the National Football League (NFL), their 16th under general manager Kevin Colbert and their ninth under head coach Mike Tomlin. For the first time since 2002, safety Troy Polamalu was not on the opening day roster, as he announced his retirement on April 9.

The Steelers clinched the last AFC playoff spot, finishing tied with the New York Jets with a 10–6 record, but winning the tiebreaker over the Jets based on a better record vs. common opponents. The Steelers defeated the Cincinnati Bengals in the Wild Card round, but lost to the eventual Super Bowl champion Denver Broncos in the Divisional round.

== 2015 draft class ==
2015 Pittsburgh Steelers draft
Round	Pick	Player	Position	College	Notes
1	22	Bud Dupree	Outside linebacker	Kentucky	Team Rookie of the Year
2	56	Senquez Golson	Cornerback	Ole Miss	
3	87	Sammie Coates	Wide receiver	Auburn	
4	121	Doran Grant	Cornerback	Ohio State	
5	160	Jesse James	Tight end	Penn State	
6	199	Leterrius Walton	Defensive tackle	Central Michigan	
6	212+	Anthony Chickillo	Outside linebacker	Miami (FL)	
7	239	Gerod Holliman	Free safety	Louisville	
Made roster † Pro Football Hall of Fame * Made at least one Pro Bowl during career

(+) Compensatory Selection

=== Undrafted free agents ===
All undrafted free agents were signed after the 2015 NFL draft concluded on May 2 unless otherwise noted.

Position	Player	College	Notes
TE	Cameron Clear	Texas A&M	
NT	Nigel Crawford-Kinney	St. Augustine's	
DE	Dominique Davis	Liberty	
G	Miles Dieffenbach	Penn State	
C	Reese Dismukes	Auburn	
G	B. J. Finney	Kansas State	
WR	Tyler Murphy	Boston College	
DE	Bradon Prate	Illinois State	
WR	Eli Rogers	Louisville	
RB	Ross Scheuerman	Lafayette	
T	Kevin Whimpey	Utah State	

== Staff ==
2015 marked a transition period for the Steelers defense, as longtime defensive coordinator Dick LeBeau resigned January 10. A member of the Pro Football Hall of Fame due to his 14-year playing career with the Detroit Lions, LeBeau served 13 seasons as the Steelers defensive coordinator under Tomlin and his predecessor Bill Cowher over two stints (1995–1996 and 2004–2014), and whose zone blitz defense ranked within the Top 5 in the NFL in total defense in 11 of those 13 seasons. At the time of his resignation, LeBeau was the NFL's longest-active tenured defensive coordinator. LeBeau, 77, mentioned that it was a "resignation, not retirement."

On January 13, longtime linebackers coach Keith Butler was promoted to succeed LeBeau. Butler stated that the team will continue to run the 3–4 defense as its primary package, but will also run some 4–3 packages, essentially converting the system to a hybrid 3–4. The Steelers have run the 3–4 since 1982, the longest such use of the 3–4 in NFL history.

2015 Pittsburgh Steelers staff
Front office: Chairman – Dan Rooney; President – Art Rooney II; Vice president – Art Rooney, Jr.; general manager – Kevin Colbert; Director of football and business administration – Omar Khan; Football administration coordinator – Samir Suleiman; Player personnel coordinator – Dan Rooney, Jr.; College scouting coordinator – Phil Kreidler; Senior assistant, college scouting – Rick Reiprish; Pro personnel coordinator – Brandon Hunt; Head coaches: Head coach – Mike Tomlin; Assistant head coach/defensive line – John Mitchell; Offensive coaches: Offensive coordinator – Todd Haley; Quarterbacks – Randy Fichtner; Running backs – James Saxon; Wide receivers – Richard Mann; Tight ends – James Daniel; Offensive line – Mike Munchak; Offensive assistant – Shaun Sarrett	Defensive coaches: Defensive coordinator – Keith Butler; Inside linebackers – Jerry Olsavsky; Outside linebackers – Joey Porter; Defensive backs – Carnell Lake; Defensive assistant – Steve Meyer; Special teams coaches: Special teams coordinator – Danny Smith; Strength and conditioning: Strength and conditioning – Garrett Giemont; Conditioning assistant – Marcel Pastoor

== Final roster ==
2015 Pittsburgh Steelers roster
Quarterbacks (QB): 3 Landry Jones; 7 Ben Roethlisberger; 2 Michael Vick; Running backs (RB): 46 Will Johnson FB; 30 Jordan Todman; 33 Fitzgerald Toussaint; 34 DeAngelo Williams; Wide receivers (WR): 84 Antonio Brown; 10 Martavis Bryant; 14 Sammie Coates; 88 Darrius Heyward-Bey; 11 Markus Wheaton; Tight ends (TE): 81 Jesse James; 83 Heath Miller; 89 Matt Spaeth	Offensive linemen (OL): 66 David DeCastro G; 73 Ramon Foster G; 77 Marcus Gilbert T; 74 Chris Hubbard T; 64 Doug Legursky C; 79 Byron Stingily T; 78 Alejandro Villanueva T; 72 Cody Wallace C; Defensive linemen (DL): 97 Cameron Heyward DE; 62 Daniel McCullers NT; 90 Steve McLendon NT; 93 Cam Thomas DE; 91 Stephon Tuitt DE; 96 L. T. Walton DE	Linebackers (LB): 56 Anthony Chickillo OLB; 48 Bud Dupree OLB; 54 L. J. Fort ILB; 57 Terence Garvin ILB; 92 James Harrison OLB; 95 Jarvis Jones OLB; 55 Arthur Moats OLB; 50 Ryan Shazier ILB; 51 Sean Spence ILB; 94 Lawrence Timmons ILB; 98 Vince Williams ILB; Defensive backs (DB): 20 Will Allen FS; 41 Antwon Blake CB; 25 Brandon Boykin CB; 31 Ross Cockrell CB; 22 William Gay CB; 21 Robert Golden FS; 24 Doran Grant CB; 23 Mike Mitchell SS; 29 Shamarko Thomas SS; 35 Ross Ventrone SS; Special teams (ST): 4 Jordan Berry P; 9 Chris Boswell K; 60 Greg Warren LS	Practice squad: 37 Jordan Dangerfield SS; 71 Matt Feiler T; 67 B. J. Finney C/G; 38 Isaiah Frey CB; 85 Xavier Grimble TE; 99 Caushaud Lyons DE; 16 Tyler Murphy WR; 44 Rajion Neal RB; 19 Shakim Phillips WR; Reserve: 76 Mike Adams T (PUP); 28 Cortez Allen CB (IR); 68 Kelvin Beachum T (IR); 26 Le'Veon Bell RB (IR); 87 Rob Blanchflower TE (IR); 96 Clifton Geathers DE (IR); 27 Senquez Golson CB (IR); 5 Bruce Gradkowski QB (IR); -- Micah Hatchie T (IR); 15 David Nelson WR (IR); 45 Roosevelt Nix FB (IR); 69 Kelvin Palmer T (IR); 53 Maurkice Pouncey C (IR); 17 Eli Rogers WR (IR); 6 Shaun Suisham K (IR); -- Mitchell Van Dyk T (IR); -- Jordan Zumwalt ILB (IR); Rookies in italics 53 active, 17 reserve, 9 practice squad

== Schedule ==
=== Training camp ===
The Steelers held training camp at Saint Vincent College in Latrobe, Pennsylvania. It marked the 50th straight year that training camp was held at the college nestled in the Laurel Highlands, the third-longest active streak in the NFL behind the Green Bay Packers and Minnesota Vikings, who have held their respective training camps at the same sites since 1958 and 1961, respectively.

The Steelers were scheduled to have joint practices with the Buffalo Bills this preseason but, due to their commitment to play in the Pro Football Hall of Fame Game, they canceled the joint practices but agreed to still play a later preseason game against the Bills on August 29. The Bills then scheduled joint practices with the Cleveland Browns at St. John Fisher College in Rochester, NY which then culminated with a preseason game against them on August 20 in Cleveland.

=== Preseason ===
Week	Date	Opponent	Result	Record	Venue	Recap
HOF	August 9	vs. Minnesota Vikings	**L** 3–14	0–1	Tom Benson Hall of Fame Stadium (Canton)	Recap
1	August 14	at Jacksonville Jaguars	**L** 21–23	0–2	EverBank Field	Recap
2	August 23	Green Bay Packers	**W** 24–19	1–2	Heinz Field	Recap
3	August 29	at Buffalo Bills	**L** 19–43	1–3	Ralph Wilson Stadium	Recap
4	September 3	Carolina Panthers	**L** 6–23	1–4	Heinz Field	Recap

=== Regular season ===
Due to the modified scheduling changes that were made for the 2010 season, 2015 marked several firsts for the Steelers. It marked the first time the Steelers have hosted the Arizona Cardinals since 2003 (having played them at University of Phoenix Stadium twice in that span, as well as Super Bowl XLIII), the first time hosting the Denver Broncos since 2006 (having played them five times since then, all at Sports Authority Field at Mile High), the first time playing the San Diego Chargers on the road since 2006 (having played them four times since, all at home, and ultimately the Steelers last trip to San Diego before the Chargers returned to Los Angeles in 2017) and the first time visiting the Seattle Seahawks since 2003, having played them away from Seattle three times since, twice at home as well as Super Bowl XL.

Week	Date	Opponent	Result	Record	Venue	Recap
1	September 10	at New England Patriots	**L** 21–28	0–1	Gillette Stadium	Recap
2	September 20	San Francisco 49ers	**W** 43–18	1–1	Heinz Field	Recap
3	September 27	at St. Louis Rams	**W** 12–6	2–1	Edward Jones Dome	Recap
4	October 1	**Baltimore Ravens**	**L** 20–23 (OT)	2–2	Heinz Field	Recap
5	October 12	at San Diego Chargers	**W** 24–20	3–2	Qualcomm Stadium	Recap
6	October 18	Arizona Cardinals	**W** 25–13	4–2	Heinz Field	Recap
7	October 25	at Kansas City Chiefs	**L** 13–23	4–3	Arrowhead Stadium	Recap
8	November 1	**Cincinnati Bengals**	**L** 10–16	4–4	Heinz Field	Recap
9	November 8	Oakland Raiders	**W** 38–35	5–4	Heinz Field	Recap
10	November 15	**Cleveland Browns**	**W** 30–9	6–4	Heinz Field	Recap
11	Bye					
12	November 29	at Seattle Seahawks	**L** 30–39	6–5	CenturyLink Field	Recap
13	December 6	Indianapolis Colts	**W** 45–10	7–5	Heinz Field	Recap
14	December 13	at **Cincinnati Bengals**	**W** 33–20	8–5	Paul Brown Stadium	Recap
15	December 20	Denver Broncos	**W** 34–27	9–5	Heinz Field	Recap
16	December 27	at **Baltimore Ravens**	**L** 17–20	9–6	M&T Bank Stadium	Recap
17	January 3	at **Cleveland Browns**	**W** 28–12	10–6	FirstEnergy Stadium	Recap

Note: Intra-division opponents are in bold text.

=== Postseason ===
Round	Date	Opponent (seed)	Result	Record	Venue	Recap
Wild Card	January 9	at Cincinnati Bengals (3)	**W** 18–16	1–0	Paul Brown Stadium	Recap
Divisional	January 17	at Denver Broncos (1)	**L** 16–23	1–1	Sports Authority Field at Mile High	Recap

== Game summaries ==
=== Regular season ===
==== Week 1: at New England Patriots ====
NFL Kickoff game

Week One: Pittsburgh Steelers at New England Patriots – Game summary

Quarter	1	2	3	4	Total
Steelers	0	3	8	10	21
Patriots	0	14	7	7	28

at Gillette Stadium, Foxborough, Massachusetts

- Date: September 10
- Game time: 8:30 p.m. EDT
- Game weather: 65 °F (18 °C), rainy and cool
- Game attendance: 66,829
- Referee: Carl Cheffers
- TV announcers (NBC): Al Michaels, Cris Collinsworth and Michele Tafoya
- Recap, Gamebook

Game information

First quarter

- No scoring plays

Second quarter

- NE – 11:11 Rob Gronkowski 16-yard pass from Tom Brady, (Stephen Gostkowski kick), Drive: 13 plays, 90 yards, 7:03. (NE 7-0)
- NE – 4:01 Rob Gronkowski 6-yard pass from Tom Brady, (Stephen Gostkowski kick), Drive: 9 plays, 64 yards, 4:37. (NE 14-0)
- PIT – 0:03 Josh Scobee 44-yard field goal, Drive: 11 plays, 57 yards, 3:58. (NE 14-3)

Third quarter

- NE – 10:37 Scott Chandler 1-yard pass from Tom Brady, (Stephen Gostkowski kick), Drive: 9 plays, 80 yards, 4:23. (NE 21-3)
- PIT– 6:43 Will Johnson 1-yard run, (2-PT conversion pass Ben Roethlisberger to Markus Wheaton), Drive: 7 plays, 80 yards, 3:54. (NE 21-11)

Fourth quarter

- PIT – 11:39 Josh Scobee 24-yard field goal, Drive: 13 plays, 67 yards, 7:36. (NE 21-14)
- NE – 9:20 Rob Gronkowski 1-yard pass from Tom Brady, (Stephen Gostkowski kick), Drive: 7 plays, 79 yards, 2:19. (NE 28-14)
- PIT– 0:02 Antonio Brown 11-yard pass from Ben Roethlisberger, (Josh Scobee kick), Drive: 12 plays, 70 yards, 2:57. (NE 28-21)

Top passers

- PIT – Ben Roethlisberger – 26/38, 351 yards, TD, INT
- NE – Tom Brady – 25/32, 288 yards, 4 TD

Top rushers

- PIT – DeAngelo Williams – 21 rushes, 127 yards
- NE – Dion Lewis – 15 rushes, 69 yards

Top receivers

- PIT – Antonio Brown – 9 rec, 133 yards, TD
- NE – Julian Edelman – 11 rec, 97 yards

Top tacklers

- PIT – Will Allen – 8 tackles, 1 sack
- NE – Dont'a Hightower – 6 tackles, 1 sack

The Steelers opened their season on the road against the defending Super Bowl Champion Patriots. After a scoreless first quarter, the Patriots scored first in the second quarter when Tom Brady found Rob Gronkowski on 2 consecutive touchdown passes: from 16 and 6 yards out for leads of 7–0 and 14–0. The Steelers got on the board before halftime when Josh Scobee kicked a 44-yard field goal for a 14–3 game. In the third quarter, Brady found Scott Chandler on a 1-yard touchdown pass for a 21–3 lead. The Steelers responded with Will Johnson's 1-yard run for a touchdown and a 2-point conversion tacked on for a 21–11 game. In the fourth quarter, the Steelers scored again as Scobee kicked a 24-yard field goal. Brady and Gronkowski hooked up again on a 1-yard pass for a 28–14 lead. Getting the ball back with seconds left, Ben Roethlisberger found Antonio Brown on an 11-yard touchdown pass for a final score of 28–21.

With the loss, the Steelers started their season 0–1. It also dropped the team to 2–1 in Kickoff Games.

==== Week 2: vs. San Francisco 49ers ====
Week Two: San Francisco 49ers at Pittsburgh Steelers – Game summary

Quarter	1	2	3	4	Total
49ers	0	3	0	15	18
Steelers	8	21	0	14	43

at Heinz Field, Pittsburgh, Pennsylvania

- Date: September 20
- Game time: 1:00 pm. EDT
- Game weather: 66 °F (19 °C), partly cloudy
- Game attendance: 66,472
- Referee: Craig Wrolstad
- TV announcers (Fox): Kenny Albert, Daryl Johnston and Laura Okmin
- Recap, Gamebook

Game information

First quarter

- PIT - 4:20 Heath Miller 2-yard pass from Ben Roethlisberger, (2-PT Conversion pass Ben Roethlisberger to Antonio Brown), Drive: 8 plays, 83 yards, 3:19. (PIT 8-0)

Second quarter

- SF - 10:27 Phil Dawson 47-yard FG. Drive: 17 plays, 58 yards, 8:53. (PIT 8-3)
- PIT - 8:07 DeAngelo Williams 2-yard TD run, (2-PT Conversion pass Ben Roethlisberger to Heath Miller), Drive: 7 plays, 80 yards, 2:20. (PIT 16-3)
- PIT - 5:45 Darrius Heyward-Bey 35-yard pass from Ben Roethlisberger, (Josh Scobee missed XP), Drive: 1 play, 35 yards, 0:07. (PIT 22-3)
- PIT - 1:58 DeAngelo Williams 2-yard TD run, (Josh Scobee kick), Drive: 6 plays, 42 yards, 2:42. (PIT 29-3)

Third quarter

- No scoring plays

Fourth quarter

- SF - 13:16 Anquan Boldin 14-yard pass from Colin Kaepernick, (Phil Dawson kick), Drive: 6 plays, 64 yards, 1:51. (PIT 29-10)
- PIT - 10:25 DeAngelo Williams 1-yard TD run, (Josh Scobee kick), Drive: 6 plays, 80 yards, 2:51. (PIT 36-10)
- SF - 9:43 Torrey Smith 75-yard pass from Colin Kaepernick, (2-PT Conversion pass Colin Kaepernick to Torrey Smith), Drive: 2 plays, 80 yards, 0:42. (PIT 36-18)
- PIT - 7:43 Antonio Brown 7-yard pass from Ben Roethlisberger, (Josh Scobee kick), Drive: 5 plays, 80 yards, 2:00. (PIT 43-18)

Top passers

- SF – Colin Kaepernick 33/46, 335 yards, 2 TD
- PIT – Ben Roethlisberger 21/27, 369 yards, 3 TD

Top rushers

- SF – Colin Kaepernick 9 rushes, 51 Yards
- PIT – DeAngelo Williams 20 rushes, 77 Yards, 3 TD

Top receivers

- SF – Torrey Smith 6 rec, 120 Yards, 1 TD
- PIT – Antonio Brown 9 rec, 195 Yards, 1 TD

Top tacklers

- SF – Eric Reid 6 Tackles
- PIT – Ryan Shazier 15 Tackles, 1 Sack, 1 Forced Fumble

After a tough loss, the Steelers went home to take on the 49ers. They struck first in the first quarter when Ben Roethlisberger found Heath Miller on a 2-yard TD pass (with a successful 2-point conversion) for an 8–0 lead. The Niners were able to get on the board in the second quarter when Phil Dawson kicked a 47-yard field goal shortening the lead to 8–3. The Steelers however pulled away later on as De'Angelo Williams ran for a 2-yard TD (with another successful 2-point conversion) for a 16–3 lead followed up by Roethlisberger finding Darrius Heyward-Bay on a 35-yard TD pass (with a failed PAT) for a 22–3 lead and finally Williams rushing for another 2-yard TD before halftime to take a 29–3 lead. After a scoreless third quarter, the Niners went to work in the fourth when Colin Kaepernick found Anquan Boldin on a 14-yard TD pass to move behind 29–10. The Steelers however pulled away when Williams ran for a 1-yard TD to move on up 36–10. The Niners drew closer when Kaepernick found Torrey Smith on a 75-yard TD pass (with a successful 2-point conversion) to make the score 36–18. The Steelers however wrapped up the scoring of the game when Roethlisberger found Antonio Brown on a 7-yard TD pass for the final score 43–18.

With the win, the Steelers improved to 1–1.

The defense had a field day on Kaepernick by sacking him 5 times and forcing a fumble which they recovered.

==== Week 3: at St. Louis Rams ====
Week Three: Pittsburgh Steelers at St. Louis Rams – Game summary

Quarter	1	2	3	4	Total
Steelers	3	6	0	3	12
Rams	0	3	0	3	6

at Edward Jones Dome, St. Louis, Missouri

- Date: September 27
- Game time: 1:00 pm. EDT/12:00 p.m. CDT
- Game weather: Played indoors (dome stadium)
- Game attendance: 52,433
- Referee: John Hussey
- TV announcers (CBS): Greg Gumbel, Trent Green and Jamie Erdahl
- Recap, Gamebook

Game information

First quarter

- PIT – 7:18 Josh Scobee 21-yard FG. Drive: 7 plays, 77 yards, 7:42 (PIT 3–0)

Second quarter

- PIT – 13:00 Le'Veon Bell 1-yard TD run, (2-point pass attempt failed.) Drive: 12 plays, 92 yards, 6:03 (PIT 9-0)
- STL – 2:05 Greg Zuerlein 49-yard FG. Drive: 9 plays, 50 yards, 4:47 (PIT 9–3)

Third quarter

- No scoring plays

Fourth quarter

- STL – 5:38 Greg Zuerlein 27-yard FG. Drive: 7 plays, 62 yards, 4:06 (PIT 9–6)
- PIT – 1:56 Josh Scobee 41-yard FG. Drive: 4 plays, 8 yards, 0:55 (PIT 12–6)

Top passers

- PIT – Ben Roethlisberger 20/24, 192 yards, 1 INT
- STL – Nick Foles 19/28, 197 yards, 1 INT

Top rushers

- PIT – Le'Veon Bell 19 rushes, 62 yards, 1 TD
- STL – Chris Givens 1 rush, 24 yards

Top receivers

- PIT – Antonio Brown 11 rec, 108 yards
- STL – Kenny Britt 7 rec, 102 yards

Top tacklers

- PIT – Stephon Tuitt 5 tackles, 1 sack
- STL – Janoris Jenkins 6 tackles, 1 INT

Coming off their big home win over San Francisco, the Steelers traveled to St. Louis to take on the Rams in the Edward Jones Dome. After a long delay before the game due to the field catching fire from a pyrotechnical error during the Rams' entrance, the game got underway. Pittsburgh got on the board early with a Josh Scobee field goal, and held the Rams scoreless for the first quarter. Early in the second quarter, Rams' kicker Greg Zuerlein gave them a field goal, tying the game. But, the returning Le'Veon Bell scored on a one-yard run in the second quarter; Pittsburgh failed to convert on a two-point play, but lead 9–3. The score remained this way for most of the game, and neither team scored in the third quarter. Quarterback Ben Roethlisberger injured his left knee mid-third quarter; he was carted off-field and Michael Vick replaced him for the remainder of the game. Zuerlein added to the Rams' score with another field goal, inching the Rams closer 9–6. But, Scobee kicked another field goal for the Steelers, increasing their lead 12–6. St. Louis failed to convert late in the game, and Vick kneeled down to end the game.

With their win and a Cleveland loss to Oakland, the Steelers improved to 2–1 and took sole possession of second in the AFC North.

==== Week 4: vs. Baltimore Ravens ====
Week Four: Baltimore Ravens at Pittsburgh Steelers – Game summary

Quarter	1	2	3	4	OT	Total
Ravens	7	0	7	6	3	23
Steelers	3	10	7	0	0	20

at Heinz Field, Pittsburgh, Pennsylvania

- Date: October 1
- Game time: 8:30 pm. EDT
- Game weather: 63 °F (17 °C), cloudy
- Game attendance: 63,929
- Referee: Clete Blakeman
- TV announcers (CBS/NFLN): Jim Nantz, Phil Simms and Tracy Wolfson
- Recap, Gamebook

Game information

First quarter

- PIT – 7:41 Josh Scobee 45-yard FG. Drive: 8 plays, 52 yards, 4:59 (PIT 3–0)
- BAL - 0:25 Michael Campanaro 9-yard TD run, Justin Tucker kick. Drive: 12 plays, 75 yards, 7:16 (BAL 7–3)

Second quarter

- PIT - 1:37 Le'Veon Bell 11-yard TD run, Josh Scobee kick. Drive: 8 plays, 67 yards, 3:09 (PIT 10–7)
- PIT – 0:01 Josh Scobee 36-yard FG. Drive: 5 plays, 27 yards, 0:39 (PIT 13–7)

Third quarter

- PIT – 10:41 Darrius Heyward-Bey 9-yard TD pass from Michael Vick, Josh Scobee kick. Drive: 6 plays, 26 yards, 4:08 (PIT 20-7)
- BAL – 7:27 Kamar Aiken 15-yard TD pass from Joe Flacco, Justin Tucker kick. Drive: 6 plays, 80 yards, 3:14 (PIT 20-14)

Fourth quarter

- BAL – 10:14 Justin Tucker 40-yard FG. Drive: 12 plays, 38 yards, 6:58 (PIT 20-17)
- BAL – 0:03 Justin Tucker 42-yard FG. Drive: 1 play, -1 yard, 0:03 (BAL 20-20)

Overtime

- BAL – Justin Tucker 52-yard FG. Drive: 8 plays, 32 yards, 4:33 (BAL 23-20)

Top passers

- BAL – Joe Flacco 20/33, 189 yards, 1 TD, 1 INT
- PIT – Michael Vick 19/26, 124 yards, 1 TD

Top rushers

- BAL – Justin Forsett 27 rushes, 150 yards
- PIT – Le'Veon Bell 22 rushes, 129 yards, 1 TD

Top receivers

- BAL – Kamar Aiken 5 rec, 77 yards, 1 TD
- PIT – Antonio Brown 5 rec, 42 yards

Top tacklers

- BAL – Daryl Smith 9 tackles, 1 sack
- PIT – Lawrence Timmons 10 tackles, 1 sack

Justin Tucker made a 52-yard field goal with 5:08 left in overtime to give the Baltimore Ravens a 23–20 victory over the Pittsburgh Steelers on Thursday night.

Tucker tied it with 3 seconds to go in regulation after Pittsburgh's Josh Scobee missed a pair of kicks that would have given the Steelers some cushion. Tucker then won it in the extra period after the Steelers failed to convert a pair of fourth downs in Baltimore territory.

The Steelers defense had another stellar outing, sacking Joe Flacco five times and forcing two turnovers. Michael Vick threw for 124 yards and a score and avoided committing any turnovers while starting in place of the injured Ben Roethlisberger. All helped lead the team to a 20–7 lead early in the third quarter. However, the Steelers offense stalled after, and Baltimore took advantage dropping the team to 2–2.

Antonio Brown's 5/50 receiving streak was broken after 35 consecutive games. He finished with 5 receptions, but missed the 50-yard mark by 8 yards.

==== Week 5: at San Diego Chargers ====
Week Five: Pittsburgh Steelers at San Diego Chargers – Game summary

Quarter	1	2	3	4	Total
Steelers	0	3	7	14	24
Chargers	7	0	0	13	20

at Qualcomm Stadium, San Diego, California

- Date: October 12
- Game time: 8:30 pm. EDT/5:30 p.m. PDT
- Game weather: 93 °F (34 °C), partly cloudy
- Game attendance: 67,658
- Referee: Pete Morelli
- TV announcers (ESPN): Mike Tirico, Jon Gruden and Lisa Salters
- Recap, Gamebook

Game information

First quarter

- SD – 9:50 Antonio Gates 12-yard TD pass from Philip Rivers, Josh Lambo kick. Drive: 5 plays, 84 yards, 2:22 (SD 7-0)

Second quarter

- PIT – 4:24 Chris Boswell 47-yard FG. Drive: 9 plays, 47 yards, 5:38 (SD 7-3)

Third quarter

- PIT – 3:21 Antwon Blake 70-yard interception return, Chris Boswell kick. Drive: 9 plays, 49 yards, 3:39 (PIT 10-7)

Fourth quarter

- SD – 14:49 Josh Lambo 40-yard FG. Drive: 8 plays, 58 yards, 3:32 (SD 10-10)
- SD – 8:02 Antonio Gates 11-yard TD pass from Philip Rivers, Josh Lambo kick. Drive: 8 plays, 60 yards, 5:50 (SD 17-10)
- PIT – 7:42 Markus Wheaton 72-yard TD pass from Michael Vick, Chris Boswell kick. Drive: 1 plays, 72 yards, 0:20 (PIT 17-17)
- SD – 2:56 Josh Lambo 54-yard FG. Drive: 12 plays, 44 yards, 4:46 (SD 20-17)
- PIT - 0:00 Le'Veon Bell 1-yard TD run, Chris Boswell kick. Drive: 12 plays, 80 yards, 2:56 (PIT 24–20)

Top passers

- PIT – Michael Vick 13/26, 203 yards, 1 TD, 1 INT
- SD – Philip Rivers 35/48, 365 yards, 2 TD 1 INT

Top rushers

- PIT – Le'Veon Bell 21 rushes, 111 yards, 1 TD
- SD – Melvin Gordon 15 rushes, 42 yards

Top receivers

- PIT – Markus Wheaton 1 rec, 72 yards, 1 TD
- SD – Antonio Gates 9 rec, 92 yards, 2 TD

Top tacklers

- PIT – Lawrence Timmons 9 tackles
- SD – Jeremiah Attaochu 9 tackles

After a tough home loss to the Ravens, the Steelers traveled to San Diego to take on the Chargers. The Chargers scored first in the first quarter when Philip Rivers found Antonio Gates on a 12-yard pass for a 7–0 lead. The Steelers got on the board in the 2nd quarter when Chris Boswell nailed a 47-yard field goal for a 7–3 game at halftime. After the break, the Steelers took the lead as Antwon Blake picked off Philip Rivers and returned it 70 yards for a TD and a 10–7 lead for the only score of the period. In the 4th quarter the Chargers scored 10 points first tying the game 10–10 when Josh Lambo kicked a 40-yard field goal followed up by Rivers and Gates hooking up again this time on an 11-yard TD pass for a 17–10 lead. The Steelers tied the game back up when Michael Vick found Markus Wheaton on a 72-yard TD pass for a 17–17 game. The Chargers retook the lead when Lambo kicked a 54-yard field goal for a 20–17 lead. Getting the ball back with less than 2 minutes left, the Steelers drove down the field. Le'Veon Bell ran for a TD from a yard out as time expired to win the game. With the game 23–20, officials had to review it to make sure he reached in before his knee hit the ground. The call stood and then Boswell kicked the PAT for a 24–20 victory.

The Steelers defense continued their surprising resurgence of sacks and takeaways by sacking Rivers twice and getting two more turnovers. The offense scored on their final possession as time expired to clinch a much-needed road win against the Chargers. The win improved the Steelers to 3–2 on the season and snapped a five-game losing streak in California.

==== Week 6: vs. Arizona Cardinals ====
Week Six: Arizona Cardinals at Pittsburgh Steelers – Game summary

Quarter	1	2	3	4	Total
Cardinals	7	3	0	3	13
Steelers	0	3	12	10	25

at Heinz Field, Pittsburgh, Pennsylvania

- Date: October 18
- Game time: 1:00 pm. EDT
- Game weather: 45 °F (7 °C), mostly cloudy
- Game attendance: 63,846
- Referee: Ed Hochuli
- TV announcers (Fox): Thom Brennaman, Troy Aikman and Peter Schrager
- Recap, Gamebook

Game information

First quarter

- ARI – 8:17 Michael Floyd 3-yard pass from Carson Palmer, (Chandler Catanzaro kick), Drive: 6 plays, 47 yards, 2:57. (ARI 7-0)

Second quarter

- PIT – 6:06 Chris Boswell 47-yard FG. Drive: 5 plays, 34 yards, 3:12 (ARI 7-3)
- ARI – 0:47 Chandler Catanzaro 31-yard FG. Drive: 13 plays, 68 yards, 5:19 (ARI 10-3)

Third quarter

- PIT – 11:14 Chris Boswell 48-yard FG. Drive: 7 plays, 31 yards, 3:46 (ARI 10-6)
- PIT – 8:45 Martavis Bryant 8-yard TD pass from Landry Jones, (2-point pass attempt failed), Drive: 4 plays, 32 yards, 1:36 (PIT 12-10)
- PIT – 2:32 Chris Boswell 51-yard FG. Drive: 7 plays, 26 yards, 3:28 (PIT 15-10)

Fourth quarter

- ARI – 14:56 Chandler Catanzaro 39-yard FG. Drive: 6 plays, 61 yards, 2:36 (PIT 15-13)
- PIT – 7:19 Chris Boswell 28-yard FG. Drive: 13 plays, 68 yards, 7:37 (PIT 18-13)
- PIT – 1:58 Martavis Bryant 88-yard TD pass from Landry Jones, (Chris Boswell kick), Drive: 2 plays, 90 yards, 0:22 (PIT 25-13)

Top passers

- ARI – Carson Palmer 29/45, 421 Yards, 1 TD, 2 INT
- PIT – Landry Jones 8/12, 168 Yards, 2 TD

Top rushers

- ARI – Chris Johnson 14 rushes, 40 yards
- PIT – Le'Veon Bell 24 rushes, 88 yards

Top receivers

- ARI – John Brown 10 rec, 196 Yards
- PIT – Martavis Bryant 6 rec, 137 Yards, 2 TD

Top tacklers

- ARI – Deone Bucannon 7 tackles
- PIT – Antwon Blake 12 tackles

After a tough road win over the Bolts, the Steelers returned home to take on the Cardinals. The Cards would strike first in the first quarter when Carson Palmer found Michael Floyd on a 3-yard pass for a 7–0 lead for the only score of the period. The Steelers got on the board in the 2nd quarter when Chris Boswell nailed a 47-yard field goal for a 7–3 game before the Cards moved ahead by a TD after Chandler Catanzaro kicked a field goal of his own from 31 yards out for a 10–3 game at halftime. After the break, in the third quarter it was all Steelers as Boswell kicked another field goal. This was from 48 yards out to get the Steelers within 4, 10–6. 3rd-string QB Landry Jones replaced Michael Vick for the rest of the game and threw his first career TD to Martavis Bryant from 8 yards out (with a failed 2-point conversion) and a 12–10 lead. Boswell hit a field goal from 51 yards out to send the Steelers up by 5, 15–10. In the fourth quarter, the Cards narrowed the Steelers' lead as Catanzaro kicked a 39-yard field goal for a 15–13 game. The Steelers increased their lead when Boswell made a 28-yard field goal for an 18–13 game. Finally, they were able to seal the game when Jones found Bryant on an 88-yard pass for the final score of 25–13.

With the win, the Steelers improved to 4–2. The defense also continued their stellar outings in sacks and takeaways such as sacking Palmer once, picking him off twice, and recovering a fumble. This was Michael Vick’s last start in an NFL Game.

==== Week 7: at Kansas City Chiefs ====
Week Seven: Pittsburgh Steelers at Kansas City Chiefs – Game summary

Quarter	1	2	3	4	Total
Steelers	3	0	7	3	13
Chiefs	3	6	7	7	23

at Arrowhead Stadium, Kansas City, Missouri

- Date: October 25
- Game time: 1:00 pm. EDT/12:00 p.m. CDT
- Game weather: 58 °F (14 °C), sunny
- Game attendance: 76,365
- Referee: Walt Coleman
- TV announcers (CBS): Greg Gumbel, Trent Green and Stacey Dales
- Recap, Gamebook

Game information

First quarter

- KC – 8:47 Cairo Santos 30-yard Field Goal Drive: 10 plays, 48 yards, 4:08 (KC 3-0)
- PIT – 0:59 Chris Boswell 24-yard Field Goal Drive: 14 plays, 61 yards, 7:48 (TIE 3-3)

Second quarter

- KC – 8:55 Cairo Santos 22-yard Field Goal Drive: 13 plays, 77 yards, 7:04 (KC 6-3)
- KC – 1:00 Cairo Santos 27-yard Field Goal Drive: 8 plays, 59 yards, 3:41 (KC 9-3)

Third quarter

- KC – 4:23 Charcandrick West 1 yard run (Cairo Santos kick) Drive: 9 plays, 53 yards, 5:22 (KC 16-3)
- PIT – 1:40 Martavis Bryant 19-yard pass from Landry Jones (Chris Boswell kick) Drive: 6 plays, 77 yards, 2:43 (KC 16-10)

Fourth quarter

- PIT – 10:17 Chris Boswell 36-yard Field Goal Drive: 7 plays, 54 yards, 3:56 (KC 16-13)
- KC – 5:13 Chris Conley 6-yard pass from Alex Smith (Cairo Santos kick) Drive: 8 plays, 84 yards, 5:04 (KC 23-13)

Top passers

- PIT – Landry Jones 16/29, 209 yards, 1 TD, 2 INT
- KC – Alex Smith 21/32, 251 yards, 1 TD

Top rushers

- PIT – Le'Veon Bell 17 rushes, 121 yards
- KC – Charcandrick West 22 rushes, 110 yards, 1 TD

Top receivers

- PIT – Antonio Brown 6 rec, 124 yards
- KC – Chris Conley 6 rec, 63 yards

Top tacklers

- PIT – Lawrence Timmons 7 tackles
- KC – Marcus Peters 4 tackles

The Steelers traveled to Kansas City to take on the Chiefs. In the first quarter, the Chiefs scored first when Cairo Santos kicked a 30-yard field goal for a 3–0 lead. The Steelers would tie it up later on as Chris Boswell nailed a field goal from 24 yards out to make the game 3–3. In the second quarter, it was all Chiefs when Santos nailed 2 more field goals: from 27 and 22 yards out moving ahead 6–3 and the eventual halftime score of 9–3. After the break, the Chiefs moved ahead by double digits when Chircandrick West ran for a 1-yard touchdown for a 16–3 game. Backup QB Landry Jones was able to find Martavis Bryant on a 19-yard pass to make the score 16–10 for the Steelers later on in the third quarter. In the fourth quarter, the Steelers came within 3 when Boswell nailed another field goal from 36-yards out for a 16–13 game. However, the Chiefs eventually sealed the win when Alex Smith found Chris Conley on a 6-yard pass for a final score of 23–13.

With the loss, the Steelers fell to 4–3 and also 2–2 without Roethlisberger as the starter.

The defense failed to force any takeaways, but got inside the pocket and sacked Smith twice.

==== Week 8: vs. Cincinnati Bengals ====
Week Eight: Cincinnati Bengals at Pittsburgh Steelers – Game summary

Quarter	1	2	3	4	Total
Bengals	3	3	0	10	16
Steelers	7	0	3	0	10

at Heinz Field, Pittsburgh, Pennsylvania

- Date: November 1
- Game time: 1:00 pm. EST
- Game weather: 62 °F (17 °C), cloudy
- Game attendance: 64,750
- Referee: Tony Corrente
- TV announcers (CBS): Ian Eagle, Dan Fouts and Evan Washburn
- Recap, Gamebook

Game information

First quarter

- PIT - 7:46 Antonio Brown 1-yard pass from Ben Roethlisberger, (Chris Boswell kick), Drive: 12 plays, 80 yards, 7:14. (PIT 7-0)
- CIN - 2:50 Mike Nugent 44-yard Field Goal, Drive: 10 plays, 54 yards, 4:56. (PIT 7-3)

Second quarter

- CIN - 14:55 Mike Nugent 45-yard Field Goal, Drive: 5 plays, 12 yards, 1:46. (PIT 7-6)

Third quarter

- PIT - 6:27 Chris Boswell 32-yard Field Goal, Drive: 9 plays, 78 yards, 4:16. (PIT 10-6)

Fourth quarter

- CIN - 7:46 A. J. Green 9-yard pass from Andy Dalton, (Mike Nugent kick), Drive: 6 plays, 45 yards, 2:37. (CIN 13-10)
- CIN - 1:47 Mike Nugent 44-yard Field Goal, Drive: 4 plays, 0 yards, 0:57. (CIN 16-10)

Top passers

- CIN – Andy Dalton – 23/38, 231 yards, 1 TD, 2 INT
- PIT – Ben Roethlisberger - 28/45, 262 yards, 1 TD, 3 INT

Top rushers

- CIN – Jeremy Hill - 15 rushes, 60 yards
- PIT – DeAngelo Williams - 9 rushes, 71 yards

Top receivers

- CIN – A. J. Green - 11 rec, 118 yards, 1 TD
- PIT – Heath Miller - 10 rec, 105 yards

Top tacklers

- CIN – Vincent Rey - 8 tackles
- PIT – Antwon Blake - 8 tackles

After the tough loss to the Chiefs, the Steelers returned home for a game against the Bengals in a much-hyped game due to Ben Roethlisberger being back from injury. This was also game 1 of a 3-game home stand.

In the first quarter, the Steelers took an early lead as Ben found Antonio Brown on a 1-yard pass for a 7–0 lead. Later on, the Bengals came within 4 as Mike Nugent nailed a 44-yard field goal for a 7–3 game. In the second quarter, the Bengals came within a point as Nugent nailed a 45-yard field goal for a 7–6 game at halftime. In the third quarter, the Steelers increased their lead back to 4 as Chris Boswell nailed a 32-yard field goal to make it 10–6. In the fourth quarter however, it was all Bengals as they took the lead when Andy Dalton found A. J. Green on a 9-yard pass for a 13–10 game followed up by Nugent nailing another 44-yard field goal for the final score of 16–10.

With the loss, the Steelers fell to 4–4. Not only did they lose the game, but they also lost star running back Le'Veon Bell for the season due to a torn MCL.

Despite the loss, the defense had yet another stellar outing by picking off Dalton twice and sacking him three times.

As it later turned out, this was the final time the Steelers lost to Bengals head coach Marvin Lewis, as the Steelers wouldn't lose to Cincinnati again until 2020, when Zac Taylor was head coach. Pittsburgh won the final 8 games against the Lewis-led Bengals.

==== Week 9: Oakland Raiders ====
Week Nine: Oakland Raiders at Pittsburgh Steelers – Game summary

Quarter	1	2	3	4	Total
Raiders	7	7	7	14	35
Steelers	3	18	0	17	38

at Heinz Field, Pittsburgh, Pennsylvania

- Date: November 8
- Game time: 1:00 pm. EST
- Game weather: 54 °F (12 °C), sunny
- Game attendance: 65,520
- Referee: Bill Vinovich
- TV announcers (CBS): Ian Eagle, Dan Fouts and Evan Washburn
- Recap, Gamebook

Game information

First quarter

- OAK - 12:10 Michael Crabtree 22-yard pass from Derek Carr, (Sebastian Janikowski Kick), Drive: 3 plays, 66 yards, 0:43. (OAK 7-0)
- PIT - 4:40 Chris Boswell 34-yard Field Goal, Drive: 9 plays, 43 yards, 4:15. (OAK 7-3)

Second quarter

- PIT - 13:57 DeAngelo Williams 3-yard run, (2-PT Conversion pass Ben Roethlisberger to DeAngelo Williams), Drive: 6 plays, 83 yards, 2:39. (PIT 11-7)
- OAK - 6:05 Amari Cooper 15-yard pass from Derek Carr, (Sebastian Janikowski Kick), Drive: 7 plays, 40 yards, 3:47. (OAK 14-11)
- PIT - 1:56 DeAngelo Williams 3-yard run, (Chris Boswell kick), Drive: 9 plays, 78 yards, 4:09. (PIT 18-14)
- PIT - 0:29 Chris Boswell 38-yard Field Goal, Drive: 5 plays, 39 yards, 0:30. (PIT 21-14)

Third quarter

- OAK - 7:02 Clive Walford 1-yard pass from Derek Carr, (Sebastian Janikowski Kick), Drive: 9 plays, 90 yards, 4:29. (TIE 21-21)

Fourth quarter

- PIT - 12:13 Martavis Bryant 14-yard pass from Ben Roethlisberger, (Chris Boswell Kick), Drive: 9 plays, 91 yards, 4:00. (PIT 28-21)
- PIT - 11:24 Jesse James 4-yard pass from Ben Roethlisberger, (Chris Boswell Kick), Drive: 2 plays, 6 yards, 0:41. (PIT 35-21)
- OAK - 9:32 Jamize Olawale 19-yard run, (Sebastian Janikowski Kick), Drive: 4 plays, 60 yards, 1:52. (PIT 35-28)
- OAK - 1:15 Michael Crabtree 38-yard pass from Derek Carr, (Sebastian Janikowski Kick), Drive: 7 plays, 69 yards, 1:00. (TIE 35-35)
- PIT - 0:02 Chris Boswell 18-yard Field Goal, Drive: 7 plays, 79 yards, 1:13. (PIT 38-35)

Top passers

- OAK – Derek Carr 24/44, 301 yards, 4 TD, 1 INT
- PIT – Ben Roethlisberger 24/44, 344 yards, 2 TD, 1 INT

Top rushers

- OAK – Latavius Murray 17 rushes, 96 yards
- PIT – DeAngelo Williams 27 rushes, 170 yards, 2 TD

Top receivers

- OAK – Michael Crabtree 7 rec, 108 yards, 2 TD
- PIT – Antonio Brown 17 rec, 284 yards

Top tacklers

- OAK – D.J. Hayden 13 tackles
- PIT – Antwon Blake 9 tackles

The Steelers stayed home for Game 2 of a 3-game home stand against the Raiders. In the first quarter, the Raiders scored first as Derek Carr found Michael Crabtree on a 22-yard pass for a 7–0 lead. The Steelers got on the board later on in the quarter when Chris Boswell kicked a 34-yard field goal for a 7–3 game. In the 2nd quarter, the Steelers took the lead when DeAngelo Williams ran for a TD from 3 yards out (with a successful 2-point conversion) for an 11–7 game. The Raiders however, retook the lead when Carr found Amari Cooper on a 15-yard pass for a 14–11 lead. The Steelers closed the half when Williams ran for another 3-yard TD and Boswell kicked a 38-yard field goal for leads of 18–14 and then 21–14 at halftime. After the break, the Raiders went back to work tying the game up 21–21 when Carr found Clive Walford on a 1-yard pass for the only score of the third quarter. In the fourth quarter, the Steelers were able to retake the lead as Ben Roethlisberger found Martavis Bryant on a 14-yard pass for a 28–21 game. Roethlisberger then found Jesse James on a 4-yard pass for a 35–21 game. The Raiders would tie the game back up with 2 straight TDs of their own: First coming from Jamize Olawale who ran from 19 yards out for a 35–28 game and then Carr finding Crabtree again on a 38-yard pass to make it 35–35. Getting the ball back with seconds left, the Steelers had to depend on backup QB Landry Jones to help them get within field goal range. They would successfully do so and then Boswell kicked the game-winning 18-yard field goal for a 38–35 final score.

With the win, the Steelers improved to 5–4.

The defense failed to sack Carr, but recorded 4 takeaways.

==== Week 10: vs. Cleveland Browns ====
Week Ten: Cleveland Browns at Pittsburgh Steelers – Game summary

Quarter	1	2	3	4	Total
Browns	3	0	0	6	9
Steelers	6	15	3	6	30

at Heinz Field, Pittsburgh, Pennsylvania

- Date: November 15
- Game time: 1:00 pm. EST
- Game weather: 61 °F (16 °C), sunny
- Game attendance: 64,402
- Referee: Ron Torbert
- TV announcers (CBS): Ian Eagle, Dan Fouts and Evan Washburn
- Recap, Gamebook

Game information

First quarter

- PIT – Chris Boswell 24-yard field goal, 11:02. Steelers 3–0. Drive: 4 plays, 6 yards, 1:27.
- CLE – Travis Coons 23-yard field goal, 8:09. Tied 3–3. Drive: 7 plays, 67 yards, 2:53.
- PIT – Chris Boswell 34-yard field goal, 4:49. Steelers 6–3. Drive: 9 plays, 64 yards, 3:21.

Second quarter

- PIT – Antonio Brown 4-yard pass from Ben Roethlisberger (Ben Roethlisberger-Antonio Brown pass), 3:32. Steelers 14–3. Drive: 8 plays, 92 yards, 3:49.
- PIT – Martavis Bryant 32-yard pass from Ben Roethlisberger (Chris Boswell kick), 0:42. Steelers 21–3. Drive: 2 plays, 47 yards, 0:28.

Third quarter

- PIT – Chris Boswell 25-yard field goal, 8:36. Steelers 24–3. Drive: 6 plays, 80 yards, 1:38.

Fourth quarter

- CLE – Gary Barnidge 7-yard pass from Johnny Manziel (kick failed), 12:33. Steelers 24–9. Drive: 2 plays, 11 yards, 0:46.
- PIT – Antonio Brown 56-yard pass from Ben Roethlisberger (kick failed), 9:17. Steelers 30–9. Drive: 7 plays, 80 yards, 3:21.

Top passers

- CLE – Johnny Manziel – 33/45, 372 yards, TD, INT
- PIT – Ben Roethlisberger – 22/33, 379 yards, 3 TD, INT

Top rushers

- CLE – Johnny Manziel – 3 rushes, 17 yards
- PIT – DeAngelo Williams – 17 rushes, 54 yards

Top receivers

- CLE – Travis Benjamin – 7 receptions, 113 yards
- PIT – Martavis Bryant – 6 receptions, 178 yards, TD

Top tacklers

- CLE – Karlos Dansby – 3 tackles, 3 assists
- PIT – Will Allen – 9 tackles, 2 assists, 1 forced fumble

The Steelers' last game in the 3-game home stand was against the Browns. Backup QB Landry Jones started the game, but left due to injury and was replaced by Ben Roethlisberger. In the first quarter, the Steelers grabbed an early lead as Chris Boswell nailed a 24-yard field goal for a 3–0 lead. However, the Browns tied it up at 3–3 when Travis Coons kicked a 23-yard field goal. The Steelers would retake the lead later on in the quarter when Boswell nailed a 34-yard field goal for a 6–3 game. In the second quarter, it was all Steelers when Roethlisberger found Antonio Brown on a 4-yard pass (with a successful 2-point conversion) for a 14–3 lead followed up by Roethlisberger finding Martavis Bryant on a 32-yard pass for a 21–3 lead at halftime. In the third quarter, the Steelers went back to work as Boswell kicked a 25-yard field goal for a 24–3 game for the only score of the period. In the fourth quarter, Johnny Manziel found Gary Barnidge on a 7-yard pass (with a failed PAT) for a 24–9 game. The Steelers later on would wrap the game up when Roethlisberger and Brown hooked up again this time on a 56-yard pass (with a failed PAT) for the final score of 30–9.

With the win, the Steelers head into their bye week at 6–4, and finally won a game within their division while also winning consecutive conference games for the first time in the season. The team also improves to 3–2 when Ben doesn't start and also finishes 2–1 in the 3-game home stand.

The defense also stood out by sacking Manziel 6 times and got 3 turnovers.

==== Week 11: Bye Week ====
No game. Pittsburgh had a bye week.

==== Week 12: at Seattle Seahawks ====
Week Twelve: Pittsburgh Steelers at Seattle Seahawks – Game summary

Quarter	1	2	3	4	Total
Steelers	3	15	3	9	30
Seahawks	0	14	6	19	39

at CenturyLink Field, Seattle, Washington

- Date: November 29
- Game time: 4:25 pm. EST/1:25 pm. PST
- Game weather: 38 °F (3 °C), cloudy
- Game attendance: 69,055
- Referee: Walt Anderson
- TV announcers (CBS): Jim Nantz, Phil Simms and Tracy Wolfson
- Recap, Gamebook

Game information

First quarter

- PIT – 5:32 Chris Boswell 47-yard Field Goal, Drive: 12 plays, 58 yards, 5:40. (PIT 3–0)

Second quarter

- SEA – 12:18 Doug Baldwin 16-yard pass from Russell Wilson, (Steven Hauschka kick), Drive: 6 plays, 24 yards, 2:27. (SEA 7-3)
- PIT– 8:39 Martavis Bryant 11-yard run, (Chris Boswell kick), Drive: 7 plays, 49 yards, 3:39. (PIT 10-7)
- SEA – 2:10 Jermaine Kearse 12-yard pass from Russell Wilson, (Steven Hauschka kick), Drive: 11 plays, 85 yards, 6:29. (SEA 14-10)
- PIT– 0:56 DeAngelo Williams 6-yard run, (2-PT conversion pass Ben Roethlisberger to Jesse James), Drive: 8 plays, 80 yards, 1:14. (PIT 18-14)

Third quarter

- PIT – 5:51 Chris Boswell 25-yard Field Goal, Drive: 11 plays, 78 yards, 6:58. (PIT 21–14)
- SEA– 3:00 Thomas Rawls 1-yard run, (Steven Hauschka blocked XP), Drive: 2 plays, 37 yards, 0:36. (PIT 21-20)

Fourth quarter

- SEA – 12:17 Jermaine Kearse 9-yard pass from Russell Wilson, (2-PT pass conversion failed), Drive: 4 plays, 39 yards, 1:48. (SEA 26-21)
- PIT – 11:40 Markus Wheaton 69-yard pass from Ben Roethlisberger, (2-PT pass conversion failed), Drive: 3 plays, 80 yards, 0:37. (PIT 27-26)
- SEA – 8:12 Doug Baldwin 30-yard pass from Russell Wilson, (2-PT rush conversion failed), Drive: 6 plays, 73 yards, 3:28. (SEA 32-27)
- PIT – 3:00 Chris Boswell 22-yard Field Goal, Drive: 14 plays, 71 yards, 5:12. (SEA 32–30)
- SEA – 2:01 Doug Baldwin 80-yard pass from Russell Wilson, (Steven Hauschka kick), Drive: 3 plays, 80 yards, 0:59. (SEA 39-30)

Top passers

- PIT – Ben Roethlisberger 36/55, 456 yards, 1 TD, 2 INT
- SEA – Russell Wilson 21/30, 345 yards, 5 TD

Top rushers

- PIT – DeAngelo Williams 8 rushes, 29 yards, 1 TD
- SEA – Thomas Rawls 21 rushes, 81 yards, 1 TD

Top receivers

- PIT – Markus Wheaton 9 rec, 201 yards, 1 TD
- SEA – Doug Baldwin 6 rec, 145 yards, 3 TD

Top tacklers

- PIT – Mike Mitchell 8 tackles
- SEA – Bobby Wagner 12 tackles

Coming off their bye week, the Steelers traveled to Seattle to take on the Seahawks. The Steelers scored first when Chris Boswell kicked a 44-yard field goal for a 3–0 lead for the only score of the period. In the second quarter, the Seahawks were able to take a 7–3 lead when Russell Wilson found Doug Baldwin on a 16-yard pass. The Steelers retook the lead when Martavis Bryant ran for an 11-yard TD for a 10–7 game. Wilson then found Jermaine Kearse on a 12-yard pass for a 14–10 lead. De'Angelo Williams ran for a 6-yard TD (with a successful 2-point conversion) to take an 18–14 lead at halftime. In the third quarter, the Steelers increased their lead when Boswell nailed a 25-yard field goal for a 21–14 lead. The Seahawks would come within 1 when Thomas Rawls made a 1-yard TD run (with a failed PAT) for a 21–20 game. Wilson found Kearse again this time on a 9-yard pass (with a failed 2-point conversion) to move ahead 26–20. The Steelers then retook the lead when Ben Roethlisberger found Bryant on a 69-yard pass (with a failed 2-point conversion) for a 27–26 game. But the Seahawks would move back into the lead when Wilson found Baldwin again this time on a 30-yard pass (with a failed 2-point conversion) for a 32–27 game. The Steelers came within 2 when Boswell nailed a 22-yard field goal for a 32–30 game. But the Seahawks wrapped the game up when Wilson found Baldwin on an 80-yard pass for the final score of 39–30.

With the loss, the Steelers dropped to 6–5 and finished 3-1 against the NFC West.

The defense failed to get any takeaways but sacked Wilson twice.

==== Week 13: vs. Indianapolis Colts ====
Week Thirteen: Indianapolis Colts at Pittsburgh Steelers – Game summary

Quarter	1	2	3	4	Total
Colts	3	7	0	0	10
Steelers	6	15	7	17	45

at Heinz Field, Pittsburgh, Pennsylvania

- Date: December 6
- Game time: 8:30 pm. EST
- Game weather: 37 °F (3 °C), partly cloudy
- Game attendance: 58,701
- Referee: Ron Torbert
- TV announcers (NBC): Al Michaels, Cris Collinsworth and Michele Tafoya
- Recap, Gamebook

Game information

First quarter

- IND – 10:19 Adam Vinatieri 35-yard Field Goal, Drive: 4 plays, 8 yards, 1:59. (IND 3-0)
- PIT – 5:27 Chris Boswell 29-yard Field Goal, Drive: 10 plays, 69 yards, 4:52. (TIE 3-3)
- PIT – 3:15 Chris Boswell 51-yard Field Goal, Drive: 4 plays, 5 yards, 0:49. (PIT 6-3)

Second quarter

- IND – 8:26 Frank Gore 9-yard pass from Matt Hasselbeck, (Adam Vinatieri kick), Drive: 10 plays, 69 yards, 4:52. (IND 10-6)
- PIT - 4:04 Antonio Brown 7-yard pass from Ben Roethlisberger, (2-PT Conversion pass Ben Roethlisberger to Will Johnson), Drive: 10 plays, 8 yards, 4:22. (PIT 14-10)
- PIT - 4:20 Markus Wheaton 5-yard pass from Ben Roethlisberger, (Chris Boswell kick), Drive: 8 plays, 60 yards, 1:38. (PIT 21-10)

Third quarter

- PIT - 12:35 Martavis Bryant 68-yard pass from Ben Roethlisberger, (Chris Boswell kick), Drive: 3 plays, 75 yards, 1:23. (PIT 28-10)

Fourth quarter

- PIT - 14:11 Antonio Brown 5-yard pass from Ben Roethlisberger, (Chris Boswell kick), Drive: 10 plays, 85 yards, 4:23. (PIT 35-10)
- PIT - 6:29 Chris Boswell 42-yard Field Goal, Drive: 11 plays, 54 yards, 6:24. (PIT 38-10)
- PIT - 4:01 Antonio Brown 71-yard Punt Return, (Chris Boswell kick), Drive: 3 plays, 9 yards, 2:28. (PIT 45-10)

Top passers

- IND – Matt Hasselbeck 16/26, 169 yards, 1 TD, 2 INT
- PIT – Ben Roethlisberger 24/39, 364 yards, 4 TD

Top rushers

- IND – Frank Gore 13 rushes, 45 yards
- PIT – DeAngelo Williams 26 rushes, 134 yards

Top receivers

- IND – Frank Gore 3 rec, 49 yards, 1 TD
- PIT – Antonio Brown 8 rec, 118 yards, 2 TD

Top tacklers

- IND – Mike Adams 12 tackles
- PIT – Lawrence Timmons 8 tackles

After a tough road loss, the Steelers returned home. With their record at 6–5, they faced off against the 6–5 Colts in a rematch of 2014's 51–34 blowout win. Adam Vinatieri was able to get the Colts an early 3–0 lead when he kicked a 35-yard field goal. The Steelers would get on the board when Chris Boswell kicked a 29-yard field goal for a 3–3 tie and then move into the lead when he kicked a 51-yard field goal for a 6–3 lead. The Colts retook the lead in the 2nd quarter when Matt Hasselbeck found Frank Gore on a 9-yard pass for a 10–6 game. Though the Steelers responded with 2 straight touchdowns of their own: Ben Roethlisberger found Antonio Brown on a 7-yard pass (with a successful 2-point conversion) retaking the lead 14–10 followed by Roethlisberger finding Markus Wheaten on a 5-yard pass to move ahead 21–10 at halftime. In the second half, it was all Steelers when Roethlisberger found Martavis Bryant on a 68-yard pass for a 28–10 game and only score of the third quarter. In the fourth quarter, Roethlisberger and Brown hooked up again this time on a 5-yard pass for a 35–10 game. Boswell then put a 42-yard field goal through for a 38–10 game. Finally, the Steelers wrapped the scoring up when Brown returned a punt 71 yards for a touchdown making the final score 45–10.

With the win, the Steelers improved to 7–5.

The defense had yet another stellar outing by forcing 3 turnovers and getting 5 sacks (2 on Hasselbeck, 3 on Whitehurst)

==== Week 14: at Cincinnati Bengals ====
Week Fourteen: Pittsburgh Steelers at Cincinnati Bengals – Game summary

Quarter	1	2	3	4	Total
Steelers	7	9	7	10	33
Bengals	0	7	3	10	20

at Paul Brown Stadium, Cincinnati, Ohio

- Date: December 13
- Game time: 1:00 pm. EST
- Game weather: 63 °F (17 °C), cloudy
- Game attendance: 65,564
- Referee: John Parry
- TV announcers (CBS): Greg Gumbel, Trent Green and Jamie Erdahl
- Recap, Gamebook

Game information

First quarter

- PIT– 9:23 DeAngelo Williams 1-yard run, (Chris Boswell kick), Drive: 11 plays, 80 yards, 5:37. (PIT 7-0)

Second quarter

- PIT – 12:33 Chris Boswell 42-yard Field Goal, Drive: 13 plays, 66 yards, 7:27. (PIT 10–0)
- PIT – 7:00 Chris Boswell 47-yard Field Goal, Drive: 8 plays, 27 yards, 3:46. (PIT 13–0)
- CIN – 6:23 A. J. Green 66-yard pass from A. J. McCarron, (Mike Nugent kick), Drive: 2 plays, 80 yards, 0:37. (PIT 13-7)
- PIT – 0:22 Chris Boswell 45-yard Field Goal, Drive: 6 plays, 27 yards, 0:42. (PIT 16–7)

Third quarter

- PIT - 14:10 William Gay 23-yard interception return, (Chris Boswell kick), Drive: 2 plays, 5 yards, 0:50. (PIT 23-7)
- CIN – 10:10 Mike Nugent 46-yard Field Goal, Drive: 9 plays, 40 yards, 4:00. (PIT 23–10)

Fourth quarter

- PIT – 14:56 Chris Boswell 31-yard Field Goal, Drive: 12 plays, 64 yards, 7:04. (PIT 26–10)
- CIN – 10:06 Mike Nugent 27-yard Field Goal, Drive: 10 plays, 71 yards, 4:50. (PIT 26–13)
- PIT– 3:49 DeAngelo Williams 1-yard run, (Chris Boswell kick), Drive: 4 plays, 16 yards, 1:25. (PIT 33-13)
- CIN – 1:03 Rex Burkhead 5-yard pass from A. J. McCarron, (Mike Nugent kick), Drive: 10 plays, 80 yards, 2:46. (PIT 33-20)

Top passers

- PIT – Ben Roethlisberger 30/39, 282 yards, 1 INT
- CIN – A. J. McCarron 22/32, 280 yards, 2 TD, 2 INT

Top rushers

- PIT – DeAngelo Williams 23 rushes, 76 yards, 2 TD
- CIN – Giovani Bernard 6 rushes, 40 yards

Top receivers

- PIT – Antonio Brown 7 rec, 87 yards
- CIN – A. J. Green 6 rec, 132 yards, 1 TD

Top tacklers

- PIT – Lawrence Timmons 8 tackles
- CIN – Vontaze Burfict 11 tackles

After winning at home, the Steelers traveled to Cincinnati for Game 2 against the Bengals. Before the game started there were an altercation between the two teams during warmups. Vince Williams and Vontaze Burfict were in the center of the scuffle. The game began with a score on the very first drive, when DeAngelo Williams ran for a 1-yard TD for a 7–0 lead and would increase their lead in the 2nd quarter, when Chris Boswell went for 2 field goals: From 42 and 47 yards out for 10–0 and 13–0 leads. QB Andy Dalton would be knocked out of the game so backup QB A. J. McCarron came in and threw his first career TD pass to A. J. Green from 66 yards out to make the score 13–7. Boswell, however, wrapped up the scoring of the first half with another 47 yard field goal for a 16–7 lead at halftime. In the third quarter, the Steelers went back to work as William Gay picked off A. J. McCarron and returned it 23 yards for a TD for a 23–7 game. Mike Nugent would kick a 46-yard field goal to make it 23–10. The Steelers went back to work in the fourth quarter when Boswell kicked a 31-yard field goal for a 26–10 game. The Bengals responded with Nugent kicking a 27-yard field goal for a 26–13 game. Later on however, the Steelers would pretty much seal the game when Williams ran for another 1-yard TD for a 33–13 game. The Bengals would wrap up the scoring of the game when McCarron found Rex Burkhead on a 5-yard pass for a 33–20 final score.

With the win, the Steelers improved to 8–5. The defense also stood out and continued their reign of sacks and takeaways with 3 each (picked off Dalton once, picked off McCarron twice).

==== Week 15: vs. Denver Broncos ====
Week Fifteen: Denver Broncos at Pittsburgh Steelers – Game summary

Quarter	1	2	3	4	Total
Broncos	14	13	0	0	27
Steelers	7	6	7	14	34

at Heinz Field, Pittsburgh, Pennsylvania

- Date: December 20
- Game time: 4:25 pm. EST
- Game weather: 41 °F (5 °C), partly cloudy
- Game attendance: 67,234
- Referee: Carl Cheffers
- TV announcers (CBS): Jim Nantz, Phil Simms and Tracy Wolfson
- Recap, Gamebook

Game information

First quarter

- PIT– 10:16 DeAngelo Williams 2-yard run, (Chris Boswell kick), Drive: 2 plays, 21 yards, 0:53. (PIT 7-0)
- DEN – 4:41 Demaryius Thomas 18-yard pass from Brock Osweiler, (Brandon McManus kick), Drive: 12 plays, 85 yards, 5:35. (TIE 7-7)
- DEN – 3:08 Emmanuel Sanders 61-yard pass from Brock Osweiler, (Brandon McManus kick), Drive: 1 play, 61 yards, 0:08. (DEN 14-7)

Second quarter

- DEN– 11:30 Brock Osweiler 7-yard run, (Brandon McManus missed XP), (Drive: 10 plays, 50 yards, 4:53. (DEN 20-7)
- PIT – 7:33 Chris Boswell 24-yard Field Goal, Drive: 12 plays, 73 yards, 3:57. (DEN 20–10)
- DEN – 1:56 Demaryius Thomas 6-yard pass from Brock Osweiler, (Brandon McManus kick), Drive: 10 plays, 80 yards, 5:37. (DEN 27-10)
- PIT – 0:04 Chris Boswell 41-yard Field Goal, Drive: 10 plays, 51 yards, 1:52. (DEN 27–13)

Third quarter

- PIT – 7:16 Antonio Brown 9-yard pass from Ben Roethlisberger, (Chris Boswell kick), Drive: 7 plays, 58 yards, 3:17. (DEN 27-20)

Fourth quarter

- PIT – 12:34 Markus Wheaton 9-yard pass from Ben Roethlisberger, (Chris Boswell kick), Drive: 5 plays, 60 yards, 2:17. (TIE 27-27)
- PIT – 3:24 Antonio Brown 23-yard pass from Ben Roethlisberger, (Chris Boswell kick), Drive: 3 plays, 37 yards, 0:56. (PIT 34-27)

Top passers

- DEN – Brock Osweiler 21/44, 296 yards, 3 TD, 1 INT
- PIT – Ben Roethlisberger 40/55, 380 yards, 3 TD, 2 INT

Top rushers

- DEN – Ronnie Hillman 14 rushes, 48 yards
- PIT – DeAngelo Williams 14 rushes, 26 yards, 1 TD

Top receivers

- DEN – Emmanuel Sanders 10 rec, 181 yards, 1 TD
- PIT – Antonio Brown 16 rec, 189 yards, 2 TD

Top tacklers

- DEN – Aqib Talib 8 tackles
- PIT – Ryan Shazier 6 tackles, 1 INT

The Steelers traveled back home to take on the Broncos. They would score first when D'Angelo Williams ran for a 2-yard TD for a 7–0 lead. Not long before the Broncos scored 20 consecutive points starting with Brock Osweiler's 18-yard pass to Demyarius Thomas to tie the game at 7–7 and then taking the lead when Osweiler found Emmanuel Sanders on a 61-yard pass for a 14–7 lead. In the second quarter, the Broncos increased their lead when Osweiler ran for a 7-yard TD (with a failed PAT) for a 20–7 game. The Steelers would draw closer when Chris Boswell nailed a 24-yard field goal for a 20–10 game. Though, the Broncos moved away when Osweiler found Thomas again on a 6-yard pass for a 27–10 game. The Steelers started their reign of 24 consecutive points: Starting with another field goal from Boswell from 41 yards out to make it 27–13 at halftime. In the third quarter, Ben Roethlisberger found Antonio Brown on a 9-yard pass coming within 7 for the only score of the period, 27–20. In the fourth quarter, the Steelers were able to tie the game up at 27–27 when Roethlisberger found Markus Wheaton on a 9-yard pass. Finally, they wrapped up the scoring when Roethlisberger found Brown again this time on a 23-yard pass for the eventual final score of 34–27.

With the win, the Steelers improved to 9–5 and they finished 6-2 at home and 3-1 against the AFC West.

The defense stood out again as they got 2 takeaways and 2 sacks.

==== Week 16: at Baltimore Ravens ====
Week Sixteen: Pittsburgh Steelers at Baltimore Ravens – Game summary

Quarter	1	2	3	4	Total
Steelers	0	3	7	7	17
Ravens	7	6	0	7	20

at M&T Bank Stadium, Baltimore, Maryland

- Date: December 27
- Game time: 1:00 pm. EST
- Game weather: 64 °F (18 °C), overcast
- Game attendance: 71,261
- Referee: Craig Wrolstad
- TV announcers (CBS): Greg Gumbel, Trent Green and Jamie Erdahl
- Recap, Gamebook

Game information

First quarter

- BAL – 3:53 Chris Matthews 8-yard TD pass from Ryan Mallett, Justin Tucker kick. Drive: 15 plays, 75 yards, 7:07 (BAL 7-0)

Second quarter

- PIT – 14:48 Chris Boswell 34-yard FG. Drive: 10 plays, 64 yards, 4:05 (BAL 7-3)
- BAL – 10:01 Justin Tucker 37-yard FG. Drive: 11 plays, 61 yards, 4:47 (BAL 10-3)
- BAL – 1:17 Justin Tucker 50-yard FG. Drive: 7 plays, 24 yards, 3:21 (BAL 13-3)

Third quarter

- PIT - 11:18 DeAngelo Williams 1-yard TD run, Chris Boswell kick. Drive: 6 plays, 79 yards, 3:01 (BAL 13-10)

Fourth quarter

- BAL - 10:35 Javorius Allen 3-yard TD run, Justin Tucker kick. Drive: 5 plays, 58 yards, 2:20 (BAL 20–10)
- PIT - 6:33 DeAngelo Williams 2-yard TD run, Chris Boswell kick. Drive: 8 plays, 80 yards, 4:02 (BAL 20-17)

Top passers

- PIT – Ben Roethlisberger 24/34, 215 yards, 2 INT
- BAL – Ryan Mallett 28/41, 274 yards, 1 TD

Top rushers

- PIT – DeAngelo Williams 17 rushes, 100 yards, 2 TD
- BAL – Javorius Allen 18 rushes, 79 yards, 1 TD

Top receivers

- PIT – Antonio Brown 7 rec, 61 yards
- BAL – Kamar Aiken 8 rec, 66 yards

Top tacklers

- PIT – Ryan Shazier 13 tackles
- BAL – C.J. Mosley 9 tackles

With the loss, the Steelers fell to 9–6, and were swept by the Ravens for the first time since the 2011 season. They also ended their streak of six straight games scoring 30 or more points. The loss also allowed the Bengals to clinch the AFC North title. The Steelers also fell out of the AFC Wildcard race and would need a win coupled with a loss by the New York Jets in Week 17 in order to make the playoffs.

The defense failed to get any takeaways but were able to get away with 2 sacks.

==== Week 17: at Cleveland Browns ====
Week Seventeen: Pittsburgh Steelers at Cleveland Browns – Game summary

Quarter	1	2	3	4	Total
Steelers	7	7	3	11	28
Browns	3	6	0	3	12

at FirstEnergy Stadium, Cleveland, Ohio

- Date: January 3
- Game time: 1:00 pm. EST
- Game weather: 34 °F (1 °C), cloudy
- Game attendance: 66,693
- Referee: Pete Morelli
- TV announcers (CBS): Greg Gumbel, Trent Green and Jamie Erdahl
- Recap, Gamebook

Game information

First quarter

- PIT – Heath Miller 2-yard pass from Ben Roethlisberger (Chris Boswell kick), 7:12. Steelers 7–0. Drive: 8 plays, 70 yards, 4:18.
- CLE – Travis Coons 29-yard field goal, 1:15. Steelers 7–3. Drive: 6 plays, 13 yards, 2:10.

Second quarter

- CLE – Travis Coons 39-yard field goal, 2:00. Steelers 7–6. Drive: 11 plays, 31 yards, 5:18.
- PIT – Antonio Brown 17-yard pass from Ben Roethlisberger (Chris Boswell kick), 1:02. Steelers 14–6. Drive: 6 plays, 80 yards, 0:58.
- CLE – Travis Coons 33-yard field goal, 0:03. Steelers 14–9. Drive: 9 plays, 65 yards, 0:58.

Third quarter

- PIT – Chris Boswell 39-yard field goal, 9:43. Steelers 17–9. Drive: 7 plays, 74 yards, 2:33.

Fourth quarter

- CLE – Travis Coons 29-yard field goal, 14:57. Steelers 17–12. Drive: 17 plays, 62 yards, 9:46.
- PIT – Markus Wheaton 8-yard pass from Ben Roethlisberger (Ben Roethlisberger-Fitzgerald Toussaint pass), 10:49. Steelers 25–12. Drive: 1 play, 8 yards, 0:06.
- PIT – Chris Boswell 21-yard field goal, 2:57. Steelers 28–12. Drive: 6 plays, 25 yards, 2:57.

Top passers

- PIT – Ben Roethlisberger – 24/36, 349 yards, 3 TD, 2 INT
- CLE – Austin Davis – 24/46, 240 yards, 2 INT

Top rushers

- PIT – Fitzgerald Toussaint – 12 rushes, 24 yards
- CLE – Isaiah Crowell – 15 rushes, 53 yards

Top receivers

- PIT – Antonio Brown – 13 receptions, 187 yards, TD
- CLE – Gary Barnidge – 8 receptions, 66 yards

Top tacklers

- PIT – Lawrence Timmons – 7 tackles, 3 assists (1.5 sacks), 1 forced fumble
- CLE – Karlos Dansby – 5 tackles, 2 assists, 1 forced fumble

After getting swept by the Ravens, the Steelers traveled to Cleveland for Round 2 against the Browns. They would score early in the first quarter when Ben Roethlisberger found Heath Miller on a 2-yard pass for a 7–0 lead. The Browns scored later on in the quarter when Travis Coons nailed a 29-yard field goal for a 7–3 game. The Browns were able to shorten the lead to 1 point when Coons nailed another field goal in the second quarter from 39 yards out for a 7–6 game. The Steelers however went back to work as Roethlisberger found Antonio Brown on a 17-yard pass for a 14–6 game. The Browns wrapped up the scoring of the first half when Coons nailed a 33-yard field goal for a 14–9 game. In the third quarter, Chris Boswell nailed a 39-yard field goal for the only score of the period moving up 17–9. In the fourth quarter, the Browns drew closer when Coons got another 29-yard field goal for a 17–12 game. But later on, the Steelers were able to seal the game when Roethlisberger found Markus Wheaton on an 8-yard pass (with a successful 2-point conversion) for a 25–12 game. Finally, they sealed the deal with Boswell's 21-yard field goal for the final score 28–12.

With the win, and the Jets loss to Buffalo, the Steelers finished 10-6 (3-3 against the AFC North and 4-4 on the road) and they clinched the #6 in the AFC.

The defense stood out by getting 4 turnovers and 7 sacks.

=== Postseason ===
==== AFC Wild Card Playoffs: at #3 Cincinnati Bengals ====
AFC Wild Card Playoffs: #6 Pittsburgh Steelers at #3 Cincinnati Bengals – Game summary

Quarter	1	2	3	4	Total
Steelers	0	6	9	3	18
Bengals	0	0	0	16	16

at Paul Brown Stadium, Cincinnati, Ohio

- Date: January 9
- Game time: 8:15 p.m. EST
- Game weather: 51 °F (11 °C), light drizzle
- Game attendance: 63,257
- Referee: John Parry
- TV announcers (CBS): Jim Nantz, Phil Simms and Tracy Wolfson
- Recap, Gamebook

Game information

First quarter

- None

Second quarter

- PIT – 2:32 Chris Boswell 39-yard FG. Drive: 6 plays, 20 yards, 2:30. (PIT 3-0)
- PIT – 0:37 Chris Boswell 30-yard FG. Drive: 10 plays, 63 yards, 1:16. (PIT 6-0)

Third quarter

- PIT – 10:09 Chris Boswell 34-yard FG. Drive: 5 plays, 46 yards, 2:04. (PIT 9-0)
- PIT – 5:02 Martavis Bryant 10-yard pass from Ben Roethlisberger, (2-point pass attempt failed.) Drive: 6 plays, 82 yards, 3:29. (PIT 15-0)

Fourth quarter

- CIN – 13:57 Jeremy Hill 1-yard run, (Mike Nugent kick.) Drive: 3 plays, 46 yards, 0:50. (PIT 15-7)
- CIN – 5:12 Mike Nugent 36-yard FG. Drive: 13 plays, 70 yards, 5:59. (PIT 15-10)
- CIN – 1:50 A. J. Green 25-yard pass from A. J. McCarron, (2-point run attempt failed.) Drive: 7 plays, 45 yards, 1:38. (CIN 16-15)
- PIT – 0:14 Chris Boswell 35-yard FG. Drive: 9 plays, 74 yards, 1:09. (PIT 18-16)

Top passers

- PIT – Ben Roethlisberger – 18/32, 229 yards, TD
- CIN – A. J. McCarron – 23/40, 212 yards, TD, INT

Top rushers

- PIT – Jordan Todman – 11 rushes, 65 yards
- CIN – Jeremy Hill – 12 rushes, 50 yards, TD

Top receivers

- PIT – Antonio Brown – 7 rec, 119 yards
- CIN – A. J. Green – 5 rec, 71 yards, TD

Top tacklers

- PIT – Ryan Shazier 13 tackles, 2 forced fumbles
- CIN – Rey Maualuga 10 tackles

The Cincinnati Bengals' playoff losing streak of 8 straight games nearly came to an end on Saturday. After trailing 15–0 in the fourth quarter the Bengals took a 16–15 lead late in the game, but a last-minute field-goal drive led to an 18–16 win for the Pittsburgh Steelers. The winning score was set up by back-to-back personal foul penalties against the Bengals.

Ben Roethlisberger (shoulder) and Antonio Brown (concussion) both left the game with injuries and both teams were penalized a combined 18 times for 221 yards. "Big Ben" did re-enter the game with 1:43 remaining in the fourth quarter to lead the Steelers into field goal range for the winning score.

With the win, Pittsburgh moved on to face the No. 1 seed Denver Broncos in the Divisional round at Mile High Stadium.

==== AFC Divisional Playoffs: at #1 Denver Broncos ====
AFC Divisional Playoffs: #6 Pittsburgh Steelers at #1 Denver Broncos – Game summary

Quarter	1	2	3	4	Total
Steelers	7	3	3	3	16
Broncos	6	3	3	11	23

at Sports Authority Field at Mile High, Denver, Colorado

- Date: January 17
- Game time: 4:40 pm. EST/2:40 p.m. MST
- Game weather: 43 °F (6 °C), sunny
- Game attendance: 76,956
- Referee: Terry McAulay
- TV announcers (CBS): Jim Nantz, Phil Simms and Tracy Wolfson
- Recap, Gamebook

Game information

First quarter

- DEN – Brandon McManus 28-yard field goal, 11:21. Broncos 3–0. Drive: 5 plays, 20 yards, 1:57.
- DEN – Brandon McManus 41-yard field goal, 3:40. Broncos 6–0. Drive: 4 plays, 8 yards, 1:26.
- PIT – Fitzgerald Toussaint 1-yard run (Chris Boswell kick), 1:22. Steelers 7–6. Drive: 5 plays, 80 yards, 2:18.

Second quarter

- PIT – Chris Boswell 43-yard field goal, 10:19. Steelers 10–6. Drive: 7 plays, 60 yards, 3:53.
- DEN – Brandon McManus 51-yard field goal, 0:00. Steelers 10–9. Drive: 11 plays, 62 yards, 3:14.

Third quarter

- PIT – Chris Boswell 28-yard field goal, 9:32. Steelers 13–9. Drive: 8 plays, 69 yards, 2:19.
- DEN – Brandon McManus 41-yard field goal, 2:45. Steelers 13–12. Drive: 7 plays, 30 yards, 3:08.

Fourth quarter

- DEN – C. J. Anderson 1-yard run (2-pt conv. – Peyton Manning pass to Demaryius Thomas), 3:00. Broncos 20–13. Drive: 13 plays, 65 yards, 6:52.
- DEN – Brandon McManus 45-yard field goal, 0:53. Broncos 23–13. Drive: 4 plays, 3 yards, 0:56.
- PIT – Chris Boswell 47-yard field goal, 0:19. Broncos 23–16. Drive: 4 plays, 51 yards, 0:34.

Top passers

- PIT – Ben Roethlisberger – 24/37, 339 yards
- DEN – Peyton Manning – 21/37, 222 yards

Top rushers

- PIT – Martavis Bryant – 2 rushes, 40 yards
- DEN – C. J. Anderson – 15 rushes, 72 yards, TD

Top receivers

- PIT – Martavis Bryant – 9 rec, 154 yards
- DEN – Emmanuel Sanders – 5 rec, 85 yards

After the tough battle against the Bengals, the Steelers moved on to face the #1 seeded Broncos. The Broncos would score early when Brandon McManus nailed a 28-yard field goal for a 3–0 lead. Later on in the quarter, he would kick a 41-yard field goal for a 6–0 lead. The Steelers took the lead later on in the quarter when Fitzgerald Touissaint ran for a 1-yard TD and a 7–6 game. In the second quarter, the Steelers increased their lead as Chris Boswell kicked a 45-yard field goal for a 10–6 game. But the Broncos came within a point when McManus kicked a 51-yard field goal for a 10–9 game at halftime. Both teams would get off to slow starts with field goals in the third quarter: The Steelers moved ahead by 4 when Boswell nailed one from 28 yards out for a 13–9 game. This was followed up by the Broncos coming within a point again when McManus kicked a 41-yard field goal for a 13–12 game. In the fourth quarter, the Broncos took the lead when C.J. Anderson ran for a 1-yard TD (with a successful 2-point conversion) for a 20–13 game. This was followed up by McManus kicking a 45-yard field goal for a 23–13 game. The Steelers wrapped the scoring up coming within 7 when Boswell nailed a 47-yard field goal for the final score of 23–16.

After the game, sources said that Steelers coach Mike Tomlin was sobbing in the locker room following the loss. Wide receiver Martavis Bryant stated that he had "never seen him (coach Tomlin) cry before."

Despite the season-ending loss to Denver, of the Broncos' three postseason opponents en route to their Super Bowl title, Ben Roethlisberger was the only quarterback to not throw an interception against Denver's top-ranked "No Fly Zone" defense, while Tom Brady threw two interceptions in the AFC Championship Game and Cam Newton threw one pick in Super Bowl 50. The Steelers also committed just one turnover against the Broncos, compared to the New England Patriots committing two in the AFC Title Game and the Carolina Panthers turning it over four times in the Super Bowl. Pittsburgh also gained the most amount of total yards on offense with 396, with New England and Carolina recording 336 and 315 yards respectively, and also the greatest number of passing yards with 311, compared to the Patriots managing 229 yards through the air and the Panthers with 197 passing yards.

With the loss, the Steelers season ended with an overall record of 11–7.

== Standings ==
=== Division ===
AFC North
	W	L	T	PCT	DIV	CONF	PF	PA	STK
^{(3)} Cincinnati Bengals	12	4	0	.750	5–1	9–3	419	279	W1
^{(6)} Pittsburgh Steelers	10	6	0	.625	3–3	7–5	423	319	W1
Baltimore Ravens	5	11	0	.313	3–3	4–8	328	401	L1
Cleveland Browns	3	13	0	.188	1–5	2–10	278	432	L3

=== Conference ===
AFC
#	Team	Division	W	L	T	PCT	DIV	CONF	SOS	SOV	STK
Division Leaders
1 (Note: Denver finished ahead of New England and Cincinnati for the No. 1 seed based on head-to-head sweep. New England finished ahead of Cincinnati for the No. 2 seed based on record vs. common opponents — New England's cumulative record against Buffalo, Denver, Houston and Pittsburgh was 4–1, while Cincinnati's cumulative record against the same four teams was 2–3.)	Denver Broncos	West	12	4	0	.750	4–2	8–4	.500	.479	W2
2	New England Patriots	East	12	4	0	.750	4–2	9–3	.473	.448	L2
3	Cincinnati Bengals	North	12	4	0	.750	5–1	9–3	.477	.406	W1
4	Houston Texans	South	9	7	0	.563	5–1	7–5	.496	.410	W3
Wild Cards
5	Kansas City Chiefs	West	11	5	0	.688	5–1	10–2	.496	.432	W10
6 (Note: Pittsburgh finished ahead of the New York Jets for the No. 6 seed and qualified for the last playoff spot based on record vs. common opponents — Pittsburgh's cumulative record against Cleveland, Indianapolis, New England and Oakland was 4–1, while the Jets' cumulative record against the same four teams was 3–2.)	Pittsburgh Steelers	North	10	6	0	.625	3–3	7–5	.504	.463	W1
Did not qualify for the postseason
7	New York Jets	East	10	6	0	.625	3–3	7–5	.441	.388	L1
8 (Note: Buffalo finished ahead of Indianapolis based on head-to-head victory.)	Buffalo Bills	East	8	8	0	.500	4–2	7–5	.508	.438	W2
9	Indianapolis Colts	South	8	8	0	.500	4–2	6–6	.500	.406	W2
10	Oakland Raiders	West	7	9	0	.438	3–3	7–5	.512	.366	L1
11	Miami Dolphins	East	6	10	0	.375	1–5	4–8	.469	.469	W2
12 (Note: Jacksonville finished ahead of Baltimore based on head-to-head victory.)	Jacksonville Jaguars	South	5	11	0	.313	2–4	5–7	.473	.375	L3
13	Baltimore Ravens	North	5	11	0	.313	3–3	4–8	.508	.425	L1
14	San Diego Chargers	West	4	12	0	.250	0–6	3–9	.527	.328	L2
15 (Note: Cleveland finished ahead of Tennessee based on head-to-head victory.)	Cleveland Browns	North	3	13	0	.188	1–5	2–10	.531	.271	L3
16	Tennessee Titans	South	3	13	0	.188	1–5	1–11	.492	.375	L4
Tiebreakers (Note: When breaking ties for three or more teams under the NFL's rules, they are first broken within divisions, then comparing only the highest ranked remaining team from each division.)

== Statistics ==
Updated January 4, 2016

=== Team ===
	Pittsburgh	Opponent
Total First Downs	331	327
Rushing First Downs	91	71
Passing First Downs	207	231
By Penalty First Downs	33	25
Third Down Conversions	75/193	90/225
Fourth Down Conversions	4/12	7/24
Total Offensive Yards	6,327	5,809
Offensive Plays	1,004	1,052
Average Yards per Play	6.3	5.5
Total Rushing Yards	1,724	1,459
Rushing Plays	388	382
Rushing Yards per Play	4.4	3.8
Total Passing Yards	4,822	4,661
Passing Completions/Attempts	391/590	402/625
Interceptions	21	17
Passing Yards per Play	8.2	7.5
Sacks	48.0	33.0
Field Goals	35/42	26/31
Touchdowns	45	35
Rushing Touchdowns	16	6
Passing Touchdowns	26	29
Return Touchdowns	1	0
Defensive Touchdowns	2	0
Time of Possession	29:43	30:54
Turnover Ratio	+2	

=== Passing ===
Regular season
Player	ATT	COMP	YDS	COMP %	YDS/ATT	TD	TD %	INT	INT %	LONG	SCK	LOST	RATING
Ben Roethlisberger	469	319	3,938	68.0	8.4	21	4.5	16	3.4	69	20	141	94.5
Landry Jones	55	32	513	58.2	9.3	3	5.5	4	7.3	88	2	17	77.3
Michael Vick	66	40	371	60.6	5.6	2	3.0	1	1.5	72	10	53	79.8

=== Rushing ===
Regular season
Player	ATT	YDS	YDS/ATT	LONG	TD
DeAngelo Williams	200	907	4.5	55	11
Le'Veon Bell	113	556	4.9	42	3
Michael Vick	20	99	5.0	24	0
Fitzgerald Toussaint	18	42	2.3	7	0
Martavis Bryant	5	37	7.4	13	1
Ben Roethlisberger	15	29	1.9	13	0
Antonio Brown	3	28	9.3	16	0
Jordan Todman	4	22	5.5	11	0
Will Johnson	4	7	1.8	6	1
Heath Miller	1	2	2.0	2	0
Landry Jones	5	−5	−1.0	0	0
Total	388	1,724	4.4	55	16

=== Receiving ===
Regular season
Player	ATT	YDS	YDS/REC	LONG	TD
Antonio Brown	136	1,834	13.5	59	10
Heath Miller	60	535	8.9	27	2
Martavis Bryant	50	765	15.3	88	6
Markus Wheaton	44	749	17.0	72	5
DeAngelo Williams	40	367	9.2	34	0
Le'Veon Bell	24	136	5.7	20	0
Darrius Heyward-Bey	21	314	15.0	66	2
Jesse James	8	56	7.0	20	1
Matt Spaeth	2	10	5.0	6	0
Will Johnson	2	16	8.0	11	0
Roosevelt Nix	3	33	11.0	17	0
Tyler Murphy	1	16	16.0	16	0
Sammie Coates	1	11	11.0	11	0
Total	391	4,825	12.3	88	26

=== Field Goals ===
Regular season
Player	1–19	20–29	30–39	40–49	50+
Chris Boswell	1/1	9/9	8/8	12/9	2/2
Josh Scobee	0/0	2/2	1/1	7/3	0/0
Total	1/1	11/11	9/9	19/12	2/2
Opponent Total	0/0	7/7	7/7	11/9	6/3

=== Punting ===
Regular season
Player	Punts	AVG	TB	In 20	LONG	BLK
Jordan Berry	59	42.6	2	28	79	0
Total	59	42.6	2	28	79	0
Opponent Total	70	43.8	6	23	67	0

=== Punt Returns ===
Regular season
Player	RT	FC	YDS/RET	LONG	TD
Antonio Brown	22	13	9.6	71	1
Jacoby Jones	6	4	3.2	14	0
Total	28	17	8.2	71	1
Opponent Total	19	21	8.7	25	0

=== Kick Returns ===
Regular season
Player	RT	YDS	YDS/RET	LONG	TD
Dri Archer	14	354	25.3	38	0
Jacoby Jones	9	220	24.4	36	0
Markus Wheaton	5	105	21.0	28	0
Jordan Todman	1	22	22.0	22	0
Total	29	701	24.2	38	0
Opponent Total	54	1,200	22.2	60	0

=== Defense ===
Regular season
Player	T	S	A	SCK	F
Lawrence Timmons	119	77	42	5.0	1
Ryan Shazier	87	55	32	3.5	2
Will Allen	80	62	18	4.0	1
Mike Mitchell	80	58	22	0.0	2
Antwon Blake	76	64	12	1.0	1
William Gay	58	46	12	1.0	0
Stephon Tuitt	54	39	15	6.5	0
Cameron Heyward	54	39	15	7.0	1
Vince Williams	46	34	12	0.5	0
Ross Cockrell	44	34	10	0.0	1
Robert Golden	40	30	10	0.0	0
James Harrison	40	27	13	5.0	2
Sean Spence	37	29	8	1.0	0
Arthur Moats	35	24	11	4.0	0
Jarvis Jones	29	15	14	2.0	1
Bud Dupree	26	17	9	4.0	0
Brandon Boykin	25	20	5	1.0	1
Steve McLendon	14	11	3	1.0	0
Shamarko Thomas	12	10	2	0.0	0
Cam Thomas	11	9	2	0.0	0
Terence Garvin	9	8	1	0.0	0
Roosevelt Nix	9	7	2	0.0	0
Dan McCullers	8	4	4	0.5	0
Darrius Heyward-Bey	6	5	1	0.0	0
Anthony Chickillo	6	4	2	0.0	1
Cortez Allen	6	3	3	0.0	0
Antonio Brown	5	5	0	0.0	0
Will Johnson	4	3	1	0.0	0
Jordan Todman	4	2	2	0.0	0
Martavis Bryant	3	3	0	0.0	0
Heath Miller	3	3	0	0.0	0
Ross Ventrone	3	2	1	0.0	0
Ramon Foster	2	2	0	0.0	0
David DeCastro	2	2	0	0.0	0
Fitzgerald Toussaint	2	2	0	0.0	0
DeAngelo Williams	2	2	0	0.0	0
Chris Boswell	2	2	0	0.0	0
Le'Veon Bell	1	1	0	0.0	0
Jordan Berry	1	1	0	0.0	0
Markus Wheaton	1	1	0	0.0	0
Alejandro Villanueva	1	1	0	0	0
Total	1,079	795	284	48.0	16
Opponent Total	1,011	763	248	33.0	11

=== Interceptions ===
Regular season
Player	INT	YDS	YDS/INT	LONG	TD
Mike Mitchell	3	16	5.3	9	0
Antwon Blake	2	112	56.0	70	1
William Gay	2	30	15.0	23	1
Ross Cockrell	2	62	31.0	37	0
Lawrence Timmons	1	0	0.0	0	0
Will Allen	1	20	20.0	20	0
Ryan Shazier	1	0	0.0	0	0
Stephon Tuitt	1	3	3.0	3	0
Robert Golden	1	27	27.0	27	0
James Harrison	1	6	6.0	6	0
Brandon Boykin	1	1	1.0	1	0
Jarvis Jones	1	5	5.0	5	0
Total	17	282	16.6	70	2
Opponent Total	21	241	11.5	54	0

== Transactions ==
The Steelers have been involved in the following transactions during the 2015 season:

=== Trades ===
Player	Acquired from	Traded to	Date	Trade terms
CB Brandon Boykin	Philadelphia Eagles		August 1, 2015	2016 Conditional 5th Rd. pick
K Josh Scobee	Jacksonville Jaguars		August 31, 2015	2016 6th Rd. pick
P Brad Wing		New York Giants	September 4, 2015	2016 Conditional 7th Rd. pick

=== Free agents ===
Player	Acquired from	Lost to	Date	Contract terms
CB Brice McCain		Miami Dolphins	March 11, 2015	2-year/$5.5 million
RB DeAngelo Williams	Carolina Panthers		March 13, 2015	2-year/$4 million

=== Waivers ===
Player	Claimed from	Lost to	Date
LS Brandon Hartson	Kansas City Chiefs		April 17, 2015
WR Devin Gardner	New England Patriots		May 19, 2015
DE Ray Hamilton	Dallas Cowboys		August 6, 2015
ILB L. J. Fort	New England Patriots		August 19, 2015
DE Caushaud Lyons	Tampa Bay Buccaneers		September 6, 2015
WR Jacoby Jones	San Diego Chargers		November 11, 2015

=== Signings ===
Player	Date	Contract terms
TE Rob Blanchflower	January 5, 2015	1 year/$435,000 (Reserve/Future)
CB Kevin Fogg	January 5, 2015	1 year/$435,000 (Reserve/Future)
WR C.J. Goodwin	January 5, 2015	1 year/$435,000 (Reserve/Future)
DE Ethan Hemer	January 5, 2015	1 year/$435,000 (Reserve/Future)
OLB Howard Jones	January 5, 2015	1 year/$1.1 million (Reserve/Future)
NT Joe Kruger	January 5, 2015	1 year/$435,000 (Reserve/Future)
T Alejandro Villanueva	January 5, 2015	2-year/$960,000 (Reserve/Future)
SS Jordan Dangerfield	January 8, 2015	1 year/$435,000 (Future/Reserve)
WR L'Damian Washington	January 8, 2015	1 year/$435,000 (Future/Reserve)
WR Brelan Chancellor	January 9, 2015	1 year/$435,000 (Future/Reserve)
DE Matthew Conrath	January 9, 2015	1 year/$585,000 (Reserve/Future)
FS Alden Darby	January 9, 2015	1 year/$435,000 (Reserve/Future)
TE Michael Egnew	January 9, 2015	1 year/$585,000 (Reserve/Future)
FB Roosevelt Nix	January 9, 2015	1 year/$435,000 (Reserve/Future)
ILB Terence Garvin	January 9, 2015	1 year/$585,000 (Reserve/Future)
G Chris Hubbard	January 12, 2015	1-year extension/$510,000
FS Isaiah Lewis	January 14, 2015	1 year/$435,000 (Reserve/Future)
T Mitchell Van Dyk	January 15, 2015	1 year/$435,000 (Reserve/Future)
OLB Shawn Lemon	January 19, 2015	3-year/$3.582 million (Reserve/Future)
P Brad Wing	January 23, 2015	1-year extension/$510,000
P Richie Leone	January 27, 2015	1 year/$435,000 (Reserve/Future)
SS Ian Wild	January 31, 2015	1 year/$435,000 (Reserve/Future)
LS Greg Warren	February 4, 2015	1-year extension/$1.05 million
QB Tajh Boyd	March 6, 2015	1 year/$435,000
OLB Arthur Moats	March 9, 2015	3-year extension/$7.5 million
TE Matt Spaeth	March 9, 2015	2-year extension/$2.2 million
QB Ben Roethlisberger	March 13, 2015	5-year extension/$99 million
OLB James Harrison	March 22, 2015	2 years/$2.75 million
WR Darrius Heyward-Bey	March 26, 2015	1 year/$825,000
DE Clifton Geathers	April 1, 2015	1 year/$825,000
OLB Shayon Green	April 2, 2015	3 years/$1.575 million
CB Antwon Blake	April 3, 2015	1 year/$1.542 million
FS Will Allen	April 10, 2015	1 year/$1.05 million
P Jordan Berry	April 14, 2015	3 years/$1.575 million
LS Brandon Hartson	April 17, 2015	2 years/$960,000
FB Will Johnson	April 20, 2015	1 year/$1.542 million
FS Robert Golden	April 29, 2015	1 year/$1.542 million
TE Cameron Clear	May 2, 2015	3 years/$1.575 million
NT Nigel Crawford-Kinney	May 2, 2015	3 years/$1.575 million
DE Dominique Davis	May 2, 2015	3 years/$1.575 million
G Miles Dieffenbach	May 2, 2015	3 years/$1.575 million
G Reese Dismukes	May 2, 2015	3 years/$1.575 million
G B.J. Finney	May 2, 2015	3 years/$1.575 million
WR Tyler Murphy	May 2, 2015	3 years/$1.579 million
DE Bradon Prate	May 2, 2015	3 years/$1.576 million
WR Eli Rogers	May 2, 2015	3 years/$1.575 million
RB Ross Scheuerman	May 2, 2015	3 years/$1.575 million
T Kevin Whimpey	May 2, 2015	3 years/$1.575 million
T Micah Hatchie	May 4, 2015	3 years/$1.575 million
NT L. T. Walton	May 8, 2015	4 years/$2.397 million
CB Doran Grant	May 11, 2015	4 years/$2.769 million
OLB Anthony Chickillo	May 11, 2015	4 years/$2.370 million
RB Cameron Stingily	May 11, 2015	3 years/$1.575 million
NT Mike Thornton	May 11, 2015	3 years/$1.575 million
CB Senquez Golson	May 12, 2015	4 years/$4.001 million
CB Shakim Phillips	May 12, 2015	3 years/$1.575 million
TE Jesse James	May 14, 2015	4 years/$2.489 million
OLB Bud Dupree	May 14, 2015	4 years/$9.222 million
WR Sammie Coates	May 15, 2015	4 years/$3 million
WR Devin Gardner	May 19, 2015	3 years/$1.580 million
FS Gerod Holliman	May 30, 2015	4 years/$2.338 million
DE Cam Heyward	July 16, 2015	6-year extension/$59.25 million
T Kelvin Palmer	July 25, 2015	1 year/$435,000
CB Jordan Sullen	July 30, 2015	1 year/$435,000
RB Jawon Chisholm	August 2, 2015	3 years/$1.575 million
TE Ray Hamilton	August 6, 2015	3 years/$1.577 million
DE Joe Okafor	August 7, 2015	3 years/$1.575 million
SS Jordan Dangerfield	August 8, 2015	1 year/$435,000
K Garrett Hartley	August 11, 2015	1 year/$870,000
RB Braylon Heard	August 12, 2015	3 years/$1.575 million
WR David Nelson	August 12, 2015	1 year/$745,000
WR Jarrod West	August 18, 2015	1 year/$435,000
ILB L. J. Fort	August 19, 2015	1 year/$510,000
C Doug Legursky	August 25, 2015	1 year/$745,000
QB Michael Vick	August 25, 2015	1 year/$970,000
CB Ross Cockrell	September 5, 2015	1 year/$435,000
RB Dominique Brown	September 6, 2015	Practice Squad
SS Jordan Dangerfield	September 6, 2015	Practice Squad
C Reese Dismukes	September 6, 2015	Practice Squad
ILB L. J. Fort	September 6, 2015	Practice Squad
OLB Shayon Green	September 6, 2015	Practice Squad
DE Ethan Hemer	September 6, 2015	Practice Squad
T Antonio Johnson	September 6, 2015	Practice Squad
WR Shakim Phillips	September 6, 2015	Practice Squad
TE Harold Spears	September 6, 2015	Practice Squad
WR Jarod West	September 6, 2015	Practice Squad
RB Jordan Todman	September 7, 2015	1 year/$745,000
C Doug Legursky	September 6, 2015	1 year/$745,000
WR Isaiah Burse	September 7, 2015	Practice Squad
T Matt Feiler	September 7, 2015	Practice Squad
TE Xavier Grimble	September 7, 2015	Practice Squad
RB Fitzgerald Toussaint	September 7, 2015	Practice Squad
C Barrett Jones	September 7, 2015	Practice Squad
OLB Anthony Chickillo	September 7, 2015	Practice Squad
CB Doran Grant	September 7, 2015	Practice Squad
CB Doran Grant	September 7, 2015	Practice Squad
WR Tyler Murphy	September 24, 2015	Practice Squad
G B.J. Finney	September 29, 2015	Practice Squad
K Chris Boswell	October 3, 2015	2 years/$1.1 million
T Byron Stingily	October 19, 2015	1 year/$660,000
CB Isaiah Frey	October 27, 2015	Practice Squad
RB Isaiah Pead	November 2, 2015	1 year/$660,000
CB Doran Grant	November 4, 2015	1 year/$435,000
WR Tyler Murphy	November 5, 2015	Practice Squad
RB Rajion Neal	December 1, 2015	Practice Squad
SS Ross Ventrone	December 29, 2015	Practice Squad
RB Abou Toure	January 5, 2016	Practice Squad

=== Cuts ===
Player	Date
WR Lance Moore	March 2, 2015
DE Brett Keisel	March 9, 2015
WR Brelan Chancellor	May 9, 2015
LS Brandon Hartson	May 9, 2015
NT Nigel Crawford-Kinney	May 11, 2015
DE Bradon Prate	May 11, 2015
P Richie Leone	May 11, 2015
SS Jordan Dangerfield	July 25, 2015
WR Devin Gardner	July 25, 2015
QB Tajh Boyd	August 18, 2015
G Miles Dieffenbach	August 31, 2015
WR Kenzel Doe	August 31, 2015
WR C.J. Goodwin	August 31, 2015
RB Braylon Heard	August 31, 2015
NT Joe Kruger	August 31, 2015
NT Joe Okafor	August 31, 2015
G Collin Rahrig	August 31, 2015
CB Jordan Sullen	August 31, 2015
T Kevin Whimpey	August 31, 2015
SS Ian Wild	August 31, 2015
RB Jawon Chisholm	September 4, 2015
CB Kevin Fogg	September 4, 2015
ILB L. J. Fort	September 4, 2015
DE Ethan Hemer	September 4, 2015
OLB Howard Jones	September 4, 2015
WR Shakim Phillips	September 4, 2015
NT Mike Thornton	September 4, 2015
WR Jarrod West	September 4, 2015
DE Matt Conrath	September 5, 2015
SS Jordan Dangerfield	September 5, 2015
FS Alden Darby	September 5, 2015
G Reese Dismukes	September 5, 2015
G B.J. Finney	September 5, 2015
OLB Shayon Green	September 5, 2015
RB Josh Harris	September 5, 2015
FS Gerod Holliman	September 5, 2015
C Doug Legursky	September 5, 2015
CB B. W. Webb	September 5, 2015
OLB Anthony Chickillo	September 6, 2015
CB Doran Grant	September 6, 2015
RB Dominique Brown	September 7, 2015
T Antonio Johnson	September 7, 2015
TE Harold Spears	September 7, 2015
WR Jarrod West	September 7, 2015
C Reese Dismukes	September 7, 2015
OLB Shayon Green	September 7, 2015
DE Ethan Hemer	September 7, 2015
WR Tyler Murphy	September 23, 2015
WR Isaiah Burse	September 24, 2015
C Barrett Jones	September 29, 2015
DE Caushaud Lyons	September 30, 2015
K Josh Scobee	October 3, 2015
SS Ross Ventrone	October 13, 2015
WR Tyler Murphy	November 3, 2015
RB Dri Archer	November 5, 2015
RB Isaiah Pead	November 27, 2015
WR Jacoby Jones	January 2, 2016

=== Other ===
Name	Date	Details
Dick LeBeau	January 10, 2015	Resigned as defensive coordinator
Keith Butler	January 13, 2015	Promoted to defensive coordinator
Jerry Olsavsky	February 6, 2015	Promoted to inside linebackers coach
Joey Porter	February 6, 2015	Promoted to outside linebackers coach
FS Ryan Clark	February 18, 2015	Retired
OLB Jason Worilds	March 10, 2015	Retired
SS Troy Polamalu	April 9, 2015	Retired
CB Ike Taylor	April 14, 2015	Retired
Ron Hughes	May 5, 2015	Retired as College Scouting Coordinator
Rick Reiprish	May 16, 2015	Hired as Senior Assistant, College Scouting
Steve Meyer	May 26, 2015	Promoted to coaching assistant
Mike Tomlin	July 23, 2015	Signed 2-year extension as head coach
Kevin Colbert	July 25, 2015	Signed 2-year extension as general manager
