= Tyler Murphy =

American football player (born 1992)

No. 16
- Position: Wide receiver

Personal information
- Born: January 12, 1992 (age 34); Wethersfield, Connecticut, U.S.
- Listed height: 6 ft 2 in (1.88 m)
- Listed weight: 213 lb (97 kg)

Career information
- High school: Wethersfield
- College: Florida (2010–2013); Boston College (2014)
- NFL draft: 2015: undrafted

Career history
- Pittsburgh Steelers (2015); Miami Dolphins (2016)*; Orlando Apollos (2019)
- * Offseason or practice squad member only

Career NFL statistics
- Receptions: 1
- Receiving yards: 16
- Stats at Pro Football Reference

Tyler Murphy (born January 12, 1992) is an American former professional football player who was a wide receiver in the National Football League (NFL). He played college football as a quarterback for the Florida Gators and Boston College Eagles.

== Early life ==
Murphy attended Wethersfield High School, where he was a two-sport star in football and track. He did not have a very good junior season and was not on the radar for any Division I colleges. His senior year, he had a breakout year and threw for over 1,000 yards and rushed for over 1,000 yards.

Also a standout track & field athlete, Murphy was one of the state's top performers in both sprinting and jumping events. He recorded a personal-best time of 37.12 seconds in the 300-meter dash at the 2010 Yale T&F Classic, where he placed 12th. At the 2010 CCC North Outdoor T&F Championships, he captured two state titles, winning the triple jump, with a leap of 15.53 meters (50 ft, 7 in), and the high jump, with a leap of 1.84 meters (6 ft), while also anchoring the Wethersfield 4 × 400 m relay squad, helping them take silver with a time of 3:24.69 minutes. In addition, Murphy also competed as a middle-distance runner and decathlete, recording career-best times of 1:26.20 minutes in the 600-meter run, 2:00.24 minutes in the 800-meter run and 2:38.33 minutes in the 1000-meter run.

=== Recruiting ===
Regarded only as a two-star prospect by Rivals.com, Murphy signed to Florida on February 3, 2010.

College recruiting
Name	Hometown	School	Height	Weight	Commit date	
Tyler Murphy; Quarterback	Wethersfield	Wethersfield	6 ft 2 in (1.88 m)	190 lb (86 kg)	4.7	Jan 24, 2010
Tyler Murphy; Quarterback	Recruit ratings: Scout: Rivals: ESPN: (78)					
Overall recruit ranking:
Note: In many cases, Scout, Rivals, 247Sports, On3, and ESPN may conflict in their listings of height and weight.; In these cases, the average was taken. ESPN grades are on a 100-point scale.; Sources: "2010 Team Ranking". Rivals.com.

== College career ==
Murphy joined the Florida Gators football team in 2010 as a freshman, but did not attempt a pass as a Florida Gator until the 2013 season. During a loss to the Miami Hurricanes in the Gators' second game of the 2013 season, Murphy unsuccessfully attempted a two-point conversion pass. In their following game, against the Tennessee Volunteers, the Gators starting quarterback Jeff Driskel broke his leg in the first quarter. Murphy came in and started the next six games, while Driskel was lost for the season. Before Driskel's injury, Tyler Murphy was unknown, but quickly became popular as he led Florida in a 31–17 win over Tennessee. Murphy then became the starting quarterback, and lead the Gators to a 24–7 win over Kentucky and a 30–10 victory against the Arkansas Razorbacks. After initial success, the Florida Gators lost their final seven games of the 2013 season.

During the Gators' homecoming loss to the Vanderbilt Commodores, Murphy injured his shoulder, and redshirt freshman quarterback Skyler Mornhinweg played in Florida's final three games. The 2013 Florida Gators team finished 4–8, marking their first losing record since 1979 and the first time since 1990 that they didn't play in a bowl. Murphy wore the number three on his jersey, and as the Florida quarterback, became known for his ability to run with the football.

After the poor 2013 season, Murphy became one of several Gators players who chose to transfer from Florida to a different school. He transferred to Boston College in January 2014. Steve Addazio, coach of the Eagles and former Florida Offensive Coordinator, named him the team's starting quarterback after the school's annual Spring game, which served as a tryout for Murphy as well as the other, younger quarterbacks on the team.

Murphy immediately flourished at Boston College; his ability as a running quarterback fit in perfectly with Addazio's rush-heavy offense. Over the season, Murphy led the team to a 7–6 record, highlighted by an upset victory over #9 USC in October, a game in which Murphy ran for 191 yards. He broke the school record for rushing yards by a quarterback (both single-season and career), passing Doug Flutie in only nine games. In the final game of the season against Syracuse, he broke the ACC single-season rushing record by a QB with 1,079 yards gained.

=== Statistics ===
Year	Team	Games			Passing								Rushing			
Year	Team	GP	GS	Record	Comp	Att	Pct	Yards	Avg	TD	Int	Rate	Att	Yards	Avg	TD
2010	Florida	Redshirt (redshirt)														
2011	Florida	2	0	0–0	0	0	0.0	0	0.0	0	0	0.0	0	0	0.0	0
2012	Florida	1	0	0–0	0	0	0.0	0	0.0	0	0	0.0	0	0	0.0	0
2013	Florida	9	6	2–4	112	185	60.5	1,216	6.6	6	5	121.1	61	61	1.0	3
2014	Boston College	13	13	7–6	131	230	57.0	1,623	7.1	13	10	126.2	181	1,184	6.5	11
Career		25	19	9–10	243	415	58.6	2,839	6.8	19	15	123.9	242	1,245	5.1	14

== Professional career ==
=== Pittsburgh Steelers ===
After his lone season at Boston College, Murphy was no longer eligible to play in the FBS. He participated in a pre-draft visit with the Pittsburgh Steelers coordinated by agent Nik Visger and was thought to be a possible late round pick. After ultimately going undrafted, he was signed as an undrafted free agent to the Pittsburgh Steelers. Although Murphy played quarterback in college, he was developed into a wide receiver by the Steelers. Pittsburgh has had a noted history of developing college quarterbacks into successful wide receivers, like former players Hines Ward, Kordell Stewart, and Antwaan Randle El. Murphy was released by the Steelers on September 23, 2015 and re-signed to the practice squad the following day.

On October 24, 2015, Murphy was activated from the practice squad to the main roster in order to play backup quarterback to Landry Jones in the Week 7 contest against the Kansas City Chiefs, in spite of Murphy's ongoing transition to the wide receiver position. This was due to injuries to starting quarterback Ben Roethlisberger and backup Michael Vick.

On November 4, 2015, Pittsburgh Steelers released wide receiver Murphy upon promoting cornerback Doran Grant to their active roster.

=== Miami Dolphins ===
On January 26, 2016, Murphy signed a futures contract with the Miami Dolphins. On August 6, 2016, Murphy reached an injury settlement with the Miami Dolphins.

== Coaching career ==
Murphy was named the head coach of Cape Coral High School in 2024 after the previous head coach was removed due to district investigation and subsequently resigned. Murphy himself resigned due to "personal reasons" in 2025 and succeeded by Alumnus Jaylen Watkins.
