= Valentino Blake =

American gridiron football player (born 1990)

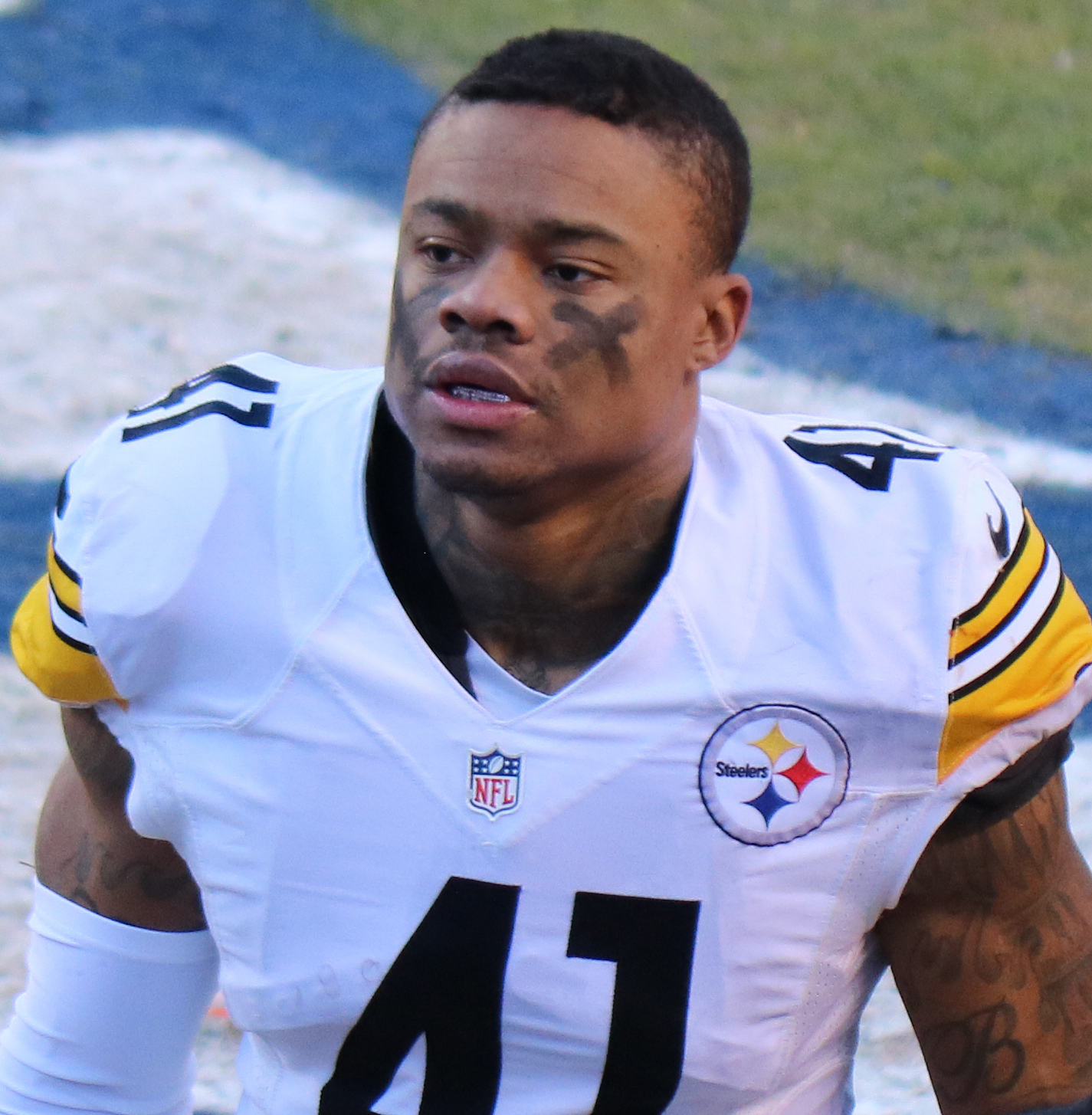
- Blake with the Pittsburgh Steelers in 2016

No. 38, 41, 47
- Position: Cornerback

Personal information
- Born: August 9, 1990 (age 36); Jacksonville, Florida, U.S.
- Listed height: 5 ft 9 in (1.75 m)
- Listed weight: 210 lb (95 kg)

Career information
- High school: Thurgood Marshall (Missouri City, Texas)
- College: UTEP
- NFL draft: 2012: undrafted

Career history
- Jacksonville Jaguars (2012); Pittsburgh Steelers (2013–2015); Tennessee Titans (2016); New York Giants (2017)*; Saskatchewan Roughriders (2019)*
- * Offseason or practice squad member only

Career NFL statistics
- Total tackles: 185
- Sacks: 1.0
- Forced fumbles: 2
- Fumble recoveries: 2
- Interceptions: 3
- Defensive touchdowns: 1
- Stats at Pro Football Reference

Antwon Valentino Blake (born August 9, 1990) is an American former professional football player who was a cornerback and special teamer in the National Football League (NFL). He was signed by the Jacksonville Jaguars as an undrafted free agent in 2012 and was also a member of the Pittsburgh Steelers, Tennessee Titans, New York Giants and Saskatchewan Roughriders. He played college football for the UTEP Miners.

In September 2016, Blake changed his first name from Antwon to Valentino.

== College career ==
He played college football at the University of Texas-El Paso (UTEP) from 2008 to 2011. During his career at UTEP, Blake totaled 137 tackles, 1 sack, 2 forced fumbles, and 1 interception. He started every game his junior and senior years also started 1 game his sophomore season before suffering an ankle injury.

== Professional career ==
=== Jacksonville Jaguars ===
Blake signed with the Jacksonville Jaguars following the 2012 NFL draft as a rookie free agent.

He was released on September 1, 2013.

=== Pittsburgh Steelers ===
On September 2, 2013, Blake was claimed on waivers by the Steelers. Blake would remain on the team over the next 3 seasons. He gathered his first interception during a Week 8, 2014 game against the Colts, picking off Andrew Luck.

In 2015, Blake became a starter. Though the Steeler pass defense was one of its worst in decades, Blake played a role. During Week 5, he picked off Philip Rivers, and ran it 70 yards for his first pick-six. He would have 2 more picks during the year, one in a Week 8 loss to the Bengals, and one against the Bengals in the Wild Card game.

=== Tennessee Titans ===
On March 17, 2016, Blake signed with the Tennessee Titans, reuniting him with former Steelers defensive coordinator Dick LeBeau.

=== New York Giants ===
On March 20, 2017, Blake signed with the New York Giants. On August 23, 2017, the Giants placed Blake on the Reserve/Exempt list after leaving practice. He was released on September 2, 2017.

On September 5, 2017, Blake announced his retirement from the NFL.

=== Saskatchewan Roughriders ===
Blake was signed by the Saskatchewan Roughriders on January 30, 2019.

== NFL career statistics ==
Legend
**Bold**	Career high

=== Regular season ===
Year	Team	Games		Tackles					Interceptions					Fumbles			
Year	Team	GP	GS	Cmb	Solo	Ast	Sck	TFL	Int	Yds	TD	Lng	PD	FF	FR	Yds	TD
2012	JAX	**16**	0	12	10	2	0.0	0	0	0	0	0	0	0	**1**	0	0
2013	PIT	14	0	11	8	3	0.0	0	0	0	0	0	0	0	0	0	0
2014	PIT	**16**	1	43	38	5	0.0	0	1	0	0	0	6	**1**	**1**	0	0
2015	PIT	**16**	**16**	**77**	**65**	**12**	**1.0**	**5**	**2**	**112**	**1**	**70**	**11**	**1**	0	0	0
2016	TEN	**16**	1	42	35	7	0.0	1	0	0	0	0	5	0	0	0	0
		78	18	185	156	29	1.0	6	3	112	1	70	22	2	2	0	0

=== Playoffs ===
Year	Team	Games		Tackles					Interceptions					Fumbles			
Year	Team	GP	GS	Cmb	Solo	Ast	Sck	TFL	Int	Yds	TD	Lng	PD	FF	FR	Yds	TD
2014	PIT	1	0	0	0	0	0.0	0	0	0	0	0	0	0	0	0	0
2015	PIT	**2**	**2**	**2**	**2**	0	0.0	0	**1**	**35**	0	**35**	**1**	0	0	0	0
		3	2	2	2	0	0.0	0	1	35	0	35	1	0	0	0	0
