= Will Johnson (fullback) =

American football player (born 1988)

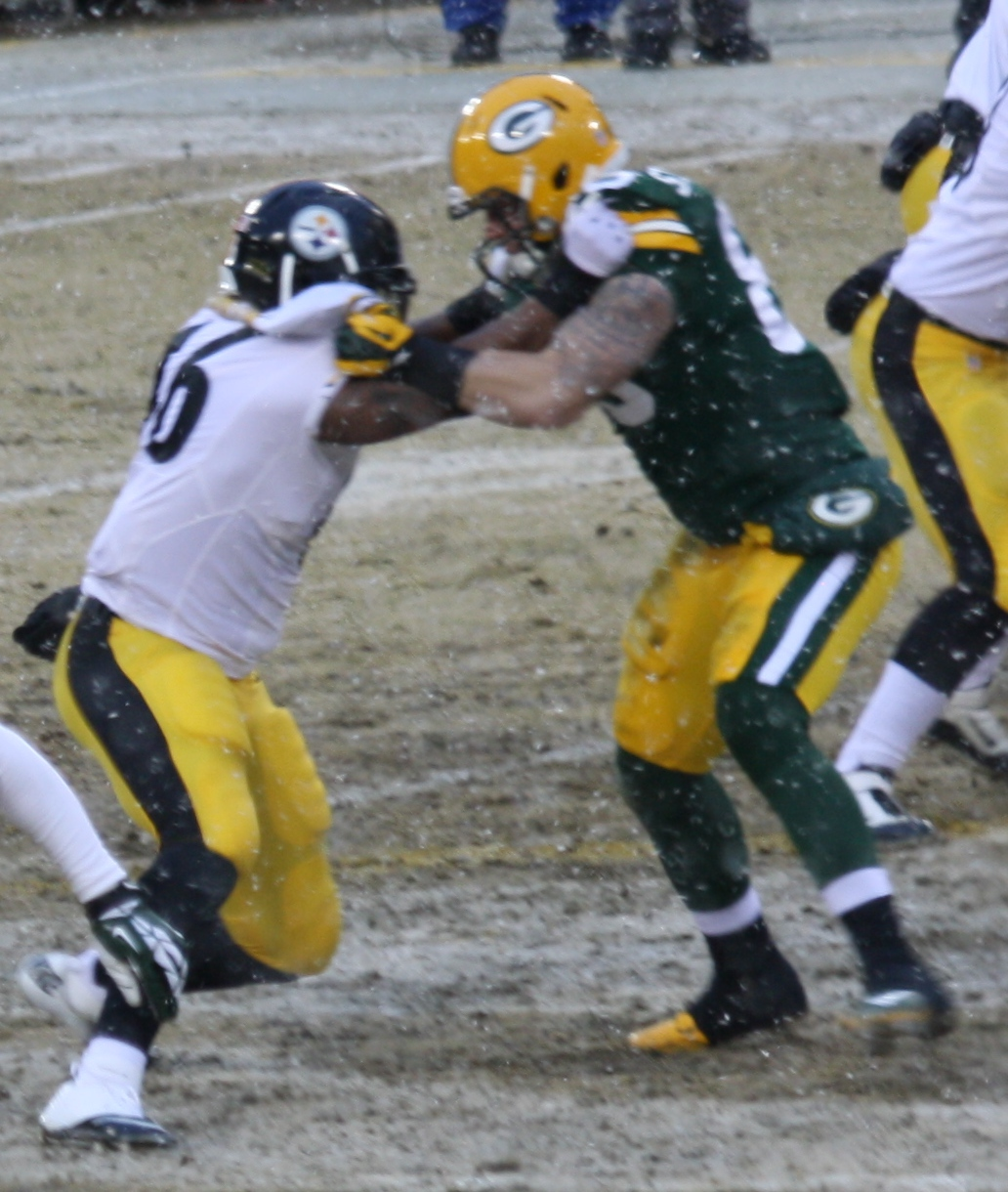
- Johnson, left, blocking for a punt in 2013

No. 46
- Position: Fullback

Personal information
- Born: November 14, 1988 (age 38); Dayton, Ohio, U.S.
- Listed height: 6 ft 2 in (1.88 m)
- Listed weight: 240 lb (109 kg)

Career information
- High school: Centerville (Centerville, Ohio)
- College: West Virginia
- NFL draft: 2011: undrafted

Career history

Playing
- Pittsburgh Steelers (2012–2015); New York Giants (2016)

Coaching
- Pittsburgh Maulers (2022) Running backs coach

Career NFL statistics
- Rushing yards: 14
- Receiving yards: 235
- Total touchdowns: 3
- Stats at Pro Football Reference

William Christopher Johnson (born November 14, 1988) is an American football coach and former fullback. After graduating from West Virginia University in 2011, Johnson sat out an entire year prior to being granted permission to participate in West Virginia’s 2012 Pro Day. He was signed by the Pittsburgh Steelers as an undrafted free agent in March 2012 after his second consecutive Pro Day appearance. He was also a member of the New York Giants.

== Early life ==
Johnson is a 2007 graduate of Centerville High School in Ohio. He was a two-year starter at running back for the Elks, earning a team record of 20-1 his junior and senior season under head coach, Ron Ullery. Johnson’s honors include receiving the 2007 Sonny Unger Award, 1st Team All Conference, Honorable Mention All State and being named to the 2007 Big 33 team.

== College career ==
In 2007, Johnson committed to West Virginia University after being highly recruited by Rich Rodriguez, then, head coach of the Mountaineers. Prior to committing, Johnson received several full-scholarship offers from Michigan State, Cincinnati, Ohio State, Ohio University, Marshall and Eastern Michigan.

While at WVU, Johnson transitioned from wide receiver to halfback. He received many honors, including Offensive Champion, “Ideal Mountaineer”, as well as being voted Senior Team Captain. His college career concluded with the 2010 Champs Sports Bowl.

== Professional career ==
Pre-draft measurables
Height	Weight	40-yard dash	10-yard split	20-yard split	20-yard shuttle	Three-cone drill	Vertical jump	Broad jump	Bench press
6 ft 1 7/8 in (1.88 m)	240 lb (109 kg)	4.69 s	1.57 s	2.73 s	4.29 s	7.00 s	33.5 in (0.85 m)	9 ft 4 in (2.84 m)	26 reps
All values from Pro Day

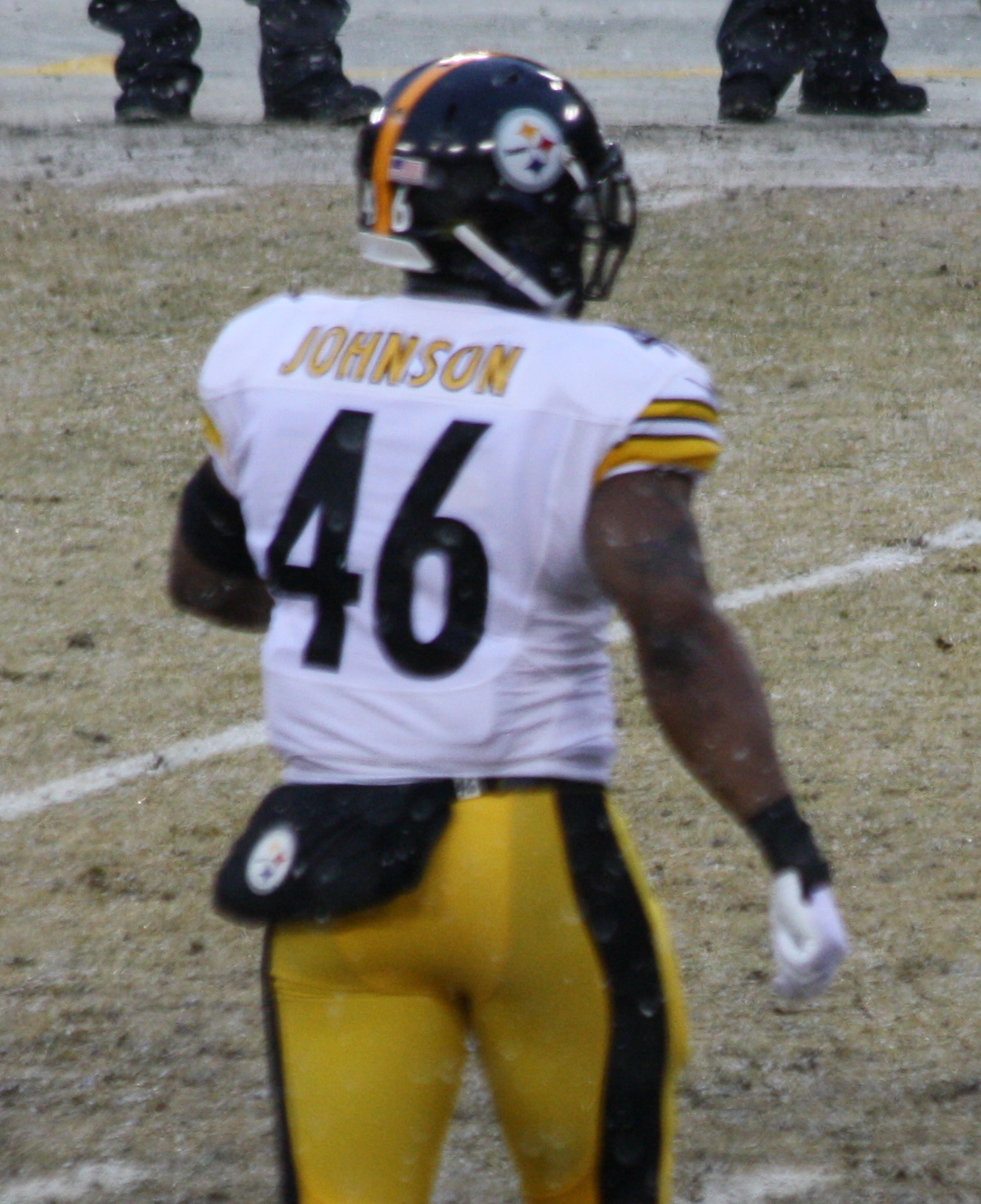
Johnson entering the field in 2013

=== Pittsburgh Steelers ===
Johnson was not invited to attend the NFL Combine and ultimately went undrafted. In the following year, Johnson worked while continuing to train for an opportunity to play in the NFL. Johnson caught the attention of Pittsburgh Steelers head coach Mike Tomlin and general manager Kevin Colbert at the 2012 WVU Pro Day workout. He was signed by the Steelers.

After being named to the 2012 mid-season all-rookie team, he scored his first NFL career touchdown in a 27-12 win over the Washington Redskins.

=== New York Giants ===
Johnson signed with the New York Giants on April 4, 2016. On September 3, 2016, he was placed on injured reserve. On March 10, 2017, Johnson was released by the Giants.

== Coaching career ==
In 2022 Johnson became the running backs coach for the Pittsburgh Maulers.
