= L. T. Walton =

American football player (born 1992)

No. 95, 96, 63
- Position: Defensive tackle

Personal information
- Born: March 31, 1992 (age 34); Clinton Township, Michigan, U.S.
- Listed height: 6 ft 5 in (1.96 m)
- Listed weight: 305 lb (138 kg)

Career information
- High school: Clintondale (Clinton Township)
- College: Central Michigan (2011–2014)
- NFL draft: 2015: 6th round, 199th overall pick

Career history
- Pittsburgh Steelers (2015–2018); Buffalo Bills (2019)*; Pittsburgh Steelers (2019)
- * Offseason or practice squad member only

Awards and highlights
- First-team All-MAC (2014)

Career NFL statistics
- Total tackles: 22
- Sacks: 2
- Stats at Pro Football Reference

Leterrius Deon Walton (born March 31, 1992) is an American former professional football player who was a defensive tackle in the National Football League (NFL). He played college football for the Central Michigan Chippewas and was selected by the Pittsburgh Steelers in the sixth round of the 2015 NFL draft.

== College career ==
In his career at Central Michigan University, Walton played in 54 games with 30 starts.

== Professional career ==
=== Pre-draft ===
Coming out of college, Walton was projected by many analysts to be selected in the fifth or sixth round. He was ranked the 17th-best defensive tackle out of the 177 available by NFLDraftScout.com. Walton was invited to the NFL Combine and completed all the required workouts and positional drills. He was satisfied enough with his combine numbers that he only participated in positional drills at Central Michigan's Pro Day. Analysts gave him positive reviews for his large frame, athletic ability, and quick hands, and called him a disciplined pass rusher with an explosive first step that can penetrate the line. He was also criticized for his technique, limited pass rush, and inconsistent ability to finish and get to tackles.

Pre-draft measurables
Height	Weight	Arm length	Hand span	40-yard dash	10-yard split	20-yard split	20-yard shuttle	Three-cone drill	Vertical jump	Broad jump	Bench press
6 ft 4 7/8 in (1.95 m)	319 lb (145 kg)	32 1/4 in (0.82 m)	10 1/4 in (0.26 m)	5.25 s	1.78 s	2.99 s	4.78 s	7.91 s	27.0 in (0.69 m)	8 ft 7 in (2.62 m)	25 reps
All values from NFL Combine

=== Pittsburgh Steelers (first stint) ===
The Pittsburgh Steelers selected Walton in the sixth round (199th overall) of the 2015 NFL draft. On May 8, 2015, the Steelers signed him to a four-year, $2.39 million contract with $116,928 guaranteed. On August 5, 2015, he made the Steelers' active 53-man roster. He began his rookie regular season as the backup right defensive end to Cameron Heyward. He made his regular season debut on September 27, 2015, in a Week 3 victory over the St. Louis Rams.

During his rookie season of 2015, he played in six games without recording any statistics.

Walton began his second season as the Steelers' fourth defensive end on the depth chart behind Heyward, Tuitt, and Ricardo Mathews. On December 11, 2016, he earned his first career start after Heyward was lost for the season due to injury. In the 27–20 victory over the Buffalo Bills he recorded his first career tackle and finished the game with two combined tackles.

Walton competed with Tyson Alualu, Lavon Hooks, Roy Philon, and Christian Brown for the backup defensive end position throughout training camp in 2017. He was named the backup left defensive end behind Cameron Heyward to begin the regular season. During the Steelers' 21–18 season-opening victory over the Cleveland Browns, he recorded one tackle.

=== Buffalo Bills ===
On June 5, 2019, Walton signed with the Bills. He was released on August 31, 2019.

=== Pittsburgh Steelers (second stint) ===
On October 10, 2019, Walton re-signed with the Steelers following an injury to Stephon Tuitt. He was placed on injured reserve on November 19, 2019.
