= Reese Dismukes =

American football player (born 1992)

No. 62
- Position: Center

Personal information
- Born: October 20, 1992 (age 34); Spanish Fort, Alabama, U.S.
- Listed height: 6 ft 3 in (1.91 m)
- Listed weight: 300 lb (136 kg)

Career information
- High school: Spanish Fort
- College: Auburn (2011–2014)
- NFL draft: 2015: undrafted

Career history
- Pittsburgh Steelers (2015)*; Carolina Panthers (2015-2016)*; Denver Broncos (2016)*
- * Offseason or practice squad member only

Awards and highlights
- Rimington Trophy (2014); Jim Parker Trophy (2014); Consensus All-American (2014); 2× First-team All-SEC (2013, 2014)
- Stats at Pro Football Reference

Reese Dismukes (born October 20, 1992) is an American former professional football center who played in the National Football League (NFL). He played college football for the Auburn Tigers, where he won the Rimington Trophy and was recognized as a consensus All-American in 2014. He was signed by the Pittsburgh Steelers as an undrafted free agent after the 2014 NFL draft.

== Early life ==
Dismukes attended Spanish Fort High School in Spanish Fort, Alabama, where he played football and competed in track. He was a four-star recruit by Rivals.com and was ranked as the number one center in his class. He committed to Auburn University in April 2010 to play college football.

== College career ==
Dismukes started all 13 games at center as a freshman in 2011. As a sophomore in 2012, he started all 10 games he played in, missing two due to injury. Dismukes started all 14 games as a junior in 2013 and was a first-team All-SEC selection. Dismukes entered his senior season in 2014 as a fourth-year starter. He again started all 13 games, winning the Rimington Trophy and being named a consensus All-American. He ended his career starting all 50 games he played in.

== Professional career ==
Pre-draft measurables
Height	Weight	Arm length	Hand span	40-yard dash	10-yard split	20-yard split	20-yard shuttle	Three-cone drill	Vertical jump	Broad jump	Bench press
6 ft 2 3/4 in (1.90 m)	296 lb (134 kg)	32 1/4 in (0.82 m)	8 7/8 in (0.23 m)	5.31 s	1.91 s	3.12 s	4.70 s	7.69 s	27.5 in (0.70 m)	8 ft 11 in (2.72 m)	23 reps

=== Pittsburgh Steelers ===
On May 2, 2015, Dismukes was signed as an undrafted free agent. On September 5, 2015, he was waived. On September 6, 2015, Dismukes was signed to the Steelers' practice squad. On September 8, 2015, he was released from the practice squad.

=== Carolina Panthers ===
On October 27, 2015, Dismukes was signed to the Panthers' practice squad. On November 23, 2015, he was released from practice squad. On November 24, 2015, he was re-signed to the practice squad. On February 7, 2016, Dismukes's Panthers played in Super Bowl 50. In the game, the Panthers fell to the Denver Broncos by a score of 24–10. On August 28, 2016, Dismukes was waived by the Panthers.

=== Denver Broncos ===
On December 28, 2016, Dismukes was signed to the Broncos' practice squad.
