= Shayon Green =

American football player (born 1991)

Shayon T Green
No. 49
- Position: Defensive line

Personal information
- Born: July 9, 1991 (age 35); Tifton, Georgia, U.S.
- Listed height: 6 ft 3 in (1.91 m)
- Listed weight: 264 lb (120 kg)

Career information
- High school: Tifton (GA) Tift County
- College: Miami (FL)
- NFL draft: 2014: undrafted

Career history
- Pittsburgh Steelers (2015)*; Winnipeg Blue Bombers (2016)
- * Offseason or practice squad member only

Awards and highlights
- ACC Brian Piccolo Award (2012)
- Stats at CFL.ca

Shayon Green (born July 9, 1991) is an American former football defensive lineman. He played college football at the University of Miami from 2009 to 2013.

== Early life ==
Green attended Tift County High School in Tifton, Georgia. He was Rated No. 65 weakside defensive end prospect in nation by Rivals.com. As a junior, he played defensive end and had 60 tackles, 8 sacks and 1 interception. As a senior, he had 125 tackles, 2 sacks and 5 forced fumbles. Green committed to the University of Miami to play college football.

== College career ==
Green played at Miami from 2009 to 2013.

=== College football awards and honors ===
- Captain's award (2013)
- Melching leadership award (2013)
- Defensive Most Valuable Player (2012)
- ACC's Brian Piccolo AwardCo-Winner (2012)

Pro day measurable
| Ht | Wt | 40-yd dash | 20-yd split | 10-yd split | 20-ss | 3-cone | Vert | Broad | BP |
| 6 ft 3 in | 264 | 4.58 | 2.70 | 1.64 | 4.47 | 7.49 | 29 1/2 | 09'01" | 34 |
All values from nfldraftscout.com

== Professional career ==
Coming out of college, Green was considered a "Prospect Worth Watching" by Dane Brugler. He was rated the 61 best defensive end out of the 162 available by NFLDraftScout.com. Although undrafted the Miami Dolphins agreed to sign him as a free agents in 2014. He attended Miami's Pro Day on 04/03/2014 where he ran the 40 yard dash in 4.58, Vertical Jump 29.5, 225 Lb. Bench Reps 34, 3-Cone Drill 7.49, and Broad Jump 09'01". Green was later signed by the Pittsburgh Steelers on Thursday April 2, 2015 where he played throughout the preseason and recorded 11 tackles 10 solo and 1 force fumble. Green was waived by the Steelers on September 5 and was picked up by the Winnipeg Blue Bombers in 2016, where he concluded the season with 22 tackles, 3 sacks and 1 interception.
