= Doran Grant =

American football player (born 1992)

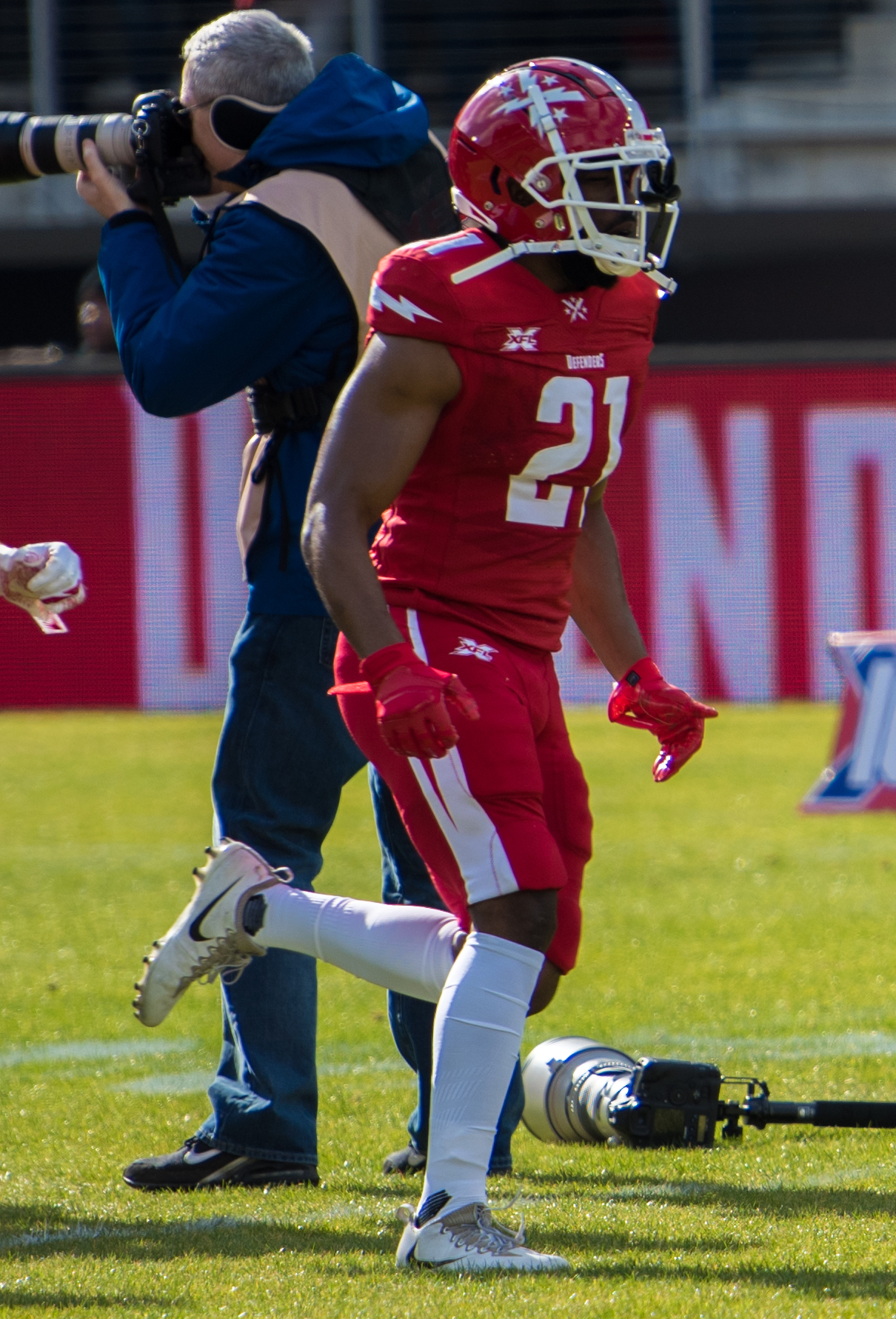
- Grant with the DC Defenders in 2020

No. 24, 21
- Position: Cornerback

Personal information
- Born: November 30, 1992 (age 33); Akron, Ohio, U.S.
- Listed height: 5 ft 10 in (1.78 m)
- Listed weight: 196 lb (89 kg)

Career information
- High school: St. Vincent–St. Mary (Akron)
- College: Ohio State
- NFL draft: 2015: 4th round, 121st overall pick

Career history
- Pittsburgh Steelers (2015); Buffalo Bills (2016)*; New York Giants (2016)*; Jacksonville Jaguars (2016–2017); Chicago Bears (2017–2018)*; Arizona Hotshots (2019)*; Atlanta Legends (2019); DC Defenders (2020); Winnipeg Blue Bombers (2020)*
- * Offseason or practice squad member only

Awards and highlights
- CFP national champion (2015); First-team All-Big Ten (2014)
- Stats at Pro Football Reference

Doran Grant (born November 30, 1992) is an American former professional football cornerback. He played college football for the Ohio State Buckeyes and was selected by the Pittsburgh Steelers of the National Football League (NFL) in the fourth round of the 2015 NFL draft.

== Early life ==
Grant attended St. Vincent–St. Mary High School in Akron, Ohio. During his career, he had 203 tackles and six interceptions on defense and 88 receptions for 1,115 yards and 25 touchdowns on offense. Grant was a four-star recruit by Rivals.com and was ranked as the No. 3 cornerback in his class.

In track & field, Grant competed as both a hurdler and a sprinter. In 2010 Grant won the state title in the 60m hurdles indoors, and the 110m hurdles outdoors. He had personal-bests of 11.38 in the 100m, 23.4 in the 200m, 8.05 in the 60m hurdles and 14.22 in the 110m hurdles.

Grant's father, Ted Jones, played college football at Michigan State University in the 1980s.

== College career ==
Grant played in all 13 games as a true freshman at Ohio State University in 2011. As a sophomore in 2012, he played in 12 games with one start and had one interception. Grant became a starter for the first time his junior season in 2013. He started all 14 games, recording 58 tackles and three interceptions. He returned as a starter his senior season in 2014.

== Professional career ==
Pre-draft measurables
Height	Weight	Arm length	Hand span	40-yard dash	10-yard split	20-yard split	20-yard shuttle	Three-cone drill	Vertical jump	Broad jump	Bench press
5 ft 10 1/4 in (1.78 m)	200 lb (91 kg)	30 1/4 in (0.77 m)	9 3/8 in (0.24 m)	4.44 s	1.52 s	2.57 s	4.19 s	7.09 s	35.5 in (0.90 m)	10 ft 5 in (3.18 m)	21 reps
All values from NFL Combine/Pro Day

=== Pittsburgh Steelers ===
The Pittsburgh Steelers selected Grant in the fourth round (121st overall) of the 2015 NFL draft. The Steelers signed Grant on May 11, 2015, but released him on September 6. On September 7, Grant was signed to the Steelers' practice squad. On November 4, Grant was signed to the Steelers' active roster. On September 3, 2016, he was released by the Steelers as part of final roster cuts.

=== Buffalo Bills ===
On September 5, 2016, Grant was signed to the Buffalo Bills' practice squad. He was released from the Bills' practice squad on September 13.

=== New York Giants ===
Grant was signed to the New York Giants' practice squad on September 27, 2016. He was released on October 19.

=== Jacksonville Jaguars ===
On October 24, 2016, the Jacksonville Jaguars signed Grant to their practice squad. He signed a reserve/future contract with the Jaguars on January 2, 2017.

On September 2, 2017, Grant was placed on injured reserve. He was released on September 18.

=== Chicago Bears ===
On September 26, 2017, Grant was signed to the Chicago Bears' practice squad. He signed a reserve/future contract with the Bears on January 1, 2018.

On September 1, 2018, Grant was waived by the Bears.

=== Atlanta Legends ===
On October 12, 2018, Grant signed with the Arizona Hotshots of the Alliance of American Football (AAF), but eventually joined the Atlanta Legends for the 2019 AAF season. The league ceased operations in April 2019.

=== DC Defenders ===
Grant was selected by the DC Defenders of the XFL in the 4th round during phase four in the 2020 XFL draft. He had his contract terminated when the league suspended operations on April 10, 2020.

=== Winnipeg Blue Bombers ===
Grant signed with the Winnipeg Blue Bombers of the Canadian Football League (CFL) on May 28, 2020. After the CFL canceled the 2020 season due to the COVID-19 pandemic, Grant chose to opt-out of his contract with the Blue Bombers on September 3.
