= 2014 Pittsburgh Steelers season =

82nd US team football season

- Owner: The Rooney Family
- General manager: Kevin Colbert
- Head coach: Mike Tomlin
- Offensive coordinator: Todd Haley
- Defensive coordinator: Dick LeBeau
- Home stadium: Heinz Field

Results
- Record: 11–5
- Division place: 1st AFC North
- Playoffs: Lost Wild Card Playoffs (vs. Ravens) 17–30
- All-Pros: Le'Veon Bell (1st team); Antonio Brown (1st team); Maurkice Pouncey (1st team); Lawrence Timmons (2nd team)
- Pro Bowlers: RB Le'Veon Bell; WR Antonio Brown; C Maurkice Pouncey; QB Ben Roethlisberger; ILB Lawrence Timmons
- Team MVP: Le'Veon Bell
- Team ROY: Martavis Bryant

Uniform
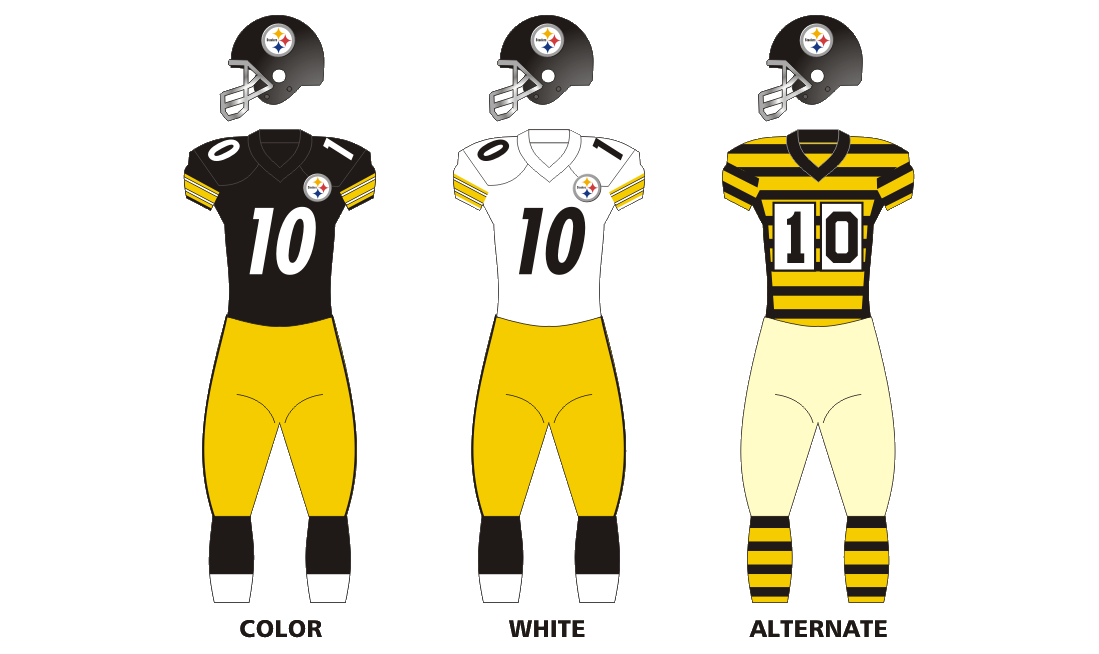

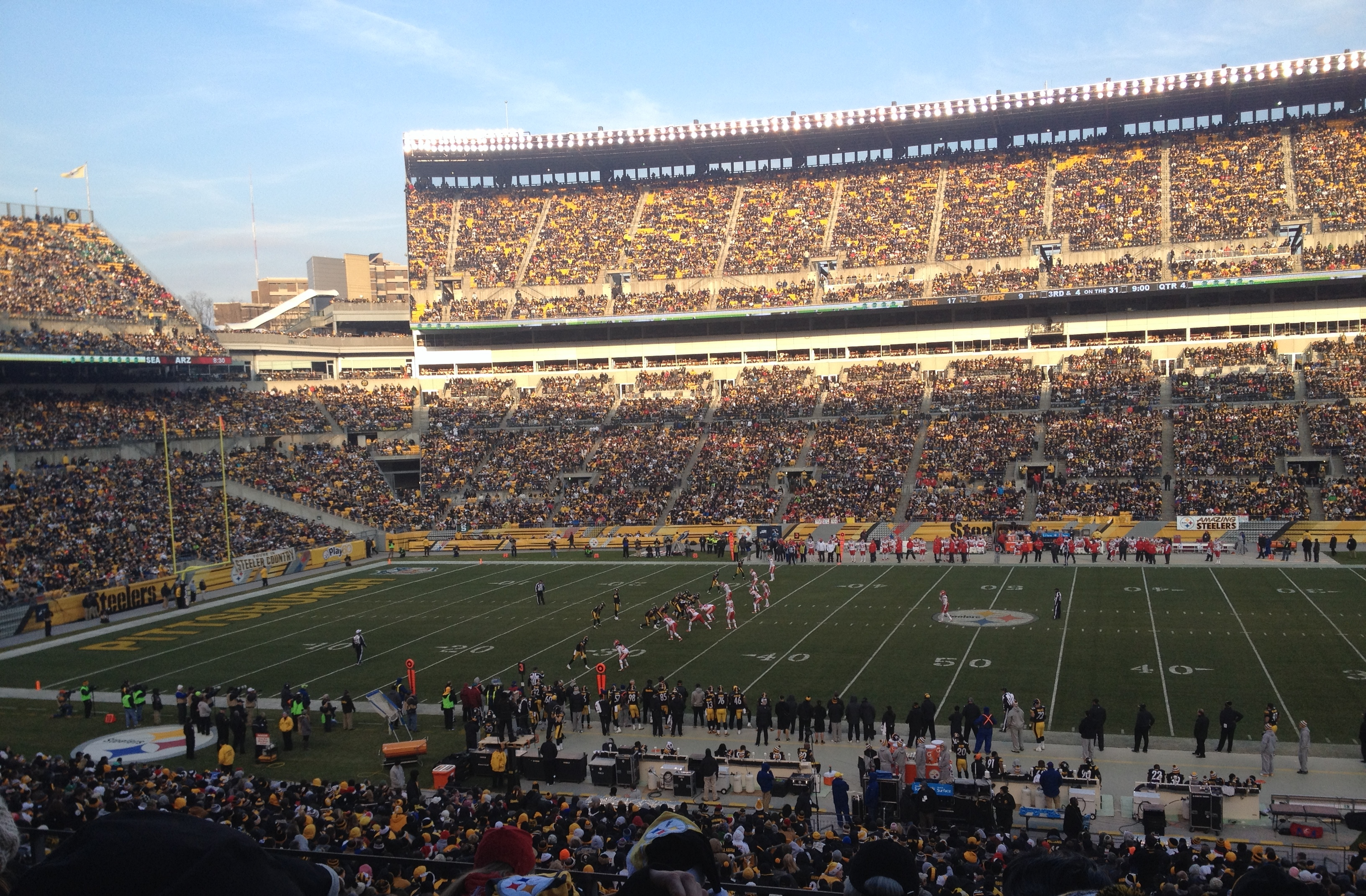
The Steelers playing the Kansas City Chiefs on December 21.

The 2014 season was the Pittsburgh Steelers' 82nd in the National Football League (NFL), their 15th under general manager Kevin Colbert and their eighth under head coach Mike Tomlin.

The Steelers honored the 40th anniversary of their first Super Bowl winning team, Super Bowl IX, during their Week 13 game against the New Orleans Saints at Heinz Field on November 30 (the Steelers played the Super Bowl at Tulane Stadium that year). The team wore a special patch and honored the players at halftime. Though it also served as the team's annual alumni weekend, the team did not wear their alternate 1934 "Bumblebee" throwbacks for this game. Instead, the Steelers wore the "Bumblebee" jerseys against the Indianapolis Colts on October 26.

They managed to improve from their 8–8 record from each of their previous two seasons with their week 15 victory against the Atlanta Falcons, and ensured their first winning season since 2011. They also clinched a playoff berth for the first time since that same year with their week 16 victory over the Kansas City Chiefs. The Steelers won the AFC North division title, but lost to the Baltimore Ravens in the wild-card round of the playoffs by a score of 30–17. The Steelers became the first team in NFL history to have a 4,500-yard passer, 1,500-yard receiver and 1,300-yard rusher in the same season. Aided by a monster season from Ben Roethlisberger where he passed for 4,952 yards and 32 scores to go with his 103.3 passer rating (including a 2-game stretch where he threw 12), the Steelers scored 436 points in the regular season, which is a franchise record. They scored 32 or more points 5 times during the season.

This would be the last season until 2020 (and the last one of the 2010s) in which the Steelers did not face the New England Patriots.

== 2014 draft class ==
2014 Pittsburgh Steelers draft
Round	Pick	Player	Position	College	Notes
1	15	Ryan Shazier *	Inside linebacker	Ohio State	
2	46	Stephon Tuitt	Defensive end	Notre Dame	
3	97+	Dri Archer	Running back	Kent State	
4	118	Martavis Bryant	Wide receiver	Clemson	Team Rookie of the Year
5	157	Shaquille Richardson	Cornerback	Arizona	
5	173+	Wesley Johnson	Offensive guard	Vanderbilt	
6	192	Jordan Zumwalt	Inside linebacker	UCLA	
7	215+	Daniel McCullers	Defensive tackle	Tennessee	
7	230	Rob Blanchflower	Tight end	Massachusetts	
Made roster † Pro Football Hall of Fame * Made at least one Pro Bowl during career

(+) Compensatory Selection

Draft trades

- The Steelers traded their original third-round selection (No. 83 overall) to the Cleveland Browns in exchange for the Browns' 2013 fourth-round selection.

== Personnel ==
=== Staff / Coaches ===
2014 Pittsburgh Steelers staff
Front office: Chairman – Dan Rooney; President – Art Rooney II; Vice president – Art Rooney, Jr.; general manager – Kevin Colbert; Director of football and business administration – Omar Khan; Player personnel coordinator – Dan Rooney Jr.; College scouting coordinator – Phil Kreidler; Pro personnel coordinator – Brandon Hunt; Head coaches: Head coach – Mike Tomlin; Assistant head coach/defensive line – John Mitchell; Offensive coaches: Offensive coordinator – Todd Haley; Quarterbacks – Randy Fichtner; Running backs – James Saxon; Wide receivers – Richard Mann; Tight ends – James Daniel; Offensive line – Mike Munchak; Offensive assistant – Shaun Sarrett	Defensive coaches: Defensive coordinator – Dick LeBeau; Linebackers – Keith Butler; Defensive backs – Carnell Lake; Defensive assistant – Jerry Olsavsky; Defensive assistant – Joey Porter; Special teams coaches: Special teams coordinator – Danny Smith; Strength and conditioning: Strength and conditioning – Garrett Giemont; Conditioning assistant – Marcel Pastoor

=== Final roster ===
2014 Pittsburgh Steelers roster
Quarterbacks (QB): 5 Bruce Gradkowski; 3 Landry Jones; 7 Ben Roethlisberger; Running backs (RB): 13 Dri Archer; 26 Le'Veon Bell; 40 Josh Harris; 46 Will Johnson FB; Wide receivers (WR): 84 Antonio Brown; 15 Justin Brown; 10 Martavis Bryant; 85 Darrius Heyward-Bey; 16 Lance Moore; 11 Markus Wheaton; Tight ends (TE): 83 Heath Miller; 82 Michael Palmer; 89 Matt Spaeth	Offensive linemen (OL): 76 Mike Adams T; 68 Kelvin Beachum T; 66 David DeCastro G; 73 Ramon Foster G; 77 Marcus Gilbert T; 74 Chris Hubbard T; 53 Maurkice Pouncey C; 72 Cody Wallace G/C; Defensive linemen (DL): 71 Clifton Geathers DE; 97 Cameron Heyward DE; 62 Daniel McCullers NT; 90 Steve McLendon NT; 96 Cam Thomas DE; 91 Stephon Tuitt DE	Linebackers (LB): 57 Terence Garvin ILB; 92 James Harrison OLB; 95 Jarvis Jones OLB; 55 Arthur Moats OLB; 50 Ryan Shazier ILB; 51 Sean Spence ILB; 94 Lawrence Timmons ILB; 98 Vince Williams ILB; 93 Jason Worilds OLB; Defensive backs (DB): 20 Will Allen SS; 41 Antwon Blake CB; 22 William Gay CB; 21 Robert Golden FS; 25 Brice McCain CB; 23 Mike Mitchell FS; 43 Troy Polamalu SS; 24 Ike Taylor CB; 29 Shamarko Thomas SS; 35 Ross Ventrone SS; 39 B. W. Webb CB; Special teams (ST): 6 Shaun Suisham K; 60 Greg Warren LS; 9 Brad Wing P	Practice squad: 87 Rob Blanchflower TE; 30 Kevin Fogg CB; 18 C. J. Goodwin WR; 79 Ethan Hemer DE; 44 Howard Jones LB; 65 Joe Kruger DE; 67 Ronald Patrick G; 49 LaDarius Perkins RB; 42 Jordan Sullen CB; 78 Alejandro Villanueva T; Reserve: 28 Cortez Allen CB (IR); -- Bryant Browning G (IR); 99 Brett Keisel DE (IR); 56 Jordan Zumwalt ILB (IR); Rookies in italics 53 active, 4 reserve, 10 practice squad

== Schedule ==
=== Preseason ===
Week	Date	Opponent	Result	Record	Venue	Recap
1	August 9	at New York Giants	**L** 16–20	0–1	MetLife Stadium	Recap
2	August 16	Buffalo Bills	**W** 19–16	1–1	Heinz Field	Recap
3	August 21	at Philadelphia Eagles	**L** 21–31	1–2	Lincoln Financial Field	Recap
4	August 28	Carolina Panthers	**L** 0–10	1–3	Heinz Field	Recap

=== Regular season ===
Week	Date	Opponent	Result	Record	Venue	Recap
1	September 7	**Cleveland Browns**	**W** 30–27	1–0	Heinz Field	Recap
2	September 11	at **Baltimore Ravens**	**L** 6–26	1–1	M&T Bank Stadium	Recap
3	September 21	at Carolina Panthers	**W** 37–19	2–1	Bank of America Stadium	Recap
4	September 28	Tampa Bay Buccaneers	**L** 24–27	2–2	Heinz Field	Recap
5	October 5	at Jacksonville Jaguars	**W** 17–9	3–2	EverBank Field	Recap
6	October 12	at **Cleveland Browns**	**L** 10–31	3–3	FirstEnergy Stadium	Recap
7	October 20	Houston Texans	**W** 30–23	4–3	Heinz Field	Recap
8	October 26	Indianapolis Colts	**W** 51–34	5–3	Heinz Field	Recap
9	November 2	**Baltimore Ravens**	**W** 43–23	6–3	Heinz Field	Recap
10	November 9	at New York Jets	**L** 13–20	6–4	MetLife Stadium	Recap
11	November 17	at Tennessee Titans	**W** 27–24	7–4	LP Field	Recap
12	Bye					
13	November 30	New Orleans Saints	**L** 32–35	7–5	Heinz Field	Recap
14	December 7	at **Cincinnati Bengals**	**W** 42–21	8–5	Paul Brown Stadium	Recap
15	December 14	at Atlanta Falcons	**W** 27–20	9–5	Georgia Dome	Recap
16	December 21	Kansas City Chiefs	**W** 20–12	10–5	Heinz Field	Recap
17	December 28	**Cincinnati Bengals**	**W** 27–17	11–5	Heinz Field	Recap

Note: Intra-division opponents are in bold text.

=== Postseason ===
Week	Date	Opponent	Result	Record	Venue	Recap
Wild Card	January 3	Baltimore Ravens (6)	**L** 17–30	0–1	Heinz Field	Recap

== Game summaries ==
=== Regular season ===
==== Week 1: vs. Cleveland Browns ====
Week One: Cleveland Browns at Pittsburgh Steelers – Game summary

Quarter	1	2	3	4	Total
Browns	3	0	14	10	27
Steelers	10	17	0	3	30

at Heinz Field, Pittsburgh, Pennsylvania

- Date: September 7
- Game time: 1:00 p.m. EDT
- Game weather: 72 °F (22 °C), (Partly Cloudy)
- Game attendance: 64,598
- Referee: Carl Cheffers
- TV announcers (CBS): Ian Eagle, Dan Fouts and Jenny Dell
- Recap, Gamebook

Game information

First quarter

- PIT – 9:58 Shaun Suisham 36-yard FG. Drive: 9 plays, 62 yards, 5:02 (PIT 3–0)
- CLE – 5:39 Billy Cundiff 39-yard FG. Drive: 8 plays, 54 yards, 2:52 (TIE 3–3)
- PIT – 0:50 LeGarrette Blount 7-yard TD run, Shaun Suisham kick. Drive: 9 plays, 80 yards, 4:49 (PIT 10–3)

Second quarter

- PIT – 9:49 Antonio Brown 35-yard TD pass from Ben Roethlisberger, Shaun Suisham kick. Drive: 6 plays, 89 yards, 3:12 (PIT 17–3)
- PIT – 7:43 Le'Veon Bell 38-yard TD run, Shaun Suisham kick. Drive: 2 plays, 50 yards, 0:48 (PIT 24–3)
- PIT – 0:00 Shaun Suisham 34-yard FG. Drive: 10 plays, 64 yards, 1:44 (PIT 27–3)

Third quarter

- CLE – 13:27 Isaiah Crowell 3-yard TD run, Billy Cundiff kick. Drive: 6 plays, 80 yards, 1:33 (PIT 27–10)
- CLE – 9:05 Isaiah Crowell 15-yard TD run, Billy Cundiff kick. Drive: 6 plays, 59 yards, 2:31 (PIT 27–17)

Fourth quarter

- CLE – 14:57 Billy Cundiff 25-yard FG. Drive: 12 plays, 75 yards, 4:45 (PIT 27–20)
- CLE – 11:15 Ben Tate 9-yard TD pass from Brian Hoyer, Billy Cundiff kick. Drive: 7 plays, 51 yards, 2:35 (TIE 27–27)
- PIT – 0:00 Shaun Suisham 41-yard FG. Drive: 5 plays, 33 yards, 0:47 (PIT 30–27)

Top passers

- CLE – Brian Hoyer 18/30, 222 yards, 1 TD
- PIT – Ben Roethlisberger 23/34, 365 yards, 1 TD, 1INT

Top rushers

- CLE – Terrance West 16 carries, 100 yards
- PIT – Le'Veon Bell 21 carries, 109 yards, 1 TD

Top receivers

- CLE – Andrew Hawkins 8 receptions, 87 yards
- PIT – Antonio Brown 5 receptions, 116 yards, 1 TD

Top tacklers

- CLE – Donte Whitner 13 tackles, 1 assist
- PIT – Troy Polamalu 6 tackles, 5 assists

The Steelers started their 2014 season at home against the Browns. In the first quarter, the Steelers would score first when Shaun Suisham kicked a 36-yard field goal for a 3–0 lead. However, the Browns were able to tie it up when Billy Cundiff kicked a 39-yard field goal for a 3–3 game. The Steelers would score 24 unanswered points to end the first half with LaGarrette Blount running for a 7-yard TD to retake the lead 10–3. In the 2nd quarter, the Steelers continued their domination when Ben Roethlisberger found Antonio Brown on a 35-yard TD for a 17–3 lead followed by Le'Veon Bell running in for a TD from 38 yards out to increase their lead to 24–3 followed by Suisham nailing yet another field goal from 34 yards out as they led 27–3 at halftime. After the break, in the 3rd quarter, the Browns went to work as Isisah Crowell ran for 2 touchdowns: from 3 and 15 yards out for a 27–10 and 27–17 game. In the 4th quarter, the Browns managed to come within a TD as Cundiff nailed a 25-yard field goal for a 27–20 game. Later on, Brian Hoyer hooked up with Travis Benjamein on a 9-yard TD pass to tie the game up 27–27. Regardless, Roethlisberger was able to move his team down the field and eventually, Suisham kicked the game-winning 41-yard field goal to win it 30–27 for the Steelers' only 3 points of the 2nd half.

With the win, the Steelers started their season 1–0 for the first time since 2010 and in turn handed the Browns their 10th straight regular season opening loss.

==== Week 2: at Baltimore Ravens ====
Week Two: Pittsburgh Steelers at Baltimore Ravens – Game summary

Quarter	1	2	3	4	Total
Steelers	0	3	3	0	6
Ravens	7	3	7	9	26

at M&T Bank Stadium, Baltimore, Maryland

- Date: September 11
- Game time: 8:25 pm. EDT
- Game weather: 82 °F (28 °C), (Partly Cloudy)
- Game attendance: 71,181
- Referee: Ed Hochuli
- TV announcers (CBS/NFLN): Jim Nantz, Phil Simms and Tracy Wolfson
- Recap, Gamebook

Game information

First quarter

- BAL – 0:27 Owen Daniels 2-yard TD pass from Joe Flacco, Justin Tucker kick. Drive: 12 plays, 85 yards, 6:26. (BAL 7–0)

Second quarter

- BAL – 1:25 Justin Tucker 30-yard FG. Drive: 12 plays, 65 yards, 5:32. (BAL 10–0)
- PIT – 2:50 Shaun Suisham 25-yard FG. Drive: 11 plays, 73 yards, 5:11. (BAL 10–3)

Third quarter

- PIT – 10:30 Shaun Suisham 43-yard FG. Drive: 6 plays, 27 yards, 2:56. (BAL 10–6)
- BAL – 3:58 Owen Daniels 1-yard TD pass from Joe Flacco, Justin Tucker kick. Drive: 12 plays, 80 yards, 6:32. (BAL 17–6)

Fourth quarter

- BAL – 14:11 Justin Tucker 23-yard FG. Drive: 10 plays, 53 yards, 3:51. (BAL 20–6)
- BAL – 11:14 Justin Tucker 22-yard FG. Drive: 6 plays, 16 yards, 2:46. (BAL 23–6)
- BAL – 4:31 Justin Tucker 20-yard FG. Drive: 7 plays, 53 yards, 4:57. (BAL 26–6)

Top passers

- PIT – Ben Roethlisberger 22/37, 217 yards, 1 INT
- BAL – Joe Flacco 21/29, 166 yards, 2 TD

Top rushers

- PIT – Le'Veon Bell 11 rushes, 59 yards
- BAL – Bernard Pierce 22 rushes, 96 yards

Top receivers

- PIT – Antonio Brown 7 reception, 90 yards
- BAL – Steve Smith 6 receptions, 71 yards

Top tacklers

- PIT – Lawrence Timmons 7 tackles, 5 assists
- BAL – Matt Elam 5 tackles, 5 assists

After a close home win over the Browns, the Steelers traveled to Baltimore to take on the Ravens on Thursday Night Football. The Ravens scored first in the first quarter when Joe Flacco found Owen Daniels on a 2-yard TD pass for a 7–0 lead. They increased their lead in the 2nd quarter as Justin Tucker nailed a 30-yard field goal for a 10–0 lead. The Steelers finally got on the board when Shaun Suisham kicked a 25-yard field goal for a 10–3 game at halftime. Returning after the break, the Steelers went back to work and were able to move down the field for Suisham to kick another field goal from 43 yards out to come within 4 with for a 10–6 game. However, the Ravens started to take control later on when Flacco found Daniels again on a 1-yard TD pass making the score 17–6. In the 4th quarter, the Ravens sealed the game with 3 field goals kicked by Tucker from 23, 22, and 20 yards out for a 20–6, 23–6, and 26–6 final score.

The Steelers were held without a touchdown in a game for the first time since their 20–3 loss to the 49ers in 2011. The team dropped to 1–1.

==== Week 3: at Carolina Panthers ====
Week Three: Pittsburgh Steelers at Carolina Panthers – Game summary

Quarter	1	2	3	4	Total
Steelers	3	6	14	14	37
Panthers	3	0	3	13	19

at Bank of America Stadium, Charlotte, North Carolina

- Date: September 21
- Game time: 8:30 pm. EDT
- Game weather: 79 °F (26 °C), (Clear)
- Game attendance: 73,945
- Referee: Ron Torbert
- TV announcers (NBC): Al Michaels, Cris Collinsworth and Michele Tafoya
- Recap, Gamebook

Game information

First quarter

- CAR – 6:45 Graham Gano 40-yard FG. Drive: 9 plays, 58 yards, 3:55 (CAR 3–0)
- PIT – 0:11 Shaun Suisham 42-yard FG. Drive: 6 plays, 51 yards, 2:31 (TIE 3–3)

Second quarter

- PIT – 5:40 Shaun Suisham 24-yard FG. Drive: 16 plays, 87 yards, 8:00 (PIT 6–3)
- PIT – 0:03 Shaun Suisham 45-yard FG. Drive: 7 plays, 53 yards, 1:35 (PIT 9–3)

Third quarter

- PIT – 11:10 Antonio Brown 7-yard TD pass from Ben Roethlisberger, Shaun Suisham kick. Drive: 4 plays, 17 yards, 1:30 (PIT 16–3)
- CAR – 6:26 Graham Gano 40-yard FG. Drive: 12 plays, 58 yards, 4:41 (PIT 16–6)
- PIT – 2:31 Antonio Brown 7-yard TD pass from Ben Roethlisberger, Shaun Suisham kick. Drive: 6 plays, 80 yards, 3:59 (PIT 23–6)

Fourth quarter

- CAR – 13:37 Greg Olsen 37-yard TD pass from Cam Newton, Graham Gano kick. Drive: 7 plays, 80 yards, 3:54 (PIT 23–13)
- PIT – 11:17 Robert Golden fumble recovery in end zone, Shaun Suisham kick. (PIT 30–13)
- PIT – 5:46 LeGarrette Blount 8-yard TD run, Shaun Suisham kick. Drive: 8 plays, 98 yards, 4:29 (PIT 37–13)
- CAR – 4:01 Kelvin Benjamin 35-yard TD pass from Derek Anderson, pass failed. Drive: 6 plays, 80 yards, 1:45 (PIT 37–19)

Top passers

- PIT – Ben Roethlisberger 22/30, 196 yards, 2 TD
- CAR – Cam Newton 24/35, 250 yards, 1 TD

Top rushers

- PIT – Le'Veon Bell 21 rushes, 147 yards
- CAR – Jonathan Stewart 5 rushes, 31 yards

Top receivers

- PIT – Antonio Brown 10 receptions, 90 yards, 2 TD
- CAR – Kelvin Benjamin 8 receptions, 115 yards, 1 TD

Top tacklers

- PIT – Cortez Allen 6 tackles, 1 assist
- CAR – Luke Kuechly 7 tackles, 7 assists

After a rough loss to the Ravens, the Steelers traveled down south to take on the Panthers. In the first quarter, the Panthers scored first when Graham Gano kicked a 40-yard field goal for a 3–0 lead. However, the Steelers were able to tie it up when Shaun Suisham kicked a 42-yard field goal for a 3–3 game. In the 2nd quarter, the Steelers increased their lead with 2 more field goals from 24 and 45 yards out for leads of 6–3 and then 9–3 at halftime. In the 3rd quarter, the Steelers got back to work as Ben Roethlisberger hooked up with Antonio Brown on a 7-yard TD pass for a 16–3 lead. Gano got the Panthers within 10 with another field goal from 40 yards out for a 16–6 game. However, the Steelers pulled away as Roethlisberger found Brown again on a 7-yard TD pass for a 23–6 lead. In the 4th quarter, Cam Newton found Greg Olson on a 37-yard TD Pass coming within 10 23–13. However, the Steelers pulled away as Robert Golden recovered a fumble in the end zone for a 30–13 game. Later on, LaGarrette Blount ran for a 7-yard TD increasing their lead to 37–13. The Panthers tried their hand at coming back but could only come away with 6 points as 2nd-string QB Derek Anderson found Kelvin Benjamin on a 35-yard TD pass (with a failed 2-point conversion) for an eventual final score of 37–19.

With the win, the Steelers improved to 2–1.

==== Week 4: vs. Tampa Bay Buccaneers ====
Week Four: Tampa Bay Buccaneers at Pittsburgh Steelers – Game summary

Quarter	1	2	3	4	Total
Buccaneers	10	0	7	10	27
Steelers	10	7	7	0	24

at Heinz Field, Pittsburgh, Pennsylvania

- Date: September 28
- Game time: 1:00 pm. EDT
- Game weather: 72 °F (22 °C), (Sunny)
- Game attendance: 62,910
- Referee: Walt Anderson
- TV announcers (Fox): Thom Brennaman, David Diehl and Laura Okmin
- Recap, Gamebook

Game information

First quarter

- TB – 13:01 Mike Evans 7-yard TD pass from Mike Glennon, Patrick Murray kick. Drive: 2 plays, 9 yards, 0:44 (TB 7–0)
- TB – 10:01 Patrick Murray 50-yard FG. Drive: 6 plays, 23 yards, 1:24 (TB 10–0)
- PIT – 6:19 Shaun Suisham 25-yard FG. Drive: 10 plays, 73 yards, 3:42 (TB 10–3)
- PIT – 0:15 Antonio Brown 11-yard TD pass from Ben Roethlisberger, Shaun Suisham kick. Drive: 9 plays, 60 yards, 4:43 (TIE 10–10)

Second quarter

- PIT – 4:58 Antonio Brown 27-yard TD pass from Ben Roethlisberger, Shaun Suisham kick. Drive: 13 plays, 93 yards, 7:25 (PIT 17–10)

Third quarter

- TB – 12:27 Doug Martin 3-yard TD run, Patrick Murray kick. Drive: 8 plays, 80 yards, 2:33 (TIE 17–17)
- PIT – 7:50 Heath Miller 5-yard TD pass from Ben Roethlisberger, Shaun Suisham kick. Drive: 10 plays, 80 yards, 4:37 (PIT 24–17)

Fourth quarter

- TB – 11:37 Patrick Murray 27-yard FG. Drive: 12 plays, 83 yards, 4:39 (PIT 24–20)
- TB – 0:07 Vincent Jackson 5-yard TD pass from Mike Glennon, Patrick Murray kick. Drive: 5 plays, 46 yards, 0:33 (TB 27–24)

Top passers

- TB – Mike Glennon 21/42, 302 yards, 2 TD, 1 INT
- PIT – Ben Roethlisberger 29/40, 314 yards, 3 TD

Top rushers

- TB – Doug Martin 14 rushes, 40 yards, 1 TD
- PIT – Le'Veon Bell 19 rushes, 63 yards

Top receivers

- TB – Louis Murphy 6 rececptions, 99 yards
- PIT – Antonio Brown, 7 receptions, 131 yards, 2 TD

Top tacklers

- TB – Lavonte David 10 tackles, 2 assists
- PIT – Lawrence Timmons 7 tackles, 3 assists

After a huge win on the road, the Steelers returned home for a game against the Buccaneers. The Bucs scored first when Mike Glennon found Mike Evans on a 7-yard TD pass for a 7–0 lead. They increased their lead when Patrick Murray kicked a 50-yard field goal for a 10-lead. The Steelers finally got on the board when Shaun Suisham nailed a 25-yard field goal to come within a TD, 10–3 followed by Ben Roethlisberger hooking up with Antonio Brown on an 11-yard TD pass to tie the game up at 10–10. In the 2nd quarter, Roethlisberger found Brown again this time on a 27-yard TD pass to take the lead 17–10 at halftime. After the break, Doug Martin ran for a TD from 3 yards out to tie the game back up, 17–17. The Steelers pulled away as Roethlisberger found Heath Miller on a 5-yard TD pass for a 24–17 lead. In the 4th quarter, the Bucs pulled within 4 when Murray kicked a 27-yard field goal for a 24–20 game. Driving down the field, the Bucs were able to complete the comeback attempt as Glennon found Vincent Jackson on a 5-yard TD pass for a final score of 27–24.

The loss dropped the Steelers to 2–2. The Steelers also recorded their first home loss to the Buccaneers in franchise history. It was also Pittsburgh's first loss to the Buccaneers since 1998.

==== Week 5: at Jacksonville Jaguars ====
Week Five: Pittsburgh Steelers at Jacksonville Jaguars – Game summary

Quarter	1	2	3	4	Total
Steelers	0	10	0	7	17
Jaguars	3	3	3	0	9

at EverBank Field, Jacksonville, Florida

- Date: October 5
- Game time: 1:00 pm. EDT
- Game weather: 71 °F (22 °C), (Mostly Sunny)
- Game attendance: 66,198
- Referee: Terry McAulay
- TV announcers (CBS): Spero Dedes and Solomon Wilcots
- Recap, Gamebook

Game information

First quarter

- JAX – 5:17 Josh Scobee 43-yard FG. Drive: 15 plays, 43 yards, 8:08 (JAX 3–0)

Second quarter

- PIT – 12:35 Shaun Suisham 24-yard FG. Drive: 9 plays, 65 yards, 3:35 (TIE 3–3)
- PIT – 1:53 Michael Palmer 1-yard TD pass from Ben Roethlisberger, Shaun Suisham kick. Drive: 10 plays, 70 yards, 4:53 (PIT 10–3)
- JAX – 0:09 Josh Scobee 35-yard FG. Drive: 10 plays, 58 yards, 1:44 (PIT 10–6)

Third quarter

- JAX – 3:16 Josh Scobee 36-yard FG. Drive: 8 plays, 68 yards, 3:17 (PIT 10–9)

Fourth quarter

- PIT – 11:32 Brice McCain 22-yard interception return, Shaun Suisham kick. Drive: 2 plays, −2 yards, 0:52 (PIT 17–9)

Top passers

- PIT – Ben Roethlisberger 26/36, 273 yards, 1 TD
- JAX – Blake Bortles 22/36, 191 yards, 2 INT

Top rushers

- PIT – Le'Veon Bell 15 rushes, 82 yards
- JAX – Storm Johnson 4 rushes, 27 yards

Top receivers

- PIT – Antonio Brown 5 receptions, 84 yards
- JAX – Allen Robinson 5 receptions, 51 yards

Top tacklers

- PIT – Cortez Allen 7 tackles, 1 INT
- JAX – Paul Posluszny 9 tackles, 3 assists, 1 sack

After a tough home loss, the Steelers traveled down south again to take on the Jaguars. The Jags scored first as Josh Scobee kicked a 43-yard field goal for a 3–0 lead for the only score of the first quarter. The Steelers answered to tie the game when Shaun Suisham kicked a 24-yard field goal for a 3–3 game. They eventually took the lead when Ben Roetlisberger found Michael Palmer on a 1-yard TD pass to take a 10–3 lead. The Jags pulled within 4 before halftime when Scobee nailed a 35-yard field goal to make it a 10–6 game. In the 3rd quarter, the Jags came within a point as Scobee kicked a 36-yard field goal to make it a 10–9 game for the only score of the quarter. In the 4th quarter however, Brice McCain picked off Jags QB Blake Bortles and returned the interception for a 22-yard TD increasing their lead to the eventual final score of 17–9.

With the win, the Steelers improved to 3–2.

==== Week 6: at Cleveland Browns ====
Week Six: Pittsburgh Steelers at Cleveland Browns – Game summary

Quarter	1	2	3	4	Total
Steelers	3	0	0	7	10
Browns	0	21	3	7	31

at FirstEnergy Stadium, Cleveland, Ohio

- Date: October 12
- Game time: 1:00 pm. EDT
- Game weather: 58 °F (14 °C), (Sunny)
- Game attendance: 67,431
- Referee: Pete Morelli
- TV announcers (CBS): Greg Gumbel, Trent Green and Evan Washburn
- Recap, Gamebook

Game information

First quarter

- PIT – 5:09 Shaun Suisham 20-yard FG. Drive: 10 plays, 63 yards, 6:11 (PIT 3–0)

Second quarter

- CLE – 11:45 Isaiah Crowell 5-yard TD run, Billy Cundiff kick. Drive: 5 plays, 68 yards, 1:51 (CLE 7–3)
- CLE – 9:35 Jordan Cameron 51-yard TD pass from Brian Hoyer, Billy Cundiff kick. Drive: 3 plays, 60 yards, 1:08 (CLE 14–3)
- CLE – 2:27 Ben Tate 8-yard TD run, Billy Cundiff kick. Drive: 11 plays, 85 yards, 5:07 (CLE 21–3)

Third quarter

- CLE – 3:23 Billy Cundiff 40-yard FG. Drive: 6 plays, 58 yards, 2:52 (CLE 24–3)

Fourth quarter

- CLE – 12:47 Ben Tate 1-yard TD run, Billy Cundiff kick. Drive: 7 plays, 39 yards, 4:17 (CLE 31–3)
- PIT – 2:36 Lance Moore 26-yard TD pass from Ben Roethlisberger, Shaun Suisham kick. Drive: 5 plays, 74 yards, 1:03 (CLE 31–10)

Top passers

- PIT – Ben Roethlisberger 21/42, 228 yards, 1 TD, 1 INT
- CLE – Brian Hoyer 8/17, 217 yards, 1 TD

Top rushers

- PIT – Le'Veon Bell 18 rushes, 82 yards
- CLE – Ben Tate 25 rushes, 78 yards, 2 TD

Top receivers

- PIT – Antonio Brown 7 receptions, 118 yards
- CLE – Jordan Cameron 3 receptions, 102 yards, 1 TD

Top tacklers

- PIT – Lawrence Timmons 5 tackles, 5 assists
- CLE – Karlos Dansby 5 tackles, 6 assists, 1 sack

The Steelers traveled back up north to Cleveland to take on the Browns. In the first quarter, the Steelers score the only 3 points as Shaun Suisham nailed a 20-yard field goal to take a 3–0 lead. The Browns however scored 21 unanswered points in the 2nd quarter when Isaiah Crowell ran for a 5-yard TD to take a 7–3 lead followed by Brian Hoyer hooking up with Jordan Cameron on a 51-yard TD pass for a 14–3 lead before finally Ben Tate ran for an 8-yard TD and took a 21–3 lead at halftime. The Browns continued their domination day in the 3rd quarter when Billy Cundiff kicked a 40-yard field goal for the only score of that quarter. In the 4th quarter, they sealed the game when Ben Tate ran for a 1-yard TD making the score 31–3. The Steelers drove down the field and Ben Roethlisberger found Lance Moore on a 26-yard TD pass for a final score of 31–10.

With the loss, the Steelers fell to 3–3 and last place in the AFC North.

==== Week 7: vs. Houston Texans ====
Week Seven: Houston Texans at Pittsburgh Steelers – Game summary

Quarter	1	2	3	4	Total
Texans	7	6	0	10	23
Steelers	0	24	0	6	30

at Heinz Field, Pittsburgh, Pennsylvania

- Date: October 20
- Game time: 8:30 pm. EDT
- Game weather: 52 °F (11 °C), (Cloudy)
- Game attendance: 56,375
- Referee: Walt Coleman
- TV announcers (ESPN): Mike Tirico, Jon Gruden and Lisa Salters
- Recap, Gamebook

Game information

First quarter

- HOU – 5:55 Alfred Blue 11-yard TD pass from Ryan Fitzpatrick, Randy Bullock kick. Drive: 10 plays, 94 yards, 5:29 (HOU 7–0)

Second quarter

- HOU – 13:34 Randy Bullock 39-yard FG. Drive: 9 plays, 25 yards, 3:45 (HOU 10–0)
- HOU – 7:16 Randy Bullock 38-yard FG. Drive: 10 plays, 51 yards, 4:40 (HOU 13–0)
- PIT – 3:08 Shaun Suisham 44-yard FG. Drive: 8 plays, 60 yards, 4:08 (HOU 13–3)
- PIT – 1:27 Martavis Bryant 35-yard TD pass from Ben Roethlisberger, Shaun Suisham kick. Drive: 2 plays, 63 yards, 0:19 (HOU 13–10)
- PIT – 1:03 Lance Moore 3-yard TD pass from Antonio Brown, Shaun Suisham kick. Drive: 1 play, 3 yards, 0:07 (PIT 17–13)
- PIT – 0:14 Le'Veon Bell 2-yard TD pass from Ben Roethlisberger, Shaun Suisham kick. Drive: 2 plays, 8 yards, 0:44 (PIT 24–13)

Third quarter

Fourth quarter

- HOU – 11:47 Randy Bullock 31-yard FG. Drive: 9 plays, 61 yards, 2:42 (PIT 24–16)
- PIT – 5:50 Shaun Suisham 30-yard FG. Drive: 10 plays, 70 yards, 5:57 (PIT 27–16)
- PIT – 3:04 Shaun Suisham 40-yard FG. Drive: 6 plays, 17 yards, 1:51 (PIT 30–16)
- HOU – 1:31 Arian Foster 1-yard TD pass from Ryan Fitzpatrick, Randy Bullock kick. Drive: 7 plays, 86 yards, 1:33 (PIT 30–23)

Top passers

- HOU – Ryan Fitzpatrick 21/32, 262 yards, 2 TD, 1 INT
- PIT – Ben Roethlisberger 23/33, 265 yards, 2 TD

Top rushers

- HOU – Arian Foster 20 carries, 102 yards
- PIT – Le'Veon Bell 12 carries, 57 yards

Top receivers

- HOU – DeAndre Hopkins 6 receptions, 108 yards
- PIT – Antonio Brown 9 receptions, 90 yards

Top tacklers

- HOU – Mike Mohamed 5 tackles, 1 assist
- PIT – Lawrence Timmons 11 tackles, 1 assist, 1 sack

Following a terrible loss to the Browns, the Steelers returned home for a duel against the Texans on Monday Night Football. The Texans started out strong when Ryan Fitzpatrick found Alfred Blue on an 11-yard pass for a 7–0 lead and the only score of the first quarter. In the 2nd quarter, the Texans increased their lead as Randy Bullock nailed 2 field goals from 39 and 38 yards out for 10–0 and 13–0 leads. The Steelers finally got on the board and scored 24 unanswered points: first starting with Shaun Suisham who nailed a 44-yard field goal for a 13–3 game followed up by Ben Roethlisberger finding Martavis Bryant on a 35-yard TD pass for a 13–10 game and eventually took the lead on Antonio Brown's 1-yard TD pass to Lance Moore 17–13 and lastly Roethlisberger hooking up with Le'Veon Bell on a 2-yard TD pass for a 24–13 halftime lead. After a scoreless 3rd quarter, the Texans came within 8 as Bullock kicked a 31-yard field goal for a 24–16 game not long before the Steelers responded with 2 of their own from Suisham when he got them from 30 and 40 yards out for leads of 27–16 and 30–16. Finally, Fitzpatrick was able to find Arian Foster on a 1-yard TD pass and this led to the final score of 30–23.

With the win, the Steelers improved to 4–3.

==== Week 8: vs. Indianapolis Colts ====
Week Eight: Indianapolis Colts at Pittsburgh Steelers – Game summary

Quarter	1	2	3	4	Total
Colts	3	17	14	0	34
Steelers	7	28	7	9	51

at Heinz Field, Pittsburgh, Pennsylvania

- Date: October 26
- Game time: 4:25 pm. EDT
- Game weather: 59 °F (15 °C), (Sunny)
- Game attendance: 62,479
- Referee: John Parry
- TV announcers (CBS): Jim Nantz, Phil Simms and Tracy Wolfson
- Recap, Gamebook

Game information

First quarter

- IND – 11:56 Adam Vinatieri 31-yard FG. Drive: 7 plays, 67 yards, 3:04 (IND 3–0)
- PIT – 7:13 Markus Wheaton 18-yard TD pass from Ben Roethlisberger, Shaun Suisham kick. Drive: 9 plays, 80 yards, 4:43 (PIT 7–3)

Second quarter

- PIT – 14:57 Martavis Bryant 5-yard TD pass from Ben Roethlisberger, Shaun Suisham kick. Drive: 12 plays, 76 yards, 6:29 (PIT 14–3)
- PIT – 14:16 William Gay 33-yard interception return, Shaun Suisham kick. Drive: 2 plays, 5 yards, 0:41 (PIT 21–3)
- IND – 11:36 Dwayne Allen 21-yard TD pass from Andrew Luck, Adam Vinatieri kick. Drive: 5 plays, 86 yards, 2:40 (PIT 21–10)
- PIT – 8:33 Antonio Brown 8-yard TD pass from Ben Roethlisberger, Shaun Suisham kick. Drive: 7 plays, 87 yards, 3:03 (PIT 28–10)
- PIT – 5:08 Antonio Brown 47-yard TD pass from Ben Roethlisberger, Shaun Suisham kick. Drive: 4 plays, 77 yards, 2:26 (PIT 35–10)
- IND – 1:56 T. Y. Hilton 28-yard TD pass from Andrew Luck, Adam Vinatieri kick. Drive: 8 plays, 80 yards, 3:12 (PIT 35–17)
- IND – 0:00 Adam Vinatieri 23-yard FG. Drive: 5 plays, 60 yards, 0:35 (PIT 35–20)

Third quarter

- PIT – 9:59 Martavis Bryant 2-yard TD pass from Ben Roethlisberger, Shaun Suisham kick. Drive: 10 plays, 80 yards, 5:01 (PIT 42–20)
- IND – 3:38 Ahmad Bradshaw 12-yard TD run, Adam Vinatieri kick. Drive: 8 plays, 69 yards, 3:06 (PIT 42–27)
- IND – 2:35 Donte Moncrief 31-yard TD pass from Andrew Luck, Adam Vinatieri kick. Drive: 3 plays, 36 yards, 0:51 (PIT 42–34)

Fourth quarter

- PIT – 12:34 Penalty on Andrew Luck enforced in end zone for safety. Drive: 2 plays, −5 yards, 0:10 (PIT 44–34)
- PIT – 5:14 Heath Miller 11-yard TD pass from Ben Roethlisberger, Shaun Suisham kick. Drive: 12 plays, 67 yards, 7:20 (PIT 51–34)

Top passers

- IND – Andrew Luck 26/45, 400 yards, 3 TD, 2 INT
- PIT – Ben Roethlisberger 40/49, 522 yards, 6 TD

Top rushers

- IND – Ahmad Bradshaw 6 rushes, 35 yards, 1 TD
- PIT – Le'Veon Bell 24 rushes, 92 yards

Top receivers

- IND – T. Y. Hilton 6 receptions, 155 yards, 1 TD
- PIT – Antonio Brown 10 receptions, 133 yards, 2 TD

Top tacklers

- IND – D'Qwell Jackson 8 tackles, 5 assists
- PIT – William Gay 6 tackles, 2 assists, 1 INT, 1 TD

After a tough win over the Texans, the Steelers stayed home for a game against the Colts. In the first quarter, the Colts scored first as Adam Vinatieri nailed a 31-yard field goal for a 3–0 lead. However, the Steelers took the lead later on in the quarter when Ben Roethlisberger found Markus Wheaton on an 18-yard TD pass for a 7–3 game. In the 2nd quarter, the Steelers would score again increasing their lead as Roethlisberger found Martavis Bryant on a 5-yard TD pass for a 14–3 game. This was followed by William Gay picking off Andrew Luck and returning it 33 yards for a TD as they increased their lead to 21–3. The Colts however responded as Andrew Luck threw a 21-yard TD pass to Dwayne Allen for a 21–10 game. However, the Steelers pulled away as Roethlisberger would find Antonio Brown on 2 consecutive TD passes: from 8 and 47 yards out to increase their lead at first from 28–10 to 35–10. The Colts responded with 10 straight points first being Luck who found T. Y. Hilton on a 28-yard TD Pass for a 35–17 game followed by Vinatieri kicking a 23-yard field goal before halftime to make the score 35–20. The Steelers went back to work in the 3rd quarter as Roethlisberger and Bryant hooked up again on a 2-yard TD pass to increase their lead making the score 42–20. The Colts however were able to come within 8 later on when Ahmad Bradshaw ran for a 12-yard TD followed by Luck finding Donte Moncrief on a 31-yard TD pass to make the score 42–27 and then 42–34. In the 4th quarter, it was all Steelers when a penalty was enforced on Luck in the end zone for a safety making the score 44–34. The Steelers were able to seal the game later on when Roethlisberger found Heath Miller on an 11-yard TD pass for a final score of 51–34.

With the win, the Steelers improved to 5–3.

Roethlisberger set franchise records with 522 yards passing and six touchdowns while picking up his 100th victory in his 150th start. Roethlisberger's yardage total was the fourth highest in NFL history. He became the first player in NFL history to go over 500 yards passing twice as the Steelers won consecutive games for the first time this season.

==== Week 9: vs. Baltimore Ravens ====
Week Nine: Baltimore Ravens at Pittsburgh Steelers – Game summary

Quarter	1	2	3	4	Total
Ravens	7	3	0	13	23
Steelers	0	22	0	21	43

at Heinz Field, Pittsburgh, Pennsylvania

- Date: November 2
- Game time: 8:30 pm. EST
- Game weather: 37 °F (3 °C), (Clear)
- Game attendance: 63,971
- Referee: Bill Vinovich
- TV announcers (NBC): Al Michaels, Cris Collinsworth and Michele Tafoya
- Recap, Gamebook

Game information

First quarter

- BAL – 9:41 Torrey Smith 35-yard TD pass from Joe Flacco, Justin Tucker kick. Drive: 1 play, 35 yards, 0:06 (BAL 7–0)

Second quarter

- PIT – 7:18 Le'Veon Bell 5-yard TD pass from Ben Roethlisberger, Shaun Suisham kick. Drive: 5 plays, 27 yards, 1:56 (TIE 7–7)
- PIT – 5:24 Martavis Bryant 19-yard TD pass from Ben Roethlisberger, Shaun Suisham kick. Drive: 3 plays, 30 yards, 1:31 (PIT 14–7)
- BAL – 1:44 Justin Tucker 46-yard FG. Drive: 10 plays, 49 yards, 3:40 (PIT 14–10)
- PIT – 0:53 Markus Wheaton 47-yard TD pass from Ben Roethlisberger, Brad Wing pass to Matt Spaeth for 2-point conversion. Drive: 5 plays, 80 yards, 0:51 (PIT 22–10)

Third quarter

Fourth quarter

- PIT – 14:01 Antonio Brown 54-yard TD pass from Ben Roethlisberger, Shaun Suisham kick. Drive: 7 plays, 85 yards, 3:38 (PIT 29–10)
- BAL – 13:47 Jacoby Jones 108-yard kickoff return, Justin Tucker kick. Drive: 0 plays, 0 yards, 0:14 (PIT 29–17)
- PIT – 9:31 Martavis Bryant 18-yard TD pass from Ben Roethlisberger, Shaun Suisham kick. Drive: 9 plays, 71 yards, 4:16 (PIT 36–17)
- BAL – 2:58 Crockett Gillmore 1-yard TD pass from Joe Flacco, 2-point run conversion failed. Drive: 9 plays, 33 yards, 2:35 (PIT 36–23)
- PIT – 1:51 Matt Spaeth 33-yard TD pass from Ben Roethlisberger, Shaun Suisham kick. Drive: 4 plays, 41 yards, 1:07 (PIT 43–23)

Top passers

- BAL – Joe Flacco 30/45, 303 yards, 2 TD, 1 INT
- PIT – Ben Roethlisberger 25/37, 340 yards, 6 TD

Top rushers

- BAL – Justin Forsett 9 carries, 38 yards
- PIT – LeGarrette Blount 10 carries, 23 yards

Top receivers

- BAL – Justin Forsett 5 receptions, 67 yards
- PIT – Antonio Brown 11 receptions, 144 yards, 1 TD

Top tacklers

- BAL – Daryl Smith 7 tackles, 2 assists
- PIT – Lawrence Timmons 7 tackles, 4 assists, 1 sack

The Steelers stayed home for a 3-game home stand and for a Sunday Night duel against the Ravens. The Ravens scored first when Joe Flacco hooked up with Torrey Smith 35-yard TD pass to take a 7–0 lead for the only score of the first quarter. In the 2nd quarter, the Steelers managed to tie the game up when Ben Roethlisberger found Le'Veon Bell on a 5-yard TD pass for a 7–7 game. They eventually took the lead when Roethlisberger found Martavis Bryant on a 19-yard TD pass to make it a 14–7 game. The Ravens came within 4 as Justin Tucker kicked a 46-yard field goal to make it 14–10 game. However, the Steelers would manage to go ahead by 12 before halftime when Roethlisberger found Markus Wheaton on a 47-yard TD pass followed by a successful 2-point conversion for a 22–10 lead at halftime. After a scoreless 3rd quarter, the Steelers came out strong and went back to work in the 4th when Roethlisberger found Antonio Brown on a 54-yard TD pass making the score 29–10. The Ravens responded with a big play as Jacoby Jones ran a 108-yard kickoff return for a TD to make it a 29–17 game. Roethlisberger found Bryant again on an 18-yard TD pass to make the score 36–17. This was followed by the Ravens trying their hand at coming back when Flacco found Crockett Gillmore on a 1-yard TD pass (with a failed 2-point conversion) for a 36–23 score. But the Steelers were able to seal the game when Roethlisberger found Matt Spaeth on a 33-yard TD pass for a final score of 43–23, to give each team 49 points in their two meetings. The Ravens would Peter Jackson the series in the playoffs.

With the win, the Steelers improved to 6–3.

A week after passing for a franchise-record six touchdowns against Indianapolis, Roethlisberger duplicated the feat to lead Pittsburgh to its third consecutive win. The 12 touchdown passes over the last two games broke the NFL record of 11 set by Tom Flores for Oakland in the AFL in 1963 and matched by New England's Tom Brady in 2007.

==== Week 10: at New York Jets ====
Week Ten: Pittsburgh Steelers at New York Jets – Game summary

Quarter	1	2	3	4	Total
Steelers	0	3	0	10	13
Jets	17	0	3	0	20

at MetLife Stadium, East Rutherford, New Jersey

- Date: November 9
- Game time: 1:00 pm. EST
- Game weather: 58 °F (14 °C), (Sunny)
- Game attendance: 78,160
- Referee: Terry McAulay
- TV announcers (CBS): Kevin Harlan, Rich Gannon and Otis Livingston
- Recap, Gamebook

Game information

First quarter

- NYJ – 7:08 Nick Folk 23-yard FG. Drive: 14 plays, 72 yards, 7:52 (NYJ 3–0)
- NYJ – 3:20 T. J. Graham 67-yard TD pass from Michael Vick, Nick Folk kick. Drive: 1 plays, 67 yards, 0:10 (NYJ 10–0)
- NYJ – 0:19 Jace Amaro 5-yard TD pass from Michael Vick, Nick Folk kick. Drive: 5 plays, 20 yards, 2:49 (NYJ 17–0)

Second quarter

- PIT – 0:00 Shaun Suisham 53-yard FG. Drive: 6 plays, 30 yards, 0:51 (NYJ 17–3)

Third quarter

- NYJ – 4:34 Nick Folk 30-yard FG. Drive: 10 plays, 48 yards, 4:12 (NYJ 20–3)

Fourth quarter

- PIT – 7:21 Shaun Suisham 27-yard FG. Drive: 13 plays, 46 yards, 5:59 (NYJ 20–6)
- PIT – 1:16 Martavis Bryant 80-yard TD pass from Ben Roethlisberger, Shaun Suisham kick. Drive: 1 play, 80 yards, 0:12 (NYJ 20–13)

Top passers

- PIT – Ben Roethlisberger 30/43, 343 yards, 1 TD, 2 INT
- NYJ – Michael Vick 10/18, 132 yards, 2 TD

Top rushers

- PIT – Le'Veon Bell 11 carries, 36 yards
- NYJ – Chris Ivory 14 carries, 51 yards

Top receivers

- PIT – Martavis Bryant 4 receptions, 143 yards, 1 TD
- NYJ – T. J. Graham 1 reception, 67 yards, 1 TD

Top tacklers

- PIT – Lawrence Timmons 7 tackles, 6 assists
- NYJ – Demario Davis 11 tackles, 1 assist

The Steelers then traveled further east to take on the Michael Vick-led Jets. The Jets scored in the first quarter when Nick Folk scored a 23-yard field goal for a 3–0 lead. This was followed by 2 touchdowns by the Jets as Michael Vick found T. J. Graham and Jace Amaro on 67-yard and 5-yard TDs for scores of 10–0 and 17–0. The Steelers got on the board before halftime as Shaun Suisham nailed a 53-yard field goal for a 17–3 halftime score. In the 3rd quarter, the Jets went back to work as Folk scored a 30-yard field goal for a 20–3 game. The Steelers would then score 10 points in the 4th quarter: Suisham's 27-yard field goal to get within 2 TDs followed by Ben Roethlisberger hooking up with Martavis Bryant on an 80-yard TD pass to come within a TD. The Jets got the ball back and Vick took knees to end the game with a final score of 20–13. With the loss, the Steelers dropped to 6–4.

The Jets had forced 4 takeaways against the Steelers. Ben who had thrown 12 touchdowns and no picks in the 2 games before this one had thrown only 1 touchdown pass and threw 2 interceptions. On a positive note, Roethlisberger had thrown 13 touchdown passes and 2 interceptions in the last 3 games alone.

==== Week 11: at Tennessee Titans ====
Week Eleven: Pittsburgh Steelers at Tennessee Titans – Game summary

Quarter	1	2	3	4	Total
Steelers	13	0	0	14	27
Titans	7	10	7	0	24

at LP Field, Nashville, Tennessee

- Date: November 17
- Game time: 8:30 pm. EST/7:30 p.m. CST
- Game weather: 25 °F (−4 °C), (Cloudy)
- Game attendance: 69,143
- Referee: Brad Allen
- TV announcers (ESPN): Mike Tirico, Jon Gruden and Lisa Salters
- Recap, Gamebook

Game information

First quarter

- PIT – 10:45 Shaun Suisham 49-yard FG. Drive: 7 plays, 37 yards, 4:15 (PIT 3–0)
- PIT – 10:37 William Gay 28-yard interception return, Shaun Suisham kick. Drive: 1 play, 0 yards, 0:08 (PIT 10–0)
- TEN – 8:08 Bishop Sankey 9-yard TD run, Ryan Succop kick. Drive: 5 plays, 67 yards, 2:29 (PIT 10–7)
- PIT – 1:03 Shaun Suisham 23-yard FG. Drive: 14 plays, 85 yards, 7:05 (PIT 13–7)

Second quarter

- TEN – 11:12 Ryan Succop 20-yard FG. Drive: 9 plays, 58 yards, 4:51 (PIT 13–10)
- TEN – 0:32 Nate Washington 80-yard TD pass from Zach Mettenberger, Ryan Succop kick. Drive: 1 play, 80 yards, 0:12 (TEN 17–13)

Third quarter

- TEN – 3:42 Chase Coffman 4-yard TD pass from Zach Mettenberger, Ryan Succop kick. Drive: 11 plays, 77 yards, 5:16 (TEN 24–13)

Fourth quarter

- PIT – 14:51 Le'Veon Bell 5-yard TD run, Shaun Suisham kick. Drive: 8 plays, 72 yards, 3:51 (TEN 24–20)
- PIT – 9:01 Antonio Brown 12-yard TD pass from Ben Roethlisberger, Shaun Suisham kick. Drive: 8 plays, 65 yards, 4:02 (PIT 27–24)

Top passers

- PIT – Ben Roethlisberger 21/32, 207 yards, 1 TD, 1 INT
- TEN – Zach Mettenberger 15/24, 263 yards, 2 TD, 1 INT

Top rushers

- PIT – Le'Veon Bell 33 carries, 204 yards, 1 TD
- TEN – Bishop Sankey 11 carries, 38 yards, 1 TD

Top receivers

- PIT – Antonio Brown 9 receptions, 91 yards, 1 TD
- TEN – Nate Washington 1 reception, 80 yards, 1 TD

Top tacklers

- PIT – Vince Williams 4 tackles, 3 assists
- TEN – George Wilson 7 tackles, 1 assist

After a tough loss to the Jets, the Steelers traveled to LP Field to take on the Titans. In the first quarter, the Steelers scored first when Shaun Suisham kicked a 49-yard field goal for a 3–0 lead. They increased their lead as William Gay picked off Zach Mettenberger and returned it 28 yards for a TD for a 10–0 lead. The Titans finally got on the board when Bishop Sankey ran for a 9-yard TD for a 10–7 game. However, the Steelers pulled away as Suisham kicked another field goal from 23 yards out for a 13–7 lead. In the 2nd quarter, it was all Titans when Ryan Succop kicked a 20-yard field goal to come within 3, 13–10. They eventually took the lead when Mettenberger found Nate Washington on an 80-yard TD pass and led the game 17–13 at halftime. After the break, the Titans went back to work in the 3rd quarter with Mettenberger finding Chase Coffman on a 4-yard TD pass for a 24–13. In the 4th quarter, the Steelers staged a comeback when Le'Veon Bell ran for a 5-yard TD to come within 4, 24–20. Then Roethlisberger found Antonio Brown on a 12-yard TD pass later on in the quarter to retake the lead 27–24. The defense was able to hold off the Titans offense and recovered the onside kick with less than 2 minutes remaining, sending the Steelers to 7–4 going into their bye week.

Le'Veon Bell ran for 204 yards, an NFL high for a single game so far in 2014. It was also the best game by a Steelers running back since 2010. This was the Steelers' only game outside of the Eastern Time Zone time zone during the 2014 season.

==== Week 13: vs. New Orleans Saints ====
Week Thirteen: New Orleans Saints at Pittsburgh Steelers – Game summary

Quarter	1	2	3	4	Total
Saints	0	14	14	7	35
Steelers	3	3	7	19	32

at Heinz Field, Pittsburgh, Pennsylvania

- Date: November 30
- Game time: 1:00 pm. EST
- Game weather: 61 °F (16 °C), (Cloudy)
- Game attendance: 61,916
- Referee: Pete Morelli
- TV announcers (Fox): Thom Brennaman, Donovan McNabb and Charissa Thompson
- Recap, Gamebook

Game information

First quarter

- PIT – 6:05 Shaun Suisham 49-yard FG. Drive: 7 plays, 34 yards, 3:37 (PIT 3–0)

Second quarter

- PIT – 14:05 Shaun Suisham 31-yard FG. Drive: 13 plays, 60 yards, 6:00 (PIT 6–0)
- NO – 6:04 Benjamin Watson 15-yard TD pass from Drew Brees, Shayne Graham kick. Drive: 8 plays, 79 yards, 3:43 (NO 7-6)
- NO – 0:36 Erik Lorig 4-yard TD pass from Drew Brees, Shayne Graham kick. Drive: 9 plays, 80 yards, 3:46 (NO 14-6)

Third quarter

- NO – 11:25 Nick Toon 11-yard TD pass from Drew Brees, Shayne Graham kick. Drive: 2 plays, 15 yards, 0:43 (NO 21-6)
- PIT – 4:21 Le'Veon Bell 1-yard TD run, Shaun Suisham kick. Drive: 13 plays, 83 yards, 7:04 (NO 21-13)
- NO – 1:50 Kenny Stills 69-yard TD pass from Drew Brees, Shayne Graham kick. Drive: 5 plays, 89 yards, 2:31 (NO 28-13)

Fourth quarter

- PIT – 14:52 Shaun Suisham 47-yard FG. Drive: 5 plays, 44 yards, 1:58 (NO 28–16)
- NO – 10:25 Marques Colston 3-yard TD pass from Drew Brees, Shayne Graham kick. Drive: 9 plays, 80 yards, 4:27 (NO 35-16)
- PIT – 2:34 Antonio Brown 4-yard TD pass from Ben Roethlisberger, Ben Roethlisberger pass to Antonio Brown for 2-point conversion. Drive: 13 plays, 95 yards, 3:20 (NO 35-24)
- PIT – 0:00 Antonio Brown 3-yard TD pass from Ben Roethlisberger, Ben Roethlisberger pass to Lance Moore for 2-point conversion. Drive: 5 plays, 98 yards, 1:02 (NO 35-32)

Top passers

- NO – Drew Brees 19/27, 257 yards, 5 TD
- PIT – Ben Roethlisberger 32/58, 435 yards, 2 TD, 2 INT

Top rushers

- NO – Mark Ingram II 23 carries, 122 yards
- PIT – Le'Veon Bell 21 carries, 95 yards, 1 TD

Top receivers

- NO – Kenny Stills 5 receptions, 162 yards, 1 TD
- PIT – Le'Veon Bell 8 receptions, 159 yards

Top tacklers

- NO – David Hawthorne 10 tackles
- PIT – Jason Worilds 5 tackles, 5 assists, 1 sack

Coming off of their bye week, the Steelers traveled back home to take on the Saints. In the first quarter, the Steelers scored when Shaun Suisham nailed a 49-yard field goal for a 3–0 lead for the only score. They increased their lead when Suisham kicked a 31-yard field goal for a 6–0 game. The Saints took the lead as Drew Brees found Benjamein Watson on a 15-yard TD pass for a 7–6 game. This was followed up by Brees finding Eric Long on a 4-yard pass for a 14–6 halftime lead. After the break, the Saints got back to work as Brees found Nick Toon on an 11-yard TD pass to go ahead 21–6. The Steelers were able to pull within 8 as Le'Veon Bell ran for a 1-yard TD for a 21–13 game. The Saints pulled away as Brees found Kenny Stills on a 69-yard TD pass for a 28–13 game. In the 4th quarter, the Steelers scored another field goal thanks to Suisham kicking it from 47 yards out for a 28–16 game. However, the Saints pulled away as Brees hooked up with Marques Coltson on a 3-yard TD pass for a 35–16 game. Ben Roethlisberger would throw his 2 touchdowns of the whole game both to Antonio Brown as time expired from 4 and 3 yards out with successful 2-point conversions tacked on with scores of 35–24 and a final score of 35–32.

With the loss, the Steelers dropped to 7–5.

==== Week 14: at Cincinnati Bengals ====
Week Fourteen: Pittsburgh Steelers at Cincinnati Bengals – Game summary

Quarter	1	2	3	4	Total
Steelers	0	10	7	25	42
Bengals	0	14	7	0	21

at Paul Brown Stadium, Cincinnati, Ohio

- Date: December 7
- Game time: 1:00 pm. EST
- Game weather: 39 °F (4 °C), (Cloudy)
- Game attendance: 65,512
- Referee: Tony Corrente
- TV announcers (CBS): Ian Eagle, Dan Fouts and Jenny Dell
- Recap, Gamebook

Game information

First quarter

Second quarter

- PIT – 11:17 Heath Miller 1-yard TD pass from Ben Roethlisberger, Shaun Suisham kick. Drive: 9 plays, 75 yards, 4:29 (PIT 7–0)
- CIN – 9:06 Jermaine Gresham 10-yard TD pass from Andy Dalton, Mike Nugent kick. Drive: 5 plays, 80 yards, 2:11 (TIE 7–7)
- CIN – 2:57 Andy Dalton 20-yard TD run, Mike Nugent kick. Drive: 10 plays, 80 yards, 4:45 (CIN 14–7)
- PIT – 0:11 Shaun Suisham 22-yard FG. Drive: 12 plays, 81 yards, 2:46 (CIN 14–10)

Third quarter

- PIT – 5:24 Le'Veon Bell 10-yard TD pass from Ben Roethlisberger, Shaun Suisham kick. Drive: 10 plays, 80 yards, 5:46 (PIT 17–14)
- CIN – 0:00 A. J. Green 81-yard TD pass from Andy Dalton, Mike Nugent kick. Drive: 2 plays, 84 yards, 0:50 (CIN 21–17)

Fourth quarter

- PIT – 13:32 Shaun Suisham 44-yard FG. Drive: 5 plays, 54 yards, 1:28 (CIN 21–20)
- PIT – 11:27 Le'Veon Bell 13-yard TD run, Ben Roethlisberger pass to Heath Miller for 2-point conversion. Drive: 4 plays, 24 yards, 1:18 (PIT 28–21)
- PIT – 8:31 Martavis Bryant 94-yard TD pass from Ben Roethlisberger, Shaun Suisham kick. Drive: 1 play, 94 yards, 0:12 (PIT 35–21)
- PIT – 5:09 Le'Veon Bell 22-yard TD run, Shaun Suisham kick. Drive: 6 play, 50 yards, 2:19 (PIT 42–21)

Top passers

- PIT – Ben Roethlisberger 25/39, 350 yards, 3 TD
- CIN – Andy Dalton 21/29, 302 yards, 2 TD

Top rushers

- PIT – Le'Veon Bell 26 carries, 185 yards, 2 TD
- CIN – Jeremy Hill 8 carries, 46 yards

Top receivers

- PIT – Antonio Brown 9 receptions, 117 yards
- CIN – A. J. Green 11 receptions, 224 yards, 1 TD

Top tacklers

- PIT – Ike Taylor 6 tackles, 1 assist
- CIN – Vincent Rey 6 tackles, 9 assists

After a tough loss at home, the Steelers traveled to Cincinnati to take on the Bengals. After a scoreless first quarter, the Steelers were the first to score in the 2nd when Ben Roethlisberger found Heath Miller on a 1-yard TD pass for a 7–0 lead. Afterwards, the Bengals would tie it at 7–7 when Andy Dalton hooked up with Jermaine Gresham on a 10-yard TD pass. They took the lead when Dalton ran for a 20-yard TD himself for a 14–7 game. The Steelers wrapped up the scoring of the first half coming within 4 when Shaun Suisham kicked a 22-yard field goal for a 14–10 game at halftime. The Steelers retook the lead in the 3rd quarter when Roethlisberger found Le'Veon Bell on a 10-yard TD pass for a 17–14 game. However, the Bengals took the lead back when Dalton found A. J. Green on an 81-yard TD pass to make the score 21–17. In the 4th quarter, it was all Steelers when they scored 25 consecutive points: First coming within 1 as Suisham kicked a 44-yard field goal for a 21–20 game followed by 3 straight touchdowns: Le'Veon Bell ran for a 13-yard TD with a successful 2-point conversion as they retook the lead 28–21, followed by Roethlisberger finding Martavis Bryant on a 94-yard TD pass to move ahead 35–21 and finally Bell ran for another TD from 22 yards out for the eventual final score of 42–21.

With the win, the Steelers improved to 8–5, improving their playoff hopes.

==== Week 15: at Atlanta Falcons ====
Week Fifteen: Pittsburgh Steelers at Atlanta Falcons – Game summary

Quarter	1	2	3	4	Total
Steelers	6	14	0	7	27
Falcons	0	7	6	7	20

at Georgia Dome, Atlanta, Georgia

- Date: December 14
- Game time: 1:00 pm. EST
- Game weather: Dome
- Game attendance: 71,161
- Referee: Clete Blakeman
- TV announcers (CBS): Greg Gumbel, Trent Green and Evan Washburn
- Recap, Gamebook

Game information

First quarter

- PIT – 9:09 Shaun Suisham 38-yard FG. Drive: 10 plays, 60 yards, 5:51 (PIT 3–0)
- PIT – 0:02 Shaun Suisham 38-yard FG. Drive: 9 plays, 72 yards, 5:02 (PIT 6–0)

Second quarter

- PIT – 14:46 William Gay 52-yard interception return, Shaun Suisham kick. Drive: 1 play, 0 yards, 0:16 (PIT 13–0)
- ATL – 4:19 Devin Hester 17-yard TD pass from Matt Ryan, Matt Bryant kick. Drive: 9 plays, 85 yards, 5:29 (PIT 13–7)
- PIT – 0:27 Le'Veon Bell 1-yard TD run, Shaun Suisham kick. Drive: 12 plays, 80 yards, 3:52 (PIT 20–7)

Third quarter

- ATL – 11:00 Matt Bryant 28-yard FG. Drive: 6 plays, 70 yards, 4:00 (PIT 20–10)
- ATL – 2:40 Matt Bryant 22-yard FG. Drive: 13 plays, 75 yards, 6:04 (PIT 20–13)

Fourth quarter

- PIT – 14:11 Le'Veon Bell 13-yard TD run, Shaun Suisham kick. Drive: 6 plays, 80 yards, 3:29 (PIT 27–13)
- ATL – 4:19 Roddy White 4-yard TD pass from Matt Ryan, Matt Bryant kick. Drive: 10 plays, 84 yards, 3:50 (PIT 27–20)

Top passers

- PIT – Ben Roethlisberger 27/35, 360 yards
- ATL – Matt Ryan 26/37, 310 yards, 2 TD, 1 INT

Top rushers

- PIT – Le'Veon Bell 20 carries, 47 yards, 2 TD
- ATL – Steven Jackson 11 carries, 46 yards

Top receivers

- PIT – Antonio Brown 10 receptions, 123 yards
- ATL – Harry Douglas 10 receptions, 131 yards

Top tacklers

- PIT – William Gay 8 tackles, 1 INT, 1 TD
- ATL – Paul Worrilow 5 tackles, 6 assists

After a huge win over the Bengals, the Steelers traveled down south to take on the Falcons. In the first quarter, it was all Steelers as Shaun Suisham scored 2 38-yard field goals for 3–0 and 6–0 leads. In the 2nd quarter, the Steelers would increase their lead when William Gay picked off Matt Ryan and returned the interception 51 yards for a TD for a 13–0 game. The Falcons finally got on the board when Ryan found Devin Hester on a 17-yard TD pass to shorten the lead to 13–7. Le'Veon Bell would wrap up the scoring before halftime with a 1-yard run for a 20–7 halftime lead. In the 3rd quarter, it was all Falcons as Matt Bryant kicked 2 field goals: from 28 and 22 yards out to shorten the lead to 20–10 then 20–13. The Steelers however managed to pull away in the 4th quarter when Bell ran for a 13-yard TD for a 27–13 game. The Falcons tried their hand at coming back when Ryan found Roddy White on a 4-yard TD pass for a 27–20 game. With minutes left, the Steelers recovered the onside kick and moved down the field. Ben Roethlisberger took knees to end the game with that final score.

With the win, the Steelers improved to 9–5 and endured their first winning season since 2011.

Ben Roethlisberger set a new Steelers franchise passing yardage record, surpassing his previous franchise record from 2009. He also became the sixth QB in NFL history to record a win against all other teams in the NFL. Le'Veon Bell also broke the Steelers franchise record of yards from scrimmage, breaking the mark held by Barry Foster. William Gay also set a new Steelers franchise record when he recorded his third interception return for a touchdown on the year.

==== Week 16: vs. Kansas City Chiefs ====
Week Sixteen: Kansas City Chiefs at Pittsburgh Steelers – Game summary

Quarter	1	2	3	4	Total
Chiefs	3	3	0	6	12
Steelers	3	7	7	3	20

at Heinz Field, Pittsburgh, Pennsylvania

- Date: December 21
- Game time: 1:00 pm. EST
- Game weather: 32 °F (0 °C), (Sunny)
- Game attendance: 60,865
- Referee: Ron Torbert
- TV announcers (CBS): Greg Gumbel, Trent Green and Evan Washburn
- Recap, Gamebook

Game information

First quarter

- PIT – Shaun Suisham 23-yard field goal, 9:19. Steelers 3–0. Drive: 11 plays, 80 yards, 5:45.
- KC – Cairo Santos 35-yard field goal, 2:09. Tied 3–3. Drive: 14 plays, 65 yards, 7:09.

Second quarter

- KC – Cairo Santos 25-yard field goal, 9:29. Chiefs 6–3. Drive: 12 plays, 44 yards, 6:10.
- PIT – Le'Veon Bell 1-yard run (Shaun Suisham kick), 4:22. Steelers 10–6. Drive: 11 plays, 80 yards, 5:07.

Third quarter

- PIT – Antonio Brown 3-yard pass from Ben Roethlisberger (Shaun Suisham kick), 0:39. Steelers 17–6. Drive: 10 plays, 75 yards, 5:52.

Fourth quarter

- KC – Cairo Santos 43-yard field goal, 10:23. Steelers 17–9. Drive: 12 plays, 58 yards, 5:16.
- PIT – Shaun Suisham 23-yard field goal, 4:09. Steelers 20–9. Drive: 12 plays, 70 yards, 6:14.
- KC – Cairo Santos 23-yard field goal, 1:40. Steelers 20–12. Drive: 11 plays, 45 yards, 2:27.

Top passers

- KC – Alex Smith – 31/45, 311 yards
- PIT – Ben Roethlisberger – 18/25, 220 yards, TD

Top rushers

- KC – Jamaal Charles – 9 rushes, 29 yards
- PIT – Le'Veon Bell – 20 rushes, 63 yards, TD

Top receivers

- KC – Albert Wilson – 5 receptions, 87 yards
- PIT – Antonio Brown – 7 receptions, 72 yards, TD

Top tacklers

- KC – Josh Mauga – 4 tackles, 2 assists
- PIT – Lawrence Timmons – 9 tackles, 4 assists

After a close win against the Falcons, the Steelers returned home for a game against the Chiefs. They were facing a WIN AND IN scenario for the playoffs. They would score first in the first quarter when Shaun Suisham kicked a 23-yard field goal for a 3–0 lead. The Chiefs managed to tie it up later on in the quarter when Cairo Santos nailed a 35-yard field goal for a 3–3 game. The Chiefs took the lead in the 2nd quarter when Santos kicked a 25-yard field goal for a 6–3 game. The Steelers later on in the quarter retook the lead as Le'Veon Bell ran for a 1-yard TD for a halftime score of 10–6. After the break, the Steelers got back to work in the 3rd quarter as Ben Roethlisberger found Antonio Brown on a 3-yard TD pass for a 17–6 game. In the 4th quarter, the Chiefs came within 8 when Santos kicked another field goal from 43 yards out for a 17–9 game. The Steelers however pulled away as Suisham kicked a 20-yard field goal for a 20–9 game. Santos would later on kick a 23-yard field goal for the eventual final score of 20–12.

With the win, the Steelers improved to 10–5 and earned their first playoff berth since 2011.

Antonio Brown finished the game with 122 catches on the season, the third-highest single-season total in league history while Jamaal Charles was held to his second-lowest rushing total of the season.

==== Week 17: vs. Cincinnati Bengals ====
Week Seventeen: Cincinnati Bengals at Pittsburgh Steelers – Game summary

Quarter	1	2	3	4	Total
Bengals	7	3	0	7	17
Steelers	7	13	0	7	27

at Heinz Field, Pittsburgh, Pennsylvania

- Date: December 28
- Game time: 8:30 pm. EST
- Game weather: 35 °F (2 °C), (Cloudy)
- Game attendance: 64,697
- Referee: Ed Hochuli
- TV announcers (NBC): Al Michaels, Cris Collinsworth and Michele Tafoya
- Recap, Gamebook

Game information

First quarter

- PIT – 10:50 Antonio Brown 71-yard punt return, Shaun Suisham kick. Drive: 3 plays, 8 yards, 1:42 (PIT 7–0)
- CIN – 2:43 Giovani Bernard 17-yard TD pass from Andy Dalton, Mike Nugent kick. Drive: 7 plays, 42 yards, 4:01 (TIE 7–7)

Second quarter

- CIN – 12:32 Mike Nugent 39-yard FG. Drive: 7 plays, 13 yards, 3:09 (CIN 10–7)
- PIT – 7:36 Shaun Suisham 29-yard FG. Drive: 9 plays, 69 yards, 4:56 (TIE 10–10)
- PIT – 5:52 Martavis Bryant 21-yard TD pass from Ben Roethlisberger, Shaun Suisham kick. Drive: 2 play, 28 yards, 0:46 (PIT 17–10)
- PIT – 0:40 Shaun Suisham 25-yard FG. Drive: 11 plays, 70 yards, 1:37 (PIT 20–10)

Third quarter

Fourth quarter

- CIN – 11:14 Jermaine Gresham 5-yard TD pass from Andy Dalton, Mike Nugent kick. Drive: 15 plays, 89 yards, 7:29 (PIT 20–17)
- PIT – 2:50 Antonio Brown 63-yard TD pass from Ben Roethlisberger, Shaun Suisham kick. Drive: 3 plays, 70 yards, 1:01 (PIT 27–17)

Top passers

- CIN – Andy Dalton 27/38, 244 yards, 2 TD, 2 INT
- PIT – Ben Roethlisberger 24/38, 317 yards, 2 TD, 1 INT

Top rushers

- CIN – Jeremy Hill 23 carries, 100 yards
- PIT – Le'Veon Bell 8 carries, 20 yards

Top receivers

- CIN – A. J. Green 8 receptions, 82 yards
- PIT – Antonio Brown 7 receptions, 128 yards, 1 TD

Top tacklers

- CIN – George Iloka 4 tackles, 3 assists
- PIT – Lawrence Timmons 7 tackles, 4 assists

After clinching a playoff spot, the Steelers stayed for a Sunday Night Football duel against the Bengals with the AFC North division title on the line with them also riding a 3-game winning streak.

In the first quarter, the Steelers took an early lead when Antonio Brown ran a punt return 71 yards for a touchdown for a 7–0 game. The Bengals tied it up when Andy Dalton found Giovani Bernard on a 17-yard TD pass for a 7–7 game. The Bengals took the lead in the 2nd quarter when Mike Nugent kicked a 39-yard field goal for a 10–7 game. But the Steelers managed to tie the game up 10–10 when Shaun Suisham kicked a 29-yard field goal. This was followed up by the Steelers retaking the lead as Ben Roethlisberger found Martavis Bryant on a 21-yard TD pass for a 17–10 lead followed by Suisham kicking another field goal from 25 yards out for a 20–10 halftime lead. After a scoreless 3rd quarter, both teams traded touchdowns in the 4th: Dalton found Jermaine Gresham on a 4-yard pass to shorten the lead to 20–17, but the Steelers pulled away as Roethlisberger found Brown on a 63-yard pass to seal the game with the final score being 27–17.

With the win the Steelers finished 11–5 and won their first division title since 2010. Also they swept the Bengals for the first time since 2011.

Roethlisberger tied Drew Brees for top passer in 2014 with 4,952 yards, Le'Veon Bell finished 2nd in rushing yards with 1,361, and Antonio Brown finished 1st in receiving yards with 1,698 and tied for 2nd in receiving touchdowns with 13. The Steelers offense finished 2nd in total yards per game (411.1), tied for 1st in yards per play (6.2) and 7th in points per game (27.2). The defense finished 18th in total yards allowed per game (353.4), 27th in passing yards allowed per game (253.1), 6th in rushing yards allowed per game (100.3) and 18th in points per game (23.0)

=== Postseason ===
==== AFC Wild Card Playoffs: vs. #6 Baltimore Ravens ====
AFC Wild Card Playoffs: (#6) Baltimore Ravens at (#3) Pittsburgh Steelers – Game summary

Quarter	1	2	3	4	Total
Ravens	0	10	10	10	30
Steelers	3	6	0	8	17

at Heinz Field, Pittsburgh, Pennsylvania

- Date: January 3, 2015
- Game time: 8:15 p.m. EST
- Game weather: 53 °F (12 °C), (Cloudy)
- Game attendance: 62,780
- Referee: Clete Blakeman
- TV announcers (NBC): Al Michaels, Cris Collinsworth and Michele Tafoya
- Recap, Gamebook

Game information

First quarter

- PIT – 1:29 Shaun Suisham 45-yard FG. Drive: 9 plays, 33 yards, 5:36 (PIT 3–0)

Second quarter

- BAL – 12:28 Bernard Pierce 5-yard TD run, Justin Tucker kick. Drive: 8 plays, 80 yards, 4:01 (BAL 7–3)
- PIT – 5:40 Shaun Suisham 22-yard FG. Drive: 12 plays, 82 yards, 6:48 (BAL 7–6)
- BAL – 2:41 Justin Tucker 45-yard FG. Drive: 10 plays, 70 yards, 2:59 (BAL 10–6)
- PIT – 0:37 Shaun Suisham 47-yard FG. Drive: 9 plays, 53 yards, 2:04 (BAL 10–9)

Third quarter

- BAL – 10:06 Justin Tucker 45-yard FG. Drive: 9 plays, 57 yards, 4:54 (BAL 13–9)
- BAL – 4:13 Torrey Smith 11-yard TD pass from Joe Flacco, Justin Tucker kick. Drive: 6 play, 69 yards, 3:25 (BAL 20–9)

Fourth quarter

- PIT – 11:01 Martavis Bryant 6-yard TD pass from Ben Roethlisberger, 2-point pass conversion failed. Drive: 2 plays, 45 yards, 0:50 (BAL 20–15)
- BAL – 8:47 Justin Tucker 52-yard FG. Drive: 7 plays, 29 yards, 2:14 (BAL 23–15)
- BAL – 7:56 Crockett Gillmore 21-yard TD pass from Joe Flacco, Justin Tucker kick. Drive: 1 play, 21 yards, 0:07 (BAL 30–15)
- PIT – 1:56 Punt blocked by Shamarko Thomas out of bounds in end zone for a Safety. Drive: 3 plays, 2 yards, 1:01 (BAL 30–17)

Top passers

- BAL – Joe Flacco 18/29, 259 yards, 2 TD
- PIT – Ben Roethlisberger 31/45, 334 yards, 1 TD, 2 INT

Top rushers

- BAL – Justin Forsett 16 carries, 36 yards
- PIT – Josh Harris 9 carries, 25 yards

Top receivers

- BAL – Steve Smith, Sr. 5 receptions, 101 yards
- PIT – Antonio Brown 9 receptions, 117 yards

Top tacklers

- BAL – Daryl Smith 9 tackles, 1 assist
- PIT – Troy Polamalu 5 tackles, 3 assists

Ben Roethlisberger was sacked five times and threw two interceptions in the loss, eliminating the Steelers from the playoffs. Baltimore's 13-point victory was the fourth-biggest win by a road team in Steelers postseason history. The Steelers fell to 9–1 when facing a team for a third time in the same season since the 1970 merger, 9–2 overall in such situations. The Ravens advanced to the divisional round for the sixth time since 2008. It would also mark safety Troy Polamalu's final game in a Steelers' uniform, as he announced his retirement on April 9, 2015.

== Standings ==
=== Division ===
AFC North
	W	L	T	PCT	DIV	CONF	PF	PA	STK
^{(3)} Pittsburgh Steelers	11	5	0	.688	4–2	9–3	436	368	W4
^{(5)} Cincinnati Bengals	10	5	1	.656	3–3	7–5	365	344	L1
^{(6)} Baltimore Ravens	10	6	0	.625	3–3	6–6	409	302	W1
Cleveland Browns	7	9	0	.438	2–4	4–8	299	337	L5

=== Conference ===
AFC
#	Team	Division	W	L	T	PCT	DIV	CONF	SOS	SOV	STK
Division leaders
1 (Note: New England defeated Denver head-to-head (Week 9, 43–21).)	New England Patriots	East	12	4	0	.750	4–2	9–3	.514	.487	L1
2	Denver Broncos	West	12	4	0	.750	6–0	10–2	.521	.484	W1
3 (Note: Pittsburgh defeated Indianapolis head-to-head (Week 8, 51–34).)	Pittsburgh Steelers	North	11	5	0	.688	4–2	9–3	.451	.486	W4
4	Indianapolis Colts	South	11	5	0	.688	6–0	9–3	.479	.372	W1
Wild Cards
5	Cincinnati Bengals	North	10	5	1	.656	3–3	7–5	.498	.425	L1
6	Baltimore Ravens	North	10	6	0	.625	3–3	6–6	.475	.378	W1
Did not qualify for the postseason
7 (Note: Kansas City finished ahead of San Diego in the AFC West based on head-to-head sweep (Week 7, 23–20; Week 17, 19–7). Houston finished ahead of Kansas City and Buffalo based on conference record. Kansas City finished ahead of Buffalo based on head-to-head victory (Week 10, 17–13). San Diego finished ahead of Buffalo based on head-to-head victory (Week 3, 22–10).)	Houston Texans	South	9	7	0	.563	4–2	8–4	.447	.299	W2
8	Kansas City Chiefs	West	9	7	0	.563	3–3	7–5	.512	.500	W1
9	San Diego Chargers	West	9	7	0	.563	2–4	6–6	.512	.403	L1
10	Buffalo Bills	East	9	7	0	.563	4–2	5–7	.516	.486	W1
11	Miami Dolphins	East	8	8	0	.500	3–3	6–6	.512	.406	L1
12	Cleveland Browns	North	7	9	0	.438	2–4	4–8	.479	.371	L5
13	New York Jets	East	4	12	0	.250	1–5	4–8	.543	.375	W1
14 (Note: Jacksonville finished ahead of Oakland based on record vs. common opponents (1–4 to 0–5).)	Jacksonville Jaguars	South	3	13	0	.188	1–5	2–10	.514	.313	L1
15	Oakland Raiders	West	3	13	0	.188	1–5	2–10	.570	.542	L1
16	Tennessee Titans	South	2	14	0	.125	1–5	2–10	.506	.375	L10
Tiebreakers (Note: When breaking ties for three or more teams under the NFL's rules, they are first broken within divisions, then comparing only the highest ranked remaining team from each division.)

== Statistics ==
Updated December 30, 2014

=== Team ===
	Pittsburgh	Opponent
Total First Downs	379	314
Rushing First Downs	98	88
Passing First Downs	243	193
By Penalty First Downs	38	33
Third Down Conversions	93/208	71/189
Fourth Down Conversions	5/10	10/14
Total Offensive Yards	6,577	5,654
Offensive Plays	1,061	940
Average Yards per Play	6.2	6.0
Total Rushing Yards	1,752	1,605
Rushing Plays	423	368
Rushing Yards per Play	4.1	4.4
Total Passing Yards	4,997	4,243
Passing Completions/Attempts	411/612	350/543
Interceptions	10	11
Passing Yards per Play	8.2	7.8
Sacks	33.0	33.0
Field Goals	29/32	30/32
Touchdowns	49	40
Rushing Touchdowns	10	9
Passing Touchdowns	33	30
Return Touchdowns	1	1
Defensive Touchdowns	5	0
Time of Possession	32:24	27:36
Turnover Ratio	0	

=== Passing ===
Regular season
Player	ATT	COMP	YDS	COMP %	YDS/ATT	TD	TD %	INT	INT %	LONG	SCK	LOST	RATING
Ben Roethlisberger	608	408	4,952	67.1	8.1	32	5.3	9	1.5	94	33	172	103.3
Robert Golden	1	1	25	100.0	25.0	0	0.0	0	0.0	25	0	0	118.8
Antonio Brown	2	2	20	100.0	10.0	1	50.0	0	0.0	17	0	0	147.9
Brad Wing	1	0	0	0.0	0.0	0	0.0	1	100.0	0	0	0	0.0

=== Rushing ===
Regular season
Player	ATT	YDS	YDS/ATT	LONG	TD
Le'Veon Bell	290	1,361	4.7	81	8
LeGarrette Blount	65	266	4.1	50	2
Dri Archer	10	40	4.0	15	0
Ben Roethlisberger	33	27	0.8	8	0
Markus Wheaton	4	19	4.8	12	0
Josh Harris	9	16	1.8	4	0
Antonio Brown	4	13	3.3	9	0
Martavis Bryant	3	12	4.0	9	0
Will Johnson	2	0	0.0	0	0
Brad Wing	1	0	0.0	0	0
Bruce Gradkowski	2	−2	−1.0	−1	0
Total	423	1,752	4.1	–	10

=== Receiving ===
Regular season
Player	ATT	YDS	YDS/REC	LONG	TD
Antonio Brown	129	1,698	13.2	63	13
Le'Veon Bell	83	854	10.3	48	3
Heath Miller	66	761	11.5	49	3
Markus Wheaton	53	644	12.2	47	2
Martavis Bryant	26	549	21.1	94	8
Lance Moore	14	198	14.1	29	2
Justin Brown	12	94	7.8	18	0
Dri Archer	7	23	3.3	15	0
LeGarrette Blount	6	36	6.0	13	0
Will Johnson	6	41	6.8	18	0
Darrius Heyward-Bey	3	33	11.0	17	0
Matt Spaeth	3	46	15.3	33	1
Maurkice Pouncey	1	0	0.0	0	0
Michael Palmer	1	1	1.0	1	1
Antwon Blake	1	25	25.0	25	0
Total	411	4,997	8.2	–	33

=== Field Goals ===
Regular season
Player	1–19	20–29	30–39	40–49	50+
Shaun Suisham	0/0	13/12	6/6	10/10	3/1
Total	0/0	13/12	6/6	10/10	3/1
Opponent Total	0/0	12/12	11/11	7/6	2/1

=== Punting ===
Regular season
Player	Punts	AVG	TB	In 20	LONG	BLK
Brad Wing	61	43.7	4	20	74	0
Total	61	43.7	4	20	74	0
Opponent Total	68	45.3	3	20	69	0

=== Punt Returns ===
Regular season
Player	RT	FC	YDS/RET	LONG	TD
Antonio Brown	30	16	10.6	71	1
Dri Archer	1	0	2.0	2	0
Vince Williams	1	0	0.0	0	0
Total	32	16	10.0	71	1
Opponent Total	27	18	8.1	33	0

=== Kick Returns ===
Regular season
Player	RT	YDS	YDS/RET	LONG	TD
Markus Wheaton	20	494	24.7	41	0
Dri Archer	9	161	17.9	23	0
LeGarrette Blount	5	103	20.6	29	0
Antonio Brown	1	0	0.0	0	0
Total	35	758	21.7	41	0
Opponent Total	54	1,249	23.1	108	1

=== Defense ===
Regular season
Player	T	S	A	SCK	F
Lawrence Timmons	132	87	45	2.0	0
Mike Mitchell	71	53	18	0.0	2
William Gay	69	58	11	0.0	0
Troy Polamalu	61	40	21	0.0	1
Jason Worilds	59	39	20	7.5	1
Sean Spence	53	34	19	1.0	0
Cameron Heyward	53	33	20	7.5	0
James Harrison	45	29	16	5.5	0
Vince Williams	44	28	16	0.0	0
Antwon Blake	42	37	5	0.0	1
Cortez Allen	41	36	5	0.0	0
Ryan Shazier	36	24	12	0.0	0
Will Allen	36	22	14	0.0	1
Brice McCain	25	16	9	0.0	0
Arthur Moats	23	17	6	4.0	2
Steve McLendon	21	12	9	1.0	0
Cam Thomas	18	11	7	0.5	0
Jarvis Jones	18	9	9	2.0	1
Stephon Tuitt	17	11	6	1.0	1
Brett Keisel	17	8	9	1.0	0
Ike Taylor	16	11	5	0.0	0
Terence Garvin	16	10	6	0.0	0
Robert Golden	10	5	5	0.0	0
Darrius Heyward-Bey	7	5	2	0.0	1
Ross Ventrone	7	5	2	0.0	0
Shamarko Thomas	5	5	0	0.0	1
Heath Miller	4	4	0	0.0	0
Will Johnson	4	3	1	0.0	0
Le'Veon Bell	3	3	0	0.0	0
Greg Warren	3	1	2	0.0	0
Al Woods	16	8	8	2	0
B. W. Webb	2	2	0	0.0	0
Michael Palmer	2	2	0	0.0	0
Markus Wheaton	2	2	0	0.0	0
Antonio Brown	2	2	0	0.0	0
Dan McCullers	2	1	1	0.0	0
Kelvin Beachum	1	1	0	0.0	0
Matt Spaeth	1	1	0	0.0	0
Maurkice Pouncey	1	1	0	0.0	0
Ramon Foster	1	1	0	0.0	0
Marcus Gilbert	1	1	0	0.0	0
David DeCastro	1	1	0	0.0	0
Brad Wing	1	1	0	0.0	0
Mike Adams	1	1	0	0	0
Shaun Suisham	1	0	1	0.0	0
Total	1,006	704	302	33.0	12
Opponent Total	1,136	748	388	33.0	9

=== Interceptions ===
Regular season
Player	INT	YDS	YDS/INT	LONG	TD
William Gay	3	113	37.7	52	3
Brice McCain	3	56	18.7	31	1
Cortez Allen	2	27	13.5	27	0
Jason Worilds	1	30	30.0	30	0
Antwon Blake	1	0	0.0	0	0
Brett Keisel	1	16	16.0	16	0
Total	11	242	22.0	52	4
Opponent Total	10	29	2.9	13	0

== Transactions ==
The Steelers have been involved in the following transactions during the 2014 season:

=== Free agents ===
Player	Acquired from	Lost to	Date	Contract terms
Mike Mitchell	Carolina Panthers		March 11, 2014	5-year/$25 million
Al Woods		Tennessee Titans	March 12, 2014	2-year/$4 million
David Johnson		San Diego Chargers	March 12, 2014	2-year/$1.7 million
Ziggy Hood		Jacksonville Jaguars	March 13, 2014	4-year/$16 million
Cam Thomas	San Diego Chargers		March 14, 2014	2-year/$4 million
Emmanuel Sanders		Denver Broncos	March 15, 2014	3-year/$15 million
Jerricho Cotchery		Carolina Panthers	March 20, 2014	2-year/$8.015 million
Jonathan Dwyer		Arizona Cardinals	March 20, 2014	1 year/$790,000
Lance Moore	New Orleans Saints		March 21, 2014	2-year/$3 million
Arthur Moats	Buffalo Bills		March 24, 2014	1 year/$795,000
LeGarrette Blount	New England Patriots		March 28, 2014	2-year/$3.85 million
Brice McCain	Houston Texans		April 1, 2014	1 year/$795,000
Darrius Heyward-Bey	Indianapolis Colts		April 2, 2014	1 year/$795,000
Adam Podlesh	Chicago Bears		April 15, 2014	1 year/$855,000

=== Waivers ===
Player	Claimed from	Lost to	Date
Deion Belue	Miami Dolphins		May 28, 2014
Jasper Collins		Cincinnati Bengals	June 5, 2014
B. W. Webb	Dallas Cowboys		August 29, 2014

=== Signings ===
Player	Date	Contract terms
Brad Wing	January 3, 2014	1 year/$420,000
Bryce Davis	January 3, 2014	1 year/$420,000
Miguel Maysonet	January 7, 2014	1 year/$420,000
Daniel Molls	January 7, 2014	1 year/$420,000
Lanear Sampson	January 7, 2014	1 year/$420,000
Devin Smith	January 7, 2014	1 year/$420,000
Al Lapuaho	January 9, 2014	1 year/$420,000
Jasper Collins	January 10, 2014	1 year/$420,000
Jordan Dangerfield	January 10, 2014	1 year/$420,000
Tauren Poole	January 27, 2014	1 year/$420,000
Vic So'oto	January 27, 2014	1 year/$570,000
Danny Coale	January 28, 2014	1 year/$420,000
Jason Worilds	March 4, 2014	1 year/$9.75 million
Heath Miller	March 5, 2014	2-year extension/$8 million
Troy Polamalu	March 5, 2014	2-year extension/$11.75 million
Will Allen	March 5, 2014	1 year/$1.02 million
Greg Warren	March 11, 2014	1 year/$920,000
Cody Wallace	March 12, 2014	3-year/$3.48 million
Guy Whimper	March 17, 2014	1 year/$920,000
Michael Palmer	March 21, 2014	1 year/$730,000
Chris Elkins	May 10, 2014	1 year/$420,000
Ethan Hemer	May 10, 2014	1 year/$420,000
Kaycee Ike	May 10, 2014	1 year/$420,000
Howard Jones	May 10, 2014	1 year/$420,000
Brendon Kay	May 10, 2014	1 year/$420,000
Josh Mauro	May 10, 2014	1 year/$420,000
Roy Philon	May 10, 2014	1 year/$420,000
Will Simmons	May 10, 2014	1 year/$420,000
Eric Waters	May 10, 2014	1 year/$420,000
Daniel McCullers	May 19, 2014	4-year/$2.29 million
Rob Blanchflower	May 19, 2014	4-year/$2.27 million
Wesley Johnson	May 27, 2014	4-year/$2.36 million
Jordan Zumwalt	May 27, 2014	4-year/$2.32 million
Shaquille Richardson	May 29, 2014	4-year/$2.41 million
Deion Belue	May 29, 2014	1 year/$420,000
Emmanuel McCray	May 29, 2014	1 year/$420,000
C.J. Goodwin	June 4, 2014	1 year/$420,000
Ryan Shazier	June 5, 2014	4-year/$9.5 million
Martavis Bryant	June 9, 2014	4-year/$2.66 million
Maurkice Pouncey	June 12, 2014	5-year extension/$44 million
Dri Archer	June 13, 2014	4-year/$2.72 million
Stephon Tuitt	June 18, 2014	4-year/$4.61 million
Jordan Hall	June 18, 2014	1 year/$420,000
Lewis Toler	July 25, 2014	1 year/$420,000
Josh Harris	July 29, 2014	1 year/$420,000
Shaun Suisham	August 1, 2014	4-year extension/$9.60 million
Jawan Jamison	August 1, 2014	1 year/$420,000
James Shaw	August 6, 2014	1 year/$420,000
Stephen Houston	August 13, 2014	1 year/$420,000
Luke Ingram	August 14, 2014	1 year/$420,000
Graham Pocic	August 18, 2014	1 year/$420,000
Dayonne Nunley	August 18, 2014	1 year/$420,000
Marcus Gilbert	August 19, 2014	6-year extension/$30.81 million
Brett Keisel	August 20, 2014	2-year/$3 million
Cortez Allen	September 6, 2014	5-year extension/$24.6 million
James Harrison	September 23, 2014	1 year/$910,000
LaDarius Perkins	November 19, 2014	1 year/$420,000
Joe Kruger	November 24, 2014	1 year/$420,000
Clifton Geathers	December 1, 2014	1 year/$420,000
Ben Tate	December 30, 2014	1 year/$645,000

=== Other ===
Name	Date	Details
Jack Bicknell, Jr.	January 3, 2014	Terminated as offensive line coach
Mike Munchak	January 23, 2014	Hired as offensive line coach
James Saxon	January 28, 2014	Hired as running backs coach
Joey Porter	February 11, 2014	Hired as defensive assistant coach
Levi Brown	March 5, 2014	Released
Curtis Brown	March 5, 2014	Released
Larry Foote	March 5, 2014	Released
LaMarr Woodley	March 11, 2014	Released
Nik Embernate	May 29, 2014	Waived
Kaycee Ike	May 29, 2014	Waived
Jasper Collins	June 4, 2014	Waived
Deion Belue	June 18, 2014	Released
Kion Wilson	July 25, 2014	Released
Jawan Jamison	August 11, 2014	Waived
James Shaw	August 18, 2014	Released
Al Lapuaho	August 20, 2014	Released
Jordan Hall	August 26, 2014	Released
Miguel Maysonet	August 26, 2014	Released
C.J. Goodwin	August 26, 2014	Released
Kashif Moore	August 26, 2014	Released
Eric Waters	August 26, 2014	Released
Jordan Dangerfield	August 26, 2014	Released
Devin Smith	August 26, 2014	Released
Lewis Toler	August 26, 2014	Released
Vic So'oto	August 26, 2014	Released
Brian Arnfelt	August 26, 2014	Released
Hebron Fangupo	August 26, 2014	Released
Chris Elkins	August 26, 2014	Released
Emmanuel McCray	August 26, 2014	Released
Luke Ingram	August 26, 2014	Released
Tauren Poole	August 26, 2014	Released
Rob Blanchflower	August 30, 2014	Released
Bryce Davis	August 30, 2014	Released
David Paulson	August 30, 2014	Released
Isaiah Green	August 30, 2014	Released
Dayonne Nunley	August 30, 2014	Released
Shaquille Richardson	August 30, 2014	Released
Ross Ventrone	August 30, 2014	Released
Josh Harris	August 30, 2014	Released
Stephen Houston	August 30, 2014	Released
Ethan Hemer	August 30, 2014	Released
Josh Mauro	August 30, 2014	Released
Roy Philon	August 30, 2014	Released
David Paulson	August 30, 2014	Released
Nick Williams	August 30, 2014	Released
Chris Carter	August 30, 2014	Released
Howard Jones	August 30, 2014	Released
Dan Molls	August 30, 2014	Released
Brendon Kay	August 30, 2014	Released
Derek Moye	August 30, 2014	Released
Lanear Sampson	August 30, 2014	Released
Graham Pocic	August 30, 2014	Released
Will Simmons	August 30, 2014	Released
Guy Whimper	August 30, 2014	Released
Adam Podlesh	September 30, 2014	Released
Wesley Johnson	October 11, 2014	Released
LeGarrette Blount	November 18, 2014	Released
Justin Brown	December 30, 2014	Released
