= B. W. Webb =

American football player (born 1990)

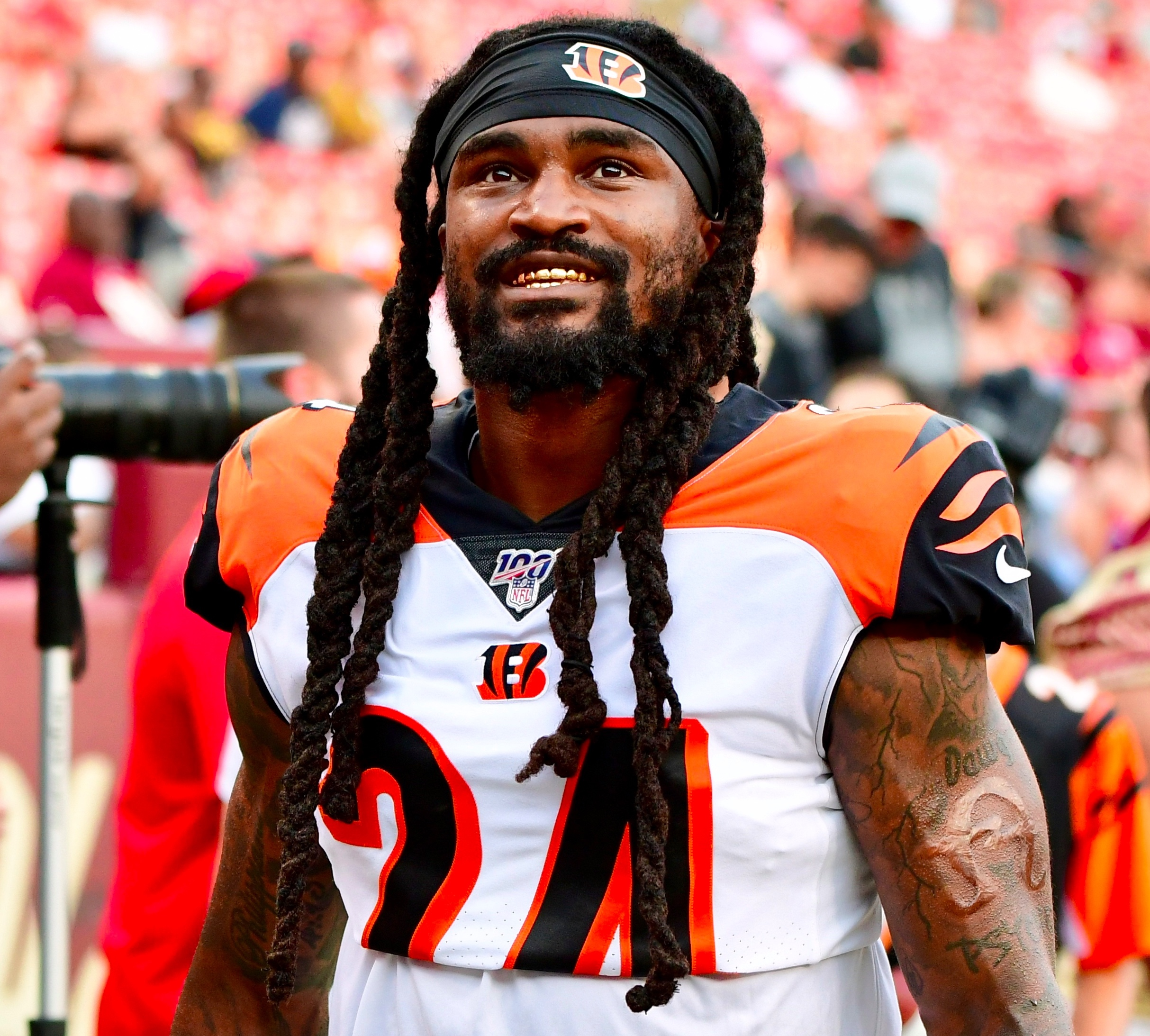
- Webb with the Cincinnati Bengals in 2019

No. 20, 39, 38, 28, 23
- Position: Cornerback

Personal information
- Born: May 3, 1990 (age 36); Newport News, Virginia, U.S.
- Listed height: 5 ft 11 in (1.80 m)
- Listed weight: 190 lb (86 kg)

Career information
- High school: Warwick (Newport News)
- College: William & Mary
- NFL draft: 2013: 4th round, 114th overall pick

Career history
- Dallas Cowboys (2013); Pittsburgh Steelers (2014); Tennessee Titans (2015); New Orleans Saints (2016); Chicago Bears (2017)*; Cleveland Browns (2017); New York Giants (2018); Cincinnati Bengals (2019); Arizona Cardinals (2020)*; San Francisco 49ers (2021)*
- * Offseason or practice squad member only

Awards and highlights
- 3× First-team All-CAA (2010–2012); Second-team All-CAA (2009); CAA Defensive Rookie of the Year (2009)

Career NFL statistics
- Total tackles: 164
- Sacks: 1.0
- Forced fumbles: 1
- Pass deflections: 27
- Interceptions: 4
- Stats at Pro Football Reference

William Wilson "B. W." Webb Jr. (born May 3, 1990) is an American former professional football player who was a cornerback in the National Football League (NFL). He played college football for the William & Mary Tribe, and was selected by the Dallas Cowboys in the fourth round of the 2013 NFL draft. He was also a member of the Cincinnati Bengals, New York Giants, Cleveland Browns, Chicago Bears, New Orleans Saints, Tennessee Titans, Pittsburgh Steelers, Arizona Cardinals, and San Francisco 49ers.

== Early life ==
Webb was born in Newport News, Virginia. He attended Warwick High School and Hampton Roads Academy under the tutelage of Coach Abe Mikell in Newport News, and played high school football for the Warwick Raiders. While working with Coach Abe Mikell, Webb developed his fundamentals and love of the game. He was a two-year starter at cornerback and wide receiver. Webb had seven career interceptions, two of which were returned for scores. He was named to first-team All-Peninsula District as a cornerback (2007), and earned honorable mention distinction as a junior.

He was also a standout track athlete at Warwick, he ran a career best time of 6.60 seconds in the 55 metres. He excelled in triple jump and long jump as well. He was named to the All-America Team in track and field.

== College career ==
Webb decided to enroll in the College of William & Mary, where he played for the William & Mary Tribe football team from 2008 to 2012. After redshirting in 2008, he was honored as the Colonial Athletic Association (CAA) Defensive Rookie of the Year. He was also selected to the All-CAA second-team as a cornerback and to the all-league third-team as a punt returner. He was tied for second nationally with eight interceptions, including a pair of interceptions returned for touchdowns, and totaled 160 interception return yards.

In 2010, he was selected to the All-CAA first-team as a cornerback and garnered second-team honors as a punt returner after finished the season with 42 tackles, 0.5 tackles for loss, an interception and six passes broken up. In 2011, he earned first-team all-conference honors at cornerback for the second consecutive season, and finished the season with 40 tackles, 3.0 tackles for a loss and two interceptions.

As a senior, he garnered first-team all-league distinction as a cornerback for the third consecutive season, he also earned second-team all-conference honors as a punt returner. He finished his career with nine postseason all-conference honors, and set a school record with 48 career starts. He started all 11 games and totaled 46 tackles, two fumble recoveries, a forced fumble, eight passes broken up and a tackle for loss. He was initiated as a member of Omega Psi Phi fraternity at William and Mary.

== Professional career ==
External videos
- B.W. Webb’s NFL Combine Workout

Pre-draft measurables
Height	Weight	Arm length	Hand span	40-yard dash	10-yard split	20-yard split	20-yard shuttle	Three-cone drill	Vertical jump	Broad jump	Bench press
5 ft 10 1/4 in (1.78 m)	184 lb (83 kg)	30 1/4 in (0.77 m)	9 3/8 in (0.24 m)	4.51 s	1.59 s	2.63 s	3.84 s	6.82 s	40.5 in (1.03 m)	11 ft 0 in (3.35 m)	14 reps
All values from NFL Combine

=== Dallas Cowboys ===
The Dallas Cowboys selected Webb in the fourth round (114th overall) of the 2013 NFL draft. Webb was the 16th cornerback drafted in 2013.

External videos
- Cowboys draft B.W. Webb 114th overall

On May 14, 2013, the Dallas Cowboys signed Webb to a four-year, $2.60 million contract that includes a signing bonus of $443,380.

Webb entered training camp slated as the fourth cornerback on the depth chart. Head coach Jason Garrett named Webb the fourth cornerback on the depth chart to begin the regular season, behind Brandon Carr, Morris Claiborne, and Orlando Scandrick.

He made his professional regular season debut in the Dallas Cowboys’ season-opening 36–31 victory against the New York Giants. In Week 8, he collected a season-high three solo tackles and deflected a pass during a 27–23 win against the Minnesota Vikings. Webb saw an increased snap count in Weeks 9–10 after Morris Claiborne was sidelined due to a hamstring injury. On December 9, 2013, Webb had a dismal performance and was benched in favor of Sterling Moore during a 45–28 loss at the Chicago Bears in a Week 13. He was surpassed by Sterling Moore on the depth chart and was demoted to the scout team for the remainder of the season. Webb was inactive as a healthy scratch for the Dallas Cowboys’ 24–22 loss to the Philadelphia Eagles in a Week 17. Webb finished his rookie season in 2013 with 16 combined tackles (13 solo) and one pass deflection in 15 games and zero starts.

Throughout training camp, Webb competed against Sterling Moore, Tyler Patmon, Terrance Mitchell, and Dashaun Phillips to be the fourth cornerback on the depth chart. On August 28, 2014, the Dallas Cowboys waived Webb after he was inactive for their fourth preseason game due to a hip flexor.

=== Pittsburgh Steelers ===
On August 29, 2014, the Pittsburgh Steelers claimed Webb off of waivers. Head coach Mike Tomlin named Webb the fifth cornerback on the Steelers’ Depth Chart to begin the season, behind Ike Taylor, Cortez Allen, William Gay, and Brice McCain.

He was activated for 11 games and played mainly on special teams. He was released by the team on September 5, 2015.

=== Tennessee Titans ===
On September 9, 2015, he was signed to the Tennessee Titans practice squad. He was promoted to the active roster on November 8, for a game against the New Orleans Saints in which he recorded his first career interception. He appeared in 9 games (2 starts), while registering 22 tackles, one interception and three passes defensed. On September 2, 2016, he was released as part of final roster cuts.

=== New Orleans Saints ===
On September 14, 2016, Webb was signed by the New Orleans Saints, to provide depth at the cornerback position after Delvin Breaux suffered a broken fibula. He played in 14 games with eight starts with the Saints, recording career-highs of 28 tackles and 11 passes defensed to go along with one interception.

=== Chicago Bears ===
On April 5, 2017, Webb signed a one-year contract with the Chicago Bears. He was released by the Bears on September 2.

=== Cleveland Browns ===
On December 19, 2017, Webb signed with the Cleveland Browns. He was waived by Cleveland on December 29.

Webb signed a reserve/future contract with the Browns on January 1, 2018. He was released by the Browns on March 15.

=== New York Giants ===
On March 19, 2018, Webb signed a one-year contract with the New York Giants.

=== Cincinnati Bengals ===
On March 14, 2019, Webb signed a three-year contract worth $10.5 million with the Cincinnati Bengals. He played in 15 games with 12 starts, recording 37 tackles, seven passes defensed, and one interception.

On March 18, 2020, Webb was released by the Bengals.

=== Arizona Cardinals ===
On August 21, 2020, Webb signed a one-year contract with the Arizona Cardinals. He was released by the Cardinals on August 27.

=== San Francisco 49ers ===
On August 4, 2021, Webb signed a one-year contract with the San Francisco 49ers. He was released by San Francisco on August 24.

== NFL career statistics ==
Legend
**Bold**	Career high

Year	Team	Games		Tackles					Interceptions					Fumbles			
Year	Team	GP	GS	Cmb	Solo	Ast	Sck	TFL	Int	Yds	TD	Lng	PD	FF	FR	Yds	TD
2013	DAL	15	0	16	13	3	0.0	0	0	0	0	0	1	0	0	0	0
2014	PIT	11	0	2	2	0	0.0	0	0	0	0	0	0	0	0	0	0
2015	TEN	9	2	22	20	2	0.0	1	**1**	0	0	0	2	0	0	0	0
2016	NOR	14	8	28	25	3	0.0	0	**1**	**7**	0	**7**	**11**	0	0	0	0
2018	NYG	**16**	**13**	**59**	**52**	**7**	**1.0**	**2**	**1**	0	0	0	6	**1**	0	0	0
2019	CIN	15	12	37	30	**7**	0.0	1	**1**	1	0	1	7	0	0	0	0
Career		80	35	164	142	22	1.0	4	4	8	0	7	27	1	0	0	0
