= Josh Harris (running back) =

American football player (born 1991)

No. 26, 40
- Position: Running back

Personal information
- Born: January 22, 1991 (age 35); Duncanville, Texas, U.S.
- Listed height: 5 ft 11 in (1.80 m)
- Listed weight: 210 lb (95 kg)

Career information
- College: Wake Forest
- NFL draft: 2014: undrafted

Career history
- Pittsburgh Steelers (2014); BC Lions (2016); Saskatchewan Roughriders (2017)

Career NFL statistics
- Rushing attempts: 9
- Rushing yards: 16
- Stats at Pro Football Reference
- Stats at CFL.ca

Joshua Derrell Harris (born January 22, 1991) is an American former professional football player who was a running back for the Pittsburgh Steelers of the National Football League (NFL). He played college football for the Wake Forest Demon Deacons and signed as an undrafted free agent with the Steelers in 2014.

== Early life ==
A 2009 graduate of Duncanville High School, Harris was a two-sport star in football and track. In 2007, Harris played on defense, recording 80 tackles. As a junior, he rushed for 900 yards and 6 touchdowns on 60 carries. During his junior year, he suffered a torn ACL in April 2008 and had surgery the following month. After extensive rehabilitation, he wouldn't return to play his senior season until October 24. He would accumulate 126 yards on 9 carries and one touchdown his first game back after injury.

In track and field, Harris helped his high school return to the state playoffs for their first time since 2004. He ran a 10.93 at the District 8-5A track championship in 2007 as a sophomore. At the 2009 Dallas Samuel Invitational, he placed first in both the 100m and 200-meter dash with times of 10.22 seconds and 21.00 seconds, respectively.

== College career ==
Harris played college football at Wake Forest University from 2009 to 2013. He would redshirt during his freshman season. In 2010 he led his team in rushing with 720 yards and 5 touchdowns despite starting only four games. In his sophomore year he would battle injuries and only start 5 games. He would be second rushing leader on the Deacons that year rushing 101 times for 432 yards and 3 touchdowns. Harris would also have 5 receptions for 22 yards. The Deacons would go on to the Music City Bowl against Mississippi State that season, with Harris returning 2 kicks during the game.

After an injury plagued sophomore year he would rebound and start a career-high 11 games that season. He would lead the team with 608 rushing yards on 137 carries, but would rank second in rushing touchdowns with 5 for the season. He would also rank fifth in receptions with 19 for 96 yards and no scores. During this season he would also do track and field, competing in the 2013 ACC Indoor Championships placing 11th in the 60 meter dash. For his senior year he would have 125 rushing attempts for 470 yards and 4 touchdowns in 12 games. Harris also had 15 receptions for 117 yards. During his career he rushed for 2,195 yards on 482 carries with 19 touchdowns in 42 games.

== Professional career ==
Pre-draft measurables
Height	Weight	Arm length	Hand span	Wingspan	40-yard dash	10-yard split	20-yard split	20-yard shuttle	Three-cone drill	Vertical jump	Broad jump	Bench press
5 ft 9 7/8 in (1.77 m)	206 lb (93 kg)	30 1/2 in (0.77 m)	9 in (0.23 m)	6 ft 1 3/4 in (1.87 m)	4.46 s	1.57 s	2.54 s	4.21 s	7.00 s	35.5 in (0.90 m)	9 ft 11 in (3.02 m)	28 reps
All values from Pro Day

=== 2014 NFL draft ===
Although he was not invited to the NFL Combine, Harris showed great potential during Wake Forest's Pro Day. He expected to be selected during rounds 4–6. After going undrafted and not being signed immediately after the draft he speculated that the Wake Forest staff and his former coaches had bad-mouthed him to NFL scouts saying he was a problem in the locker room and didn't give all his effort. After making public accusations on social media his former position coach at Wake Forest denied the allegations and expressed regret for the possibility that other staff members may have made negative comments that may have affected his draft value. He was among 11 undrafted rookies to attend a tryout at the Dallas Cowboys rookie mini-camp but was unsigned.

=== Pittsburgh Steelers ===
Harris signed with the Pittsburgh Steelers as an undrafted free agent in 2014 with a contract worth $930k for 2 years. He was signed to the Steelers active roster on November 18, 2014.

After Week 11 the Pittsburgh Steelers released back up running back LeGarrette Blount. In need of depth at the position they subsequently signed Harris. His first game on the active roster was Week 13 against the New Orleans Saints. He finished the 2014 season with 9 carries for 16 yards and no touchdowns. After the 2014 season, which he wore 40, Harris would return to the number he wore at Wake Forest, 25.

On September 5, 2015, Harris was released by the Steelers.

=== BC Lions ===
On October 4, 2016, Harris signed to the BC Lions practice squad. On February 27, 2017, Harris re-signed with the BC Lions.

== Personal life ==
Joshua Derrell Harris was born in Dallas, Texas to Derrell Harris III and his mother Beverly Harris. He graduated from Wake Forest with a degree in sociology in 2013.
