= Michael Palmer (American football) =

American football player (born 1988)

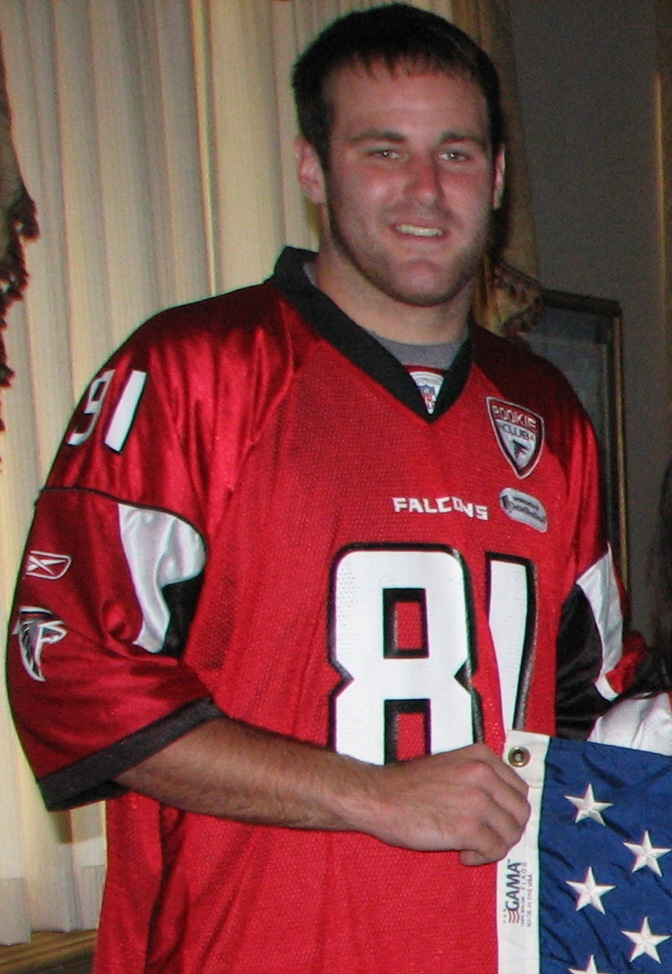
- Palmer with the Atlanta Falcons

No. 81, 82
- Position: Tight end

Personal information
- Born: January 18, 1988 (age 38); Tucker, Georgia, U.S.
- Listed height: 6 ft 5 in (1.96 m)
- Listed weight: 252 lb (114 kg)

Career information
- High school: Parkview (Lilburn, Georgia)
- College: Clemson
- NFL draft: 2010: undrafted

Career history
- Atlanta Falcons (2010−2012); New York Giants (2013)*; Seattle Seahawks (2013)*; Pittsburgh Steelers (2013−2014)
- * Offseason or practice squad member only

Awards and highlights
- First-team All-ACC (2009)

Career NFL statistics
- Receptions: 23
- Receiving yards: 132
- Receiving touchdowns: 4
- Stats at Pro Football Reference

Michael Palmer (born January 18, 1988) is an American former professional football player who was a tight end in the National Football League (NFL). He played college football for the Clemson Tigers.

== College career ==
He started for 3 years at Clemson University in which he caught 73 passes for 825 yards and 8 TDs. His senior year he caught 43 passes for 507 yards and 4 Tds while breaking multiple records for Clemson tight ends.

== Professional career ==
=== Atlanta Falcons ===
After going undrafted in the 2010 NFL draft, Palmer signed a rookie free agent contract with the Atlanta Falcons on April 24, 2010. In three years with Atlanta, Palmer played in 43 games, starting five. He caught 21 passes for 123 yards, with 3 touchdowns.

=== New York Giants ===
Palmer signed with the New York Giants on May 11, 2013. He was released on May 29, 2013 due to an injury.

=== Seattle Seahawks ===
Palmer was signed by the Seattle Seahawks on July 23, 2013. On August 6, 2013, he was released by the Seahawks due to an injury.

=== Pittsburgh Steelers ===
On August 8, 2013, Palmer was awarded to the Pittsburgh Steelers on waivers, after injuries to three of Pittsburgh's top four tight ends.

Palmer played 2 seasons in Pittsburgh backing up Heath Miller. Palmer caught 2 passes and a TD with the Steelers before deciding to retire from football.
