= Cortez Allen =

American football player (born 1988)

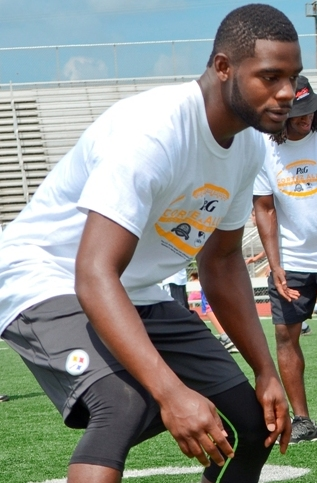
- Allen at his football camp in 2014

No. 28
- Position: Cornerback

Personal information
- Born: October 29, 1988 (age 38); San Diego, California, U.S.
- Listed height: 6 ft 1 in (1.85 m)
- Listed weight: 197 lb (89 kg)

Career information
- High school: North Marion (Citra, Florida)
- College: The Citadel (2006–2010)
- NFL draft: 2011: 4th round, 128th overall pick

Career history
- Pittsburgh Steelers (2011–2015)

Awards and highlights
- 2× second-team All-Southern (2009, 2010)

Career NFL statistics
- Total tackles: 168
- Interceptions: 6
- Forced fumbles: 3
- Pass deflections: 34
- Defensive touchdowns: 1
- Stats at Pro Football Reference

Cortez Lequon Allen (born October 29, 1988) is an American former professional football player who was a cornerback for the Pittsburgh Steelers of the National Football League (NFL). He played college football for The Citadel Bulldogs. Allen was selected by the Steelers in the fourth round of the 2011 NFL draft.

== Early life ==
Allen was born in San Diego, California, and grew up in Citra, Florida. He graduated from North Marion High School of Citra in 2006 prior to being recruited to The Citadel. While in high school, Allen played varsity football only in his senior year and also ran on the track and field team. Allen earned all-state and all-city football honors in his one year of varsity football and was part of the 2005 regional championship team.

== College career ==
Allen posted 120 tackles and 5 interceptions in his career with the Bulldogs football team of The Citadel, The Military College of South Carolina, returning two for touchdowns. As a freshman in 2006, Allen played in four games and had one assisted and one solo tackle. He redshirted the 2007 season. In 2008, as a sophomore, Allen played all 12 games and started 6. Against Furman (October 18), Allen made a season-high seven tackles, and against Samford (October 25), Allen made six tackles (including one for loss) and broke up one pass.

In his junior season (2009), Allen played and started in all 11 games. Of his 57 total tackles in 2009, 36 were solo. Following Citadel's victory over Samford on October 31, the Southern Conference named Allen the Defensive Player of the Week for six solo tackles and two interceptions returned for 110 yards. For 2009, Allen earned second-team All-Southern Conference honors. Allen would again earn second-team honors in his senior season (2010), having made 23 tackles (13 solo), 6 passes defended (most in the team), and 2 interceptions (returned for 18 yards). Allen also made 8 red zone stops, including two at the one-yard line.

== Professional career ==
=== Pre-draft ===
Before the draft, analyst Mel Kiper Jr. considered Allen a "sleeper" who would be selected in the third or fourth round. Kiper also described Allen as "a big corner who runs well, tests well athletically and has good strength". Allen was invited to the NFL combine and performed all the position drills and workouts. At the Citadel's Pro Day on March 28, 2011, he stood on his combine numbers but performed the vertical again, posting 37 1/2 inches this time. Scouts were very high on his physical tools and size but said he had to develop his awareness and was a raw prospect lacking the natural coverage instincts that are needed to be an NFL starter.

Pre-draft measurables
Height	Weight	Arm length	Hand span	Wingspan	40-yard dash	10-yard split	20-yard split	20-yard shuttle	Three-cone drill	Vertical jump	Broad jump	Bench press
6 ft 1 1/4 in (1.86 m)	197 lb (89 kg)	32 1/4 in (0.82 m)	8 5/8 in (0.22 m)	6 ft 5 1/2 in (1.97 m)	4.51 s	1.57 s	2.60 s	4.01 s	6.76 s	37.5 in (0.95 m)	10 ft 9 in (3.28 m)	18 reps
All values from NFL Combine/Pro Day

=== 2011 ===
The Pittsburgh Steelers selected Allen in the fourth round (128th overall) of the 2011 NFL draft.

On July 28, 2011, the Steelers signed Allen to a four-year, $2.43 million contract that includes a signing bonus of $293,625. Due to injury, Allen missed much of training camp.

Allen played 15 games in the 2011 season and missed Week 6 (October 9) due to an ankle injury. He debuted professionally in Week 1 (September 11) against the Baltimore Ravens on special teams. In Week 2 (September 18), Allen and Arnaz Battle made a special teams tackle of the Seattle Seahawks' Leon Washington during a third quarter kickoff return. On October 23 (Week 7) against the Arizona Cardinals, Allen made his first defensive tackle. Allen made four defensive tackles on October 30 (Week 8) against the New England Patriots and was part of a defense that limited Tom Brady to 198 passing yards. In Week 9 (November 6) against Baltimore, Allen made three defensive and one special teams tackle. Allen left the Week 17 (January 1, 2012) game against the Cleveland Browns due to a shoulder injury. He did not return to that game and was inactive for the Steelers' Wild Card game. Allen finished his rookie season with 15 tackles. He regularly played on nickel and dime defenses. Defensive coordinator Dick LeBeau commented about Allen: "We always liked his size to speed ratio and he's got an innate feel for the ball."

=== 2012 ===
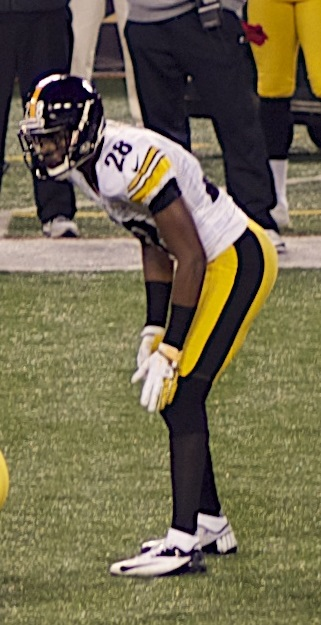
Allen with the Steelers in 2012

For the 2012 season, Allen played in 15 games with three starts. He had 55 tackles, 10 passes defended, 2 interceptions returned for 6 yards, and 3 forced fumbles. Twice in the season, Allen substituted for injured cornerback Ike Taylor. Allen made a career-high five tackles in Week 6 (October 11), a Thursday night match against the Tennessee Titans. In Week 16 (December 23) against the Cincinnati Bengals, Allen picked off two passes from Andy Dalton and returned the interceptions for a cumulative 6 yards. Allen also forced a fumble from Cincinnati receiver A. J. Green. In the season finale on Week 17 (December 30) against the Cleveland Browns, Allen forced two fumbles, both of which were followed by Steelers touchdowns. In the second quarter, Allen stripped a received ball from Josh Gordon, with Lawrence Timmons recovering. Then in the fourth quarter, Allen forced a fumble from Travis Benjamin after Benjamin caught a pass. Allen returned the fumble 21 yards and set up a possession that led to a touchdown.

=== 2013 ===
Allen played in 14 games in the 2013 season. Allen struggled with injuries during the 2013 season, as well as the return of veteran cornerback William Gay to the Steelers after a 1-year stint with the Arizona Cardinals. Allen scored his first touchdown against the Packers after intercepting a pass from Matt Flynn that was intended for Jarret Boykin. The Steelers won the game 38–31. Allen finished the season with 51 total tackles, 2 interceptions, 1 touchdown, and 13 pass deflections.

=== 2014 ===
On September 6, the Pittsburgh Steelers signed Allen to a five-year, $24.6 million contract extension that includes $9.75 million guaranteed and a signing bonus of $6.75 million. In Week 3 of the 2014 season, the Steelers lost cornerback Ike Taylor to a forearm injury. Allen stepped in as his replacement. While playing the Buccaneers the week after, he recorded 7 tackles as well as an interception. The next week, facing the Jaguars, he intercepted a pass from rookie quarterback Blake Bortles in the 2nd quarter. He finished the game with 7 tackles and an interception. On October 17, the Steelers benched Allen in favor of veteran Brice McCain.

=== 2015 ===
Allen played in one game for the Steelers in 2015. He was placed on injured reserve in October. He was released by the Steelers on April 15, 2016.

== NFL career statistics ==
Legend
**Bold**	Career high

Year	Team	Games		Tackles					Interceptions					Fumbles			
Year	Team	GP	GS	Cmb	Solo	Ast	Sck	TFL	Int	Yds	TD	Lng	PD	FF	FR	Yds	TD
2011	PIT	**15**	0	15	12	3	0.0	0	0	0	0	0	0	0	0	0	0
2012	PIT	**15**	3	**55**	43	**12**	0.0	0	**2**	6	0	6	10	**3**	**1**	**21**	0
2013	PIT	14	**8**	51	**44**	7	0.0	1	**2**	**43**	**1**	**40**	**13**	0	0	0	0
2014	PIT	11	7	41	36	5	0.0	**3**	**2**	27	0	27	11	0	**1**	0	0
2015	PIT	1	0	6	3	3	0.0	0	0	0	0	0	0	0	0	0	0
Career		56	18	168	138	30	0.0	4	6	76	1	40	34	3	2	21	0
