= Lanear Sampson =

American gridiron football player (born 1990)

UTEP Miners
- Title: Co-offensive coordinator/wide receivers scoach

Personal information
- Born: July 17, 1990 (age 36); Dallas, Texas, U.S.
- Listed height: 5 ft 11 in (1.80 m)
- Listed weight: 205 lb (93 kg)

Career information
- High school: Mesquite (Mesquite, Texas)
- College: Baylor
- NFL draft: 2013: undrafted

Career history

Playing
- Indianapolis Colts (2013)*; Dallas Cowboys (2013)*; Pittsburgh Steelers (2014)*; Ottawa Redblacks (2015)
- * Offseason or practice squad member only

Coaching
- Syracuse (2016–2017) Graduate assistant & quality control coach; Missouri State (2018) Wide receivers coach; McNeese (2019) Wide receivers coach; UCF (2020) Quality control coach; Syracuse (2021) Wide receivers coach; Austin Peay (2022) Pass game coordinator & wide receivers coach; Austin Peay (2023) Co-offensive coordinator & wide receivers coach; San Diego State (2024–2025) Pass game coordinator & wide receivers coach; UTEP (2026–present) Co-offensive coordinator & wide receivers coach
- Stats at Pro Football Reference
- Stats at CFL.ca (archive)

Lanear Sampson (born July 17, 1990) is an American college football coach and former player. He is the co-offensive coordinator and wide receivers coach for UTEP. He was previously the pass game coordinator and wide receivers coach for San Diego State. He also coached for Syracuse, Missouri State, McNeese, UCF, and Austin Peay. He played college football for Baylor and professionally for the Indianapolis Colts, the Dallas Cowboys, and the Pittsburgh Steelers of the National Football League (NFL), and the Ottawa Redblacks of the Canadian Football League (CFL) as a wide receiver.
