= Daniel McCullers =

American football player (born 1992)

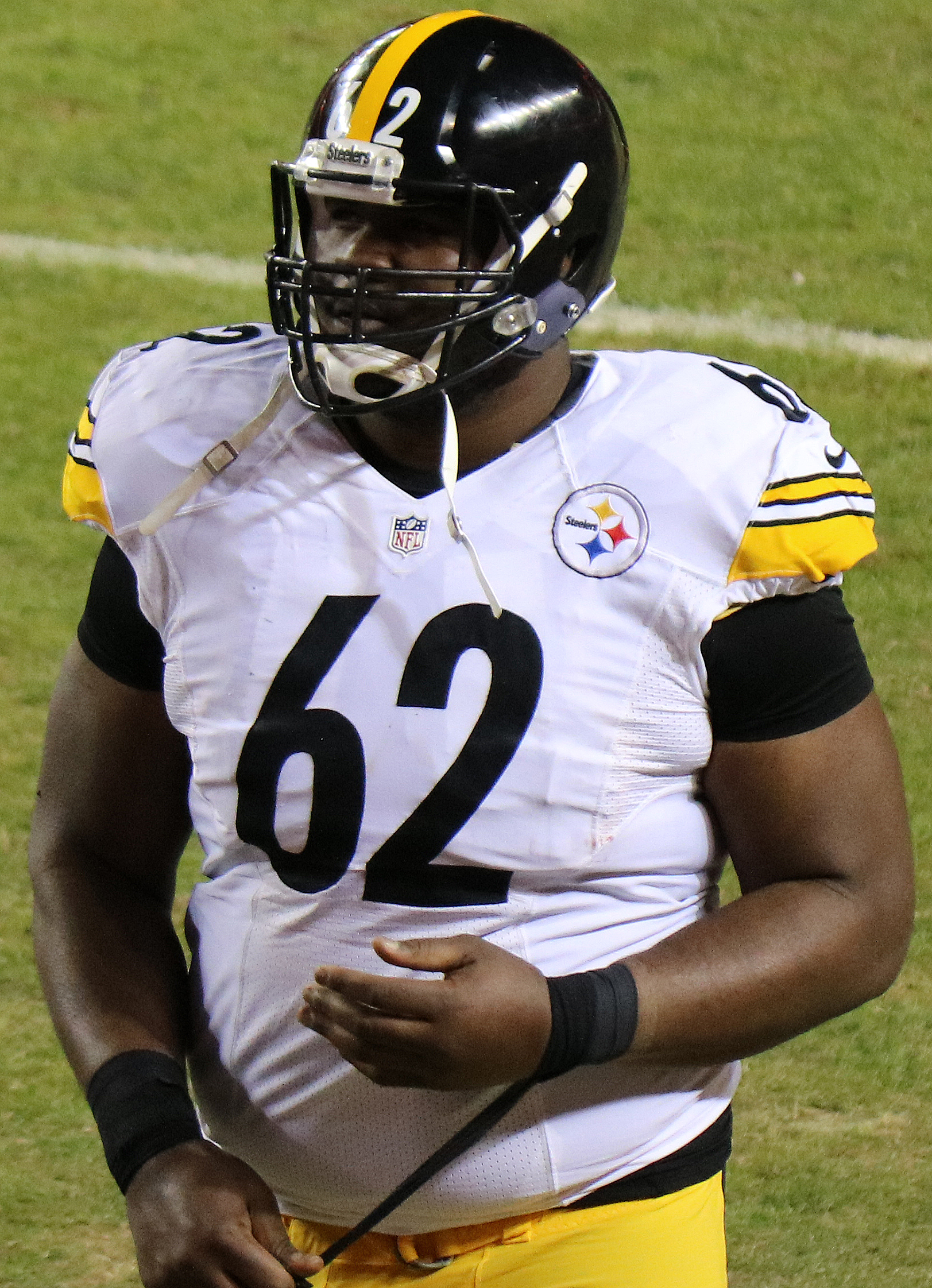
- McCullers with the Pittsburgh Steelers in 2015

No. 74, 92, 62, 93, 75
- Position: Nose tackle

Personal information
- Born: August 11, 1992 (age 34); Raleigh, North Carolina, U.S.
- Listed height: 6 ft 7 in (2.01 m)
- Listed weight: 352 lb (160 kg)

Career information
- High school: Southeast Raleigh
- College: Tennessee
- NFL draft: 2014: 6th round, 215th overall pick

Career history
- Pittsburgh Steelers (2014–2020); Chicago Bears (2020)

Career NFL statistics
- Total tackles: 44
- Sacks: 2.5
- Pass deflections: 2
- Stats at Pro Football Reference

Daniel Ray McCullers-Sanders (born August 11, 1992) is an American former professional football player who was a nose tackle in the National Football League (NFL). He was selected by the Pittsburgh Steelers in the sixth round of the 2014 NFL draft. He played college football for the Tennessee Volunteers.

== Early life ==
McCullers was born in Raleigh, North Carolina, on August 11, 1992, the son of Marcus Sanders and Phyllis McCullers. He has an older sister, Deonica, and a younger sister, Dakita. His parents were Phyllis McCullers and Marcus Sanders, him and his sisters spent much their childhood with their grandparents.

McCullers played high school football at Southeast Raleigh Magnet High School under Coach Daniel Finn and defensive coordinator Marvin Burke. He recorded 55 tackles and four sacks during his junior year in 2008, and was an all-conference selection. He followed this up with 29 tackles and five sacks during his senior year in 2009, in which he helped Southeast Raleigh to a 10–3 record. He was selected to the all-state second-team following his senior season.

== College career ==
Lacking the grades to enroll at a Division I school, McCullers played his freshman and sophomore seasons at Georgia Military College. During his freshman year in 2010, he picked up 27 tackles, including four tackles-for-loss, and one forced fumble. In 2011, during his sophomore year, he recorded 37 tackles, including nine tackles-for-loss and two sacks, as part of a defense that held opponents to just 261 yards per game. He was ranked a 4-star recruit by Rivals, and the number one junior college prospect at defensive tackle.

McCullers committed to Tennessee in January 2012, in part because the team was transitioning to a 3-4 defense, with which McCullers was more familiar with. He finished the 2012 season with 39 tackles (20 solo), including a sack and 5.5 tackles-for-loss, to go along with a forced fumble and a pass broken-up. He recorded eight tackles and blocked a PAT in Tennessee's loss against Georgia, and registered eight tackles in the Vols' loss to South Carolina.

After Tennessee head coach Derek Dooley was fired late in the 2012 season, there was speculation that McCullers would forgo his final year of eligibility and enter the NFL Draft. He decided to return for his senior year, however, even though the Vols' new head coach, Butch Jones, was planning to install a 4-3 defense. Recognizing the importance of McCullers making a successful transition to the new scheme, Jones stated prior to the 2013 season, "We'll be as good as Dan McCullers goes." He was named to the Athlon Sports Preseason Third-team All-SEC, and Phil Steele's Preseason Fourth Team All-American and Preseason First-team All-SEC. He finished the season with 33 tackles (21 solo), including 4.5 tackles-for-loss. He recorded six tackles in Tennessee's upset of South Carolina, including a sack that knocked quarterback Connor Shaw out of the game. He also blocked the second PAT of his career in the Vols' loss to Auburn. He appeared in the 2014 Senior Bowl.

While at Tennessee, McCullers received frequent attention for his enormous size. He was the subject of a USA Today feature in September 2012, and a photograph of McCullers towering over a Tennessee trainer was widely circulated on the web. He acquired numerous nicknames, such as "Mount McCullers", "Shade Tree" McCullers, "Big Dan," "Green Mile,"—after Michael Clarke Duncan's role in the 1999 film The Green Mile— and "Man Mountain."

== Professional career ==
=== Pre-draft ===
In February 2014, McCullers was one of five University of Tennessee players invited to participate in the 2014 NFL Combine. Weighing in at 352 lb (160 kg), McCullers was the heaviest player at an NFL Combine since Terrence Cody in 2010.

At Tennessee's NFL Pro Day on April 2, 2014, McCullers registered a best of 5.32 seconds in the 40-yard dash, 7.75 seconds in the 3-cone drill, and 5.14 seconds in the 20-yard shuttle. He also managed 27 repetitions in the 225-pound bench press. Mike Mayock, a draft analyst for the NFL Network, listed McCullers as one of the top five defensive tackle prospects in the draft. McCullers was selected by the Pittsburgh Steelers in the 6th round of the 2014 NFL draft.

Pre-draft measurables
Height	Weight	Arm length	Hand span	Vertical jump	Broad jump	Bench press
6 ft 6 3/4 in (2.00 m)	352 lb (160 kg)	36 5/8 in (0.93 m)	11 in (0.28 m)	20 1/2 in (0.52 m)	8 ft 1 in (2.46 m)	27 reps
All values from NFL Combine

=== Pittsburgh Steelers ===
McCullers signed a four-year contract with the Steelers on May 19, 2014. McCullers wore #74 during the preseason, then changed to #92 for the regular season, but then swapped his number to #62 when James Harrison, who had previously worn #92 with Pittsburgh, re-signed with the Steelers.

He made his NFL debut in the Steelers' win over Houston on October 20, 2014. During his rookie year in 2014, McCullers played nine games with one start making three tackles.

In his second season, he was limited to appearing in 12 games as a back-up to fellow defensive tackle Steve McLendon, and finished the season with eight tackles and half a sack. He missed four games due to a torn labrum and underwent surgery to repair it in March 2016. After McLendon signed with the New York Jets in the 2016 offseason, McCullers switched his jersey from #62 to #93 and competed for the starting defensive tackle position with rookie Javon Hargrave. Hargrave won the job, again putting McCullers at the backup role.

On October 16, 2016, McCullers recorded his first career blocked field goal against the Miami Dolphins, deflecting Andrew Franks' 24-yard attempt. On December 11, 2016, McCullers received his first start of the season in place of an injured Hargrave, who had received a concussion the previous game. He did not record a statistic during the 27–20 victory over the Buffalo Bills. On January 1, 2017, McCullers registered his first full career sack in the Steelers' regular season finale against the Cleveland Browns, tackling quarterback Robert Griffin III for a loss of 8 yards on a 3rd and 5 in the fourth quarter. The sack proved costly for the Browns, as Cody Parkey missed a 49-yard field goal on the following play in a game the Steelers would eventually win 27–24 in overtime.

On March 22, 2018, McCullers signed a one-year contract with the Steelers. He appeared in 15 games and made one start in the 2018 season. He recorded one sack on the season.

On March 15, 2019, McCullers signed a two-year, $2.75 million contract extension with the Steelers. He appeared in all 16 games in the 2019 season.

On September 5, 2020, McCullers was released by the Steelers and was signed to the practice squad the next day.

=== Chicago Bears ===
On September 24, 2020, McCullers was signed off the Steelers practice squad by the Chicago Bears to replace John Jenkins, who was placed on the injured reserve list due to a ligament tear in his thumb. When Jenkins returned from injured reserve on October 16, McCullers was released and re-signed to the practice squad. McCullers was elevated to the active roster on November 7 for the team's week 9 game against the Tennessee Titans, and reverted to the practice squad after the game. He was promoted to the active roster on November 16. He appeared in three games in the 2020 season.
