= Bryce Davis =

American football player (born 1989)

No. 45
- Position: Long snapper

Personal information
- Born: June 16, 1989 (age 37); Duncan, Oklahoma
- Listed height: 6 ft 3 in (1.91 m)
- Listed weight: 245 lb (111 kg)

Career information
- College: Central Oklahoma
- NFL draft: 2012: undrafted

Career history
- Cincinnati Bengals (2012–2013)*; Pittsburgh Steelers (2014)*
- * Offseason or practice squad member only
- Stats at Pro Football Reference

Bryce Davis is an American football player who is a center for the Pittsburgh Steelers in the National Football League. He previously played for the Cincinnati Bengals.
