= Rob Blanchflower =

American football player (born 1990)

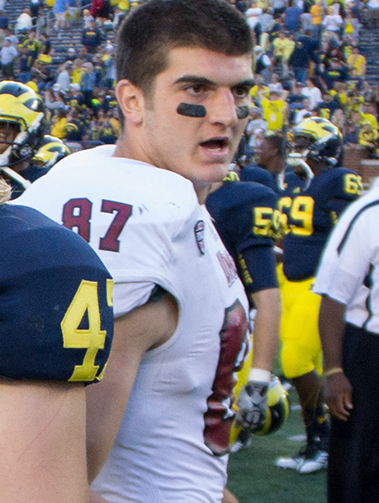
- Blanchflower with the UMass Minutemen in 2012

No. 87
- Position: Tight end

Personal information
- Born: June 8, 1990 (age 36); Leominster, Massachusetts, U.S.
- Listed height: 6 ft 4 in (1.93 m)
- Listed weight: 256 lb (116 kg)

Career information
- High school: Saint John's (Shrewsbury, Massachusetts)
- College: Massachusetts
- NFL draft: 2014: 7th round, 230th overall pick

Career history
- Pittsburgh Steelers (2014–2015)
- Stats at Pro Football Reference

Robert James Blanchflower (born June 8, 1990) is an American former professional football player who was a tight end in the National Football League (NFL). He was selected by the Pittsburgh Steelers in the seventh round of the 2014 NFL draft. He played college football for the UMass Minutemen.

== Early life ==
In high school, Blanchflower was on the football and basketball team and was teammates with former Philadelphia Eagles tight end Richard Rodgers. He also played with former Denver Broncos practice squad tight end, Dan Light, at St. John's, for the football team.

== Professional career ==
Blanchflower was selected by the Pittsburgh Steelers in the seventh round with the 230th overall pick in the 2014 NFL draft. On August 30, 2014, Blanchflower was among the final cuts for the Steelers. The next day, he was added to their practice squad. On January 5, 2015, the Steelers signed Blanchflower to a reserve/future contract. On August 6, 2015, he was waived/injured to make room for tight end Ray Hamilton. After he cleared waivers, he was placed on their injured reserve, ending his season. On February 16, 2016, the Steelers released Blanchflower.
