= Arthur Moats =

American football player (born 1988)

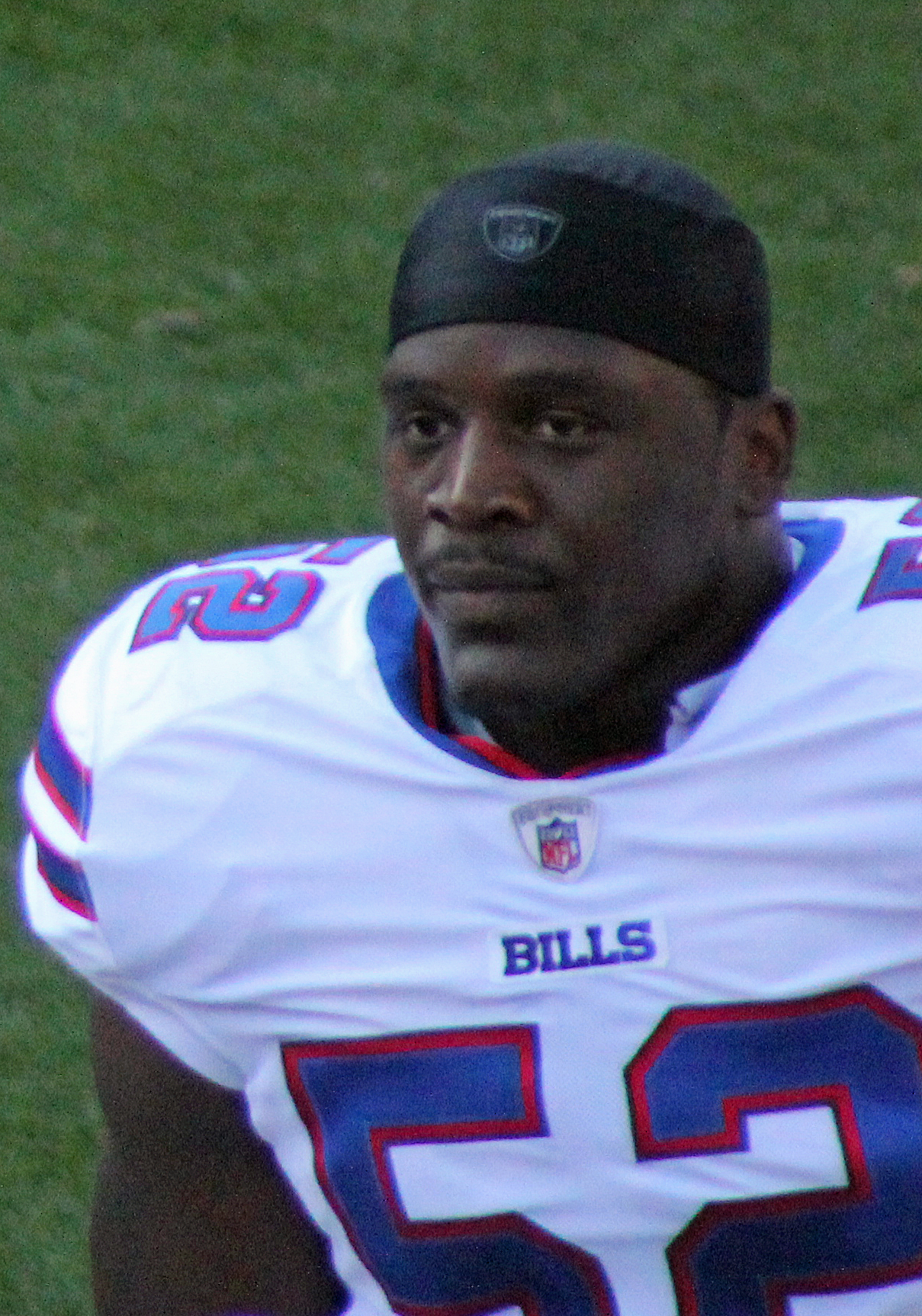
- Moats with the Buffalo Bills in 2011

No. 52, 55, 93
- Position: Linebacker

Personal information
- Born: March 14, 1988 (age 38); Norfolk, Virginia, U.S.
- Listed height: 6 ft 0 in (1.83 m)
- Listed weight: 246 lb (112 kg)

Career information
- High school: Churchland (Portsmouth, Virginia)
- College: James Madison (2006–2009)
- NFL draft: 2010: 6th round, 178th overall pick

Career history
- Buffalo Bills (2010–2013); Pittsburgh Steelers (2014–2017); Arizona Cardinals (2018)

Awards and highlights
- Buck Buchanan Award (2009); JMU Athletics Hall of Fame (2020)

Career NFL statistics
- Total tackles: 228
- Sacks: 16.5
- Forced fumbles: 4
- Fumble recoveries: 4
- Pass deflections: 6
- Stats at Pro Football Reference

Arthur Moats (born March 14, 1988) is an American former professional football player who was a linebacker in the National Football League (NFL) for the Buffalo Bills, Pittsburgh Steelers, and Arizona Cardinals. He was selected by the Bills in the sixth round of the 2010 NFL draft. Moats played college football for the James Madison Dukes, where he was team captain.

In 2010, as a member of the Bills, Moats delivered the hit on Minnesota Vikings quarterback Brett Favre that ultimately led to the end of Favre's NFL record streak of consecutive starts the following week at 297.

Moats hosts a football podcast, The Arthur Moats Experience With Deke.

== Early life ==
Moats was born in Norfolk, Virginia, and was raised in Portsmouth, Virginia, where he attended Churchland High School and graduated in 2006. He graduated from James Madison University with a degree in political science. Moats is currently in his second year of earning his master's degree online, saying he values education greatly. His father is a former marine and current high school math teacher.

== College career ==
Moats finished his career at James Madison University with 208 tackles. He played in all of his team's games as a true freshman. He started only 5 games as a sophomore, but became a full-time starter for his junior and senior years. Moats won the 2009 Buck Buchanan Award as the top FCS defensive player.

== Professional career ==
Pre-draft measurables
Height	Weight	Arm length	Hand span	40-yard dash	10-yard split	20-yard split	20-yard shuttle	Three-cone drill	Vertical jump	Broad jump	Bench press
6 ft 0 1/4 in (1.84 m)	246 lb (112 kg)	33 3/4 in (0.86 m)	8 5/8 in (0.22 m)	4.66 s	1.61 s	2.67 s	4.37 s	7.22 s	36.5 in (0.93 m)	10 ft 2 in (3.10 m)	24 reps
All values from NFL Combine

=== Buffalo Bills ===
Moats was selected by the Buffalo Bills in the sixth round, 178th overall, in the 2010 NFL draft. He is the only Buck Buchanan Award winner to be drafted by the Bills. In the Bills 3-4 defensive scheme, he moved from defensive end to inside linebacker, which is an unusual position change considering most defensive ends move to outside linebacker in 3-4 defensive schemes. After several weeks of failing to generate a consistent pass rush, Bills head coach Chan Gailey decided to move Moats to his more natural position of outside linebacker to utilize his pass rushing skill set.

In a Week 13 contest of the 2010 season, Moats delivered a hit on Minnesota Vikings quarterback Brett Favre that aggravated the quarterback's shoulder injury. It was Moats' hit that eventually led to Favre's consecutive starts streak ending at 297 when he did not play against the New York Giants the following week.

Moats' personal catch phrase, 'Don't Cross The Moats', was created by Joe Zogaib. Since then, it has a become a popular trending topic on Twitter, and Moats himself even tattooed the phrase across his upper back.

In December 2013, Moats was named the team's Walter Payton Man of the Year for 2013. Moats earned this honor through his work with the United Way of Buffalo and Erie County and other local groups. Moats was also named the Bills Ed Block Courage Award recipient. He earned this honor by overcoming adversity from an injury and exemplifying courage both on and off the field. He also conducts numerous school visits and takes part in the NFL Play 60 initiative.

=== Pittsburgh Steelers ===
On March 24, 2014, the Pittsburgh Steelers signed Moats to a one-year, $795,000 contract with a signing bonus of $65,000. He began his first season with the Pittsburgh Steelers as the backup right outside linebacker behind Jarvis Jones. In the season opener against the Cleveland Browns, he assisted in one tackle during his Steelers debut as they won 30-27. On September 21, 2014, Moats made two solo tackles and sacked Panthers quarterback Cam Newton as the Steelers routed the Carolina Panthers 37-19. The next game, he got his first start with the Steelers in place of an injured Jarvis Jones and made one solo tackle in a 24-27 loss to the Tampa Bay Buccaneers. In Week 9, Moats collected three combined tackles, sacked Ravens quarterback Joe Flacco, and forced a fumble as Pittsburgh defeated the Baltimore Ravens 43-23. The following week, he made a season-high four combined tackles in a 13-20 loss to the New York Jets. He finished the season with 23 combined tackles, four sacks, and two forced fumbles while appearing in all 16 regular season contests and starting ten.

On March 9, 2015, the Pittsburgh Steelers signed Moats to a three-year, $7.50 million contract with a signing bonus of $1.90 million. Moats began 2015 as the left outside linebacker ahead of rookie Bud Dupree. In the second game of the season, he made three combined tackles and was credited with half a sack after taking down San Francisco 49ers quarterback Colin Kaepernick while helping his team rout the 49ers 43-18. On January 3, 2016, Moats racked up a season-high six solo tackles and sacked Cleveland Browns quarterback Austin Davis, helping the Steelers win 28-12. On January 9, 2016, he collected five combined tackles as the Steelers defeated the Cincinnati Bengals 18-16 in an AFC Wild-card matchup. Moats finished the 2015 season with 35 combined tackles, four sacks, and two pass deflections and appeared in all 16 games and started 11.

Moats began the 2016 season as the backup left outside linebacker behind Bud Dupree. He started the season opener in place of an injured Dupree and made one tackle and a pass deflection in a 38-16 win over the Washington Redskins. The next game, Moats collected three combined tackles and sacked Cincinnati Bengals quarterback Andy Dalton, helping the Steelers win 24-16. On November 20, 2016, Moats made two solo tackles and sacked Cleveland Browns quarterback Josh McCown twice, as the Steelers defeated the Browns 24-9.

Throughout the first 12 games of the 2017 season, Moats played almost exclusively on special teams, with only 47 snaps on defense. Following injuries to Ryan Shazier and Tyler Matakevich on December 4 against the Cincinnati Bengals, Moats was moved to left inside linebacker, splitting time with Sean Spence and L. J. Fort for the Steelers' December 10 game against the Baltimore Ravens.

=== Arizona Cardinals ===
On July 25, 2018, Moats signed a one-year contract with the Arizona Cardinals. He was placed on injured reserve with a sprained MCL on September 1, 2018. He was released on October 9, 2018.

On June 10, 2019 Moats officially announced his retirement from the NFL via Instagram and Twitter.

== NFL career statistics ==
Legend
**Bold**	Career high

=== Regular season ===
Year	Team	Games		Tackles					Interceptions					Fumbles			
Year	Team	GP	GS	Cmb	Solo	Ast	Sck	TFL	Int	Yds	TD	Lng	PD	FF	FR	Yds	TD
2010	BUF	15	4	33	18	15	2.5	1	0	0	0	0	1	1	0	0	0
2011	BUF	14	0	29	15	14	2.5	1	0	0	0	0	0	1	1	0	0
2012	BUF	14	4	25	17	8	0.0	1	0	0	0	0	0	0	0	0	0
2013	BUF	**16**	**12**	**54**	**30**	**24**	0.0	1	0	0	0	0	0	0	0	0	0
2014	PIT	**16**	9	23	17	6	**4.0**	**4**	0	0	0	0	0	**2**	1	0	0
2015	PIT	**16**	11	35	24	11	**4.0**	**4**	0	0	0	0	2	0	**2**	**3**	0
2016	PIT	**16**	5	21	9	12	3.5	3	0	0	0	0	**3**	0	0	0	0
2017	PIT	14	0	8	6	2	0.0	0	0	0	0	0	0	0	0	0	0
		121	45	228	136	92	16.5	15	0	0	0	0	6	4	4	3	0

=== Playoffs ===
Year	Team	Games		Tackles					Interceptions					Fumbles			
Year	Team	GP	GS	Cmb	Solo	Ast	Sck	TFL	Int	Yds	TD	Lng	PD	FF	FR	Yds	TD
2014	PIT	1	0	1	0	1	0.0	0	0	0	0	0	0	0	0	0	0
2015	PIT	2	0	**5**	**3**	**2**	0.0	0	0	0	0	0	0	0	0	0	0
2016	PIT	**3**	0	1	0	1	0.0	0	0	0	0	0	0	0	0	0	0
2017	PIT	1	0	0	0	0	0.0	0	0	0	0	0	0	0	0	0	0
		7	0	7	3	4	0.0	0	0	0	0	0	0	0	0	0	0
