= 2017 Pittsburgh Steelers season =

85th season in franchise history; first with T.J. Watt

- Owner: The Rooney Family
- General manager: Kevin Colbert
- Head coach: Mike Tomlin
- Offensive coordinator: Todd Haley
- Defensive coordinator: Keith Butler
- Home stadium: Heinz Field

Results
- Record: 13–3
- Division place: 1st AFC North
- Playoffs: Lost Divisional Playoffs (vs. Jaguars) 42–45
- All-Pros: 5: WR Antonio Brown (1st team); FLEX Le'Veon Bell (1st team); RG David DeCastro (1st team); DT Cameron Heyward (1st team); RB Le'Veon Bell (2nd team)
- Pro Bowlers: 10: QB Ben Roethlisberger; RB Le'Veon Bell; FB Roosevelt Nix; WR Antonio Brown; T Alejandro Villanueva; G David DeCastro; C Maurkice Pouncey; DE Cameron Heyward; ILB Ryan Shazier; K Chris Boswell
- Team MVP: Antonio Brown
- Team ROY: JuJu Smith-Schuster

Uniform
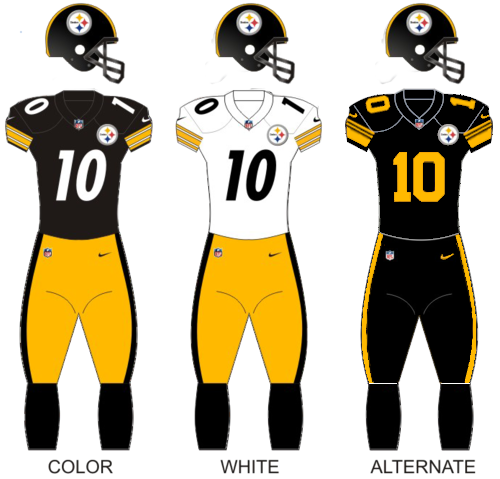

The 2017 season was the Pittsburgh Steelers' 85th in the National Football League (NFL). It was the 18th season under leadership of general manager Kevin Colbert and the eleventh under head coach Mike Tomlin. It was also the Steelers' first full season since the death of Dan Rooney.

The Steelers clinched the AFC North division title for the second consecutive season with a 39–38 win over the Baltimore Ravens in Week 14, and secured a first-round playoff bye for the first time since 2010 following a 34–6 win over the Houston Texans on Christmas Day in Week 16. In the Divisional Round however, the Steelers suffered a loss to the Jacksonville Jaguars by a score of 45–42 after falling behind 28–14 at halftime. After their loss, the Steelers were criticized for looking past the Jaguars and anticipating a rematch with the New England Patriots. With a record of 13–3, the Steelers posted their best mark since 2004, as well as their first 13–3 record since 2001. The Steelers were also the solitary team in 2017 that swept their division. This was the best record posted by a Mike Tomlin-led Steeler team.

== Transactions ==
The Steelers were involved in the following transactions during the 2017 season:

=== Trades ===
Player	Acquired from	Traded to	Date	Trade terms
CB Dashaun Phillips	Washington Redskins		August 23, 2017	C Lucas Crowley
TE Vance McDonald	San Francisco 49ers		August 29, 2017	San Francisco receives Pittsburgh's 2018 4th Rd. pick Pittsburgh receives San Francisco's 2018 5th Rd. pick
WR Sammie Coates		Cleveland Browns	September 2, 2017	Pittsburgh receives Cleveland's 2018 6th Rd. pick Cleveland receives Pittsburgh's 2019 7th Rd. pick
CB Ross Cockrell		New York Giants	September 2, 2017	2018 conditional pick
SS J. J. Wilcox	Tampa Bay Buccaneers		September 3, 2017	Tampa Bay receives Pittsburgh's 2018 6th Rd. pick Pittsburgh receives Tampa Bay's 2019 7th Rd. pick

=== Free agents ===
Player	Acquired from	Lost to	Date	Contract terms
WR Markus Wheaton		Chicago Bears	March 9, 2017	2 years/$11.0 million
ILB Lawrence Timmons		Miami Dolphins	March 10, 2017	2 years/$12.0 million
OLB Jarvis Jones		Arizona Cardinals	March 14, 2017	1 year/$2.25 million
SS Shamarko Thomas		New York Jets	June 2, 2017	1 year/$775,000
WR Justin Hunter	Buffalo Bills		March 15, 2017	1 year/$855,000
RB Knile Davis	Kansas City Chiefs		March 20, 2017	1 year/$755,000
CB Coty Sensabaugh	New York Giants		March 20, 2017	2 years/$2.6 million
NT Tyson Alualu	Jacksonville Jaguars		March 21, 2017	2 years/$6.0 million
SS Daimion Stafford	Tennessee Titans		May 30, 2017	1 year/$775,000

=== Signings ===
Player	Date	Contract terms
RB Brandon Brown-Dukes	January 24, 2017	(Reserve/Future)
CB Brandon Dixon	January 24, 2017	(Reserve/Future)
T Matt Feiler	January 24, 2017	(Reserve/Future)
FS Jacob Hagen	January 24, 2017	(Reserve/Future)
CB Mike Hilton	January 24, 2017	(Reserve/Future)
FB Gus Johnson	January 24, 2017	(Reserve/Future)
T Keavon Milton	January 24, 2017	(Reserve/Future)
RB Dreamius Smith	January 24, 2017	(Reserve/Future)
WR Marcus Tucker	January 24, 2017	(Reserve/Future)
RB Karlos Williams	January 24, 2017	(Reserve/Future)
FB Roosevelt Nix	January 26, 2017	1-year extension/$615,000
WR Cobi Hamilton	January 27, 2017	1-year extension/$540,000
NT Farrington Huguenin	January 27, 2017	(Reserve/Future)
SS Jordan Dangerfield	January 28, 2017	1-year extension/$540,000
CB Greg Ducre	January 30, 2017	(Reserve/Future)
LS Greg Warren	February 2, 2017	1-year extension/$1.08 million
K Chris Boswell	February 2, 2017	1-year extension/$615,000
TE Xavier Grimble	February 7, 2017	1-year extension/$540,000
ILB Akil Blount	February 14, 2017	(Reserve/Future)
OLB Jason Fanaika	February 14, 2017	(Reserve/Future)
C Kyle Friend	February 14, 2017	(Reserve/Future)
CB Devonte Johnson	February 14, 2017	(Reserve/Future)
C Mike Matthews	February 14, 2017	(Reserve/Future)
RB Trey Williams	February 14, 2017	(Reserve/Future)
OLB Anthony Chickillo	February 14, 2017	1-year extension/$615,000
RB Fitzgerald Toussaint	February 14, 2017	1-year extension/$690,000
ILB Steven Johnson	February 15, 2017	1-year extension/$775,000
LS Kameron Canaday	February 21, 2017	(Reserve/Future)
P A. J. Hughes	February 21, 2017	(Reserve/Future)
TE Ryan Malleck	February 21, 2017	(Reserve/Future)
RB Le'Veon Bell	February 27, 2017	1-year extension/$12.12 million (Exclusive rights franchise tag)
OLB James Harrison	March 1, 2017	2-year extension/$3.5 million
G B. J. Finney	March 8, 2017	1-year extension/$540,000
QB Landry Jones	March 9, 2017	2-year extension/$4.4 million
TE David Johnson	March 9, 2017	2-year extension/$2.05 million
NT Nelson Adams	April 29, 2017	(UDFA)
NT Christian Brown	April 29, 2017	(UDFA)
G Ethan Cooper	April 29, 2017	(UDFA)
DE Francis Kallon	April 29, 2017	(UDFA)
DE Keith Kelsey	April 29, 2017	(UDFA)
TE Scott Orndoff	April 29, 2017	(UDFA)
QB Nick Schuessler	April 29, 2017	(UDFA)
RB Rushel Shell	April 29, 2017	(UDFA)
FS Terrish Webb	April 29, 2017	(UDFA)
T Jake Rodgers	May 5, 2017	1 year
TE Phazahn Odom	May 16, 2017	1 year
ILB Matt Galambos	May 16, 2017	1 year
QB Bart Houston	May 17, 2017	1 year
WR Canaan Severin	May 17, 2017	1 year
RB Terrell Watson	May 18, 2017	1 year
SS Daimion Stafford	May 30, 2017	1 year
LS Kameron Canaday	May 30, 2017	1 year
RB Brandon Brown-Dukes	June 14, 2017	1 year
T Alejandro Villanueva	July 28, 2017	4-year extension/$24.0 million
TE Jake McGee	August 2, 2017	1 year
CB JaCorey Shepherd	August 5, 2017	1 year
C Ruben Carter	August 25, 2017	1 year
CB Joe Haden	August 30, 2017	3 years/$27.0 million
C Kyle Friend	September 3, 2017	Practice Squad
ILB Matt Galambos	September 3, 2017	Practice Squad
FS Jacob Hagen	September 3, 2017	Practice Squad
NT Lavon Hooks	September 3, 2017	Practice Squad
NT Farrington Huguenin	September 3, 2017	Practice Squad
TE Jake McGee	September 3, 2017	Practice Squad
CB Dashaun Phillips	September 3, 2017	Practice Squad
RB Fitzgerald Toussaint	September 3, 2017	Practice Squad
WR Marcus Tucker	September 3, 2017	Practice Squad
WR Justin Thomas	September 3, 2017	Practice Squad
ILB Steven Johnson	September 4, 2017	1 year
DE Stephon Tuitt	September 9, 2017	5-year extension/$60.0 million
ILB Steven Johnson	September 12, 2017	1 year
ILB L. J. Fort	September 13, 2017	Practice Squad
T Jake Rodgers	September 20, 2017	Practice Squad
ILB L.J. Fort	September 23, 2017	1 year
ILB Matt Galambos	September 26, 2017	Practice Squad
WR Justin Thomas	September 26, 2017	Practice Squad
DE Keith Kelsey	September 28, 2017	Practice Squad
SS Jordan Dangerfield	October 16, 2017	Practice Squad
T Jake Rodgers	October 18, 2017	Practice Squad
WR Justin Thomas	November 6, 2017	Practice Squad
T Jake Rodgers	November 20, 2017	Practice Squad
RB Fitzgerald Toussaint	November 25, 2017	1 year
RB Terrell Watson	November 27, 2017	Practice Squad
ILB Sean Spence	December 5, 2017	1 year
RB Stevan Ridley	December 19, 2017	1 year
WR Justin Thomas	December 21, 2017	Practice Squad

=== Cuts ===
Position	Player	Date
CB	Justin Gilbert	February 6, 2017
RB	Karlos Williams	March 9, 2017
OLB	Jason Fanaika	April 19, 2017
QB	Zach Mettenberger	May 1, 2017
RB	Brandon Brown-Dukes	May 2, 2017
FB	Gus Johnson	May 2, 2017
WR	Canaan Severin	May 2, 2017
CB	Al-Hajj Shabazz	May 2, 2017
WR	Dez Stewart	May 5, 2017
LS	Kameron Canaday	May 5, 2017
WR	Dez Stewart	May 11, 2017
RB	Dreamius Smith	May 12, 2017
CB	Devonte Johnson	May 16, 2017
TE	Ryan Malleck	May 16, 2017
ILB	Akil Blount	May 17, 2017
QB	Nick Schuessler	May 17, 2017
TE	Ladarius Green	May 18, 2017
LS	Greg Warren	May 18, 2017
P	A. J. Hughes	May 30, 2017
RB	Rushel Shell	June 18, 2017
TE	Scott Orndoff	August 2, 2017
DE	Nelson Adams	August 5, 2017
C	Mike Matthews	August 8, 2017
WR	Canaan Severin	August 14, 2017
CB	Greg Ducre	August 23, 2017
RB	Brandon Brown-Dukes	August 23, 2017
DE	Christian Brown	August 29, 2017
TE	Phazahn Odom	August 29, 2017
WR	Demarcus Ayers	September 2, 2017
C	Ruben Carter	September 2, 2017
G	Ethan Cooper	September 2, 2017
RB	Knile Davis	September 2, 2017
CB	Brandon Dixon	September 2, 2017
C	Kyle Friend	September 2, 2017
ILB	Matt Galambos	September 2, 2017
OLB	Austin Gearing	September 2, 2017
FS	Malik Golden	September 2, 2017
CB	Senquez Golson	September 2, 2017
FS	Jacob Hagen	September 2, 2017
WR	Cobi Hamilton	September 2, 2017
LS	Colin Holba	September 2, 2017
NT	Lavon Hooks	September 2, 2017
QB	Bart Houston	September 2, 2017
NT	Farrington Huguenin	September 2, 2017
TE	David Johnson	September 2, 2017
ILB	Steven Johnson	September 2, 2017
DE	Francis Kallon	September 2, 2017
DE	Keith Kelsey	September 2, 2017
NT	Johnny Maxey	September 2, 2017
TE	Jake McGee	September 2, 2017
T	Brian Mihalik	September 2, 2017
T	Keavon Milton	September 2, 2017
CB	Dashaun Phillips	September 2, 2017
NT	Roy Philon	September 2, 2017
T	Jake Rodgers	September 2, 2017
CB	JaCorey Shepherd	September 2, 2017
WR	Justin Thomas	September 2, 2017
RB	Fitzgerald Toussaint	September 2, 2017
WR	Marcus Tucker	September 2, 2017
FS	Terrish Webb	September 2, 2017
RB	Trey Williams	September 2, 2017
SS	Jordan Dangerfield	September 4, 2017
ILB	Steven Johnson	September 9, 2017
ILB	L. J. Fort	September 12, 2017
ILB	Matt Galambos	September 13, 2017
WR	Justin Thomas	September 20, 2017
ILB	Steven Johnson	September 23, 2017
T	Jake Rodgers	September 26, 2017
ILB	Matt Galambos	September 29, 2017
FS	Jacob Hagen	October 16, 2017
WR	Justin Thomas	October 18, 2017
T	Jake Rodgers	November 6, 2017
WR	Justin Thomas	November 20, 2017
RB	Terrell Watson	November 25, 2017
T	Jake Rodgers	December 21, 2017
OLB	James Harrison	December 23, 2017

=== Other ===
Name	Date	Details
T Ryan Harris	March 3, 2017	Retired

== Draft ==
2017 Pittsburgh Steelers draft
Round	Pick	Player	Position	College	Notes
1	30	T. J. Watt *	Linebacker	Wisconsin	
2	62	JuJu Smith-Schuster *	Wide receiver	USC	
3	94	Cameron Sutton	Cornerback	Tennessee	
3	105	James Conner *	Running back	Pittsburgh	
4	135	Josh Dobbs	Quarterback	Tennessee	
5	173	Brian Allen	Free Safety	Utah	
6	213	Colin Holba	Long snapper	Louisville	
7	248	Keion Adams	Linebacker	Western Michigan	
Made roster * Made at least one Pro Bowl during career

Notes

- As the result of a negative differential of free agent signings and departures that the Steelers experienced during the 2016 free agency period, the team received one compensatory selection at the end of the 3rd round for the 2017 draft.

== Staff ==
2017 Pittsburgh Steelers staff
Front office: President – Art Rooney II; Vice president – Art Rooney Jr.; Vice president & general manager – Kevin Colbert; Vice president of football and business administration – Omar Khan; Football administration coordinator – Samir Suleiman; Player personnel coordinator – Dan Rooney Jr.; College scouting coordinator – Phil Kreidler; Senior assistant, college scouting – Rick Reiprish; Pro personnel coordinator – Brandon Hunt; Analytics and football research coordinator – Karim Kassam; Head coaches: Head coach – Mike Tomlin; Assistant head coach/defensive line – John Mitchell; Offensive coaches: Offensive coordinator – Todd Haley; Quarterbacks – Randy Fichtner; Running backs – James Saxon; Wide receivers – Richard Mann; Tight ends – James Daniel; Offensive line – Mike Munchak; Offensive assistant – Shaun Sarrett	Defensive coaches: Defensive coordinator – Keith Butler; Inside linebackers – Jerry Olsavsky; Outside linebackers – Joey Porter; Defensive backs – Carnell Lake; Coaching assistant – Steve Meyer; Special teams coaches: Special teams coordinator – Danny Smith; Strength and conditioning: Strength and conditioning – Garrett Giemont

== Final roster ==
2017 Pittsburgh Steelers roster
Quarterbacks (QB): 5 Joshua Dobbs; 3 Landry Jones; 7 Ben Roethlisberger; Running backs (RB): 26 Le'Veon Bell; 45 Roosevelt Nix FB; 38 Stevan Ridley; 33 Fitzgerald Toussaint; Wide receivers (WR): 84 Antonio Brown; 10 Martavis Bryant; 88 Darrius Heyward-Bey; 11 Justin Hunter; 17 Eli Rogers; 19 JuJu Smith-Schuster; Tight ends (TE): 85 Xavier Grimble; 81 Jesse James; 89 Vance McDonald	Offensive linemen (OL): 66 David DeCastro G; 71 Matt Feiler G; 67 B. J. Finney G/C; 73 Ramon Foster G; 77 Marcus Gilbert T; 65 Jerald Hawkins T; 74 Chris Hubbard T; 53 Maurkice Pouncey C; 78 Alejandro Villanueva T; Defensive linemen (DL): 94 Tyson Alualu DE; 79 Javon Hargrave NT; 97 Cameron Heyward DE; 93 Daniel McCullers NT; 91 Stephon Tuitt DE; 96 L. T. Walton DE	Linebackers (LB): 56 Anthony Chickillo OLB; 48 Bud Dupree OLB; 54 L. J. Fort ILB; 44 Tyler Matakevich ILB; 55 Arthur Moats OLB; 51 Sean Spence ILB; 90 T. J. Watt OLB; 98 Vince Williams ILB; Defensive backs (DB): 29 Brian Allen SS; 25 Artie Burns CB; 28 Sean Davis SS; 22 William Gay CB; 20 Robert Golden FS; 21 Joe Haden CB; 31 Mike Hilton CB; 23 Mike Mitchell FS; 24 Coty Sensabaugh CB; 34 Cameron Sutton CB; 27 J. J. Wilcox FS; Special teams (ST): 4 Jordan Berry P; 9 Chris Boswell K; 57 Kameron Canaday LS	Practice squad: 37 Jordan Dangerfield SS; 61 Kyle Friend C; 95 Lavon Hooks NT; 41 Farrington Huguenin OLB; 57 Keith Kelsey ILB; 80 Jake McGee TE; 35 Dashaun Phillips CB; 13 Justin Thomas WR; 16 Marcus Tucker WR; 39 Terrell Watson RB; Reserve: 99 Keion Adams OLB (IR); 30 James Conner RB (IR); 34 Antonio Crawford CB (IR); 38 Greg Ducre CB (IR); 62 Mike Matthews C (IR); 50 Ryan Shazier ILB (IR); Rookies in italics 53 active, 6 reserve, 10 practice squad

== Preseason ==
Week	Date	Opponent	Result	Record	Venue	Recap
1	August 11	at New York Giants	W 20–12	1–0	MetLife Stadium	Recap
2	August 20	Atlanta Falcons	W 17–13	2–0	Heinz Field	Recap
3	August 26	Indianapolis Colts	L 15–19	2–1	Heinz Field	Recap
4	August 31	at Carolina Panthers	W 17–14	3–1	Bank of America Stadium	Recap

== Regular season ==
=== Schedule ===
The Steelers' regular season schedule was announced on April 20.

Week	Date	Opponent	Result	Record	Venue	Recap
1	September 10	at **Cleveland Browns**	**W** 21–18	1–0	FirstEnergy Stadium	Recap
2	September 17	Minnesota Vikings	**W** 26–9	2–0	Heinz Field	Recap
3	September 24	at Chicago Bears	**L** 17–23 (OT)	2–1	Soldier Field	Recap
4	October 1	at **Baltimore Ravens**	**W** 26–9	3–1	M&T Bank Stadium	Recap
5	October 8	Jacksonville Jaguars	**L** 9–30	3–2	Heinz Field	Recap
6	October 15	at Kansas City Chiefs	**W** 19–13	4–2	Arrowhead Stadium	Recap
7	October 22	**Cincinnati Bengals**	**W** 29–14	5–2	Heinz Field	Recap
8	October 29	at Detroit Lions	**W** 20–15	6–2	Ford Field	Recap
9	Bye					
10	November 12	at Indianapolis Colts	**W** 20–17	7–2	Lucas Oil Stadium	Recap
11	November 16	Tennessee Titans	**W** 40–17	8–2	Heinz Field	Recap
12	November 26	Green Bay Packers	**W** 31–28	9–2	Heinz Field	Recap
13	December 4	at **Cincinnati Bengals**	**W** 23–20	10–2	Paul Brown Stadium	Recap
14	December 10	**Baltimore Ravens**	**W** 39–38	11–2	Heinz Field	Recap
15	December 17	New England Patriots	**L** 24–27	11–3	Heinz Field	Recap
16	December 25	at Houston Texans	**W** 34–6	12–3	NRG Stadium	Recap
17	December 31	**Cleveland Browns**	**W** 28–24	13–3	Heinz Field	Recap

Note: Intra-division opponents are in bold text.

=== Game summaries ===
==== Week 1: at Cleveland Browns ====
Week One: Pittsburgh Steelers at Cleveland Browns – Game summary

Quarter	1	2	3	4	Total
**Steelers**	7	7	7	0	**21**
Browns	7	0	3	8	**18**

at FirstEnergy Stadium, Cleveland, Ohio

- Date: September 10
- Game time: 1:00 p.m. EDT
- Game weather: 63 °F (17 °C), sunny
- Game attendance: 67,431
- Referee: Craig Wrolstad
- TV announcers (CBS): Greg Gumbel, Trent Green and Jamie Erdahl
- Recap, Gamebook

Game information

**First quarter**

- PIT – Britton Colquitt punt blocked by Tyler Matakevich, ball recovered in CLE end zone by Anthony Chickillo for touchdown (Chris Boswell kick), 12:44. Steelers 7–0.
- CLE – DeShone Kizer 1-yard run (Zane Gonzalez kick), 0:24. Tied 7–7. **Drive: 12 plays, 68 yards, 5:26.**

**Second quarter**

- PIT – Jesse James 4-yard pass from Ben Roethlisberger (Chris Boswell kick), 0:49. Steelers 14–7. **Drive: 7 plays, 91 yards, 3:08.**

**Third quarter**

- CLE – Zane Gonzalez 24-yard field goal, 9:31. Steelers 14–10. **Drive: 7 plays, 53 yards, 4:29.**
- PIT – Jesse James 2-yard pass from Ben Roethlisberger (Chris Boswell kick), 5:43. Steelers 21–10. **Drive: 6 plays, 75 yards, 3:50.**

**Fourth quarter**

- CLE – Corey Coleman 3-yard pass from Deshone Kizer (Isaiah Crowell run), 3:40. Steelers 21–18. **Drive: 8 plays, 73 yards, 3:05.**

**Top passers**

- PIT – Ben Roethlisberger – 24/36, 263 yards, 2 TD, 1 INT
- CLE – DeShone Kizer – 20/30, 222 yards, 1 TD, 1 INT

**Top rushers**

- PIT – Le'Veon Bell – 10 rushes, 32 yards
- CLE – Isaiah Crowell – 17 rushes, 33 yards

**Top receivers**

- PIT – Antonio Brown – 11 receptions, 182 yards
- CLE – Corey Coleman – 5 receptions, 53 yards, 1 TD

**Top tacklers**

- PIT – T. J. Watt – 7 total tackles, 6 solo, 2 sacks, 1 INT
- CLE – Joe Schobert – 9 total tackles, 4 solo

The Steelers started their season on the road against the Browns. They scored first in the first quarter when Tyler Matakevich blocked a punt and Anthony Chickillo recovered it for a touchdown for a 7–0 lead. Later on in the quarter, DeShone Kizer ran for a 1-yard touchdown to tie the game up 7–7. In the second quarter, the Steelers retook the lead when Ben Roethlisberger found Jesse James on a 4-yard pass to make it 14–7 at halftime. After the break, the Browns came closer in the third quarter when Zane Gonzalez nailed a 24-yard field goal to make it 14–10. Though the Steelers moved ahead by double digits when Roethlisberger found James again on a 2-yard pass to make it 21–10. The Browns tried to rally in the fourth quarter but could only come up with 8 when Kizer found Corey Coleman on a 3-yard pass with a 2-point conversion tacked on to make the final score 21–18.

With their 5th straight win over the Browns, the Steelers started their season 1–0. It also took the team's regular season winning streak to 8 straight while taking their winning streak against division rivals to 5 straight. With his eleventh win at the stadium, Roethlisberger surpassed Derek Anderson as the quarterback with the most wins in Cleveland since the team's 1999 reactivation, despite playing for their divisional rival.

==== Week 2: vs. Minnesota Vikings ====
Week Two: Minnesota Vikings at Pittsburgh Steelers – Game summary

Quarter	1	2	3	4	Total
Vikings	0	3	6	0	**9**
**Steelers**	7	7	6	6	**26**

at Heinz Field, Pittsburgh, Pennsylvania

- Date: September 17
- Game time: 1:00 pm. EDT
- Game weather: 78 °F (26 °C), sunny
- Game attendance: 65,971
- Referee: Pete Morelli
- TV announcers (Fox): Kenny Albert, Ronde Barber and Kristina Pink
- Recap, Gamebook

Game information

**First quarter**

- PIT – Martavis Bryant 27-yard pass from Ben Roethlisberger (Chris Boswell kick), 3:02. Steelers 7–0. **Drive: 9 plays, 78 yards, 5:43.**

**Second quarter**

- PIT – JuJu Smith-Schuster 4-yard pass from Ben Roethlisberger (Chris Boswell kick), 13:31. Steelers 14–0. **Drive: 5 plays, 60 yards, 3:12.**
- MIN – Kai Forbath 42-yard field goal, 8:50. Steelers 14–3. **Drive: 11 plays, 51 yards, 4:41.**

**Third quarter**

- PIT – Chris Boswell 46-yard field goal, 12:19. Steelers 17–3. **Drive: 4 plays, 8 yards, 2:06.**
- MIN – C. J. Ham 1-yard run (Kai Forbath kick failed), 9:57. Steelers 17–9. **Drive: 6 plays, 82 yards, 2:22.**
- PIT – Chris Boswell 29-yard field goal, 5:05. Steelers 20–9. **Drive: 10 plays, 74 yards, 4:52.**

**Fourth quarter**

- PIT – Chris Boswell 37-yard field goal, 3:18. Steelers 23–9. **Drive: 11 plays, 64 yards, 4:44.**
- PIT – Chris Boswell 43-yard field goal, 1:53. Steelers 26–9. **Drive: 4 plays, 5 yards, 0:20.**

**Top passers**

- MIN – Case Keenum – 20/37, 167 yards
- PIT – Ben Roethlisberger – 23/35, 243 yards, 2 TD

**Top rushers**

- MIN – Dalvin Cook – 12 rushes, 64 yards
- PIT – Le'Veon Bell – 27 rushes, 87 yards

**Top receivers**

- MIN – Adam Thielen – 5 receptions, 44 yards
- PIT – Antonio Brown – 5 receptions, 62 yards

**Top tacklers**

- MIN – Andrew Sendejo – 10 total tackles, 8 solo
- PIT – Sean Davis – 8 total tackles, 7 solo

After a tough road win, the Steelers traveled home to take on the Vikings. In the first quarter, the Steelers would score first as Ben Roethlisberger found Martavis Bryant on a 27-yard pass to make it 7–0 for the only score of the period. They increased their lead in the second quarter when Roethlisberger found JuJu Smith-Schuster on a 4-yard pass to make it 14–0. The Vikes then got on the board later on in the quarter when Kai Forbath kicked a 42-yard field goal to make it 14–3 at halftime. In the third quarter, the Steelers went back to work as Chris Boswell kicked a 46-yard field goal to make it 17–3. The Vikes drew closer when C.J. Ham ran for a 1-yard touchdown (with a failed PAT) to make it 17–9. The Steelers however pulled away later on in the quarter when Boswell kicked a 29-yard field goal to make it 20–9. In the fourth quarter, it was all Steelers as they closed out the game with 2 more field goals: from 37 and 43 yards out to make it 23–9 and the eventual final score 26–9.

With the win, the Steelers improved to 2–0. The team's regular season winning streak also increased to 9 straight.

The 17-point margin of victory marked the largest by Pittsburgh over Minnesota in series history.

==== Week 3: at Chicago Bears ====
Week Three: Pittsburgh Steelers at Chicago Bears – Game summary

Quarter	1	2	3	4	OT	Total
Steelers	0	7	7	3	0	**17**
**Bears**	7	10	0	0	6	**23**

at Soldier Field, Chicago, Illinois

- Date: September 24
- Game time: 12:00 pm. CDT
- Game weather: 85 °F (29 °C), sunny
- Game attendance: 62,172
- Referee: Clete Blakeman
- TV announcers (CBS): Greg Gumbel, Trent Green and Jamie Erdahl
- Recap, Gamebook

Game information

**First quarter**

- CHI – Jordan Howard 3-yard run (Connor Barth kick), 9:09. Bears 7–0. **Drive: 6 plays, 29 yards, 3:24.**

**Second quarter**

- PIT – Antonio Brown 7-yard pass from Ben Roethlisberger (Chris Boswell kick), 5:42. Tied 7–7. **Drive: 13 plays, 77 yards, 7:11.**
- CHI – Adam Shaheen 2-yard pass from Mike Glennon (Connor Barth kick), 0:43. Bears 14–7. **Drive: 9 plays, 75 yards, 4:59.**
- CHI – Connor Barth 24-yard field goal, 0:00. Bears 17–7. **Drive: 1 play, −4 yards, 0:00.**

**Third quarter**

- PIT – Le'Veon Bell 1-yard run (Chris Boswell kick), 6:43. Bears 17–14. **Drive: 6 plays, 16 yards, 2:42.**

**Fourth quarter**

- PIT – Chris Boswell 32-yard field goal, 8:03. Tied 17–17. **Drive: 4 plays, 7 yards, 0:54.**

**Overtime**

- CHI – Jordan Howard 19-yard run, 8:27. Bears 23–17. **Drive: 4 plays, 74 yards, 1:33.**

**Top passers**

- PIT – Ben Roethlisberger – 22/39, 235 yards, 1 TD
- CHI – Mike Glennon – 15/22, 101 yards, 1 TD, 1 INT

**Top rushers**

- PIT – Le'Veon Bell – 15 rushes, 61 yards, 1 TD
- CHI – Jordan Howard – 23 rushes, 140 yards, 2 TD

**Top receivers**

- PIT – Antonio Brown – 10 receptions, 110 yards, 1 TD
- CHI – Jordan Howard – 5 receptions, 26 yards

**Top tacklers**

- PIT – Ryan Shazier – 11 total tackles, 11 solo
- CHI – Danny Trevathan – 10 total tackles, 8 solo

The Steelers traveled to Chicago to take on the Bears. In the first quarter, the Bears scored first when Jordan Howard ran for a 3-yard touchdown to take a 7–0 lead for the only score of the quarter. In the second quarter, the Steelers managed to tie it up at 7–7 when Ben Roethlisberger found Antonio Brown on a 7-yard pass. The Bears moved ahead by double digits later on when Mike Glennon found Adam Shaheen on a 2-yard pass to make it 14–7. This would be followed up by Connor Barth's 24-yard field goal to make it 17–7 at halftime. After the break, the Steelers got back to work and came within 3 as Le'Veon Bell ran for a 1-yard touchdown to make it 17–14. They would tie the game up in the fourth quarter when Chris Boswell nailed a 32-yard field goal. The Steelers then tried their hand at coming back for the win later on in the quarter, but Roethlisberger was sacked in Bears territory, sending the game into overtime. In overtime, the Bears got the ball. They would win it by way of Howard's 19-yard run for a touchdown and the final score 23–17.

With the loss and 9-game regular season winning streak snapped, the Steelers dropped to 2–1 and with the Ravens' loss to the Jaguars moved into a tie on top of the AFC North.

The loss was the Steelers' third straight against the Bears, and dropped the Steelers to a record of 1–12 all-time against the Bears in Chicago.

==== Week 4: at Baltimore Ravens ====
Week Four: Pittsburgh Steelers at Baltimore Ravens – Game summary

Quarter	1	2	3	4	Total
**Steelers**	3	16	0	7	**26**
Ravens	0	0	9	0	**9**

at M&T Bank Stadium, Baltimore, Maryland

- Date: October 1
- Game time: 1:00 pm. EDT
- Game weather: 64 °F (18 °C), sunny
- Game attendance: 71,126
- Referee: Walt Anderson
- TV announcers (CBS): Ian Eagle, Dan Fouts and Evan Washburn
- Recap, Gamebook

Game information

**First quarter**

- PIT – Chris Boswell 31-yard field goal, 0:22. Steelers 3–0. **Drive: 16 plays, 84 yards, 10:23.**

**Second quarter**

- PIT – Chris Boswell 49-yard field goal, 7:25. Steelers 6–0. **Drive: 9 plays, 15 yards, 2:59.**
- PIT – Le'Veon Bell 1-yard run (Chris Boswell kick), 3:24. Steelers 13–0. **Drive: 6 plays, 28 yards, 2:24.**
- PIT – JuJu Smith-Schuster 11-yard pass from Ben Roethlisberger (pass failed), 0:38. Steelers 19–0. **Drive: 8 plays, 70 yards, 1:35.**

**Third quarter**

- BAL – Justin Tucker 42-yard field goal, 12:32. Steelers 19–3. **Drive: 4 plays, −6 yards, 0:56.**
- BAL – Mike Wallace 16-yard pass from Joe Flacco (run failed), 6:02. Steelers 19–9. **Drive: 3 plays, 66 yards, 1:03.**

**Fourth quarter**

- PIT – Le'Veon Bell 1-yard run (Chris Boswell kick), 2:26. Steelers 26–9. **Drive: 7 plays, 49 yards, 3:11.**

**Top passers**

- PIT – Ben Roethlisberger – 18/30, 216 yards, 1 TD, 1 INT
- BAL – Joe Flacco – 31/49, 235 yards, 1 TD, 2 INT

**Top rushers**

- PIT – Le'Veon Bell – 35 rushes, 144 yards, 2 TD
- BAL – Alex Collins – 9 rushes, 82 yards

**Top receivers**

- PIT – Le'Veon Bell – 4 receptions, 42 yards
- BAL – Mike Wallace – 6 receptions, 55 yards, 1 TD

**Top tacklers**

- PIT – Ryan Shazier – 11 total tackles, 10 solo, 1 INT
- BAL – C. J. Mosley – 12 total tackles, 10 solo

After their first loss of the season, the Steelers traveled to Baltimore to play the Ravens. The Steelers forced a punt on the Ravens' first drive before the Steelers offense produced a 16-play, 84-yard drive which took up 10 minutes and 23 seconds of game time and led to a 30-yard Chris Boswell field goal, making the score 3–0. This would remain the score until Boswell added a 49-yard field goal in the second quarter, making the score 6–0. The Steelers finally reached the end zone on their next drive, as Le'Veon Bell scored from the 1-yard line to put the Steelers up 13–0. The Steelers scored again on their final offensive drive of the half as Ben Roethlisberger connected with JuJu Smith-Schuster for an 11-yard touchdown pass (and the Steelers failed their 2-point conversion attempt), putting the Steelers up 19–0 going into halftime. The Ravens' Justin Tucker missed a 62-yard field goal as time expired in the second quarter.

The Steelers received the ball to begin the second half, and Roethlisberger was intercepted by Eric Weddle, who was credited with the turnover after a coach's challenge by John Harbaugh. The play had initially been ruled a catch by Antonio Brown, but after review, the officials determined that Brown had never established possession of the ball, and because it had never touched the ground, the Ravens took over on the Steelers' 18-yard line. Baltimore capitalized by adding a Tucker 42-yard field goal, making the score 19–3 in favor of the Steelers. On the Steelers' next drive, Boswell missed a 44-yard field goal, and after taking over on downs, the Ravens took only three plays to score on a 16-yard touchdown from Joe Flacco to Mike Wallace. The Ravens attempted a 2-point conversion, but Terrance West (though initially ruled as successfully scoring) was stopped at the 1-yard line by the Steelers defense, making the score 19–9. In the fourth quarter, the Steelers defense intercepted Flacco twice, with the second interception leading to another 1-yard touchdown run by Bell, making the final score 26–9. The Steelers moved into sole possession of first place in the AFC North with the victory while the team improved to 3–1. The team would win their 6th straight game against a divisional opponent.

The victory marked the first time that the Steelers defeated the Ravens in Baltimore since 2012. It would also be Roethlisberger's first win in Baltimore since 2010. Pittsburgh also scored the most points in Baltimore of any Steelers team since 2002. Seventeen points marked the largest margin of victory for the Steelers in Baltimore in series history, and the largest such margin against any team in Baltimore since the Steelers defeated the Colts in Memorial Stadium by twenty-six points in the 1976 NFL Playoffs.

==== Week 5: vs. Jacksonville Jaguars ====
Week Five: Jacksonville Jaguars at Pittsburgh Steelers – Game summary

Quarter	1	2	3	4	Total
**Jaguars**	0	7	13	10	**30**
Steelers	3	3	3	0	**9**

at Heinz Field, Pittsburgh, Pennsylvania

- Date: October 8
- Game time: 1:00 pm. EDT
- Game weather: 73 °F (23 °C), cloudy
- Game attendance: 66,237
- Referee: John Parry
- TV announcers (CBS): Kevin Harlan and Rich Gannon
- Recap, Gamebook

Game information

**First quarter**

- PIT – Chris Boswell 29-yard field goal, 10:17. Steelers 3–0. **Drive: 7 plays, 72 yards, 3:06.**

**Second quarter**

- JAX – Leonard Fournette 2-yard run (Jason Myers kick), 12:19. Jaguars 7–3. **Drive: 8 plays, 47 yards, 4:05.**
- PIT – Chris Boswell 34-yard field goal, 0:03. Jaguars 7–6. **Drive: 6 plays, 45 yards, 0:38.**

**Third quarter**

- PIT – Chris Boswell 20-yard field goal, 8:54. Steelers 9–7. **Drive: 14 plays, 73 yards, 6:06.**
- JAX – Telvin Smith 28-yard interception return (kick failed), 6:38. Jaguars 13–9.
- JAX – Barry Church 52-yard interception return (Jason Myers kick), 3:59. Jaguars 20–9.

**Fourth quarter**

- JAX – Jason Myers 47-yard field goal, 6:43. Jaguars 23–9. **Drive: 13 plays, 75 yards, 7:15.**
- JAX – Leonard Fournette 90-yard run (Jason Myers kick), 1:47. Jaguars 30–9. **Drive: 3 plays, 98 yards, 1:29.**

**Top passers**

- JAX – Blake Bortles – 8/14, 95 yards, 1 INT
- PIT – Ben Roethlisberger – 33/55, 312 yards, 5 INT

**Top rushers**

- JAX – Leonard Fournette – 28 rushes, 181 yards, 2 TD
- PIT – Le'Veon Bell – 15 rushes, 47 yards

**Top receivers**

- JAX – Marqise Lee – 2 receptions, 49 yards
- PIT – Antonio Brown – 10 receptions, 157 yards

**Top tacklers**

- JAX – Aaron Colvin – 10 total tackles, 9 solo
- PIT – Javon Hargrave – 10 total tackles, 4 solo

After a huge road win, the Steelers returned home for a game against the Jaguars. In the first quarter the Steelers scored first as Chris Boswell kicked a 29-yard field goal for a 3–0 lead and the only score of the period. In the second quarter, the Jaguars got on the board when Leonard Fournette ran for a 2-yard touchdown to make it 7–3. The Steelers drew closer before halftime though as Boswell kicked a 34-yard field goal to make it 7–6. After the break, the Steelers would retake the lead in the third quarter when Boswell kicked a 20-yard field goal to make it 9–7. The Jaguars would score 23 unanswered points when Ben Roethlisberger was intercepted twice: Telvin Smith returned one 28 yards for a touchdown (with a failed PAT) as the Jags moved ahead 13–9. This would be followed up by a Barry Church interception that was returned 51 yards for a touchdown to make it 20–9 to finish the third quarter. In the fourth quarter, Jason Myers added a 47-yard field goal to make it 23–9. Later on, the Steelers' rush defense stalled as Fournette ran for a 90-yard touchdown to make the final score 30–9.

With the loss, the Steelers dropped to 3–2. The 21-point loss was the largest home loss in Mike Tomlin's career as the team's head coach. Ben Roethlisberger also set a new career high of five interceptions in a single game including two which were returned for touchdowns.

The team failed to score a touchdown at home for the first time since their 11–10 victory over the Chargers in 2008.

==== Week 6: at Kansas City Chiefs ====
Week Six: Pittsburgh Steelers at Kansas City Chiefs – Game summary

Quarter	1	2	3	4	Total
**Steelers**	2	10	0	7	**19**
Chiefs	3	0	0	10	**13**

at Arrowhead Stadium, Kansas City, Missouri

- Date: October 15
- Game time: 4:25 pm. EDT/3:25 pm. CDT
- Game weather: 60 °F (16 °C), sunny
- Game attendance: 76,994
- Referee: Carl Cheffers
- TV announcers (CBS): Jim Nantz, Tony Romo and Tracy Wolfson
- Recap, Gamebook

Game information

**First quarter**

- PIT – Zach Fulton fumble out of bounds in end zone for a Safety, 7:49. Steelers 2–0.
- KC – Harrison Butker 46-yard field goal, 6:20. Chiefs 3–2. **Drive: 4 plays, 4 yards, 1:29.**

**Second quarter**

- PIT – Le'Veon Bell 3-yard run (Chris Boswell kick), 14:55. Steelers 9–3. **Drive: 12 plays, 75 yards, 6:25.**
- PIT – Chris Boswell 24-yard field goal, 2:08. Steelers 12–3. **Drive: 12 plays, 93 yards, 6:43.**

**Third quarter**

- No scoring plays.

**Fourth quarter**

- KC – De'Anthony Thomas 57-yard pass from Alex Smith (Harrison Butker kick), 6:13. Steelers 12–10. **Drive: 8 plays, 82 yards, 2:50.**
- PIT – Antonio Brown 51-yard pass from Ben Roethlisberger (Chris Boswell kick), 3:24. Steelers 19–10. **Drive: 5 plays, 75 yards, 2:49.**
- KC – Harrison Butker 33-yard field goal, 2:17. Steelers 19–13. **Drive: 6 plays, 52 yards, 1:07.**

**Top passers**

- PIT – Ben Roethlisberger – 17/25, 252 yards, TD, INT
- KC – Alex Smith – 19/34, 246 yards, TD

**Top rushers**

- PIT – Le'Veon Bell – 32 carries, 179 yards, TD
- KC – Kareem Hunt – 9 carries, 21 yards

**Top receivers**

- PIT – Antonio Brown – 8 receptions, 155 yards, TD
- KC – Kareem Hunt – 5 receptions, 89 yards

**Top tacklers**

- PIT – Sean Davis – 6 Tackles, 2 Assisted
- KC – Daniel Sorensen – 4 Tackles, 4 Assisted

After being blown out at home, the Steelers traveled to Kansas City to face the undefeated Chiefs. The Steelers scored first in the first quarter when Zach Fulton fumbled the ball into the end zone for a safety giving them a 2–0 lead. The Chiefs took the lead later on in the quarter when Harrison Butker kicked a 46-yard field goal to make it 3–2. The Steelers moved back ahead in the second quarter when Le'Veon Bell ran for a 3-yard touchdown making the score 9–3. This would be followed up by Chris Boswell kicking a 24-yard field goal to put the team up 12–3 at halftime. After a scoreless third quarter, the Chiefs came within 2 as Alex Smith connected with De'Anthony Thomas on a 57-yard pass to make it 12–10 to start the fourth quarter. Later on, the Steelers would move ahead by 9 when Ben Roethlisberger found Antonio Brown on a 51-yard pass to make it 19–10. The Chiefs came within 6 when Butker nailed a 33-yard field goal to make it 19–13. The Chiefs later on failed to convert a fourth down, sealing the win for the Steelers.

With the win, the Steelers improved to 4–2. Roethlisberger's record against the Chiefs increased to 6–1.

==== Week 7: vs. Cincinnati Bengals ====
Week Seven: Cincinnati Bengals at Pittsburgh Steelers – Game summary

Quarter	1	2	3	4	Total
Bengals	7	7	0	0	**14**
**Steelers**	7	13	6	3	**29**

at Heinz Field, Pittsburgh, Pennsylvania

- Date: October 22
- Game time: 4:25 pm. EDT
- Game weather: 79 °F (26 °C), sunny
- Game attendance: 65,363
- Referee: Bill Vinovich
- TV announcers (CBS): Jim Nantz, Tony Romo and Tracy Wolfson
- Recap, Gamebook

Game information

**First quarter**

- PIT – Antonio Brown 7-yard pass from Ben Roethlisberger (Chris Boswell kick), 9:25. Steelers 7–0. **Drive: 9 plays, 75 yards, 5:35.**
- CIN – Brandon LaFell 6-yard pass from Andy Dalton (Randy Bullock kick), 0:10. Tied 7–7. **Drive: 8 plays, 53 yards, 3:34.**

**Second quarter**

- PIT – JuJu Smith-Schuster 31-yard pass from Ben Roethlisberger (Chris Boswell kick), 12:52. Steelers 14–7. **Drive: 5 plays, 75 yards, 2:18.**
- CIN – Tyler Kroft 1-yard pass from Andy Dalton (Randy Bullock kick), 7:12. Tied 14–14. **Drive: 12 plays, 75 yards, 5:40.**
- PIT – Chris Boswell 22-yard field goal, 1:50. Steelers 17–14. **Drive: 10 plays, 75 yards, 5:22.**
- PIT – Chris Boswell 24-yard field goal, 0:00. Steelers 20–14. **Drive: 7 plays, 71 yards, 1:28.**

**Third quarter**

- PIT – Chris Boswell 41-yard field goal, 7:23. Steelers 23–14. **Drive: 11 plays, 54 yards, 5:57.**
- PIT – Chris Boswell 49-yard field goal, 5:28. Steelers 26–14. **Drive: 4 plays, 9 yards, 1:20.**

**Fourth quarter**

- PIT – Chris Boswell 25-yard field goal, 5:14. Steelers 29–14. **Drive: 10 plays, 70 yards, 4:06.**

**Top passers**

- CIN – Andy Dalton – 17/30, 140 yards, 2 TD, 2 INT
- PIT – Ben Roethlisberger – 14/24, 224 yards, 2 TD

**Top rushers**

- CIN – Joe Mixon – 7 carries, 48 yards
- PIT – Le'Veon Bell – 35 carries, 134 yards

**Top receivers**

- CIN – Brandon LaFell – 4 receptions, 28 yards, TD
- PIT – Antonio Brown – 4 receptions, 65 yards, TD

**Top tacklers**

- CIN – Pat Sims and Vincent Rey 4 Solo,4 Assisted
- PIT – Ryan Shazier – 5 Solo, 3 Assisted

After a tough win on the road, the Steelers returned home for Game 1 against the division rival Bengals. The Steelers would score first when Ben Roethlisberger found Antonio Brown on a 7-yard pass to make it 7–0. Later on in the quarter, the Bengals would tie it up when Andy Dalton found Brandon LaFell on a 6-yard pass to make it a 7–7 game. In the second quarter, the Steelers moved back into the lead when Roethlisberger found JuJu Smith-Schuster on a 31-yard pass to make it 14–7. The Bengals tied it up again when Dalton found Tyler Kroft on a 1-yard pass making it 14–14. The Steelers closed the half with 2 field goals kicked by Chris Boswell: From 22 and 24 yards out to retake the lead 17–14 and then make it 20–14 at halftime. In the highly defensive second half, the Steelers managed to score more field goals starting in the third quarter when Boswell went for 2 more, from 41 and 49 yards out, to increase the Steelers' lead from 9 to 12 and making the score change from 23–14 to 26–14. In the last quarter, the Steelers would seal the game when Boswell hit his fifth field goal of the game from 29 yards out to make the final score 29–14.

With the win, the Steelers improved to 5–2. The team also picked up their 7th straight win against a divisional opponent and picked up their fifth straight win over the Bengals.

==== Week 8: at Detroit Lions ====
Week Eight: Pittsburgh Steelers at Detroit Lions – Game summary

Quarter	1	2	3	4	Total
**Steelers**	3	7	10	0	**20**
Lions	3	9	0	3	**15**

at Ford Field, Detroit, Michigan

- Date: October 29
- Game time: 8:30 pm. EDT
- Game weather: Played indoors (dome stadium)
- Game attendance: 64,983
- Referee: John Hussey
- TV announcers (NBC): Al Michaels, Cris Collinsworth and Michele Tafoya
- Recap, Gamebook

Game information

**First quarter**

- PIT – Chris Boswell 34-yard field goal. Steelers 3–0. **Drive: 7 plays, 59 yards, 2:48.**
- DET – Matt Prater 48-yard field goal. Tied 3–3. **Drive: 8 plays, 45 yards, 4:22.**

**Second quarter**

- DET – Matt Prater 37-yard field goal. Lions 6–3. **Drive: 8 plays, 39 yards, 3:33.**
- PIT – Le'Veon Bell 5-yard run (Chris Boswell kick). Steelers 10–6. **Drive: 9 plays, 75 yards, 5:01.**
- DET – Matt Prater 51-yard field goal. Steelers 10–9. **Drive: 6 plays, 42 yards, 1:56.**
- DET – Matt Prater 34-yard field goal. Lions 12–10. **Drive: 8 plays, 63 yards, 0:43.**

**Third quarter**

- PIT – Chris Boswell 38-yard field goal. Steelers 13–12. **Drive: 9 plays, 28 yards, 4:08.**
- PIT – JuJu Smith-Schuster 97-yard pass from Ben Roethlisberger (Chris Boswell kick). Steelers 20–12. **Drive: 3 plays, 98 yards, 1:24.**

**Fourth quarter**

- DET – Matt Prater 19-yard field goal. Steelers 20–15. **Drive: 10 plays, 74 yards, 5:07.**

**Top passers**

- PIT – Ben Roethlisberger – 17/31, 317 yards, TD, INT
- DET – Matthew Stafford – 27/45, 423 yards

**Top rushers**

- PIT – Le'Veon Bell – 25 carries, 76 yards, TD
- DET – Ameer Abdullah – 11 carries, 27 yards

**Top receivers**

- PIT – JuJu Smith-Schuster – 7 receptions, 193 yards, TD
- DET – Marvin Jones Jr. – 6 receptions, 128 yards

**Top tacklers**

- PIT – Artie Burns – 8 Solo, 1 assist
- DET – Tavon Wilson – 7 Solo, 4 Assisted

After winning at home, the Steelers traveled to Detroit to take on the Lions. The Steelers would score first when Chris Boswell nailed a 34-yard field goal to make the score 3–0. The Lions tied the game up later on when Matt Prater kicked a 48-yard field goal to make it 3–3. The Lions moved into the lead when Prater kicked a 37-yard field goal to make it 6–3. The Steelers moved back into the lead when Le'Veon Bell ran for a 5-yard touchdown to make it 10–6. The Lions retook the lead when Prater kicked 2 more field goals from 51 and 34 yards out to make the score 10–9 and then move up 12–10 at halftime. In the third quarter, it was all Steelers as they retook the lead when Chris Boswell kicked a 38-yard field goal to make it 13–12. Later on in the quarter, Ben Roethlisberger connected with JuJu Smith-Schuster for a 97-yard pass making it 20–12. The Lions scored their only points of the second half in the fourth quarter when Prater kicked a 19-yard field goal to make it 20–15. This would eventually be the final score of the game.

With the win, the Steelers went into their bye week 6–2.

After falling behind in the all-time series to the Lions 4–12–1 through 1965, the Steelers' victory moved them to 13–2 against Detroit since 1966.

The team also held an opponent without a touchdown on the road for the first time since their 28–12 victory over the Browns in 2015.

==== Week 10: at Indianapolis Colts ====
Week Ten: Pittsburgh Steelers at Indianapolis Colts – Game summary

Quarter	1	2	3	4	Total
**Steelers**	0	3	6	11	**20**
Colts	0	10	7	0	**17**

at Lucas Oil Stadium, Indianapolis, Indiana

- Date: November 12
- Game time: 1:00 pm. EST
- Game weather: Played indoor (retractable roof closed)
- Game attendance: 66,146
- Referee: Clete Blakeman
- TV announcers (CBS): Greg Gumbel, Trent Green and Jamie Erdahl
- Recap, Gamebook

Game information

**First quarter**

- No scoring plays.

**Second quarter**

- IND – Donte Moncrief 60-yard pass from Jacoby Brissett (Adam Vinatieri kick), 14:52. Colts 7–0. **Drive: 4 plays, 68 yards, 1:21.**
- IND – Adam Vinatieri 48-yard field goal, 5:51. Colts 10–0. **Drive: 13 plays, 63 yards, 7:13.**
- PIT – Chris Boswell 41-yard field goal, 0:30. Colts 10–3. **Drive: 8 plays, 39 yards, 1:09.**

**Third quarter**

- IND – Chester Rogers 61-yard pass from Jacoby Brissett (Adam Vinatieri kick), 12:46. Colts 17–3. **Drive: 4 plays, 75 yards, 2:14.**
- PIT – JuJu Smith-Schuster 7-yard pass from Ben Roethlisberger (kick blocked), 7:47. Colts 17–9. **Drive: 8 plays, 78 yards, 4:59.**

**Fourth quarter**

- PIT – Vance McDonald 7-yard pass from Ben Roethlisberger (Ben Roethlisberger-Martavis Bryant pass), 11:52. Tied 17–17. **Drive: 3 plays, 10 yards, 1:00.**
- PIT – Chris Boswell 33-yard field goal, 0:00. Steelers 20–17. **Drive: 10 plays, 70 yards, 3:10.**

**Top passers**

- PIT – Ben Roethlisberger – 19/31, 236 yards, 2 TD, INT
- IND – Jacoby Brissett – 14/24, 222 yards, 2 TD, INT

**Top rushers**

- PIT – Le'Veon Bell – 26 carries, 80 yards
- IND – Frank Gore – 17 carries, 54 yards

**Top receivers**

- PIT – JuJu Smith-Schuster – 5 receptions, 97 yards, TD
- IND – Chester Rogers – 6 receptions, 104 yards, TD

**Top tacklers**

- PIT – Sean Davis – 6 Solo, 1 Assisted
- IND – Antonio Morrison – 5 Solo, 4 Assisted

Coming back from their bye week, the Steelers traveled to Indianapolis to take on the Colts. Neither team scored in the first quarter. But in the second, the Colts grabbed an early lead when Jacoby Brissett found Donte Moncrief on a 60-yard pass to make it 7–0. Adam Vinatieri tacked on a 48-yard field goal to make it 10–0. The Steelers got on the board later on in the quarter when Chris Boswell kicked a 41-yard field goal to make the halftime score 10–3. In the third quarter, the Colts went back to work when Brissett found Chester Rogers on a 61-yard pass to make the score 17–3. Though the Steelers would score a touchdown when Ben Roethlisberger found JuJu Smith-Schuster on a 7-yard pass (with a failed PAT) to make it 17–9. Getting the ball back deep in Colts territory after a Ryan Shazier interception, the Steelers managed to tie the game up in the fourth quarter when Roethlisberger found Vance McDonald on a 7-yard pass (with a successful 2-point conversion) to make it 17–17. The defense would hold the Colts off in the last quarter. The Steelers got the ball back and were able to complete the game-winning drive when Boswell sealed the game with a 33-yard field goal to make the final score 20–17.

With the win, the Steelers improved to 7–2.

==== Week 11: vs. Tennessee Titans ====
Week Eleven: Tennessee Titans at Pittsburgh Steelers – Game summary

Quarter	1	2	3	4	Total
Titans	7	0	10	0	**17**
**Steelers**	10	6	7	17	**40**

at Heinz Field, Pittsburgh, Pennsylvania

- Date: November 16
- Game time: 8:25 pm. EST
- Game weather: 40 °F (4 °C), cloudy
- Game attendance: 60,703
- Referee: Ronald Torbert
- TV announcers (NBC/NFLN/Amazon Video): Mike Tirico, Cris Collinsworth and Heather Cox
- Recap, Gamebook

Game information

**First quarter**

- PIT – Antonio Brown 41-yard pass from Ben Roethlisberger (Chris Boswell kick), 12:33. Steelers 7–0. **Drive: 6 plays, 75 yards, 2:35.**
- PIT – Chris Boswell 41-yard field goal, 9:45. Steelers 10–0. **Drive: 5 plays, 1 yard, 1:46.**
- TEN – Marcus Mariota 7-yard run (Ryan Succop kick), 3:11. Steelers 10–7. **Drive: 11 plays, 68 yards, 6:36.**

**Second quarter**

- PIT – Chris Boswell 28-yard field goal, 1:39. Steelers 13–7. **Drive: 7 plays, 10 yards, 1:34.**
- PIT – Chris Boswell 50-yard field goal, 0:23. Steelers 16–7. **Drive: 7 plays, 35 yards, 0:53.**

**Third quarter**

- TEN – Rishard Matthews 75-yard pass from Marcus Mariota (Ryan Succop kick), 15:00. Steelers 16–14. **Drive: 1 play, 75 yards, 0:11.**
- PIT – Antonio Brown 5-yard pass from Ben Roethlisberger (Chris Boswell kick), 10:05. Steelers 23–14. **Drive: 10 plays, 75 yards, 4:48.**
- TEN – Ryan Succop 44-yard field goal, 5:38. Steelers 23–17. **Drive: 8 plays, 49 yards, 4:27.**

**Fourth quarter**

- PIT – Jesse James 1-yard pass from Ben Roethlisberger (Chris Boswell kick), 15:00. Steelers 30–17. **Drive: 12 plays, 75 yards, 5:38.**
- PIT – Antonio Brown 10-yard pass from Ben Roethlisberger (Chris Boswell kick), 12:18. Steelers 37–17. **Drive: 3 plays, 51 yards, 1:27.**
- PIT – Chris Boswell 26-yard field goal, 5:24. Steelers 40–17. **Drive: 10 plays, 44 yards, 6:18.**

**Top passers**

- TEN – Marcus Mariota – 22/33, 306 yards, TD, 4 INT
- PIT – Ben Roethlisberger – 30/45, 299 yards, 4 TD

**Top rushers**

- TEN – Derrick Henry – 7 rushes, 32 yards
- PIT – Le'Veon Bell – 12 rushes, 46 yards

**Top receivers**

- TEN – Rishard Matthews – 5 receptions, 113 yards, TD
- PIT – Antonio Brown – 10 receptions, 144 yards, 3 TD

**Top tacklers**

- TEN – Adoree’ Jackson – 11 Solo
- PIT – Ryan Shazier – 5 Solo, 5 Assisted

The Steelers went back home for a Thursday Night duel against the Titans. In the first quarter, the Steelers scored first when Ben Roethlisberger found Antonio Brown on a 41-yard pass to make it 7–0. They would make it 10–0 after Chris Boswell nailed a 41-yard field goal. The Titans got on the board later on in the quarter when Marcus Mariota ran for a 7-yard touchdown, making it 10–7. In the second quarter the Steelers pulled away as Boswell kicked 2 more field goals from 28 and 50 yards to make the score 13–7 and then 16–7 at halftime. In the third quarter, the Titans came within 2 when Mariota found Rishard Matthews on a 75-yard pass, making it 16–14. The Steelers would pull away again as Roethlisberger and Brown connected on a 5-yard pass, making the score 23–14. The Titans came within 6 later on when Ryan Succop kicked a 44-yard field goal to make it 23–17. In the fourth quarter, it was all Steelers as they sealed the game when Roethlisberger found Jesse James on a 1-yard pass to make it 30–17. This would be followed by Roethlisberger and Brown connecting on a 10-yard pass to make it 37–17. Boswell then finished with a 26-yard field goal to make the final score 40–17.

With the win, the Steelers improved to 8–2, and enjoyed the best 10-game start of Mike Tomlin's career, and the best 10-game start for the Steelers since 2004 when they began 9–1.

The victory marked the first time since 1984 that the Steelers defense forced at least 4 turnovers and 5 sacks in the same game. Their plus-4 turnover ratio was the first time this was accomplished by the Steelers since November 24, 2013 against the Cleveland Browns.

==== Week 12: vs. Green Bay Packers ====
Week Twelve: Green Bay Packers at Pittsburgh Steelers – Game summary

Quarter	1	2	3	4	Total
Packers	14	0	7	7	**28**
**Steelers**	6	8	7	10	**31**

at Heinz Field, Pittsburgh, Pennsylvania

- Date: November 26
- Game time: 8:30 pm. EST
- Game weather: 38 °F (3 °C), clear
- Game attendance: 62,147
- Referee: Ed Hochuli
- TV announcers (NBC): Al Michaels, Cris Collinsworth and Michele Tafoya
- Recap, Gamebook

Game information

First quarter

- PIT – Xavier Grimble 1-yard pass from Ben Roethlisberger, 8:19. Steelers 6–0. **Drive: 12 plays, 59 yards, 6:46.**
- GB – Randall Cobb 39-yard pass from Brett Hundley (Mason Crosby kick), 4:53. Packers 7–6. **Drive: 6 plays, 60 yards, 3:29.**
- GB – Jamaal Williams 54-yard pass from Brett Hundley (Mason Crosby kick), 1:33. Packers 14–6. **Drive: 3 plays, 55 yards, 0:50.**

Second quarter

- PIT – Martavis Bryant 17-yard pass from Ben Roethlisberger, (Two-point conversion, Antonio Brown pass from Ben Roethlisberger), 7:26. Tied 14–14. **Drive: 5 plays, 65 yards, 2:51.**

Third quarter

- GB – Davante Adams 55-yard pass from Brett Hundley (Mason Crosby kick), 12:17. Packers 21–14. **Drive: 6 plays, 76 yards, 2:54.**
- PIT – Antonio Brown 1-yard pass from Ben Roethlisberger (Chris Boswell kick), 0:54. Tied 21–21. **Drive: 6 plays, 53 yards, 3:25.**

Fourth quarter

- PIT – Antonio Brown 33-yard pass from Ben Roethlisberger (Chris Boswell kick), 8:50. Steelers 28–21. **Drive: 7 plays, 68 yards, 4:14.**
- GB – Jamaal Williams 4-yard run (Mason Crosby kick), 2:08. Tied 28–28. **Drive: 12 plays, 77 yards, 6:40.**
- PIT – Chris Boswell 53-yard field goal, 0:04. Steelers 31–28. **Drive: 4 plays, 35 yards, 0:17.**
- GB – Brett Hundley – 17/26, 245 yards, 3 TD
- PIT – Ben Roethlisberger – 33/45, 351 yards, 4 TD, 2 INT

Top rushers

- GB – Jamaal Williams – 21 rushes, 66 yards, TD
- PIT – Le'Veon Bell – 20 rushes, 95 yards

Top receivers

- GB – Davante Adams – 5 receptions, 82 yards, TD
- PIT – Antonio Brown – 10 receptions, 169 yards, 2 TD

After a huge win, the Steelers stayed home for a game against the Packers. They would score first in the first quarter when Ben Roethlisberger found Xavier Grimble on a 1-yard pass (with a failed PAT) to make it 6–0. The Packers scored 2 touchdowns to close out the first half. The first one followed an interception thrown by Roethlisberger when QB Brett Hundley found Randall Cobb on a 39-yard pass to make it 7–6. The Steelers' defense also stalled later on in the quarter when Hundley found Jamaal Williams on a 54-yard pass to make it 14–6 in favor of the Packers. In the second quarter, the Steelers managed to tie the game when Roethlisberger found Martavis Bryant on a 17-yard pass (with a successful 2-point conversion) to make the score 14–14 at halftime. In the third quarter, the Packers retook the lead when Hundley found Davante Adams on a 55-yard pass to make it 21–14. Later on, the Steelers tied it back up when Roethlisberger found Antonio Brown on a 1-yard pass to make it 21–21. The Steelers managed to take the lead when Roethlisberger and Brown hooked up again this time on a 33-yard pass to make it 28–21. The Packers would tie it up later on in the quarter when Williams ran for a 4-yard touchdown to make it 28–28. With seconds left, Chris Boswell would put up the game-winning 53-yard field goal to make the final score 31–28.

With their sixth straight win, the Steelers improved to 9–2.

The game marked the Steelers' first victory while suffering a negative-3 turnover ratio since defeating the Cincinnati Bengals on December 2, 2007. It was also the Steelers' fifth consecutive regular season win over the Packers, as well as their fifth consecutive win over the Packers in Pittsburgh.

The Steelers' 462 yards of offense represented their most since December 6, 2015 against the Indianapolis Colts.

==== Week 13: at Cincinnati Bengals ====
Week Thirteen: Pittsburgh Steelers at Cincinnati Bengals – Game summary

Quarter	1	2	3	4	Total
**Steelers**	0	3	7	13	**23**
Bengals	10	7	3	0	**20**

at Paul Brown Stadium, Cincinnati, Ohio

- Date: December 4
- Game time: 8:30 pm. EST
- Game weather: 61 °F (16 °C), cloudy, chance of rain
- Game attendance: 56,029
- Referee: Walt Anderson
- TV announcers (ESPN): Sean McDonough, Jon Gruden and Lisa Salters
- Recap, Gamebook

Game information

**First quarter**

- CIN – Randy Bullock 35-yard field goal, 10:53. Bengals 3–0. **Drive: 5 plays, 27 yards, 2:04.**
- CIN – A. J. Green 8-yard pass from Andy Dalton (Randy Bullock kick), 0:45. Bengals 10–0. **Drive: 12 plays, 85 yards, 6:34.**

**Second quarter**

- CIN – A. J. Green 15-yard pass from Andy Dalton (Randy Bullock kick), 0:35. Bengals 17–0. **Drive: 15 plays, 78 yards, 6:13.**
- PIT – Chris Boswell 30-yard field goal, 0:05. Bengals 17–3. **Drive: 3 plays, 71 yards, 0:31.**

**Third quarter**

- PIT – Le'Veon Bell 35-yard pass from Ben Roethlisberger (Chris Boswell kick), 9:09. Bengals 17–10. **Drive: 9 plays, 78 yards, 4:58.**
- CIN – Randy Bullock 41-yard field goal, 3:38. Bengals 20–10. **Drive: 10 plays, 52 yards, 5:25.**

**Fourth quarter**

- PIT – Chris Boswell 37-yard field goal, 10:11. Bengals 20–13. **Drive: 11 plays, 74 yards, 4:29.**
- PIT – Antonio Brown 6-yard pass from Ben Roethlisberger (Chris Boswell kick), 3:55. Tied 20–20. **Drive: 9 plays, 80 yards, 4:10.**
- PIT – Chris Boswell 38-yard field goal, 0:04. Steelers 23–20. **Drive: 8 plays, 39 yards, 2:42.**

**Top passers**

- PIT – Ben Roethlisberger – 24/40, 290 yards, 2 TD, INT
- CIN – Andy Dalton – 21/36, 234 yards, 2 TD

**Top rushers**

- PIT – Le'Veon Bell – 18 rushes, 76 yards
- CIN – Giovani Bernard – 13 rushes, 77 yards

**Top receivers**

- PIT – Le'Veon Bell – 5 receptions, 106 yards, TD
- CIN – A. J. Green – 7 receptions, 77 yards, 2 TD

**Top tacklers**

- PIT – Vince Williams – 4 Solo, 5 Assisted
- CIN – Dre Kirkpatrick – 7 Solo

After winning in a close game at home, the Steelers traveled to Cincinnati for Game 2 against the Bengals. On a 2nd and 5 early in the game, Steelers linebacker Ryan Shazier suffered a career-ending spinal cord injury while tackling Bengals wide receiver Josh Malone. Shazier was paralyzed from the waist down but later regained the ability to walk and run. The Bengals scored first in the first quarter when Randy Bullock kicked a 35-yard field goal to make it 3–0. They would then make it 10–0 when Andy Dalton found A.J. Green on an 8-yard pass. In the second quarter, Dalton and Green connected again on a 15-yard pass to make it 17–0. The Steelers managed to get on the board before halftime when Chris Boswell put a 30-yard field goal through to make the score 17–3. In the third quarter, the Steelers drew closer when Ben Roethlisberger found Le'Veon Bell on a 35-yard touchdown to make it 17–10. The Bengals moved back ahead by double digits when Randy Bullock kicked a 31-yard field goal to make it 20–10. In the fourth quarter, it was all Steelers when Boswell put up a 37-yard field goal to make it 20–13. Roethlisberger then found Antonio Brown on a 6-yard pass to tie the game up at 20–20. Finally, Boswell was able to seal the victory with a 38-yard field goal to make the final score 23–20.

With their sixth straight win over the Bengals, the Steelers improved to 10–2. The victory marks the third time that the Steelers have recorded two different 7+ win streaks within consecutive and separate regular seasons (1975–76, 1994–95).

The team also won their 8th straight game against a divisional opponent. With the win, the Steelers began 4–0 in their division for the first time since 2008.

The 17-point comeback was the Steelers' largest since they came back from down 17 on December 20, 2015, against the Denver Broncos, and their largest on the road since their 21-point comeback on October 5, 1997, against the Baltimore Ravens.

==== Week 14: vs. Baltimore Ravens ====
Week Fourteen: Baltimore Ravens at Pittsburgh Steelers – Game summary

Quarter	1	2	3	4	Total
Ravens	0	14	17	7	**38**
**Steelers**	7	13	0	19	**39**

at Heinz Field, Pittsburgh, Pennsylvania

- Date: December 10
- Game time: 8:30 pm. EST
- Game weather: 33 °F (1 °C), cloudy
- Game attendance: 60,069
- Referee: Walt Coleman
- TV announcers (NBC): Al Michaels, Cris Collinsworth and Michele Tafoya
- Recap, Gamebook

Game information

**First quarter**

- PIT – Le'Veon Bell 20-yard pass from Ben Roethlisberger (Chris Boswell kick), 7:05. Steelers 7–0. **Drive: 8 plays, 59 yards, 3:25.**

**Second quarter**

- PIT – Le'Veon Bell 1-yard run (Chris Boswell kick), 13:16. Steelers 14–0. **Drive: 12 plays, 90 yards, 6:10.**
- BAL – Chris Moore 30-yard pass from Joe Flacco (Justin Tucker kick), 9:14. Steelers 14–7. **Drive: 9 plays, 78 yards, 4:04.**
- PIT – Chris Boswell 52-yard field goal, 4:18. Steelers 17–7. **Drive: 9 plays, 54 yards, 4:53.**
- BAL – Alex Collins 18-yard run (Justin Tucker kick), 2:00. Steelers 17–14. **Drive: 5 plays, 85 yards, 2:21.**
- PIT – Chris Boswell 43-yard field goal, 0:06. Steelers 20–14. **Drive: 11 plays, 50 yards, 1:52.**

**Third quarter**

- BAL – Justin Tucker 47-yard field goal, 10:10. Steelers 20–17. **Drive: 6 plays, 46 yards, 2:07.**
- BAL – Javorius Allen 1-yard run (Justin Tucker kick), 5:23. Ravens 24–20. **Drive: 7 plays, 60 yards, 3:06.**
- BAL – Patrick Ricard 6-yard pass from Joe Flacco (Justin Tucker kick), 2:48. Ravens 31–20. **Drive: 3 plays, 74 yards, 1:13.**

**Fourth quarter**

- PIT – Chris Boswell 24-yard field goal, 12:17. Ravens 31–23. **Drive: 15 plays, 80 yards, 5:27.**
- PIT – Roosevelt Nix 1-yard pass from Ben Roethlisberger (run failed), 9:21. Ravens 31–29. **Drive: 5 plays, 67 yards, 1:14.**
- BAL – Javorius Allen 9-yard run (Justin Tucker kick), 6:52. Ravens 38–29. **Drive: 6 plays, 56 yards, 2:31.**
- PIT – Le'Veon Bell 11-yard run (Chris Boswell kick), 3:36. Ravens 38–36. **Drive: 8 plays, 68 yards, 3:15.**
- PIT – Chris Boswell 46-yard field goal, 0:46. Steelers 39–38. **Drive: 10 plays, 55 yards, 1:43.**

**Top passers**

- BAL – Joe Flacco – 20/35, 269 yards, 2 TD, INT
- PIT – Ben Roethlisberger – 44/66, 506 yards, 2 TD

**Top rushers**

- BAL – Alex Collins – 18 rushes, 120 yards, TD
- PIT – Le'Veon Bell – 13 rushes, 48 yards, 2 TD

**Top receivers**

- BAL – Mike Wallace – 3 receptions, 72 yards
- PIT – Antonio Brown – 11 receptions, 213 yards

**Top tacklers**

- BAL – C. J. Mosley – 9 Solo, 5 Assisted
- PIT – Sean Davis – 8 Solo, 4 Assisted

After a tough win on the road, the Steelers went back home for their second game of the season against the Ravens. Pittsburgh scored first in the first quarter when Ben Roethlisberger found Le'Veon Bell for a 20-yard pass to make it 7–0 and the only score of the period. In the second quarter, the Steelers moved up 14–0 when Bell ran for a 1-yard touchdown. The Ravens got on the board when Joe Flacco found Chris Moore on a 30-yard pass to make it 14–7. The Steelers then moved ahead by double digits again when Chris Boswell put up a 52-yard field goal to make it 17–7. The Ravens then came within 3 when Alex Collins ran for an 18-yard touchdown to make the score 17–14. The Steelers closed out the half with another field goal kicked by Boswell from 43 yards out to make it 20–14 at halftime. In the third quarter, it was all Ravens when they took the lead after scoring 3 times: First when Justin Tucker managed to nail a 47-yard field goal to make it 20–17. This would be followed by Javorius Allen's 1-yard touchdown run as they took the lead 24–20. Flacco then found Patrick Ricard on a 6-yard pass as the Ravens moved up by double digits 31–20. In the fourth quarter, the Steelers managed to come within 2, starting with a 24-yard field goal kicked by Boswell shortening the Ravens' lead to 31–23. This would then be followed up by Roethlisberger connecting with Roosevelt Nix on a 1-yard pass (with a failed 2-point conversion) to make it 31–29. The Ravens managed to pull away when Allen ran for a 9-yard touchdown to make it 38–29. The Steelers then completed the comeback when Bell ran for an 11-yard touchdown to make it 38–36. This would be followed by Boswell kicking a 46-yard field goal to make it 39–38. The Ravens then got the ball back, but Flacco was sacked by T. J. Watt as time expired, sealing the win for the Steelers.

With the win, the Steelers improved to 11–2 and were awarded the AFC North division title. The team also managed to win their 9th straight game over a divisional opponent. They would win 8 in a row during a single season for the first time since 2004.

Pittsburgh notched their first 3-game win streak over the Ravens since defeating them three times during the 2008 season (including the playoffs). The teams' 77 combined points marked the most in series history. The team also swept the Ravens for the first time since 2008. With the division clinched, the team would win consecutive titles for the first time since the 2007 and 2008 seasons.

The Steelers' second consecutive 11+ point comeback victory marked the first time the Steelers had accomplished this feat since coming back from down 14 against the Denver Broncos on December 7, 1997, and then again from down 14 against the New England Patriots on December 13, 1997.

==== Week 15: vs. New England Patriots ====
Week Fifteen: New England Patriots at Pittsburgh Steelers – Game summary

Quarter	1	2	3	4	Total
**Patriots**	7	3	6	11	**27**
Steelers	7	10	7	0	**24**

at Heinz Field, Pittsburgh, Pennsylvania

- Date: December 17
- Game time: 4:25 pm. EST
- Game weather: 42 °F (6 °C), mostly cloudy
- Game attendance: 68,574
- Referee: Tony Corrente
- TV announcers (CBS): Jim Nantz, Tony Romo and Tracy Wolfson
- Recap, Gamebook

Game information

**First quarter**

- NE – Rex Burkhead 1-yard run (Stephen Gostkowski kick), 9:00. Patriots 7–0. **Drive: 6 plays, 77 yards, 3:11.**
- PIT – Eli Rogers 18-yard pass from Ben Roethlisberger (Chris Boswell kick), 5:32. Tied 7–7. **Drive: 8 plays, 69 yards, 3:28.**

**Second quarter**

- PIT – Chris Boswell 51-yard field goal, 12:15. Steelers 10–7. **Drive: 9 plays, 43 yards, 4:57.**
- NE – Stephen Gostkowski 32-yard field goal, 9:04. Tied 10–10. **Drive: 9 plays, 61 yards, 3:11.**
- PIT – Martavis Bryant 4-yard pass from Ben Roethlisberger (Chris Boswell kick), 0:25. Steelers 17–10. **Drive: 15 plays, 78 yards, 8:39.**

**Third quarter**

- NE – Brandin Cooks 4-yard pass from Tom Brady (kick failed), 8:50. Steelers 17–16. **Drive: 12 plays, 75 yards, 6:10.**
- PIT – Le'Veon Bell 3-yard run (Chris Boswell kick), 1:33. Steelers 24–16. **Drive: 5 plays, 22 yards, 2:58.**

**Fourth quarter**

- NE – Stephen Gostkowski 46-yard field goal, 3:56. Steelers 24–19. **Drive: 9 plays, 44 yards, 3:42.**
- NE – Dion Lewis 8-yard run (Tom Brady-Rob Gronkowski pass), 0:56. Patriots 27–24. **Drive: 5 plays, 77 yards, 1:10.**

**Top passers**

- NE – Tom Brady – 22/35, 298 yards, TD, INT
- PIT – Ben Roethlisberger – 22/30, 281 yards, 2 TD, INT

**Top rushers**

- NE – Dion Lewis – 13 rushes, 67 yards, TD
- PIT – Le'Veon Bell – 24 rushes, 117 yards, TD

**Top receivers**

- NE – Rob Gronkowski – 9 receptions, 168 yards
- PIT – JuJu Smith-Schuster – 6 receptions, 114 yards

**Top tacklers**

- NE – Stephon Gilmore – 8 Solo
- PIT – Sean Davis – 7 Solo, 3 Assisted

After another close win, the Steelers stayed home for a game against the Patriots. The Pats scored first in the first quarter when Rex Burkhead ran for a 1-yard touchdown to make it 7–0. The Steelers tied the game up later on when Ben Roethlisberger found Eli Rogers on an 18-yard pass to make it 7–7. In the second quarter, the Steelers took the lead when Chris Boswell kicked a 51-yard field goal to make it 10–7. The Pats would tie it up again when Stephen Gostkowski kicked a 32-yard field goal to make it 10–10. The Steelers then moved ahead when Roethlisberger found Martavis Bryant on a 4-yard pass to make it 17–10 at halftime. In the third quarter, the Pats drew closer when Tom Brady found Brandin Cooks on a 4-yard pass to make it 17–16 (with a failed PAT). The Steelers then moved further ahead when Le'Veon Bell ran for a 3-yard touchdown to make it 24–16 following a Brady interception. In the fourth quarter, Gostkowski's 46-yard field goal made it 24–19. Dion Lewis then ran for an 8-yard touchdown (with a successful 2-point conversion) to make it 27–24. The Steelers managed to make it deep into Patriots territory on the ensuing drive. However, an apparent touchdown pass to tight end Jesse James was controversially overturned after replay, and Roethlisberger was intercepted two plays later, sealing the win for the Pats.

With their 8-game winning streak snapped, the Steelers fell to 11–3. This loss not only prevented the Steelers from clinching the #1 seed but also conceded control of the #1 seed to the Patriots with the head-to-head tiebreaker.

==== Week 16: at Houston Texans ====
NFL on Christmas Day

Week Sixteen: Pittsburgh Steelers at Houston Texans – Game summary

Quarter	1	2	3	4	Total
**Steelers**	10	10	7	7	**34**
Texans	0	0	0	6	**6**

at NRG Stadium, Houston, Texas

- Date: December 25
- Game time: 4:30 pm. EST/3:30 pm. CST
- Game weather: Played indoors (retractable roof closed)
- Game attendance: 71,842
- Referee: Bill Vinovich
- TV announcers (NBC/NFLN/Amazon Video): Mike Tirico, Kurt Warner and Heather Cox
- Recap, Gamebook

Game information

**First quarter**

- PIT – Chris Boswell 34-yard field goal, 10:40. Steelers 3–0. **Drive: 8 plays, 59 yards, 4:20.**
- PIT – Justin Hunter 5-yard pass from Ben Roethlisberger (Chris Boswell kick), 6:59. Steelers 10–0. **Drive: 6 plays, 54 yards, 2:04.**

**Second quarter**

- PIT – Roosevelt Nix 1-yard run (Chris Boswell kick), 4:14. Steelers 17–0. **Drive: 11 plays, 80 yards, 6:07.**
- PIT – Chris Boswell 36-yard field goal, 0:53. Steelers 20–0. **Drive: 6 plays, 10 yards, 1:52.**

**Third quarter**

- PIT – Le'Veon Bell 10-yard run (Chris Boswell kick), 1:48. Steelers 27–0. **Drive: 7 plays, 42 yards, 3:55.**

**Fourth quarter**

- HOU – DeAndre Hopkins 3-yard pass from T. J. Yates (pass failed), 12:30. Steelers 27–6. **Drive: 7 plays, 75 yards, 4:18.**
- PIT – JuJu Smith-Schuster 18-yard pass from Ben Roethlisberger (Chris Boswell kick), 9:26. Steelers 34–6. **Drive: 5 plays, 79 yards, 3:04.**

**Top passers**

- PIT – Ben Roethlisberger – 20/29, 226 yards, 2 TD
- HOU – T. J. Yates – 7/16, 83 yards, TD, INT

**Top rushers**

- PIT – Le'Veon Bell – 14 carries, 69 yards, TD
- HOU – Alfred Blue – 16 carries, 108 yards

**Top receivers**

- PIT – JuJu Smith-Schuster – 6 receptions, 75 yards, TD
- HOU – DeAndre Hopkins – 4 receptions, 65 yards, TD

**Top tacklers**

- PIT – Sean Spence and Vince Williams – 6 Solo, 2 Assisted
- HOU – Zach Cunningham – 7 Solo, 3 Assisted

After a tough loss at home, the Steelers traveled to Houston to take on the Texans. In the first quarter, it was all Steelers when Chris Boswell kicked a 34-yard field goal to make it 3–0. They would then make it 10–0 when Ben Roethlisberger found Justin Hunter on a 5-yard pass. In the second quarter, the Steelers would increase their lead when Roosevelt Nix ran for a 1-yard touchdown followed up by Boswell kicking a 36-yard field goal to make it 17–0 and then 20–0 at halftime. In the third quarter, the Steelers continued their dominance when Le'Veon Bell ran for a 10-yard touchdown to make it 27–0. In the fourth quarter, the Texans finally got on the board when T. J. Yates found DeAndre Hopkins on a 3-yard pass (with a failed 2-point conversion) to make it 27–6. The Steelers were able to seal the game when Roethlisberger found JuJu Smith-Schuster on an 18-yard pass to make the final score 34–6.

With the win, the Steelers improved to 12–3, marking the tenth 12-win season in franchise history. With the Jaguars' loss to the 49ers on Sunday, the team was able to clinch a first-round bye in the AFC playoffs. The team also finished the regular season at 7–1 on the road for only the fourth time in franchise history (1978, 2004, 2010).

==== Week 17: vs. Cleveland Browns ====
Week Seventeen: Cleveland Browns at Pittsburgh Steelers – Game summary

Quarter	1	2	3	4	Total
Browns	0	14	10	0	**24**
**Steelers**	7	14	7	0	**28**

at Heinz Field, Pittsburgh, Pennsylvania

- Date: December 31
- Game time: 1:00 pm. EST
- Game weather: 11 °F (−12 °C), snow
- Game attendance: 50,704
- Referee: Jerome Boger
- TV announcers (CBS): Spero Dedes and Adam Archuleta
- Recap, Gamebook

Game information

**First quarter**

- PIT – Darrius Heyward-Bey 29-yard run (Chris Boswell kick), 10:52. Steelers 7–0. **Drive: 8 plays, 72 yards, 4:17.**

**Second quarter**

- PIT – JuJu Smith-Schuster 20-yard pass from Landry Jones (Chris Boswell kick), 13:32. Steelers 14–0. **Drive: 3 plays, 28 yards, 2:09.**
- CLE – Duke Johnson 2-yard run (Zane Gonzalez kick), 11:49. Steelers 14–7. **Drive: 5 plays, 74 yards, 1:40.**
- PIT – Stevan Ridley 4-yard run (Chris Boswell kick), 8:03. Steelers 21–7. **Drive: 8 plays, 75 yards, 3:47.**
- CLE – Rashard Higgins 56-yard pass from DeShone Kizer (Zane Gonzalez kick), 7:22. Steelers 21–14. **Drive: 2 plays, 60 yards, 0:46.**

**Third quarter**

- CLE – Rashard Higgins 5-yard pass from DeShone Kizer (Zane Gonzalez kick), 10:59. Tied 21–21. **Drive: 7 plays, 68 yards, 4:06.**
- PIT – JuJu Smith-Schuster 96-yard kickoff return (Chris Boswell kick), 10:54. Steelers 28–21.
- CLE – Zane Gonzalez 51-yard field goal, 2:09. Steelers 28–24. **Drive: 16 plays, 55 yards, 8:38.**

**Fourth quarter**

- No scoring plays.

**Top passers**

- CLE – DeShone Kizer – 16/30, 314 yards, 2 TD, INT
- PIT – Landry Jones – 23/27, 239 yards, TD, INT

**Top rushers**

- CLE – DeShone Kizer – 6 rushes, 61 yards
- PIT – Stevan Ridley – 17 rushes, 80 yards, TD

**Top receivers**

- CLE – Josh Gordon – 4 receptions, 115 yards
- PIT – JuJu Smith-Schuster – 9 receptions, 143 yards, TD

**Top tacklers**

- CLE – Joe Schobert – 9 Solo, 3 Assisted
- PIT – T. J. Watt and Tyson Alualu – 6 Solo, 2 Assisted each

After a huge win on the road, the Steelers returned home for their last regular season game against the 0–15 Browns. The Steelers would score first in the first quarter when Darrius Heyward-Bey ran for a 29-yard touchdown to make it 7–0. They would make it 14–0 in the second quarter when Landry Jones found JuJu Smith-Schuster on a 20-yard pass. The Browns managed to get on the board when Duke Johnson Jr. ran for a 2-yard touchdown to make it 14–7. The Steelers pulled away when Stevan Ridley ran for a 4-yard touchdown to make it 21–7. DeShone Kizer then found Rashard Higgins on a 56-yard pass to make the score 21–14 at halftime. In the third quarter, the Browns tied the game up when Kizer and Higgins connected again on a 5-yard pass to make it 21–21. The Steelers managed to pull away when Smith-Schuster returned the subsequent kick 96 yards for a touchdown to make it 28–21. The Browns then came within 4 when Zane Gonzalez put up a 51-yard field goal to make it 28–24. In a highly defensive and scoreless fourth quarter, this would be the final score of the game.

With the win, the Steelers finished their season at 13–3, marking their most wins since 2004, and tied for the third-most wins in team history. The team also won its 10th straight game over a divisional opponent. They also swept the division for the first time since 2008 and became the first AFC North team to sweep the division since the Ravens in 2011. The Steelers also ended the chances of the Browns winning a game in 2017, who finished 0–16. Additionally, because the Patriots also won their game against the Jets that same day, the Steelers were unable to finish with the #1 seed, as the Patriots held the head-to-head tiebreaker with their victory against the Steelers two weeks back. The Steelers entered the postseason with the 2nd seed in the AFC and, like the Patriots, had a 1st-round bye.

=== Team leaders ===
Category	Player(s)	Value
Passing yards	Ben Roethlisberger	4,251
Passing touchdowns	Ben Roethlisberger	28
Rushing yards	Le'Veon Bell	1,291
Rushing touchdowns	Le'Veon Bell	9
Receptions	Antonio Brown	101
Receiving yards	Antonio Brown	1,533
Receiving touchdowns	Antonio Brown	9
Points	Chris Boswell	142
Kickoff return yards	JuJu Smith-Schuster	240
Punt return yards	Eli Rogers	146
Tackles	Sean Davis	92
Sacks	Cameron Heyward	12
Forced fumbles	Cameron Heyward Ryan Shazier William Gay	2
Interceptions	Sean Davis Ryan Shazier	2

=== Standings ===
==== Division ====
AFC North
	W	L	T	PCT	DIV	CONF	PF	PA	STK
^{(2)} Pittsburgh Steelers	13	3	0	.813	6–0	10–2	406	308	W2
Baltimore Ravens	9	7	0	.563	3–3	7–5	395	303	L1
Cincinnati Bengals	7	9	0	.438	3–3	6–6	290	349	W2
Cleveland Browns	0	16	0	.000	0–6	0–12	234	410	L16

==== Conference ====
AFC
#	Team	Division	W	L	T	PCT	DIV	CONF	SOS	SOV	STK
**Division leaders**
1 (Note: New England claimed the No. 1 seed over Pittsburgh based on head-to-head victory.)	New England Patriots	East	13	3	0	.813	5–1	10–2	.484	.466	W3
2	Pittsburgh Steelers	North	13	3	0	.813	6–0	10–2	.453	.423	W2
3 (Note: Jacksonville claimed the No. 3 seed over Kansas City based on conference record.)	Jacksonville Jaguars	South	10	6	0	.625	4–2	9–3	.434	.394	L2
4	Kansas City Chiefs	West	10	6	0	.625	5–1	8–4	.477	.481	W4
**Wild Cards**
5 (Note: Tennessee finished ahead of Buffalo, Baltimore and Los Angeles Chargers based on conference record, claiming the No. 5 seed. Buffalo and Baltimore finished ahead of Los Angeles Chargers based on conference record. Buffalo claimed the No. 6 seed over Baltimore based on strength of victory.)	Tennessee Titans	South	9	7	0	.563	5–1	8–4	.434	.396	W1
6	Buffalo Bills	East	9	7	0	.563	3–3	7–5	.492	.396	W1
**Did not qualify for the postseason**
7	Baltimore Ravens	North	9	7	0	.563	3–3	7–5	.441	.299	L1
8	Los Angeles Chargers	West	9	7	0	.563	3–3	6–6	.457	.347	W2
9	Cincinnati Bengals	North	7	9	0	.438	3–3	6–6	.465	.321	W2
10 (Note: Oakland finished ahead of Miami based on head-to-head victory.)	Oakland Raiders	West	6	10	0	.375	2–4	5–7	.512	.396	L4
11	Miami Dolphins	East	6	10	0	.375	2–4	5–7	.543	.531	L3
12 (Note: Denver finished ahead of the New York Jets based on head-to-head victory.)	Denver Broncos	West	5	11	0	.313	2–4	4–8	.492	.413	L2
13	New York Jets	East	5	11	0	.313	2–4	5–7	.520	.438	L4
14 (Note: Indianapolis finished ahead of Houston based on head-to-head sweep.)	Indianapolis Colts	South	4	12	0	.250	2–4	3–9	.480	.219	W1
15	Houston Texans	South	4	12	0	.250	1–5	3–9	.516	.375	L6
16	Cleveland Browns	North	0	16	0	.000	0–6	0–12	.520	–	L16
**Tiebreakers** (Note: When breaking ties for three or more teams under the NFL's rules, they are first broken within divisions, then comparing only the highest ranked remaining team from each division.)

== Postseason ==
=== Schedule ===
Round	Date	Opponent (seed)	Result	Record	Venue	Recap
Wild Card	First-round bye					
Divisional	January 14, 2018	Jacksonville Jaguars (3)	L 42–45	0–1	Heinz Field	Recap

=== Game summaries ===
==== AFC Divisional Playoffs: vs. (3) Jacksonville Jaguars ====
AFC Divisional Playoffs: (3) Jacksonville Jaguars at (2) Pittsburgh Steelers – Game summary

Quarter	1	2	3	4	Total
Jaguars	14	14	0	17	45
Steelers	0	14	7	21	42

at Heinz Field, Pittsburgh, Pennsylvania

- Date: January 14, 2018
- Game time: 1:05 p.m. EST
- Game weather: 18 °F (−8 °C), sunny
- Game attendance: 64,524
- Referee: Brad Allen
- TV announcers (CBS): Ian Eagle, Dan Fouts and Evan Washburn
- Recap, Gamebook

Game information

1st quarter

- JAX – Leonard Fournette 1-yard run (Josh Lambo kick), 10:44. Jaguars 7–0. Drive: 8 plays, 66 yards, 4:20.
- JAX – Leonard Fournette 18-yard run (Josh Lambo kick), 5:31. Jaguars 14–0. Drive: 1 play, 18 yards, 0:13.

2nd quarter

- JAX – T. J. Yeldon 4-yard run (Josh Lambo kick), 11:36. Jaguars 21–0. Drive: 11 plays, 75 yards, 4:36.
- PIT – Antonio Brown 23-yard pass from Ben Roethlisberger (Chris Boswell kick), 8:26. Jaguars 21–7. Drive: 6 plays, 64 yards, 3:11.
- JAX – Telvin Smith 50-yard fumble return (Josh Lambo kick), 2:33 Jaguars 28–7.
- PIT – Martavis Bryant 36-yard pass from Ben Roethlisberger (Chris Boswell kick), 0:32. Jaguars 28–14. Drive: 7 plays, 51 yards, 1:55.

3rd quarter

- PIT – Le'Veon Bell 19-yard pass from Ben Roethlisberger (Chris Boswell kick), 0:32. Jaguars 28–21. Drive: 10 plays, 77 yards, 5:51.

4th quarter

- JAX – Leonard Fournette 3-yard run (Josh Lambo kick), 10:39. Jaguars 35–21. Drive: 5 plays, 61 yards, 2:10.
- PIT – Antonio Brown 43-yard pass from Ben Roethlisberger (Chris Boswell kick), 9:14. Jaguars 35–28. Drive: 5 plays, 75 yards, 1:29.
- JAX – Tommy Bohanon 14-yard pass from Blake Bortles (Josh Lambo kick), 4:24. Jaguars 42–28. Drive: 8 plays, 75 yards, 4:46.
- PIT – Le'Veon Bell 8-yard run (Chris Boswell kick), 2:27. Jaguars 42–35. Drive: 12 plays, 75 yards, 2:01.
- JAX – Josh Lambo 45-yard field goal, 1:50. Jaguars 45–35. Drive: 4 plays, 9 yards, 0:33.
- PIT – JuJu Smith-Schuster 4-yard pass from Ben Roethlisberger (Chris Boswell kick), 0:04. Jaguars 45–42. Drive: 10 plays, 75 yards, 1:44.

Top passers

- JAX – Blake Bortles – 14/26, 214 yards, TD
- PIT – Ben Roethlisberger – 37/58, 469 yards, 5 TD, INT

Top rushers

- JAX – Leonard Fournette – 25 rushes, 109 yards, 3 TD
- PIT – Le'Veon Bell – 16 rushes, 67 yards, TD

Top receivers

- JAX – T. J. Yeldon – 3 receptions, 57 yards
- PIT – Antonio Brown – 7 receptions, 132 yards, 2 TD

The Steelers faced the Jaguars in the Divisional Round in a rematch of week 5, in the first quarter the Jaguars jumped out to a lead of 14–0 when Leonard Fournette ran for touchdowns from a yard and then 18-yards out. In the second quarter, they increased their lead to 21–0 when T.J. Yeldon ran for a 4-yard touchdown. The Steelers got on the board when Ben Roethlisberger found Antonio Brown on a 23-yard pass to make it 21–7. The Jaguars pulled away again when Telvin Smith returned a fumble 50 yards for a touchdown to make it 28–7, though the Steelers managed to decrease the deficit to 14 points at halftime when Roethlisberger found Martavis Bryant on a 36-yard pass to make the score 28–14. In the third quarter, the Steelers scored the only points when Roethlisberger found Bell on a 19-yard pass to make it 28–21. In the fourth quarter, the Jaguars pulled away when Fournette ran for a 3-yard touchdown to make it 35–21. The Steelers came within a touchdown again when Roethlisberger and Brown connected again on a 43-yard pass to make it 35–28. Though again, the Jaguars pulled away when Tommy Bohanon and Blake Bortles connected on a 14-yard pass to make it 42–28. Bell then ran for an 8-yard touchdown to make the score 42–35. However, the Jaguars sealed the game with Josh Lambo's 45-yard field goal to make it 45–35. With the ball back in the final seconds, the Steelers scored on their last play of the game and season when Roethlisberger connected with JuJu Smith-Schuster to make the final score 45–42.

With the loss, the Steelers finished their season 13–4. Ben Roethlisberger is also the first QB in NFL history to throw five touchdown passes in a postseason game and lose. Following the loss, the Steelers were criticized by their fans and the media for looking past the Jaguars and anticipating a rematch with the New England Patriots in the AFC Championship game.

This would also be the last game that running back Le'Veon Bell would play for the Steelers, as he would sit out the 2018 season due to a contract dispute, then sign with the New York Jets once he became a free agent at the start of 2019.

== Awards ==
AFC Offensive Player of The Week/Month
Position	Player	Week/Month
RB	Le'Veon Bell	6
WR	Antonio Brown	11
WR	JuJu Smith-Schuster	8
QB	Ben Roethlisberger	14
RB	Le'Veon Bell	December

AFC Defensive Player of The Week/Month
Position	Player	Week/Month
DE	Cameron Heyward	4, 12
CB	Mike Hilton	16

AFC Special Teams Player of The Week/Month
Position	Player	Week/Month
K	Chris Boswell	13
KR	JuJu Smith-Schuster	17

Other Awards
Award	Position	Player	Week
Castrol Edge Clutch Performer of The Week	WR	Antonio Brown	11
FEDEX Air Player of The Week	QB	Ben Roethlisberger	14
FEDEX Ground Player of The Week	RB	Le'Veon Bell	4
