= Sean Spence =

American football player (born 1990)

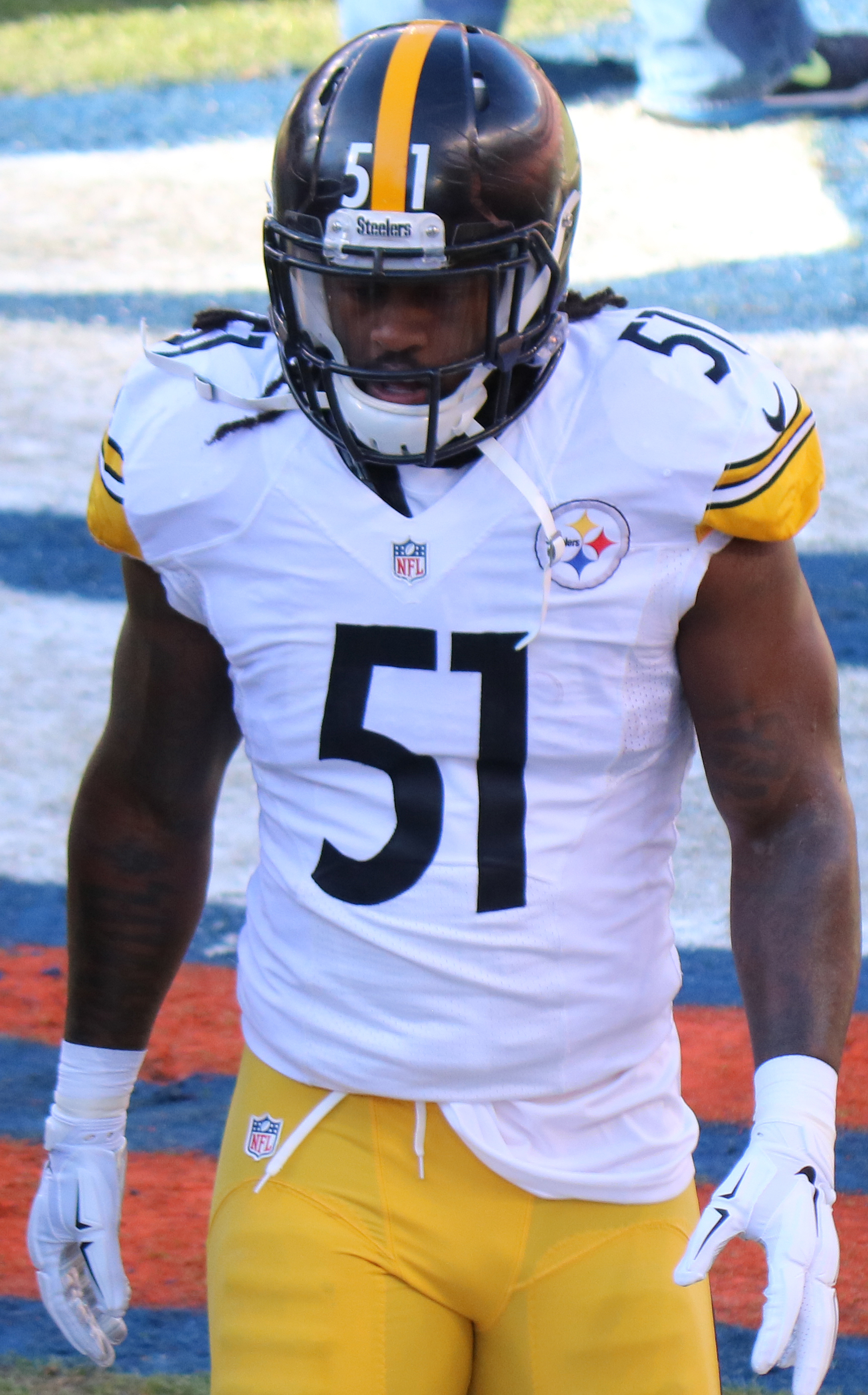
- Spence with the Pittsburgh Steelers in 2016

Los Angeles Chargers
- Title: Linebackers coach

Personal information
- Born: June 7, 1990 (age 36); Miami, Florida, U.S.
- Listed height: 5 ft 11 in (1.80 m)
- Listed weight: 231 lb (105 kg)

Career information
- High school: Miami Northwestern
- College: Miami (FL)
- NFL draft: 2012: 3rd round, 86th overall pick

Career history

Playing
- Pittsburgh Steelers (2012–2015); Tennessee Titans (2016); Indianapolis Colts (2017); Pittsburgh Steelers (2017)

Coaching
- Western Michigan (2023) Special teams analyst; Western Michigan (2024) Linebackers coach; Western Michigan (2025) Edges coach; Los Angeles Chargers (2026–present) Linebackers coach

Awards and highlights
- ACC Defensive Rookie of the Year (2008); First-team All-ACC (2011); Second-team All-ACC (2010)

Career NFL statistics
- Total tackles: 163
- Sacks: 6
- Forced fumbles: 2
- Fumble recoveries: 1
- Stats at Pro Football Reference

Sean Ryan Christopher Spence (born June 7, 1990) is an American football coach and former professional linebacker. He is the inside linebackers coach for the Los Angeles Chargers of the National Football League (NFL). He was selected by the Pittsburgh Steelers in the third round of the 2012 NFL draft. He played college football at the University of Miami, where he was named 2008 Atlantic Coast Conference Defensive Rookie of the Year. Spence was also a member of the Tennessee Titans and Indianapolis Colts.

== Early life ==
At Miami Northwestern High School, Spence was part of the 2007 national championship team as chosen by USA Today. His teammates included Lavonte David, Marcus Forston, Jacory Harris, Tommy Streeter, and Brandon Washington. As a senior, made more than 100 tackles, with three quarterback sacks, two interceptions (one for a TD). As a junior in 2006, made 147 tackles, 10 for losses, with two interceptions (one for a touchdown) and three sacks.

Spence played in the inaugural Under Armour All-America Game. Considered a four-star recruit by Rivals.com, Spence was listed as the No. 13 outside linebacker in the nation.

== College career ==
Playing as a true freshman, Spence was a starter in the University of Miami's final eight games, and ranked third on the team with 62 tackles to go along with 7.5 tackles for loss, and a pair of sacks. He was named to College Football News′ All-Freshman first team, as well as Rivals.com′s 2008 Freshman All-America team.

Four weeks into the 2010 season, Spence had team-highs in tackles (38) and tackles for loss (6.5) in only four games. At the end of the 2011 season, Spence earned first-team All-ACC recognition for the 2011 season. The senior captain, who tied for fifth place in the Atlantic Coast Conference with 106 total tackles in 2011, ended the year second among all NCAA players with 47 career tackles for loss, including 14.0 in 2011. A semifinalist for the Butkus Award, Spence averaged 9.64 tackles per game (fourth in conference) and 1.27 tackles for loss per game (third in conference) in 2011. He finished the season with three sacks, one pass break-up and one forced fumble.

== Professional career ==
Pre-draft measurables
Height	Weight	Arm length	Hand span	Wingspan	40-yard dash	10-yard split	20-yard split	20-yard shuttle	Three-cone drill	Vertical jump	Broad jump	Bench press
5 ft 11 3/8 in (1.81 m)	231 lb (105 kg)	31 1/2 in (0.80 m)	9 1/4 in (0.23 m)	6 ft 2 1/2 in (1.89 m)	4.71 s	1.63 s	2.70 s	4.28 s	7.08 s	33.5 in (0.85 m)	9 ft 11 in (3.02 m)	12 reps
All values from NFL Combine/Pro Day

=== Pittsburgh Steelers (first stint) ===
The Pittsburgh Steelers selected Spence in the third round (86th overall) of the 2012 NFL draft. He was the 11th linebacker selected in 2012.

On May 29, 2012, the Pittsburgh Steelers signed Spence to a four-year, $2.70 million contract.

He suffered a serious knee injury during the preseason and was declared out for the entire 2012 season. On August 25, 2013, the Steelers placed Spence on the Reserve/Physically Unable To Perform (PUP) List. Three weeks after being taken off of the PUP list, the Steelers placed Spence on injured reserve, ending his injury-ridden 2013 season. Sean Spence finished the 2014 season with 53 tackles and 1 sack for the Steelers, finishing with a record of 11–5 and winning the AFC North Division. Spence, who missed one game and didn't finish two due to hamstring injuries, had 37 tackles and a sack as the Steelers completed the 2015 regular season with a 10–6 mark. The Steelers won their first round playoff game against the Cincinnati Bengals before dropping the next to Denver.

=== Tennessee Titans ===
On March 16, 2016, the Tennessee Titans signed Spence to a one-year, $2.5 million contract, reuniting him with former Steelers defensive coordinator Dick LeBeau. Spence finished the 2016 season with 50 tackles, three sacks, and one forced fumble.

=== Indianapolis Colts ===
On March 19, 2017, Spence signed a one-year, $3 million contract with the Indianapolis Colts. On September 2, the Colts released Spence as part of the final roster cuts. He was re-signed by the team on September 13, but was released again on October 3.

=== Pittsburgh Steelers (second stint) ===
On December 5, 2017, the Steelers signed Spence to a one-year, $775,000 contract after injuries to Ryan Shazier and Tyler Matakevich.

== Coaching career ==
On February 16, 2026, Spence was hired by the Los Angeles Chargers to serve as the team's inside linebackers coach under head coach Jim Harbaugh.

== NFL career statistics ==
Legend
**Bold**	Career high

=== Regular season ===
Year	Team	Games		Tackles					Interceptions					Fumbles			
Year	Team	GP	GS	Cmb	Solo	Ast	Sck	TFL	Int	Yds	TD	Lng	PD	FF	FR	Yds	TD
2014	PIT	16	9	53	34	**19**	1.0	3	0	0	0	0	0	**1**	**1**	0	0
2015	PIT	15	4	37	29	8	1.0	**4**	0	0	0	0	0	0	0	0	0
2016	TEN	15	6	**54**	**37**	17	**3.0**	2	0	0	0	0	**3**	**1**	0	0	0
2017	IND	3	0	0	0	0	0.0	0	0	0	0	0	0	0	0	0	0
2017	PIT	4	4	19	11	8	1.0	1	0	0	0	0	0	0	0	0	0
Career		53	23	163	111	52	6.0	10	0	0	0	0	3	2	1	0	0

=== Playoffs ===
Year	Team	Games		Tackles					Interceptions					Fumbles			
Year	Team	GP	GS	Cmb	Solo	Ast	Sck	TFL	Int	Yds	TD	Lng	PD	FF	FR	Yds	TD
2014	PIT	1	1	2	1	1	**1.0**	0	0	0	0	0	0	**1**	0	0	0
2015	PIT	2	0	0	0	0	0.0	0	0	0	0	0	0	0	0	0	0
2017	PIT	1	1	**5**	**3**	**2**	0.0	0	0	0	0	0	0	0	0	0	0
Career		4	2	7	4	3	1.0	0	0	0	0	0	0	1	0	0	0
