= Keion Adams =

American gridiron football player (born 1995)

No. 97, 54
- Position: Defensive lineman

Personal information
- Born: June 8, 1995 (age 31); Salisbury, North Carolina, U.S.
- Listed height: 6 ft 2 in (1.88 m)
- Listed weight: 240 lb (109 kg)

Career information
- High school: Salisbury (NC)
- College: Western Michigan
- NFL draft: 2017: 7th round, 248th overall pick

Career history
- Pittsburgh Steelers (2017–2018); New York Giants (2019); Saskatchewan Roughriders (2021–2022); Winnipeg Blue Bombers (2022)

Awards and highlights
- Second-team All-MAC (2016)
- Stats at Pro Football Reference
- Stats at CFL.ca

Keion Adams (born June 8, 1995) is an American former professional football defensive lineman. He played college football at Western Michigan. He was selected by the Pittsburgh Steelers in the seventh round of the 2017 NFL draft.

== Professional career ==
Pre-draft measurables
Height	Weight	Arm length	Hand span	40-yard dash	10-yard split	20-yard split	20-yard shuttle	Three-cone drill	Vertical jump	Broad jump	Bench press
6 ft 2 in (1.88 m)	247 lb (112 kg)	32 1/4 in (0.82 m)	9 1/2 in (0.24 m)	4.70 s	1.63 s	2.70 s	4.38 s	7.36 s	36 in (0.91 m)	10 ft 4 in (3.15 m)	27 reps
All values from Western Michigan's Pro Day

=== Pittsburgh Steelers ===
The Pittsburgh Steelers selected Adams in the seventh round (248th overall) of the 2017 NFL draft. Adams was the 24th defensive end drafted that year and the 42nd player selected from Western Michigan. With the selection of Adams, Western Michigan had three players selected that year setting a school record for a single draft. The other two players drafted were Corey Davis and Taylor Moton.

On May 10, 2017, the Steelers signed Adams to a four-year, $2.46 million contract that includes a signing bonus of $66,017.

He was placed on injured reserve on August 29, 2017, after suffering a shoulder injury.

On September 1, 2018, Adams was waived by the Steelers and was signed to the practice squad the next day. He signed a reserve/future contract with the Steelers on January 1, 2019.

Adams was released on May 13, 2019.

=== New York Giants ===
On June 4, 2019, Adams signed with the New York Giants. He was waived/injured on August 31, 2019, and reverted to the Giants' injured reserve. He was waived from injured reserve on October 21, 2019.

=== Saskatchewan Roughriders ===
Adams signed with the Saskatchewan Roughriders of the Canadian Football League (CFL) on December 29, 2020. Over the 2021 and 2022 seasons, he played in 16 regular season games where he recorded 27 tackles and four sacks. He was transferred to the practice roster on August 25, 2022, before being released on September 26, 2022.

=== Winnipeg Blue Bombers ===
On September 28, 2022, it was announced that Adams had signed a practice roster agreement with the Winnipeg Blue Bombers. In October 2022, as he signed with the team, he learned two of his cousins had died in a car accident back home. On February 14, 2023, Adams became a free agent.

== Personal life ==
Adams is the son of Desmond Adams and Tanika Burnon.
