= Ryan Shazier =

American football player (born 1992)

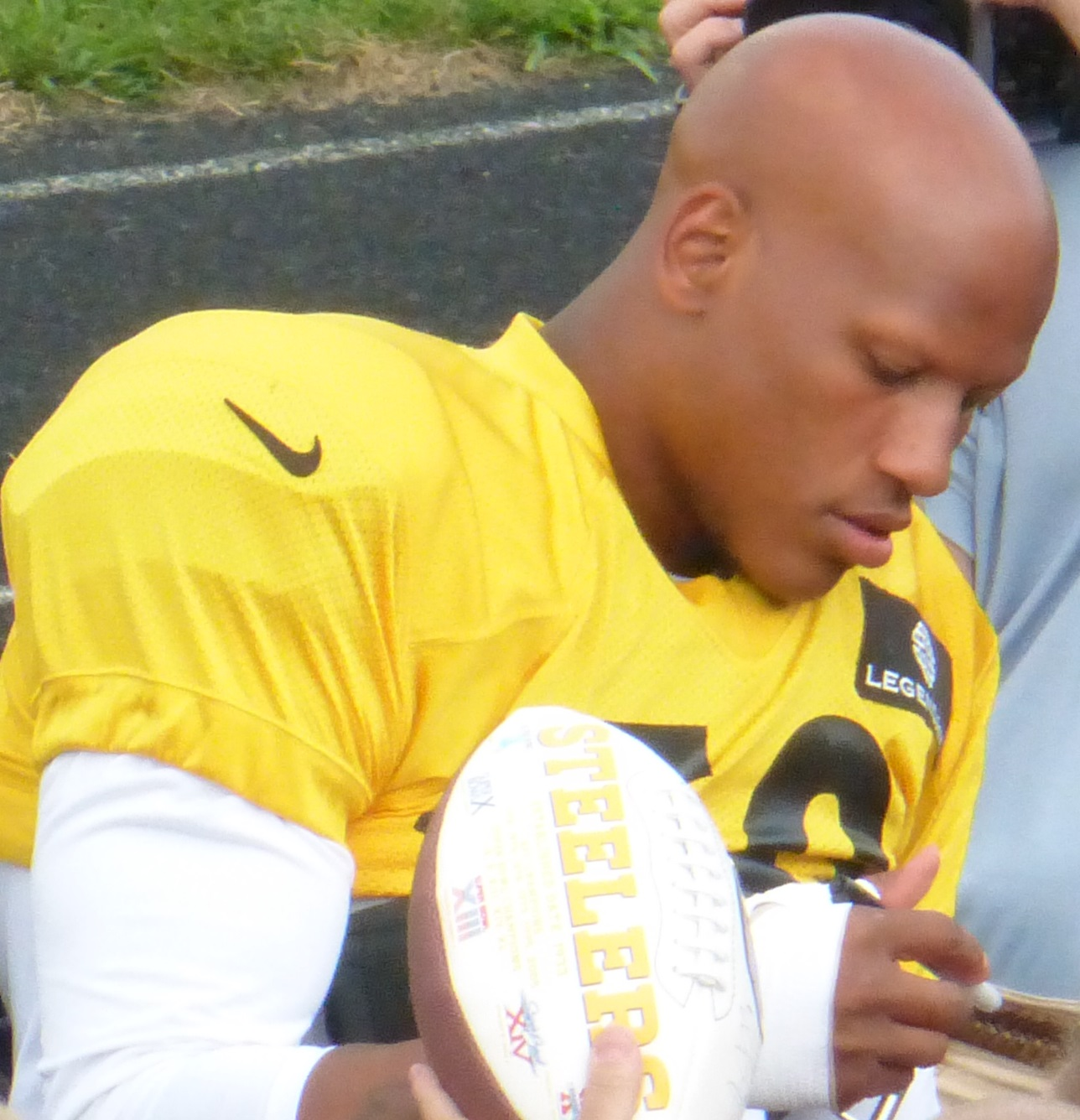
- Shazier signing autographs in 2014

No. 50
- Position: Linebacker

Personal information
- Born: September 6, 1992 (age 34); Fort Lauderdale, Florida, U.S.
- Listed height: 6 ft 1 in (1.85 m)
- Listed weight: 230 lb (104 kg)

Career information
- High school: Plantation (Plantation, Florida)
- College: Ohio State (2011–2013)
- NFL draft: 2014: 1st round, 15th overall pick

Career history

Playing
- Pittsburgh Steelers (2014–2019)

Coaching
- Pittsburgh Steelers (2024–2025) Offensive assistant

Awards and highlights
- 2× Pro Bowl (2016, 2017); George Halas Award (2019); First-team All-American (2013); 2× First-team All-Big Ten (2012, 2013)

Career NFL statistics
- Tackles: 299
- Forced fumbles: 7
- Fumble recoveries: 3
- Pass deflections: 25
- Interceptions: 7
- Interception yards: 2
- Sacks: 7
- Stats at Pro Football Reference

Ryan Dean Shazier (/ʃeɪˈzɪər/; born September 6, 1992) is an American former professional football linebacker who played for the Pittsburgh Steelers of the National Football League (NFL). He played college football for the Ohio State Buckeyes and was selected by the Steelers in the first round of the 2014 NFL draft.

Shazier had a successful first few seasons in the NFL, including a Pro Bowl appearance in 2016. During the 2017 season, in a game against the Cincinnati Bengals, Shazier attempted to make a tackle that left him a paraplegic, after which he had to have spinal stabilization surgery and learn to walk again. After spending two seasons on the Steelers' physically unable to perform list, Shazier announced his retirement from football in 2020.

== Early life ==
Ryan Dean Shazier was born on September 6, 1992, in Fort Lauderdale, Florida. He attended Plantation High School in Plantation, Florida.

== College career ==
Shazier initially committed to play for Urban Meyer at Florida but rescinded his commitment after Meyer resigned as the Gators head coach. He then committed to play under Jim Tressel at Ohio State, but Tressel resigned five months later and was eventually replaced with Urban Meyer.

As a true freshman, Shazier played in every regular season contest and started 3 games. His first start came near the end of the season against Penn State, where he recorded 15 tackles. He started the next two games and ended his season with 57 tackles, 5 tackles for a loss, 3 sacks, and 2 forced fumbles.

In 2012, he started all 12 regular season games for Ohio State. Against Penn State, Shazier posted 8 tackles, 2 sacks, and an interception in the third quarter that he returned for the game-deciding touchdown. In a victory against Wisconsin, he had 12 tackles, three tackles for a loss, and he made a game-saving tackle on a goal line stand on fourth and inches. He would finish 2012 leading the Big Ten Conference with 17 tackles for a loss and place second in the league with 115 tackles. Shazier also had 5 sacks and 3 forced fumbles for the season.

Against Indiana in 2013, he posted more than 20 tackles and tied the school record with 16 solo tackles and 5 tackles for loss. He was voted a first-team All-American by the Associated Press, USA Today, ESPN.com, and Sports Illustrated. His 101 solo tackles were the second best in the league and his 143 tackles led the Big Ten. He also had a career-high 6 sacks and 4 forced fumbles.

On January 5, 2014, Shazier announced that he would forgo his senior season and enter the 2014 NFL draft.

Shazier finished his career at Ohio State with 315 tackles, 208 solo tackles, and 14.5 sacks.

== Professional career ==
=== Pre-draft ===
Coming out of Ohio State, many analysts and scouts projected him as an early-to-mid first round draft selection. He was ranked the third best outside linebacker (19th overall) by NFLDraftScout.com. He participated at the NFL Combine and performed the majority of positional and combine drills except for the 40, 20, and 10 yard dash. Shazier also participated at Ohio State's Pro Day and completed the combine drills he didn't perform at the NFL Combine. On scouting reports, scouts and analysts listed his best attributes as: athleticism, agility, production, flexibility, acceleration, strong hands, and lateral movement. Reports considered his flaws as his: lack of ideal size, under developed vision, instincts, anticipation, and lack of awareness. NFL draft analyst Mike Mayock ranked Shazier as the fourth best linebacker (18th overall) prospect in the draft. NFL.com media analyst Daniel Jeremiah ranked him as the fourth best linebacker (25th overall) in the draft. Former NFL executive Gil Brandt listed Shazier as the third best linebacker (19th overall) in the draft.

Pre-draft measurables
Height	Weight	Arm length	Hand span	40-yard dash	10-yard split	20-yard split	20-yard shuttle	Three-cone drill	Vertical jump	Broad jump	Bench press
6 ft 1 1/8 in (1.86 m)	237 lb (108 kg)	32 3/8 in (0.82 m)	10 in (0.25 m)	4.38 s	1.56 s	2.58 s	4.21 s	6.91 s	42 in (1.07 m)	10 ft 10 in (3.30 m)	25 reps
All values from NFL Combine and Ohio State's Pro Day.

=== 2014 ===
The Pittsburgh Steelers selected Shazier in the first round (15th overall) of the 2014 NFL draft. He was the third linebacker taken in the draft behind Khalil Mack (5th overall) and Anthony Barr (9th overall).

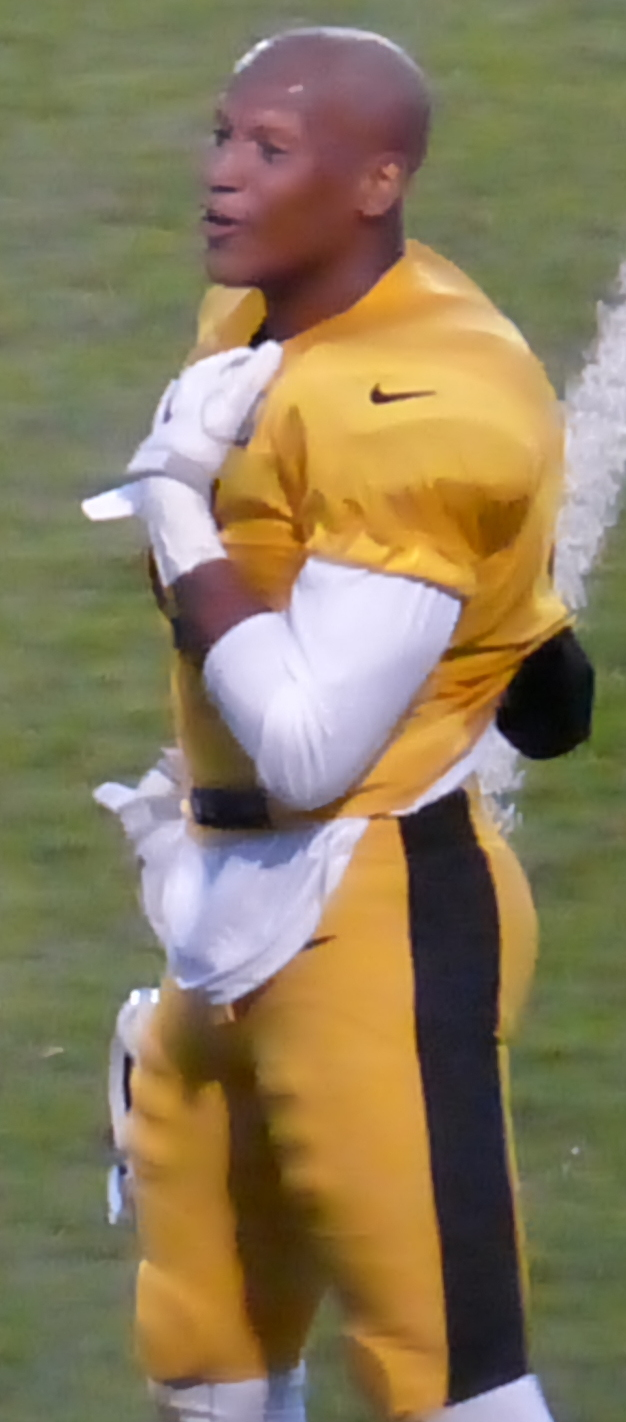
Shazier with the Pittsburgh Steelers in 2014

On June 5, 2014, the Steelers signed Shazier to a fully guaranteed four-year, $9.50 million contract with a signing bonus of $5.23 million.

Shazier began the season as the starting left inside linebacker. He made his professional regular season debut and first career start in the Steelers' home opener against the Cleveland Browns. In his first career game, he made six total tackles (five solo) and a pass deflection. The following week against the Baltimore Ravens, he had 15 total tackles, with 11 of them being solo, in a 6–20 loss. Shazier missed weeks 4–7 of his rookie season with a knee injury. He returned for his first game back from his injury on October 26, 2014, against the Indianapolis Colts. He finished the game with four tackles (two solo tackles). After playing two games, Shazier then injured his ankle and missed another four games. After returning, Shazier made six combined tackles in a 27–17 victory over the Cincinnati Bengals on December 24. Following an 11–5 season the Steelers made the playoffs. In his first career playoff game, Shazier made 3 solo tackles and one assist in a 17–30 wild-card loss to the Baltimore Ravens. In his first season, he finished with a total of 36 tackles, 24 solo tackles, and a pass deflection in five starts and eight games.

=== 2015 ===
After his rookie season, Shazier returned the next season to again be the starting inside linebacker. On September 10, 2015, Shazier made five solo tackles and two assists in the season opener at the New England Patriots. The next game against the San Francisco 49ers, he left the game with a shoulder injury in the fourth quarter after making a career-high 15 total tackles and 11 solo tackles. He also sacked 49ers quarterback Colin Kaepernick for his first career sack. Shazier missed weeks 3–6 with nerve damage in his shoulder. After returning, he made five solo tackles, one assist, and a sack in a Week 10 win over the Cleveland Browns. On November 29, 2015, he sustained a concussion and left in the fourth quarter against the Seattle Seahawks. On December 20, 2015, Shazier made three solo tackles, three assists, and three pass deflections in a 34–27 win over the Denver Broncos. He also made his first career interception, after picking off Broncos quarterback Brock Osweiler. On January 9, 2016, during the AFC Wildcard game against the Cincinnati Bengals, Shazier stripped the ball from Jeremy Hill with 1:36 left in the fourth quarter. The ball was recovered by Ross Cockrell, leading to the game-winning field goal from Chris Boswell. Shazier finished the 18–16 victory with nine combined tackles and two forced fumbles. He finished the season with 87 combined tackles, 3 1/2 sacks, and an interception in 12 starts and 12 games.

=== 2016 ===
Shazier returned to his starting inside linebacker role to begin the 2016 season. He started the Steelers' season-opener against the Washington Redskins and made six combined tackles, two pass deflections, a forced fumble, and intercepted Kirk Cousins as the Steelers routed the Redskins 38–16. The next game, Shazier recorded a season-high 12 combined tackles in a 24–16 victory over the Bengals. He re-injured his knee the following game against the Philadelphia Eagles and was inactive from Weeks 4–6. He made his return in a Week 7 matchup against the New England Patriots and was limited to two assisted tackles and a pass deflection in the 27–16 loss. On November 20, 2016, Shazier racked up seven total tackles, a pass deflection, and sacked Josh McCown for his first of the season, as the Steelers defeated the Cleveland Browns 24–9. On December 25, 2016, he recorded ten combined tackles and intercepted Joe Flacco in a 31–27 playoff clinching victory over the Baltimore Ravens. The next game, Shazier made eight combined tackles and intercepted Robert Griffin III in a 27–24 win over the Browns on their season finale.

He finished the regular season with 87 combined tackles, 9 pass deflections, 3 1/2 sacks, and 3 interceptions in 12 starts and 13 games. On January 8, 2017, Shazier recorded six combined tackles and intercepted Matt Moore, as the Steelers defeated the Miami Dolphins in the AFC Wildcard game 30–12. On January 15, 2017, he recorded 5 combined tackles and intercepted Alex Smith in the Steelers' 18–16 Divisional Round victory over the Kansas City Chiefs.

=== 2017 ===
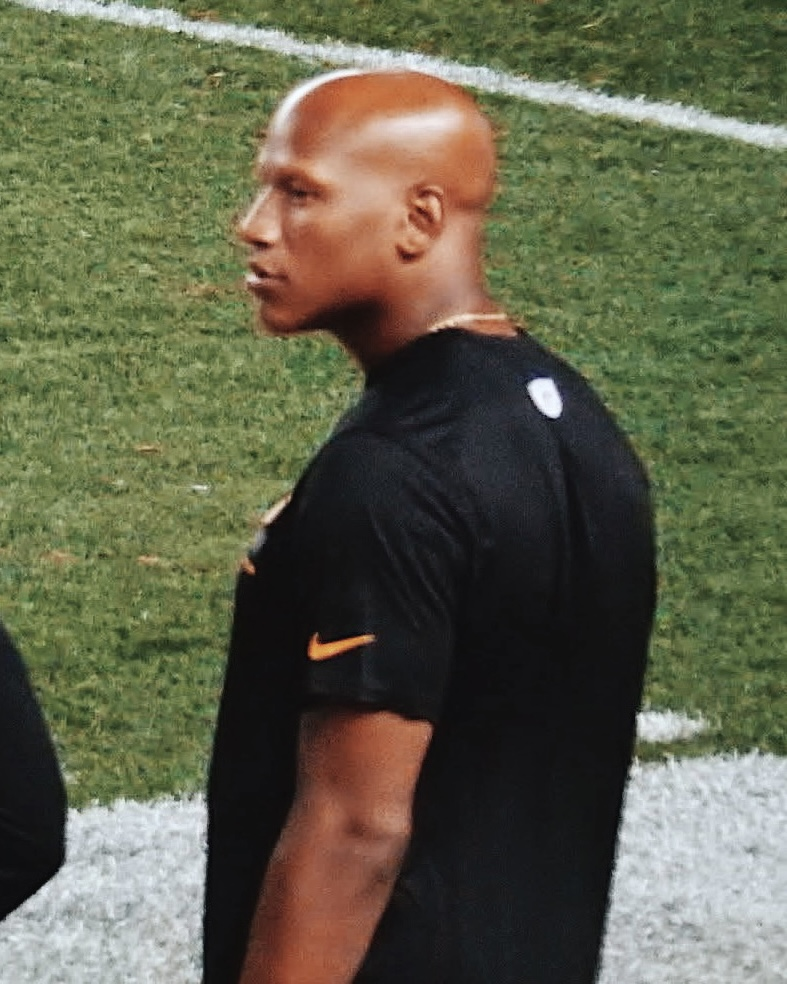
Shazier in 2017

On April 24, 2017, the Steelers picked up the fifth-year option on Shazier's contract. On September 10, 2017, he had one of the best statistical games of his career, tying a career-high with 11 solo tackles and forcing a career-high of two forced fumbles during a 21–18 victory over the Browns.

==== Spinal injury ====
During a Monday Night Football game against the Bengals on December 4, 2017, Shazier sustained what appeared to be a severe back injury after a head-on tackle. The hit left Shazier seemingly unable to move his legs. After stabilization he was taken to the hospital and the next morning revealed that he had sustained a spinal contusion. On December 7, Shazier underwent spinal stabilization surgery to secure the injured section of spine and to aid in his recovery. The surgery ended his 2017 season. Despite the injury, Shazier was named to his second Pro Bowl on December 19, 2017. He was ranked 47th by his peers on the NFL Top 100 Players of 2018.

On February 28, 2018, Steelers GM Kevin Colbert announced that Shazier would not be able to play during the 2018 season. On April 26, 2018, Shazier walked onto the AT&T Stadium stage with his fiancée, Michelle Rodriguez, to announce the 28th pick of the NFL draft, Terrell Edmunds. On May 2, the Steelers placed Shazier on the reserve/PUP list, ending his 2018 season. On November 30, 2018, Shazier jogged for the first time since his spinal stabilization surgery, according to Steelers linebacker coach Joey Porter. On April 29, 2019, the Steelers placed Shazier on the reserve/PUP list, ending his 2019 season. The Steelers placed Shazier on the reserve/retired list on March 17, 2020, effectively ending his playing career. On September 9, 2020, Shazier announced his retirement from the NFL.

== Coaching career ==
In 2024, Shazier returned to the Steelers organization to take a job as an offensive assistant.

== Career statistics ==
Legend
**Bold**	Career high

=== NFL ===
Year	Team	Games		Tackles				Interceptions						Fumble		
Year	Team	GP	GS	Cmb	Solo	Ast	Sck	Int	Yds	Avg	Lng	TD	PD	FF	FR	Yds
2014	PIT	9	5	36	24	12	0.0	0	0	0.0	0	0	1	0	0	0
2015	PIT	12	12	87	55	**32**	**3.5**	1	0	0.0	0	0	4	2	**1**	0
2016	PIT	13	12	87	55	**32**	**3.5**	**3**	0	0.0	0	0	9	**3**	**1**	0
2017	PIT	12	12	**89**	**68**	21	0.0	**3**	**2**	**0.7**	**2**	0	**11**	2	**1**	**3**
2018	PIT	0	0	Did not play due to injury												
2019	PIT	0	0	Did not play due to injury												
Career		46	41	299	202	97	7.0	7	2	0.3	2	0	25	7	3	3

=== College ===
Season	Team	GP	Tackles					Interceptions					Fumbles		
Season	Team	GP	Cmb	Solo	Ast	TfL	Sck	Int	Yds	Avg	TD	PD	FF	FR	Yds
2011	Ohio State	13	58	38	20	5.0	3.0	0	0	0.0	0	0	1	0	0
2012	Ohio State	12	115	70	**45**	17.0	5.0	**1**	**17**	**17.0**	**1**	0	0	0	0
2013	Ohio State	14	**144**	**102**	42	**23.5**	**7.0**	0	0	0.0	0	**4**	**4**	0	0
Totals		39	317	210	107	45.5	15.0	1	17	17.0	1	4	5	0	0

== Personal life ==
Shazier has alopecia, an autoimmune condition which prevents the growth of hair on the body. Throughout his childhood, he was the subject of ridicule and taunting because of this. However, with support and encouragement from his parents, Shazier developed an altruistic temperament to deal with the jabs and name calling. In May 2017, he wrote of his experiences when his hair unexpectedly began growing back.

On May 3, 2019, Shazier married Michelle Rodriguez. Seventeen months after suffering the spinal injury that doctors feared would leave him paralyzed, Shazier was able to dance at his wedding. Shazier has a son from a previous relationship named Ryan Dean Shazier Jr., and another son born in January 2019 to him and Rodriguez. In November 2023, Shazier was accused of infidelity by Rodriguez, and was also discovered to have sent text messages to a reported girlfriend. In January 2024, Shazier filed for divorce.

In the fall of 2019, Shazier returned to college, and graduated in December 2020 at his alma mater, Ohio State University.

In January 2023, Shazier partnered with the cannabis company Organic Remedies to launch a line of cannabis products named Steel City Greats. Shazier says that while recovering from his spinal injury, he was seeking a "safe, natural alternative to opioid pain medications" and that cannabis provided him with a "restorative healing that allowed [him] to manage the pain through a difficult time in [his] life".
