= 2016 Pittsburgh Steelers season =

Pittsburgh Steelers 84th US football season

- Owner: The Rooney family
- General manager: Kevin Colbert
- Head coach: Mike Tomlin
- Offensive coordinator: Todd Haley
- Defensive coordinator: Keith Butler
- Home stadium: Heinz Field

Results
- Record: 11–5
- Division place: 1st AFC North
- Playoffs: Won Wild Card Playoffs (vs. Dolphins) 30–12; Won Divisional Playoffs (at Chiefs) 18–16; Lost AFC Championship (at Patriots) 17–36
- All-Pros: 3: WR Antonio Brown (1st team); FLEX Le'Veon Bell (2nd team); RG David DeCastro (2nd team)
- Pro Bowlers: 6: QB Ben Roethlisberger; RB Le'Veon Bell; WR Antonio Brown; G David DeCastro; C Maurkice Pouncey; ILB Ryan Shazier
- Team MVP: Le'Veon Bell
- Team ROY: Sean Davis

Uniform
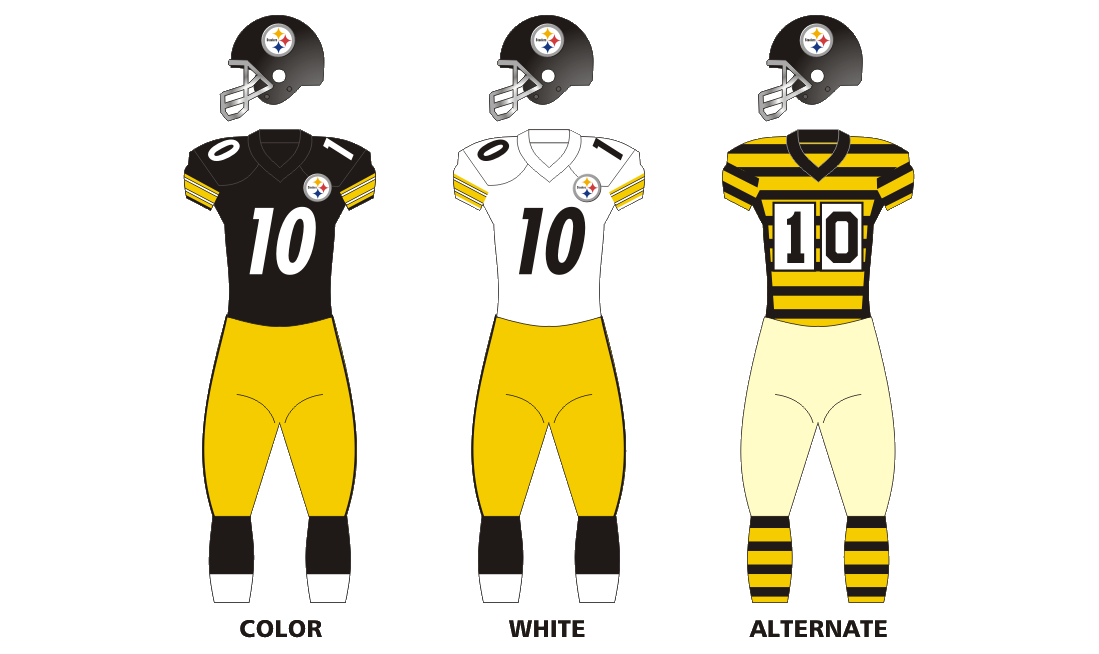

The 2016 season was the Pittsburgh Steelers' 84th in the National Football League (NFL), their 17th under general manager Kevin Colbert and their 10th under head coach Mike Tomlin. For the first time since 2004, tight end Heath Miller was not on the opening day roster, as he announced his retirement on February 19, 2016.

After going 4–5 in their first nine games, the Steelers ended their season on a high note, winning all of their last seven. The Steelers were the first team since the 2011 Green Bay Packers to play on both Thanksgiving and Christmas Day. The Steelers won the AFC North for the second time in three years and made the playoffs for the third straight year. The team also improved upon their 10–6 record from 2015. Le'Veon Bell made his career first playoff appearance with the Steelers in the 2016–17 playoffs. The Steelers went on to defeat the Miami Dolphins in the Wild Card round and the Kansas City Chiefs in the Divisional round before losing to the eventual Super Bowl champion New England Patriots 36–17 in the AFC Championship game. This was the Steelers' first appearance in the AFC Championship game since the 2010 NFL season. The team ranked 10th in both offense and defense.

This was also the final season under the ownership of Dan Rooney, as he died on April 13, 2017.

As of 2025, this is the most recent season the Steelers have won a playoff game, having gone 0–7 (including the AFC Championship loss) since.

== Draft ==
2016 Pittsburgh Steelers Draft
| Round | Selection | Player | Position | College |
|---|---|---|---|---|
| 1 | 25 | Artie Burns | CB | Miami (Fla.) |
| 2 | 58 | Sean Davis | FS | Maryland |
| 3 | 89 | Javon Hargrave | NT | S.C. State |
| 4 | 123 | Jerald Hawkins | T | LSU |
| 6 | 220 | Travis Feeney | ILB | Washington |
| 7 | 229 | Demarcus Ayers | WR | Houston |
| 7 | 246 | Tyler Matakevich | ILB | Temple |

Notes

- The Steelers traded a conditional fifth-round selection (#164 overall) to the Philadelphia Eagles in exchange for cornerback Brandon Boykin – contingent upon Boykin playing 60% of the snaps with the Steelers during the 2015 season.
- The Steelers traded their original sixth-round selection (#201 overall) to the Jacksonville Jaguars in exchange for placekicker Josh Scobee.
- The Steelers acquired a sixth-round compensatory selection (#220 overall) as a result of the departure of Brice McCain during the 2015 free agency period.
- The Steelers acquired an additional seventh-round selection (#229 overall) in a trade that sent punter Brad Wing to the New York Giants.

=== Undrafted free agents ===
All undrafted free agents were signed after the 2016 NFL draft concluded on April 30 unless otherwise noted.

| Position | Player | College | Notes |
|---|---|---|---|
| NT | Johnny Maxey | Mars Hill | |
| OLB | Tyriq McCord | Miami (Fla.) | |
| P | Will Monday | Duke | |
| DE | Giorgio Newberry | Florida State | |
| RB | Christian Powell | Colorado | |
| TE | D.J. Reeves | Duke | |
| TE | Jay Rome | Georgia | |
| C | Quinton Schooley | N.C. State | |
| WR | Canaan Severin | Virginia | |
| DE | Devaunte Sigler | Jacksonville State | |

== Staff ==
2016 Pittsburgh Steelers staff
| Front office: Chairman – Dan Rooney; President – Art Rooney II; Vice president – Art Rooney Jr.; Vice president & general manager – Kevin Colbert; Vice president of football and business administration – Omar Khan; Football administration coordinator – Samir Suleiman; Player personnel coordinator – Dan Rooney Jr.; College scouting coordinator – Phil Kreidler; Senior assistant, college scouting – Rick Reiprish; Pro personnel coordinator – Brandon Hunt; Analytics and football research coordinator – Karim Kassam; Head coaches: Head coach – Mike Tomlin; Assistant head coach/defensive line – John Mitchell; Offensive coaches: Offensive coordinator – Todd Haley; Quarterbacks – Randy Fichtner; Running backs – James Saxon; Wide receivers – Richard Mann; Tight ends – James Daniel; Offensive line – Mike Munchak; Offensive assistant – Shaun Sarrett | Defensive coaches: Defensive coordinator – Keith Butler; Inside linebackers – Jerry Olsavsky; Outside linebackers – Joey Porter; Defensive backs – Carnell Lake; Defensive assistant – Steve Meyer; Special teams coaches: Special teams coordinator – Danny Smith; Strength and conditioning: Strength and conditioning – Garrett Giemont; Conditioning assistant – Marcel Pastoor |

== Final roster ==
2016 Pittsburgh Steelers roster
| Quarterbacks (QB): 3 Landry Jones; 18 Zach Mettenberger; 7 Ben Roethlisberger; Running backs (RB): 26 Le'Veon Bell; 45 Roosevelt Nix FB; 33 Fitzgerald Toussaint; 34 DeAngelo Williams; Wide receivers (WR): 15 Demarcus Ayers; 84 Antonio Brown; 14 Sammie Coates; 83 Cobi Hamilton; 88 Darrius Heyward-Bey; 17 Eli Rogers; Tight ends (TE): 89 Ladarius Green; 85 Xavier Grimble; 81 Jesse James; 82 David Johnson | Offensive linemen (OL): 66 David DeCastro G; 67 B. J. Finney G/C; 73 Ramon Foster G; 77 Marcus Gilbert T; 74 Chris Hubbard T; 69 Brian Mihalik T; 53 Maurkice Pouncey C; 78 Alejandro Villanueva T; Defensive linemen (DL): 79 Javon Hargrave NT; 90 Ricardo Mathews DE; 62 Johnny Maxey DE; 93 Daniel McCullers NT; 91 Stephon Tuitt; 96 L. T. Walton DE | Linebackers (LB): 56 Anthony Chickillo OLB; 48 Bud Dupree OLB; 54 L. J. Fort ILB; 92 James Harrison OLB; 95 Jarvis Jones OLB; 44 Tyler Matakevich ILB; 55 Arthur Moats OLB; 50 Ryan Shazier ILB; 94 Lawrence Timmons ILB; 98 Vince Williams ILB; Defensive backs (DB): 25 Artie Burns CB; 31 Ross Cockrell CB; 37 Jordan Dangerfield FS; 28 Sean Davis SS; 22 William Gay CB; 24 Justin Gilbert CB; 21 Robert Golden SS; 23 Mike Mitchell FS; 20 Al-Hajj Shabazz CB; Special teams (ST): 4 Jordan Berry P; 9 Chris Boswell K; 60 Greg Warren LS | Practice squad: 38 Brandon Brown-Dukes RB; 35 Brandon Dixon CB; 71 Matt Feiler T; 42 Jacob Hagen FS; 40 Mike Hilton CB; 99 Caushaud Lyons DE; 76 Keavon Milton T; 41 Shaquille Riddick OLB; 39 Dreamius Smith RB; 16 Marcus Tucker WR; Reserve: 57 Kevin Anderson OLB (IR); 10 Martavis Bryant WR (Susp.); 27 Senquez Golson CB (IR); 68 Ryan Harris T (IR); 65 Jerald Hawkins T (IR); 97 Cameron Heyward DE (IR); 51 Steven Johnson ILB (IR); 64 Cole Manhart G (IR); 80 Canaan Severin WR (IR); 29 Shamarko Thomas SS (IR); 61 Valerian Ume-Ezeoke C (IR); 72 Cody Wallace C (IR); 11 Markus Wheaton WR (IR); Rookies in italics 53 active, 13 reserve, 10 practice squad |

== Schedule ==
=== Preseason ===
The Steelers' preseason opponents and schedule was announced on April 7. Dates and times were announced on April 14.

| Week | Date | Opponent | Result | Record | Venue | Recap |
|---|---|---|---|---|---|---|
| 1 | August 12 | Detroit Lions | **L** 17–30 | 0–1 | Heinz Field | Recap |
| 2 | August 18 | Philadelphia Eagles | **L** 0–17 | 0–2 | Heinz Field | Recap |
| 3 | August 26 | at New Orleans Saints | **W** 27–14 | 1–2 | Mercedes-Benz Superdome | Recap |
| 4 | September 1 | at Carolina Panthers | **L** 6–18 | 1–3 | Bank of America Stadium | Recap |

=== Regular season ===
The Steelers' regular season schedule was announced on April 14.

| Week | Date | Opponent | Result | Record | Venue | Recap |
|---|---|---|---|---|---|---|
| 1 | September 12 | at Washington Redskins | **W** 38–16 | 1–0 | FedExField | Recap |
| 2 | September 18 | **Cincinnati Bengals** | **W** 24–16 | 2–0 | Heinz Field | Recap |
| 3 | September 25 | at Philadelphia Eagles | **L** 3–34 | 2–1 | Lincoln Financial Field | Recap |
| 4 | October 2 | Kansas City Chiefs | **W** 43–14 | 3–1 | Heinz Field | Recap |
| 5 | October 9 | New York Jets | **W** 31–13 | 4–1 | Heinz Field | Recap |
| 6 | October 16 | at Miami Dolphins | **L** 15–30 | 4–2 | Hard Rock Stadium | Recap |
| 7 | October 23 | New England Patriots | **L** 16–27 | 4–3 | Heinz Field | Recap |
| 8 | Bye | | | | | |
| 9 | November 6 | at **Baltimore Ravens** | **L** 14–21 | 4–4 | M&T Bank Stadium | Recap |
| 10 | November 13 | Dallas Cowboys | **L** 30–35 | 4–5 | Heinz Field | Recap |
| 11 | November 20 | at **Cleveland Browns** | **W** 24–9 | 5–5 | FirstEnergy Stadium | Recap |
| 12 | November 24 | at Indianapolis Colts | **W** 28–7 | 6–5 | Lucas Oil Stadium | Recap |
| 13 | December 4 | New York Giants | **W** 24–14 | 7–5 | Heinz Field | Recap |
| 14 | December 11 | at Buffalo Bills | **W** 27–20 | 8–5 | New Era Field | Recap |
| 15 | December 18 | at **Cincinnati Bengals** | **W** 24–20 | 9–5 | Paul Brown Stadium | Recap |
| 16 | December 25 | **Baltimore Ravens** | **W** 31–27 | 10–5 | Heinz Field | Recap |
| 17 | January 1 | **Cleveland Browns** | **W** 27–24 (OT) | 11–5 | Heinz Field | Recap |

Note: Intra-division opponents are in bold text.

=== Postseason ===
| Round | Date | Opponent (seed) | Result | Record | Venue | Recap |
|---|---|---|---|---|---|---|
| Wild Card | January 8 | Miami Dolphins (6) | **W** 30–12 | 1–0 | Heinz Field | Recap |
| Divisional | January 15 | at Kansas City Chiefs (2) | **W** 18–16 | 2–0 | Arrowhead Stadium | Recap |
| AFC Championship | January 22 | at New England Patriots (1) | **L** 17–36 | 2–1 | Gillette Stadium | Recap |

== Game summaries ==
=== Regular season ===
==== Week 1: at Washington Redskins ====
Week One: Pittsburgh Steelers at Washington Redskins – Game summary

| Quarter | 1 | 2 | 3 | 4 | Total |
|---|---|---|---|---|---|
| Steelers | 0 | 14 | 10 | 14 | 38 |
| Redskins | 6 | 0 | 3 | 7 | 16 |

at FedExField, Landover, Maryland

- Date: September 12
- Game time: 7:10 p.m. EDT
- Game weather: 79 °F (26 °C), clear
- Game attendance: 79,124
- Referee: Craig Wrolstad
- TV announcers (ESPN): Sean McDonough, Jon Gruden and Lisa Salters
- Recap, Gamebook

Game information

First quarter

- WAS – Dustin Hopkins 31-yard field goal, 5:56. Redskins 3–0. Drive: 9 plays, 54 yards, 3:24.
- WAS – Dustin Hopkins 40-yard field goal, 1:08. Redskins 6–0. Drive: 5 plays, 14 yards, 2:38.

Second quarter

- PIT – Antonio Brown 29-yard pass from Ben Roethlisberger (Chris Boswell kick), 10:10. Steelers 7–6. Drive: 11 plays, 75 yards, 5:58.
- PIT – Eli Rogers 3-yard pass from Ben Roethlisberger (Chris Boswell kick), 0:27. Steelers 14–6. Drive: 14 plays, 67 yards, 5:52.

Third quarter

- PIT – Chris Boswell 46-yard field goal, 11:18. Steelers 17–6. Drive: 8 plays, 47 yards, 3:42.
- PIT – Antonio Brown 26-yard pass from Ben Roethlisberger (Chris Boswell kick), 7:01. Steelers 24–6. Drive: 5 plays, 75 yards, 2:04.
- WAS – Dustin Hopkins 34-yard field goal, 2:01. Steelers 24–9. Drive: 9 plays, 52 yards, 5:00.

Fourth quarter

- WAS – Chris Thompson 1-yard run (Dustin Hopkins kick), 13:01. Steelers 24–16. Drive: 7 plays, 77 yards, 2:18.
- PIT – DeAngelo Williams 15-yard run (Chris Boswell kick), 5:48. Steelers 31–16. Drive: 13 plays, 73 yards, 7:13.
- PIT – DeAngelo Williams 6-yard run (Chris Boswell kick), 1:54. Steelers 38–16. Drive: 6 plays, 45 yards, 2:23.

Top passers

- PIT – Ben Roethlisberger – 27/37, 300 yards, 3 TD, INT
- WAS – Kirk Cousins – 30/43, 329 yards, 2 INT

Top rushers

- PIT – DeAngelo Williams – 26 rushes, 143 yards, 2 TD
- WAS – Matt Jones – 7 rushes, 24 yards

Top receivers

- PIT – Antonio Brown – 8 receptions, 126 yards, 2 TD
- WAS – DeSean Jackson – 6 receptions, 102 yards

The Steelers opened their 2016 season on the road against the Redskins. In the first quarter, the Redskins got on the board jumping out to a 6–0 lead with two field goals kicked by Dustin Hopkins from 31 and 40 yards out. In the second quarter it was all Steelers as they jumped out to leads of 7–6 and 14–6 at halftime when Ben Roethlisberger found Antonio Brown and Eli Rogers on 29-yard and 3-yard touchdown passes. After the break, the Steelers moved ahead 24–6 when Chris Boswell nailed a 46-yard field goal while Roethlisberger found Brown on a 26-yard touchdown pass. The Skins tried to rally later on in the quarter, but could only get away with a 34-yard field goal from Hopkins making the score 24–9. Though in the fourth quarter, they would eventually pull within 8 when Chris Thompson ran for a 1-yard touchdown making the score 24–16. Later on in the quarter, the Steelers sealed the game when DeAngelo Williams ran for two touchdowns from 15 and 6 yards out to make the final score 38–16.

With the win, the Steelers started their season 1–0.

==== Week 2: vs. Cincinnati Bengals ====
Week Two: Cincinnati Bengals at Pittsburgh Steelers – Game summary

| Quarter | 1 | 2 | 3 | 4 | Total |
|---|---|---|---|---|---|
| Bengals | 3 | 3 | 3 | 7 | 16 |
| Steelers | 7 | 3 | 7 | 7 | 24 |

at Heinz Field, Pittsburgh, Pennsylvania

- Date: September 18
- Game time: 1:00 pm. EDT
- Game weather: 72 °F (22 °C), Cloudy
- Game attendance: 65,072
- Referee: Pete Morelli
- TV announcers (CBS): Ian Eagle, Dan Fouts and Evan Washburn
- Recap, Gamebook

Game information

First quarter

- PIT – Xavier Grimble 20-yard pass from Ben Roethlisberger (Chris Boswell kick), 3:46. Steelers 7–0. Drive: 5 plays, 66 yards, 1:43.
- CIN – Mike Nugent 25-yard field goal, 0:23. Steelers 7–3. Drive: 8 plays, 68 yards, 3:23.

Second quarter

- PIT – Chris Boswell 49-yard field goal, 4:10. Steelers 10–3. Drive: 4 plays, 6 yards, 0:55.
- CIN – Mike Nugent 33-yard field goal, 0:00. Steelers 10–6. Drive: 8 plays, 53 yards, 0:48.

Third quarter

- PIT – Jesse James 9-yard pass from Ben Roethlisberger (Chris Boswell kick), 6:16. Steelers 17–6. Drive: 7 plays, 91 yards, 3:20.
- CIN – Mike Nugent 21-yard field goal, 2:10. Steelers 17–9. Drive: 10 plays, 72 yards, 4:06.

Fourth quarter

- PIT – DeAngelo Williams 4-yard pass from Ben Roethlisberger (Chris Boswell kick), 6:48. Steelers 24–9. Drive: 12 plays, 68 yards, 6:54.
- CIN – Giovani Bernard 25-yard pass from Andy Dalton (Mike Nugent kick), 3:25. Steelers 24–16. Drive: 8 plays, 75 yards, 3:23.

Top passers

- CIN – Andy Dalton – 31/54, 366 yards, 1 TD
- PIT – Ben Roethlisberger – 19/37, 259 yards, 3 TD, 2 INT

Top rushers

- CIN – Jeremy Hill – 11 carries, 22 yards
- PIT – DeAngelo Williams – 32 carries, 94 yards

Top receivers

- CIN – Giovani Bernard – 9 receptions, 100 yards, 1 TD
- PIT – Antonio Brown – 4 receptions, 39 yards

The Steelers played their first home game of the year against the division rival Bengals in a rematch of the 2015 AFC wild card game. In the first quarter, the Steelers struck first when Ben Roethlisberger found Xavier Grimble on a 20-yard touchdown pass for a 7–0 lead. The Bengals came within 4 later on in the quarter when Mike Nugent kicked a 25-yard field goal for a 7–3 game. In the second quarter, the Steelers increased their lead when Chris Boswell kicked a 49-yard field goal to make it 10–3. The Bengals came within 4 again when Nugent kicked a 33-yard field goal to make it 10–6 at halftime. In the third quarter, the Steelers moved ahead by double digits when Roethlisberger found Jesse James on a 9-yard touchdown pass to make it 17–6. The Bengals reduced the lead when Nugent kicked another field goal from 21 yards out to make it 17–9. In the fourth quarter, the Steelers pulled away as Roethlisberger found De'Angelo Williams on a 4-yard touchdown pass to make it 24–9. Though the Bengals wrapped up the scoring of the game when Andy Dalton found Giovani Bernard on a 25-yard touchdown pass to make the final score 24–16.

With the win, the Steelers started 2–0 for the first time since 2010.

==== Week 3: at Philadelphia Eagles ====
Week Three: Pittsburgh Steelers at Philadelphia Eagles – Game summary

| Quarter | 1 | 2 | 3 | 4 | Total |
|---|---|---|---|---|---|
| Steelers | 0 | 3 | 0 | 0 | 3 |
| Eagles | 3 | 10 | 21 | 0 | 34 |

at Lincoln Financial Field, Philadelphia, Pennsylvania

- Date: September 25
- Game time: 4:25 pm. EDT
- Game weather: 73 °F (23 °C), sunny
- Game attendance: 69,596
- Referee: Brad Allen
- TV announcers (CBS): Jim Nantz, Phil Simms and Tracy Wolfson
- Recap, Gamebook

Game information

First quarter

- PHI – Caleb Sturgis 29-yard field goal, 5:29. Eagles 3–0. Drive: 7 plays, 63 yards, 3:20.

Second quarter

- PHI – Jordan Matthews 12-yard pass from Carson Wentz (Caleb Sturgis kick), 12:04. Eagles 10–0. Drive: 12 plays, 82 yards, 6:06.
- PIT – Chris Boswell 40-yard field goal, 7:40. Eagles 10-3Drive: 8 plays, 61 yards, 4:24.
- PHI – Caleb Sturgis 38-yard field goal, 2:25. Eagles 13–3. Drive: 10 plays, 58 yards, 5:15.

Third quarter

- PHI – Darren Sproles 73-yard pass from Carson Wentz (Caleb Sturgis kick), 12:54. Eagles 20-3. Drive: 3 plays, 75 yards, 2:06.
- PHI – Wendell Smallwood 1-yard run (Caleb Sturgis kick), 5:45. Eagles 27-3. Drive: 7 plays, 67 yards, 4:58.
- PHI – Kenjon Barner 8-yard run (Caleb Sturgis kick), 1:52. Eagles 34-4 Drive: 3 plays, 41 yards, 1:24.

Fourth quarter

- No scoring plays

Top passers

- PIT – Ben Roethlisberger – 24/44, 257 yards,INT
- PHI – Carson Wentz – 23/31, 301 yards, 2 TD

Top rushers

- PIT – DeAngelo Williams – 8 rushes, 21 yards
- PHI – Wendell Smallwood – 17 rushes, 79 yards, TD

Top receivers

- PIT – Antonio Brown – 12 receptions, 140 yards
- PHI – Darren Sproles – 6 receptions, 128 yards, TD

The Steelers traveled cross-state to take on the Eagles. The Eagles scored first with a 29-yarder from Caleb Sturgis, then Jordan Matthews scored a touchdown. The Steelers then got their first and only score of the game, followed by another Eagles field goal to make it 13-3 heading into the half. The Eagles then got three straight touchdowns, all scored by a running back. It was 34-3 heading into the fourth quarter, and the score stayed that way for the rest of the game

With this game, the Steelers suffered their first loss of the season, their 8th loss in Philadelphia since 1965, falling to 2-1

==== Week 4: vs. Kansas City Chiefs ====
Week Four: Kansas City Chiefs at Pittsburgh Steelers – Game summary

| Quarter | 1 | 2 | 3 | 4 | Total |
|---|---|---|---|---|---|
| Chiefs | 0 | 0 | 0 | 14 | 14 |
| Steelers | 22 | 7 | 7 | 7 | 43 |

at Heinz Field, Pittsburgh, Pennsylvania

- Date: October 2
- Game time: 8:30 pm. EDT
- Game weather: 59 °F (15 °C), rain
- Game attendance: 61,278
- Referee: Ronald Torbert
- TV announcers (NBC): Al Michaels, Cris Collinsworth and Michele Tafoya
- Recap, Gamebook

Game information

First quarter

- PIT – Darrius Heyward-Bey 31-yard pass from Ben Roethlisberger (Ben Roethlisberger–Markus Wheaton pass), 7:27. Steelers 8–0. Drive: 3 plays, 32 yards, 1:23.
- PIT – Antonio Brown 4-yard pass from Ben Roethlisberger (Chris Boswell kick), 5:10. Steelers 15–0. Drive: 1 play, 4 yards, 0:04.
- PIT – Antonio Brown 38-yard pass from Ben Roethlisberger (Chris Boswell kick), 1:20. Steelers 22–0. Drive: 2 plays, 40 yards, 0:47.

Second quarter

- PIT – Jesse James 9-yard pass from Ben Roethlisberger (Chris Boswell kick), 0:44. Steelers 29–0. Drive: 10 plays, 80 yards, 3:44.

Third quarter

- PIT – Markus Wheaton 30-yard pass from Ben Roethlisberger (Chris Boswell kick), 11:19. Steelers 36–0. Drive: 6 plays, 75 yards, 3:41.

Fourth quarter

- KC – Tyreek Hill 9-yard pass from Alex Smith (Cairo Santos kick), 11:11. Steelers 36–7. Drive: 7 plays, 47 yards, 2:17.
- PIT – DeAngelo Williams 2-yard run (Chris Boswell kick), 7:22. Steelers 43–7. Drive: 8 plays, 75 yards, 3:49.
- KC – Travis Kelce 3-yard pass from Alex Smith (Cairo Santos kick), 0:04. Steelers 43–14. Drive: 7 plays, 62 yards, 3:41.

Top passers

- KC – Alex Smith – 30/50, 287 yards, 2 TD, INT
- PIT – Ben Roethlisberger – 22/27, 300 yards, 5 TD

Top rushers

- KC – Spencer Ware – 13 rushes, 82 yards
- PIT – Le'Veon Bell – 18 rushes, 144 yards

Top receivers

- KC – Jeremy Maclin – 5 receptions, 78 yards
- PIT – Sammie Coates – 6 receptions, 79 yards

After a horrifying road loss, the Steelers returned home for a Sunday Night duel against the Chiefs. Through the first half, it was all Steelers starting in the first quarter when Ben Roethlisberger found Darrius Heyward-Bey on a 31-yard touchdown pass with a successful two-point conversion to make it 8–0. This was followed up with Roethlisberger finding Antonio Brown on 2 consecutive touchdown passes: from 4 and 38 yards out to make the score 22–0. In the second quarter, they made the halftime score 29–0 when Roethlisberger found Jesse James on a 9-yard touchdown pass. In the third quarter, Markus Wheaton caught a 30-yard touchdown pass from Roethlisberger to make the score 36–0. In the fourth quarter, the Chiefs finally got on the board when Alex Smith found Tyreek Hill on a 10-yard touchdown pass to make it 36–7. Though the Steelers pretty much sealed the game when De'Angelo Williams ran for a 2-yard touchdown to make it 43–7. The Chiefs then wrapped up the scoring of the game when Smith found Travis Kelce on a 3-yard touchdown pass to make the final score 43–14.

With the win, the Steelers improved to 3–1. With the Ravens' loss to the Raiders earlier in the day, they move into a tie at the top of the AFC North.

The Steelers set a franchise record with 22 total points scored in the first quarter. The team also snapped their streak of consecutive games with at least a giveaway.

Roethlisberger who had thrown 6 touchdown passes and 4 interceptions through the first 3 games had thrown 5 touchdown passes and no interceptions in this game alone.

==== Week 5: vs. New York Jets ====
Week Five: New York Jets at Pittsburgh Steelers – Game summary

| Quarter | 1 | 2 | 3 | 4 | Total |
|---|---|---|---|---|---|
| Jets | 3 | 10 | 0 | 0 | 13 |
| Steelers | 7 | 7 | 3 | 14 | 31 |

at Heinz Field, Pittsburgh, Pennsylvania

- Date: October 9
- Game time: 1:00 pm. EDT
- Game weather: 57 °F (14 °C), partly cloudy
- Game attendance: 66,385
- Referee: John Parry
- TV announcers (CBS): Ian Eagle, Dan Fouts and Evan Washburn
- Recap, Gamebook

Game information

First quarter

- NYJ – Nick Folk 35-yard field goal, 11:45. Jets 3–0. Drive: 8 plays, 58 yards, 3:15.
- PIT – Sammie Coates 72-yard pass from Ben Roethlisberger (Chris Boswell kick), 10:16. Steelers 7–3. Drive: 3 plays, 75 yards, 1:29.

Second quarter

- NYJ – Nick Folk 48-yard field goal, 11:07. Steelers 7–6. Drive: 9 plays, 59 yards, 4:40.
- NYJ – Brandon Marshall 15-yard pass from Ryan Fitzpatrick (Nick Folk kick), 2:06. Jets 13–7. Drive: 7 plays, 69 yards, 3:48.
- PIT – Jesse James 1-yard pass from Ben Roethlisberger (Chris Boswell kick), 0:41. Steelers 14–13. Drive: 11 plays, 75 yards, 1:25.

Third quarter

- PIT – Chris Boswell 47-yard field goal, 10:23. Steelers 17–13. Drive: 4 plays, 2 yards, 0:58.

Fourth quarter

- PIT – Antonio Brown 5-yard pass from Ben Roethlisberger (Chris Boswell kick), 14:55. Steelers 24–13. Drive: 9 plays, 80 yards, 4:12.
- PIT – Sammie Coates 5-yard pass from Ben Roethlisberger (Chris Boswell kick), 1:46. Steelers 31–13. Drive: 12 plays, 79 yards, 5:43.

Top passers

- NYJ – Ryan Fitzpatrick – 25/38, 255 yards, TD
- PIT – Ben Roethlisberger – 34/47, 380 yards, 4 TD

Top rushers

- NYJ – Matt Forte – 12 rushes, 53 yards
- PIT – Le'Veon Bell – 20 rushes, 66 yards

Top receivers

- NYJ – Brandon Marshall – 8 receptions, 114 yards, TD
- PIT – Sammie Coates – 6 receptions, 139 yards, 2 TD

The Steelers stayed home for a game against the Jets. In the first quarter, the Jets took an early 3–0 lead when Nick Folk kicked a 30-yard field goal. Later on, the Steelers took the lead when Ben Roethlisberger found Sammie Coates for a 72-yard touchdown pass to make it 7–3. The Jets scored 10 straight points in the second quarter: Folk kicked a 48-yard field goal to come within a point, 7–6. This would be followed by Ryan Fitzpatrick finding Brandon Marshall on a 15-yard touchdown pass to make it 13–7. The Steelers wrapped up the scoring of the half when Roethlisberger found Jesse James on a 1-yard touchdown pass to make it 14–13 at halftime. In the second half it was all Steelers. Starting in the third quarter, Chris Boswell put the team up by 4 with a 47-yard field goal to make it 17–13. In the fourth quarter, they would score 2 touchdowns: Roethlisberger found Antonio Brown on a 5-yard pass and then Coates on another 5-yard pass to make the score 24–13 and the eventual final score 31–13.

With the win, the Steelers improved to 4–1. With the Ravens' loss to the Redskins, the team is also now in outright first place in the AFC North.

This would be the final game the Steelers would wear their bumblebee uniforms.

==== Week 6: at Miami Dolphins ====
Week Six: Pittsburgh Steelers at Miami Dolphins – Game summary

| Quarter | 1 | 2 | 3 | 4 | Total |
|---|---|---|---|---|---|
| Steelers | 8 | 0 | 0 | 7 | 15 |
| Dolphins | 3 | 13 | 7 | 7 | 30 |

at Hard Rock Stadium, Miami Gardens, Florida

- Date: October 16
- Game time: 1:00 pm. EDT
- Game weather: 81 °F (27 °C), partly sunny
- Game attendance: 65,351
- Referee: Ed Hochuli
- TV announcers (CBS): Spero Dedes and Solomon Wilcots
- Recap, Gamebook

Game information

First quarter

- MIA – Andrew Franks 30-yard field goal, 8:34. Dolphins 3–0. Drive: 9 plays, 53 yards, 3:39.
- PIT – Darrius Heyward-Bey 60-yard run (Ben Roethlisberger–Le'Veon Bell pass), 5:39. Steelers 8–3. Drive: 6 plays, 75 yards, 2:55.

Second quarter

- MIA – Andrew Franks 23-yard field goal, 8:18. Steelers 8–6. Drive: 12 plays, 85 yards, 7:08.
- MIA – Andrew Franks 30-yard field goal, 5:23. Dolphins 9–8. Drive: 4 plays, 1 yard, 2:43.
- MIA – Damien Williams 1-yard run (Andrew Franks kick), 0:21. Dolphins 16–8. Drive: 9 plays, 71 yards, 2:26.

Third quarter

- MIA – Jay Ajayi 1-yard run (Andrew Franks kick), 1:39. Dolphins 23–8. Drive: 6 plays, 52 yards, 3:31.

Fourth quarter

- PIT – Cobi Hamilton 23-yard pass from Ben Roethlisberger (Chris Boswell kick), 1:02. Dolphins 23–15. Drive: 10 plays, 97 yards, 3:18.
- MIA – Jay Ajayi 62-yard run (Andrew Franks kick), 0:50. Dolphins 30–15. Drive: 1 play, 62 yards, 0:12.

Top passers

- PIT – Ben Roethlisberger – 19/34, 189 yards, TD, 2 INT
- MIA – Ryan Tannehill – 24/32, 252 yards

Top rushers

- PIT – Darrius Heyward-Bey – 1 rush, 60 yards, TD
- MIA – Jay Ajayi – 25 rushes, 204 yards, 2 TD

Top receivers

- PIT – Le'Veon Bell – 6 receptions, 55 yards
- MIA – Jarvis Landry – 7 receptions, 91 yards

The Steelers traveled to Miami to take on the Dolphins. In the first quarter, the Dolphins struck first when Andrew Franks kicked a 30-yard field goal for a 3–0 lead. The Steelers got on the board later on in the quarter taking the lead when Darrius Heyward-Bey ran for a 60-yard touchdown (with a successful 2-point conversion) for an 8–3 game. In the second quarter, it was all Dolphins as they closed out the half by first coming within 2 when Franks kicked a 23-yard field goal to make the score 8–6. The Dolphins eventually took the lead back when Franks kicked another 30-yard field goal for a 9–8 game. They would move ahead by a touchdown when Damien Williams ran for one from a yard out to take a 16–8 lead at halftime. In the third quarter, the Dolphins got back to work when Jay Ajayi ran for a 1-yard touchdown to make the score 23–8 for the only score of the period. The Steelers tried to rally when Ben Roethlisberger found Cobi Hamilton on a 23-yard touchdown pass shortening their deficit to 8, 23–15. Though the Steelers' rush defense stalled with less than a minute left in the game and Ajayi ran for a 62-yard touchdown to seal the game with the final score 30–15.

With the loss, the Steelers fell to 4–2. Ben Roethlisberger would be knocked out of the game due to injury in the second quarter. Though he played in the second half.

The Steelers still remained in first place with the Ravens' loss to the Giants.

==== Week 7: vs. New England Patriots ====
Week Seven: New England Patriots at Pittsburgh Steelers – Game summary

| Quarter | 1 | 2 | 3 | 4 | Total |
|---|---|---|---|---|---|
| Patriots | 7 | 7 | 6 | 7 | 27 |
| Steelers | 0 | 10 | 3 | 3 | 16 |

at Heinz Field, Pittsburgh, Pennsylvania

- Date: October 23
- Game time: 4:25 pm. EDT
- Game weather: 63 °F (17 °C), sunny
- Game attendance: 66,009
- Referee: Craig Wrolstad
- TV announcers (CBS): Jim Nantz, Phil Simms and Tracy Wolfson
- Recap, Gamebook

Game information

First quarter

- NE – James White 19-yard pass from Tom Brady (Stephen Gostkowski kick), 2:55. Patriots 7–0. Drive: 13 plays, 80 yards, 7:23.

Second quarter

- NE – LeGarrette Blount 3-yard run (Stephen Gostkowski kick), 10:58. Patriots 14–0. Drive: 11 plays, 84 yards, 4:46.
- PIT – Darrius Heyward-Bey 14-yard pass from Landry Jones (Chris Boswell kick), 9:02. Patriots 14–7. Drive: 5 plays, 71 yards, 1:56.
- PIT – Chris Boswell 32-yard field goal, 0:02. Patriots 14–10. Drive: 10 plays, 66 yards, 1:45.

Third quarter

- PIT – Chris Boswell 46-yard field goal, 8:44. Patriots 14–13. Drive: 9 plays, 48 yards, 4:49.
- NE – Rob Gronkowski 32-yard pass from Tom Brady (kick failed, wide right), 6:19. Patriots 20–13. Drive: 5 plays, 75 yards, 2:25.

Fourth quarter

- PIT – Chris Boswell 44-yard field goal, 14:44. Patriots 20–16. Drive: 12 plays, 42 yards, 6:35.
- NE – LeGarrette Blount 5-yard run (Stephen Gostkowski kick), 11:44. Patriots 27–16. Drive: 6 plays, 75 yards, 3:00.

Top passers

- NE – Tom Brady – 19/26, 222 yards, 2 TD
- PIT – Landry Jones – 29/47, 281 yards, TD, INT

Top rushers

- NE – LeGarrette Blount – 24 rushes, 127 yards, 2 TD
- PIT – Le'Veon Bell – 21 rushes, 81 yards

Top receivers

- NE – Rob Gronkowski – 4 receptions, 93 yards, TD
- PIT – Antonio Brown – 7 receptions, 106 yards

The Steelers went back home for another showdown with the Patriots. This game is notable for being the very first game that QB Ben Roethlisberger would miss out on against the Patriots. In the first quarter, The Patriots scored first when Tom Brady found James White on a 19-yard touchdown pass for a 7–0 lead for the only score of the period. In the second quarter, they increased their lead when LaGarrette Blount ran for a 3-yard touchdown to make it 14–0. The Steelers got on the board later on in the quarter when Landry Jones found Darrius Heyward-Bey on a 14-yard touchdown pass for a 14–7 game. The Steelers closed out the scoring of the first half when Chris Boswell kicked a 32-yard field goal for a 14–10 game at halftime. In the third quarter, the Steelers went back to work as Boswell kicked another field goal to get his team within 1, 14–13 from 46 yards out. The Pats pulled away later on when Brady found Rob Gronkowski on a 36-yard touchdown pass (with a failed PAT) for a 20–13 game. In the fourth quarter, the Steelers came within 4 again when Boswell made a 44-yard field goal for a 20–16 game. But the Pats sealed the game after Blount ran for a 5-yard touchdown and the eventual final score of 27–16.

With the loss, the Steelers went into their bye week at 4–3. Regardless, due to the Ravens' loss to the Jets, they still remain in first place in the AFC North. The team dropped to 0–1 on the season without Roethlisberger as a starter and their seven-game home winning streak was snapped.

==== Week 9: at Baltimore Ravens ====
Week Nine: Pittsburgh Steelers at Baltimore Ravens – Game summary

| Quarter | 1 | 2 | 3 | 4 | Total |
|---|---|---|---|---|---|
| Steelers | 0 | 0 | 0 | 14 | 14 |
| Ravens | 7 | 3 | 3 | 8 | 21 |

at M&T Bank Stadium, Baltimore, Maryland

- Date: November 6
- Game time: 1:00 pm. EST
- Game weather: 65 °F (18 °C), partly cloudy
- Game attendance: 71,286
- Referee: John Hussey
- TV announcers (CBS): Ian Eagle, Rich Gannon and Evan Washburn
- Recap, Gamebook

Game information

First quarter

- BAL – Mike Wallace 95-yard pass from Joe Flacco (Justin Tucker kick), 1:07. Ravens 7–0. Drive: 2 plays, 96 yards, 0:43.

Second quarter

- BAL – Justin Tucker 49-yard field goal, 0:03. Ravens 10–0. Drive: 9 plays, 43 yards, 1:41.

Third quarter

- BAL – Justin Tucker 42-yard field goal, 4:50. Ravens 13–0. Drive: 4 plays, 8 yards, 1:30.

Fourth quarter

- BAL – Chris Moore 14-yard return of blocked punt (Joe Flacco–Steve Smith Sr. pass), 13:36. Ravens 21–0.
- PIT – Antonio Brown 23-yard pass from Ben Roethlisberger (Chris Boswell kick), 8:38. Ravens 21–7. Drive: 9 plays, 75 yards, 4:58.
- PIT – Ben Roethlisberger 4-yard run (Chris Boswell kick), 0:48. Ravens 21–14. Drive: 7 plays, 65 yards, 1:20.

Top passers

- PIT – Ben Roethlisberger – 23/45, 264 yards, TD, INT
- BAL – Joe Flacco – 18/30, 241 yards, TD, INT

Top rushers

- PIT – Le'Veon Bell – 14 rushes, 32 yards
- BAL – Terrance West – 15 rushes, 21 yards

Top receivers

- PIT – Eli Rogers – 6 receptions, 103 yards
- BAL – Mike Wallace – 6 receptions, 124 yards, TD

Coming off of the bye week, the Steelers traveled to Baltimore to take on their division rival Ravens. The game received much hype, including QB Ben Roethlisberger returning from injury. Through the first half it was all Ravens when Joe Flacco found Mike Wallace on a 95-yard touchdown pass to move up 7–0 in the first quarter. This was followed by Justin Tucker's 49-yard field goal in the second to make it 10–0 at halftime. In the third quarter, the Ravens went back to work as Tucker went for a 42-yard field goal to make it 13–0. In the fourth quarter, Chris Moore blocked a punt and returned it 14 yards for a touchdown with a (successful two-point conversion) to make it 21–0. Later on in the game, the Steelers finally got on the board as Roethlisberger found Antonio Brown on a 23-yard touchdown pass making the score 21–7. They wrapped up the scoring later on when Roethlisberger ran for a touchdown himself from 4 yards out making the final score 21–14.

With their third straight loss, the Steelers fell to 4–4 and move into a tie with the Ravens for the lead in the AFC North. The loss was also the Steelers' fourth straight loss to the Ravens as well as the fourth straight year losing to their top division rivals in Baltimore. This would be Pittsburgh's last loss that came directly after a bye week until 2026.

==== Week 10: vs. Dallas Cowboys ====
Week Ten: Dallas Cowboys at Pittsburgh Steelers – Game summary

| Quarter | 1 | 2 | 3 | 4 | Total |
|---|---|---|---|---|---|
| Cowboys | 10 | 3 | 10 | 12 | 35 |
| Steelers | 12 | 3 | 3 | 12 | 30 |

at Heinz Field, Pittsburgh, Pennsylvania

- Date: November 13
- Game time: 4:25 pm. EST
- Game weather: 56 °F (13 °C), sunny
- Game attendance: 67,737
- Referee: Clete Blakeman
- TV announcers (Fox): Joe Buck, Troy Aikman and Erin Andrews
- Recap, Gamebook

Game information

First quarter

- PIT – Le'Veon Bell 2-yard pass from Ben Roethlisberger (pass failed), 9:54. Steelers 6–0. Drive: 8 plays, 38 yards, 3:51.
- DAL – Dan Bailey 37-yard field goal, 5:17. Steelers 6–3. Drive: 10 plays, 42 yards, 4:37.
- PIT – Eli Rogers 3-yard pass from Ben Roethlisberger (pass failed), 1:13. Steelers 12–3. Drive: 8 plays, 75 yards, 4:04.
- DAL – Ezekiel Elliott 83-yard pass from Dak Prescott (Dan Bailey kick), 0:12. Steelers 12–10. Drive: 2 plays, 75 yards, 1:01.

Second quarter

- DAL – Dan Bailey 53-yard field goal, 11:04. Cowboys 13–12. Drive: 6 plays, 25 yards, 3:24.
- PIT – Chris Boswell 39-yard field goal, 4:43. Steelers 15–13. Drive: 10 plays, 54 yards, 6:21.

Third quarter

- PIT – Chris Boswell 25-yard field goal, 13:10. Steelers 18–13. Drive: 7 plays, 68 yards, 1:50.
- DAL – Dan Bailey 46-yard field goal, 5:35. Steelers 18–16. Drive: 14 plays, 46 yards, 7:35.
- DAL – Dez Bryant 50-yard pass from Dak Prescott (Dan Bailey kick), 1:35. Cowboys 23–18. Drive: 3 plays, 49 yards, 1:48.

Fourth quarter

- PIT – Le'Veon Bell 1-yard run (pass failed), 7:51. Steelers 24–23. Drive: 6 plays, 46 yards, 3:05.
- DAL – Ezekiel Elliott 14-yard run (pass failed), 1:55. Cowboys 29–24. Drive: 10 plays, 75 yards, 5:56.
- PIT – Antonio Brown 15-yard pass from Ben Roethlisberger (pass failed), 0:42. Steelers 30–29. Drive: 5 plays, 75 yards, 1:13.
- DAL – Ezekiel Elliott 32-yard run (pass failed), 0:09. Cowboys 35–30. Drive: 5 plays, 75 yards, 0:33.

Top passers

- DAL – Dak Prescott – 22/32, 319 yards, 2 TD
- PIT – Ben Roethlisberger – 37/46, 408 yards, 3 TD

Top rushers

- DAL – Ezekiel Elliott – 21 rushes, 114 yards, 2 TD
- PIT – Le'Veon Bell – 17 rushes, 57 yards, TD

Top receivers

- DAL – Dez Bryant – 6 receptions, 116 yards, TD
- PIT – Antonio Brown – 14 receptions, 154 yards, TD

The Steelers traveled home to take on the Cowboys. They would draw first blood in the first quarter when Ben Roethlisberger threw a 2-yard touchdown pass to Le'Veon Bell (with a failed 2-point conversion) for a 6–0 lead. The Cowboys got on the board when Dan Bailey kicked a 37-yard field goal for a 6–3 game. The Steelers pulled away as Roethlisberger found Eli Rogers on a 3-yard touchdown pass for a 12–3 game. The Cowboys came within two points as Dak Prescott found Ezekiel Elliott on an 83-yard touchdown pass to make the score 12–10. In the second quarter, the Cowboys took the lead as Bailey kicked a 53-yard field goal for a 13–12 game. The Steelers wrapped up the scoring of the first half when Chris Boswell kicked a 39-yard field goal taking a 15–13 halftime lead. After the break, the Steelers went back to work as Boswell nailed a 25-yard field goal to move ahead by 5, 18–13. The Cowboys then scored on two consecutive drives: Bailey nailed a 46-yard field goal to make the score 18–16, and Prescott found Dez Bryant on a 50-yard touchdown pass to retake the lead 23–18. The Steelers retook the lead in the fourth quarter when Bell ran for a 1-yard touchdown (with a failed two-point conversion) to make the score 24–23. Though the Cowboys pushed back into the lead when Elliott ran for a 14-yard touchdown (with a failed 2-point conversion) to make the score 29–24, the Steelers moved back into the lead with Roethlisberger's 15-yard touchdown pass to Antonio Brown (with a failed two-point conversion) for a 30–29 game. However, the Boys were able to complete the comeback when Elliott ran for a 32-yard touchdown (with a failed two-point conversion) to make the final score 35–30.

With their fourth straight loss, the Steelers fell to 4–5 and second place in the AFC North.

==== Week 11: at Cleveland Browns ====
Week Eleven: Pittsburgh Steelers at Cleveland Browns – Game summary

| Quarter | 1 | 2 | 3 | 4 | Total |
|---|---|---|---|---|---|
| Steelers | 3 | 11 | 3 | 7 | 24 |
| Browns | 0 | 0 | 3 | 6 | 9 |

at FirstEnergy Stadium, Cleveland, Ohio

- Date: November 20
- Game time: 1:00 pm. EST
- Game weather: 36 °F (2 °C), cloudy
- Game attendance: 67,431
- Referee: Brad Allen
- TV announcers (CBS): Kevin Harlan and Rich Gannon
- Recap, Gamebook

Game information

First quarter

- PIT – Chris Boswell 32-yard field goal, 2:28. Steelers 3–0. Drive: 16 plays, 82 yards, 9:18.

Second quarter

- PIT – Chris Boswell 33-yard field goal, 4:43. Steelers 6–0. Drive: 16 plays, 68 yards, 9:28.
- PIT – Le'Veon Bell 1-yard run (Ben Roethlisberger–David Johnson pass), 0:00. Steelers 14–0. Drive: 11 plays, 59 yards, 1:51.

Third quarter

- CLE – Cody Parkey 24-yard field goal, 8:05. Steelers 14–3. Drive: 11 plays, 48 yards, 5:00.
- PIT – Chris Boswell 22-yard field goal, 0:03. Steelers 17–3. Drive: 15 plays, 71 yards, 8:02.

Fourth quarter

- CLE – Gary Barnidge 14-yard pass from Josh McCown (kick failed, wide right), 9:45. Steelers 17–9. Drive: 11 plays, 75 yards, 5:18.
- PIT – Javon Hargrave fumble recovery in the end zone (Chris Boswell kick), 3:36. Steelers 24–9.

Top passers

- PIT – Ben Roethlisberger – 23/36, 167 yards
- CLE – Cody Kessler – 7/14, 128 yards, INT

Top rushers

- PIT – Le'Veon Bell – 28 rushes, 146 yards, TD
- CLE – Josh McCown – 2 rushes, 11 yards

Top receivers

- PIT – Antonio Brown – 8 receptions, 76 yards
- CLE – Terrelle Pryor – 5 receptions, 97 yards

After a tough home game against the Cowboys, the Steelers traveled to Cleveland for Game 1 against the Browns. In the first half, it was all Steelers starting in the first quarter when Chris Boswell made a 32-yard field goal for a 3–0 lead. They would increase their lead in the second quarter when Boswell made a 33-yard field goal followed up by Le'Veon Bell running for a 1-yard touchdown with a successful two-point conversion to make it 6–0 and then 14–0 at halftime. In the third quarter, the Browns finally got on the board as Cody Parkey made a 24-yard field goal to make the score 14–3. The Steelers however pulled away as Boswell kicked a 22-yard field goal making it 17–3. In the fourth quarter, the Browns drew closer as backup QB Josh McCown threw a 14-yard touchdown pass to Gary Barnidge (with a failed PAT) to make the score 17–9. However, later on, the Steelers sealed the game when Javon Hargrave recovered a fumble in the end zone to make the final score 24–9.

With their four-game losing streak coming to a stop, the Steelers improved to 5–5. Also, they move back into a tie on top of the AFC North due to the Ravens' loss to the Cowboys.

The defense—which had only 13 sacks going into this game—managed to get eight in this game alone, as Cody Kessler and Josh McCown each got sacked four times.

==== Week 12: at Indianapolis Colts ====
Thanksgiving Day game

Week Twelve: Pittsburgh Steelers at Indianapolis Colts – Game summary

| Quarter | 1 | 2 | 3 | 4 | Total |
|---|---|---|---|---|---|
| Steelers | 14 | 7 | 0 | 7 | 28 |
| Colts | 0 | 7 | 0 | 0 | 7 |

at Lucas Oil Stadium, Indianapolis, Indiana

- Date: November 24
- Game time: 8:30 pm. EST
- Game weather: Played indoors (retractable roof closed)
- Game attendance: 66,583
- Referee: Walt Coleman
- TV announcers (NBC): Mike Tirico, Cris Collinsworth and Michele Tafoya
- Recap, Gamebook

Game information

First quarter

- PIT – Le'Veon Bell 5-yard run (Chris Boswell kick), 9:10. Steelers 7–0. Drive: 7 plays, 52 yards, 4:19.
- PIT – Antonio Brown 25-yard pass from Ben Roethlisberger (Chris Boswell kick), 1:06. Steelers 14–0. Drive: 7 plays, 58 yards, 3:02.

Second quarter

- IND – Donte Moncrief 5-yard pass from Scott Tolzien (Adam Vinatieri kick), 13:02. Steelers 14–7. Drive: 6 plays, 47 yards, 3:04.
- PIT – Antonio Brown 33-yard pass from Ben Roethlisberger (Chris Boswell kick), 9:00. Steelers 21–7. Drive: 7 plays, 75 yards, 4:02.

Third quarter

- No scoring plays

Fourth quarter

- PIT – Antonio Brown 22-yard pass from Ben Roethlisberger (Chris Boswell kick), 5:30. Steelers 28–7. Drive: 4 plays, 64 yards, 2:21.

Top passers

- PIT – Ben Roethlisberger – 14/20, 221 yards, 3 TD
- IND – Scott Tolzien – 22/36, 205 yards, TD, 2 INT

Top rushers

- PIT – Le'Veon Bell – 23 rushes, 120 yards, TD
- IND – Jordan Todman – 3 rushes, 37 yards

Top receivers

- PIT – Antonio Brown – 5 receptions, 91 yards, 3 TD
- IND – T. Y. Hilton – 3 receptions, 54 yards

After winning over the Browns, the Steelers traveled further west to take on the Colts in a rematch of 2015's 45–10 blowout win. The Steelers struck first in the first quarter when Le'Veon Bell ran for a 5-yard touchdown to take a 7–0 lead. This would be followed by Ben Roethlisberger finding Antonio Brown on a 25-yard touchdown pass later on in the quarter to make it 14–0. The Colts got on the board in the second quarter when QB Scott Tolzien, starting in place of the injured Andrew Luck, found Donte Moncrief on a 5-yard touchdown pass to make it 14–7. However, the Steelers pulled away as Roethlisberger found Brown again this time on a 33-yard touchdown pass for a 21–7 lead at halftime. After a scoreless third quarter, the Steelers sealed the game with the only points in the second half when Roethlisberger found Brown again this time on a 22-yard touchdown pass and the eventual final score of 28–7.

With the win, the Steelers improved to 6–5. Roethlisberger's record as a starter improved to 1–1 on Thanksgiving Day.

As of 2026, this is the last time the Steelers won a Thursday night game on the road.

==== Week 13: vs. New York Giants ====
Week Thirteen: New York Giants at Pittsburgh Steelers – Game summary

| Quarter | 1 | 2 | 3 | 4 | Total |
|---|---|---|---|---|---|
| Giants | 0 | 0 | 7 | 7 | 14 |
| Steelers | 5 | 9 | 7 | 3 | 24 |

at Heinz Field, Pittsburgh, Pennsylvania

- Date: December 4
- Game time: 4:25 pm. EST
- Game weather: 43 °F (6 °C), cloudy
- Game attendance: 65,825
- Referee: Terry McAulay
- TV announcers (Fox): Joe Buck, Troy Aikman and Erin Andrews
- Recap, Gamebook

Game information

First quarter

- PIT – Penalty on Ereck Flowers enforced in the end zone for a safety, 3:04. Steelers 2–0.
- PIT – Randy Bullock 44-yard field goal, 0:04. Steelers 5–0. Drive: 7 plays, 38 yards, 3:00.

Second quarter

- PIT – Antonio Brown 22-yard pass from Ben Roethlisberger (pass failed), 7:10. Steelers 11–0. Drive: 3 plays, 40 yards, 1:11.
- PIT – Randy Bullock 34-yard field goal, 0:24. Steelers 14–0. Drive: 15 plays, 64 yards, 5:52.

Third quarter

- NYG – Rashad Jennings 13-yard pass from Eli Manning (Robbie Gould kick), 6:30. Steelers 14–7. Drive: 2 plays, 17 yards, 0:42.
- PIT – Ladarius Green 20-yard pass from Ben Roethlisberger (Randy Bullock kick), 3:09. Steelers 21–7. Drive: 7 plays, 88 yards, 3:21.

Fourth quarter

- PIT – Randy Bullock 38-yard field goal, 1:39. Steelers 24–7. Drive: 11 plays, 48 yards, 5:17.
- NYG – Sterling Shepard 1-yard pass from Eli Manning (Robbie Gould kick), 0:26. Steelers 24–14. Drive: 5 plays, 52 yards, 1:13.

Top passers

- NYG – Eli Manning – 24/39, 195 yards, 2 TD, 2 INT
- PIT – Ben Roethlisberger – 24/36, 289 yards, 2 TD, INT

Top rushers

- NYG – Paul Perkins – 7 rushes, 38 yards
- PIT – Le'Veon Bell – 29 rushes, 118 yards

Top receivers

- NYG – Odell Beckham Jr. – 10 receptions, 100 yards
- PIT – Ladarius Green – 6 receptions, 110 yards, TD

After two straight road wins, the Steelers returned home for a duel against the Giants. In the first quarter, the Steelers drew first blood when a penalty was called on Ereck Flowers giving them a safety and a 2–0 lead. They would increase their lead later on when Randy Bullock kicked a 44-yard field goal to make it 5–0. In the second quarter, they pulled further ahead when Ben Roethlisberger found Antonio Brown on a 22-yard touchdown pass (with a failed two-point conversion) to make the score 11–0. Bullock put up a 38-yard field goal to make it 14–0 at halftime. In the third quarter, the Giants finally got on the board when Eli Manning found Rashad Jennings on a 13-yard touchdown pass to make it 14–7. Though the Steelers pulled away when Roethlisberger found Ladarius Green on a 20-yard touchdown pass to make it 21–7. They would increase their lead in the fourth quarter when Bullock put up a 38-yard field goal for a 24–7 game. The Giants then wrapped the scoring of the game up when Manning found Sterling Shepard on a 1-yard touchdown pass to make the final score 24–14.

With their third straight win, the Steelers improved to 7–5. Roethlisberger's record against Manning also improved to 3–1. They have now recorded at least one victory at Heinz Field against each of the 31 other franchises.

==== Week 14: at Buffalo Bills ====
Week Fourteen: Pittsburgh Steelers at Buffalo Bills – Game summary

| Quarter | 1 | 2 | 3 | 4 | Total |
|---|---|---|---|---|---|
| Steelers | 7 | 7 | 7 | 6 | 27 |
| Bills | 0 | 7 | 0 | 13 | 20 |

at New Era Field, Orchard Park, New York

- Date: December 11
- Game time: 1:00 pm. EST
- Game weather: 27 °F (−3 °C), snow showers
- Game attendance: 69,657
- Referee: Pete Morelli
- TV announcers (CBS): Jim Nantz, Phil Simms and Tracy Wolfson
- Recap, Gamebook

Game information

First quarter

- PIT – Le'Veon Bell 3-yard run (Chris Boswell kick), 6:00. Steelers 7–0. Drive: 8 plays, 71 yards, 3:06.

Second quarter

- PIT – Le'Veon Bell 7-yard run (Chris Boswell kick), 12:00. Steelers 14–0. Drive: 10 plays, 61 yards, 5:14.
- BUF – Sammy Watkins 8-yard pass from Tyrod Taylor (Dan Carpenter kick), 7:07. Steelers 14–7. Drive: 3 plays, 7 yards, 1:27.

Third quarter

- PIT – Le'Veon Bell 5-yard run (Chris Boswell kick), 5:28. Steelers 21–7. Drive: 10 plays, 82 yards, 6:33.

Fourth quarter

- PIT – Chris Boswell 37-yard field goal, 9:57. Steelers 24–7. Drive: 6 plays, 29 yards, 3:34.
- BUF – Charles Clay 40-yard pass from Tyrod Taylor (kick failed, hit left upright), 7:27. Steelers 24–13. Drive: 5 plays, 82 yards, 2:30.
- PIT – Chris Boswell 39-yard field goal, 3:38. Steelers 27–13. Drive: 9 plays, 54 yards, 3:49.
- BUF – LeSean McCoy 3-yard run (Dan Carpenter kick), 1:25. Steelers 27–20. Drive: 8 plays, 75 yards, 2:13.

Top passers

- PIT – Ben Roethlisberger – 17/31, 220 yards, 3 INT
- BUF – Tyrod Taylor – 15/25, 228 yards, 2 TD, INT

Top rushers

- PIT – Le'Veon Bell – 38 rushes, 236 yards, 3 TD
- BUF – Mike Gillislee – 2 rushes, 34 yards

Top receivers

- PIT – Antonio Brown – 5 receptions, 78 yards
- BUF – LeSean McCoy – 6 receptions, 81 yards

The Steelers traveled to Orchard Park, NY to take on the Bills. They struck first in the first quarter when Le'Veon Bell ran for a 3-yard touchdown to make the score 7–0 for the only score of the period. They increased their lead in the second quarter when Bell ran for a 7-yard touchdown to make the score 14–0. The Bills got on the board when Tyrod Taylor found Sammy Watkins on an 8-yard touchdown pass to make it 14–7 at halftime. In the third quarter, the Steelers moved ahead by double digits again when Bell ran for his third touchdown of the game from 5 yards out to make the score 21–7. In the fourth quarter, they increased their lead when Chris Boswell nailed a 37-yard field goal to make the score 24–7. The Bills drew closer when Taylor found Charles Clay on a 40-yard touchdown pass (with a failed PAT) to make the score 24–13. Though the Steelers moved ahead by two touchdowns again when Boswell kicked another field goal from 39 yards out to make it 27–13. The Bills wrapped up the scoring of the game when LeSean McCoy ran for a 3-yard touchdown and the final score of 27–20.

With their fourth straight win, the Steelers improved to 8–5.

==== Week 15: at Cincinnati Bengals ====
Week Fifteen: Pittsburgh Steelers at Cincinnati Bengals – Game summary

| Quarter | 1 | 2 | 3 | 4 | Total |
|---|---|---|---|---|---|
| Steelers | 3 | 6 | 6 | 9 | 24 |
| Bengals | 10 | 10 | 0 | 0 | 20 |

at Paul Brown Stadium, Cincinnati, Ohio

- Date: December 18
- Game time: 1:00 pm. EST
- Game weather: 24 °F (−4 °C), cloudy
- Game attendance: 62,096
- Referee: Bill Vinovich
- TV announcers (CBS): Ian Eagle, Dan Fouts and Evan Washburn
- Recap, Gamebook

Game information

First quarter

- CIN – Randy Bullock 23-yard field goal, 7:39. Bengals 3–0. Drive: 14 plays, 70 yards, 7:21.
- PIT – Chris Boswell 45-yard field goal, 3:42. Tied 3–3. Drive: 7 plays, 28 yards, 3:57.
- CIN – Andy Dalton 1-yard run (Randy Bullock kick), 0:00. Bengals 10–3. Drive: 8 plays, 64 yards, 3:42.

Second quarter

- CIN – Jeremy Hill 4-yard run (Randy Bullock kick), 9:02. Bengals 17–3. Drive: 10 plays, 82 yards, 4:16.
- PIT – Chris Boswell 49-yard field goal, 5:25. Bengals 17–6. Drive: 8 plays, 50 yards, 3:37.
- CIN – Randy Bullock 22-yard field goal, 2:51. Bengals 20–6. Drive: 7 plays, 22 yards, 2:34.
- PIT – Chris Boswell 49-yard field goal, 0:06. Bengals 20–9. Drive: 11 plays, 54 yards, 2:45.

Third quarter

- PIT – Chris Boswell 40-yard field goal, 10:38. Bengals 20–12. Drive: 9 plays, 53 yards, 4:22.
- PIT – Chris Boswell 49-yard field goal, 2:05. Bengals 20–15. Drive: 9 plays, 39 yards, 4:18.

Fourth quarter

- PIT – Chris Boswell 30-yard field goal, 12:25. Bengals 20–18. Drive: 6 plays, 22 yards, 2:36.
- PIT – Eli Rogers 24-yard pass from Ben Roethlisberger (pass failed), 7:29. Steelers 24–20. Drive: 5 plays, 69 yards, 3:22.

Top passers

- PIT – Ben Roethlisberger – 21/36, 286 yards, TD
- CIN – Andy Dalton – 16/27, 157 yards, INT

Top rushers

- PIT – Le'Veon Bell – 23 rushes, 93 yards
- CIN – Jeremy Hill – 20 rushes, 43 yards, TD

Top receivers

- PIT – Eli Rogers – 5 receptions, 75 yards, TD
- CIN – Brandon LaFell – 7 receptions, 91 yards

After a hard-fought road game, the Steelers traveled to Cincinnati to take on the Bengals. The Bengals started off the scoring in the first quarter when Randy Bullock kicked a 23-yard field goal for a 3–0 lead. The Steelers tied it up when Chris Boswell nailed a 45-yard field goal, leaving the score at 3–3, but the Bengals regained the lead late in the first quarter on Andy Dalton's 1-yard touchdown run to make the score 10–3. In the second quarter, the Bengals moved up by double digits as Jeremy Hill ran for a 4-yard touchdown to make it 17–3. The Steelers drew closer as Boswell made another field goal to make it 17–6, but Bullock put the Bengals back up by two touchdowns with a 23-yard field goal to make it 20–6. The Steelers closed the first half out with their third field goal of the game, as Boswell kicked a 49-yard effort to make the halftime score 20–9. Those three points would be the first three of 15 straight as they would shut out the Bengals in the second half, starting with field goals from 40 and 49 yards out to reduce the deficit to 20–15. In the fourth quarter, the Steelers moved even closer when Boswell kicked his sixth field goal of the game from 30 yards out to make it 20–18. They completed the comeback attempt when Ben Roethlisberger found Eli Rogers on a 24-yard touchdown pass with 7:29 remaining; however, the two-point conversion was unsuccessful, which made the score 24–20, which would end up being the final score.

With the win, the Steelers improved to 9–5. The team also won five games in a row for the first time since 2009. The Steelers finished the season 5–3 away from home.

==== Week 16: vs. Baltimore Ravens ====
NFL on Christmas Day

Week Sixteen: Baltimore Ravens at Pittsburgh Steelers – Game summary

| Quarter | 1 | 2 | 3 | 4 | Total |
|---|---|---|---|---|---|
| Ravens | 3 | 3 | 11 | 10 | 27 |
| Steelers | 7 | 0 | 3 | 21 | 31 |

at Heinz Field, Pittsburgh, Pennsylvania

- Date: December 25
- Game time: 4:30 pm. EST
- Game weather: 41 °F (5 °C), partly cloudy
- Game attendance: 66,276
- Referee: John Parry
- TV announcers (NFLN): Mike Tirico, Doug Flutie, Tony Dungy, and Heather Cox
- Recap, Gamebook

Game information

First quarter

- PIT – Xavier Grimble 20-yard pass from Ben Roethlisberger (Chris Boswell kick), 7:12. Steelers 7–0. Drive: 9 plays, 87 yards, 5:17.
- BAL – Justin Tucker 41-yard field goal, 5:50. Steelers 7–3. Drive: 5 plays, 58 yards, 1:22.

Second quarter

- BAL – Justin Tucker 38-yard field goal, 0:18. Steelers 7–6. Drive: 12 plays, 53 yards, 3:23.

Third quarter

- BAL – Steve Smith Sr. 18-yard pass from Joe Flacco (Joe Flacco–Steve Smith Sr. pass), 13:26. Ravens 14–7. Drive: 3 plays, 20 yards, 1:21.
- PIT – Chris Boswell 36-yard field goal, 9:35. Ravens 14–10. Drive: 8 plays, 65 yards, 3:51.
- BAL – Justin Tucker 46-yard field goal, 1:28. Ravens 17–10. Drive: 12 plays, 47 yards, 8:07.

Fourth quarter

- BAL – Justin Tucker 23-yard field goal, 14:18. Ravens 20–10. Drive: 4 plays, 7 yards, 1:19.
- PIT – Le'Veon Bell 7-yard run (Chris Boswell kick), 11:41. Ravens 20–17. Drive: 5 plays, 75 yards, 2:37.
- PIT – Le'Veon Bell 7-yard pass from Ben Roethlisberger (Chris Boswell kick), 7:16. Steelers 24–20. Drive: 6 plays, 90 yards, 2:49.
- BAL – Kyle Juszczyk 10-yard run (Justin Tucker kick), 1:18. Ravens 27–24. Drive: 14 plays, 75 yards, 5:58.
- PIT – Antonio Brown 4-yard pass from Ben Roethlisberger (Chris Boswell kick), 0:09. Steelers 31–27. Drive: 10 plays, 75 yards, 1:09.

Top passers

- BAL – Joe Flacco – 30/44, 262 yards, TD, INT
- PIT – Ben Roethlisberger – 24/33, 279 yards, 3 TD, 2 INT

Top rushers

- BAL – Kenneth Dixon – 12 rushes, 57 yards
- PIT – Le'Veon Bell – 20 rushes, 122 yards, TD

Top receivers

- BAL – Steve Smith Sr. – 7 receptions, 79 yards, TD
- PIT – Antonio Brown – 10 receptions, 96 yards, TD

After two straight road wins, the Steelers returned home for their second game of the season against the Ravens. The Steelers scored first in the first quarter when Ben Roethlisberger found Xavier Grimble on a 20-yard touchdown pass and a 7–0 lead. The Ravens closed out the first quarter with a Justin Tucker field goal from 41 yards out for a 7–3 lead. In the second quarter, Tucker kicked another field goal this one from 38 yards out to make the halftime score 7–6. In the third quarter, the Ravens moved into the lead when Joe Flacco found Steve Smith Sr. on an 18-yard touchdown pass with a successful two-point conversion to make it 14–7. The Steelers drew closer when Chris Boswell made a 36-yard field goal to make it 14–10. Though the Ravens moved back ahead by a touchdown when Tucker kicked a 46-yard field goal to make it 17–10. In the fourth quarter, Tucker kicked a 23-yard field goal to send the Ravens up by double digits and make the score 20–10. The Steelers eventually retook the lead with 2 straight touchdowns: Le'Veon Bell ran for one from 7-yards out followed by Roethlisberger finding Bell on a 7-yard pass to take the score to 24–20. The Ravens retook the lead when Kyle Juszczyk ran for a 10-yard touchdown to make it 27–24. However, the Steelers completed the comeback when Roethlisberger found Antonio Brown on a 4-yard pass to make the final score 31–27.

With their four-game losing streak against the Ravens snapped, the Steelers improved to 10–5 and were awarded the AFC North division title while also knocking Baltimore out of playoff contention. The team also won six games in a row for the first time since 2004.

Brown's game-winning touchdown was dubbed the Immaculate Extension as he had to extend the ball over the goal line after being stood up at the one-yard line.

==== Week 17: vs. Cleveland Browns ====
Week Seventeen: Cleveland Browns at Pittsburgh Steelers – Game summary

| Quarter | 1 | 2 | 3 | 4 | OT | Total |
|---|---|---|---|---|---|---|
| Browns | 7 | 7 | 0 | 7 | 3 | 24 |
| Steelers | 0 | 7 | 0 | 14 | 6 | 27 |

at Heinz Field, Pittsburgh, Pennsylvania

- Date: January 1, 2017
- Game time: 1:00 pm. EST
- Game weather: 41 °F (5 °C), sunny
- Game attendance: 55,921
- Referee: John Hussey
- TV announcers (CBS): Kevin Harlan and Rich Gannon
- Recap, Gamebook

Game information

First quarter

- CLE – Seth DeValve 12-yard pass from Robert Griffin III (Cody Parkey kick), 7:48. Browns 7–0. Drive: 8 plays, 55 yards, 4:18.

Second quarter

- CLE – Gary Barnidge 4-yard pass from Robert Griffin III (Cody Parkey kick), 9:21. Browns 14–0. Drive: 11 plays, 67 yards, 5:42.
- PIT – DeAngelo Williams 11-yard pass from Landry Jones (Chris Boswell kick), 0:31. Browns 14–7. Drive: 7 plays, 37 yards, 1:30.

Third quarter

- No scoring plays

Fourth quarter

- PIT – DeAngelo Williams 1-yard run (Chris Boswell kick), 13:21. Tied 14–14. Drive: 10 plays, 80 yards, 5:01.
- PIT – Demarcus Ayers 11-yard pass from Landry Jones (Chris Boswell kick), 5:14. Steelers 21–14. Drive: 5 plays, 61 yards, 2:20.
- CLE – George Atkinson III 5-yard run (Cody Parkey kick), 3:28. Tied 21–21. Drive: 3 plays, 68 yards, 1:46.

Overtime

- CLE – Cody Parkey 34-yard field goal, 7:17. Browns 24–21. Drive: 17 plays, 65 yards, 7:43.
- PIT – Cobi Hamilton 26-yard pass from Landry Jones, 2:57. Steelers 27–24. Drive: 9 plays, 75 yards, 4:20.

Top passers

- CLE – Robert Griffin III – 29/40, 232 yards, 2 TD, INT
- PIT – Landry Jones – 24/37, 277 yards, 3 TD, INT

Top rushers

- CLE – Isaiah Crowell – 19 rushes, 152 yards
- PIT – DeAngelo Williams – 23 rushes, 67 yards, TD

Top receivers

- CLE – Terrelle Pryor – 7 receptions, 94 yards
- PIT – Eli Rogers – 6 receptions, 61 yards

After a tough win, the Steelers stayed home for the last regular season game which would turn out to be Round 2 against the Browns. The Browns struck first in the first quarter when Seth DeValve ran for a 12-yard touchdown to make it 7–0 for the only score of the period. They made it 14–0 in the second quarter when RG3 found Gary Barnidge on a 4-yard pass. The Steelers got on the board when backup QB Landry Jones found De'Angelo Williams on an 11-yard pass to make it 14–7 at halftime. After a scoreless third quarter, the Steelers continued their reign of scoring unanswered points in the fourth when Williams ran for a 1-yard touchdown to tie the game at 14–14 before taking the lead when Jones found Demarcus Ayers on an 11-yard pass to make it 21–14. Though, the Browns would close out regulation, tying the game at 21–21 when George Atkinson III ran for a 5-yard touchdown. In overtime, the Browns retook the lead when Cody Parkey nailed a 34-yard field goal to make it 24–21. The Steelers would eventually score the game-winning touchdown when Jones found Cobi Hamilton on a 26-yard pass to make the final score 27–24.

With the win, the Steelers finished their season 11–5. The team also won seven games in a row for the first time since 2004 and finished the season 6-2 at home.

=== Postseason ===
==== AFC Wild Card Playoffs: vs. (6) Miami Dolphins ====
AFC Wild Card Playoffs: (6) Miami Dolphins at (3) Pittsburgh Steelers – Game summary

| Quarter | 1 | 2 | 3 | 4 | Total |
|---|---|---|---|---|---|
| Dolphins | 3 | 3 | 0 | 6 | 12 |
| Steelers | 14 | 6 | 10 | 0 | 30 |

at Heinz Field, Pittsburgh, Pennsylvania

- Date: January 8, 2017
- Game time: 1:05 p.m. EST
- Game weather: 17 °F (−8 °C), partly cloudy
- Game attendance: 62,726
- Referee: Craig Wrolstad
- TV announcers (CBS): Jim Nantz, Phil Simms, Tracy Wolfson and Jay Feely
- Recap, Gamebook

Game information

First quarter

- PIT – Antonio Brown 50-yard pass from Ben Roethlisberger (Chris Boswell kick), 12:15. Steelers 7–0. Drive: 5 plays, 85 yards, 2:45.
- PIT – Antonio Brown 62-yard pass from Ben Roethlisberger (Chris Boswell kick), 6:50. Steelers 14–0. Drive: 6 plays, 90 yards, 3:10.
- MIA – Andrew Franks 38-yard field goal, 3:06. Steelers 14–3. Drive: 7 play, 39 yards, 3:44.

Second quarter

- PIT – Le'Veon Bell 1-yard run (kick failed, hit right upright), 12:39. Steelers 20–3. Drive: 10 plays, 83 yards, 5:27.
- MIA – Andrew Franks 47-yard field goal, 4:52. Steelers 20–6. Drive: 12 play, 39 yards, 7:47.

Third quarter

- PIT – Chris Boswell 34-yard field goal, 6:32. Steelers 23–6. Drive: 8 play, 43 yards, 4:16.
- PIT – Le'Veon Bell 8-yard run (Chris Boswell kick), 2:05. Steelers 30–6. Drive: 7 plays, 25 yards, 4:18.

Fourth quarter

- MIA – Damien Williams 4-yard pass from Matt Moore (pass failed), 5:57. Steelers 30–12. Drive: 9 plays, 70 yards, 4:20.

Top passers

- MIA – Matt Moore – 29/36, 289 yards, TD, INT
- PIT – Ben Roethlisberger – 13/18, 197 yards, 2 TD, 2 INT

Top rushers

- MIA – Jay Ajayi – 16 rushes, 33 yards
- PIT – Le'Veon Bell – 29 rushes, 167 yards, 2 TD

Top receivers

- MIA – Jarvis Landry – 11 receptions, 102 yards
- PIT – Antonio Brown – 5 receptions, 124 yards, 2 TD

The Steelers had wrapped the regular season up with the #3 seed and played against the sixth-seeded Dolphins at home. The Steelers would draw first blood with Ben Roethlisberger finding Antonio Brown on 2 consecutive touchdown passes: from 50 and 62 yards out to make the score 14–0. The Dolphins got on the board later on when Andrew Franks kicked a 40-yard field goal to make it 14–3. In the second quarter, the Steelers made the score 20–3 when Le'Veon Bell ran for a 1-yard touchdown, although Chris Boswell missed his first extra point attempt of the season. The Dolphins closed out the first half when Franks kicked a 47-yard field goal to make it 20–6. In the second half, the Steelers scored twice when Boswell nailed a 34-yard field goal to make it 23–6. Bell then ran for an 8-yard touchdown to make it 30–6. In the fourth quarter, the Dolphins wrapped the scoring of the game up when Matt Moore, who was filling in for the injured Ryan Tannehill found Damien Williams on a 4-yard pass (with a failed two-point conversion) to make the final score 30–12. As of 2025, this remains the Steelers last playoff win at home.

==== AFC Divisional Playoffs: at (2) Kansas City Chiefs ====
AFC Divisional Playoffs: (3) Pittsburgh Steelers at (2) Kansas City Chiefs – Game summary

| Quarter | 1 | 2 | 3 | 4 | Total |
|---|---|---|---|---|---|
| Steelers | 6 | 6 | 3 | 3 | 18 |
| Chiefs | 7 | 0 | 3 | 6 | 16 |

at Arrowhead Stadium, Kansas City, Missouri

- Date: January 15, 2017
- Game time: 8:20 pm. EST/7:20 p.m. CST
- Game weather: 33 °F (1 °C), cloudy with patches of fog
- Game attendance: 75,678
- Referee: Carl Cheffers
- TV announcers (NBC): Al Michaels, Cris Collinsworth, Michele Tafoya and Heather Cox
- Recap, Gamebook

Game information

First quarter

- PIT – Chris Boswell 22-yard field goal, 9:38. Steelers 3–0. Drive: 11 plays, 66 yards, 5:22.
- KC – Albert Wilson 5-yard pass from Alex Smith (Cairo Santos kick), 6:09. Chiefs 7–3. Drive: 6 plays, 55 yards, 3:29.
- PIT – Chris Boswell 38-yard field goal, 3:51. Chiefs 7–6. Drive: 7 plays, 55 yards, 2:18.

Second quarter

- PIT – Chris Boswell 36-yard field goal, 9:18. Steelers 9–7. Drive: 14 plays, 53 yards, 6:30.
- PIT – Chris Boswell 45-yard field goal, 0:55. Steelers 12–7. Drive: 9 plays, 28 yards, 4:08.

Third quarter

- PIT – Chris Boswell 43-yard field goal, 10:06. Steelers 15–7. Drive: 7 plays, 49 yards, 3:42.
- KC – Cairo Santos 48-yard field goal, 0:10. Steelers 15–10. Drive: 7 plays, 16 yards, 2:50.

Fourth quarter

- PIT – Chris Boswell 43-yard field goal, 9:49. Steelers 18–10. Drive: 10 plays, 45 yards, 5:21.
- KC – Spencer Ware 1-yard run (pass failed), 2:43. Steelers 18–16. Drive: 13 plays, 75 yards, 7:06.

Top passers

- PIT – Ben Roethlisberger – 20/31, 224 yards, INT
- KC – Alex Smith – 20/34, 172 yards, TD, INT

Top rushers

- PIT – Le'Veon Bell – 30 rushes, 170 yards
- KC – Spencer Ware – 8 rushes, 35 yards, TD

Top receivers

- PIT – Antonio Brown – 6 receptions, 108 yards
- KC– Travis Kelce – 5 receptions, 77 yards

After blowing out the Dolphins at home, the Steelers traveled to Kansas City to take on the Chiefs. The Steelers scored first in the first quarter when Chris Boswell kicked a 22-yard field goal for a 3-0 lead. The Chiefs moved into the lead when Alex Smith found Albert Wilson on a 5-yard touchdown pass to make it 7-3. The Steelers came within a point when Boswell kicked a 38-yard field goal to make it 7-6. In the second quarter, it was all Steelers when Boswell kicked 2 more field goals: from 36 and 45 yards out retaking the lead and changing the score from 9-7 to 12-7 at halftime. In the third quarter, the Steelers moved further ahead with another field goal by Boswell from 43 yards out to make it 15-7. The Chiefs then moved closer later on in the quarter when Cairo Santos kicked a 48-yard field goal to make it 15-10. In the fourth quarter, Boswell kicked another 43 yard field goal to move ahead 18-10. The Chiefs tried to rally but came up short when Spencer Ware ran for a 1-yard touchdown (with a failed 2-point conversion) sealing the win for the Steelers.

With the win, the team improved to 13-5 overall. They are also the first team since the 2006 Colts to win a playoff game without scoring a single touchdown. As of 2025, this was the last time the Steelers have won a playoff game.

Boswell's six field goals became an NFL playoff record for the most in a single game.

==== AFC Championship: at (2) New England Patriots ====
AFC Championship: (3) Pittsburgh Steelers at (1) New England Patriots – Game summary

| Quarter | 1 | 2 | 3 | 4 | Total |
|---|---|---|---|---|---|
| Steelers | 0 | 9 | 0 | 8 | 17 |
| Patriots | 10 | 7 | 16 | 3 | 36 |

at Gillette Stadium, Foxborough, Massachusetts

- Date: January 22, 2017
- Game time: 6:40 pm. EST
- Game weather: 41 °F (5 °C), cloudy
- Game attendance: 66,829
- Referee: Terry McAulay
- TV announcers (CBS): Jim Nantz, Phil Simms, Tracy Wolfson and Jay Feely
- Recap, Gamebook

Game information

First quarter

- NE – Stephen Gostkowski 31-yard field goal, 13:08. Patriots 3–0. Drive: 6 plays, 62 yards, 1:52.
- NE – Chris Hogan 16-yard pass from Tom Brady (Stephen Gostkowski kick), 2:47. Patriots 10–0. Drive: 11 plays, 80 yards, 4:36.

Second quarter

- PIT – DeAngelo Williams 5-yard run (kick failed, wide left), 11:31. Patriots 10–6. Drive: 13 plays, 84 yards, 6:16.
- NE – Chris Hogan 34-yard pass from Tom Brady (Stephen Gostkowski kick), 7:43. Patriots 17–6. Drive: 9 plays, 82 yards, 3:48.
- PIT – Chris Boswell 23-yard field goal, 1:39. Patriots 17–9. Drive: 15 plays, 70 yards, 6:04.

Third quarter

- NE – Stephen Gostkowski 47-yard field goal, 9:59. Patriots 20–9. Drive: 9 plays, 55 yards, 3:11.
- NE – LeGarrette Blount 1-yard run (Stephen Gostkowski kick), 2:44. Patriots 27–9. Drive: 8 plays, 88 yards, 3:52.
- NE – Julian Edelman 10-yard pass from Tom Brady (kick failed, wide right), 1:35. Patriots 33–9. Drive: 4 plays, 28 yards, 1:01.

Fourth quarter

- NE – Stephen Gostkowski 26-yard field goal, 6:24. Patriots 36–9. Drive: 8 plays, 24 yards, 3:5.
- PIT – Cobi Hamilton 30-yard pass from Ben Roethlisberger (Ben Roethlisberger-DeAngelo Williams pass), 3:36. Patriots 36–17. Drive: 9 plays, 75 yards, 2:48.

Top passers

- PIT – Ben Roethlisberger – 31/47, 314 yards, TD, INT
- NE – Tom Brady – 32/42, 384 yards, 3 TD

Top rushers

- PIT – DeAngelo Williams – 14 rushes, 34 yards, TD
- NE – LeGarrette Blount – 16 rushes, 47 yards, TD

Top receivers

- PIT – Antonio Brown – 7 receptions, 77 yards
- NE – Chris Hogan – 9 receptions, 180 yards, 2 TD

After a tough road win, the Steelers traveled further east to take on the top-seeded Patriots in the AFC Championship game. The Pats drew first blood when Stephen Gostkowski kicked a 31-yard field goal for a 3-0 lead. This would be followed up by Tom Brady finding Chris Hogan on a 16-yard pass to make it 10-0. In the second quarter, the Steelers got on the board when DeAngelo Williams ran for a touchdown from 5 yards out (with a failed PAT) for a 10-6. The Pats pulled away as Brady and Hogan hooked up again on a 34-yard pass to make it 17-6. The Steelers closed out the half when Chris Boswell nailed a 23-yard field goal to make the halftime score 17-9. In the third quarter, the Pats went back to work as Gostowski kicked a 47-yard field goal to send his team up by double digits again, 20-9. LaGarrette Blount ran up the middle for a 1-yard touchdown to make it 27-9. Brady later on found Julian Edelman on a 10-yard pass (with a failed PAT) to make it 33-9. In the fourth quarter, the Pats moved even further ahead when Gostkowski kicked a 26-yard field goal to make it 36-9. The Steelers then wrapped the scoring of the game up when Ben Roethlisberger found Cobi Hamilton on a 30-yard pass with a successful 2-point conversion to make the final score 36-17.

With the loss, the Steelers ended their season 13-6. Roethlisberger dropped to 3-2 in Conference Championship games. As of 2025, this remains the last appearance in the AFC Championship for the Steelers.

== Standings ==
=== Division ===
AFC North
| | W | L | T | PCT | DIV | CONF | PF | PA | STK |
|---|---|---|---|---|---|---|---|---|---|
| ^{(3)} Pittsburgh Steelers | 11 | 5 | 0 | .688 | 5–1 | 9–3 | 399 | 327 | W7 |
| Baltimore Ravens | 8 | 8 | 0 | .500 | 4–2 | 7–5 | 343 | 321 | L2 |
| Cincinnati Bengals | 6 | 9 | 1 | .406 | 3–3 | 5–7 | 325 | 315 | W1 |
| Cleveland Browns | 1 | 15 | 0 | .063 | 0–6 | 1–11 | 264 | 452 | L1 |

=== Conference ===
AFC
| # | Team | Division | W | L | T | PCT | DIV | CONF | SOS | SOV | STK |
|---|---|---|---|---|---|---|---|---|---|---|---|
Division leaders
| 1 | New England Patriots | East | 14 | 2 | 0 | .875 | 5–1 | 11–1 | .439 | .424 | W7 |
| 2 (Note: Kansas City clinched the AFC West division over Oakland based on head-to-head sweep.) | Kansas City Chiefs | West | 12 | 4 | 0 | .750 | 6–0 | 9–3 | .508 | .479 | W2 |
| 3 | Pittsburgh Steelers | North | 11 | 5 | 0 | .688 | 5–1 | 9–3 | .494 | .423 | W7 |
| 4 (Note: Houston clinched the AFC South division title over Tennessee based on record vs. division opponents.) | Houston Texans | South | 9 | 7 | 0 | .563 | 5–1 | 7–5 | .502 | .427 | L1 |
Wild Cards
| 5 | Oakland Raiders | West | 12 | 4 | 0 | .750 | 3–3 | 9–3 | .504 | .443 | L1 |
| 6 | Miami Dolphins | East | 10 | 6 | 0 | .625 | 4–2 | 7–5 | .455 | .341 | L1 |
Did not qualify for the postseason
| 7 (Note: Tennessee finished ahead of Denver based on head-to-head victory.) | Tennessee Titans | South | 9 | 7 | 0 | .563 | 2–4 | 6–6 | .465 | .458 | W1 |
| 8 | Denver Broncos | West | 9 | 7 | 0 | .563 | 2–4 | 6–6 | .549 | .455 | W1 |
| 9 (Note: Baltimore finished ahead of Indianapolis based on record vs. conference opponents.) | Baltimore Ravens | North | 8 | 8 | 0 | .500 | 4–2 | 7–5 | .498 | .363 | L2 |
| 10 | Indianapolis Colts | South | 8 | 8 | 0 | .500 | 3–3 | 5–7 | .492 | .406 | W1 |
| 11 | Buffalo Bills | East | 7 | 9 | 0 | .438 | 1–5 | 4–8 | .482 | .339 | L2 |
| 12 | Cincinnati Bengals | North | 6 | 9 | 1 | .406 | 3–3 | 5–7 | .521 | .333 | W1 |
| 13 (Note: The New York Jets finished ahead of San Diego based record vs. common opponents — the Jets' cumulative record against Cleveland, Indianapolis, Kansas City and Miami was 1–4, while San Diego's cumulative record against the same four teams was 0–5.) | New York Jets | East | 5 | 11 | 0 | .313 | 2–4 | 4–8 | .518 | .313 | W1 |
| 14 | San Diego Chargers | West | 5 | 11 | 0 | .313 | 1–5 | 4–8 | .543 | .513 | L5 |
| 15 | Jacksonville Jaguars | South | 3 | 13 | 0 | .188 | 2–4 | 2–10 | .527 | .417 | L1 |
| 16 | Cleveland Browns | North | 1 | 15 | 0 | .063 | 0–6 | 1–11 | .549 | .313 | L1 |
Tiebreakers (Note: When breaking ties for three or more teams under the NFL's rules, they are first broken within divisions, then comparing only the highest ranked remaining team from each division.)

== Transactions ==
The Steelers have been involved in the following transactions during the 2016 season:

=== Trades ===
| Player | Acquired from | Traded to | Date | Trade terms |
|---|---|---|---|---|
| CB Justin Gilbert | Cleveland Browns | | September 3, 2016 | 2018 6th Rd. pick |

=== Free agents ===
| Player | Acquired from | Lost to | Date | Contract terms |
|---|---|---|---|---|
| TE Ladarius Green | San Diego Chargers | | March 9, 2016 | 4 years/$20 million |
| T Kelvin Beachum | | Jacksonville Jaguars | March 15, 2016 | 5 years/$39.5 million |
| T Ryan Harris | Denver Broncos | | March 15, 2016 | 2 years/$3.9 million |
| NT Steve McLendon | | New York Jets | March 15, 2016 | 3 years/$10.5 million |
| ILB Sean Spence | | Tennessee Titans | March 16, 2016 | 1 year/$2.5 million |
| CB Antwon Blake | | Tennessee Titans | March 17, 2016 | 1 year/$1.5 million |
| ILB Terence Garvin | | Washington Redskins | March 17, 2016 | 1 year/$750,000 |
| RB Jordan Todman | | Indianapolis Colts | March 18, 2016 | 1 year/$760,000 |
| ILB Steven Johnson | Tennessee Titans | | March 25, 2016 | 1 year/$840,000 |
| CB Brandon Boykin | | Carolina Panthers | March 29, 2016 | 1 year/$840,000 |
| DE Ricardo Mathews | San Diego Chargers | | March 31, 2016 | 1 year/$760,000 |
| FB Will Johnson | | New York Giants | April 4, 2016 | 2 years/$2.3 million |
| T Byron Stingily | | New York Giants | April 11, 2016 | 1 year/$780,000 |
| NT Cam Thomas | | Los Angeles Rams | June 6, 2016 | 1 year/$760,000 |

=== Waivers ===
| Player | Claimed from | Lost to | Date |
|---|---|---|---|
| QB Zach Mettenberger | San Diego Chargers | | August 31, 2016 |

=== Signings ===
| Player | Date | Contract terms |
|---|---|---|
| T Chris Hubbard | January 19, 2016 | 1-year extension/$600,000 |
| FB Roosevelt Nix | January 19, 2016 | 1-year extension/$525,000 |
| SS Jordan Dangerfield | January 19, 2016 | (Reserve/Future) |
| T Matt Feiler | January 19, 2016 | (Reserve/Future) |
| G B. J. Finney | January 19, 2016 | (Reserve/Future) |
| CB Isaiah Frey | January 19, 2016 | (Reserve/Future) |
| TE Xavier Grimble | January 19, 2016 | (Reserve/Future) |
| DE Caushaud Lyons | January 19, 2016 | (Reserve/Future) |
| RB Rajion Neal | January 19, 2016 | (Reserve/Future) |
| WR Shakim Phillips | January 19, 2016 | (Reserve/Future) |
| RB Abou Toure | January 19, 2016 | (Reserve/Future) |
| SS Ray Vinpoal | January 19, 2016 | (Reserve/Future) |
| FS Jacob Hagen | January 20, 2016 | (Reserve/Future) |
| T Brian Mihalik | January 20, 2016 | (Reserve/Future) |
| K Ty Long | January 20, 2016 | (Reserve/Future) |
| RB Daryl Richardson | January 20, 2016 | (Reserve/Future) |
| CB Ross Cockrell | January 22, 2016 | 1-year extension/$600,000 |
| QB Dustin Vaughan | January 22, 2016 | (Reserve/Future) |
| WR Levi Norwood | February 2, 2016 | (Reserve/Future) |
| WR Issac Blakeney | February 5, 2016 | (Reserve/Future) |
| CB Montell Garner | February 5, 2016 | (Reserve/Future) |
| WR Tobais Palmer | February 5, 2016 | (Reserve/Future) |
| CB Al-Hajj Shabazz | February 5, 2016 | (Reserve/Future) |
| G Cole Manhart | February 9, 2016 | (Reserve/Future) |
| LS Greg Warren | February 12, 2016 | 1-year extension/$1.06 million |
| LS Matt Dooley | February 16, 2016 | (Reserve/Future) |
| NT Lavon Hooks | February 16, 2016 | (Reserve/Future) |
| DE Roy Philon | February 22, 2016 | (Reserve/Future) |
| FS Robert Golden | March 7, 2016 | 3-year extension/$5 million |
| WR Darrius Heyward-Bey | March 7, 2016 | 3-year extension/$3.8 million |
| CB William Gay | March 8, 2016 | 3-year extension/$7.5 million |
| G Ramon Foster | March 9, 2016 | 3-year extension/$9.6 million |
| QB Bruce Gradkowski | May 2, 2016 | 1-year/$965,000 |
| WR Demarcus Ayers | May 5, 2016 | 4-year/$2.42 million |
| ILB Tyler Matakevich | May 5, 2016 | 4-year/$2.4 million |
| OLB Travis Feeney | May 6, 2016 | 4-year/$2.44 million |
| RB Brandon Brown-Dukes | May 9, 2016 | 3-year/$1.62 million |
| RB Cameron Stingily | May 9, 2016 | 1-year/$450,000 |
| WR Marcus Tucker | May 9, 2016 | 3-year/$1.62 million |
| CB Donald Washington | May 9, 2016 | 1-year/$675,000 |
| TE David Johnson | May 17, 2016 | 1-year/$760,000 |
| FS Sean Davis | May 20, 2016 | 4-year/$4.08 million |
| T Jerald Hawkins | June 2, 2016 | 4-year/$2.87 million |
| OLB Kevin Anderson | June 7, 2016 | 1-year/$450,000 |
| TE Paul Lang | June 7, 2016 | 1-year/$450,000 |
| ILB Mike Reilly | June 8, 2016 | 1-year/$450,000 |
| CB Artie Burns | June 8, 2016 | 4-year/$9.59 million |
| NT Javon Hargrave | June 10, 2016 | 4-year/$3.11 million |
| RB Brandon Johnson | June 24, 2016 | 1-year/$450,000 |
| TE Mandel Dixon | July 21, 2016 | 1-year/$450,000 |
| RB Christian Powell | August 1, 2016 | 3-year/$1.62 million |
| C Valerian Ume-Ezeoke | August 1, 2016 | 1-year/$450,000 |
| TE Jake Phillips | August 3, 2016 | 1-year/$450,000 |
| CB Kevin White | August 3, 2016 | 1-year/$450,000 |
| TE Michael Cooper | August 5, 2016 | 1-year/$450,000 |
| WR Cobi Hamilton | August 5, 2016 | 1-year/$450,000 |
| T Wade Hansen | August 14, 2016 | 1-year/$450,000 |
| CB Julian Whigham | August 14, 2016 | 1-year/$450,000 |
| OLB Jermauria Rasco | August 15, 2016 | 2-year/$990,000 |
| QB Bryn Renner | August 20, 2016 | 1-year/$450,000 |
| G Antoine Everett | August 20, 2016 | 2-year/$990,000 |
| ILB Vince Williams | August 23, 2016 | 3-year extension/$5.5 million |
| TE RaShaun Allen | September 4, 2016 | Practice Squad |
| WR Demarcus Ayers | September 4, 2016 | Practice Squad |
| RB Brandon Browns-Duke | September 4, 2016 | Practice Squad |
| OLB Travis Feeney | September 4, 2016 | Practice Squad |
| T Matt Feiler | September 4, 2016 | Practice Squad |
| WR Cobi Hamilton | September 4, 2016 | Practice Squad |
| DE Caushaud Lyons | September 4, 2016 | Practice Squad |
| NT Johnny Maxey | September 4, 2016 | Practice Squad |
| CB Al-Hajj Shabazz | September 4, 2016 | Practice Squad |
| RB Cameron Stingily | September 4, 2016 | Practice Squad |
| ILB Steven Johnson | September 4, 2016 | 1-year/$760,000 |
| RB David Cobb | September 7, 2016 | Practice Squad |
| G David DeCastro | September 8, 2016 | 6-year extension/$58 million |
| FS Jacob Hagen | September 16, 2016 | Practice Squad |
| RB Daryl Richardson | October 3, 2016 | Practice Squad |
| FS Jacob Hagen | October 11, 2016 | Practice Squad |
| T Austin Shepherd | October 11, 2016 | Practice Squad |
| RB Karlos Williams | October 12, 2016 | Practice Squad |

=== Cuts ===
| Player | Date |
|---|---|
| TE Rob Blanchflower | February 16, 2016 |
| T Kelvin Palmer | February 16, 2016 |
| T Mitchell Van Dyk | February 16, 2016 |
| T Micah Hatchie | March 1, 2016 |
| CB Cortez Allen | April 15, 2016 |
| T Mike Adams | May 5, 2016 |
| K Ty Long | May 5, 2016 |
| RB Abou Toure | May 5, 2016 |
| CB Isaiah Frey | May 9, 2016 |
| RB Rajion Neal | May 9, 2016 |
| WR Tobais Palmer | May 9, 2016 |
| RB Christian Powell | May 9, 2016 |
| TE David Reese | May 17, 2016 |
| OLB Tyriq McCord | June 7, 2016 |
| TE Jay Rome | June 7, 2016 |
| K Shaun Suisham | June 24, 2016 |
| TE Matt Spaeth | July 21, 2016 |
| RB Brandon Johnson | August 1, 2016 |
| C Quinton Schooley | August 1, 2016 |
| TE Jake Phillips | August 5, 2016 |
| T Brian Mihalik | August 14, 2016 |
| NT Roy Philon | August 14, 2016 |
| LS Matt Dooley | August 15, 2016 |
| RB Christian Powell | August 20, 2016 |
| WR Isaac Blackeney | August 28, 2016 |
| TE Michael Cooper | August 28, 2016 |
| P Will Monday | August 28, 2016 |
| NT Khoynin Mosley-Smith | August 28, 2016 |
| DE Giorgio Newberry | August 28, 2016 |
| WR Levi Norwood | August 28, 2016 |
| ILB Mike Reilly | August 28, 2016 |
| CB Julian Whigham | August 28, 2016 |
| ILB Jordan Zumwalt | August 28, 2016 |
| FS Jacob Hagen | August 30, 2016 |
| DT Devaunte Sigler | August 30, 2016 |
| CB Kevin White | August 30, 2016 |
| TE Mandel Dixon | September 2, 2016 |
| T Wade Hansen | September 2, 2016 |
| QB Dustin Vaughan | September 2, 2016 |
| WR Demarcus Ayers | September 3, 2016 |
| RB Brandon Browns-Duke | September 3, 2016 |
| G Antoine Everett | September 3, 2016 |
| OLB Travis Feeney | September 3, 2016 |
| CB Montell Garner | September 3, 2016 |
| CB Doran Grant | September 3, 2016 |
| OLB Travis Feeney | September 3, 2016 |
| T Matt Feiler | September 3, 2016 |
| WR Cobi Hamilton | September 3, 2016 |
| NT Lavon Hooks | September 3, 2016 |
| ILB Steven Johnson | September 3, 2016 |
| DE Caushaud Lyons | September 3, 2016 |
| NT Johnny Maxey | September 3, 2016 |
| OLB Jermauria Rasco | September 3, 2016 |
| QB Bryn Renner | September 3, 2016 |
| CB Al-Hajj Shabazz | September 3, 2016 |
| RB Cameron Stingily | September 3, 2016 |
| WR Marcus Tucker | September 3, 2016 |
| SS Ray Vinopal | September 3, 2016 |
| CB Donald Washington | September 3, 2016 |
| RB Cameron Stingily | September 7, 2016 |
| RB Brandon Brown-Dukes | September 16, 2016 |
| RB Daryl Richardson | September 29, 2016 |
| FS Jacob Hagen | October 3, 2016 |
| RB David Cobb | October 11, 2016 |
| CB Al-Hajj Shabazz | October 15, 2016 |

=== Other ===
| Name | Date | Details |
|---|---|---|
| TE Heath Miller | February 19, 2016 | Retired |
| Kevin Colbert | July 28, 2016 | Promoted to team Vice President |
| Omar Khan | July 28, 2016 | Promoted to Vice President of Football & Business Administration |
