= Johnny Maxey =

American football player (born 1993)

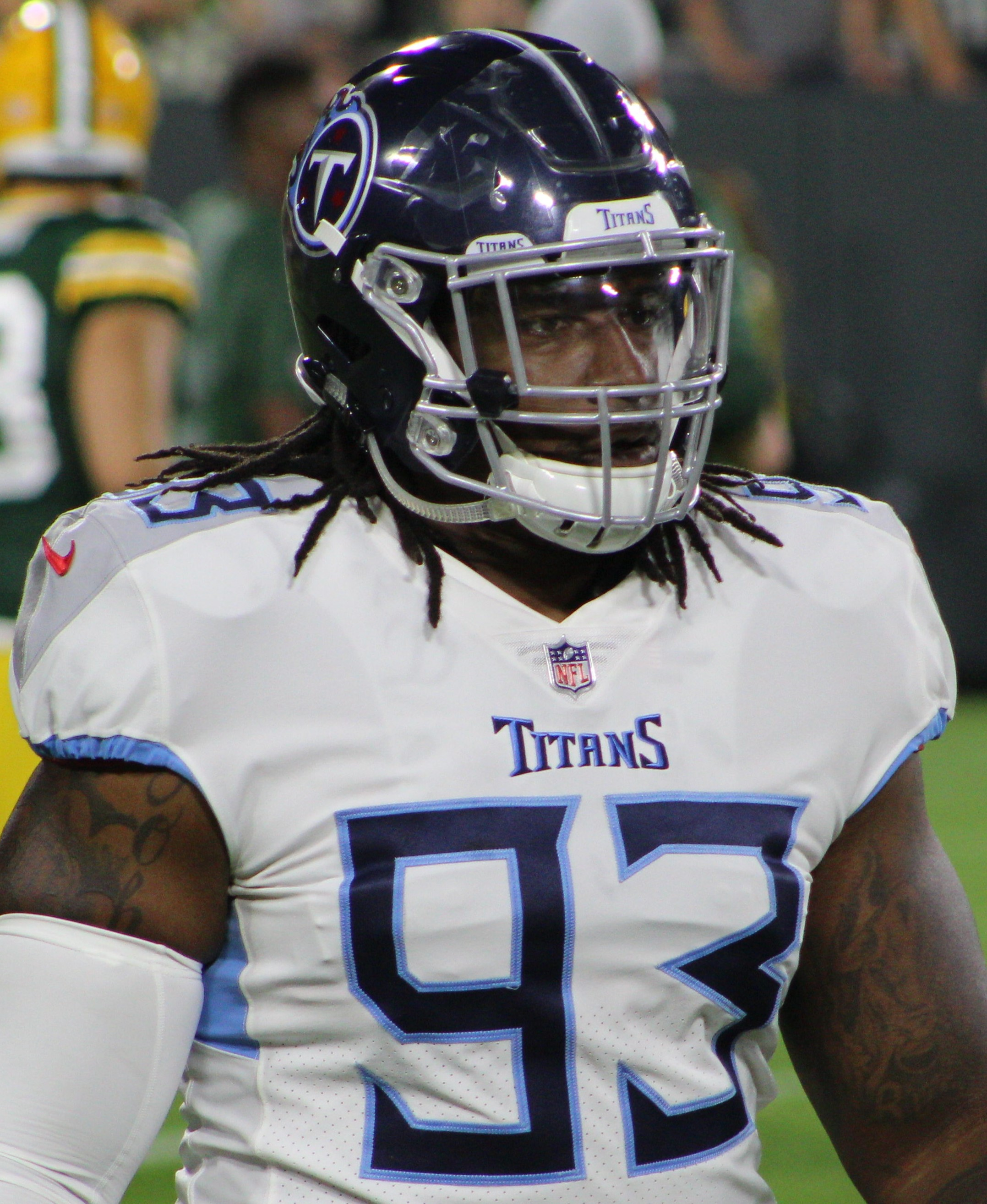
- Maxey with the Tennessee Titans in 2018

No. 62, 93, 90
- Position: Defensive end

Personal information
- Born: October 19, 1993 (age 33); Columbia, South Carolina, U.S.
- Listed height: 6 ft 5 in (1.96 m)
- Listed weight: 283 lb (128 kg)

Career information
- High school: Canandaigua Academy (Canandaigua, New York)
- College: Mars Hill
- NFL draft: 2016: undrafted

Career history
- Pittsburgh Steelers (2016); Tennessee Titans (2017–2018); Memphis Express (2019)*; Birmingham Iron (2019); Houston Roughnecks (2020); Tampa Bay Bandits (2022)*
- * Offseason or practice squad member only

Career NFL statistics
- Total tackles: 1
- Stats at Pro Football Reference

Johnny Maxey (born October 19, 1993) is an American former professional football player who was a defensive end in the National Football League (NFL). He played college football for the Mars Hill Lions and signed with the Pittsburgh Steelers as an undrafted free agent in 2016.

== College career ==
Maxey played at Mars Hill University, where he was a second-team South Atlantic Conference performer for the Lions after getting 82 tackles and three sacks as a senior.

== Professional career ==
=== Pittsburgh Steelers ===
Maxey was signed by the Steelers as an undrafted rookie free agent following the 2016 NFL draft on May 1, 2016. He was released as part of final roster cuts and signed to the teams' practice squad on September 4, 2016.

After suffering several injuries along the defensive line, the Steelers promoted Maxey to the active roster on December 24, 2016. He made his debut the next day in a key victory against the Baltimore Ravens. On January 1, 2017, he made his first career tackle in a 27–24 overtime victory over the Cleveland Browns.

On September 2, 2017, Maxey was waived by the Steelers.

=== Tennessee Titans ===
On December 19, 2017, Maxey was signed to the Tennessee Titans' practice squad. He signed a reserve/future contract with the Titans on January 15, 2018. On April 30, 2018, Maxey was released. On July 31, 2018, he was re-signed by the Titans. He was waived/injured on August 10, 2018 and was placed on injured reserve. He was released on October 23, 2018.

=== Alliance of American Football ===
In 2019, Maxey signed with the Memphis Express of the Alliance of American Football, but did not make the final roster. Instead, he joined the Birmingham Iron. The league ceased operations in April 2019.

=== Houston Roughnecks ===
In October 2019, Maxey was picked by the Houston Roughnecks during the open phase of the 2020 XFL draft. He had his contract terminated when the league suspended operations on April 10, 2020.

=== Tampa Bay Bandits ===
Maxey signed with the Tampa Bay Bandits of the USFL on April 1, 2022, but was released six days later.
