= Antoine Everett =

American football player (born 1991)

Profile
- Position: Guard

Personal information
- Born: November 16, 1991 (age 34); Richmond, Texas, U.S.
- Listed height: 6 ft 3 in (1.91 m)
- Listed weight: 325 lb (147 kg)

Career information
- High school: Lamar Consolidated High School
- College: McNeese State
- NFL draft: 2015: undrafted

Career history
- Tampa Bay Buccaneers (2015–2016)*; Pittsburgh Steelers (2016)*; Baltimore Brigade (2019)
- * Offseason or practice squad member only

Antoine Everett (born November 16, 1991) is an American former professional football offensive guard. He played college football at McNeese State.

== Professional career ==
=== Tampa Bay Buccaneers ===
Everett was signed as an undrafted rookie to the Tampa Bay Buccaneers on May 19, 2015. On August 30, he was waived. On September 30, he was signed to the Buccaneers' practice squad. On January 5, 2016, he was signed to a reserve/future contract.

Everett was waived on April 29, 2016.

=== Pittsburgh Steelers ===
On August 20, 2016, Everett was signed by the Steelers. On September 3, 2016, he was released by the Steelers as part of final roster cuts.

=== Baltimore Brigade ===
On March 13, 2019, Everett was assigned to the Baltimore Brigade. On April 24, 2019, Everett was placed on injured reserve.
