= Will Monday =

American football player (born 1992)

Profile
- Position: Punter

Personal information
- Born: July 25, 1992 (age 34); Flowery Branch, Georgia, U.S.
- Listed height: 6 ft 4 in (1.93 m)
- Listed weight: 210 lb (95 kg)

Career information
- High school: Flowery Branch (GA)
- College: Duke
- NFL draft: 2016: undrafted

Career history
- Pittsburgh Steelers (2016)*; Kansas City Chiefs (2017)*; Cincinnati Bengals (2017)*
- * Offseason or practice squad member only

Awards and highlights
- First-team All-ACC (2012); Second-team All-ACC (2013); 2× Third-team All-ACC (2014, 2015)
- Stats at Pro Football Reference

Will Monday (born July 25, 1992) is an American former football punter. He played college football at Duke and was signed by the Pittsburgh Steelers as an undrafted free agent in 2016. He also played for the Kansas City Chiefs and Cincinnati Bengals.

== College career ==
Monday was a four-time All-ACC selection (1st team in 2012; 2nd team in 2013; 3rd team in 2014; 3rd team in 2015) and a four-time Academic All-ACC selection (2012-13-14-15). In 53 games, he punted 260 times for 11,299 yards and a 46.46 yards per punt average. He downed 88 punts inside the opponent 20-yard line against 33 touchbacks. He completed four-of-five (.800) passing attempts for 41 yards.

Monday ended his college career with the highest punting average in Duke history, capping a career ranking seventh in ACC history in punting yardage and 10th in punting average. He ranked among the ACC’s top five in punting average in four consecutive seasons (1st in 2012; 5th in 2013; 3rd in 2014; 5th in 2015). In Duke single-season history, posted three of the top eight punting average marks (44.64/4th/2012; 43.48/6th/2015; 43.00/8th/2014). Monday registered the longest punt in Duke bowl game history with a 79-yard punt versus Cincinnati in the 2012 Belk Bowl. He represented Duke in the East-West Shrine Game on January 23, 2016, in St. Petersburg, Florida, and participated in the NFL Combine February 23–29, 2016, in Indianapolis.

== Professional career ==
=== Pittsburgh Steelers ===
Monday was signed as an undrafted free agent by the Pittsburgh Steelers on April 30, 2016 following the 2016 NFL draft. On August 28, 2016, he was waived by the Steelers.

=== Kansas City Chiefs ===
On May 9, 2017, Monday was signed by the Kansas City Chiefs. He was waived on July 6, 2017.

=== Cincinnati Bengals ===
On August 9, 2017, Monday was signed by the Cincinnati Bengals. He was waived on August 28, 2017.
