= Xavier Grimble =

American football player (born 1992)

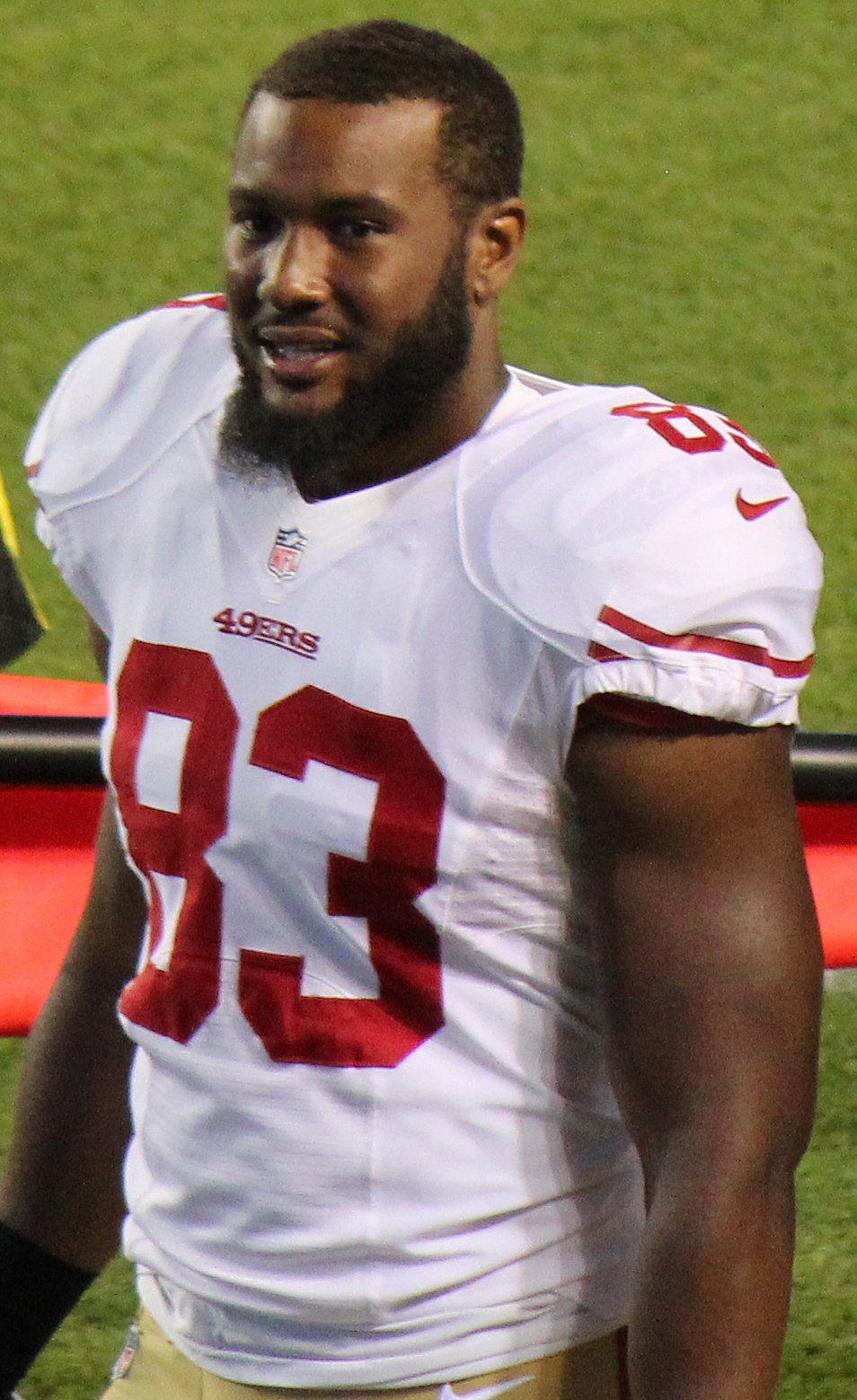
- Grimble with the San Francisco 49ers

No. 83, 85
- Position: Tight end

Personal information
- Born: September 22, 1992 (age 34); Las Vegas, Nevada, U.S.
- Listed height: 6 ft 4 in (1.93 m)
- Listed weight: 261 lb (118 kg)

Career information
- High school: Bishop Gorman (Las Vegas)
- College: USC (2010–2013)
- NFL draft: 2014: undrafted

Career history
- New York Giants (2014)*; San Francisco 49ers (2014)*; New England Patriots (2014)*; San Francisco 49ers (2014–2015)*; Pittsburgh Steelers (2016–2019); Indianapolis Colts (2020)*; Baltimore Ravens (2020)*
- * Offseason or practice squad member only

Career NFL statistics
- Receptions: 23
- Receiving yards: 239
- Receiving touchdowns: 3
- Stats at Pro Football Reference

Xavier Grimble (born September 22, 1992) is an American former professional football player who was a tight end in the National Football League (NFL). He played college football for the USC Trojans.

== High school ==
Grimble attended Bishop Gorman High School in Summerlin, Nevada. Named a USA Today All-American as a senior in 2009, he had 39 catches for 709 yards (18.2 avg.) with nine touchdowns, helping Bishop Gorman to a 15–0 record and victory in the state 4A title game. As a junior in 2008, he had 13 receptions for 310 yards (23.8 avg.) with four touchdowns. He was selected to play in the 2010 Under Armour All-America Game in St. Petersburg, Florida.

Considered a four-star recruit by Rivals.com, he was rated the best tight end prospect of his class. He committed to USC on April 24, 2009.

== College career ==
After redshirting as a true freshman in 2010, Grimble started seven games in 2011, recording 15 catches for 144 yards (9.6 avg.) with four touchdowns. In 2012, Grimble shared starts with fellow tight end Randall Telfer. He started in nine games, appearing in all 12, recording 29 catches for 316 yards (10.9 avg.) with five touchdowns, and was named an honorable mention All-Pac-12. In 2013, he caught 25 passes for 271 yards and two touchdowns, and was named an All-Pac-12 selection for the second consecutive season.

On January 7, 2014, Grimble announced he would forgo his remaining eligibility and enter the 2014 NFL draft.

== Professional career ==
Coming out of USC, analysts projected Grimble to be a seventh round selection or priority undrafted free agent. He was ranked as the 17th best tight end prospect available in the draft by DraftScout.com. Most analysts gave him positive reviews for his good hands, good frame, and ability to maintain possession while taking shots down the middle of the field.

Pre-draft measurables
Height	Weight	Arm length	Hand span	40-yard dash	10-yard split	20-yard split	20-yard shuttle	Three-cone drill	Vertical jump	Broad jump	Bench press
6 ft 4 1/4 in (1.94 m)	257 lb (117 kg)	33 5/8 in (0.85 m)	10 1/4 in (0.26 m)	4.90 s	1.70 s	2.85 s	4.79 s	7.41 s	30.5 in (0.77 m)	9 ft 5 in (2.87 m)	16 reps
All values from NFL Combine/USC's Pro Day

=== New York Giants ===
Grimble went undrafted in the 2014 NFL draft, but received contract offers as an undrafted free agent from the Washington Redskins, Atlanta Falcons, San Francisco 49ers, and New York Giants. On May 11, 2014, the Giants signed Grimble as an undrafted free agent. He entered training camp competing with Adrien Robinson, Larry Donnell, Daniel Fells, and Kellen Davis for the vacant starting tight end position left by the departures of Brandon Myers and Bear Pascoe. On August 24, the Giants waived Grimble.

=== San Francisco 49ers ===
On September 16, 2014, the San Francisco 49ers signed Grimble to their practice squad. On November 18, he was waived by the 49ers. On December 16, Grimble was re-signed to the 49ers' practice squad. On December 31, the 49ers signed Grimble to a two-year, $960,000 reserve/future contract

=== New England Patriots ===
On November 26, 2014, the New England Patriots signed Grimble to their practice squad, but released him two days later.

=== San Francisco 49ers (second stint) ===
On December 16, 2014, Grimble was signed to the San Francisco 49ers' practice squad. He signed a reserve/future contract with the 49ers on December 30. On September 5, 2015, Grimble was waived by the 49ers.

=== Pittsburgh Steelers ===
On January 18, 2016, the Pittsburgh Steelers signed Grimble to a one-year, $450,000 future/reserve contract.

He entered the Steelers training camp competing for the backup tight end position with David Johnson and Paul Lang. Grimble was named the Steelers' third tight end on their depth chart to begin the season, behind veterans Jesse James and David Johnson.

He made his professional regular season debut in the Steelers' season-opening 38–16 victory over the Washington Redskins. The following game, he made his first career catch and caught his first career touchdown reception on a 20-yard pass from Ben Roethlisberger in the 24–16 victory over the Cincinnati Bengals. In Week 3, he earned his first official career start during a 3–34 loss to the Philadelphia Eagles.

On February 8, 2017, Grimble signed a one-year deal to remain with the Steelers. Throughout training camp, Grimble competed with David Johnson and rookie Jake McGee for the backup tight end position. Although he showed more capability than both players, the Steelers traded for his former 49ers teammate Vance McDonald, making him the third tight end on their depth chart to begin the regular season. In the 2017 season, he appeared in 15 games and recorded five receptions for 32 receiving yards and one receiving touchdown.

In the 2018 season, Grimble appeared in all 16 games, of which he started two. He recorded six receptions for 86 receiving yards.

On March 5, 2019, the Steelers placed an original round tender on Grimble. He was placed on injured reserve on September 25, with a calf injury. He was released from injured reserve with an injury settlement on October 4. In the 2019 season, he had appeared in three games and had a single three-yard reception.

=== Indianapolis Colts ===
On December 30, 2019, Grimble signed a reserve/future contract with the Indianapolis Colts. On September 5, 2020, Grimble was waived by the Colts and re-signed with the team's practice squad the following day. Grimble was released by Indianapolis on September 8.

=== Baltimore Ravens ===
On September 16, 2020, Grimble was signed to the Baltimore Ravens' practice squad. He was placed on the practice squad/injured list on September 22, and activated back to the practice squad on November 3. Grimble was released by Baltimore on November 20.

== Personal life ==
Grimble's cousin, Jalen Grimble, played defensive tackle at Oregon State and his other cousin, Barkevious Mingo, is an NFL linebacker. During high school at Bishop Gorman, Grimble played with many talented football players including Baltimore Ravens offensive tackle Ronnie Stanley, Duke running back Shaq Powell, and Arizona quarterback Anu Solomon.
