= Caushaud Lyons =

American football player (born 1993)

No. 91
- Position: Defensive end

Personal information
- Born: January 3, 1993 (age 33); Ellenwood, Georgia, U.S.
- Listed height: 6 ft 5 in (1.96 m)
- Listed weight: 285 lb (129 kg)

Career information
- High school: Woodland (Stockbridge, Georgia)
- College: Tusculum
- NFL draft: 2015: undrafted

Career history
- Tampa Bay Buccaneers (2015)*; Pittsburgh Steelers (2015–2016); Tennessee Titans (2017)*; Los Angeles Rams (2017)*; Detroit Lions (2017)*; Chicago Bears (2017)*; Minnesota Vikings (2017–2018)*; Denver Broncos (2018)*; Washington Redskins (2018)*; Denver Broncos (2018–2019)*; Hamilton Tiger-Cats (2019)*; Houston Roughnecks (2020)
- * Offseason or practice squad member only
- Stats at Pro Football Reference

Caushaud Lyons (born January 3, 1993) is an American former professional football defensive end. He played college football at Tusculum.

== Professional career ==
=== Tampa Bay Buccaneers ===
Lyons was signed by the Buccaneers as an undrafted free agent on May 5, 2015. He was waived by the Buccaneers on September 5.

=== Pittsburgh Steelers ===
Lyons was claimed off waivers by the Pittsburgh Steelers on September 6, 2015. He was released on September 30 and then re-signed to the practice squad on October 2. On January 19, Lyons signed a futures contract with the Steelers.

On September 3, 2016, Lyons was released by the Steelers as part of final roster cuts. The next day he was re-signed to the Steelers' practice squad.

=== Tennessee Titans ===
On January 24, 2017, Lyons signed a futures contract with the Tennessee Titans. He was waived by the Titans on June 13.

=== Los Angeles Rams ===
On July 28, 2017, Lyons was signed by the Los Angeles Rams. He was waived by Los Angeles on August 22.

=== Detroit Lions ===
On August 23, 2017, Lyons was claimed off waivers by the Detroit Lions. He was waived by the Lions on September 2.

=== Chicago Bears ===
On December 12, 2017, Lyons was signed to the Chicago Bears' practice squad.

=== Minnesota Vikings ===
On January 9, 2018, Lyons was signed to the Minnesota Vikings' practice squad. He signed a reserve/future contract with the Vikings on January 22. Lyons was waived by Minnesota on May 7.

=== Denver Broncos ===
On June 15, 2018, Lyons signed with the Denver Broncos. He was waived by the Broncos on September 1.

=== Washington Redskins ===
Lyons signed with the Washington Redskins' practice squad on September 3, 2018, but was waived the following day.

=== Denver Broncos (second stint) ===
On November 27, 2018, Lyons was signed to the Denver Broncos' practice squad. On January, 2, 2019, Lyons was re-signed to reserve/future contract. He was waived by Denver on May 13.

=== Houston Roughnecks ===
Lyons was selected in the ninth round during phase three in the 2020 XFL draft by the Houston Roughnecks. He had his contract terminated when the league suspended operations on April 10, 2020.
