= Jermauria Rasco =

American football player (born 1992)

Mississippi State Bulldogs
- Title: Assistant defensive line coach

Personal information
- Born: October 5, 1992 (age 34); Shreveport, Louisiana, U.S.
- Listed height: 6 ft 4 in (1.93 m)
- Listed weight: 259 lb (117 kg)

Career information
- High school: Evangel Christian Academy (Shreveport, Louisiana)
- College: LSU
- NFL draft: 2015: undrafted

Career history

Playing
- Green Bay Packers (2015); Tampa Bay Buccaneers (2016)*; Pittsburgh Steelers (2016)*
- * Offseason or practice squad member only

Coaching
- Texas A&M (2017) Analyst; Arizona (2018–2020) Analyst; Louisiana (2021–2023) Player development coordinator; LSU (2024–2025) Defensive analyst; Mississippi State (2026–present) Assistant defensive line coach
- Stats at Pro Football Reference

Jermauria Rasco (born October 5, 1992) is an American former football linebacker. He was signed by the Green Bay Packers as an undrafted free agent in 2015 after not being selected in that year's NFL draft. He played college football at LSU.

== Early life ==
Rasco grew up in Shreveport, Louisiana. For high school he attended Evangel Christian Academy, and played on their football team. During his senior year in 2010, Rasco was a highly ranked high school prospect for colleges. Rivals.com ranked him as the eighth best defensive end recruit nationally, the ninth best prospect in the state of Louisiana, and the 168th ranked player nationally.

== College career ==
After high school, Rasco committed to play college football for the LSU Tigers. He played at LSU from 2011 through 2014, playing all four years in 48 games, with 26 starts. Rasco finished his college career with 154 career tackles, with the most coming his senior season, with 71 tackles in 2014.

== Professional career ==
=== Green Bay Packers ===
On May 8, 2015, Rasco signed with the Green Bay Packers. On September 5, 2015, Rasco was waived/injured. He was placed on injured reserve until he was released on December 29, 2015.

=== Tampa Bay Buccaneers ===
On February 5, 2016, Rasco was signed to a futures contract by the Tampa Bay Buccaneers. On April 29, 2016, he was waived.

=== Pittsburgh Steelers ===
On August 15, 2016, Rasco signed with the Pittsburgh Steelers. On September 3, 2016, he was released by the Steelers as part of final roster cuts.

== Coaching career ==
=== Arizona ===
In March 2019, Rasco joined the University of Arizona Football coaching staff under coach Kevin Sumlin as the team's Defensive Analyst.

=== Louisiana ===
As of 2023, he currently works as the player development coordinator for football for the Louisiana Ragin' Cajuns football team.

=== LSU ===
On March 20, 2024, Rasco was hired by his alma mater, LSU, as a defensive analyst.

=== Mississippi State ===
On February 11, 2026, Rasco was hired as the assistant defensive line coach for the Mississippi State Bulldogs.
