= Al-Hajj Shabazz =

American football player (born 1992)

Profile
- Position: Cornerback

Personal information
- Born: August 2, 1992 (age 34); Philadelphia, Pennsylvania, U.S.
- Listed height: 6 ft 1 in (1.85 m)
- Listed weight: 200 lb (91 kg)

Career information
- High school: John Bartram (Philadelphia)
- College: West Chester
- NFL draft: 2015: undrafted

Career history
- Indianapolis Colts (2015)*; Tampa Bay Buccaneers (2015)*; Pittsburgh Steelers (2016); Houston Texans (2016); Pittsburgh Steelers (2016); Baltimore Ravens (2017)*
- * Offseason or practice squad member only

Career NFL statistics
- Tackles: 1
- Sacks: 0
- Interceptions: 0
- Stats at Pro Football Reference

Al-Hajj Shabazz (born August 2, 1992) is an American former professional football player who was a cornerback in the National Football League (NFL). He played college football for the West Chester Golden Rams.

== College career ==
Shabazz played collegiately at Division II West Chester University under coach Bill Zwann. As a junior, he had four interceptions and returned one for a touchdown. As a senior, he led the Golden Rams in interceptions with five, pass breakups with 11, in addition to making 39 tackles. West Chester went 11-2 and Shabazz was named an All-American. He was invited to the NFL Player's Association Collegiate Bowl and recorded six tackles. He was one of 11 non-Division I players invited to the game.

== Professional career ==
=== Indianapolis Colts ===
Shabazz signed with the Indianapolis Colts in May 2015.

=== Tampa Bay Buccaneers ===
Shabazz signed with the Tampa Bay Buccaneers on July 29, 2015.

=== Pittsburgh Steelers ===
On February 4, 2016, Shabazz signed a futures contract with the Pittsburgh Steelers. On September 3, 2016, he was released by the Steelers as part of final roster cuts and was signed to the practice squad the next day. On October 8, 2016, he was promoted to the Steelers' active roster. On October 9, 2016, he made his professional regular season debut against the New York Jets and recorded his first career tackle. He was released on October 15, 2016 and was re-signed to the practice squad. He was promoted back to the active roster on November 5, 2016. He was released again on December 3, 2016.

=== Houston Texans ===
On December 5, 2016, Shabazz was claimed off waivers by the Houston Texans. He was waived on December 17, 2016.

=== Pittsburgh Steelers (second stint) ===
On December 20, 2016, Shabazz was re-signed to Pittsburgh's practice squad. He was promoted to the active roster on December 24, 2016. He was released by the Steelers on May 2, 2017.

=== Baltimore Ravens ===
On June 5, 2017, Shabazz signed with the Baltimore Ravens. He was waived/injured on August 7, 2017, and was placed on injured reserve. He was released on August 11, 2017.
