= Demarcus Ayers =

American football player (born 1994)

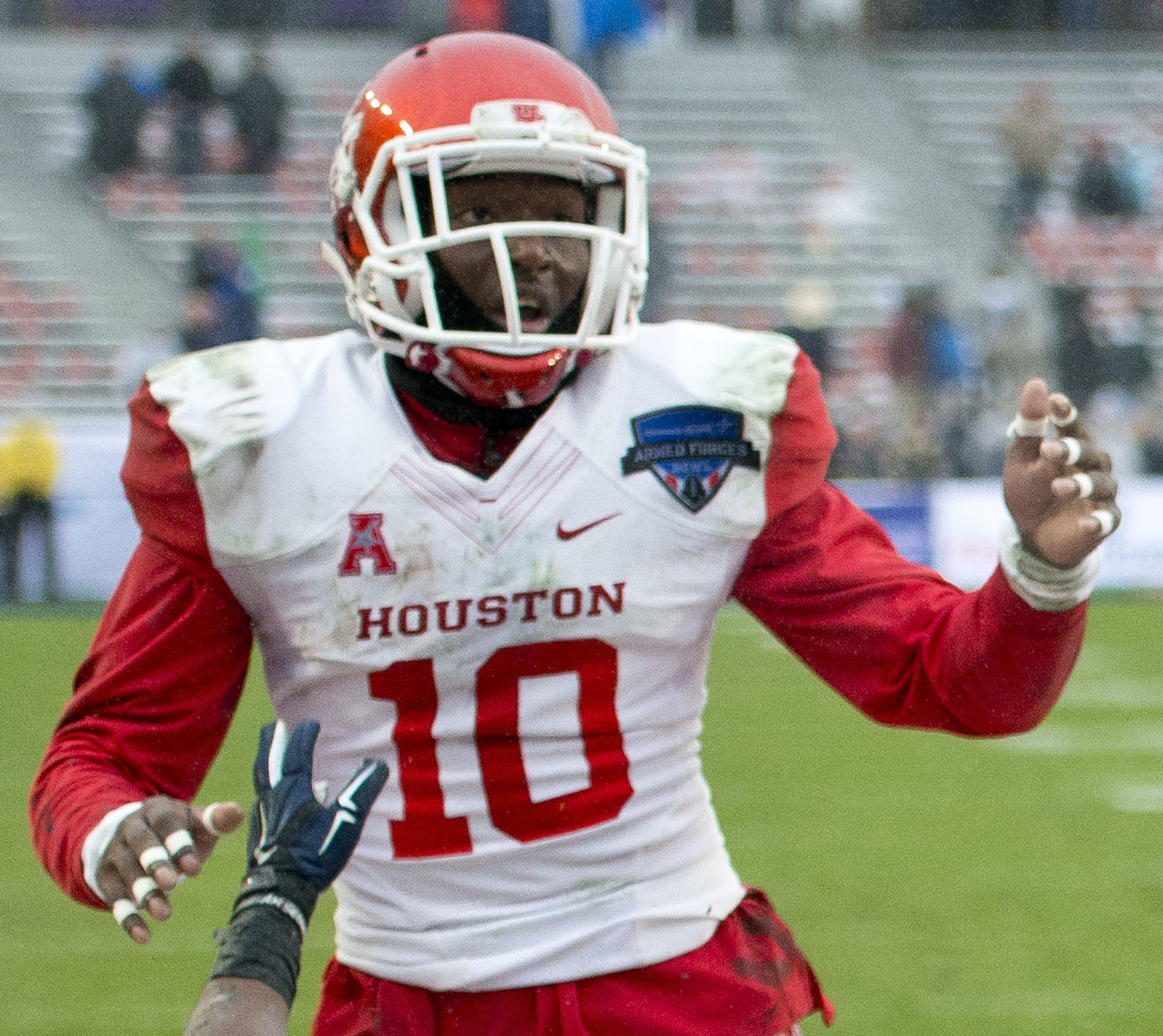
- Ayers with Houston in 2015

North Texas Mean Green
- Title: Offensive quality control coach

Personal information
- Born: July 7, 1994 (age 32); Dallas, Texas, U.S.
- Listed height: 5 ft 9 in (1.75 m)
- Listed weight: 182 lb (83 kg)

Career information
- High school: Lancaster (Lancaster, Texas)
- College: Houston
- NFL draft: 2016: 7th round, 229th overall pick

Career history

Playing
- Pittsburgh Steelers (2016); New England Patriots (2017)*; Chicago Bears (2017–2018)*; San Antonio Commanders (2019); New York Guardians (2020)*; Saskatchewan Roughriders (2020–2021)*
- * Offseason or practice squad member only

Coaching
- Lancaster HS (TX) (2019–2020) Assistant wide receivers coach; New Mexico (2021) Quality control assistant; Indiana (2022) Graduate assistant; North Texas (2023–present) Offensive quality control coach

Awards and highlights
- 2× First-team All-AAC (2013, 2015); AAC Co-Special Teams Player of the Year (2013)

Career NFL statistics
- Receptions: 6
- Receiving yards: 53
- Receiving touchdowns: 1
- Stats at Pro Football Reference

Demarcus Ayers (born July 7, 1994) is an American college football coach. He is the offensive quality control coach at North Texas. He is a former professional football player who was a wide receiver in the National Football League (NFL), Canadian Football League (CFL), Alliance of American Football (AAF), and XFL. He played college football for the Houston Cougars, and was selected by the Pittsburgh Steelers in the seventh round of the 2016 NFL draft.

== College career ==
At the University of Houston, Ayers was the Cougars' starting kick returner in his freshman season and was named to the 2013 American Athletic Conference (AAC) First-team as a kick returner. He had 37 returns for 1,021 yards, breaking a Houston freshman record.

In 2014, in his sophomore season, he had 33 receptions for 335 yards and two touchdowns at receiver. He also made 34 returns for 592 yards at kick returner.

In 2015, in his junior season, Ayers led the AAC in receptions with 97 and ranked sixth in the nation in receptions. He totaled 1,221 receiving yards, 18th in the nation. He was named to the AAC first-team at both wide receiver and kick returner.

=== Statistics ===
| Year | Team | Receiving | | | | |
| Year | Team | GP | Rec | Yds | Avg | TD |
|---|---|---|---|---|---|---|
| 2013 | Houston | 13 | 11 | 130 | 11.8 | 1 |
| 2014 | Houston | 13 | 33 | 335 | 10.2 | 2 |
| 2015 | Houston | 14 | 97 | 1,221 | 12.6 | 6 |
| Career | | 40 | 141 | 1,686 | 12.0 | 9 |

== Professional career ==
=== Pre-draft ===
Coming out of college, Ayers was projected by many analysts to not be selected in the 2016 NFL draft. He was ranked the 53rd best wide receiver out of the 414 available by NFLDraftScout.com. He was invited to the NFL Combine and did the majority of the workout and positional drills. He was unable to do the 20-yard shuttle, 3-cone drill, and the bench press because of an injury to his hand and finger. He participated at Houston's Pro Day and chose to try to improve on his combine numbers and did all of the drills and workouts besides the bench and improved on everything except the broad jump.

Pre-draft measurables
| Height | Weight | Arm length | Hand span | 40-yard dash | 10-yard split | 20-yard split | 20-yard shuttle | Three-cone drill | Vertical jump | Broad jump |
|---|---|---|---|---|---|---|---|---|---|---|
| 5 ft 9 3/8 in (1.76 m) | 182 lb (83 kg) | 31 1/4 in (0.79 m) | 9 1/4 in (0.23 m) | 4.66 s | 1.60 s | 2.65 s | 4.33 s | 7.00 s | 35 in (0.89 m) | 10 ft 3 in (3.12 m) |
All values from NFL Combine and Houston's Pro Day

=== Pittsburgh Steelers ===
Ayers was drafted by the Pittsburgh Steelers in the seventh round, 229th overall, in the 2016 NFL draft. The seventh round pick used to select Ayers was traded from the New York Giants to the Steelers in exchange for punter Brad Wing. On May 5, 2016, Ayers signed a four-year contract with the Steelers. On September 3, 2016, he was released by the Steelers as part of final roster cuts and was signed to the practice squad the next day. On December 12, 2016, he was promoted to the active roster. Ayers made his professional debut on December 25, 2016, and caught his first career reception on a nine-yard pass from Ben Roethlisberger, helping the Steelers defeat the Baltimore Ravens 31–27. The following week, he earned his first career start in a 27–24 overtime win over the Cleveland Browns and caught a season-high five passes for 44 receiving yards and caught his first career touchdown on an 11-yard pass from Landry Jones.

On September 2, 2017, Ayers was waived by the Steelers after only one season.

=== New England Patriots ===
On September 4, 2017, Ayers was signed to the New England Patriots' practice squad. He was released on September 23, 2017.

=== Chicago Bears ===
On November 23, 2017, Ayers was signed to the Chicago Bears' practice squad. He signed a reserve/future contract with the Bears on January 1, 2018. He was waived by the team on September 1, 2018.

=== San Antonio Commanders ===
On November 9, 2018, Ayers signed with the San Antonio Commanders of the Alliance of American Football (AAF) for the 2019 season. The league ceased operations in April 2019.

=== New York Guardians ===
Ayers was drafted by the New York Guardians of the XFL in the 5th round of the 2020 XFL draft. He was waived before the start of the regular season on January 28, 2020.

=== Saskatchewan Roughriders ===
Ayers signed with the Saskatchewan Roughriders of the Canadian Football League (CFL) on February 19, 2020. After the CFL canceled the 2020 season due to the COVID-19 pandemic, Ayers chose to opt-out of his contract with the Roughriders on August 25, 2020. He opted back in to his contract on January 20, 2021. He was released on July 3, 2021.
