= Ben Roethlisberger =

American football player (born 1982)

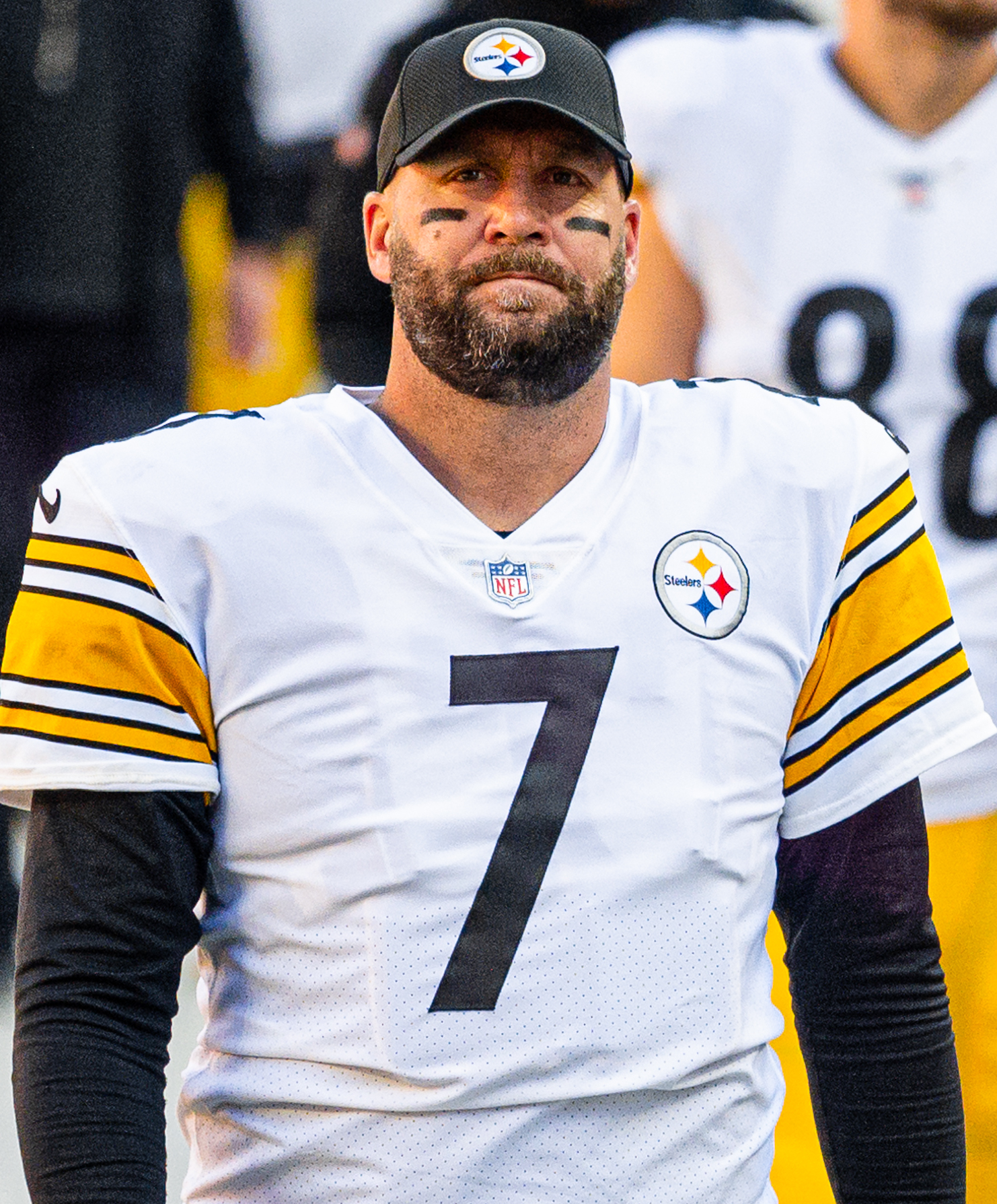
- Roethlisberger with the Pittsburgh Steelers in 2021

No. 7
- Position: Quarterback

Personal information
- Born: March 2, 1982 (age 44); Lima, Ohio, U.S.
- Listed height: 6 ft 5 in (1.96 m)
- Listed weight: 240 lb (109 kg)

Career information
- High school: Findlay (Findlay, Ohio)
- College: Miami (OH) (2000–2003)
- NFL draft: 2004: 1st round, 11th overall pick

Career history
- Pittsburgh Steelers (2004–2021)

Awards and highlights
- 2× Super Bowl champion (XL, XLIII); NFL Offensive Rookie of the Year (2004); 6× Pro Bowl (2007, 2011, 2014–2017); 2× NFL passing yards leader (2014, 2018); Pittsburgh Steelers Hall of Honor; Third-team All-American (2003); MAC Most Valuable Player (2003); MAC Offensive Player of the Year (2003); MAC Freshman of the Year (2001); 2× Second-team All-MAC (2001, 2002); Miami RedHawks No. 7 retired; NFL records: Career 500-yard passing games: 4; Completions in a game: 47; Wins in a season by a rookie quarterback: 13 (tied)

Career NFL statistics
- Passing attempts: 8,443
- Passing completions: 5,440
- Completion percentage: 64.4%
- TD–INT: 418–211
- Passing yards: 64,088
- Passer rating: 93.5
- Stats at Pro Football Reference

Benjamin Todd Roethlisberger Sr. (/ˈrɒθlɪsbɜːrɡər/ ROTH-liss-BUR-gur; born March 2, 1982), nicknamed "Big Ben", is an American former professional football quarterback who played in the National Football League (NFL) for 18 seasons with the Pittsburgh Steelers. He played college football for the Miami RedHawks, and was selected by the Steelers in the first round (11th overall) of the 2004 NFL draft.

Roethlisberger earned the AP NFL Offensive Rookie of the Year Award in 2004 and his first Pro Bowl selection in 2007. In 2006, he became the youngest Super Bowl–winning quarterback in NFL history, winning Super Bowl XL in his second season at the age of 23. Roethlisberger led the Steelers to a second Super Bowl title in four seasons in Super Bowl XLIII. In 2011, his third and final career Super Bowl appearance Super Bowl XLV, the Steelers lost 31 to 25 to the Green Bay Packers.

Roethlisberger was one of the most prolific passers in NFL history. Upon retirement, he ranked 5th all-time in NFL career passing yards (64,088), 8th all-time in touchdowns (418), and 5th in completions (5,440) among quarterbacks with a minimum of 1,500 career attempts. He also had the fourth-highest career winning percentage (.710) as a starter in the regular season among quarterbacks with a minimum of 100 starts and was one of only six quarterbacks in NFL history to have beaten at least 31 of the current 32 NFL teams.

Known for playing outside the passing pocket in what he calls "backyard football", Roethlisberger grew up idolizing John Elway and has often been compared to him, wearing number 7 in his honor.

== Early life ==
Roethlisberger was born in Lima, Ohio, the son of Ida Jane (née Foust) and Kenneth Todd "Ken" Roethlisberger. His father is a former pitcher and quarterback at Georgia Tech. He is of part Swiss descent; his surname, Roethlisberger (Swiss-German spelling: Röthlisberger), is of Swiss origin, with roots in Geissbühl, a farming hamlet in the municipality of Lauperswil, Switzerland. His younger sister, Carlee Roethlisberger, played basketball for the University of Oklahoma.

At Findlay High School in Findlay, Ohio, Roethlisberger was captain of the Trojans' football, basketball, and baseball teams. Roethlisberger did not play quarterback until his senior year, giving way to the coach's son, Ryan Hite. Instead, Roethlisberger played wide receiver. "I'm a nationally known knucklehead in many people's eyes," Hite conceded in a 2004 interview to the Toledo Blade, but insisted his decision had not been an act of nepotism, or miscalculation. "We did a bunch of drills and my son throwing to Ben was a better combination," he said.

Ken Roethlisberger, a former Georgia Tech quarterback, never publicly criticized Hite for playing Ryan ahead of his son Ben. He has stated, "It was a coach's call. You make good ones, you make bad ones. And I'm not even saying this was a bad one. We can say it was now, but how do we know for sure?" Ryan Hite went on to Denison University where, as a wide receiver, he set numerous career and single-season records by the time he graduated from college.

== College career ==
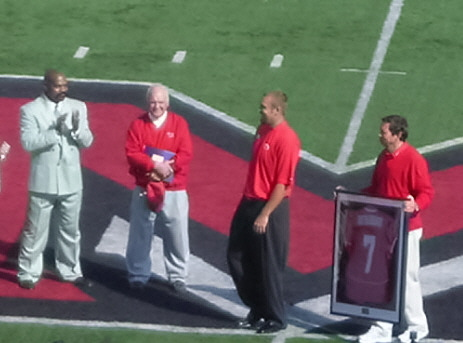
Roethlisberger's Miami RedHawks jersey number being retired in 2007

=== 2000–2001 ===
Roethlisberger played college quarterback at Miami University in Oxford, Ohio. After arriving at Miami in 2000, he was redshirted his first season. In the 2001 season, he made his collegiate debut against Michigan, completing 18 of 35 passes for 193 yards and two touchdowns in the 31–13 loss. Against Akron, he broke the school single-game passing record with 399 passing yards, with 70 of those yards coming on a Hail Mary to Eddie Tillitz to win the game by a score of 30–27 as time expired. When Miami played Bowling Green, he had two touchdowns and 305 passing yards and broke the MAC freshman passing yardage record in the 24–21 victory. Against Hawaii, he broke school records for attempts, completions, and yardage, when he went 40 of 53 for 452 yards and three touchdowns in the 52–51 loss. He finished his first year with the Redhawks with 3,105 passing yards, 241 completions, and 25 touchdown completions while leading them to a 7–5 record.

=== 2002 ===
Roethlisberger's second season as the RedHawks starter was marked with a 7–5 record once again. He broke the MAC single-game record for passing yards in a 48–41 loss against Northern Illinois on October 12 when he threw for 525 yards and four touchdowns. He won the MAC East Special Teams Player of the Week for three punts that landed inside the 20 in the 27–13 victory over Toledo. He established the Miami single-season record with 3,238 passing yards and 271 completions in 2002.

=== 2003 ===
After starting the season with a loss to the Iowa Hawkeyes, Roethlisberger led the Miami RedHawks to an unbeaten record in the MAC, 12 consecutive wins, a #10 ranking in the Associated Press poll, and a 49–28 victory over Louisville in the 2003 GMAC Bowl. He finished his 2003 season with a conference-leading 343 completions, 4,486 passing yards, and 37 passing touchdowns, breaking school single-season records in all three categories. He was named as the MAC Offensive Player of the Year for the 2003 season.

His jersey number 7 was retired by the RedHawks during homecoming on October 13, 2007; the festivities included the RedHawks football game against Bowling Green. Roethlisberger became the third athlete in Miami football history to have his number retired, joining John Pont and Bob Hitchens. Roethlisberger's number being retired was the first time in 34 years Miami retired a football jersey number.

== Professional career ==
Pre-draft measurables
Height	Weight	Arm length	Hand span	40-yard dash	20-yard shuttle	Three-cone drill	Vertical jump	Wonderlic
6 ft 4 7/8 in (1.95 m)	241 lb (109 kg)	31 1/2 in (0.80 m)	9 3/8 in (0.24 m)	4.81 s	4.32 s	6.83 s	30.0 in (0.76 m)	25
All values from NFL Combine

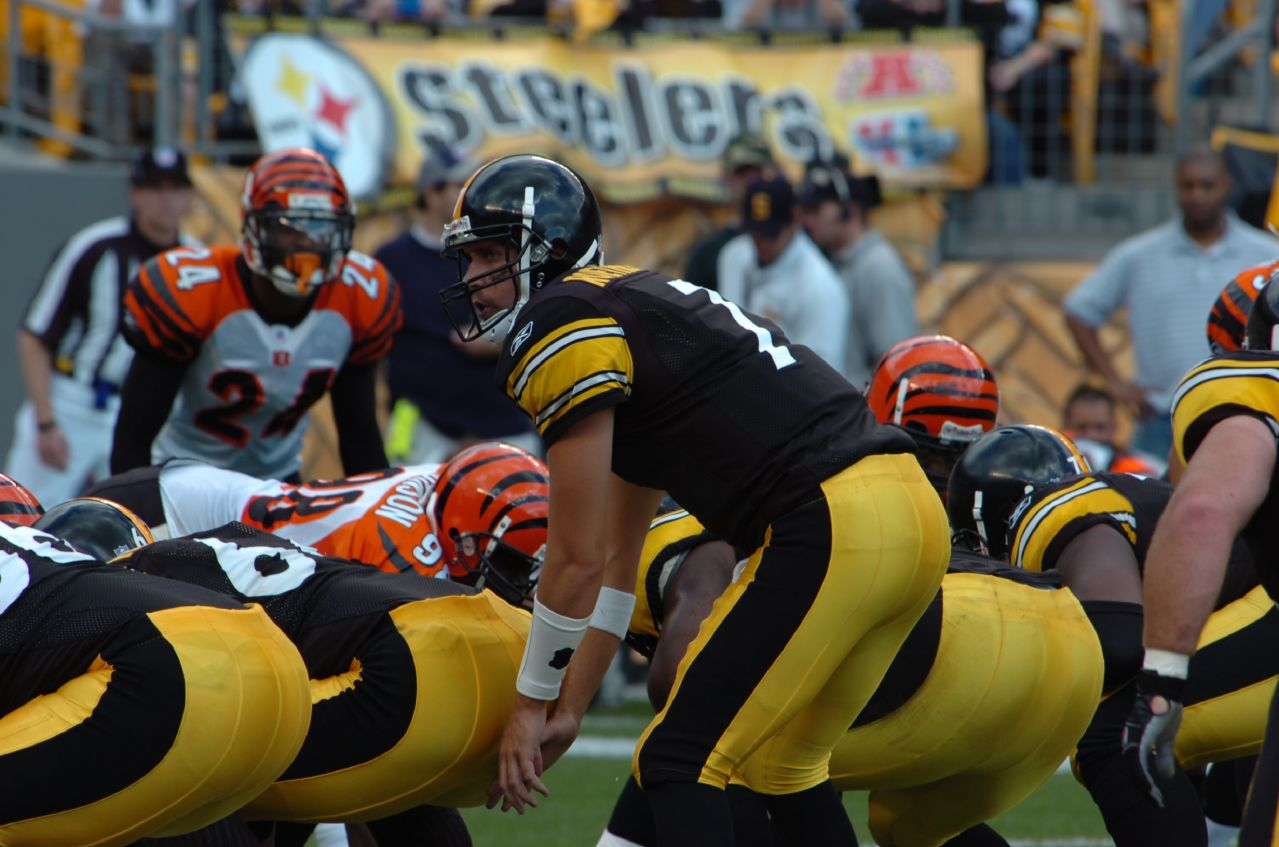
Roethlisberger takes a snap against the Bengals in 2006

When ESPN began broadcasting MAC games on Tuesdays and Wednesdays—days without other football on television—in 2000, nationwide "MACtion" audiences watched Roethlisberger's teams. The success of the 2003 Miami Redhawks led to the expectation that he would be drafted early. At the combine, Roethlisberger scored a 25 on the Wonderlic. During the GMAC Bowl, commentators discussed some of his skills that would translate to success in the NFL. Roethlisberger was one of the players invited to attend the draft along with others in the "Green Room" and was featured on the show Hey Rookie, Welcome to the NFL.

During the 2004 NFL draft, Roethlisberger was the second-highest touted quarterback behind Ole Miss' Eli Manning. He was projected to be taken by the New York Giants as the fourth overall pick, with the San Diego Chargers taking Manning first overall. While the Chargers drafted Manning, the Giants instead selected NC State quarterback Philip Rivers as part of a trade deal that sent Manning to the Giants and Rivers to the Chargers. The Pittsburgh Steelers selected Roethlisberger 11th overall, making him the highest-drafted quarterback to play for the team that picked him, and the highest draft pick the Steelers used on a quarterback since selecting Terry Bradshaw first overall in 1970.

The Steelers almost didn't select Roethlisberger, as head coach Bill Cowher and director of football operations Kevin Colbert had planned to select Arkansas guard Shawn Andrews. However, Steelers owner Dan Rooney overrode both Cowher and Colbert upon seeing that Roethlisberger was still available and the Steelers not wanting a repeat of passing on a franchise quarterback, as they had done in the 1983 NFL draft when they drafted Gabriel Rivera while local product Dan Marino was still available. Roethlisberger was being interviewed live on ESPN by Suzy Kolber when he received the phone call from Cowher, confirming his selection before it was officially announced by Paul Tagliabue.

Roethlisberger was one of 17 quarterbacks taken in the 2004 NFL draft, along with Manning and Rivers. All three would enjoy lengthy and successful careers with the teams that signed them and have been compared favorably to the aforementioned 1983 draft, which included Hall of Fame quarterbacks John Elway, Jim Kelly, and Marino. A two-time Super Bowl winner and six-time Pro Bowler, Roethlisberger leads the three in wins, winning percentage, and postseason appearances, and had the longest career among them.

=== 2004 ===
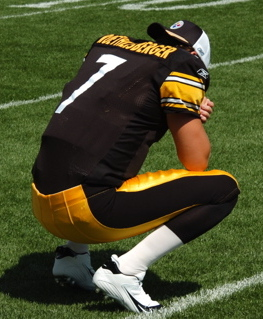
Roethlisberger before a game at Heinz Field

On August 4, Roethlisberger signed a six-year contract to the Steelers worth $22.26 million in salaries and bonuses, with an additional $17.73 million available via incentives. He was touted by Steelers head coach Bill Cowher in a press conference as a franchise quarterback.

He started his rookie season as the third quarterback on the depth chart behind veterans Tommy Maddox and Charlie Batch. When Batch was injured in the preseason, however, Roethlisberger took over the backup quarterback role. Maddox started, and won, the season opener against the Oakland Raiders and started versus the Baltimore Ravens, but after an ineffective outing and third-quarter injury to Maddox, Roethlisberger stepped in for his first NFL action. Despite spurring a mild comeback, the Steelers lost to the Ravens by a score of 30–13. In his regular season debut against the Ravens, Roethlisberger completed 12 of 20 passes for 176-yards and two touchdowns, and two interceptions. During the game, he threw his first career touchdown, on a three-yard pass to Antwaan Randle El and also threw his first career interception to Ravens linebacker Adalius Thomas. Maddox's injury changed the Steelers' initial plan for Roethlisberger, which was for him to sit on the bench or play sparingly during the first season or two in order to learn the team's system. Instead, he started the third game of the season against the Miami Dolphins, finishing the 13–3 victory with 12 of 22 completions, 163 passing yards, one touchdown, and an interception. In Week 6, in a 24–20 victory over the Dallas Cowboys, he was 21 of 25 for 193 passing yards and two touchdowns to earn his first AFC Offensive Player of the Week honor.

As a rookie, he went 13–0 in the regular season (14–1 including playoffs) as a starting quarterback, helping the Steelers become the first AFC team to have 15 wins (2–1 under Maddox [first two and last game], 13–0 under Roethlisberger) in a single regular season, surpassing former Steeler Mike Kruczek for the record for the best start by a rookie (6–0) and exceeding the mark for total wins as a rookie, set by Chris Chandler and Joe Ferguson. On January 5, Roethlisberger was unanimously selected as the NFL Offensive Rookie of the Year by the Associated Press, the first quarterback in 34 years to be so honored. In addition, he was named to the NFL All-Rookie Team.

On October 31, he had one of his biggest games, leading the Steelers to a 34–20 victory over the defending Super Bowl champion and previously undefeated New England Patriots, ending their NFL-record 21-game winning streak. He completed 18 of 24 pass attempts for 196 yards, two touchdowns, and no turnovers. The next game, the Steelers defeated the also previously undefeated Philadelphia Eagles 27–3, with Roethlisberger going 11 of 18 for 183 yards, with two touchdowns and one interception.

On December 5, he led the Steelers to a 17–16 victory over the Jacksonville Jaguars. He was near-perfect on the night, completing 14 of 17 passes for 226 yards and two touchdowns. Jeff Reed's 37-yard field goal in the final minute gave the Steelers and Roethlisberger their tenth straight win.

Two weeks later, Roethlisberger faced off against the New York Giants and the first overall pick of the 2004 draft, Eli Manning. Roethlisberger posted his first career 300-yard passing game, with 18 of 28 passes for 316 yards and a touchdown. He led his fifth game-winning drive of the season, capping a drive with a Jerome Bettis touchdown run for a 33–30 victory.

In the Divisional Round of the playoffs against the New York Jets, Roethlisberger threw two interceptions. One interception was returned for a touchdown, and the other was thrown with 2:03 left in the fourth quarter, which set up a potential game-winning field goal by Jets kicker Doug Brien. Brien missed the kick as time expired (his second missed kick in the last two minutes of the game), forcing the game into overtime. In overtime, Roethlisberger led the Steelers down the field and put them in position for the game-winning field goal, a 33-yard attempt that was made by Jeff Reed, sending the Steelers into the AFC Championship for the fourth time in 10 years.

On January 23 in the AFC Championship Game in Pittsburgh, Roethlisberger completed 14 of 24 pass attempts for 226 yards and two touchdowns, but he also threw three costly interceptions, one of which was returned 87 yards for a touchdown by Rodney Harrison. The Steelers lost the game to the eventual Super Bowl champions, the New England Patriots, by a score of 41–27.

=== 2005: First Super Bowl championship ===
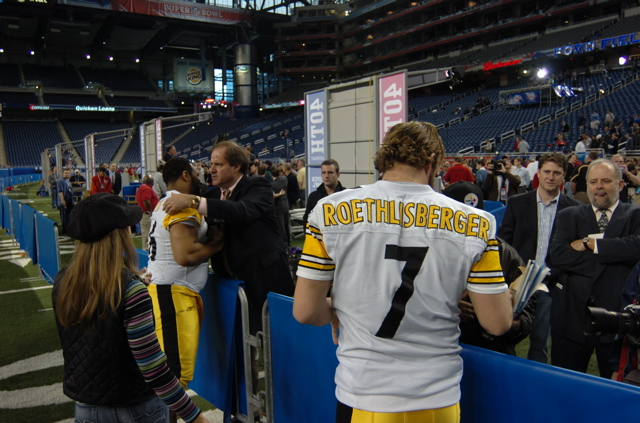
Roethlisberger signs autographs at Super Bowl XL media day

In the 2005 regular season, the Steelers finished with an 11–5 record. After securing an AFC Wild Card spot en route to victory in the Super Bowl, the Steelers pulled off upsets at Indianapolis and Denver in the AFC playoffs in addition to wins over the higher seed Cincinnati Bengals and Seattle Seahawks.

During the course of the regular 2005 season, Roethlisberger missed four games due to various knee injuries. The Steelers went 9–3 with Roethlisberger at quarterback and 2–2 without him. He led the league in yards per attempt, with an 8.90, and finished third in passer rating behind Peyton Manning and Carson Palmer with a 98.6.

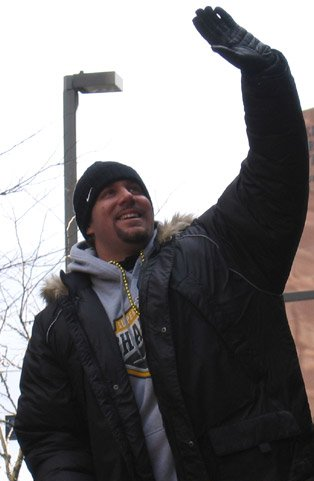
Roethlisberger at the Super Bowl Parade

The Super Bowl run began on January 8 as Roethlisberger helped lead the Steelers to a Wild Card Round playoff win over the Cincinnati Bengals—an AFC North rival that had beaten the Steelers by seven points in the regular season to win the division championship. The rematch featured two teams with identical records, having split their regular season series since each team won on the road. Early in the game on Carson Palmer's first throw, a tackle by former Bengal Kimo von Oelhoffen resulted in Palmer's anterior cruciate ligament (ACL) being completely torn. The Bengals' backup quarterback, Jon Kitna, came in and led the Bengals to leads of 10–0 and 17–7. However, the 17–7 lead midway through the second quarter was the last time in the 2005 postseason that the Steelers trailed an opponent by more than three points. After Kitna failed to produce, the Steelers took advantage by taking the next 24 straight points, and the win, in a 31–17 victory in Cincinnati.

Their second road win came on January 15 when Roethlisberger led the Steelers against the Indianapolis Colts in the Divisional Round, the NFL's top team throughout the season and a heavy favorite to represent the AFC in Super Bowl XL. Roethlisberger threw for 197 yards and recorded a game-saving tackle on Colts' defensive back Nick Harper, who had just recovered a Jerome Bettis fumble with less than two minutes left in the game. Pittsburgh led early, but had to survive a Colts comeback to win 21–18, after an errant call that the NFL later admitted was a mistake, which overturned a Troy Polamalu interception that would have secured the game for the Steelers. Roethlisberger's tackle on Harper, dubbed by many as The Tackle II or The Immaculate Redemption, was compared by many to "The Immaculate Reception" in 1972, when Franco Harris made a miraculous reception and scored the game-winning touchdown against the Oakland Raiders. The victory marked the first time in playoff history that a sixth-seeded NFL playoff team defeated the top-seeded team.

On January 22, 2006, the Steelers defeated the Denver Broncos by a score of 34–17 in Denver to win the AFC Championship and advance to Super Bowl XL. Roethlisberger completed 21 of 29 passes for 275 yards and threw two touchdown passes and scored one touchdown himself on a four-yard play-action bootleg. His run was the last touchdown of the game, sealing the win for the Steelers.

The Steelers won Super Bowl XL 21–10 over the Seattle Seahawks in Detroit on February 5. Roethlisberger had one of the worst passing games of his career, completing just nine of 21 passes for 123 yards and two interceptions; his passer rating of 22.6 was the lowest in Super Bowl history by a winning quarterback. Though he did convert eight third-down situations in the game to help the Steelers win, none of them was bigger than his 37-yard pass to Super Bowl XL MVP Hines Ward on a third-and-28 that set up the Steelers' first touchdown (a one-yard quarterback sneak by Roethlisberger on third and goal). With the victory, Roethlisberger, at 23 years old, became the youngest quarterback to win the Super Bowl, a record previously held by Tom Brady of the New England Patriots.

=== 2006 ===
After an off-season motorcycle crash in which he was seriously injured, Roethlisberger missed the opening game of the 2006 season after having an emergency appendectomy on September 3. Backup Charlie Batch started and led the Steelers to a victory over the Miami Dolphins. Roethlisberger played the following game against the Jacksonville Jaguars. His return resulted in a sub-par performance as he threw two interceptions with no touchdowns in a 9–0 loss. In Week 3, Roethlisberger completed fewer than half of his passes for three interceptions and no touchdowns in a 28–20 loss to the Cincinnati Bengals. The final interception came in the final seconds of the game, in the end zone, ending Pittsburgh's comeback attempt.

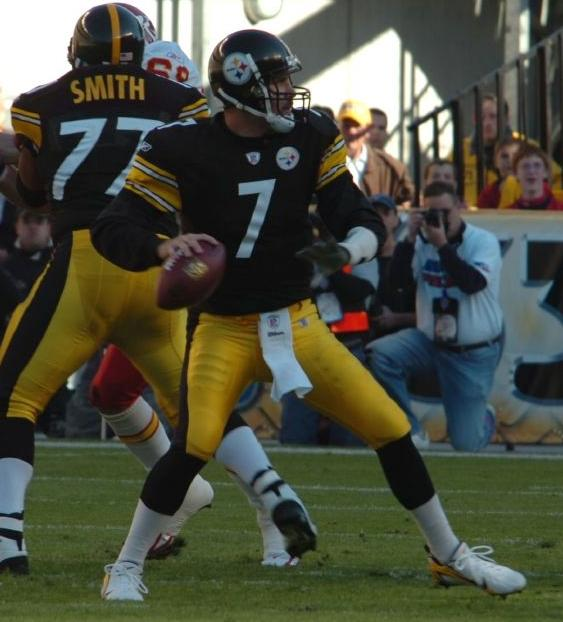
Roethlisberger drops back against the Kansas City Chiefs in 2006

In Week 5 against the San Diego Chargers, Roethlisberger looked sharp throughout the first half, leading three scoring drives. However, in the second half, he threw two interceptions, both of which shifted momentum away from the Steelers and led to the Chargers' 23–13 win. In Week 6 against the Kansas City Chiefs, Roethlisberger had his first big game of the season, completing 16 of 19 passes for 238 yards with two touchdowns (his first of the year) and no interceptions during a 45–7 rout of the Chiefs. During Week 7 in Atlanta, Roethlisberger continued his success, going 16 of 22 for 237 yards and three touchdowns. However, during the third quarter, Roethlisberger was helped off the field after sustaining a concussion following a controversial hit by Falcons defensive end Patrick Kerney. Roethlisberger was replaced by Charlie Batch, and the Steelers went on to lose 41–38 in overtime.

On October 29 against the Oakland Raiders, Roethlisberger threw four interceptions in a 20–13 upset loss. The loss was his fifth of the season—two more than he had in his first two seasons combined as a starter—and gave him a total of 11 interceptions, versus just six touchdowns, on the season. In a Week 9 rematch of the 2005 AFC Championship against the Denver Broncos, Roethlisberger threw for a career-high 433 yards, but had three of the six Steelers turnovers in a 31–20 loss. Roethlisberger and the Steelers got back on a winning track in a home game a week later against the New Orleans Saints. He passed for 265 yards and three touchdowns in a 38–31 win.

In Week 11, Roethlisberger overcame three first-half interceptions by throwing for 224 yards and two touchdowns in the fourth quarter, leading the Steelers to score 21 points and come back to beat the Cleveland Browns, 24–20. The following week, Roethlisberger and the Steelers were held scoreless in a 27–0 loss to the Baltimore Ravens. Roethlisberger finished 21 of 41 for 214 yards and two interceptions. He was sacked nine times, including once by Ravens linebacker Bart Scott, which sent him to the sidelines briefly. He also fumbled once, which the Ravens returned for a touchdown in the second half. Roethlisberger bounced back the following game, throwing for 198 yards and two touchdowns in a 20–3 victory over the Tampa Bay Buccaneers.

Pittsburgh kept their playoff hopes alive in Week 14 with a 27–7 victory against the Browns. Roethlisberger went 11 of 21 for 225 yards with one touchdown, and rushed for one more. In Week 15, Roethlisberger threw for 140 yards and a touchdown in a 37–3 rout of the Carolina Panthers. The following week, Baltimore eliminated Pittsburgh from the playoffs. In the 31–7 defeat, Roethlisberger was intercepted twice and threw for 156 yards.

Roethlisberger ended the season on a good note by defeating the Cincinnati Bengals by a score of 23–17 in overtime and eliminating them from playoff contention in what was Bill Cowher's final game as the Steelers' head coach. He was 19 for 28 passing with 280 yards, one touchdown, and one interception. In overtime, Roethlisberger completed a slant pass to rookie Santonio Holmes, who went 67 yards for the game-winning touchdown.

=== 2007 ===
In Week 1 against the Cleveland Browns, Roethlisberger threw four touchdown passes in a game for the first time in his NFL career as he led the Steelers to a win in the debut of new Steelers head coach Mike Tomlin. Against the Arizona Cardinals in Week 4, Roethlisberger looked to get a win over his former offensive coordinator Ken Whisenhunt, who was then the head coach of the Cardinals. However, Roethlisberger had his first loss of the season as he was intercepted twice; once in the red zone, and then on a desperation pass with six seconds left in the game.

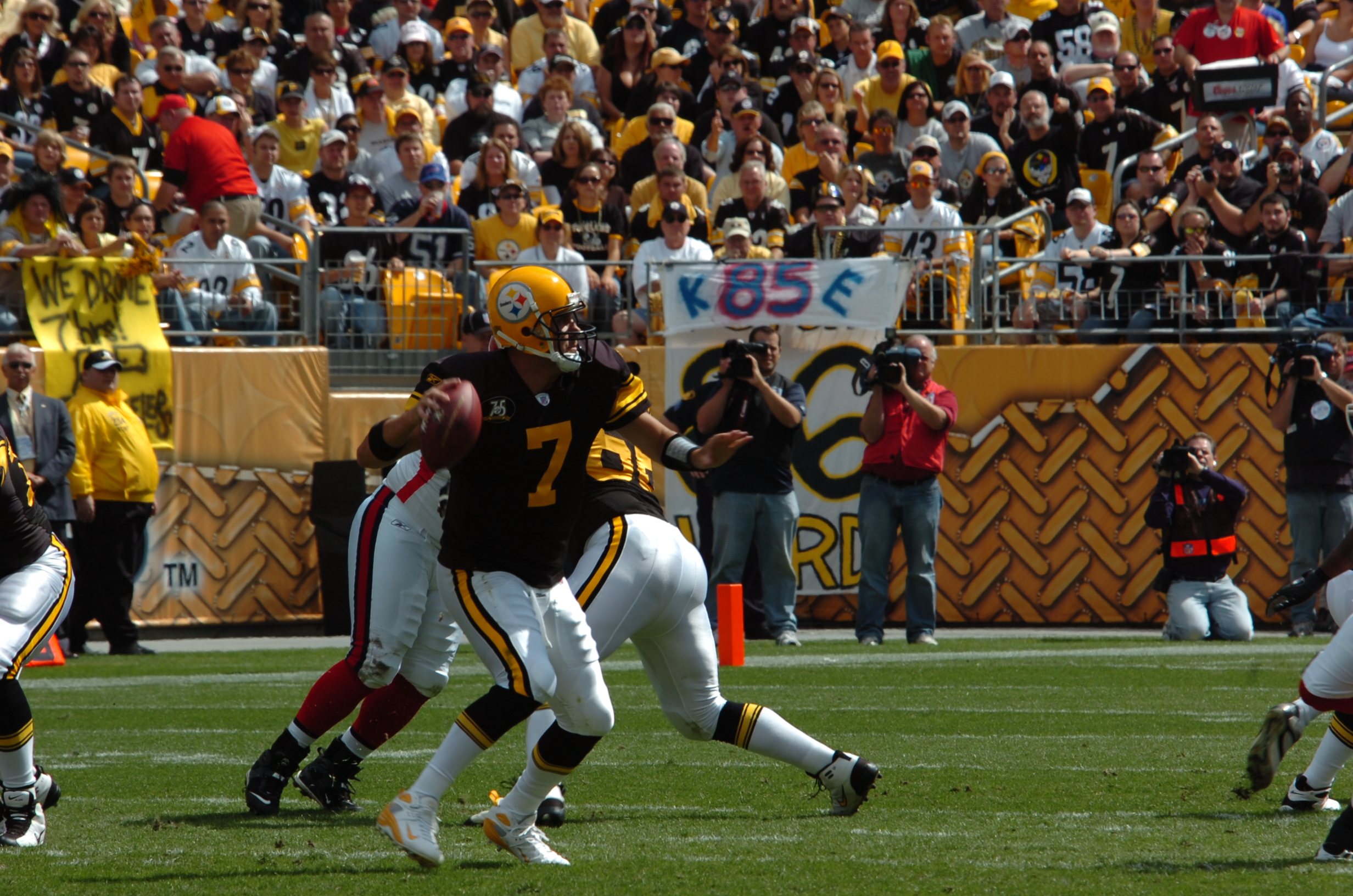
Roethlisberger in a Steelers' throwback jersey during 500th franchise win

In Week 9 against the Baltimore Ravens, Roethlisberger passed for a career-high five touchdown passes, which tied the team record held by Terry Bradshaw and Mark Malone. All five touchdowns were thrown in the first half, making Roethlisberger one of two quarterbacks in the 2007 season (the other being Tom Brady), and only the fifth quarterback since the 1970 merger, to accomplish such a feat. He also posted a perfect 158.3 passer rating. Against the Browns in Week 10, Roethlisberger helped the Steelers erase a 15-point deficit against the rival Browns in a 31–28 victory. He passed for 278 yards, two touchdowns, and one interception to earn AFC Offensive Player of the Week.

In Week 12 against the Miami Dolphins, Roethlisberger set a Steelers record, completing 85.7% of his passes (18 of 21) as the Steelers beat the Miami Dolphins, 3–0—a feat made all the more remarkable given the weather conditions. Pittsburgh was hit with a torrential storm, delaying the Monday night game 30 minutes due to lightning, while turning the new sod on the field, laid earlier that week, into a soggy mess. In many parts of the field, players sunk several inches with each step. After one of the game's punts, the ball infamously stood straight up, stuck in the ground upon impact. With the game scoreless in the fourth quarter, Roethlisberger led a game-winning field goal drive for the only points of the night.

Roethlisberger threw his 29th touchdown pass of the season in Week 15 against the Jacksonville Jaguars, breaking the team single-season touchdown pass record previously held by Bradshaw. In Week 16 against the St. Louis Rams, Roethlisberger became the first quarterback in NFL history to have two perfect passer rating (158.3) games in the same regular season, completing 16 of 20 passes for 261 yards and three touchdowns. It was his third career-perfect passer rating game, tying Peyton Manning for the most such regular-season games in NFL history. He earned his second AFC Offensive Player of the Week nod for the 2007 season.

To cap his comeback season, Roethlisberger was selected to his first Pro Bowl, joining five other Steelers teammates on the AFC squad. Roethlisberger's 32 touchdown passes ranked third in the NFL, behind Tony Romo and Tom Brady, while his 104.1 passer rating was second only to Brady. Roethlisberger also set a new Steelers single-season record with 32 touchdown passes.

In a rematch of the Week 15 game, the Steelers were defeated by the Jaguars in the AFC Wild Card Round, 31–29. In the loss, Roethlisberger passed for 337 yards, two touchdowns, and three interceptions. Roethlisberger finished third in Comeback Player of the Year voting, behind the Patriots' Randy Moss and the Dallas Cowboys' Greg Ellis, who won the award. Roethlisberger played in his first Pro Bowl in Hawaii.

=== 2008: Second Super Bowl championship ===
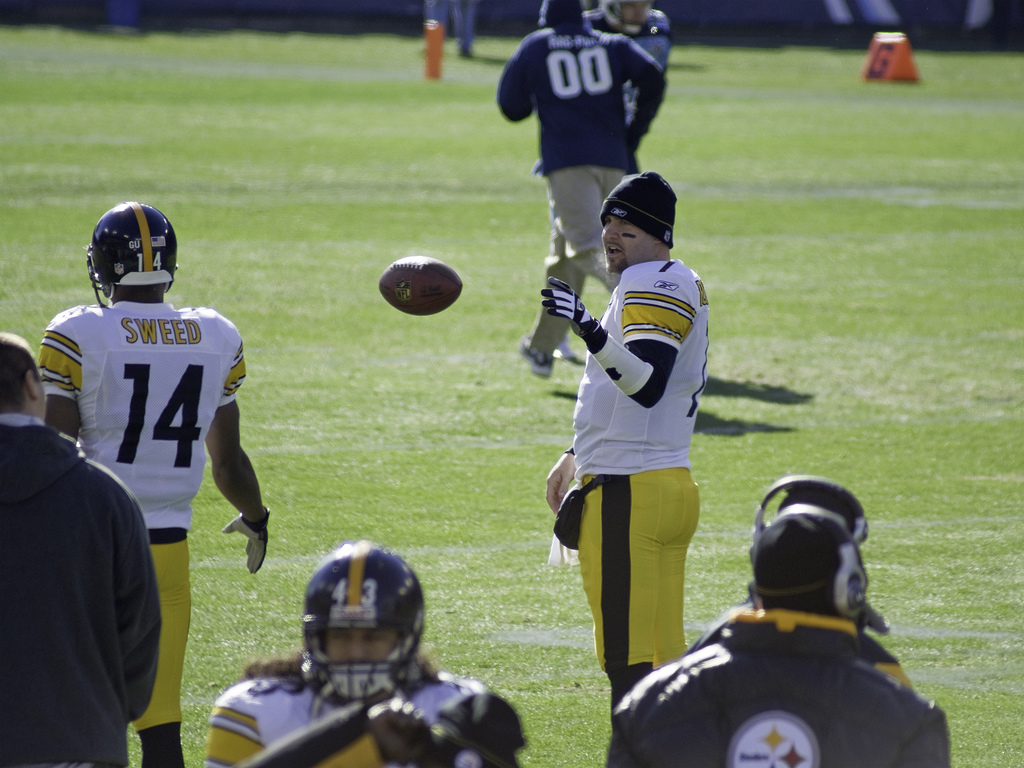
Roethlisberger in 2008 prior to a game against the Tennessee Titans

On March 4, 2008, the Pittsburgh Steelers and Roethlisberger agreed to an eight-year, $102 million contract. Roethlisberger had two years left on his original that he signed after the draft. He stated at the time that he wanted to retire as a Steeler.

In Week 1 against the Houston Texans, Roethlisberger completed 13 of 14 passes for a career-high 92.9 completion percentage (minimum 10 attempts), and finished with 137 yards passing and two touchdown passes in the 38–17 win. Byron Leftwich took over in the fourth quarter when Roethlisberger was on the sideline with a shoulder injury. The next week against the Cleveland Browns, he had the first pass reception of his career: a negative-seven-yard completion to himself after a deflected pass in the second quarter. In a 15–6 loss to the Philadelphia Eagles in Week 3, Roethlisberger was sacked eight times, fumbled twice, threw one interception, and was called for a safety in the fourth quarter. He did not finish the game, as his throwing hand was injured.

In Week 4 against the Baltimore Ravens, the Steelers trailed 13–3 at halftime. Roethlisberger threw a touchdown pass to Santonio Holmes in the third quarter to start a comeback. He completed two passes to Mewelde Moore for 31 yards in overtime, setting up Jeff Reed for the winning 46-yard field goal. The next week, Roethlisberger threw for 239 yards in the first half—a career-high for one half—and directed the game-winning drive, passing for an eight-yard touchdown to Hines Ward to defeat the Jacksonville Jaguars by a score of 26–21. He was named AFC Offensive Player of the Week and the FedEx Air Player of the Week for his performance.

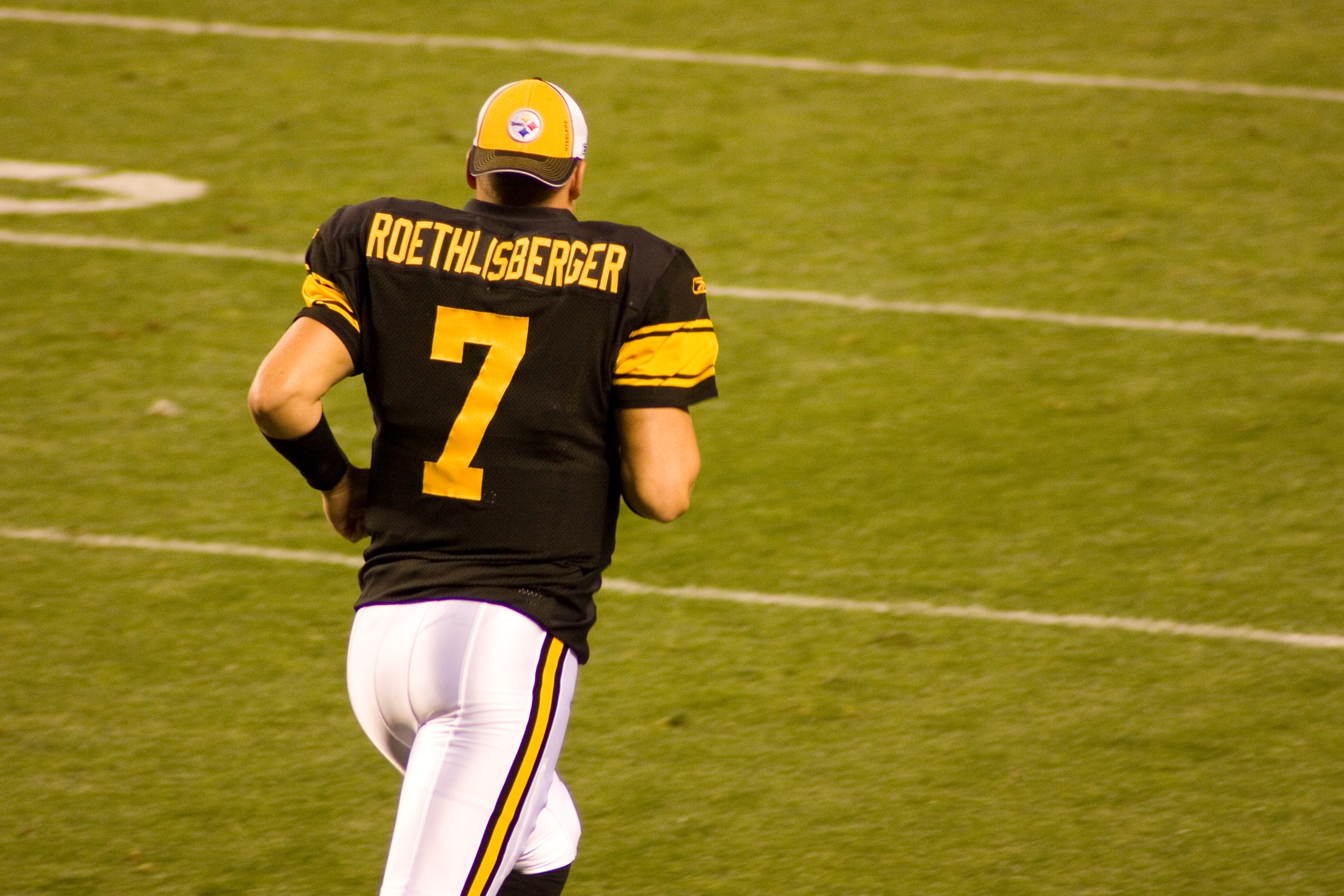
Roethlisberger during a 2008 game

Roethlisberger had one of the worst performances of his career in a Week 9 23–6 win over the Washington Redskins, posting career lows in passer rating (15.1), completions (5), passing yards (50), yards per attempt (2.94) and completion percentage (29.4%). In Week 13 at New England, in consistent rain, Roethlisberger completed 17 of 33 passes for 179 yards, two touchdowns, and one interception. After falling behind, 10–3, in the second quarter, Roethlisberger led the Steelers to 30 unanswered points in a 33–10 victory.

Against the Dallas Cowboys in Week 14, Roethlisberger had his 49th victory as a starting quarterback, breaking the record for the most wins by a quarterback in their first five NFL seasons. The Steelers clinched the AFC North in Week 15 with a win over the Baltimore Ravens, and with a loss to the Tennessee Titans the following week clinched the No. 2 seed in the playoffs. The Steelers defeated the San Diego Chargers in the Divisional Round and the Baltimore Ravens in the AFC Championship en route to the Super Bowl.

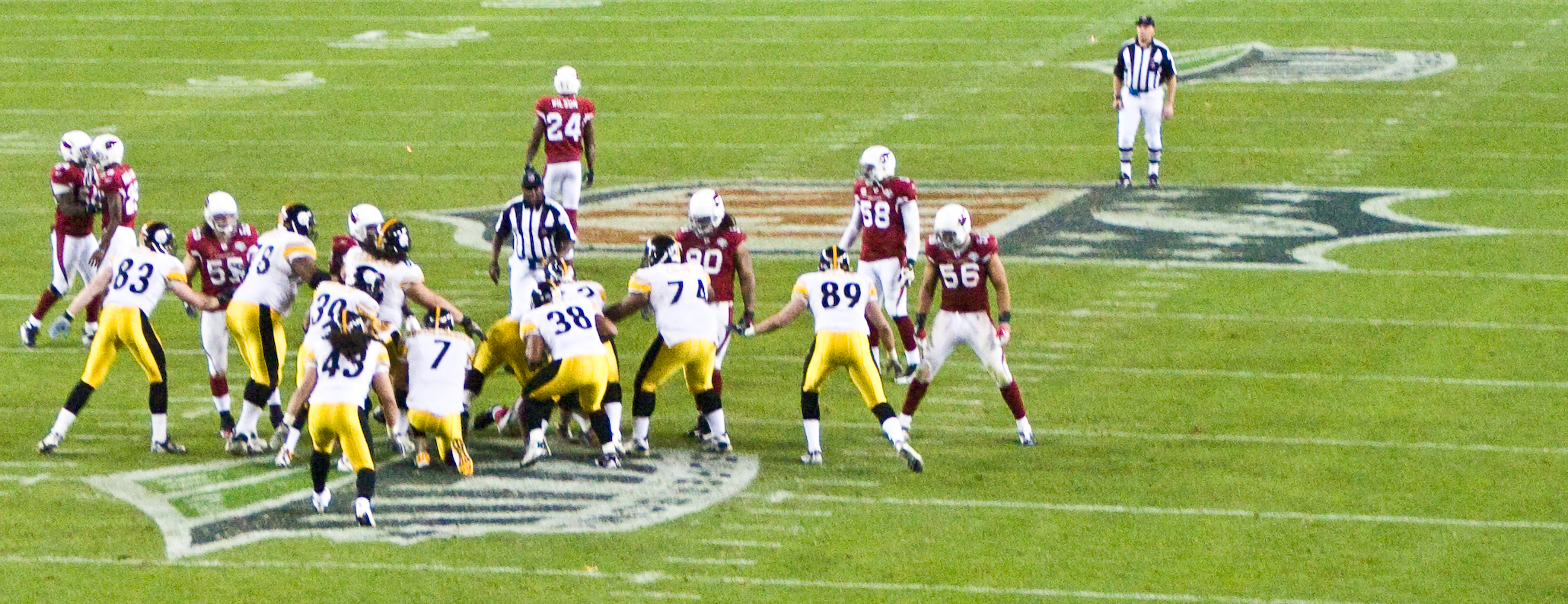
Roethlisberger (7) kneeling out the win for the Steelers in Super Bowl XLIII

In Super Bowl XLIII against the Arizona Cardinals, Roethlisberger led the Steelers to one of the most dramatic victories in Super Bowl history. On the first two offensive drives, Roethlisberger passed for 122 yards on seven of eight passing attempts, which was one yard shy of his total amount from his first Super Bowl start. The Steelers led, 10–0, and went into halftime up, 17–7. The lead grew to 20–7 before Arizona mounted a comeback. Trailing for the first time in the game, 23–20, with 2:30 remaining in the game, Roethlisberger took the field to start the winning drive. After a holding penalty on the first play, Roethlisberger marched the Steelers 88 yards in eight plays, connecting with the game's MVP, Santonio Holmes, four times for 73 yards on the drive, including the six-yard touchdown pass that put the Steelers ahead with 0:35 remaining. After a LaMarr Woodley strip sack and a fumble recovery by Brett Keisel, Roethlisberger and the Steelers offense went back on the field to kneel the ball and run the clock out, ensuring Pittsburgh's victory. Overall, Roethlisberger finished 21 of 30 for 256 yards, one touchdown, and one interception. He had a passer rating of 93.2.

=== 2009 ===
In Week 3 against the Cincinnati Bengals, the Steelers were dominant in the first half and led, 20–9, in the fourth quarter, but the defense surrendered the lead with 14 seconds left. Roethlisberger got the ball back with two seconds remaining and his Hail Mary attempt was incomplete. It was his first NFL loss in the state of Ohio, snapping an 11–0 record. He improved his record of 10–0 against the Cleveland Browns by throwing for 417 yards and 2 touchdowns in Week 6. In Week 11 against the Kansas City Chiefs, he had thrown for 398 yards and three touchdowns before leaving the game in overtime after taking a knee to the helmet on a scramble attempt. He suffered the fourth concussion of his NFL career. After sitting out the overtime loss in Week 12 at Baltimore, Roethlisberger started against the Oakland Raiders in Week 13 and passed for 278 yards and two touchdown passes. He threw a go-ahead touchdown pass to Hines Ward with 1:56 remaining, only to have the Raiders answer back with a winning touchdown with nine seconds left. The Steelers could not hold three leads in the fourth quarter. They led 10–6, 17–13 and 24–20. It was the fifth loss of the season in which they surrendered the lead in the final quarter.

On a frigid Thursday night in Cleveland in Week 14, Roethlisberger was sacked 8 times and did not lead a touchdown drive in his first career loss to Cleveland, ending a perfect 10–0 record against the rival Browns. It is the first time he lost four straight starts.

In Week 15 against the Green Bay Packers, Roethlisberger broke several franchise passing records in ending the five-game losing streak for the Steelers with the biggest passing day in franchise history. His first pass of the day was a 60-yard touchdown to Mike Wallace, and his last pass was a game-winning 19-yard touchdown to Wallace on the final play of the game. He passed for 503 yards, three touchdowns, and had no turnovers. He broke Terry Bradshaw's single-season record of 3,724 passing yards, and set a new mark for single-season completions (302). After leading a FG drive to take a 30–28 lead, the defense again surrendered the lead and the Steelers trailed, 36–30. Roethlisberger used all 2:01 he had left to drive the team 86 yards for the winning touchdown with no time remaining. Roethlisberger was named AFC Player of the Week for his effort; the fifth time he has won that award in his career.

In Week 16 against the Baltimore Ravens, Roethlisberger's 259-yard effort helped him become the first quarterback in franchise history to pass for over 4,000 yards in a single season. With the game tied at 20 in the final quarter, he led the Steelers on the game-winning field goal drive as they improved to 8–7.

Roethlisberger finished the season with 4,328 yards and 26 touchdown passes. He was 9–6 as a starter and his 100.5 passer rating was the second time in his career he had a season with a rating over 100. He was sacked 50 times in 2009. Despite the three game win streak to end the season, the Steelers did not make the playoffs after tie-breakers eliminated them. Roethlisberger was voted as team MVP by the Steelers for the first time in his career. He was selected as the first alternate to the Pro Bowl, but declined the invitation to rest his right shoulder which was injured in the Miami game.

=== 2010: Third Super Bowl appearance ===
In Week 6 against the Cleveland Browns, after being suspended for the first four games of the season under the NFL player conduct policy, Roethlisberger returned to the Steelers. In his first game of the season he completed 16 of 27 passes for 258 yards, three touchdowns, and one interception.

In Week 7 against the Miami Dolphins, with the Steelers trailing, 22–20, with 2:37 remaining in the game, Roethlisberger was at the center of controversy when he ran a QB draw and dove for the end zone, appearing to score a touchdown in the process. The play was ruled a touchdown on the field, but reviews showed Roethlisberger had fumbled short of the end zone. However, the review failed to provide conclusive evidence as to who recovered the ball after the fumble. By rule, possession was given to Pittsburgh, resulting in the game-winning field goal. Roethlisberger passed for 302 yards and 2 touchdowns in the game. "Just a bizarre kind of play. You hate to win it that way, but you'll take a win," Roethlisberger said.

In Week 8 against the New Orleans Saints, Roethlisberger, playing in his 90th regular season game, reached the 20,000-yard passing mark, but failed to throw a touchdown pass as the Steelers lost on Halloween night in the Superdome. Roethlisberger improved to 8–2 as a starter on Monday Night Football in Week 9 against the Cincinnati Bengals, and 63–27 over his first 90 regular season starts (tied with Jim McMahon for third-highest win percentage through a player's first 90 starts). Roethlisberger passed for a season-high 387 yards and 3 touchdowns in the Week 10, 39–26 loss, to the New England Patriots, but also had an interception returned for a score and was sacked five times as he tried to rally the Steelers from a 23–3 deficit in the second half.

In his first win over the Oakland Raiders in Week 11, Roethlisberger passed for 275 yards and three touchdowns, and rushed for a career-high 55 yards and a touchdown. Celebrating a second-quarter touchdown pass, Roethlisberger was punched in the face by Raiders' defensive lineman Richard Seymour, who was then ejected. Roethlisberger was questionable to start the Week 13 game against the Baltimore Ravens with a foot injury, but did start the game and suffered a broken nose on the first series after a hit to the face from Haloti Ngata. Trailing 10–6 in the fourth quarter, Roethlisberger threw a go-ahead touchdown pass to Isaac Redman with 2:51 remaining and the Steelers held on for the 13–10 win as he finished with 253 yards passing.

In Week 17 against the Cleveland Browns, the Steelers clinched the AFC North and the #2 seed in the AFC playoffs. In the 41–9 victory, he finished with 280 passing yards and two touchdowns to earn AFC Offensive Player of the Week. He finished the season with a 9–3 record in 12 starts, passing for 3,200 yards, 17 touchdowns and a career-low five interceptions.

Late in the first quarter of the AFC Divisional Round against the Baltimore Ravens, Roethlisberger was sacked and fumbled the ball, and after both teams thought the pass was incomplete, it was eventually picked up by Cory Redding for a Baltimore touchdown. The Steelers trailed, 21–7, in the third quarter before Roethlisberger completed touchdown passes to Heath Miller and Hines Ward to tie the game at 21. With just over two minutes left, the game was tied, 24–24, and the Steelers faced a 3rd and 19. Roethlisberger completed a deep pass to rookie wide receiver Antonio Brown for 58 yards and Rashard Mendenhall's rushing touchdown put the Steelers ahead for good, 31–24, with 1:33 left. It was Roethlisberger's third game-winning drive in a playoff game. He finished with 19 completions on 32 attempts for 226 yards and 2 touchdown passes.

In the AFC Championship against the New York Jets, Roethlisberger rushed for a touchdown in the first half as the Steelers built a 24–0 lead, before the Jets scored 19 unanswered points. With two minutes remaining in the game, Roethlsiberger faced a 3rd and 6. He scrambled right and completed a 14-yard pass to Antonio Brown to seal the victory for Pittsburgh, sending them to their third Super Bowl appearance in the last six seasons. Roethlisberger completed 10 of 19 passes for a season-low 133 yards and two interceptions in the 28–21 victory.

In Super Bowl XLV against the Green Bay Packers, Roethlisberger was hit as he attempted a pass to Mike Wallace in the first quarter, and it was intercepted for a touchdown by Nick Collins. The Steelers trailed, 21–3, in the second quarter before Roethlisberger completed a touchdown pass to Hines Ward to make it 21–10 at halftime. The Steelers closed to within 21–17 in the third quarter, but were unable to score on their next three drives. After falling behind, 28–17, in the fourth quarter, Roethlisberger threw a 25-yard touchdown pass to Mike Wallace, and then pitched the ball to Antwaan Randle El on an option run for the two-point conversion to make it 28–25. Taking over at his own 13 with 1:59 left and down 31–25, Roethlisberger was unable to lead the game-winning drive against Green Bay this time after his pass fell incomplete to Wallace on 4th and 5 at his own 33-yard line, ensuring the only Super Bowl loss of his career. Roethlisberger finished the 31–25 loss 25 of 40 for 263 yards, 2 touchdowns and 2 interceptions. "I feel like I let the city of Pittsburgh down, the fans, my coaches and my teammates," Roethlisberger said, "and it's not a good feeling." In the off-season, he was ranked 41st by his fellow players on the NFL Top 100 Players of 2011.

=== 2011 ===
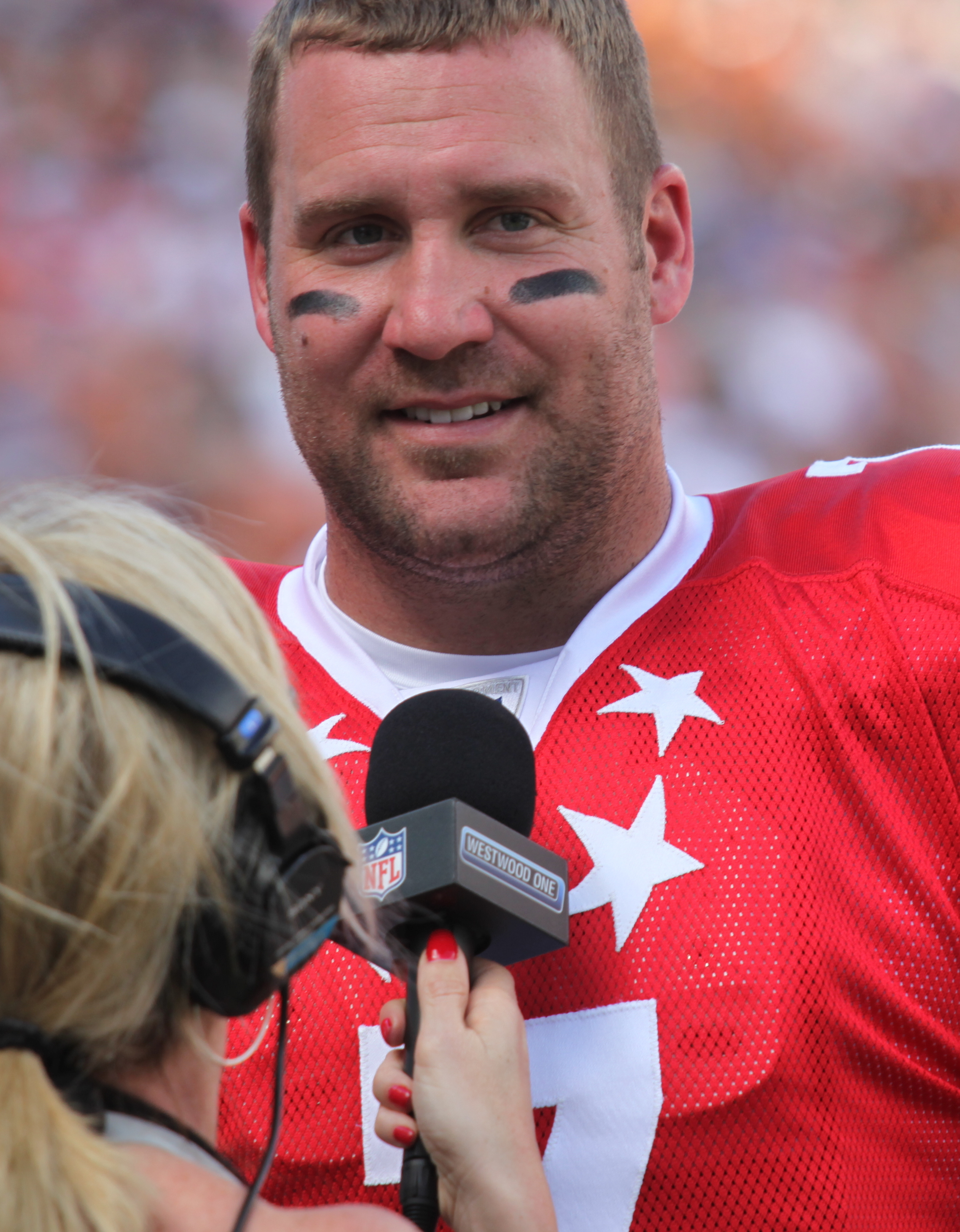
Roethlisberger at his second Pro Bowl in 2011

In Week 1 against the Baltimore Ravens, Roethlisberger set career-worsts for turnovers (5) and largest margin of defeat (28) in his first loss against the Ravens since 2006. In Week 2 against the Seattle Seahawks, he became the fourth quarterback to reach 70 wins in his first 100 starts, as he threw for 298 yards and did not turn the ball over. He took a shot to his right knee in the second quarter, but returned after missing two plays to finish the game.

In a 23–20 Week 3 win against the Indianapolis Colts, Roethlisberger threw for a career-high 171 yards in the first quarter, turned the ball over three times in the second quarter, then led the Steelers to the 20th fourth quarter comeback of his career, passing Terry Bradshaw for the most in Steelers' history. In Week 5 against the Tennessee Titans, Roethlisberger threw five touchdown passes for the second time in his career. He earned AFC Offensive Player of the Week honors for the seventh time in his career. In Week 7 against the Arizona Cardinals, Roethlisberger set the franchise record for longest pass with a 95-yard touchdown pass to Mike Wallace. He finished with 361 yards and 3 touchdowns in his first regular season win over the Cardinals. Roethlisberger beat the Tom Brady-led Patriots for the first time in seven years in Week 8, completing 36 of 50 passes for 365 yards and 2 touchdowns. He was named AFC Offensive Player of the Week for the eighth time in his career. In Week 12 against the Kansas City Chiefs, Roethlisberger's career-best streak of 18 consecutive games with 200+ yards passing came to an end as he finished with 193. In Week 13 against the Cincinnati Bengals, Roethlisberger moved past Terry Bradshaw in the Steelers' record books; first for most times sacked, then for most pass completions in team history.

In the second quarter of the Week 14 game against the Cleveland Browns, Roethlisberger's leg was injured on a sack and he left the game. He returned for the second half and played the rest of the game, despite limping on his high-ankle sprain. He threw a game-clinching 79-yard touchdown pass to Antonio Brown late in the fourth quarter as the Steelers won 14–3. Roethlisberger finished with 280 yards passing on just 21 attempts for a career-high 13.33 YPA (min. 15 attempts). On the injury, Roethlisberger said, "It was one of the most painful things I ever felt. It felt like the middle of my leg was just, cracked ... it felt like my foot was outside of my leg." In Week 15 against the San Francisco 49ers, Roethlisberger started the game while suffering through a high-ankle sprain. During the game, it was clear that Roethlisberger was still showing signs of the injury due to him limping between plays. He finished the game without any touchdowns, but had 330 yards passing while throwing three interceptions.

Due to Roethlisberger's leg injury from Week 14, the team opted to sit him and start Charlie Batch in the Week 16 game against the St. Louis Rams, giving Roethlisberger more time to recover.

In Week 17 against the Cleveland Browns, just three weeks after the Browns injured Roethlisberger in Pittsburgh, Roethlisberger once again took the field to face the same opponents in their home stadium. The Steelers opted to start Roethlisberger over Batch because of the possibility that Baltimore could drop its final game, and a win by the Steelers would take back the division title. Despite his injury, Mike Tomlin and the coaching staff believed Roethlisberger gave them their best chance at victory. Big Ben completed 23 of 40 passes for 221 yards with no touchdowns or interceptions. Baltimore went on to win their final game and secured the division title, leaving Steelers with the number 5 seed to face Denver in the Wild Card round of the playoffs.

In the Wild Card Round against the Denver Broncos, Roethlisberger and the Steelers offense battled a tough Denver defense, trailing 20–6 at the half, but tying it at 23–23 before the end of regulation. The game-tying touchdown came on a 2nd and 10 with 3:47 remaining in regulation, where Big Ben made a vintage play eluding pass rushers before connecting with Jerricho Cotchery on a 31-yard pass. Despite the heroic efforts of Roethlisberger and company, Tim Tebow's magical season continued with his best single-game performance to date, capped off with an 80-yard completion to Demaryius Thomas to end overtime after one play. Roethlisberger completed 22 of 40 passes for 289 yards, with 1 touchdown and 1 interception in the 29–23 overtime loss to end the 2011 season. He was named to the Pro Bowl for the 2011 season. He finished ranked 30th by his peers on the NFL Top 100 Players of 2012.

=== 2012 ===
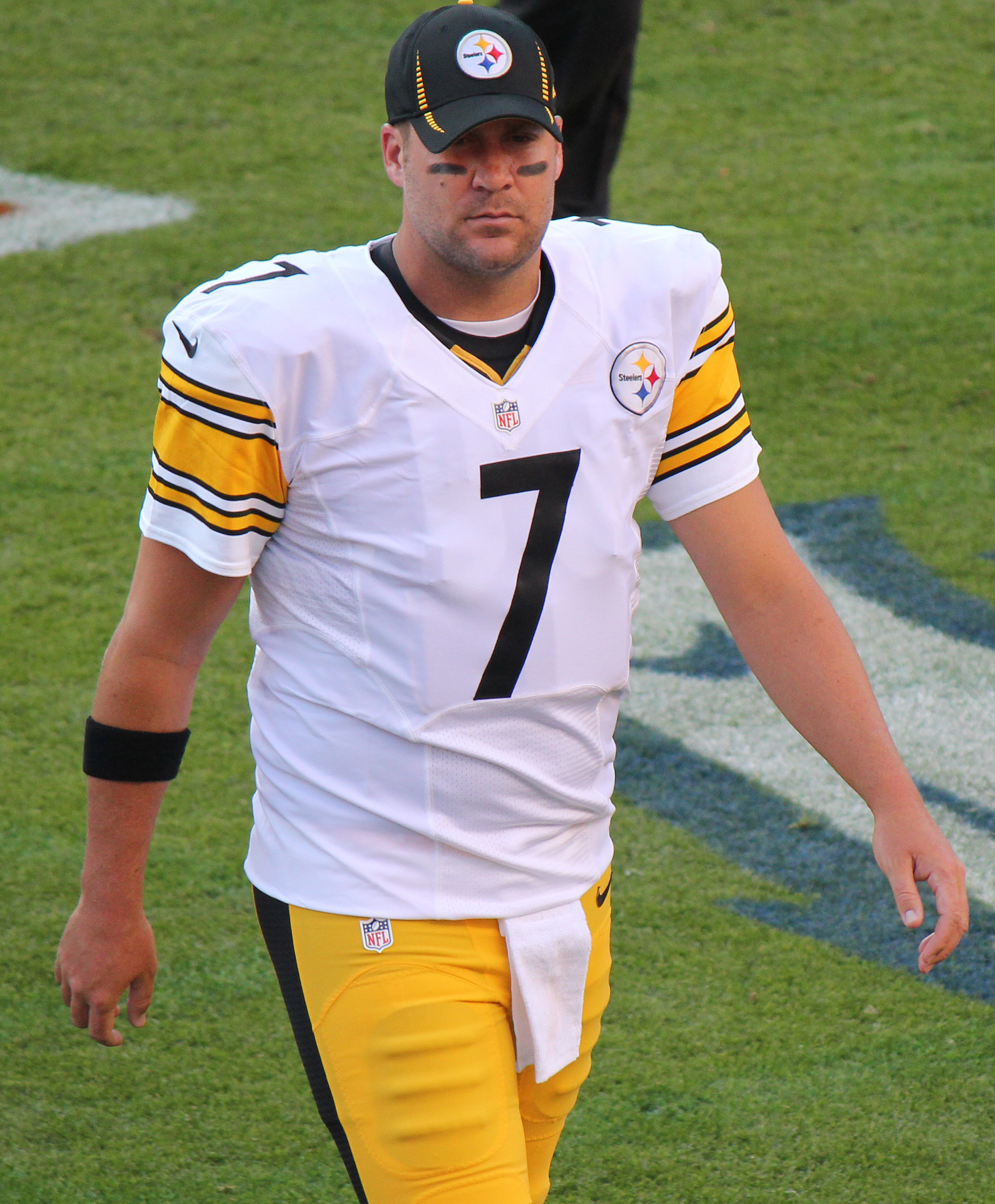
Roethlisberger in Denver for the season opener in September 2012

Roethlisberger threw for 3,265 yards, 26 touchdowns, and 8 interceptions in thirteen games as the Steelers finished the 2012 season with an 8–8 record. One of his best individual games in the 2012 season came against the Oakland Raiders in Week 3. He had 384 passing yards and four touchdowns in the 34–31 loss. He missed three games due to injury, being replaced by Byron Leftwich, who went 0–1, and Charlie Batch, who went 1–1. It was the Steelers first season missing the playoffs since 2009 and their first with a non-winning record since 2006. He finished ranked 61st by his fellow players on the NFL Top 100 Players of 2013.

In 2012, Roethlisberger returned to Miami University to complete his college degree, graduating with a Bachelor of Science in Education on May 6, 2012. Roethlisberger walked with the other graduates at the commencement ceremony, with his parents, grandmother, and wife Ashley in attendance. He had planned on finishing his degree sooner, but the Steelers having deep playoff runs earlier in his career prevented him from registering for classes in time for the winter term, only being able to do it after the Steelers were eliminated in the Wild Card round against the Denver Broncos the previous season. Roethlisberger became the second member of the Steelers in less than a year to return to college and complete his degree, with teammate Polamalu doing the same thing the previous off-season during the 2011 NFL lockout.

=== 2013 ===
Roethlisberger threw for 4,261 yards and 28 touchdowns in 16 games in 2013 as the Steelers finished the season with an 8–8 record. In Week 11, in a 37–27 victory over the Detroit Lions, he had 367 passing yards and four touchdowns to earn AFC Offensive Player of the Week. The Steelers would go on to miss the playoffs after the San Diego Chargers defeated the Kansas City Chiefs 27–24 in overtime in Week 17. This would also be the first time they missed the playoffs in back-to-back seasons since 1999 and the first time under Mike Tomlin. Roethlisberger was ranked 31st by his fellow players on the NFL Top 100 Players of 2014.

This season was particularly notable for Roethlisberger as it marked the beginning of the Killer B's era. Roethlisberger, along with wide receiver Antonio Brown, running back Le'Veon Bell and, later, kicker Chris Boswell all entered their primes. Roethlisberger finished the season seventh in passing yards, eighth in touchdowns, 10th in completion percentage and his 92.0 passer rating ranked 12th in the league for the 2013 season. Roethlisberger targeted Brown in particular 165 times, resulting in 110 receptions for 1,499 yards and 8 touchdowns. This accounted for approximately 28% of Roethlisberger's 584 pass attempts that season. Even though he was not a receiver and mainly fulfilled the role of being a "power back" in the Steelers' offense, Roethlisberger targeted Bell 66 times, resulting in 45 receptions for 399 yards, but recording no receiving touchdowns.

=== 2014 ===
Roesthilsberger started the 2014 season with a 4–3 record in the first seven games. On October 26, 2014, against the Indianapolis Colts, Roethlisberger completed 40 of 49 passes for a career-high 522 yards and six touchdowns as the Steelers defeated the Indianapolis Colts 51–34. With the win, Roethlisberger became just the fourth quarterback in NFL history to get 100 wins in his first 150 starts. He also became the first NFL quarterback to pass for over 500 yards twice in a career. He earned AFC Offensive Player of the Week for his effort against the Colts. In the next game, a 43–23 victory over the Baltimore Ravens, he had 340 passing yards and six passing touchdowns to earn AFC Offensive Player of the Week for the second consecutive week.

In the Steelers Week 15 matchup against the Atlanta Falcons, Roethlisberger completed 27 of 35 passes for 360 yards in a 27–20 victory. The victory made Roethlisberger only the sixth quarterback in NFL history to have defeated at least 31 different teams, joining Tom Brady, Drew Brees, Kerry Collins, Brett Favre, and Peyton Manning; Roethlisberger has only played with one team and thus has not played against the Steelers. The Steelers lost 41–38 in Roethlisberger's only other matchup against Atlanta in 2006, and he was suspended for the Steelers 15–9 overtime victory against the Falcons in 2010.

During 2014, Roethlisberger passed for career highs in yards with 4,952, completion percentage with 67.1, completions with 408, and attempts with 608. Roethlisberger also matched his career high in passing touchdowns with 32, as well as posting a passer rating of 103.3, the second highest of his career. His 4,952 yards were tied for most on the season with Drew Brees, but Roethlisberger reached the mark with fewer completions.

The Steelers had an 11–5 record and finished first in the AFC North. They lost in the Wild Card Round of the playoffs against the Baltimore Ravens by a score of 30–17. He was named to his third career Pro Bowl for the 2014 season. He was ranked 26th by his fellow players on the NFL Top 100 Players of 2015.

=== 2015 ===
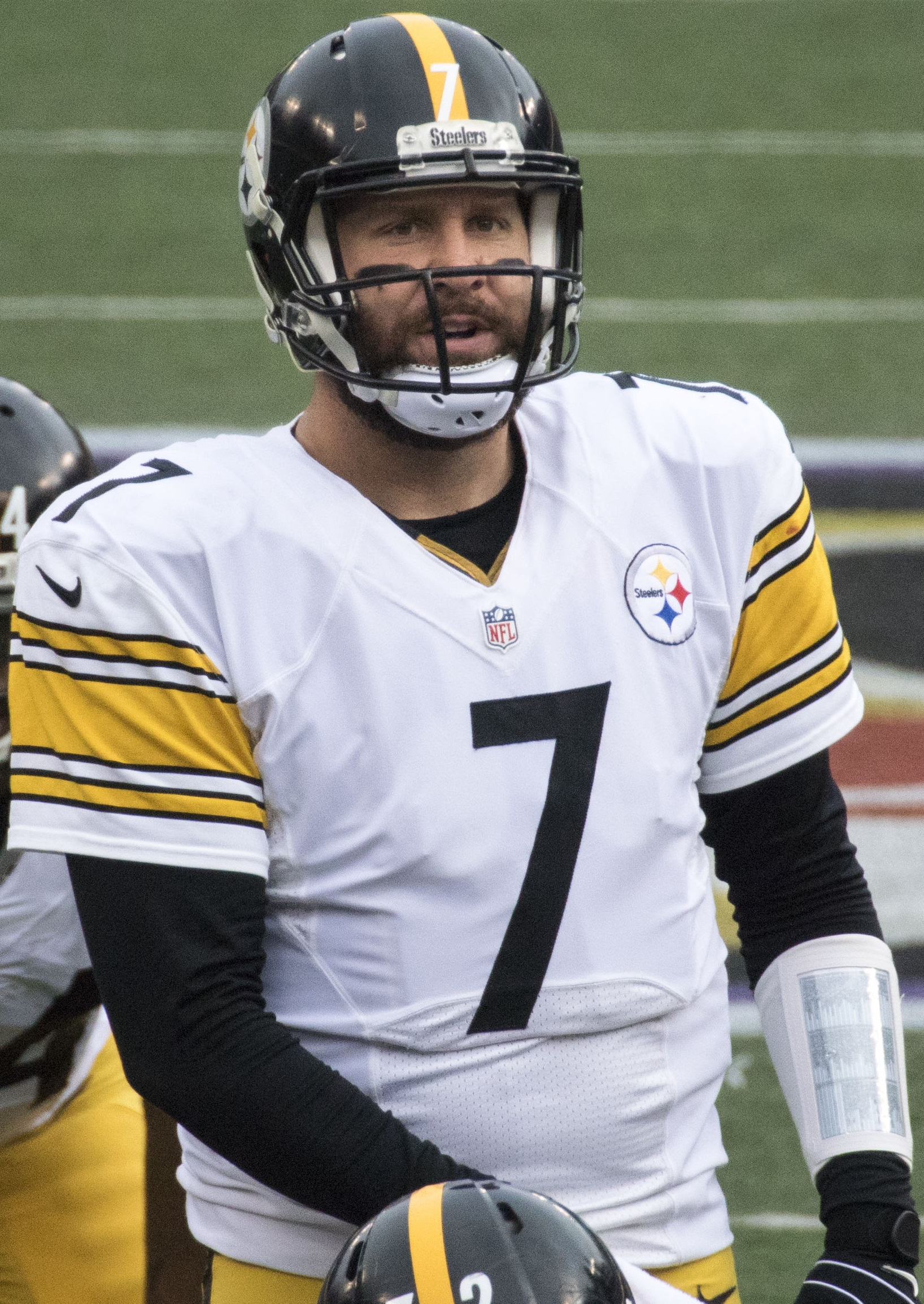
Roethlisberger in Baltimore in 2015

On March 13, Roethlisberger signed a five-year contract extension with the Steelers. Roethlisberger went 26 for 38 for 351 yards, one touchdown pass and one interception during a 28–21 loss against the New England Patriots to kick off the 2015 NFL season. However, Roethlisberger and the Steelers won their next two games against the San Francisco 49ers and the St. Louis Rams. In the 43–18 victory over the 49ers, he had 369 passing yards and three touchdowns to earn AFC Offensive Player of the Week.

During the September 27 game against the St. Louis Rams, Roethlisberger suffered a sprained MCL and a bone bruise. Roethlisberger missed the Steelers' next four games, during which Michael Vick and Landry Jones combined to go 2–2.

Roethlisberger sustained another injury against the Oakland Raiders on November 8, 2015, suffering a left mid-foot sprain. Due to this injury, he did not start the following week against the Cleveland Browns, although he was listed as active for the game. However, early in the first quarter, Landry Jones sprained his left ankle, resulting in Roethlisberger entering the game in relief for only the second time in his career. Roethlisberger threw for 379 yards and three touchdowns on the way to a Steelers win and an AFC Offensive Player of the Week award; his 379 passing yards were the most by a quarterback in relief since Don Strock threw for 403 yards for the Miami Dolphins against the San Diego Chargers in the Epic in Miami playoff game in 1982. On November 29, Roethlisberger threw for 456 yards against the Seattle Seahawks, but he also threw two interceptions, and the Seahawks took a 39–30 win.

The Steelers clinched a playoff spot with a 10–6 record, finishing second in the AFC North behind the Cincinnati Bengals. They defeated the Bengals by a score of 18–16 in the Wild Card Round, but lost to the eventual Super Bowl champion Denver Broncos in the Divisional Round by a score of 23–16.

Despite the season-ending loss to Denver, of the Broncos' three postseason opponents en route to their Super Bowl title, Roethlisberger was the only quarterback to not throw an interception against Denver's top-ranked "No Fly Zone" defense, while Tom Brady threw two interceptions in the AFC Championship Game and Cam Newton threw one pick in Super Bowl 50. The Steelers also committed just one turnover against the Broncos, compared to the New England Patriots committing two in the AFC Title Game and the Carolina Panthers turning it over four times in the Super Bowl. Pittsburgh also gained the most amount of total yards on offense with 396, with New England and Carolina recording 336 and 315 yards respectively, and also the greatest number of passing yards with 311, compared to the Patriots managing 229 yards through the air and the Panthers with 197 passing yards.

Roethlisberger was named to his fourth career Pro Bowl and was ranked 21st by his fellow players on the NFL Top 100 Players of 2016.

=== 2016 ===
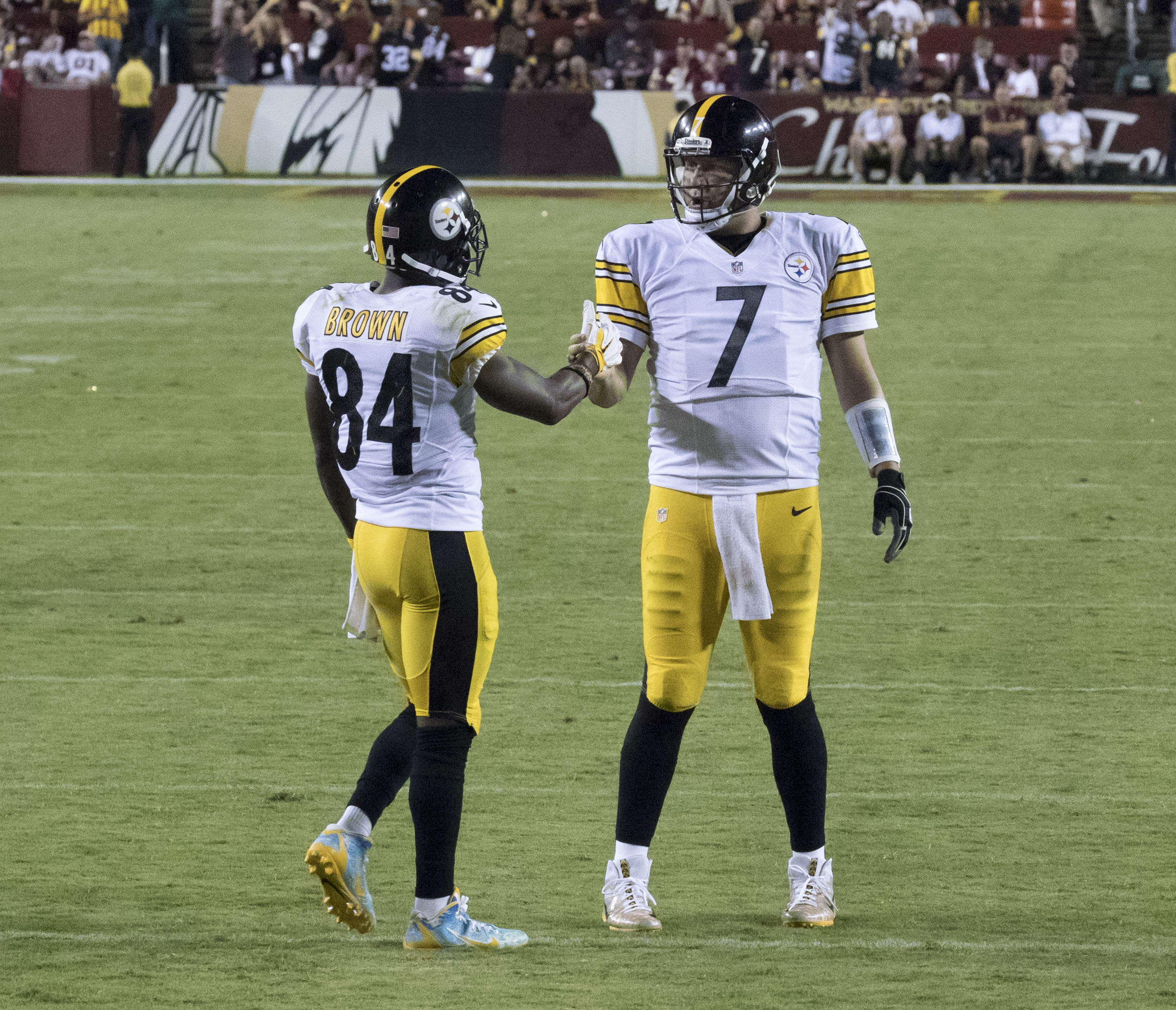
Roethlisberger with Antonio Brown in September 2016

Roethlisberger started off the 2016 season with a 2–1 record in the first three games. He had back-to-back 300-yard passing performances against the Kansas City Chiefs and New York Jets in Weeks 4–5, and combined for nine touchdowns in that span. For his effort against the Chiefs, he earned AFC Offensive Player of the Week. However, the following week on the road against the Miami Dolphins, Roethlisberger left the game after suffering a knee injury. He underwent surgery on October 17 for a torn meniscus and missed the following week against the New England Patriots. The Steelers made the playoffs, winning the AFC North with an 11–5 record. They defeated the Miami Dolphins by a score of 30–12 in the Wild Card Round and beat the Chiefs 18–16 in the Divisional Round. However, the Steelers lost 36–17 to the Patriots in the AFC Championship. He passed for 314 passing yards, one passing touchdown, and one interception.

Roethlisberger was named to his third consecutive and fifth career Pro Bowl on December 20, 2016, and was ranked 22nd on the NFL Top 100 Players of 2017, just one spot below his ranking from the previous year.

=== 2017 ===
Roethlisberger helped lead the Steelers to a 3–1 record to start to the 2017 season. In Week 5 against the Jacksonville Jaguars, Roethlisberger threw a career-high five interceptions as the Steelers lost by a score of 30–9. In Week 11 against the Tennessee Titans, he completed 30 of 45 passes for 299 yards and four touchdowns as the Steelers won 40–17. In that game, Roethlisberger recorded his 4,000th career completion on a three-yard pass to tight end Jesse James. On December 4, Roethlisberger became the eighth quarterback to reach 50,000 career passing yards in a game against the Cincinnati Bengals. In Week 14 against the Baltimore Ravens, he completed 44 of 66 passes (both single-game career highs) for 506 yards and two touchdowns in a 39–38 win, becoming the first player in NFL history with three career 500-yard passing games. With the win, the Steelers clinched a playoff berth and the AFC North title. His 44 completions set an NFL record for the most completions in a non-overtime game and were the second most in NFL history behind Drew Bledsoe's 45 completions in 1994. His performance in Week 14 earned him AFC Offensive Player of the Week.

During Week 15 against the New England Patriots, Roethlisberger finished with 281 passing yards, two touchdowns, and an interception. In the closing seconds of the fourth quarter, two controversial moments occurred; Roethlisberger threw a potential game-winning touchdown to tight end Jesse James, but was overturned after James seemingly lost control when the ball touched the ground. Two plays later, Roethlisberger faked a spike to pass, which was intercepted by Duron Harmon, resulting in the Steelers losing 24–27.

On December 19, 2017, Roethlisberger was named to his fourth consecutive and sixth career Pro Bowl along with his star receiver Antonio Brown and three of his starting offensive lineman among others.

The Steelers finished the 2017 season with a 13–3 record, clinching the AFC North division. In the AFC Divisional Round, the Steelers faced the Jaguars. Although the Jaguars had the #1 passing defense in 2017, Roethlisberger finished with a playoff career-high 469 passing yards, five touchdowns, and an interception, but the Steelers lost 42–45. He was ranked 18th by his fellow players on the NFL Top 100 Players of 2018.

=== 2018 ===
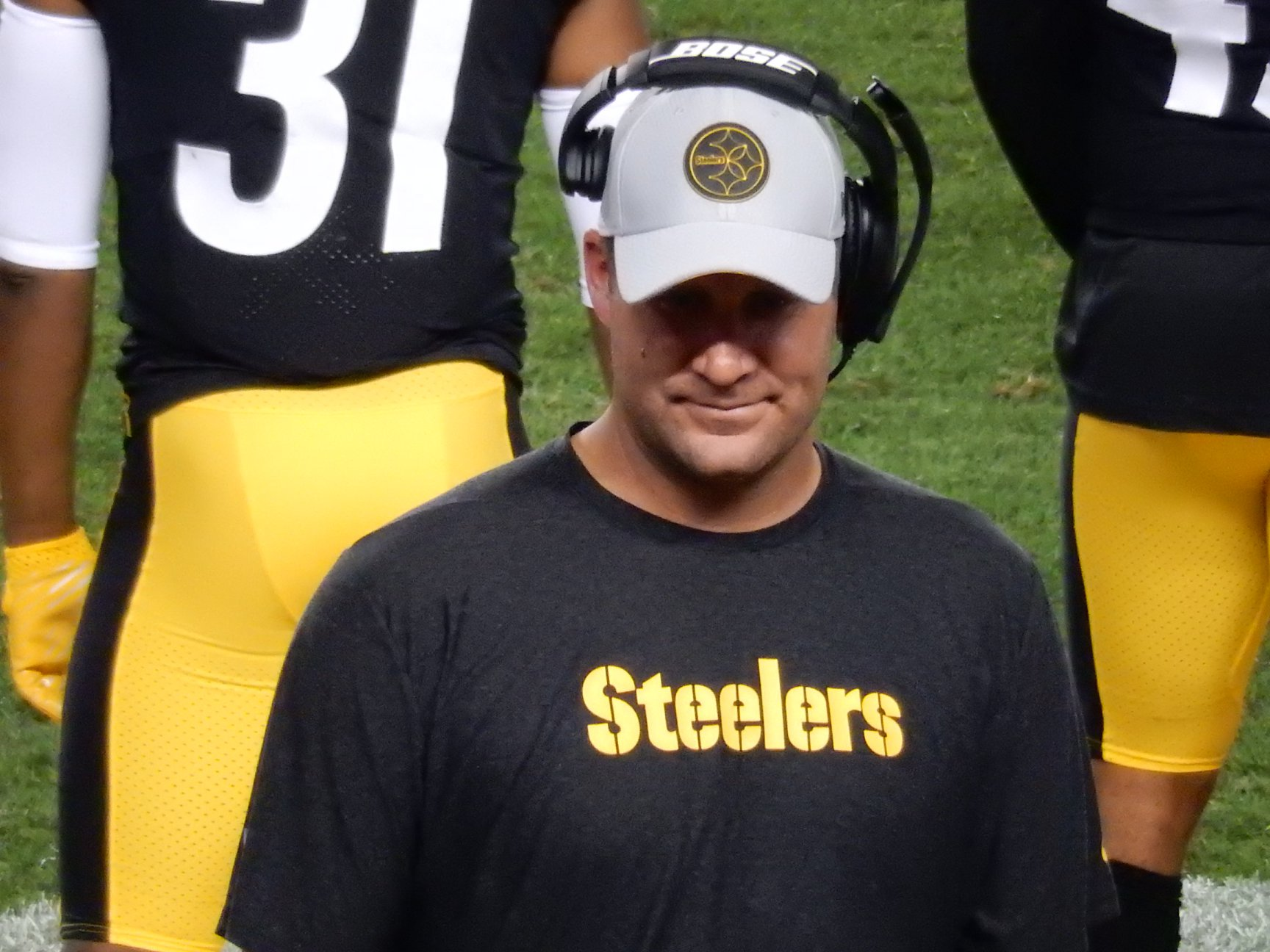
Roethlisberger during a preseason game in 2018

Roethlisberger started the 2018 season with 335 passing yards, one touchdown, and three interceptions in a 21–21 tie against the Cleveland Browns. In Week 2, in a 42–37 loss to the Kansas City Chiefs, Roethlisberger passed for 452 yards, three touchdowns, and had a rushing touchdown. He became the third player since 1950 with at least 450 passing yards, three passing touchdowns, and a rushing touchdown in the same game. He passed John Elway for seventh-most passing yards in NFL history. In Week 3, Roethlisberger completed 79% of his passes for 353 yards and three touchdowns in a 30–27 win over the Tampa Bay Buccaneers, earning him AFC Offensive Player of the Week. In Week 10 against the Carolina Panthers, Roethlisberger had more touchdowns than incompletions on a statline of 22-of-25 for 328 yards and five touchdowns in his NFL-record fourth game with a perfect quarterback rating. His performance in Week 10 earned him AFC Offensive Player of the Week for the second time in 2018. In a Week 12 loss to the Denver Broncos, he passed for a season-high 462 yards, one touchdown, and two interceptions. In Week 16, a 31–28 loss to the New Orleans Saints, he passed for 380 yards and three touchdowns in a loss that hurt their playoff chances. Despite a win in Week 17, the Steelers missed the playoffs for the first time since 2013, finishing second in the AFC North with a 9–6–1 record.

Roethlisberger led the league in passing yards (5,129) for the second time in his career. He led the league in completions (452), attempts (675) and interceptions (16). His 5,129 passing yards and 34 touchdown passes set franchise records, both of which were held by Roethlisberger in his 2014 season.

=== 2019 ===
On April 24, 2019, Roethlisberger signed a two-year contract extension with the Steelers worth $68 million with a $37.5 million signing bonus, keeping him under contract through the 2021 season. In Week 2 against the Seattle Seahawks, Roethlisberger injured his right elbow and was unable to play in the second half of the game. His backup Mason Rudolph relieved him as the Steelers lost 28–26. Subsequently, the team announced the following day that Roethlisberger would be placed on the season ending injured-reserve list after undergoing surgery on his injured elbow. After the season, it was revealed that Roethlisberger's injury was much more serious than originally anticipated, as he tore off three flexor tendons from his throwing arm, and he is believed to be the first quarterback to attempt a comeback from such an injury.

=== 2020 ===
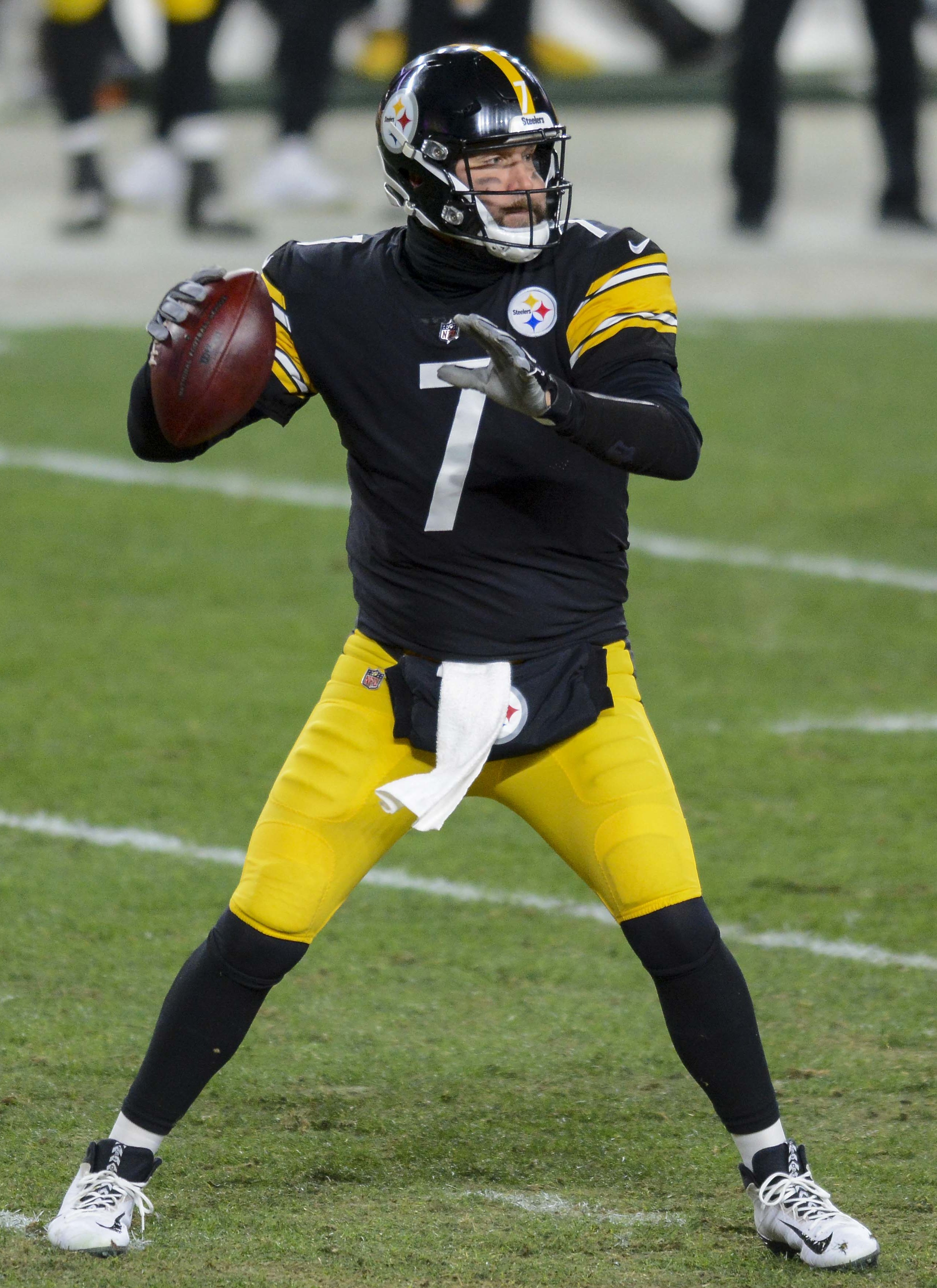
Roethlisberger playing for the Steelers in 2020

Roethlisberger made his return from injury in the Week 1 game against the New York Giants, where he threw for 229 yards and three touchdowns in the 26–16 win. In Week 3 against the Houston Texans, Roethlisberger threw for 237 yards and two touchdowns during the 28–21 win. During the game, Roethlisberger broke Mike Webster's record for the most games played with the Steelers with 221 games. In Week 5 against the Philadelphia Eagles, Roethlisberger threw for 239 yards and three touchdowns, all to Chase Claypool, during the 38–29 win. With the victory, he helped lead the Steelers to their first 4–0 start since 1979. In Week 9 against the Dallas Cowboys, Roethlisberger threw for 306 yards and three touchdowns during the 24–19 win. The victory over the Cowboys marked an 8–0 start to the season for the Steelers, the best in franchise history. On November 10, 2020, Roethlisberger was placed on the reserve/COVID-19 after being deemed high risk due to Vance McDonald contracting COVID-19, but was activated four days later. In Week 10, against the Cincinnati Bengals, he had 333 passing yards and four passing touchdowns in the 36–10 victory. Roethlisberger was named the AFC Offensive Player of the Week for his performance. In Week 13 against the Washington Football Team, Roethlisberger threw for 305 yards, two touchdowns and an interception during the 23–17 loss. This was the Steelers' first loss of the season.

Roethlisberger finished the 2020 season with 3,803 passing yards, 33 touchdowns, and ten interceptions as the Steelers finished 12–4 with an AFC North title. Against the Cleveland Browns in the Wild Card Round, Roethlisberger completed 47 out of 68 pass attempts for 501 yards and four touchdowns, but threw four interceptions in a 48–37 loss. Roethlisberger's 47 pass competitions set an NFL record for most completions in a game (passing Drew Bledsoe and Jared Goff's record of 45 passes) while also throwing for the second most passing yards ever in a playoff game.

=== 2021 ===
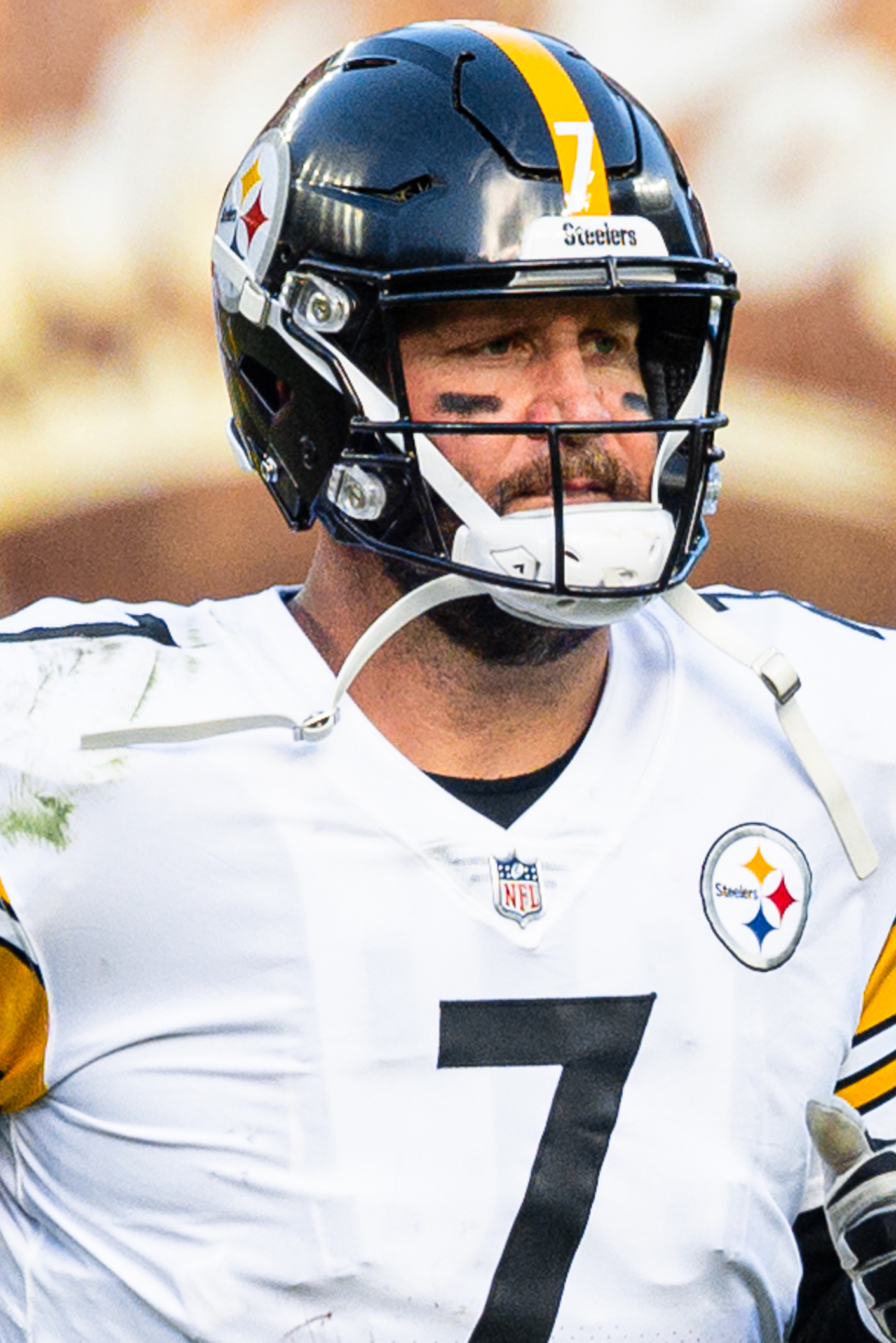
Roethlisberger during his final season with the Steelers

Roethlisberger signed a renegotiated contract with the Steelers on March 4, 2021, that saw him take a $5 million pay cut. Roethlisberger began his final season with a Week 1 victory over the Buffalo Bills. He scored his first touchdown of the season with a five yard pass to Diontae Johnson. It would be his only score of the game as he completed 18-of-32 passes for 188 yards and not committing any turnovers. Despite losing 24–10 to division rivals, the Cincinnati Bengals, Roethlisberger threw for a season high 318 yards, completed 38 out of 58 pass attempts and threw one touchdown pass against two interceptions. During October 10's 27–19 win over the Denver Broncos, Roethlisberger had his first multiple touchdown game of the year, opening the game with a 50 yard touchdown pass to Johnson and an 18 yard pass to Chase Claypool. This kickstarted a four game win streak for the Steelers. Across those four games, Roethlisberger threw for six touchdowns, committed no turnovers and completed 67%, (87 out of 129) pass attempts for 953 yards. The Steelers' streak was halted when, a day before the Week 10 game against the Detroit Lions, the Steelers placed Roethlisberger on Reserve/COVID-19 list after testing positive for the virus. He returned for November 21's 41–37 loss to the Los Angeles Chargers in which he threw for 273 yards and three touchdowns.

Roethlisberger played his final game at Heinz Field on January 3, 2022. Leading up to his final game, Roethlisberger's career was memorialized with ESPN hosting a countdown tribute. In his final home game, Roethlisberger threw for 123 yards, a touchdown and an interception, leading the team to a 26–14 victory over the Cleveland Browns and eliminating them from playoff contention. With his helmet still on, in full uniform, Roethlisberger gave an emotional interview after the game and was the last player to leave the field. This win officially cemented Roethlisberger with 164 career wins as a starter, which was the fifth-most in NFL history at the time and ending his record at Heinz Field with a win-loss record of 92–31, the fourth most home victories a quarterback has ever had with a single team in NFL history.

Roethlisberger finished the 2021 regular season with 3,740 passing yards, 22 touchdowns, and ten interceptions, and also had an additional rushing touchdown as the Steelers finished with a 9–7–1 record, earning a spot in the Wild card round as the seven seed. In the Wild Card Round against the Kansas City Chiefs, Roethlisberger threw for 215 yards and two touchdowns in the 42–21 loss.

== Retirement ==
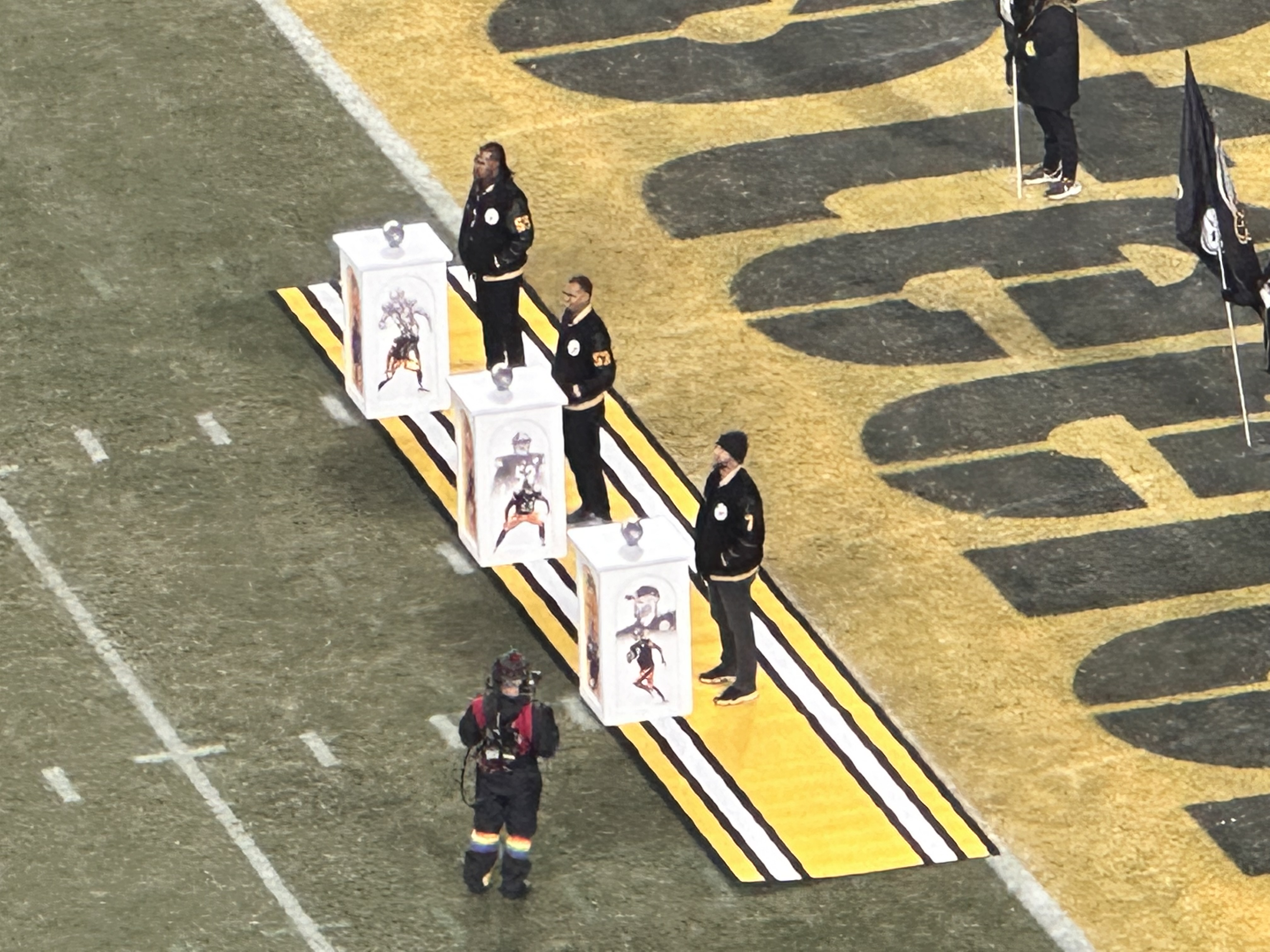
Roethlisberger (far right) being inducted into the Steelers’ Hall of Honor during halftime on Monday Night Football in 2025

On January 27, 2022, Roethlisberger announced his retirement from the NFL.

After Tampa Bay Buccaneers quarterback Tom Brady unretired in March of that year, some wondered if Roethlisberger would also come back for another season. Roethlisberger was quick to silence those questions when he told WDVE in Pittsburgh, "First off, my coach and GM don't want me back. Second off, I'm pretty content with where I'm at." In March 2023, Roethlisberger revealed to Mark Madden however that the San Francisco 49ers did show some interest after suffering injuries with Trey Lance and Jimmy Garoppolo left Brock Purdy as the starting quarterback, but Roethlisberger declined. In February 2025, Roethlisberger mentioned on the Nate Bargatze podcast that the New York Jets reached out to him in 2023 after Aaron Rodgers tore his Achilles tendon, which he promptly declined.

Although the Steelers generally do not retire jersey numbers, having only retired the numbers of Joe Greene and Franco Harris (both from the Steelers dynasty years of the 1970s) since the team lifted its decades-long ban on retiring numbers in 2014 (with Ernie Stautner being the only other player with his number retired), the team has not reissued Roethlisberger's number 7 since his retirement. It is generally understood that no Steeler will ever wear number 7 again.

=== Footbahlin with Ben Roethlisberger ===
On September 2, 2022, Roethlisberger began the podcast Footbahlin with Ben Roethlisberger on his Channel 7 YouTube channel. Co-hosted by Pittsburgh-based musician and producer Spencer Te'o, Roethlisberger and Te'o started the first few episodes mainly discussing Roethlisberger's life after retirement, stories from his tenure with the Steelers and beer tasting. The show eventually evolved into having guest interviews with current and former players and coaches such as Kenny Pickett, Jerome Bettis, Bill Cowher and Mike Tomlin. During the 2023 season, the show began to incorporate Roethlisberger and Te'o watching various Steeler games and providing commentary.

The final episode was uploaded on December 25, 2023, with an episode about the Steelers' victory over the Cincinnati Bengals on Christmas Eve. In an interview with WDVE in 2024, Roethlisberger claimed that the podcast would not continue. Despite this announcement, Roethlisberger uploaded a surprise teaser for another season of the podcast on August 29, 2024, to begin the following week. Beginning with the new season, Roethlisberger and Te'o began inviting a variety of guests not just limited to Steelers players. This includes guests such as comedian Nate Bargatze and musician Bart Millard of MercyMe.

== Career statistics ==
Legend
	Won the Super Bowl
	Led the league
**Bold**	Career high

=== NFL ===
==== Regular season ====
Year	Team	Games			Passing									Rushing					Sacked		Fumbles (Note: Regular season fumbles lost data taken from NFL.com)	
Year	Team	GP	GS	Record	Cmp	Att	Pct	Yds	Y/A	Lng	TD	Int	Rtg	Att	Yds	Avg	Lng	TD	Sck	YdsL	Fum	Lost
2004	PIT	14	13	**13–0**	196	295	66.4	2,621	**8.9**	58	17	11	98.1	**56**	144	2.6	20	1	30	213	2	2
2005	PIT	12	12	9–3	168	268	62.7	2,385	**8.9**	85	17	9	98.6	31	69	2.2	13	**3**	23	129	2	1
2006	PIT	15	15	7–8	280	469	59.7	3,513	7.5	67	18	**23**	75.4	32	98	3.1	20	2	46	280	5	2
2007	PIT	15	15	10–5	264	404	65.3	3,154	7.8	83	32	11	**104.1**	35	**204**	5.8	30T	2	47	347	9	3
2008	PIT	16	16	12–4	281	469	59.9	3,301	7.0	65	17	15	80.1	34	101	3.0	17	2	46	284	**14**	**7**
2009	PIT	15	15	9–6	337	506	66.6	4,328	8.6	60	26	12	100.5	40	82	2.1	15	2	**50**	**348**	7	3
2010	PIT	12	12	9–3	240	389	61.7	3,200	8.2	56	17	5	97.0	34	176	5.2	**31**	2	32	220	7	3
2011	PIT	15	15	11–4	324	513	63.2	4,077	7.9	95	21	14	90.1	31	70	2.3	11	0	40	269	8	5
2012	PIT	13	13	7–6	284	449	63.3	3,265	7.3	82	26	8	97.0	26	92	3.5	14	0	30	182	6	3
2013	PIT	16	16	8–8	375	584	64.2	4,261	7.3	67	28	14	92.0	27	99	3.7	19	1	42	282	9	6
2014	PIT	16	16	11–5	408	608	67.1	4,952	8.1	94	32	9	103.3	33	27	0.8	8	0	33	172	9	5
2015	PIT	12	11	7–4	319	469	**68.0**	3,938	8.4	69	21	16	94.5	15	29	1.9	13	0	20	141	2	0
2016	PIT	14	14	10–4	328	509	64.4	3,819	7.5	72	29	13	95.4	16	14	0.9	14	1	17	141	8	2
2017	PIT	15	15	12–3	360	561	64.2	4,251	7.6	**97**	28	14	93.4	28	47	1.7	14	0	21	139	3	1
2018	PIT	16	16	9–6–1	**452**	**675**	67.0	**5,129**	7.6	**97**	**34**	16	96.5	31	98	3.2	18	**3**	24	166	7	2
2019	PIT	2	2	0–2	35	62	56.5	351	5.7	45	0	1	66.0	1	7	**7.0**	7	0	2	7	1	0
2020	PIT	15	15	12–3	399	608	65.6	3,803	6.3	84	33	10	94.1	25	11	0.4	11	0	13	118	5	1
2021	PIT	16	16	9–7	390	605	64.5	3,740	6.2	59	22	10	86.8	20	5	0.3	8	1	38	239	11	5
Career		249	247	165–81–1	5,440	8,443	64.4	64,088	7.6	97	418	211	93.5	515	1,373	2.7	31	20	554	3,677	115	51

==== Postseason ====
Year	Team	Games			Passing									Rushing					Sacked		Fumbles (Note: Postseason fumbles lost data taken from Pro Football Archives)	
Year	Team	GP	GS	Record	Cmp	Att	Pct	Yds	Y/A	Lng	TD	Int	Rtg	Att	Yds	Avg	Lng	TD	Sck	YdsL	Fum	Lost
2004	PIT	2	2	1–1	31	54	57.4	407	7.5	34	3	**5**	61.3	9	**75**	**8.3**	**20**	0	2	11	1	0
2005	PIT	4	4	**4–0**	58	93	62.4	**803**	**8.6**	54	**7**	3	101.7	19	37	1.9	10	**2**	6	35	0	0
2007	PIT	1	1	0–1	29	42	69.0	337	8.0	37	2	3	79.2	4	13	3.3	6	0	6	40	1	**1**
2008	PIT	3	3	3–0	54	89	60.7	692	7.8	**65**	3	1	91.6	5	0	0.0	4	0	8	**58**	0	0
2010	PIT	3	3	2–1	54	91	59.3	622	6.8	58	4	4	76.4	**21**	63	3.0	18	1	**9**	48	**3**	**1**
2011	PIT	1	1	0–1	22	40	55.0	289	7.2	33	1	1	75.9	3	15	5.0	9	0	5	45	1	0
2014	PIT	1	1	0–1	31	45	68.9	334	7.4	44	1	2	79.3	2	16	8.0	16	0	5	37	0	0
2015	PIT	2	2	1–1	42	68	61.8	568	8.4	60	1	0	93.3	0	0	0.0	0	0	6	55	0	0
2016	PIT	3	3	2–1	**64**	**96**	66.7	735	7.7	62	3	4	82.6	8	11	1.4	8	0	2	15	0	0
2017	PIT	1	1	0–1	37	58	63.8	469	8.1	43	5	1	**110.5**	2	16	8.0	15	0	2	7	1	**1**
2020	PIT	1	1	0–1	47	68	**69.1**	501	7.4	33	4	4	85.5	1	0	0.0	0	0	0	0	0	0
2021	PIT	1	1	0–1	29	44	65.9	215	4.9	22	2	0	92.5	2	−1	−0.5	0	0	2	14	1	0
Career		23	23	13–10	498	788	63.2	5,972	7.6	65	36	28	86.7	76	245	3.2	20	3	53	365	8	3

==== Super Bowl ====
Season	SB	Opp.	Passing								Rushing				Result
Season	SB	Opp.	Cmp	Att	Pct	Yds	Y/A	TD	Int	Rtg	Att	Yds	Y/A	TD	Result
2005	XL	SEA	9	21	42.9	123	5.9	0	**2**	22.6	**7**	25	3.6	**1**	**W** 21–10
2008	XLIII	ARI	21	30	**70.0**	256	**8.5**	1	1	**93.2**	3	2	0.7	0	**W** 27–23
2010	XLV	GB	**25**	**40**	62.5	**263**	6.6	**2**	**2**	77.4	4	**31**	**7.8**	0	L 31–25
Total			55	91	60.4	642	7.1	3	5	69.9	14	58	4.1	1	W−L 2−1

=== College ===
Season	Games		Passing							Rushing			
Season	GP	Record	Cmp	Att	Pct	Yds	Y/A	TD	Int	Att	Yds	Avg	TD
2000	0	—	Redshirt										
2001	12	7–5	241	381	63.3	3,105	8.1	21	2	**120**	**189**	1.6	**3**
2002	12	7–5	271	428	63.3	3,238	7.6	22	**11**	82	54	0.7	1
2003	14	**13–1**	**342**	**495**	**69.1**	**4,486**	**9.1**	**37**	10	67	111	**1.7**	**3**
Career	38	27–11	854	1,304	65.5	10,829	8.3	80	23	269	354	1.3	7

== Career highlights ==
=== Awards and honors ===
NFL

- 2× Super Bowl champion (XL, XLIII)
- 3× AFC champion (2005, 2008, 2010)
- NFL Offensive Rookie of the Year (2004)
- 6× Pro Bowl (2007, 2011, 2014–2017)
- 2× NFL passing yards leader (2014, 2018)
- PFWA All-Rookie Team (2004)
- Pittsburgh Steelers Hall of Honor
- 9× NFL Top 100 — 41st (2011), 30th (2012), 61st (2013), 31st (2014), 26th (2015), 21st (2016), 22nd (2017), 18th (2018), 44th (2019)
- AFC Offensive Player of the Month (November 2013)
- 18× AFC Offensive Player of the Week (Week 6, 2004; Week 10, 2007; Week 16, 2007; Week 5, 2008; Week 15, 2009; Week 17, 2010; Week 5, 2011; Week 8, 2011; Week 11, 2013; Week 8, 2014; Week 9, 2014; Week 2, 2015; Week 10, 2015; Week 4, 2016; Week 14, 2017; Week 3, 2018; Week 10, 2018; Week 10, 2020)
- Pro Football Weekly NFL Offensive Player of the Week (Week 15, 2009)

College

- Third-team All-American (2003)
- MAC Most Valuable Player (2003)
- MAC Offensive Player of the Year (2003)
- MAC Freshman of the Year (2001)
- 2× Second-team All-MAC (2001, 2002)
- Miami RedHawks No. 7 retired

=== Records ===
==== NFL records ====
- Regular season wins in a season, rookie quarterback – 13 (2004)
- Longest regular season win streak to start a career for an NFL quarterback – 15 games (won all 13 starts in the 2004 season, won first 2 games of the 2005 season)
- Youngest starting quarterback to win the Super Bowl (2005; second-youngest QB to play in the Super Bowl, behind Dan Marino)
- Most career 500+ yard passing games (4)
- Most games with a perfect passer rating in the same season: 2 (2007; tied) (Note: Tied with Lamar Jackson)
- Most touchdown passes in consecutive games (12)
- Most completions in a playoff or regular season game (47)

==== Pittsburgh Steelers franchise records ====
- Career passing yards – 64,088
- Career passing touchdowns – 418
- Career interceptions thrown – 211
- Career passer rating (Min. 20 attempts) – 93.5
- Career completion percentage (Min. 20 attempts) – 64.4%
- Longest completion – 97 (October 29, 2017, and November 25, 2018)
- Career pass attempts – 8,443
- Career pass completions – 5,440
- Career 400+ yard passing games – 12
- Career 500+ yard passing games – 4
- Completion percentage, single season – 67.1% (2014)
- Touchdown passes, single season – 34 (2018)
- Single season passer rating – 104.1 (2007)
- Passing yards in a season – 5,129 (2018)
- Pass completions in a season – 452 (2018)
- Passing yards in a game – 522 (October 26, 2014)
- Pass completions in a game – 44 (December 10, 2017)
- Touchdown passes, game – 6 (October 26, 2014, and November 2, 2014)

==== Miami Redhawks records ====
All records are from the Miami University 2008 media guide.

- Most games in a season w/200+ yards passing – 14 (2003; NCAA record)
- Consecutive games in a season w/200+ yards passing – 14 (2003; NCAA record)
- Most pass attempts, career – 1,304 (2001–03)
- Most pass attempts, season – 495 (2003)
- Most pass completions, career – 854 (2001–03)
- Most pass completions, season – 342 (2003)
- Most pass completions, game – 41
- Most passing yards, career – 10,829 (2001–03)
- Most passing yards, season – 4,486 (2003)
- Most passing yards, game – 525
- Most passing touchdowns, career – 84 (2001–03)
- Most passing touchdowns, season – 37 (2003)
- Most passing touchdowns, game – 5
- Most total offense yards, career – 11,075 (2001–03)
- Most total offense yards, season – 4,597 (2003)
- Most total offense yards, game – 485
- Most 300+ yard passing games – 14
- Most 400+ yard passing games – 4
- Most games w/ 4+ touchdown passes – 7
- Highest completion %, career (Min. 300 attempts) – 65.5% (2001–03)
- Highest completion %, season (Min. 100 attempts) – 69.1% (2003)

=== Comebacks/game-winning drives ===
Roethlisberger set an NFL rookie record in 2004 with five comeback wins in the fourth quarter, and six game-winning drives in the fourth quarter/overtime (including one playoff game). Roethlisberger has the most comeback wins (19) and game-winning drives (25) through the first seven seasons of a player's career. He is the only quarterback in NFL history to reach 20 comeback wins before the age of 30. Upon his retirement following the 2021 season, Roethlisberger was tied for the 2nd most game-winning drives of all time (53), and in sole possession of 2nd most game-winning drives including the playoffs (57).

== Charitable works ==
Roethlisberger started a foundation with the following mission statement: "The Ben Roethlisberger Foundation seeks to (a): provide support for police and fire departments throughout the United States with a particular emphasis on service dogs and (b): to enhance the quality of life for residents of Findlay, Ohio and Pittsburgh, Pennsylvania."

In 2005, Roethlisberger donated one game check to aid the tsunami relief fund. He has also donated over $100,000 to fund police dogs in Pittsburgh.

In October 2014, Roethlisberger and his wife donated $1 million to his alma mater, Miami University, for an indoor sports center.

== Personal life ==
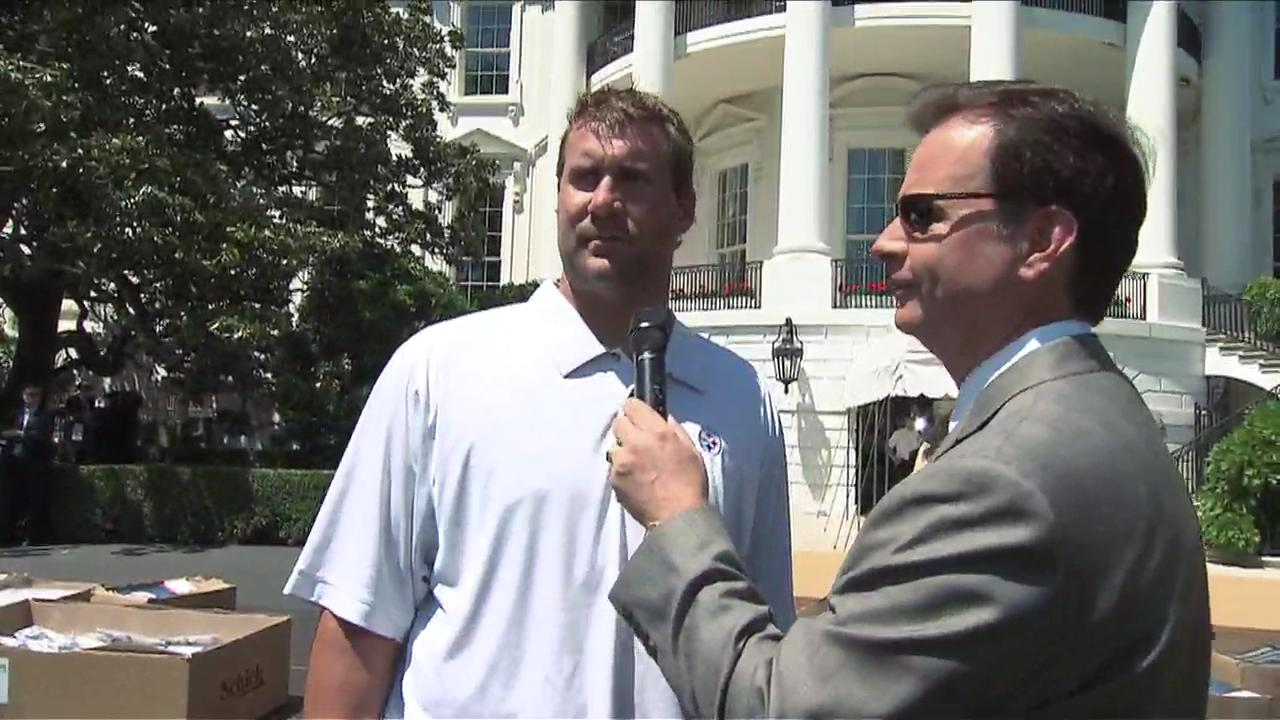
Roethlisberger during the Steelers' visit to the White House in 2009, being interviewed by Bob Pompeani.

On July 23, 2011, Roethlisberger married Ashley Harlan, a physician assistant from New Castle, Pennsylvania. He and his wife have two sons and one daughter.

Roethlisberger is a Christian. Roethlisberger grew up as a Christian, but recommitted to his faith in 2017. Roethlisberger has said "Go ahead and be the best athlete you can possibly be, and see if you can be a better Christian. That's what I'm trying to do now. I'm trying to be a better Christian than I am athlete and football player."

Roethlisberger is a spokesman for Swiss Roots, a campaign intended to help Americans of Swiss origin reconnect with their Swiss ancestral heritage. In May 2006, Roethlisberger and his family traveled to Switzerland for a week.

He has his own line of barbecue sauce, Big Ben's BBQ, and is an investor in tech startups, including neonatal care company, NeoLight.

=== Motorcycle accident ===
On June 12, 2006, Roethlisberger was involved in a motorcycle accident near downtown Pittsburgh. He was not wearing a helmet and did not have a valid Pennsylvania motorcycle license at the time, only a temporary permit that had expired in March. Roethlisberger was traveling east on Second Avenue when a car turned in front of him at the South Tenth Street Bridge, causing a collision. According to eyewitnesses, Roethlisberger went over the handlebars of his bike, shattering the windshield of the car with his head. Though initial reports described the injuries as non-life-threatening, Roethlisberger later said paramedics had to stop bleeding in his throat to save his life. He was taken to Mercy Hospital in "serious but stable" condition.

Roethlisberger suffered significant facial injuries, including fractures to his jaw and sinus cavity, a broken nose, a nine-inch head laceration, the loss of two teeth, and several chipped teeth. He underwent immediate surgery to repair the damage and was upgraded to fair condition the following day. A subsequent news conference with hospital staff was brief, but confirmed early reports that the most serious injuries were to the head and face. He was released from the hospital on June 14 and issued a public apology the next day, in which he also stated, "If I ever ride again, it certainly will be with a helmet." Roethlisberger was allegedly videotaped by KDKA-TV staff riding without a helmet a few months later, but the existence of said tape is disputed.

Roethlisberger recovered quickly enough to start all three Steelers preseason games later that summer. On June 19, Pittsburgh police cited him for failure to wear a helmet and operating outside his license class. Under Pennsylvania law, helmets are only optional for riders who have held a motorcycle license for at least two years. The driver of the other vehicle was cited for failure to yield the right of way.

=== Sexual assault allegations ===
==== Lake Tahoe ====
In July 2009, Andrea McNulty, 31, filed a civil lawsuit in the Washoe County, Nevada District Court, accusing Roethlisberger of sexually assaulting her in June 2008 at his hotel room in Stateline, Nevada, during a celebrity golf tournament. Roethlisberger was one of nine defendants named in the case, and his attorney denied the allegations. The lawsuit sought damages from Roethlisberger and additional damages from officials at Harrah's Lake Tahoe, alleging they helped cover up the incident. The case was settled in December 2011.

According to McNulty, she was working as an executive casino host at the time when Roethlisberger struck up a friendly conversation with her during the tournament. The following night, she claimed he called her to report a problem with his television's sound system and asked her to check it. McNulty said she found the TV working properly, but as she turned to leave, Roethlisberger allegedly blocked the door, grabbed her, and began kissing her. The lawsuit states that she sought hospital treatment after the incident. A second lawsuit filed by another Harrah's employee claimed that the quarterback was friends with a Harrah's executive overseeing operations in northern Nevada. McNulty's suit alleged that her boss told her, "That guy [Roethlisberger] can have anyone he wants."

In August 2009, the Pittsburgh Post-Gazette published an affidavit from Angela Antonetti, McNulty's former co-worker, submitted as part of a motion to move the case to Douglas County, Nevada. Antonetti stated that McNulty had previously bragged about having consensual sex with Roethlisberger, expressed hope of becoming pregnant with a "little Roethlisberger", and had asked her to travel to Pittsburgh in an attempt to "run into" him. Antonetti said she was "absolutely shocked" to hear about the lawsuit and believed the allegations were false.

==== Milledgeville, Georgia ====
On March 5, 2010, it was revealed that police in Milledgeville, Georgia, investigated Roethlisberger for an alleged sexual assault which occurred inside the women's restroom at the Capital City nightclub. The accuser, a 20-year-old student at nearby Georgia College & State University, had been seen earlier in the evening at several establishments with Roethlisberger, including posing for a photograph with him. Roethlisberger spoke with police the same night, admitting he had contact with the woman, but claimed it was not "consummated", and that she later slipped and injured herself.

Roethlisberger hired lawyer Ed Garland, who previously defended Baltimore Ravens linebacker Ray Lewis in his murder trial. The accuser was treated at Oconee Regional Medical Center, where an emergency-room doctor and two nurses reported a "superficial laceration and bruising and slight bleeding in the genital area", though they could not determine whether the injuries were caused by trauma or assault. A rape kit was collected, but no semen was found. The woman reportedly told medical staff, "A boy kind of raped me."

According to the accuser, Roethlisberger invited her and her friends to the VIP area and encouraged them to take multiple shots of alcohol. She claimed that one of Roethlisberger's bodyguards, Coraopolis, Pennsylvania police officer and undercover DEA agent Anthony Barravecchio, led her down a hallway to the restroom and left. However, witnesses stated that Barravecchio placed his hand on her shoulder and gently guided her toward the restroom where the assault allegedly took place, a claim his lawyer denied. The woman said that once alone, Roethlisberger exposed himself, and despite her protests, followed her into the bathroom when she attempted to leave. She further alleged that her friends tried to intervene, but Roethlisberger's second bodyguard, Pennsylvania State Police Trooper Edward Joyner, ignored them and denied knowing what they were talking about. Both officers later claimed to have no memory of meeting the accuser.

Milledgeville Police Sergeant Jerry Blash, who had posed for a photograph with Roethlisberger earlier in the evening, was the first to respond. He later admitted to denigrating the accuser and failed to formally question Roethlisberger. In April 2010, District Attorney Fred Bright announced that no charges would be filed. The accuser, through her attorney, said she no longer wished to pursue criminal charges due to the intense media scrutiny, but emphasized that she was not recanting her allegation. Following the announcement, Steelers president Art Rooney II was reported to be "furious". Pittsburgh-based company PLB Sports terminated a sponsorship with Roethlisberger marketed "Big Ben's Beef Jerky". Blash resigned from the police force on April 15. Barravecchio faced no disciplinary action, although the Coraopolis Solicitor reviewed the 500-page Georgia Bureau of Investigation file. Barravecchio's interview with the GBI was not among the materials released. Joyner was barred from continuing to work for Roethlisberger and later lost a grievance case challenging that decision.

=== 2010 suspension ===
Roethlisberger was suspended for six games during the 2010 NFL season for violating the league's personal conduct policy, and was ordered to undergo a league-mandated "professional behavior evaluation" and "must adhere to any counseling or treatment that is recommended by the professional evaluators." The suspension was subsequently reduced to four games.

== In popular culture ==
The "Roethlisburger"

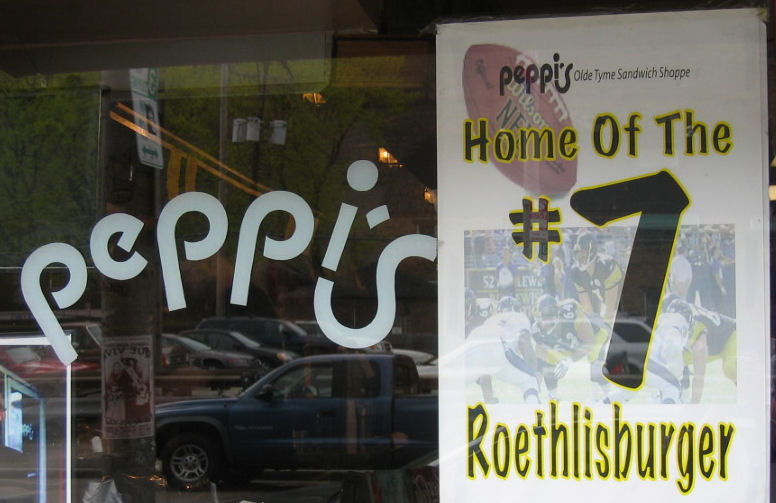
Peppi's restaurant, home of the "Roethlisburger"

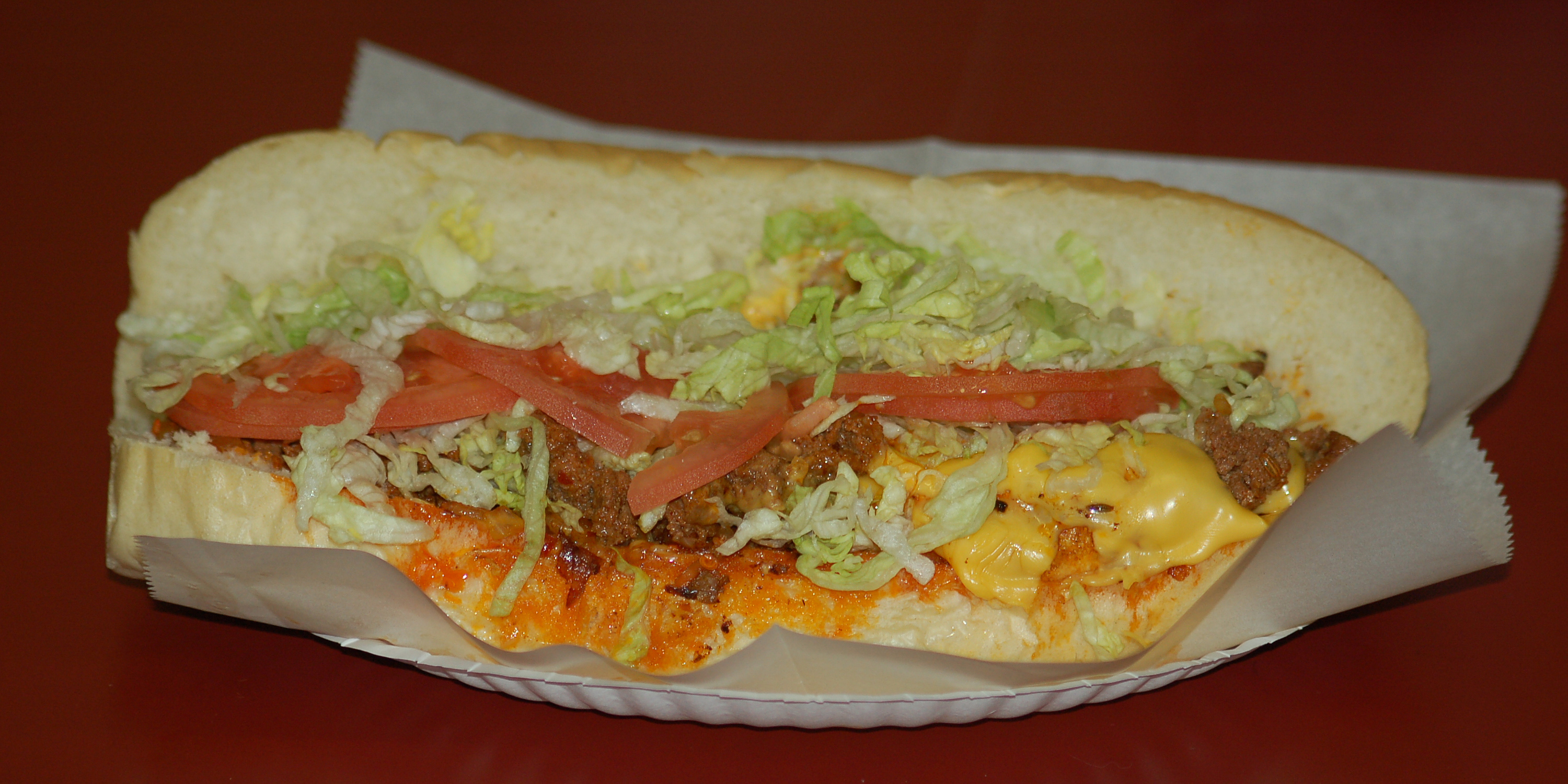
The "#7 Roethlisburger"

Roethlisberger is the namesake of multiple sandwiches, which are usually named using a pun on his last name's similarity to "burger" or "hamburger". For instance, the Pittsburgh restaurant chain Peppi's sells the "Roethlisburger", at a price of $7.00, in correlation with his jersey number "7", and also having ingredients that describe his playing style (scrambled eggs for "scrambler", beef and sausage for his size and strength). A Findlay, Ohio, restaurant named Tony's and an Oxford, Ohio, restaurant named Brick Street also sell "Roethlisburger" sandwiches.

He has appeared on the Late Show with David Letterman after both of his Super Bowl victories. At the 2006 Grammy Awards, one week after Pittsburgh won Super Bowl XL, Roethlisberger introduced Kelly Clarkson. In 2009, he hosted WWE Raw. He, along with other Steelers players, made a cameo appearance as a member of the Gotham Rogues football team in the 2012 film The Dark Knight Rises.

Roethlisberger would also be mentioned or parodied in works in which he had no involvement. This would include an episode of The King of Queens in which Arthur Spooner (Jerry Stiller) purchases a Roethlisberger jersey while in a layover at Pittsburgh International Airport, an episode of South Park that parodies the aforementioned sexual assault charges, and an infamous scene in the movie Zack and Miri Make a Porno (both filmed and set in the Pittsburgh suburb of Monroeville, Pennsylvania) where a drunken Steelers fan asks two characters in the middle of a sex scene and fully nude (oblivious to the situation due to his high intoxication) if they watched the game and that Roethlisberger was screaming "huck it, chuck it, football!".

== See also ==
- List of 500-yard passing games in the National Football League
- List of National Football League career passer rating leaders
- List of National Football League career quarterback wins leaders
- List of NFL quarterbacks who have posted a perfect passer rating
- List of National Football League quarterback playoff records

== Additional sources ==
- Staff (September 2006) "Ben Roethlisberger 1982–" Biography Today 15(3): pp. 102–117
