= Belaire High School =

Location
- 12121 Tams Dr. Baton Rouge, Louisiana, 70815; United States; 30.466893°N 91.049044°W

Information
- Type: Free public
- Established: 1974
- School district: East Baton Rouge Parish
- Principal: Verdie Batiste
- Teaching staff: 54.99 (FTE)
- Grades: 9–12
- Enrollment: 808 (2023-2024)
- Student to teacher ratio: 14.69
- Campus type: Urban
- Colors: Royal blue and orange
- Mascot: Bengal tiger
- Nickname: Bengals
- Yearbook: Veda
- Website: ebrschools.org/schools/belairemagnethigh/

Belaire High School (usually abbreviated as "Belaire" or BHS) is a public school in East Baton Rouge Parish. It is located in Baton Rouge, Louisiana. The school is a part of the East Baton Rouge Parish Public Schools.

== Communities served ==
Belaire serves sections of Baton Rouge and the Monticello census-designated place.

At one time it served a section of Central before the city started its own school district.

== Feeder patterns ==
The following elementary schools feed into Belaire:

- Glen Oaks Park
- Greenbrier
- La Belle Aire
- Lanier
- Park Forest
- Riveroaks
- Villa del Rey
- Broadmoor (partial)
- Howell Park (partial)
- Sharon Hills (partial)
- Twin Oaks (partial)
- Red Oaks

The following middle schools feed into Belaire:

- Broadmoor
- Park Forest
- Southeast
- Glen Oaks (partial)
- Sherwood Middle

== Notable alumni ==
- Brad Davis - college football coach
- Dana Moore - NFL player
- Mewelde Moore - NFL player
- Marcus Spears - NFL player
