= Dana Moore =

American football player (born 1961)

No. 6
- Position: Punter

Personal information
- Born: September 7, 1961 (age 65); Baton Rouge, Louisiana, U.S.
- Listed height: 5 ft 11 in (1.80 m)
- Listed weight: 180 lb (82 kg)

Career information
- High school: Belaire (Baton Rouge)
- College: Mississippi State (1979–1982)
- NFL draft: 1983: undrafted

Career history
- Washington Federals (1983–1984); San Francisco 49ers (1985)*; Philadelphia Eagles (1986)*; New York Giants (1987)
- * Offseason or practice squad member only

Career NFL statistics
- Games played: 2
- Stats at Pro Football Reference

Dana Earl Moore (born September 7, 1961) is an American former professional football player who was a punter for the New York Giants of the National Football League (NFL). He played college football for the Mississippi State Bulldogs.
