= Mewelde Moore =

American football player (born 1982)

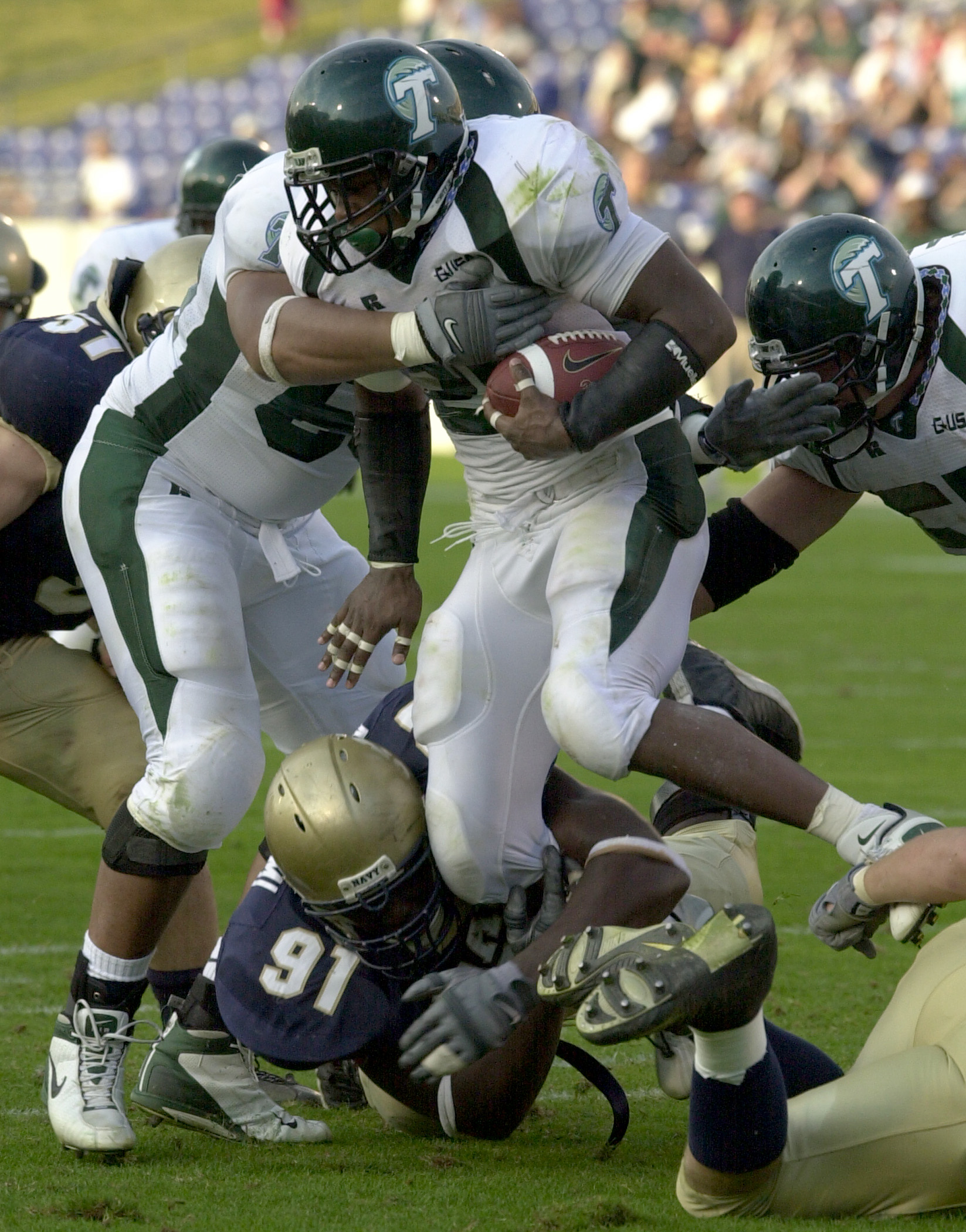
- Moore rushing for Tulane in 2003

No. 30, 21, 26
- Position: Running back

Personal information
- Born: July 24, 1982 (age 44); Hammond, Louisiana, U.S.
- Listed height: 5 ft 11 in (1.80 m)
- Listed weight: 209 lb (95 kg)

Career information
- High school: Belaire (Baton Rouge, Louisiana)
- College: Tulane (2000–2003)
- NFL draft: 2004: 4th round, 119th overall pick

Career history
- Minnesota Vikings (2004–2007); Pittsburgh Steelers (2008–2011); Indianapolis Colts (2012)

Awards and highlights
- Super Bowl champion (XLIII); 3× All-Conference USA (2001–03)

Career NFL statistics
- Rushing yards: 2,267
- Rushing touchdowns: 6
- Receiving yards: 1,952
- Receiving touchdowns: 8
- Return yards: 1,631
- Return touchdowns: 2
- Stats at Pro Football Reference

Mewelde Jaem Cadere Moore (born July 24, 1982) is an American former professional football player who was a running back in the National Football League (NFL). He was selected by the Minnesota Vikings in the fourth round of the 2004 NFL draft. Moore also played with the Pittsburgh Steelers, winning Super Bowl XLIII. He played college football for the Tulane Green Wave, just down the road from his hometown of Baton Rouge, Louisiana where he was a standout performer at Belaire High School.

== College career ==
Moore is only the second player in NCAA history to rush for 4,000 yards and have 2,000 yards receiving in a career, joining former Viking Darrin Nelson (Stanford). Known for his high-stepping gait and effective straight-arm tactics, Moore ranks 11th in Division I history in all-purpose yards with 6,505 yards. He ran for 100+ yards in 22 games to set Tulane and Conference USA records. His 36 career TDs rank second in Tulane and C-USA history. Moore ran for 1,138 yards as a junior and 1,421 as a sophomore, respectively, to set Tulane's single-season rushing record. Moore was also drafted in the fourth round of the 2000 Major League Baseball draft by the San Diego Padres. He spent three summers in the organization while in college.

=== 2000 ===
In 2000, Moore was named C-USA's Freshman of the Year. He was also a Freshman All-America choice by The Sporting News and Football News. Moore started 7 of the 10 games he played in on the season for the Tulane Green Wave. He hauled in a 74-yard scoring pass against Army. Posted a season-high 131 rushing yards and had 56 receiving yards against East Carolina. He carried the ball for 114 yards against Cincinnati. He also had 100-yards rushing against Memphis and Southern Methodist.

=== 2001 ===
In 2001, Moore was named 1st-Team All-C-USA. He also set Tulane single-season rushing record with 1,422 yards. He broke the 100-yard rushing mark 7 times during the season. Moore also set school record with 249 rushing yards on 28 attempts, breaking the old mark by 2 yards that had stood since 1970 by former Tulane Green Wave great David Abercrombie while hauling in 6 passes for 87 yards. He became the first Tulane player to break the 100-yard mark in rushing and receiving, in a game against Navy with 131 rushing yards and 130 receiving. Moore also ran for 201 yards and had 70 yards receiving against Southern. He had a career-best 168 receiving yards with TDs of 32 and 40 yards along with 80 rushing yards and a touchdown against Army.

=== 2002 ===
In 2002, Moore, once again, was named to the All-C-USA team by The Sporting News. Moore became only the second player in Tulane history to run for 1,000 yards in consecutive seasons, joining Eddie Price in 1948–49. Led the team in rushing and receiving. He averaged 129.5 all-purpose yards per game for the season. He scored a pair of ground TDs and caught a touchdown pass against East Carolina. He also ran for season-high 147 yards against Southern. Moore carried the ball 32 times for 136 yards and had 5 catches for 58 yards against Southern Mississippi. He caught a 47-yard TD pass against TCU. Moore ran for 116 yards on 30 carries and had 6 receptions for 80 yards against Hawaii in the Hawaii Bowl.

=== 2003 ===
In 2003, Moore earned 1st-Team C-USA honors. He was named to Doak Walker and Walter Camp Award watch lists honoring the top running back and player in college football. Moore started the first 9 games of the season but missed the final 3 with broken hand that required surgery. He ranked second in C-USA with a 101.0 rushing average per game and 147.0 all-purpose yards per game. Moore ran for 100 yards and had 116 receiving yards against Northwestern State, scoring on passes of 32, 28 and 23 yards. He also, posted 114 rushing yards against Texas and had TD runs of 6 and 32 yards. Also, he ran for season-best 159 yards against Memphis. Moore had 123 yards on the ground and a 25-yard TD against Louisville. Moore recorded 115 yards rushing and 55 receiving against Army before suffering season-ending broken hand. Moore was drafted by the San Diego Padres in the fourth round of the 2000 MLB draft but did not sign.

== Professional career ==
Pre-draft measurables
Height	Weight	Arm length	Hand span	40-yard dash	10-yard split	20-yard split	20-yard shuttle	Three-cone drill	Vertical jump	Broad jump
5 ft 10 5/8 in (1.79 m)	209 lb (95 kg)	30 1/8 in (0.77 m)	9 7/8 in (0.25 m)	4.67 s	1.61 s	2.68 s	4.12 s	7.05 s	35.0 in (0.89 m)	9 ft 10 in (3.00 m)
All values from NFL Combine

=== Minnesota Vikings ===
He was selected by the Minnesota Vikings with the 119th overall pick in the fourth round of the 2004 NFL draft out of Tulane University.

=== Pittsburgh Steelers ===
On March 3, 2008, Moore signed a three-year contract to join the Pittsburgh Steelers. Moore was given the opportunity to start after Willie Parker and Rashard Mendenhall were injured. Although he was a backup for most of the year, he racked up 588 yards and 5 touchdowns rushing and 320 yards and one touchdown receiving. He also has one passing touchdown.

At the end of the 2010 season, Moore and the Steelers appeared in Super Bowl XLV against the Green Bay Packers. He had three rushes for 13 yards and had one kickoff return for 11 yards in the 31–25 loss.

=== Indianapolis Colts ===
During free agency, Mewelde signed a one-year contract with the Colts. He didn't record a touchdown and was waived on October 29, 2012. The Colts re-signed him in December in time to play against Houston, but he lost a key fumble on the Indianapolis goal line in the loss.

== Personal life ==
Moore took 24 credits in spring 2004 so he could graduate on time with a double major in Finance and Accounting from Tulane University. Moore was noted for winning mathematics contests before matriculating at Tulane. Moore is active in the Twin Cities community with the National Football Foundation, United Way, and Memorial Blood Center. Moore was a recipient of the Community Service Award for Business Ethics at the Tulane Council of Entrepreneurs and Business School Council Awards Gala in spring 2003. Moore was a member of the National Honor Society at Belaire High School in Baton Rouge. He also supports youth education through his Mewelde Moore Knowledge First Foundation. Moore regularly visits his alma mater, Tulane for fundraising events. He married his college girlfriend, Tymeka. Chris Berman gave him the nickname "Waltzing" Mewelde, a play on the song Waltzing Matilda. In 2005, he was questioned as a participant in the Minnesota Vikings boat party scandal. His wife Tymeka played basketball for Tulane. His brother-in-law Willie played basketball for University of Houston.
