= 2007 Pittsburgh Steelers season =

Pittsburgh Steelers 75th US football season

- Steelers 75th anniversary logo
- Owner: The Rooney Family
- General manager: Kevin Colbert
- Head coach: Mike Tomlin
- Offensive coordinator: Bruce Arians
- Defensive coordinator: Dick LeBeau
- Home stadium: Heinz Field

Results
- Record: 10–6
- Division place: 1st AFC North
- Playoffs: Lost Wild Card Playoffs (vs. Jaguars) 29–31
- All-Pros: 3: Alan Faneca (1st team); James Harrison (1st team); Troy Polamalu (2nd team)
- Pro Bowlers: 6: G Alan Faneca; NT Casey Hampton; OLB James Harrison; RB Willie Parker; SS Troy Polamalu; QB Ben Roethlisberger
- Team MVP: James Harrison
- Team ROY: Daniel Sepulveda

Uniform

The 2007 Pittsburgh Steelers season was the franchise's 75th season as a professional sports franchise and as a member of the National Football League (NFL). It was the 8th season under leadership of general manager Kevin Colbert and the first under head coach Mike Tomlin, after going 8–8 last season. The Steelers finished the year at 10–6. However, they lost 31–29 at home to the Jacksonville Jaguars in the wild card round.

== Personnel ==
=== Staff ===
2007 Pittsburgh Steelers staff
Front office: Chairman – Daniel M. Rooney; President – Arthur J. Rooney II; Vice president – Arthur J. Rooney, Jr.; Administration advisor – Chuck Noll; Administrative assistant – Diane Lowe; Administrative assistant – Janet Rusnak; Business office; Director of business – Mark Hart; Controller – Bob Tyler; Human relations/office coordinator – Geraldine Glenn; Business & Football Administration coordinator – Omar Khan; Assistant controller – Jodie Spagnolli; Payroll/benefits administrator – Meghan Matesa; Administrative assistant – Rebecca Mihalcik; Administrative assistant – Kelly Serafin; Media relations; Communications coordinator – Dave Lockett; Public relations/media manager – Burt Lauten; Administrative assistant – Vicky Iuni; Intern – Eric Estes; Community relations; Community relations manager – Michele Rosenthal; Administrative assistant – Stacie Lawrence; Photography; Team photographer – Mike Fabus; Photography intern – Danielle Hudak; Information technology; Information technology manager – Scott Phelps; IT/Network Support Technician – Jon Pugliano; Steelers.com/Steelers Digest; Editor – Bob Labriola; Assistant editor/website – Teresa Varley; Football operations; Director of football operations – Kevin Colbert; Pro personnel coordinator – Doug Whaley; College scouting coordinator – Ron Hughes; Special assistant/pro and college personnel – Joe Greene; Pro/college scout – Phil Kreidler; College scout – Mark Gorscak; College scout – Kelvin Fisher; College scout – Bruce McNorton; College scout – Dan Rooney; BLESTO Scout – David Petett; College personnel – Bill Nunn; Administrative assistant – Maureen Mannion; Administrative assistant – Karen Mercalde; Intern – Luke Palko; Head coaches: Head coach – Mike Tomlin; Assistant head coach/defensive line – John Mitchell; Offensive coaches: Offensive coordinator – Bruce Arians; Quarterbacks – Ken Anderson; Running backs – Kirby Wilson; Wide receivers – Randy Fichtner; Tight ends – James Daniel; Offensive line – Larry Zierlein; Offensive assistant – Harold Goodwin	Defensive coaches: Defensive coordinator – Dick LeBeau; Linebackers – Keith Butler; Defensive backs – Ray Horton; Defensive assistant – Lou Spanos; Special teams coaches: Special teams – Bob Ligashesky; Assistant special teams – Amos Jones; Strength and conditioning: Conditioning coach – Garrett Giemont; Conditioning assistant – Marcel Pastoor; Player development – Raymond Jackson; Administrative assistant – Chrissy Bulger; Administrative assistant – Mia Daudet; Medical staff; Physician, internal medicine – Mark Duca; Physician, internal medicine – Tony Yates; Physician, neurosurgery – Joseph Maroon; Physician, orthopedic surgery – James P. Bradley; Athletic training staff; Head athletic trainer – John Norwig; Assistant athletic trainer – Ryan Grove; Assistant athletic trainer – Ariko Iso; Football equipment staff; Equipment manager – Rodgers Freyvogel; Field manager – Rich Baker; Video; Video coordinator – Bob McCartney; Video assistant – Andy Lizanich; Video assistant – TBA

Notable additions include; LaMarr Woodley, Lawrence Timmons, Daniel Sepulveda, William Gay.

== Roster ==
2007 Pittsburgh Steelers roster
Quarterbacks (QB): 16 Charlie Batch; 7 Ben Roethlisberger; 2 Brian St. Pierre; Running backs (RB): 44 Najeh Davenport KR; 38 Carey Davis FB; 34 Verron Haynes; 33 Gary Russell; Wide receivers (WR): 10 Santonio Holmes; 15 Willie Reid KR; 86 Hines Ward; 85 Nate Washington; 80 Cedrick Wilson; Tight ends (TE): 88 Jonathan Dekker; 83 Heath Miller; 89 Matt Spaeth	Offensive linemen (OL): 74 Willie Colon T; 79 Trai Essex T; 66 Alan Faneca G; 68 Chris Kemoeatu G; 61 Sean Mahan C; 73 Kendall Simmons G; 77 Marvel Smith T; 72 Darnell Stapleton G; 78 Max Starks T; Defensive linemen (DL): 93 Nick Eason DE; 98 Casey Hampton NT; 76 Chris Hoke NT; 99 Brett Keisel DE; 90 Travis Kirschke DE; 95 Ryan McBean DE	Linebackers (LB): 55 Marquis Cooper OLB; 51 James Farrior ILB; 50 Larry Foote ILB; 54 Andre Frazier OLB; 53 Clark Haggans OLB; 97 Arnold Harrison OLB; 92 James Harrison OLB; 57 Clint Kriewaldt ILB; 94 Lawrence Timmons ILB; 56 LaMarr Woodley OLB; Defensive backs (DB): 23 Tyrone Carter SS; 22 William Gay CB; 37 Anthony Madison CB; 41 Grant Mason CB/S; 20 Bryant McFadden CB; 43 Troy Polamalu SS; 27 Anthony Smith FS; 24 Ike Taylor CB; 26 Deshea Townsend CB; Special teams (ST): 3 Jeff Reed K; 30 Allen Rossum RS; 9 Daniel Sepulveda P; 60 Greg Warren LS	Practice squad: 81 Dallas Baker WR; 67 Matt Lentz G; 45 Mike Lorello S; 65 Jeremy Parquet T; 71 Scott Paxson DE; 48 Anthony Trucks LB; 28 Justin Vincent RB; 19 Gerran Walker WR; Reserve: 25 Ryan Clark S (IR); 35 Dan Kreider FB (IR); 39 Willie Parker RB (IR); 91 Aaron Smith DE (IR); 84 Jerame Tuman TE (IR); Rookies in italics 53 active, 5 reserve, 8 practice squad

== 2007 NFL draft ==
The 2007 NFL draft took place at Radio City Music Hall in New York City on April 28 and April 29, 2007. The Steelers selected eight players in six rounds.

2007 Pittsburgh Steelers draft
Round	Pick	Player	Position	College	Notes
1	15	Lawrence Timmons *	ILB	Florida State	
2	46	LaMarr Woodley *	OLB	Michigan	
3	77	Matt Spaeth	TE	Minnesota	
4	112	Daniel Sepulveda	P	Baylor	
4	132	Ryan McBean	NT	Oklahoma State	
5	156	Cameron Stephenson	G	Rutgers	
5	170	William Gay	CB	Louisville	
7	227	Dallas Baker	WR	Florida	
Made roster † Pro Football Hall of Fame * Made at least one Pro Bowl during career

== Schedule ==
=== Preseason ===
Week	Date	Opponent	Result	Record	Game site	NFL.com recap
HOF	August 5	vs. New Orleans Saints	**W** 20–7	1–0	Fawcett Stadium (Canton, Ohio)	Recap
2	August 11	Green Bay Packers	**L** 9–13	1–1	Heinz Field	Recap
3	August 18	at Washington Redskins	**W** 12–10	2–1	FedExField	Recap
4	August 26	Philadelphia Eagles	**W** 27–13	3–1	Heinz Field	Recap
5	August 30	at Carolina Panthers	**W** 19–3	4–1	Bank of America Stadium	Recap

=== Regular season ===
Week	Date	Opponent	Result	Record	Game site	NFL.com recap
1	September 9	at **Cleveland Browns**	**W** 34–7	1–0	Cleveland Browns Stadium	Summary
2	September 16	Buffalo Bills	**W** 26–3	2–0	Heinz Field	Summary
3	September 23	San Francisco 49ers	**W** 37–16	3–0	Heinz Field	Summary
4	September 30	at Arizona Cardinals	**L** 14–21	3–1	University of Phoenix Stadium	Summary
5	October 7	Seattle Seahawks	**W** 21–0	4–1	Heinz Field	Summary
6	Bye week					
7	October 21	at Denver Broncos	**L** 28–31	4–2	Invesco Field at Mile High	Summary
8	October 28	at **Cincinnati Bengals**	**W** 24–13	5–2	Paul Brown Stadium	Summary
9	November 5	**Baltimore Ravens**	**W** 38–7	6–2	Heinz Field	Summary
10	November 11	**Cleveland Browns**	**W** 31–28	7–2	Heinz Field	Summary
11	November 18	at New York Jets	**L** 16–19 (OT)	7–3	Giants Stadium	Summary
12	November 26	Miami Dolphins	**W** 3–0	8–3	Heinz Field	Summary
13	December 2	**Cincinnati Bengals**	**W** 24–10	9–3	Heinz Field	Summary
14	December 9	at New England Patriots	**L** 13–34	9–4	Gillette Stadium	Summary
15	December 16	Jacksonville Jaguars	**L** 22–29	9–5	Heinz Field	Summary
16	December 20	at St. Louis Rams	**W** 41–24	10–5	Edward Jones Dome	Summary
17	December 30	at **Baltimore Ravens**	**L** 21–27	10–6	M&T Bank Stadium	Summary

Note: Intra-divisional opponents are in bold text.

== Standings ==
AFC North
	W	L	T	PCT	DIV	CONF	PF	PA	STK
^{(4)} Pittsburgh Steelers	10	6	0	.625	5–1	7–5	393	269	L1
Cleveland Browns	10	6	0	.625	3–3	7–5	402	382	W1
Cincinnati Bengals	7	9	0	.438	3–3	6–6	380	385	W2
Baltimore Ravens	5	11	0	.313	1–5	2–10	275	384	W1

== Pro Bowl selections ==
Six players from the Steelers were selected to play in the 2008 Pro Bowl. Two started (bold), two were selected to the reserve squad, and two did not play due to injury.

- No. 7 Ben Roethlisberger – Quarterback (reserve)
- No. 39 Willie Parker – Running back (injured, did not play)
- No. 43 Troy Polamalu – Strong safety (injured, did not play)
- No. 66 Alan Faneca – Offensive guard
- No. 92 James Harrison – Outside linebacker
- No. 98 Casey Hampton – Defensive tackle (reserve)

== Regular season ==
=== Week 1 (Sunday September 9, 2007): at Cleveland Browns ===
Quarter	1	2	3	4	Total
Steelers	17	0	14	3	34
Browns	0	0	7	0	7

at Cleveland Browns Stadium, Cleveland, Ohio

- Game time: 1:00 p.m.EDT
- Game weather: 71 °F (22 °C) (Cloudy & Rain)
- Game attendance: 73,089
- Referee: Scott Green
- TV announcers (CBS): Kevin Harlan (play by play), Rich Gannon (color commentator)

The Steelers began their anniversary season on the road against their AFC North foe, the Cleveland Browns, for Round 1 of the 2007 Rust Belt series. Also, with both teams at 55 wins a piece, the Steelers would take the lead in the rivalry for the first time in the 57-year history of the rivalry.

Pittsburgh got off to a fast start in the first quarter as QB Ben Roethlisberger completed a 5-yard TD pass to WR Hines Ward. Later, kicker Jeff Reed made a 26-yard field goal, while Roethlisberger completed a 40-yard TD pass to WR Santonio Holmes. After a scoreless second quarter, the Steelers went right back to work in the third quarter, as Roethlisberger completed a 5-yard TD pass to rookie TE Matt Spaeth. Afterwards, the Browns got their only score of the game as QB Derek Anderson completed a 1-yard TD pass to FB Lawrence Vickers. Pittsburgh put the game well out of reach as Roethlisberger threw his career-best 4th touchdown pass of the game, a 22-yard strike to TE Heath Miller. In the fourth quarter, Pittsburgh wrapped up the win with Reed's 31-yard field goal.

With the win, the Steelers began the year at 1–0, gave Mike Tomlin his first win as a head coach, and for the first time in franchise history, took the lead in the Rust Belt series with win #56.

Scoring Drives:

Q1 – PIT – 11:49 – 5-yard TD pass from Ben Roethlisberger to Hines Ward (Jeff Reed kick) (7–0 PIT)
Q1 – PIT – 8:53 – Jeff Reed 26-yard FG (14–0 PIT)
Q1 – PIT – 0:58 – 40-yard TD pass from Ben Roethlisberger to Santonio Holmes (Reed kick) (17–0 PIT)
Q3 – PIT – 10:33 – 5-yard TD pass from Ben Roethlisberger to Matt Spaeth (Reed kick) (24–0 PIT)
Q3 – CLE – 6:52 – 1-yard TD pass from Derek Anderson to Lawrence Vickers (Phil Dawson kick) (24–7 PIT)
Q3 – PIT – 2:23 – 22-yard TD pass from Ben Roethlisberger to Heath Miller (Reed kick) (31–7 PIT)
Q4 – PIT – 7:12 – Jeff Reed 31-yard FG (34–7 PIT)

=== Week 2 (Sunday September 16, 2007): vs. Buffalo Bills ===
Quarter	1	2	3	4	Total
Bills	0	0	3	0	3
Steelers	3	9	7	7	26

at Heinz Field, Pittsburgh, Pennsylvania

- Game time: 1:00 p.m. EDT
- Game weather: 58 °F (14 °C) (Partly Sunny)
- Game attendance: 64,307
- Referee: Larry Nemmers
- TV announcers (CBS): Ian Eagle (play by play), Solomon Wilcots (color commentator)

Coming off their easy road win over the Browns, the Steelers debuted their special throwback uniforms and clashed with the Buffalo Bills in a Week 2 home opener. In the first half, despite the early struggles on offense, the defense kept the Bills back. Meanwhile, kicker Jeff Reed scored a 34-yard field goal in the first quarter, and added 28-yard and 39-yard field goals in the second quarter. In the third quarter, Buffalo would get their only score against Pittsburgh, as kicker Rian Lindell got a 24-yard field goal. Afterwards, the Steelers took over for the rest of the game as QB Ben Roethlisberger completed a 1-yard TD pass to rookie TE Matt Spaeth. In the fourth quarter, Pittsburgh closed out the game with RB Willie Parker getting an 11-yard TD run.

With the win, the Steelers improved to 2–0.

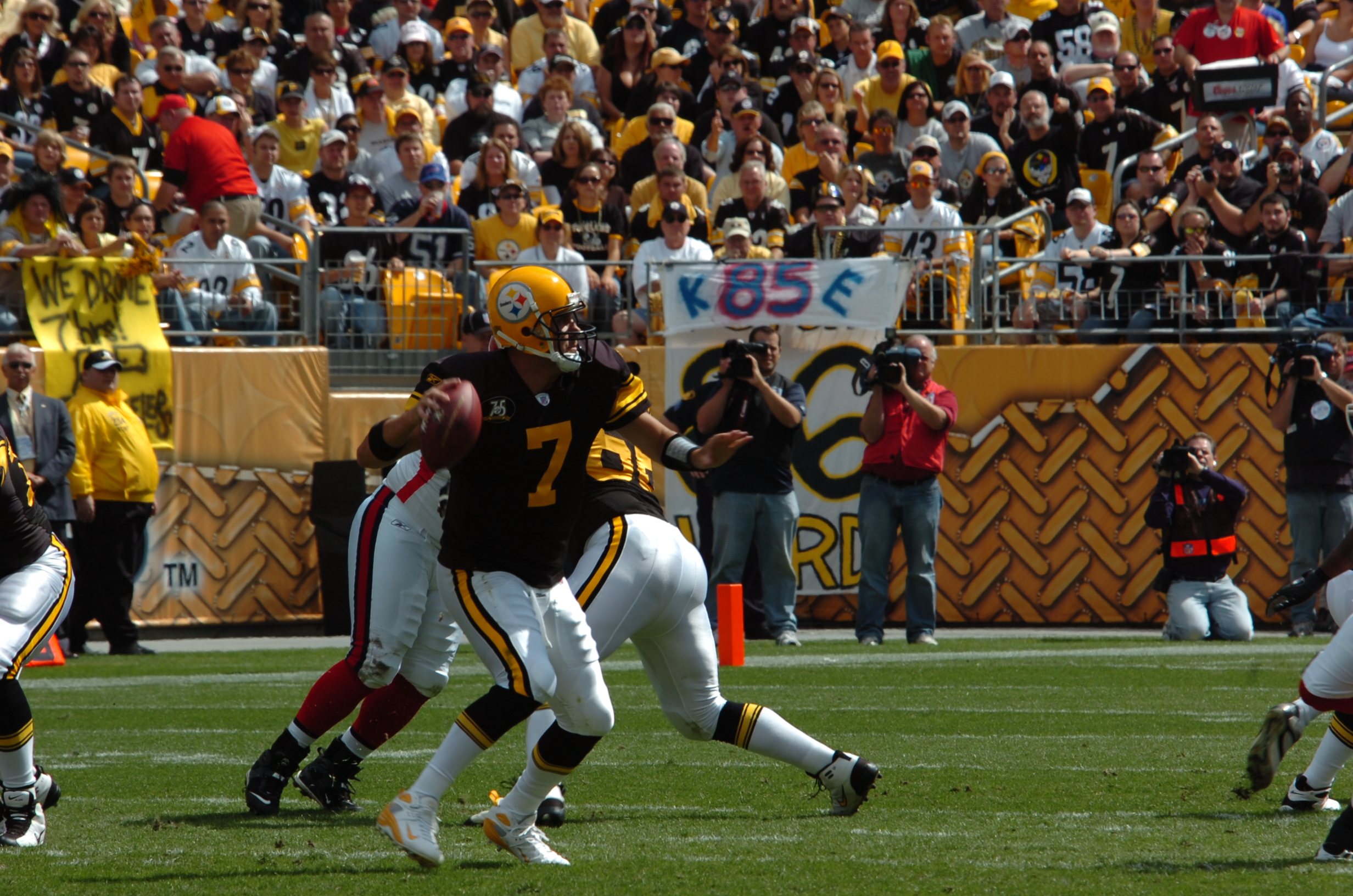
Ben Roethlisberger

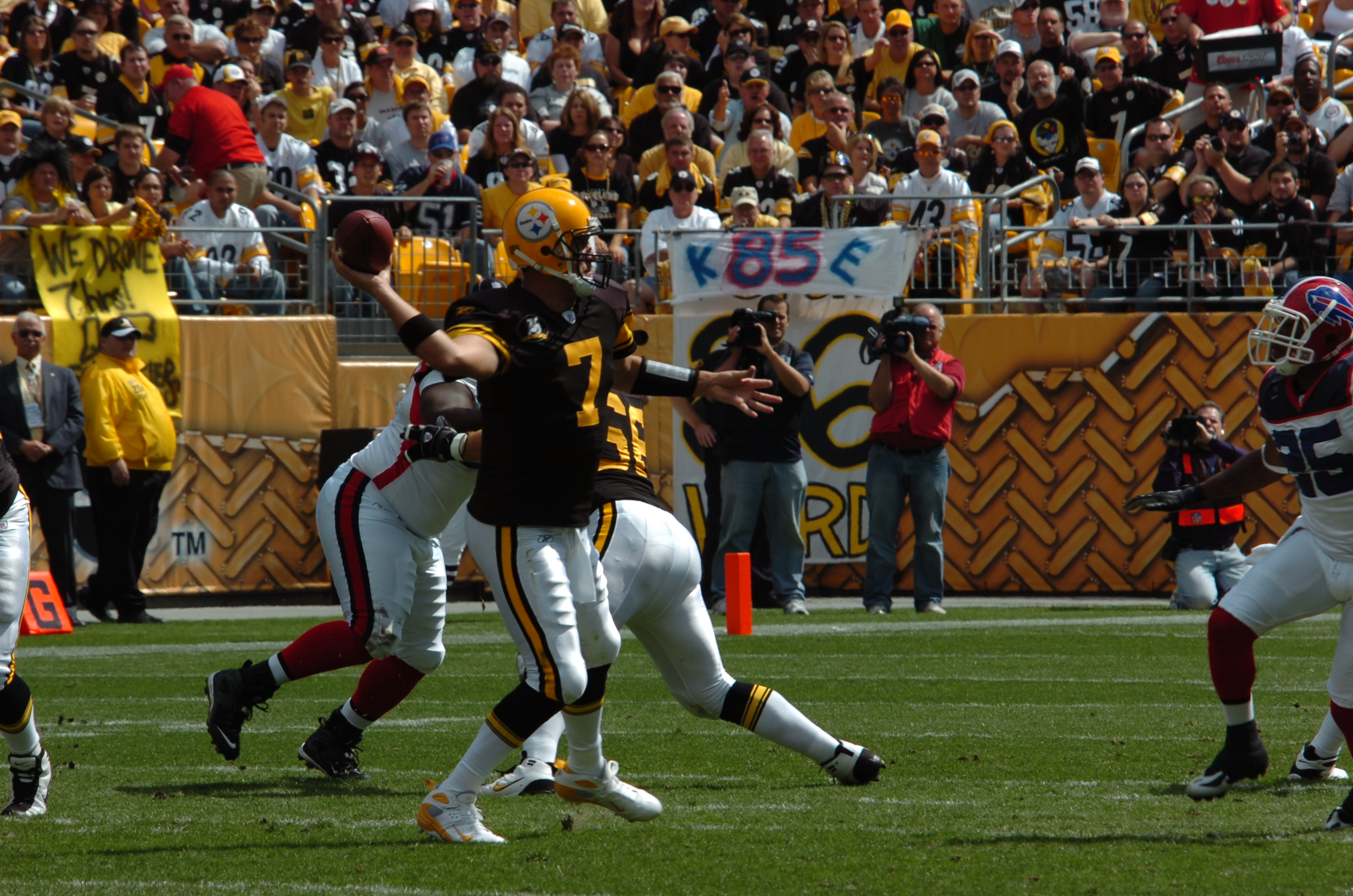
Ben Roethlisberger

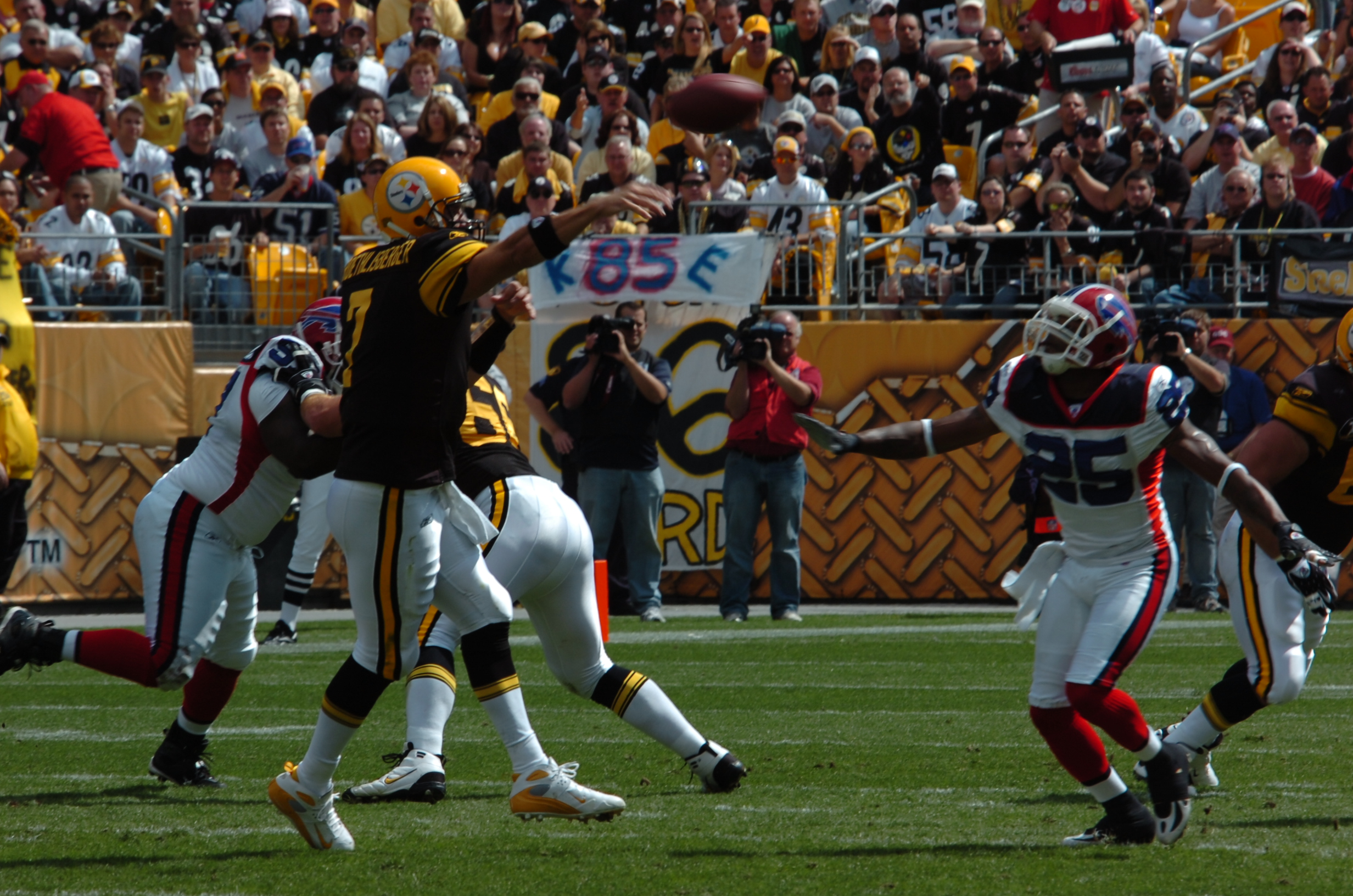
Ben Roethlisberger

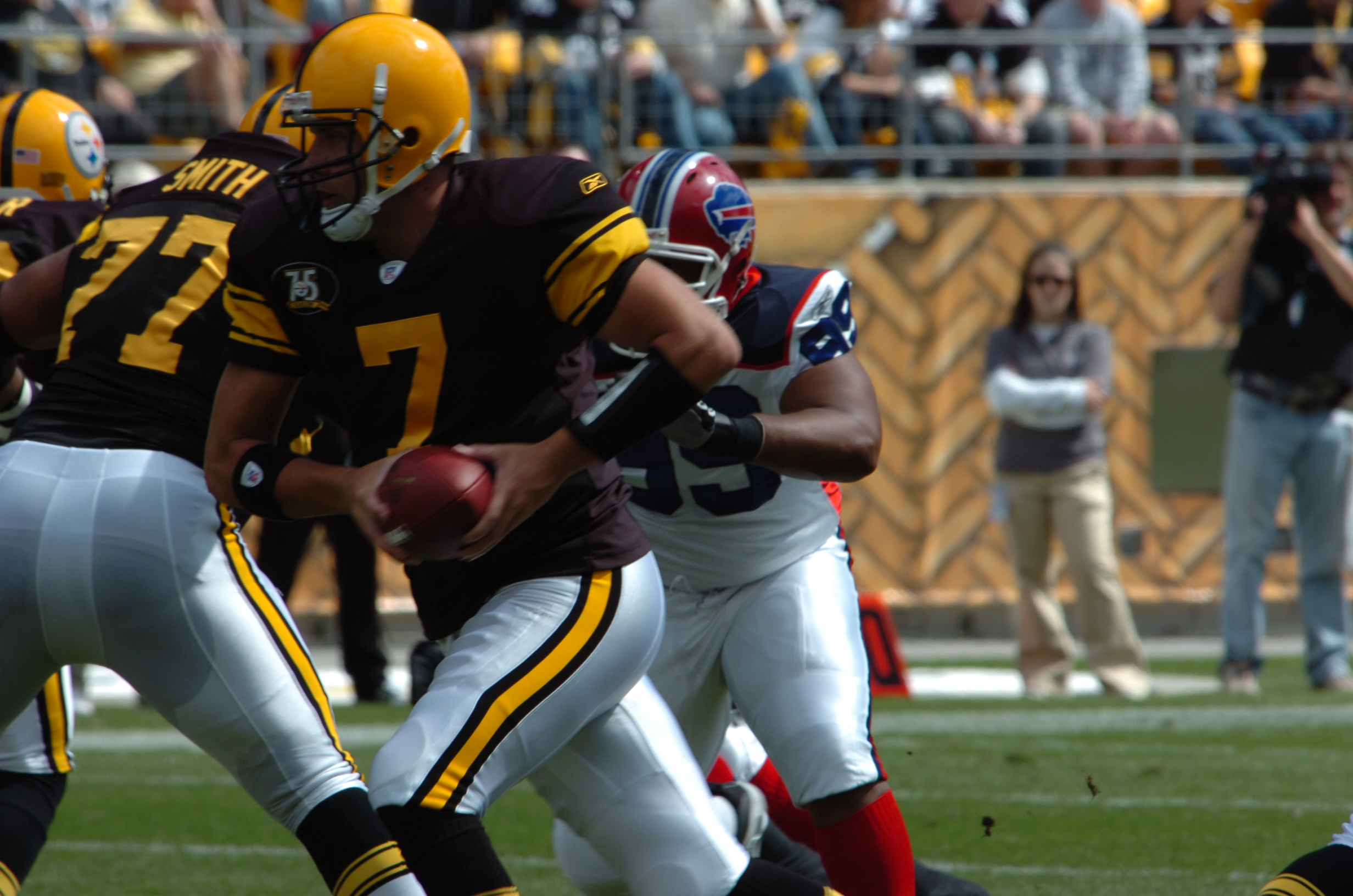
Ben Roethlisberger

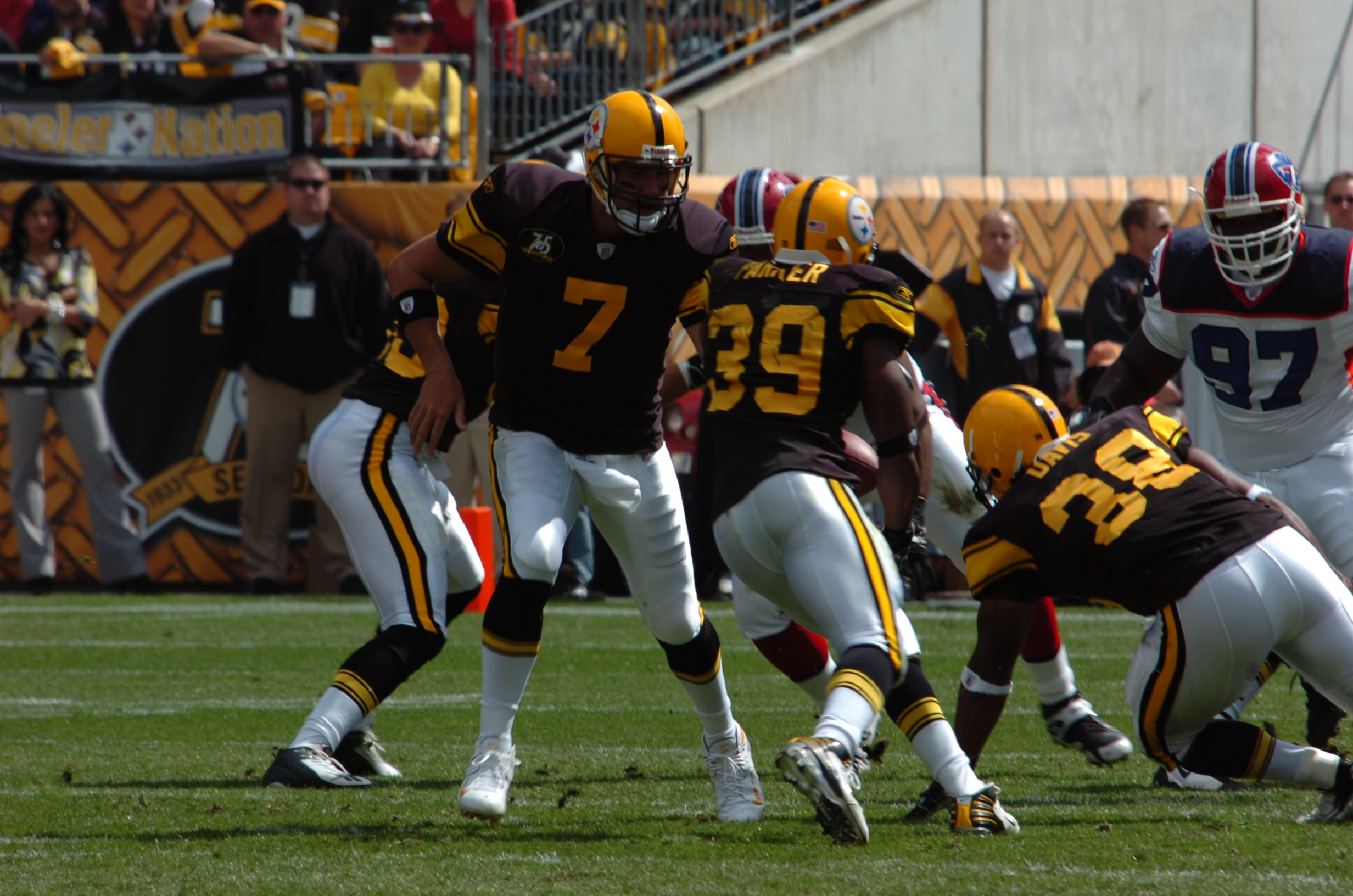
Handoff to Parker

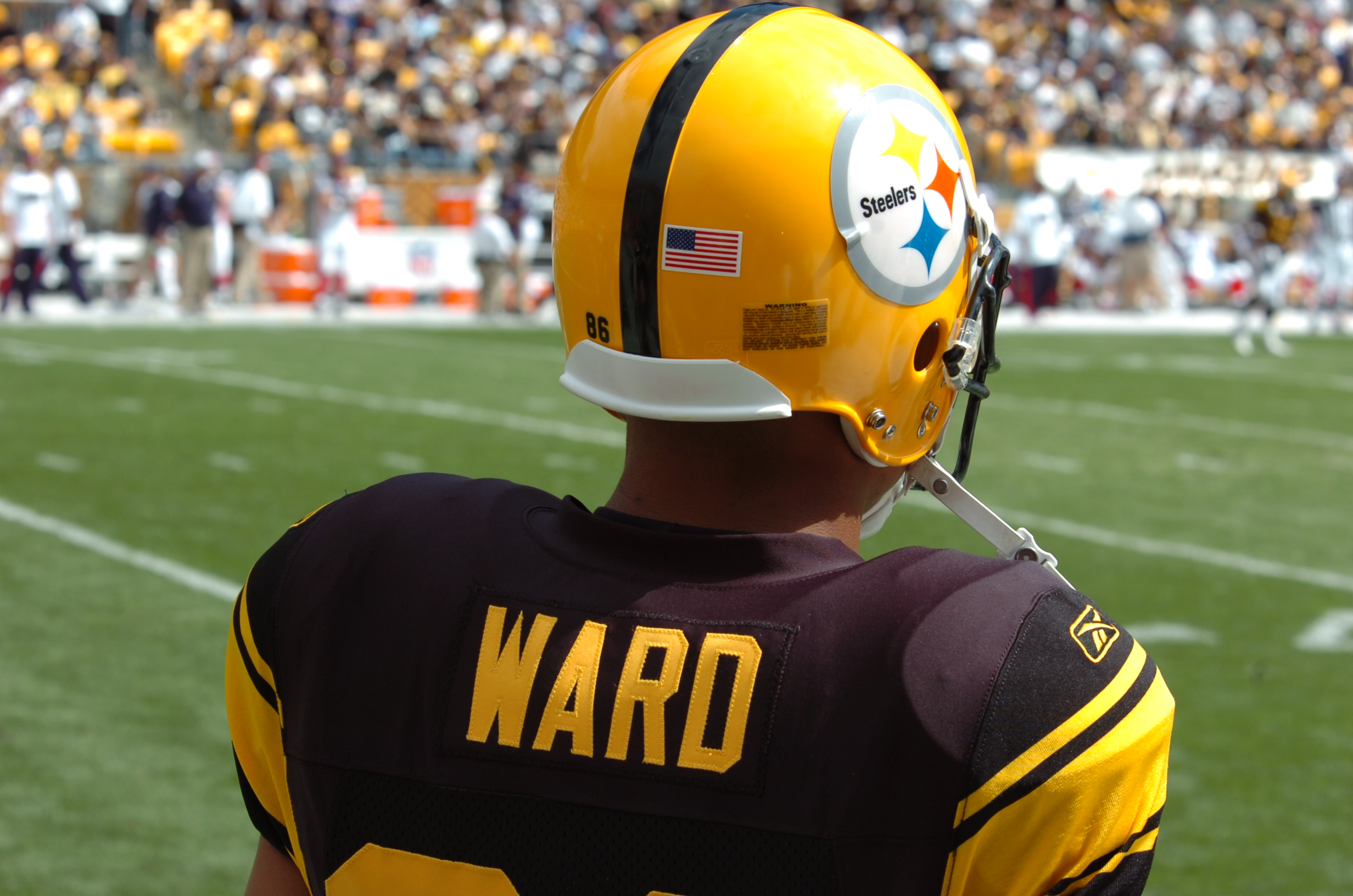
Hines Ward

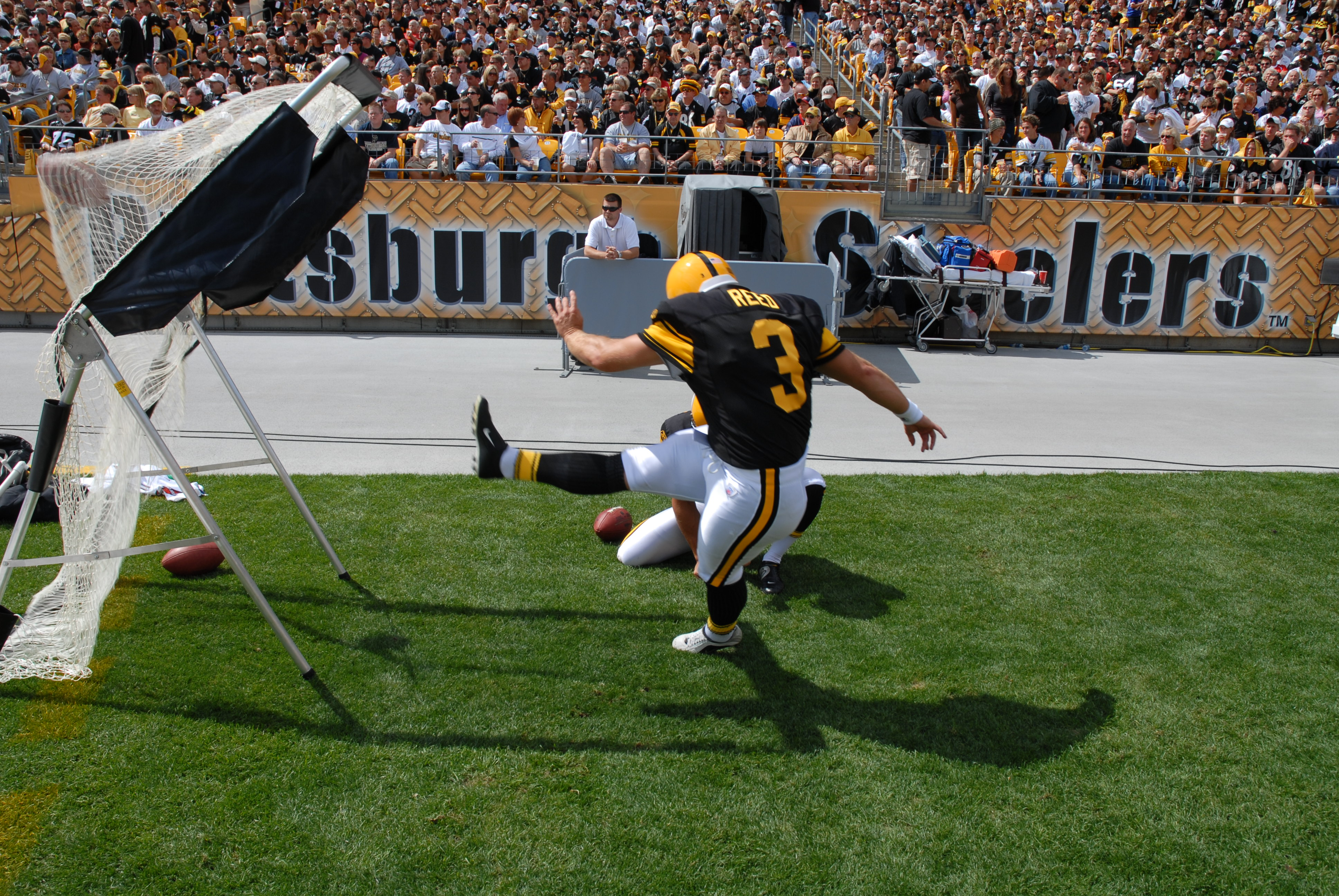
Jeff Reed

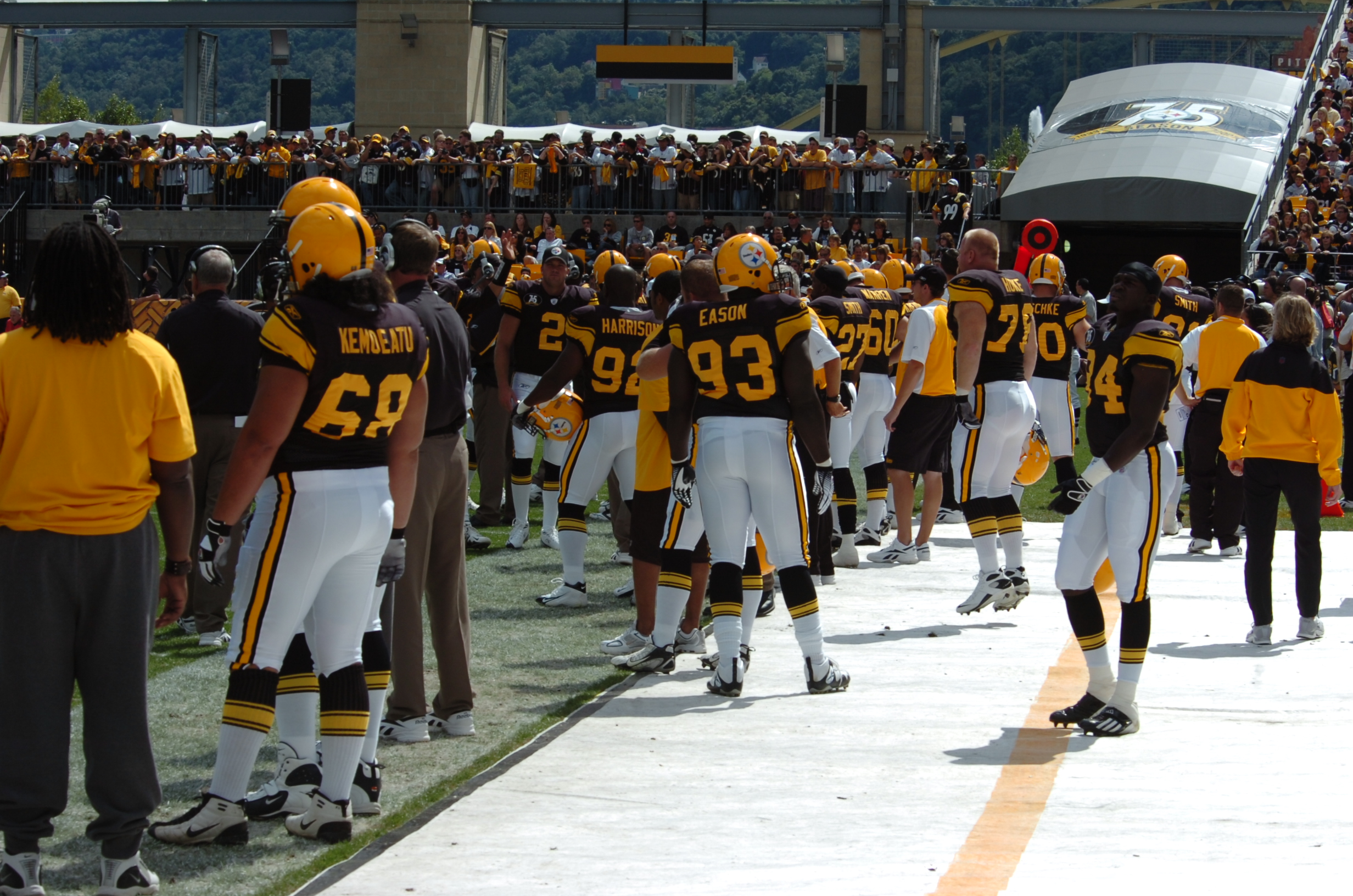
Steeler sideline

=== Week 3 (Sunday September 23, 2007): vs. San Francisco 49ers ===
Quarter	1	2	3	4	Total
49ers	6	0	3	7	16
Steelers	7	7	3	20	37

at Heinz Field, Pittsburgh, Pennsylvania

- Game time: 1:00 p.m. EDT
- Game weather: 72 °F (22 °C) (Sunny & Clear)
- Game attendance: 64,313
- Referee: Gerry Austin
- TV announcers (Fox): Kenny Albert (play by play), Daryl Johnston (color commentator), Tony Siragusa (sideline reporter)

In Week 3 against the San Francisco 49ers, the Steelers found themselves trailing for the first time on the young season as the 49ers drove deep into Pittsburgh territory before being forced to settle for a 32-yard field goal by Joe Nedney. The San Francisco lead lasted exactly 12 seconds, as Allen Rossum returned to ensuing kickoff for a touchdown to give Pittsburgh a 7–3 advantage. The Niners went 3-and-out on their next drive, but they sacked Steelers quarterback Ben Roethlisberger and forced him to fumble on the Steelers' second offensive play from scrimmage. San Francisco recovered the fumble at the Pittsburgh 22 and drove to the 4, but was held to another Nedney field goal, this one from 22 yards out, to cut the Steelers' lead to 1. The teams exchanged punts until late in the second quarter, when Pittsburgh drove 80 yards on 12 plays which culminated in a Roethlisberger touchdown pass to Jerame Tuman to give the Steelers a 14–6 lead into the half.

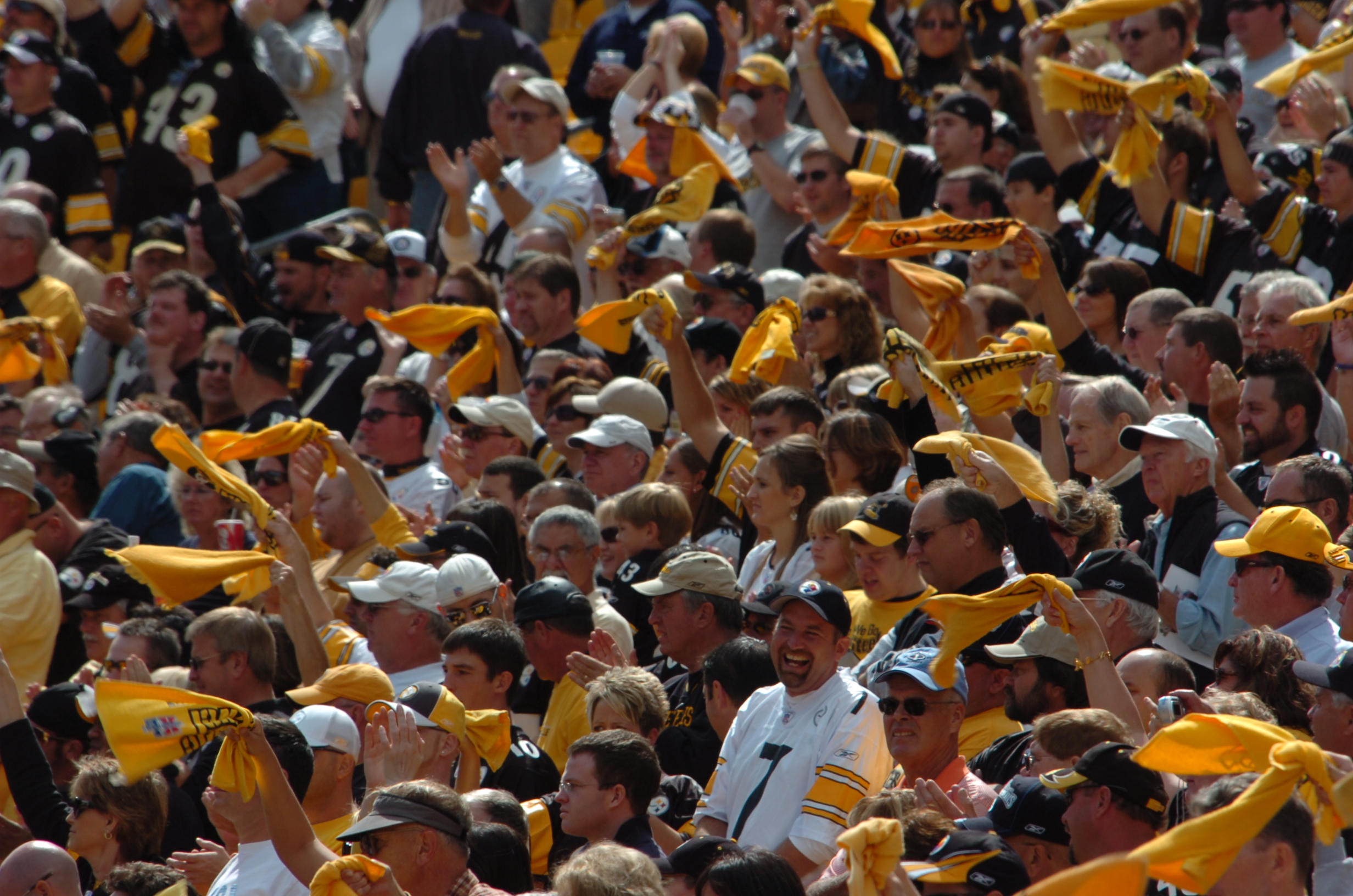
Steelers home fans in the 2007 season

Pittsburgh took the ball to begin the second half, and drove to the San Francisco 18 before being stopped (a catch by Heath Miller at the 49ers 2 yard line was overturned after a successful challenge by San Francisco head coach Mike Nolan showed that Miller was out of bounds). The Steelers were forced to settle for a 36-yard field goal by Jeff Reed to increase their lead to 17–6. On the 49ers' ensuing drive, Alex Smith hit leaping tight end Vernon Davis at the Pittsburgh 5 yard line when he was hit by strong safety Troy Polamalu and flipped into the air. Davis hit the ground, and the ball popped up and was caught by free safety Ryan Clark, who returned it into San Francisco territory. Nolan challenged the play, arguing that Davis was down by contact at the Pittsburgh 5. Referee Gerry Austin ruled instead that the ball had hit the ground, and that the pass was therefore incomplete (the Niners still won the challenge, as the original call of an interception was overturned). The 49ers could not drive any further, and Nedney kicked a 49-yard field goal to make it 17–9, Pittsburgh. The Steelers got the ball back after the field goal and drove deep into 49ers territory before Reed kicked a 49-yard field goal on the first play of the fourth quarter to give the Steelers a 20–9 lead. The 49ers' next drive resulted in a punt, and the Steelers drove into field goal range again. Reed's 35-yard kick was good, and the Steelers led 23–9. On the ensuing possession by San Francisco was facing a crucial 3rd and 5 from their own 42. Smith forced a throw into coverage, and it was intercepted by Steeler cornerback Bryant McFadden and returned for a touchdown to give Pittsburgh a commanding 30–9 lead. Smith drove the 49ers down the field on their next possession, and he threw a 21-yard touchdown pass to Taylor Jacobs to give San Francisco its first and only touchdown of the day. The 49ers tried to execute an onside kick, but Nedney's kick was recovered by Steeler punter Daniel Sepulveda. The Steelers then attempted to run out the clock by handing the ball off to backup running back Najeh Davenport, but Davenport broke a 39-yard touchdown run with under 2 minutes to go to give the Steelers a 37–16 lead, which would be the final score. The Niners attempted one last drive, but could not even gain a first down.

With the win Pittsburgh became one of five NFL teams to increase its record to 3–0, while San Francisco dropped to 2–1. Pittsburgh quarterback Ben Roethlisberger was 13 of 20 for 160 yards with a touchdown and a lost fumble, while Alex Smith was 17 of 35 for 209 yards with a touchdown and an interception. Both were sacked twice. Willie Parker ran for 133 yards on 24 carries, while Frank Gore was held to 39 yards on 14 carries.

=== Week 4 (Sunday September 30, 2007): at Arizona Cardinals ===
Quarter	1	2	3	4	Total
Steelers	7	0	0	7	14
Cardinals	0	0	7	14	21

at University of Phoenix Stadium, Glendale, Arizona

- Game time: 4:15 p.m. EDT
- Game weather: 93 °F (34 °C) (Sunny) (game played with dome closed)
- Game attendance: 64,844
- Referee: Gene Steratore
- TV announcers (CBS): Greg Gumbel (play by play), Dan Dierdorf (color commentator)

Coming off their interconference home win over the 49ers, the Steelers flew to University of Phoenix Stadium for an interconference duel with the Arizona Cardinals, in what turned out to be a preview of next year's Super Bowl. Near the end of the first quarter, Pittsburgh delivered the first punch as QB Ben Roethlisberger completed a 43-yard TD pass to WR Santonio Holmes for the only score of the period. However, after a scoreless second quarter, the Cardinals responded with back-up QB Kurt Warner completing a 6-yard TD pass to WR Jerheme Urban for the only score of the period. In the fourth quarter, things went wrong for the Steelers as Arizona took the lead with WR Steve Breaston returning a punt 73 yards for a touchdown, while RB Edgerrin James got a 2-yard TD run. Pittsburgh tried to mount a comeback as Roethlisberger and Holmes hooked up with each other again on a 7-yard TD pass. However, the Steelers' final drive ended with an interception.

With the loss, Pittsburgh fell to 3–1.

=== Week 5 (Sunday October 7, 2007): vs. Seattle Seahawks ===
Quarter	1	2	3	4	Total
Seahawks	0	0	0	0	0
Steelers	0	7	7	7	21

at Heinz Field, Pittsburgh, Pennsylvania

- Game time: 1:00 p.m. EDT
- Game weather: 84 °F (29 °C) (Sunny)
- Game attendance: 64,478
- Referee: Terry McAulay
- TV announcers (Fox): Joe Buck (play by play), Troy Aikman (color commentator), Pam Oliver (sideline reporter)

Trying to rebound from their road loss to the Cardinals, the Steelers went home for a Week 5 interconference duel with the Seattle Seahawks, in the rematch of Super Bowl XL. Going into the game, Pittsburgh was without Hines Ward, Santonio Holmes, Troy Polamalu, and Casey Hampton, due to injuries.

After a scoreless first quarter, the Steelers drew first blood with QB Ben Roethlisberger completing a 13-yard TD pass to TE Heath Miller to lead 7–0 at halftime. In the second half, Pittsburgh completed the shutout with RB Najeh Davenport running 1 yard for a TD in the third quarter and 5 yards for a TD in the fourth.

With the win, Pittsburgh entered its bye week at 4–1. During the game, the Steelers had over 40 minutes of possession, including 25 minutes of the second half. In their first five games Pittsburgh had outscored its opponents 57–6 in the first half. The Steelers also improved to 4–0 on the year when RB Willie Parker has a 100-yard rushing game, as he ran 28 times for 102 yards.

=== Week 6 (Sunday October 14, 2007): Bye Week ===
The Steelers did not take part in any trades or acquisitions during their bye week. They were able to give their injured players an extra week to heal as Hines Ward, Santonio Holmes, Troy Polamalu, and Casey Hampton were all sidelined due to injuries.

=== Week 7 (Sunday October 21, 2007): at Denver Broncos ===
Quarter	1	2	3	4	Total
Steelers	7	0	7	14	28
Broncos	7	14	7	3	31

at INVESCO Field at Mile High, Denver, Colorado

- Game time: 8:15 p.m. EDT (Sunday Night Football)
- Game weather: 37 °F (3 °C) (Partly Cloudy)
- Game attendance: 77,038
- Referee: Bill Carollo
- TV announcers (NBC): Al Michaels (play by play), John Madden (color commentator), Andrea Kremer (sideline reporter)

Coming off of a bye week, the Steelers flew to INVESCO Field at Mile High for a Sunday night intraconference clash with the Denver Broncos. In the first quarter, Pittsburgh struck first with QB Ben Roethlisberger completing a 1-yard TD pass to TE Heath Miller. Afterwards, the Broncos responded with QB Jay Cutler completing a 15-yard TD pass to WR Brandon Stokley. In the second quarter, the Steelers struggled as Cutler completed a 1-yard TD pass to FB Cecil Sapp, along with DE Tim Crowder returning a fumble 50 yards for a touchdown.

In the third quarter, Pittsburgh tried to recover with Roethlisberger completing a 13-yard TD pass to WR Santonio Holmes, but the Broncos answered with Cutler completing a 1-yard TD pass to TE Tony Scheffler. In the fourth quarter, Pittsburgh managed to tie the game with Roethlisberger completing a 13-yard TD pass to rookie TE Matt Spaeth, along with a 12-yard TD pass to Miller. Unfortunately, Denver managed to get kicker Jason Elam to nail a last-second 49-yard field goal.

With the loss, the Steelers fell to 4–2.

Pittsburgh's defense, which had given up only 5 touchdowns in their first 5 games, gave up 3 on the night.

=== Week 8 (Sunday October 28, 2007): at Cincinnati Bengals ===
Quarter	1	2	3	4	Total
Steelers	7	14	0	3	24
Bengals	3	3	0	7	13

at Paul Brown Stadium, Cincinnati

- Game time: 1:00 p.m. EDT
- Game weather: 52 °F (11 °C) (Sunny)
- Game attendance: 66,188
- Referee: Walt Coleman
- TV announcers (CBS): Dick Enberg (play by play), Randy Cross (color commentator)

Trying to rebound from their last-second road loss to the Broncos, the Steelers flew to Paul Brown Stadium for a Week 8 AFC North brawl with the Cincinnati Bengals. In the first quarter, Pittsburgh trailed early as Bengals kicker Shayne Graham managed to get a 31-yard field goal. Fortunately, the Steelers took the lead with QB Ben Roethlisberger completing a 21-yard TD pass to WR Hines Ward. In the second quarter, Pittsburgh increased its lead with Roethlisberger and Ward hooking up with each other again on a 6-yard TD pass to lead 14–3. With 2:16 left in the second quarter on 4th-and-1 at the Steelers 2, Cincinnati chose to kick a 20-yard field goal and received loud boos from the hometown crowd upon successfully doing so. In a similar situation two minutes later, Steelers RB Willie Parker ran 1 yard into the end zone to put the Steelers up 21–6 at the end of the first half.

After a scoreless third quarter, the Bengals tried to make a fourth quarter comeback as QB Carson Palmer completed a 9-yard TD pass to WR T. J. Houshmandzadeh. Pittsburgh wrapped up the victory with kicker Jeff Reed nailing a 40-yard field goal.

With the win, the Steelers improved to 5–2.

=== Week 9 (Monday November 5, 2007): vs. Baltimore Ravens ===
Quarter	1	2	3	4	Total
Ravens	0	7	0	0	7
Steelers	14	21	3	0	38

at Heinz Field, Pittsburgh, Pennsylvania

- Game time: 8:30 p.m. EST (Monday Night Football)
- Game weather: 51 °F (11 °C) (Rain)
- Game attendance: 63,457
- Referee: Ed Hochuli
- TV announcers (ESPN): Mike Tirico (play by play), Ron Jaworski & Tony Kornheiser (color commentators), Suzy Kolber & Michele Tafoya (sideline reporters)

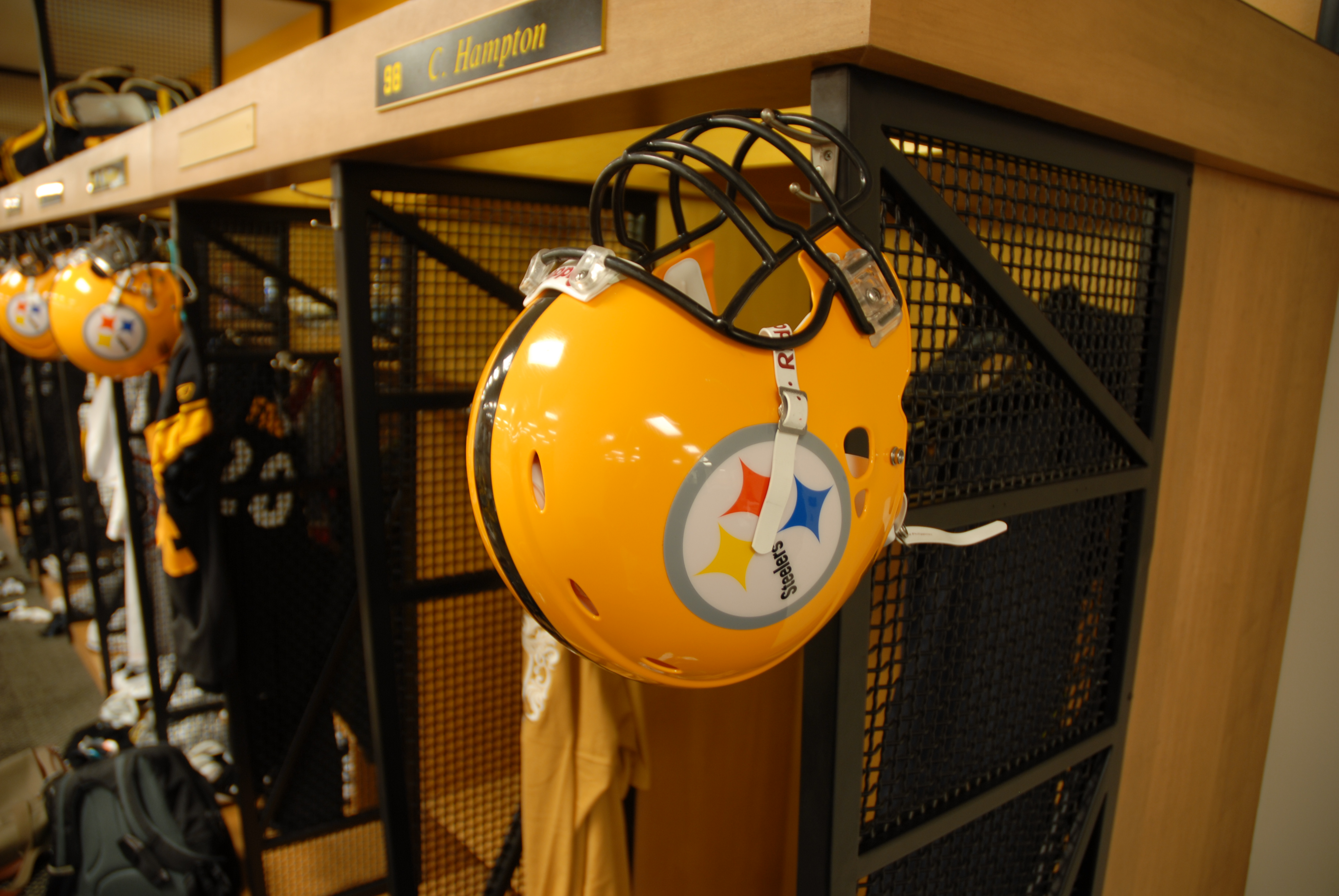
The Steelers' throwback yellow helmet worn in week 2 and 9 of the season

Coming off their divisional road win over the Bengals, the Steelers went home, donned their throwback uniforms again, and played a Week 9 Monday Night divisional duel with the Baltimore Ravens. In the first quarter, Pittsburgh came out strong as QB Ben Roethlisberger completed a 17-yard TD pass to TE Heath Miller and a 15-yard TD pass to WR Santonio Holmes. In the second quarter, the Steelers increased their lead with Roethlisberger completing a 30-yard TD pass to WR Nate Washington, a 35-yard TD pass to Holmes, and a 7-yard TD pass to Washington. Afterwards, the Ravens managed to avoid a shutout as RB Willis McGahee got a 33-yard TD run. In the third quarter, Pittsburgh increased its lead with kicker Jeff Reed nailing a 22-yard field goal, while the defense continued to shut down Baltimore's offense.

With the win, their 12th straight in Monday Night Football home games, the Steelers improved to 6–2.

Ben Roethlisberger had a career game as he completed 13 of 16 passes for 209 yards and a career-high 5 touchdowns for his second career "perfect game." LB James Harrison had a career day with three forced fumbles, a fumble recovery, an interception, and 3½ sacks.

During halftime, the Steelers honored their All-Time team. Members included Joe Greene, Terry Bradshaw, Franco Harris, Jerome Bettis, Rod Woodson, John Stallworth, Lynn Swann, and Mel Blount.

=== Week 10 (Sunday November 11, 2007): vs. Cleveland Browns ===
Quarter	1	2	3	4	Total
Browns	7	14	0	7	28
Steelers	3	6	7	15	31

at Heinz Field, Pittsburgh, Pennsylvania

- Game time: 1:00 p.m. EST
- Game weather: 40 °F (4 °C) (Cloudy)
- Game attendance: 64,781
- Referee: Ron Winter
- TV announcers (CBS): Jim Nantz (play by play), Phil Simms (color commentator)

Coming off their dominating Monday Night performance against the Ravens, the Steelers stayed at home for Round 2 of the 2007 Rust Belt series against the Cleveland Browns. In the first quarter, Pittsburgh trailed early as Browns QB Derek Anderson completed a 4-yard TD pass to TE Kellen Winslow. The Steelers managed to get a 28-yard field goal from kicker Jeff Reed. In the second quarter, Cleveland increased its lead with Anderson completing a 2-yard TD pass to FB Lawrence Vickers, while Pittsburgh only managed to have Reed kick a 35-yard field goal. Afterwards, the Browns continued their fast start with Anderson completing a 16-yard TD pass to WR Braylon Edwards. The Steelers drove into the red zone once again but settled for a 30-yard field goal from Reed. Both teams scored thrice in the first half; Cleveland led 21–9.

In the third quarter, Pittsburgh began to come back as QB Ben Roethlisberger completed a 12-yard TD pass to WR Hines Ward for the only score of the period. In the fourth quarter, the Steelers took the lead with Roethlisberger getting a career-best 30-yard TD run. Cleveland WR/KR Joshua Cribbs returned the ensuing kickoff 100 yards for a touchdown. Pittsburgh on their next drive retook the lead with Roethlisberger completing a 2-yard TD pass to TE Heath Miller. The Browns tried to force overtime with a late field goal, but kicker Phil Dawson's 53-yard attempt came up short with 6 seconds left.

With their ninth straight win over Cleveland, the Steelers improved to 7–2 increasing the all-time series to 57–55.

=== Week 11 (Sunday November 18, 2007): at New York Jets ===
Quarter	1	2	3	4	OT	Total
Steelers	0	7	6	3	0	16
Jets	10	3	0	3	3	19

at Giants Stadium, East Rutherford, New Jersey

- Game time: 4:05 p.m. EST
- Game weather: 43 °F (6 °C) (Cloudy)
- Game attendance: 77,659
- Referee: Scott Green
- TV announcers (CBS): Jim Nantz (play by play), Phil Simms (color commentator)

Coming off their season-sweep over the Browns, the Steelers flew to The Meadowlands for a Week 11 intraconference duel with the New York Jets. In the first quarter, Pittsburgh surprisingly fell behind early as Jets QB Kellen Clemens completed a 1-yard TD pass to TE Chris Baker, along with kicker Mike Nugent getting a 25-yard field goal. In the second quarter, the Steelers got on the board with QB Ben Roethlisberger completing a 7-yard TD pass to WR Santonio Holmes. New York would end the half with Nugent kicking a 19-yard field goal.

In the third quarter, Pittsburgh tied the game with kicker Jeff Reed getting a 37-yard and a 33-yard field goal. In the fourth quarter, the Steelers took the lead with Reed getting a 48-yard field goal. However, the Jets managed to tie the game with Nugent kicking a 28-yard field goal. In overtime, New York managed to pull off the upset as Nugent nailed the game-winning 38-yard field goal.

With the surprising loss, Pittsburgh fell to 7–3.

Even worse, the Steelers highly ranked rushing defense allowed its first 100-yard rusher since 2005 (Edgerrin James of the Colts) as RB Thomas Jones got 30 carries for 117 yards.

=== Week 12 (Monday November 26, 2007): vs. Miami Dolphins ===
Quarter	1	2	3	4	Total
Dolphins	0	0	0	0	0
Steelers	0	0	0	3	3

at Heinz Field, Pittsburgh, Pennsylvania

- Game time: 8:30 p.m. EST (Monday Night Football) (Delayed Until 8:55 p.m., Thunderstorms)
- Game weather: 52 °F (11 °C) (Rain/Thunderstorms)
- Game attendance: 57,704
- Referee: Jeff Triplette
- TV announcers (ESPN): Mike Tirico (play by play), Ron Jaworski & Tony Kornheiser (color commentators), Suzy Kolber & Michele Tafoya (sideline reporters)

Game information

First quarter

- No scoring plays

Second quarter

- No scoring plays

Third quarter

- No scoring plays

Fourth quarter

- PIT – Jeff Reed 24-yard field goal, 0:17. Steelers 3–0. Drive: 9 plays, 36 yards, 3:56.

Top passers

- MIA – John Beck – 14/23, 132 yards
- PIT – Ben Roethlisberger – 18/21, 165 yards, INT

Top rushers

- MIA – Jesse Chatman – 11 rushes, 17 yards
- PIT – Willie Parker – 24 rushes, 84 yards

Top receivers

- MIA – Marty Booker – 5 receptions, 54 yards
- PIT – Hines Ward – 9 receptions, 88 yards

Coming off their disappointing loss to the Jets, the Steelers went home for a Week 12 Monday Night intraconference duel with the winless Miami Dolphins.

Playing in heavy rain with a delay due to lightning, the game remained scoreless through 59 minutes and 43 seconds, becoming the longest scoreless tie since November 7, 1943. In the end, Pittsburgh came through with kicker Jeff Reed nailing the game-winning 24-yard field goal with 17 seconds left for the game's lone points.

With the win, the Steelers improved to 8–3. Also, not only did they improve their home record to 6–0, but this also marked their 13th-straight home win on Monday Night Football. This game would also be crowned as the lowest-scoring game in Monday Night Football history. It was the lowest scoring NFL game since December 11, 1993, when the New York Jets defeated Washington by the same score.

=== Week 13 (Sunday December 2, 2007): vs. Cincinnati Bengals ===
Quarter	1	2	3	4	Total
Bengals	7	0	3	0	10
Steelers	0	17	7	0	24

at Heinz Field, Pittsburgh, Pennsylvania

- Game time: 8:15 p.m. EST (Sunday Night Football)
- Game weather: 48 °F (9 °C) (Light Rain)
- Game attendance: 58,842
- Referee: Bill Carollo
- TV announcers (NBC): Al Michaels (play by play), John Madden (color commentator), Andrea Kremer (sideline reporter)

Coming off their Monday Night slushfest victory over the Dolphins, the Steelers stayed at home for a Week 13 Sunday night divisional rematch with the Cincinnati Bengals. In the first quarter, Pittsburgh trailed early as Bengals RB Rudi Johnson got a 1-yard TD run for the only score of the period. In the second quarter, the Steelers took the lead with QB Ben Roethlisberger getting a 6-yard TD run, kicker Jeff Reed getting a 21-yard field goal, and Roethlisberger completing a 2-yard TD pass to WR Hines Ward. In the third quarter, Cincinnati tried to fight back as kicker Shayne Graham nailed a 24-yard field goal. However, Pittsburgh responded with Roethlisberger and Ward hooking up with each other again on an 8-yard TD pass.

With the win, the Steelers improved to 9–3, along with improving this year's home record to 7–0. It also marked the first time since 2004 that Pittsburgh managed to sweep the Bengals.

With his two touchdown receptions, Hines Ward surpassed John Stallworth for the most career touchdown receptions in franchise history with 64.

=== Week 14 (Sunday December 9, 2007): at New England Patriots ===
Quarter	1	2	3	4	Total
Steelers	3	10	0	0	13
Patriots	7	10	14	3	34

at Gillette Stadium, Foxborough, Massachusetts

- Game time: 4:15 p.m. EST
- Game weather: 34 °F (1 °C) (Cloudy)
- Game attendance: 68,756
- Referee: Terry McAulay
- TV announcers (CBS): Jim Nantz (play by play), Phil Simms (color commentator)

Coming off their Sunday Night divisional home win over the Bengals, the Steelers flew to Gillette Stadium for a Week 14 intraconference duel with the undefeated New England Patriots. In the first quarter, Pittsburgh struck first with kicker Jeff Reed getting a 23-yard field goal. Afterwards, the Patriots took the lead with QB Tom Brady completing a 4-yard TD pass to WR Randy Moss. In the second quarter, New England increased their lead with Brady and Moss hooking up with each other again on a 63-yard TD pass. Afterwards, the Steelers responded with QB Ben Roethlisberger completing a 32-yard TD pass to RB Najeh Davenport, along with Reed kicking a 44-yard field goal. New England would end the half with kicker Stephen Gostkowski getting a 42-yard field goal.

In the third quarter, the Patriots took control as Brady lateraled to Moss, who lateraled back to Brady, and then threw a 56-yard TD pass to WR Jabar Gaffney. Afterwards, New England increased its lead with Brady completing a 2-yard TD pass to WR Wes Welker. In the fourth quarter, the Patriots sealed the win with Gostkowski nailing a 28-yard field goal.

With the loss, Pittsburgh fell to 9–4.

The loss also made the Steelers' road record fall to 2–4.

=== Week 15 (Sunday December 16, 2007): vs. Jacksonville Jaguars ===
Quarter	1	2	3	4	Total
Jaguars	3	7	12	7	29
Steelers	0	7	0	15	22

at Heinz Field, Pittsburgh, Pennsylvania

- Game time: 1:00 p.m. EST
- Game weather: 32 °F (0 °C) (Flurries)
- Game attendance: 58,793
- Referee: Gene Steratore
- TV announcers (CBS): Greg Gumbel (play by play) & Dan Dierdorf (color commentator)

Hoping to rebound from their road loss to the Patriots, the Steelers went home for a Week 15 duel with the Jacksonville Jaguars. In the first quarter, Pittsburgh trailed early as Jaguars kicker Josh Scobee nailed a 36-yard field goal. In the second quarter, the Steelers took the lead as QB Ben Roethlisberger completed an 18-yard TD pass to TE Heath Miller. Jacksonville regained the lead as QB David Garrard completed a 12-yard TD pass to WR Ernest Wilford.

In the third quarter, Pittsburgh fell further behind as Garrard completed a 3-yard TD pass to WR Reggie Williams and a 55-yard TD pass to WR Dennis Northcutt. The extra point attempts on both of these touchdowns failed. In the fourth quarter, the Steelers rallied to tie the game with Roethlisberger completing an 11-yard TD pass to WR Hines Ward and a 30-yard TD pass to WR Nate Washington, with the later being followed by WR Cedric Wilson completing a 2-point conversion pass to WR Santonio Holmes on a trick play. On the Jaguars' ensuing offensive drive RB Fred Taylor scored on a 12-yard TD run. The Steelers' next drive ended just a half-yard short on a fourth-down conversion attempt with 41 seconds remaining.

With their first home loss of the year, the Steelers fell to 9–5. This was also the second game this year that Pittsburgh's defense had given up a 100-yard rusher: Fred Taylor ran 25 times for 147 yards and a touchdown.

=== Week 16 (Thursday December 20, 2007): at St. Louis Rams ===
Quarter	1	2	3	4	Total
Steelers	7	17	7	10	41
Rams	7	10	7	0	24

at Edward Jones Dome, St. Louis, Missouri

- Game time: 8:15 p.m. EST (Thursday Night Football)
- Game weather: Dome
- Game attendance: 65,705
- Referee: Walt Anderson
- TV announcers (NFL Network): Bryant Gumbel (play by play), Marshall Faulk & Deion Sanders (color commentators)

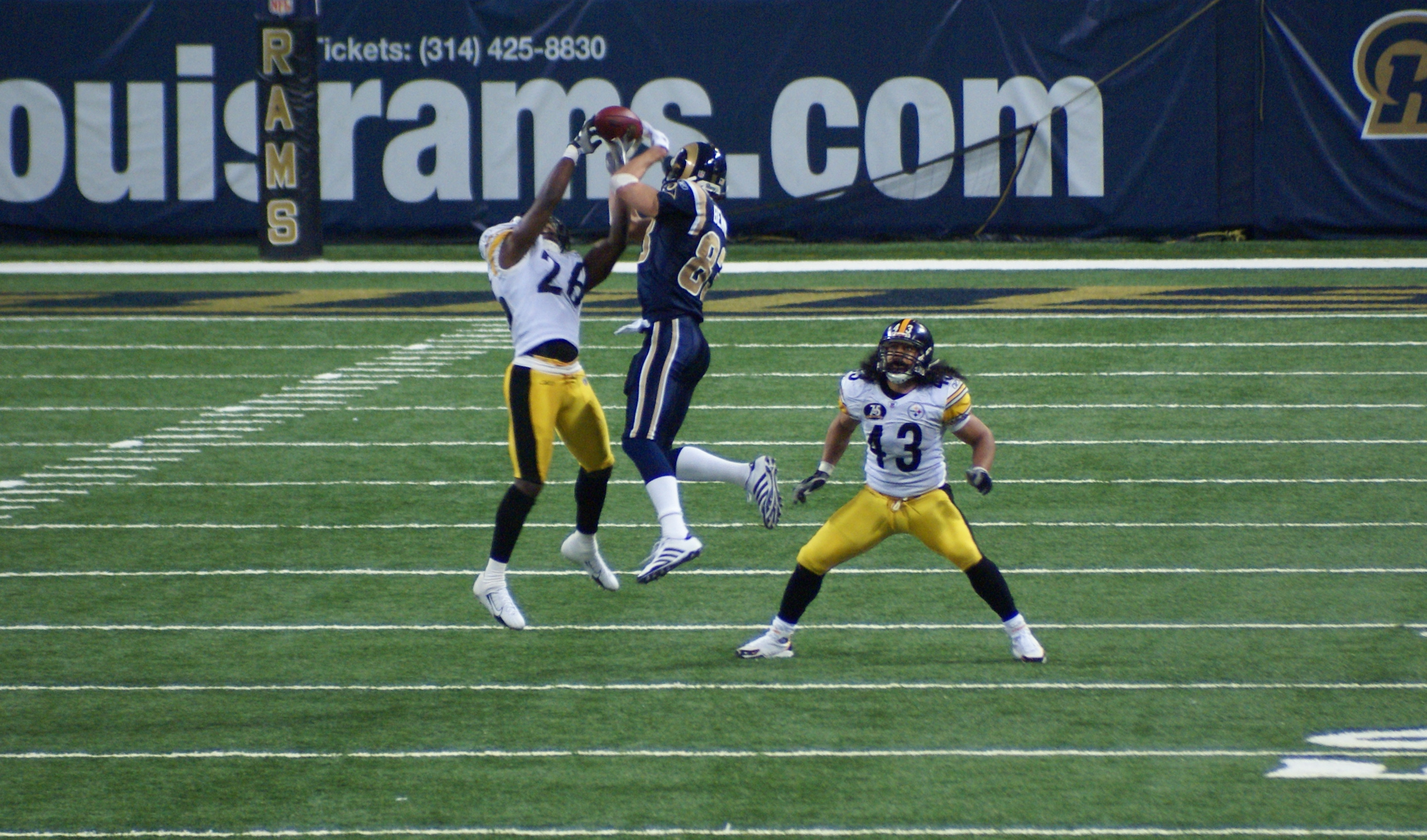
Deshea Townsend jumps against Rams WR Drew Bennett

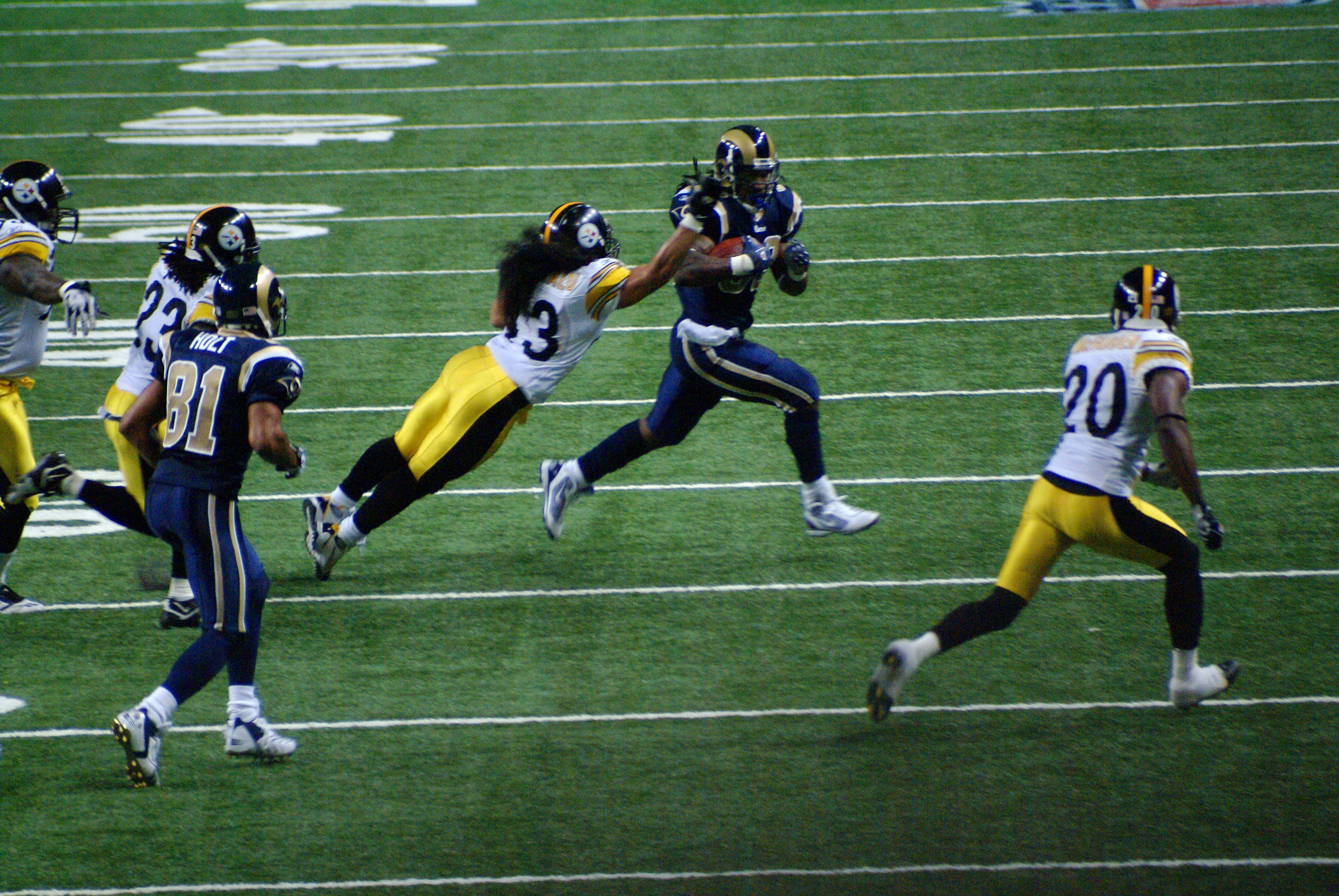
Troy Polamalu tackles

Trying to snap a two-game losing skid, the Steelers flew to the Edward Jones Dome for a Week 16 Thursday night interconference duel with the St. Louis Rams. In the first quarter, Pittsburgh smashed first as QB Ben Roethlisberger completed a 17-yard TD pass to WR Nate Washington. The Rams would respond with QB Marc Bulger completing a 12-yard TD pass to RB Steven Jackson. In the second quarter, the Steelers regained the lead with kicker Jeff Reed getting a 21-yard field goal. However, St. Louis took the lead with Bulger completing a 12-yard TD pass to WR Isaac Bruce. Afterwards, Pittsburgh got the lead again as Roethlisberger completed a 33-yard TD pass to Washington and a 12-yard TD pass to RB Najeh Davenport. The Rams end the half with kicker Jeff Wilkins getting a 52-yard field goal.

In the third quarter, the Steelers increased their lead with Davenport getting a 1-yard TD run. St. Louis would respond with Bulger completing a 23-yard TD pass to WR Drew Bennett. In the fourth quarter, Pittsburgh ended the game with Reed nailing a 29-yard field goal and CB Ike Taylor returning an interception 51 yards for a touchdown.

The Steelers recorded their first road win against the Rams, ending a 10-game road losing streak and an 11-game road winless streak against them (which included a tie in 1939). The Cleveland Browns' loss three days later automatically clinched the Steelers' first AFC North title since 2004.

WR Hines Ward (6 receptions for 59 yards) surpassed John Stallworth as the all-time franchise leader in career reception yards with 8,726 yards. Also, Santonio Holmes got a career-high with his game-best 133 receiving yards on 4 catches. Finally, Ben Roethlisberger got his third career "perfect" game (16/20 for 261 yards and 3 touchdowns).

RB Willie Parker (1 carry for −1 yard) got injured on Pittsburgh's second offensive play of the game after getting tackled by LB Will Witherspoon. He would suffer a fractured right fibula, effectively ending his season.

=== Week 17 (Sunday December 30, 2007): at Baltimore Ravens ===
Quarter	1	2	3	4	Total
Steelers	0	7	0	14	21
Ravens	10	10	7	0	27

at M&T Bank Stadium, Baltimore, Maryland

- Game time: 4:15 p.m. EST
- Game weather: 42 °F (6 °C) (Rain)
- Game attendance: 71,353
- Referee: Gerry Austin
- TV announcers (CBS): Jim Nantz (play by play), Phil Simms (color commentator)

Following their road win over the Rams, the Steelers closed out the regular season with a Week 17 AFC North rematch with the Baltimore Ravens. Because Pittsburgh already clinched a playoff berth (via winning the division), most of their key players sat out the game.

In the first quarter, the Steelers trailed early as Ravens RB Musa Smith got a 2-yard TD run, along with kicker Matt Stover managed to get a 28-yard field goal. In the second quarter, Pittsburgh continued to trail as RB Cory Ross got a 32-yard TD run. The Steelers would respond with RB Najeh Davenport getting a 1-yard TD run. Baltimore would end the half with Stover nailing a 31-yard field goal.

In the third quarter, Baltimore increased its lead with QB Troy Smith completing a 15-TD pass to WR Devard Darling for the only score of the period. In the fourth quarter, Pittsburgh tried to rally as QB Charlie Batch completed a 59-yard TD pass to WR Santonio Holmes and a 7-yard TD pass to WR Cedric Wilson. However, the Ravens managed to hold on for the win.

With the loss, the Steelers ended the regular season at 10–6 and with the AFC's No. 4 seed.

== Playoffs ==
=== Schedule ===
Week	Date	Kickoff (ET)	TV	Opponent	Result	Game Site	NFL Recap
Wild Card	January 5	8:15 p.m.	NBC	Jacksonville Jaguars	L 29–31	Heinz Field	Summary

=== AFC Wild Card Playoff (Saturday January 5, 2008): vs. Jacksonville Jaguars ===
Quarter	1	2	3	4	Total
Jaguars	7	14	7	3	31
Steelers	7	0	3	19	29

at Heinz Field, Pittsburgh

- Game time: 8:15 p.m. EST
- Game weather: 39 °F (4 °C) (Light rain)
- Game attendance: 63,629
- Referee: Scott Green
- TV announcers (NBC): Al Michaels (play by play), John Madden (color commentator), and Andrea Kremer (sideline reporter)

Game information

First quarter

- PIT – Najeh Davenport 1 yd TD run (Jeff Reed kick), 10:03. Steelers 7–0 Drive: 10 plays, 80 yards, 4:57
- JAX – Fred Taylor 1 yd TD run (Josh Scobee kick), 9:39. Tied 7–7 Drive: 1 play, 1 yard, 0:24

Second quarter

- JAX – Rashean Mathis 63 yd interception return TD (Josh Scobee kick), 10:19 Jaguars 14–7
- JAX – Maurice Jones-Drew 43 yd TD pass from David Garrard (Josh Scobee kick), 8:34. Jaguars 21–7 Drive: 3 plays, 46 yards, 0:56

Third quarter

- PIT – Jeff Reed 28 yd field goal, 9:24. Jaguars 21–10 Drive: 8 plays, 33 yards in 4:45
- JAX – Maurice Jones-Drew 10 yd run (Josh Scobee kick), 4:39. Jaguars 28–10 Drive: 8 plays, 82 yards in 4:45

Fourth quarter

- PIT – Santonio Holmes 37 yd pass from Ben Roethlisberger (Jeff Reed kick), 14:53. Jaguars 28–17 Drive: 10 plays, 69 yards in 4:46
- PIT – Heath Miller 14 yd pass from Ben Roethlisberger (2 pt conversion failed), 10:25. Jaguars 28–23 Drive: 10 plays, 69 yards in 3:49
- PIT – Najeh Davenport 1 yd run (2 pt conversion failed), 6:21. Steelers 29–28 Drive: 7 plays, 16 yards in 2:29
- JAX – Josh Scobee 25 yd field goal, 0:37. Jaguars 31–29 Drive: 8 plays, 44 yards in 2:01

Top passers

- JAX – David Garrard – 9/21, 140 yards, TD, INT
- PIT – Ben Roethlisberger – 29/42, 337 yards, 2 TD, 3 INT

Top rushers

- JAX – David Garrard – 5 rushes, 58 yards
- PIT – Najeh Davenport – 16 rushes, 25 yards, 2 TD

Top receivers

- JAX – Maurice Jones-Drew – 1 reception, 43 yards, TD
- PIT – Hines Ward – 10 receptions, 135 yards

==== Game summary ====
Entering the playoffs as the AFC's No. 4 seed, the Steelers began their playoff run at home in the AFC Wildcard Round against the fifth-seeded Jacksonville Jaguars in a rematch of Week 15 where Pittsburgh nearly came back to win.

In the first quarter, the Steelers got the first punch by capping the game's opening drive with RB Najeh Davenport getting a 1-yard TD run. The Jaguars would immediately respond as RB Fred Taylor got a 1-yard TD run following a 96-yard kick-off return by RB Maurice Jones-Drew. In the second quarter, Pittsburgh trailed as CB Rashean Mathis returned an interception 63 yards for a touchdown and QB David Garrard completed a 43-yard TD pass to Jones-Drew.

In the third quarter, Pittsburgh responded with kicker Jeff Reed getting a 28-yard field goal, but Jacksonville responded with Maurice Jones-Drew getting a 10-yard TD run. In the fourth quarter, the Steelers began to come back as QB Ben Roethlisberger completed a 37-yard TD pass to WR Santonio Holmes and a 14-yard TD pass to TE Heath Miller (with the latter having a failed two-point conversion), while Davenport got another 1-yard TD run (with another failed two-point conversion) to take a one-point lead. However, the Jaguars regained the lead with kicker Josh Scobee nailing a 25-yard field goal. Pittsburgh regained the ball afterwards, but Jacksonville immediately forced and recovered the fumble, effectively ending any possibility of a comeback.

With the loss, the Steelers ended their season with an overall record of 10–7. It was guard Alan Faneca's last game as a Steeler.
