= Jeff Reed (American football) =

American football player (born 1979)

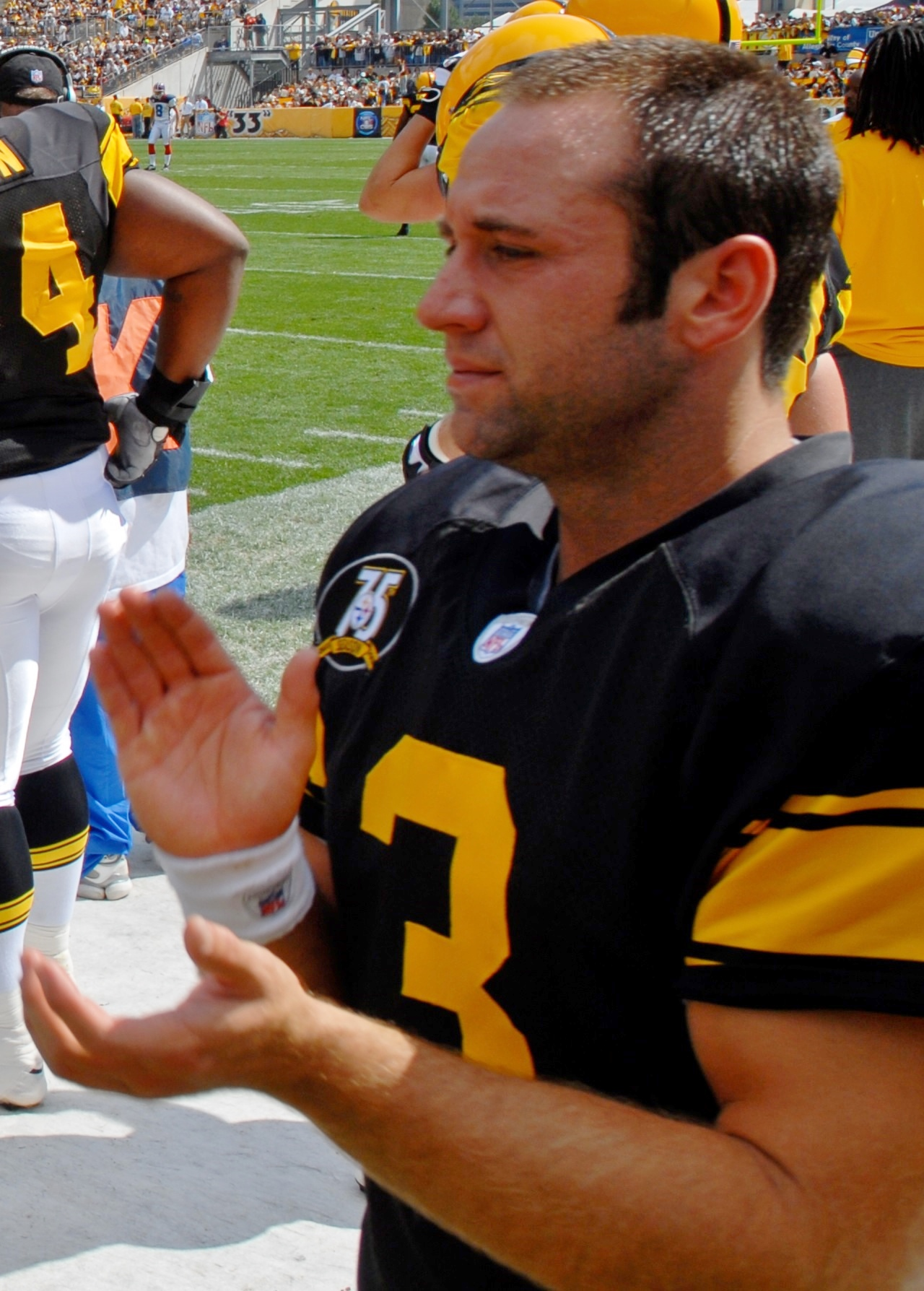
- Reed with the Pittsburgh Steelers in 2007

No. 3
- Position: Placekicker

Personal information
- Born: April 9, 1979 (age 47); Kansas City, Missouri, U.S.
- Listed height: 5 ft 11 in (1.80 m)
- Listed weight: 225 lb (102 kg)

Career information
- High school: East Mecklenburg (Charlotte, North Carolina)
- College: North Carolina (2000–2001)
- NFL draft: 2002: undrafted

Career history
- New Orleans Saints (2002)*; Pittsburgh Steelers (2002–2010); San Francisco 49ers (2010); Seattle Seahawks (2011)*
- * Offseason or practice squad member only

Awards and highlights
- 2× Super Bowl champion (XL, XLIII); Second-team All-ACC (2000)

Career NFL statistics
- Field goals made: 213
- Field goals attempted: 259
- Field goal %: 82.2%
- Longest field goal: 53
- Stats at Pro Football Reference

Jeffrey Montgomery Reed (born April 9, 1979) is an American former professional football player who was a placekicker in the National Football League (NFL). He played college football for the North Carolina Tar Heels. Reed was signed by the New Orleans Saints as an undrafted free agent in 2002. He played for the Pittsburgh Steelers from 2002 until 2010, and is third all-time behind Gary Anderson and Chris Boswell for the most points scored by a Steeler.

He was also a member of the San Francisco 49ers and Seattle Seahawks. However, he never played a single snap for the Seahawks.

== Early life ==
Born in Kansas City, Missouri, Reed graduated from East Mecklenburg High School in Charlotte, North Carolina in 1997. While there, Reed was captain of the soccer team and kicker for the football team. He was a letterman in both sports. His senior year the soccer team went to the state finals but lost, 2–1. During his senior year, Reed kicked a 54-yard field goal, the second longest in North Carolina history, against Providence High School, setting a new school record. In football, he won All-Conference and All-County honors.

Reed was involved in the school newspaper, National Honor Society, and the Spanish National Honor Society. He graduated 9th in his class out of 365.

In the Spring 2005, Reed was added to the East Mecklenburg Wall of Fame.

== College career ==
Reed attended the University of North Carolina at Chapel Hill where he majored in journalism and played college football. He had never kicked in a college game until the 2000 season, but he emerged as one of the most consistent kickers (and punter) in the country. He was an honorable mention All-ACC pick as a senior and a second-team All-ACC player as a junior. He entered the 2000 season as a walk-on, but he earned a scholarship after connecting on 28-of-36 field goal attempts and 66-of-67 extra points. His 66 consecutive PATs set a UNC record. He was one of 20 semifinalists for the Lou Groza Award, which is given annually to the nation's top kicker. Reed was first-team Academic All-ACC.

While at UNC, Reed was teammates with running back Willie Parker, his future teammate with the Pittsburgh Steelers.

== Professional career ==
=== New Orleans Saints ===
After going undrafted in the 2002 NFL draft, Reed signed with the New Orleans Saints on April 26, 2002. He was waived on August 26, 2002.

=== Pittsburgh Steelers ===
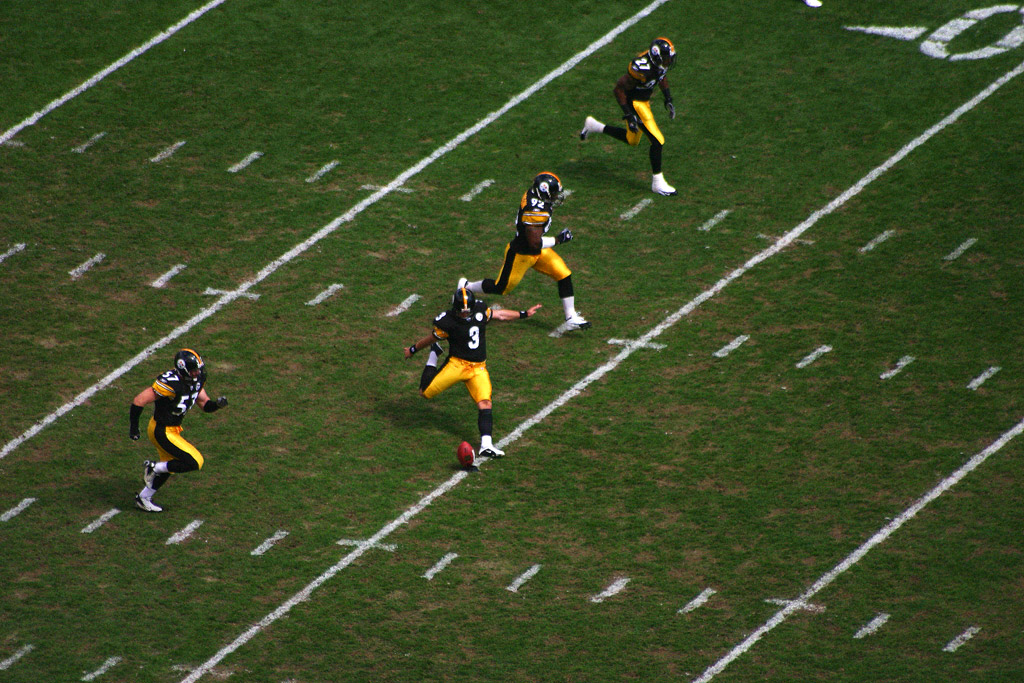
Reed kicks off during the 2006 season

Reed joined the Pittsburgh Steelers as a free agent on November 19, 2002. Originally signed as a midseason replacement to the injured Todd Peterson, Reed quickly contributed to the team, finishing the season with 100 points, which led to the team releasing Peterson in the offseason and making Reed their primary kicker.

During the Steelers 2005 AFC Divisional Playoff game against the New York Jets, Reed kicked a 33-yard field goal in overtime after his New York counterpart Doug Brien missed two field goals. During the 2005–06 NFL playoffs, where the Steelers eventually won Super Bowl XL, Reed successfully kicked all three field goal attempts and converted all fourteen of his potential PATs. Reed's streak of 189 consecutive successful PAT's (210 including post-seasons), dating back to the Steelers' week 16 victory over the Chargers in 2003, came to an end on Monday November 3, 2008, against the Washington Redskins.

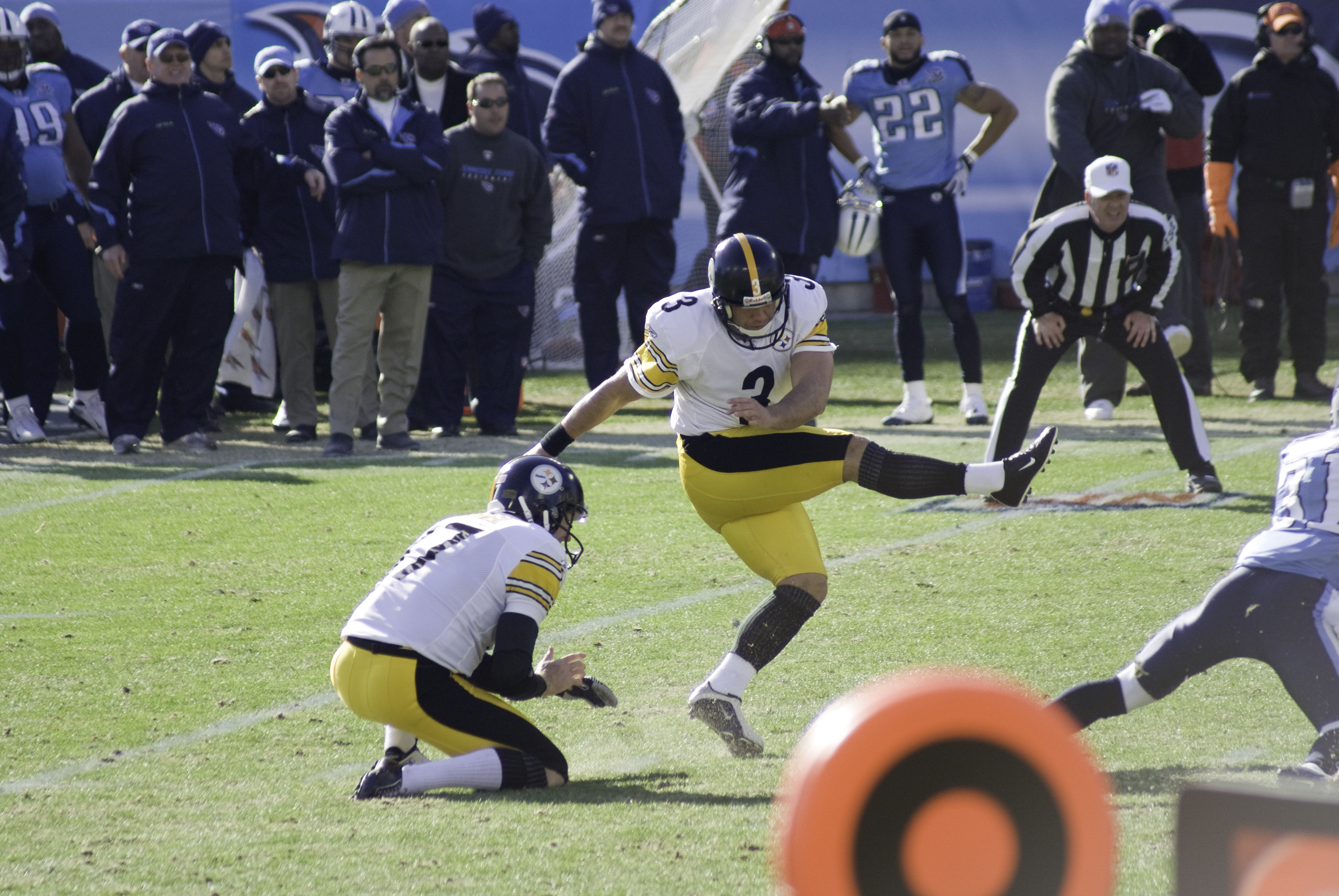
Reed during a field goal attempt in 2008

During Super Bowl XLIII, Reed went 2-for-2 on field goals and 3-for-3 on extra points in the Steelers 27–23 victory over the Arizona Cardinals.

Reed is the third-highest scoring Steeler. His 733 points trails Gary Anderson's 1,343 and Chris Boswell's 1097 (as of December 1, 2024). Reed's fallout with the Steelers began on October 18, 2009, Reed was cited again for public intoxication and disorderly conduct related charges on October 18, 2009, hours after the team defeated the Cleveland Browns. The incident occurred when Steelers tight end Matt Spaeth was cited for urinating in public, and Reed refused to comply with police orders to go back inside his SUV. He later apologized to his team for his conduct.

Reed was franchise tagged during the 2010 offseason, and signed his one-year tender on April 13, 2010.

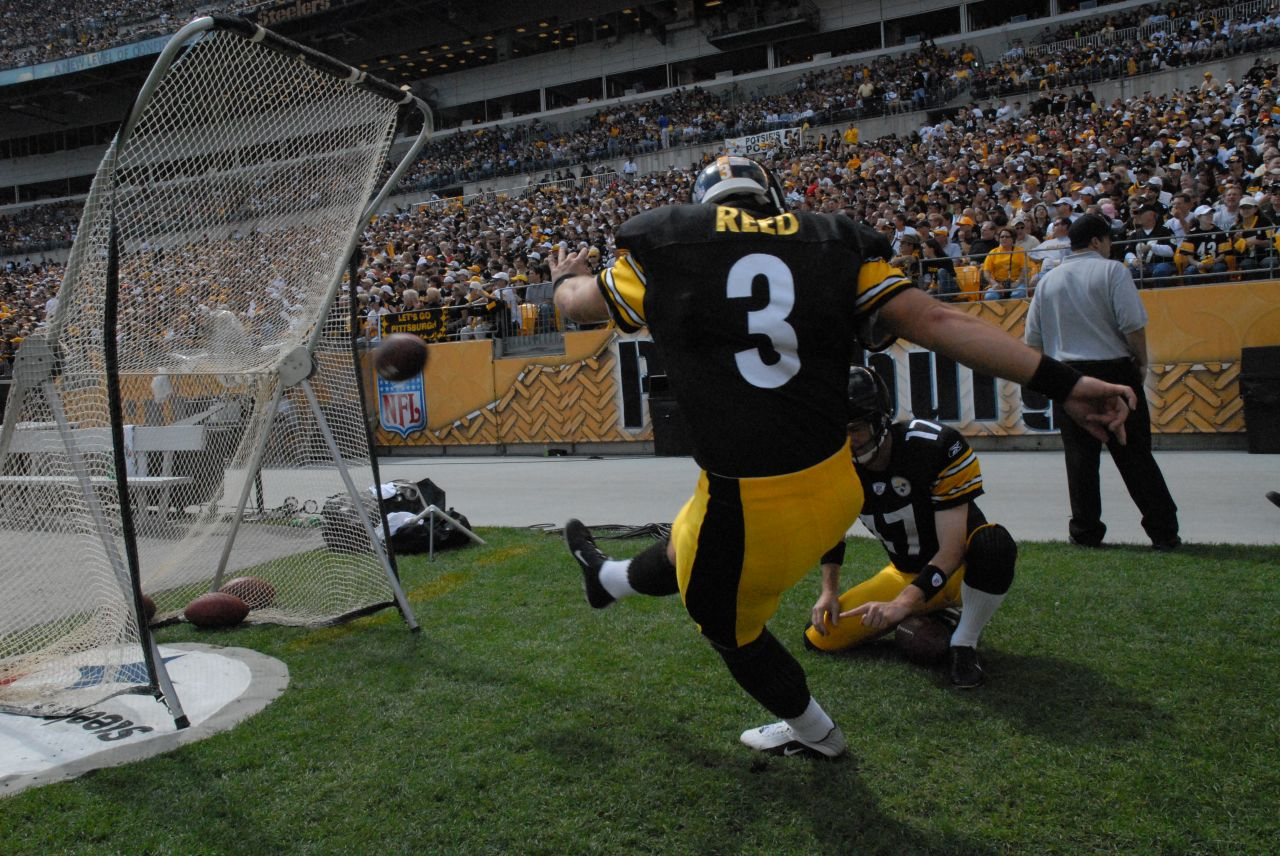
Reed warming up before a game against the Cincinnati Bengals

Reed was released on November 16, 2010, two days after missing a 26-yard field goal against the New England Patriots. He was replaced by Shaun Suisham. Reed went unclaimed through waivers and became a free agent, free to sign with any team and still collect the balance of his Steelers' contract ($160,000 each week) for the year in addition to any pay he received from signing with a new team.

On November 18, 2010, two days after Reed was released by the Steelers, the Cincinnati Bengals offered Reed a contract. However, he declined.

=== San Francisco 49ers ===
On December 2, 2010, Reed signed with the San Francisco 49ers to replace their injured kicker, Joe Nedney. Reed had a good outing in his first game, going 3 for 3, including a 44-yard field goal. Reed finished his five-game 49ers' career having hit all of his 13 extra-point attempts and 9 of 10 field goal tries.

=== Seattle Seahawks ===
Reed signed with the Seattle Seahawks on August 3, 2011, but was released by the team on September 4.

== Personal life ==
Reed's father, Morris, played basketball for Wichita State and his mother, Pam, was a cheerleader for Wichita State. His sister, Kristen, played soccer at UNC Charlotte and one year professionally for the Carolina Speed.

Reed does charity work with "Kick For Kids," which donates $300 for every field goal he makes. Reed is involved in Junior Achievement, does commercials for the University of Pittsburgh Medical Center, and helped a family raise money for a 5-year-old who had a brain tumor.

Reed is known to be eccentric. This has included instances of Reed bleaching his hair and letting it grow out, as well as wearing fuchsia clothing to match his girlfriend's outfit for the team's annual fashion show to raise money for breast cancer awareness. One year for training camp, Reed voluntarily carried around a pink backpack since the team had no rookies on special teams, who would usually carry around the backpack.

While in Pittsburgh, Reed was frequently seen in section C27 of Pittsburgh Penguins games when the Penguins played in Mellon Arena. After the Steelers' win in Super Bowl XLIII, Reed dropped the ceremonial first puck at the Penguins-Tampa Bay Lightning game on February 4, 2009. For the occasion, he wore a rare gold throwback Sunday Mario Lemieux jersey from the mid-1980s.

Reed was cited by police on the night of February 14, 2009, for disorderly conduct and criminal mischief for destroying a paper towel holder in a bathroom at a Sheetz convenience store in New Alexandria, Pennsylvania. Reed was reportedly angry that the men's restroom was out of paper towels. He pleaded guilty to the two summary offenses and was fined $543.50.

Reed was cited again for public intoxication and disorderly conduct related charges on October 18, 2009, hours after the team defeated the Cleveland Browns. The incident occurred when tight end Matt Spaeth was cited for urinating in public, and Reed refused to comply with police orders to go back inside his SUV. He later apologized to his team for his conduct.

Reed hosted a Saturday morning talk show on WZGV-AM in Charlotte.
