= Daniel Sepulveda =

American football player (born 1984)

- Sepulveda with the Pittsburgh Steelers in 2007

No. 9
- Position: Punter

Personal information
- Born: January 12, 1984 (age 42); Austin, Texas, U.S.
- Listed height: 6 ft 3 in (1.91 m)
- Listed weight: 229 lb (104 kg)

Career information
- High school: Highland Park (University Park, Texas)
- College: Baylor (2002–2006)
- NFL draft: 2007: 4th round, 112th overall pick

Career history
- Pittsburgh Steelers (2007–2011)

Awards and highlights
- Super Bowl champion (XLIII); PFWA All-Rookie Team (2007); 2× Ray Guy Award (2004, 2006); Unanimous All-American (2006); 2× Second-team All-American (2004, 2005); Big 12 Special Teams Player of the Year (2006); 3× First-team All-Big 12 (2004, 2005, 2006); Second-team All-Big 12 (2003)

Career NFL statistics
- Punts: 221
- Punting yards: 9,657
- Punting average: 43.7
- Longest punt: 66
- Inside 20: 81
- Stats at Pro Football Reference

Daniel Wade Sepulveda (born January 12, 1984) is an American former professional football player who was a punter for five seasons in the National Football League (NFL), all with the Pittsburgh Steelers. He played college football for the Baylor Bears, where he won twice the Ray Guy Award and earned All-American honors. He was selected by the Steelers in the fourth round of the 2007 NFL draft.

== Early life ==
Sepulveda, who is of Mexican–American descent, was born in Austin, Texas. He attended Highland Park High School in metropolitan Dallas, Texas. Sepulveda was a fourth-string punter at Highland Park behind Ryan Wolcott (the kicker), Jason Wood (the backup), and Trey Warren (the starter). He never made it into a game as a punter.

== College career ==
Sepulveda attended Baylor University, where he played for the Baylor Bears football team from 2002 to 2006. He was a walk-on to the football team as a linebacker, and after a redshirt freshman season (despite not having punted since junior high) became the Bears' starting punter, earning a scholarship after the 2003 season. He won the Ray Guy Award tapping him as the best college punter in 2004 and 2006, and was recognized as a consensus first-team All-American in 2004 and a unanimous first-team All-American in 2006. He, Ryan Allen and Tom Hackett are the only players to win the Ray Guy Award twice.

As of the end of the 2017 season, Sepulveda holds the NCAA FBS record for career punting average and career punts of 50+ yards.

== Professional career ==
Sepulveda was selected in the fourth round (112th pick) by the Pittsburgh Steelers in the 2007 NFL draft. After the release of former starter Chris Gardocki, Sepulveda successfully bested Mike Barr for the starting job. Sepulveda signed a three-year contract for $1.46 million with the Steelers on May 31, 2007.

In the first quarter of a December 20 game against the St. Louis Rams, in his rookie season, Sepulveda completed a 32-yard pass to running back Najeh Davenport on a fake punt play.

On July 29, 2008, Sepulveda tore the ACL in his right leg for the second time. He had surgery to repair a torn anterior cruciate ligament on August 6. He was placed on injured reserve by the Steelers after the surgery, officially ending his season.

On December 5, 2010, he again injured his right knee in a game against the Baltimore Ravens. Jeremy Kapinos was signed to replace Sepulveda. On July 31, 2011, the Steelers re-signed Sepulveda to a 1-year deal.

In the second quarter of an October 9, 2011, game against the Tennessee Titans Sepulveda completed his second career pass for a first down, a 33-yard pass to Ryan Mundy on a fake punt play. Sepulveda finished his career with a completion percentage of 100%: 2 for 2.

It was announced on April 4, 2012, that Sepulveda would not return to the Steelers for the 2012 season.

== NFL career statistics ==
Legend
	Led the league
**Bold**	Career high

=== Regular season ===
Year	Team	Punting									
Year	Team	GP	Punts	Yds	Net Yds	Lng	Avg	Net Avg	Blk	Ins20	TB
2007	PIT	16	68	2,880	2,574	59	42.4	37.9	0	28	2
2009	PIT	16	**72**	**3,074**	**2,669**	60	42.7	37.1	0	**29**	4
2010	PIT	12	56	2,550	2,192	62	45.5	**39.1**	0	16	**8**
2011	PIT	8	25	1,153	1,016	**66**	**46.1**	**39.1**	**1**	8	5
Career		52	221	9,657	8,451	66	43.7	38.1	1	81	19

=== Postseason ===
Year	Team	Punting									
Year	Team	GP	Punts	Yds	Net Yds	Lng	Avg	Net Avg	Blk	Ins20	TB
2007	PIT	1	4	177	146	48	44.3	36.5	0	1	0
Career		1	4	177	146	48	44.3	36.5	0	1	0

== Post-football career ==
Sepulveda enrolled at the SMU Dedman School of Law as part of its 2019 graduating class.

In 2023, he joined as an attorney the brand new, Dallas-based law firm Campbell Miller Payne as a charter member. He previously worked as a corporate finance lawyer for Norton Rose Fulbright.
