= Santonio Holmes =

American football player (born 1984)

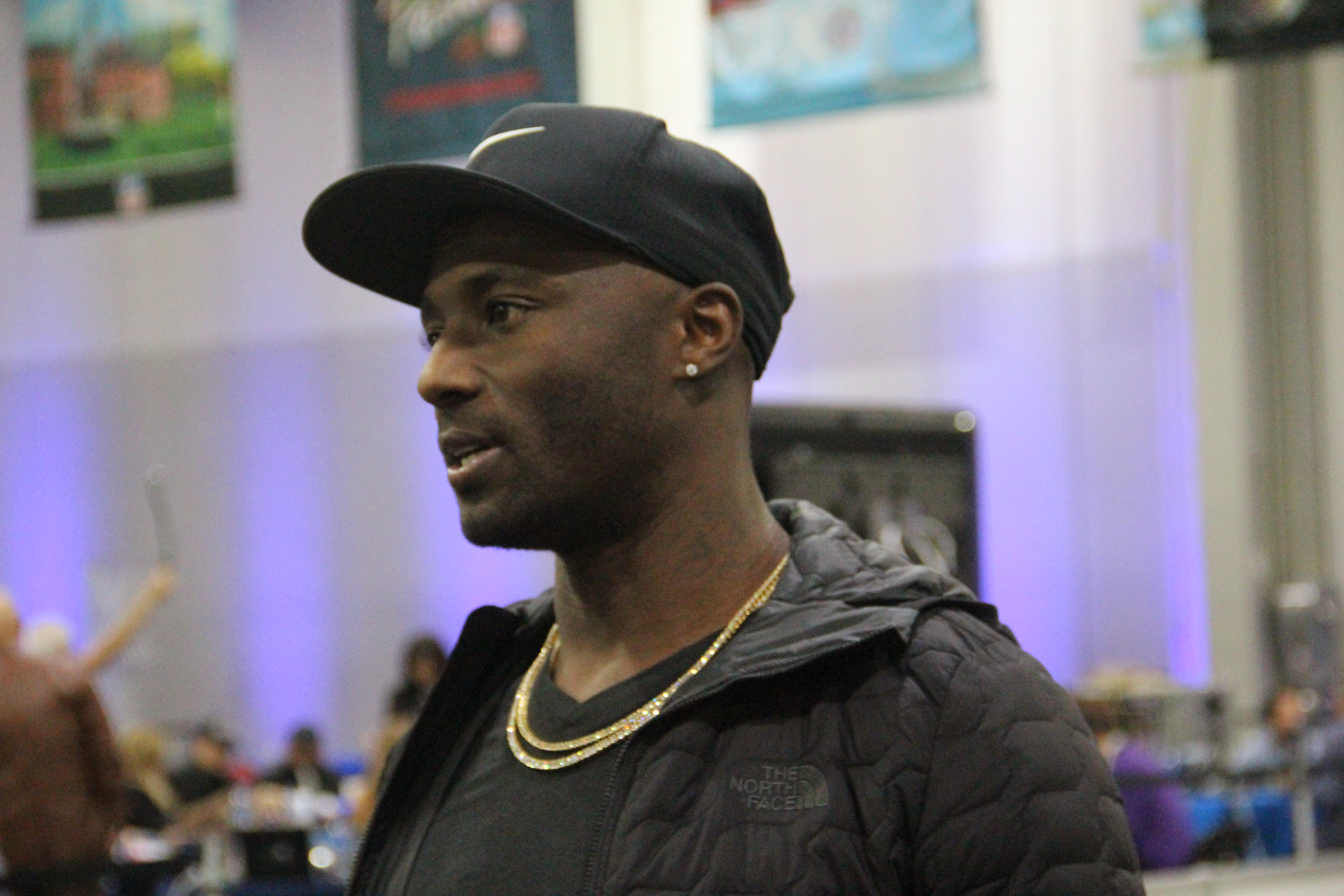
- Holmes in 2019

Central State Marauders
- Title: Wide receivers coach

Personal information
- Born: March 3, 1984 (age 42); Belle Glade, Florida, U.S.
- Listed height: 5 ft 11 in (1.80 m)
- Listed weight: 192 lb (87 kg)

Career information
- High school: Glades Central (Belle Glade)
- College: Ohio State (2002–2005)
- NFL draft: 2006: 1st round, 25th overall pick

Career history

Playing
- Pittsburgh Steelers (2006–2009); New York Jets (2010–2013); Chicago Bears (2014)

Coaching
- Central State (2025–present) Wide receivers coach

Awards and highlights
- Super Bowl champion (XLIII); Super Bowl MVP (XLIII); BCS national champion (2002); First-team All-Big Ten (2005); Second-team All-Big Ten (2004)

Career NFL statistics
- Receptions: 389
- Receiving yards: 6,030
- Receiving touchdowns: 36
- Stats at Pro Football Reference

Santonio Holmes Jr. (born March 3, 1984) is an American former professional football player who was a wide receiver in the National Football League (NFL) and current wide receivers coach for Central State University. He was selected by the Pittsburgh Steelers in the first round of the 2006 NFL draft after playing college football for the Ohio State Buckeyes. In 2009, Holmes was named the most valuable player (MVP) of Super Bowl XLIII, catching the game-winning touchdown. In 2010, Holmes was traded to the New York Jets in exchange for the Jets' fifth round pick. Holmes also played a season for the Chicago Bears.

== Early life ==
Holmes attended Glades Central High School in Belle Glade, Florida. He was a letterman in football, basketball, and track. In football, he helped lead his team to two state titles and a 12–1 record as a senior. In basketball, he helped lead his team to a state runner-up finish as a senior. In track, his team won the state title during his junior year, and he was the member of a 4x400 meter relay team that won two state titles, and recorded a personal-best time of 49.85 seconds in the 400 meters. Santonio graduated from Glades Central High School in 2002 with a 3.4 GPA.

== College career ==
Holmes attended Ohio State University where he was red shirted when the Buckeyes won the 2002 National Championship. Holmes caught 140 passes for 2,295 yards and 25 touchdowns, while gaining 3,123 all-purpose yards. His 140 career receptions and 3,496 yards were ranked the fifth highest totals in school history at the time. His 25 touchdown catches ranked him 3rd in the NCAA.

== Professional career ==
Pre-draft measurables
Height	Weight	Arm length	Hand span	40-yard dash	20-yard shuttle	Three-cone drill	Vertical jump	Broad jump	Wonderlic
5 ft 10 5/8 in (1.79 m)	188 lb (85 kg)	30 1/2 in (0.77 m)	8 7/8 in (0.23 m)	4.35 s	4.26 s	6.82 s	38 in (0.97 m)	10 ft 6 in (3.20 m)	23
All values from NFL Combine/Pro Day

=== Pittsburgh Steelers ===
==== 2006 ====
Holmes left college a year early and was taken in the first round (25th overall) of the 2006 NFL draft by the defending Super Bowl XL champion Pittsburgh Steelers. The 25th pick overall, he was the first receiver since Plaxico Burress taken in the first round by the Steelers. The Steelers traded up with the New York Giants from 31st to draft Holmes. Holmes, who wore number 4 at Ohio State (a number that wasn't issued to wide receivers in the NFL until 2021), was issued number 10, previously worn in Pittsburgh by former kicker Roy Gerela and quarterback Kordell Stewart.

Early on in the Steelers' disappointing 2006 season, Holmes was criticized for his poor performance on special teams as a returner, a role in which he fumbled frequently. However, Holmes had better success as a receiver, displaying his athleticism and skill in several of the Steelers' games. He earned Week 6 Diet Pepsi Rookie of the Week honors for his performance October 15 against the Kansas City Chiefs, totaling 58 yards receiving and 13 yards rushing.

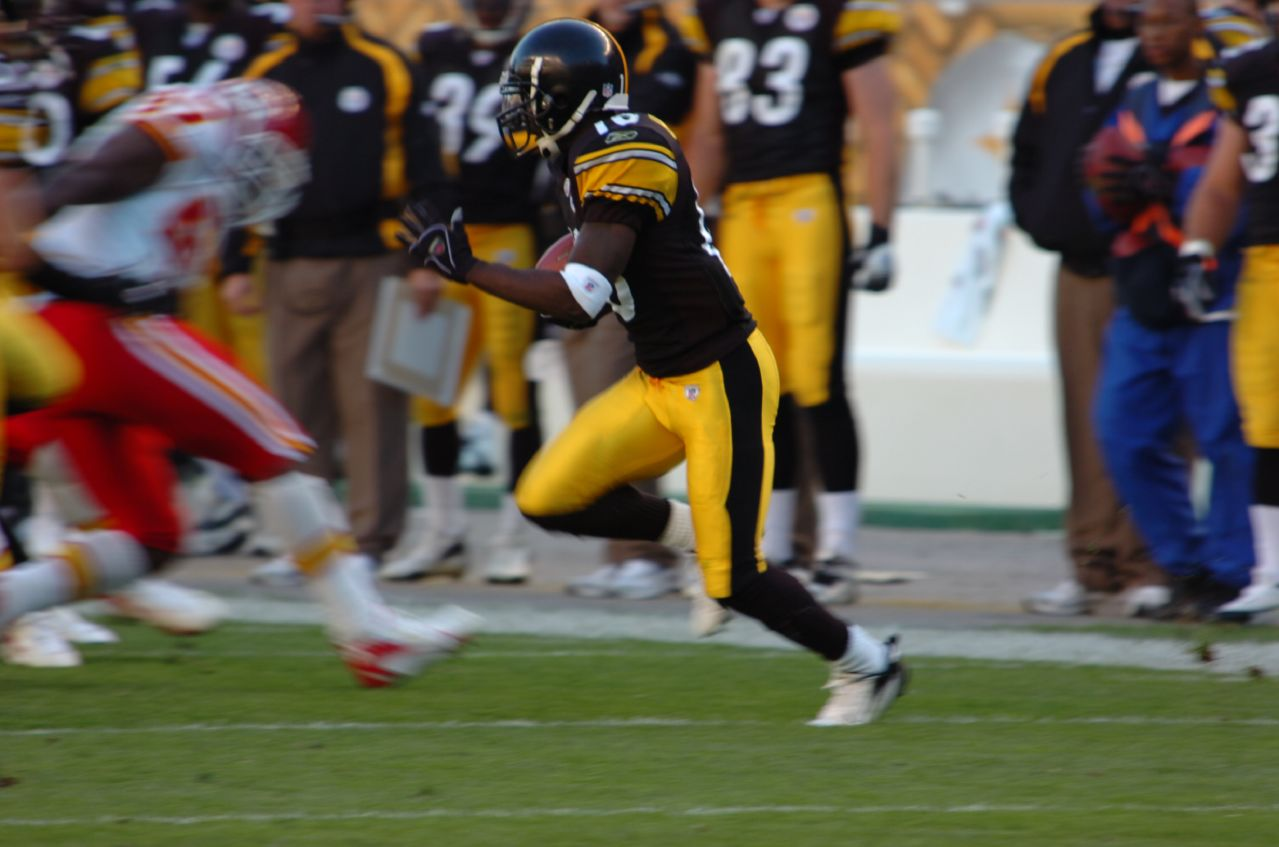
Santonio Holmes with the Pittsburgh Steelers in 2006.

Late in the season, Holmes replaced Cedrick Wilson in the starting lineup and finished the 2006 regular season with 49 receptions for 824 yards and 2 touchdowns. His best play of the season was also the last, when, in overtime of the Steelers' final game of the season against the Cincinnati Bengals, Holmes caught a pass from Ben Roethlisberger on a slant route and ran for a 67-yard touchdown to secure a win for the Steelers and knocking the rival Bengals out of playoff contention. He also returned a punt 65 yards for a touchdown on December 17 against the Carolina Panthers.

==== 2007 ====
Holmes was named the Steelers' starting split end coming into training camp. He enjoyed a breakout season in 2007 as he led the Steelers in receiving yards, receiving touchdowns, and emerged as one of the better known deep threats in the NFL. In Week 1 of the season against the Cleveland Browns, Holmes caught a 40-yard touchdown pass from Ben Roethlisberger as they went on to defeat the Browns 34–7. Week 4 in a loss against the Arizona Cardinals, he enjoyed one of the best games in his young pro career as he finished the game with six receptions, 128 yards, and two touchdown catches. In Week 9, he enjoyed another two touchdown game against the Baltimore Ravens, both touchdowns came in the first half. He finished the game with four catches, 110 yards, and two touchdowns. In Week 16, Santonio Holmes amassed the most yards receiving in a game in his career, as he finished the game with 133 yards receiving against the St. Louis Rams. He finished the year with 942 yards receiving and eight touchdown catches. He led the league in yards per catch.

In his first career playoff game, a 31–29 loss to the Jacksonville Jaguars, he finished the game with 3 catches, 49 yards, and a touchdown.

==== 2008 ====
Despite returning no punts throughout the 2007 season, Holmes explored returning again for the 2008 season. During the offseason, Holmes had set a goal to play in all 16 games throughout the season, increasing his weight by 11 pounds through workouts in the offseason.

Holmes began the season with 2 receptions for 19 yards in a win against the Houston Texans. In the following 10–6 win over the Cleveland Browns, Holmes totaled 94 yards on 5 receptions and had a carry for 10 yards. In the following loss to the Eagles, he recorded 3 receptions for 32 yards. Holmes saw his first score the following week in an overtime win against the Baltimore Ravens, finishing with 61 yards on 3 receptions for a touchdown. Following a bye week, Holmes totaled 89 yards on 5 receptions in the win against the Cincinnati Bengals.

However, Holmes was benched following being arrested for possession of marijuana. Holmes was benched by coach Tomlin twice. He was forced to miss the following loss to the New York Giants, but was activated again for the Monday Night game against the Washington Redskins. Statistically, Holmes' production decreased when compared to his 2007 stats. He declined in receptions, receiving yards, and receiving average. However, Holmes' still contributed big plays throughout the season, especially during the game versus the Cowboys where he caught a long pass that ignited a struggling Steelers offense.

In Super Bowl XLIII, Holmes secured the Steelers' NFL-record sixth Super Bowl win after catching a six-yard touchdown pass from Ben Roethlisberger with 35 seconds left in regulation. Holmes caught nine passes for 131 yards and a touchdown, including four receptions for 73 yards on their final game-winning drive. He was named Super Bowl MVP, becoming the sixth wide receiver to win the award, and also was the third Pittsburgh receiver to win the award, following Lynn Swann in Super Bowl X and Hines Ward in Super Bowl XL.

==== 2009 ====
Holmes started off the 2009 season with receptions for 131 yards and a touchdown in a 13–10 overtime win over the Tennessee Titans. In Week 13, against the Oakland Raiders, he had eight receptions for 149 yards in the 27–24 loss. Statistically, 2009 was the best season of Holmes' career. He had 79 catches, 1,248 receiving yards, and five touchdowns and became Pittsburgh's first receiving target in which was surprisingly his last year with the team.

=== New York Jets ===
==== 2010 ====
On April 11, 2010, Holmes was traded to the New York Jets in exchange for a fifth-round pick in the 2010 NFL draft (the Steelers eventually traded the pick to the Arizona Cardinals in exchange for a sixth round pick, which they used to draft Antonio Brown, and reacquiring Bryant McFadden; the Cardinals used the pick on quarterback John Skelton). Shortly before the trade, the NFL announced that Holmes would be suspended for the first four games of the season due to a violation of the NFL's substance abuse policy.

The trade came after Holmes' incident in a nightclub, coinciding with Ben Roethlisberger's own legal troubles, and the Steelers wanting to set an example for its other players. Had Holmes not been traded, the Steelers would have released him.

After serving a four-game suspension for violating the league's substance abuse policy, Holmes returned to practice on October 6, 2010. Although Holmes was forbidden to participate in practices with his teammates and he was suspended from playing for the Jets during their regular season contests, he was still eligible to attend team meetings and work out daily at the team's facilities.

On November 14, 2010, with 22 seconds to go in overtime against the Cleveland Browns, Holmes caught a pass on the Browns 31-yard line and carried it in for a touchdown, giving the Jets a 26–20 victory.

The next week, on November 21, 2010, Holmes caught a game-winning touchdown from Mark Sanchez with 10 seconds left and the Jets went on to beat the Houston Texans 30–27.

During the 2010–2011 postseason, Holmes scored a touchdown in both the Divisional Round and the AFC Championship. The Jets lost to Holmes' former team, the Pittsburgh Steelers. He was ranked 76th by his fellow players on the NFL Top 100 Players of 2011.

==== 2011 ====
Holmes re-signed with the Jets during the offseason, shortly before the start of 2011 season agreeing to a five-year deal. He was named one of the team captains, along with starting quarterback Mark Sanchez, before the season began. In the 4th quarter of the final game of the 2011 season against the Miami Dolphins, Holmes appeared to get into an argument with Jets offensive tackle Wayne Hunter while the team was huddling. As a result of the argument, Holmes was benched for the remainder of the game, and the Jets ended up losing the game, which resulted in the Jets missing the postseason for the first time in 3 years. His leadership qualities and credibility as a captain have since been questioned.

Holmes finished the season with just 51 catches, the second lowest total of his career, along with only 654 receiving yards, by far the lowest total of his career. He also finished with a career low 12.8 yards per reception average. He did, however, tally a new career high in touchdown receptions with eight.

==== 2012 ====
In Week 3 of the 2012 season, Holmes had nine receptions for 147 yards in a 23–20 overtime win over the Miami Dolphins. He was lost for the remainder of the 2012 season after sustaining a severe Lisfranc foot injury in Week 4 against the San Francisco 49ers, and was eventually placed on injured reserve. In the 2012 season, he appeared in four games and had 20 receptions for 272 yards and one touchdown.

==== 2013 ====
The Jets approached Holmes in the offseason to restructure his contract; Holmes obliged. Holmes' rehabilitation from foot surgery continued into training camp and the preseason. Holmes was removed from the active/physically unable to perform list and moved to the active roster on August 23, 2013. In Week 3 against the Buffalo Bills, he had five receptions for 154 yards and a touchdown in the 27–20 win. In the 2013 season, he had 23 receptions for 456 yards and one touchdown in 11 games.

Holmes was released by the Jets on March 10, 2014.

=== Chicago Bears ===
Holmes signed a one-year contract with the Chicago Bears on August 16, 2014. Holmes was waived on November 11, 2014, having played just nine games and totaling only eight receptions for 67 yards.

=== Retirement ===
After being out of the league for nearly three years, Holmes returned to the Steelers on October 10, 2017, for a retirement ceremony, saying: "It's an honor to retire as a member of the Steelers and leave a legacy everyone will remember."

== NFL career statistics ==
Legend
	Won the Super Bowl
	Super Bowl MVP
**Bold**	Career high

=== Regular season ===
Year	Team	Games		Receiving					Rushing					Fumbles	
Year	Team	GP	GS	Rec	Yds	Avg	Lng	TD	Att	Yds	Avg	Lng	TD	Fum	Lost
2006	PIT	16	4	49	824	16.8	67T	2	1	13	**13.0**	13	0	**5**	**2**
2007	PIT	13	13	52	942	18.1	**83**	**8**	**5**	17	3.4	11	0	2	0
2008	PIT	15	15	55	821	14.9	48	5	2	9	4.5	10	0	4	1
2009	PIT	16	16	**79**	**1,248**	15.8	57	5	3	6	2.0	7	0	0	0
2010	NYJ	12	10	52	746	14.3	52	6	2	17	8.5	14	0	2	**2**
2011	NYJ	16	16	51	654	12.8	38T	**8**	3	**27**	9.0	**23**	0	2	1
2012	NYJ	4	4	20	272	13.6	38	1	—	—	—	—	—	1	1
2013	NYJ	11	11	23	456	**19.8**	69T	1	—	—	—	—	—	0	0
2014	CHI	9	2	8	67	8.4	15	0	—	—	—	—	—	1	0
Total		112	91	389	6,030	15.5	83	36	16	89	5.6	23	0	17	7

=== Postseason ===
Year	Team	Games		Receiving					Rushing					Fumbles	
Year	Team	GP	GS	Rec	Yds	Avg	Lng	TD	Att	Yds	Avg	Lng	TD	Fum	Lost
2007	PIT	1	1	3	49	16.3	37	1	—	—	—	—	—	0	0
2008	PIT	3	2	**13**	**226**	**17.4**	**65**	**2**	**2**	**7**	**3.5**	**4**	0	**1**	0
2010	NYJ	3	2	9	127	14.1	45	**2**	—	—	—	—	—	0	0
Total		7	5	25	402	16.1	65	5	2	7	3.5	4	0	1	0

== Legal trouble ==
Holmes has acknowledged selling drugs on the street corner of his hometown of Belle Glade, Florida as a teenager; he says that his mother's influence and a desire to play professional football made him decide to stop.

Holmes was arrested in Miami Beach, Florida on May 27, 2006, for disorderly conduct. Charges were subsequently dropped after Holmes paid a fine. Holmes was arrested for a second time on June 18, 2006, for domestic violence and assault in Columbus, Ohio.

On July 7, 2006, Holmes appeared in Franklin County Court in Columbus, Ohio for both a pre-trial hearing regarding the domestic case and a hearing regarding the traffic ticket. He pleaded no contest to the traffic ticket and agreed to pay a fine. While Lashae Boone, the mother of Holmes' daughter and the victim in the assault case, requested that the domestic violence and assault charges be dropped, the prosecutor refused. Boone and their daughter accompanied Holmes to court. The charges were later dropped.

On October 23, 2008, Holmes was arrested in Pittsburgh and cited by officers for possession of marijuana. He released an apology after missing a game, stating that he wished to "focus all of [his] efforts on helping our team win on the field and achieve its ultimate goal."

On March 24, 2010, Anshonae Mills filed a lawsuit against Holmes over a March 7 incident in which she alleges Holmes threw a glass at her in an Orlando nightclub, resulting in a cut above her eye. Initially, Mills did not pursue charges, claiming Holmes and the police intimidated her into it, but the case has been reopened. Subsequently, after a Twitter comment criticizing the nightclub incident, Holmes told the follower to "kill urself". He later Tweeted it was time to "wake n bake", a reference to marijuana. Holmes alleges his account was hacked and it was not him making the comments.

On April 29, 2010, according to a report filed by authorities at Pittsburgh International Airport, a flight attendant told police that Holmes would not turn off his iPod when requested and asked that officers speak to him. Holmes got off the Colgan Air flight and spoke to the officers, who reminded him to comply with regulations, but did not charge the wide receiver with anything. Holmes later talked to Jets head coach Rex Ryan about the incident.
