= Matt Spaeth =

American football player (born 1983)

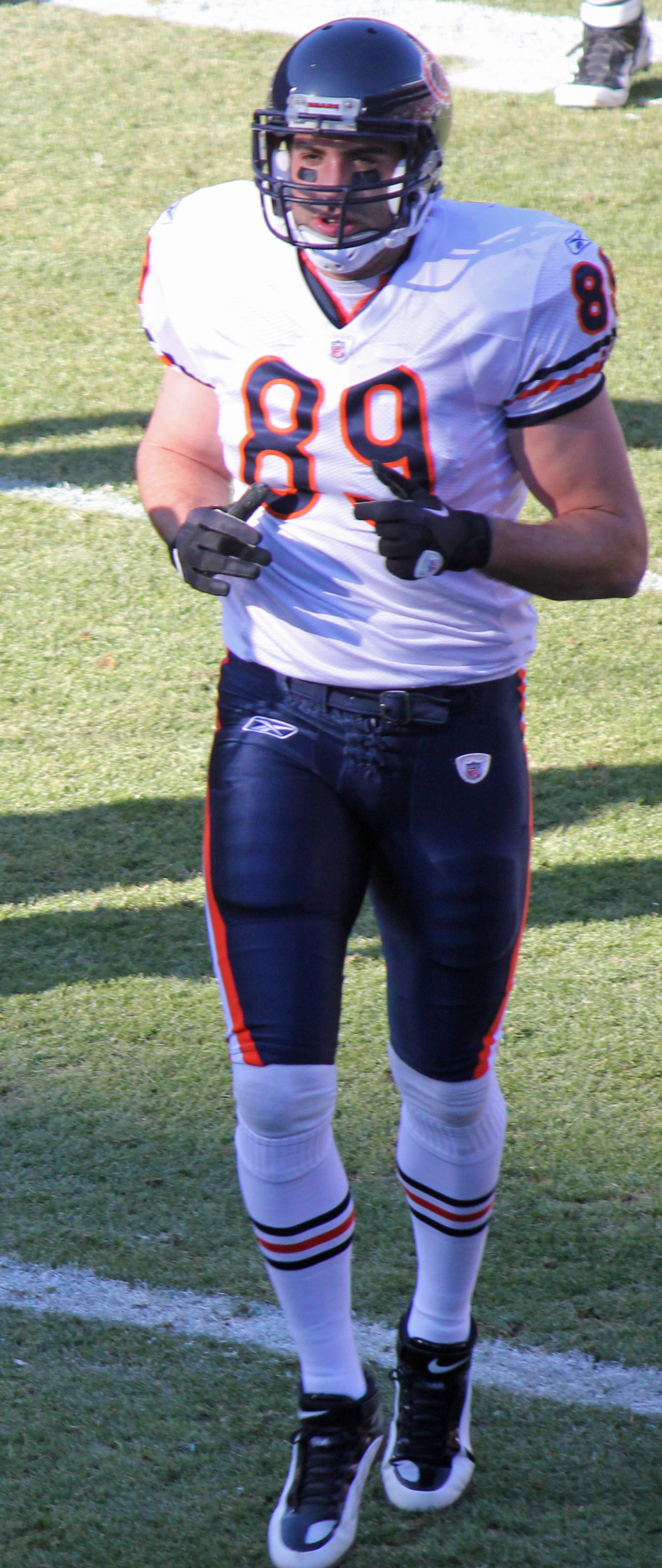
- Spaeth with the Chicago Bears in 2011

No. 89, 87
- Position: Tight end

Personal information
- Born: November 24, 1983 (age 42); St. Michael, Minnesota, U.S.
- Listed height: 6 ft 7 in (2.01 m)
- Listed weight: 270 lb (122 kg)

Career information
- High school: St. Michael-Albertville
- College: Minnesota (2002–2006)
- NFL draft: 2007: 3rd round, 77th overall pick

Career history
- Pittsburgh Steelers (2007–2010); Chicago Bears (2011–2012); Pittsburgh Steelers (2013–2015)

Awards and highlights
- Super Bowl champion (XLIII); John Mackey Award (2006); Ozzie Newsome Award (2006); First-team All-American (2006); 2× First-team All-Big Ten (2005-2006); Freshman All-American (2003)

Career NFL statistics
- Receptions: 55
- Receiving yards: 420
- Receiving touchdowns: 10
- Stats at Pro Football Reference

Matt Spaeth (born November 24, 1983) is an American former professional football player who was a tight end in the National Football League (NFL). He played college football for the Minnesota Golden Gophers, where he was twice named first-team All-Big Ten, once a first-team All-American, and the 2006 winner of the John Mackey Award.

He was selected by the Pittsburgh Steelers in the third round of the 2007 NFL draft and played seven seasons for them, becoming a Super Bowl champion when the Steelers won Super Bowl XLIII. He also played two seasons for the Chicago Bears.

== Early life ==
Spaeth graduated from St. Michael-Albertville, in St. Michael, Minnesota in 2002, where he played both football and basketball. St. Michael was in the Wright County Conference at the time. Spaeth holds multiple records at St. Michael-Albertville in both sports. As a three-year starter in basketball he set records for most rebounds in a game (23), most steals in a game (8), most points in a career (1359), and most career rebounds (804).

== College career ==
Spaeth played college football at Minnesota. In 2003, Matt started the season as a reserve, but was inserted into the starting lineup when starter Ben Utecht got injured. Spaeth went on to start 10 games where he had 12 catches for 98 yards and was named to the Sportingnews.com and Rivals.com Freshman All-American team.

In 2004, Matt increased his production to 24 catches for 298 yards and 4 touchdowns. He started every game was an honorable mention pick to the All-Big Ten Team.

In 2005, Spaeth again started every game, hauling in 26 catches for 333 yards and 4 touchdowns. He was named to the All-Big Ten First-team.

2006 was the most productive season of Spaeth's career. Despite playing the last month of the season with a separated shoulder, Matt went on to get career highs in receptions (47) & receiving yards (564), and tied his career high in touchdowns (4). For the second consecutive year, he was named to the All-Big Ten First-team, and in December was named a First-team All American. He was also awarded the team's Bronko Nagurski Most Valuable Player Award. Spaeth did not play in the Insight Bowl on December 29 because of an injured shoulder.

== Professional career ==
Pre-draft measurables
Height	Weight	Arm length	Hand span	40-yard dash
6 ft 7 1/8 in (2.01 m)	270 lb (122 kg)	34 in (0.86 m)	10 3/8 in (0.26 m)	4.83 s
All values from NFL Combine

=== Pittsburgh Steelers (first stint) ===
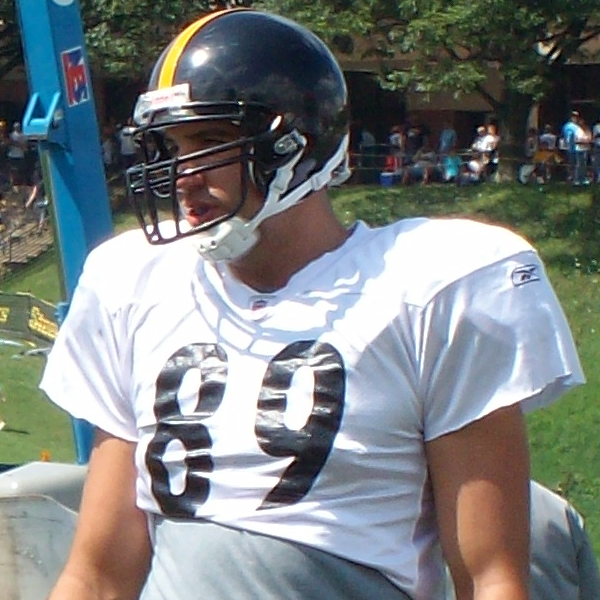
Spaeth at the Steelers 2008 training camp

Spaeth was selected by the Pittsburgh Steelers in the third round of the 2007 NFL draft. Spaeth started the season primarily on the goal line package and special teams. Spaeth's first catch in the NFL was a touchdown – catching a 5-yard pass from Ben Roethlisberger in the Steelers' 34–7 win over the Cleveland Browns on September 9, 2007. When second-string tight end Jerame Tuman was placed on injured reserve, Spaeth was promoted to second-string.

Spaeth caught 5 passes for 34 yards and 3 touchdowns in the 2007 NFL season.

In the 2008 season, Spaeth added 17 more catches to his career and 136 yards during the regular season. Along with both an increase in catches and yards, Spaeth also played in Super Bowl XLIII where he had one catch for six yards. The Steelers went on to win 27–23 over the Arizona Cardinals. In 2009, Spaeth had 5 catches for 25 yards and 1 touchdown.

At the end of the 2010 season, Spaeth and the Steelers appeared in Super Bowl XLV against the Green Bay Packers. He had one reception for nine yards in the 31–25 loss.

=== Chicago Bears ===
As an unrestricted free agent following the 2010 season, Spaeth signed with the Chicago Bears, who then traded away tight end Greg Olsen. Spaeth scored his first touchdown catch with the Bears in Week 1 against the Atlanta Falcons on a one-yard pass from Jay Cutler.

On March 13, 2013, Spaeth was released by the Bears, being the last Bear to wear number 89, which was retired on December 8, 2013, in honor of tight end and Super Bowl XX winning head coach Mike Ditka.

=== Pittsburgh Steelers (second stint) ===
On March 15, 2013, Spaeth re-signed with the Steelers.

On November 2, 2014, he caught Ben Roethlisberger's record-breaking 12th touchdown in two games.

On March 9, 2015, it was announced that the Steelers had signed Spaeth to a two-year contract extension.

On July 21, 2016, the Steelers released Spaeth due to a failed physical.

== NFL career statistics ==
Year	Team	GP	Rec	Yds	Avg	Lng	TD
2007	PIT	14	5	34	6.8	13T	3
2008	PIT	16	17	136	8.0	13	0
2009	PIT	16	5	25	5.0	9	1
2010	PIT	14	9	80	8.9	13	1
2011	CHI	15	7	50	7.1	13	2
2012	CHI	16	6	28	4.7	13T	1
2013	PIT	4	1	11	11.0	11T	1
2014	PIT	15	3	46	15.3	33T	1
2015	PIT	13	2	10	5.0	6	0
Career		123	55	420	7.6	33T	10
