= Gerran Walker =

American gridiron football player (born 1983)

No. 19
- Position: Wide receiver

Personal information
- Born: October 2, 1983 (age 43); Atlanta, Georgia, U.S.
- Listed height: 5 ft 10 in (1.78 m)
- Listed weight: 185 lb (84 kg)

Career information
- College: Lehigh
- NFL draft: 2006: undrafted

Career history
- Indianapolis Colts (2006)*; San Diego Chargers (2006)*; Pittsburgh Steelers (2007–2008)*; Saskatchewan Roughriders (2008–2009); Toronto Argonauts (2010)*
- * Offseason or practice squad member only

Gerran Walker (born October 2, 1983) is an American former football wide receiver. He was originally signed by the Indianapolis Colts as an undrafted free agent in 2006.

He played college football at Lehigh.

== Early life ==
Walker attended Alonzo Crim High School in Atlanta, Georgia and was a letterman in football, basketball, baseball, and track.

== Professional career ==
From 2006 to 2008, he was signed to the practice rosters of the San Diego Chargers and Pittsburgh Steelers.

From 2008 to 2009, he was a member of the CFL's Saskatchewan Roughriders, playing 19 games and amassing a combined 866 yards.

On February 25, 2010, Walker signed as a free agent for the Toronto Argonauts as a wide receiver/kick returner. He was released by the team on July 8, 2010.
