= John Walls =

John Walls may refer to:

- John Walls (cricketer)
- John Walls (priest)
- John Abbet Walls, American engineer and businessman

== See also ==
- John Wall (disambiguation)
