= List of people from Niagara Falls, New York =

This is a list of notable people from Niagara Falls, New York.

== Artists ==
- George Barker, photographer nationally famous for Niagara Falls photos
- Thomas Aquinas Daly, landscape and still life painter
- Ruth Dicker, landscape painter
- Jeremiah Goodman, illustrator
- Shelley Niro, Mohawk filmmaker and visual artist
- Alice Wadowski-Bak, artist, creator of wycinanki

== Authors and journalists ==
- Barbara Frum, Canadian television journalist, born in Niagara Falls, NY
- Jane Bryant Quinn, financial journalist
- Lilian Whiting, journalist, author

== Bands, composers, and musicians ==
- Gary Baker, Grammy Award-winning songwriter
- Glen Benton, death metal musician
- Robert Nathaniel Dett, composer
- Richard Ray Farrell, electric blues guitarist, harmonicist, singer and songwriter, born in Niagara Falls
- William Masselos, classical pianist
- Chauncey Morehouse, jazz drummer
- Bobby Previte, drummer and composer
- Tommy Tedesco, born in Niagara Falls, most-recorded guitarist in history

== Business and industry ==
- Francis R. Delano, banker, first warden of Minnesota State Prison, first general superintendent of St. Paul & Pacific Railway
- Frank A. Dudley, former lawyer, politician, hotelier and business owner
- Dawne Hickton, CEO of RTI International Metals

== Entertainers and actors ==
- R. J. Adams (Bob Shannon), actor and radio personality, attended Bishop Duffy High School
- Mark Bridges, costume designer
- Charles Cyphers, actor
- Julie Gregg, actress
- Rachael Lillis, voice actress
- April Stevens, pop singer, best known for her recording of "Deep Purple" with her brother Nino Tempo
- Nino Tempo, pop singer, best known for his recording of "Deep Purple" with his sister April Stevens
- Franchot Tone, actor, born in Niagara Falls

== Military ==
- John P. Bobo, received Medal of Honor
- Peter Buell Porter, US Secretary of War

== Politics and law ==
- Earl Brydges, New York state senator
- John T. Bush, New York state senator
- John Ceretto, New York state assemblyman
- Robert H. Gittins, U.S. congressman
- George W. Grider, U.S. congressman from Tennessee
- Lorraine Hunt, lt. governor of Nevada
- Pat E. Johnson, president of National Tang Soo Do Congress
- Nancy J. King, Maryland state senator
- Joe Micon, Indiana legislator
- John Moses, Illinois assemblyman
- Michael Mulligan, lead prosecutor in the courts-martial of Hasan Akbar and Nidal Malik Hasan
- Peter A. Porter, poet and village president of Niagara Falls
- Arthur Schoellkopf, mayor of Niagara Falls, New York
- James S. Simmons, U.S. congressman
- Richard D. Simons, chief judge of New York Court of Appeals
- Thomas Vincent Welch, New York state assemblyman, first superintendent of New York State Reservation at Niagara

== Religion, charities, social advocacy ==
- George W. Comstock, public health physician
- Brent Nicholson Earle, AIDS activist
- Robert Elderfield, chemist
- Scott H. Faulring, historian, document editor
- Lois Gibbs, environmental activist
- Orange Judd, agricultural chemist
- James Thomas Stevens, poet, academic

== Sports ==
- Benny Bengough, baseball player and member of the New York Yankees team which won their first World Series title in 1923
- Dean Biasucci, NFL placekicker
- David Bright, professional diver
- Walter Cazen, baseball player
- Adam Clendening, NHL defenseman (raised in nearby Wheatfield)
- Greg Cox, NFL safety
- Modie Cox, basketball player
- Dan DeSantis, football player for Philadelphia Eagles
- Walter Dick, member of U.S. National Soccer Hall of Fame
- Rashad Evans, MMA fighter
- Marcus Feagin, basketball player
- Jonny Flynn, NBA basketball player, Minnesota Timberwolves
- William Frazer, Olympic sport shooter
- Hank Gornicki, MLB player
- Steve Hamilton, NFL defensive end
- Paul Harris, basketball player
- Ben Hayes, MLB relief pitcher
- Robert Heisner, martial arts expert and minister
- Ellis Hobbs, cornerback for Philadelphia Eagles
- Richard Jacob, basketball coach
- Daryl Johnston, NFL player
- Wayne Krivsky, MLB executive
- Chuck Leo, AFL player
- Marc Magliarditi, hockey goaltender
- Sal Maglie, baseball pitcher
- Rick Manning, baseball player
- Tony Marino, amateur competitive bodybuilder and power lifter
- Matt Mazza, basketball player
- Vince Mazza, NFL player and Canadian football all-star
- Marc Mero, WWE professional wrestler
- John Moir, professional basketball player
- Hank Nichols, college basketball referee
- Qadree Ollison, NFL running back
- Johnny Pasek, baseball player
- Nick Sebek, NFL quarterback
- James Starks, football player for Green Bay Packers
- Tara VanDerveer, women's basketball coach at Stanford
- Kerry Von Erich, professional wrestler
- Jesse Winker, baseball player
- Tim Winn, basketball player

== Other ==
- Vincent DePaul Lynch, university professor
- Peter Magaddino, mobster
- Stefano Magaddino, mafia boss
- William Chandler Shrubsall, inmate
- Charlie Utter, Wild West figure
- Tobias Witmer, Pennsylvania German dialect poet, surveyor, and American Civil War veteran
