= 2008–09 NFL playoffs =

American football tournament

- Dates: January 3 – February 1, 2009
- Season: 2008
- Teams: 12
- Games played: 11
- Super Bowl XLIII site: Raymond James Stadium; Tampa, Florida
- Defending champions: New York Giants
- Champion: Pittsburgh Steelers (6th title)
- Runner-up: Arizona Cardinals
- Conference runners-up: Baltimore Ravens; Philadelphia Eagles
NFL playoffs
← 2007–08	2009–10 →

The National Football League playoffs for the 2008 season began on January 3, 2009. The postseason tournament concluded with the Pittsburgh Steelers defeating the Arizona Cardinals in Super Bowl XLIII, 27–23, on February 1, at Raymond James Stadium in Tampa, Florida.

This was the first time since the 1979 NFL season where neither of the first-seeded teams made it to their respective conference championships. This would once again occur in 2010, and 2021.

== Participants ==
Within each conference, the four division winners and the top two non-division winners with the best overall regular season records) qualified for the playoffs. The four division winners are seeded 1–4 based on their overall won-lost-tied record, and the wild card teams are seeded 5–6. The NFL does not use a fixed bracket playoff system, and there are no restrictions regarding teams from the same division matching up in any round. In the first round, dubbed the wild-card playoffs or wild-card weekend, the third-seeded division winner hosts the sixth-seed wild card, and the fourth seed hosts the fifth. The 1 and 2 seeds from each conference received a first-round bye. In the second round, the divisional playoffs, the number 1 seed hosts the worst-surviving seed from the first round (seed 4, 5, or 6), while the number 2 seed will play the other team (seed 3, 4, or 5). The two surviving teams from each conference's divisional playoff games met in the respective AFC and NFC Conference Championship games, hosted by the higher seed. Although the Super Bowl, the championship round of the playoffs, is played at a neutral site, the designated home team is based on an annual rotation by conference.

Playoff seeds
Seed	AFC	NFC
1	Tennessee Titans (South winner)	New York Giants (East winner)
2	Pittsburgh Steelers (North winner)	Carolina Panthers (South winner)
3	Miami Dolphins (East winner)	Minnesota Vikings (North winner)
4	San Diego Chargers (West winner)	Arizona Cardinals (West winner)
5	Indianapolis Colts (wild card)	Atlanta Falcons (wild card)
6	Baltimore Ravens (wild card)	Philadelphia Eagles (wild card)

== Bracket ==
Jan 4 – Dolphin Stadium	Jan 10 – LP Field
6	Baltimore	27
6	Baltimore	13
3	Miami	9	Jan 18 – Heinz Field
1	Tennessee	10
AFC
Jan 3 – Qualcomm Stadium	6	Baltimore	14
Jan 11 – Heinz Field
2	Pittsburgh	23
5	Indianapolis	17	AFC Championship
4	San Diego	24
4	San Diego	23*	Feb 1 – Raymond James Stadium
2	Pittsburgh	35
Wild-card round
Divisional round
Jan 4 – Hubert H. Humphrey Metrodome	A2	Pittsburgh	27
Jan 11 – Giants Stadium
N4	Arizona	23
6	Philadelphia	26	Super Bowl XLIII
6	Philadelphia	23
3	Minnesota	14	Jan 18 – University of Phoenix Stadium
1	NY Giants	11
NFC
Jan 3 – University of Phoenix Stadium	6	Philadelphia	25
Jan 10 – Bank of America Stadium
4	Arizona	32
5	Atlanta	24	NFC Championship
4	Arizona	33
4	Arizona	30
2	Carolina	13

* Indicates overtime victory

== Schedule ==
In the United States, NBC broadcast the first two Wild Card playoff games and Super Bowl XLIII (their first Super Bowl broadcast since Super Bowl XXXII at the end of the 1997–98 playoffs). CBS telecast the rest of the AFC playoff games and Fox the rest of the NFC games.

Round	Away team	Score	Home team	Date	Kickoff (ET / UTC–5)	TV
Wild-card round	Atlanta Falcons	24–30	Arizona Cardinals	January 3, 2009	4:30 p.m.	NBC
Wild-card round	Indianapolis Colts	17–23 (OT)	San Diego Chargers	January 3, 2009	8:00 p.m.	NBC
Wild-card round	Baltimore Ravens	27–9	Miami Dolphins	January 4, 2009	1:00 p.m.	CBS
Wild-card round	Philadelphia Eagles	26–14	Minnesota Vikings	January 4, 2009	4:30 p.m.	Fox
Divisional round	Baltimore Ravens	13–10	Tennessee Titans	January 10, 2009	4:30 p.m.	CBS
Divisional round	Arizona Cardinals	33–13	Carolina Panthers	January 10, 2009	8:00 p.m.	Fox
Divisional round	Philadelphia Eagles	23–11	New York Giants	January 11, 2009	1:00 p.m.	Fox
Divisional round	San Diego Chargers	24–35	Pittsburgh Steelers	January 11, 2009	4:30 p.m.	CBS
Conference championships	Philadelphia Eagles	25–32	Arizona Cardinals	January 18, 2009	3:00 p.m.	Fox
Conference championships	Baltimore Ravens	14–23	Pittsburgh Steelers	January 18, 2009	6:30 p.m.	CBS
Super Bowl XLIII Raymond James Stadium Tampa, Florida	Pittsburgh Steelers	27–23	Arizona Cardinals	February 1, 2009	6:30 p.m.	NBC

== Wild-card round ==
=== Saturday, January 3, 2009 ===
==== NFC: Arizona Cardinals 30, Atlanta Falcons 24 ====
Atlanta Falcons vs. Arizona Cardinals – Game summary

Quarter	1	2	3	4	Total
Falcons	0	17	0	7	24
Cardinals	7	7	14	2	30

at University of Phoenix Stadium, Glendale, Arizona

- Game time: 4:30 p.m. EST/2:30 p.m. MST
- Game weather: Played with roof closed, retractable roof stadium
- Game attendance: 62,848
- Referee: John Parry
- TV announcers (NBC): Tom Hammond (play-by-play), Cris Collinsworth (color commentator), and Tiki Barber (sideline reporter)

Game information

First quarter

- ARI – Larry Fitzgerald 42-yard pass from Kurt Warner (Neil Rackers kick), 10:28. Cardinals 7–0. Drive: 4 plays, 63 yards, 2:03.

Second quarter

- ATL – Jason Elam 30-yard field goal, 10:00. Cardinals 7–3. Drive: 14 plays, 80 yards, 7:31.
- ARI – Anquan Boldin 71-yard pass from Kurt Warner (Neil Rackers kick), 8:58. Cardinals 14–3. Drive: 3 plays, 72 yards, 1:02.
- ATL – Michael Turner 7-yard run (Jason Elam kick), 2:55. Cardinals 14–10. Drive: 14 plays, 77 yards, 6:03.
- ATL – Justin Peelle 2-yard pass from Matt Ryan (Jason Elam kick), 0:23. Falcons 17–14. Drive: 6 plays, 23 yards, 1:40.

Third quarter

- ARI – Antrel Rolle 27-yard fumble return (Neil Rackers kick), 14:08. Cardinals 21–17.
- ARI – Tim Hightower 4-yard run (Neil Rackers kick), 2:48. Cardinals 28–17. Drive: 14 plays, 76 yards, 7:43.

Fourth quarter

- ARI – Matt Ryan sacked in end zone by Antonio Smith for a safety, 12:37. Cardinals 30–17.
- ATL – Roddy White 5-yard pass from Matt Ryan (Jason Elam kick), 4:15. Cardinals 30–24. Drive: 9 plays, 58 yards, 3:36.

Top passers

- ATL – Matt Ryan – 26/40, 199 yards, 2 TD, 2 INT
- ARI – Kurt Warner – 19/32, 271 yards, 2 TD, INT

Top rushers

- ATL – Michael Turner – 18 rushes, 42 yards, TD
- ARI – Edgerrin James – 16 rushes, 73 yards

Top receivers

- ATL – Roddy White – 11 receptions, 84 yards, TD
- ARI – Larry Fitzgerald – 6 receptions, 101 yards, TD

Playing in their first playoff game at home since 1947 and first playoff game in University of Phoenix Stadium, Arizona outgained the Falcons in total yards 357–250 and forced three turnovers. Atlanta running back Michael Turner, who rushed for 1,699 yards during the season, was held to 42 yards on 18 carries.

One minute into the game, Atlanta receiver Harry Douglas gave his team a scoring opportunity by returning a punt 21 yards to the Cardinals 48-yard line. But two plays later, rookie quarterback Matt Ryan's pass was intercepted by Ralph Brown. The Cardinals offense started off their ensuing drive with three runs for 21 yards by Edgerrin James, and then took the lead over the Falcons with a 42-yard touchdown pass from Kurt Warner to Larry Fitzgerald on a flea flicker play.

In the second quarter, Ryan led Atlanta 80 yards to the Cardinals 12-yard line where Jason Elam finished the drive with a 30-yard field goal to cut the score to 7–3. But three plays after the kickoff, Warner threw a short pass to receiver Anquan Boldin, who caught the ball and cut away from Lawyer Milloy, taking off down the left sideline for a 71-yard touchdown reception to give his team a 14–3 lead.

Atlanta responded with touchdowns on their next two drives to take the lead before halftime. First, Ryan threw for 67 yards on a 77-yard drive that ended with Turner's 7-yard touchdown run. Then, Chevis Jackson intercepted a pass from Warner on the Cardinals 23-yard line. Five plays later, Ryan threw a 2-yard touchdown pass to tight end Justin Peelle, giving Atlanta a 17–14 lead with 23 seconds left in the second quarter.

However, Arizona would score 16 unanswered points in the second half. Three plays after the second half kickoff, Darnell Dockett burst up the middle on a running play, knocking the ball out of Ryan's hands before he could hand it off. Antrel Rolle (who was blitzing on the play) snagged the ball out of midair and returned it 21 yards for a touchdown. Then following two Atlanta punts and a missed 51-yard field goal by Neil Rackers, Arizona running back Tim Hightower finished a 76-yard drive with a 4-yard touchdown run, making the score 28–17. Early in the fourth quarter, the Cardinals increased their lead to 30–17 when defensive end Antonio Smith sacked Ryan in the end zone for a safety.

With 4:14 left in the game, Atlanta managed to get back within one touchdown with a 5-yard touchdown pass from Ryan to Roddy White. But with the aid of a key 24-yard reception by reserve tight end Stephen Spach (who caught only two passes for 15 yards during the season) on third down and 16, the Cardinals managed to run out the rest of the clock.

This was the first postseason meeting between the Falcons and Cardinals.

==== AFC: San Diego Chargers 23, Indianapolis Colts 17 (OT) ====
Indianapolis Colts vs. San Diego Chargers – Game summary

Quarter	1	2	3	4	OT	Total
Colts	7	3	7	0	0	17
Chargers	0	14	0	3	6	23

at Qualcomm Stadium, San Diego, California

- Game time: 8:15 p.m. EST/5:15 p.m. PST
- Game weather: 53 °F (12 °C), cloudy
- Game attendance: 68,082
- Referee: Ron Winter
- TV announcers (NBC): Al Michaels (play-by-play), John Madden (color commentator), and Andrea Kremer (sideline reporter)

Game information

First quarter

- IND – Joseph Addai 1-yard run (Adam Vinatieri kick), 2:59. Colts 7–0. Drive: 9 plays, 81 yards, 5:02.

Second quarter

- SD – LaDainian Tomlinson 3-yard run (Nate Kaeding kick), 10:15. Tied 7–7. Drive: 4 plays, 44 yards, 2:18.
- IND – Adam Vinatieri 43-yard field goal, 6:46. Colts 10–7. Drive: 8 plays, 42 yards, 3:29.
- SD – Darren Sproles 9-yard run (Nate Kaeding kick), 0:42. Chargers 14–10. Drive: 6 plays, 45 yards, 2:19.

Third quarter

- IND – Reggie Wayne 72-yard pass from Peyton Manning (Adam Vinatieri kick), 8:10. Colts 17–14. Drive: 5 plays, 91 yards, 1:32.

Fourth quarter

- SD – Nate Kaeding 26-yard field goal, 0:31. Tied 17–17. Drive: 7 plays, 30 yards, 1:15.

Overtime

- SD – Darren Sproles 22-yard run, 8:40. Chargers 23–17. Drive: 11 plays, 75 yards, 6:20.

Top passers

- IND – Peyton Manning – 25/42, 310 yards, TD
- SD – Philip Rivers – 20/36, 217 yards, INT

Top rushers

- IND – Joseph Addai – 16 rushes, 44 yards, TD
- SD – Darren Sproles – 22 rushes, 105 yards, 2 TD

Top receivers

- IND – Reggie Wayne – 4 receptions, 129 yards, TD
- SD – Antonio Gates – 8 receptions, 87 yards

Chargers running back Darren Sproles had 328 all-purpose yards (105 rushing, 45 receiving, 106 kickoff return yards, 72 yards on three punt returns), the third highest total in playoff history, and two touchdowns, including the game winning score in overtime.

Late in the first quarter, three receptions by Colts receiver Anthony Gonzalez for 59 yards set up a 1-yard touchdown run by Joseph Addai, putting Indianapolis on the board. In the second quarter, an 18-yard punt return by Sproles gave the Chargers good field position on the Colts 44-yard line. A few plays later, Philip Rivers' 30-yard completion to tight end Antonio Gates set up a 1-yard touchdown run by LaDainian Tomlinson to tie the game. But two more receptions by Gonzalez, for gains of 20 and 11 yards, led to an Adam Vinatieri field goal.

After an exchange of punts, Hunter Smith's 34-yard punt from his own 11-yard line gave San Diego the ball on the Colts 45. Five plays later, Sproles scored on a 9-yard touchdown run, giving his team a 14–10 halftime lead.

Midway into the third quarter, Indianapolis quarterback Peyton Manning managed to hurry his offense onto the line of scrimmage for a play while San Diego's defense was making substitutions. As a result, receiver Reggie Wayne ran past cornerback Antonio Cromartie (who didn't even realize the play had started), caught a pass from Manning, and took off for a 72-yard touchdown catch, retaking the lead for the Colts at 17–14. This would be the last score from both teams until late in the fourth quarter. San Diego responded on their ensuing drive by moving the ball to the Colts 9-yard line. But Sproles fumbled the ball into the end zone while being tackled by Tim Jennings and defensive tackle Raheem Brock recovered it for a touchback.

With under three minutes left in the game, Mike Scifres's 52-yard punt pinned the Colts back at their own 1-yard line. The Colts managed to get away from their own end zone with their first two plays, but on third down and two, linebacker Tim Dobbins drove them back to the 1 by sacking Manning for an 8-yard loss. Sproles then returned the ensuing punt 26 yards to the Colts 38-yard line. Following two receptions by Gates for 22 yards and an 8-yard run by Sproles, Nate Kaeding's field goal tied the game with 31 seconds left, sending it into sudden death.

In overtime, the Chargers won the coin toss and drove for the winning score, aided by two key penalties against the Colts defense. First Sproles returned the kickoff 31 yards to his own 25-yard line, and two plays later he caught a 13-yard pass on third down and 11. Six plays later from the Indianapolis 40-yard line, Jennings was called for defensive holding while trying to cover Chris Chambers on a third down play, giving the Chargers a first down. On the next play, a 15-yard facemask penalty on Clint Session moved the ball to the 20. Sproles was tackled for a 2-yard loss on the next play, but after that he ran 22 yards for a game-winning touchdown to win the game for San Diego.

This would be the Chargers' last playoff win until the 2013 NFL playoffs & last home playoff win for the Chargers in San Diego.

This was the third postseason meeting between the Colts and Chargers, and the second consecutive postseason meeting. Both teams have split the previous two meetings. San Diego won the previous meeting 28–24 in the 2007 AFC Divisional playoffs.

=== Sunday, January 4, 2009 ===
==== AFC: Baltimore Ravens 27, Miami Dolphins 9 ====
Baltimore Ravens vs. Miami Dolphins – Game summary

Quarter	1	2	3	4	Total
Ravens	3	10	7	7	27
Dolphins	3	0	0	6	9

at Dolphin Stadium, Miami Gardens, Florida

- Game time: 1:00 p.m. EST
- Game weather: 79 °F (26 °C), cloudy
- Game attendance: 74,240
- Referee: Ed Hochuli
- TV announcers (CBS): Jim Nantz (play-by-play) and Phil Simms (color commentator)

Game information

First quarter

- MIA – Dan Carpenter 19-yard field goal, 8:17. Dolphins 3–0. Drive: 8 plays, 50 yards, 4:15.
- BAL – Matt Stover 23-yard field goal, 2:47. Tied 3–3. Drive: 11 plays, 59 yards, 5:30.

Second quarter

- BAL – Ed Reed 64-yard interception return (Matt Stover kick), 2:30. Ravens 10–3.
- BAL – Matt Stover 31-yard field goal, 0:16. Ravens 13–3. Drive: 7 plays, 46 yards, 1:21.

Third quarter

- BAL – Le'Ron McClain 8-yard run (Matt Stover kick), 7:33. Ravens 20–3. Drive: 4 plays, 19 yards, 2:09.

Fourth quarter

- MIA – Ronnie Brown 2-yard pass from Chad Pennington (kick blocked), 13:09. Ravens 20–9. Drive: 5 plays, 74 yards, 1:51.
- BAL – Joe Flacco 5-yard run (Matt Stover kick), 3:53. Ravens 27–9. Drive: 8 plays, 71 yards, 3:44.

Top passers

- BAL – Joe Flacco – 9/23, 135 yards
- MIA – Chad Pennington – 25/38, 252 yards, TD, 4 INT

Top rushers

- BAL – Le'Ron McClain – 19 rushes, 75 yards, TD
- MIA – Ronnie Brown – 12 rushes, 19 yards

Top receivers

- BAL – Derrick Mason – 4 receptions, 71 yards
- MIA – Ronnie Brown – 6 receptions, 43 yards, TD

The game featured a Dolphins offense which had an NFL-low 13 giveaways against a Ravens defense that led the league in takeaways with 34. The Ravens defense ended up triumphant, forcing five turnovers en route to victory.

On the game's opening drive, Baltimore fullback Le'Ron McClain fumbled which linebacker Joey Porter recovered and returned to midfield. Several plays later, Miami advanced to the Ravens 1-yard line, but was unable to get into the end zone with two consecutive plays and ended up settling for a Dan Carpenter field goal to take a 3–0 lead. Baltimore responded with a drive to the Dolphins 5-yard line, featuring a 31-yard reception by tight end Todd Heap and scored with Matt Stover's 23-yard field goal to tie the game.

Midway through the second quarter, Ravens safety Ed Reed intercepted a pass from Chad Pennington and returned it 64 yards for a touchdown. Then after forcing a punt, Joe Flacco's 31-yard completion to Derrick Mason set up Stover's second field goal to give the Ravens a 13–3 halftime lead.

Miami's misfortunes continued in the second half. On their first drive of the second half, Pennington threw his third interception of the game. Then after a punt, Dolphins running back Patrick Cobbs fumbled while being tackled by Marques Douglas and linebacker Terrell Suggs recovered it on Miami's 19-yard line. Three plays later, McClain scored on an 8-yard touchdown run to make it 20–3. The Dolphins responded with a drive to the Ravens 13-yard line, only to lose the ball on Pennington's fourth interception of the game, and his second to Reed.

Early in the fourth quarter, Pennington's 45-yard completion to Davone Bess set up his 2-yard touchdown pass to Ronnie Brown, cutting the score to 20–9 after Frank Walker blocked the extra point attempt. But the Ravens defense shut out Miami for the rest of the game. Meanwhile, a 48-yard run by Willis McGahee set up a 5-yard touchdown by Flacco, making the final score 27–9.

This would be the Dolphins' last playoff appearance until the 2016 NFL playoffs, and their most recent home playoff game.

This marked the second postseason meeting between the Ravens and Dolphins, with Baltimore winning their prior meeting 20–3 in the 2001 AFC Wild Card playoffs.

==== NFC: Philadelphia Eagles 26, Minnesota Vikings 14 ====
Philadelphia Eagles vs. Minnesota Vikings – Game summary

Quarter	1	2	3	4	Total
Eagles	6	10	0	10	26
Vikings	0	14	0	0	14

at Hubert H. Humphrey Metrodome, Minneapolis, Minnesota

- Game time: 4:45 p.m. EST/3:45 p.m. CST
- Game weather: Played indoors, domed stadium
- Game attendance: 61,746
- Referee: Tony Corrente
- TV announcers (Fox): Joe Buck (play-by-play), Troy Aikman (color commentator), Pam Oliver, and Chris Myers (sideline reporters)

Game information

First quarter

- PHI – David Akers 43-yard field goal, 6:44. Eagles 3–0. Drive: 4 plays, 1 yard, 1:38.
- PHI – David Akers 51-yard field goal, 0:00. Eagles 6–0. Drive: 6 plays, 42 yards, 2:36.

Second quarter

- MIN – Adrian Peterson 40-yard run (Ryan Longwell kick), 11:05. Vikings 7–6. Drive: 8 plays, 78 yards, 3:55.
- PHI – David Akers 31-yard field goal, 7:29. Eagles 9–7. Drive: 9 plays, 59 yards, 3:36.
- PHI – Asante Samuel 43-yard interception return (David Akers kick), 6:34. Eagles 16–7.
- MIN – Adrian Peterson 3-yard run (Ryan Longwell kick), 1:51. Eagles 16–14. Drive: 9 plays, 64 yards, 4:43.

Third quarter

- None.

Fourth quarter

- PHI – Brian Westbrook 71-yard pass from Donovan McNabb (David Akers kick), 6:37. Eagles 23–14. Drive: 1 play, 71 yards, 0:16.
- PHI – David Akers 45-yard field goal, 1:55. Eagles 26–14. Drive: 6 plays, 20 yards, 0:54.

Top passers

- PHI – Donovan McNabb – 23/34, 300 yards, TD, INT
- MIN – Tarvaris Jackson – 15/35, 164 yards, INT

Top rushers

- PHI – Brian Westbrook – 20 rushes, 38 yards
- MIN – Adrian Peterson – 20 rushes, 83 yards, 2 TD

Top receivers

- PHI – Brian Westbrook – 3 receptions, 83 yards, TD
- MIN – Bernard Berrian – 2 receptions, 36 yards

Brian Westbrook's 71-yard touchdown reception in the second half gave the Eagles a two-score lead they never relinquished. Philadelphia's special teams unit also played a key role in their victory, as David Akers kicked four field goals, while DeSean Jackson returned five punts for a franchise playoff record 106 yards.

Early in the first quarter, Jackson's 62-yard punt return set up a field goal from Akers. Then after a punt, Donovan McNabb's 27-yard completion to Correll Buckhalter set up a 51-yard field goal by Akers on the last play of the quarter, making it 6–0. But Minnesota took the lead on their next drive with a 40-yard touchdown run from Adrian Peterson.

However, this turned out to be the only lead the Vikings would have for the entire game, and it would be short-lived. First, a 34-yard reception by Jackson set up Akers' third field goal. Then on Minnesota's next drive, cornerback Asante Samuel intercepted a pass from Tarvaris Jackson and returned it 44 yards for a touchdown, giving the Eagles a 16–7 lead.

With less than two minutes left in the first half, Peterson scored his second touchdown on a 3-yard run to cut the deficit to 16–14. But after a scoreless third quarter, Westbrook's 71-yard touchdown reception put the Eagles back up by nine points. Then with less than three minutes left in the game, a low snap by center Matt Birk in shotgun formation bounced off Tarvaris Jackson's foot and was recovered by Eagles defensive end Juqua Parker. Five plays later, Akers kicked his fourth field goal, this one from 45 yards, to put the game away.

This was the third postseason meeting between the Eagles and Vikings, with Philadelphia winning both prior meetings, including 27–14 in the 2004 NFC Divisional playoffs.

== Divisional round ==
=== Saturday, January 10, 2009 ===
==== AFC: Baltimore Ravens 13, Tennessee Titans 10 ====
Baltimore Ravens vs. Tennessee Titans – Game summary

Quarter	1	2	3	4	Total
Ravens	7	0	0	6	13
Titans	7	0	0	3	10

at LP Field, Nashville, Tennessee

- Game time: 4:30 p.m. EST/3:30 p.m. CST
- Game weather: 53 °F (12 °C), cloudy
- Game attendance: 69,143
- Referee: Terry McAulay
- TV announcers (CBS): Greg Gumbel (play-by-play) and Dan Dierdorf (color commentator)

Game information

First quarter

- TEN – Chris Johnson 8-yard run (Rob Bironas kick), 4:38. Titans 7–0. Drive: 6 plays, 65 yards, 3:31.
- BAL – Derrick Mason 48-yard pass from Joe Flacco (Matt Stover kick), 1:20. Tied 7–7. Drive: 8 plays, 80 yards, 3:18.

Second quarter

- None.

Third quarter

- None.

Fourth quarter

- BAL – Matt Stover 21-yard field goal, 14:10. Ravens 10–7. Drive: 6 plays, 38 yards, 2:36.
- TEN – Rob Bironas 27-yard field goal, 4:23. Tied 10–10. Drive: 6 plays, 32 yards, 3:00.
- BAL – Matt Stover 43-yard field goal, 0:53. Ravens 13–10. Drive: 9 plays, 51 yards, 3:30.

Top passers

- BAL – Joe Flacco – 11/22, 161 yards, TD
- TEN – Kerry Collins – 26/42, 281 yards, INT

Top rushers

- BAL – Willis McGahee – 12 rushes, 32 yards
- TEN – Chris Johnson – 11 rushes, 72 yards, TD

Top receivers

- BAL – Derrick Mason – 5 receptions, 78 yards, TD
- TEN – Justin Gage – 10 receptions, 135 yards

Matt Stover kicked a 43-yard field goal with 57 seconds remaining to send the Ravens into the AFC Championship Game at the expense of the Titans, as quarterback Joe Flacco became the first rookie quarterback to win two playoff games in a single postseason. Tennessee turned the ball over three times, which proved to be the difference between the two teams, as Baltimore never gave the ball away.

The Titans took the lead on their second drive of the game with Kerry Collins completing a 28-yard pass to rookie running back Chris Johnson and a 20-yarder to Justin Gage before Johnson finished the drive with an 8-yard touchdown run. But the Ravens answered back with Flacco's 48-yard touchdown pass to former Titan Derrick Mason.

Early in the second quarter, Tennessee drove to the Ravens 25-yard line, only to turn the ball over on downs due to a fumbled snap on a fourth down conversion attempt. Then after forcing a punt, their drive to the Ravens 32-yard line also ended with no points when a pass from Collins was picked off by former Titan Samari Rolle. Following another punt, the Titans moved the ball into scoring range for the third time in a row, this time driving to the Baltimore 22. But once again they came up empty after LenDale White's fumble was recovered by Ravens safety Jim Leonhard with 25 seconds left in the half.

In the second half, a 29-yard punt return by Leonhard and a 37-yard reception by Mark Clayton set up a Stover field goal to take a 10–7 lead. Meanwhile, the Titans failed to score again, as Rob Bironas missed a 51-yard field goal after Stover's field goal, and Ravens cornerback Fabian Washington forced and recovered a fumble from tight end Alge Crumpler on Baltimore's 1-yard line.

However, the Ravens were unable to gain any yards with their ensuing drive and Tennessee got the ball back with great field position at the Ravens 42-yard line. This time, they managed to drive to the 10-yard line and score with a Bironas field goal to tie the game at 10.

Two plays after the ensuing kickoff, Baltimore faced third down and 2. On the next play, the play clock appeared to expire before the snap, but no penalty flag was thrown and Flacco ended up completing a 23-yard pass to Todd Heap. Five plays later, Stover's 43-yard field goal gave the Ravens a 13–10 lead with 53 seconds left. Baltimore's defense then sealed the victory by forcing Tennessee to turn the ball over on downs on their own 40-yard line. This would be the last playoff appearance for the Titans until the 2017 Season.

This was the third postseason meeting between the Ravens and Titans. Both teams split the prior two meetings with the victor winning on the road. Tennessee won the most recent meeting 20–17 in the 2003 AFC Wild Card playoffs.

==== NFC: Arizona Cardinals 33, Carolina Panthers 13 ====
Arizona Cardinals vs. Carolina Panthers – Game summary

Quarter	1	2	3	4	Total
Cardinals	14	13	3	3	33
Panthers	7	0	0	6	13

at Bank of America Stadium, Charlotte, North Carolina

- Game time: 8:15 p.m. EST
- Game weather: 45 °F (7 °C), showers
- Game attendance: 73,695
- Referee: Gene Steratore
- TV announcers (Fox): Kenny Albert (play-by-play), Daryl Johnston (color commentator), and Tony Siragusa (sideline reporter)

Game information

First quarter

- CAR – Jonathan Stewart 9-yard run (John Kasay kick), 11:56. Panthers 7–0. Drive: 5 plays, 50 yards, 3:04.
- ARI – Tim Hightower 3-yard pass from Kurt Warner (Neil Rackers kick), 2:43. Tied 7–7. Drive: 6 plays, 60 yards, 3:39.
- ARI – Edgerrin James 4-yard run (Neil Rackers kick), 1:47. Cardinals 14–7. Drive: 2 plays, 13 yards, 0:50.

Second quarter

- ARI – Neil Rackers 49-yard field goal, 10:16. Cardinals 17–7. Drive: 9 plays, 49 yards, 4:32.
- ARI – Neil Rackers 30-yard field goal, 5:28. Cardinals 20–7. Drive: 8 plays, 49 yards, 3:37.
- ARI – Larry Fitzgerald 29-yard pass from Kurt Warner (Neil Rackers kick), 3:32. Cardinals 27–7. Drive: 3 plays, 44 yards, 1:39.

Third quarter

- ARI – Neil Rackers 33-yard field goal, 4:40. Cardinals 30–7. Drive: 6 plays, 11 yards, 3:12.

Fourth quarter

- ARI – Neil Rackers 20-yard field goal, 3:10. Cardinals 33–7. Drive: 13 plays, 48 yards, 7:37.
- CAR – Steve Smith 8-yard pass from Jake Delhomme (pass failed), 0:50. Cardinals 33–13. Drive: 10 plays, 79 yards, 2:20.

Top passers

- ARI – Kurt Warner – 21/32, 220 yards, 2 TD, INT
- CAR – Jake Delhomme – 17/34, 205 yards, TD, 5 INT

Top rushers

- ARI – Tim Hightower – 17 rushes, 76 yards
- CAR – DeAngelo Williams – 12 rushes, 63 yards

Top receivers

- ARI – Larry Fitzgerald – 8 receptions, 166 yards, TD
- CAR – Muhsin Muhammad – 5 receptions, 55 yards

Jake Delhomme was intercepted five times and lost a fumble as the Cardinals reached the NFC Championship Game for the first time in their history, winning for the first time in the Eastern Time Zone all season, and not only handing the Panthers their first home defeat of the season, but also handing them their first playoff home defeat. Delhomme, playing on his 34th birthday, became the first player to have five picks in the playoffs since Rich Gannon in Super Bowl XXXVII, with Dominique Rodgers-Cromartie, Gerald Hayes, Antrel Rolle, Ralph Brown, and Roderick Hood all hauling the ball in. Meanwhile, Cardinals receiver Larry Fitzgerald set a franchise postseason record with 166 yards on eight receptions including a touchdown.

Panthers receiver Mark Jones gave his team good field position on their first drive, returning the opening kickoff 39 yards to the Arizona 48-yard line. A few plays later a 31-yard burst from DeAngelo Williams set up a 9-yard touchdown run by Jonathan Stewart giving Carolina a 7–0 lead. But this would be short lived as the Cardinals would respond with 33 unanswered points.

After an exchange of punts, Kurt Warner's 48-yard completion to Fitzgerald set up a 3-yard touchdown run by Tim Hightower. Then on the first play of the Panthers next drive, Cardinals defensive end Antonio Smith knocked the ball out of Delhomme's hand as he was about to throw and recovered it on the Carolina 13-yard line. One play later, Edgerrin James' 4-yard touchdown run gave Arizona a 14–7 lead.

Later on, a 45-yard pass interference penalty on Rolle gave the Panthers the ball on the Arizona 13-yard line. But on the first play of the second quarter, Delhomme's pass was intercepted by Rodgers-Cromartie, who returned the ball 20 yards to the 20-yard line. Arizona then drove to the Panthers 31-yard line where Neil Rackers made a 49-yard field goal. Following a Carolina punt, two receptions by Fitzgerald for 42 yards set up another Rackers field goal. Then Hayes intercepted a pass from Delhomme, which led to another Arizona score, this one a 29-yard touchdown pass from Warner to Fitzgerald, making the score 27–7 by halftime.

The situation didn't get any better for the Panthers in the second half. Six minutes into the third quarter, Rolle's 46-yard interception return led to Rackers' third field goal. Then in the fourth quarter, Delhomme was intercepted on two consecutive drives. After the second one, the Cardinals executed 12 consecutive running plays with Hightower, gaining 48 yards and setting up Rackers' fourth field goal.

Carolina managed to respond with an 8-yard touchdown pass from Delhomme to Steve Smith, but by then there were only 53 seconds left in the game.

This was the first postseason meeting between the Cardinals and Panthers.

=== Sunday, January 11, 2009 ===
==== NFC: Philadelphia Eagles 23, New York Giants 11 ====
Philadelphia Eagles vs. New York Giants – Game summary

Quarter	1	2	3	4	Total
Eagles	7	3	3	10	23
Giants	3	5	3	0	11

at Giants Stadium, East Rutherford, New Jersey

- Game time: 1:00 p.m. EST
- Game weather: 30 °F (−1 °C), partly cloudy
- Game attendance: 79,193
- Referee: Mike Carey
- TV announcers (Fox): Joe Buck (play-by-play), Troy Aikman (color commentator), Pam Oliver, and Chris Myers (sideline reporters)

Game information

First quarter

- NYG – John Carney 22-yard field goal, 9:59. Giants 3–0. Drive: 9 plays, 31 yards, 5:01.
- PHI – Donovan McNabb 1-yard run (David Akers kick), 5:58. Eagles 7–3. Drive: 3 plays, 2 yards, 1:32.

Second quarter

- NYG – Intentional grounding penalty on Donovan McNabb enforced in end zone for a safety, 12:34. Eagles 7–5.
- NYG – John Carney 34-yard field goal, 1:33. Giants 8–7. Drive: 7 plays, 63 yards, 2:25.
- PHI – David Akers 25-yard field goal, 0:00. Eagles 10–8. Drive: 12 plays, 68 yards, 1:33.

Third quarter

- NYG – John Carney 36-yard field goal, 12:33. Giants 11–10. Drive: 5 plays, 16 yards, 1:35.
- PHI – David Akers 35-yard field goal, 7:45. Eagles 13–11. Drive: 12 plays, 58 yards, 4:48.

Fourth quarter

- PHI – Brent Celek 1-yard pass from Donovan McNabb (David Akers kick), 14:56. Eagles 20–11. Drive: 10 plays, 63 yards, 4:24.
- PHI – David Akers 20-yard field goal, 3:58. Eagles 23–11. Drive: 6 plays, 46 yards, 2:30.

Top passers

- PHI – Donovan McNabb – 22/40, 217 yards, TD, 2 INT
- NYG – Eli Manning – 15/29, 169 yards, 2 INT

Top rushers

- PHI – Brian Westbrook – 18 rushes, 36 yards
- NYG – Brandon Jacobs – 19 rushes, 92 yards

Top receivers

- PHI – DeSean Jackson – 4 receptions, 81 yards
- NYG – Kevin Boss – 3 receptions, 52 yards

In what would turn out to be the final playoff game played at Giants Stadium, the Eagles defense forced three turnovers and only allowed the Giants to score three field goals despite five drives inside the Philadelphia 20-yard line. Meanwhile, Eagles kicker David Akers' three field goals gave him an NFL record 18 consecutive field goals in the postseason without a miss.

New York running back Ahmad Bradshaw returned the opening kickoff 65 yards, giving his team the ball on the Eagles 35-yard line. The Giants eventually drove to the 4-yard line, but ended up settling for a John Carney field goal to take a 3–0 lead. The Giants subsequently forced a punt, but on the first play of their next drive, Eli Manning's pass was intercepted by cornerback Asante Samuel and returned 25 yards to the Giants 2-yard line. A few plays later, quarterback Donovan McNabb gave his team a 7–3 lead with a 1-yard touchdown run.

Early in the second quarter, Jeff Feagles' 45-yard punt pinned the Eagles back at their own 5-yard line. One play later, McNabb committed an intentional grounding penalty in the end zone, giving New York a safety. Following the free kick, the Giants drove to the Philadelphia 28-yard line, but came up empty when Carney's 46-yard field goal attempt sailed wide right.

With just under four minutes left in the second quarter, Kevin Dockery intercepted a pass from McNabb on his own 20-yard line. Following a 25-yard run by Brandon Jacobs and Manning's 25-yard completion to tight end Kevin Boss, Carney kicked a 34-yard field goal to give New York a 1-point lead. But the Eagles responded with a 25-yard field goal from Akers as time expired in the half, making the score 10–8.

Early in the second half, New York defensive tackle Fred Robbins intercepted a pass from McNabb and returned it 17 yards to the Eagles 33-yard line, setting up Carney's third field goal to take an 11–10 lead. But McNabb led the Eagles back with four completions for 57 yards on their ensuing drive en route to a 35-yard field goal from Akers. After receiving the ensuing kickoff the Giants got a first down at the Philadelphia 30 thanks to a 34-yard over-the-shoulder catch by Domenik Hixon on third and 5. But the drive stalled and the Giants came up empty as Carney missed a second field goal try, this one from 47 yards. After the missed field goal, McNabb led the Eagles 63 yards in 10 plays and finished the drive with a 1-yard touchdown pass to reserve tight end Brent Celek on the first play of the fourth quarter, giving the Eagles a 20–11 lead.

The Eagles defense then went on to dominate the fourth quarter, forcing two turnovers on downs, an interception and a fumble. Meanwhile, DeSean Jackson's 48-yard reception set up Akers' third field goal, making the final score 23–11, the first time in NFL history a game has ended with that score.

For the second straight year, the No. 1 seed in the NFC lost in the divisional round as the Cowboys lost to the Giants in the 2007 playoffs. The top seed had advanced to the NFC Championship Game every year from 1988 to 2006. The Eagles also became the third No. 6 seed to advance to the conference championship game and first in the NFC.

This was the final playoff game at Giants Stadium, and the Eagles' last playoff victory until their Super Bowl winning 2017 season.

This was the fourth postseason meeting between the Eagles and Giants. New York won two of the prior three meetings. Philadelphia won 23–20 in the most recent meeting in the 2006 NFC Wild Card playoffs.

==== AFC: Pittsburgh Steelers 35, San Diego Chargers 24 ====
San Diego Chargers vs. Pittsburgh Steelers – Game summary

Quarter	1	2	3	4	Total
Chargers	7	3	0	14	24
Steelers	7	7	7	14	35

at Heinz Field, Pittsburgh, Pennsylvania

- Game time: 4:45 p.m. EST
- Game weather: 26 °F (−3 °C), light snow showers
- Game attendance: 63,899
- Referee: Bill Leavy
- TV announcers (CBS): Jim Nantz (play-by-play) and Phil Simms (color commentator)

Game information

First quarter

- SD – Vincent Jackson 41-yard pass from Philip Rivers (Nate Kaeding kick), 12:59. Chargers 7–0. Drive: 4 plays, 75 yards, 2:01.
- PIT – Santonio Holmes 67-yard punt return (Jeff Reed kick), 7:41. Tied 7–7.

Second quarter

- SD – Nate Kaeding 42-yard field goal, 1:56. Chargers 10–7. Drive: 7 plays, 20 yards, 3:09.
- PIT – Willie Parker 3-yard run (Jeff Reed kick), 0:40. Steelers 14–10. Drive: 7 plays, 66 yards, 1:16.

Third quarter

- PIT – Heath Miller 8-yard pass from Ben Roethlisberger (Jeff Reed kick), 7:04. Steelers 21–10. Drive: 13 plays, 77 yards, 7:56.

Fourth quarter

- PIT – Gary Russell 1-yard run (Jeff Reed kick), 12:52. Steelers 28–10. Drive: 2 plays, 49 yards, 0:49.
- SD – Legedu Naanee 4-yard pass from Philip Rivers (Nate Kaeding kick), 9:09. Steelers 28–17. Drive: 10 plays, 73 yards, 3:43.
- PIT – Willie Parker 16-yard run (Jeff Reed kick), 4:11. Steelers 35–17. Drive: 9 plays, 73 yards, 4:58.
- SD – Darren Sproles 62-yard pass from Philip Rivers (Nate Kaeding kick), 1:53. Steelers 35–24. Drive: 4 plays, 79 yards, 0:50.

Top passers

- SD – Philip Rivers – 21/35, 308 yards, 3 TD, INT
- PIT – Ben Roethlisberger – 17/26, 181 yards, TD

Top rushers

- SD – Darren Sproles – 11 rushes, 15 yards
- PIT – Willie Parker – 27 rushes, 146 yards, 2 TD

Top receivers

- SD – Darren Sproles – 5 receptions, 91 yards, TD
- PIT – Hines Ward – 4 receptions, 70 yards

Pittsburgh gained 342 yards, did not commit any turnovers, held the ball for 36:30, and scored a touchdown in every quarter to defeat the Chargers. Willie Parker led the Steelers offense with 147 rushing yards and two touchdowns.

However, the Chargers took the opening kickoff and scored with Philip Rivers' 48-yard touchdown pass to Vincent Jackson just two minutes into the game. Pittsburgh responded with a drive to the San Diego 34-yard line. On fourth down, rather than risk a long field goal attempt, they faked attempting to gain a first down and ran a surprise pooch punt with quarterback Ben Roethlisberger, who kicked the ball 25 yards to the San Diego 9-yard line. Following a three-and-out, Steelers receiver Santonio Holmes returned Mike Scifres' punt 65 yards for a touchdown to tie the game.

Late in the second quarter, Pittsburgh tried to fool the Chargers with another trick play, this one a fake punt with a direct snap to safety Ryan Clark. But the Chargers backup linebacker Antwan Applewhite tackled Clark for a 4-yard loss on the Steelers 44-yard line. Several plays later, Nate Kaeding's 42-yard field goal gave San Diego a 10–7 lead on the first play after the two-minute warning. But with less than one minute left, Roethlisberger's 41-yard completion to Hines Ward moved the ball to the Chargers 3-yard line. On the next play, Parker's 3-yard touchdown run gave the Steelers a 14–10 halftime lead.

Pittsburgh dominated the third quarter, starting it out with a 77-yard drive that ended with Roethlisberger's 8-yard touchdown pass to tight end Heath Miller. Meanwhile, their defense limited San Diego to just one play in the entire quarter, an interception by linebacker Larry Foote that negated a 63-yard kickoff return by Darren Sproles.

In the fourth quarter, San Diego managed to make a goal line stand, tackling fullback Carey Davis for no gain on fourth down and 1 on the Chargers 1-yard line. After taking over at their own 1-yard line, the Chargers appeared to escape the shadow of their own end zone when Rivers hit Jacob Hester with a pass for an 11-yard gain. But a 10-yard sack by LaMarr Woodley and two incompletions forced San Diego to punt from their own 2, and Holmes returned the ball six yards to the 49-yard line. One play later, a 44-yard pass interference penalty on Eric Weddle in the end zone moved the ball to the 1-yard line, and running back Gary Russell scored a 1-yard touchdown run on the next play, increasing Pittsburgh's lead to 28–10.

Rivers then led the Chargers 73 yards in 10 plays and finished the drive with a 4-yard touchdown pass to Legedu Naanee. But the Steelers stormed right back, with Parker rushing five times for 53 yards and finishing the drive with a 16-yard touchdown run. Following an exchange of punts, Rivers threw a 62-yard touchdown pass to Sproles, cutting the score to 35–24, but by then there was less than two minutes left in the game.

This was the third postseason meeting between the Chargers and Steelers, with San Diego winning both prior meeting in Pittsburgh, the most recent being 17–13 in the 1994 AFC Championship Game.

== Conference championships ==
=== Sunday, January 18, 2009 ===
For the first time since 1979, both #1 seeds failed to get to the conference championship round. Both #1 seeds had been defeated by #6 seeds in the divisional round, the first time that this has happened. The only other occurrence was two years later.

==== NFC: Arizona Cardinals 32, Philadelphia Eagles 25 ====
Philadelphia Eagles vs. Arizona Cardinals – Game summary

Quarter	1	2	3	4	Total
Eagles	3	3	13	6	25
Cardinals	7	17	0	8	32

at University of Phoenix Stadium, Glendale, Arizona

- Game time: 3:00 p.m. EST/1:00 p.m. MST
- Game weather: Played with roof closed, retractable roof stadium
- Game attendance: 70,650
- Referee: Walt Anderson
- TV announcers (Fox): Joe Buck (play-by-play), Troy Aikman (color commentator), Pam Oliver, and Chris Myers (sideline reporters)

Game information

First quarter

- ARI – Larry Fitzgerald 9-yard pass from Kurt Warner (Neil Rackers kick), 9:20. Cardinals 7–0. Drive: 9 plays, 80 yards, 5:40.
- PHI – David Akers 45-yard field goal, 4:43. Cardinals 7–3. Drive: 8 plays, 33 yards, 4:37.

Second quarter

- ARI – Larry Fitzgerald 62-yard pass from Kurt Warner (Neil Rackers kick), 13:19. Cardinals 14–3. Drive: 1 play, 62 yards, 0:11.
- PHI – David Akers 33-yard field goal, 9:02. Cardinals 14–6. Drive: 7 plays, 65 yards, 4:14.
- ARI – Larry Fitzgerald 1-yard pass from Kurt Warner (Neil Rackers kick), 3:06. Cardinals 21–6. Drive: 8 plays, 73 yards, 5:56.
- ARI – Neil Rackers 49-yard field goal, 0:00. Cardinals 24–6. Drive: 9 plays, 53 yards, 1:31.

Third quarter

- PHI – Brent Celek 6-yard pass from Donovan McNabb (David Akers kick), 4:08. Cardinals 24–13. Drive: 13 plays, 90 yards, 5:55.
- PHI – Brent Celek 31-yard pass from Donovan McNabb (kick failed), 0:49. Cardinals 24–19. Drive: 6 plays, 61 yards, 2:39.

Fourth quarter

- PHI – DeSean Jackson 62-yard pass from Donovan McNabb (pass failed), 10:45. Eagles 25–24. Drive: 4 plays, 86 yards, 2:15.
- ARI – Tim Hightower 8-yard pass from Kurt Warner (Ben Patrick pass from Kurt Warner), 2:53. Cardinals 32–25. Drive: 14 plays, 72 yards, 7:52.

Top passers

- PHI – Donovan McNabb – 28/47, 375 yards, 3 TD, INT
- ARI – Kurt Warner – 21/28, 279 yards, 4 TD

Top rushers

- PHI – Brian Westbrook – 12 rushes, 45 yards
- ARI – Edgerrin James – 16 rushes, 73 yards

Top receivers

- PHI – Kevin Curtis – 4 receptions, 122 yards
- ARI – Larry Fitzgerald – 9 receptions, 152 yards, 3 TD

Arizona built up an 18-point halftime lead, but had to fight off an Eagles comeback attempt to earn their third conference championship in franchise history. Arizona also became the second team to make it to the Super Bowl with a 9–7 record, joining the 1979 Los Angeles Rams. Arizona also became the first #4 seed to host a conference championship game. Until the 2021 season, this was the last time that any team seeded below #2 has hosted a conference championship game.

Arizona took the opening kickoff and stormed down the field with a 9-play, 80-yard drive. Edgerrin James rushed four times for 33 yards on the drive, while Kurt Warner completed all four of his passes for 44 yards, the last one a 9-yard touchdown pass to Larry Fitzgerald. Philadelphia responded on their ensuing possession, starting it off with a 21-yard scramble by Donovan McNabb to the Arizona 39-yard line and finishing it with a 45-yard field goal by David Akers.

Following a punt, McNabb threw an interception to Aaron Francisco, but DeSean Jackson forced Francisco to fumble the ball during the return and Eagles right tackle Jon Runyan recovered it. After the fumble, Philadelphia drove into scoring range, but they ended the drive with no points when Akers missed a 47-yard field goal attempt, ending his postseason record streak of consecutive field goals at 19. On the next play, Warner threw a 62-yard touchdown pass to Fitzgerald off of a double pass play, giving the Cardinals a 14–3 lead. It was the second time Arizona found pay-dirt on a trick play during the playoffs (after a flea flicker in the wild card game).

Two plays into the Eagles next drive, McNabb completed a 47-yard pass to Kevin Curtis on the Arizona 19-yard line. But Arizona halted the drive at the 15, forcing Philadelphia to settle for a 33-yard field goal from Akers. Then the Cardinals took the ensuing kickoff and stormed down the field for another score. First James rushed for 22 yards, then Tim Hightower ran for 5, and then Warner completed a 16-yard pass to J. J. Arrington at the Eagles 30-yard line. Following two more Warner completions for 22 yards, he finished the drive with his third touchdown pass to Fitzgerald, making the score 21–6.

After a Philadelphia punt, Warner led the Cardinals down the field again for more points. Starting with 1:31 left in the half, an unnecessary roughness penalty on Quintin Demps moved the ball to the Arizona 36. Then Warner completed a pair of passes to Jerheme Urban and Fitzgerald for 32 yards. A sack by linebacker Trent Cole pushed them out of field goal range, but on the next play, Warner's 13-yard completion to Anquan Boldin set up a 49-yard field goal by Neil Rackers, making the score 24–6 at halftime.

Philadelphia's defense made a major improvement in the third quarter, limiting Arizona to nine rushing yards, one completion, and no first downs. Meanwhile, the Eagles cut the score to 24–13 with a 90-yard scoring drive. The Eagles converted three third downs on the drive, including McNabb's 50-yard completion to Curtis on third and 19, and finished it off with a 6-yard touchdown reception by tight end Brent Celek. The Eagles quickly forced a punt on Arizona's ensuing possession, and Jackson returned it 13 yards to the Philadelphia 39-yard line. Five plays later, McNabb's threw a 31-yard touchdown pass to Celek. Rather than try to cut their deficit to three points, Philadelphia decided to kick the extra point, but Akers' kick was no good, keeping the score at 24–19. It was the first time Akers had missed an extra point all season.

Early in the fourth quarter, Philadelphia took their first lead of the game with McNabb's 62-yard touchdown pass to Jackson, giving his team a 1-point lead after the two-point conversion attempt failed. But the Cardinals responded with a 14-play, 74-yard drive to retake the lead for good, featuring a 6-yard run by Hightower on fourth down and 1 on the Eagles 49-yard line. Warner completed all five of his passes for 56 yards on the drive and finished it off with an 8-yard touchdown pass to Hightower with less than three minutes left. Then his 2-point conversion pass to Ben Patrick made the score 32–25. Finally, the Cardinals defense sealed the victory by forcing a turnover on downs at the Arizona 47-yard line. By the time Philadelphia got the ball back, only 10 seconds remained. In a desperate lateral play, Darnell Dockett intercepted Jackson's throw, ending the game.

Fitzgerald finished the game with nine receptions for 152 yards and three touchdowns. This gave him an NFL postseason record 419 total receiving yards in his three playoff games. McNabb's 375 passing yards and Warner's 145.7 passer rating were each third-highest recorded in the NFC championship game as of 2009. Both teams combined for an NFC postseason record 823 yards.

For the second time in five years, an all-Pennsylvania Super Bowl was denied. The Steelers lost the 2004 AFC Championship Game to the New England Patriots, who went on to win Super Bowl XXXIX over the Eagles 24–21.

This was the third postseason meeting between the Eagles and Cardinals. Both teams split the prior two meetings. The most recent ended with Philadelphia defeating the then-Chicago Cardinals 7–0 in the 1948 NFL Championship Game.

==== AFC: Pittsburgh Steelers 23, Baltimore Ravens 14 ====
Baltimore Ravens vs. Pittsburgh Steelers – Game summary

Quarter	1	2	3	4	Total
Ravens	0	7	0	7	14
Steelers	6	7	3	7	23

at Heinz Field, Pittsburgh, Pennsylvania

- Game time: 6:30 p.m. EST
- Game weather: 26 °F (−3 °C), cloudy
- Game attendance: 65,350
- Referee: Bill Carollo
- TV announcers (CBS): Jim Nantz (play-by-play), Phil Simms (color commentator), and Steve Tasker (sideline reporter)

Game information

First quarter

- PIT – Jeff Reed 34-yard field goal, 11:22. Steelers 3–0. Drive: 7 plays, 55 yards, 3:32.
- PIT – Jeff Reed 42-yard field goal, 6:11. Steelers 6–0. Drive: 7 plays, 11 yards, 1:11.

Second quarter

- PIT – Santonio Holmes 65-yard pass from Ben Roethlisberger (Jeff Reed kick), 13:58. Steelers 13–0. Drive: 3 plays, 66 yards, 1:02.
- BAL – Willis McGahee 3-yard run (Matt Stover kick), 2:40. Steelers 13–7. Drive: 3 plays, 4 yards, 0:57.

Third quarter

- PIT – Jeff Reed 46-yard field goal, 3:38. Steelers 16–7. Drive: 11 plays, 46 yards, 5:29.

Fourth quarter

- BAL – Willis McGahee 1-yard run (Matt Stover kick), 9:29. Steelers 16–14. Drive: 6 plays, 48 yards, 3:09.
- PIT – Troy Polamalu 40-yard interception return (Jeff Reed kick), 4:24. Steelers 23–14.

Top passers

- BAL – Joe Flacco – 13/30, 141 yards, 3 INT
- PIT – Ben Roethlisberger – 16/33, 255 yards, TD

Top rushers

- BAL – Willis McGahee – 20 rushes, 60 yards, 2 TD
- PIT – Willie Parker – 24 rushes, 47 yards

Top receivers

- BAL – Ray Rice – 3 receptions, 43 yards
- PIT – Santonio Holmes – 2 receptions, 70 yards, TD

Pittsburgh held the Ravens to 184 yards and forced five turnovers, including three in the last 3:13 of the game, en route to their seventh Super Bowl appearance in franchise history. Baltimore became the third consecutive road team (Pittsburgh was the last to win it), and the 11th out of 19 since the 1990 season, to lose the AFC title game and was thus unable to duplicate their success in 2000 as a wild card team advancing to the Super Bowl.

On the first drive of the game, Ben Roethlisberger's 45-yard completion to Hines Ward set up a 34-yard field goal by Jeff Reed. Later in the first quarter, Deshea Townsend intercepted a pass from Joe Flacco and returned it to the Ravens 35-yard line. A few plays later, Santonio Holmes appeared to catch a 23-yard pass on the 1, but it was overruled by a Baltimore replay challenge and they ended up settling for a 42-yard field goal to make the score 6–0. Later on, the Ravens got a scoring opportunity when linebacker Ray Lewis forced a fumble from Pittsburgh running back Willie Parker and safety Jim Leonhard recovered it on the Steelers 43-yard line. But Baltimore turned the ball over on downs after failing to convert a first down on third and fourth down and 1.

Pittsburgh increased their lead to 13–0 on the second play of the second quarter with Roethlisberger's 65-yard touchdown pass to Holmes. But after several punts, a 45-yard punt return from Leonhard gave the Ravens a first down on the Pittsburgh 17-yard line. Two plays later, Willis McGahee scored a 3-yard touchdown run. Following an exchange of punts, Holmes returned a punt 25 yards to midfield. But the Steelers blew two chances to score before halftime. First, receiver Limas Sweed dropped a wide open pass near the end zone and the team ended up punting. However, a roughing the punter penalty allowed the Steelers to retain possession. Heath Miller's 14-yard reception on the next play moved the ball to the Ravens 21-yard line with 23 seconds left in the half and no timeouts left. Pittsburgh decided to run a few more plays before attempting a field goal, but Mewelde Moore's 8-yard reception in the middle of the field took too much time off the clock, and Pittsburgh could not spike the ball before time in the half expired.

Midway through the third quarter, Pittsburgh drove 51 yards and scored with Reed's third field goal of the game, making the score 16–7. But in the fourth quarter, the Ravens took advantage of another key special teams play when Mitch Berger's punt went just 21 yards to the Baltimore 42-yard line. Flacco then led the Ravens 58 yards, completing all four of his passes for 44 yards on the way to a 1-yard touchdown run by McGahee, cutting their deficit to 16–14. Baltimore's defense subsequently forced a punt and got the ball back on their own 14-yard line with just over six minutes left in the game. But four plays later, safety Troy Polamalu intercepted a pass from Flacco, ran all the way across the field, and took off for a 40-yard touchdown return, making the score 23–14. Pittsburgh then put the game away by forcing two more turnovers on the Ravens next two drives. First, a hit by Ryan Clark on McGahee forced a fumble that was recovered by linebacker Lawrence Timmons; McGahee suffered a concussion and was removed from the field on a stretcher. Then after a punt, Tyrone Carter intercepted a pass from Flacco with less than a minute left in the game.

This was the second postseason meeting between the Ravens and Steelers. Pittsburgh won the only prior meeting 27–10 in the 2001 AFC Divisional playoffs.

== Super Bowl XLIII: Pittsburgh Steelers 27, Arizona Cardinals 23 ==
Super Bowl XLIII – Pittsburgh Steelers vs. Arizona Cardinals – Game summary

Quarter	1	2	3	4	Total
Steelers (AFC)	3	14	3	7	27
Cardinals (NFC)	0	7	0	16	23

at Raymond James Stadium, Tampa, Florida

- Date: February 1, 2009
- Game time: 6:31 p.m. EST
- Game weather: 66 °F (19 °C), mostly cloudy
- Game attendance: 70,774
- Referee: Terry McAulay
- TV announcers (NBC): Al Michaels (play-by-play), John Madden (color commentator), Andrea Kremer, and Alex Flanagan (sideline reporters)
- Recap

Game information

First quarter

- PIT – Jeff Reed 18-yard field goal, 9:45. Steelers 3–0. Drive: 9 plays, 71 yards, 5:15.

Second quarter

- PIT – Gary Russell 1-yard run (Jeff Reed kick), 14:01. Steelers 10–0. Drive: 11 plays, 69 yards, 7:12.
- ARI – Ben Patrick 1-yard pass from Kurt Warner (Neil Rackers kick), 8:34. Steelers 10–7. Drive: 9 plays, 83 yards, 5:27.
- PIT – James Harrison 100-yard interception return (Jeff Reed kick), 0:00. Steelers 17–7.

Third quarter

- PIT – Jeff Reed 21-yard field goal, 2:11. Steelers 20–7. Drive: 16 plays, 79 yards, 8:39.

Fourth quarter

- ARI – Larry Fitzgerald 1-yard pass from Kurt Warner (Neil Rackers kick), 7:33. Steelers 20–14. Drive: 8 plays, 87 yards, 3:57.
- ARI – Safety, Justin Hartwig penalized for holding in the end zone, 2:58. Steelers 20–16.
- ARI – Larry Fitzgerald 64-yard pass from Kurt Warner (Neil Rackers kick), 2:37. Cardinals 23–20. Drive: 2 plays, 64 yards, 0:21.
- PIT – Santonio Holmes 6-yard pass from Ben Roethlisberger (Jeff Reed kick), 0:35. Steelers 27–23. Drive: 8 plays, 78 yards, 2:02.

Top passers

- PIT – Ben Roethlisberger – 21/30, 256 yards, TD, INT
- ARI – Kurt Warner – 31/43, 377 yards, 3 TD, INT

Top rushers

- PIT – Willie Parker – 19 rushes, 53 yards
- ARI – Edgerrin James – 9 rushes, 33 yards

Top receivers

- PIT – Santonio Holmes – 9 receptions, 131 yards, TD
- ARI – Larry Fitzgerald – 7 receptions, 127 yards, 2 TD

This was the first Super Bowl meeting between the Steelers and Cardinals.

== Sources ==
- "Cardinals rally past Falcons to advance to divisional round". Associated Press. January 3, 2009.
- "NFL Gamebook – ATL @ ARI" (PDF). NFL.com. January 3, 2009. Archived (PDF) from the original on February 5, 2009.
- "Sproles' big day lifts Chargers over Colts in overtime". Associated Press. January 3, 2009.
- "NFL Gamebook – IND @ SD" (PDF). NFL.com. January 3, 2009. Archived (PDF) from the original on February 5, 2009.
- "Ravens force five turnovers to end Dolphins' dream season". Associated Press. January 4, 2009.
- "NFL Gamebook – BAL @ MIA" (PDF). NFL.com. January 4, 2009. Archived (PDF) from the original on February 5, 2009.
- "Eagles top Vikings, will face NFC East rival Giants in divisional round". Associated Press. January 4, 2009.
- "NFL Gamebook – PHI @ MIN" (PDF). NFL.com. January 4, 2009. Archived (PDF) from the original on February 6, 2009.
- "Ravens capitalize on Titans' miscues to advance to AFC title game". Associated Press. January 10, 2009.
- "NFL Gamebook – BAL @ TEN" (PDF). NFL.com. January 10, 2009. Archived (PDF) from the original on January 17, 2009.
- "Cardinals earn NFC Championship Game berth with rout of Panthers". Associated Press. January 10, 2009.
- "NFL Gamebook – ARI @ CAR" (PDF). NFL.com. January 10, 2009. Archived (PDF) from the original on February 5, 2009.
- "Eagles eliminate defending champs to move on to NFC title game". Associated Press. January 11, 2009.
- "NFL Gamebook – PHI @ NYG" (PDF). NFL.com. January 11, 2009. Archived (PDF) from the original on February 5, 2009.
- "Steelers end Chargers' run, advance to AFC Championship Game". Associated Press. January 11, 2009.
- "NFL Gamebook – SD @ PIT" (PDF). NFL.com. January 11, 2009. Archived (PDF) from the original on February 5, 2009.
- "Late touchdown drive carries Arizona into its first Super Bowl". Associated Press. January 18, 2009.
- "NFL Gamebook – PHI @ ARI" (PDF). NFL.com. January 18, 2009. Archived (PDF) from the original on February 6, 2009.
- "Steelers down Ravens, punch ticket to seventh Super Bowl". Associated Press. January 18, 2009.
- "NFL Gamebook – BAL @ PIT" (PDF). NFL.com. January 18, 2009. Archived (PDF) from the original on February 5, 2009.
