= 72 Hours: True Crime =

- Country of origin: Canada
- No. of seasons: 3
- No. of episodes: 46

Production
- Running time: 30 minutes

Original release
- Network: CBC Television
- Release: January 15, 2004 – March 12, 2007

72 Hours: True Crime is a television program that commissioned by CBC Television and TLC and produced by Kensington Communications Creative Anarchy and Meech Grant Productions. It focuses on crime, specifically on the first 72 hours after a crime is committed, a critical time period for solving it. Rather than focus on fictional crimes, as do Law & Order and other TV shows elsewhere, 72 Hours: True Crime depicts actual crimes that occurred throughout North America, using dramatic reenactments of crimes and crime scenes, and documentary footage of investigators and forensic scientists. The show was broadcast in high-definition television. In 2007, CBC announced that 72 Hours was cancelled when it announced its new fall season.

== Episode list ==
=== Season 1 ===
1. Burning Obsession
2. Who Killed Santa?
3. Angel of Death
4. The Ghost
5. Loch Ness
6. Mad Bomber
7. Double Cross
8. Hijacked
9. Six Feet Under
10. Nightmare
11. The Saint
12. Danger in the Woods
13. Hate Crime
14. Hostage
15. Secret Life
16. Flying Bandit
17. Cold Hit
18. Kidnapped
19. Lone Wolf
20. The Game

=== Season 2 ===
1. Nightmare
2. Monster of Miramichi
3. Lone Wolf
4. The Violinist
5. Betrayed
6. The Great Despisers
7. Faith Healer
8. Hustler
9. Murder on Campus
10. Head in a Bucket

=== Season 3 ===
1. Bitter Truth
2. Vanished
3. Jeweler's Wife
4. Fat Bastard
5. Frenzy
6. Pointing to Murder
7. Good Doctor
8. Sweet Killer
9. The Stranger
10. Hunted
11. Predator
12. Evil Eyes
13. Lust
14. Model Killer
15. Dead End
16. Bull's Eye
