= John E. Aldred =

American business executive and financier

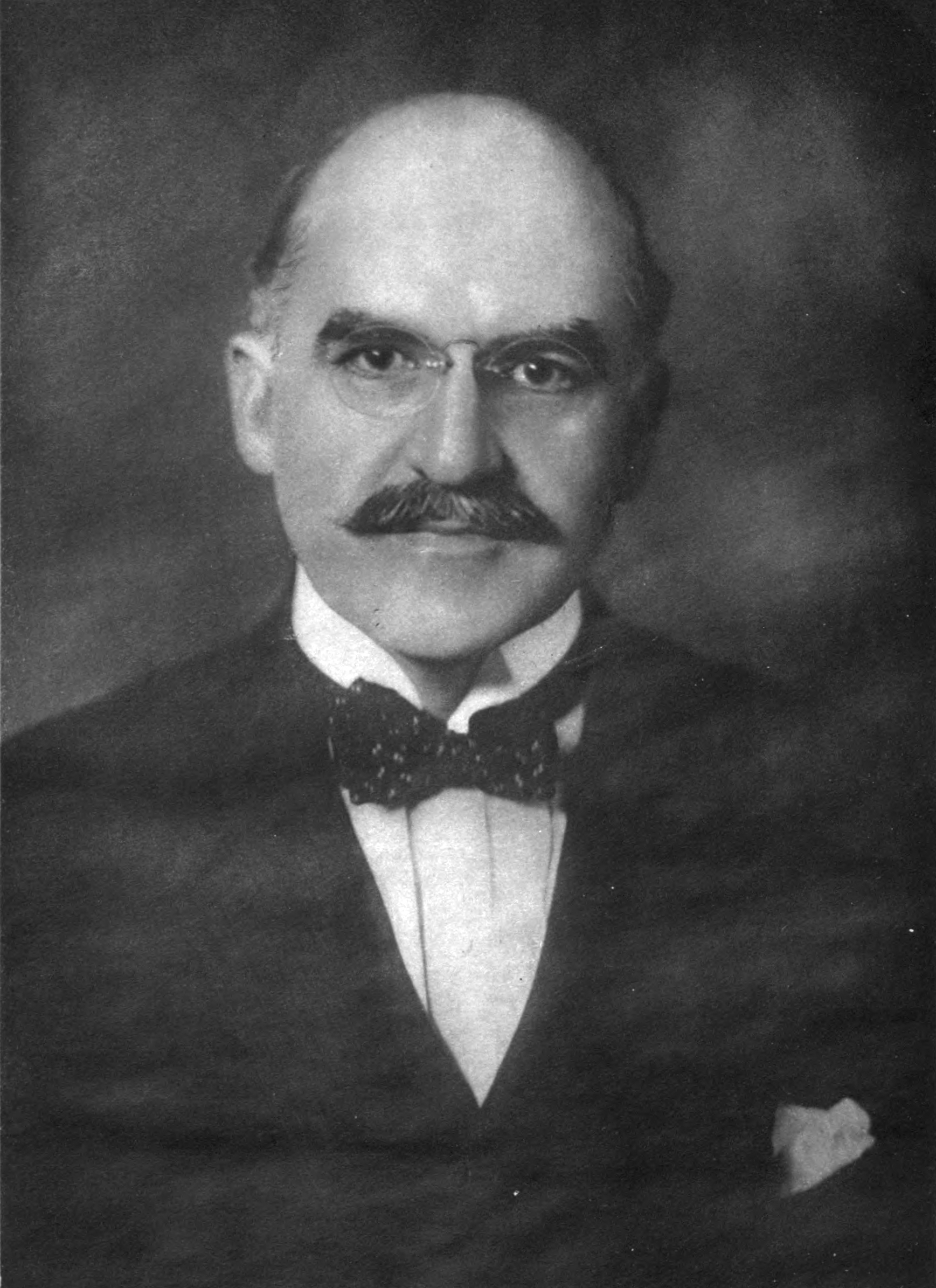
John Edward Aldred

John Edward Aldred (May 15, 1864 – November 21, 1945) was an American business executive and financier. He was director of United Railways and Electric Company of Baltimore, Maryland. Born in Lawrence, Massachusetts, he was president of Consolidated Gas, Electric Light & Power in Baltimore, and the Pennsylvania Water & Power Company He was also the Chairman of the Gillette Safety Razor Company. His home was the John E. Aldred Estate. In 1928, he built the Riverside Congregational Church in Lawrence, MA, which is currently known as United Riverside Congregational Church. He died at the Garden City Hotel in Garden City, New York.

In 1930, he built the Aldred Building in Montreal.
