= Baltimore Gas and Electric =

American gas and electric utility

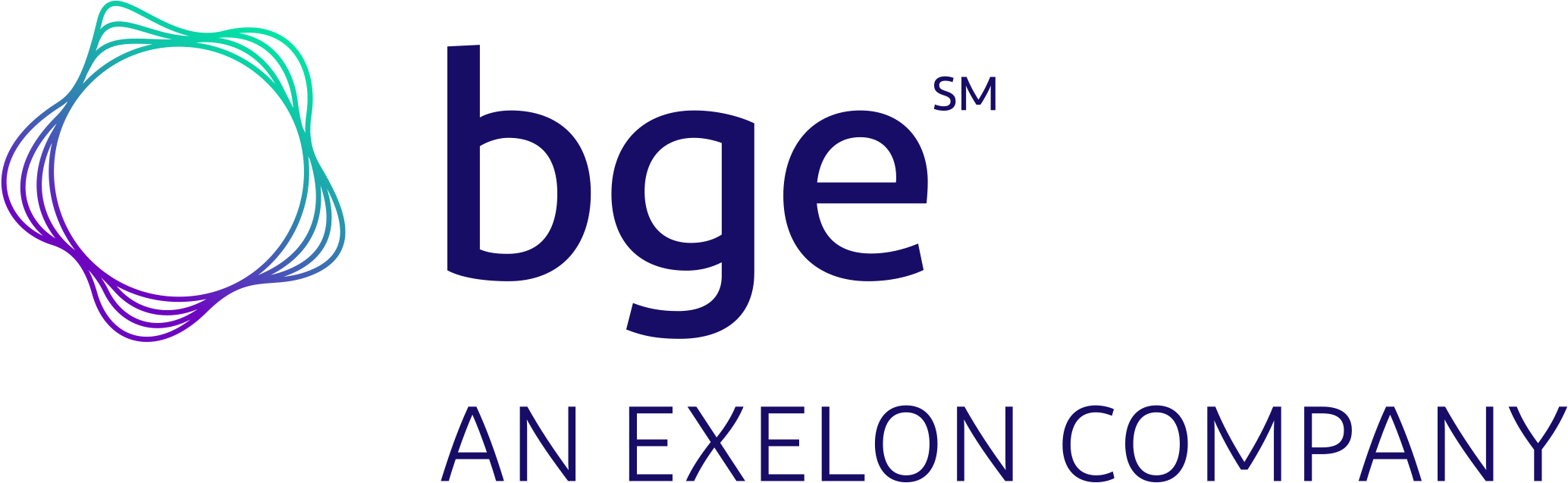
- Type: Subsidiary
- Industry: Electric power and Natural gas
- Founded: June 17, 1816; 210 years ago Baltimore, Maryland, U.S.
- Founder: Rembrandt Peale, (1778-1860)
- Headquarters: Baltimore, Maryland, U.S.
- Area served: Baltimore metropolitan area
- Key people: Calvin G. Butler, Jr.
- Services: Electric power transmission
- Parent: Exelon Corporation
- Website: bge.com

Baltimore Gas and Electric Company (BGE) is a subsidiary of the Exelon Corporation and Maryland’s largest gas and electric utility. BGE earlier had created the holding company Constellation Energy in 1999. Constellation Energy was acquired by Exelon in 2012.

Headquartered in Baltimore, BGE provides service to more than 1.2 million electric customers and more than 650,000 natural gas customers in central Maryland. BGE employs 3,100 people in the state of Maryland, making the company one of the 15 largest private employers in the region.

== History ==
Artist / sculptor /museum operator Rembrandt Peale, (1778-1860), incorporated the "Gas Light Company of Baltimore" on June 17, 1816, after having exhibited gas lighting at his Holliday Street museum, designed by famed local architect Robert Cary Long, Jr. and built and opened in 1814 (between East Saratoga and East Lexington Streets - after a variety of uses including as Baltimore's City Hall, 1830–1875, in 1931 it became the Municipal Museum of the City of Baltimore, popularly known once again as the Peale Museum into 1997). This was the first gas company in the Americas. The first streetlamp installed by the Gas Light Company of Baltimore stood at the corner of North Holliday and East Baltimore streets and was lit on February 7, 1817. By February 1818, only 28 gas-lit lamps existed. The Belvidere Theatre became the first public building to be lit using gas. Over the next decades the company experimented with piping, meters, and other mechanical technology. Baltimore committed to gas for municipal use, including the installation of gas service in all public markets between by 1851. Private subscription also steadily increased; by 1870, the company had 15,301 customers in Baltimore.

=== Safe Harbor ===
In 1930 the Safe Harbor Water and Power Corporation was incorporated in order to construct and operate the Safe Harbor Dam. There were two shareholders: Baltimore Gas and Electric (then as Consolidated Gas Electric Light and Power Company of Baltimore) held a 2/3rd share and Pennsylvania Water & Power Company the other third. The dam, lake and generating plant were all constructed and operational within two years. Seven generating units were installed with a total capacity of 230 MW, costing $34 million.

=== Post WWII ===
In 1955, the company rebranded to become Baltimore Gas and Electric, and began to recognize the acronym BGE sometime during the 1990s.

Baltimore Gas and Electric is under common control with Maryland's second and third largest electric utilities after the Maryland Public Service Commission approved the acquisition of Pepco Holdings by Exelon in 2015. The acquisition of Pepco Holdings by Exelon was completed in 2016.

== Controversies ==
The Public Service Commission released a report stating: "Based on the response and evidence submitted by BGE, Staff concludes that BGE failed to provide for safe operation and maintenance of the facilities" following a 2019 gas explosion in Columbia, Maryland which destroyed a 57,000 square-foot commercial building.

=== 2020 gas explosion ===
On August 10, 2020 at approximately 9:54 AM (EDT) a major natural gas explosion leveled 3 homes in Reisterstown Station on the 4200 block of Labyrinth Road, trapping multiple people, killing two and injuring seven. Representatives for BGE stated the cause of the explosion is unknown.

== Operations ==
BGE's electric service territory includes Baltimore City and all part of the Central Maryland counties including: Anne Arundel, Baltimore, Calvert, Carroll, Harford, and Howard counties

BGE is a member of two shared-crew networks in the Southeast and Mid-Atlantic regions and frequently sends crews to help restore power to customers across those regions after severe weather events. The utility has dealt with major outages following meteorological events in the mid-Atlantic region, including the June 2012 derecho and Hurricane Sandy in October of the same year. In the aftermath of Hurricane Sandy, BGE restored power to more than 300,000 customers. The utility has proposed the construction and operation of microgrids, capable of generating and distributing electricity during larger outages to the centralized electrical grid; however, in July 2016, the Maryland Public Service Commission rejected BGE's request to construct microgrids.

In 2012, the company began replacing analog electric meters with smart meters to create a less expensive grid system. In June 2016, the Maryland Public Service Commission turned down BGE's request for a rate increase to recover the $48 million cost of installing smart meters, granting them instead an increase that was only 50% of what the utility requested. The $2.80 rate increase went into effect in June 2016 and raised BGE customers’ average electric bill to $134.33 per month.

In October 2015, BGE filed a lawsuit against the city of Baltimore over the city's attempt to increase the fee it charges the utility for the use of its underground conduit system. In November 2016, BGE and the city settled the suit, with the utility accepting an increase to $24 million a year to use the city's 741 miles (1,193 km) long conduit system.

== Community ==
Through its Green Grants program, BGE offers grants of up to $10,000 to environmental non-profits in central Maryland. Since 2013, the company has awarded more than $1 million through the program. Past recipients include:

- 4-H Chesapeake Bay Stewards Program
- Project Clean Stream and Clean Water Communities
- Rainscape and Environmental Educational Program
- Bio-science Educational Program and Outreach
- Fall Free Tree Giveaway
- Increasing Tree Canopy Projects
- Recycling days
- Neighborhood Beautification
- A Green Place to Play
- Community Wildlife Habitat
- Fresh Fruit Farm

In 2015, BGE launched a program that allows customers to report osprey nests on or near electrical lines. The company then insulates or moves the nest to special platforms. In the program's first year, learned of 23 nests built on electrical equipment.

As part of BGE's bicentennial celebration in 2016, the company added large, decorative murals to the three large storage tanks on its Spring Gardens campus in south Baltimore. BGE also partnered with the Cal Ripken, Sr. Foundation in 2016 to construct Eddie Murray Field in west Baltimore.
