= Vincent Lynch =

Vincent Lynch may refer to:

- Vincent Lynch (Ulysses), a character in the novel Ulysses by James Joyce
- Vincent Lynch (cyclist) (born 1968), Barbadian cyclist
- Vincent DePaul Lynch (1927–1984), pharmacology and toxicology professor
