= John E. Aldred Estate =

Historic house in New York, United States

- U.S. National Register of Historic Places
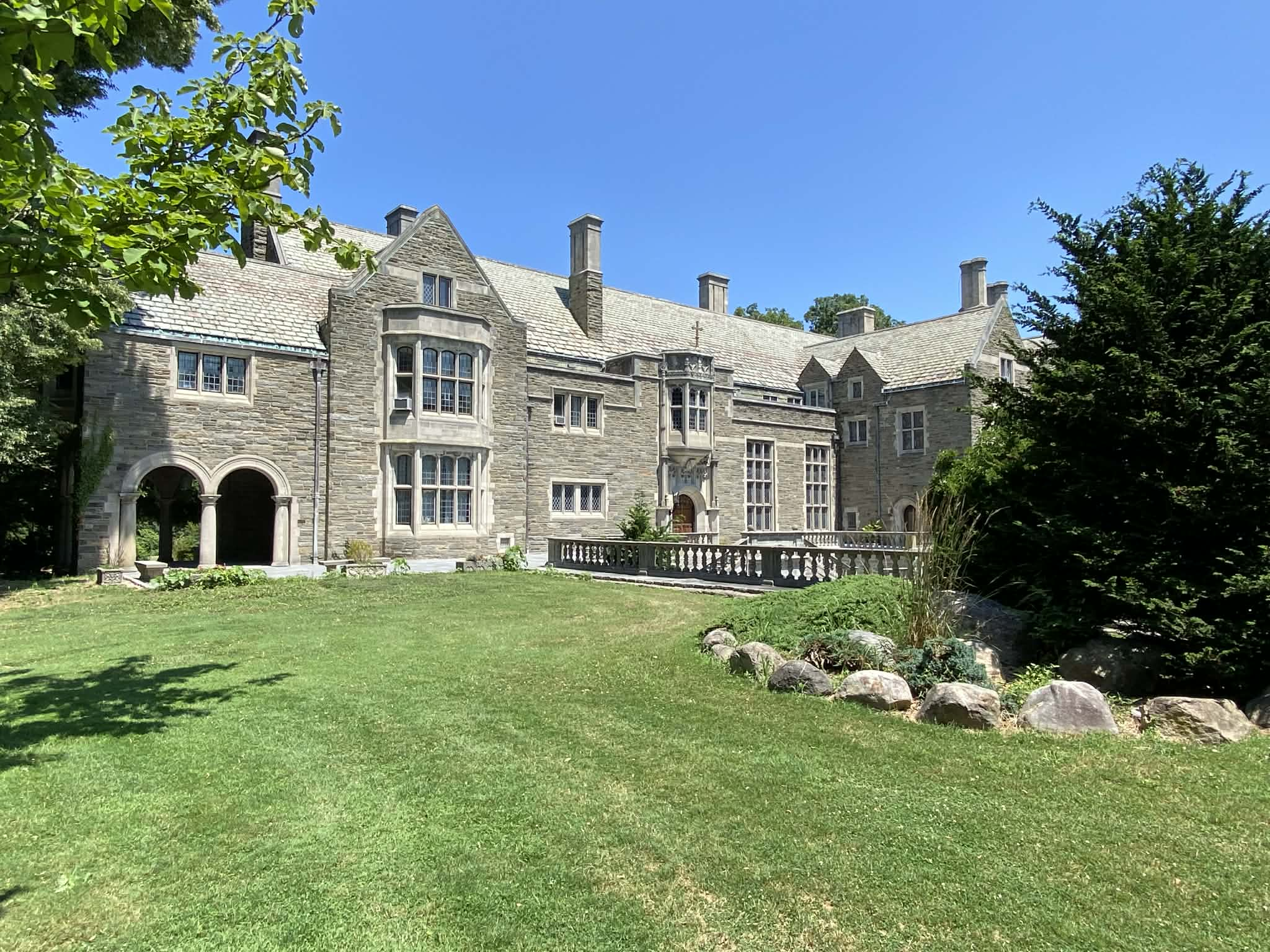
- Photograph taken of the Aldred residence in 2025.

- Location within New York Location within the United States
- Location: Lattingtown Rd., Lattingtown, New York
- Coordinates: 40°53′40″N 73°36′59″W
- Area: 90 acres (36 ha)
- Built: 1916
- Architect: Goodhue, Bertram Grosvenor
- Architectural style: Tudor Revival
- NRHP reference No.: 79001594
- Added to NRHP: August 3, 1979

John E. Aldred Estate, also known as St. Josaphat's Monastery, is a historic estate located at Lattingtown in Nassau County, New York. It was designed in 1916 by architect Bertram Goodhue, with landscaping by Olmsted Brothers, for public utility executive John Edward Aldred.

The estate consists of the main residence, known as Ormston; the superintendent's quarters; hen house; 2 1/2-story, hip-roofed stable; greenhouse and conservatory; garage; utility shed; garden shed; gazebo; and two gatehouses. The main house is a Tudor Revival–style dwelling built of random-coursed, quarry-faced limestone and roofed in heavy slate. The Basilian Order of Saint Josaphat purchased the property in 1944.

It was listed on the National Register of Historic Places in 1979.
