= Darrick Forrest =

American football player (born 1999)

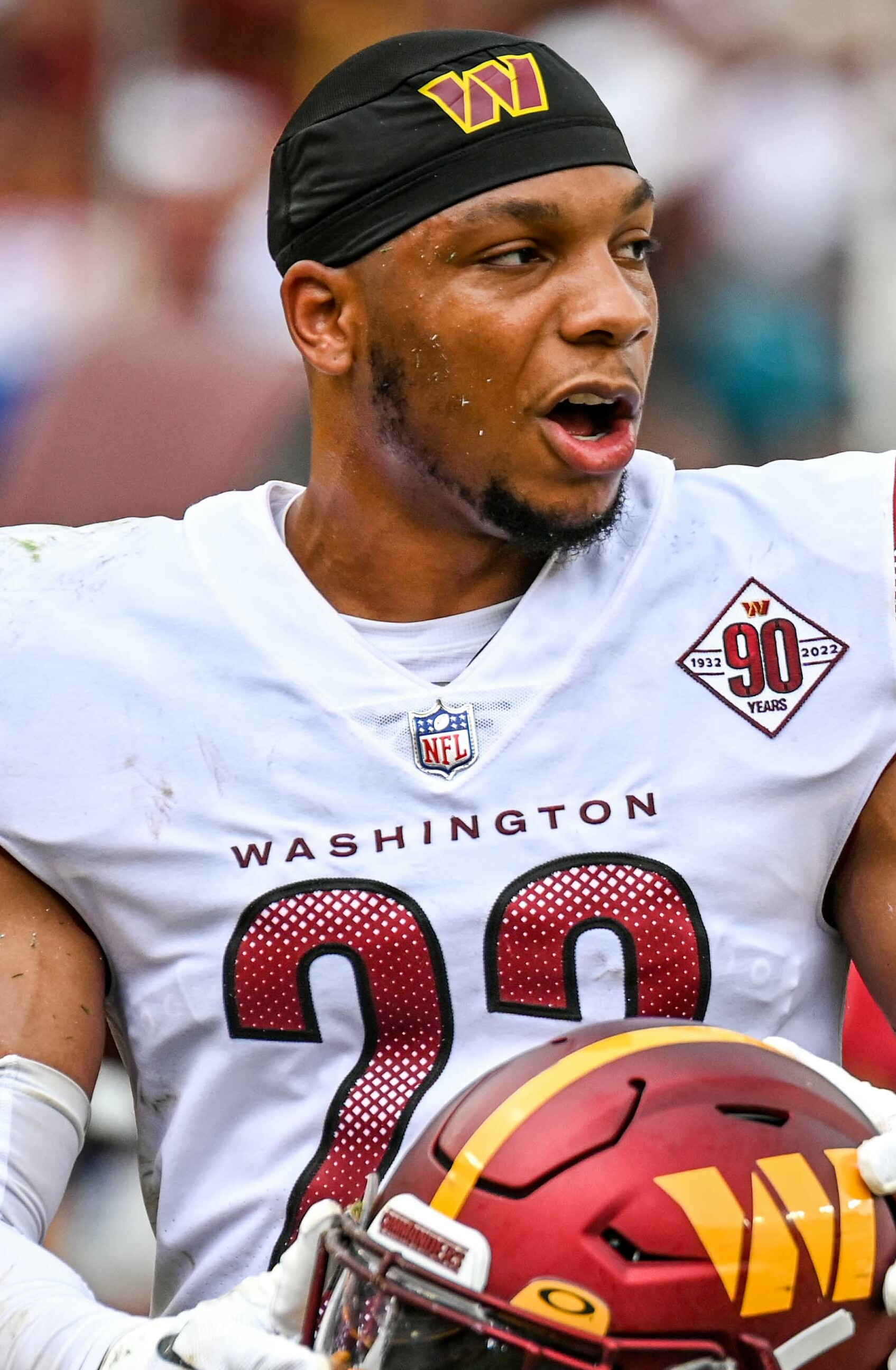
- Forrest with the Washington Commanders in 2022

No. 29 – San Francisco 49ers
- Position: Safety
- Roster status: Injured reserve

Personal information
- Born: May 22, 1999 (age 27); Columbus, Ohio, U.S.
- Listed height: 5 ft 11 in (1.80 m)
- Listed weight: 200 lb (91 kg)

Career information
- High school: Walnut Ridge (Columbus)
- College: Cincinnati (2017–2020)
- NFL draft: 2021: 5th round, 163rd overall pick

Career history
- Washington Football Team / Commanders (2021–2024); Buffalo Bills (2025)*; Indianapolis Colts (2025)*; Pittsburgh Steelers (2025)*; San Francisco 49ers (2025–present)
- * Offseason or practice squad member only

Awards and highlights
- First-team All-AAC (2019)

Career NFL statistics as of 2024
- Tackles: 137
- Forced fumbles: 2
- Fumble recoveries: 1
- Pass deflections: 9
- Interceptions: 4
- Stats at Pro Football Reference

Darrick Forrest Jr. (born May 22, 1999) is an American professional football safety for the San Francisco 49ers of the National Football League (NFL). He played college football for the Cincinnati Bearcats and was drafted by the Washington Football Team of the National Football League (NFL) in the fifth round of the 2021 NFL draft.

== Early life and college ==
Forrest was born on May 22, 1999, and attended Walnut Ridge High School in Columbus, Ohio. A 3-star recruit, Forrest committed to play college football at Cincinnati over offers from Ball State, Bowling Green, Eastern Michigan, Miami (OH), Ohio, Toledo, and Youngstown State.

== Professional career ==
Pre-draft measurables
| Height | Weight | Arm length | Hand span | Wingspan | 40-yard dash | 10-yard split | 20-yard split | 20-yard shuttle | Three-cone drill | Vertical jump | Broad jump | Bench press |
|---|---|---|---|---|---|---|---|---|---|---|---|---|
| 5 ft 11 1/2 in (1.82 m) | 206 lb (93 kg) | 31 7/8 in (0.81 m) | 9 3/4 in (0.25 m) | 6 ft 3 5/8 in (1.92 m) | 4.41 s | 1.51 s | 2.60 s | 4.22 s | 6.91 s | 39.0 in (0.99 m) | 11 ft 0 in (3.35 m) | 21 reps |
All values from Pro Day

=== Washington Football Team / Commanders ===
Forrest was drafted by the Washington Football Team in the fifth round (163rd overall) of the 2021 NFL draft. He signed his four-year rookie contract on May 13, 2021. Forrest was placed on injured reserve on September 1. He was activated on November 2.

In Week 1 of the 2022 season against the Jacksonville Jaguars, Forrest had his first career start and recorded five tackles, two deflected passes, a forced fumble, and a game-sealing interception, which was the first of his career, late in the fourth quarter. In Week 10, Forrest recorded an interception and a fumble recovery in Washington's 32-21 upset victory over the undefeated Philadelphia Eagles. Before the Week 11 game, Forrest was made the starting free safety taking over for Bobby McCain. Forrest recorded his third career interception in Washington's 23–10 victory over the Houston Texans. He finished the 2022 season with 88 tackles, four interceptions, nine pass breakups, two forced fumbles, and one fumble recovery over 17 games (starting 11 of them).

On October 10, 2023, Forrest was placed on injured reserve for a shoulder injury. He finished the 2023 season with 29 tackles over five games. Forrest lost his starting role under the new scheme implemented by defensive coordinator, Joe Whitt Jr. He played in ten games, with one start, in the 2024 regular season and recorded 13 tackles.

=== Buffalo Bills ===
On March 13, 2025, Forrest signed a one-year deal with the Buffalo Bills. He was released on August 26 as part of final roster cuts.

=== Indianapolis Colts ===
On September 9, 2025, Forrest was signed to the practice squad of the Indianapolis Colts. He was released on September 13.

=== Pittsburgh Steelers ===
On October 29, 2025, the Pittsburgh Steelers signed Forrest to their practice squad. He was released on November 12.

=== San Francisco 49ers ===
On January 14, 2026, Forrest was signed to the San Francisco 49ers' practice squad. On January 20, he signed a reserve/futures contract with San Francisco. Forrest was placed on injured reserve on May 28, due to an undisclosed injury.
