= Walnut Ridge High School (Columbus, Ohio) =

Public, coeducational high school in Columbus, Ohio, United States

Location
- 4841 East Livingston Avenue; Columbus, (Franklin County), Ohio 43227; United States; 39°56′37″N 82°51′58″W

Information
- Type: Public, coeducational high school
- Opened: 1963
- Superintendent: Angela Chapman
- Teaching staff: 44.00 (FTE)
- Grades: 9-12
- Student to teacher ratio: 16.52
- Campus size: 44 acres
- Colors: Red, gray and white
- Athletics: Varsity, junior varsity and freshman teams
- Athletics conference: Columbus City League
- Sports: Boys' baseball, basketball, bowling, cross-country, football, golf, soccer, tennis, track & field, Wrestling; girls' basketball, cheerleading, cross-country, golf, softball, track & field, volleyball
- Team name: Scots
- Rival: Independence high school
- Accreditation: North Central Association of Colleges and Schools
- Website: https://walnutridgehs.ccsoh.us/

Walnut Ridge High School is a public high school located on the far east side of Columbus, Ohio, United States. It is neighbored by the Far East Recreation Center and Big Walnut Creek.

== History ==
The school colors are red, gray and white. The sports teams' nickname is the Scots, in honor of the school's sister school, the Harlaw Academy in Scotland. In recognition of this, the school's color scheme has been officially recorded as a distinct tartan pattern. Walnut Ridge is a four-year high school with an enrollment of 860. It is accredited by the North Central Association of Secondary Schools and Colleges, and by the Department of Education of the State of Ohio. It has student representation from 27 countries.

At its peak in the early 1970s, the school had an enrollment of over 1,800 in grades 10-12. Starting with the 1971-72 school year, Walnut Ridge went into split sessions. This lasted until enrollment declined due to other schools opening in the area. Declining enrollment for city schools started after many fled Columbus City Schools after a federal court mandated desegregation of the district in 1979.

In 1987, a four-student team from the school won the National Academic Championship, a question-and-answer competition, beating the team from Walt Whitman High School of Bethesda, Maryland. The team consisted of Susan Wright, Garrett Schwartz, Mu Chun Yin, and captain Michael Dake.

== Curriculum ==
Academically, Walnut Ridge offers Advanced Placement courses in Chemistry, English literature and composition, calculus (AB), government & politics and U.S. history. It also offers PSEO (post-secondary enrollment option) through Hocking College. Students enrolled in the PSEO program can earn high school credit as well as college credit in English and Government. Concurrent enrollment is also available through local universities.

== Sports ==
In sports, the school's traditional rival was Eastmoor High School. This was in part because when Walnut Ridge opened to students in 1961, more than half of its enrollment were former Eastmoor students. Walnut Ridge Students attended classes in the Eastmoor High School building in the afternoons while the Eastmoor students attended classes in the same building in the mornings. This continued for a few months until the new Walnut Ridge building received its certificate of occupancy. From the late 60s on, the winner of the annual football game between these two schools received the Victory Bell trophy to go along with their bragging rights. Since 2000 the biggest rival has been Independence High School.

Walnut Ridge fields varsity teams in baseball, boys' & girls' basketball, cheer-leading, boys' & girls' cross-country, drill team, football, boys' & girls' golf, boys' soccer, softball, tennis, boys' & girls' track&field and wrestling.

== Notable alumni ==
- Copywrite, real name Peter Nelson, hip hop recording artist
- Greg Cox (Class of '84), safety for the San Francisco 49ers and New York Giants
- Darrick Forrest (Class of 2017), safety for the Buffalo Bills
- Malik Harrison (Class of 2016), linebacker for Ohio State University and Baltimore Ravens
- Conrad James, politician, former member of the New Mexico House of Representatives
- Gary Russell (Class of 2004), American football, running back, Pittsburgh Steelers, Oakland Raiders
- Camu Tao, real name Tero Smith, hip hop recording artist and producer
- Austin Traylor (Class of 2011), tight end for the Denver Broncos
- Ernie Wheelwright (Class of 2003), American football wide receiver, Baltimore Ravens; Canadian Football ,Saskatchewan Roughriders
- Julius Wood (Class of 2019), American football safety, Dallas Cowboys, Tennessee Titans
