= John Abbet Walls =

American engineer and businessman

- Born: September 5, 1879; Lewisburg, Pennsylvania
- Died: May 8, 1964 (aged 84); Baltimore, Maryland
- Education: Massachusetts Institute of Technology
- Occupations: Businessman and engineer

John Abbet Walls (September 5, 1879 – May 8, 1964) was an American engineer and businessman, notable as president of the Pennsylvania Water and Power Company.

== Education ==
In 1899, he earned a degree in engineering from the Massachusetts Institute of Technology, located in Cambridge, Massachusetts.

== Career ==
Walls started work at the Niagara Falls Hydraulic Power and Manufacturing Company, located in Niagara Falls, New York.

He became assistant engineer of the Montreal Shawinigan Water and Power Company, located in the Canadian city of Montreal, Quebec, in 1901.

Walls was named chief engineer of the Pennsylvania Water and Power Company. As chief engineer he was involved in dam construction. He was later president of the company.

== See also ==
- List of electrical engineers
- List of Massachusetts Institute of Technology alumni
- List of people from Montreal
- List of people from Niagara Falls, New York
- List of people from Pennsylvania
