= Julius Wood =

American football player (born 2001)

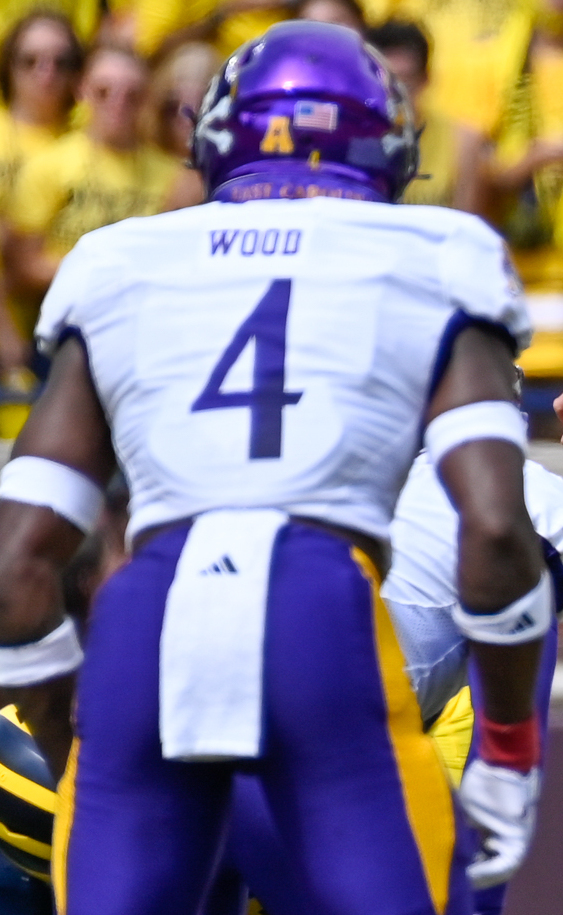
- Wood with East Carolina in 2023

No. 25 – Miami Dolphins
- Position: Safety
- Roster status: Active

Personal information
- Born: May 2, 2001 (age 25); Columbus, Ohio, U.S.
- Listed height: 6 ft 1 in (1.85 m)
- Listed weight: 202 lb (92 kg)

Career information
- High school: Walnut Ridge (Columbus)
- College: Blinn (2019–2020); East Carolina (2021–2023)
- NFL draft: 2024: undrafted

Career history
- Dallas Cowboys (2024)*; Tennessee Titans (2024); Dallas Cowboys (2025)*; Miami Dolphins (2026–present)
- * Offseason or practice squad member only

Awards and highlights
- First team All-AAC (2023)

Career NFL statistics as of 2025
- Total tackles: 2
- Stats at Pro Football Reference

Julius Wood (born May 2, 2001) is an American professional football safety for the Miami Dolphins of the National Football League (NFL). He played college football for the East Carolina Pirates and was signed by the Dallas Cowboys as an undrafted free agent after the 2024 NFL draft.

== Early life ==
Wood attended Walnut Ridge High School. As a senior, he tallied 90 tackles (18 for loss), 5.5 sacks, 19 receptions for 275 yards and 7 touchdowns.

== College career ==
Wood enrolled at Blinn College. As a freshman, he appeared in 9 games, collecting 36 tackles (1.5 for loss) and 2 fumble recoveries. As a sophomore, he appeared in 3 games, making 19 tackles.

He transferred after his sophomore season to East Carolina University. As a junior in 2021, he appeared in all 12 games as a backup safety playing mainly on special teams. He totaled 10 defensive tackles and 6 special teams tackles. He had 4 tackles (one for loss) against Temple University.

As a senior in 2022, he started 12 out of 13 games at safety and led the team with 87 tackles. He also collected 1.5 tackles for loss, 2 interceptions, 4 pass breakups, one quarterback hurry and 3 forced fumbles. He had 11 tackles against Temple University. He received the conference's Defensive Player of the Week honors for his play against the University of Memphis, where he made 11 tackles and returned an interception for a 47-yard touchdown.

As a super senior in 2023, he started all 12 games, leading the team for the second consecutive season in total tackles with 86. He also had 2 interceptions, one pass breakup, 3 tackles for loss and one quarterback hurry. He had 11 tackles against the University of Texas at San Antonio.

== Professional career ==
Pre-draft measurables
Height	Weight	Arm length	Hand span	Wingspan	40-yard dash	10-yard split	20-yard split	20-yard shuttle	Three-cone drill	Vertical jump	Broad jump	Bench press
6 ft 1 in (1.85 m)	193 lb (88 kg)	32 1/4 in (0.82 m)	9 1/2 in (0.24 m)	6 ft 4 3/4 in (1.95 m)	4.74 s	1.70 s	2.72 s	4.43 s	6.78 s	33.5 in (0.85 m)	10 ft 2 in (3.10 m)	11 reps
All values from Pro Day

=== Dallas Cowboys ===
Wood was signed as an undrafted free agent by the Dallas Cowboys after the 2024 NFL draft on May 9. He was waived on August 27, 2024.

=== Tennessee Titans ===
Wood was claimed off waivers by the Tennessee Titans on August 28, 2024. On December 3, Wood was suspended for six games for violating the NFL's performing-enhancing drugs policy, requiring him to sit out the rest of his rookie season and the first game of his next season. He completed the 2024 season with two tackles and nine games played.

Wood was waived by the Titans on August 25, 2025.

=== Dallas Cowboys (second stint) ===
On October 7, 2025, Wood signed with the practice squad of the Dallas Cowboys. He signed a reserve/future contract with Dallas on January 6, 2026. On August 30, Wood was waived by the Cowboys as a part of final roster cuts.

=== Miami Dolphins ===
On August 31, 2026, Wood was claimed off of waivers by the Miami Dolphins.
