= Austin Traylor =

American football player (born 1993)

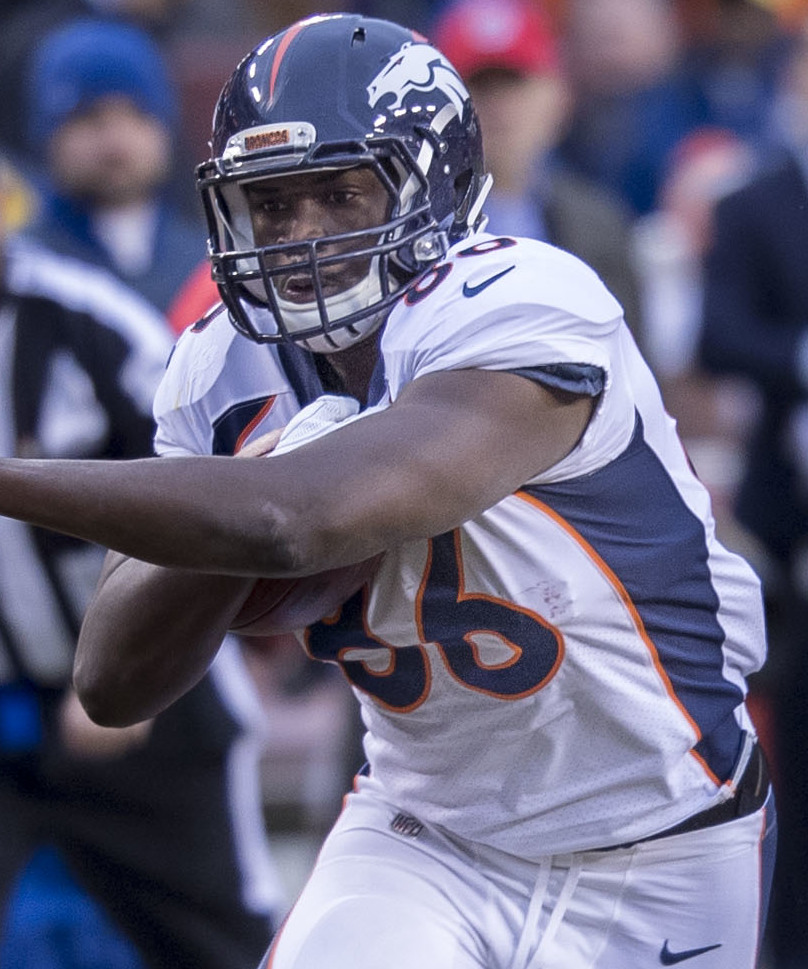
- Traylor with the Denver Broncos in 2017

No. 86
- Position: Tight end

Personal information
- Born: September 3, 1993 (age 33); Columbus, Ohio, U.S.
- Listed height: 6 ft 3 in (1.91 m)
- Listed weight: 254 lb (115 kg)

Career information
- High school: Walnut Ridge (Columbus, Ohio)
- College: Wisconsin
- NFL draft: 2016: undrafted

Career history
- Dallas Cowboys (2016)*; San Diego Chargers (2016)*; New England Patriots (2016)*; Baltimore Ravens (2016)*; Denver Broncos (2016–2017); Salt Lake Stallions (2019); Detroit Lions (2019)*
- * Offseason or practice squad member only

Career NFL statistics
- Receptions: 8
- Receiving yards: 100
- Stats at Pro Football Reference

Austin Traylor (born September 3, 1993) is an American former professional football player who was a tight end in the National Football League (NFL). He played college football for the Wisconsin Badgers.

== Early life ==
Traylor attended Walnut Ridge High School. He accepted a football scholarship from the University of Wisconsin–Madison.

== Professional career ==
=== Dallas Cowboys ===
Traylor was signed as an undrafted free agent by the Dallas Cowboys after the 2016 NFL draft on May 17. He was waived on September 3, 2016, and signed to the practice squad the next day. He was released on September 14.

=== San Diego Chargers ===
On September 20, 2016, Traylor was signed to the San Diego Chargers' practice squad. He was released on October 4, 2016.

=== New England Patriots ===
On November 1, 2016, Traylor was signed to the New England Patriots' practice squad. He was released on November 12, 2016.

=== Baltimore Ravens ===
On November 15, 2016, Traylor was signed to the Baltimore Ravens' practice squad, but was released four days later.

=== Denver Broncos ===
On December 20, 2016, Traylor was signed to the Denver Broncos' practice squad. He signed a reserve/future contract with the Broncos on January 2, 2017.

On September 2, 2017, Traylor was waived by the Broncos and was signed to the practice squad the next day. He was promoted to the active roster on November 18, 2017.

=== Salt Lake Stallions ===
In January 2019, Traylor joined the Salt Lake Stallions of the Alliance of American Football. He caught 2 passes for 12 yards in 8 games played, after which the league shut down in April.

=== Detroit Lions ===
On July 22, 2019, Traylor signed with the Detroit Lions. He was waived on August 31, 2019.
