= John Walls (cricketer) =

New Zealand cricketer (1856–1945)

Personal information
- Born: 25 October 1856; Melbourne, Colony of Victoria
- Died: 13 March 1945 (aged 88); Dunedin, Otago, New Zealand

Domestic team information
- Years: Team
- 1886/87: Otago
- Source: CricInfo, 26 May 2016

John Walls (25 October 1856 – 13 March 1945) was an Australian-born cricketer. He played one first-class match in New Zealand for Otago during the 1886–87 season.

Walls was born at Melbourne in the Colony of Victoria in 1856. He kept wicket for Oamaru against the touring Australians in a team of 22 in January 1881 and played for an Otago team of 22 against the Australians again in November 1886. His only first-class match came later in the same season against Canterbury at Christchurch. In the match, which was played in February 1887, he made scores of eight and 20 runs and did not take a wicket in a heavy Otago defeat. In February 1895 Walls played for Southland against the touring Fiji side at Invercargill.

Walls died at Dunedin in 1945. He was aged 88.
