= Greg Cox (American football) =

American football player (born 1965)

No. 38
- Position: Safety

Personal information
- Born: January 6, 1965 (age 61); Niagara Falls, New York, U.S.
- Listed height: 6 ft 0 in (1.83 m)
- Listed weight: 223 lb (101 kg)

Career information
- High school: Walnut Ridge (Columbus, Ohio)
- College: San Jose State
- NFL draft: 1988: undrafted

Career history
- San Francisco 49ers (1988); New York Giants (1989); San Francisco 49ers (1990–1991); San Jose SaberCats (1995)

Awards and highlights
- Super Bowl champion (XXIII)

Career NFL statistics
- Sacks: 1
- Stats at Pro Football Reference

Gregory Mark Cox (born January 6, 1965) is an American former professional football safety in the National Football League (NFL). He played college football for the San Jose State Spartans. He played four seasons for the San Francisco 49ers (1988, 1990–1991) and New York Giants (1989). In 2024, Cox was arrested in Mendocino County for being an alleged accomplice to a robbery gone wrong turned attempted murder. Cox is accused with Felony conspiracy and felony attempted second-degree robbery.
