= Pennsylvania Water and Power =

Pennsylvania Water & Power
- Industry: Power Generation
- Founded: June 4, 1920; 104 years ago
- Successor: Talen Energy Corporation
- Headquarters: United States
- Key people: John Abbet Walls, President

Pennsylvania Water and Power was an American company. It was the first power plant in the world to combine a hydroelectric generator and a coal power generator on the same site. John Abbet Walls was president.

In 1930 it became a minority shareholder in the Safe Harbor Water and Power Corporation, incorporated in order to construct and operate the Safe Harbor Dam, together with the 2/3rd majority shareholder, the Consolidated Gas Electric Light and Power Company of Baltimore. The dam, lake and generating plant were all constructed and operational within two years. Seven generating units were installed with a total capacity of 230 MW, costing $34 million.
