= Gary Russell (American football) =

American football player (born 1986)

No. 33, 22
- Position: Running back

Personal information
- Born: September 8, 1986 (age 40); Columbus, Ohio, U.S.
- Listed height: 5 ft 10 in (1.78 m)
- Listed weight: 205 lb (93 kg)

Career information
- High school: Walnut Ridge (Columbus)
- College: Minnesota
- NFL draft: 2007: undrafted

Career history
- Pittsburgh Steelers (2007–2008); Cincinnati Bengals (2009)*; Oakland Raiders (2009); Marion Blue Racers (2013)*; Columbus Fire (2014)*
- * Offseason or practice squad member only

Awards and highlights
- Super Bowl champion (XLIII)

Career NFL statistics
- Rushing yards: 98
- Rushing average: 2.6
- Rushing touchdowns: 3
- Receptions: 13
- Receiving yards: 94
- Stats at Pro Football Reference

Gary Russell (born September 8, 1986) is an American former professional football player who was a running back in the National Football League (NFL). He played college football for the Minnesota Golden Gophers and was signed by the Pittsburgh Steelers as an undrafted free agent in 2007. He won Super Bowl XLIII with the Steelers, scoring a touchdown in the game.

Russell also played for the Oakland Raiders.

== Early life ==
Russell attended Walnut Ridge High School in Columbus, Ohio.

College recruiting
Name	Hometown	School	Height	Weight	40^{‡}	Commit date
Gary Russell; RB	Columbus, Ohio	Walnut Ridge High School	5 ft 10 in (1.78 m)	195 lb (88 kg)	4.45	Dec 22, 2003
Gary Russell; RB	Recruit ratings: Scout: Rivals:					
Overall recruit ranking: Scout: -- (RB) Rivals: -- (RB), -- (OH)
Note: In many cases, Scout, Rivals, 247Sports, On3, and ESPN may conflict in their listings of height and weight.; In these cases, the average was taken. ESPN grades are on a 100-point scale.; Sources: "Minnesota Football Commitment List (24)". Rivals.; "Minnesota College Football Recruiting Commits". Scout.; "Scout.com Team Recruiting Rankings". Scout.; "2004 Team Ranking". Rivals.com.

== College career ==
Russell played college football for the Minnesota Golden Gophers where in 2005, he went past the 1,000-yard rushing mark for the year totaling 18 rushing touchdowns while splitting carries with Laurence Maroney. Prior to the 2005 season he played sparingly behind Marion Barber III and Maroney.

== Professional career ==
=== Pittsburgh Steelers ===
Russell was acquired by the Pittsburgh Steelers as an undrafted free agent in 2007. He saw limited playing time, rushing for only 21 yards on 7 carries, due to playing behind Pro-Bowl running back Willie Parker and Najeh Davenport.

Russell was waived by the Steelers on September 20, 2008, to make room for linebacker Patrick Bailey, who was promoted from the practice squad to active roster. Russell was re-signed to the practice squad on September 23. Russell was promoted to the active roster again after rookie running back Rashard Mendenhall was placed on injured reserve. Gary was the Steelers main kick returner and short yardage back after coming off the practice squad in 2008.

Russell rushed for a one-yard touchdown during the second quarter of Super Bowl XLIII. He finished the game with two attempts for −3 yards and 1 touchdown on the way to his first and only Super Bowl ring.

He was released by the Steelers on April 16, 2009.

=== Cincinnati Bengals ===
Russell was claimed off waivers by the Cincinnati Bengals on April 17, 2009. However, he was released by the team just ten days later on April 27.

=== Oakland Raiders ===
Russell was signed by the Oakland Raiders on May 8, 2009.

=== Marion Blue Racers ===
In September 2012, Russell signed with the Marion Blue Racers of the Continental Indoor Football League for the 2013 season.
