= Reisterstown Station, Baltimore =

Reisterstown Station
- neighborhood statistical area
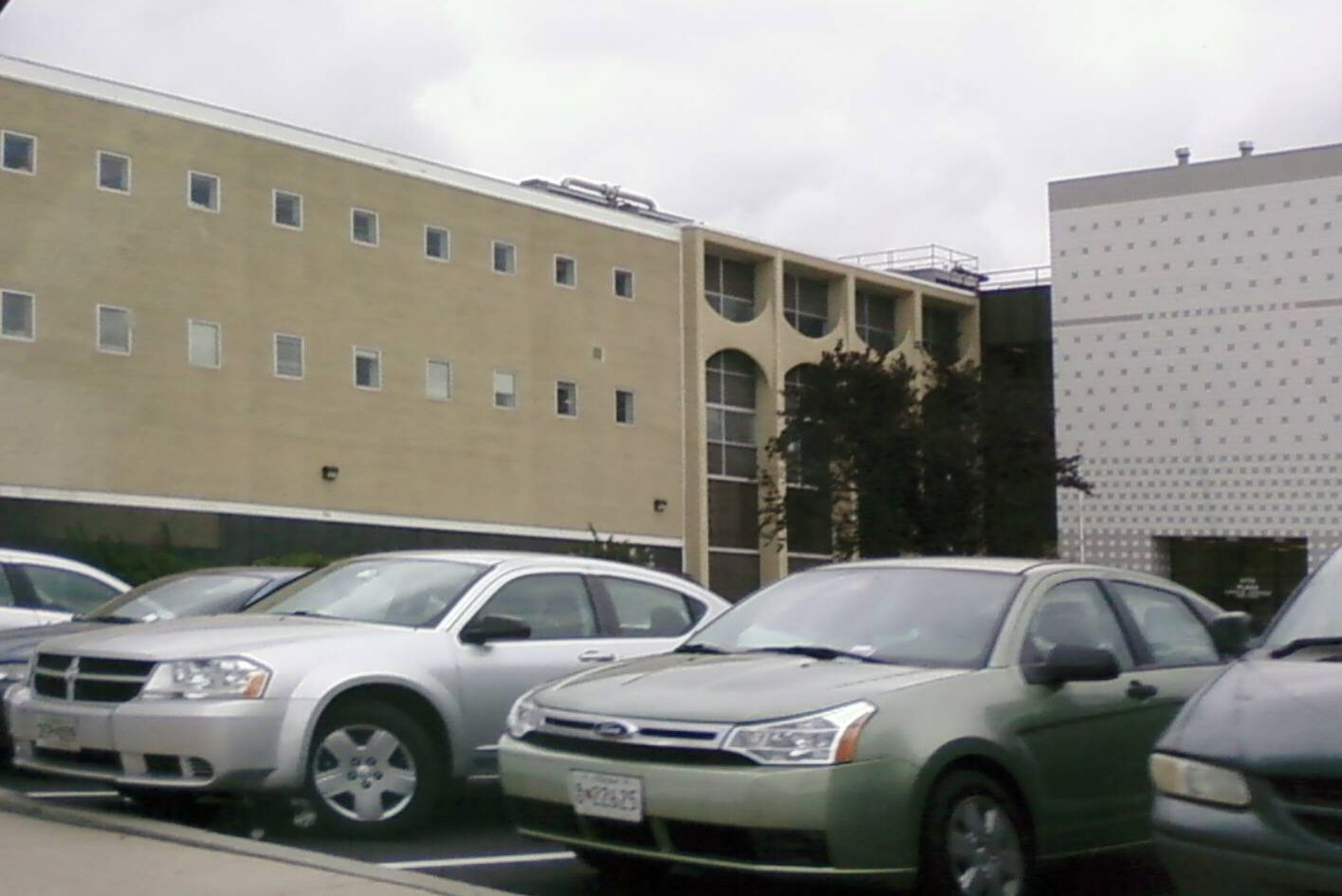
- Parking outside Reisterstown Road Plaza shopping center, located in the neighborhood of Reisterstown Station

- Location within Baltimore
- Coordinates: 39.3540°N 76.7054°W
- Country: United States
- State: Maryland
- City: Baltimore

Area
  - Total: 0.563 sq mi (1.46 km^{2})
  - Land: 0.563 sq mi (1.46 km^{2})

Population (2009)
  - Total: 2,010
  - Density: 3,570/sq mi (1,380/km^{2})
- Time zone: UTC-5 (Eastern)
  - Summer (DST): UTC-4 (EDT)
- ZIP code: 21215, 21208
- Area code: 410, 443, and 667

Reisterstown Station is a neighborhood in the Northwest District of Baltimore, located between the neighborhoods of Glen (northeast) and Grove Park (southwest). The Baltimore County line is the neighborhood's western border. Its other boundaries are drawn by Reisterstown Road (northeast), West Northern Parkway (southeast), Crest Heights Road (northwest), Patterson Avenue and Wabash Avenue (southwest).

Fallstaff Shopping Center is located in the northern corner of Reisterstown Station. Reisterstown Road Plaza, also known as The Plaza, is a mall located to the south of the smaller shopping center, along Reisterstown Road.

The Reisterstown Plaza Metro station, on Wabash Avenue near its intersection with Patterson Avenue, gives neighborhood residents quick access to Downtown Baltimore and Johns Hopkins Hospital or Owings Mills, Maryland.

Other MTA facilities on Wabash Avenue within the Reisterstown Station neighborhood include the Metro Operations, Systems Maintenance, Transportation & Maintenance and Railcar Maintenance offices and shops. These facilities maintain a rail yard along Wabash Avenue with 15 tracks, two maintenance shop buildings and a yard tower.

== Demographics ==
Reisterstown Station is a predominantly black neighborhood. Roughly 3/4 of the neighborhood's population is black. The rest is mostly white, with some Hispanic and Asian residents. A median income of $45,550 estimated for Reisterstown Station in 2009 compared favorably with the city median of $38,772.

== See also ==
- List of Baltimore neighborhoods
