= Vincent DePaul Lynch =

- Born: May 27, 1927; Niagara Falls, New York
- Died: March 15, 1984 (aged 56)

Academic background
- Education: Niagara University (BS); St. John's University (BS); University of Connecticut (MS, PhD)
- Thesis: 'The Effect of Certain Drugs on Avoidance-Escape and Operant Conditioning' (1959)

Academic work
- Discipline: Pharmacologist

Vincent de Paul Lynch (May 27, 1927 – March 15, 1984) was a pharmacology and toxicology professor at St. John's University from 1958 to 1984. He was appointed Chair of the Department of Pharmacognosy, Pharmacology and Allied Sciences (1961–1973), Chair of Pharmaceutical Sciences (1973–1982), and Chair of the Institutional Review Board (1974–1984). He also served as the director and founder of the school's Bachelor of Science Program in Toxicology (1967–1982), the first program of its kind in the U.S.

== Biography ==
Lynch was born in Niagara Falls, New York, to Arthur and Phoebe Lynch. Following his service in World War II, from 1944 to 1945, as a naval pharmacist's mate on the USS Providence (CL-82), he attended Niagara University in Lewiston, New York, and earned Bachelor of Science degrees in biology and chemistry in 1950. He then attended St. John's University in New York City where he earned a Bachelor of Science in pharmacology in 1954. In Connecticut, Vincent went on to earn his master's and PhD in pharmacology at the University of Connecticut in 1956 and 1959, respectively. His dissertation was entitled The Effect of Certain Drugs on Avoidance-Escape and Operant Conditioning. He returned to St. John's in 1958 as an assistant professor.

== Private life ==
Vincent married Vivian Tamburrino and moved to Connecticut. The couple had four children: Michael Joseph Lynch, Professor of Criminology at the University of South Florida; Stephen Vincent Lynch; Richard Anthony Lynch (author of nine books on Photoshop and photography, including The Adobe Photoshop Layers Book); and Laurie Anne Lynch. He also lived in Jericho, New York, from 1958 to 1970 and Laurel Hollow, New York, from 1970 to 1984.

== Career ==
Lynch was involved in many professional activities. He was the co-founder of the Society of Forensic Toxicologists (SOFT) in 1970, and founded SOFT's Educational Award Committee in 1978. He was an editor of the pharmacy section for the International Congress of Pharmacology in the years 1974 to 1984, co-editor of the Journal of Analytic Toxicology from 1981 to 1983, and a member of the editorial board of Research Communications in Substance Abuse from 1980 to 1984.

Lynch participated in a number of governmental organizations including as the Toxicological Examiner for the New York City Civil Service Commission in the years 1965 to 1984, with New York State's Drug Abuse Control Commission, the New York State Senate Committee on Crime in the years 1970 and 1971 and the New York State Assembly Committee on Health, also in 1970 and 1971. He served on the boards of the Blue Cross Blue Shield of Greater New York, New York State's Joint Legislative Committee on Drug Abuse, the board of directors of Queens Children's Hospital, the New York Metropolitan Transit Authority, Nassau County's Poison Control Center, New York City's Poison Control Center and on the Laboratory Board for the New York City Department of Health.

Between 1970 and 1982 Lynch delivered over 200 public lectures on substance abuse to elementary and high school students, at teacher training seminars and workshops, community organizations, colleges and to hospital staff, drug abuse task forces and many other groups.

In 1971 Lynch performed pharmacological tests on Lieutenant William Calley who was on trial for war crimes related to the My Lai massacre.

== Achievements ==
During his short career, Lynch published more than 50 journal articles and book chapters. He was among the first researchers to examine the use of inhalation therapy, which he did in 1960. From 1967 to 1972, Lynch held a grant from the United States Public Health Service which allowed him to establish the first Bachelor of Science program in toxicology in the United States. His research included the study of legal and illegal drug effects and toxicants, especially marijuana and alcohol, therapeutic enzymes and the presence of poisons, myocardial infarction and cardiopulmonary dynamics, and serum cholesterol.
