= William Chandler Shrubsall =

American murderer

William Shrubsall
- Born: William Chandler Shrubsall; February 3, 1971 (age 55); Niagara Falls, New York, United States
- Other names: Ian Thor Greene; Ethan Simon Templar MacLeod

William Chandler Shrubsall (born February 3, 1971), also known as Ian Thor Greene and now Simon Templar (Ethan Simon Templar MacLeod), is an American inmate who served 17 years of a life sentence in Canada having been declared a dangerous offender for a string of violent assaults against women.

== Early life ==
Shrubsall was originally from Niagara Falls, New York, the son of William and Marianne (Marge) Shrubsall. He excelled academically and was named valedictorian of the 1988 graduating class at La Salle High School. Shrubsall was planning to attend the University of Chicago after graduation to study pre-law.

=== Death of his mother ===
On June 25, 1988, twelve hours before he was to give his valedictorian speech, he beat his mother to death with a baseball bat. In his statement to police, Shrubsall stated that his mother got into a heated argument with him after he returned from his then-girlfriend's home. He said that his mother hit him several times and backed him down a hallway while threatening to kill him. Originally charged with second-degree murder, the charge was eventually reduced to manslaughter following a plea bargain. He was examined by a psychiatrist after his arrest who diagnosed Shrubsall as a psychopath and compulsive liar and said that he could not be cured. Niagara County Court Judge Charles J. Hannigan rejected Shrubsall's petition that he be granted youthful offender status and sentenced him to a minimum of five years in prison without parole. In 1990, Shrubsall was granted youthful offender status by the New York State appeals court.

=== Release and post-secondary education ===
He served 16 months for the death of his mother, as he was still a minor, and was released in March 1992. Prior to serving his sentence, Shrubsall attended Niagara University for two years. Upon his release, he attended and graduated from the University of Pennsylvania in 1994.

=== Further charges and fleeing ===
In April 1995, he was arrested for grabbing a woman's buttocks as she walked down the street. He pleaded guilty to a misdemeanor in that case.

In August 1995, Shrubsall sexually assaulted a 17-year-old female. On May 14, 1996, near the end of the trial, Shrubsall disappeared and left a suicide note claiming to have jumped into Niagara Falls. In reality, he fled the U.S. to Canada. He was later convicted of sexual abuse in absentia.

== Life as a fugitive ==
On May 16, 1996, only two days after fleeing the United States, Shrubsall showed up in Halifax, Nova Scotia, using the alias "Ian Thor Greene" while checking into a homeless shelter. During this time, he worked as a telemarketer, played on a baseball team, and attempted to enroll in high school.

In June 1997, Shrubsall attempted to hire a prostitute and was charged by police. He was fined $100 after pleading guilty. He used the alias Ian Thor Greene and was not properly identified by the police.

In August 1997, Shrubsall began renting a room at a fraternity house on South Street. He faked his student status with Dalhousie University and attempted numerous times to join the Sigma Chi fraternity, only to be denied each time. He manipulated a local congregation into paying his rent by claiming he had financial difficulties.

From February 5–22, 1998 (as per court documents), he stalked his ex-girlfriend. He was charged as Ian Thor Greene. He later was found guilty of criminal harassment in 1999. At that time, he was awaiting other charges and his true identity as William Chandler Shrubsall, American fugitive, was discovered. On February 12, 1998, Shrubsall robbed a Halifax sweater store, hitting a store clerk in the face with a baseball bat a dozen times. The store clerk was in a coma for five days and nearly died from her injuries. That same month, Shrubsall harassed an ex-girlfriend for three weeks, which eventually led to criminal harassment charges.

On May 4, 1998, Shrubsall sexually assaulted and robbed a woman in a Tower Road driveway after following her back from a nightclub. The woman's injuries were so severe that her contact lenses had to be surgically removed, her cheek bone was fractured, and her lip required 13 stitches.

On June 22, 1998, Shrubsall met a woman at a nightclub and walked her back to his room at the fraternity house. After the woman attempted to call a taxi to leave, he beat, choked, and sexually assaulted her. Two senior fraternity members were awoken by the disturbance and upon their intervention, Shrubsall fled the area. For a period of time after his apprehension, the Halifax Police Department as well as other law enforcement agencies were unable to determine the true identity of the individual known as Ian Greene.

=== Identification and arrest ===
Shrubsall was arrested after again fleeing the fraternity house upon police arrival and he subsequently identified himself as 19-year-old Ian Thor Greene. The police did not believe his story and a fingerprint search did not yield any results. Detectives searching his room discovered that he had the identification of two previous victims that he had attacked, and this was confirmed by witnesses.

Interrogators also questioned Shrubsall's stories and found no records to support them, leading them to realize that Greene was an alias, but he refused to divulge further details.

In July 1998, police issued an international plea to help identify Shrubsall, including airing the story on CBC's The National which aired in parts of upstate New York. He was eventually identified by the New York State Police.

=== Guilty verdicts and dangerous offender status ===
In February 1999, he was found guilty of criminal harassment of his ex-girlfriend. In May 2000, he was found guilty of aggravated sexual assault and robbery after a four-week trial in relation to the May 1998 incident.

In June 2000, he was found guilty of robbery, aggravated assault, and possession of a baseball bat in the commission of a crime in relation to the February 1998 incident.

In November 2000, he was found guilty of sexual assault in relation to the June 1998 incident. During the trial, Shrubsall testified that he assaulted the woman but he denied sexually attacking her.

A forensic psychiatrist diagnosed Shrubsall as a psychopath, saying that he separated women into two categories: "angels" and those that he would assault. The Crown, assisted by his former victims who had flown in to testify, had him declared a dangerous offender in December 2001, giving him no possibility of parole.

In 2002, while serving his life sentence, Shrubsall legally changed his name to "Ethan Simon Templar MacLeod" after the popular TV character.

=== Parole granted in Canada ===
The Parole Board of Canada granted Shrubsall parole in late 2018 on the condition that he was deported to his home country. Shrubsall was deported in January 2019. He will have to serve the 7-year sentence from the sex abuse in absentia conviction in New York. In 2021, he was given an additional 2 to 6-year sentence for bail jumping.

His victims, the Crown attorney, and the lead investigator raised concerns about his release. The provincial justice minister advised he will be writing a letter to the Canadian Attorney General of Justice because he has concerns about his release.

In December 2022, the New York State Division of Parole denied Shrubsall parole. Shrubsall tried to have his 2022 parole hearing overturned. On September 8, 2023, the New York State Supreme Court upheld the Parole Board's decision. In October 2024, the New York State Supreme Court rejected Shrubsall's appeal of their 2023 decision.

On October 21, 2016, Shrubsall was again denied parole.
