= 2008 Pittsburgh Steelers season =

Sixth Super Bowl Championship Season for the Pittsburgh Steelers

- Owner: The Rooney Family
- General manager: Kevin Colbert
- Head coach: Mike Tomlin
- Offensive coordinator: Bruce Arians
- Defensive coordinator: Dick LeBeau
- Home stadium: Heinz Field

Results
- Record: 12–4
- Division place: 1st AFC North
- Playoffs: Won Divisional Playoffs (vs. Chargers) 35–24; Won AFC Championship (vs. Ravens) 23–14; Won Super Bowl XLIII (vs. Cardinals) 27–23
- All-Pros: 3: James Harrison (1st team); Troy Polamalu (1st team); James Farrior (2nd team)
- Pro Bowlers: 3: ILB James Farrior; OLB James Harrison; SS Troy Polamalu
- Team MVP: James Harrison
- Team ROY: Patrick Bailey

The 2008 Pittsburgh Steelers season was the franchise's 76th season in the National Football League (NFL). The season concluded with the team winning Super Bowl XLIII to become the first franchise in the NFL with six Super Bowl titles.

The Steelers entered the season as defending champions of the AFC North Division, coming off a 10–6 record in 2007. Based on the previous season's results, the team faced the most difficult schedule in over 30 years; however, they were called Super Bowl contenders by ESPN. The Steelers opened their regular season on September 7, with a win over the Houston Texans en route to a 12–4 record, and a second straight AFC North Division title as well as a sweep of their division. In his second season as head coach Mike Tomlin was selected in fan balloting as the Motorola Coach of the Year. Linebacker James Harrison was named the NFL's Defensive Player of the Year after leading a defense which set the standard for the league in nearly every defensive category, including total yardage allowed, points allowed, passing yardage allowed, first downs allowed, yards per play, and yards per pass, among others. The playoffs began on January 11, 2009, with a win over the San Diego Chargers. The following week saw the third victory of the season over the Baltimore Ravens in the AFC Championship game and the advancement to Super Bowl XLIII where the Steelers defeated the Arizona Cardinals on February 1, 2009.

== Personnel ==
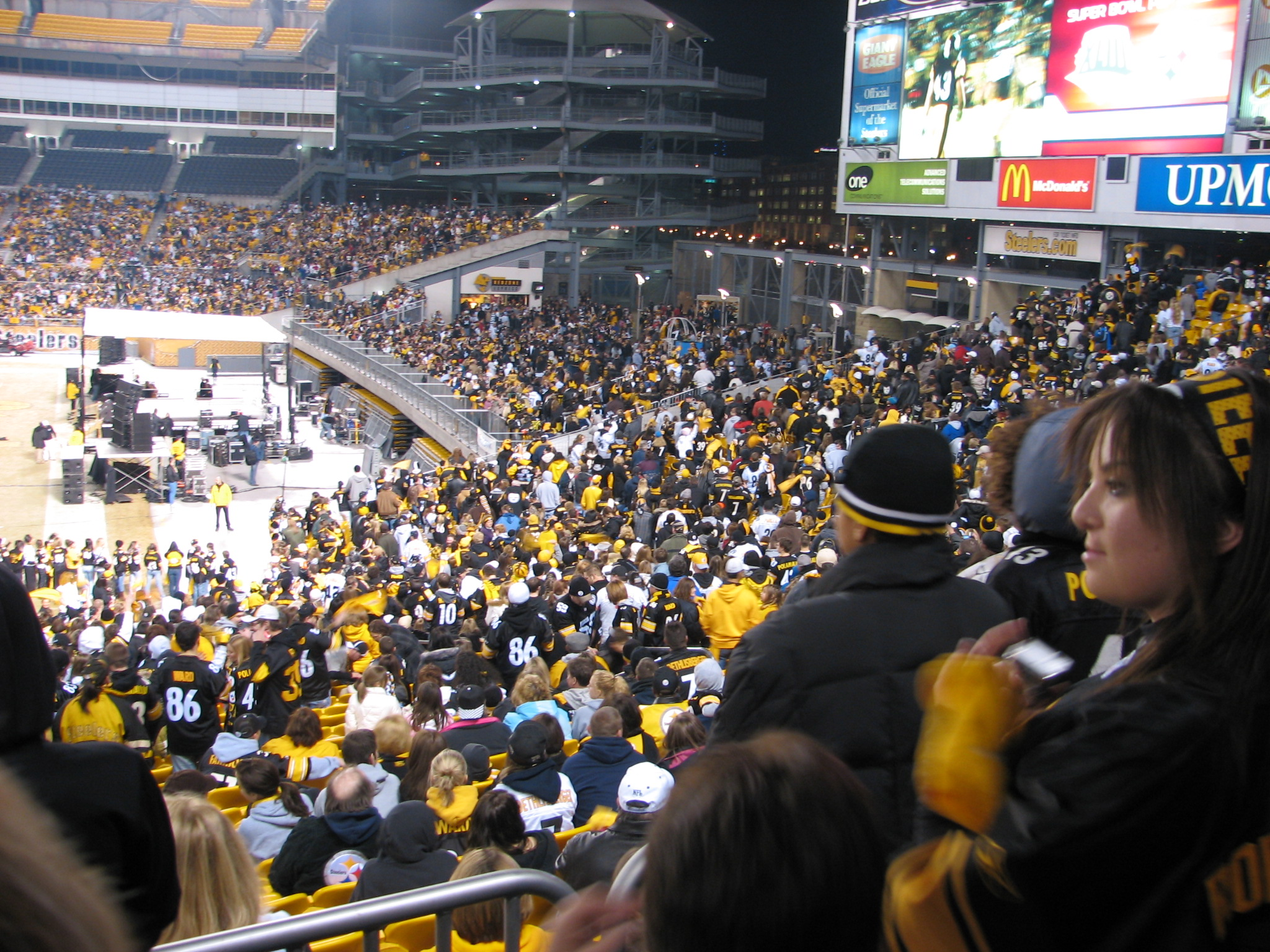
At the Super Bowl XLIII pep rally at Heinz Field.

=== Staff ===
2008 Pittsburgh Steelers staff
Ownership: Ownership – Rooney family; Front office: Chairman – Dan M. Rooney; President – Arthur J. Rooney II; Vice president – Arthur J. Rooney, Jr.; Administration advisor – Chuck Noll; Administrative assistant – Diane Lowe; Administrative assistant – Janet Rusnak; Business office; Director of business – Mark Hart; Controller – Bob Tyler; Business administration – Dan Ferens; Human relations/office coordinator – Geraldine Glenn; Business & football administration coordinator – Omar Khan; Assistant controller – Jodie Spagnolli; Administrative assistant – Rebecca Mihalcik; Administrative assistant – Kelly Serafin; Administrative assistant – Barbara Snyder; Media relations; Communications coordinator – Dave Lockett; Public relations/media manager – Burt Lauten; Administrative assistant – Emily Scerba; Intern – Jason Seidling; Community relations; Community relations manager – Michele Rosenthal; Administrative assistant – Stacie Lawrence; Photography; Team photographer – Mike Fabus; Photography intern – Danielle Hudak; Information technology; Information technology manager – Scott Phelps; IT/Network Support Technician – Jon Pugliano; Steelers.com/Steelers Digest; Editor – Bob Labriola; Assistant editor/website – Teresa Varley; Football operations; Director of football operations – Kevin Colbert; Pro personnel coordinator – Doug Whaley; College scouting coordinator – Ron Hughes; Special assistant/pro and college personnel – Joe Greene; Pro/college scout – Phil Kreidler; College scout – Mark Gorscak; College scout – Kelvin Fisher; College scout – Bruce McNorton; College scout – Dan Rooney; BLESTO Scout – David Petett; College personnel – Bill Nunn; Administrative assistant – Maureen Mannion; Administrative assistant – Karen Mercalde; Intern – Luke Palko; Head coaches: Head coach – Mike Tomlin; Assistant head coach/defensive line – John Mitchell; Offensive coaches: Offensive coordinator – Bruce Arians; Quarterbacks – Ken Anderson; Running backs – Kirby Wilson; Wide receivers – Randy Fichtner; Tight ends – James Daniel; Offensive line – Larry Zierlein; Offensive assistant – Harold Goodwin	Defensive coaches: Defensive coordinator – Dick LeBeau; Linebackers – Keith Butler; Defensive backs – Ray Horton; Defensive assistant – Lou Spanos; Special teams coaches: Special teams – Bob Ligashesky; Assistant special teams – Amos Jones; Strength and conditioning: Conditioning coach – Garrett Giemont; Conditioning assistant – Marcel Pastoor; Player development – Raymond Jackson; Administrative assistant – Chrissy Bulger; Administrative assistant – Mia Daudet; Medical staff; Physician, internal medicine – Dr. Mark Duca; Physician, internal medicine – Dr. Tony Yates; Physician, neurosurgery – Dr. Joseph Maroon; Physician, orthopedic surgery – Dr. James P. Bradley; Athletic training staff; Head athletic trainer – John Norwig; Assistant athletic trainer – Ryan Grove; Assistant athletic trainer – Ariko Iso; Football equipment staff; Equipment manager – Rodgers Freyvogel; Field manager – Rich Baker; Video; Video coordinator – Bob McCartney; Video assistant – Andy Lizanich; Video assistant – Jason McMann

== Roster ==
2008 Pittsburgh Steelers roster
Quarterbacks (QB): 2 Dennis Dixon; 4 Byron Leftwich; 7 Ben Roethlisberger; Running backs (RB): 38 Carey Davis KR; 21 Mewelde Moore; 39 Willie Parker; 33 Gary Russell; Wide receivers (WR): 10 Santonio Holmes PR; 14 Limas Sweed; 86 Hines Ward; 85 Nate Washington; Tight ends (TE): 49 Sean McHugh; 83 Heath Miller; 89 Matt Spaeth	Offensive linemen (OL): 69 Jason Capizzi T; 74 Willie Colon T; 79 Trai Essex G/T; 62 Justin Hartwig C; 66 Tony Hills T; 68 Chris Kemoeatu G; 65 Jeremy Parquet T; 72 Darnell Stapleton G; 78 Max Starks T; Defensive linemen (DL): 93 Nick Eason DE; 98 Casey Hampton NT; 76 Chris Hoke NT; 99 Brett Keisel DE; 90 Travis Kirschke DE; 71 Scott Paxson DE; 96 Orpheus Roye DE; 91 Aaron Smith DE	Linebackers (LB): 46 Patrick Bailey OLB; 53 Bruce Davis OLB; 51 James Farrior ILB; 50 Larry Foote ILB; 57 Keyaron Fox ILB; 54 Andre Frazier OLB; 92 James Harrison OLB; 94 Lawrence Timmons ILB; 56 LaMarr Woodley OLB; Defensive backs (DB): 31 Fernando Bryant CB; 23 Tyrone Carter FS; 25 Ryan Clark FS; 22 William Gay CB; 37 Anthony Madison CB; 20 Bryant McFadden CB; 43 Troy Polamalu SS; 27 Anthony Smith FS; 24 Ike Taylor CB; 26 Deshea Townsend CB; Special teams (ST): 17 Mitch Berger P; 3 Jeff Reed K; 61 Jared Retkofsky LS	Practice squad: 81 Dallas Baker WR; 64 Doug Legursky C; 30 Roy Lewis CB; 29 Ryan Mundy S; 15 Martin Nance WR; 84 Dezmond Sherrod TE; 28 Justin Vincent RB; 95 Donovan Woods LB; Reserve: 16 Charlie Batch QB (IR); 67 Kyle Clement DT (IR); 88 Jonathan Dekker TE (IR); 97 Arnold Harrison LB (IR); 55 Mike Humpal LB (IR); 34 Rashard Mendenhall (IR); 9 Daniel Sepulveda P (IR); 73 Kendall Simmons G (IR); 77 Marvel Smith T (IR); 60 Greg Warren LS (IR); Rookies in italics 53 active, 10 reserve, 8 practice squad

== Off-season ==
Entering the 2008 season, the Pittsburgh Steelers lost ten-year lineman Alan Faneca, after his contract expired, and he signed with the New York Jets. Allen Rossum, Jerame Tuman, and Clint Kriewaldt were released on February 22. The team also lost Dan Kreider, Verron Haynes, Brian St. Pierre, and eight-year veteran Clark Haggans to free agency.

The Steelers renewed quarterback Ben Roethlisberger's contract with an eight-year, $102 million agreement, the largest in franchise history. The team re-signed Max Starks to the largest single-year deal in franchise history, despite him not being a starter during the 2007 season. Nate Washington, Chris Kemoeatu, and Trai Essex also agreed to one-year deals. Seven-year center Justin Hartwig and running back Mewelde Moore were signed to multi-year deals, and linebacker Keyaron Fox agreed to a one-year deal. Entering the season, 14 players were in the final year of their contracts.

=== Draft ===
The 2008 NFL draft was held on April 26 and April 27, 2008, at Radio City Music Hall. In the first round, the Steelers selected running back Rashard Mendenhall, from the University of Illinois, with the 23rd overall pick. He was the first running back selected in the first round by the franchise since 1989. The Steelers selected Limas Sweed, from the University of Texas, in the second round. Sweed was ranked by the Steelers as one of the top three receivers in the draft. The drafting of Sweed came after quarterback Ben Roethlisberger's suggestion of acquiring a tall wide receiver; Sweed is 6-feet 4-inches in height. In round three, the Steelers selected Bruce Davis, of UCLA. Davis primarily played defensive end at his alma mater, however, he is expected to switch to linebacker at the pro level. The Steelers traded their fourth-round pick (123rd overall) to the New York Giants for the Giants' fourth and sixth-round selections, 130th and 194th overall, respectively. The Steelers selected offensive tackle Tony Hills with the 130th overall selection, in the fourth round. Like second-round pick Sweed, Hills came out of the University of Texas where he had been elected a captain of the football team during his senior season. With their fifth-round selection, the Steelers chose quarterback Dennis Dixon. Prior to an injury in 2007, Dixon was a Heisman Trophy candidate. The sixth round selection was the Steelers' second linebacker of the draft, Mike Humpal out of the University of Iowa. Also in the sixth round, the final selection of the team was safety Ryan Mundy, a Pittsburgh native. The Steelers did not pick in the seventh round, due to a 2007 trade with the Atlanta Falcons. Kevin Colbert, Director of Football Operations, said of the draft, "we’re happy with the way things turned out." Also stating that the first and second-round selections were players who the team expected to have already been chosen. Coach Mike Tomlin said that the Steelers tried to select skilled offensive "weapons" over a strong offensive line, which struggled the previous season. The following day, the Steelers signed twelve free-agent rookies. All draft picks agreed to terms by July 25, two days prior to the start of training camp.

2008 Pittsburgh Steelers draft
Round	Pick	Player	Position	College	Notes
1	23	Rashard Mendenhall	Running back	Illinois	
2	53	Limas Sweed	Wide receiver	Texas	
3	88	Bruce Davis	Linebacker	UCLA	
4	130	Tony Hills	Offensive tackle	Texas	
5	156	Dennis Dixon	Quarterback	Oregon	
6	188	Mike Humpal	Linebacker	Iowa	
6	194	Ryan Mundy	Safety	West Virginia	
Made roster

=== Mini-camp and OTAs ===
A mandatory three-day mini-camp was held in early May. Hines Ward, Aaron Smith and Troy Polamalu attended the camp, but did not fully participate because of injuries. First round draft pick, Rashard Mendenhall was welcomed by Steelers current running back Willie Parker. Parker was "surprised" when he heard a running back was selected in the first round, but hoped to work with Mendenhall like Jerome Bettis worked with Parker during his rookie season. During the mini-camp, the offense experimented with formations using Parker and Mendenhall in the backfield simultaneously. Receiver Hines Ward took a similar approach to Parker's in welcoming second round draft pick Limas Sweed. As with other receivers in the past, Ward was "very hands-on with Sweed throughout the weekend". Coach Mike Tomlin called the new draft picks "humble", adding that he liked their "spirit and attitude"; however, it was too early to tell how well they will ultimately perform.

The team held two Organized Team Activities (OTAs) prior to the draft, in addition to 12 throughout May and June. The OTAs were voluntary, however, most players did attend. Many players routinely worked on their conditioning and strength together, in addition to "informal" on field training. A week prior to the end of OTAs Mike Tomlin said he was happy with the team's progress during the sessions. Also stating, “We are having a productive off-season and that is what we are here for. We are here to get better individually and collectively and I think we are doing that.” Limas Sweed experimented on special teams play for the first time ever, with a concentration in punt blocking. On the day of the final OTA, June 12, Tomlin stated that while he was pleased with the progress of the team, no positions would be gained or lost based on the voluntary camp. Tomlin added, "it's been teach-oriented, it's been skill-develop-oriented. It's different than playing the game of football." The team was given 44 days off until the beginning of training camp.

=== Off-field activity ===
In May, ESPN The Magazine released the findings of its annual survey of over 80,000 fans entitled the "Ultimate Standings: Fan Satisfaction Ranking." The Steelers ranked as the 25th best major league sports franchise out of 122 Teams from MLB, NFL, NBA, and the NHL. The franchise finished one position behind the cross-town hockey team Pittsburgh Penguins. The Steelers were sixth among all NFL teams. In August, ESPN.com ranked Steelers' fans as the best in the National Football League, citing their "unbelievable" sellout streak of 299 consecutive games.

During the Pittsburgh Penguins run for the Stanley Cup multiple members of the Steelers showed support for the cross-town team. Ben Roethlisberger attended Stanley Cup Finals games in Detroit, where he and the Steelers won Super Bowl XL three years prior. Mike Tomlin watched Game Six of the finals outside Mellon Arena, along with 3,000 other fans, on a JumboTron which had been erected for fans unable to acquire tickets to the sold-out game. Kevin Colbert, Charlie Batch, and Tomlin attended many games throughout the regular season. In September, Penguins' coach Michel Therrien attended the Steelers' first game of the season.

On February 17, Ernie Holmes, who played for the Steelers from 1972 to 1977, was killed in a car crash. Ten days later, on February 27, award-winning journalist, Steelers radio announcer of 35 years, and inventor of the Terrible Towel, Myron Cope, died at age 79. On June 6, Dwight White, a defensive end on the Steel Curtain died from a blood clot. Upon his death, Dan Rooney called White, "one of the greatest players to ever wear a Steelers uniform." A pre-game ceremony was held in their honor prior to the first game of the season.

=== Training camp ===
Training camp was held at Saint Vincent College, in Latrobe, Pennsylvania, for the 42nd consecutive year. Players reported on July 27, practices commenced the following day and ran through August 17. Throughout the twenty three day span, seventeen included practices; making the camp one of the shortest in Steelers history. The camp was less demanding under Tomlin, who was in his second year as coach. "We are a veteran team in some areas. You have to approach it differently because of that," said Tomlin.

Pittsburgh looked to build on their defense, which was ranked first in the league throughout the 2007 season. At over thirty years in age each, all three starting linemen returned. First round draft pick, Rashard Mendenhall entered camp with expectations to make an impact on the team throughout his rookie season. Pittsburgh's Willie Parker, who returned after suffering a broken leg in the 2007 season, was expected to share the load with Mendenhall. On July 29, punter Daniel Sepulveda tore the ACL in his right leg and was placed on season-ending injured reserve. The Steelers acquired Paul Ernster later in the day as a possible replacement. After concluding practices at St. Vincent's, the Steelers began to practice at their facility on Pittsburgh's South Side. Tomlin called the camp "very productive".

== Preseason ==
We're ready. I know that I feel good, and I can speak for the team. We've been practicing, gone through the preseason, and it's time to put what we've been practicing to work.

— Willie Parker

Pittsburgh opened their pre-season schedule with a 16–10 victory over the Philadelphia Eagles. The Steelers scored on their first possession, after driving 80 yards on eight plays. Ben Roethlisberger's 19-yard touchdown pass to Santonio Holmes completed the drive. In the first quarter, Charlie Batch was removed from the game after breaking his clavicle. Jeff Reed converted three field goals from 20, 24, and 50 yards. Toronto's Rogers Centre hosted the second pre-season game; it was the first pre-season game Pittsburgh played in Toronto since 1960. Pittsburgh's starting offense played longer in the second game. Willie Parker increased his output over the first game by playing on third downs. However, the team failed to run the ball consistently and struggled on defense, losing the game 24–21. "We fell short essentially in all three phases," stated coach Tomlin after the game.

Pittsburgh traveled to Minnesota to play the Vikings for their third pre-season game. The Steelers's defense held the Vikings early, led by Aaron Smith who had three tackles, including one sack, in the first quarter. The offense failed to score a touchdown, with Rashard Mendenhall fumbling twice. Quarterback Byron Leftwich, who was signed to replace the injured Batch, lead the team with 129 yards passing. Jeff Reed accounted for all of the Steelers' points, kicking four field goals—the final with 4 seconds remaining—to give Pittsburgh a 12–10 victory. Entering their final pre-season game the Steelers had selected every starting player except the punter. Carolina tied the game with 1:54 remaining in regulation, but rookie Dennis Dixon led the Steelers on a 47-yard drive, which was capped with Reed kicking the game winning 43-yard field goal as time expired. After the three point victory, Tomlin stated, "It has been a pleasure working with this group of guys, but it is that time of year where we need to make tough decisions." The Steelers cut 22 players on August 30, to bring their roster to the required 53 player total. The following day the Steelers signed nine players from their pre-season team to the practice squad.

=== Schedule ===
Week	Date	Opponent	Result	Record	Game Site	NFL Recap
1	August 8	Philadelphia Eagles	W 16–10	1–0	Heinz Field	Summary
2	August 14	vs. Buffalo Bills	L 21–24	1–1	(Canada) Rogers Centre (Toronto, Ontario)	Summary
3	August 23	at Minnesota Vikings	W 12–10	2–1	Hubert H. Humphrey Metrodome	Summary
4	August 28	Carolina Panthers	W 19–16	3–1	Heinz Field	Summary

== Regular season ==
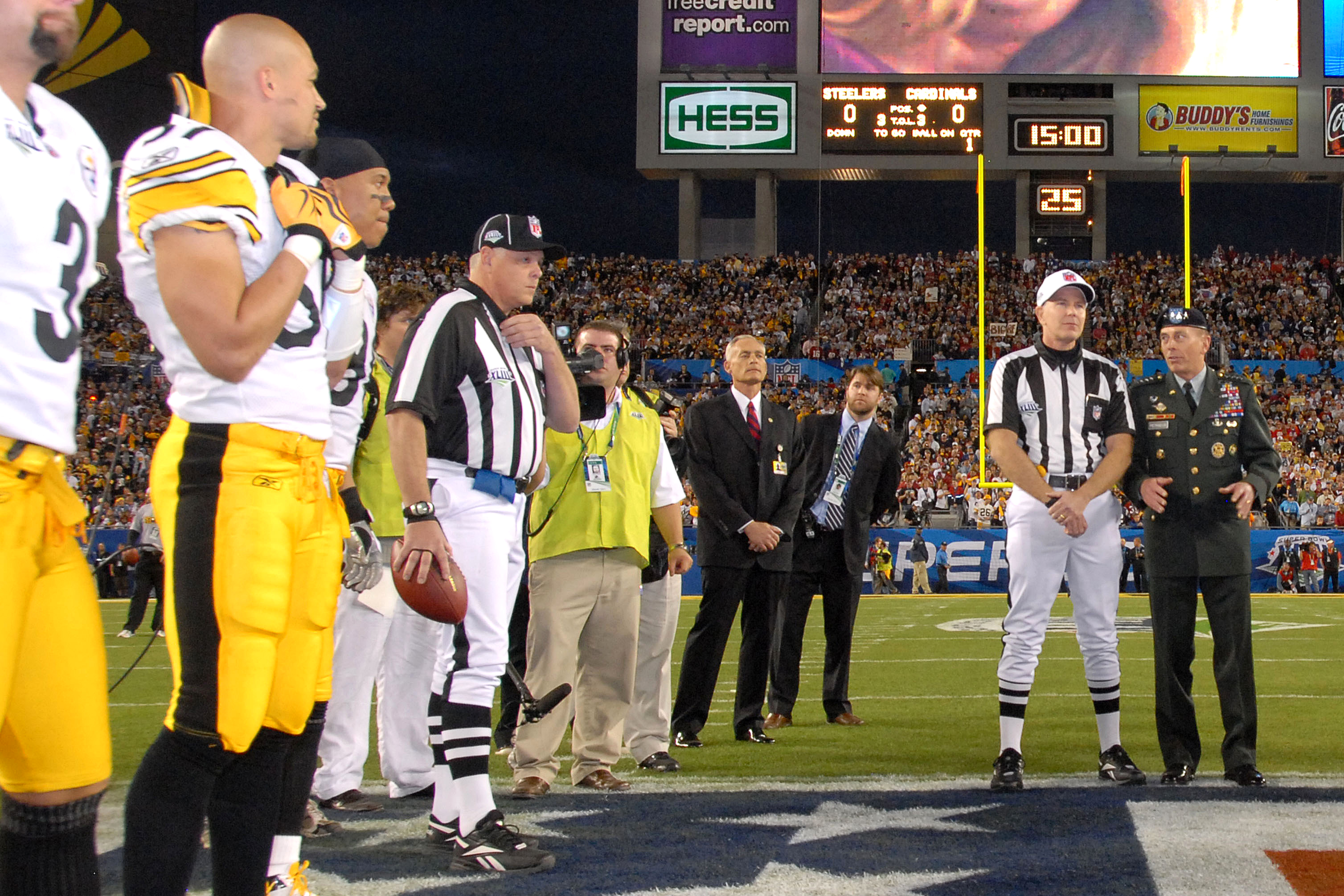
Steelers captains line up before kickoff at Super Bowl XLIII

Based on 2007 records, the Steelers boasted the NFL's most difficult schedule in 2008, with an opponent winning percentage of .598; ten games were played against teams that finished 2007 with winning records. The Steelers played each of the teams in the AFC North twice, once home and once on the road. The Steelers also faced the teams from the AFC South and NFC East divisions throughout the season. Pittsburgh's matchups included San Diego and New England, who each won their division in the 2007 season. The Steelers played five nationally televised primetime games, the maximum allowed number by the NFL.

Entering the first week of the season, players voted Ben Roethlisberger, Hines Ward, James Farrior, and Jeff Reed team captains. Farrior, James Harrison, and Troy Polamalu were voted to represent the Steelers at the 2009 Pro Bowl. James Harrison set the Steelers' franchise single-season record for sacks, surpassing Mike Merriweather's previous record of 15 sacks in 1984. Harrison also became the first undrafted player to win the NFL's Defensive Player of the Year Award. He was the fifth Steeler to win the award—the first since Rod Woodson in 1993. Harrison and Polamalu were also voted to the NFL's All-Pro team.

The Steelers' defense tied the 1973 Los Angeles Rams record by holding 14 consecutive opponents under 300 yards of total offense. The defense finished ranked first in the league in total and passing yards given up and second in rushing yards. For the fifth time in his career Hines Ward received for over 1,000 yards throughout the season. The team's offense ranked 22nd in overall offense, 17th in passing, and 23rd in rushing. Rashard Mendenhall was the team's only rookie to start a game; the fewest rookie starts of any team in the league.

=== Schedule ===
Week	Date	Opponent	Result	Record	Game Site	NFL Recap
1	September 7	Houston Texans	**W** 38–17	1–0	Heinz Field	Summary
2	September 14	at **Cleveland Browns**	**W** 10–6	2–0	Cleveland Browns Stadium	Summary
3	September 21	at Philadelphia Eagles	**L** 6–15	2–1	Lincoln Financial Field	Summary
4	September 29	**Baltimore Ravens**	**W** 23–20 (OT)	3–1	Heinz Field	Summary
5	October 5	at Jacksonville Jaguars	**W** 26–21	4–1	Jacksonville Municipal Stadium	Summary
6	Bye week					
7	October 19	at **Cincinnati Bengals**	**W** 38–10	5–1	Paul Brown Stadium	Summary
8	October 26	New York Giants	**L** 14–21	5–2	Heinz Field	Summary
9	November 3	at Washington Redskins	**W** 23–6	6–2	FedExField	Summary
10	November 9	Indianapolis Colts	**L** 20–24	6–3	Heinz Field	Summary
11	November 16	San Diego Chargers	**W** 11–10	7–3	Heinz Field	Summary
12	November 20	**Cincinnati Bengals**	**W** 27–10	8–3	Heinz Field	Summary
13	November 30	at New England Patriots	**W** 33–10	9–3	Gillette Stadium	Summary
14	December 7	Dallas Cowboys	**W** 20–13	10–3	Heinz Field	Summary
15	December 14	at **Baltimore Ravens**	**W** 13–9	11–3	M&T Bank Stadium	Summary
16	December 21	at Tennessee Titans	**L** 14–31	11–4	LP Field	Summary
17	December 28	**Cleveland Browns**	**W** 31–0	12–4	Heinz Field	Summary

Note: Intra-divisional opponents are in bold text.

=== Standings ===
The 2008 season was the Steelers' seventh as members of the AFC North Division. Pittsburgh defended their division title from the 2007 season, which they obtained by tying the Cleveland Browns' 10–6 record, but holding the tie-breaker with two wins over the Browns. Through 2008, Pittsburgh is the only team to have won the AFC North four times, since its inception prior to the 2002 NFL season. Entering the 2008 season, the Steelers were chosen to win the division by sportswriter Ron Borges, as well as nine of 13 analysts interviewed by ESPN.com. Four NFL.com analysts predicted that the Steelers would finish with a 10–6 record. The Steelers finished the regular season with a record of 12–4, going undefeated against opponents in the AFC North and winning 12 games for the fourth season since 1979. The team clinched the second seed in the AFC for the playoffs and received a bye the first week of the post-season. The Baltimore Ravens finished at second place in the AFC North with an 11–5 record, clinching a playoff seed as an AFC wild card. The Cincinnati Bengals finished 4–11–1, winning their final three games of the season. The Cleveland Browns finished in the AFC North's fourth position at 4–12; the team fired head coach Romeo Crennel after the season.

AFC North
	W	L	T	PCT	DIV	CONF	PF	PA	STK
^{(2)} Pittsburgh Steelers	12	4	0	.750	6–0	10–2	347	223	W1
^{(6)} Baltimore Ravens	11	5	0	.688	4–2	8–4	385	244	W2
Cincinnati Bengals	4	11	1	.281	1–5	3–9	204	364	W3
Cleveland Browns	4	12	0	.250	1–5	3–9	232	350	L6

=== Game summaries ===
==== Week 1: vs. Houston Texans ====
Week 1: Houston Texans at Pittsburgh Steelers – Game Summary

Quarter	1	2	3	4	Total
Texans	0	3	0	14	**17**
**Steelers**	7	14	14	3	**38**

at Heinz Field, Pittsburgh, Pennsylvania

- Date: September 7
- Game time: 1:00 p.m. EDT
- Game weather: Mostly cloudy, 74 °F (23 °C)
- Game attendance: 64,001
- Referee: Terry McAulay
- TV announcers (CBS): Gus Johnson and Randy Cross
- NFL Game summary, NFL Films highlights

Game information

**First quarter**

- PIT – Willie Parker 7-yard run (Jeff Reed kick), 5:44. Steelers 7–0. **Drive: 8 plays, 52 yards, 4:48.**

**Second quarter**

- PIT – Willie Parker 13-yard run (Jeff Reed kick), 11:10. Steelers 14–0. **Drive: 11 plays, 79 yards, 6:03.**
- PIT – Hines Ward 13-yard pass from Ben Roethlisberger (Jeff Reed kick), 9:03. Steelers 21–0. **Drive: 2 plays, 26 yards, 0:28.**
- HOU – Kris Brown 34-yard field goal, 4:29. Steelers 21–3. **Drive: 4 plays, −4 yards, 2:06.**

**Third quarter**

- PIT – Willie Parker 4-yard run (Jeff Reed kick), 9:10. Steelers 28–3. **Drive: 10 plays, 68 yards, 5:50.**
- PIT – Hines Ward 16-yard pass from Ben Roethlisberger (Jeff Reed kick), 2:04. Steelers 35–3. **Drive: 9 plays, 80 yards, 5:36.**

**Fourth quarter**

- HOU – Kevin Walter 14-yard from Matt Schaub (Kris Brown kick), 9:00. Steelers 35–10. **Drive: 8 plays, 57 yards, 4:14.**
- PIT – Jeff Reed 44-yard field goal, 5:24. Steelers 38–10. **Drive: 4 plays, 2 yards, 0:54.**
- HOU – Matt Schaub 4-yard run (Kris Brown kick), 1:14. Steelers 38–17. **Drive: 10 plays, 74 yards, 4:10.**

**Top passers**

- HOU – Matt Schaub – 25/33, 202 yards, TD, 2 INT
- PIT – Ben Roethlisberger – 13/14, 137 yards, 2 TD

**Top rushers**

- HOU – Steve Slaton – 13 rushes, 43 yards
- PIT – Willie Parker – 25 rushes, 138 yards, 3 TD

**Top receivers**

- HOU – Andre Johnson – 10 receptions, 112 yards
- PIT – Hines Ward – 6 receptions, 76 yards, 2 TD

The Steelers started their regular season against the Houston Texans, in front of 64,001 spectators at Heinz Field in Pittsburgh. The Steelers drove the ball 52 yards on their opening drive, with their biggest gain coming on a 17-yard run from quarterback Ben Roethlisberger. Willie Parker scored a touchdown at 5:44 of the opening quarter and added a second touchdown in the following quarter. After a LaMarr Woodley interception the Steelers extended their lead to 21 points when Roethlisberger completed a 13-yard touchdown pass to Ward. With 4:34 remaining in the half, former-Steelers' kicker Kris Brown converted a 34-yard field goal for Houston. Pittsburgh led the game 21–3 as time expired on the first half.

In the second half, Parker scored his third touchdown of the game—surpassing his touchdown total for the entire 2007 season—and was named the AFC offensive player of the week for his performance. Pittsburgh's defense held Houston to six yards on their ensuing drive and the Steelers drove 80 yards to take a 35–3 lead. The Texans scored two touchdowns in the final quarter, but Pittsburgh's James Harrison led the team with three sacks—forcing a fumble on the third—and the Steelers won their first game of the season starting out 1–0.

==== Week 2: at Cleveland Browns ====
Week 2: Pittsburgh Steelers at Cleveland Browns – Game Summary

Quarter	1	2	3	4	Total
**Steelers**	0	7	3	0	**10**
Browns	0	0	3	3	**6**

at Cleveland Browns Stadium, Cleveland, Ohio

- Date: September 14
- Game time: 8:15 p.m. EDT
- Game weather: Cloudy, 80 °F (27 °C)
- Game attendance: 73,048
- Referee: Tony Corrente
- TV announcers (NBC): Al Michaels, John Madden, and Andrea Kremer
- NFL Game summary, NFL GameDay highlights

Game information

**First quarter**

- No scoring plays

**Second quarter**

- PIT – Hines Ward 11-yard pass from Ben Roethlisberger (Jeff Reed kick), 6:29. Steelers 7–0. **Drive: 12 plays, 77 yards, 6:29.**

**Third quarter**

- PIT – Jeff Reed 48-yard field goal, 7:58. Steelers 10–0. **Drive: 5 plays, 54 yards, 2:18.**
- CLE – Phil Dawson 31-yard field goal, 1:25. Steelers 10–3. **Drive: 12 plays, 57 yards, 6:33.**

**Fourth quarter**

- CLE – Phil Dawson 38-yard field goal, 3:21. Steelers 10–6. **Drive: 14 plays, 60 yards, 7:29.**

**Top passers**

- PIT – Ben Roethlisberger – 13/20, 179 yards, TD
- CLE – Derek Anderson – 18/32, 166 yards, 2 INT

**Top rushers**

- PIT – Willie Parker – 28 rushes, 105 yards
- CLE – Jamal Lewis – 19 rushes, 38 yards

**Top receivers**

- PIT – Santonio Holmes – 5 receptions, 94 yards
- CLE – Kellen Winslow II – 7 receptions, 55 yards

The Steelers entered their first matchup with the Cleveland Browns having won 15 of the last 16 games between the two teams. Ben Roethlisberger started the game despite missing practice time during the week due to a shoulder injury suffered in Week One. The Steelers' defense held the Browns to 16 yards on their first four drives, as the teams played to a scoreless tie after the first quarter. After a Bryant McFadden interception the Steelers drove 70 yards and Roethlisberger connected with Hines Ward for their third touchdown combination of the season. Cleveland responded with a 14 play, 71 yard drive, but Troy Polamalu intercepted a Cleveland pass as time expired in the first half solidifying Pittsburgh's seven point halftime lead.

A 48-yard pass from Roethlisberger to Santonio Holmes and a 48-yard field goal from Jeff Reed on the team's second drive of the second half brought the score to 10–0. The Browns' Phil Dawson converted two consecutive field goals, to pull Cleveland within four points with 3:21 remaining. After a fourth down stop, Cleveland's offense took over with 26 seconds remaining, but failed to gain yardage as time expired. With the win, the Steelers increased their win streak over the Browns to 10 consecutive games—the longest current winning streak over a single opponent in the NFL. With the win the Steelers improved to 2–0 and led the AFC North by 1/2 a game ahead of the Ravens.

==== Week 3: at Philadelphia Eagles ====
Week 3: Pittsburgh Steelers at Philadelphia Eagles – Game Summary

Quarter	1	2	3	4	Total
Steelers	3	3	0	0	**6**
**Eagles**	0	10	0	5	**15**

at Lincoln Financial Field, Philadelphia, Pennsylvania

- Date: September 21
- Game time: 4:15 p.m. EDT
- Game weather: Mostly sunny, 79 °F (26 °C)
- Game attendance: 69,144
- Referee: Walt Anderson
- TV announcers (CBS): Jim Nantz and Phil Simms
- NFL Game summary, NFL Films highlights

Game information

**First quarter**

- PIT – Jeff Reed 37-yard field goal, 2:51. Steelers 3–0. **Drive: 12 plays, 61 yards, 6:39.**

**Second quarter**

- PHI – Correll Buckhalter 20-yard pass from Donovan McNabb (David Akers kick), 9:23. Eagles 7–3. **Drive: 13 plays, 85 yards, 8:28.**
- PHI – David Akers 31-yard field goal, 2:36. Eagles 10–3. **Drive: 7 plays, 32 yards, 3:18.**
- PIT – Jeff Reed 53-yard field goal, 0:13. Eagles 10–6. **Drive: 6 plays, 13 yards, 1:24.**

**Third quarter**

- No scoring plays

**Fourth quarter**

- PHI – Ben Roethlisberger intentional grounding penalty in end zone, 8:00. Eagles 12–6.
- PHI – David Akers 31-yard field goal, 2:26. Eagles 15–6. **Drive: 4 plays, 5 yards, 1:03.**

**Top passers**

- PIT – Ben Roethlisberger – 13/25, 131 yards, INT
- PHI – Donovan McNabb – 24/35, 196 yards, TD, INT

**Top rushers**

- PIT – Willie Parker – 13 rushes, 20 yards
- PHI – Correll Buckhalter – 10 rushes, 43 yards

**Top receivers**

- PIT – Heath Miller – 4 receptions, 63 yards
- PHI – Hank Baskett – 8 receptions, 85 yards

Pittsburgh's first inter-conference opponent of the season was the Philadelphia Eagles. The Steelers scored on their first drive, with a Jeff Reed field goal. The Eagles offense drove 85 yards to take the lead on a touchdown pass from Donovan McNabb to Correll Buckhalter. The Eagles defense sacked Ben Roethlisberger eight times throughout the game, two of which resulted in fumbles. Bryant McFadden intercepted his second pass of the season which allowed Reed to add his second field goal of the day—this one from 53-yards. The field goal brought the half time score to 10–6.

A third quarter diving Troy Polamalu interception, on Kevin Kolb's first NFL pass, was named a "Can't Miss Play" by NFL Network. The Steelers did not capitalize, punting two more times in the third quarter. The Eagles entered the final quarter leading 10–6, and added two more points when Roethlisberger was called for Intentional grounding while in the end zone. Roethlisberger was forced to leave the game after his hand was stepped on in the final quarter. Offensive coordinator Bruce Arians took responsibility for the offense's performance. "Anybody who wants anybody to blame for Philadelphia, you just blame me," Arians stated, "and then we can get ready for Baltimore." This marked the Steelers 7th loss in Philadelphia since 1965.

==== Week 4: vs. Baltimore Ravens ====
Week 4: Baltimore Ravens at Pittsburgh Steelers – Game Summary

Quarter	1	2	3	4	OT	Total
Ravens	3	10	0	7	0	**20**
**Steelers**	3	0	14	3	3	**23**

at Heinz Field, Pittsburgh, Pennsylvania

- Date: September 29
- Game time: 8:30 p.m. EDT
- Game weather: Clear, 63 °F (17 °C)
- Game attendance: 64,038
- Referee: Gene Steratore
- TV announcers (ESPN): Mike Tirico, Ron Jaworski, Tony Kornheiser, Michele Tafoya, and Suzy Kolber
- NFL Game summary, NFL Films highlights

Game information

**First quarter**

- PIT – Jeff Reed 49-yard field goal, 6:44. Steelers 3–0. **Drive: 11 plays, 40 yards, 6:41.**
- BAL – Matt Stover 33-yard field goal, 0:18. Tied 3–3. **Drive: 10 plays, 33 yards, 4:51.**

**Second quarter**

- BAL – Matt Stover 20-yard field goal, 3:48. Ravens 6–3. **Drive: 11 plays, 47 yards, 5:39.**
- BAL – Daniel Wilcox 4-yard pass from Joe Flacco (Matt Stover kick), 0:17. Ravens 13–3. **Drive: 6 plays, 31 yards, 1:35.**

**Third quarter**

- PIT – Santonio Holmes 38-yard pass from Ben Roethlisberger (Jeff Reed kick), 4:09. Ravens 13–10. **Drive: 4 plays, 59 yards, 1:40.**
- PIT – LaMarr Woodley 7-yard fumble return (Jeff Reed kick), 3:54. Steelers 17–13.

**Fourth quarter**

- PIT – Jeff Reed 19-yard field goal, 9:19. Steelers 20–13. **Drive: 7 plays, 60 yards, 4:44.**
- BAL – Le'Ron McClain 2-yard run (Matt Stover kick), 4:02. Tied 20–20. **Drive: 9 plays, 76 yards, 5:17.**

**Overtime**

- PIT – Jeff Reed 46-yard field goal, 8:55. Steelers 23–20. **Drive: 7 plays, 29 yards, 3:56.**

**Top passers**

- BAL – Joe Flacco – 16/31, 192 yards, TD
- PIT – Ben Roethlisberger – 14/24, 191 yards, TD, INT

**Top rushers**

- BAL – Le'Ron McClain – 16 rushes, 63 yards, TD
- PIT – Rashard Mendenhall – 9 rushes, 30 yards

**Top receivers**

- BAL – Derrick Mason – 8 receptions, 137 yards
- PIT – Santonio Holmes – 3 receptions, 61 yards, TD

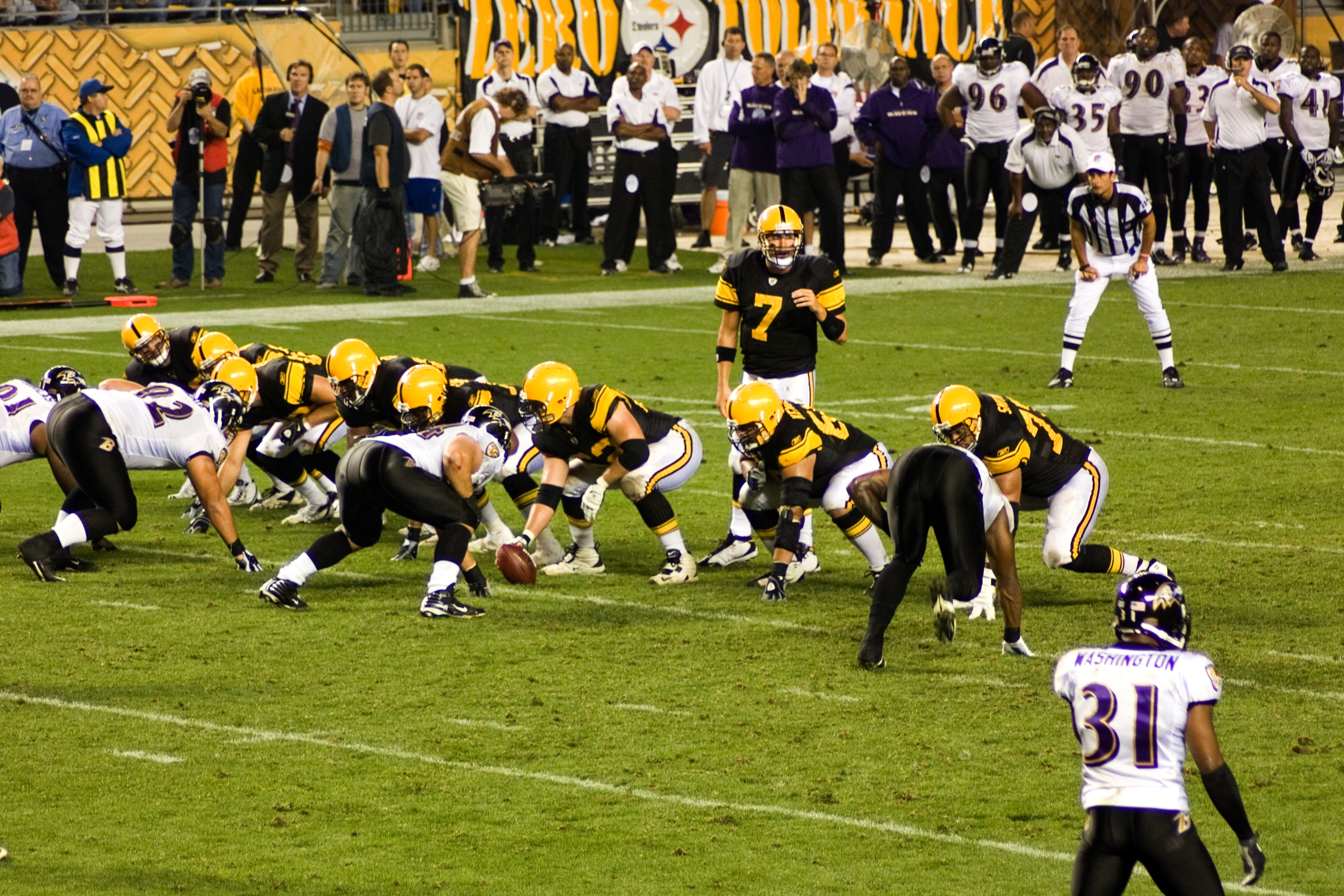
The Steelers' win against the Ravens was the team's 14th consecutive Monday night win at home.

Donning their throwback uniforms, the Steelers played the Baltimore Ravens in their first Monday Night game of the season. Multiple Steelers starters did not play in the game, due to various injuries. After a 3–3 first quarter, Baltimore took a ten-point lead into half time with a field goal and touchdown pass in the second quarter. Rashard Mendenhall—in his first NFL start—left the game in the third quarter with a season-ending shoulder injury. On Pittsburgh's third drive of the half, Roethlisberger connected with Santonio Holmes for a 38-yard touchdown pass. On the first play of Baltimore's ensuing drive, James Harrison's forced fumble was picked up by LaMarr Woodley and returned 7 yards for a touchdown. The two touchdowns within 15 seconds took the Steelers from ten points behind to four points ahead. In the final quarter, the Steelers' offense was stopped on the one yard line and Reed kicked his second field goal of the night. Baltimore drove 76 yards and tied the game with a touchdown. Neither team was able to score on their final drive as the regulation clock expired.

Baltimore won the overtime coin toss and elected to receive. The Ravens started the drive at their own 15 yard line. The Steelers held them for no gain on the first two plays and Lawrence Timmons sacked Flacco on third down. The Steelers took over after a punt and Mewelde Moore caught a 24-yard reception to bring the Steelers to Baltimore's 31-yard line. Jeff Reed converted a 46-yard field goal to win the game for the Steelers. Reed was named the NFL's special teams player of the week. With the win the Steelers passed the Ravens for first place in the AFC North at 3–1, as well as extending their all-time record of 14 consecutive home wins on Monday Night Football.

==== Week 5: at Jacksonville Jaguars ====
Week 5: Pittsburgh Steelers at Jacksonville Jaguars – Game Summary

Quarter	1	2	3	4	Total
**Steelers**	7	13	0	6	**26**
Jaguars	14	0	0	7	**21**

at Jacksonville Municipal Stadium, Jacksonville, Florida

- Date: October 5
- Game time: 8:15 p.m. EDT
- Game weather: Cloudy, 73 °F (23 °C)
- Game attendance: 65,908
- Referee: Ron Winter
- TV announcers (NBC): Al Michaels, John Madden & Andrea Kremer
- NFL Game summary, NFL Films highlights, NFL Game of the Week presentation

Game information

**First quarter**

- JAX – Rashean Mathis 72-yard interception return (Josh Scobee kick), 12:49. Jaguars 7–0.
- PIT – Heath Miller 1-yard pass from Ben Roethlisberger (Jeff Reed kick), 5:18. Tied 7–7. **Drive: 12 plays, 42 yards, 7:31.**
- JAX – Maurice Jones-Drew 1-yard run (Josh Scobee kick), 2:27. Jaguars 14–7. **Drive: 7 plays, 74 yards, 2:51.**

**Second quarter**

- PIT – Jeff Reed 38-yard field goal, 12:38. Jaguars 14–10. **Drive: 11 plays, 58 yards, 4:49.**
- PIT – Nate Washington 48-yard pass from Ben Roethlisberger (Jeff Reed kick), 9:20. Steelers 17–14. **Drive: 4 plays, 82 yards, 1:57.**
- PIT – Jeff Reed 23-yard field goal, 0:45. Steelers 20–14. **Drive: 10 plays, 66 yards, 2:07.**

**Third quarter**

- No scoring plays

**Fourth quarter**

- JAX – Marcedes Lewis 24-yard pass from David Garrard (Josh Scobee kick), 14:05. Jaguars 21–20. **Drive: 6 plays, 76 yards, 3:13.**
- PIT – Hines Ward 8-yard pass from Ben Roethlisberger (pass failed), 1:53. Steelers 26–21. **Drive: 11 plays, 77 yards, 4:40.**

**Top passers**

- PIT – Ben Roethlisberger – 26/41, 309 yards, 3 TD, INT
- JAX – David Garrard – 18/32, 200 yards, TD

**Top rushers**

- PIT – Mewelde Moore – 17 rushes, 99 yards
- JAX – Fred Taylor – 10 rushes, 19 yards

**Top receivers**

- PIT – Nate Washington – 6 receptions, 94 yards, TD
- JAX – Mike Sims-Walker – 6 receptions, 107 yards

The Steelers' matchup with the Jacksonville Jaguars—their first since the Jaguars knocked the Steelers out of the 2007 playoffs—was featured as the Pro Football Hall of Fame's Throwback Game of the Week. On the Steelers opening drive, Roethlisberger—who missed practice time during the week due to injections for his shoulder—was intercepted by Rashean Mathis who returned the ball 72 yards for a touchdown. Pittsburgh responded by driving 71 yards, with Heath Miller receiving a 1-yard touchdown pass to tie the game. Jacksonville re-gained the lead on the next drive when Maurice Jones-Drew ran for a touchdown. Pittsburgh took the lead in the second quarter with two field goals and a 48-yard touchdown pass from Roethlisberger to Nate Washington.

Jacksonville scored first in the final quarter with a touchdown pass from David Garrard to Marcedes Lewis. The Steelers drove from their 20-yard line in the fourth quarter, Ward received an 8-yard touchdown pass to put the Steelers up by 5 points with 1:53 remaining in regulation, however, the 2-pt conversion failed. Roethlisberger received the AFC offensive player of the week award for his 309-yard, 3 touchdown pass performance, despite having an injured throwing shoulder. The NFL selected the game as the league's Week Five Game of the Week.

==== Week 6: Bye Week ====
The Steelers used their bye week to rest injured players including Brett Keisel, Willie Parker, Jeff Reed, and Ben Roethlisberger. The team hosted an event to honor wounded veterans of Operation Enduring Freedom and Operation Iraqi Freedom at Heinz Field. Players signed autographs and held on-field drills with the veterans, while soldiers and Marines spoke of their experiences. Chris Hoke, who attended the event said, "These are the people who fight for us to have our freedom and be who we are as Americans. To come out here and spend a couple hours with them and hear their stories is unbelievable. There's nothing better than this."

==== Week 7: at Cincinnati Bengals ====
Week 7: Pittsburgh Steelers at Cincinnati Bengals – Game Summary

Quarter	1	2	3	4	Total
**Steelers**	10	0	7	21	**38**
Bengals	0	7	3	0	**10**

at Paul Brown Stadium, Cincinnati, Ohio

- Date: October 19
- Game time: 1:00 p.m. EDT
- Game weather: Sunny, 56 °F (13 °C)
- Game attendance: 65,860
- Referee: Ed Hochuli
- TV announcers (CBS): Kevin Harlan and Rich Gannon
- NFL Game summary, NFL Films highlights

Willie Parker was expected to return after missing two games, but aggravated his knee injury during a weekday practice and missed the game. Pittsburgh received the opening kickoff and drove 75 yards to open the scoring with a 2-yard touchdown pass from Ben Roethlisberger to Mewelde Moore to put the Steelers up 7–0. The Steelers' defense forced the Bengals offense into five consecutive three-and-outs, before the Bengals scored on their final possession of the opening half. The 5-yard pass from Ryan Fitzpatrick to Chad Johnson brought the Bengals within three points of the Steelers, who added a field goal from Jeff Reed.

Pittsburgh added their second touchdown of the game on their opening drive of the second half when Moore rushed to the left side for 13 yards. Cincinnati retaliated on their ensuing drive adding a field goal from Dave Rayner. The Steelers scored three consecutive touchdowns in the final quarter, while holding the Bengals scoreless. At 8:26 of the fourth quarter Roethlisberger connected with Nate Washington for a 50-yard touchdown pass. Pittsburgh's Moore scored his third touchdown of the day—his second rushing—and Hines Ward's 16-yard touchdown reception gave the Steelers 31 points to the Bengals' ten. Moore finished the game with 120 yards rushing, while Santonio Holmes lead the Steelers with 89 receiving yards.

==== Week 8: vs. New York Giants ====
Week 8: New York Giants at Pittsburgh Steelers – Game Summary

Quarter	1	2	3	4	Total
**Giants**	3	6	0	12	**21**
Steelers	7	0	7	0	**14**

at Heinz Field, Pittsburgh, Pennsylvania

- Date: October 26
- Game time: 4:15 p.m. EDT
- Game weather: Sunny, 59 °F (15 °C)
- Game attendance: 64,991
- Referee: Bill Carollo
- TV announcers (Fox): Dick Stockton, Troy Aikman, and Pam Oliver
- NFL Game summary, NFL Network highlights

Willie Parker missed his fourth game due to a knee injury. Santonio Holmes also missed the game after a "small quantity of marijuana" was found in his car and the team placed him on the inactive list. Mewelde Moore opened up the game's scoring with a 32-yard touchdown run on the Steelers opening drive. The 5–1 New York Giants responded with a field goal on the ensuing drive. Pittsburgh stopped the Giants on four consecutive plays from inside the Steelers 2-yard line to force a turnover on downs. But were unable to score when two Ben Roethlisberger interceptions and a punt lead to two more field goals in the second quarter for the Giants.

At 10:10 of the third quarter Roethlisberger completed a 65-yard touchdown pass to Nate Washington to give the Steelers a 14–9 lead. Later in the quarter, a Steelers 53-yard touchdown pass was negated due to a holding penalty and Pittsburgh was forced to punt. In the final quarter Pittsburgh kept New York out of the end zone on three plays inside the 10-yard line, however, the Giants connected on a field goal to bring the Giants to within two points. On the next drive, James Harrison—who was called in to replace injured long snapper Greg Warren—snapped the ball out of the end zone to give the Giants a safety and tie the game. The Giants drove after receiving the safety's kickoff to score a touchdown—taking a 21–14 lead with 3:07 remaining. Pittsburgh was unable to convert on their final two drives, as Roethlisberger threw his fourth interception of the day.

==== Week 9: at Washington Redskins ====
Week 9: Pittsburgh Steelers at Washington Redskins – Game Summary

Quarter	1	2	3	4	Total
**Steelers**	0	10	6	7	**23**
Redskins	6	0	0	0	**6**

at FedEx Field, Landover, Maryland

- Date: November 3
- Game time: 8:30 p.m. EST
- Game weather: Cloudy, 51 °F (11 °C)
- Game attendance: 90,512
- Referee: Carl Cheffers
- TV announcers (ESPN): Mike Tirico, Ron Jaworski, Tony Kornheiser, Michele Tafoya, and Suzy Kolber
- NFL Game summary, NFL Films highlights

The night before the United States presidential election, the Steelers played in the nation's capitol, Washington, D.C.; both major party candidates were interviewed at half-time. The Washington Redskins took a 6–0 lead in the first quarter with two field goals. The Steelers defense shut out the Redskins in the second quarter while the Steelers scored on a field goal to cut the lead in half. A blocked punt with 2:21 remaining in the half led to a Steelers 1-yard touchdown run from Ben Roethlisberger.

Due to an injury to Roethlisberger, Byron Leftwich took over as quarterback in the second half. Leftwich completed a 50-yard pass to Nate Washington on the opening drive of the third quarter; the Steelers capped the drive with a Willie Parker touchdown run. Pittsburgh extended their lead in the final quarter with a touchdown pass from Leftwich to Santonio Holmes. The Redskins gained 124 yards in the final quarter, but were unable to score. The Steelers' 17 point win took their record to 6–2 on the season.

==== Week 10: vs. Indianapolis Colts ====
Week 10: Indianapolis Colts at Pittsburgh Steelers – Game Summary

Quarter	1	2	3	4	Total
**Colts**	7	7	3	7	**24**
Steelers	7	10	0	3	**20**

at Heinz Field, Pittsburgh, Pennsylvania

- Date: November 9
- Game time: 4:15 p.m. EST
- Game weather: Cloudy, 38 °F (3 °C)
- Game attendance: 64,042
- Referee: John Parry
- TV announcers (CBS): Jim Nantz and Phil Simms
- NFL Game summary, NFL Films highlights

Both the Steelers and Indianapolis Colts drove more than 60 yards on their opening offensive drives, each scored a touchdown to bring the score to 7–7 after the first quarter. A Steelers 42-yard flea flicker advanced the ball to the 2 yard line. On the following play Mewelde Moore scored his second touchdown of the game. The Steelers extended their lead to ten, but an interception with 1:30 remaining in the half led to a Colts touchdown—bringing the halftime score to 17–14.

The Colts kicked a 36-yard field goal in the third quarter to tie the game at 17. A Steelers field goal in the final quarter gave them a three-point lead. The Colts scored on Peyton Manning's third touchdown pass of the game to take the lead with 3:10 remaining in regulation. The Steelers drove from their own 27 yard line to the Colts' 27 yard line, but a 4th down Hail Mary attempt from Roethlisberger was intercepted in the end zone as time expired.

The loss ended the Steelers 12-game home winning streak against the Colts, losing to them for the first time since the 1968 season.

==== Week 11: vs. San Diego Chargers ====
Week 11: San Diego Chargers at Pittsburgh Steelers – Game Summary

Quarter	1	2	3	4	Total
Chargers	7	0	0	3	**10**
**Steelers**	0	5	3	3	**11**

at Heinz Field, Pittsburgh, Pennsylvania

- Date: November 16
- Game time: 4:15 p.m. EST
- Game weather: Snow, 32 °F (0 °C)
- Game attendance: 62,051
- Referee: Scott Green
- TV announcers (CBS): Jim Nantz and Phil Simms
- NFL Game summary, NFL Films highlights

Pittsburgh entered week eleven with starters having missed 31 games due to injuries. The San Diego Chargers opened the scoring with the game's only touchdown, a three-yard LaDainian Tomlinson run, and held a 7–0 lead after the first quarter of play. On the second play of the second quarter, the Steelers' James Harrison forced a fumble in the endzone, then forced a safety by tackling Marcus McNeill after he had recovered the fumble. Jeff Reed converted on a field goal as time expired on the first half, pulling the Steelers within two points.

Reed kicked his second field goal of the game from 41-yards to give the Steelers the lead going into the final quarter. The Chargers drove 74 yards on 17 plays, converting on a field goal to give them the lead again, with 6:45 remaining. On the Steelers' ensuing drive, the offense drove 73 yards and Reed converted on his third field goal of the day, giving the Steelers an 11–10 lead with 15 seconds remaining in regulation. The Chargers attempted to score on their final play, but Troy Polamalu forced and recovered a fumble, returning it for a touchdown. The call was reversed when the officials ruled that San Diego had made an illegal forward pass. After the game, head referee Scott Green admitted that the touchdown should have been counted. With the touchdown not counted the final score kept Pittsburgh under the 5 point spread by which they were favored, and resulted in over $32 million being lost in bets. The game was the first regular season game in NFL history to end with a final score of 11–10.

==== Week 12: vs. Cincinnati Bengals ====
Week 12: Cincinnati Bengals at Pittsburgh Steelers – Game Summary

Quarter	1	2	3	4	Total
Bengals	7	0	0	3	**10**
**Steelers**	0	10	10	7	**27**

at Heinz Field, Pittsburgh, Pennsylvania

- Date: November 20
- Game time: 8:15 p.m. EST
- Game weather: Snow, 30 °F (−1 °C)
- Game attendance: 59,854
- Referee: Ron Winter
- TV announcers (NFLN): Bob Papa and Cris Collinsworth
- NFL Game summary, NFL Films highlights

The Steelers concluded their primetime schedule with their only Thursday night game of the season. The Cincinnati Bengals took a 7–0 lead in the first quarter after a 62-yard drive. In the second quarter the Steelers tied the game on a touchdown pass from Ben Roethlisberger to Heath Miller. Jeff Reed converted a field goal with 1:56 remaining in the first half to give the Steelers a 10–7 halftime lead.

Pittsburgh added another ten points in the third quarter when Gary Russell ran for his first rushing touchdown of the season, after Reed's second field goal. In the final quarter, Roethlisberger rushed for a touchdown to put the Steelers up by a score of 27–10. Roethlisberger passed for 243 yards and one touchdown, while Santonio Holmes led the game with 84 receiving yards. James Farrior led the Steelers with 8 tackles.

==== Week 13: at New England Patriots ====
Week 13: Pittsburgh Steelers at New England Patriots – Game Summary

Quarter	1	2	3	4	Total
**Steelers**	3	7	13	10	**33**
Patriots	7	3	0	0	**10**

at Gillette Stadium, Foxboro, Massachusetts

- Date: November 30
- Game time: 4:15 p.m. EST
- Game weather: Rain, 34 °F (1 °C)
- Game attendance: 68,756
- Referee: Ed Hochuli
- TV announcers (CBS): Greg Gumbel and Dan Dierdorf
- NFL Game summary, NFL Films highlights

The Steelers fell behind the New England Patriots less than three minutes into the first quarter, after an interception of Ben Roethlisberger was driven to the endzone. The Steelers came back with 2:55 remaining in the initial quarter to convert on a 20-yard Jeff Reed field goal. The Patriots extended their lead to seven points with a 29-yard field goal in the second quarter. Pittsburgh drove 63 yards on nine plays, capping their drive with a touchdown pass to Santonio Holmes to tie the game at ten points at the halfway point.

Pittsburgh took their first lead of the game on their first drive of the second half, after Reed's second field goal put them up by three points. On the ensuing kickoff the Steelers recovered a Patriots' fumble and Roethlisberger connected with Hines Ward for an 11-yard touchdown pass. James Harrison forced his first of two fumbles on the Patriots' next drive and the Steelers recovered as Reed added his third field goal of the game—putting the Steelers up 23–10. Gary Russell scored a touchdown after Lawrence Timmons returned an interception 89 yards to the Patriots' one-yard line. With the win, the Steelers improved to 9–3. This would mark their last win in Foxborough until 2025.

==== Week 14: vs. Dallas Cowboys ====
Week 14: Dallas Cowboys at Pittsburgh Steelers – Game Summary

Quarter	1	2	3	4	Total
Cowboys	0	3	10	0	**13**
**Steelers**	0	3	0	17	**20**

at Heinz Field, Pittsburgh, Pennsylvania

- Date: December 7
- Game time: 4:15 p.m. EST
- Game weather: Partly cloudy, 18 °F (−8 °C)
- Game attendance: 60,594
- Referee: Alberto Riveron
- TV announcers (Fox): Joe Buck, Troy Aikman, and Pam Oliver
- NFL Game summary, NFL Films highlights

The Dallas Cowboys and the Steelers held each other scoreless in the first quarter. Troy Polamalu intercepted a pass in his fourth consecutive game, overall he led the league with seven interceptions. The Steelers scored first on a 24-yard field goal from Jeff Reed with 2:44 remaining in the second quarter. The Cowboys converted a 44-yard field goal as time expired on the first half to tie the game at 3–3.

A Tony Romo touchdown pass in the third quarter gave the Cowboys their first lead of the game. The lead was extended when Nick Folk converted his second field goal of the day, putting the Cowboys up 13–3 as the game entered the final quarter. Reed converted his second field goal of the game, bringing the Steelers within seven points with 7:20 remaining in regulation. On the Steelers next drive, Ben Roethelisberger threw a touchdown pass to Heath Miller—tying the game with 2:04 remaining. Two plays later Deshea Townsend intercepted Romo's next pass and returned the ball 25 yards, scoring a touchdown to give the Steelers a seven-point lead, which they held to the end of the game.

==== Week 15: at Baltimore Ravens ====
Week 15: Pittsburgh Steelers at Baltimore Ravens – Game Summary

Quarter	1	2	3	4	Total
**Steelers**	0	3	0	10	**13**
Ravens	0	6	3	0	**9**

at M&T Bank Stadium, Baltimore, Maryland

- Date: December 14
- Game time: 4:15 p.m. EST
- Game weather: Mostly cloudy, 45 °F (7 °C)
- Game attendance: 71,502
- Referee: Walt Coleman
- TV announcers (CBS): Jim Nantz and Phil Simms
- NFL Game summary, NFL Films highlights

Entering their second game of the season against Baltimore, the Steelers' defense ranked first in the league, while the Ravens' defense ranked second. "We're going to win by any means necessary. If the defense has to score, if the special teams have to kick in a score, or if the offense has to score 50 points – whatever it takes to win," stated James Harrison prior to the game.

Both teams were held scoreless before a record crowd at M&T Bank Stadium until a Baltimore field goal gave the Ravens a 3–0 lead at 12:34 of the second quarter. Pittsburgh tied the game on a Jeff Reed field goal; Matt Stover converted a second time to give the Ravens a three-point lead at halftime. Stover kicked his third field goal of the game in the third quarter, extending their lead to six points. In the final quarter, Reed kicked his second field goal of the game to put the Steelers within three points. On the Steelers final drive of the game, the offense drove 92 yards over 2:53, with Ben Roethlisberger completing a touchdown pass to Santonio Holmes with 50 seconds remaining. The Ravens embarked on one more drive, but the Steelers second interception of the game prevented them from scoring. With the victory the Steelers won their second consecutive AFC North title and clinched a first round bye and became the first AFC franchise to amass 550 wins.

==== Week 16: at Tennessee Titans ====
Week 16: Pittsburgh Steelers at Tennessee Titans – Game Summary

Quarter	1	2	3	4	Total
Steelers	0	7	7	0	**14**
**Titans**	0	10	7	14	**31**

at LP Field, Nashville, Tennessee

- Date: December 21
- Game time: 1:00 p.m. EST
- Game weather: Sunny, 29 °F (−2 °C)
- Game attendance: 69,143
- Referee: John Parry
- TV announcers (CBS): Jim Nantz and Phil Simms
- NFL Game summary, NFL Films highlights

Pittsburgh entered their final road game of the regular season with a chance to surpass the Tennessee Titans for the top seed in the AFC. The Steelers and the Titans were scoreless after the first quarter, when Tennessee took a 3–0 lead on the second play of the second quarter. Justin Gage's 34-yard reception later in the quarter extended the lead to 10–0. Pittsburgh's Santonio Holmes also received a touchdown pass in the second quarter, bringing the halftime score to 10–7.

In the second half, Ben Roethlisberger threw his second touchdown pass of the game—to Hines Ward—to give the Steelers their only lead of the game. After a 21-yard touchdown run on Tennessee's ensuing drive, the Titans entered the final quarter with a three-point lead. The Titans scored two touchdowns in the final quarter, and the Steelers were unable overcome two Roethlisberger fumbles and two interceptions throughout the game.

==== Week 17: vs. Cleveland Browns ====
Week 17: Cleveland Browns at Pittsburgh Steelers – Game Summary

Quarter	1	2	3	4	Total
Browns	0	0	0	0	**0**
**Steelers**	0	14	3	14	**31**

at Heinz Field, Pittsburgh, Pennsylvania

- Date: December 28
- Game time: 1:00 p.m. EST
- Game weather: Sunny, 45 °F (7 °C)
- Game attendance: 63,553
- Referee: Jeff Triplette
- TV announcers (CBS): Gus Johnson and Steve Tasker
- NFL Game summary, NFL Films highlights

Game information

**First quarter**

- No scoring plays

**Second quarter**

- PIT – Willie Parker 34-yard run (Jeff Reed kick), 4:15. Steelers 7–0. **Drive: 3 plays, 57 yards, 1:28.**
- PIT – Byron Leftwich 8-yard run (Jeff Reed kick), 0:40. Steelers 14–0. **Drive: 10 plays, 52 yards, 2:00.**

**Third quarter**

- PIT – Jeff Reed 22-yard field goal, 5:39. Steelers 17–0. **Drive: 4 plays, 7 yards, 2:01.**

**Fourth quarter**

- PIT – Gary Russell 3-yard run (Jeff Reed kick), 9:45. Steelers 24–0. **Drive: 12 plays, 66 yards, 7:23.**
- PIT – Tyrone Carter 32-yard interception return (Jeff Reed kick), 8:52. Steelers 31–0.

**Top passers**

- CLE – Bruce Gradkowski – 5/16, 18 yards, 2 INT
- PIT – Ben Roethlisberger – 9/14, 110 yards, INT

**Top rushers**

- CLE – Jamal Lewis – 23 rushes, 94 yards
- PIT – Willie Parker – 23 rushes, 116 yards, TD

**Top receivers**

- CLE – Donté Stallworth – 1 reception, 12 yards
- PIT – Hines Ward – 6 receptions, 70 yards

Although guaranteed the second seed in the AFC Tomlin stated, "It is a big week for us." Willie Parker's 34-yard touchdown run in the second quarter was the Steelers longest run of the season. With less than two minutes left in the first half, Ben Roethlisberger was hit by D'Qwell Jackson and Willie McGinist and had to be immobilized and carried off the field after suffering from a concussion. Byron Leftwich replaced Roethlisberger and scored the Steelers second touchdown of the game to give the Steelers a 14–0 lead at halftime.

Pittsburgh scored the only points of the third quarter when Jeff Reed converted his sole field goal attempt of the game. The Steelers added two touchdowns in the final quarter—on a Gary Russell rush and Tyrone Carter's return of his second interception of the game. "We were so upset we had to practice on Christmas, we had to take it out on the Browns," said Larry Foote after the victory.

=== Stats ===
Passing

Rushing

Receiving

Kicking

Punting

Kick Return

Punt Return

Defense & Fumbles

Scoring Summary

Team

Quarter-by-quarter

Quarter-by-quarter
	1	2	3	4	OT	T
**Steelers**	47	106	87	104	3	347
**Opponents**	54	65	29	75	0	223

== Postseason ==
Their 12–4 regular season record gave the Steelers a second-place finish in the AFC. Along with the Tennessee Titans, who finished with the best record in the AFC, the Steelers received a bye during the opening week of the post-season. The 2008 season was the seventh of the past 16 that the Steelers were the first or second seed in the AFC entering the playoffs—never winning the Super Bowl during those seasons. Pittsburgh defeated the San Diego Chargers in the Divisional round, giving up a franchise post-season low of 15 Rushing yards. The victory was head coach Mike Tomlin's first in the post-season. The Steelers defeated the Baltimore Ravens in the AFC Championship Game. The Steelers won Super Bowl XLIII over the NFC Champion Arizona Cardinals on February 1.

=== Schedule ===
Week	Date	Opponent	Result	Game Site	NFL Recap
Wild Card	Bye Week				
Divisional	January 11, 2009	San Diego Chargers	W 35–24	Heinz Field	Summary
Conference	January 18, 2009	Baltimore Ravens	W 23–14	Heinz Field	Summary
Super Bowl	February 1, 2009	vs. Arizona Cardinals	W 27–23	Raymond James Stadium	Summary

=== Game summaries ===
==== Wild Card round: Bye week ====
The team rested on December 29—the day following their final regular-season game. They began preparations for their first post-season game on Tuesday, December 30 through Thursday, January 1, before three days of weekend rest. Roethlisberger did not practice until Monday, January 5—Tomlin stated of the injury, "We will proceed slowly with him because we have that luxury. But we feel comfortable with where he is relative to Sunday and where he’s capable of being next week." Although the January 1 practice was expected to be normal, Tomlin allowed players to leave after team meetings and a walk-through. Multiple Steelers stated that they would watch the games of the wild-card round. Some including James Farrior and Ryan Clark watched as fans; however, Chris Hoke said, "I will be watching the guys I am going against... That is how I watch it."

==== AFC Divisional Round: vs. San Diego Chargers ====
AFC Divisional Round: San Diego Chargers at Pittsburgh Steelers – Game Summary

Quarter	1	2	3	4	Total
Chargers	7	3	0	14	24
Steelers	7	7	7	14	35

at Heinz Field, Pittsburgh, Pennsylvania

- Date: January 11, 2009
- Game time: 4:45 p.m. EST
- Game weather: Light snow, 21 °F (−6 °C)
- Game attendance: 63,899
- Referee: Bill Leavy
- TV announcers (CBS): Jim Nantz and Phil Simms
- NFL Game summary, NFL Films highlights

Game information

First quarter

- SD – Vincent Jackson 41-yard pass from Philip Rivers (Nate Kaeding kick), 12:59. Chargers 7–0. Drive: 4 plays, 75 yards, 2:01.
- PIT – Santonio Holmes 67-yard punt return (Jeff Reed kick), 7:41. Tied 7–7.

Second quarter

- SD – Nate Kaeding 42-yard field goal, 1:56. Chargers 10–7. Drive: 7 plays, 20 yards, 3:09.
- PIT – Willie Parker 3-yard run (Jeff Reed kick), 0:40. Steelers 14–10. Drive: 7 plays, 66 yards, 1:16.

Third quarter

- PIT – Heath Miller 8-yard pass from Ben Roethlisberger (Jeff Reed kick), 7:04. Steelers 21–10. Drive: 13 plays, 77 yards, 7:56.

Fourth quarter

- PIT – Gary Russell 1-yard run (Jeff Reed kick), 12:52. Steelers 28–10. Drive: 2 plays, 49 yards, 0:49.
- SD – Legedu Naanee 4-yard pass from Philip Rivers (Nate Kaeding kick), 9:09. Steelers 28–17. Drive: 9 plays, 72 yards, 4:58.
- PIT – Willie Parker 16-yard run (Jeff Reed kick), 4:11. Steelers 35–17. Drive: 9 plays, 72 yards, 4:58.
- SD – Darren Sproles 62-yard pass from Philip Rivers (Nate Kaeding kick), 1:53. Steelers 35–24. Drive: 4 plays, 79 yards, 0:50.

Top passers

- SD – Philip Rivers – 21/35, 308 yards, 3 TD, INT
- PIT – Ben Roethlisberger – 17/26, 181 yards, TD

Top rushers

- SD – Darren Sproles – 11 rushes, 15 yards
- PIT – Willie Parker – 27 rushes, 146 yards, 2 TD

Top receivers

- SD – Darren Sproles – 5 receptions, 91 yards, TD
- PIT – Hines Ward – 4 receptions, 70 yards

Pittsburgh hosted the San Diego Chargers at Heinz Field due to the Chargers' overtime victory over the Indianapolis Colts during the wild-card round. The Chargers scored on the game's first drive with a 41-yard pass from Philip Rivers to Vincent Jackson for a touchdown. After the Steelers defense stopped the Chargers on their next drive, Pittsburgh's Santonio Holmes returned a punt 67 yards to tie the game at seven. With two minutes remaining in the first half Nate Kaeding converted a 42-yard field goal to reclaim the lead for the Chargers. Pittsburgh's offense responded with a 7 play, 66 yard drive in 1:33 to take their first lead of the game after a 3-yard touchdown run from Willie Parker.

The Steelers opened the second half with a 7:56, 13 play drive which concluded with Ben Roethlisberger's sole touchdown pass to Heath Miller. San Diego had one offensive play in the third quarter, which resulted in an interception. The Steelers entered the final quarter with a 21–10 lead. Gary Russell scored on a 1-yard touchdown rush to extend the Steelers lead. The Chargers scored on their next possession, when Legedu Naanee received Rivers' second touchdown pass of the game to conclude a 73-yard drive. With 4:17 remaining Willie Parker scored his second touchdown of the game—with a 16-yard run. The Chargers' Darren Sproles concluded the game's scoring with a 62-yard touchdown reception, bringing the final score to 35–24.

==== AFC Championship: vs. Baltimore Ravens ====
AFC Championship Game: Baltimore Ravens at Pittsburgh Steelers – Game Summary

Quarter	1	2	3	4	Total
Ravens	0	7	0	7	14
Steelers	6	7	3	7	23

at Heinz Field, Pittsburgh, Pennsylvania

- Date: January 18, 2009
- Game time: 6:30 p.m. EST
- Game weather: Light snow, 23 °F (−5 °C)
- Game attendance: 65,350
- Referee: Bill Carollo
- TV announcers (CBS): Jim Nantz, Phil Simms, and Steve Tasker
- NFL Game summary, NFL Films highlights

Game information

First quarter

- PIT – Jeff Reed 34-yard field goal, 11:22. Steelers 3–0. Drive: 7 plays, 55 yards, 3:32.
- PIT – Jeff Reed 42-yard field goal, 6:11. Steelers 6–0. Drive: 7 plays, 11 yards, 1:11.

Second quarter

- PIT – Santonio Holmes 65-yard pass from Ben Roethlisberger (Jeff Reed kick), 13:58. Steelers 13–0. Drive: 3 plays, 66 yards, 1:02.
- BAL – Willis McGahee 3-yard run (Matt Stover kick), 2:40. Steelers 13–7. Drive: 3 plays, 4 yards, 0:57.

Third quarter

- PIT – Jeff Reed 46-yard field goal, 3:38. Steelers 16–7. Drive: 11 plays, 46 yards, 5:29.

Fourth quarter

- BAL – Willis McGahee 1-yard run (Matt Stover kick), 9:29. Steelers 16–14. Drive: 6 plays, 48 yards, 3:09.
- PIT – Troy Polamalu 40-yard interception return (Jeff Reed kick), 4:24. Steelers 23–14.

Top passers

- BAL – Joe Flacco – 13/30, 141 yards, 3 INT
- PIT – Ben Roethlisberger – 16/33, 255 yards, TD

Top rushers

- BAL – Willis McGahee – 20 rushes, 60 yards, 2 TD
- PIT – Willie Parker – 24 rushes, 47 yards

Top receivers

- BAL – Ray Rice – 3 receptions, 43 yards
- PIT – Santonio Holmes – 2 receptions, 70 yards, TD

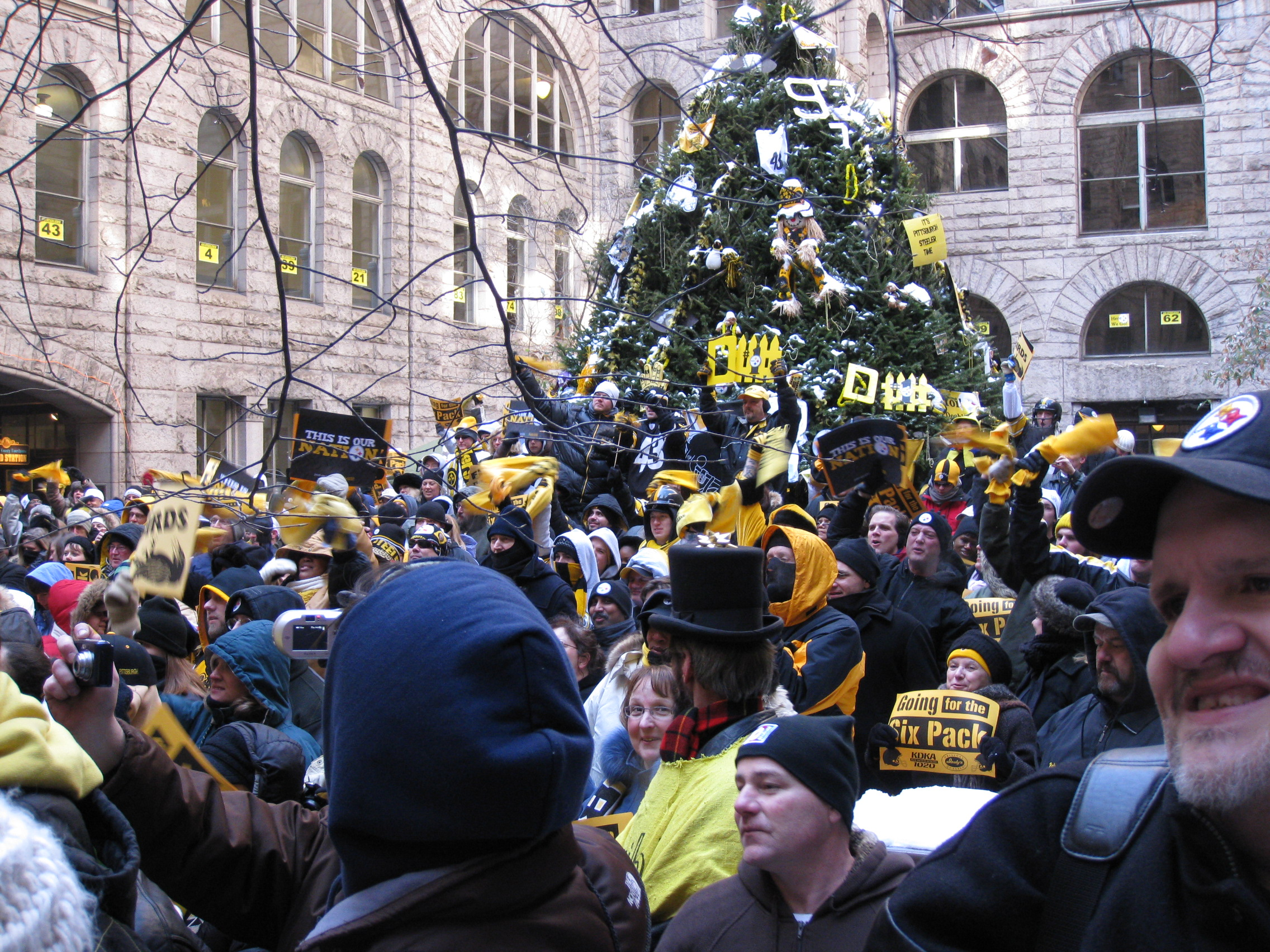
January 16, 2009 Steelers rally at Allegheny County Courthouse before the game

Pittsburgh hosted the Baltimore Ravens—who defeated the Miami Dolphins and Tennessee Titans in the Wild Card and Divisional rounds respectively—for the AFC Championship Game. During the week before the game, Pittsburgh mayor Luke Ravenstahl temporarily changed his name to Luke Steelerstahl in order to remove the "Raven". Though the change was not official the mayor did comment that "As soon as [he] heard [the idea], [he] thought it was a great idea."

Pittsburgh scored the game's first points, with Jeff Reed converting on field goals from 34 and 42 yards in the first quarter. Santonio Holmes received a pass from Ben Roethlisberger in the second quarter and ran for a 65-yard touchdown to give the Steelers a 13–0 lead. Baltimore's Willis McGahee ran into the endzone for a touchdown with 2:44 remaining in the second quarter—bringing the halftime score to 13–7. Reed converted his third field goal of the game from 46 yards in the third quarter. McGahee scored his second touchdown of the game with 9:32 remaining in the final quarter bringing the Ravens within two points. Troy Polamalu intercepted a pass from Joe Flacco and returned it 40 yards to score the final touchdown of the game, giving Pittsburgh a 23–14 victory.

==== Super Bowl: at Arizona Cardinals ====
Super Bowl XLIII: Pittsburgh Steelers vs. Arizona Cardinals – Game Summary

Quarter	1	2	3	4	Total
Steelers	3	14	3	7	27
Cardinals	0	7	0	16	23

at Raymond James Stadium, Tampa, Florida

- Date: February 1, 2009
- Game time: 6:30 p.m. EST
- Game weather: Mostly cloudy, 66 °F (19 °C)
- Game attendance: 70,774
- Referee: Terry McAulay
- TV announcers (NBC): Al Michaels, John Madden, Andrea Kremer, and Alex Flanagan
- NFL Game summary, NFL Films highlights

Game information

First quarter

- PIT – Jeff Reed 18-yard field goal, 9:45. Steelers 3–0. Drive: 9 plays, 72 yards, 5:15.

Second quarter

- PIT – Gary Russell 1-yard run (Jeff Reed kick), 14:01. Steelers 10–0. Drive: 11 plays, 69 yards, 1:12.
- ARI – Ben Patrick 1-yard pass from Kurt Warner (Neil Rackers kick), 8:34. Steelers 10–7. Drive: 9 plays, 83 yards, 5:27.
- PIT – James Harrison 100-yard interception return (Jeff Reed kick), 0:00. Steelers 17–7.

Third quarter

- PIT – Jeff Reed 21-yard field goal, 2:11. Steelers 20–7. Drive: 17 plays, 74 yards, 8:39.

Fourth quarter

- ARI – Larry Fitzgerald 1-yard pass from Kurt Warner (Neil Rackers kick), 7:33. Steelers 20–14. Drive: 8 plays, 85 yards, 3:57.
- ARI – Justin Hartwig holding penalty in end zone, 2:58. Steelers 20–16.
- ARI – Larry Fitzgerald 64-yard pass from Kurt Warner (Neil Rackers kick), 2:37. Cardinals 23–20. Drive: 2 plays, 64 yards, 0:21.
- PIT – Santonio Holmes 6-yard pass from Ben Roethlisberger (Jeff Reed kick), 0:35. Steelers 27–23. Drive: 8 plays, 78 yards, 2:02.

Top passers

- PIT – Ben Roethlisberger – 21/30, 256 yards, TD, INT
- ARI – Kurt Warner – 31/43, 377 yards, 3 TD, INT

Top rushers

- PIT – Willie Parker – 19 rushes, 53 yards
- ARI – Edgerrin James – 9 rushes, 33 yards

Top receivers

- PIT – Santonio Holmes – 9 receptions, 131 yards, TD
- ARI – Larry Fitzgerald – 7 receptions, 127 yards, 2 TD

Jeff Reed concluded the first drive of Super Bowl XLIII with a field goal—giving the Steelers a 3–0 lead over the Arizona Cardinals. Gary Russell scored on a 1-yard touchdown rush on the Steelers' second drive and the Cardinals responded by scoring a touchdown on the ensuing drive. On the final play of the first half James Harrison intercepted a pass from Kurt Warner and returned it 100 yards for a touchdown. As he did in the first quarter, Reed scored the sole points of the third quarter giving the Steelers a 20–7 lead entering the final quarter.

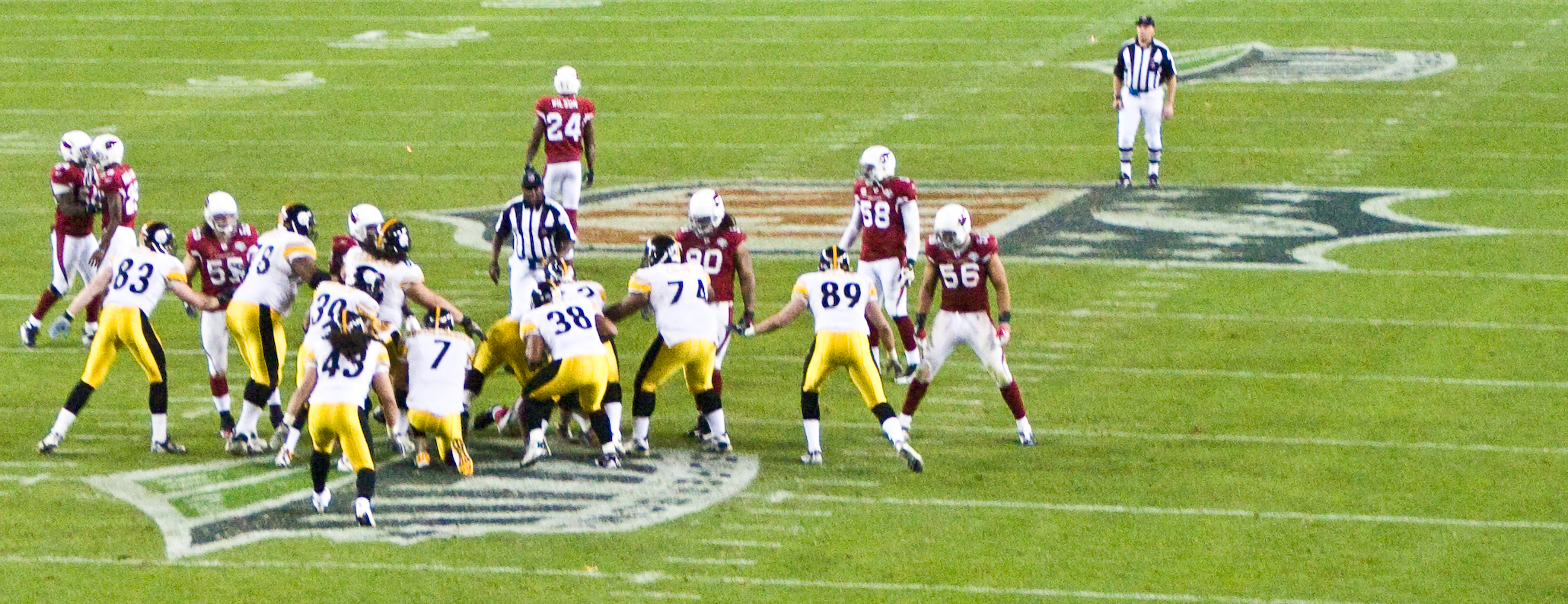
The final play of the season

The Cardinals scored three consecutive times in the fourth quarter—with two Larry Fitzgerald touchdown receptions and a Steelers' holding call in the endzone that resulted in a safety—to give them a 23–20 lead with 2:37 remaining in regulation. Pittsburgh drove 78 yards in 2:02 and scored on a touchdown pass from Ben Roethlisberger to Santonio Holmes. The Steelers four point lead held as time expired and the Pittsburgh Steelers became the first team to win six Super Bowl titles.

Santonio Holmes was voted the game's Most Valuable Player. Mike Tomlin became the youngest coach to win a Super Bowl. Harrison's interception return was the longest play in Super Bowl history. On February 3 a parade was held in Pittsburgh to celebrate the victory, according to the Pittsburgh Post-Gazette an estimated 400,000 people attended. The city's name was ceremonially changed to "the City of Sixburgh" for the duration of 2009.
