= Willie Parker =

American football player (born 1980)

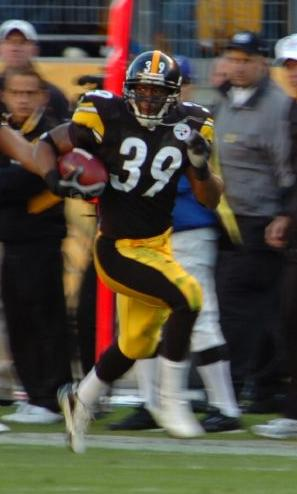
- Parker with the Pittsburgh Steelers in 2006

No. 39
- Position: Running back

Personal information
- Born: November 11, 1980 (age 46); Clinton, North Carolina, U.S.
- Listed height: 5 ft 10 in (1.78 m)
- Listed weight: 212 lb (96 kg)

Career information
- High school: Clinton
- College: North Carolina (1999–2003)
- NFL draft: 2004: undrafted

Career history
- Pittsburgh Steelers (2004–2009); Washington Redskins (2010)*
- * Offseason or practice squad member only

Awards and highlights
- 2× Super Bowl champion (XL, XLIII); 2× Pro Bowl (2006, 2007); Pittsburgh Steelers Hall of Honor; NFL record: Longest run in Super Bowl history (75 yards)

Career NFL statistics
- Rushing attempts: 1,253
- Rushing yards: 5,378
- Rushing touchdowns: 24
- Receptions: 84
- Receiving yards: 697
- Receiving touchdowns: 5
- Stats at Pro Football Reference

Willie Everett Parker Jr. (born November 11, 1980) is an American former professional football player who was a running back for six seasons for the Pittsburgh Steelers of the National Football League (NFL). After playing college football for the North Carolina Tar Heels, he was signed by the Steelers as an undrafted free agent in 2004.

== Early life ==
Willie Parker was born in Clinton, North Carolina, attended Clinton High School, and was a letterman in football and track. He was a two-time All-Conference and a two-time All-Region honoree. As a junior, he rushed for 1,329 yards and 20 touchdowns and helped lead his team to the state AA title. As a senior, he rushed for 1,801 yards and 18 touchdowns (while averaging 12.3 yards per carry) and was also named the County Player of the Year. One of Parker's cousins is Leonard Henry, former Miami Dolphins running back. In track & field, Parker competed as a sprinter and was a state qualifier in the 100-meter dash (11.1 s) and 4 × 100 m (44.64 s).

== College career ==
He attended the University of North Carolina. In his first year, he had some success with 355 yards on 84 carries, but was only used sparingly in his last three years due to decisions made by former head coach John Bunting to restrict Parker's playing time until he "bulked up" to fit within Bunting's attempt at establishing a power running game. In addition, Parker's father has stated that he thought the murder of Parker's best friend from home during Parker's sophomore year made it difficult for him to adapt to the new system at North Carolina.

Parker started the first three games of his sophomore season and played in nine games. He was able to finish the season second on the team in rushing with 400 yards but only having 83 carries and had three touchdowns. Willies best game was the Peach Bowl against Auburn where he racked up 131 rushing yards on 19 carries and scored one touchdown. His touchdown run in the first quarter gave Carolina a 7–0 lead. Willie also caught three passes for 24 yards. Parker began the year as UNC's starting tailback, but was replaced in the starting lineup against Florida State. He did not play against Florida State, NC State or Georgia Tech, but was a crucial part of the offense towards the end of the season. Had a 102-yard showing at Maryland in the second game of the season. Scored on UNC's first play from scrimmage against the Terps on a 77-yard run. Parker had 66 yards on 10 carries and one touchdown vs. Duke, and as outstanding against SMU, with 82 yards on 13 carries (6.3 yards per attempt) and a 2-yard touchdown run. In the last two regular-season games against Duke and SMU, he totaled 148 yards on 23 carries and two touchdowns.

Parker played in 11 games and started only two his junior year. Parker was able to start the season-opener against Miami (Ohio) and at Virginia. He was able to finish the season second on the team with 70 carries for 236 yards and one touchdown. Willie was also able to haul in 12 passes for 104 yards. His most productive day of the season was in Carolina's win at Syracuse with 79 yards rushing on 13 carries, averaging 6.1 yards per attempt. He had a 50-yard touchdown run to end the first quarter as the Tar Heels took a 10–0 lead vs. SU. Willie led the Tar Heels with 43 yards rushing on 13 attempts against NC State, and had one reception for five yards. Willie had a season-high 15 carries for only 36 yards and five receptions for 43 yards at Virginia. Willie's usage began to slip away against Florida State when he only mounted six rushes for 26 yards. Again against Maryland, his usage began to diminish when he only toted the ball four times for five yards. Willie gained 12 yards on four carries in the loss to Wake Forest. He also gained 12 yards on five carries against Arizona State. In a loss to the Longhorns, Willie was only able to gain 15 yards on two carriers.

Head Coach John Bunting, Offensive Coordinator Gary Tranquill, and Running Backs Coach Andre Powell capped Parker’s career when they did not insert a healthy, active Parker for a single play in the Senior Day finale against Duke.

== Professional career ==
=== Pittsburgh Steelers ===
Parker was an undrafted free agent with the Steelers in 2004. While at UNC, Parker displayed great speed, but little vision, resulting in inconsistent play which led to him being benched in favor of Ronnie McGill during his senior year. Parker's experience as a backup in college drew comparison to Hall of Famer Franco Harris, the Steelers all-time leading rusher and Super Bowl IX MVP, who served as a backup to Lydell Mitchell when he played at Penn State, as supposedly, head coach Joe Paterno preferred Mitchell's style over Harris'.

He spent the 2004 NFL season as a backup player behind Jerome Bettis, Duce Staley and Verron Haynes. During the 2004 season, he had his most impressive game in week 17 at Buffalo. Duce Staley started the game and played most of the first quarter, while Parker took over for the rest of the game. He ran for 102 yards in the remaining 3 quarters, including a very long sprint of 58 yards that was part of a game-controlling drive. The Steelers, playing mostly reserves (third-stringer Brian St. Pierre played part of the game at QB) had already sealed the top seed in the AFC that year, but for the Bills, a win could have meant the playoffs. After Parker's performance in this game, head coach Bill Cowher gave Parker extensive playing time during the 2005 preseason.

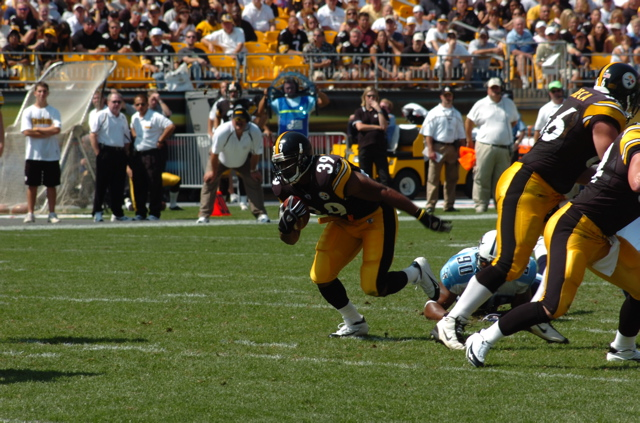
Parker against the Titans in 2005

In his second year, Parker earned the starting job after both Bettis (hamstring) and Staley (knees) missed the first part of the season with injuries. By default, Parker had to play the first game against the Tennessee Titans. He impressed Bill Cowher, as well as Titans coach Jeff Fisher, by gaining 161 rushing yards on 22 attempts (7.3 average). After following this performance with another 100+ yard game against the Houston Texans, Cowher gave Parker the starting position. "Fast Willie" started 15 of 16 games that season (being injured week 9 against the Green Bay Packers and missed the week 10 contest against the Cleveland Browns), finishing with 255 carries for 1,202 yards (4.7 average, a career long 80-yard touchdown run in week 16 against the Browns) and 4 touchdowns. He also finished the season with 218 yards receiving and one touchdown. Parker was the first Steeler back since Bettis in 2001 to top 1,000 yards in a season. Also, he is the second undrafted running back to rush for over 1,200 in the history of the NFL.(Along with Priest Holmes)

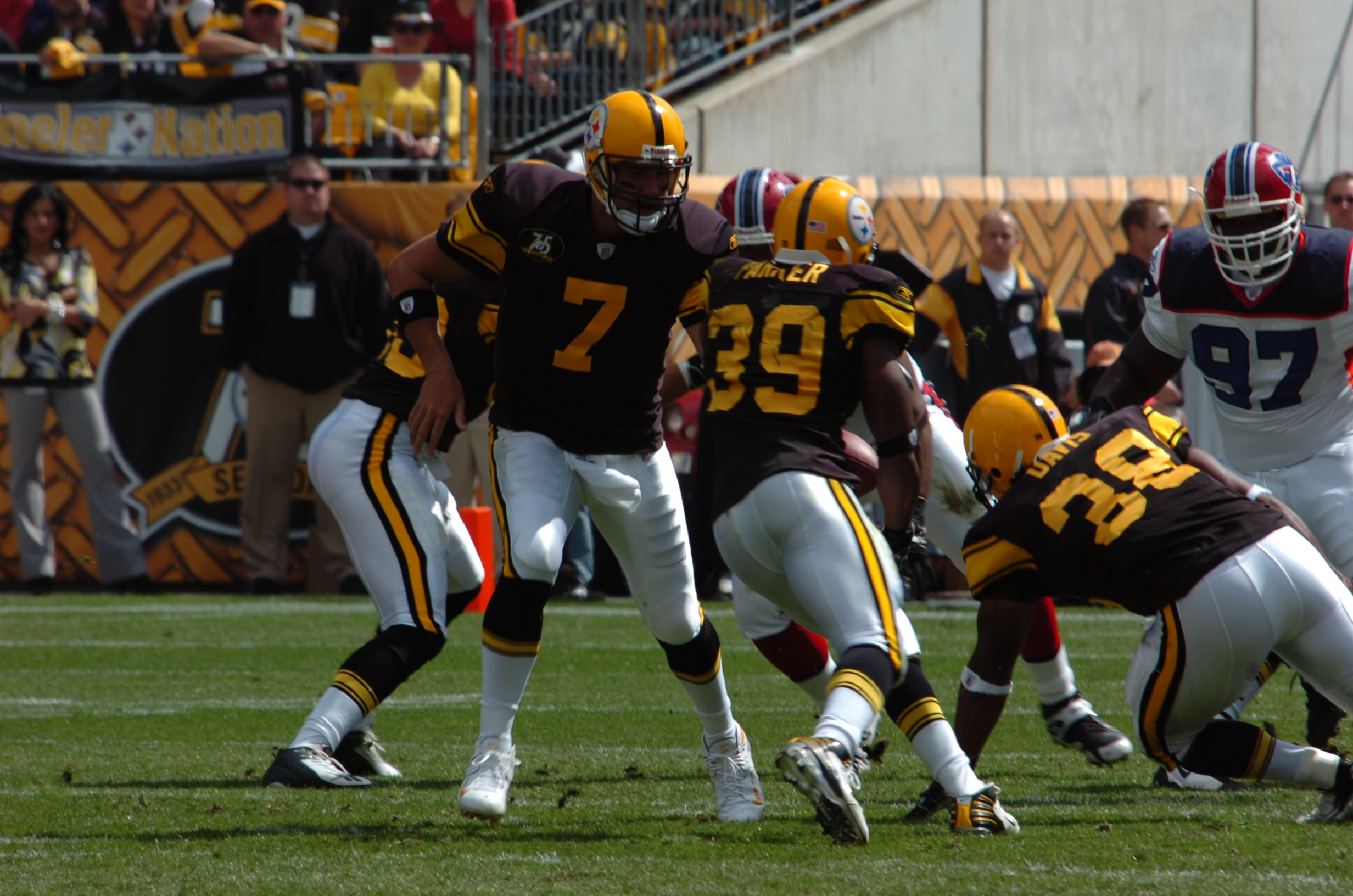
Parker receiving a handoff

In the third quarter of Super Bowl XL, Parker scored a 75-yard touchdown, the longest rushing play in Super Bowl history, to give the Steelers a 14–3 lead over the Seattle Seahawks. The previous longest was 74 yards by Marcus Allen in Super Bowl XVIII against the Washington Redskins.

Parker finished the game with 93 yards on 10 carries and an average of 9.3 yards a carry, the third-best average in Super Bowl history (minimum 10 carries). Parker gave his Super Bowl ring to his father Willie Parker Sr. as a gift.

In 2006, Parker signed a major contract with the Steelers, a four-year $13.6 million deal that would solidify his future role on the team. Bill Cowher was quoted as saying that Parker would be a workhorse and receive the goal-line carries in his role as the starter, guaranteeing him the starring running-back role in Pittsburgh.

On November 12, 2006, in a home game against the New Orleans Saints, Parker rushed for 213 yards on 22 carries and two touchdowns, coming 5 yards short of the highest single-game rushing total in Steelers history. His two long gains of 72 and 76 yards set up touchdowns that capped off the Pittsburgh victory, 38–31. His 76-yard sprint late in the 4th quarter was the longest rush in Heinz Field history.

On December 7, against the Cleveland Browns, Parker broke the all-time Steelers rushing record for a single game, gaining 223 yards on 32 carries & 1 touchdown before being taken out of the game in the third quarter. The record was previously held by John "Frenchy" Fuqua. Parker also became the only Steelers running back to have two 200+ yard games in the same year.

Parker played in (and started) all 16 regular season games. He compiled 1,494 yards on 337 carries (4.4 average) with 13 rushing touchdowns. He also had 12 runs of 20+ yards. Parker also caught 31 passes for 222 yards (7.2 average) and 3 touchdowns. In addition, his 16 combined scores broke the previous Steelers single-season touchdown mark of 15 set by Louis Lipps in 1987. Parker served as a backup to LaDainian Tomlinson and Larry Johnson in his first Pro Bowl, where he would finish the game with 40 yards on 2 carries.

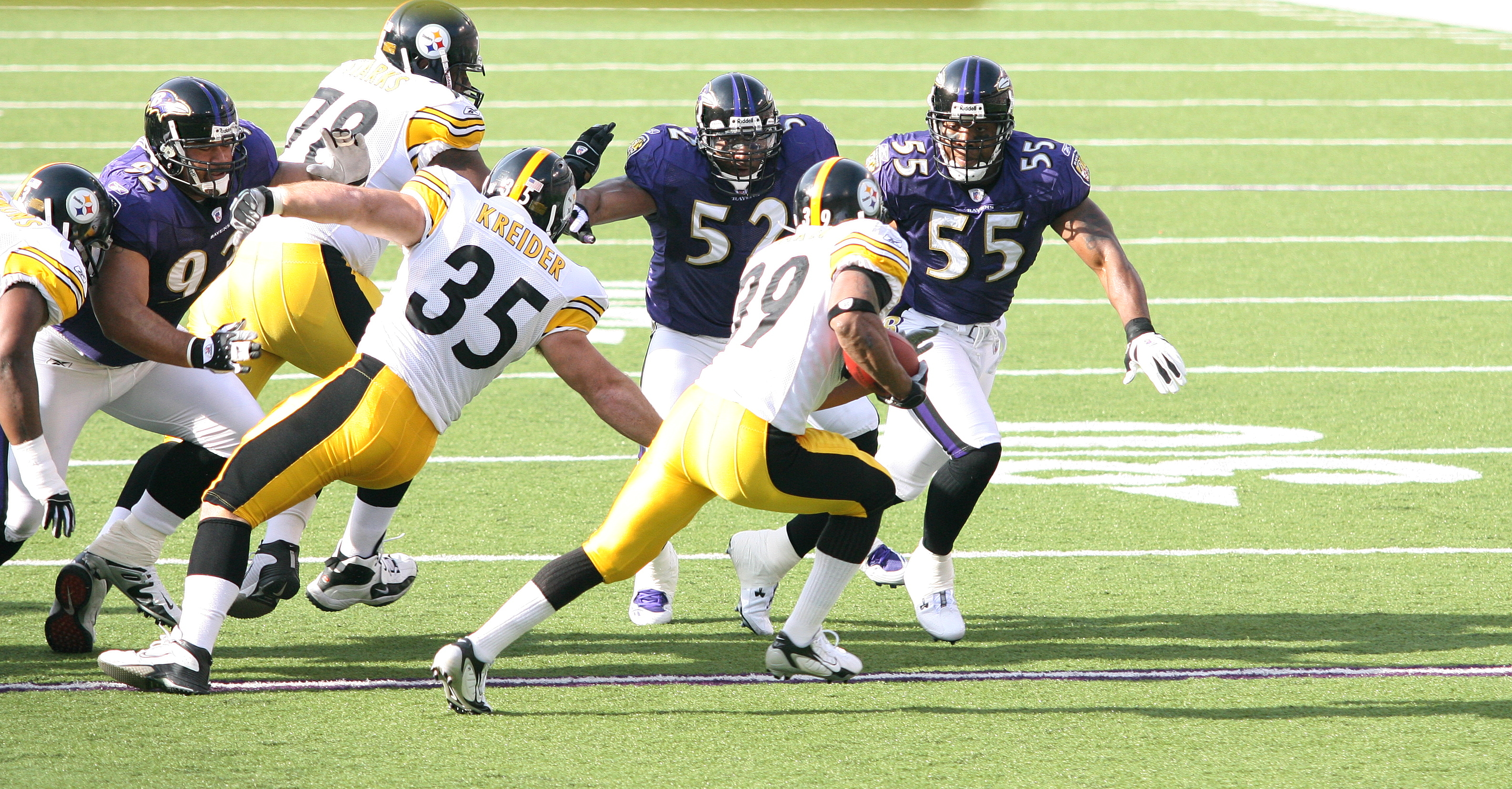
Parker running against the Ravens, 2006.

Parker was productive in 2007 as well, rushing for 1,316 yards but only 2 total touchdowns. He had eight 100-yard plus games, leading the league in that category and earning a second consecutive Pro Bowl berth before being injured late in the season. Parker suffered a broken right fibula early in a game against the St. Louis Rams on December 20, 2007, ending his season. He was replaced by backup Najeh Davenport. Parker led the league in rushing yardage at the time of his injury.

Coming off of his broken leg near the end of the 2007 campaign, there were questions surrounding Willie Parker's ability to recover. He played little in the preseason, giving way to Rashard Mendenhall for much of the time. The first game of the year was against the Houston Texans. In this game, Parker would record 138 rushing yards and a career-high 3 touchdowns, all before the fourth quarter ever started. The Steelers got up 35–3 in the third quarter, and opted to pull some of their starting players. He was the leading AFC rusher for the week and was named the AFC Offensive Player of the Week. However, Parker suffered a knee injury four games into the season, leading to five missed games. His back-up, Rashard Mendenhall, suffered a shoulder injury and was placed on injured reserve. The third-string running back, Mewelde Moore, produced well in Parker's absence, with 908 yards from scrimmage. Parker had four 100-yard performances, while compiling 791 yards on 210 carries, for a 3.8 average (worst of his career), and five touchdowns. He added only three receptions for 13 yards for an average of 4.3 yards per catch. Against the Chargers, Parker had his first 100+ yard game of his playoff career, compiling 146 yards on 27 carries and two touchdowns. The Steelers reached the Super Bowl again in 2008 and played Arizona Cardinals at Super Bowl XLIII. In Super Bowl XLIII, Parker was not able to make a significant impact, as the Pittsburgh Steelers were unable to establish a strong rushing game. He had 19 carries for only 53 yards, bringing his average to a mere 2.8 yards per carry, and no touchdowns. Regardless, with Ben Roethlisberger at the helm establishing the passing game, the Steelers went on to collect their sixth championship ring in Super Bowl XLIII, becoming the first team in NFL history to obtain that amount.

Parker began his final contract year with the Steelers as the starter for the first three games of the season, carrying for 19, 47, and 93 yards. He was injured with turf toe and missed two games after the injury. Rashard Mendenhall then started those three games and played well, leading to Mendenhall becoming the starter. Parker ran for 26 yards on seven carries against the Cleveland Browns when he returned to play.

Not counting the preseason, Pittsburgh was the only team Parker ever touched the field for in his entire professional career.

=== Washington Redskins ===
On April 2, 2010, Parker signed with the Washington Redskins, adding a third running back to Washington's committee of Clinton Portis and Larry Johnson. He was released during final cuts on September 4, 2010.

=== Virginia Destroyers ===
On April 26, 2011, the Virginia Destroyers of the United Football League claimed Parker off waivers. He announced that he would be signing with the team on August 2, 2011. However, Parker ultimately never played with the team.

=== Retirement ===
On August 3, 2012, Parker officially retired.

== Career statistics ==
=== NFL ===
Regular season stats

Year	Team	Games played	Att	att/g	yds	avg	yds/g	TD
2004	Pittsburgh Steelers	8	32	4	186	5.8	23.2	0
2005	Pittsburgh Steelers	15	255	17	1,202	4.7	80.1	4
2006	Pittsburgh Steelers	16	337	21.1	1,494	4.4	93.4	13
2007	Pittsburgh Steelers	15	321	21.4	1,316	4.1	87.7	2
2008	Pittsburgh Steelers	11	210	19.1	791	3.8	71.9	5
2009	Pittsburgh Steelers	14	98	7.0	389	4	27.8	0
Career		79	1,253	15.9	5,378	4.3	68.1	24

Postseason stats

Year	Team	Games played	Att	att/g	yds	avg	yds/g	TD
2005	Pittsburgh Steelers	4	70	17	225	3.2	56.3	1
2008	Pittsburgh Steelers	3	57	19.1	246	4.3	82	2
Career		7	127	18.1	471	3.7	67.3	3

=== College ===
Year	Team	Games played	Att	att/g	yds	avg	yds/g	TD
2000	North Carolina	9	84	9.3	355	4.2	39.4	4
2001	North Carolina	9	83	9.2	400	4.8	44.4	3
2002	North Carolina	11	70	6.3	236	3.4	21.4	1
2003	North Carolina	9	48	5.3	181	3.8	20.1	0
Career		38	285	7.5	1,172	4.1	30.8	8

== Coaching career ==
Parker became an assistant coach for the West Virginia Wesleyan College football team in July 2012.

Beginning in 2015, Parker became running backs coach at Heritage High School in Wake Forest, North Carolina. Former NFL player Dewayne Washington is the head coach and Torry Holt serves as assistant head coach and wide receivers coach.

== Personal life ==
As of 2026, Parker's cousin Jaylen Warren plays running back for the Steelers.
