= Bruce Davis (linebacker) =

American football player (born 1985)

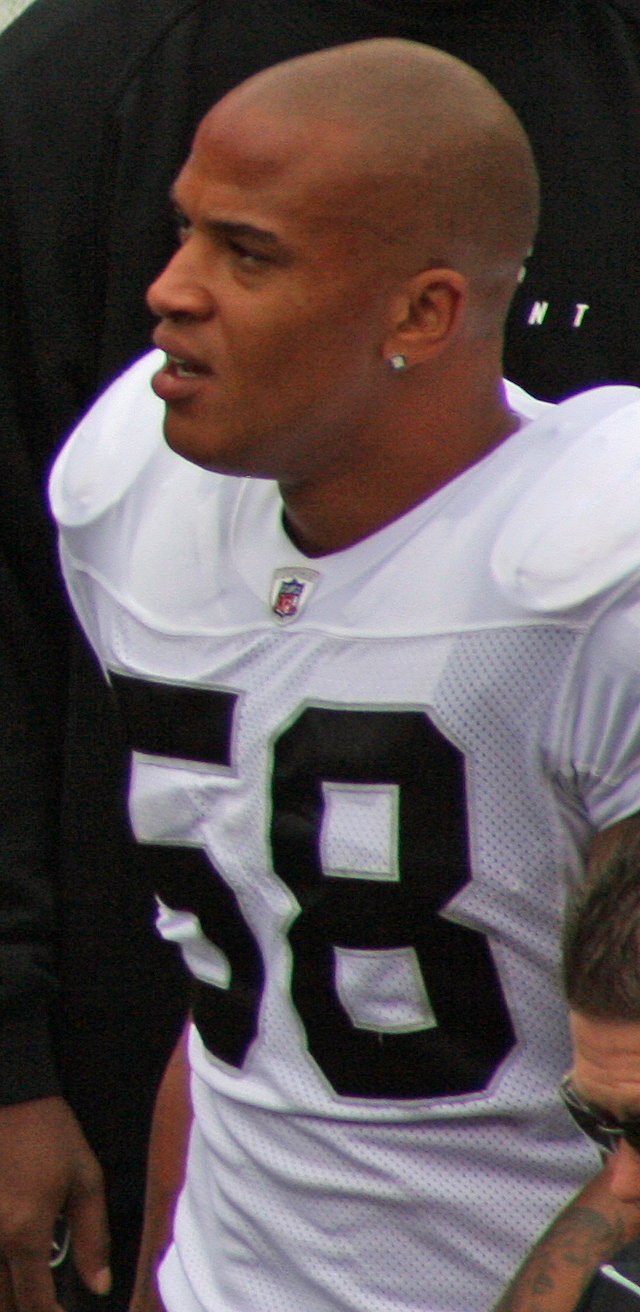
- Davis with the Oakland Raiders in 2010

No. 53, 58, 97
- Position: Linebacker

Personal information
- Born: September 2, 1985 (age 41); Los Angeles, California, U.S.
- Listed height: 6 ft 3 in (1.91 m)
- Listed weight: 250 lb (113 kg)

Career information
- High school: Clear Creek (League City, Texas)
- College: UCLA
- NFL draft: 2008: 3rd round, 88th overall pick

Career history
- Pittsburgh Steelers (2008); New England Patriots (2009–2010)*; Denver Broncos (2010)*; San Francisco 49ers (2010)*; Oakland Raiders (2010–2011); Cincinnati Bengals (2011)*; San Francisco 49ers (2012)*; Hamilton Tiger-Cats (2012)
- * Offseason or practice squad member only

Awards and highlights
- Super Bowl champion (XLIII); First-team All-American (2006); Second-team All-American (2007); 2× Second-team All-Pac-10 (2006, 2007)

Career NFL statistics
- Total tackles: 5
- Forced fumbles: 2
- Stats at Pro Football Reference

Bruce Edward Davis II (born September 2, 1985) is an American former professional football player who was a linebacker in the National Football League (NFL). He played college football for the UCLA Bruins, earning All-American honors. Davis was selected by the Pittsburgh Steelers in the third round of the 2008 NFL draft. In his rookie season, he helped the Steelers win Super Bowl XLIII.

Davis also played for the Oakland Raiders, and is the son of former NFL offensive tackle Bruce Davis.

== Early life ==
Davis attended Clear Creek High School in League City, Texas. As a junior, he made 32 tackles, including eight sacks. He earned All-Greater Houston area and All-League honors after he recorded 65 tackles (50 solo), 12 quarterback sacks and 17 tackles for loss as a senior.

.

== College career ==
At the University of California, Los Angeles, Davis played defensive end. He redshirted his freshman year with the Bruins in 2003. In 2004, he played in all 12 games, starting the first two contests, at defensive end. He had 17 tackles and 2.5 sacks. In 2005 Davis moved to outside linebacker from defensive end during the spring and played both positions early in the season before moving back to end due to injuries on the team. He appeared in all 12 games and his 28 tackles for the season and was tied for third on the team with two sacks and was sixth with six tackles for losses. As a junior in 2006, he was named first-team All-American by CollegeFootballNews.com and SI.com and he was selected second-team All-Pacific-10 Conference. On the year, Davis made 47 tackles, with 12.5 sacks and 17.5 tackles for loss. In 2007, he was a second-team All-American choice by The NFL Draft Report and the Walter Camp Foundation and was again second-team All-Pac-10. He was a semifinalist for the Bednarik Award and was on the watch lists for the Lott, Nagurski, Lombardi and Hendricks Awards. He started all 13 games at right defensive end, ranking tied for ninth in the nation and tied for first in the league with 12 sacks. He ranked sixth in the Pac-10 with 15.5 stops for losses. On the year he recorded 45 tackles (32 solos) caused two fumbles and recovered another and deflected nine passes and defensed 3 others.

Davis ranks second in school history with 29 quarterback sacks, topped only by Dave Ball's 30.5 (2000–03). His 42.5 stops for losses rank third in school annals behind Ball (43.5) and Carnell Lake (45.5, 1985–88).

== Professional career ==
=== Pre-draft ===
Pre-draft measurables
Height	Weight	40-yard dash	10-yard split	20-yard split	20-yard shuttle	Three-cone drill	Vertical jump	Broad jump	Bench press
6 ft 2 5/8 in (1.90 m)	252 lb (114 kg)	4.78 s	1.60 s	2.75 s	4.47 s	7.34 s	32 in (0.81 m)	9 ft 11 in (3.02 m)	19 reps
All values from NFL Scouting Combine except broad and vertical jump (UCLA Pro Day)

=== Pittsburgh Steelers ===
Davis was selected by the Pittsburgh Steelers in the third round (88th overall) of the 2008 NFL draft. After being drafted by the Steelers, he was converted to outside linebacker in the Steelers' 3-4 defense, though faced difficulty in the transition, as he was inactive for most of his rookie season. He was waived on September 4, 2009.

=== New England Patriots ===
Davis was signed to the New England Patriots practice squad on October 7, 2009. After spending the remainder of the season on the practice squad, he was re-signed to a future contract on January 13, 2010. The Patriots waived Davis on May 27, 2010.

=== Denver Broncos ===
Davis was claimed off waivers by the Denver Broncos on June 1, 2010. He was waived on July 27.

=== San Francisco 49ers (first stint) ===
Davis was signed by the San Francisco 49ers on August 10, 2010. On September 3, 2010, Davis was cut from the 53-player roster that would go on to play regular season games. The 49ers then re-signed him to their practice squad on September 5, 2010; he was released from his contract nine days later. He was re-signed to the practice squad on September 22.

=== Oakland Raiders ===
On October 5, 2010, the Oakland Raiders signed Davis to their active roster to help bolster the team's injury-depleted linebacker corps. He was waived a year later on October 13, 2011.

=== Cincinnati Bengals ===
On November 23, 2011, the Cincinnati Bengals signed Davis to their practice squad.

=== San Francisco 49ers (second stint) ===
On January 3, 2012, the 49ers signed Davis to their practice squad.

=== Hamilton Tiger-Cats ===
On August 4, 2012, Davis was signed by the Hamilton Tiger-Cats and assigned to their practice squad. On August 16, he was promoted to the active roster and started his first career game vs. Winnipeg.
