= Limas Sweed =

American gridiron football player (born 1984)

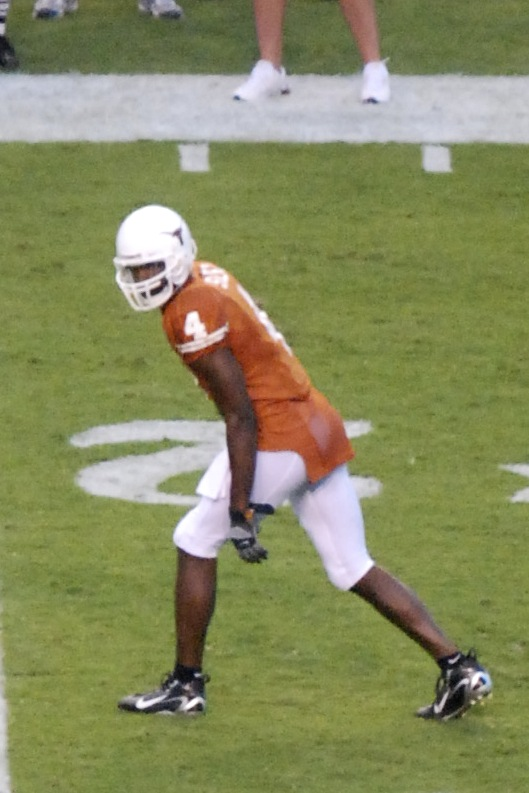
- Sweed with the Texas Longhorns in 2006

No. 14, 80
- Position: Wide receiver

Personal information
- Born: December 25, 1984 (age 41); Brenham, Texas, U.S.
- Listed height: 6 ft 4 in (1.93 m)
- Listed weight: 220 lb (100 kg)

Career information
- High school: Brenham
- College: Texas (2004–2007)
- NFL draft: 2008: 2nd round, 53rd overall pick

Career history
- Pittsburgh Steelers (2008–2011); Saskatchewan Roughriders (2012–2013)*; Ottawa Redblacks (2014)*
- * Offseason or practice squad member only

Awards and highlights
- Super Bowl champion (XLIII); BCS national champion (2005); First-team All-Big 12 (2006); 2× Rose Bowl champion (2004, 2005)

Career NFL statistics
- Receptions: 7
- Receiving yards: 69
- Stats at Pro Football Reference

Limas Lee Sweed Jr. (born December 25, 1984) is an American former professional football player who was a wide receiver in the National Football League (NFL). He was selected by the Pittsburgh Steelers in the second round of the 2008 NFL draft. He was part of their Super Bowl XLIII championship team. He played college football for the Texas Longhorns. He was also a member of the Saskatchewan Roughriders and Ottawa Redblacks of the Canadian Football League (CFL).

== Early life ==
Sweed attended Brenham High School in Brenham, Texas. He was a starting receiver on the Brenham Cubs and took them to the Texas AAAA State Championship, where they were defeated by Denton Ryan High School.

He lettered in basketball and track. In track, he finished 4th at the UIL State Meet in the 110 Hurdles his senior year.

== College career ==
Sweed was a redshirt freshman in the 2004 season. As a sophomore, Sweed recorded 36 receptions for 545 yards and 5 touchdowns. One of these touchdowns was a game winning catch from Vince Young against Ohio State to keep the Longhorns ranked second in the nation. In addition, Sweed recorded eight receptions for 65 yards in the BCS National Championship against USC.

Sweed's junior year would be his best season statistically. Receiving for new quarterback Colt McCoy, Sweed collected 46 receptions for 801 yards and 12 touchdowns. By catching a touchdown pass in seven straight games, Sweed broke former Longhorn Roy Williams' record for consecutive games with a touchdown reception.

In the summer prior to the 2007 NCAA Division I FBS football season, Sweed injured his wrist but was cleared to play in the season opener for the 2007 Texas Longhorns football team. In the sixth game of the season, the 2007 Red River Shootout, he left the game early because he re-injured his left wrist. He underwent surgery to tighten the ligaments in the wrist, ending his season. He returned to play in the Senior Bowl, and was fully healthy for the NFL Scouting Combine.

== Professional career ==
Pre-draft measurables
Height	Weight	Arm length	Hand span	40-yard dash	10-yard split	20-yard split	20-yard shuttle	Three-cone drill	Vertical jump	Broad jump
6 ft 3 7/8 in (1.93 m)	215 lb (98 kg)	32 1/2 in (0.83 m)	9 1/2 in (0.24 m)	4.50 s	1.53 s	2.62 s	4.33 s	7.14 s	37.5 in (0.95 m)	10 ft 8 in (3.25 m)
All values from NFL Combine/Pro Day

=== Pittsburgh Steelers ===
Originally projected to be the first or second receiver taken in the draft, Sweed's stock fell sharply due to his injury. He was selected 53rd overall by the Pittsburgh Steelers, and was the ninth receiver selected. On July 27, 2008, Sweed agreed to a four-year contract with the Steelers worth $3.3 million.

During training camp, Sweed discovered that he had astigmatism in both eyes and would have to wear contacts. In the 2008 preseason opener against the Philadelphia Eagles, Sweed led the Steelers with 3 receptions for 23 yards. His regular season debut came in week 7 against the Cincinnati Bengals, due to an injury suffered by Dallas Baker. He caught one pass for 11 yards. He would go on to win a Super Bowl with the Steelers that season.

Going into training camp in 2009, Sweed faced competition for the 3rd wide receiver position between veteran Shaun McDonald and rookie Mike Wallace. Sweed entered the season as the 6th receiver, rarely playing in the first 3 games. He dropped a pass in Week 3 which would have been a touchdown. Following this drop, Sweed bounced between the 4th and 5th receiver spots until Shaun McDonald was released on November 28, solidifying Sweed as the 4th receiver.

On December 21, 2009, Sweed was placed on the Reserve/Non-Football Injury/Illness List. The nature of the injury was not announced, although he stated that he was dealing with "personal issues."

On May 2, 2010, Sweed injured his left Achilles tendon during the final day of a three-day minicamp. On May 3, 2010, Sweed underwent surgery to repair his torn Achilles tendon, and he was placed on season-ending injured reserve a few days later.

On August 17, 2011, the Steelers placed Sweed on the Waived/Injured list. He was then released by the Steelers in mid-September.

=== Saskatchewan Roughriders ===
On October 25, 2012, the Saskatchewan Roughriders signed Sweed. He was released by the team on June 4, 2013.

=== Ottawa Redblacks ===
On February 10, 2014, Sweed signed with the Ottawa Redblacks. He was released by the team on April 16, 2014.
