= 2007 Cleveland Browns season =

59th season in franchise history; last winning season for 13 years

- Owner: Randy Lerner
- General manager: Phil Savage
- Head coach: Romeo Crennel
- Home stadium: Cleveland Browns Stadium

Results
- Record: 10–6
- Division place: 2nd AFC North
- Playoffs: Did not qualify
- Pro Bowlers: OT Joe Thomas; TE Kellen Winslow II; QB Derek Anderson; WR Braylon Edwards; KR Joshua Cribbs; LS Ryan Pontbriand

Uniform

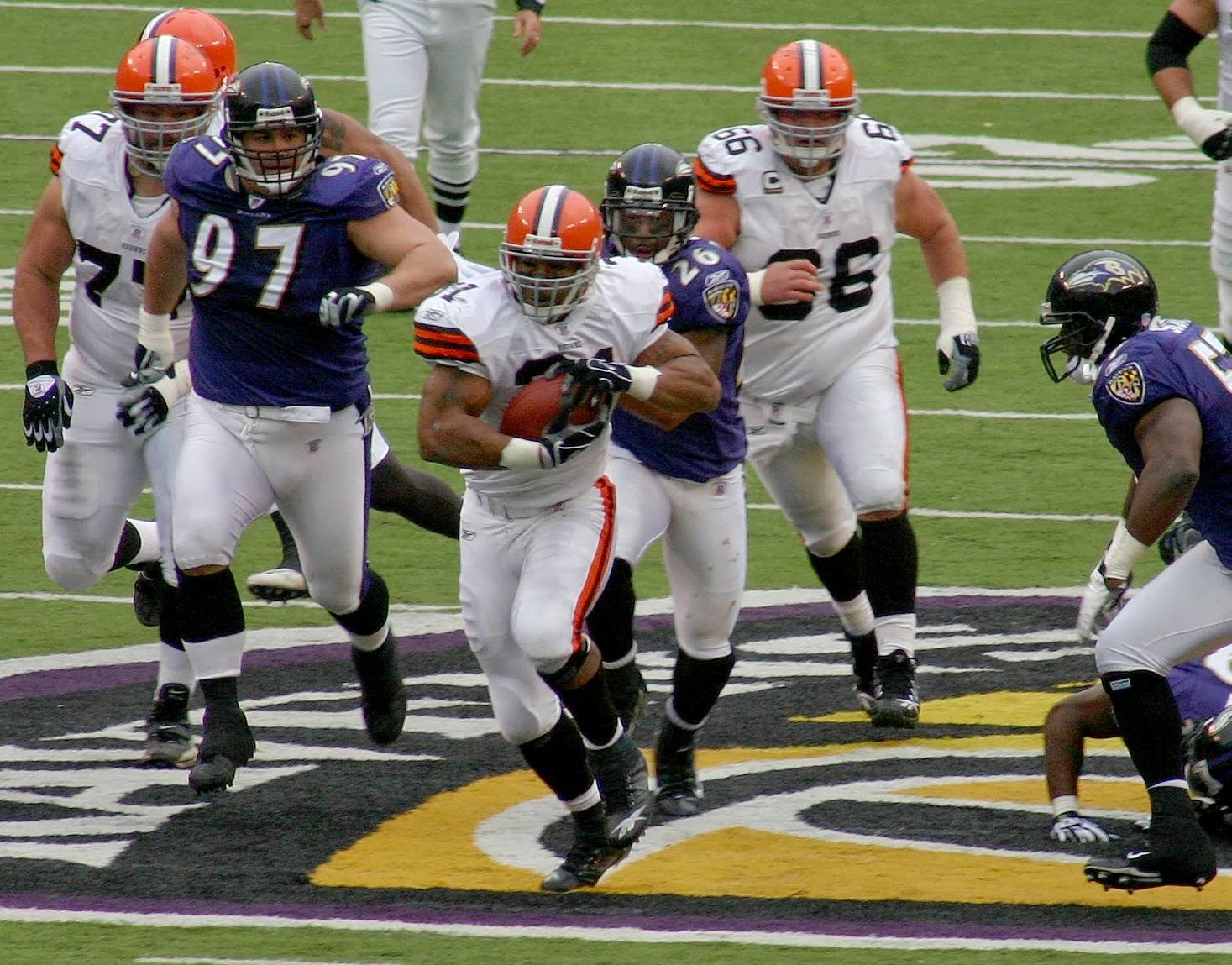
Jamal Lewis rushes during Cleveland's 33-30 OT win at Baltimore, week 11

The 2007 Cleveland Browns season was the franchise's 59th season as a professional sports franchise and its 55th season as a member of the National Football League (NFL). The season began with the Browns attempting to improve upon their 4–12 record from the 2006 season, in which the team finished in fourth place in the AFC North. The Browns also attempted to overcome the many injuries that plagued the team throughout the 2006 season. The Browns remained under the supervision of head coach Romeo Crennel and they played all of their home games in Cleveland Browns Stadium in Cleveland, Ohio.

During the 2007 NFL draft, the Browns selected Wisconsin offensive tackle Joe Thomas with the third overall selection. The Browns were also able to draft Notre Dame quarterback Brady Quinn with the 22nd overall selection, after completing a trade with the Dallas Cowboys, which saw the Browns send their second-round pick in the 2007 draft, along with their first round pick in the 2008 NFL draft, to the Cowboys for their first round selection at number 22. The Browns completed their first day draft by selecting UNLV cornerback Eric Wright, following another trade with Dallas, which saw the Browns giving up their third- and fourth-round picks in the 2007 draft and swapping sixth-round picks with the Cowboys.

During the offseason, the Browns signed key free agents Eric Steinbach (Cincinnati, guard), Jamal Lewis (Baltimore, running back), and Robaire Smith (Tennessee, defensive end).

The Browns ultimately finished the season with a 10–6 record but nevertheless failed to qualify for the playoffs. They were beaten for the division title on a tiebreaker by the Pittsburgh Steelers and lost another tiebreaker for a wildcard berth to the Tennessee Titans. The team finished the season having scored 402 points with 5,621 yards of total offense, both 8th best in the NFL; however, the defense allowed 382 points (12th worst) and gave up 5,753 yards (3rd worst).

As of today, this remains the third-best record and the second of four winning seasons the Browns have had since returning to the NFL in 1999. This was the Browns’ last winning season until 2020. This was the last season until 2025 that a Cleveland Brown quarterback made the Pro Bowl, when they drafted Shedeur Sanders.

== Offseason ==
=== Coaching staff changes ===
The Cleveland Browns’ offense was marred by bad play calling throughout the early stages of the 2006 season, forcing the resignation of the team's offensive coordinator, Maurice Carthon, on October 24, 2006. Following Carthon's resignation, head coach Romeo Crennel hired assistant head coach and offensive line coach Jeff Davidson as the team's offensive coordinator for the remainder of the 2006 season. However, the Browns lost Davidson to the Carolina Panthers, where he was hired to serve as the Panthers’ offensive coordinator. Because of Davidson's hiring in Carolina, the Browns hired Rob Chudzinski as the team's new offensive coordinator. The team has also hired Ted Daisher as the team's new special teams coordinator.

Other coaching staff changes made by the Browns in the 2007 off-season include the hiring of Steve Marshall as the offensive line coach; Tom Myslinski as the strength-and-conditioning coach; Alan DeGennaro as the assistant strength-and-conditioning coach; Dave Atkins as the senior offensive assistant coach; Anthony Lynn as the running backs coach; Rip Scherer as the assistant head coach and quarterbacks coach; and Alfredo Roberts as the tight ends coach.

On June 14, defensive coordinator Todd Grantham's contract was extended by two years, allowing him to remain with the Browns through the 2009 season.

=== Roster changes ===
The Cleveland Browns had one of the busiest offseasons in terms of movement in the NFL. Beginning on March 3, 2007, the Browns signed former Cincinnati Bengals guard Eric Steinbach to a seven-year contract and former Houston Texans outside linebacker Antwan Peek to a three-year contract; the team also resigned center Hank Fraley to a four-year contract, fearing that center LeCharles Bentley's 2006 season-ending knee injury may also be a career-ending injury.

The following day, March 4, the Browns signed former Washington Redskins cornerback Kenny Wright to a three-year contract. One day later, on March 5, the Browns lost wide receiver and punt returner Dennis Northcutt to the Jacksonville Jaguars under the terms of a five-year contract.

On March 8, the team signed former Baltimore Ravens running back Jamal Lewis to a one-year contract, bolstering the team's lackluster running game. Because of Lewis’ signing, running back Reuben Droughns had been made expendable, and was subsequently traded to the New York Giants for wide receiver Tim Carter on March 9.

Also on March 9, the Browns terminated the contract of veteran cornerback Daylon McCutcheon, citing that he failed a physical, and lost safety Brian Russell to the Seattle Seahawks, though the terms of Russell's deal were not disclosed.

Nearly a week later, on March 14, the Browns terminated the contract of fullback Terrelle Smith, prior to having to pay Smith a due roster bonus; the team also signed former Miami Dolphins offensive guard Seth McKinney to a one-year contract and former Tennessee Titans defensive end Robaire Smith to a four-year contract. On March 16, the Browns signed former Bengals defensive tackle Shaun Smith to a four-year contract. Four days later, on March 20, the team re-signed offensive guard Lennie Friedman to a one-year contract; the team also lost defensive end Alvin McKinley to the Denver Broncos.

On March 29, it was revealed that Browns general manager Phil Savage entered into talks with Kansas City Chiefs general manager Carl Peterson regarding their veteran quarterback, Trent Green. However, Green was instead traded to the Miami Dolphins.

On April 2, the team signed former San Francisco 49ers safety Mike Adams to a two-year contract. On April 14, the Browns re-signed veteran tight end Steve Heiden to a four-year contract extension, though terms of his deal were not disclosed. On April 16, the Browns signed former Ravens fullback Alan Ricard to a one-year contract, though terms of his deal were not disclosed; the team also formally announced the signing of former San Diego Chargers tight end Ryan Krause, though the date he was signed and the terms of his deal were not disclosed. On April 19, the Browns re-signed defensive tackle Ethan Kelley to the terms of a one-year contract.

On April 25, the Browns resigned free agents Simon Fraser and Mason Unck each to one-year contracts. On April 27, the Browns resigned free agent offensive lineman Nat Dorsey to a one-year contract. On May 2, the team waived offensive lineman Joe Andruzzi. Following his release, Andruzzi was hospitalized with lymphoma. The Browns release a statement wishing Andruzzi well, though it is not known whether his ailment is the reason the Browns released Andruzzi.

On May 3, the Browns announced the signings of nine undrafted free agents. Those players are: Jesse Ainsworth, a placekicker from Arizona State; Charles Ali, a fullback from Arkansas (Pine Bluff); Mike Alston, a linebacker from Toledo; Rick Drushal, an offensive lineman from Wooster; Hunter Funtaine, a linebacker from Vanderbilt; Mike Mason, a wide receiver from Tennessee State; Tyrone Moss, a halfback from Miami (Florida); Brent Pousson, an offensive lineman from McNeese State; and Scott Stephenson, an offensive lineman from Iowa State. The team also signed three try-out rookies on May 8, signing linebacker Kevin Sears, offensive lineman Cliff Louis and running back Jerome Jackson.

On June 17, the Browns waived cornerback Antonio Perkins, fullback Alan Ricard, and offensive linemen Brent Pousson and Scott Stephenson. On June 26, the team waived safety Ben Emanuel and claimed former Tampa Bay Buccaneer wide receiver Efrem Hill from waivers.

=== 2007 NFL draft ===
Prior to the 2007 NFL draft, the Browns were set to utilize either the third pick or fourth pick of the first round. This discrepancy was because the Browns and the Tampa Bay Buccaneers had similar records and strength-of-schedule averages. After the coin toss, it was determined that the Browns will use the third pick of the draft. The 2007 NFL Draft was held on April 28 and 29, 2007 in New York City.

Draft		Player name	Position	College	Height	Weight
Rnd	Pick	Player name	Position	College	Height	Weight
1	3	Joe Thomas	Offensive tackle	Wisconsin	6 ft 6 in	313 lbs
1	22	Brady Quinn	Quarterback	Notre Dame	6 ft 3 in	226 lbs
2	53	Eric Wright	Cornerback	UNLV	5 ft 11 in	190 lbs
5	140	Brandon McDonald	Cornerback	Memphis	5 ft 11 in	181 lbs
6	200	Melila Purcell	Defensive end	Hawaii	6 ft 5 in	269 lbs
7	213	Chase Pittman	Defensive end	LSU	6 ft 5 in	273 lbs
7	234	Syndric Steptoe	Wide receiver	Arizona	5 ft 9 in	182 lbs

The Browns selected Wisconsin offensive tackle Joe Thomas with the third overall pick of the draft. However, the Browns selected Quinn with the 22nd selection of the draft, following a trade with the Dallas Cowboys, which saw the Browns send their second-round pick of the 2007 draft and their first-round pick of the 2008 NFL draft to the Cowboys for their first-round pick at number 22. During the second round of the draft, the Browns made another trade with the Cowboys, this time using the selection to pick UNLV cornerback Eric Wright. The Browns gave up their third- and fourth-round picks of the draft, and swapped their sixth-round pick with the Cowboys. The Browns would've gotten the third overall pick anyway, as they lost to the Buccaneers the previous season.

On the second day of the draft, the Browns looked to fill holes left by departing players through free agency. In the fifth round, the Browns drafted Memphis cornerback Brandon McDonald; in the sixth round, the Browns drafted Hawaii defensive end Melila Purcell; and in the seventh round, the Browns drafted LSU defensive end Chase Pittman and Arizona wide receiver Syndric Steptoe.

On July 18, the Browns signed the first of their seven draft picks, signing Pittman to a four-year contract. On July 22, the Browns signed three more draft picks, this time signing McDonald, Purcell and Steptoe each to four-year contracts. Steptoe is likely to compete to be the team's starting punt-returner heading into the 2007 season. On July 26, the Browns signed Thomas to a six-year contract (voidable after five years) and Wright to a four-year contract. Thomas and Wright will look to battle to become the starters at left tackle and cornerback respectively.

Until August 7, the Browns and Brady Quinn could not agree on a contract, and the quarterback missed nearly two weeks of training camp. The parties then agreed, in principle, to a contract. Hours later, the team and Quinn finalized the contract, and Quinn signed with the team under the terms of a five-year contract. The contract is worth $20 million.

== Coaching staff ==
Cleveland Browns 2007 coaching staff
Head coaches: Head coach – Romeo Crennel; Assistant head coach/quarterbacks – Rip Scherer; Assistant to the head coach – Chris Caminiti; Offensive coaches: Offensive coordinator – Rob Chudzinski; Running backs – Anthony Lynn; Wide receivers – Wes Chandler; Tight ends – Alfredo Roberts; Offensive line – Steve Marshall; Offensive line – Mike Sullivan; Senior offensive assistant – Dave Atkins; Offensive assistant – Frank Verducci	Defensive coaches: Defensive coordinator – Todd Grantham; Defensive line – Randy Melvin; Linebackers – Mike Haluchak; Defensive backs – Mel Tucker; Defensive assistant – Bob Trott; Defensive quality control – Umberto Leone; Special teams coaches: Special teams coordinator – Ted Daisher; Assistant special teams/secondary – Cory Undlin; Strength and conditioning: Head strength and conditioning – Tom Myslinski; Assistant strength and conditioning – Alan DeGennaro

== Final roster ==
2007 Cleveland Browns roster
Quarterbacks (QB): 3 Derek Anderson; 11 Ken Dorsey; 10 Brady Quinn; Running backs (RB): 41 Charles Ali FB; 35 Jerome Harrison; 31 Jamal Lewis; 47 Lawrence Vickers FB; 29 Jason Wright; Wide receivers (WR): 86 Tim Carter; 16 Josh Cribbs; 17 Braylon Edwards; 84 Joe Jurevicius; 81 Travis Wilson; Tight ends (TE): 87 Darnell Dinkins; 82 Steve Heiden; 80 Kellen Winslow II	Offensive linemen (OL): 70 Nat Dorsey T; 66 Hank Fraley C; 62 Lennie Friedman G; 50 Marvin Philip C; 77 Kevin Shaffer T; 61 Isaac Sowells G; 65 Eric Steinbach G; 73 Joe Thomas T; 72 Ryan Tucker G; Defensive linemen (DL): 75 Simon Fraser DE; 96 Bobby Hamilton DE; 93 Louis Leonard NT; 60 Melila Purcell DE; 99 Orpheus Roye DE; 98 Robaire Smith DE; 91 Shaun Smith NT	Linebackers (LB): 59 Keith Adams ILB; 54 Andra Davis ILB; 58 D'Qwell Jackson ILB; 55 Willie McGinest OLB; 90 David McMillan OLB; 56 Antwan Peek OLB; 51 Chaun Thompson OLB; 94 Leon Williams ILB; 95 Kamerion Wimbley OLB; Defensive backs (DB): 28 Leigh Bodden CB; 30 Ricardo Colclough CB; 39 Daven Holly CB; 26 Sean Jones SS; 22 Brandon McDonald CB; 21 Brodney Pool FS; 27 Nick Sorensen SS; 24 Eric Wright CB; 25 Kenny Wright CB; Special teams (ST): 4 Phil Dawson K; 64 Ryan Pontbriand LS; 15 Dave Zastudil P	Practice squad: 33 Kory Chapman RB; 85 Brad Cieslak TE; 37 A. J. Davis CB; 63 Cliff Louis OT; 97 Chase Pittman DE; 83 Steve Sanders WR; 12 Syndric Steptoe WR; 79 Zach West DE; Reserve: 20 Mike Adams S (IR); 23 Gary Baxter CB (IR); 57 LeCharles Bentley C (PUP); 53 Kris Griffin LB (IR); 5 Efrem Hill WR (IR); 78 Ethan Kelley NT (IR); 68 Seth McKinney G (IR); -- Justin Sandy S (IR); 52 Matt Stewart LB (IR); 92 Ted Washington NT (IR); Rookies in italics 53 active, 10 reserve, 8 practice squad

== Preseason ==
=== Schedule ===
Week	Date	Opponent	Result	Record	Venue	Recap
1	August 11	Kansas City Chiefs	W 16–12	1–0	Cleveland Browns Stadium	Recap
2	August 18	Detroit Lions	L 20–23	1–1	Cleveland Browns Stadium	Recap
3	August 25	at Denver Broncos	W 31–7	2–1	Invesco Field at Mile High	Recap
4	August 30	at Chicago Bears	W 19–9	3–1	Soldier Field	Recap

== Regular season ==
=== Schedule ===
Week	Date	Opponent	Result	Record	Venue	Recap
1	September 9	Pittsburgh Steelers	L 7–34	0–1	Cleveland Browns Stadium	Recap
2	September 16	Cincinnati Bengals	W 51–45	1–1	Cleveland Browns Stadium	Recap
3	September 23	at Oakland Raiders	L 24–26	1–2	McAfee Coliseum	Recap
4	September 30	Baltimore Ravens	W 27–13	2–2	Cleveland Browns Stadium	Recap
5	October 7	at New England Patriots	L 17–34	2–3	Gillette Stadium	Recap
6	October 14	Miami Dolphins	W 41–31	3–3	Cleveland Browns Stadium	Recap
7	Bye					
8	October 28	at St. Louis Rams	W 27–20	4–3	Edward Jones Dome	Recap
9	November 4	Seattle Seahawks	W 33–30	5–3	Cleveland Browns Stadium	Recap
10	November 11	at Pittsburgh Steelers	L 28–31	5–4	Heinz Field	Recap
11	November 18	at Baltimore Ravens	W 33–30 (OT)	6–4	M&T Bank Stadium	Recap
12	November 25	Houston Texans	W 27–17	7–4	Cleveland Browns Stadium	Recap
13	December 2	at Arizona Cardinals	L 21–27	7–5	University of Phoenix Stadium	Recap
14	December 9	at New York Jets	W 24–18	8–5	Giants Stadium	Recap
15	December 16	Buffalo Bills	W 8–0	9–5	Cleveland Browns Stadium	Recap
16	December 23	at Cincinnati Bengals	L 14–19	9–6	Paul Brown Stadium	Recap
17	December 30	San Francisco 49ers	W 20–7	10–6	Cleveland Browns Stadium	Recap

== Standings ==
AFC North
	W	L	T	PCT	DIV	CONF	PF	PA	STK
^{(4)} Pittsburgh Steelers	10	6	0	.625	5–1	7–5	393	269	L1
Cleveland Browns	10	6	0	.625	3–3	7–5	402	382	W1
Cincinnati Bengals	7	9	0	.438	3–3	6–6	380	385	W2
Baltimore Ravens	5	11	0	.313	1–5	2–10	275	384	W1

== Regular season week-by-week results ==
=== Week 1: vs. Pittsburgh Steelers ===
Week 1: Pittsburgh Steelers at Cleveland Browns – Game summary

Quarter	1	2	3	4	Total
Steelers	17	0	14	3	34
Browns	0	0	7	0	7

at Cleveland Browns Stadium, Cleveland, Ohio

- Game time: 1:00 PM EDT/12:00 PM CDT
- Game weather: 73 °F (21.7 °C), (Light Rain), Winds variable 5–12 MPH
- Game attendance: 73,089
- Referee: Scott Green
- TV announcers (CBS): Kevin Harlan and Rich Gannon

Game information

First quarter

- PIT – Hines Ward 5-yard pass from Ben Roethlisberger (Jeff Reed kick). Steelers 7–0. Drive: 4 plays, 22 yards, 2:01.
- PIT – Jeff Reed 26-yard field goal. Steelers 10–0. Drive: 4 plays, 9 yards, 1:54.
- PIT – Santonio Holmes 40-yard pass from Ben Roethlisberger (Jeff Reed kick). Steelers 17–0. Drive: 1 play, 40 yards, 0:07.

Second quarter

- No scoring plays.

Third quarter

- PIT – Matt Spaeth 5-yard pass from Ben Roethlisberger (Jeff Reed kick). Steelers 24–0. Drive: 8 plays, 71 yards, 4:27.
- CLE – Lawrence Vickers 1-yard pass from Derek Anderson (Phil Dawson kick). Steelers 24–7. Drive: 7 plays, 76 yards, 3:41.
- PIT – Heath Miller 22-yard pass from Ben Roethlisberger (Jeff Reed kick). Steelers 31–7. Drive: 8 plays, 64 yards, 4:29.

Fourth quarter

- PIT – Jeff Reed 31-yard field goal. Steelers 34–7. Drive: 13 plays, 72 yards, 8:00.

Top passers

- PIT – Ben Roethlisberger – 12/23, 161 yards, 4 TD
- CLE – Derek Anderson – 13/28, 184 yards, TD, INT

Top rushers

- PIT – Willie Parker – 27 rushes, 109 yards
- CLE – Jamal Lewis – 11 rushes, 35 yards

Top receivers

- PIT – Santonio Holmes – 2 receptions, 55 yards, TD
- CLE – Kellen Winslow – 4 receptions, 83 yards

Charlie Frye started the game, but was benched before halftime. In the week following the game, he was traded to the Seattle Seahawks for a sixth-round draft pick, and Derek Anderson was named the starter for the rest of the season.

=== Week 2: vs. Cincinnati Bengals ===
Week 2: Cincinnati Bengals at Cleveland Browns – Game summary

Quarter	1	2	3	4	Total
Bengals	7	14	17	7	45
Browns	6	21	14	10	51

at Cleveland Browns Stadium, Cleveland, Ohio

- Game time: 1:00 PM EDT/12:00 PM CDT
- Game weather: 63 °F (15.0 °C), (Partly Cloudy), Wind SW 6–13 MPH
- Game attendance: 72,801
- Referee: Peter Morelli
- TV announcers (CBS): Bill Macatee and Steve Beuerlein

Game information

First quarter

- CIN – Rudi Johnson 13-yard pass from Carson Palmer (Shayne Graham kick), Bengals 7–0. Drive: 8 plays, 70 yards, 4:28.
- CLE – Phil Dawson 39 yard field goal, Bengals 7–3. Drive: 7 plays, 15 yards, 2:59.
- CLE – Phil Dawson 39 yard field goal, Bengals 7–6. Drive: 9 plays, 59 yards, 3:24.

Second quarter

- CLE – Joe Jurevicius 17-yard pass from Derek Anderson (Phil Dawson kick), Browns 13–7. Drive: 7 plays, 49 yards, 3:40.
- CIN – T. J. Houshmandzadeh 23-yard pass from Carson Palmer (Shayne Graham kick), Bengals 14–13. Drive: 7 plays, 67 yards, 3:23.
- CLE – Joe Jurevicius 9-yard pass from Derek Anderson (Phil Dawson kick), Browns 20–14. Drive: 3 plays, 11 yards, 1:01.
- CIN – Chad Johnson 22-yard pass from Carson Palmer (Shayne Graham kick), Bengals 21–20. Drive: 7 plays, 88 yards, 3:26.
- CLE – Kellen Winslow II 25-yard pass from Derek Anderson (Phil Dawson kick), Browns 27–21. Drive: 5 plays, 88 yards, 2:00.'

Third quarter

- CIN – Shayne Graham 20 yard field goal, Browns 27–24. Drive: 5 plays, 23 yards, 2:45.
- CLE – Braylon Edwards 34-yard pass from Derek Anderson (Phil Dawson kick), Browns 34–24. Drive: 8 plays, 78 yards, 3:52.
- CIN – Chad Johnson 14-yard pass from Carson Palmer (Shayne Graham kick), Browns 34–31. Drive: 4 plays, 34 yards, 2:06.
- CLE – Jamal Lewis 66-yard run (Phil Dawson kick), Browns 41–31. Drive: 1 play, 66 yards, 0:17.
- CIN – T. J. Houshmandzadeh 5-yard pass from Carson Palmer (Shayne Graham kick), Browns 41–38. Drive: 9 plays, 63 yards, 5:05.

Fourth quarter

- CLE – Braylon Edwards 37-yard pass from Derek Anderson (Phil Dawson kick), Browns 48–38. Drive: 5 plays, 92 yards, 3:08.
- CLE – Phil Dawson 18 yard field goal, Browns 51–38. Drive: 6 plays, 69 yards, 2:45.
- CIN – Glenn Holt 7-yard pass from Carson Palmer (Shayne Graham kick), Browns 51–45. Drive: 11 plays, 64 yards, 2:05 .

Top passers

- CIN – Carson Palmer – 33/50, 401 yards, 6 TD, 2 INT
- CLE – Derek Anderson – 20/33, 328 yards, 5 TD, INT

Top rushers

- CIN – Rudi Johnson – 23 rushes, 118 yards
- CLE – Jamal Lewis – 27 rushes, 216 yards, TD

Top receivers

- CIN – Chad Johnson – 11 receptions, 209 yards, 2 TD
- CLE – Braylon Edwards – 8 receptions, 146 yards, 2 TD

=== Week 3: at Oakland Raiders ===
Week 3: Cleveland Browns at Oakland Raiders – Game summary

Quarter	1	2	3	4	Total
Browns	0	10	7	7	24
Raiders	3	13	7	3	26

at McAfee Coliseum, Oakland, California

- Game time: 4:05 PM EDT/3:05 PM CDT
- Game weather: 67 °F (19.4 °C), Wind WNW 10 MPH, Partly Cloudy
- Game attendance: 51,075
- Referee: John Parry
- TV announcers (CBS): Bill Macatee and Steve Beuerlein

Game information

- First quarter
- OAK – Sebastian Janikowski 32-yard field goal, 0:37. Raiders 3–0. Drive: 10 plays, 69 yards, 5:34.

Second quarter

- OAK – Sebastian Janikowski 22-yard field goal, 11:00. Raiders 6–0. Drive: 6 plays, 20 yards, 2:35.
- OAK – Ronald Curry 41-yard pass from Josh McCown (Sebastian Janikowski kick), 4:45. Raiders 13–0. Drive: 8 plays, 93 yards, 4:03.
- OAK – Sebastian Janikowski 23-yard field goal, 2:05. Raiders 16–0. Drive: 4 plays, 2 yards, 1:35.
- CLE – Josh Cribbs 99-yard kickoff return (Phil Dawson kick), 1:53. Raiders 16–7.
- CLE – Phil Dawson 23-yard field goal, 0:11. Raiders 16–10. Drive: 8 plays, 24 yards, 1:28.

Third quarter

- CLE – Braylon Edwards 21-yard pass from Derek Anderson (Phil Dawson kick), 9:16. Browns 17–16. Drive: 4 plays, 52 yards, 1:22.
- OAK – LaMont Jordan 1-yard run (Sebastian Janikowski kick), 0:10. Raiders 23–17. Drive: 15 plays, 69 yards, 9:06.

Fourth quarter

- OAK – Sebastian Janikowski 48-yard field goal, 8:11. Raiders 26–17. Drive: 11 plays, 55 yards, 5:58.
- CLE – Derek Anderson 1-yard run (Phil Dawson kick), 3:33. Raiders 26–24. Drive: 10 plays, 80 yards, 4:38.

Top passers

- CLE – Derek Anderson – 18/37, 248 yards, TD, 2 INT
- OAK – Daunte Culpepper – 8/14, 118 yards

Top rushers

- CLE – Jamal Lewis – 15 rushes, 56 yards
- OAK – LaMont Jordan – 29 rushes, 121 yards, TD

Top receivers

- CLE – Kellen Winslow – 6 receptions, 88 yards
- OAK – Ronald Curry – 3 receptions, 62 yards, TD

=== Week 4: vs. Baltimore Ravens ===
Week 4: Baltimore Ravens at Cleveland Browns – Game summary

Quarter	1	2	3	4	Total
Ravens	0	6	0	7	13
Browns	14	10	3	0	27

at Cleveland Browns Stadium, Cleveland, Ohio

- Game time: 1:00 PM EDT/12:00 PM CDT
- Game weather: 77 °F or 25 °C (Sunny)
- Game attendance: 73,024
- Referee: Ron Winter
- TV announcers (CBS): Kevin Harlan and Rich Gannon

Game information

First quarter

- CLE – Joe Jurevicius 2-yard pass from Derek Anderson (Phil Dawson kick), 9:46. Browns 7–0. Drive: 9 plays, 55 yards, 5:14.
- CLE – Braylon Edwards 78-yard pass from Derek Anderson (Phil Dawson kick), 5:46. Browns 14–0. Drive: 1 play, 78 yards, 0:08.

Second quarter

- BAL – Matt Stover 21-yard field goal, 12:45. Browns 14–3. Drive: 6 plays, 21 yards, 2:27.
- CLE – Phil Dawson 41-yard field goal, 9:17. Browns 17–3. Drive: 8 plays, 49 yards, 3:28.
- CLE – Jamal Lewis 1-yard run (Phil Dawson kick), 4:52. Browns 24–3. Drive: 8 plays, 31 yards, 4:18.
- BAL – Matt Stover 29-yard field goal, 0:52. Browns 24–6. Drive: 11 plays, 68 yards, 4:00.

Third quarter

- CLE – Phil Dawson 20-yard field goal, 4:12. Browns 27–6. Drive: 9 plays, 66 yards, 4:37.

Fourth quarter

- BAL – Quinn Sypniewski 4-yard pass from Steve McNair (Matt Stover kick), 7:14. Browns 27–13. Drive: 13 plays, 85 yards, 6:27.

Top passers

- BAL – Steve McNair – 34/53, 307 yards, TD, INT
- CLE – Derek Anderson – 10/18, 204 yards, 2 TD, INT

Top rushers

- BAL – Willis McGahee – 14 rushes, 104 yards
- CLE – Jamal Lewis – 23 rushes, 64 yards, TD

Top receivers

- BAL – Derrick Mason – 10 receptions, 78 yards
- CLE – Braylon Edwards – 3 receptions, 97 yards, TD

=== Week 5: at New England Patriots ===
Week 5: Cleveland Browns at New England Patriots – Game summary

Quarter	1	2	3	4	Total
Browns	0	0	3	14	17
Patriots	10	10	0	14	34

at Gillette Stadium, Foxboro, Massachusetts

- Game time: 1:00 PM EDT/12:00 PM CDT
- Game weather: 56 °F or 13.3 °C (overcast)
- Game attendance: 68,756
- Referee: Walt Coleman
- TV announcers (CBS): Greg Gumbel and Dan Dierdorf

Game information

First quarter

- NE – Stephen Gostkowski 20-yard field goal, 8:01. Patriots 3–0. Drive: 14 plays, 78 yards, 6:59.
- NE – Donte Stallworth 34-yard pass from Tom Brady (Stephen Gostkowski kick), 2:33. Patriots 10–0. Drive: 1 play, 34 yards, 0:11.

Second quarter

- NE – Stephen Gostkowski 25-yard field goal, 6:12. Patriots 13–0. Drive: 8 plays, 44 yards, 4:17.
- NE – Benjamin Watson 7-yard pass from Tom Brady (Stephen Gostkowski kick), 1:01. Patriots 20–0. Drive: 3 plays, 25 yards, 0:46.

Third quarter

- CLE – Phil Dawson 42-yard field goal, 7:32. Patriots 20–3. Drive: 8 plays, 56 yards, 3:28.

Fourth quarter

- CLE – Tim Carter 21-yard pass from Derek Anderson (Phil Dawson kick), 14:10. Patriots 20–10. Drive: 7 plays, 55 yards, 3:50.
- NE – Benjamin Watson 25-yard pass from Tom Brady (Stephen Gostkowski kick), 9:40. Patriots 27–10. Drive: 9 plays, 71 yards, 4:30.
- CLE – Kellen Winslow II 14-yard pass from Derek Anderson (Phil Dawson kick), 5:56. Patriots 27–17. Drive: 2 plays, 35 yards, 0:48.
- NE – Randall Gay 15-yard fumble return (Stephen Gostkowski kick), 0:52. Patriots 34–17.

Top passers

- CLE – Derek Anderson – 22/43, 287 yards, 2 TD, 3 INT
- NE – Tom Brady – 22/38, 265 yards, 3 TD

Top rushers

- CLE – Jason Wright – 15 rushes, 59 yards
- NE – Sammy Morris – 21 rushes, 102 yards

Top receivers

- CLE – Braylon Edwards – 6 receptions, 110 yards
- NE – Benjamin Watson – 6 receptions, 107 yards, 2 TD

=== Week 6: vs. Miami Dolphins ===
Week 6: Miami Dolphins at Cleveland Browns – Game summary

Quarter	1	2	3	4	Total
Dolphins	3	7	14	7	31
Browns	14	13	0	14	41

at Cleveland Browns Stadium, Cleveland, Ohio

- Game time: 1:00 PM EDT/12:00 PM CDT
- Game weather: 59 °F or 15 °C (Sunny)
- Game attendance: 73,198
- Referee: Larry Nemmers
- TV announcers (CBS): Ian Eagle (play-by-play) and Solomon Wilcots (color commentator)

Game information

First quarter

- CLE – Jason Wright 1-yard run (Phil Dawson kick), 12:46. Browns 7–0. Drive: 5 plays, 45 yards, 2:14.
- MIA – Jay Feely 43-yard field goal, 6:17. Browns 7–3. Drive: 10 plays, 43 yards, 3:43.
- CLE – Derek Anderson 1-yard run (Phil Dawson kick), 0:09. Browns 14–3. Drive: 10 plays, 67 yards, 6:08.

Second quarter

- CLE – Phil Dawson 40-yard field goal, 8:50. Browns 17–3. Drive: 9 plays, 36 yards, 5:10.
- CLE – Braylon Edwards 24-yard pass from Derek Anderson (Phil Dawson kick), 6:13. Browns 24–3. Drive: 1 play, 24 yards, 0:06.
- MIA – David Martin 14-yard pass from Cleo Lemon (Jay Feely kick), 1:03. Browns 24–10. Drive: 11 plays, 80 yards, 5:10.
- CLE – Phil Dawson 20-yard field goal, 0:00. Browns 27–10. Drive: 7 plays, 70 yards, 1:03.

Third quarter

- MIA – Cleo Lemon 5-yard run (Jay Feely kick), 7:57. Browns 27–17. Drive: 14 plays, 75 yards, 7:03.
- MIA – Cleo Lemon 1-yard run (Jay Feely kick), 2:44. Browns 27–24. Drive: 9 plays, 62 yards, 3:41.

Fourth quarter

- CLE – Braylon Edwards 5-yard pass from Derek Anderson (Phil Dawson kick), 10:51. Browns 34–24. Drive: 12 plays, 66 yards, 6:53.
- CLE – Braylon Edwards 16-yard pass from Derek Anderson (Phil Dawson kick), 4:34. Browns 41–24. Drive: 9 plays, 67 yards, 4:27.
- MIA – David Martin 4-yard pass from Cleo Lemon (Jay Feely kick), 1:34. Browns 41–31. Drive: 4 plays, 26 yards, 0:51.

Top passers

- MIA – Cleo Lemon – 24/43, 256 yards, 2 TD, 2 INT
- CLE – Derek Anderson – 18/25, 245 yards, 3 TD

Top rushers

- MIA – Ronnie Brown – 19 rushes, 101 yards
- CLE – Jason Wright – 20 rushes, 59 yards, TD

Top receivers

- MIA – Chris Chambers – 6 receptions, 73 yards
- CLE – Kellen Winslow II – 5 receptions, 90 yards

=== Week 8: at St. Louis Rams ===
Week 8: Cleveland Browns at St. Louis Rams – Game summary

Quarter	1	2	3	4	Total
Browns	3	14	7	3	27
Rams	14	3	3	0	20

at Edward Jones Dome, St. Louis, Missouri

- Game time: 1:00 PM EDT/12:00 PM CDT
- Game weather: Indoors
- Game attendance: 62,777
- Referee: Mike Carey
- TV announcers (CBS): Don Criqui and Steve Beuerlein

Game information

First quarter

- STL – Steven Jackson 2-yard run (Jeff Wilkins kick), 11:37. Rams 7–0. Drive: 6 plays, 78 yards, 3:23.
- STL – Torry Holt 1-yard pass from Marc Bulger (Jeff Wilkins kick), 5:06. Rams 14–0. Drive: 10 plays, 45 yards, 5:21.
- CLE – Phil Dawson 35-yard field goal, 2:38. Rams 14–3. Drive: 7 plays, 45 yards, 2:28.

Second quarter

- CLE – Braylon Edwards 12-yard pass from Derek Anderson (Phil Dawson kick), 8:22. Rams 14–10. Drive: 9 plays, 67 yards, 5:04.
- CLE – Kellen Winslow II 21-yard pass from Derek Anderson (Phil Dawson kick), 1:11. Browns 17–14. Drive: 8 plays, 65 yards, 4:13.
- STL – Jeff Wilkins 40-yard field goal, 0:03. Tied 17–17. Drive: 8 plays, 52 yards, 1:08.

Third quarter

- CLE – Braylon Edwards 5-yard pass from Derek Anderson (Phil Dawson kick), 8:44. Browns 24–17. Drive: 12 plays, 80 yards, 6:16.
- STL – Jeff Wilkins 46-yard field goal, 3:26. Browns 24–20. Drive: 12 plays, 48 yards, 5:18.

Fourth quarter

- CLE – Phil Dawson 45-yard field goal, 10:35. Browns 27–20. Drive: 12 plays, 45 yards, 7:51.

Top passers

- CLE – Derek Anderson – 18/25, 248 yards, 3 TD
- STL – Marc Bulger – 24/36, 310 yards, TD, INT

Top rushers

- CLE – Jamal Lewis – 17 rushes, 61 yards
- STL – Steven Jackson – 8 rushes, 41 yards, TD

Top receivers

- CLE – Braylon Edwards – 8 receptions, 117 yards, 2 TD
- STL – Torry Holt – 6 receptions, 110 yards, TD

=== Week 9: vs. Seattle Seahawks ===
Week 9: Seattle Seahawks at Cleveland Browns – Game summary

Quarter	1	2	3	4	OT	Total
Seahawks	7	14	3	6	0	30
Browns	0	9	7	14	3	33

at Cleveland Browns Stadium, Cleveland, Ohio

- Game time: 4:05 PM EST/3:05 PM CST
- Game weather: 48 °F (8.9 °C), (Cloudy), winds W 6 MPH
- Game attendance: 72,927
- Referee: Gene Steratore
- TV announcers (Fox): Sam Rosen and Tim Ryan

Game information

First quarter

- SEA – Bobby Engram 5-yard pass from Matt Hasselbeck (Josh Brown kick), 5:13. Seahawks 7–0. Drive: 7 plays, 80 yards, 4:12.

Second quarter

- CLE – Jamal Lewis 2-yard run (kick failed), 12:49. Seahawks 7–6. Drive: 9 plays, 57 yards, 4:58.
- SEA – D. J. Hackett 6-yard pass from Matt Hasselbeck (Josh Brown kick), 6:23. Seahawks 14–6. Drive: 12 plays, 78 yards, 6:26.
- SEA – Nate Burleson 94-yard punt return (Josh Brown kick), 3:49. Seahawks 21–6.
- CLE – Phil Dawson 19-yard field goal, 0:21. Seahawks 21–9. Drive: 9 plays, 54 yards, 1:24.

Third quarter

- CLE – Jamal Lewis 1-yard run (Phil Dawson kick), 8:57. Seahawks 21–16. Drive: 11 plays, 69 yards, 6:03.
- SEA – Josh Brown 39-yard field goal, 5:06. Seahawks 24–16. Drive: 10 plays, 19 yards, 3:51.

Fourth quarter

- CLE – Jamal Lewis 2-yard run (pass failed), 12:42. Seahawks 24–22. Drive: 10 plays, 54 yards, 5:06.
- SEA – Josh Brown 26-yard field goal, 7:55. Seahawks 27–22. Drive: 9 plays, 65 yards, 4:47.
- CLE – Jamal Lewis 1-yard run (Derek Anderson pass), 2:17. Browns 30–27. Drive: 14 plays, 89 yards, 5:38.
- SEA – Josh Brown 22-yard field goal, 0:00. Tied 30–30. Drive: 13 plays, 67 yards, 2:17.

Overtime

- Phil Dawson 25-yard field goal, 10:00. Browns 33–30. Drive: 6 plays, 49 yards, 12:45.

Top passers

- SEA – Matt Hasselbeck – 30/47, 318 yards, 2 TD, INT
- CLE – Derek Anderson – 29/48, 364 yards, INT

Top rushers

- SEA – Maurice Morris – 9 rushes, 55 yards
- CLE – Jamal Lewis – 20 rushes, 37 yards, 4 TD

Top receivers

- SEA – Bobby Engram – 14 receptions, 139 yards, TD
- CLE – Kellen Winslow II – 11 receptions, 125 yards

=== Week 10: at Pittsburgh Steelers ===
Week 10: Cleveland Browns at Pittsburgh Steelers – Game summary

Quarter	1	2	3	4	Total
Browns	7	14	0	7	28
Steelers	3	6	7	15	31

at Heinz Field, Pittsburgh, Pennsylvania

- Game time: 1:00 PM EST
- Game weather: 40 °F or 4.4 °C (Cloudy)
- Game attendance: 64,781
- Referee: Ron Winter
- TV announcers (CBS): Jim Nantz (play-by-play) & Phil Simms (color commentator)

Game information

First quarter

- CLE – Kellen Winslow II 4-yard pass from Derek Anderson (Phil Dawson kick), 4:10. Browns 7–0. Drive: 16 plays, 71 yards, 8:55.
- PIT – Jeff Reed 28-yard field goal, 1:29. Browns 7–3. Drive: 7 plays, 52 yards, 2:41.

Second quarter

- CLE – Lawrence Vickers 2-yard pass from Derek Anderson (Phil Dawson kick), 14:56. Browns 14–3. Drive: 4 plays, 3 yards, 1:33.
- PIT – Jeff Reed 35-yard field goal, 9:02. Browns 14–6. Drive: 10 plays, 54 yards, 5:54.
- CLE – Braylon Edwards 16-yard pass from Derek Anderson (Phil Dawson kick), 5:24. Browns 21–6. Drive: 3 plays, 18 yards, 0:59.
- PIT – Jeff Reed 35-yard field goal, 0:05. Browns 21–9. Drive: 15 plays, 57 yards, 5:20.

Third quarter

- PIT – Hines Ward 12-yard pass from Ben Roethlisberger (Jeff Reed kick), 6:14. Browns 21–16. Drive: 4 plays, 38 yards, 2:04.

Fourth quarter

- PIT – Ben Roethlisberger 30-yard run (Ben Roethlisberger pass to Hines Ward), 11:32. Steelers 24–21. Drive: 7 plays, 66 yards, 3:15.
- CLE – Josh Cribbs 100-yard kickoff return (Phil Dawson kick), 11:14. Browns 28–24.
- PIT – Heath Miller 2-yard pass from Ben Roethlisberger (Jeff Reed kick), 3:13. Steelers 31–24. Drive: 14 plays, 78 yards, 8:01.

Top passers

- CLE – Derek Anderson – 16/35, 123 yards, 3 TD
- PIT – Ben Roethlisberger – 23/34, 278 yards, 2 TD, INT

Top rushers

- CLE – Jamal Lewis – 16 rushes, 35 yards
- PIT – Willie Parker – 25 rushes, 105 yards

Top receivers

- CLE – Kellen Winslow II – 5 receptions, 46 yards, TD
- PIT – Hines Ward – 7 receptions, 80 yards, TD

=== Week 11: at Baltimore Ravens ===
Week 11: Cleveland Browns at Baltimore Ravens – Game summary

Quarter	1	2	3	4	OT	Total
Browns	3	10	14	3	3	33
Ravens	0	7	7	16	0	30

at M&T Bank Stadium, Baltimore, Maryland

- Game time: 1:00 PM EST/12:00 PM CST
- Game weather: 53 °F or 11.7 °C (Light Rain)
- Game attendance: 71,055
- Referee: Pete Morelli
- TV announcers (CBS): Ian Eagle (play-by-play) and Solomon Wilcots (color commentator)

Game information

First quarter

- CLE – Phil Dawson 28-yard field goal, 2:34. Browns 3–0. Drive: 6 plays, 12 yards, 2:13.

Second quarter

- CLE – Jamal Lewis 1-yard run (Phil Dawson kick), 12:23. Browns 10–0. Drive: 6 plays, 80 yards, 2:56.
- BAL – Ray Lewis 35-yard interception return (Matt Stover kick), 8:47. Browns 10–7.
- CLE – Phil Dawson 39-yard field goal, 2:34. Browns 13–7. Drive: 13 plays, 21 yards, 7:06.

Third quarter

- BAL – Willis McGahee 2-yard run (Matt Stover kick), 10:42. Ravens 14–13. Drive: 8 plays, 75 yards, 4:18.
- CLE – Derek Anderson 1-yard run (Phil Dawson kick), 6:01. Browns 20–14. Drive: 3 plays, 11 yards, 0:59.
- CLE – Brodney Pool 100-yard interception return (Phil Dawson kick), 3:42. Browns 27–14.

Fourth quarter

- BAL – Matt Stover 34-yard field goal, 12:13. Browns 27–17. Drive: 14 plays, 69 yards, 6:29.
- BAL – Matt Stover 41-yard field goal, 7:20. Browns 27–20. Drive: 9 plays, 44 yards, 2:28.
- BAL – Devard Darling 27-yard pass from Kyle Boller (Matt Stover kick), 3:31. Tied 27–27. Drive: 4 plays, 83 yards, 1:41.
- BAL – Matt Stover 47-yard field goal, 0:26. Ravens 30–27. Drive: 10 plays, 49 yards, 1:23.
- CLE – Phil Dawson 51-yard field goal, 0:00. Tied 30–30. Drive: 3 plays, 23 yards, 0:26.

Overtime

- CLE – Phil Dawson 33-yard field goal, 9:10. Browns 33–30. Drive: 9 plays, 43 yards, 5:50.

Top passers

- CLE – Derek Anderson – 24/38, 274 yards, INT
- BAL – Kyle Boller – 22/41, 279 yards, TD, 2 INT

Top rushers

- CLE – Jamal Lewis – 22 rushes, 92 yards, TD
- BAL – Willis McGahee – 21 rushes, 102 yards, TD

Top receivers

- CLE – Braylon Edwards – 8 receptions, 85 yards
- BAL – Devard Darling – 4 receptions, 107 yards, TD

This game was notable for Phil Dawson's 51-yard game-tying field goal at the end of the 4th quarter. Dawson's kick bounced off the goal post and hit the back of the bar before falling back in front of the uprights. Although the referees initially ruled it no good, they ended up reviewing the kick, upon which it was determined that Dawson's kick had in fact crossed the uprights, and overturned the call in favor of the Browns. The Browns would go on to win the game in overtime on a shorter 33-yard field goal by Dawson.

=== Week 12: vs. Houston Texans ===
Week 12: Houston Texans at Cleveland Browns – Game summary

Quarter	1	2	3	4	Total
Texans	7	3	0	7	17
Browns	0	14	3	10	27

at Cleveland Browns Stadium, Cleveland, Ohio

- Game time: 1:00 PM EST/12:00 PM CST
- Game weather: 42 °F or 5.6 °C (Cloudy)
- Game attendance: 72,730
- Referee: Terry McAulay
- TV announcers (CBS): Gus Johnson (play-by-play) and Steve Tasker (color commentator)

Game information

First quarter

- HOU – Kevin Walter 17-yard pass from Matt Schaub (Kris Brown kick), 2:23. Texans 7–0. Drive: 6 plays, 61 yards, 2:37.

Second quarter

- CLE – Braylon Edwards 19-yard pass from Derek Anderson (Phil Dawson kick), 9:55. Tied 7–7. Drive: 6 plays, 70 yards, 2:39.
- HOU – Kris Brown 41-yard field goal, 7:13. Texans 10–7. Drive: 7 plays, 37 yards, 2:46.
- CLE – Kellen Winslow 7-yard pass from Derek Anderson (Phil Dawson kick), 0:16. Browns 14–10. Drive: 11 plays, 64 yards, 3:37.

Third quarter

- CLE – Phil Dawson 25-yard field goal, 7:26. Browns 17–10. Drive: 10 plays, 64 yards, 5:31.

Fourth quarter

- CLE – Phil Dawson 27-yard field goal, 8:35. Browns 20–10. Drive: 6 plays, 25 yards, 2:51.
- CLE – Jamal Lewis 1-yard run (Phil Dawson kick), 5:48. Browns 27–10. Drive: 4 plays, 30 yards, 1:59.
- HOU – Owen Daniels 6-yard pass from Matt Schaub (Kris Brown kick), 3:12. Browns 27–17. Drive: 8 plays, 80 yards, 2:36.

Top passers

- HOU – Matt Schaub – 22/36, 256 yards, 2 TD, 2 INT
- CLE – Derek Anderson – 24/35, 253 yards, 2 TD, INT

Top rushers

- HOU – Ron Dayne – 16 rushes, 78 yards
- CLE – Jamal Lewis – 29 rushes, 134 yards, TD

Top receivers

- HOU – Owen Daniels – 7 receptions, 82 yards, TD
- CLE – Kellen Winslow – 10 receptions, 107 yards, TD

This was Terry McAulay's first game he officiated in Cleveland since the Bottlegate incident against Jacksonville on December 16, 2001.

=== Week 13: at Arizona Cardinals ===
Week 13: Cleveland Browns at Arizona Cardinals – Game summary

Quarter	1	2	3	4	Total
Browns	3	7	8	3	21
Cardinals	14	0	7	6	27

at University of Phoenix Stadium, Glendale, Arizona

- Date: December 2
- Game time: 4:05 p.m. EST/2:05 p.m. MST
- Game weather: retractable roof
- Game attendance: 64,791
- Referee: Jerome Boger
- TV announcers (CBS): Craig Bolerjack (play–by–play) and Dan Dierdorf (color commentator)

Game information

First quarter

- ARI – Roderick Hood 71-yard interception return (Neil Rackers kick), 10:45. Cardinals 7–0.
- ARI – Leonard Pope 5-yard pass from Kurt Warner (Neil Rackers kick), 4:59. Cardinals 14–0. Drive: 7 plays, 43 yards, 3:38.
- CLE – Phil Dawson 37-yard field goal, 1:41. Cardinals 14–3. Drive: 8 plays, 64 yards, 3:18.

Second quarter

- CLE – Jamal Lewis 6-yard pass from Derek Anderson (Phil Dawson kick), 1:14. Cardinals 14–10. Drive: 10 plays, 80 yards, 6:01.

Third quarter

- ARI – Bryant Johnson 1-yard pass from Kurt Warner (Neil Rackers kick), 0:43. Cardinals 21–10. Drive: 15 plays, 46 yards, 3:03.
- CLE – Braylon Edwards 67-yard pass from Derek Anderson (Derek Anderson pass to Braylon Edwards), 0:00. Cardinals 21–18. Drive: 2 plays, 69 yards, 0:43.

Fourth quarter

- ARI – Neil Rackers 33-yard field goal, 12:10. Cardinals 24–18. Drive: 6 plays, 35 yards, 2:50.
- CLE – Phil Dawson 22-yard field goal, 6:17. Cardinals 24–21. Drive: 6 plays, 49 yards, 2:59.
- ARI – Neil Rackers 19-yard field goal, 1:48. Cardinals 27–21. Drive: 11 plays, 59 yards, 4:29.

Top passers

- CLE – Derek Anderson – 21/41, 304 yards, 2 TD, 2 INT
- ARI – Kurt Warner – 18/30, 169 yards, 2 TD, INT

Top rushers

- CLE – Jamal Lewis – 16 rushes, 62 yards
- ARI – Edgerrin James – 24 rushes, 114 yards

Top receivers

- CLE – Braylon Edwards – 7 receptions, 149 yards, TD
- ARI – Bryant Johnson – 6 receptions, 56 yards, TD

=== Week 14: at New York Jets ===
Week 14: Cleveland Browns at New York Jets – Game summary

Quarter	1	2	3	4	Total
Browns	0	7	7	10	24
Jets	0	3	3	12	18

at The Meadowlands, East Rutherford, New Jersey

- Game time: 4:15 PM EST/3:15 PM CST
- Game weather: 38 °F (3.3 °C)
- Game attendance: 76,822
- Referee: Walt Anderson
- TV announcers (CBS): Dick Enberg (play-by-play) & Randy Cross (color commentator)

Game information

First quarter

- No scoring plays

Second quarter

- CLE – Jamal Lewis 7-yard pass from Derek Anderson (Phil Dawson kick), 1:15. Browns 7–0. Drive: 10 plays, 80 yards, 4:54.
- NYJ – Mike Nugent 35-yard field goal, 0:00. Browns 7–3. Drive: 7 plays, 46 yards, 1:15.

Third quarter

- CLE – Braylon Edwards 4-yard pass from Derek Anderson (Phil Dawson kick), 12:32. Browns 14–3. Drive: 5 plays, 61 yards, 2:28.
- NYJ – Mike Nugent 41-yard field goal, 2:50. Browns 14–6. Drive: 11 plays, 43 yards, 4:30.

Fourth quarter

- CLE – Phil Dawson 49-yard field goal, 12:59. Browns 17–6. Drive: 10 plays, 36 yards, 4:51.
- NYJ – Kellen Clemens 1-yard run (pass failed), 2:59. Browns 17–12. Drive: 9 plays, 69 yards, 2:28.
- NYJ – Mike Nugent 38-yard field goal, 1:43. Browns 17–15. Drive: 7 plays, 37 yards, 1:16.
- CLE – Jamal Lewis 31-yard run (Phil Dawson kick), 1:22. Browns 24–15. Drive: 3 plays, 37 yards, 0:21.
- NYJ – Mike Nugent 35-yard field goal, 0:32. Browns 24–18. Drive: 5 plays, 43 yards, 0:50.

Top passers

- CLE – Derek Anderson – 16/29, 185 yards, 2 TD, INT
- NYJ – Kellen Clemens – 24/41, 286 yards, 2 INT

Top rushers

- CLE – Jamal Lewis – 21 rushes, 118 yards, TD
- NYJ – Thomas Jones – 24 rushes, 106 yards

Top receivers

- CLE – Braylon Edwards – 3 receptions, 63 yards, TD
- NYJ – Jerricho Cotchery – 6 receptions, 119 yards

=== Week 15: vs. Buffalo Bills ===
Week 15: Buffalo Bills at Cleveland Browns – Game summary

Quarter	1	2	3	4	Total
Bills	0	0	0	0	0
Browns	3	5	0	0	8

at Cleveland Browns Stadium, Cleveland, Ohio

- Game time: 1:00 PM EST/12:00 PM CST
- Game weather: 28 °F or −2.2 °C (Light Snow)
- Game attendance: 73,196
- Referee: Walt Coleman
- TV announcers (CBS): Gus Johnson (play-by-play) & Steve Tasker (color commentator)

Game information

First quarter

- CLE – Phil Dawson 35-yard field goal, 6:51. Browns 3–0. Drive: 9 plays, 41 yards, 4:15.

Second quarter

- CLE – Brian Moorman kicked ball through end zone, 13:48. Browns 5–0.
- CLE – Phil Dawson 49-yard field goal, 1:22. Browns 8–0. Drive: 10 plays, 62 yards, 2:44.

Third quarter

- No scoring plays

Fourth quarter

- No scoring plays

Top passers

- BUF – Trent Edwards – 13/33, 124 yards
- CLE – Derek Anderson – 9/24, 137 yards

Top rushers

- BUF – Marshawn Lynch – 21 carries, 82 yards
- CLE – Jamal Lewis – 33 rushes, 163 yards

Top receivers

- BUF – Lee Evans – 4 receptions, 36 yards
- CLE – Braylon Edwards – 4 receptions, 64 yards

With the win, the Browns improved to 9–5, securing the team's first winning season since 2002 and second overall since being reactivated in 1999. The win also kept the team's playoff chances alive as the Steelers lost to the Jaguars, creating a tie for 1st place in the AFC North.

=== Week 16: at Cincinnati Bengals ===
Week 16: Cleveland Browns at Cincinnati Bengals – Game summary

Quarter	1	2	3	4	Total
Browns	0	0	7	7	14
Bengals	0	19	0	0	19

at Paul Brown Stadium, Cincinnati, Ohio

- Game time: 1:00 PM EST/12:00 PM CST
- Game weather: 30 °F or −1.1 °C (Cloudy & Windy)
- Game attendance: 66,023
- Referee: Gerry Austin
- TV announcers (CBS): Greg Gumbel (play-by-play) & Dan Dierdorf (color commentator)

Game information

First quarter

- No scoring plays

Second quarter

- CIN – Shayne Graham 29-yard field goal, 12:52. Bengals 3–0. Drive: 10 plays, 69 yards, 5:09.
- CIN – Shayne Graham 38-yard field goal, 5:04. Bengals 6–0. Drive: 10 plays, 73 yards, 4:47.
- CIN – T. J. Houshmandzadeh 5-yard pass from Carson Palmer (Shayne Graham kick), 1:05. Bengals 13–0. Drive: 1 play, 5 yards, 0:08.
- CIN – Kenny Watson 1-yard run (pass failed), 0:26. Bengals 19–0. Drive: 2 plays, 20 yards, 0:21.

Third quarter

- CLE – Braylon Edwards 2-yard pass from Derek Anderson (Phil Dawson kick), 0:40. Bengals 19–7. Drive: 11 plays, 71 yards, 5:50.

Fourth quarter

- CLE – Braylon Edwards 5-yard pass from Derek Anderson (Phil Dawson kick), 5:57. Bengals 19–14. Drive: 3 plays, 16 yards, 1:26.

Top passers

- CLE – Derek Anderson – 29/48, 251 yards, 2 TD, 4 INT
- CIN – Carson Palmer – 11/21, 115 yards, TD, 2 INT

Top rushers

- CLE – Jamal Lewis – 21 rushes, 92 yards
- CIN – Kenny Watson – 30 rushes, 130 yards, TD

Top receivers

- CLE – Kellen Winslow II – 7 receptions, 73 yards
- CIN – Chad Johnson – 4 receptions, 44 yards

Cleveland traveled to divisional rival Cincinnati, needing a win to secure the team's first playoff berth since 2002. After a scoreless first quarter, the Bengals scored 19 points in the second, 13 of which were on short drives due to two interceptions by Derek Anderson. The Browns' defense held the Bengals scoreless in the second half, while Anderson threw 2 touchdown passes. Cincinnati's last drive of the game ended in a fumble at the Cleveland 22-yard line, giving the Browns a chance to win the game with just under 2 minutes left. Cleveland would make it to Cincinnati's 29-yard line, but the game ended with an incomplete pass from Anderson.

The loss dropped the Browns to 9–6 and meant the team no longer controlled its own destiny in securing a playoff berth. The Steelers' win over the Rams and the Browns' loss meant that Pittsburgh secured the AFC North. Additionally, Tennessee's win over the New York Jets would give the Titans the AFC's last wild card spot with a win in week 17 as they held tiebreakers over the Browns.

=== Week 17: vs. San Francisco 49ers ===
Week 17: San Francisco 49ers at Cleveland Browns – Game summary

Quarter	1	2	3	4	Total
49ers	0	7	0	0	7
Browns	7	10	0	3	20

at Cleveland Browns Stadium, Cleveland, Ohio

- Game time: 1:00 PM EST/12:00 PM CST
- Game weather: 32 °F or 0 °C (Cloudy)
- Game attendance: 73,041
- Referee: Bill Carollo
- TV announcers (Fox): Matt Devlin (play-by-play) & J.C. Pearson (color commentator)

Game information

First quarter

- CLE – Josh Cribbs 76-yard punt return (Phil Dawson kick), 1:37. Browns 7–0.

Second quarter

- CLE – Braylon Edwards 45-yard pass from Derek Anderson (Phil Dawson kick), 11:44. Browns 14–0. Drive: 6 plays, 51 yards, 3:17.
- SF – Darrell Jackson 7-yard pass from Chris Weinke (Joe Nedney kick), 3:20. Browns 14–7. Drive: 10 plays, 65 yards, 4:40.
- CLE – Phil Dawson 23-yard field goal, 1:04. Browns 17–7. Drive: 11 plays, 58 yards, 2:16.

Third quarter

- No scoring plays

Fourth quarter

- CLE – Phil Dawson 49-yard field goal, 10:16. Browns 20–7. Drive: 7 plays, 44 yards, 3:59.

Top passers

- SF – Chris Weinke – 13/22, 104 yards, TD
- CLE – Derek Anderson – 11/20, 152 yards, TD, INT

Top rushers

- SF – Frank Gore – 23 rushes, 94 yards
- CLE – Jamal Lewis – 26 rushes, 128 yards

Top receivers

- SF – Darrell Jackson – 3 receptions, 28 yards, TD
- CLE – Braylon Edwards – 3 receptions, 67 yards, TD

With the win, the Browns finished the season at 10–6 for the team's first ten win season since being reactivated in 1999 and first since 1994. However, the Browns would be eliminated from postseason contention later in the day when the Tennessee Titans defeated the Indianapolis Colts to secure the AFC's last wild card spot. The Titans, who also finished 10–6, won the tiebreaker over the Browns due to having a better record against common opponents. This would be Cleveland's last winning season until 2020.

== 2008 Pro Bowl ==
Six Browns players, wide receiver Braylon Edwards, kick returner Josh Cribbs, left tackle Joe Thomas, longsnapper Ryan Pontbriand, tight end Kellen Winslow II, and quarterback Derek Anderson were named to the AFC team to represent the Cleveland Browns during the 2008 Pro Bowl. Announced on December 18, 2007, this marked the first time since the 2001 NFL season when Jamir Miller played in the 2002 Pro Bowl as a linebacker that the Browns had any player named to the Pro Bowl. It was the most selections for a Browns team since the 1995 season.

Edwards was one of the AFC's reserve wide receivers, while Cribbs started as the AFC's kick returner. Thomas, Anderson, and Winslow were all voted first alternates but all played due to injuries or other players electing not to participate in the game. Pontbriand was elected as a "needs" player by the AFC coaching staff.

Guard Eric Steinbach (1st), fullback Lawrence Vickers (2nd), and placekicker Phil Dawson (3rd) were named alternates at their respective positions.
