= 2007 All-Pro Team =

Official list of the best NFL players in 2007

The 2007 All-Pro teams were named by the Associated Press (AP), Pro Football Writers of America (PFWA), and The Sporting News (TSN) for performance in the 2007 NFL season. Both first and second teams are listed for the Associated Press.

These are the current teams that historically appear in Total Football: The Official Encyclopedia of the NFL. Although the NFL has no official awards according to the NFL spokesman Greg Aiello the NFL Record and Fact Book has historically listed All-Pro teams from major news sources such as the Associated Press, Sporting News, Pro Football Writers Association, as well as teams from organizations that no longer release All-Pro teams such as Newspaper Enterprise Association and United Press International.

The AP teams are selected by writers of the NFL. The Pro Football Writers Association team is from a poll of its more than 300 members and the editors and writers for Pro Football Weekly. The Sporting News's All-Pro team was determined through voting by professional NFL personnel directors.

== Teams ==
Offense
| Position | First team | Second team |
|---|---|---|
| Quarterback | Tom Brady, New England (AP, PFWA, SN) | Brett Favre, Green Bay (AP-2) |
| Running back | LaDainian Tomlinson, San Diego (AP, PFWA, SN); Brian Westbrook, Philadelphia (AP, PFWA); Adrian Peterson, Minnesota (SN) | Adrian Peterson, Minnesota (AP-2); Fred Taylor, Jacksonville (AP-2) |
| Fullback | Lorenzo Neal, San Diego (AP) | Tony Richardson, Minnesota (AP-2) |
| Wide receiver | Terrell Owens, Dallas (AP, PFWA); Randy Moss, New England (AP, PFWA, SN); Braylon Edwards, Cleveland (SN) | Reggie Wayne, Indianapolis (AP-2); Braylon Edwards, Cleveland (AP-2t); Wes Welker, New England (AP-2t) |
| Tight end | Jason Witten, Dallas (AP, PFWA, SN) | Tony Gonzalez, Kansas City (AP-2) |
| Tackle | Walter Jones, Seattle (AP, PFWA, SN); Matt Light, New England (AP, PFWA); Jason Peters, Buffalo (SN) | Flozell Adams, Dallas (AP-2); Jason Peters, Buffalo (AP-2) |
| Guard | Alan Faneca, Pittsburgh (AP); Logan Mankins, New England (PFWA, SN); Steve Hutchinson, Minnesota (AP, PFWA, SN) | Leonard Davis, Dallas (AP-2); Logan Mankins, New England (AP-2) |
| Center | Jeff Saturday, Indianapolis (AP, PFWA-t); Andre Gurode, Dallas (SN); Kevin Mawae, Tennessee, (PFWA-t) | Dan Koppen, New England (AP-2) |

Special teams
| Position | First team | Second team |
|---|---|---|
| Kicker | Rob Bironas, Tennessee (AP, SN); Kris Brown, Houston (PFWA) | Phil Dawson, Cleveland (AP-2) |
| Punter | Andy Lee, San Francisco (AP); Shane Lechler, Oakland (PFWA, SN) | Shane Lechler, Oakland (AP-2) |
| Kick returner | Devin Hester, Chicago (AP); Leon Washington, New York Jets (PFWA); Josh Cribbs, Cleveland (SN) | Josh Cribbs, Cleveland (AP-2) |
| Punt returner | Devin Hester, Chicago (PFWA, SN) | |
| Special teams | Kassim Osgood, San Diego (PFWA) | |

Defense
| Position | First team | Second team |
|---|---|---|
| Defensive end | Patrick Kerney, Seattle (AP, PFWA-t,); Jared Allen, Kansas City (AP, PFWA, SN); Mario Williams, Houston (SN); Ty Warren, New England, (PFWA-t) | Aaron Kampman, Green Bay (AP-2); Mario Williams, Houston (AP-2) |
| Defensive tackle | Kevin Williams, Minnesota (AP, PFWA, SN); Albert Haynesworth, Tennessee (AP, PFWA, SN) | Pat Williams, Minnesota (AP-2); Vince Wilfork, New England (AP-2) |
| Outside linebacker | DeMarcus Ware, Dallas (AP, PFWA, SN); Mike Vrabel, New England (AP, PFWA-t); Keith Bulluck, Tennessee (PFWA-t) | Shawne Merriman, San Diego (AP-2); James Harrison, Pittsburgh (AP-2) |
| Inside linebacker | Patrick Willis, San Francisco (AP, PFWA, SN); Lofa Tatupu, Seattle (AP); DeMeco Ryans, Houston (SN) | DeMeco Ryans, Houston (AP-2); Nick Barnett, Green Bay (AP-2) |
| Cornerback | Asante Samuel, New England (AP, PFWA, SN); Antonio Cromartie, San Diego (AP, PFWA); Marcus Trufant, Seattle (SN) | Champ Bailey, Denver (AP-2); Al Harris, Green Bay (AP-2) |
| Safety | Ed Reed, Baltimore (AP, PFWA, SN); Bob Sanders, Indianapolis (AP, PFWA, SN) | Darren Sharper, Minnesota (AP-2); Troy Polamalu, Pittsburgh (AP-2t); Sean Taylor, Washington (AP-2t) |

== Key ==
- AP = Associated Press first-team All-Pro
- AP-2 = Associated Press second-team All-Pro
- AP-2t = Tied for second-team All-Pro in the AP vote
- PFWA = Pro Football Writers Association All-NFL
- SN = Sporting News All-Pro
