= Braylon Edwards =

American former football player (born 1983)

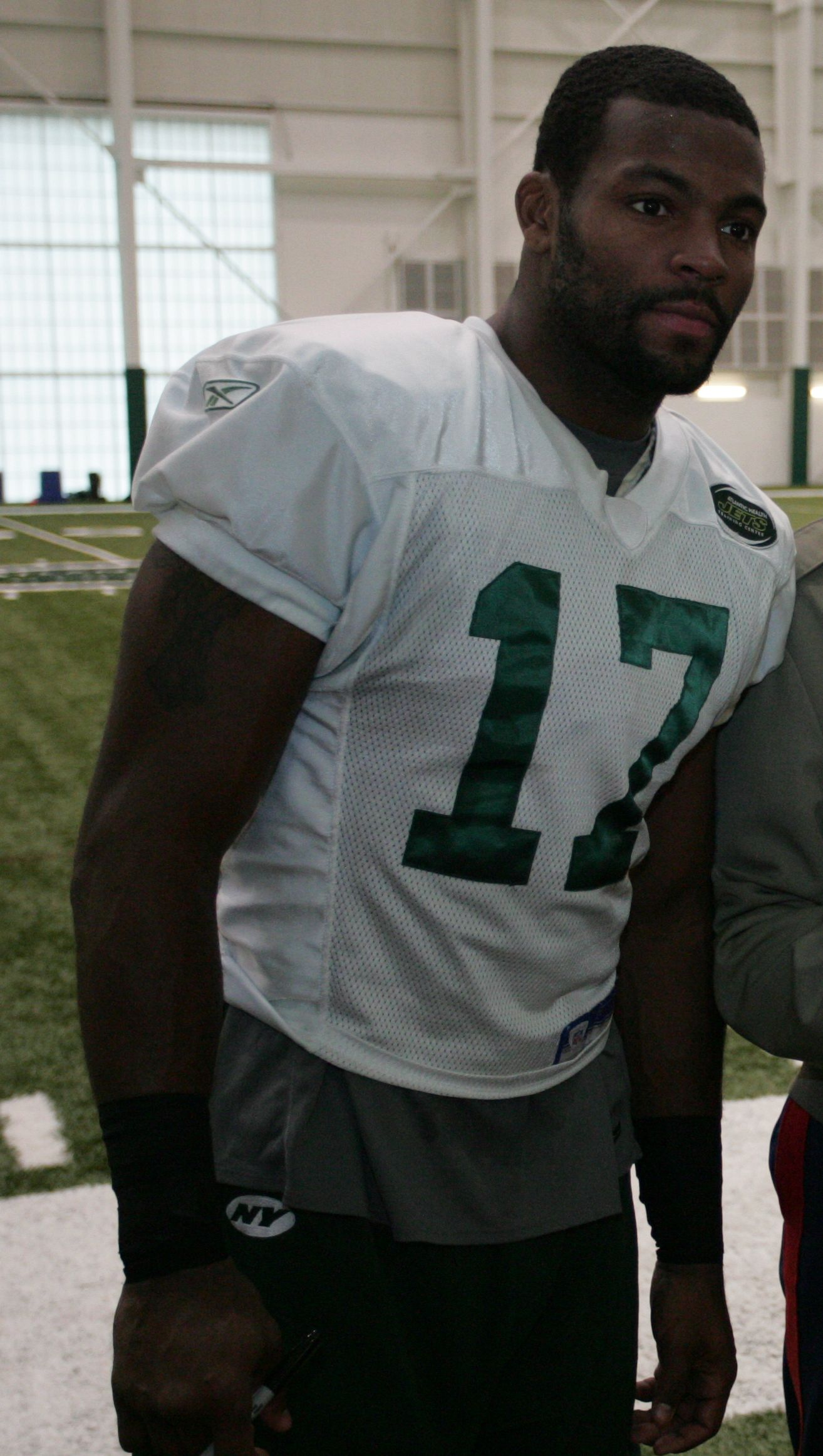
- Edwards with the New York Jets in 2009

No. 17
- Position: Wide receiver

Personal information
- Born: February 21, 1983 (age 43); Detroit, Michigan, U.S.
- Listed height: 6 ft 3 in (1.91 m)
- Listed weight: 214 lb (97 kg)

Career information
- High school: Bishop Gallagher (Harper Woods, Michigan)
- College: Michigan (2001–2004)
- NFL draft: 2005: 1st round, 3rd overall pick

Career history
- Cleveland Browns (2005–2009); New York Jets (2009–2010); San Francisco 49ers (2011); Seattle Seahawks (2012); New York Jets (2012)

Awards and highlights
- Second-team All-Pro (2007); Pro Bowl (2007); Biletnikoff Award (2004); Paul Warfield Trophy (2004); Unanimous All-American (2004); Big Ten Most Valuable Player (2004); Big Ten Offensive Player of the Year (2004); 2× First-team All-Big Ten (2003, 2004); Second-team All-Big Ten (2002)

Career NFL statistics
- Receptions: 359
- Receiving yards: 5,522
- Receiving touchdowns: 40
- Stats at Pro Football Reference

Braylon Jamel Edwards (born February 21, 1983) is an American former professional football player who was a wide receiver in the National Football League (NFL). He was a unanimous All-American playing college football for the Michigan Wolverines, winning the Biletnikoff Award in 2004. He is the all-time leader for the University of Michigan in receptions, receiving yards and receiving touchdowns. He was also the first wide receiver in Big Ten Conference history to record three consecutive 1,000-yard seasons and only the third to do so in NCAA Division I-A. He was selected by the Cleveland Browns with the third overall pick in the 2005 NFL draft. He also played in the NFL for the New York Jets, San Francisco 49ers, and Seattle Seahawks.

== Early life ==
Edwards was born in Detroit, Michigan. During his three active high school years at Bishop Gallagher High School, Edwards played a variety of positions for his high school football team, and made 63 receptions for 740 yards and eight touchdowns.

== College career ==
Edwards attended the University of Michigan, following in his father Stan Edwards's footsteps, where he played for coach Lloyd Carr's Michigan Wolverines football team from 2001 to 2004. During his senior season in 2004, he set Michigan season records for receptions (97) and receiving yards (1,330), and career records with 252 receptions, 3,541 yards, and 39 touchdowns, a Big Ten record. Edwards also set the Michigan career record for the most games with 100 or more receiving yards (17). During the 2013 Buffalo Wild Wings Bowl, Jeremy Gallon eclipsed Edwards' school single-season receiving yardage record with a total of 1373.

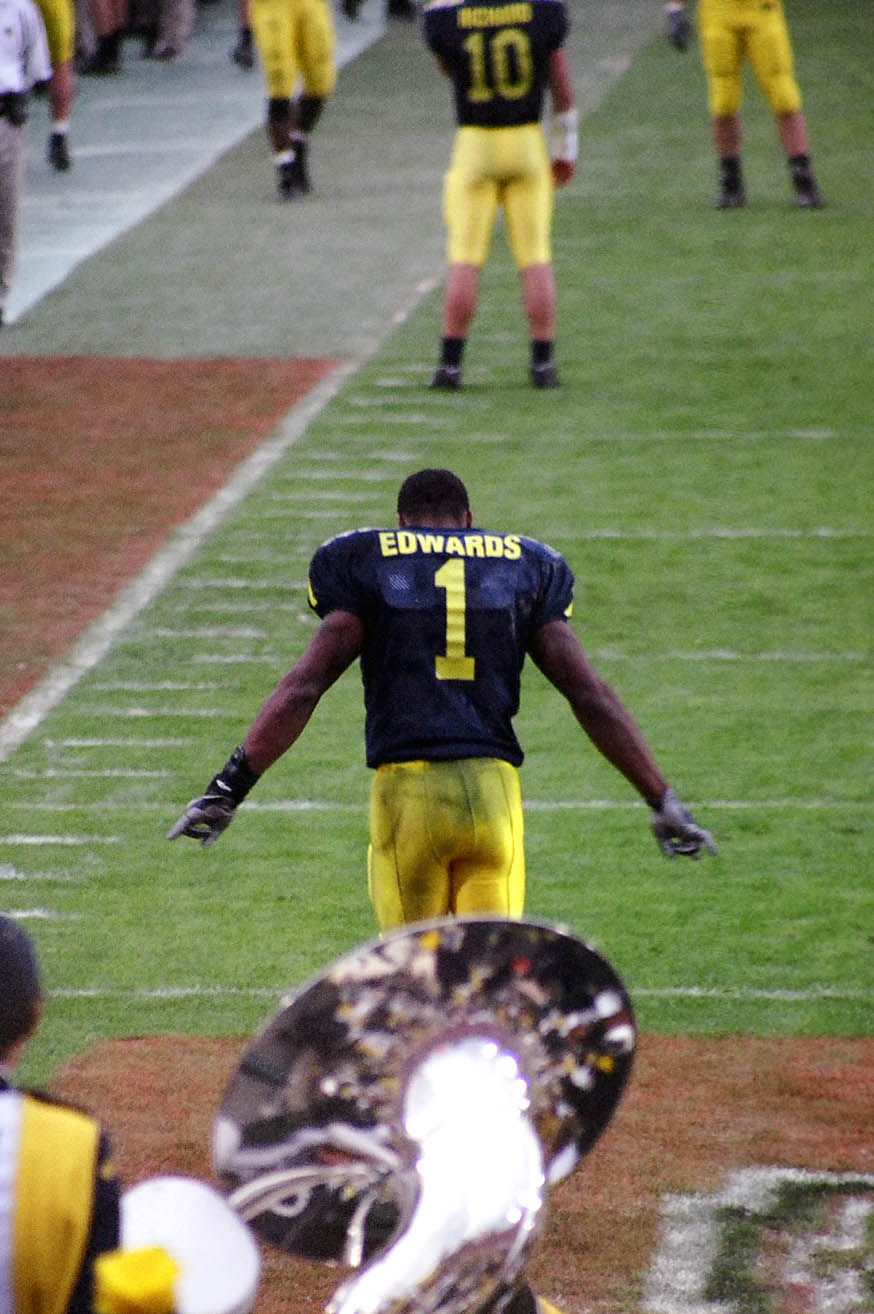
Edwards at 2005 Rose Bowl

Following his senior season, he won the Fred Biletnikoff Award given to the nation's top receiver, was awarded the Chicago Tribune Silver Football as the Big Ten Conference's most valuable player, and was recognized as a unanimous first-team All-American.

Edwards is the only wide receiver in Big Ten history and the third in NCAA Division I-A annals to gain 1,000 or more receiving yards in three consecutive years. Edwards concluded his college career by recording three touchdown catches in the 2005 Rose Bowl against the Texas Longhorns, tying the Rose Bowl record. Edwards also fell just short of eclipsing Jack Clancy's 10-game single-season records of 76 receptions and 1,077 yards by recording 76 and 1,049 in his first 10 in 2004.

=== Track and field ===
Braylon Edwards also ran track and field at Michigan. His indoor 200 meter time of 21.81 seconds was the third fastest in school history at that time. Edwards also ran the 60-meter dash and the 100-meter dash. He placed third in the high jump at the 2003 Meyo Invitational, with a personal-best leap of 2.11 meters.

Personal bests

Event	Time (seconds)	Venue	Date
60 meters	6.88	University Park, Michigan	February 14, 2003
100 meters	10.80	West Lafayette, Indiana	May 15, 2004
200 meters	21.81	Ypsilanti, Michigan	January 31, 2004

== Professional career ==
Pre-draft measurables
Height	Weight	Arm length	Hand span	40-yard dash	20-yard shuttle	Three-cone drill	Vertical jump	Bench press
6 ft 2 7/8 in (1.90 m)	211 lb (96 kg)	33 1/8 in (0.84 m)	9 7/8 in (0.25 m)	4.45 s	4.02 s	6.83 s	38 in (0.97 m)	22 reps
All values from NFL Combine/Michigan Pro Day

=== Cleveland Browns ===
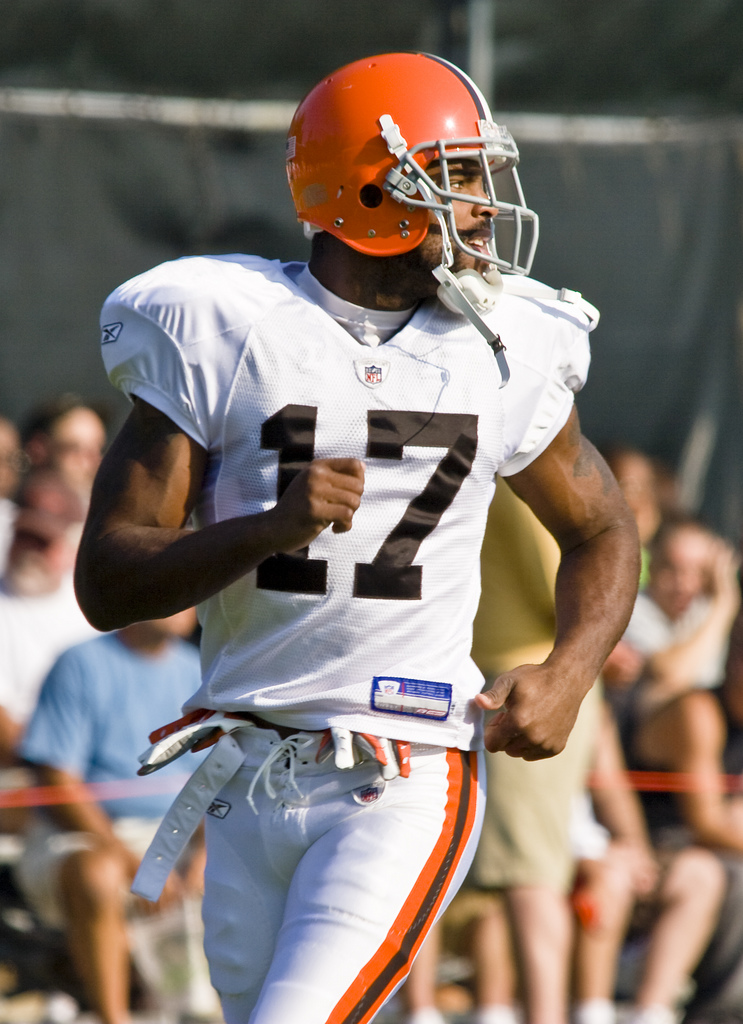
Edwards in Browns 2008 training camp.

Edwards was selected in the first round (third overall) in the 2005 NFL draft by the Cleveland Browns.

Edwards began his rookie season as Cleveland's third wide receiver—a holdout caused him to miss the beginning of training camp. Early in the season, Edwards revealed that he had a staph infection and missed a few weeks as a result. He moved into the starting lineup by midseason. He made his NFL debut versus the Cincinnati Bengals on September 11 and caught his first NFL touchdown at the Green Bay Packers on September 18. He amassed 512 receiving yards and three touchdowns before suffering a season-ending knee injury. Edwards had surgery in the offseason, and, while rehabilitating, bonded with Kellen Winslow II. Both were determined to make a full and speedy recovery.

Edwards, like Winslow, had a successful rehabilitation, enabling him to be ready to play in the team's opening game in 2006. Edwards became the top receiver for the Browns after an injury to Joe Jurevicius that season. Edwards totaled 61 receptions for 884 yards and six touchdowns on the season. At the end of the season, Edwards announced he would donate $500,000 to the University of Michigan to establish a scholarship endowment for football players. Edwards also had an altercation with Charlie Frye on the sidelines of a game in 2006. He said, "And they're talking about video games." Edwards continued to make headlines that season when he called out Mike Minter, Chris Gamble, Ricky Manning, and other defensive backs of the Carolina Panthers. Additionally, he attended the annual Michigan-Ohio State rivalry game despite being advised by several veteran captains not to go. Edwards was late getting back from Columbus and was late to a team meeting.

Edwards had a breakout season in 2007 and made his first Pro Bowl, becoming the first Browns receiver to make the Pro Bowl since Webster Slaughter in 1989. Edwards broke franchise records for receiving yardage with 1,289 receiving yards compared to Slaughter's record of 1,236 in 1989 and receiving touchdowns with 16 compared to Gary Collins's 13 in 1963. Edwards' 16 touchdowns were also second in the league behind only Randy Moss, who set an NFL record with 23 touchdowns.

Edwards publicly made a bet with Michael Phelps that he would catch 17 touchdowns in 2008. However, Edwards and the Browns struggled during the entire year. The Browns finished at 4–12, and Braylon led the NFL in dropped passes with 23. He caught only three touchdown passes.

=== New York Jets (first stint) ===
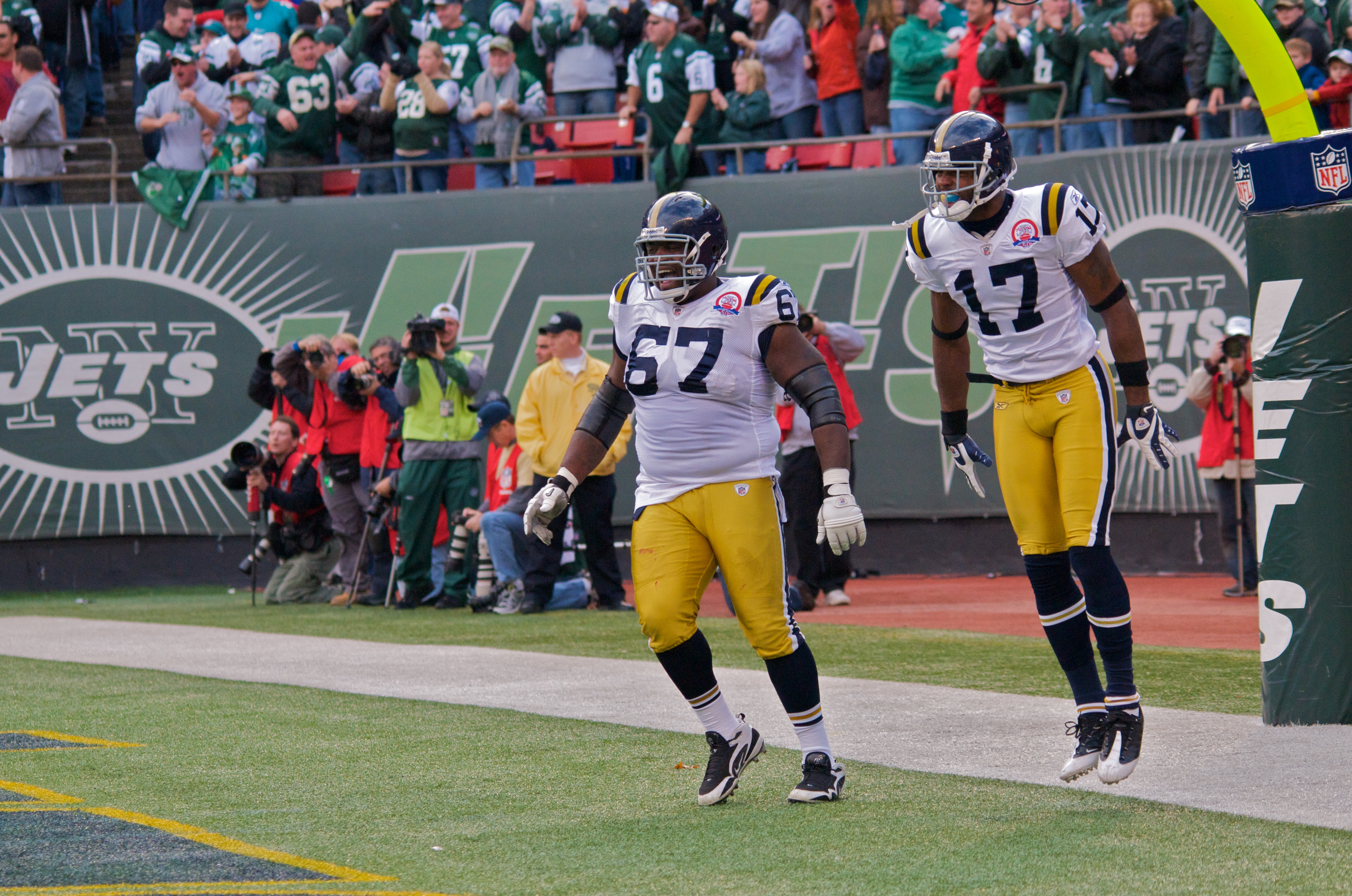
Edwards celebrating a touchdown with teammate Damien Woody

On October 7, 2009, Edwards was traded to the New York Jets for wide receiver Chansi Stuckey, linebacker Jason Trusnik, and a third and fifth round draft pick in the 2010 NFL draft. Edwards cited a need for a "fresh start" following the deal's completion. In 12 games for New York, Braylon had 35 catches for 541 yards and four touchdowns. Braylon had his first taste of the postseason in the 2009–10 NFL playoffs. In the Jets' first two games, Braylon only had four catches for 56 yards, but in the AFC Championship against the Indianapolis Colts, Braylon caught an 80-yard touchdown pass to give the Jets their first points of the game. He finished the game with two catches for 100 yards and a touchdown as the Jets lost 30–17.

Edwards remained with the New York Jets in 2010, catching 53 passes for 904 yards and seven touchdowns.

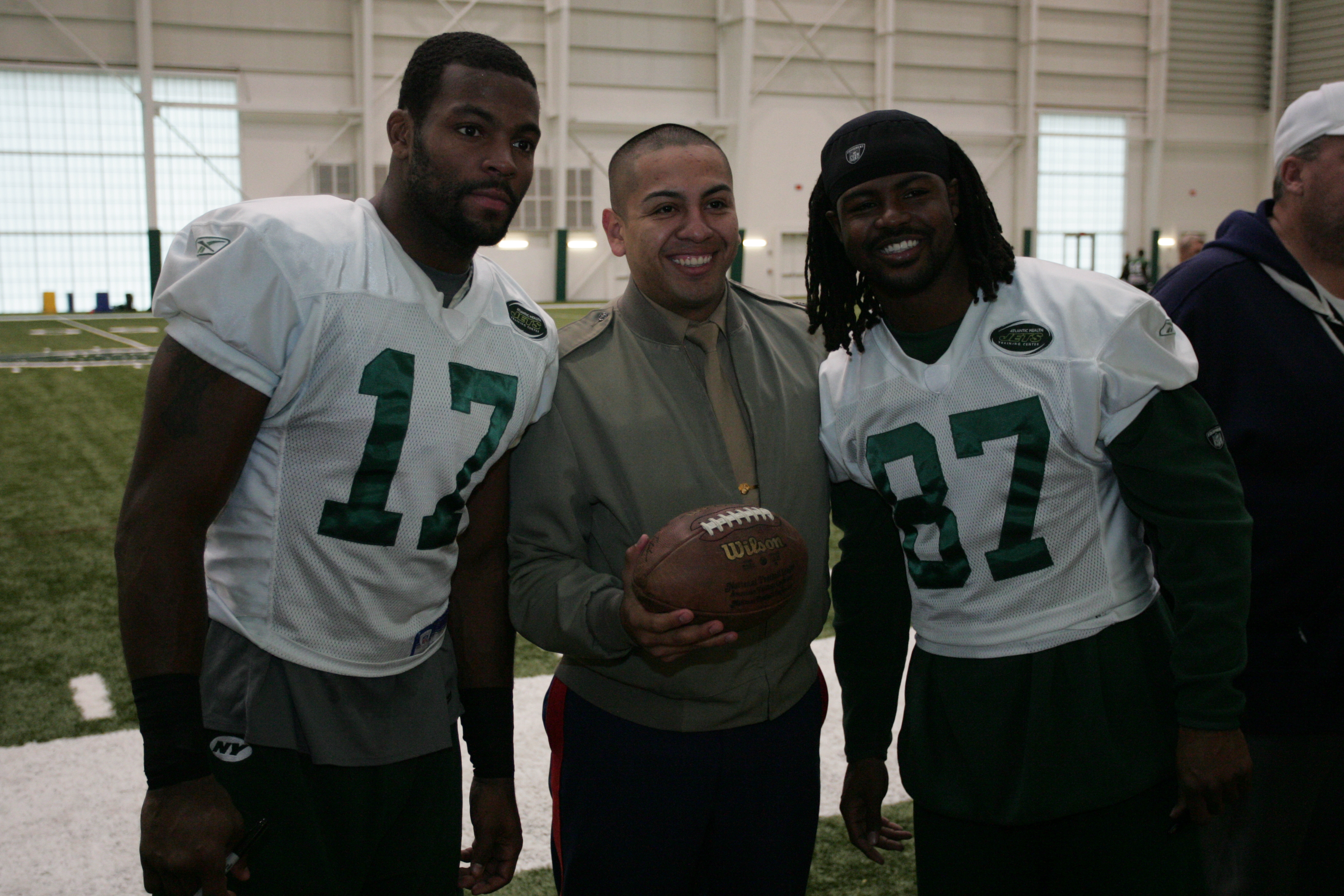
Edwards visiting Marines in 2009.

=== San Francisco 49ers ===
On August 4, 2011, Edwards signed a one-year, $1 million contract with the San Francisco 49ers. The contract would have increased to $3.5 million had Edwards recorded a 90-yard catch or a Pro Bowl season. He started five games and was waived by the 49ers on December 27 without having achieved either incentive.

=== Seattle Seahawks ===
On July 31, 2012, Edwards signed a one-year contract with the Seattle Seahawks. On December 4, he was waived by the Seahawks.

=== New York Jets (second stint) ===
Edwards was claimed off waivers by the Jets on December 11, 2012.

On July 25, 2013, Edwards re-signed with the Jets on a one-year contract with the Jets. He was waived by New York as a part of the team's final roster cuts on August 26.

== Career statistics ==
=== NFL ===
Year	Team	Games		Receiving					Rushing					Fumbles	
Year	Team	GP	GS	Rec	Yds	Avg	Lng	TD	Att	Yds	Avg	Lng	TD	Fum	Lost
2005	CLE	10	7	32	512	16.0	80T	3	—	—	—	—	—	0	0
2006	CLE	16	15	61	884	14.5	75	6	3	7	2.3	8	0	0	0
2007	CLE	16	16	80	1,289	16.1	78T	16	—	—	—	—	—	3	2
2008	CLE	16	16	55	873	15.9	70	3	—	—	—	—	—	0	0
2009	CLE	4	4	10	139	13.9	24	0	—	—	—	—	—	0	0
2009	NYJ	12	11	35	541	15.5	65T	4	—	—	—	—	—	1	1
2010	NYJ	16	15	53	904	17.1	74T	7	1	4	4.0	4	0	1	1
2011	SF	9	5	15	181	12.1	24	0	—	—	—	—	—	0	0
2012	SEA	10	1	8	74	9.3	16	1	—	—	—	—	—	0	0
2012	NYJ	3	3	10	125	12.5	19	0	—	—	—	—	—	0	0
Total		112	93	359	5,522	15.4	80	40	4	11	2.8	8	0	5	4

=== College ===
Season	Team	GP	Receiving			
Season	Team	GP	Rec	Yds	Avg	TD
2001	Michigan	6	3	38	12.7	0
2002	Michigan	13	67	1,035	15.4	10
2003	Michigan	13	85	1,138	13.4	14
2004	Michigan	12	97	1,330	13.7	15
Totals		44	252	3,541	14.1	39

== Legal issues ==
Edwards was stopped at least seven times from 2002 to 2010 for speeding violations, the most recent of which was in October 2008 when he was pulled over for driving 120 mph in a 65 mph zone.

Two days before being traded to the New York Jets, on October 5, 2009, Edwards reportedly punched Edward Givens, a local party promoter, in the face at 2:30 A.M. outside of the View Ultralounge & Nightclub. Givens, who is an acquaintance of LeBron James, alleged that Edwards was jealous of James' success thus prompting Edwards' attack. This prompted James to call the incident "childish." On October 26, 2009, Edwards was charged with misdemeanor assault and later pleaded no contest to the charge of aggravated assault on January 12, 2010. Edwards was given a suspended 180-day jail sentence, was fined $1,000 and placed on inactive probation. Though Edwards offered no explanation or apology for his actions, he reportedly regretted the entire ordeal according to his lawyer. The NFL did not suspend Edwards for his actions.

On September 21, 2010, Edwards was arrested on a drunken driving charge in New York early in the morning. He was originally pulled over for having excessively tinted windows on his Range Rover. Police smelled alcohol on Edwards who blew 0.16—twice the legal limit. He was arrested on a DUI charge.

In October 2013, Braylon was accused of physically assaulting a man who had taken a video of Edwards fighting in the street earlier in the evening with an unknown man. The photographer said he was approached by Edwards who demanded the video be deleted and when the photographer refused and started to walk away, Braylon grabbed the photographers ankles from behind and lifted them up, causing the photographer's face to strike the pavement and then followed up by slamming him into the side of a car on the street. When approached by the media Braylon Edwards' representatives denied the incident, claiming the story was concocted in a shameless attempt to "take Braylon's money." The next day, TMZ presented video footage showing the incident taking place as the victim had described.

On March 4, 2024, Edwards was called a hero by the Farmington Hills Police. Edwards came to the aid of an 80-year-old man, saving the victim's life following an attempted murder and assault in a YMCA locker room.

== Philanthropy ==
In 2007, Edwards pledged to 100 Cleveland high school students that, if they maintained grade point averages at 2.5 or higher and performed 15 hours of community service, he would pay for their college tuition, an offer valued at $1 million. On May 25, 2011, it was widely reported that Edwards announced he was keeping his pledge. Sporting News website quoted Edwards as saying:

As the 2nd most hated man in Clev & a man of my word, today I will honor a promise made to 100 students in Cleveland years ago," Edwards tweeted. "The last of my Advance 100 students will graduate from my program and head off to college on scholarships that I will provide them with. Guys, enjoy and embrace your new beginnings and remember your promise to me, to reach back & help someone else along the way.

The scholarships are worth $10,000 each and fulfill a promise Edwards made to 100 eighth-graders in the Cleveland area in 2007 as long as they continued to meet the academic and community service requirements. According to published reports, Edwards actually selected 101 students. In an interview Edwards said: 101 Scholarships at $10,000 each is $1.01M.

This was not a tax write-off. This was something we wanted to do the right way and something I was going to be a part of until the end. I know that some of these kids could have easily steered off the right path or maybe wouldn't have been able to go to college at all without this, and I just hope someday they pay it forward.

The pledge was through a program called the "ADVANCE 100 Program", an educational initiative established by the Braylon Edwards Foundation in May 2007.

== Personal life ==
Edwards started working for the Big Ten Network as a television analyst in the summer of 2017. On September 3, 2018, he was suspended for comments in violation of media guidelines after he tweeted "Ruiz is weak, line is weak, Shea is scared, fucking Michigan offense is so predictable. Michigan football is sadly one thing……Trash." Edwards had a longstanding feud with Michigan coach Jim Harbaugh, which intensified after the Notre Dame game at the beginning of the 2018 season. Edwards currently works at the Woodward Sports Network.

After his accomplished career in high school and collegiate football in the state of Michigan, Edwards was enshrined into the Michigan Sports Hall of Fame on October 17, 2024.

== See also ==
- Lists of Michigan Wolverines football receiving leaders
