= Josh Cribbs =

American football player (born 1983)

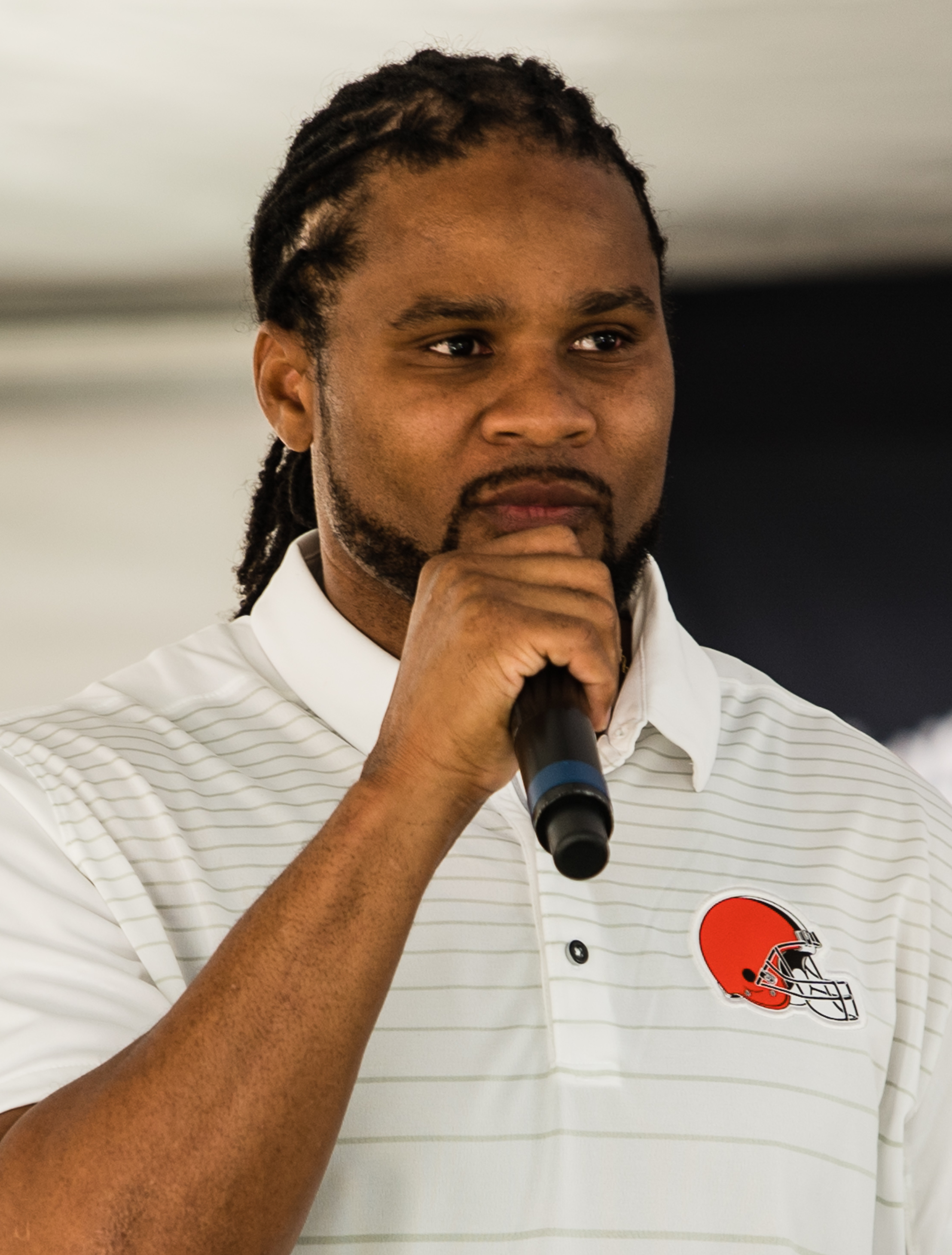
- Cribbs in 2019

No. 16
- Positions: Wide receiver, return specialist

Personal information
- Born: June 9, 1983 (age 43); Washington, D.C., U.S.
- Listed height: 6 ft 1 in (1.85 m)
- Listed weight: 192 lb (87 kg)

Career information
- High school: Dunbar (Washington, D.C.)
- College: Kent State (2001–2004)
- NFL draft: 2005: undrafted

Career history
- Cleveland Browns (2005–2012); Oakland Raiders (2013)*; New York Jets (2013); Indianapolis Colts (2014)
- * Offseason or practice squad member only

Awards and highlights
- First-team All-Pro (2009); Second-team All-Pro (2007); 3× Pro Bowl (2007, 2009, 2012); NFL kickoff return yards leader (2007); NFL 2000s All-Decade Team; Cleveland Browns Legends; Kent State Golden Flashes No. 9 retired

Career NFL statistics
- Receptions: 110
- Receiving yards: 1,175
- Receiving touchdowns: 7
- Rushing yards: 808
- Rushing touchdowns: 2
- Return yards: 13,488
- Return touchdowns: 11
- Stats at Pro Football Reference

Joshua Cribbs (born June 9, 1983) is an American former professional football player who was a wide receiver and return specialist in the National Football League (NFL). He played college football for the Kent State Golden Flashes and was signed by the Cleveland Browns as an undrafted free agent after the 2005 NFL draft. Cribbs is tied for the second-most NFL career record with eight kickoff returns for touchdowns, and also the NFL record with two kickoffs of 100 yards or more returned for touchdowns in a single game. He has also played for the New York Jets, the Oakland Raiders and the Indianapolis Colts. He was most recently a special teams coaching intern for the Cleveland Browns.

== Early life ==
Cribbs played quarterback at Dunbar High School in Washington, D.C. As a senior in the 2000 season, he was named a first-team All-Met selection by the Washington Post. While attending, he was teammates with future San Francisco 49ers tight end Vernon Davis. Cribbs played and lettered in baseball, swimming, and basketball in addition to football.

During Cribbs' time at Dunbar, the Crimson Tide won three consecutive DCIAA football titles. In his senior season, Cribbs completed 130-of-277 passes for 2,022 yards, nine touchdowns and five interceptions. In the 2000 Turkey Bowl (DCIAA Championship game played the morning of Thanksgiving), he led Dunbar to a 35–12 victory over the Ballou Knights. Two second-half touchdowns thrown by Cribbs were key to the Crimson Tide's victory over Ballou—one of which was caught by then-Dunbar sophomore tight end Vernon Davis.

== College career ==
Cribbs attended Kent State University, where he played quarterback for the Kent State Golden Flashes football team. He is the all-time total offense leader with 10,839 yards. Other school records include rushing touchdowns (38), pass completions (616), pass attempts (1,123), passing yardage (7,169), touchdowns scored (41), and points scored (246).

He is one of only two true freshmen in National Collegiate Athletic Association (NCAA) history to both rush and pass for 1,000 yards (the other being Armanti Edwards of Appalachian State). He is also one of only eight players in NCAA history to both rush and pass for 1,000 yards in at least two different seasons, the others being Beau Morgan of Air Force, Vince Young of Texas, Pat White of West Virginia, Edwards of Appalachian State, Jordan Lynch of Northern Illinois Huskies football, Denard Robinson of Michigan and Brad Smith of Missouri. Cribbs accomplished the feat two times. He is one of only four quarterbacks in NCAA history to rush for 3,500 yards and throw for 7,000 yards in his career (the other three being Antwaan Randle El of Indiana, Edwards of Appalachian State, and Brad Smith of Missouri.

Cribbs is also the only player in NCAA history to lead his team in both rushing and passing in four different seasons, although his 2003 single-season school record of 3,125 combined yards was eclipsed in 2008 by quarterback Julian Edelman.

Cribbs was a communication studies major with a concentration in public communication. He received his diploma on May 15, 2010.

== Professional career ==
=== Cleveland Browns ===
==== 2005 season ====
Cribbs was not chosen in the 2005 NFL draft; however, he was signed as an undrafted free agent by the Cleveland Browns on April 29, 2005. He made the Browns roster for the 2005 season and made an impact as a kick returner. He averaged 24.5 yards per return, and his total of 1,094 return yards set a franchise record. He made his NFL debut versus the Cincinnati Bengals on September 11. In a game against the Detroit Lions, he returned a kick 90 yards for his first NFL touchdown.

==== 2006 season ====
In 2006, Cribbs signed a six-year contract extension with the Browns. That year, he set a new franchise record for most kickoff yardage in a season, breaking the record he had set the year prior.

==== 2007 season ====
After returning yet another kickoff for a touchdown against the Oakland Raiders in Week 3 of the 2007 season, Cribbs had one kick-return touchdown in each of his first three years in the NFL. Cribbs recorded his fourth kickoff-return touchdown with a 100-yard return against the Steelers in Week 10 of the 2007 season, as well as a 90-yard return earlier in the game. Cribbs continued his season with 245 return yards and 61 punt return yards in the Browns overtime victory over the Ravens in week 11. Cribbs was voted to the 2008 Pro Bowl as a kick returner for the AFC. Cribbs also had a 76-yard punt return for a touchdown against the 49ers. Cribbs had another return for 94 yards for another score but was called back on a holding penalty.

==== 2008 season ====
For the fourth straight season, Cribbs again had a touchdown on a kickoff return, scoring on a 92-yard return versus the Baltimore Ravens in Week 9. It was the fifth kickoff return touchdown of Cribbs's career. Cribbs also had a four-yard rushing touchdown against the Buffalo Bills. On November 26, 2008, after placing Brady Quinn on injured reserve, the Browns named Cribbs their emergency quarterback.

==== 2009 season ====
On September 13, in the Browns' home opener versus the Minnesota Vikings, Cribbs returned a punt 67 yards for a touchdown, tying the team record for career returns for a touchdown (seven) with Eric Metcalf. Also, in that same game, Cribbs was named as a starting wide receiver for the first time in his NFL career. On October 18, Cribbs returned a Pittsburgh kickoff for a touchdown, breaking the team record for returns for a touchdown. In this game, he became the first NFL player to throw an interception and record a kick-off return touchdown in the same game since 1950. On December 10, Cribbs led the Browns to victory over the Pittsburgh Steelers, their first win over their rival in 13 games. Cribbs led all offensive players with 200 all-purpose yards, including 87 yards rushing out of the Wildcat formation. On December 20, Cribbs returned two kickoffs for touchdowns against the Kansas City Chiefs to set and extend the all-time NFL record for most kickoff returns for touchdowns in a career. On December 29, Cribbs was named to the 2010 Pro Bowl for the second time in his career as the Browns' and AFC's representative as the kick returner. Cribbs was also named the Browns' team MVP for the 2009 season.

==== 2010 season ====
Relations between Cribbs and the Browns soured at the end of the 2009 season, as negotiations on a new contract extension ended with a reported $1.4 million per year offer that Cribbs felt was insultingly low. On January 7, 2010, Cribbs cleaned out his locker at the Browns' training complex and announced his intention to walk out on the final three years of his contract, telling reporters, "... it absolutely felt like the last time I'd be setting foot inside the building. I feel like it's over for me in Cleveland", adding that the Browns' offer felt "like I've been betrayed and stabbed in the back."

On March 5, 2010, Cribbs re-signed with the Cleveland Browns with a three-year, $20 million contract.

In January 2010, Cribbs was named to the NFL's All-Decade Team for the 2000s. He was ranked 84th by his fellow players on the NFL Top 100 Players of 2011.

==== 2011 season ====
In 2011, Cribbs set a career-high of 41 receptions, 518 yards and four touchdowns. He also had an 84-yard punt return for a touchdown.

The 2011 season also marked the year of the NFL's rule change on kickoffs, shifting the position from the kicking team's 30-yard line to the 35. The move intended to prevent more returns due to the violent collisions that they sometimes yielded. Cribbs saw his return numbers dwindle somewhat from the rule change, and the market value for specialized return men has dwindled as well.

==== 2012 season ====
Cribbs had a rebound season with 1,136 kick return yards and 450 punt return yards with just three lost fumbles. He averaged 27.4 yards per return, good for fourth in the NFL.

On October 7, during a Week 5 game against the New York Giants, during which Cribbs returned 6 kickoffs for 221 yards, including a 74-yard return; he also returned one punt for just 12 yards. The Browns would lose to the Giants, 41–27. Later that season, he was knocked out of a game against the Baltimore Ravens after taking a hard shot from Ravens defender Dannell Ellerbe during a punt return and sustaining a concussion. He missed a few games and returned later in the season.

Cribbs was told he would not be re-signed on March 12, 2013. He took to an emotional response and posted a farewell message to Browns fans via Instagram.

=== Oakland Raiders ===
Cribbs signed with the Oakland Raiders on May 15, 2013. After a poor preseason, Cribbs was subsequently released by the team on August 25.

=== New York Jets ===
Cribbs was signed by the New York Jets on October 15, 2013. Cribbs suffered a shoulder injury in a Week 13 game against the Miami Dolphins and was placed on injured reserve on December 3.

=== Indianapolis Colts ===
Cribbs was signed by the Indianapolis Colts on November 17, 2014. In six games, he recorded one reception for eight yards, as well as 19 kickoff returns for 608 yards and 19 punt returns for 125 yards.

On May 1, 2015, the Colts released Cribbs.

=== Retirement ===
On March 22, 2017, Cribbs announced his retirement from professional football as a Cleveland Brown.

== Career statistics ==
=== NFL ===
Legend
| | Led the league |
| **Bold** | Career high |

| Year | Team | Games | | Receiving | | | | | Rushing | | | | | Kickoff returns | | | | | Punt returns | | | | | Fumbles | |
| Year | Team | GP | GS | Rec | Yds | Avg | Lng | TD | Att | Yds | Avg | Lng | TD | Ret | Yds | Avg | Lng | TD | Ret | Yds | Avg | Lng | TD | Fum | Lost |
|---|---|---|---|---|---|---|---|---|---|---|---|---|---|---|---|---|---|---|---|---|---|---|---|---|---|
| 2005 | CLE | 14 | 0 | 1 | 7 | 7.0 | 7 | 0 | 0 | 0 | 0 | 0 | 0 | 45 | 1,094 | 24.3 | 90 | 1 | 1 | 5 | 5.0 | 5 | 0 | 4 | 0 |
| 2006 | CLE | **16** | 1 | 10 | 91 | 9.1 | 14 | 0 | 1 | 0 | 0.0 | 0 | 0 | **61** | 1,494 | 24.5 | 92 | 1 | 6 | 51 | 8.5 | 34 | 0 | 3 | 2 |
| 2007 | CLE | **16** | 2 | 3 | 37 | 12.3 | 18 | 0 | 9 | 61 | 6.8 | 18 | 0 | 59 | **1,809** | 30.7 | 100 | 2 | 30 | 405 | **13.5** | 76 | **1** | 5 | 1 |
| 2008 | CLE | 15 | 2 | 2 | 18 | 9.0 | 17 | 1 | 29 | 167 | 5.8 | 27 | **1** | 44 | 1,110 | 25.2 | 92 | 1 | 28 | 228 | 8.1 | 32 | 0 | 0 | 0 |
| 2009 | CLE | **16** | **12** | 20 | 135 | 6.8 | 35 | 1 | **55** | **381** | 6.9 | **37** | **1** | 56 | 1,542 | 27.5 | **103** | **3** | **38** | 452 | 11.9 | 67 | **1** | 6 | 2 |
| 2010 | CLE | 15 | 5 | 23 | 292 | **12.7** | **65** | 1 | 20 | 66 | 3.3 | 19 | 0 | 40 | 814 | 20.4 | 37 | 0 | 20 | 168 | 8.4 | 17 | 0 | **7** | 0 |
| 2011 | CLE | **16** | 7 | **41** | **518** | 12.6 | 45 | **4** | 7 | 25 | 3.6 | 15 | 0 | 39 | 974 | 25.0 | 63 | 0 | 34 | 388 | 11.4 | **84** | **1** | 3 | 1 |
| 2012 | CLE | **16** | 2 | 7 | 63 | 9.0 | 24 | 0 | 6 | 42 | **7.0** | 16 | 0 | 43 | 1,178 | 27.4 | 74 | 0 | **38** | **457** | 12.0 | 60 | 0 | 6 | **3** |
| 2013 | NYJ | 6 | 0 | 2 | 6 | 3.0 | 5 | 0 | 13 | 55 | 4.2 | 9 | 0 | 20 | 490 | 24.5 | 42 | 0 | 8 | 96 | 12.0 | 21 | 0 | 0 | 0 |
| 2014 | IND | 6 | 0 | 1 | 8 | 8.0 | 8 | 0 | 0 | 0.0 | 0 | 0 | 0 | 19 | 608 | **32.0** | 76 | 0 | 19 | 125 | 6.6 | 18 | 0 | 2 | 0 |
| Career | | 136 | 31 | 110 | 1,175 | 10.7 | 65 | 7 | 140 | 797 | 5.7 | 37 | 2 | 426 | 11,113 | 26.1 | 103 | 8 | 222 | 2,375 | 10.7 | 84 | 3 | 36 | 9 |

=== College ===
| Season | Team | GP | Passing | | | | | | | | Rushing | | | |
| Season | Team | GP | Cmp | Att | Pct | Yds | Avg | TD | Int | Rtg | Att | Yds | Avg | TD |
|---|---|---|---|---|---|---|---|---|---|---|---|---|---|---|
| 2001 | Kent State | 11 | 131 | 238 | 55.0 | 1,516 | 6.4 | 10 | 5 | 118.2 | 164 | 1,019 | 6.2 | 5 |
| 2002 | Kent State | 10 | 91 | 186 | 48.9 | 1,014 | 5.5 | 4 | 14 | 86.8 | 137 | 1,057 | 7.7 | 10 |
| 2003 | Kent State | 12 | 178 | 364 | 48.9 | 2,424 | 6.7 | 14 | 9 | 112.6 | 161 | 701 | 4.4 | 14 |
| 2004 | Kent State | 10 | 216 | 335 | 64.5 | 2,215 | 6.6 | 17 | 6 | 133.2 | 170 | 893 | 5.3 | 9 |
| Career | | 43 | 616 | 1,123 | 54.9 | 7,169 | 6.4 | 45 | 34 | 115.6 | 632 | 3,670 | 5.8 | 38 |

== Career highlights ==
=== Awards and honors ===
NFL

- First-team All-Pro (2009)
- Second-team All-Pro (2007)
- 3× Pro Bowl (2007, 2009, 2012)
- NFL kickoff return yards leader (2007)
- NFL 2000s All-Decade Team
- Cleveland Browns Legends
- Ranked No. 84 in the Top 100 Players of 2011

College

- Kent State Golden Flashes No. 9 retired

=== Records ===
==== NFL records ====
- Two kickoff return touchdowns of 100 yards or more in a single game (tied with Ted Ginn Jr.)
- Most kickoff return touchdowns in a single game: 2 (tied with 9 others)

==== Browns franchise records ====
- Most career kickoff return yards: 10,015
- Most career combined kickoff and punt return yards: 12,169
- Most career all-purpose yards: 14,065
- Most kickoff return yards in a single season: 1,809 (2007)
- Most kickoff return touchdowns in a single season: 3 (2009)
- Most all-purpose yards in a single season: 2,510 (2009)
- Most career combined kickoff and punt return touchdowns: 11

== Personal life ==
Cribbs has been married to Maria Cribbs since 2002. He has two children, Kimorah and Israel Cribbs. The Cribbs family lives in North Royalton, Ohio.

Cribbs is also part-owner of a children's indoor inflatable play arena called Bounce City. He shares the ownership of the facility, which is located in Strongsville, Ohio, with Darnell Dinkins, a former Browns tight end.

Cribbs indicated via Twitter that he will give his 2010 Pro Bowl paycheck to relief efforts for the 2010 Haiti earthquake.

Cribbs' uncle is former running back Joe Cribbs.

Cribbs was also featured in an episode of The League, "The White Knuckler", in which Ruxin (Nick Kroll) contacts Cribbs to help out a sick kid in the hope of meeting Cribbs himself.

Cribbs played himself in an episode of Hot in Cleveland, "The Gateway Friend," which originally aired May 2, 2012. He appeared in the bar/restaurant that Melanie, Joy, and Victoria frequent, placing second in a karaoke contest to guest star Kristin Chenoweth. He did not sing on camera but did have multiple lines.

Following the 2014 season, Cribbs appeared on an episode of ESPN's Outside the Lines, discussing concussions. Cribbs stated that a specialist at the Cleveland Clinic told the then 32-year-old Cribbs that he had the brain of a person in his late 50s. He stated that despite the diagnosis he would continue to play in the NFL if possible, comparing himself to a smoker with late-stage cancer who continued to smoke.

Cribbs and his wife have hosted a local television talk show titled Cribbs in the CLE on WOIO since 2019.
