= Eric Steinbach =

American football player (born 1980)

No. 65
- Position: Guard

Personal information
- Born: April 4, 1980 (age 46); Joliet, Illinois, U.S.
- Listed height: 6 ft 6 in (1.98 m)
- Listed weight: 295 lb (134 kg)

Career information
- High school: Providence (New Lenox, Illinois)
- College: Iowa (1998–2002)
- NFL draft: 2003: 2nd round, 33rd overall pick

Career history
- Cincinnati Bengals (2003−2006); Cleveland Browns (2007−2011); Miami Dolphins (2012)*
- * Offseason or practice squad member only

Awards and highlights
- Pro Bowl (2007); PFWA All-Rookie Team (2003); Consensus All-American (2002); Big Ten Offensive Lineman of the Year (2002); 2× First-team All-Big Ten (2001, 2002)

Career NFL statistics
- Games played: 125
- Games started: 124
- Fumble recoveries: 3
- Stats at Pro Football Reference

Eric Steinbach (born April 4, 1980) is an American former professional football player who was a guard for nine seasons in the National Football League (NFL). He played college football for the Iowa Hawkeyes, and earned consensus All-American honors. He was selected by the Cincinnati Bengals in the second round of the 2003 NFL draft. He played for the Bengals from 2003 to 2006 and the Cleveland Browns from 2007 to 2011.

== Early life ==
Steinbach was born in Joliet, Illinois. He attended Providence Catholic High School in New Lenox, and played for the Providence Catholic Celtics high school football team. He helped his team to a 50-game winning streak and four consecutive state championships. As a senior, he had 46 tackles, 55 assists, and a school record 26 quarterback sacks on his way to being named conference most valuable player and first-team all-state. One of the top high school players in the country, he was named Super Prep and PrepStar all-American.

== College career ==
While attending the University of Iowa, Steinbach played for coach Kirk Ferentz's Iowa Hawkeyes football team from 1999 to 2002. He received first-team All-Big Ten honors twice (2001, 2002), was the Big Ten Conference Offensive Lineman of the Year (2002), and was recognized as a consensus first-team All-American (2002). Steinbach majored in education.

== Professional career ==
Pre-draft measurables
Height	Weight	Arm length	Hand span	40-yard dash	10-yard split	20-yard split	20-yard shuttle	Three-cone drill	Vertical jump	Broad jump
6 ft 6 1/4 in (1.99 m)	297 lb (135 kg)	31 5/8 in (0.80 m)	9 5/8 in (0.24 m)	4.98 s	1.79 s	2.91 s	4.42 s	7.36 s	36 in (0.91 m)	9 ft 11 in (3.02 m)
All values from NFL Combine

=== Cincinnati Bengals ===
In the 2003 NFL draft, Steinbach was selected by the Cincinnati Bengals in the second round (33rd overall) and was immediately named a starter. Through the 2006 season, Steinbach has appeared in 63 regular-season games, 62 as a starter, missing only one game. Steinbach's relentless work-ethic makes him a standout at the guard position. Yahoo! Sports called him one of the Top 10 Free Agents to watch for a few months prior to the end of the 2006 season. The versatile and durable Steinbach was able to play at the guard, tackle, and center positions on the offensive line, and his speed and athleticism helped to make him one of the league's premier pulling lineman.

=== Cleveland Browns ===
On March 2, 2007, (the first day of the year's NFL free agency period) the Browns signed Steinbach to a seven-year, $49.5 million contract (of which $17 million was guaranteed), making him at the time one of the highest paid offensive lineman in the league. He had consistently been rated as a top five free agent (and widely considered number one among offensive lineman) following the 2006 season by every major sports authority.

On December 18, 2007, Steinbach was named as a first alternate for the 2008 Pro Bowl at offensive guard.

The Browns released Steinbach on March 14, 2012.

=== Miami Dolphins ===
Steinbach was signed by the Miami Dolphins on July 26, 2012. He retired from professional football on August 22, 2012.
