= Robaire Smith =

American football player (born 1977)

No. 98, 99, 96
- Position: Defensive end

Personal information
- Born: November 15, 1977 (age 48); Flint, Michigan, U.S.
- Listed height: 6 ft 5 in (1.96 m)
- Listed weight: 310 lb (141 kg)

Career information
- High school: Flint Northern
- College: Michigan State
- NFL draft: 2000: 6th round, 197th overall pick

Career history
- Tennessee Titans (2000–2003); Houston Texans (2004–2005); Tennessee Titans (2006); Cleveland Browns (2007–2010)

Awards and highlights
- First-team All-Big Ten (1999); Second-team All-Big Ten (1997)

Career NFL statistics
- Total tackles: 398
- Sacks: 21
- Forced fumbles: 1
- Fumble recoveries: 3
- Stats at Pro Football Reference

Robaire Fredrick Smith (born November 15, 1977) is an American former professional football player who was a defensive end in the National Football League (NFL). He played college football for the Michigan State Spartans.

== Early life and college ==
Smith was a Parade All-America selection as a senior at Flint Northern High School. He earned first-team all-state honors with 92 tackles, 11 sacks and caught 17 passes for 297 yards and six touchdowns. He then attended Michigan State University and ranks fifth on the Spartans' career list with 22 sacks and fourth in tackles for loss with 48. He finished his college career with 191 tackles, three interceptions, four forced fumbles and three fumble recoveries.

== Professional career ==
Smith was selected by the Tennessee Titans in the sixth round (197th overall) in the 2000 NFL draft. In his rookie year, he played in eight games, recording six tackles, 2.5 sacks and one pass defensed. In 2001, he played in ten games, registering 16 tackles and two sacks. Smith signed with the Houston Texans in 2004 as an unrestricted free agent. He was cut on September 3, 2006, and re-signed with the Titans on September 6, 2006. He signed a contract as a free agent with the Cleveland Browns on March 16, 2007.

== NFL career statistics ==
Legend
| **Bold** | Career high |

=== Regular season ===
| Year | Team | Games | | Tackles | | | | | Interceptions | | | | | Fumbles | | | |
| Year | Team | GP | GS | Cmb | Solo | Ast | Sck | TFL | Int | Yds | TD | Lng | PD | FF | FR | Yds | TD |
|---|---|---|---|---|---|---|---|---|---|---|---|---|---|---|---|---|---|
| 2000 | TEN | 7 | 0 | 6 | 5 | 1 | 2.5 | 2 | 0 | 0 | 0 | 0 | 1 | 0 | 0 | 0 | 0 |
| 2001 | TEN | 10 | 0 | 7 | 5 | 2 | 2.0 | 3 | 0 | 0 | 0 | 0 | 0 | 0 | 0 | 0 | 0 |
| 2002 | TEN | **16** | 2 | 34 | 25 | 9 | 2.5 | 6 | 0 | 0 | 0 | 0 | 1 | 0 | 0 | 0 | 0 |
| 2003 | TEN | **16** | 15 | 35 | 20 | 15 | **4.5** | 5 | 0 | 0 | 0 | 0 | 2 | **1** | **2** | **43** | 0 |
| 2004 | HOU | **16** | **16** | 52 | 32 | 20 | 2.0 | 6 | 0 | 0 | 0 | 0 | **9** | 0 | 0 | 0 | 0 |
| 2005 | HOU | **16** | **16** | **68** | **43** | **25** | 1.5 | **10** | 0 | 0 | 0 | 0 | 4 | 0 | 1 | 3 | 0 |
| 2006 | TEN | 15 | 12 | 48 | 32 | 16 | 0.5 | 3 | 0 | 0 | 0 | 0 | 2 | 0 | 0 | 0 | 0 |
| 2007 | CLE | **16** | **16** | 56 | 42 | 14 | 4.0 | 7 | 0 | 0 | 0 | 0 | 2 | 0 | 0 | 0 | 0 |
| 2008 | CLE | 2 | 2 | 5 | 5 | 0 | 0.0 | 0 | 0 | 0 | 0 | 0 | 0 | 0 | 0 | 0 | 0 |
| 2009 | CLE | 15 | 15 | 62 | **43** | 19 | 1.5 | 1 | 0 | 0 | 0 | 0 | 0 | 0 | 0 | 0 | 0 |
| 2010 | CLE | 5 | 5 | 25 | 13 | 12 | 0.0 | 1 | 0 | 0 | 0 | 0 | 0 | 0 | 0 | 0 | 0 |
| | | 134 | 99 | 398 | 265 | 133 | 21.0 | 44 | 0 | 0 | 0 | 0 | 21 | 1 | 3 | 46 | 0 |

=== Playoffs ===
| Year | Team | Games | | Tackles | | | | | Interceptions | | | | | Fumbles | | | |
| Year | Team | GP | GS | Cmb | Solo | Ast | Sck | TFL | Int | Yds | TD | Lng | PD | FF | FR | Yds | TD |
|---|---|---|---|---|---|---|---|---|---|---|---|---|---|---|---|---|---|
| 2002 | TEN | **2** | 0 | 2 | 1 | 1 | 0.0 | 0 | 0 | 0 | 0 | 0 | 0 | 0 | 0 | 0 | 0 |
| 2003 | TEN | **2** | **2** | **5** | **2** | **3** | 0.0 | 0 | 0 | 0 | 0 | 0 | **1** | 0 | 0 | 0 | 0 |
| | | 4 | 2 | 7 | 3 | 4 | 0.0 | 1 | 0 | 0 | 0 | 0 | 1 | 0 | 0 | 0 | 0 |

== Personal life ==
Smith married his long-time girlfriend Monek on March 13, 2007, in Jamaica. The two have four children together, including a set of identical twin boys. His brother, Fernando Smith, played 7 seasons in the NFL.
