= Chase Pittman =

American football player (born 1983)

No. 94, 97
- Position: Defensive end

Personal information
- Born: May 15, 1983 (age 43); Minden, Louisiana, U.S.
- Listed height: 6 ft 5 in (1.96 m)
- Listed weight: 300 lb (136 kg)

Career information
- High school: Evangel Christian Academy (Shreveport, Louisiana)
- College: Texas (2003); LSU (2004–2006)
- NFL draft: 2007: 7th round, 213th overall pick

Career history
- Cleveland Browns (2007–2008)

Benjamin Chase Pittman (born May 15, 1983) is an American former football defensive end. He was drafted by the Cleveland Browns in the seventh round of the 2007 NFL draft. He played college football at Louisiana State University and Texas.

== Early life ==
A native of Minden, Louisiana in Webster Parish, Pittman attended Evangel Christian Academy, where as a senior made sixty-three tackles and six sacks.

== College career ==
Pittman played college football for the LSU Tigers. He played in 25 games and made 61 tackles and 8.5 sacks. He had originally attended the University of Texas at Austin before transferring to LSU in 2004. He majored in general studies.

== Professional career ==
Pittman was selected by the Cleveland Browns in the seventh round (213th overall) in the 2007 NFL draft. He was waived/injured on August 30, 2008.

== Personal life ==
Three weeks after Pittman committed to Texas, his brother Cole Pittman, who also was a defensive end for the Longhorns, died in an early morning one-car accident near Franklin, Texas, on February 26, 2001, while he was on his way to a spring practice in Austin, Texas.

In July 2005, Pittman was arrested on second-degree battery charges after allegedly punching a man in the face at a bar near LSU which led to his suspension from the team. He was released on bond on July 7.
