= Funtaine Hunter =

American gridiron football player (born 1983)

No. 34
- Position: Defensive lineman

Personal information
- Born: December 27, 1983 (age 42); Valdosta, Georgia, U.S.
- Listed height: 6 ft 3 in (1.91 m)
- Listed weight: 238 lb (108 kg)

Career information
- College: Vanderbilt
- NFL draft: 2007: undrafted

Career history
- 2008: Calgary Stampeders

Awards and highlights
- Grey Cup champion (2008)
- Stats at CFL.ca

Funtaine Hunter (born December 27, 1983) is an American former professional football linebacker.

Hunter played college football for the Vanderbilt Commodores football team and signed as an undrafted free agent with the Cleveland Browns in May 2007 but waived days later. He signed on to the Calgary Stampeders practice roster for the 2008 CFL season and played three games for the Stampeders that year before being released.
