= Ryan Pontbriand =

American football player (born 1979)

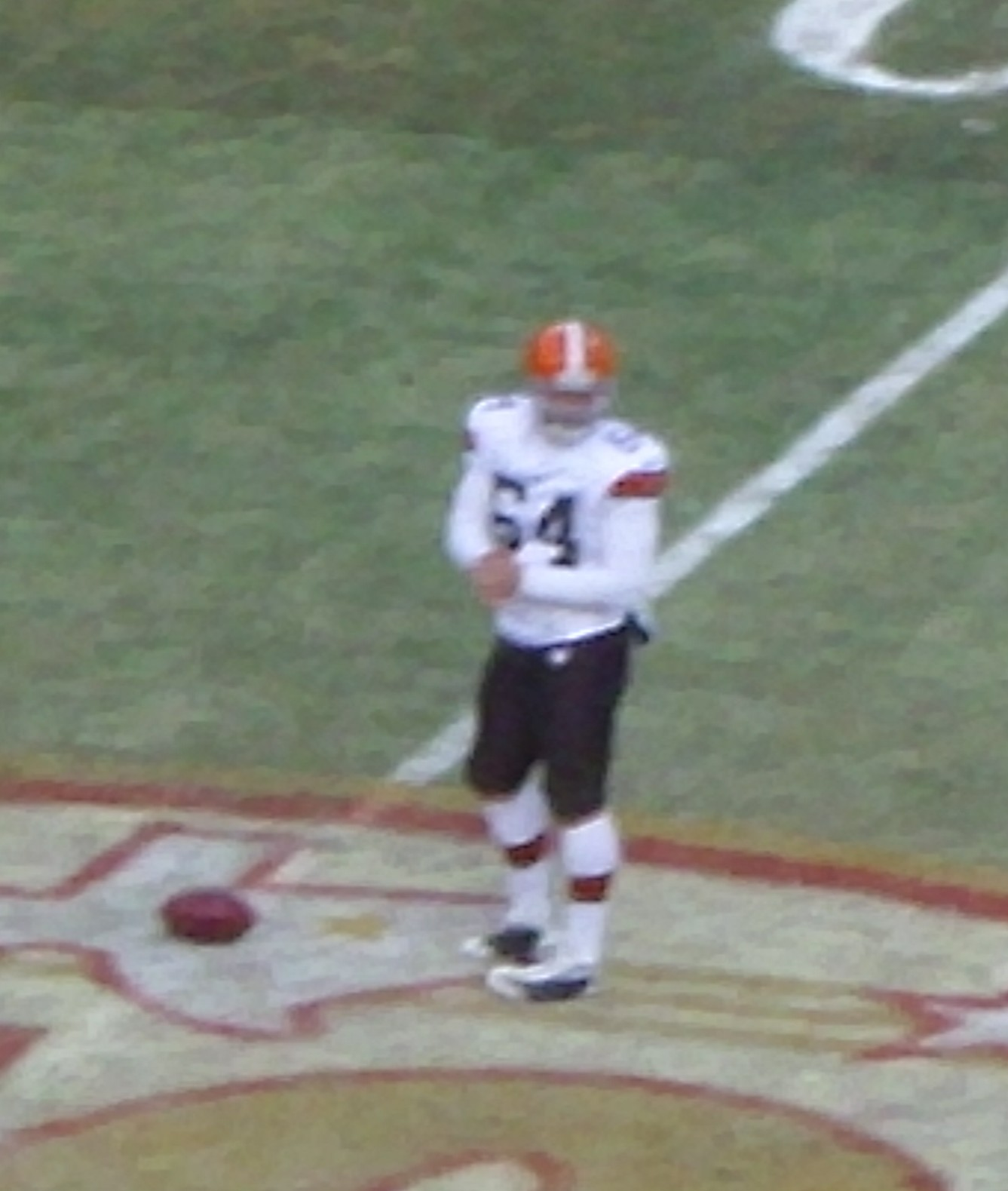
- Pontbriand with the Cleveland Browns in 2009

No. 64
- Positions: Long snapper, Center

Personal information
- Born: October 1, 1979 (age 47); Houston, Texas, U.S.
- Listed height: 6 ft 2 in (1.88 m)
- Listed weight: 255 lb (116 kg)

Career information
- High school: Clements (Sugar Land, Texas)
- College: Rice (1998–2002)
- NFL draft: 2003: 5th round, 142nd overall pick

Career history
- Cleveland Browns (2003–2011); San Francisco 49ers (2012)*
- * Offseason or practice squad member only

Awards and highlights
- 2× Pro Bowl (2007, 2008)

Career NFL statistics
- Games played: 134
- Total tackles: 17
- Stats at Pro Football Reference

Ryan David Pontbriand (born October 1, 1979) is an American former professional football player who was a long snapper and center in the National Football League (NFL). He played college football for the Rice Owls and was selected in the fifth round of the 2003 NFL draft by the Cleveland Browns. He has the distinction of being the highest-drafted pure long snapper in the history of the NFL draft.

== Early life ==
Pontbriand attended Clements High School in Sugar Land, Texas, where he was a three-year letterman and a full-time starter on the football team's offensive line. He was a first-team all-district selection as a senior after receiving an honorable mention as a junior. Pontbriand was named his team's offensive lineman of the year during his senior year and was his team's co-captain.

== College career ==
Ryan graduated high school and attended Rice University, redshirting his first year of eligibility in 1998. While at Rice, Pontbriand was the team's long snapper, and graduated with a degree in mechanical engineering.

== Professional career ==
Pre-draft measurables
Height	Weight
6 ft 2 1/4 in (1.89 m)	245 lb (111 kg)
Values from Pro Day

=== Cleveland Browns ===
After finishing his fifth year at Rice, Pontbriand was eligible for the NFL draft. In the fifth round of the 2003 NFL draft, Ryan was selected by the Cleveland Browns with the 142nd overall pick. Pontbriand is one of only thirteen long snappers drafted since 1982. Pontbriand missed only five games with the Browns, which occurred during the 2005 season due to a back injury. Pontbriand was named to the Pro Bowl as the "need" player in 2007, 2008.

On November 29, 2011, he was released by the Browns due to an injury that was believed to be career-ending.

=== San Francisco 49ers ===
Pontbriand signed with the San Francisco 49ers on February 21, 2012. He was brought in to provide competition to Brian Jennings at the position. He was released on June 15, 2012.
