= 2008 Pro Bowl =

National Football League all-star game

2008 NFL Pro Bowl
AFC	NFC
30	42
Head coach: Norv Turner (San Diego Chargers)	Head coach: Mike McCarthy (Green Bay Packers)
	1	2	3	4	Total
AFC	17	10	3	0	30
NFC	7	14	7	14	42
- Date: February 10, 2008
- Stadium: Aloha Stadium; Honolulu, Hawaii
- MVP: Adrian Peterson (Minnesota Vikings)
- Referee: Bill Carollo
- Attendance: 50,044

Ceremonies
- National anthem: Kelly Rowland
- Coin toss: Will Shields and United States Navy Admiral Timothy J. Keating

TV in the United States
- Network: Fox
- Announcers: Kenny Albert, Daryl Johnston, Tony Siragusa, and Brian Baldinger

The 2008 Pro Bowl was the National Football League's all-star game for the 2007 season. It was played at Aloha Stadium in Honolulu, Hawaii on February 10, 2008. The game was televised in the United States by Fox and began shortly after 11:40am local time (4:40pm EST) following Pole Qualifying for 2008 Daytona 500. The NFC won, 42–30, despite a 17-point first half AFC lead. NFC running back Adrian Peterson rushed 16 times for 129 yards and was named the game's MVP, winning a Cadillac CTS in recognition of his efforts.

The starting rosters for the game were released on December 18, 2007, with New England Patriots quarterback Tom Brady starting for the AFC and the Green Bay Packers' Brett Favre for the NFC. However, Brett Favre withdrew due to an ankle injury. Notable Pro Bowl selections included the late Sean Taylor. The Dallas Cowboys had a record thirteen players named to the Pro Bowl roster, while five teams, including all four members of the NFC South, had no players initially named (Jeff Garcia of the Tampa Bay Buccaneers was later chosen as a replacement quarterback for Brett Favre.) This was the first occasion since their 1–15 1980 season that the New Orleans Saints had no player make the Pro Bowl. The AFC was coached by Norv Turner of the San Diego Chargers staff, while Mike McCarthy and the staff of the Green Bay Packers coached the NFC. Three Washington Redskins players (Chris Cooley, Chris Samuels and Ethan Albright) wore #21 in memory of Taylor, their deceased teammate. The game featured 41 players appearing in their first Pro Bowl (out of 86 total players), the most in eight years. In addition, the NFC played their first defensive play with only ten players on the field, lacking a free safety, in Taylor's honor.

On February 4, 2008, Brady, Patriots receiver Randy Moss, Chargers tight end Antonio Gates, and Chargers defensive lineman Jamal Williams decided to pull out of the 2008 Pro Bowl. Brady was replaced by Cleveland Browns quarterback Derek Anderson, Moss was replaced by Cincinnati Bengals receiver Chad Johnson, Gates was replaced by Browns tight end Kellen Winslow, and Williams was replaced by Pittsburgh Steelers defensive lineman Casey Hampton.

The game was the most watched Pro Bowl since 2000, pulling in a Nielsen rating of 6.3 and a 12 share. It also marked the first ever Pro Bowl to be televised by Fox. The 2008 Pro Bowl also marked the fewest players represented by a Super Bowl winning team, with Osi Umenyiora being the lone representative of the New York Giants, winners of Super Bowl XLII.

== Scoring summary ==
- 1st Quarter
  - AFC – Lorenzo Neal 1-yard run (Rob Bironas kick), 10:59. AFC 7–0. Drive: 7 plays, 70 yards, 4:01.
  - NFC – Larry Fitzgerald 6-yard pass from Tony Romo (Nick Folk kick), 7:08. Tied 7–7. Drive: 9 plays, 54 yards, 3:51.
  - AFC – T.J. Houshmandzadeh 16-yard pass from Peyton Manning (Rob Bironas kick), 2:42. AFC 14–7. Drive: 9 plays, 58 yards, 4:26.
  - AFC – Rob Bironas 33-yard FG, 0:48. AFC 17–7. Drive: 5 plays, 14 yards, 1:41.

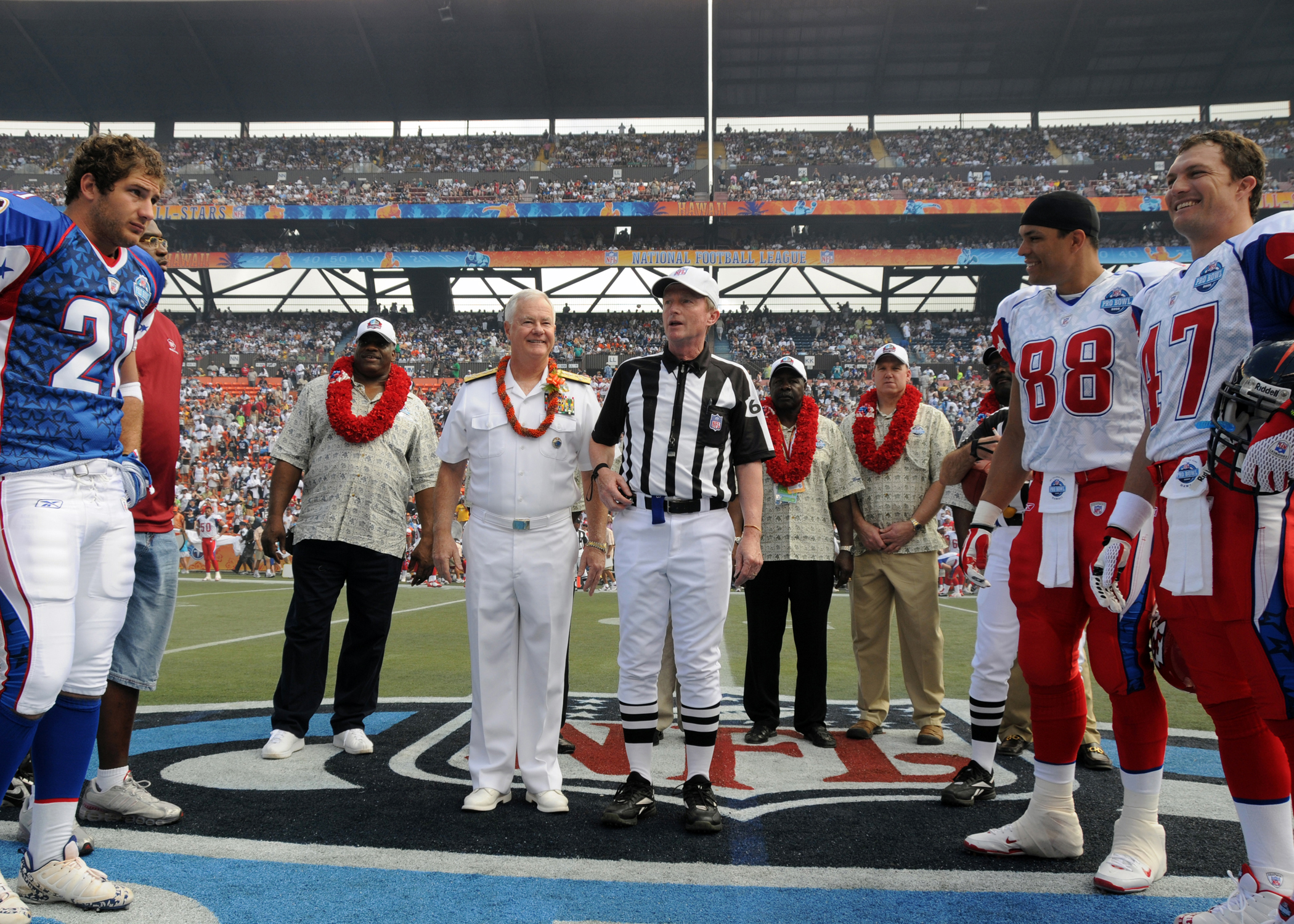
Pre-game coin toss

- 2nd Quarter
  - AFC – T.J. Houshmandzadeh 1-yard pass from Ben Roethlisberger (Rob Bironas kick), 12:08. AFC 24–7. Drive: 4 plays, 29 yards, 1:48.
  - NFC – Terrell Owens 6-yard pass from Tony Romo (Nick Folk kick), 7:58. AFC 24–14. Drive: 8 plays, 51 yards, 4:10.
  - AFC – Rob Bironas 48-yard FG, 3:30. AFC 27–14. Drive: 9 plays, 51 yards, 4:28.
  - NFC – Chris Cooley 17-yard pass from Matt Hasselbeck (Nick Folk kick), 0:28. AFC 27–21. Drive: 6 plays, 77 yards, 3:02.
- 3rd Quarter
  - NFC – Adrian Peterson 17-yard run (Nick Folk kick), 9:49. NFC 28–27. Drive: 9 plays, 67 yards, 5:11.
  - AFC – Rob Bironas 28-yard FG, 6:58. AFC 30–28. Drive: 6 plays, 56 yards, 2:51.
- 4th Quarter
  - NFC – Terrell Owens 6-yard pass from Jeff Garcia (Nick Folk kick), 12:29. NFC 35–30. Drive: 9 plays, 80 yards, 5:46.
  - NFC – Adrian Peterson 6-yard run (Nick Folk kick), 2:43. NFC 42–30. Drive: 9 plays, 73 yards, 5:21.

== AFC roster ==
=== Offense ===
Position	Starter(s)	Reserve(s)	Alternate(s)
Quarterback	12 Tom Brady, New England^{[b]}	18 Peyton Manning, Indianapolis^{[c]} 7 Ben Roethlisberger, Pittsburgh	3 Derek Anderson, Cleveland^{[a]}
Running back	21 LaDainian Tomlinson, San Diego^{[b]}	29 Joseph Addai, Indianapolis^{[c]} 39 Willie Parker, Pittsburgh^{[b]}	28 Fred Taylor, Jacksonville^{[a]} 23 Willis McGahee, Baltimore^{[a]}
Fullback	41 Lorenzo Neal, San Diego		
Wide receiver	81 Randy Moss, New England^{[b]} 87 Reggie Wayne, Indianapolis	17 Braylon Edwards, Cleveland^{[c]} 84 T.J. Houshmandzadeh, Cincinnati	85 Chad Johnson, Cincinnati^{[a]}
Tight end	85 Antonio Gates, San Diego^{[b]}	88 Tony Gonzalez, Kansas City^{[c]}	80 Kellen Winslow II, Cleveland^{[a]}
Offensive tackle	72 Matt Light, New England; 71 Jason Peters, Buffalo ^{[b]}	75 Jonathan Ogden, Baltimore ^{[b]}	73 Joe Thomas, Cleveland ^{[a]}^{[c]} 73 Marcus McNeill, San Diego ^{[a]}
Offensive guard	66 Alan Faneca, Pittsburgh; 70 Logan Mankins, New England	68 Kris Dielman, San Diego	
Center	63 Jeff Saturday, Indianapolis	67 Dan Koppen, New England	

=== Defense ===
Position	Starter(s)	Reserve(s)	Alternate(s)
Defensive end	69 Jared Allen, Kansas City; 93 Kyle Vanden Bosch, Tennessee	99 Jason Taylor, Miami^{[b]}	94 Aaron Schobel, Buffalo^{[a]}
Defensive tackle	92 Albert Haynesworth, Tennessee; 75 Vince Wilfork, New England	76 Jamal Williams, San Diego^{[b]}	98 Casey Hampton, Pittsburgh^{[a]}
Outside linebacker	92 James Harrison, Pittsburgh; 50 Mike Vrabel, New England	56 Shawne Merriman, San Diego	
Inside linebacker	59 DeMeco Ryans, Houston	52 Ray Lewis, Baltimore	
Cornerback	24 Champ Bailey, Denver; 22 Asante Samuel, New England	31 Antonio Cromartie, San Diego	
Free safety	20 Ed Reed, Baltimore		
Strong safety	21 Bob Sanders, Indianapolis^{[b]}	43 Troy Polamalu, Pittsburgh^{[b]}	47 John Lynch, Denver^{[a]}^{[c]} 41 Antoine Bethea, Indianapolis^{[a]}

=== Special teams ===
Position:	Player:
Punter	9 Shane Lechler, Oakland
Placekicker	2 Rob Bironas, Tennessee
Kick returner	16 Joshua Cribbs, Cleveland
Special teamer	81 Kassim Osgood, San Diego
Long snapper	64 Ryan Pontbriand, Cleveland^{[d]}

== NFC roster ==
=== Offense ===
Position	Starter(s)	Reserve(s)	Alternate(s)
Quarterback	4 Brett Favre, Green Bay^{[b]}	9 Tony Romo, Dallas^{[c]} 8 Matt Hasselbeck, Seattle	7 Jeff Garcia, Tampa Bay^{[a]}
Running back	28 Adrian Peterson, Minnesota	24 Marion Barber III, Dallas; 36 Brian Westbrook, Philadelphia	
Fullback	49 Tony Richardson, Minnesota		
Wide receiver	11 Larry Fitzgerald, Arizona; 81 Terrell Owens, Dallas	80 Donald Driver, Green Bay; 81 Torry Holt, St. Louis	
Tight end	82 Jason Witten, Dallas	47 Chris Cooley, Washington^{[f]}	
Offensive tackle	76 Flozell Adams, Dallas; 71 Walter Jones, Seattle^{[b]}	60 Chris Samuels, Washington^{[c]}^{[f]}	76 Chad Clifton, Green Bay^{[a]}
Offensive guard	70 Leonard Davis, Dallas; 76 Steve Hutchinson, Minnesota	73 Shawn Andrews, Philadelphia	
Center	65 Andre Gurode, Dallas	78 Matt Birk, Minnesota	

=== Defense ===
Position	Starter(s)	Reserve(s)	Alternate(s)
Defensive end	74 Aaron Kampman, Green Bay; 97 Patrick Kerney, Seattle^{[b]}	72 Osi Umenyiora, N.Y. Giants^{[c]}	58 Trent Cole, Philadelphia^{[a]}
Defensive tackle	93 Kevin Williams, Minnesota; 94 Pat Williams, Minnesota	91 Tommie Harris, Chicago^{[b]}	90 Darnell Dockett, Arizona^{[a]}
Outside linebacker	59 Julian Peterson, Seattle; 94 DeMarcus Ware, Dallas	55 Lance Briggs, Chicago^{[b]}	98 Greg Ellis, Dallas^{[a]}
Inside linebacker	51 Lofa Tatupu, Seattle	52 Patrick Willis, San Francisco	
Cornerback	31 Al Harris, Green Bay; 23 Marcus Trufant, Seattle	41 Terence Newman, Dallas	
Free safety	21 Sean Taylor, Washington^{[e]}	26 Ken Hamlin, Dallas^{[c]}	
Strong safety	42 Darren Sharper, Minnesota		31 Roy Williams, Dallas^{[g]}

=== Special teams ===
Position:	Player:
Punter	4 Andy Lee, San Francisco
Placekicker	6 Nick Folk, Dallas
Kick returner	23 Devin Hester, Chicago
Special teamer	94 Brendon Ayanbadejo, Chicago
Long snapper	67 Ethan Albright, Washington^{[d]}^{[f]}

Notes:

^{a} Replacement selection due to injury or vacancy
^{b} Injured player; selected but did not play
^{c} Replacement starter; selected as reserve
^{d} "Need player"; named by coach
^{e} Posthumous selection
^{f} Wore 21 in honor of Sean Taylor
^{g} Replacement for posthumous selection Sean Taylor

== Number of selections per team ==
AFC team	Selections	NFC team	Selections
San Diego Chargers	9	Dallas Cowboys	13
New England Patriots	8	Minnesota Vikings	7
Cleveland Browns	6	Seattle Seahawks	6
Indianapolis Colts	6	Green Bay Packers	5
Pittsburgh Steelers	6	Chicago Bears	4
Baltimore Ravens	4	Washington Redskins	4
Tennessee Titans	3	Philadelphia Eagles	3
Buffalo Bills	2	Arizona Cardinals	2
Cincinnati Bengals	2	San Francisco 49ers	2
Denver Broncos	2	New York Giants	1
Kansas City Chiefs	2	St. Louis Rams	1
Houston Texans	1	Tampa Bay Buccaneers	1
Jacksonville Jaguars	1	Atlanta Falcons	0
Miami Dolphins	1	Carolina Panthers	0
Oakland Raiders	1	Detroit Lions	0
New York Jets	0	New Orleans Saints	0

== Halftime ==
The halftime show featured a performance by the band Lifehouse, who played their songs "Hanging by a Moment" and "First Time".

== Foreign transmissions ==
- Denmark – TV3+
- Norway – SportN
- United Kingdom – Sky Sports
- Middle East – Showsports 4
