= 2010 Cleveland Browns season =

62nd season in franchise history

- Owner: Randy Lerner
- General manager: Tom Heckert
- Head coach: Eric Mangini
- Offensive coordinator: Brian Daboll
- Defensive coordinator: Rob Ryan
- Home stadium: Cleveland Browns Stadium

Results
- Record: 5–11
- Division place: 3rd AFC North
- Playoffs: Did not qualify
- Pro Bowlers: C Alex Mack; LT Joe Thomas

The 2010 season was the Cleveland Browns' 58th in the National Football League (NFL) and their 62nd overall. The team extended the longest playoff drought in franchise history to eight seasons after finishing with a 5–11 record, matching their win total from the 2009 season, and placed third in the AFC North. This season was the Browns' first under team president Mike Holmgren and general manager Tom Heckert, and their second under head coach Eric Mangini.

== Offseason ==
=== Personnel changes ===
On December 21, 2009, the Browns hired Mike Holmgren, former Green Bay Packers head coach and Seattle Seahawks head coach and general manager, to take over as the team president. His duties will include personnel management and oversight over all operations.

Although many believed that the institution of Holmgren as president would lead to the firing of Browns' head coach Eric Mangini, he announced his intent to retain Mangini and the entire coaching staff for the 2010 season on January 7, 2010.

On January 10, the Browns hired former Philadelphia Eagles' general manager Tom Heckert as general manager, the first major hire by Holmgren.

=== Roster changes ===
==== Free agents ====
Pos	Player	Tag	2010 team	Signed
LB	Marcus Benard	ERFA	Browns	March 17
LB	Blake Costanzo	ERFA	Browns	March 17
SS	*Abram Elam	RFA	Browns	June 14
TE	Greg Estandia	RFA	Browns	March 16
WR	Mike Furrey	UFA	Redskins	June 8
TE	Michael Gaines	UFA	Texans	April 23
G	Rex Hadnot	UFA	Cardinals	March 11
RB	*Jerome Harrison	RFA	Browns	June 14
LB	*D'Qwell Jackson	RFA	Browns	June 14
RB	Chris Jennings	ERFA	Browns	March 17
FS	Brodney Pool	RFA	Jets	March 11
LB	*Matt Roth	RFA	Browns	June 14
FS	Hank Poteat	UFA		
LB	*Jason Trusnik	RFA	Browns	March 12
T	Ryan Tucker	UFA	Retired	
FS	Ray Ventrone	ERFA	Browns	March 5
FB	*Lawrence Vickers	RFA	Browns	June 14
G	Billy Yates	UFA	Browns	March 18

Player re-signed by Browns

* The Browns used a second-round tender on these players

==== Releases ====
Pos	Player	Released	2010 team	Signed
QB	Derek Anderson	March 9	Cardinals	March 17
C	Hank Fraley	March 3	Rams	March 14
TE	Steve Heiden	March 12		
RB	Jamal Lewis	February 17		
WR	Donté Stallworth	February 9	Ravens	February 17

==== Signings ====
Pos	Player	2009 team	Signed
QB	Jake Delhomme	Panthers	March 13
WR	Bobby Engram	Chiefs	July 8
LB	Scott Fujita	Saints	March 7
C	Eric Ghiaciuc	Chargers	April 8
T	Tony Pashos	49ers	March 7
TE	Alex Smith	Eagles	May 4
CB	DeAngelo Smith	Lions	April 28
TE	Benjamin Watson	Patriots	March 12

==== Trades ====
On March 5, the Browns traded DE Corey Williams and a seventh-round pick in the 2010 NFL draft to the Detroit Lions for a fifth-round pick in 2010.

On March 8, the Browns traded a conditional draft pick in 2011 to the Seattle Seahawks for QB Seneca Wallace.

On March 14, the Browns traded QB Brady Quinn to the Denver Broncos for RB Peyton Hillis, a sixth round draft pick in 2011, and a conditional draft pick in 2012.

Also on March 14, the Browns traded LB Kamerion Wimbley to the Oakland Raiders for a 2010 third round draft pick.

On April 2, the Browns traded LB Alex Hall and 2010 fourth- and fifth- round draft picks (Nos. 105 and 137, respectively) to the Philadelphia Eagles for CB Sheldon Brown and LB Chris Gocong.

==== Draft ====
Round	Pick	Player	Position	College	Signed	Notes
1	7	Joe Haden	Cornerback	Florida	July 31	
2	38	T. J. Ward	Safety	Oregon	July 26	
2	59	Montario Hardesty	Running back	Tennessee	July 26	From Dallas via Philadelphia
3	85	Colt McCoy	Quarterback	Texas	July 23	from New England via Oakland
3	92	Shawn Lauvao	Offensive tackle	Arizona State	July 23	from New York Jets
5	160	Larry Asante	Safety	Nebraska	July 14	from New York Jets
6	177	Carlton Mitchell	Wide receiver	South Florida	July 7	
6	186	Clifton Geathers	Defensive end	South Carolina	June 28	from Carolina

The Browns did not have a fourth- or seventh-round selection

==== Undrafted free agents ====
Position	Player	College	Signed	Cut
T	Casey Bender	South Dakota State	April 30	
DB	Benjamin Burney	Colorado	April 30	
DB	Chris Chancellor	Clemson	April 30	
LB	Auston English	Oklahoma	April 30	
WR	Johnathan Haggerty	Oklahoma State	April 30	
DE	Swanson Miller	Oklahoma State	April 30	
WR	Dion Morton	Colorado State	April 30	
T	Joel Reinders	Waterloo	April 30	
DT	Kwaku Danso	East Carolina	May 17	
WR	Aaron Valentin	Purdue	April 30	May 4
TE	Troy Wagner	Indiana	April 30	May 4

=== Uniform changes ===
After wearing solid brown pants with their white away jerseys during their 2009 campaign, the Browns returned to wearing their traditional white pants with orange-brown-orange lining for their 2010 away games. Furthermore, they wore white socks with orange-brown-orange piping with these uniforms, bringing back the "classic" Browns away look, as well as marking a departure from the past decade when solid brown socks were worn with both the home and away uniforms. These changes were confirmed during the team's first preseason game against the Packers on August 14 and by Eric Mangini the following week.

== Staff ==
Cleveland Browns 2010 staff
Front office: Owner – Randy Lerner; President – Mike Holmgren; Executive vice president of business operations – Bryan Wiedmeier; General manager – Tom Heckert; Vice president of football operations – Mark Schiefelbein; Vice president of football administration – Matt Thomas; Director of player personnel – Jon Sandusky; Director of college scouting – John Spytek; Director of pro personnel – Keith Gilbertson; Head coaches: Head coach – Eric Mangini; Assistant to the head coach – Luke Steckel; Offensive coaches: Offensive coordinator – Brian Daboll; Quarterbacks – Carl Smith; Running backs – Gary Brown; Wide receivers – George McDonald; Tight ends – Steve Hagen; Offensive line – George Warhop; Assistant offensive line – Andy Dickerson; Offensive assistant – Dan Shamash	Defensive coaches: Defensive coordinator – Rob Ryan; Defensive line – Bryan Cox; Linebackers – Matt Eberflus; Defensive backs – Jerome Henderson; Defensive assistant – Ben Bloom; Special teams coaches: Special teams coordinator – Brad Seely; Assistant special teams – Tracy Smith; Strength and conditioning: Strength and conditioning – Kent Johnston; Assistant strength and conditioning – Rick Lyle

== Roster ==
2010 Cleveland Browns roster
Quarterbacks (QB): 17 Jake Delhomme; 12 Colt McCoy; 6 Seneca Wallace; Running backs (RB): 22 Mike Bell; 40 Peyton Hillis; 47 Lawrence Vickers FB; Wide receivers (WR): 16 Josh Cribbs; 11 Mohamed Massaquoi; 18 Carlton Mitchell; 10 Jordan Norwood; 80 Brian Robiskie; 83 Chansi Stuckey; 88 Demetrius Williams; Tight ends (TE): 84 Robert Royal; 81 Alex Smith; 82 Ben Watson	Offensive linemen (OL): 66 Shawn Lauvao G; 55 Alex Mack C; 78 John St. Clair T; 65 Eric Steinbach G; 73 Joe Thomas T; 60 Steve Vallos C; 77 Floyd Womack G; Defensive linemen (DL): 90 Kenyon Coleman DE; 94 Travis Ivey DE; 97 Jayme Mitchell DE; 74 Ko Quaye NT; 67 Derreck Robinson DE; 92 Shaun Rogers DE; 71 Ahtyba Rubin NT; 70 Brian Sanford DE; 91 Brian Schaefering DE	Linebackers (LB): 57 Eric Alexander ILB; 50 Eric Barton ILB; 58 Marcus Benard OLB; 96 David Bowens ILB; 59 Titus Brown ILB; 51 Chris Gocong ILB; 95 Steve Octavien OLB; 53 Matt Roth OLB; 93 Jason Trusnik ILB; Defensive backs (DB): 20 Mike Adams FS; 24 Sheldon Brown CB; 26 Abram Elam SS; 36 Coye Francies CB; 23 Joe Haden CB; 28 Sabby Piscitelli FS; 27 Nick Sorensen FS; 41 Ray Ventrone SS; 43 T. J. Ward FS; Special teams (ST): 4 Phil Dawson K; 2 Reggie Hodges P; 64 Ryan Pontbriand LS	Practice squad: -- Eric Bakhtiari LB; 63 Branndon Braxton T; 44 Tyler Clutts FB; 85 Tyson DeVree TE; 75 Pat Murray G; 39 Quinn Porter RB; 25 DeAngelo Smith CB; 72 Phil Trautwein T; Reserve: 62 Titus Adams DE (IR); 54 Blake Costanzo ILB (IR); 88 Greg Estandia TE (IR); 99 Scott Fujita OLB (IR); 86 Johnathan Haggerty WR (IR); 31 Montario Hardesty RB (IR); 52 D'Qwell Jackson ILB (IR); 56 Kaluka Maiava ILB (IR); 89 Evan Moore TE (IR); 79 Tony Pashos T (IR); 98 Robaire Smith DE (IR); 21 Eric Wright CB (IR); 68 Billy Yates G (IR); Rookies in italics 53 active, 13 reserve, 8 practice squad

== Preseason ==
=== Schedule ===
Week	Date	Opponent	Result	Record	Venue	Recap
1	August 14	at Green Bay Packers	W 27–24	1–0	Lambeau Field	Recap
2	August 21	St. Louis Rams	L 17–19	1–1	Cleveland Browns Stadium	Recap
3	August 28	at Detroit Lions	L 27–35	1–2	Ford Field	Recap
4	September 2	Chicago Bears	W 13–10	2–2	Cleveland Browns Stadium	Recap

== Regular season ==
=== Schedule ===
Week	Date	Opponent	Result	Record	Venue	Recap
1	September 12	at Tampa Bay Buccaneers	**L** 14–17	0–1	Raymond James Stadium	Recap
2	September 19	Kansas City Chiefs	**L** 14–16	0–2	Cleveland Browns Stadium	Recap
3	September 26	at **Baltimore Ravens**	**L** 17–24	0–3	M&T Bank Stadium	Recap
4	October 3	**Cincinnati Bengals**	**W** 23–20	1–3	Cleveland Browns Stadium	Recap
5	October 10	Atlanta Falcons	**L** 10–20	1–4	Cleveland Browns Stadium	Recap
6	October 17	at **Pittsburgh Steelers**	**L** 10–28	1–5	Heinz Field	Recap
7	October 24	at New Orleans Saints	**W** 30–17	2–5	Louisiana Superdome	Recap
8	Bye					
9	November 7	New England Patriots	**W** 34–14	3–5	Cleveland Browns Stadium	Recap
10	November 14	New York Jets	**L** 20–26 (OT)	3–6	Cleveland Browns Stadium	Recap
11	November 21	at Jacksonville Jaguars	**L** 20–24	3–7	EverBank Field	Recap
12	November 28	Carolina Panthers	**W** 24–23	4–7	Cleveland Browns Stadium	Recap
13	December 5	at Miami Dolphins	**W** 13–10	5–7	Sun Life Stadium	Recap
14	December 12	at Buffalo Bills	**L** 6–13	5–8	Ralph Wilson Stadium	Recap
15	December 19	at **Cincinnati Bengals**	**L** 17–19	5–9	Paul Brown Stadium	Recap
16	December 26	**Baltimore Ravens**	**L** 10–20	5–10	Cleveland Browns Stadium	Recap
17	January 2	**Pittsburgh Steelers**	**L** 9–41	5–11	Cleveland Browns Stadium	Recap

Note: Intra-divisional opponents are in bold text.

=== Standings ===
AFC North
	W	L	T	PCT	DIV	CONF	PF	PA	STK
^{(2)} Pittsburgh Steelers	12	4	0	.750	5–1	9–3	375	232	W2
^{(5)} Baltimore Ravens	12	4	0	.750	4–2	9–3	357	270	W4
Cleveland Browns	5	11	0	.313	1–5	3–9	271	332	L4
Cincinnati Bengals	4	12	0	.250	2–4	3–9	322	395	L1

=== Game summaries ===
==== Week 1: at Tampa Bay Buccaneers ====
Week 1: Cleveland Browns at Tampa Bay Buccaneers – Game summary

Quarter	1	2	3	4	Total
Browns	7	7	0	0	**14**
**Buccaneers**	3	7	0	7	**17**

at Raymond James Stadium, Tampa, Florida

- Date: September 12
- Game time: 1:00 p.m. EDT
- Game weather: Partly cloudy, 87 °F (31 °C)
- Game attendance: 47,211
- Referee: Jeff Triplette
- TV announcers (CBS): Spero Dedes and Rich Gannon
- Recap, Game Book

Game information

**First quarter**

- CLE – Mohamed Massaquoi 41-yard pass from Jake Delhomme (Phil Dawson kick), 2:57. Browns 7–0. **Drive: 6 plays, 61 yards, 2:15.**
- TB – Connor Barth 49-yard field goal, 0:55. Browns 7–3. **Drive: 5 plays, 49 yards, 1:58.**

**Second quarter**

- CLE – Peyton Hillis 10-yard run (Phil Dawson kick), 5:42. Browns 14–3. **Drive: 5 plays, 63 yards, 3:09.**
- TB – Mike Williams 3-yard pass from Josh Freeman (Connor Barth kick), 0:26. Browns 14–10. **Drive: 1 play, 3 yards, 0:08.**

**Third quarter**

- No scoring plays.

**Fourth quarter**

- TB – Micheal Spurlock 33-yard pass from Josh Freeman (Connor Barth kick), 6:56. Buccaneers 17–14. **Drive: 6 plays, 47 yards, 1:52.**

**Top passers**

- CLE – Jake Delhomme – 20/37, 227 yards, TD, 2 INT
- TB – Josh Freeman – 17/28, 182 yards, 2 TD, INT

**Top rushers**

- CLE – Jerome Harrison – 9 rushes, 52 yards
- TB – Cadillac Williams – 22 rushes, 75 yards

**Top receivers**

- CLE – Evan Moore – 3 receptions, 87 yards
- TB – Micheal Spurlock – 2 receptions, 49 yards, TD

The Cleveland Browns began their NFL season at Raymond James Stadium for a showdown against the Tampa Bay Buccaneers. In the first quarter, the Browns had the early lead as QB Jake Delhomme connected on a 41-yard touchdown pass to WR Mohamed Massaquoi, but the Buccaneers responded with a Connor Barth field goal. In the second quarter, the Browns increased their lead on a touchdown run by RB Peyton Hillis. Near the end of the half, the Browns were driving down the field until Delhomme threw an interception that allowed the Buccaneers to score a touchdown in the half's closing seconds. In the fourth quarter, the Buccaneers took the lead for good on a 33-yard touchdown pass from QB Josh Freeman to WR Micheal Spurlock.

With the loss, the Browns began their season at 0–1.

==== Week 2: vs. Kansas City Chiefs ====
Week 2: Kansas City Chiefs at Cleveland Browns – Game summary

Quarter	1	2	3	4	Total
**Chiefs**	3	7	3	3	**16**
Browns	0	14	0	0	**14**

at Cleveland Browns Stadium, Cleveland, Ohio

- Date: September 19
- Game time: 1:00 p.m. EDT
- Game weather: Cloudy, 64 °F (18 °C)
- Game attendance: 65,377
- Referee: Carl Cheffers
- TV announcers (CBS): Don Criqui and Steve Beuerlein
- Recap, Game Book

Game information

**First quarter**

- KC – Ryan Succop 35-yard field goal, 8:43. Chiefs 3–0. **Drive: 4 plays, 6 yards, 0:36.**

**Second quarter**

- CLE – Peyton Hillis 1-yard run (Phil Dawson kick), 12:31. Browns 7–3. **Drive: 10 plays, 98 yards, 5:06.**
- KC – Brandon Flowers 33-yard interception return (Ryan Succop kick), 10:02. Chiefs 10–7.
- CLE – Josh Cribbs 65-yard pass from Seneca Wallace (Phil Dawson kick), 8:43. Browns 14–10. **Drive: 3 plays, 74 yards, 1:19.**

**Third quarter**

- KC – Ryan Succop 26-yard field goal, 8:48. Browns 14–13. **Drive: 11 plays, 63 yards, 6:15.**

**Fourth quarter**

- KC – Ryan Succop 23-yard field goal, 7:44. Chiefs 16–14. **Drive: 14 plays, 68 yards, 6:31.**

**Top passers**

- KC – Matt Cassel – 16/28, 176 yards, 2 INT
- CLE – Seneca Wallace – 16/31, 229 yards, TD, INT

**Top rushers**

- KC – Thomas Jones – 22 rushes, 83 yards
- CLE – Peyton Hillis – 8 rushes, 35 yards, TD

**Top receivers**

- KC – Tony Moeaki – 5 receptions, 58 yards
- CLE – Josh Cribbs – 3 receptions, 74 yards, TD

The Browns played their home opener against the Kansas City Chiefs looking to bounce back from a close loss in Week 1 against the Buccaneers. With starting QB Jake Delhomme out with an ankle injury, Seneca Wallace started the game for the Browns. Chiefs K Ryan Succop started the scoring with an early field goal. In the second quarter, the Browns scored on a 1-yard run by RB Peyton Hillis, but soon gave the lead back on an interception returned by CB Brandon Flowers. However, the Browns took a 14–10 lead into halftime on a deep touchdown pass from Wallace to WR Josh Cribbs. After the half, the Browns' offense stalled, and Succop kicked two more field goals to give the Chiefs a 16–14 victory.

With the loss, the Browns fell to 0–2.

==== Week 3: at Baltimore Ravens ====
Week 3: Cleveland Browns at Baltimore Ravens – Game summary

Quarter	1	2	3	4	Total
Browns	3	7	0	7	**17**
**Ravens**	7	7	0	10	**24**

at M&T Bank Stadium, Baltimore, Maryland

- Date: September 26
- Game time: 1:00 p.m. EDT
- Game weather: Cloudy, chance of rain, 64 °F (18 °C)
- Game attendance: 71,119
- Referee: Scott Green
- TV announcers (CBS): Don Criqui and Steve Beuerlein
- Recap, Game Book

Game information

**First quarter**

- CLE – Phil Dawson 38-yard field goal, 6:14. Browns 3–0. **Drive: 12 plays, 57 yards, 6:36.**
- BAL – Anquan Boldin 8-yard pass from Joe Flacco (Billy Cundiff kick), 1:29. Ravens 7–3. **Drive: 10 plays, 85 yards, 4:45.**

**Second quarter**

- BAL – Anquan Boldin 12-yard pass from Joe Flacco (Billy Cundiff kick), 5:59. Ravens 14–3. **Drive: 10 plays, 93 yards, 5:53.**
- CLE – Peyton Hillis 1-yard run (Phil Dawson kick), 0:13. Ravens 14–6. **Drive: 11 plays, 83 yards, 5:46.**

**Third quarter**

- No scoring plays.

**Fourth quarter**

- CLE – Benjamin Watson 1-yard pass from Seneca Wallace (Phil Dawson kick), 14:54. Ravens 14–13. **Drive: 6 plays, 86 yards, 1:51.**
- BAL – Anquan Boldin 27-yard pass from Joe Flacco (Billy Cundiff kick), 9:13. Ravens 21–13. **Drive: 10 plays, 69 yards, 5:41.**
- BAL – Billy Cundiff 49-yard field goal, 5:29. Ravens 24–13. **Drive: 6 plays, 11 yards, 2:10.**

**Top passers**

- CLE – Seneca Wallace – 18/24, 141 yards, TD
- BAL – Joe Flacco – 22/31, 262 yards, 3 TD

**Top rushers**

- CLE – Peyton Hillis – 22 rushes, 144 yards, TD
- BAL – Ray Rice – 15 rushes, 80 yards

**Top receivers**

- CLE – Josh Cribbs – 5 receptions, 58 yards
- BAL – Anquan Boldin – 8 receptions, 142 yards, 3 TD

Still looking for a win the Browns flew to M&T Bank Stadium for an AFC North rivalry match against the Ravens. In the 1st quarter the Browns took the early lead when kicker Phil Dawson made a 28-yard field goal, which didn't last very long after QB Joe Flacco found WR Anquan Boldin on an 8 and a 12-yard TD pass. After that the Browns replied and eventually got the lead back when RB Peyton Hillis made a 1-yard TD run, followed in the 4th quarter by QB Seneca Wallace completing a 1-yard TD pass to TE Benjamin Watson. Then the Browns fell behind when Flacco made a 27-yard TD pass to WR Anquan Boldin, followed by kicker Billy Cundiff nailing a 49-yard field goal.

With the loss, Cleveland fell to 0–3.

==== Week 4: vs. Cincinnati Bengals ====
Week 4: Cincinnati Bengals at Cleveland Browns – Game summary

Quarter	1	2	3	4	Total
Bengals	0	10	3	7	**20**
**Browns**	3	10	10	0	**23**

at Cleveland Browns Stadium, Cleveland, Ohio

- Date: October 3
- Game time: 1:00 p.m. EDT
- Game weather: Cloudy, 54 °F (12 °C)
- Game attendance: 66,731
- Referee: Jerome Boger
- TV announcers (CBS): Bill Macatee and Rich Gannon
- Recap, Game Book

Game information

**First quarter**

- CLE – Phil Dawson 30-yard field goal, 2:28. Browns 3–0. **Drive: 9 plays, 39 yards, 3:20.**

**Second quarter**

- CLE – Evan Moore 24-yard pass from Seneca Wallace (Phil Dawson kick), 11:04. Browns 10–0. **Drive: 8 plays, 87 yards, 4:45.**
- CIN – Mike Nugent 24-yard field goal, 7:16. Browns 10–3. **Drive: 8 plays, 61 yards, 3:48.**
- CIN – Terrell Owens 78-yard pass from Carson Palmer (Mike Nugent kick), 3:30. Tied 10–10. **Drive: 2 plays, 75 yards, 0:59.**
- CLE – Phil Dawson 31-yard field goal, 0:00. Browns 13–10. **Drive: 8 plays, 53 yards, 1:31.**

**Third quarter**

- CLE – Peyton Hillis 1-yard run (Phil Dawson kick), 8:54. Browns 20–10. **Drive: 11 plays, 64 yards, 6:06.**
- CLE – Phil Dawson 22-yard field goal, 6:32. Browns 23–10. **Drive: 4 plays, 8 yards, 1:32.**
- CIN – Mike Nugent 25-yard field goal, 1:14. Browns 23–13. **Drive: 10 plays, 76 yards, 5:18.**

**Fourth quarter**

- CIN – Brian Leonard 3-yard pass from Carson Palmer (Mike Nugent kick), 10:44. Browns 23–20. **Drive: 9 plays, 80 yards, 4:05.**

**Top passers**

- CIN – Carson Palmer – 25/36, 371 yards, 2 TD
- CLE – Seneca Wallace – 18/30, 184 yards, TD, INT

**Top rushers**

- CIN – Cedric Benson – 15 rushes, 60 yards
- CLE – Peyton Hillis – 27 rushes, 102 yards, TD

**Top receivers**

- CIN – Terrell Owens – 10 rushes, 222 yards, TD
- CLE – Benjamin Watson – 6 rushes, 60 yards

Still looking for their first win of the season, the Browns went home for a Week 4 AFC North duel with the Cincinnati Bengals in Round 1 of 2010's Battle of Ohio.

Cleveland got the early lead in the first quarter as kicker Phil Dawson got a 30-yard field goal. The Browns added onto their lead in the second quarter as quarterback Seneca Wallace completed a 24-yard touchdown pass to tight end Evan Moore. The Bengals answered with kicker Mike Nugent's 24-yard field goal, followed by quarterback Carson Palmer finding wide receiver Terrell Owens on a 78-yard touchdown pass. The Browns would close out the half with Dawson getting a 31-yard field goal after linebacker Scott Fujita blocked a Bengals field goal attempt.

In the third quarter, Cleveland picked up right where they left off as running back Peyton Hillis got a 1-yard touchdown run, followed by Dawson's 22-yard field goal. Afterwards, Cincinnati answered with Nugent making a 25-yard field goal. The Bengals tried to rally in the fourth quarter as Palmer found running back Brian Leonard on a 3-yard touchdown pass, yet the defense prevented Cincinnati from getting any closer.

With the win, the Browns improved to 1–3.

==== Week 5: vs. Atlanta Falcons ====
Week 5: Atlanta Falcons at Cleveland Browns – Game summary

Quarter	1	2	3	4	Total
**Falcons**	0	6	7	7	**20**
Browns	0	7	3	0	**10**

at Cleveland Browns Stadium, Cleveland, Ohio

- Date: October 10
- Game time: 1:00 p.m. EDT
- Game weather: Sunny, 66 °F (19 °C)
- Game attendance: 65,290
- Referee: John Parry
- TV announcers (FOX): Chris Myers and Charles Davis
- Recap, Game Book

Game information

**First quarter**

- No scoring plays.

**Second quarter**

- ATL – Matt Bryant 24-yard field goal, 14:52. Falcons 3–0. **Drive: 12 plays, 66 yards, 4:21.**
- CLE – Peyton Hillis 19-yard pass from Seneca Wallace (Phil Dawson kick), 12:25. Browns 7–3. **Drive: 5 plays, 56 yards, 2:30.**
- ATL – Matt Bryant 30-yard field goal, 5:04. Browns 7–6. **Drive: 14 plays, 70 yards, 7:19.**

**Third quarter**

- CLE – Phil Dawson 19-yard field goal, 10:00. Browns 10–6. **Drive: 6 plays, 22 yards, 3:07.**
- ATL – Roddy White 45-yard pass from Matt Ryan (Matt Bryant kick), 8:05. Falcons 13–10. **Drive: 4 plays, 68 yards, 2:00.**

**Fourth quarter**

- ATL – Kroy Biermann 31-yard interception return (Matt Bryant kick), 4:14. Falcons 20–10.

**Top passers**

- ATL – Matt Ryan – 16/28, 187 yards, TD
- CLE – Seneca Wallace – 11/15, 139 yards, TD

**Top rushers**

- ATL – Michael Turner – 19 rushes, 140 yards
- CLE – Peyton Hillis – 10 rushes, 28 yards

**Top receivers**

- ATL – Roddy White – 5 receptions, 101 yards, TD
- CLE – Mohamed Massaquoi – 5 receptions, 55 yards

The Browns stayed at home for their Week 5 game against the Atlanta Falcons, and tried to build on their first win of the season. The Falcons scored first, on a 24-yard field goal by kicker Matt Bryant early in the second quarter. The Browns soon answered with a 19-yard touchdown pass from quarterback Seneca Wallace to running back Peyton Hillis. Bryant hit another field goal in the quarter to cut the Cleveland lead to one point. Wallace was injured near halftime, and did not return. In the second half, quarterback Jake Delhomme came out for the Browns, but the offense failed to generate any momentum other than a Phil Dawson field goal. The Falcons took the lead when wide receiver Roddy White caught a 45-yard pass from quarterback Matt Ryan. Cleveland tried to mount a comeback, but an interception return by defensive end Kroy Biermann sealed the win for Atlanta, 20–10.

With the loss, the Browns fell to 1–4.

==== Week 6: at Pittsburgh Steelers ====
Week 6: Cleveland Browns at Pittsburgh Steelers – Game summary

Quarter	1	2	3	4	Total
Browns	3	0	0	7	**10**
**Steelers**	0	7	7	14	**28**

at Heinz Field, Pittsburgh, Pennsylvania

- Date: October 17
- Game time: 1:00 p.m. EDT
- Game weather: Sunny, 61 °F (16 °C)
- Game attendance: 65,168
- Referee: Walt Anderson
- TV announcers (CBS): Kevin Harlan and Solomon Wilcots
- Recap, Game Book

Game information

**First quarter**

- CLE – Phil Dawson 39-yard field goal, 1:51. Browns 3–0. **Drive: 7 plays, 14 yards, 4:16.**

**Second quarter**

- PIT – Mike Wallace 29-yard pass from Ben Roethlisberger (Jeff Reed kick), 10:40. Steelers 7–3. **Drive: 11 plays, 81 yards, 6:11.**

**Third quarter**

- PIT – Hines Ward 8-yard pass from Ben Roethlisberger (Jeff Reed kick), 3:13. Steelers 14–3. **Drive: 5 plays, 96 yards, 1:59.**

**Fourth quarter**

- PIT – Rashard Mendenhall 2-yard run (Jeff Reed kick), 5:50. Steelers 21–3. **Drive: 4 plays, 13 yards, 2:00.**
- CLE – Benjamin Watson 12-yard pass from Colt McCoy (Phil Dawson kick), 4:09. Steelers 21–10. **Drive: 6 plays, 70 yards, 1:41.**
- PIT – Heath Miller 14-yard pass from Ben Roethlisberger (Jeff Reed kick), 1:25. Steelers 28–10. **Drive: 3 plays, 18 yards, 0:17.**

**Top passers**

- CLE – Colt McCoy – 23/33, 281 yards, TD, 2 INT
- PIT – Ben Roethlisberger – 16/27, 257 yards, 3 TD, INT

**Top rushers**

- CLE – Peyton Hillis – 12 rushes, 41 yards
- PIT – Rashard Mendenhall – 27 rushes, 84 yards, TD

**Top receivers**

- CLE – Benjamin Watson – 6 receptions, 88 yards, TD
- PIT – Mike Wallace – 3 receptions, 90 yards, TD

Hoping to rebound from their loss to the Falcons, the Browns flew to Heinz Field for a Week 6 AFC North duel with their archrival, the Pittsburgh Steelers. The Browns were forced to start third string rookie quarterback Colt McCoy as injuries sidelined Jake Delhomme and Seneca Wallace. Cleveland delivered the opening punch in the first quarter as kicker Phil Dawson made a 39-yard field goal, his 235th field goal as a Cleveland Brown which broke Lou Groza's franchise record. The Steelers would take the lead in the second quarter as quarterback Ben Roethlisberger completed a 29-yard touchdown pass to wide receiver Mike Wallace.

The Browns' deficit increased in the third quarter as Roethlisberger found wide receiver Hines Ward on an 8-yard touchdown pass. Cleveland tried to rally as McCoy completed a 12-yard touchdown pass to tight end Benjamin Watson, but Pittsburgh would pull away with Roethlisberger's 14-yard touchdown pass to tight end Heath Miller.

With the loss, the Browns fell to 1–5.

==== Week 7: at New Orleans Saints ====
Week 7: Cleveland Browns at New Orleans Saints – Game summary

Quarter	1	2	3	4	Total
**Browns**	10	10	0	10	**30**
Saints	0	3	0	14	**17**

at Louisiana Superdome, New Orleans, Louisiana

- Date: October 24
- Game time: 1:00 p.m. EDT/12:00 p.m. CDT
- Game weather: None (indoor stadium)
- Game attendance: 70,077
- Referee: Walt Coleman
- TV announcers (CBS): Kevin Harlan and Solomon Wilcots
- Recap, Game Book

Game information

**First quarter**

- CLE – Phil Dawson 23-yard field goal, 10:25. Browns 3–0. **Drive: 6 plays, 14 yards, 2:43.**
- CLE – Peyton Hillis 4-yard run (Phil Dawson kick), 6:48. Browns 10–0. **Drive: 4 plays, 56 yards, 1:32.**

**Second quarter**

- NO – Garrett Hartley 32-yard field goal, 5:32. Browns 10–3. **Drive: 10 plays, 44 yards, 4:21.**
- CLE – Phil Dawson 21-yard field goal, 2:18. Browns 13–3. **Drive: 8 plays, 75 yards, 3:14.**
- CLE – David Bowens 30-yard interception return (Phil Dawson kick), 1:49. Browns 20–3.

**Third quarter**

- No scoring plays.

**Fourth quarter**

- NO – David Thomas 11-yard pass from Drew Brees (Garrett Hartley kick), 13:29. Browns 20–10. **Drive: 14 plays, 89 yards, 8:33.**
- CLE – Phil Dawson 38-yard field goal, 5:55. Browns 23–10. **Drive: 13 plays, 50 yards, 7:34.**
- CLE – David Bowens 64-yard interception return (Phil Dawson kick), 3:33. Browns 30–10.
- NO – Marques Colston 8-yard pass from Drew Brees (Garrett Hartley kick), 1:38. Browns 30–17. **Drive: 11 plays, 76 yards, 1:55.**

**Top passers**

- CLE – Colt McCoy – 9/16, 74 yards
- NO – Drew Brees – 37/56, 356 yards, 2 TD, 4 INT

**Top rushers**

- CLE – Peyton Hillis – 16 rushes, 69 yards, TD
- NO – Chris Ivory – 15 rushes, 48 yards

**Top receveivers**

- CLE – Brian Robiskie – 3 receptions, 25 yards
- NO – Marques Colston – 10 receptions, 112 yards, TD

The Cleveland Browns headed south to the Louisiana Superdome for their Week 7 battle against the defending Super Bowl champion New Orleans Saints. Cleveland struck first, on a 23-yard field goal by kicker Phil Dawson and a 4-yard run by running back Peyton Hillis to take a 10–0 lead after one quarter. In the second quarter, New Orleans closed the gap on a Garrett Hartley-yard field goal, but the Browns answered with another Dawson field goal and a 30-yard interception return by linebacker David Bowens to push the lead to 20–3 at the half. Special teams played a large role for the Browns in the half, with a 62-yard punt return by Eric Wright thanks to a Josh Cribbs lateral, and a 68-yard rush on a fake punt by punter Reggie Hodges both leading to field goals.

In the fourth quarter, quarterback Drew Brees connected with tight end David Thomas to pull within 10, but another Dawson field goal and a second Bowens interception return sealed the win for the Browns.

With the win, the Browns entered their bye week at 2–5. This win also marked the third consecutive season in which the Browns defeated the defending Super Bowl champion.

==== Week 9: vs. New England Patriots ====
Week 9: New England Patriots at Cleveland Browns – Game summary

Quarter	1	2	3	4	Total
Patriots	0	7	0	7	**14**
**Browns**	10	7	7	10	**34**

at Cleveland Browns Stadium, Cleveland, Ohio

- Date: November 7
- Game time: 1:00 p.m. EST
- Game weather: Sunny, 50 °F (10 °C)
- Game attendance: 66,292
- Referee: Clete Blakeman
- TV announcers (CBS): Bill Macatee and Rich Gannon
- Recap, Game Book

Game information

**First quarter**

- CLE – Phil Dawson 38-yard field goal, 11:49. Browns 3–0. **Drive: 6 plays, 42 yards, 3:11.**
- CLE – Peyton Hillis 2-yard run (Phil Dawson kick), 11:11. Browns 10–0. **Drive: 2 plays, 19 yards, 0:38.**

**Second quarter**

- NE – Aaron Hernandez 2-yard pass from Tom Brady (Stephen Gostkowski kick), 8:43. Browns 10–7. **Drive: 11 plays, 79 yards, 5:01.**
- CLE – Chansi Stuckey 11-yard run (Phil Dawson kick), 3:23. Browns 17–7. **Drive: 9 plays, 60 yards, 5:20.**

**Third quarter**

- CLE – Colt McCoy 16-yard run (Phil Dawson kick), 5:53. Browns 24–7. **Drive: 10 plays, 72 yards, 7:00.**

**Fourth quarter**

- CLE – Phil Dawson 37-yard field goal, 10:45. Browns 27–7. **Drive: 13 plays, 61 yards, 7:48.**
- NE – Aaron Hernandez 1-yard pass from Tom Brady (Stephen Gostkowski kick), 6:37. Browns 27–14. **Drive: 14 plays, 69 yards, 4:08.**
- CLE – Peyton Hillis 35-yard run (Phil Dawson kick), 2:38. Browns 34–14. **Drive: 6 plays, 60 yards, 3:59.**

**Top passers**

- NE – Tom Brady – 19/36, 224 yards, 2 TD
- CLE – Colt McCoy – 14/19, 174 yards

**Top rushers**

- NE – Danny Woodhead – 9 rushes, 54 yards
- CLE – Peyton Hillis – 29 rushes, 184 yards, 2 TD

**Top receivers**

- NE – Aaron Hernandez – 5 receptions, 48 yards, 2 TD
- CLE – Mohamed Massaquoi – 4 receptions, 58 yards

Coming off their bye week, the Browns went home for their Week 9 intraconference duel with the New England Patriots. Cleveland delivered the opening punch in the first quarter as kicker Phil Dawson hit a 38-yard field goal, followed by running back Peyton Hillis' 2-yard touchdown run. The Patriots answered in the second quarter as quarterback Tom Brady completed a 2-yard touchdown pass to tight end Aaron Hernandez. Cleveland struck back on a touchdown run by wide receiver Chansi Stuckey.

The Browns added onto their lead in the third quarter as rookie quarterback Colt McCoy got a 16-yard touchdown run. Cleveland continued to pull away in the fourth quarter with another Dawson field goal. New England tried to rally as Brady completed a 1-yard touchdown pass to Hernandez (with the extra point kicked by wide receiver Wes Welker), yet the Browns pulled away with Hillis' 35-yard touchdown run.

With their first win over the Patriots since 2000, Cleveland improved to 3–5. Hillis was named as the AFC Offensive Player of the Week. However, as of 2025, this remains the last time the Browns had defeated the Patriots.

==== Week 10: vs. New York Jets ====
Week 10: New York Jets at Cleveland Browns – Game summary

Quarter	1	2	3	4	OT	Total
**Jets**	3	14	0	3	6	**26**
Browns	10	3	0	7	0	**20**

at Cleveland Browns Stadium, Cleveland, Ohio

- Date: November 14
- Game time: 1:00 p.m. EST
- Game weather: Cloudy, 46 °F (8 °C)
- Game attendance: 67,449
- Referee: Terry McAulay
- TV announcers (CBS): Jim Nantz and Phil Simms
- Recap, Game Book

Game information

**First quarter**

- CLE – Phil Dawson 34-yard field goal, 9:52. Browns 3–0. **Drive: 11 plays, 69 yards, 5:08.**
- NYJ – Nick Folk 27-yard field goal, 5:52. Tied 3–3. **Drive: 9 plays, 33 yards, 4:00.**
- CLE – Peyton Hillis 12-yard run (Phil Dawson kick), 0:16. Browns 10–3. **Drive: 5 plays, 61 yards, 2:50.**

**Second quarter**

- NYJ – Jerricho Cotchery 25-yard pass from Mark Sanchez (Nick Folk kick), 11:09. Tied 10–10. **Drive: 9 plays, 76 yards, 4:07.**
- CLE – Phil Dawson 23-yard field goal, 5:13. Browns 13–10. **Drive: 10 plays, 66 yards, 5:56.**
- NYJ – Mark Sanchez 1-yard run (Nick Folk kick), 0:23. Jets 17–13. **Drive: 11 plays, 80 yards, 4:50.**

**Third quarter**

- No scoring plays.

**Fourth quarter**

- NYJ – Nick Folk 25-yard field goal, 2:42. Jets 20–13. **Drive: 13 plays, 56 yards, 7:45.**
- CLE – Mohamed Massaquoi 3-yard pass from Colt McCoy (Phil Dawson kick), 0:44. Tied 20–20. **Drive: 10 plays, 59 yards, 1:58.**

**Overtime**

- NYJ – Santonio Holmes 37-yard pass from Mark Sanchez, 0:16. Jets 26–20. **Drive: 1 play, 37 yards, 0:08.**

**Top passers**

- NYJ – Mark Sanchez – 27/44, 299 yards, 2 TD, INT
- CLE – Colt McCoy – 18/31, 205 yards, TD

**Top rushers**

- NYJ – Shonn Greene – 20 rushes, 72 yards
- CLE – Peyton Hillis – 19 rushes, 82 yards, TD

**Top receivers**

- NYJ – Santonio Holmes – 5 receptions, 76 yards, TD
- CLE – Benjamin Watson – 5 receptions, 74 yards

Coming off their win over the Patriots, the Browns stayed at home for a Week 10 duel with the New York Jets, in a game that marked head coach Eric Mangini coaching against his former team, former Browns WR Braylon Edwards making his first return to Cleveland since being traded, and Jets' head coach Rex Ryan coaching against his brother, Browns' defensive coordinator Rob Ryan. The two teams exchanged early field goals before the Browns scored with a 12-yard touchdown run from RB Peyton Hillis. In the Second quarter New York tied the game on a 25-yard pass from Mark Sanchez to WR Jerricho Cotchery. After A Browns' field goal, the Jets would take the lead for the first time with a Sanchez 1-yard touchdown run late in the first half.

The third quarter started with a Jets' drive that lasted 19 plays and almost 10 minutes, but resulting in no points as K Nick Folk missed a short field goal. The Jets added onto their lead in the fourth quarter with Folk making a 25-yard field goal. On the Browns' next drive, rookie QB Colt McCoy drove the team down the field and the Browns scored on a 3-yard touchdown pass to Mohamed Massaquoi, to tie the game at 20 and send it into overtime.

In overtime, both teams squandered chances to win: Browns WR Chansi Stuckey fumbled the ball in Jets' territory, Folk missed a field goal for the Jets, and Sanchez threw an interception near the goal line. It was the Jets who would finally break through late in the overtime period as Sanchez completed the game-winning 37-yard touchdown pass to WR Santonio Holmes with only 16 seconds left.

With the loss, Cleveland fell to 3–6.

==== Week 11: at Jacksonville Jaguars ====
Week 11: Cleveland Browns at Jacksonville Jaguars – Game summary

Quarter	1	2	3	4	Total
Browns	0	7	10	3	**20**
**Jaguars**	3	7	0	14	**24**

at EverBank Field, Jacksonville, Florida

- Date: November 21
- Game time: 1:00 p.m. EST
- Game weather: Sunny, 76 °F (24 °C)
- Game attendance: 62,254
- Referee: Pete Morelli
- TV announcers (CBS): Bill Macatee and Rich Gannon
- Recap, Game Book

Game information

**First quarter**

- JAC – Josh Scobee 47-yard field goal, 8:13. Jaguars 3–0. **Drive: 7 plays, 33 yards, 3:55.**

**Second quarter**

- CLE – Peyton Hillis 11-yard pass from Colt McCoy (Phil Dawson kick), 13:20. Browns 7–3. **Drive: 16 plays, 92 yards, 9:57.**
- JAC – Mike Thomas 5-yard pass from David Garrard (Josh Scobee kick), 0:35. Jaguars 10–7. **Drive: 13 plays, 68 yards, 4:53.**

**Third quarter**

- CLE – Abram Elam 18-yard fumble return (Phil Dawson kick), 11:26. Browns 14–10.
- CLE – Phil Dawson 38-yard field goal, 1:54. Browns 17–10. **Drive: 4 plays, −1 yards, 1:32.**

**Fourth quarter**

- JAC – Marcedes Lewis 14-yard pass from David Garrard (Josh Scobee kick), 3:41. Tied 17–17. **Drive: 12 plays, 59 yards, 6:13.**
- CLE – Phil Dawson 41-yard field goal, 2:51. Browns 20–17. **Drive: 8 plays, 57 yards, 0:48.**
- JAC – Maurice Jones-Drew 1-yard run (Josh Scobee kick), 1:20. Jaguars 24–20. **Drive: 5 plays, 87 yards, 1:30.**

**Top passers**

- CLE – Colt McCoy – 17/28, 241 yards, TD, INT
- JAC – David Garrard – 20/34, 254 yards, 2 TD, 3 INT

**Top rushers**

- CLE – Peyton Hillis – 21 rushes, 48 yards
- JAC – Maurice Jones-Drew – 23 rushes, 133 yards, TD

**Top receivers**

- CLE – Peyton Hillis – 6 receptions, 95 yards, TD
- JAC – Maurice Jones-Drew – 3 receptions, 87 yards

Coming off a last-second loss to the Jets, the Browns headed to Florida for their Week 11 duel with the Jacksonville Jaguars. The Jaguars struck first on a 47-yard field goal by Josh Scobee. In the second quarter, the Browns took the lead with an 11-yard pass from Colt McCoy to Peyton Hillis. But the Jaguars responded with David Garrard completing a 5-yard pass to Mike Thomas, and they took a 10–7 lead into halftime. In the third, the Jaguars turned the ball over on five straight possessions, but the Browns could only convert them into ten points, taking a 17–10 lead. In the fourth, Marcedes Lewis had a 14-yard touchdown reception, tying the game. The Browns retook the lead on a Phil Dawson field goal, but the Jaguars struck back with Maurice Jones-Drew running it in from a yard out. McCoy drove the Browns down the field, but Sean Considine intercepted his final pass, and the Jaguars defeated the Browns, 24–20.

With the loss, the Browns fell to 3–7.

==== Week 12: vs. Carolina Panthers ====
Week 12: Carolina Panthers at Cleveland Browns – Game summary

Quarter	1	2	3	4	Total
Panthers	7	6	7	3	**23**
**Browns**	14	7	0	3	**24**

at Cleveland Browns Stadium, Cleveland, Ohio

- Date: November 28
- Game time: 1:00 p.m. EST
- Game weather: Sunny, 42 °F (6 °C)
- Game attendance: 64,463
- Referee: Jeff Triplette
- TV announcers (Fox): Chris Rose and Torry Holt
- Recap, Game Book

Game information

**First quarter**

- CAR – Mike Goodson 26-yard run (John Kasay kick), 10:36. Panthers 7–0. **Drive: 9 plays, 81 yards, 4:24.**
- CLE – Peyton Hillis 9-yard run (Phil Dawson kick), 6:49. Tied 7–7. **Drive: 9 plays, 77 yards, 3:47.**
- CLE – Peyton Hillis 5-yard run (Phil Dawson kick), 2:44. Browns 14–7. **Drive: 7 plays, 64 yards, 3:04.**

**Second quarter**

- CLE – Peyton Hillis 6-yard run (Phil Dawson kick), 9:12. Browns 21–7. **Drive: 6 plays, 60 yards, 2:13.**
- CAR – John Kasay 43-yard field goal, 3:19. Browns 21–10. **Drive: 10 plays, 49 yards, 5:53.**
- CAR – John Kasay 42-yard field goal, 0:47. Browns 21–13. **Drive: 5 plays, 18 yards, 0:59.**

**Third quarter**

- CAR – Captain Munnerlyn 37-yard interception return (John Kasay kick), 12:18. Browns 21–20.

**Fourth quarter**

- CAR – John Kasay 43-yard field goal, 7:01. Panthers 23–21. **Drive: 9 plays, 51 yards, 4:32.**
- CLE – Phil Dawson 41-yard field goal, 2:42. Browns 24–23. **Drive: 9 plays, 46 yards, 4:19.**

**Top passers**

- CAR – Jimmy Clausen – 16/28, 195 yards, INT
- CLE – Jake Delhomme – 24/35, 245 yards, 2 INT

**Top rushers**

- CAR – Jonathan Stewart – 12 rushes, 98 yards
- CLE – Peyton Hillis – 26 rushes, 131 yards, 3 TD

**Top receveivers**

- CAR – Mike Goodson – 8 receptions, 81 yards
- CLE – Peyton Hillis – 6 receptions, 63 yards

The Browns returned home for a Week 12 duel with the Carolina Panthers after suffering back-to-back last-second losses. Jake Delhomme returned to quarterback for Cleveland against his former team after missing eight games with an ankle injury. The Panthers scored on their opening possession on a 26-yard run by Mike Goodson, but the Browns stormed back, with Peyton Hillis rushing for a touchdown on three consecutive possessions. Carolina added two field goals by John Kasay to end the half, and the Browns led 21–13. In the third quarter, the Browns' offense fell apart, failing to score and turning the ball over twice. Captain Munnerlyn returned an interception for a touchdown, pulling the Panthers within one. In the fourth quarter, Kasay hit a 43-yard field goal to give the Panthers the lead, but Phil Dawson returned the favor and put the Browns back on top. In the final minute, Panthers' QB Jimmy Clausen drove his team down the field, but Kasay's 42-yard field goal attempt hit the left upright as time expired, and the Browns held on to win, 24–23

With the win, the Browns improved to 4–7. This marked the Browns' first victory over the Panthers in franchise history, as the Browns lost each of the three previous meetings.

After the game, CB Joe Haden was named the Defensive Rookie of the Month for November. In four games during the month, Haden recorded 15 tackles, seven defended passes, and three interceptions. He became the first Browns' player to ever win this award.

==== Week 13: at Miami Dolphins ====
Week 13: Cleveland Browns at Miami Dolphins – Game summary

Quarter	1	2	3	4	Total
**Browns**	0	3	7	3	**13**
Dolphins	0	3	0	7	**10**

at Sun Life Stadium, Miami Gardens, Florida

- Date: December 5
- Game time: 1:00 p.m. EST
- Game weather: Clear, 76 °F (24 °C)
- Game attendance: 65,942
- Referee: Alberto Riveron
- TV announcers (CBS): Greg Gumbel and Dan Dierdorf
- Recap, Game Book

Game information

**First quarter**

- No scoring plays.

**Second quarter**

- CLE – Phil Dawson 32-yard field goal, 1:43. Browns 3–0. **Drive: 7 plays, 14 yards, 1:41**
- MIA – Dan Carpenter 60-yard field goal, 0:02. Tied 3–3. **Drive: 8 plays, 24 yards, 1:41**

**Third quarter**

- CLE – Benjamin Watson 3-yard pass from Jake Delhomme (Phil Dawson kick), 1:16. Browns 10–3. **Drive: 6 plays, 94 yards, 3:40**

**Fourth quarter**

- MIA – Anthony Fasano 11-yard pass from Chad Henne (Dan Carpenter kick), 10:27. Tied 10–10. **Drive: 11 plays, 80 yards, 5:49**
- CLE – Phil Dawson 23-yard field goal, 0:00. Browns 13–10. **Drive: 4 plays, −4 yards, 0:54**

**Top passers**

- CLE – Jake Delhomme – 24/34, 217 yards, TD
- MIA – Chad Henne – 16/32, 174 yards, TD, 3 INT

**Top rushers**

- CLE – Peyton Hillis – 18 rushes, 57 yards
- MIA – Ronnie Brown – 16 rushes, 50 yards

**Top receivers**

- CLE – Benjamin Watson – 10 receptions, 100 yards, TD
- MIA – Davone Bess – 6 receptions, 67 yards

The Browns, coming off a close victory over the Panthers, headed to Sun Life Stadium for their Week 13 battle against the Miami Dolphins. After a scoreless first quarter, the Browns scored first on a Phil Dawson 32-yard field goal. The Dolphins tied it at the half with Dan Carpenter hitting a 60-yard field goal, the longest in franchise history. In the second half, Benjamin Watson gave the Browns a 10–3 lead with a 3-yard touchdown reception from Jake Delhomme. The Dolphins responded with Chad Henne driving Miami down the field and tying the game with an 11-yard touchdown pass to Anthony Fasano. Late in the fourth quarter, Mike Adams intercepted Henne's pass and returned it to the 2. The Browns bled out the clock, and Dawson hit the game-winning field goal as time expired, giving the Browns a 13–10 victory.

With the win, the Browns improved to 5–7, matching their win total from the 2009 season.

==== Week 14: at Buffalo Bills ====
Week 14: Cleveland Browns at Buffalo Bills – Game summary

Quarter	1	2	3	4	Total
Browns	3	3	0	0	**6**
**Bills**	0	10	0	3	**13**

at Ralph Wilson Stadium, Orchard Park, New York

- Date: December 12
- Game time: 1:00 p.m. EST
- Game weather: Rain, 36 °F (2 °C)
- Game attendance: 50,861
- Referee: Scott Green
- TV announcers (CBS): Don Criqui and Steve Beuerlein
- Recap, Game Book

Game information

**First quarter**

- CLE – Phil Dawson 19-yard field goal, 10:11. Browns 3–0. **Drive: 9 plays, 54 yards, 4:49.**

**Second quarter**

- BUF – David Nelson 11-yard pass from Ryan Fitzpatrick (Rian Lindell kick), 9:28. Bills 7–3. **Drive: 14 plays, 89 yards, 8:14.**
- CLE – Phil Dawson 25-yard field goal, 3:52. Bills 7–6. **Drive: 11 plays, 73 yards, 5:36.**
- BUF – Rian Lindell 30-yard field goal, 0:14. Bills 10–6. **Drive: 9 plays, 63 yards, 3:38.**

**Third quarter**

- No scoring plays.

**Fourth quarter**

- BUF – Rian Lindell 19-yard field goal, 7:56. Bills 13–6. **Drive: 6 plays, 22 yards, 3:07.**

**Top passers**

- CLE – Jake Delhomme – 12/20, 86 yards, INT
- BUF – Ryan Fitzpatrick – 14/23, 142 yards, TD

**Top rushers**

- CLE – Peyton Hillis – 21 rushes, 108 yards
- BUF – Fred Jackson – 29 rushes, 112 yards

**Top receivers**

- CLE – Mohamed Massaquoi – 3 receptions, 43 yards
- BUF – Jonathan Stupar – 3 receptions, 45 yards

The Browns headed to New York to take on the Buffalo Bills for their Week 14 duel. It was a low-scoring affair due to the freezing rain pelting the field for much of the game. On their opening drive, the Browns drove down to the Bills' one-yard line but could not get into the end. Kicker Phil Dawson kicked a 19-yard field goal in the first quarter. In the second quarter, Ryan Fitzpatrick connected with David Nelson on an 11-yard pass for the game's only touchdown, giving the Bills a 7–3 lead. Dawson hit another field goal to pull the Browns within one, but a Rian Lindell 30-yard field goal gave the Bills a 10–6 lead at the half. Several turnovers in the second half stopped the Browns from making progress down the field, and another Lindell field goal in the fourth quarter sent the Browns to a 13–6 loss. The lone high point for the Browns was Peyton Hillis, who became the first white running back to rush for over 1,000 yards in a season in 25 years.

With the loss, the Browns fell to 5–8 and were eliminated from playoff contention. This marks the eighth consecutive season in which the Browns failed to make the playoffs, a franchise record.

==== Week 15: at Cincinnati Bengals ====
Week 15: Cleveland Browns at Cincinnati Bengals – Game summary

Quarter	1	2	3	4	Total
Browns	7	0	0	10	**17**
**Bengals**	0	10	6	3	**19**

at Paul Brown Stadium, Cincinnati, Ohio

- Date: December 19
- Game time: 1:00 p.m. EST
- Game weather: Partly cloudy, 28 °F (−2 °C)
- Game attendance: 56,342
- Referee: Jerome Boger
- TV announcers (CBS): Don Criqui and Steve Beuerlein (blacked out locally)
- Recap, Game Book

Game information

**First quarter**

- CLE – Robert Royal 20-yard pass from Colt McCoy (Phil Dawson kick), 12:08. Browns 7–0. **Drive: 6 plays, 75 yards, 2:52.**

**Second quarter**

- CIN – Cedric Benson 18-yard run (Clint Stitser kick), 12:52. Tied 7–7. **Drive: 10 plays, 91 yards, 6:15.**
- CIN – Clint Stitser 25-yard field goal, 4:19. Bengals 10–7. **Drive: 13 plays, 68 yards, 7:27.**

**Third quarter**

- CIN – Clint Stitser 39-yard field goal, 11:11. Bengals 13–7. **Drive: 8 plays, 39 yards, 3:49.**
- CIN – Clint Stitser 34-yard field goal, 3:33. Bengals 16–7. **Drive: 10 plays, 37 yards, 5:26.**

**Fourth quarter**

- CLE – Phil Dawson 23-yard field goal, 14:06. Bengals 16–10. **Drive: 9 plays, 61 yards, 4:27.**
- CIN – Clint Stitser 20-yard field goal, 9:58. Bengals 19–10. **Drive: 9 plays, 77 yards, 4:08.**
- CLE – Brian Robiskie 46-yard pass from Colt McCoy (Phil Dawson kick), 2:13. Bengals 19–17. **Drive: 5 plays, 88 yards, 1:53.**

**Top passers**

- CLE – Colt McCoy – 19/25, 243 yards, 2 TD
- CIN – Carson Palmer – 14/23, 209 yards

**Top rushers**

- CLE – Peyton Hillis – 14 rushes, 59 yards
- CIN – Cedric Benson – 31 rushes, 150 yards, TD

**Top receivers**

- CLE – Benjamin Watson – 7 receptions, 92 yards
- CIN – Andre Caldwell – 4 receptions, 89 yards

Colt McCoy returned for the Cleveland Browns' week 15 Battle of Ohio against the Cincinnati Bengals. The Browns scored on their opening drive on a 20-yard pass from McCoy to Robert Royal. The Bengals answered with Cedric Benson's 18-yard run to tie the game. Over the rest of the second and third quarters, Clint Stitser hit three field goals to give the Bengals a 16–7 lead. After trading field goals in the fourth, the Browns got within two on a 46-yard pass to Brian Robiskie. However, the Browns failed to stop a third down conversion on the Bengals' next possession, and the Browns lost 19–17.

With the loss, the Browns fell to 5–9 and finished the season 2–6 on the road.

==== Week 16: vs. Baltimore Ravens ====
Week 16: Baltimore Ravens at Cleveland Browns – Game summary

Quarter	1	2	3	4	Total
**Ravens**	0	13	7	0	**20**
Browns	7	3	0	0	**10**

at Cleveland Browns Stadium, Cleveland, Ohio

- Date: December 26
- Game time: 1:00 p.m. EST
- Game weather: Cloudy, 24 °F (−4 °C)
- Game attendance: 65,028
- Referee: John Parry
- TV announcers (CBS): Ian Eagle and Dan Fouts
- Recap, Game Book

Game information

**First quarter**

- CLE – Brian Robiskie 29-yard pass from Mohamed Massaquoi (Phil Dawson kick), 7:01. Browns 7–0. **Drive: 4 plays, 40 yards, 2:12.**

**Second quarter**

- BAL – Billy Cundiff 27-yard field goal, 13:35. Browns 7–3. **Drive: 16 plays, 80 yards, 8:26.**
- BAL – T. J. Houshmandzadeh 15-yard pass from Joe Flacco (Billy Cundiff kick), 11:47. Ravens 10–7. **Drive: 9 plays, 28 yards, 3:56.**
- BAL – Billy Cundiff 40-yard field goal, 4:06. Ravens 13–7. **Drive: 9 plays, 28 yards, 3:56.**
- CLE – Phil Dawson 30-yard field goal, 0:03. Ravens 13–10. **Drive: 10 plays, 50 yards, 4:03.**

**Third quarter**

- BAL – Derrick Mason 22-yard pass from Joe Flacco (Billy Cundiff kick), 13:30. Ravens 20–10. **Drive: 3 plays, 38 yards, 1:30.**

**Fourth quarter**

- No scoring plays.

**Top passers**

- BAL – Joe Flacco – 12/19, 102 yards, 2 TD, INT
- CLE – Colt McCoy – 15/29, 149 yards, 3 INT

**Top rushers**

- BAL – Ray Rice – 25 rushes, 92 yards
- CLE – Peyton Hillis – 12 rushes, 35 yards

**Top receivers**

- BAL – Derrick Mason – 4 receptions, 50 yards, TD
- CLE – Mike Bell – 2 receptions, 48 yards

The Browns stayed home for their Week 16 AFC North battle with the Baltimore Ravens. The Browns scored first on a touchdown pass from wide receiver Mohamed Massaquoi to wide receiver Brian Robiskie. In the second quarter, the Ravens stormed back, with two field goals by Billy Cundiff and a touchdown pass from Joe Flacco to T. J. Houshmandzadeh. Phil Dawson hit a field goal late in the quarter to send the Browns into halftime down 13–10. The Browns opened the second half with a failed onside kick, which led to a Derrick Mason touchdown reception, and the Browns lost 20–10.

With the loss, the Browns fell to 5–10.

==== Week 17: vs. Pittsburgh Steelers ====
Week 17: Pittsburgh Steelers at Cleveland Browns – Game summary

Quarter	1	2	3	4	Total
**Steelers**	14	17	7	3	**41**
Browns	0	3	0	6	**9**

at Cleveland Browns Stadium, Cleveland, Ohio

- Date: January 2
- Game time: 1:00 p.m. EST
- Game weather: Sunny, 27 °F (−3 °C)
- Game attendance: 68,303
- Referee: Ron Winter
- TV announcers (CBS): Ian Eagle and Dan Fouts
- Recap, Game Book

Game information

**First quarter**

- PIT – Mike Wallace 56-yard pass from Ben Roethlisberger (Shaun Suisham kick), 14:17. Steelers 7–0. **Drive: 1 play, 56 yards, 0:08.**
- PIT – Rashard Mendenhall 1-yard run (Shaun Suisham kick), 6:57. Steelers 14–0. **Drive: 10 plays, 71 yards, 4:38.**

**Second quarter**

- CLE – Phil Dawson 19-yard field goal, 14:43. Steelers 14–3. **Drive: 15 plays, 80 yards, 7:14.**
- PIT – Rashard Mendenhall 1-yard run (Shaun Suisham kick), 7:51. Steelers 21–3. **Drive: 11 plays, 74 yards, 6:52.**
- PIT – Heath Miller 4-yard pass from Ben Roethlisberger (Shaun Suisham kick), 4:53. Steelers 28–3. **Drive: 3 plays, 24 yards, 1:35.**
- PIT – Shaun Suisham 41-yard field goal, 1:30. Steelers 31–3. **Drive: 7 plays, 53 yards, 1:03.**

**Third quarter**

- PIT – Hines Ward 3-yard pass from Antwaan Randle El (Shaun Suisham kick), 7:18. Steelers 38–3. **Drive: 13 plays, 77 yards, 7:42.**

**Fourth quarter**

- PIT – Shaun Suisham 24-yard field goal, 12:32. Steelers 41–3. **Drive: 10 plays, 52 yards, 4:56.**
- CLE – Brian Robiskie 20-yard pass from Colt McCoy (pass failed), 6:33. Steelers 41–9. **Drive: 12 plays, 88 yards, 5:59.**

**Top passers**

- PIT – Ben Roethlisberger – 15/22, 280 yards, TD
- CLE – Colt McCoy – 20/41, 209 yards, TD, 3 INT

**Top rushers**

- PIT – Rashard Mendenhall – 14 rushes, 36 yards, 2 TD
- CLE – Colt McCoy – 4 rushes, 19 yards

**Top receivers**

- PIT – Mike Wallace – 3 receptions, 105 yards, TD
- CLE – Benjamin Watson – 7 receptions, 67 yards

Hoping to close out their season on a positive note, the Browns stayed at home for a Week 17 AFC North rematch with the Pittsburgh Steelers. Cleveland trailed early in the first quarter as Steelers quarterback Ben Roethlisberger threw a 56-yard touchdown pass to wide receiver Mike Wallace, followed by running back Rashard Mendenhall getting a 1-yard touchdown run. The Browns answered in the second quarter with a 19-yard field goal from kicker Phil Dawson, but Pittsburgh struck back with Mendenhall's 1-yard touchdown run, followed by Roethlisberger's 4-yard touchdown pass to tight end Heath Miller, and kicker Shaun Suisham booting a 41-yard field goal.

The Steelers would add onto their lead in the third quarter as wide receiver Antwaan Randle El completed a 3-yard touchdown pass to wide receiver Hines Ward. Afterwards, Pittsburgh closed out its dominating day in the fourth quarter with Suisham making a 24-yard field goal. Cleveland would close out the game with rookie quarterback Colt McCoy finding wide receiver Brian Robiskie on a 20-yard touchdown pass, sending the Browns to their worst loss of the season, 41–9.

With the loss, the Browns closed out their season at 5–11, matching their 2009 record. They were 3–5 at home.

==== Mangini fired ====
The day after the season ended, team president Mike Holmgren fired head coach Eric Mangini after going 10–22 in two seasons.

== 2011 Pro Bowl ==
Despite the team's poor performance, offensive tackle Joe Thomas and center Alex Mack were named to the AFC roster in the 2011 Pro Bowl. Thomas, who was making his fourth consecutive Pro Bowl appearance, was the team's starting left tackle. Mack was originally selected as the second alternate at center, but was placed on the team after an injury to Nick Mangold of the New York Jets and Maurkice Pouncey of the Pittsburgh Steelers not being able to play because of the Steelers playing in Super Bowl XLV the following week.

In addition to Thomas and Mack, six Browns' players were named as alternates: RB Peyton Hillis and G Eric Steinbach were named as second alternates; KR Josh Cribbs, ST Ray Ventrone and FB Lawrence Vickers third alternates; and CB Joe Haden a fourth alternate at their respective positions.
