= Benjamin Watson =

American football player (born 1980)

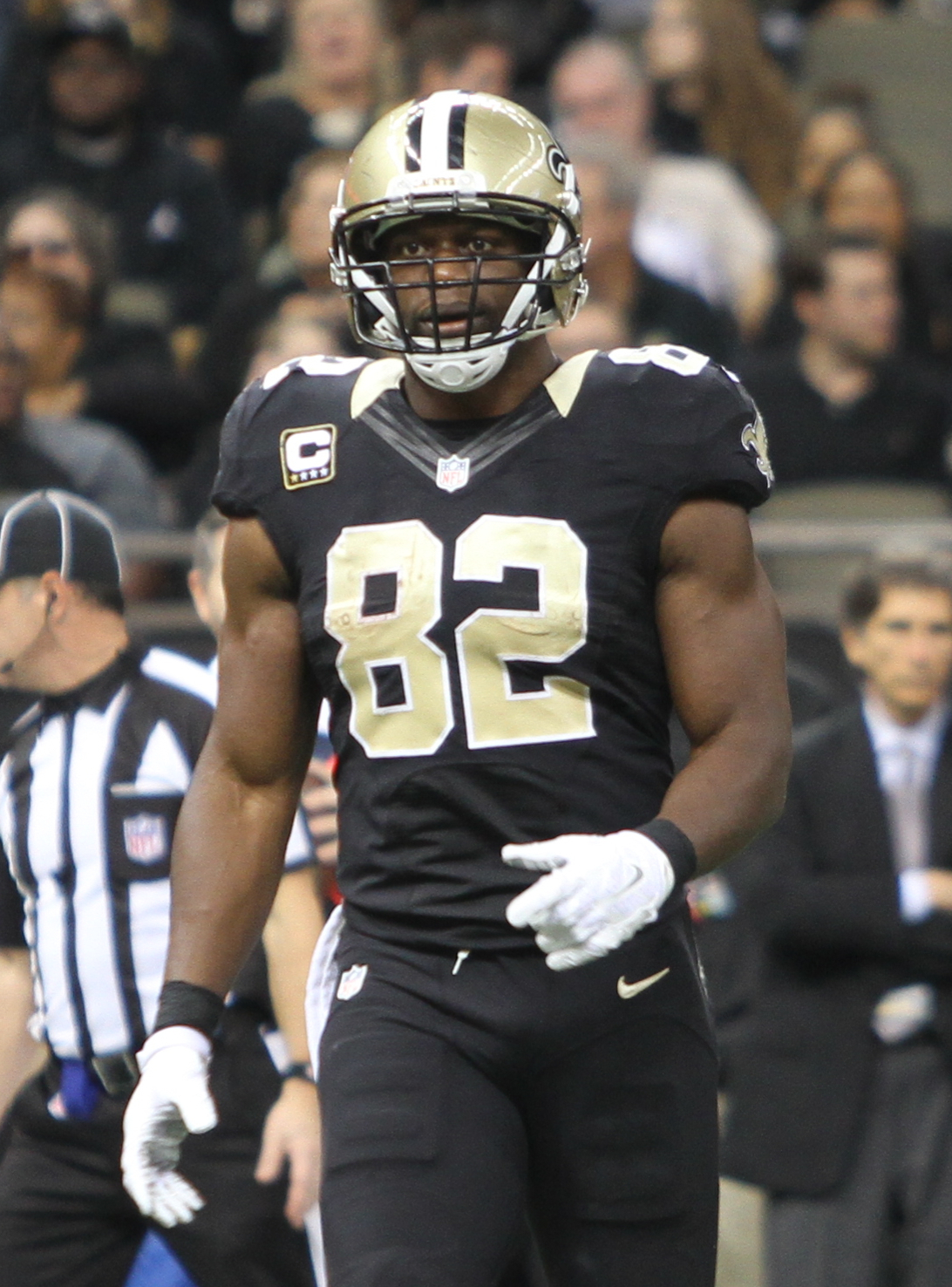
- Watson with the New Orleans Saints in 2015

No. 82, 84
- Position: Tight end

Personal information
- Born: December 18, 1980 (age 45); Norfolk, Virginia, U.S.
- Listed height: 6 ft 3 in (1.91 m)
- Listed weight: 255 lb (116 kg)

Career information
- High school: Northwestern (Rock Hill, South Carolina)
- College: Duke (1999); Georgia (2001–2003)
- NFL draft: 2004: 1st round, 32nd overall pick

Career history
- New England Patriots (2004–2009); Cleveland Browns (2010–2012); New Orleans Saints (2013–2015); Baltimore Ravens (2016–2017); New Orleans Saints (2018); New England Patriots (2019)

Awards and highlights
- Super Bowl champion (XXXIX); Second-team All-SEC (2003)

Career NFL statistics
- Receptions: 547
- Receiving yards: 6,058
- Rushing yards: 10
- Receiving touchdowns: 44
- Stats at Pro Football Reference

Benjamin Seth Watson (born December 18, 1980) is an American former professional football player who was a tight end in the National Football League (NFL). He played college football for the Duke Blue Devils and Georgia Bulldogs. Watson was selected by the New England Patriots with the 32nd overall pick in the first round of the 2004 NFL draft and won Super Bowl XXXIX with the Patriots in his rookie year. He also played in the NFL for the Cleveland Browns, Baltimore Ravens, and New Orleans Saints.

== Early life ==
Watson was born in Norfolk, Virginia. He attended Northwestern High School in Rock Hill, South Carolina, and was a letterman in football and track. In football, as a senior, he caught 31 passes for 515 yards. The two-time All-Region selection and Northwestern HS Student of the Year led his team to the state championship in his junior season. He was also a member of his high school chapter of The Fellowship of Christian Athletes.

In track and field, Watson was a standout sprinter, recording personal-best times of 22.37 seconds in the 200 meters and 50.03 seconds in the 400 meters.

== College career ==
Watson played football at Duke University prior to transferring to the University of Georgia where he majored in finance. In 3 seasons at Georgia, he had 65 catches for 852 yards and 6 TD.

== Professional career ==
=== Pre-draft ===
Watson attended the NFL combine and completed all of the combine and positional drills. He scored a 48 on the Wonderlic test, tying for the third highest score of any player in league history. On March 18, 2004, Watson participated at Georgia's pro day, but chose to stand on his combine numbers and only performed positional drills and the 40-yard dash. Team representatives and scouts from every team attended, including head coaches Mike Sherman (Packers) and Butch Davis (Browns). His overall performance impressed scouts and solidified his position as a top tight end in the draft. At the conclusion of the pre-draft process, Watson was projected to a second round pick by NFL draft experts and scouts. He was ranked the third best tight end prospect in the draft by DraftScout.com.

Pre-draft measurables
Height	Weight	Arm length	Hand span	40-yard dash	10-yard split	20-yard split	20-yard shuttle	Three-cone drill	Vertical jump	Broad jump	Bench press	Wonderlic
6 ft 3 1/2 in (1.92 m)	258 lb (117 kg)	32 3/4 in (0.83 m)	10 1/8 in (0.26 m)	4.53 s	1.61 s	2.68 s	4.11 s	7.38 s	35.5 in (0.90 m)	10 ft 3 in (3.12 m)	34 reps	48
All values from NFL Combine

=== New England Patriots (first stint) ===
==== 2004 season ====
The New England Patriots selected Watson in the first round (32nd overall) of the 2004 NFL draft. Watson was the second tight end drafted in 2004, after Miami's Kellen Winslow II (seventh overall).

Watson held out of training camp and missed 18 days due to a contract dispute. On August 14, 2004, Watson fired his agent Tom Condon, but was contractually obligated to retain IMG as his representative. On August 16, 2004, the New England Patriots signed Watson to a six-year, $13.50 million contract that included a signing bonus of $3.81 million.

Throughout training camp, Watson competed against Daniel Graham to be the starting tight end. Head coach Bill Belichick officially named Watson the starting tight end to begin the regular season in 2004. He made his NFL debut and first start in the Patriots' season-opener against the Indianapolis Colts and caught two passes for 16 yards in their 27–24 win, but was inactive for the Patriots' Week 2 win at the Arizona Cardinals and was placed on injured reserve for the rest of the season due to a knee injury. During his absence, the New England Patriots finished first in the AFC East with a 14–2 record and reached the Super Bowl after defeating the Colts 20–3 in the AFC Divisional Round and the Pittsburgh Steelers 41–27 in the AFC Championship Game. Watson received a Super Bowl ring after the Patriots defeated the Philadelphia Eagles 24–21 in Super Bowl XXXIX.

==== 2005 season ====
Watson returned as the Patriots' primary starting tight end in 2005. On October 9, 2005, Watson scored his first NFL touchdown off of a 33-yard pass by quarterback Tom Brady as the Patriots defeated the Atlanta Falcons 31–28 in Week 5. In Week 11, he caught a season-high four passes for 66 receiving yards during a 24–17 victory against the New Orleans Saints. On December 11, 2005, Watson caught three passes for 35-yards before exiting in the fourth quarter of the Patriots' 35–7 victory at the Buffalo Bills after suffering a concussion. He remained inactive for their Week 15 victory against the Tampa Bay Buccaneers. Watson finished the 2005 season with 29 receptions, 441 receiving yards, and four touchdown receptions in 15 games and nine starts.

The Patriots finished the 2005 season atop the AFC East with a 10–6 record and qualified for the playoffs. On January 7, 2006, Watson started his first career playoff game and recorded five receptions for 91 yards and scored on a 63-yard touchdown reception as the Patriots defeated the Jacksonville Jaguars in the AFC Wildcard Game. The following week, they were eliminated during a 27–13 loss at the Denver Broncos in the AFC Divisional Round. During the game, Watson ran the distance of the football field to catch and tackle Champ Bailey at the Broncos' one-yard line after an interception in the Patriots' end zone, preventing a touchdown. The play has been called "one of the greatest forgotten plays in Patriots history."

==== 2006 season ====
Watson entered the season as the Patriots' starting tight end. On October 30, 2006, Watson caught a season-high seven passes for 95-yards and a touchdown during a 31–7 win at the Minnesota Vikings in Week 8. In Week 14, he sustained a knee injury during a 21–0 loss at the Miami Dolphins and was sidelined for the last three games of the season (Weeks 15–17).

He finished the 2006 season with 49 receptions for 643 receiving yards and three touchdowns in 13 regular season games and 13 starts.

The Patriots finished first in the AFC East with a 12–4 record and reached the AFC Championship before losing at the Indianapolis Colts 38–34. During that game, Watson caught five passes for 48 yards, his best performance of the playoffs.

==== 2007 season ====
Watson remained the primary starting tight end for the Patriots in 2007. On October 7, 2007, Watson caught six passes for a season-high 107 receiving yards and two touchdowns during a 34–17 win against the Cleveland Browns in Week 5. This became Watson's first multi-touchdown performance and first game with over 100 receiving yards. Watson sustained an ankle injury and was inactive for two games (Weeks 7–8). During his absence he was replaced by Kyle Brady. Watson was inactive for another two games (Weeks 15–16) after aggravating his sprained ankle.

Watson finished the 2007 season with 38 receptions for 389 receiving yards and a career-high six touchdown receptions. The Patriots finished atop the AFC with a 16–0 record. On January 12, 2008, Watson caught two passes for 12-yards and two touchdowns in the Patriots' 31–20 win against Jacksonville Jaguars in the AFC Divisional Round. They reached the Super Bowl after defeating the San Diego Chargers 21–12 in the AFC Championship Game. On February 2, 2008, Watson started in Super Bowl XLII, but was held without a reception as the Patriots lost 17–14 to the New York Giants.

==== 2008 season ====
Watson again started at tight end for the Patriots in 2008. Watson sustained a knee injury during the preseason and was sidelined for the first two regular season games (Weeks 1–2). On November 13, 2008, Watson caught a season-high eight receptions for 88-yards and a touchdown during the Patriots' 34–31 loss to the New York Jets in Week 11.

Watson finished the season with 22 receptions, 229 receiving yards, and 2 touchdowns in 14 games and nine starts. Watson's performance was limited, in part, due to an injury to Tom Brady that sidelined him for the entire season. With Brady sidelined with a torn ACL, the Patriots started backup Matt Cassel and finished with an 11–5 record, but did not qualify for the playoffs.

==== 2009 season ====
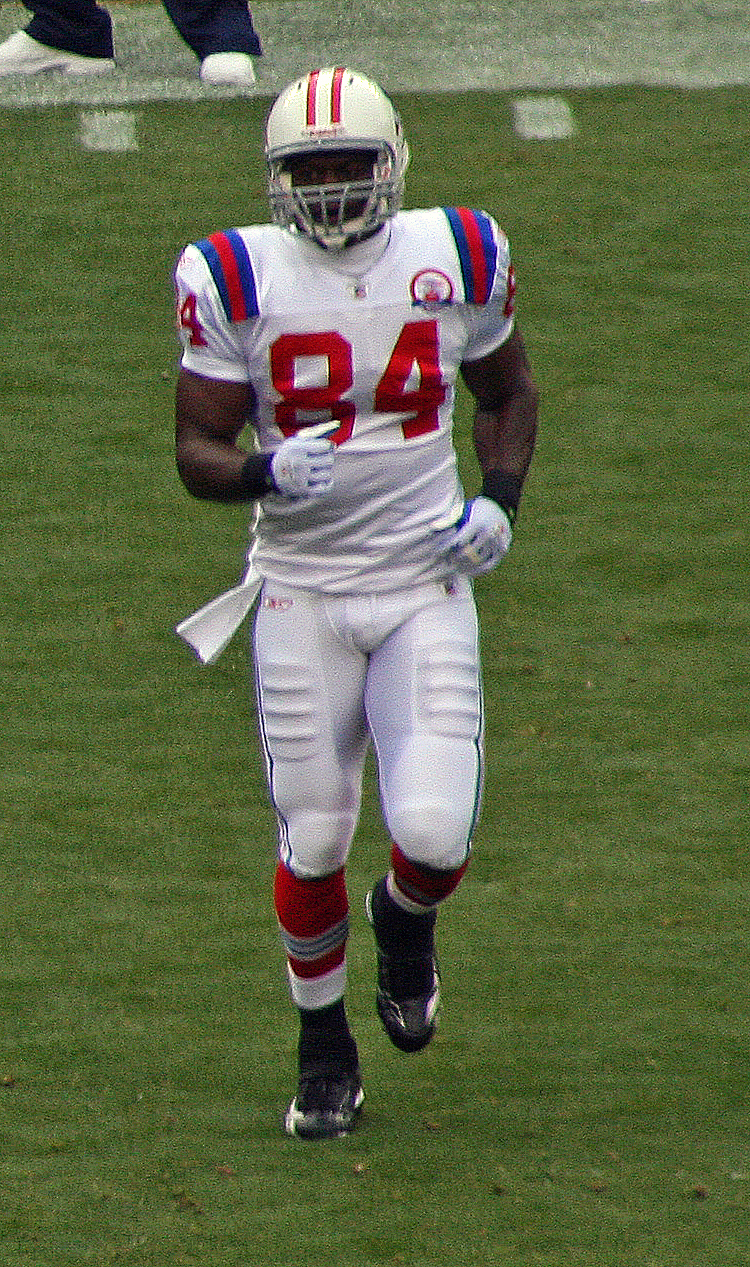
Watson in 2009

Watson retained his role as the primary Patriots tight end and became the only returning tight end after the Patriots released David Thomas and signed free agents Chris Baker and Michael Matthews. He started the Patriots' season-opener against the Buffalo Bills and recorded a season-high six receptions for 77-yards and caught two touchdown passes during a 25–24 victory.

He finished the 2009 season with 29 receptions for 404 receiving yards and five touchdowns in 16 games and seven starts. The Patriots finished atop the AFC East with a 10–6 record but lost in the first round of the playoffs, 33–14 to the Baltimore Ravens.

Watson became an unrestricted free agent for the first time in 2010.

On March 12, 2010, the Cleveland Browns signed Watson to a three-year, $12 million contract with $6.35 million guaranteed. He was reunited with Cleveland Browns' head coach Eric Mangini and offensive coordinator Brian Daboll. Mangini had been the Patriots' defensive coordinator in 2006 and Daboll had been their wide receiver coach from 2002 to 2006.

=== Cleveland Browns ===
==== 2010 season ====
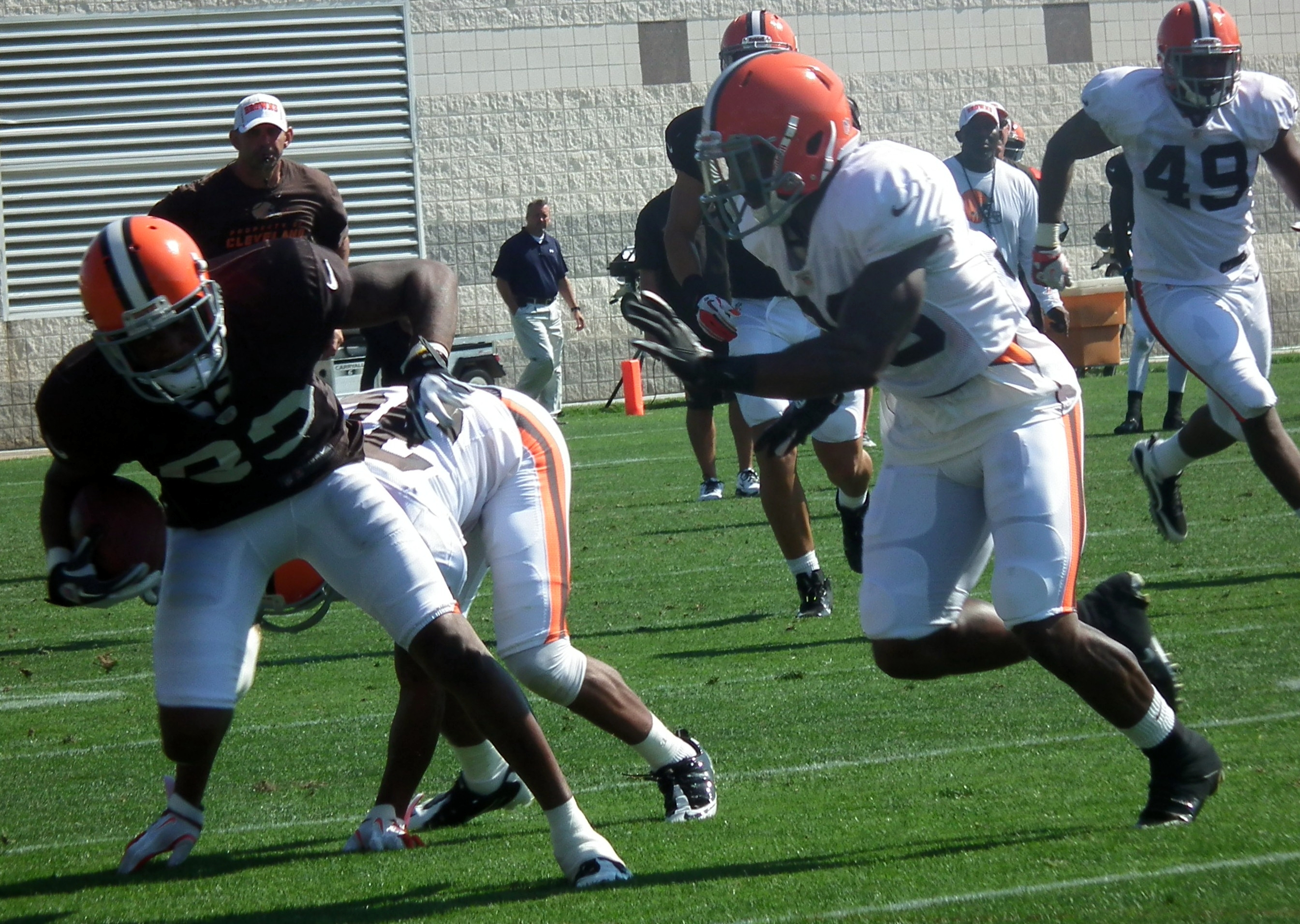
Watson (far left) in Browns training camp in 2012

Watson started for the Browns throughout the 2010 season. On September 26, 2010, Watson caught five passes for 47-yards and scored his first touchdown as a member of the Browns during a 24–17 loss at the Baltimore Ravens. On December 5, 2010, Watson recorded a season-high ten receptions for 100 receiving yards and a touchdown in the Browns' 13–10 win at the Miami Dolphins in Week 13. It marked his first game with double-digit receptions. Watson started in all 16 games for the first time in his career in 2010 and recorded 68 receptions for 763 receiving yards and three touchdown receptions. Watson led the team in receptions, receiving yards, and tied wide receiver Brian Robiskie for most receiving touchdowns.

==== 2011 season ====
The Browns fired head coach Eric Mangini and his staff after the Browns finished with a 5–11 record in 2010. On July 30, 2011, Watson suffered a concussion after taking an inadvertent knee to the helmet during the Browns' first practice in training camp. Head coach Pat Shurmur retained Watson as the No. 1 starting tight end on the Browns' depth chart to begin the regular season. On September 25, 2011, he recorded five receptions for a season-high 64-yards during a 17–16 win against the Miami Dolphins in Week 3. The following week, Watson caught a season-high six passes for 48 receiving yards and a touchdown as the Browns lost to the Tennessee Titans 31–13. On October 23, 2011, Watson exited the Browns' 6–3 victory against the Seattle Seahawks at the beginning of the third quarter due to a concussion. In Week 14, he caught two passes for 11-yards, but suffered his third concussion of the season and exited in the second quarter of a 14–3 loss at the Pittsburgh Steelers. On December 16, 2011, the Cleveland Browns officially placed Watson on injured reserve, and he missed the remaining three games of the regular season after being evaluated by a head trauma specialist.

Watson finished the 2011 season with a total of 37 receptions for 410 receiving yards and two touchdowns in 13 games and 11 starts.

==== 2012 season ====
Watson started for the Browns throughout the 2012 season. In Week 11, Watson recorded four receptions for 47-yards and caught a season-high two touchdown passes in a 23–20 overtime loss at the Dallas Cowboys. On December 2, 2012, he caught six passes for a season-high 80 receiving yards during a 20–17 win at the Oakland Raiders in Week 13. In Week 17, he collected a season-high seven receptions for 64-yards as the Browns lost 24–10 at the Pittsburgh Steelers.

Watson completed the 2012 season with 48 receptions for 501 receiving yards and three touchdowns in 16 games and 14 starts.

=== New Orleans Saints (first stint) ===
==== 2013 season ====
On March 18, 2013, the New Orleans Saints signed Watson to a three-year, $4.95 million contract with $1.80 guaranteed and a signing bonus of $1.20 million.

Watson entered the Saints training camp slated as a backup for the first time in his career. Playing behind Jimmy Graham, Watson caught his first touchdown as a member of the Saints in week four on a four-yard pass by quarterback Drew Brees during a 38–17 win against the Miami Dolphins. On October 13, 2013, he collected three receptions for a season-high 61 receiving yards during a 30–27 loss at the New England Patriots. He was inserted in the starting lineup against the Patriots due to an injury to Jimmy Graham. In Week 10, Watson sustained a concussion in the Saints' 49–17 win against the Dallas Cowboys. He remained inactive for their Week 11 victory against the San Francisco 49ers.

Watson finished his first season with the Saints with 19 receptions for 226 receiving yards and two touchdowns in 15 games and seven starts.

==== 2014 season ====
Watson returned as the Saints' secondary receiving tight end option behind Jimmy Graham in 2014. On October 5, 2014, Watson recorded a season-high five receptions for 43-yards during a 37–31 victory against the Tampa Bay Buccaneers in Week 5. In Week 13, he caught a season-long 15-yard pass from Drew Brees in the Saints' 35–32 victory at the Pittsburgh Steelers. Watson finished the season with 20 receptions for 136 receiving yards and two touchdowns in 16 games and eight starts.

==== 2015 season ====
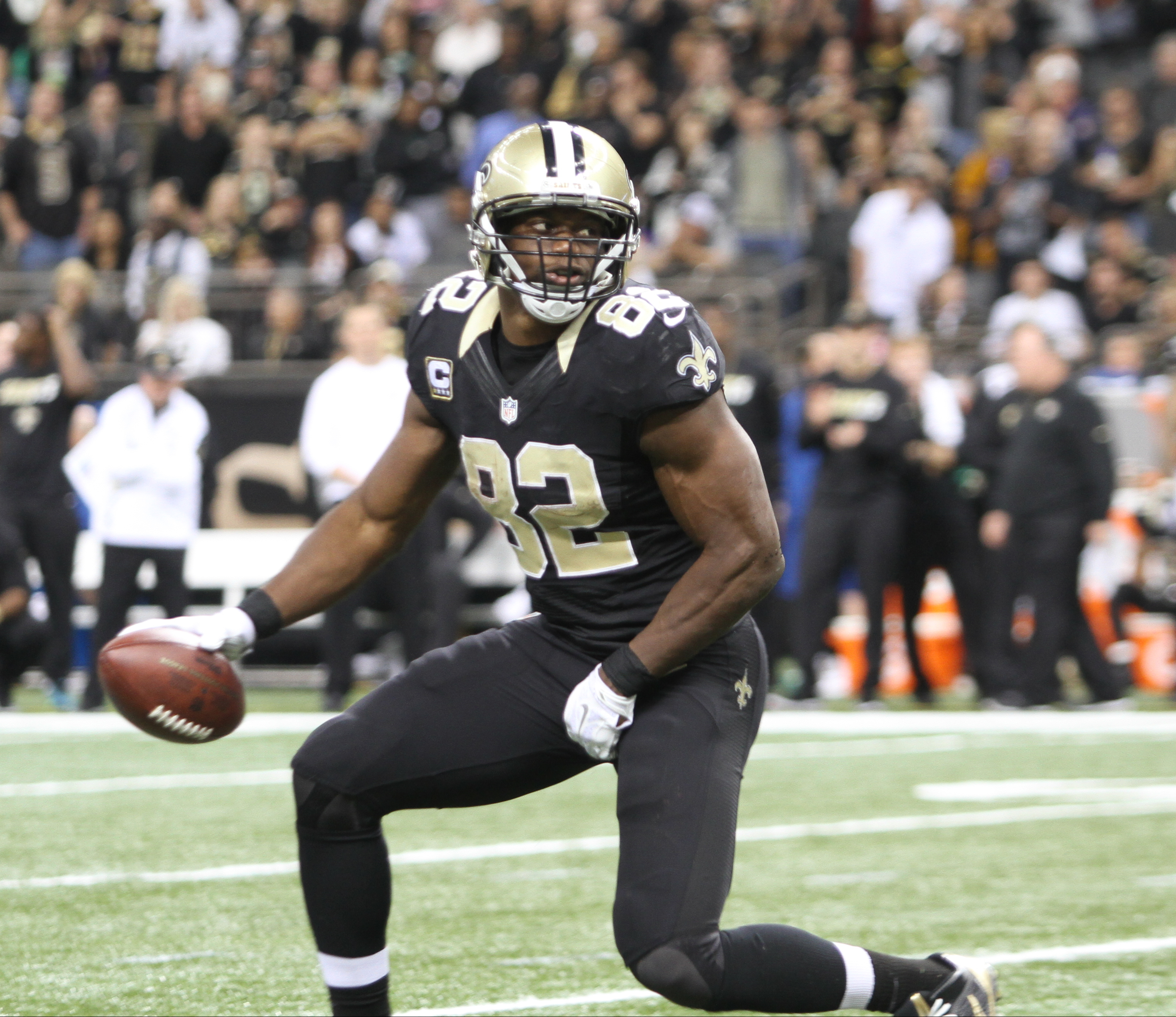
Watson playing for the Saints in 2015.

Watson entered the Saints season as the starting tight end after the departure of Jimmy Graham. Entering the season, Watson was elected an offensive team captain.

In Week 6, Watson caught ten passes for 127-yards and a touchdown during a 31–21 victory against the Atlanta Falcons. Writing about that game on Thursday Night Football, one columnist wrote, "it should forever be remembered as The Ben Watson Game, as the 12-year veteran did his best Jimmy Graham impression with 10 catches and 127 yards and a touchdown. It was cool to watch one of the league's longtime good guys put up a random career game in his 12th season."

On November 1, 2015, Watson recorded nine receptions for a season-high 147 receiving yards and a touchdown in the Saints' 52–49 win against the New York Giants in Week 8. Watson started in all 16 games in 2015 and caught a career-high 74 passes for 825 receiving yards and six touchdowns.

At the conclusion of the 2015 season, Watson was recognized as one of three finalists (with Eli Manning and Anquan Boldin (winner)) for the Walter Payton NFL Man of the Year Award, honoring a player's volunteer and charity work as well as excellence on the field, and was named an alternate to the Pro Bowl.

=== Baltimore Ravens ===
==== 2016 season ====
On March 9, 2016, the Baltimore Ravens signed Watson to a two-year, $7 million contract with $3 million guaranteed and a signing bonus of $2 million.

Throughout training camp, Watson competed to be the starting tight end against Crockett Gillmore, Dennis Pitta, and Maxx Williams. On August 27, 2016, during the Ravens' third preseason game, he suffered a torn Achilles tendon, ending his season.

==== 2017 season ====
During training camp, Watson competed to be the starting tight end against Crockett Gillmore, Nick Boyle, and Maxx Williams. Head coach John Harbaugh named Watson the backup tight end on the depth chart to begin the regular season, behind Nick Boyle. In Week 2, he recorded a season-high eight receptions for 91-yards during the Ravens' 21–10 victory against the Cleveland Browns. On December 17, 2017, Watson caught four passes for 74 receiving yards and caught a 33-yard touchdown pass during a 27–10 win at the Cleveland Browns in Week 15. Watson finished the 2017 season with 61 receptions for 522 receiving yards and four touchdowns in 16 games and 12 starts. On January 21, 2018, Watson was once again named a finalist for the Walter Payton Man of the Year Award (won by J. J. Watt) and later received the Bart Starr Award.

=== New Orleans Saints (second stint) ===
Watson became an unrestricted free agent after completing his two-year contract with the Baltimore Ravens.

On March 28, 2018, the Saints signed Watson to a one-year, $2 million contract that includes a signing bonus of $645,000. On October 21, 2018, Watson caught Drew Brees' 500th career touchdown pass in a 24–23 win over the Baltimore Ravens.

That season, Watson won the Bart Starr Award as the NFL player who "best exemplifies outstanding character and leadership in the home, on the field, and in the community."

On December 27, 2018, Watson announced that he would be retiring after 15 seasons in the NFL.

=== New England Patriots (second stint) ===
On May 10, 2019, Watson came out of retirement and signed with the Patriots, the team that had originally drafted him back in 2004.

On May 27, 2019, Watson announced that he had failed a test for performance-enhancing drugs. In March, during his retirement, his physician had prescribed a testosterone supplement. The NFL responded by suspending Watson for the season's first four games. Watson made his 2019 debut on October 21 in a Monday Night Football matchup against the rival New York Jets which the Patriots won 33–0. He recorded three catches for 18 yards. Against the Tennessee Titans in the Wild Card round, Watson recorded 3 catches for 38 yards as the Patriots lost 20–13.

Watson announced his second retirement from football on March 16, 2020.

== Career statistics ==
=== NFL ===
Legend
	Won the Super Bowl
**Bold**	Career high

==== Regular season ====
Year	Team	Games		Receiving					Rushing					Fumbles	
Year	Team	GP	GS	Rec	Yds	Avg	Lng	TD	Att	Yds	Avg	Lng	TD	Fum	Lost
2004	NE	1	1	2	16	8.0	14	0	—	—	—	—	—	0	0
2005	NE	15	9	29	441	**15.2**	35	4	—	—	—	—	—	1	**1**
2006	NE	13	13	49	643	13.1	40	3	—	—	—	—	—	**3**	**1**
2007	NE	12	8	36	389	10.8	35	**6**	**1**	**11**	**11.0**	**11**	0	1	0
2008	NE	14	9	22	209	9.5	29	2	—	—	—	—	—	1	**1**
2009	NE	**16**	7	29	404	13.9	36	5	—	—	—	—	—	1	**1**
2010	CLE	**16**	**16**	68	763	11.2	44	3	**1**	-1	-1.0	-1	0	0	0
2011	CLE	13	11	37	410	11.1	34	2	—	—	—	—	—	0	0
2012	CLE	**16**	14	49	501	10.2	27	3	—	—	—	—	—	1	0
2013	NO	15	7	19	226	11.9	32	2	—	—	—	—	—	0	0
2014	NO	**16**	8	20	136	6.8	15	2	—	—	—	—	—	0	0
2015	NO	**16**	**16**	**74**	**825**	11.1	**46**	**6**	—	—	—	—	—	1	**1**
2016	BAL	0	0	Did not play due to injury											
2017	BAL	**16**	12	61	522	8.6	33	4	—	—	—	—	—	1	0
2018	NO	**16**	4	35	400	11.4	32	2	—	—	—	—	—	0	0
2019	NE	10	8	17	173	10.2	26	0	—	—	—	—	—	0	0
Career		205	143	547	6,058	11.1	46	44	2	10	5.0	11	0	9	5

==== Postseason ====
Year	Team	Games		Receiving					Rushing					Fumbles	
Year	Team	GP	GS	Rec	Yds	Avg	Lng	TD	Att	Yds	Avg	Lng	TD	Fum	Lost
2004	NE	0	0	Did not play due to injury											
2005	NE	2	2	5	**91**	**18.2**	**63**	1	—	—	—	—	—	**1**	0
2006	NE	**3**	2	**10**	81	8.1	19	0	—	—	—	—	—	0	0
2007	NE	**3**	**3**	3	20	6.7	9	**2**	—	—	—	—	—	0	0
2009	NE	1	0	1	3	3.0	3	0	—	—	—	—	—	0	0
2013	NO	2	2	2	27	13.5	27	0	—	—	—	—	—	0	0
2018	NO	1	0	1	12	12.0	12	0	—	—	—	—	—	0	0
2019	NE	1	0	3	38	12.7	21	0	—	—	—	—	—	0	0
Career		13	9	25	272	10.9	63	3	0	0	0.0	0	0	1	0

=== College ===
Season	Receiving			
Season	Rec	Yds	Avg	TD
1999	8	93	11.6	1
2001	11	187	17.0	1
2002	31	341	11.0	3
2003	23	324	14.1	2
Career	73	945	12.9	7

== Personal life ==
Watson is married to Kirsten Vaughn Watson, who grew up in Baton Rouge. Vaughn was a multisport athlete at Episcopal High School. Her grandfather, Isaac Greggs, was the longtime band director at Southern University. Her father Percy Vaughn, is from New Orleans and a Southern University graduate. Her mom, Audree, attended Louisiana State University.

Vaughn and Watson married in 2005 after his rookie NFL year. Together they have seven children, including one set of twins. In 2013, Watson said he became a Christian at the age of five or six.

Benjamin has a younger brother, Asa, who was signed by the New England Patriots on May 10, 2014, but was released before the season started.

Following the events in Ferguson, Missouri, Watson wrote a Facebook post on the issue of race in America that was "liked" on Facebook more than 850,000 times. The post received national attention.

On November 17, 2015, Watson released a book, Under Our Skin: Getting Real About Race--And Getting Free From the Fears and Frustrations That Divide Us, with Tyndale House Publishers.

Watson opposes abortion and spoke at the March for Life in 2017 and 2024. In 2020, he executive produced and partially financed a movie called Divided Hearts of America on the topic of abortion featuring former Presidential candidate Ben Carson and niece of Martin Luther King Jr., Alveda King.

In 2018, Watson won the Bart Starr Award as the NFL player who "best exemplifies outstanding character and leadership in the home, on the field, and in the community."

Beginning in 2021, Watson serves as a college football studio analyst for the SEC Network of ESPN appearing as a staple on the network's SEC Now and SEC Football Final programs, as well as appearing on the SEC Network's live coverage of the SEC Kickoff program.
