= Eric Mangini =

American football coach

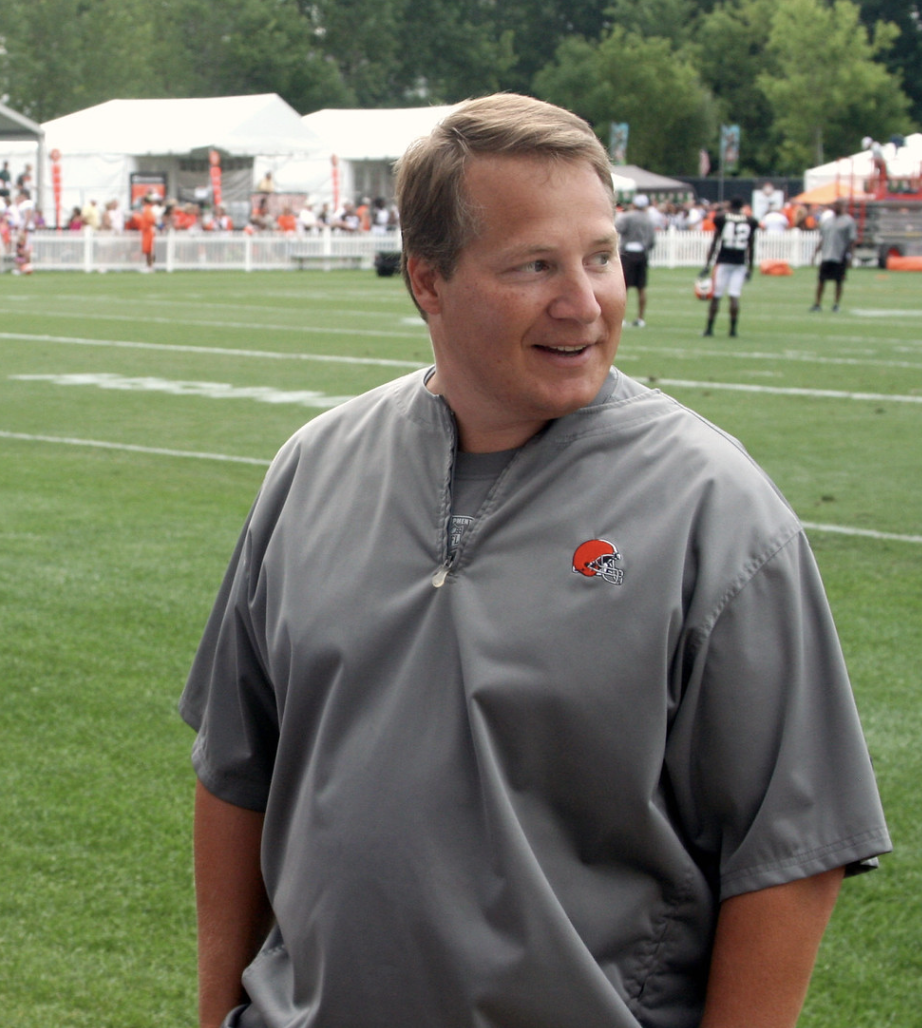
- Mangini as head coach of the Cleveland Browns

Profile
- Position: Nose tackle

Personal information
- Born: January 19, 1971 (age 55); Hartford, Connecticut, U.S.

Career information
- High school: Hartford (CT) Bulkeley
- College: Wesleyan

Career history
- Cleveland Browns (1995) Offensive assistant; Baltimore Ravens (1996) Offensive assistant; New York Jets (1997–1999) Defensive assistant; New England Patriots (2000–2005); Defensive backs coach (2000–2004); Defensive coordinator (2005); New York Jets (2006–2008) Head coach; Cleveland Browns (2009–2010) Head coach; San Francisco 49ers (2013–2015); Offensive consultant (2013); Tight ends coach (2014); Defensive coordinator (2015)

Awards and highlights
- 3× Super Bowl champion (XXXVI, XXXVIII, XXXIX)

Head coaching record
- Regular season: 33–47 (.413)
- Postseason: 0–1 (.000)
- Career: 33–48 (.407)
- Coaching profile at Pro Football Reference

Eric Anthony Mangini (born January 19, 1971) is an American former professional football coach and current television sports analyst for Fox Sports 1. He served as a head coach for the New York Jets from 2006 to 2008 and the Cleveland Browns from 2009 to 2010. After departing Cleveland, Mangini became an NFL analyst for ESPN. He returned to coaching with the San Francisco 49ers, starting in 2013 as the team's tight ends coach before being promoted to defensive coordinator in 2015, only to be fired in 2016 by new head coach Chip Kelly. Mangini then became an analyst for Fox Sports 1.

Mangini is also known for being a former assistant under Bill Belichick, serving under him as a defensive assistant while Belichick was the defensive coordinator with the Jets and later following him to the New England Patriots.

== Playing career ==
=== High school ===
Mangini was a linebacker at Bulkeley High School in Hartford, Connecticut.

=== College ===
Mangini played nose tackle at Division III Wesleyan University and holds the school's single-season (11.5) and career (36.5) sacks records. During the second semester of his junior and senior years, he coached the Kew Colts in 1991–92, a semi-professional football team in Melbourne, Australia, to two regional championships. Mangini joined the Chi Psi fraternity that coaching mentor Bill Belichick, another Wesleyan alumnus, was part of two decades earlier.

== Coaching career ==
=== NFL ===
==== Assistant coach ====
Mangini first caught the attention of Bill Belichick, under whom he would coach for nine seasons, as a 23-year-old ball boy with the Cleveland Browns. His work ethic impressed Belichick, and the head coach was instrumental in promoting Mangini to a public relations intern, and later, an offensive assistant.

After spending 1996 as an offensive assistant with the Baltimore Ravens, Mangini rejoined Belichick and spent three seasons as a defensive assistant with the New York Jets. When Belichick was hired as the New England Patriots head coach in 2000, he brought along Mangini as his defensive backs coach. Mangini, who won three Super Bowls with the Patriots, turned down defensive coordinator positions with the Miami Dolphins, Oakland Raiders and Cleveland Browns before accepting the role with New England in 2005.

==== New York Jets ====
Mangini, 35, became the youngest head coach in the NFL when he was hired by the New York Jets on January 17, 2006, to replace Herm Edwards. He beat internal candidates Donnie Henderson, Mike Heimerdinger and Mike Westhoff and external candidates Jim Haslett, Mike Tice, Tim Lewis and Joe Vitt for the job. He was quickly nicknamed "The Penguin" by receiver Laveranues Coles because of his waddle and fierce stare.

In his first season, Mangini led the Jets to a 10–6 record and a postseason berth with NFL Comeback Player of the Year quarterback Chad Pennington. The Jets, who finished the previous year 4–12, lost to the New England Patriots in a wild card playoff game.

The Jets went 4–12 in 2007, failing to make the playoffs. Early in the regular season, Mangini complained to league officials that Belichick's Patriots illegally filmed the Jets' defensive signals, exposing the "Spygate" scandal.

In 2008, a late season collapse—the Jets missed the playoffs despite an 8–3 start—led to Mangini's firing on December 29, 2008, one day after the season ended.

==== Cleveland Browns ====
Mangini was hired as the head coach of the Cleveland Browns on January 7, 2009, signing a four-year deal. Mangini faced early criticism in his tenure with the Browns for his tendency to micromanage the team and his disregard for the team's history (one of his first acts was to tear down a mural of Browns' greats on the wall of the team office). Sports Illustrated columnist Joe Posnanski went so far as to call Mangini's hiring by the Browns as the worst coaching hire from the past 25 years. In his 2013 memoir, former player Nate Jackson, who was briefly part of the Browns' practice squad during the 2009 preseason, sharply criticized Mangini. Jackson wrote that Mangini's coaching style had so alienated his players that they seemed "deep in despair" with "no fight left in them" only a few months after Mangini took over.

After starting his first season in Cleveland 1–11, the team bounced back with a win over their division rival and defending Super Bowl champion Pittsburgh Steelers. This started a four-game winning streak to end the season with a 5–11 record. On January 7, 2010, it was announced that Mike Holmgren had decided to retain Mangini as head coach of the Browns for the 2010 season.

Mangini's second season was highlighted with back-to-back upsets over the defending Super Bowl champion New Orleans Saints and New England Patriots. The Browns were forced to start rookie quarterback Colt McCoy due to injuries to starting quarterback Jake Delhomme. The season also saw the breakout of running back Peyton Hillis. These developments, however, did not amount to any marked improvement, as the Browns once again finished 5–11.

On January 3, 2011, Mangini was fired with a 10–22 record as the head coach of the Browns.

==== San Francisco 49ers ====
Mangini was hired by the San Francisco 49ers as a senior offensive consultant on June 4, 2013. On February 20, 2014, he was promoted to be the tight ends coach. On January 22, 2015, he was again promoted to be the defensive coordinator. However, after just one season, he was released along with most of the coaching staff after head coach Jim Tomsula was fired and replaced by Chip Kelly.

=== Head coaching record ===
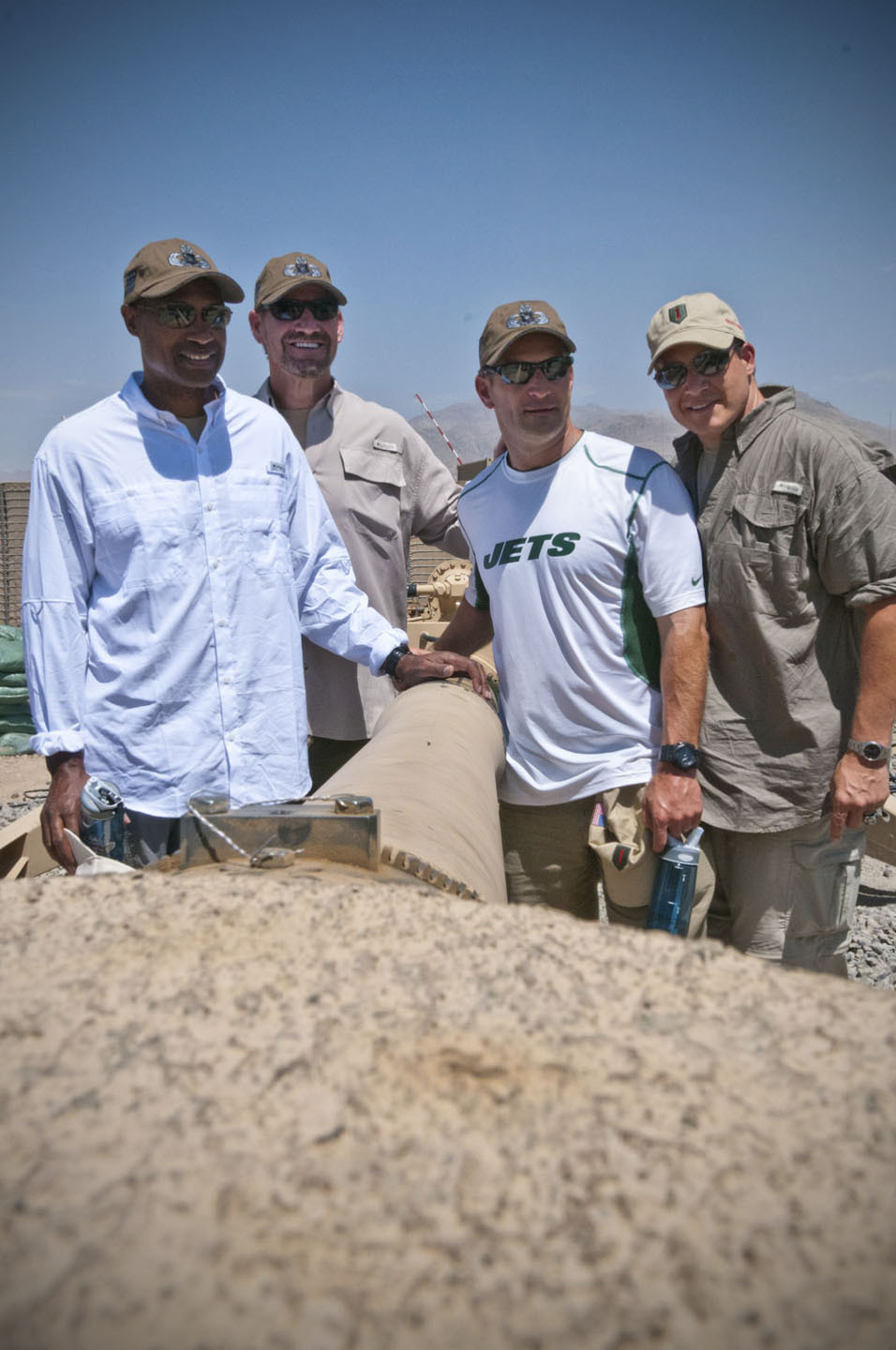
Mangini (far right) with Leslie Frazier, Bill Cowher and Ben Kotwica in 2012

Team	Year	Regular season					Postseason			
Team	Year	Won	Lost	Ties	Win %	Finish	Won	Lost	Win %	Result
NYJ	2006	10	6	0	.625	2nd in AFC East	0	1	.000	Lost to New England Patriots in AFC wild card game
NYJ	2007	4	12	0	.250	3rd in AFC East	—	—	—	—
NYJ	2008	9	7	0	.563	3rd in AFC East	—	—	—	—
NYJ total		23	25	0	.479		0	1	.000	
CLE	2009	5	11	0	.313	4th in AFC North	—	—	—	—
CLE	2010	5	11	0	.313	3rd in AFC North	—	—	—	—
CLE total		10	22	0	.313		—	—	—	
Total		33	47	0	.413		0	1	.000	

== Media career ==
Mangini had a cameo role in the penultimate episode of the crime drama The Sopranos. In the scene, Mangini is referred to by his nickname, "Mangenius".

On August 4, 2011, it was announced that Mangini would join ESPN as an NFL studio analyst on NFL Live, SportsCenter, ESPN First Take, and other programs.

Mangini is an analyst for Fox Sport's First Thing's First. He is known on the show as "Coach" and rotates every other week on the show, switching out with Greg Jennings.

== Personal life ==
Mangini and his wife Julie have three sons.

While coaching the Jets, Mangini was a resident of Harding Township, New Jersey.

Toronto Blue Jays' president Mark Shapiro is Mangini's brother-in-law and sports agent Ron Shapiro, who currently represents him, is his father-in-law.
