= Dion Morton =

British surgeon

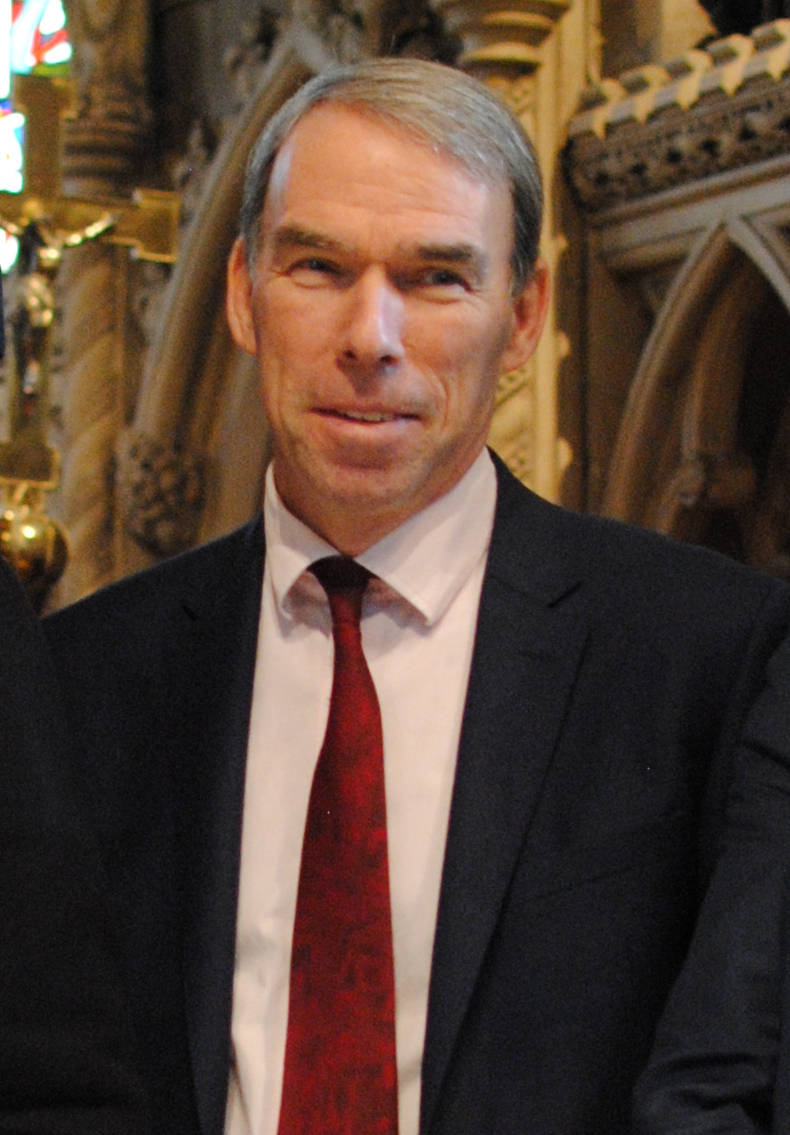
- Morton in February 2018
- Education: University of Bristol
- Known for: West Midlands Research Collaborative; Pioneering collaborative research; Establishing a national infrastructure for clinical research in surgery
- Medical career
- Field: Colorectal cancer surgery; Inflammatory bowel disease surgery; Cancer genetics
- Institutions: University of Birmingham; University Hospital Birmingham; Royal College of Surgeons of England
- Sub-specialties: Colorectal surgery
- Website: www.birmingham.ac.uk/staff/profiles/cancer-genomic/morton-dion.aspx

Dion Gregory Morton OBE is a leading colorectal surgeon at the University of Birmingham, where he has been Professor of Surgery since 2006. He was appointed Barling Chair of Surgery at the University of Birmingham in 2015. In addition he has served as Director of Clinical Research at the Royal College of Surgeons of England since 2011. In the latter role he has worked to establish a national infrastructure to support the development and dissemination of clinical trials in surgery. He has championed the role of large-scale multi centre randomised controlled trials in informing best practice in surgery.

Morton is the Chief Investigator of the 'Fluoropyrimidine, Oxaliplatin and Targeted-Receptor pre-Operative Therapy for patients with high-risk, operable colon cancer' (FOxTROT) trial. This is a groundbreaking trial testing the efficacy of neoadjuvant chemotherapy in colon cancer, a cancer in which neoadjuvant therapy has traditionally had no role.

Morton has pioneered collaborative research in surgery, having championed and closely advised the foundation of the West Midlands Research Collaborative (WMRC), the first trainee-led research network in the UK. Under his guidance the WMRC successfully delivered ROSSINI, the first-ever trainee-led multi-centre randomised controlled trial of a surgical intervention. Subsequent, high-profile ongoing trials have included DREAMS and ROCSS.

He is also regional director of the 100,000 Genomes Project in the West Midlands.

Morton was appointed Officer of the Order of the British Empire (OBE) in the 2020 Birthday Honours for services to innovation in the NHS. He was elected a Fellow of the Academy of Medical Sciences in 2025.
