= Peyton Hillis =

American football player (born 1986)

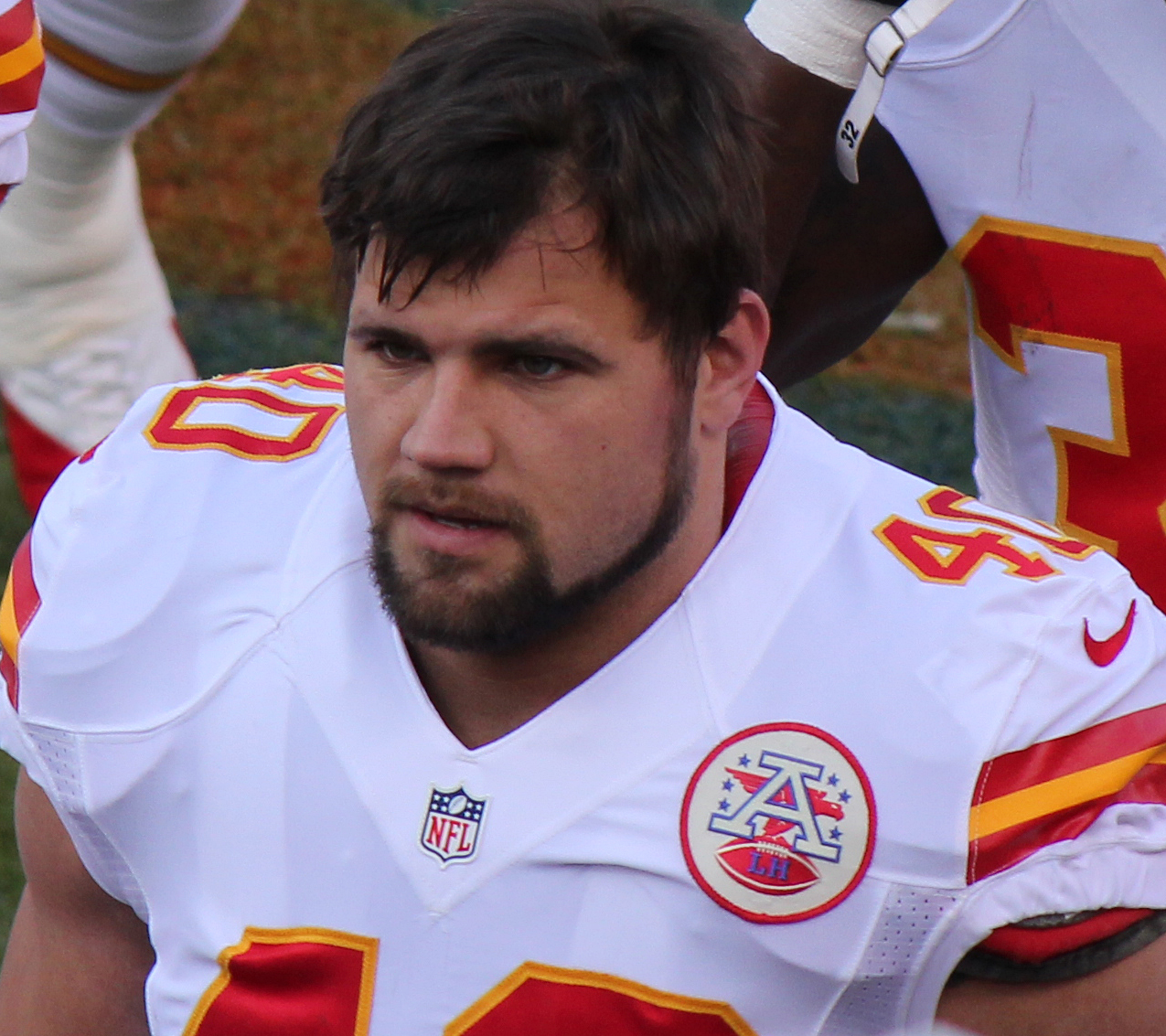
- Hillis with the Kansas City Chiefs in 2012

No. 22, 40, 44, 33
- Position: Running back

Personal information
- Born: January 21, 1986 (age 40); Conway, Arkansas, U.S.
- Listed height: 6 ft 1 in (1.85 m)
- Listed weight: 250 lb (113 kg)

Career information
- High school: Conway
- College: Arkansas (2004–2007)
- NFL draft: 2008: 7th round, 227th overall pick

Career history
- Denver Broncos (2008–2009); Cleveland Browns (2010–2011); Kansas City Chiefs (2012); Tampa Bay Buccaneers (2013); New York Giants (2013–2014)

Career NFL statistics
- Rushing yards: 2,832
- Rushing average: 4.1
- Rushing touchdowns: 23
- Receptions: 134
- Receiving yards: 1,050
- Receiving touchdowns: 3
- Stats at Pro Football Reference

Derek Peyton Hillis (born January 21, 1986) is an American former professional football running back who played in the National Football League (NFL) for seven seasons. He played college football for the Arkansas Razorbacks and was selected in the seventh round of the 2008 NFL draft by the Denver Broncos, where he spent his first two seasons. In 2010, Hillis was traded to the Cleveland Browns and rushed for over 1,000 yards during his first season with the team. Unable to match his success, he was released from the Browns the following year. Hillis spent his last three seasons with the Kansas City Chiefs, Tampa Bay Buccaneers, and New York Giants.

== Early life ==
Hillis played high school football at Conway High School. He was ranked as the #119 player in the country for the 2004 recruiting class as a running back.

== College career ==
Hillis chose to attend college at the University of Arkansas from 2004 to 2007, majoring in sociology. He chose Arkansas over a number of other offers from schools such as Oklahoma, Nebraska, Alabama, Florida, Oklahoma State, Tennessee, and LSU.

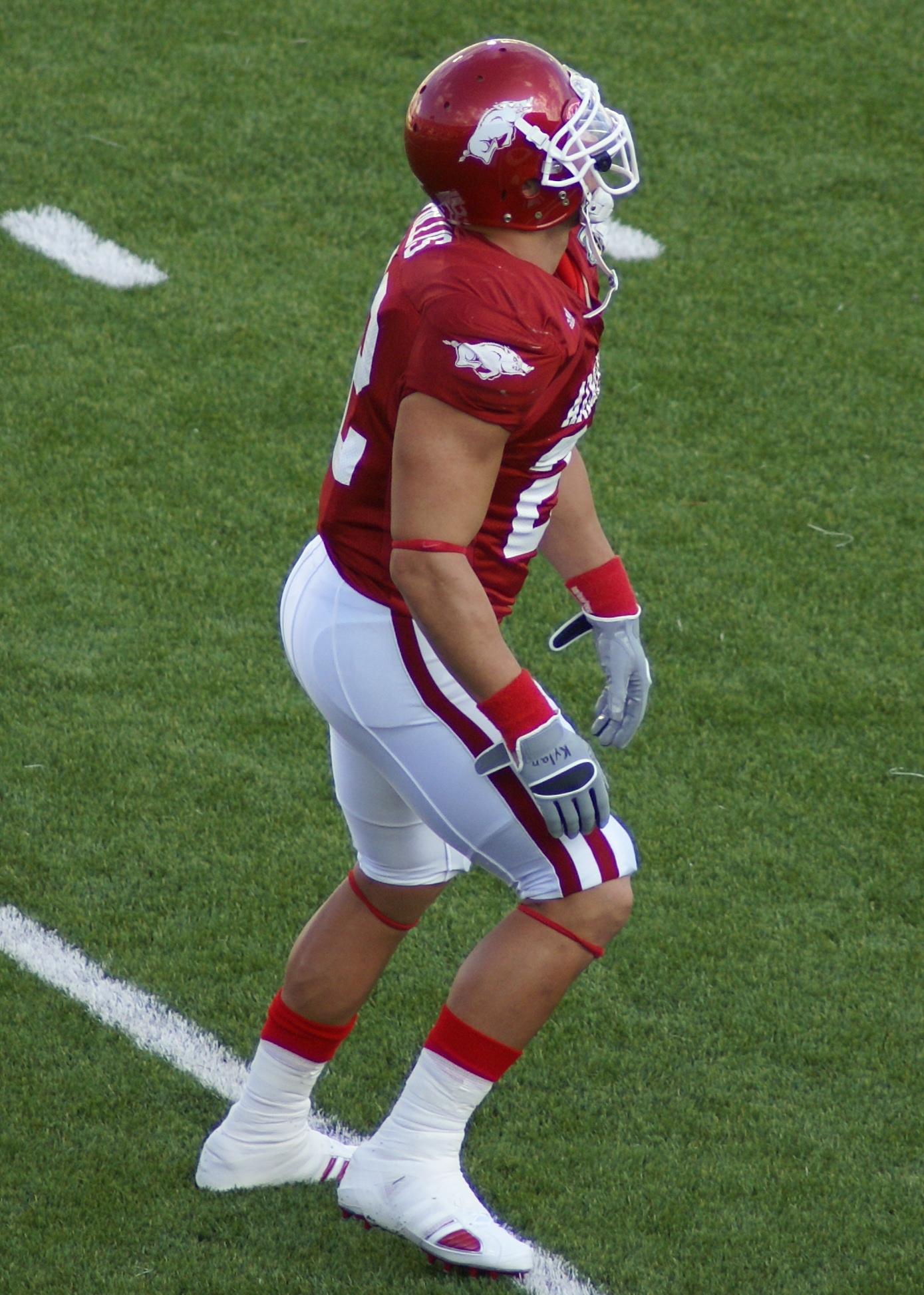
Hillis during his college years at Arkansas

As a true freshman running back, Hillis gained 240 yards rushing, 97 yards receiving, and scored eight touchdowns, ranking fourth in the SEC in total touchdowns and tying Georgia's Thomas Brown for most touchdowns scored by a SEC freshman that year.

During his sophomore year, Hillis accounted for 947 all-purpose yards (including more than 200 in kick-off and punt returns) and seven touchdowns while also serving as a blocker for up-and-coming star running backs Darren McFadden and Felix Jones.

In his junior season, Hillis only appeared in ten games due to a nagging injury, although he did return late in the season to help Arkansas win the 2006 SEC Western Division Championship. That team finished 10-4 after losing to Wisconsin in the 2007 Capital One Bowl. The biggest victory of the season came on November 11 with ESPN College GameDay in attendance, Arkansas defeated #13 Tennessee in Fayetteville, 31–14.

His senior season in 2007 saw Hillis finish with over 800 yards of total offense and score 7 total touchdowns. Although this team did not meet pre-season expectations, finishing 8–5 after losing to Missouri in the 2008 Cotton Bowl, Hillis did help Arkansas upset #1 LSU in Baton Rouge in triple overtime, 50–48. Hillis had 11 carries for 89 yards rushing and 2 TDs, as well as 5 receptions for 62 receiving yards and 2 more TDs. It was Arkansas' first victory over a #1 team since defeating Texas in 1981.

Over his four seasons as a fullback at Arkansas, Hillis helped paved the way for Darren McFadden to become the Razorbacks all-time rushing leader with three straight 1,000 yard seasons from 2005 to 2007, as well as two straight for fellow running back Felix Jones in 2006 and 2007. Arkansas was one of the most prolific running teams in the nation over those three seasons, owed in no small part to Hillis' blocking and receiving prowess.

== Professional career ==
Pre-draft measurables
Height	Weight	Arm length	Hand span	40-yard dash	10-yard split	20-yard split	20-yard shuttle	Three-cone drill	Vertical jump	Broad jump	Bench press	Wonderlic
6 ft 0 3/4 in (1.85 m)	240 lb (109 kg)	31 1/8 in (0.79 m)	9 in (0.23 m)	4.57 ** s	1.56 ** s	2.64 ** s	4.24 ** s	7.15 s	35 in (0.89 m)**	9 ft 9 in (2.97 m)	26 reps	17
** From Arkansas Pro Day, others: from NFL Combine

=== Denver Broncos ===
==== 2008 season ====
The Denver Broncos selected Hillis with the 20th pick in the seventh round (227th overall) of the 2008 NFL draft. He was also assigned his college number, 22.

At the start of the 2008 season, Hillis was listed as the Broncos' starting fullback. He played in his first NFL regular season game on September 8, 2008, gaining 14 yards on three rushing attempts and four yards on one reception as part of a 41–14 Broncos road victory over the Oakland Raiders. Later in the season, he recorded his first career 100-yard receiving game with seven catches for 116 yards and a touchdown in a 26–17 Broncos home loss to the Miami Dolphins on November 2, 2008.

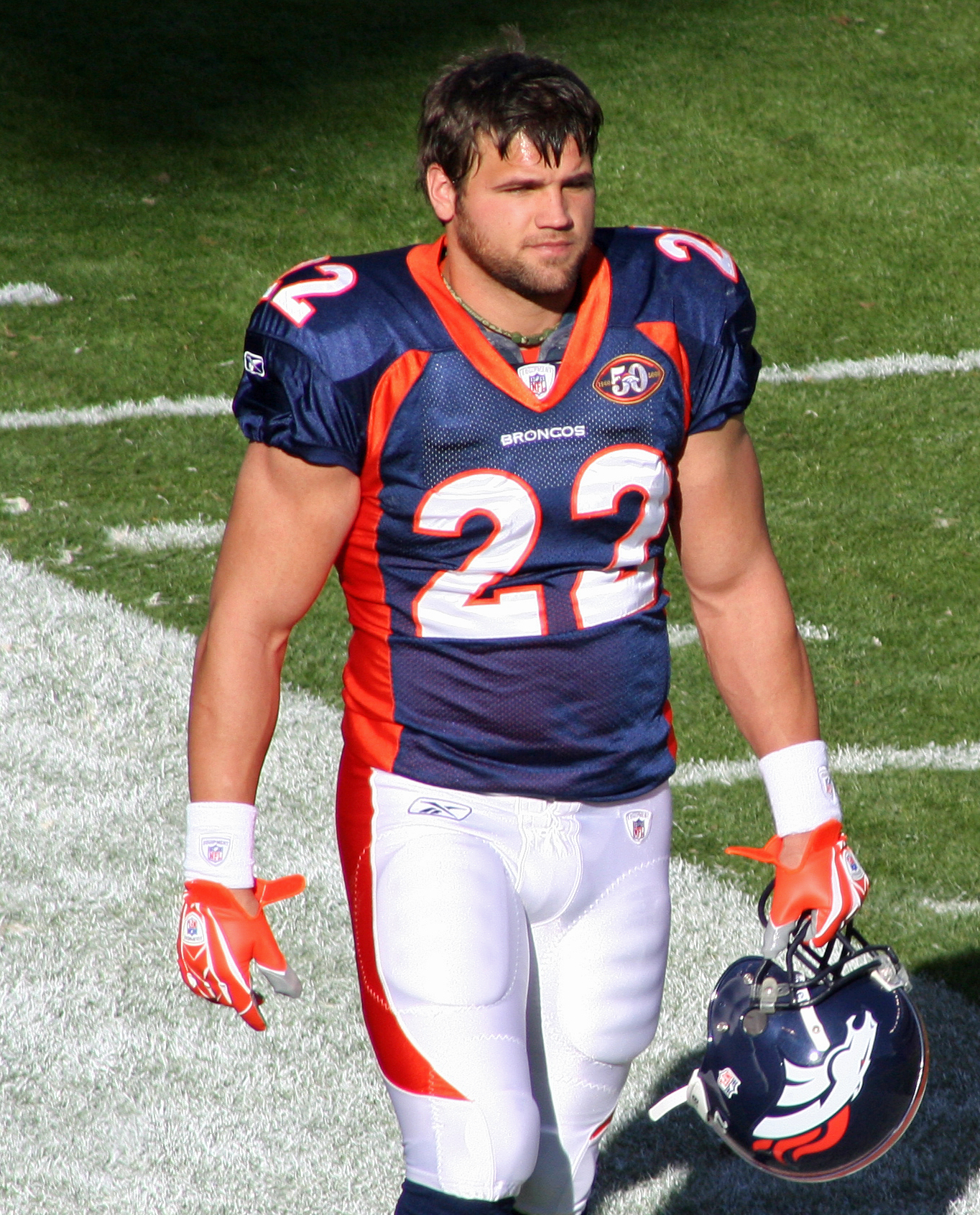
Hillis with the Denver Broncos in 2009

Following an injury to Ryan Torain in the Broncos 34–30 comeback road victory over the Cleveland Browns, Hillis was named Denver's starting running back. His first start at the position netted him 44 yards and two touchdowns on only 10 carries as part of a 24–20 road victory over the Atlanta Falcons. Two weeks later, he recorded his first 100-yard rushing game with 129 yards and a touchdown on 22 attempts in a 34–17 road victory over the New York Jets. The performance earned Hillis multiple honors including being named Diet Pepsi NFL Rookie of the Week as well as FedEx Ground Player of the Week alongside Broncos quarterback Jay Cutler, who was named NFL Air Player of the Week. The string of victories and accolades built up anticipation among Broncos faithful for Hillis to continue as running back for the rest of the season. However, the season already plagued with running back injuries continued, with Hillis suffering a season-ending injury in a 24–17 home win over the Kansas City Chiefs. Coming down from an acrobatic catch of a Cutler pass with his right foot planted, Hillis was hit from both sides by Chiefs' free safety Jarrad Page and cornerback Brandon Carr. The hit doubled Hillis over, causing a 2–3 inch tear in his right hamstring behind the knee, which forced him to miss the rest of the season. Despite his limited playing time, Hillis ended the 2008 season as the Broncos' leading rusher with 343 yards and five touchdowns and was expected to return as a significant offensive presence for the 2009 season.

With the loss of Hillis, depth at the running back position was practically nil and the Broncos fell to 8–8 on the season and failed to make the playoffs. Due to a lack of postseason berths in recent years, Broncos coach Mike Shanahan was fired during the offseason and replaced with Josh McDaniels. McDaniels' first order of business was to recruit new talent to fit his playing scheme, which involved adding depth to the running back position with first round draft pick Knowshon Moreno and free agent Correll Buckhalter.

==== 2009 season ====
Despite rising to the starting fullback position and becoming the leading rusher the previous year, Hillis had only 54 yards on 13 carries in the 2009 season. As the Broncos offense collapsed late-season and Hillis still saw no significant playtime, fans began speculating about a disagreement between Hillis and McDaniels as had been the case with other Shanahan carry-overs. In a postseason interview, Hillis expressed disappointment over his playing time on the season, but remained tight-lipped about the controversy, maintaining that conversations between him and McDaniels were "friendly". In the same interview, Hillis was quoted as saying his future in Denver was "up in the air". On March 14, 2010, the Broncos traded Hillis to the Cleveland Browns along with a sixth-round pick in the 2011 Draft and a conditional pick in the 2012 Draft in exchange for quarterback Brady Quinn.

=== Cleveland Browns ===
==== 2010 season ====
Hillis's arrival in Cleveland was met with anticipation after the results of his active stint in Denver during the 2008 season. During the 2010 preseason, the Browns distributed snaps evenly between Hillis, Jerome Harrison, James Davis, Chris Jennings, and Montario Hardesty (upon returning from injury). Hillis' best pre-season rushing game came in Week 2 against the St. Louis Rams when, getting the majority of the snaps, Hillis ran for 51 yards on 12 carries (4.3 YPC).

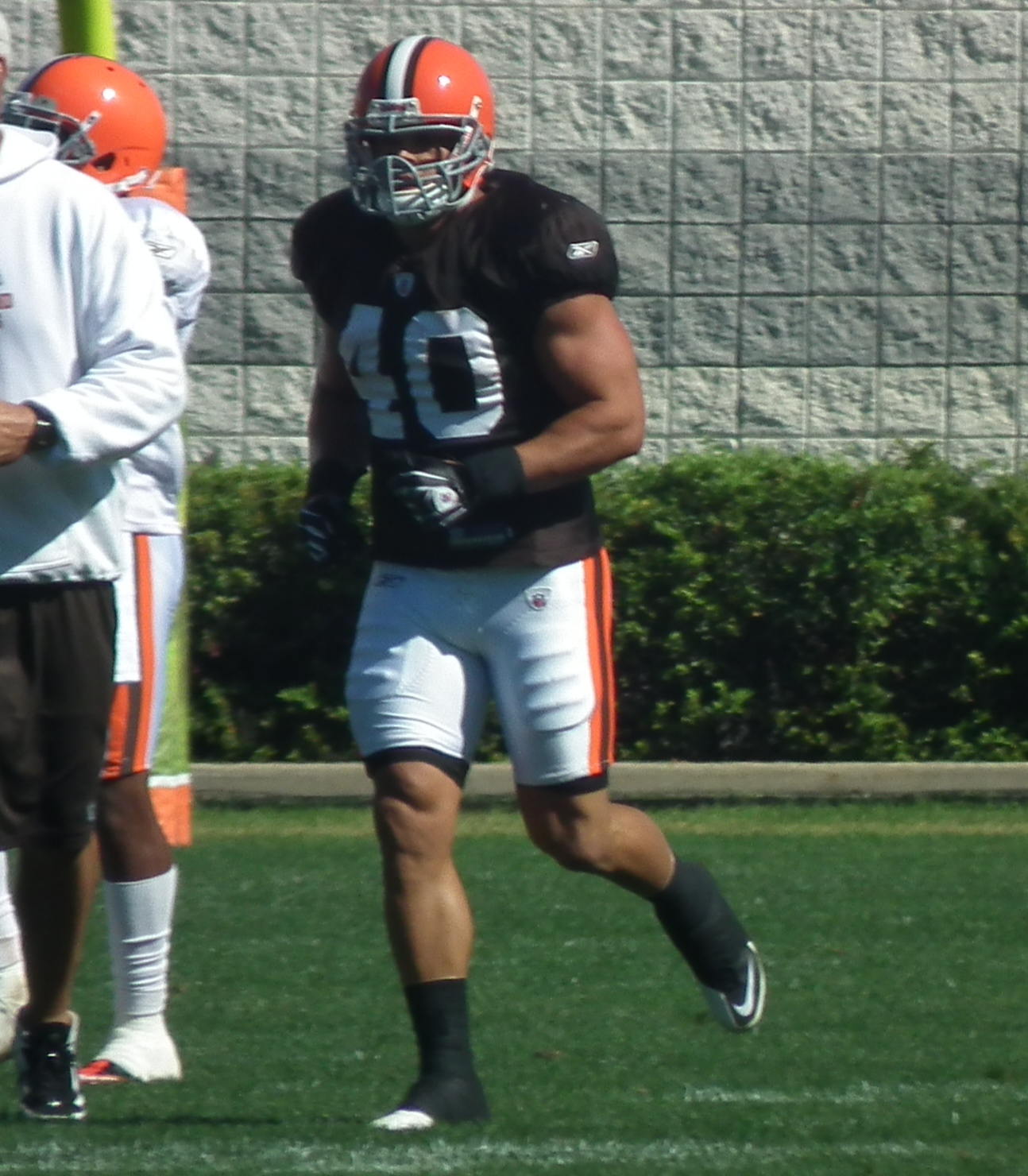
Hillis with the Cleveland Browns in 2011

As the regular season began, Hillis' start in Cleveland began much the same way as it did in Denver, listed down the depth chart at both tight end and fullback. Also like his start in Denver, early season injuries to Harrison and Davis thrust Hillis into the starting spot for the Week 3 game versus the Baltimore Ravens. The result was a 144-yard (6.5 YPC) romp against the Ravens' staunch rushing defense, which allowed just 3.4 yards per carry in the 2009 season. Hillis also added 36 yards on seven receptions for a total of 180 all-purpose yards. The next week, Hillis again ran for over 100 yards at home against the Cincinnati Bengals, leading the Browns to their first victory in the 2010 regular season. A thigh injury in practice limited Hillis in Week 5 against the Atlanta Falcons, though Hillis did add a 19-yard reception for a touchdown, making him the first Browns player since Greg Pruitt to record touchdowns in five consecutive games, though Pruitt's came all through rushing. Coming off a bye week in Week 8, Hillis set career marks in both rushing and all-purpose yards against the New England Patriots in Week 9, finishing the game with 184 rushing yards (6.5 ypc) and 220 yards of total offense. Following this game, Hillis was named AFC Offensive Player of the Week for Week 9, the first Cleveland Browns running back to win that honor since Eric Metcalf in 1992. In week 12, Hillis joined Marshall Faulk as the only players to have achieved more than 130 yards rushing, three rushing touchdowns, and 60 yards receiving in a single game. On December 12, 2010, Hillis went over the 1,000 yard mark on an eight-yard rush, that was preceded by a 25-yard rush. He was the first white running back since Craig James in 1985 to rush for at least 1,000 yards in a season.

Due to his breakout season, Hillis was the Browns finalist in the Madden NFL 12 cover vote. After upsetting Ray Rice, Matt Ryan, and Super Bowl MVP Aaron Rodgers, he advanced to the finals where he faced off against Michael Vick. On April 27, 2011, Hillis was announced as the cover athlete for the game, beating out Vick with 66 percent of the vote.

==== 2011 season ====
Hillis had a difficult 2011 season, beginning with unsuccessful negotiations to extend his contract. He had a good game in a Week 2 matchup with the Indianapolis Colts, running for 94 yards and two touchdowns, but he then sat out a game the next week against the Miami Dolphins with strep throat on the advice of his agent. Hillis then injured his hamstring twice, once in a game and once in practice, limiting his performance and frustrating teammates. He rebounded towards the end of the season, rushing for 99 yards against the Arizona Cardinals and 112 versus the Baltimore Ravens to finish with 587 and three touchdowns. At the end of the year, Hillis stated he wanted to re-sign with the Browns, even willing to offer a hometown discount, but the Browns never made him an offer and allowed him to leave as a free agent to Kansas City. Hillis attributed his struggles to the Madden Curse, a superstition centered on athletes who appear on the Madden cover.

=== Kansas City Chiefs ===
On March 14, 2012, Hillis signed with the Kansas City Chiefs. He finished the 2012 season with 309 yards on 85 carries as a backup to Jamaal Charles.

=== Tampa Bay Buccaneers ===
On July 23, 2013, Hillis signed with the Tampa Bay Buccaneers. On September 21, Hillis was released by the Buccaneers without appearing in a game.

=== New York Giants ===
On October 16, 2013, the New York Giants announced they had signed Hillis for the 2013–14 season. On March 11, 2014, the Giants gave Hillis a $1.8 million contract extension for two more years. Before the start of the 2014 season, Hillis agreed to change his number from #44 to #33, so that rookie Andre Williams could wear the number he wore in college. Hillis had also worn number 33 while in training camp with the Buccaneers.

On February 25, 2015, the Giants announced the release of Hillis.

=== Retirement ===
Hillis retired in 2015, at his doctor's behest due to his history of concussions and the potential of future injury. Hillis also claimed in an interview, "as far as NFL football goes, my heart's just not in it anymore."

== Career statistics ==
Legend
**Bold**	Career high

=== NFL ===
Year	Team	Games		Rushing					Receiving				
Year	Team	GP	GS	Att	Yds	Avg	Lng	TD	Rec	Yds	Avg	Lng	TD
2008	DEN	12	6	68	343	**5.0**	19	5	14	179	**12.8**	47	1
2009	DEN	14	2	13	54	4.2	13	1	4	19	4.8	6	0
2010	CLE	16	14	**270**	**1,177**	4.4	**48**	**11**	**61**	**477**	7.8	47	**2**
2011	CLE	10	9	161	587	3.6	24	3	22	130	5.9	**52**	0
2012	KC	13	2	85	309	3.6	18	1	10	62	6.2	15	0
2013	NYG	7	1	73	247	3.4	27	2	13	96	7.4	16	0
2014	NYG	9	0	26	115	4.4	16	0	10	87	8.7	26	0
Career		81	34	696	2,832	4.1	48	23	134	1,050	7.8	52	3

=== College ===
Season	Team	GP	Rushing					Receiving					Kickoff returns					Punt returns				
Season	Team	GP	Att	Yds	Avg	Lng	TD	Rec	Yds	Avg	Lng	TD	Ret	Yds	Avg	Lng	TD	Ret	Yds	Avg	Lng	TD
2004	Arkansas	10	63	240	3.8	42	**6**	12	97	8.1	18	2	**7**	**128**	18.3	**30**	0	0	0	0.0	0	0
2005	Arkansas	11	**65**	315	4.8	32	3	38	402	10.6	**45**	4	3	65	**21.7**	23	0	**16**	**165**	10.3	**27**	0
2006	Arkansas	10	13	57	4.9	12	1	19	159	8.4	21	0	1	18	18.0	18	0	8	92	**11.5**	**27**	0
2007	Arkansas	13	62	**348**	**5.6**	**65**	2	**49**	**539**	**11.0**	34	**5**	1	2	2.0	2	0	1	0	0.0	0	0
Total		44	203	960	4.7	65	12	118	1,197	10.1	45	11	12	213	17.8	30	0	25	257	10.3	27	0

== Personal life ==
Hillis has two children with ex-wife Amanda. In 2021, Hillis made his acting debut in the horror movie The Hunting, directed by Mark Andrew Hamer. Hillis received top-billing in the film for his role. Set photos indicated he portrayed a werewolf.

In January 2023, Hillis was reported to be in critical condition after getting injured while saving his young niece and son from drowning. He was released from the hospital after almost three weeks. In February 2023, Hillis said that he expects to make a full recovery.
