= Ko Quaye =

American football player (born 1987)

No. 98
- Position: Defensive tackle

Personal information
- Born: May 11, 1987 (age 39); Monrovia, Liberia
- Listed height: 6 ft 1 in (1.85 m)
- Listed weight: 387 lb (176 kg)

Career information
- High school: Champlin Park (Brooklyn Park, Minnesota, U.S.)
- College: South Dakota
- NFL draft: 2010: undrafted

Career history
- Jacksonville Jaguars (2010)*; Buffalo Bills (2010)*; Cleveland Browns (2010); Tampa Bay Storm (2012); Edmonton Eskimos (2012)*; Chicago Rush (2013)*; Philadelphia Soul (2013); Orlando Predators (2014)
- * Offseason or practice squad member only

Career AFL statistics
- Tackles: 20
- Sacks: 4.5
- Pass Breakups: 4
- Blocked kicks: 4
- Stats at ArenaFan.com
- Stats at Pro Football Reference

Kommonyan "Ko" Quaye (born May 11, 1976) is a former American football defensive tackle. He played college football at South Dakota.

== Professional career ==
=== Jacksonville Jaguars ===
Quaye was signed as a undrafted free agent for the Jacksonville Jaguars in 2010. He was cut on September 4, 2010, but was signed to the Jaguars' practice squad on September 5, 2010. On October 6, 2010, Quaye was waived from the Jaguars' practice squad.

=== Buffalo Bills ===
Quaye was signed to the Buffalo Bills' practice squad on November 24, 2010.

=== Cleveland Browns ===
On December 23, 2010, Quaye was signed off the Bills practice squad to the Cleveland Browns' practice squad.

=== Edmonton Eskimos ===
Quaye signed by the Edmonton Eskimos on February 13, 2012, but was released with the final roster cuts on June 23, 2012.

=== Philadelphia Soul ===
The Rush traded Quaye to the Philadelphia Soul on March 13, 2013 before ever playing a game with the Rush.
