= Johnathan Haggerty =

American football player (born 1988)

No. 14, 25, 86
- Position: Wide receiver

Personal information
- Born: February 5, 1988 (age 38); Dallas, Texas, U.S.
- Listed height: 6 ft 1 in (1.85 m)
- Listed weight: 195 lb (88 kg)

Career information
- High school: Dallas (TX) Lincoln
- College: SW Oklahoma State
- NFL draft: 2010: undrafted

Career history
- Cleveland Browns (2010); Chicago Bears (2011)*; New England Patriots (2013)*; Wichita Falls Nighthawks (2015)*; Texas Revolution (2015); Jacksonville Sharks (2015–2016); Hudson Valley Fort (2015); Sioux Falls Storm (2017)*; Texas Revoloution (2017)*
- * Offseason or practice squad member only

Career AFL statistics
- Receptions: 2
- Receiving yards: 43
- Receiving touchdowns: 1
- Total tackles: 4.5
- Stats at ArenaFan.com
- Stats at Pro Football Reference

Johnathan Haggerty (born February 5, 1988) is an American former professional football wide receiver. He was previously a member of the Cleveland Browns and Chicago Bears. He played college football at SW Oklahoma State. After his time at the NFL, he then trained people of all ages at D1, a training facility in Dallas, Texas.

== Professional career ==
=== Cleveland Browns ===
On April 30, 2010, Haggerty was signed as an undrafted free agent by the Cleveland Browns. He was then later waived by Cleveland on August 16, due to an injury suffered during week 1 of the preseason against Green Bay.

Haggerty was waived by Cleveland again on August 28, 2011.

=== Chicago Bears ===
Haggerty was signed to the Bears practice squad on December 20, 2011.

=== New England Patriots ===
On August 1, 2013, Haggerty was signed by the New England Patriots. He was released by the Patriots on August 30, 2013.

=== Wichita Falls Nighthawks ===
In 2015, Haggerty signed with the Wichita Falls Nighthawks of the Indoor Football League.

=== Texas Revolution ===
In March 2015, Haggerty joined the Texas Revolution of Champions Indoor Football.

=== Jacksonville Sharks ===
On April 7, 2015, Haggerty was assigned to the Jacksonville Sharks of the Arena Football League (AFL). On April 22, 2016, Haggerty was placed on reassignment by the Sharks.

=== Hudson Valley Fort ===
In the Fall of 2015, Haggerty signed with the Hudson Valley Fort of the Fall Experimental Football League (FXFL).

=== Sioux Falls Storm ===
On November 15, 2016, Haggerty signed with the Sioux Falls Storm. On February 9, 2017, Haggerty was released.

=== Texas Revoloution ===
On February 20, 2017, Haggerty signed with the Texas Revoloution. He was released on March 16, 2017. Haggerty re-signed with the Revolution on March 24, 2017. He was released again on March 27, 2017.
