= 2009 Cleveland Browns season =

61st season in franchise history

- Owner: Randy Lerner
- General manager: George Kokinis
- Head coach: Eric Mangini
- Home stadium: Cleveland Browns Stadium

Results
- Record: 5–11
- Division place: 4th AFC North
- Playoffs: Did not qualify
- All-Pros: Josh Cribbs (1st team); Joe Thomas (1st team)
- Pro Bowlers: KR Josh Cribbs; T Joe Thomas

The 2009 Cleveland Browns season was the team's 61st season as a professional sports franchise and its 57th season as a member of the National Football League (NFL). The team placed fourth in the AFC North with a record of 5–11, improving upon its 2008 record of 4–12, after winning their last four games of the season after a 1–11 start. This season marked George Kokinis and Eric Mangini's first seasons as the team's general manager and head coach, respectively; however, Kokinis was fired on November 2 during the team's Week 9 bye week. The Browns played all of their home games at Cleveland Browns Stadium in Cleveland, Ohio.

The Browns missed the playoffs for the seventh straight season, tying a record set between 1973–79.

== Offseason ==
=== Personnel changes ===
On December 29, 2008, the Cleveland Browns announced that the team had fired general manager Phil Savage and head coach Romeo Crennel after spending four seasons together in Cleveland. Crennel, who joined the Browns with Savage in 2005, left Cleveland with a record of 24–40 (.375) and an 0–8 record against the division rival Pittsburgh Steelers. The team's best record under Crennel was 10–6 during the 2007 season.

On January 7, 2009, the Browns announced that the team had found its replacement for Crennel and that it had reached a contractual agreement with former New York Jets head coach Eric Mangini, who was fired after three seasons in New York. Mangini, who joined the Jets in 2006, left New York with a record of 23–25 (.479), including a 10–6 record and a playoff appearance in his first season.

On January 14, the Browns announced that Mangini had named his coordinators: Brian Daboll was hired as the offensive coordinator; Rob Ryan as the defensive coordinator; and Brad Seely as the special teams coordinator and assistant head coach. Daboll was most recently the quarterbacks coach for the Jets from 2007–2008; Ryan was the defensive coordinator for the Oakland Raiders from 2004–2008; and Seely was the special teams coach for the New England Patriots from 1999–2008. All three worked with Mangini from 2000–2003 as members of New England. Daboll, Ryan and Seely replaced Rob Chudzinski, Mel Tucker and Ted Daisher, respectively.

On January 22, the Browns hired five assistant coaches: Bryan Cox was hired as the defensive line coach; Andy Dickerson as the defensive quality control coach; Jerome Henderson as the defensive backs coach; Rick Lyle as an assistant strength-and-conditioning coach; and Carl Smith as the quarterbacks coach. Cox, Dickerson, Henderson and Lyle spent the previous three seasons with Mangini in New York. Smith was the Browns' quarterbacks coach from 2001–2003 and was most recently the offensive coordinator for the Jacksonville Jaguars from 2005–2006.

On January 25, the Browns hired former Baltimore Ravens director of pro personnel George Kokinis as general manager. Kokinis spent five seasons in the Browns' scouting department from 1991 to 1995, and after the team moved to Baltimore, he was a member of the Ravens' scouting department from 1996–1999. He was the Ravens' assistant director of pro personnel from 2000–2002 and was the director of pro personnel from 2003–2008.

On February 4, the Browns hired three more assistant coaches: Alan DeGennaro was hired as an assistant strength-and-conditioning coach; Tom Myslinski as the strength-and-conditioning coach; and George Warhop as the offensive line coach. On February 11, the Browns hired George McDonald as the offensive quality control coach. On February 17, the Browns hired Gary Brown as the running backs coach and Steve Hagen as the tight ends coach. On February 22, the Browns hired Matt Eberflus as the linebackers coach.

On May 6, the Browns promoted McDonald to wide receivers coach.

=== Roster changes ===
==== Free agents ====
Pos	Player	Tag	2009 Team	Signed
FS	Mike Adams	UFA	Browns	March 6
FB	Charles Ali	ERFA	Browns	March 23
TE	Brad Cieslak	ERFA/UFA		
SS	Steve Cargile	UFA	Giants	January 16
CB	Travis Daniels	UFA	Chiefs	March 10
LB	Andra Davis	UFA	Broncos	March 2
TE	Darnell Dinkins	UFA	Saints	March 18
LB	Kris Griffin	UFA		
CB	Daven Holly	UFA		
SS	Sean Jones	UFA	Eagles	March 6
DT	Louis Leonard	ERFA		
TE	John Madsen	RFA		
LB	Willie McGinest	UFA		
G	Seth McKinney	UFA	Bills	April 9
WR	Syndric Steptoe	ERFA	Browns	March 6
RB	Jason Wright	UFA	Cardinals	March 16
G	Scott Young	UFA	Broncos	March 13

Player re-signed by Browns

==== Releases ====
Pos	Player	Released	2009 Team	Signed
CB	Terry Cousin	February 9		
QB	Ken Dorsey	February 9		
P	Mike Dragosavich	February 9	Colts	February 13
QB	Bruce Gradkowski	February 9	Raiders	February 10
WR	Joe Jurevicius	March 11		
RB	Allen Patrick	April 25		
LB	Antwan Peek	February 9		
K	Jason Reda	February 9		
T	Kevin Shaffer	March 12	Bears	March 25
G	Eric Young	February 9		

==== Signings ====
Pos	Player	Tag	2008 Team	Signed
LB	Eric Barton	UFA	Jets	March 13
LB	David Bowens	UFA	Jets	March 12
LB	Blake Costanzo	UFA	Bills	June 17
T	George Foster	UFA	Lions	June 5
WR	Mike Furrey	UFA	Lions	May 5
RB	Noah Herron	UFA	Jets	March 18
CB	Rod Hood	UFA	Cardinals	May 26
CB	Corey Ivy	UFA	Ravens	March 19
DE	C. J. Mosley	UFA	Jets	March 6
WR	David Patten	UFA	Saints	March 23
CB	Hank Poteat	UFA	Jets	March 9
TE	Robert Royal	UFA	Bills	March 5
LB	Bo Ruud	UFA	Patriots	April 30
T	John St. Clair	UFA	Bears	March 17
G	Floyd Womack	UFA	Seahawks	March 13

==== Trades ====
On February 27, the Browns traded tight end Kellen Winslow to the Tampa Bay Buccaneers for its second-round selection in the 2009 NFL draft (50th overall, used to select Mohamed Massaquoi) and its fifth-round selection in the 2010 NFL draft. Winslow was selected sixth overall by the Browns in the first round of the 2004 NFL draft and played five seasons with the team. During his career with the Browns, he accumulated 219 receptions for 2,459 yards (11.2 YPC) and had eleven touchdown receptions.

On April 25, during the first round of the 2009 NFL draft, the team traded its first-round selection (5th overall) to the Jets for its first- and second-round selections (17th and 52nd overall), defensive end Kenyon Coleman, safety Abram Elam and quarterback Brett Ratliff.

==== 2009 draft class ====
Draft		Player	Pos	College	Signed	Notes
Rnd	Sel	Player	Pos	College	Signed	Notes
1	21	Alex Mack	C	Cal	July 25	(Note: The team traded its first-round selection (5th overall, used to select Mark Sanchez) to the Jets for its first- (17th overall, traded to Tampa Bay; used to select Josh Freeman) and second-round (52nd overall) selections, defensive end Kenyon Coleman, safety Abram Elam and quarterback Brett Ratliff.) (Note: The team traded the first-round selection it acquired from the Jets (17th overall, used to select Josh Freeman) to Tampa Bay for its first-round selection (19th overall, traded to Philadelphia; used to select Jeremy Maclin) and a sixth-round selection (191st overall) it acquired from Chicago.) (Note: The team traded the first-round selection it acquired from Tampa Bay (19th overall, used to select Jeremy Maclin) to Philadelphia for its first-round selection (21st overall) and a sixth-round selection (195th overall) it acquired from Minnesota.)
2	36	Brian Robiskie	WR	Ohio State	July 30	
2	50	Mohamed Massaquoi	WR	Georgia	July 28	(Note: The team traded tight end Kellen Winslow to Tampa Bay for its second-round selection (50th overall) and its fifth-round selection in the 2010 NFL draft.)
2	52	David Veikune	DE	Hawaii	July 26	(Note: See draft note 1)
4	104	Kaluka Maiava	LB	Southern Cal	July 24	
6	177	Don Carey	CB	Norfolk State	July 15	
6	191	Coye Francies	CB	San Jose State	July 15	(Note: See draft note 2)
6	195	James Davis	RB	Clemson	July 15	(Note: See draft note 3)

The Browns did not have third-, (Note: The team traded its third-round selection (69th overall, used to select Jason Williams) to Dallas for its fourth-round selection (111th overall, used to select Martin Rucker) in the 2008 NFL draft.) fifth-, (Note: The team traded its fifth-round selection (141st overall, used to select Kenny McKinley) to Philadelphia for its sixth-round selection (191st overall, used to select Paul Hubbard) in the 2008 NFL Draft.) or seventh-round (Note: The team traded its seventh-round selection (214th overall, used to select J. D. Folsom) to Miami for cornerback Travis Daniels.) selections in the draft.

==== Undrafted free agents ====
Pos	Player	College	Signed	Cut
LB	Marcus Benard	Jackson State	May 1	
CB	Corey Boudreaux	San Diego State	April 27	May 4
T	Branndon Braxton	Oklahoma	May 1	September 5
WR	Brent Casteel	Utah	April 27	May 4
G	Marlon Davis	Alabama	April 27	
LB	Jonathan Foster	Central State	May 1	July 15
DE	Adam Hoppel	Cincinnati	April 29	September 5
LB	Phillip Hunt	Houston	May 1	
S	Bret Lockett	UCLA	May 4	
TE	Mike Massey	Michigan	May 1	May 4
CB	Nate Ness	Arizona	April 28	July 15
WR	Jordan Norwood	Penn State	April 26	September 5
CB	Antonio Smith	Bowling Green	April 28	May 4
S	Jason Venson	Central Florida	April 26	June 5
S	Bryan Williams	Akron	April 27	June 15

=== Legal troubles for WR Stallworth ===
On March 14, Browns wide receiver Donté Stallworth was involved in a fatal accident in which he struck and killed pedestrian Mario Reyes with his car in the early morning in Miami, Florida. Stallworth then stopped his vehicle and called 9–1–1. Reports showed that Stallworth was driving under the influence; his blood-alcohol level was 0.12%, above Florida's legal limit of 0.08%. He was charged with DUI manslaughter and a warrant was issued for his arrest on April 1 and he surrendered to police on April 2. On June 16, Stallworth pleaded guilty. He was sentenced to 30 days in prison, two years' house arrest and eight years' probation. Many believed that the sentence Stallworth received was too lenient as he could have served up to 15 years in jail. Stallworth also reached an undisclosed financial settlement with the victim's family. On June 18, the NFL suspended Stallworth indefinitely On August 13, the NFL officially suspended Stallworth for the entire 2009 season and made plans to reinstate him after the Super Bowl.

=== Uniform changes ===
In 2009, the Cleveland Browns wore brown pants for games in which they wear white jerseys. These were worn in the 2008 pre-season. New additions to this uniform combination are striped socks.

== Staff ==
2009 Cleveland Browns staff
Front office: Owner – Randy Lerner; President – Mike Keenan; Senior vice president – Lewis Merletti; Vice president of football administration – Dawn Aponte; Executive advisors – Jim Brown, Bernie Kosar; Director of college scouting – Pat Roberts; Senior director of pro personnel – Steve Sabo; Director of pro personnel – Keith O'Quinn; Associate director of pro personnel – Jim Jauch; Assistant director of pro personnel – James Kirkland; Head coaches: Head coach – Eric Mangini; Assistant to the head coach – Luke Steckel; Offensive coaches: Offensive coordinator – Brian Daboll; Quarterbacks – Carl Smith; Running backs – Gary Brown; Wide receivers – George McDonald; Tight ends – Steve Hagen; Offensive line – George Warhop; Offensive assistant – Dan Shamash	Defensive coaches: Defensive coordinator – Rob Ryan; Defensive line – Bryan Cox; Linebackers – Matt Eberflus; Defensive backs – Jerome Henderson; Defensive quality control – Andy Dickerson; Special teams coaches: Special teams coordinator/Assistant head coach – Brad Seely; Assistant special teams – Tracy Smith; Strength and conditioning: Strength and conditioning – Tom Myslinski; Assistant strength and conditioning – Alan DeGennaro; Assistant strength and conditioning – Rick Lyle

== Roster ==
=== Opening training camp roster ===
Cleveland Browns 2009 opening training camp roster
Quarterbacks: 3 Derek Anderson; 10 Brady Quinn; 13 Richard Bartel; 5 Brett Ratliff; Running backs: 41 Charles Ali FB; 28 James Davis; 35 Jerome Harrison; 33 Noah Herron; 31 Jamal Lewis; 47 Lawrence Vickers FB; Wide receivers: 16 Josh Cribbs; 88 Mike Furrey; 89 Paul Hubbard; 9 Lance Leggett; 11 Mohamed Massaquoi; 2 Jordan Norwood; 81 David Patten; 80 Brian Robiskie; 12 Syndric Steptoe; Tight ends: 82 Steve Heiden; 85 John Madsen; 84 Robert Royal; 86 Martin Rucker; 87 Aaron Walker	Offensive linemen: 75 Branndon Braxton T; 74 George Foster T; 66 Hank Fraley C; 62 Dustin Fry C; 70 Rex Hadnot G; 55 Alex Mack C; 63 Kurt Quarterman G; 61 Isaac Sowells T; 78 John St. Clair T; 65 Eric Steinbach G; 73 Joe Thomas T; 72 Ryan Tucker T/G; 77 Floyd Womack T; Defensive linemen: 90 Kenyon Coleman DE; 67 Adam Hoppel DE; 93 Louis Leonard NT; 69 C. J. Mosley DE; 60 Melila Purcell DE; 92 Shaun Rogers NT; 71 Ahtyba Rubin NT; 98 Robaire Smith DE; 91 Shaun Smith NT; 97 Santonio Thomas DE; 99 Corey Williams DE	Linebackers: 50 Eric Barton ILB; 58 Beau Bell ILB; 49 Marcus Benard OLB; 96 David Bowens ILB; 59 Titus Brown OLB; 44 Blake Costanzo ILB; 51 Alex Hall OLB; 53 Phillip Hunt OLB; 52 D'Qwell Jackson ILB; 56 Kaluka Maiava ILB; 43 Bo Ruud ILB; 57 David Veikune OLB; 94 Leon Williams ILB; 95 Kamerion Wimbley OLB; Defensive backs: 42 Hamza Abdullah SS; 20 Mike Adams FS; 37 Don Carey CB; 26 Abram Elam SS; 40 Roderick Hood CB; 29 Corey Ivy CB; 30 Gerard Lawson CB; 39 Bret Lockett SS; 22 Brandon McDonald CB; 21 Brodney Pool FS; 23 Hank Poteat CB; 27 Nick Sorensen SS; 24 Eric Wright CB; Special teams: 4 Phil Dawson K; 64 Ryan Pontbriand LS; 15 Dave Zastudil P	Reserve lists: 79 Marlon Davis G (Left Camp); 17 Braylon Edwards WR (active/NF-Inj.); 25 Coye Francies CB (active/NF-Inj.); 18 Donté Stallworth WR (Susp.); 80 Active, 2 Inactive

=== Week 1 roster ===
Cleveland Browns 2009 week 1 roster
Quarterbacks: 3 Derek Anderson; 10 Brady Quinn; 5 Brett Ratliff; Running backs: 28 James Davis; 35 Jerome Harrison; 31 Jamal Lewis; 38 Cedric Peerman; 47 Lawrence Vickers FB; Wide receivers: 16 Josh Cribbs; 17 Braylon Edwards; 87 Mike Furrey; 11 Mohamed Massaquoi; 80 Brian Robiskie; Tight ends: 82 Steve Heiden; 84 Robert Royal; 86 Martin Rucker	Offensive linemen: 66 Hank Fraley C; 70 Rex Hadnot G; 55 Alex Mack C; 78 John St. Clair T; 65 Eric Steinbach G; 73 Joe Thomas T; 74 Phil Trautwein T; 77 Floyd Womack T; Defensive linemen: 90 Kenyon Coleman DE; 69 C. J. Mosley DE; 92 Shaun Rogers NT; 71 Ahtyba Rubin NT; 98 Robaire Smith DE; 99 Corey Williams DE	Linebackers: 50 Eric Barton ILB; 96 David Bowens OLB; 54 Blake Costanzo ILB; 51 Alex Hall OLB; 52 D'Qwell Jackson ILB; 56 Kaluka Maiava ILB; 57 David Veikune OLB; 94 Leon Williams OLB; 95 Kamerion Wimbley OLB; Defensive backs: 20 Mike Adams FS; 26 Abram Elam SS; 29 Marquis Floyd CB; 25 Coye Francies CB; 30 Gerard Lawson CB; 22 Brandon McDonald CB; 21 Brodney Pool FS; 23 Hank Poteat CB; 33 DeAngelo Smith S; 27 Nick Sorensen SS; 24 Eric Wright CB; Special teams: 4 Phil Dawson K; 64 Ryan Pontbriand LS; 15 Dave Zastudil P	Reserve lists: 18 Donté Stallworth WR (Susp.); 12 Syndric Steptoe WR (IR); 72 Ryan Tucker T/G (IR); Practice Squad: 49 Marcus Benard ILB; 59 Titus Brown OLB; 60 Keith Grennan DE; 79 Corey Hilliard OT; 34 Chris Jennings RB; 9 Lance Leggett WR; 75 Pat Murray G; 91 Brian Schaefering DE; 53 Active, 3 Inactive, 8 PS

=== Final roster ===
2009 Cleveland Browns roster
Quarterbacks (QB): 3 Derek Anderson; 5 Brett Ratliff; Running backs (RB): 29 Thomas Brown; 35 Jerome Harrison; 34 Chris Jennings; 47 Lawrence Vickers FB; Wide receivers (WR): 85 Jake Allen; 16 Josh Cribbs; 87 Mike Furrey; 11 Mohamed Massaquoi; 80 Brian Robiskie; 88 Chansi Stuckey; Tight ends (TE): 83 Greg Estandia; 86 Michael Gaines; 89 Evan Moore; 84 Robert Royal	Offensive linemen (OL): 66 Hank Fraley C; 70 Rex Hadnot G; 55 Alex Mack C; 78 John St. Clair T; 65 Eric Steinbach G; 73 Joe Thomas T; 77 Floyd Womack G; 68 Billy Yates G; Defensive linemen (DL): 62 Titus Adams DE; 90 Kenyon Coleman DE; 67 Derreck Robinson DE; 71 Ahtyba Rubin NT; 91 Brian Schaefering DE; 98 Robaire Smith DE; 99 Corey Williams DE	Linebackers (LB): 58 Marcus Benard OLB; 96 David Bowens OLB; 59 Titus Brown OLB; 54 Blake Costanzo ILB; 51 Alex Hall OLB; 56 Kaluka Maiava ILB; 53 Matt Roth OLB; 93 Jason Trusnik ILB; 95 Kamerion Wimbley OLB; Defensive backs (DB): 20 Mike Adams FS; 26 Abram Elam SS; 25 Coye Francies CB; 30 Gerard Lawson CB; 22 Brandon McDonald CB; 23 Hank Poteat CB; 38 Ramzee Robinson CB; 27 Nick Sorensen SS; 41 Ray Ventrone FS; 24 Eric Wright CB; Special teams (ST): 4 Phil Dawson K; 2 Reggie Hodges P; 64 Ryan Pontbriand LS	Practice squad: 79 Jason Capizzi T; 44 Jed Collins FB; 97 Alex Field DE; 60 Keith Grennan DE (IR); 61 Jonathan Lewis NT; 75 Pat Murray G; 33 Matterral Richardson CB; Reserve: 50 Eric Barton LB (IR); 28 James Davis RB (IR); 82 Steve Heiden TE (IR); 52 D'Qwell Jackson LB (IR); 31 Jamal Lewis RB (IR); 69 C. J. Mosley DE (IR); 21 Brodney Pool S (IR); 10 Brady Quinn QB (IR); 92 Shaun Rogers NT (IR); 18 Donté Stallworth WR (Susp.); 12 Syndric Steptoe WR (IR); 72 Ryan Tucker T (IR); 57 David Veikune DE (IR); 15 Dave Zastudil P (IR); Rookies in italics 53 active, 15 reserve, 6 practice squad

== Preseason ==
=== Schedule ===
Week	Date	Opponent	Result	Record	Game site	NFL.com recap
1	August 15	at Green Bay Packers	L 0–17	0–1	Lambeau Field	Recap
2	August 22	Detroit Lions	W 27–10	1–1	Cleveland Browns Stadium	Recap
3	August 29	Tennessee Titans	W 23–17	2–1	Cleveland Browns Stadium	Recap
4	September 3	at Chicago Bears	L 23–26	2–2	Soldier Field	Recap

=== Releases ===
On September 4 and 5, the Browns released the following players to get down to the 53-player limit: S Hamza Abdullah, FB Charles Ali, CB Brandon Anderson, QB Richard Bartel, CB Tra Battle, LB Beau Bell, T Branndon Braxton, LB Titus Brown, C Dustin Fry, RB Noah Herron, DT Adam Hoppel, WR Paul Hubbard, CB Corey Ivy, RB Chris Jennings, WR Lance Leggett, G Pat Murray, WR Jordan Norwood, WR David Patten, G Kurt Quarterman, DE Brian Schaefering, G Isaac Sowells, DE Santonio Thomas and TE Aaron Walker.

=== Captains selected ===
On September 9, the team elected six players to be captains. RB Jamal Lewis and T Joe Thomas were chosen as offensive captains, LB D'Qwell Jackson and LB Eric Barton as defensive captains, and KR Josh Cribbs and K Phil Dawson as special teams captains.

== Regular season ==
=== Schedule ===
Week	Date	Opponent	Result	Record	Game site	NFL.com recap
1	September 13	Minnesota Vikings	**L** 20–34	0–1	Cleveland Browns Stadium	Recap
2	September 20	at Denver Broncos	**L** 6–27	0–2	Invesco Field at Mile High	Recap
3	September 27	at **Baltimore Ravens**	**L** 3–34	0–3	M&T Bank Stadium	Recap
4	October 4	**Cincinnati Bengals**	**L** 20–23 (OT)	0–4	Cleveland Browns Stadium	Recap
5	October 11	at Buffalo Bills	**W** 6–3	1–4	Ralph Wilson Stadium	Recap
6	October 18	at **Pittsburgh Steelers**	**L** 14–27	1–5	Heinz Field	Recap
7	October 25	Green Bay Packers	**L** 3–31	1–6	Cleveland Browns Stadium	Recap
8	November 1	at Chicago Bears	**L** 6–30	1–7	Soldier Field	Recap
9	Bye					
10	November 16	**Baltimore Ravens**	**L** 0–16	1–8	Cleveland Browns Stadium	Recap
11	November 22	at Detroit Lions	**L** 37–38	1–9	Ford Field	Recap
12	November 29	at **Cincinnati Bengals**	**L** 7–16	1–10	Paul Brown Stadium	Recap
13	December 6	San Diego Chargers	**L** 23–30	1–11	Cleveland Browns Stadium	Recap
14	December 10	**Pittsburgh Steelers**	**W** 13–6	2–11	Cleveland Browns Stadium	Recap
15	December 20	at Kansas City Chiefs	**W** 41–34	3–11	Arrowhead Stadium	Recap
16	December 27	Oakland Raiders	**W** 23–9	4–11	Cleveland Browns Stadium	Recap
17	January 3	Jacksonville Jaguars	**W** 23–17	5–11	Cleveland Browns Stadium	Recap

Note: Intra-divisional opponents are in bold text.

=== Standings ===
AFC North
	W	L	T	PCT	DIV	CONF	PF	PA	STK
^{(4)} Cincinnati Bengals	10	6	0	.625	6–0	7–5	305	291	L1
^{(6)} Baltimore Ravens	9	7	0	.563	3–3	7–5	391	261	W1
Pittsburgh Steelers	9	7	0	.563	2–4	6–6	368	324	W3
Cleveland Browns	5	11	0	.313	1–5	5–7	245	375	W4

=== Game summaries ===
==== Week 1: vs. Minnesota Vikings ====
Week 1: Minnesota Vikings at Cleveland Browns – Game summary

Quarter	1	2	3	4	Total
**Vikings**	3	7	14	10	**34**
Browns	3	10	0	7	**20**

at Cleveland Browns Stadium, Cleveland, Ohio

- Date: September 13
- Game time: 12:00 p.m.
- Game weather: Sunny, 70 °F (21 °C)
- Game attendance: 70,560
- Referee: John Parry (132)
- TV announcers (Fox): Thom Brennaman, Brian Billick and Charissa Thompson
- Recap, Game Book

Game information

**First quarter**

- CLE – Phil Dawson 37-yard field goal, 11:28. Browns 3–0. **Drive: 8 plays, 31 yards, 3:32.**
- MIN – Ryan Longwell 21-yard field goal, 0:03. Tied 3–3. **Drive: 12 plays, 46 yards, 6:52.**

**Second quarter**

- MIN – Adrian Peterson 1-yard run (Ryan Longwell kick), 11:09. Vikings 10–3. **Drive: 4 plays, 23 yards, 1:47.**
- CLE – Phil Dawson 20-yard field goal, 5:57. Vikings 10–6. **Drive: 9 plays, 73 yards, 5:12.**
- CLE – Joshua Cribbs 67-yard punt return (Phil Dawson kick), 1:30. Browns 13–10.

**Third quarter**

- MIN – Adrian Peterson 1-yard run (Ryan Longwell kick), 10:07. Vikings 17–13. **Drive: 9 plays, 55 yards, 4:53.**
- MIN – Percy Harvin 6-yard pass from Brett Favre (Ryan Longwell kick), 1:06. Vikings 24–13. **Drive: 13 plays, 82 yards, 7:32.**

**Fourth quarter**

- MIN – Ryan Longwell 37-yard field goal, 6:55. Vikings 27–13. **Drive: 6 plays, 14 yards, 3:06.**
- MIN – Adrian Peterson 64-yard run (Ryan Longwell kick), 5:58. Vikings 34–13. **Drive: 1 play, 64 yards, 0:13.**
- CLE – Robert Royal 26-yard pass from Brady Quinn (Phil Dawson kick), 0:28. Vikings 34–20. **Drive: 9 plays, 80 yards, 2:35.**

**Top passers**

- MIN – Brett Favre – 14/21, 110 yards, TD
- CLE – Brady Quinn – 21/35, 205 yards, TD, INT

**Top rushers**

- MIN – Adrian Peterson – 25 rushes, 180 yards, 3 TD
- CLE – Jamal Lewis – 11 rushes, 57 yards

**Top receivers**

- MIN – Percy Harvin – 3 rec, 36 yards, TD
- CLE – Robert Royal – 4 rec, 60 yards, TD

The Browns opened their season at home against the Minnesota Vikings trying to improve on their 4–12 record from last season. After trading field goals in the first quarter, RB Adrian Peterson scored the first touchdown of the game, giving Minnesota a 10–3 lead. But K Phil Dawson kicked his second field goal and WR Josh Cribbs returned a punt for a touchdown and the Browns took a 13–10 lead into halftime. However, the second half was controlled completely by the Vikings, with QB Brett Favre connecting with WR Percy Harvin for Favre's first touchdown pass as a Viking. In the 4th quarter, QB Brady Quinn completed a touchdown pass to TE Robert Royal, the first touchdown by Cleveland's offense since the 4th quarter of Week 11 in 2008, ending a span of 416 offensive plays without a touchdown.

With the loss, Cleveland fell to 0–1. As of 2025, this marks the last time the Browns hosted the Vikings in Cleveland.

==== Week 2: at Denver Broncos ====
Week 2: Cleveland Browns at Denver Broncos – Game summary

Quarter	1	2	3	4	Total
Browns	6	0	0	0	**6**
**Broncos**	7	3	3	14	**27**

at Invesco Field at Mile High, Denver, Colorado

- Game time: 4:15 pm EDT/2:15 pm MDT
- Game weather: 82 °F (28 °C) (Partly Cloudy)
- Game attendance: 73,931
- Referee: Pete Morelli
- TV announcers (CBS): Bill Macatee and Steve Beuerlein

Game information
**First quarter**
- 12:25 CLE – Dawson 22-yard field goal 3–0 CLE
- 8:07 DEN – Scheffler 2-yard pass from Orton (Prater kick) 7–3 DEN
- 1:53 CLE – Dawson 47-yard field goal 7–6 DEN

**Second quarter**

- 11:45 DEN – Prater 23-yard field goal 10–6 DEN

**Third quarter**

- 10:43 DEN – Prater 38-yard field goal 13–6 DEN

**Fourth quarter**

- 12:22 DEN – Hillis 2-yard run (Prater kick) 20–6 DEN
- 8:35 DEN – Buckhalter 45-yard run (Prater kick) 27–6 DEN

Hoping to rebound from their home loss to the Vikings, the Browns flew to Invesco Field at Mile High for a Week 2 duel with the Denver Broncos. After recovering a fumble on the opening kickoff, the Browns started with a short field but couldn't capitalize, settling for a 22-yard field goal by kicker Phil Dawson. Broncos quarterback Kyle Orton completed a 2-yard touchdown pass to tight end Tony Scheffler for the game's first touchdown, and after a 47-yard field goal by Cleveland, the game was 7–6 after the first quarter. However, Cleveland's offensive struggles continued. Meanwhile, in the second and third quarter, kicker Matt Prater gave Denver a 23-yard and a 38-yard field goal. In the fourth quarter, the Broncos took control with touchdown runs by Peyton Hillis and Correll Buckhalter.

With the loss, the Browns fell to 0–2.

==== Week 3: at Baltimore Ravens ====
Week 3: Cleveland Browns at Baltimore Ravens – Game summary

Quarter	1	2	3	4	Total
Browns	0	0	0	3	**3**
**Ravens**	10	10	7	7	**34**

at M&T Bank Stadium, Baltimore, Maryland

- Game time: 1:00 pm EDT
- Game weather: 72 °F (22 °C) (Partly Cloudy)
- Game attendance: 70,950
- Referee: Terry McAulay
- TV announcers (CBS): Gus Johnson and Steve Tasker

Game information
**First quarter**
- 10:19 BAL – McGahee 7-yard run (Hauschka kick) 7–0 BAL
- 1:21 BAL – Hauschka 36-yard field goal 10–0 BAL

**Second quarter**

- 5:42 BAL – Hauschka 33-yard field goal 13–0 BAL
- 1:01 BAL – McGahee 15-yard run (Hauschka kick) 20–0 BAL

**Third quarter**

- 7:38 BAL – Rice 9-yard run (Hauschka kick) 27–0 BAL

**Fourth quarter**

- 15:00 CLE – Cundiff 29-yard field goal 27–3 BAL
- 8:18 BAL – Mason 72-yard pass from Flacco (Hauschka kick) 34–3 BAL

Hoping to rebound from their road loss to the Broncos, the Browns flew to M&T Bank Stadium for a Week 3 AFC North duel with the Baltimore Ravens. Cleveland trailed early in the first quarter as Ravens running back Willis McGahee got a 7-yard touchdown run, followed by kicker Steven Hauschka getting a 36-yard field goal. The Browns' deficit increased in the second quarter as Hauschka nailed a 33-yard field goal, while McGahee got a 15-yard touchdown run.

In the third quarter, things continued to get worse for the Browns as running back Ray Rice got a 9-yard touchdown run. In the fourth quarter, Cleveland managed to get on the board as kicker Billy Cundiff made a 29-yard field goal. Afterwards, Baltimore closed out the game as quarterback Joe Flacco completed a 72-yard touchdown pass to wide receiver Derrick Mason.

With the loss, the Browns fell to 0–3.

Starting quarterback Brady Quinn (6 of 8, 34 yards, 1 INT) was benched after a dismal first half performance, while Derek Anderson (11 of 19, 92 yards, 3 INTs) did not perform much better.

==== Week 4: vs. Cincinnati Bengals ====
Week 4: Cincinnati Bengals at Cleveland Browns – Game summary

Quarter	1	2	3	4	OT	Total
**Bengals**	7	7	0	6	3	**23**
Browns	0	7	7	6	0	**20**

at Cleveland Browns Stadium, Cleveland, Ohio

- Game time: 1:00 pm EDT
- Game weather: 58 °F (14 °C) (Cloudy)
- Game attendance: 69,844
- Referee: Scott Green
- TV announcers (CBS): Ian Eagle and Rich Gannon

Game information
**First quarter**
- 0:40 CIN – Ochocinco 5-yard pass from Palmer (Graham kick) 7–0 CIN

**Second quarter**

- 14:26 CIN – Geathers 75-yard fumble return (Graham kick) 14–0 CIN
- 1:33 CLE – Heiden 1-yard pass from Anderson (Cundiff kick) 14–7 CIN

**Third quarter**

- 1:44 CLE – Anderson 1-yard run (Cundiff kick) 14–14

**Fourth quarter**

- 15:00 CLE – Cundiff 26-yard field goal 17–14 CLE
- 6:38 CLE – Cundiff 31-yard field goal 20–14 CLE
- 2:02 CIN – Ochocinco 2-yard pass from Palmer (kick blocked) 20–20

**Overtime**

- 0:07 CIN – Graham 31-yard field goal 23–20 CIN

Still looking for their first win of the season, the Browns went home for a Week 4 AFC North duel with the Cincinnati Bengals in Round 1 of 2009's Battle of Ohio. Due to quarterback Brady Quinn's poor performance in the season thus far, head coach Eric Mangini named quarterback Derek Anderson the starter.

Cleveland trailed early in the first quarter as Bengals quarterback Carson Palmer completed a 5-yard touchdown pass to wide receiver Chad Ochocinco. The Browns continued to struggle in the second quarter as defensive end Robert Geathers returned a fumble 75 yards for a touchdown. Cleveland responded with Anderson completing a 1-yard touchdown pass to tight end Steve Heiden.

The Browns tied the game in the third quarter with Anderson's 1-yard touchdown run. Afterwards, Cleveland took the lead in the fourth quarter with a 26-yard and a 31-yard field goal from kicker Billy Cundiff. However, Cincinnati answered with Palmer hooking up with Ochocinco again on a 2-yard touchdown run (with a blocked PAT). In overtime, both teams went back and forth with their possessions. In the end, the Bengals emerged victorious with kicker Shayne Graham kicking the game-winning 31-yard field goal.

With the loss, the Browns fell to 0–4.

==== WR Edwards traded ====
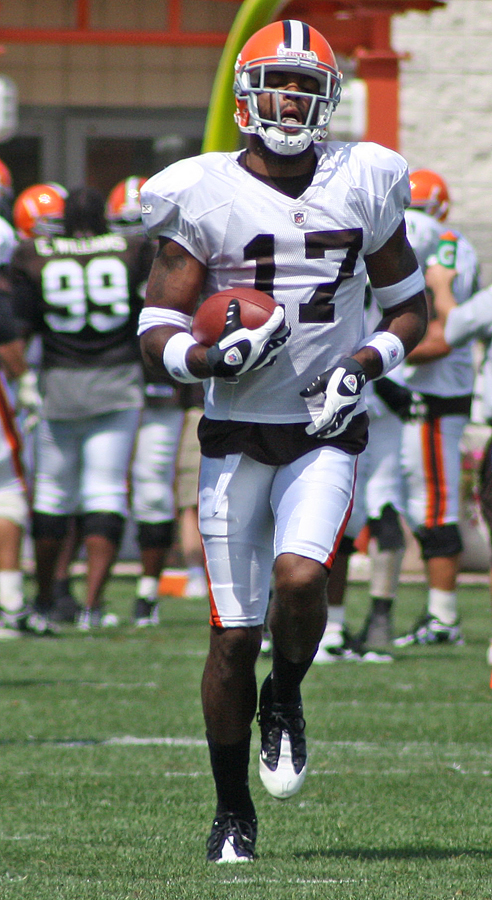
Edwards (shown in 2009 training camp) was traded to the New York Jets during the season.

On October 7, the Browns traded WR Braylon Edwards to the New York Jets for WR Chansi Stuckey, LB Jason Trusnik, and third- and fifth-round selections in the 2010 NFL draft. The third-round selection would have become a second-round selection if Edwards met certain performance criteria with the Jets, but he did not.

==== Week 5: at Buffalo Bills ====
Week 5: Cleveland Browns at Buffalo Bills – Game summary

Quarter	1	2	3	4	Total
**Browns**	0	3	0	3	**6**
Bills	0	0	3	0	**3**

at Ralph Wilson Stadium, Orchard Park, New York

- Game time: 1:00 pm EDT
- Game weather: 47 °F (8 °C) (Mostly Sunny)
- Game attendance: 70,526
- Referee: Jerome Boger
- TV announcers (CBS): Don Criqui and Randy Cross

Game information
**Second quarter**
- 7:31 CLE – Cundiff 24-yard field goal 3–0 CLE

**Third quarter**

- 10:15 BUF – Lindell 36-yard field goal 3–3

**Fourth quarter**

- 0:26 CLE – Cundiff 18-yard field goal 6–3 CLE

After a heartbreaking loss to the Bengals, the Browns headed to Buffalo, the site of their last win in Week 11 of the 2008 season, trying to avoid tying a franchise record 11 straight losses. In very windy conditions, the Browns' hero was punter Dave Zastudil who pinned the Bills within their 5-yard line three times. After trading field goals in the 2nd and 3rd quarters, the Browns recovered a fumble on a punt return by WR Roscoe Parrish, and kicker Billy Cundiff secured the victory with a short field goal. The Browns won despite QB Derek Anderson completing only 2 of 17 passes (11.8%) for 23 yards, setting a record for lowest completion percentage in a win since the AFL-NFL merger. This also marked Eric Mangini's first win as head coach of the Browns.

With the win, the Browns improved to 1–4. Zastudil was named the AFC special teams player of the week.

==== Week 6: at Pittsburgh Steelers ====
Week 6: Cleveland Browns at Pittsburgh Steelers – Game summary

Quarter	1	2	3	4	Total
Browns	0	7	7	0	**14**
**Steelers**	0	17	7	3	**27**

at Heinz Field, Pittsburgh, Pennsylvania

- Game time: 1:00 pm EDT
- Game weather: 41 °F (5 °C) (Cloudy)
- Game attendance: 64,398
- Referee: Walt Anderson
- TV announcers (CBS): Kevin Harlan and Solomon Wilcots

Game information
**Second quarter**
- 11:35 PIT – Miller 8-yard pass from Roethlisberger (Reed kick) 7–0 PIT
- 4:38 PIT – Ward 52-yard pass from Roethlisberger (Reed kick) 14–0 PIT
- 4:28 CLE – Cribbs 98-yard kickoff return (Cundiff kick) 14–7 PIT
- 0:10 PIT – Reed 32-yard field goal 17–7 PIT

**Third quarter**

- 11:43 CLE – Vickers 1-yard pass from Anderson (Cundiff kick) 17–14 PIT
- 8:39 PIT – Mendenhall 2-yard run (Reed kick) 24–14 PIT

**Fourth quarter**

- 5:47 PIT – Reed 39-yard field goal 27–14 PIT

After securing their first win of the season, the Browns went on the road to take on their archrival Pittsburgh Steelers. The Browns came into the game having lost their last 11 games against the Steelers. The Steelers struck first with two touchdown passes from Ben Roethlisberger in the 2nd quarter. Josh Cribbs ran a kickoff back 98 yards for a touchdown to get the Browns within 7. However, the Browns could never close the gap and fell to the Steelers, 27–14.

With their 12 consecutive loss to the Steelers and their 7th straight loss in Pittsburgh, the Browns fell to 1–5.

==== Week 7: vs. Green Bay Packers ====
Week 7: Green Bay Packers at Cleveland Browns – Game summary

Quarter	1	2	3	4	Total
**Packers**	0	21	3	7	**31**
Browns	0	3	0	0	**3**

at Cleveland Browns Stadium, Cleveland, Ohio

- Game time: 1:00 pm EDT
- Game weather: 50 °F (10 °C) (Sunny)
- Game attendance: 69,797
- Referee: Don Carey
- TV announcers (Fox): Ron Pitts and John Lynch

Game information
**Second quarter**
- 14:58 CLE – Cundiff 22-yard field goal 3–0 CLE
- 12:11 GB – Havner 45-yard pass from Rodgers (Crosby kick) 7–3 GB
- 7:01 GB – Driver 71-yard pass from Rodgers (Crosby kick) 14–3 GB
- 1:56 GB – Grant 1-yard run (Crosby kick) 21–3 GB

**Third quarter**

- 3:34 GB – Crosby 18-yard field goal 24–3 GB

**Fourth quarter**

- 9:42 GB – Jones 5-yard pass from Rodgers (Crosby kick) 31–3 GB

Hoping to rebound from their road loss to the Steelers, the Browns went home for a Week 7 interconference duel with the Green Bay Packers. After a scoreless first quarter, Cleveland began the second quarter with kicker Billy Cundiff's 22-yard field goal. However, the Packers took charge with quarterback Aaron Rodgers completing a 45-yard touchdown pass to tight end Spencer Havner and a 71-yard touchdown pass to wide receiver Donald Driver, followed by a 1-yard touchdown run by running back Ryan Grant.

Afterwards, Green Bay pulled away in the second half with kicker Mason Crosby booting an 18-yard field goal in the third quarter and Rodgers finding wide receiver James Jones on a 5-yard touchdown pass.

With the loss, the Browns stumbled to 1–6.

==== Week 8: at Chicago Bears ====
Week 8: Cleveland Browns at Chicago Bears – Game summary

Quarter	1	2	3	4	Total
Browns	0	0	6	0	**6**
**Bears**	6	10	7	7	**30**

at Soldier Field, Chicago, Illinois

- Game time: 1:00 pm EST/12:00 pm CST
- Game weather: 50 °F (10 °C) (Mostly Cloudy)
- Game attendance: 62,262
- Referee: Alberto Riveron
- TV announcers (CBS): Kevin Harlan and Solomon Wilcots

Game information
**First quarter**
- 2:25 CHI – Gould 37-yard field goal 3–0 CHI
- 1:18 CHI – Gould 29-yard field goal 6–0 CHI

**Second quarter**

- 8:48 CHI – Gould 32-yard field goal 9–0 CHI
- 2:00 CHI – Forte 1-yard run (Gould kick) 16–0 CHI

**Third quarter**

- 10:35 CLE – Anderson 1-yard run 16–6 CHI
- 1:49 CHI – Forte 10-yard run (Gould kick) 23–6 CHI

**Fourth quarter**

- 3:25 CHI – Tillman 21-yard interception return (Gould kick) 30–6 CHI

Trying to snap a two-game losing streak, the Browns flew to Soldier Field for a Week 8 interconference duel with the Chicago Bears. The Browns' defense held up well early, limiting the Bears to three field goals by kicker Robbie Gould (a 37-yard and a 29-yard in the first quarter and a 32-yard in the second). However, the Browns could not manage to get on the board and Chicago RB Matt Forte scored on a 1-yard run, putting the Browns down 16 at the half. The Browns struck first in the third quarter on a one-yard run by QB Derek Anderson, but the PAT was blocked. Forte scored again in the third with a 10-yard touchdown run and the Bears put the Browns away with a 21-yard interception return for a touchdown by CB Charles Tillman in the fourth quarter. Late in the fourth, Derek Anderson was benched for Brady Quinn after going 6 of 17 (35.2%) for 76 yards and 2 interceptions.

With the loss, the Browns went into their bye week at 1–7.

==== GM Kokinis fired ====
On November 2, the Browns fired general manager George Kokinis after getting off to a disappointing 1–7 start. The Browns' statement said that Kokinis "is no longer actively involved with the organization." Owner Randy Lerner reportedly asked for his resignation, and when Kokinis refused, sought a dismissal "for cause." Head coach Eric Mangini was told by Lerner that his job was safe for the moment.

==== Week 10: vs. Baltimore Ravens ====
Week 10: Baltimore Ravens at Cleveland Browns – Game summary

Quarter	1	2	3	4	Total
**Ravens**	0	0	16	0	**16**
Browns	0	0	0	0	**0**

at Cleveland Browns Stadium, Cleveland, Ohio

- Game time: 8:30 pm EST
- Game weather: 46 °F (8 °C) (Chilly)
- Game attendance: 69,023
- Referee: Carl Cheffers
- TV announcers (ESPN): Mike Tirico, Ron Jaworski, Jon Gruden and Michele Tafoya

Game information

**First quarter**

- No scoring plays

**Second quarter**

- No scoring plays

**Third quarter**

- BAL – Ray Rice 13-yard run (Steven Hauschka kick), 12:28. Ravens 7–0. **Drive: 4 plays, 59 yards, 1:34.**
- BAL – Dawan Landry 48-yard interception return (kick blocked), 12:11. Ravens 13–0.
- BAL – Steven Hauschka 44-yard field goal, 7:20. Ravens 16–0. **Drive: 4 plays, -1 yards, 2:01.**

**Fourth quarter**

- No scoring plays

**Top passers**

- BAL – Joe Flacco – 13/18, 155 yards
- CLE – Brady Quinn – 13/31, 99 yards, 2 INT

**Top rushers**

- BAL – Ray Rice – 20 rushes, 89 yards, TD
- CLE – Jamal Lewis – 10 rushes, 36 yards

**Top receivers**

- BAL – Derrick Mason – 3 receptions, 78 yards
- CLE – Mike Furrey – 6 receptions, 30 yards

The Browns came out of their bye week with Brady Quinn as the starting quarterback again and looking to turn around their disappointing season. They hosted the Baltimore Ravens on Monday Night Football. Both teams played a scoreless first half, the first scoreless half in the NFL this season and only the ninth ever in 620 Monday Night Football games. The Ravens took over in the third with two touchdowns in 15 seconds (a 13-yard touchdown run from running back Ray Rice and safety Dawan Landry's 48-yard interception return for a touchdown). Kicker Steven Hauschka added a 44-yard field goal and the Browns could not score. This was the Browns' first shutout loss of the year.

With the loss, the Browns fell to 1–8.

==== Week 11: at Detroit Lions ====
Week 11: Cleveland Browns at Detroit Lions – Game summary

Quarter	1	2	3	4	Total
Browns	24	3	2	8	**37**
**Lions**	10	14	7	7	**38**

at Ford Field, Detroit, Michigan

- Date: November 22
- Game time: 1:00 p.m. EST
- Game weather: Indoors (dome)
- Game attendance: 43,170
- Referee: Terry McAulay
- TV announcers (CBS): Don Criqui and Randy Cross
- Recap, Game Book

Game information

**First quarter**

- CLE – Phil Dawson 44-yard field goal, 11:28. Browns 3–0. **Drive: 9 plays, 48 yards, 3:32.**
- DET – Jason Hanson 31-yard field goal, 9:13. Tied 3–3. **Drive: 5 plays, 68 yards, 2:15.**
- CLE – Mohamed Massaquoi 59-yard pass from Brady Quinn (Phil Dawson kick), 8:56. Browns 10–3. **Drive: 1 play, 59 yards, 0:17.**
- CLE – Chansi Stuckey 40-yard pass from Brady Quinn (Phil Dawson kick), 4:03. Browns 17–3. **Drive: 7 plays, 72 yards, 3:33.**
- CLE – Josh Cribbs 4-yard pass from Brady Quinn (Phil Dawson kick), 2:52. Browns 24–3. **Drive: 2 plays, 6 yards, 0:47.**
- DET – Aaron Brown 26-yard pass from Matthew Stafford (Jason Hanson kick), 0:30. Browns 24–10. **Drive: 5 plays, 78 yards, 2:22.**

**Second quarter**

- DET – Kevin Smith 25-yard pass from Matthew Stafford (Jason Hanson kick), 11:44. Browns 24–17. **Drive: 7 plays, 61 yards, 2:27.**
- DET – Calvin Johnson 75-yard pass from Matthew Stafford (Jason Hanson kick), 5:01. Tied 24–24. **Drive: 4 plays, 94 yards, 2:45.**
- CLE – Phil Dawson 29-yard field goal, 0:02. Browns 27–24. **Drive: 14 plays, 69 yards, 4:59.**

**Third quarter**

- DET – Will Heller 1-yard pass from Matthew Stafford (Jason Hanson kick), 2:47. Lions 31–27. **Drive: 10 plays, 84 yards, 5:03.**
- CLE – Penalty on Matthew Stafford enforced in the end zone for a safety, 0:41. Lions 31–29.

**Fourth quarter**

- CLE – Michael Gaines 2-yard pass from Brady Quinn (Jamal Lewis run), 5:44. Browns 37–31. **Drive: 14 plays, 75 yards, 6:47.**
- DET – Brandon Pettigrew 1-yard pass from Matthew Stafford (Jason Hanson kick), 0:00. Lions 38–37. **Drive: 10 plays, 88 yards, 1:46.**

**Top passers**

- CLE – Brady Quinn – 21/33, 304 yards, 4 TD
- DET – Matthew Stafford – 26/43, 422 yards, 5 TD, 2 INT

**Top rushers**

- CLE – Jamal Lewis – 24 rushes, 75 yards
- DET – Kevin Smith – 12 rushes, 45 yards

**Top receivers**

- CLE – Mohammed Massaquoi – 5 receptions, 115 yards, TD
- DET – Calvin Johnson – 7 receptions, 161 yards, TD

Looking to snap a four-game losing streak, the 1–8 Browns flew to Ford Field for a Week 11 interconference duel with the 1–8 Detroit Lions. Both teams began the game with field goals, as Cleveland kicker Phil Dawson made a 44-yard field goal while Lions kicker Jason Hanson got a 31-yard field goal. Afterwards, the Browns' offense exploded as quarterback Brady Quinn completed a 59-yard touchdown pass to rookie wide receiver Mohamed Massaquoi, a 40-yard touchdown pass to wide receiver Chansi Stuckey and a 4-yard touchdown pass to wide receiver Josh Cribbs. Detroit answered with quarterback Matthew Stafford completing a 26-yard touchdown pass to running back Aaron Brown. The Lions tied the game in the second quarter as Stafford hooked up with running back Kevin Smith on a 25-yard touchdown pass, followed by a 75-yard touchdown pass to wide receiver Calvin Johnson. Afterwards, Cleveland ended the half with Dawson nailing a 29-yard field goal.

After Detroit took the lead in the third quarter with Stafford's 1-yard touchdown pass to tight end Will Heller, the Browns picked up a safety after Stafford was called for intentional grounding from his own end zone. In the fourth quarter, Cleveland regained the lead with Quinn's 2-yard touchdown pass to tight end Michael Gaines (followed by running back Jamal Lewis getting a 2-point conversion run). The Lions took over, and with no time left, Browns safety Brodney Pool intercepted the ball. However, cornerback Hank Poteat was flagged for pass interference in the end zone. Since the game cannot end on a defensive penalty, Detroit was given one untimed down from the Browns' 1-yard line and Stafford completed the game-winning touchdown pass to tight end Brandon Pettigrew.

With the loss in the 1–8 battle, Cleveland fell to 1–9, assuring a last-place finish in their division.

==== Week 12: at Cincinnati Bengals ====
Week 12: Cleveland Browns at Cincinnati Bengals – Game summary

Quarter	1	2	3	4	Total
Browns	0	0	7	0	**7**
**Bengals**	3	10	3	0	**16**

at Paul Brown Stadium, Cincinnati, Ohio

- Game time: 1:00 pm EST
- Game weather: 59 °F (15 °C) (Partly Cloudy)
- Game attendance: 64,553
- Referee: Mike Carey
- TV announcers (CBS): Ian Eagle and Rich Gannon

Game information
**First quarter**
- 3:11 CIN – Graham 37-yard field goal 3–0 CIN

**Second quarter**

- 1:18 CIN – Foschi 4-yard pass from Palmer (Graham kick) 10–0 CIN
- 0:00 CIN – Graham 53-yard field goal 13–0 CIN

**Third quarter**

- 6:57 CLE – Quinn 9-yard run (Dawson kick) 13–7 CIN
- 0:54 CIN – Graham 28-yard field goal 16–7 CIN

The Browns headed to Cincinnati to face their in-state rivals in Week 12. The Bengals struck first with 2 field goals by Shayne Graham and a touchdown reception by J. P. Foschi in the first half. Brady Quinn had a touchdown run in the third, but another Bengals field goal and defense put the Browns away.

With the loss, the Browns fell to 1–10 and were officially eliminated from postseason contention for the 7th straight year.

==== Week 13: vs. San Diego Chargers ====
Week 13: San Diego Chargers at Cleveland Browns – Game summary

Quarter	1	2	3	4	Total
**Chargers**	10	3	14	3	**30**
Browns	7	0	0	16	**23**

at Cleveland Browns Stadium, Cleveland, Ohio

- Game time: 4:05 pm EST
- Game weather: 34 °F (1 °C) (Sunny)
- Game attendance: 67,978
- Referee: Walt Coleman
- TV announcers (CBS): Kevin Harlan and Solomon Wilcots

Game information
**First quarter**
- 8:43 CLE – Massaquoi 11-yard pass from Quinn (Dawson kick) 7–0 CLE
- 3:03 SD – Kaeding 32-yard field goal 7–3 CLE
- 0:58 SD – Tolbert 66-yard pass from Rivers (Kaeding kick) 10–7 SD

**Second quarter**

- 0:02 SD – Kaeding 42-yard field goal 13–7 SD

**Third quarter**

- 10:41 SD – Sproles 31-yard pass from Rivers (Kaeding kick) 20–7 SD
- 6:22 SD – Tomlinson 4-yard run (Kaeding kick) 27–7 SD

**Fourth quarter**

- 9:15 CLE – Harrison 8-yard pass from Quinn (Dawson kick) 27–14 SD
- 4:12 SD – Kaeding 22-yard field goal 30–14 SD
- 1:55 CLE – Harrison 8-yard pass from Quinn 30–20 SD
- 0:39 CLE – Dawson 49-yard field goal 30–23 SD

The Browns stayed home in Week 13 to take on the San Diego Chargers. The Browns struck first with an 11-yard touchdown reception by Mohamed Massaquoi. The Chargers took the lead back in the first on a field goal by Nate Kaeding and a long touchdown reception by Mike Tolbert. San Diego scored 17 more in the second and third, seemingly putting the game out of reach. The Browns managed to get within a touchdown but their comeback ran out of time.

With the loss, the Browns fell to 1–11.

==== Week 14: vs. Pittsburgh Steelers ====
Week 14: Pittsburgh Steelers at Cleveland Browns – Game summary

Quarter	1	2	3	4	Total
Steelers	0	3	3	0	**6**
**Browns**	3	10	0	0	**13**

at Cleveland Browns Stadium, Cleveland, Ohio

- Game time: 8:20 pm EST
- Game weather: 6 °F (−14 °C) (Clear, very Windy, −15 °F (−26 °C) wind chill)
- Game attendance: 69,009
- Referee: Ron Winter
- TV announcers (NFL Network): Bob Papa and Matt Millen

Game information

**First quarter**

- CLE – Phil Dawson 29-yard field goal, 3:47. Browns 3–0. **Drive: 4 plays, 8 yards, 1:13.**

**Second quarter**

- CLE – Phil Dawson 29-yard field goal, 7:20. Browns 6–0. **Drive: 7 plays, 36 yards, 2:56.**
- CLE – Chris Jennings 10-yard run (Phil Dawson kick), 0:41. Browns 13–0. **Drive: 8 plays, 74 yards, 3:35.**
- PIT – Jeff Reed 27-yard field goal, 0:00. Browns 13–3. **Drive: 6 plays, 33 yards, 0:41.**

**Third quarter**

- PIT – Jeff Reed 42-yard field goal, 0:08. Browns 13–6. **Drive: 7 plays, 49 yards, 3:45.**

**Fourth quarter**

- No scoring plays

**Top passers**

- PIT – Ben Roethlisberger – 18/32, 201 yards
- CLE – Brady Quinn – 6/19, 90 yards

**Top rushers**

- PIT – Rashard Mendenhall – 16 rushes, 53 yards
- CLE – Joshua Cribbs – 8 rushes, 87 yards

**Top receivers**

- PIT – Santonio Holmes – 6 receptions, 93 yards
- CLE – Mohamed Massaquoi – 1 reception, 37 yards

The Browns hosted the rival Pittsburgh Steelers on a night with subzero wind chills for a Week 14 duel. In windy conditions, Phil Dawson hit a pair of 29-yard field goals and Chris Jennings had a 10-yard touchdown run to put the Browns up 13. Jeff Reed nailed a field goal before the half to draw the Steelers within 10 and hit another in the third to bring them within a touchdown. However, a scoreless fourth by both teams led the Browns to their first win against the Steelers since 2003, and the Browns became only the fourth team in NFL history to be at least 10 games under .500 and defeat the defending Super Bowl champions.

With the win, the Browns improved to 2–11, snapped a twelve-game losing streak against the Steelers and won against them for the first time since 2003 when they defeated the team 33–13 in Pittsburgh finishing 1-5 against the AFC North. The team also won their first home game since an October 2008 victory, against the Super Bowl champion New York Giants. KR Josh Cribbs was named AFC Special Teams Player of the Week.

==== Week 15: at Kansas City Chiefs ====
Week 15: Cleveland Browns at Kansas City Chiefs – Game summary

Quarter	1	2	3	4	Total
**Browns**	10	10	7	14	**41**
Chiefs	3	21	0	10	**34**

at Arrowhead Stadium, Kansas City, Missouri

- Game time: 1:00 pm EST/12:00 pm CST
- Game weather: 39 °F (4 °C) (Partly Sunny)
- Game attendance: 53,315
- Referee: Gene Steratore
- TV announcers (CBS): Ian Eagle and Rich Gannon

Game information

**First quarter**

- CLE – Phil Dawson 47-yard field goal, 10:18. Browns 3–0. **Drive: 12 plays, 46 yards, 4:47.**
- KC – Ryan Succop 30-yard field goal, 4:15. Tied 3–3. **Drive: 6 plays, 37 yards, 1:58.**
- CLE – Josh Cribbs 100-yard kickoff return, 3:56. Browns 10–3.

**Second quarter**

- CLE – Phil Dawson 30-yard field goal, 12:36. Browns 13–3. **Drive: 9 plays, 40 yards, 4:32.**
- KC – Chris Chambers 9-yard pass from Matt Cassel (Ryan Succop kick), 10:04. Browns 13–10. **Drive: 6 plays, 72 yards, 2:28.**
- KC – Jamaal Charles 47-yard run (Ryan Succop kick), 4:10. Chiefs 17–13. **Drive: 5 plays, 85 yards, 2:36.**
- KC – Andy Studebaker fumble recovery in end zone, 2:44. Chiefs 24–13.
- CLE – Josh Cribbs 100-yard kickoff return (Phil Dawson kick), 2:31. Chiefs 24–20.

**Third quarter**

- CLE – Jerome Harrison 71-yard run (Phil Dawson kick), 13:16. Browns 27–24. **Drive: 2 plays, 82 yards, 0:43.**

**Fourth quarter**

- CLE – Jerome Harrison 8-yard run (Phil Dawson kick), 12:09. Browns 34–24. **Drive: 14 plays, 79 yards, 8:09.**
- KC – Ryan Succop 27-yard field goal, 8:12. Browns 34–27. **Drive: 11 plays, 64 yards, 4:01.**
- KC – Mark Bradley 12-yard pass from Matt Cassel (Ryan Succop kick), 2:20. Tied 34–34. **Drive: 8 plays, 58 yards, 2:06.**
- CLE – Jerome Harrison 28-yard run (Phil Dawson kick), 0:44. Browns 41–34. **Drive: 6 plays, 71 yards, 1:36.**

**Top passers**

- CLE – Brady Quinn – 10/17, 66 yards, 2 INT
- KC – Matt Cassel – 22/40, 331 yards, 2 TD

**Top rushers**

- CLE – Jerome Harrison – 34 rushes, 286 yards, 3 TD
- KC – Jamaal Charles – 25 rushes, 154 yards, TD

**Top receivers**

- CLE – Chansi Stuckey – 5 receptions, 41 yards
- KC – Chris Chambers – 5 receptions, 114 yards, TD

The Browns headed into Kansas City for their last road game of the year to take on the Chiefs in Week 15. The Browns and Chiefs traded field goals in the first quarter and then Josh Cribbs returned the ensuing kickoff 100 yards for a touchdown, setting an NFL record with his 7th kickoff return for a touchdown. After another Phil Dawson field goal in the second, the Chiefs scored three straight touchdowns to take a 24–13 lead. However, Cribbs again ran a kickoff back for a touchdown, this time for 103 yards and extending his NFL record to eight kickoff return touchdowns. In the second half, Jerome Harrison rushed for three touchdowns and amassed a majority of his 286 rushing yards. This set a Browns' rushing record for a single game, was the record for most rushing yards in the NFL this season, and was the third most rushing yards in a game in NFL history. Matt Cassel's final desperation pass ricocheted off the cross bar, and the Browns defeated the Chiefs 41–34, with their highest point total of the season.

With the win, the Browns improved to 3–11 and finished the season 2–6 on the road. Cribbs was named the AFC special teams player of the week for the second straight week.

==== Holmgren hired as president ====
On December 21, Mike Holmgren was hired by the Browns to take over as their president. His duties included personnel management, and he also had the power to replace Eric Mangini as head coach.

==== Week 16: vs. Oakland Raiders ====
Week 16: Oakland Raiders at Cleveland Browns – Game summary

Quarter	1	2	3	4	Total
Raiders	3	6	0	0	**9**
**Browns**	10	7	3	3	**23**

at Cleveland Browns Stadium, Cleveland, Ohio

- Game time: 1:00 pm EST
- Game weather: 34 °F (1 °C) (Cloudy)
- Game attendance: 67,964
- Referee: Jeff Triplette
- TV announcers (CBS): Don Criqui and Randy Cross

Game information
**First quarter**
- 13:38 CLE – Harrison 17-yard run (Dawson kick) 7–0 CLE
- 8:22 CLE – Dawson 42-yard field goal 10–0 CLE
- 2:53 OAK – Janikowski 44-yard field goal 10–3 CLE

**Second quarter**

- 11:16 OAK – Janikowski 34-yard field goal 10–6 CLE
- 0:21 CLE – Massaquoi 19-yard pass from Anderson (Dawson kick) 17–6 CLE
- 0:00 OAK – Janikowski 61-yard field goal 17–9 CLE

**Third quarter**

- 11:11 CLE – Dawson 33-yard field goal 20–9 CLE

**Fourth quarter**

- 8:35 CLE – Dawson 34-yard field goal 23–9 CLE

The Browns stayed home in Week 16 for a match with the Oakland Raiders, trying to extend their two-game winning streak. The Browns struck first with a 17-yard run by Jerome Harrison and a 42-yard field goal from Phil Dawson. Oakland kicker Sebastian Janikowski hit three field goals in the first half, including a 61 yarder to close out the half. However, the Browns led at halftime, 17–9. The Browns held the Raiders scoreless in the second half and Dawson hit two more field goals to lead the Browns to a 23–9 victory, their third in a row.

With the win, the Browns improved to 4–11 and finished 2-2 against the AFC West.

==== Week 17: vs. Jacksonville Jaguars ====
Week 17: Jacksonville Jaguars at Cleveland Browns – Game summary

Quarter	1	2	3	4	Total
Jaguars	3	0	0	14	**17**
**Browns**	3	10	7	3	**23**

at Cleveland Browns Stadium, Cleveland, Ohio

- Game time: 1:00 pm EST
- Game weather: 16 °F (−9 °C) (Snow Showers, −1 °F (−18 °C) Wind Chill)
- Game attendance: 66,935
- Referee: Pete Morelli
- TV announcers (CBS): Gus Johnson and Steve Tasker

Game information
**First quarter**
- 11:00 CLE – Dawson 27-yard field goal 3–0 CLE
- 2:23 JAC – Scobee 47-yard field goal 3–3

**Second quarter**

- 3:58 CLE – Cribbs 14-yard run (Dawson kick) 10–3 CLE
- 1:46 CLE – Dawson 21-yard field goal 13–3 CLE

**Third quarter**

- 4:08 CLE – Harrison 6-yard run (Dawson kick) 20–3 CLE

**Fourth quarter**

- 10:35 JAC – Miller 6-yard pass from Garrard (Scobee kick) 20–10 CLE
- 2:20 CLE – Dawson 33-yard field goal 23–10 CLE
- 0:00 JAC – Miller 15-yard pass from Garrard (Scobee kick) 23–17 CLE

The Browns closed out their season at home with a contest against the Jacksonville Jaguars, who came into the game with an outside chance of making the playoffs. Cleveland and Jacksonville traded field goals in the first quarter, but Josh Cribbs broke the tie in the second with a 14-yard touchdown run and Phil Dawson added another field goal to give the Browns a 10-point lead at the half. In the third, Jerome Harrison added a 6-yard touchdown run to push the lead to 17. In the fourth, Zach Miller caught a 6-yard pass from David Garrard to close within 10, but Dawson added another field goal. On the final play of the game (and the season), Miller caught another touchdown pass from Garrard but it was not enough and the Browns won 23–17. The Browns' 4-game winning streak was the longest since 1994.

With the win, the Browns improved to finish the season at 5–11, a one-win improvement over the 2008 campaign. They finished 3–5 at home.

==== KR Cribbs honored ====
On January 6, WR/KR Josh Cribbs was named AFC special teams player of the month for December. During the month, Cribbs earned AFC special teams player of the week honors twice and set an NFL record with eight career kickoff returns for touchdowns.

== 2010 Pro Bowl ==
KR Josh Cribbs and T Joe Thomas were recognized for individual accomplishments as they were named to the AFC roster for the 2010 Pro Bowl. Cribbs, who made his second appearance, was the starting kick and punt returner. Thomas, who made his third consecutive appearance in the game, was selected as the reserve offensive tackle, but started in the game because of an injury to Jake Long of the Miami Dolphins.
