= Jerry Lawson =

Jerry Lawson may refer to:

- Jerry Lawson (engineer) (1940–2011), American electronic engineer and videogame pioneer
- Jerry Lawson (musician) (1944–2019), American singer, producer, musical arranger, and performer
- Jerry Lawson (runner) (born 1966), former American long-distance runner

== See also ==
- Gerard Lawson (born 1985), former American football cornerback/kickoff returner
