= Coye Francies =

American football player (born 1986)

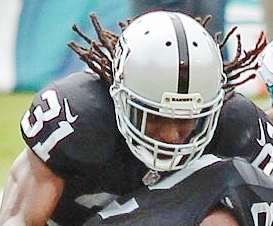
- Francies with the Oakland Raiders in 2012

No. 25, 36, 22, 31
- Position: Cornerback

Personal information
- Born: November 15, 1986 (age 39); Bakersfield, California, U.S.
- Listed height: 6 ft 0 in (1.83 m)
- Listed weight: 185 lb (84 kg)

Career information
- High school: Cordova (Rancho Cordova, California)
- College: San Jose State
- NFL draft: 2009: 6th round, 191st overall pick

Career history
- Cleveland Browns (2009); Las Vegas Locomotives (2010); Cleveland Browns (2010); Seattle Seahawks (2011–2012)*; Oakland Raiders (2012)
- * Offseason or practice squad member only

Awards and highlights
- UFL champion (2010); Second-team All-WAC (2008); Sun Bowl (2006); Community College All-American (2005)

Career NFL statistics
- Total tackles: 10
- Pass deflections: 1
- Stats at Pro Football Reference

Coye Glenn Francies (born November 15, 1986) is an American former professional football player who was a cornerback in the National Football League (NFL). He played college football for the Oregon State Beavers and San Jose State Spartans. In the 2009 NFL draft, the Cleveland Browns selected Francies in the sixth round.

== Early life ==
At Cordova High School in Rancho Cordova, California, Francies lettered in football and track and field.

Francies attended American River College from 2004–05. As a sophomore, he led the team in pass interceptions (11) and was named Mid-Empire Conference Defensive MVP. He also earned 2005 California Community College All-American honors and was listed as the No. 62 junior college player in the nation by Rivals.com.

College recruiting
| Name | Hometown | School | Height | Weight | Commit date |
|---|---|---|---|---|---|
| Coye Francies; CB | Rancho Cordova, CA | American River CC | 6 ft 2 in (1.88 m) | 195 lb (88 kg) | Dec 16, 2005 |
| Coye Francies; CB | Recruit ratings: Scout: Rivals: 247Sports: | | | | |
Overall recruit ranking: Scout: 7 (CB) 247Sports: 164 (JUCO), 12 (CB), 80 (CA)
Note: In many cases, Scout, Rivals, 247Sports, On3, and ESPN may conflict in their listings of height and weight.; In these cases, the average was taken. ESPN grades are on a 100-point scale.; Sources: "2006 Oregon St. Football Commitment List". Rivals.; "2006 Oregon State College Football Team Recruiting Prospects". Scout.; "Scout.com Team Recruiting Rankings". Scout.; "2006 Team Ranking". Rivals.com.; "Oregon State 2006 Football Commits". 247Sports.

Francies transferred to Oregon State University to continue his collegiate career. He played in all 14 games and started five times for the Beavers in the 2006 season. Oregon State won the 2006 Sun Bowl. However, Francies was thrown off the team in the summer of 2007 after a gun registered to him was found during a traffic stop.

He then transferred to San Jose State University, where he redshirted the 2007 season. Returning to the field in 2008, Francies 69 tackles (45 solo), three interceptions and two forced fumbles. He also returned six kicks for 148 yards and ten punts for 29 yards. Francies was named 2nd Team All-WAC in 2008.

== Professional career ==
=== Pre-draft ===
Francies entered the combine a projected second- or third-round pick according to NFL scouts, but after slow 40-yard dash times he was projected to slide to the fourth or fifth round.

Pre-draft measurables
| Height | Weight | Arm length | Hand span | 40-yard dash | 10-yard split | 20-yard split | 20-yard shuttle | Three-cone drill | Vertical jump | Broad jump | Bench press |
|---|---|---|---|---|---|---|---|---|---|---|---|
| 6 ft 0 3/8 in (1.84 m) | 185 lb (84 kg) | 32 in (0.81 m) | 8 3/4 in (0.22 m) | 4.65 s | 1.61 s | 2.68 s | 4.24 s | 6.81 s | 36 in (0.91 m) | 10 ft 3 in (3.12 m) | 24 reps |
Arm and hand spans from Pro Day, all other values from NFL Combine.

=== Cleveland Browns (first stint) ===
Francies was one of the Cleveland Browns' three sixth-round picks in the NFL Draft.

Francies was involved in a locker room altercation on September 25, 2009 in which he was the victim of a prank. Francies was seen storming into the locker room with a bucket of ice and hurled it at cornerback Brandon McDonald. Punches were reportedly thrown before All-Pro DT Shaun Rogers escorted him out of the room. In six games with the Browns, Francies had four tackles and one pass deflected. The Browns waived Francies on September 4, 2010.

=== Las Vegas Locomotives ===
For the 2010 UFL season, Francies signed with the Las Vegas Locomotives. In eight games, Francies made 11.5 tackles and two interceptions, and Las Vegas won the 2010 UFL championship.

=== Cleveland Browns (second stint) ===
Francies returned to the Browns after his season in the UFL, first signing to the Brown practice squad on December 1, 2010 and to the active roster on December 14. Francies played two games that season and had three tackles. The Browns waived Francies on September 3, 2011.

=== Seattle Seahawks ===
On December 14, 2011, Francies signed with the Seattle Seahawks to the practice squad. Francies re-signed with the team as a reserve and future free agent. Francies played three preseason games with Seattle in 2012, and he was waived by the Seahawks on August 27.

=== Oakland Raiders ===
Two days after the Seahawks waived him, Francies signed with the Oakland Raiders on August 29 and played the final preseason game for the Raiders against the Seahawks. Francies fumbled a kickoff return in that game but still made the final 53-man roster, but the Raiders waived Francies on September 6 to make room for wide receiver Derek Hagan. On September 12, the Raiders signed Francies to the practice squad, and the team promoted Francies to the active roster on September 15. Francies played his first game with the Raiders in Week 2 on September 16 against the Miami Dolphins. Francies made three tackles in 15 games in 2012. In the last game of the season against the San Diego Chargers, Francies blocked a punt by Mike Scifres late in the game.

On July 23, 2013, Francies was waived by the Oakland Raiders.
