= Brett Ratliff =

American football player (born 1985)

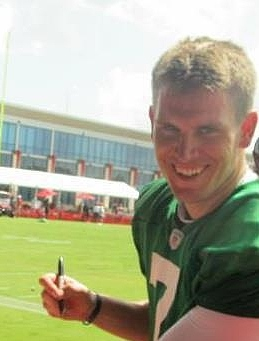
- Ratliff signs an autograph at Tampa Bay Buccaneers training camp in 2011

No. 5, 7
- Position: Quarterback

Personal information
- Born: August 8, 1985 (age 41); Chico, California, U.S.
- Listed height: 6 ft 4 in (1.93 m)
- Listed weight: 235 lb (107 kg)

Career information
- College: Utah
- NFL draft: 2007: undrafted

Career history
- New York Jets (2007–2008); Cleveland Browns (2009); Jacksonville Jaguars (2010)*; New England Patriots (2010)*; Cleveland Browns (2010); Tennessee Titans (2011)*; Tampa Bay Buccaneers (2011–2012)*
- * Offseason or practice squad member only

Awards and highlights
- Tri-Counties Bank Holiday Bowl (2003); All-NorCal Conference (2004)
- Stats at Pro Football Reference

Brett Ratliff (born August 8, 1985) is an American former professional football quarterback. He was signed by the New York Jets as an undrafted free agent in 2007. He played college football at Butte College and Utah. He was also a member of the Cleveland Browns, Jacksonville Jaguars, New England Patriots, Tennessee Titans, and Tampa Bay Buccaneers.

== Early life ==
Ratliff was born in Chico, California, and attended Chico Senior High School in Chico, California, where he played football as a quarterback. He led his teams to two conference championships, (JV and freshman year) and as a senior, he was named the Chico High School Offensive Player of the Year, and was an All-Conference selection and played in the Lions Club District 4C-1 Senior All-Star Football Game in 2003.

== College career ==
=== Butte College ===
After attending high school, Ratliff went on to Butte College (2003–04) in Oroville, California, where he was the starting quarterback for two seasons, following Aaron Rodgers. While at Butte College, he set the school's career record for touchdowns (35), completions (239), and total offensive yards (3,651).

=== Utah ===
After graduating from Butte, Ratliff went to Utah for the 2005 season. He spent most of the year as a backup to Brian Johnson, but he got his chance to start after Johnson suffered a season-ending injury. In his first start, Ratliff led the Utes to a 41–34 victory over rival BYU to get the Utes to bowl eligibility. In his second start, he led the Utes to a 38–10 upset victory over #25 Georgia Tech in the Emerald Bowl.

In 2006, Ratliff led the Utes to an 8–5 season record, including a 25–13 victory over Tulsa in the Armed Forces Bowl.

== Professional career ==
Ratliff was rated the 25th best quarterback in the 2007 NFL draft by NFLDraftScout.com.

=== New York Jets ===
Ratliff signed with the New York Jets as an undrafted free agent following the 2007 NFL draft. After being waived on September 1, 2007, he was signed to the practice squad two days later, where he spent the entire season. In 2008, Ratliff made the Jets active roster and was the third-string quarterback for the entire season.

=== Cleveland Browns ===
Ratliff was traded to the Cleveland Browns on April 25, 2009 as part of a deal for the Browns' first-round pick, which the Jets used to draft Mark Sanchez in the 2009 NFL draft. The Browns also received two other players and the Jets' 17th overall pick, as well as a second round pick. Ratliff, who played under head coach Eric Mangini for a second straight season, was also the third-string quarterback for a second consecutive season in 2009. He was waived by the Browns on September 4, 2010.

=== Jacksonville Jaguars ===
On September 5, 2010, Ratliff was signed to the Jacksonville Jaguars practice squad. He was released from the practice squad on September 27, 2010.

=== New England Patriots ===
On October 7, 2010, Ratliff was signed to the New England Patriots practice squad.

=== Second stint with Browns ===
On October 11, 2010, Ratliff was signed off the Patriots practice squad by the Browns to their active roster. Ratliff was waived by the team on November 16, 2010.

=== Tampa Bay Buccaneers ===
After spending training camp with the Tennessee Titans and being out of football for a few months in 2011, Ratliff was signed by the Buccaneers on December 6, 2011. He was released on September 1, 2012.
