= Kaluka Maiava =

American football player (born 1987)

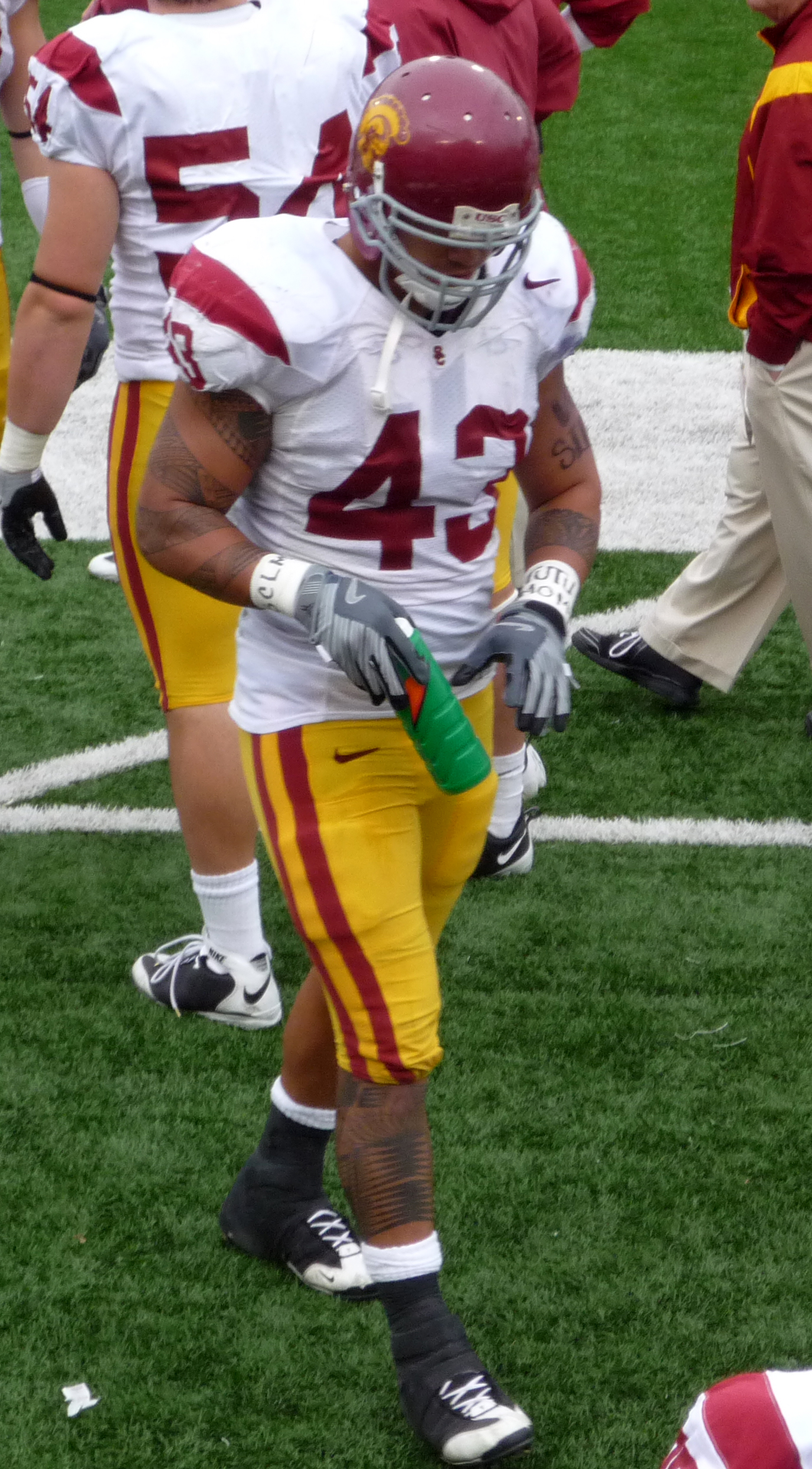
- Maiava with the USC Trojans in 2008

No. 56, 50
- Position: Linebacker

Personal information
- Born: March 22, 1987 (age 39); Honolulu, Hawaii, U.S.
- Listed height: 5 ft 11 in (1.80 m)
- Listed weight: 226 lb (103 kg)

Career information
- High school: Baldwin (Wailuku, Hawaii)
- College: USC
- NFL draft: 2009: 4th round, 104th overall pick

Career history
- Cleveland Browns (2009–2012); Oakland Raiders (2013–2014)

Awards and highlights
- Second-team All-Pac-10 (2008)

Career NFL statistics
- Total tackles: 164
- Sacks: 4.5
- Forced fumbles: 5
- Stats at Pro Football Reference

Kaiula Kawahalama Maiava (born March 22, 1987) is an American former professional football player who was a linebacker for the Cleveland Browns and Oakland Raiders of the National Football League (NFL). He played college football for the USC Trojans and was selected by the Cleveland Browns in the fourth round of the 2009 NFL draft.

== Early life ==
Maiava attended Henry Perrine Baldwin High School in Wailuku, Hawaii on the island of Maui. His junior year, he had 157 tackles, 22 tackles for loss and 8 sacks. Before his senior season, Maiava nearly transferred to Kahuku High School on the island of Oahu, where his uncle was an assistant coach, to get more attention at a program known for its NFL alumni; however, his strong performance in football camps on the mainland influenced him to remain at Baldwin. His senior year, he had 147 tackles, 39 tackles for loss, 8 sacks, 8 forced fumbles and 5 blocked kicks, as well as a punt return for a TD. As a student, he achieved a 3.6 grade point average and an SAT score of 1010 (old scoring system). He modeled himself after Chicago Bears linebacker Brian Urlacher.

Considered the top recruit coming out of Hawaii and one of the top prospects at the linebacker position, Maiava was heavily recruited. A number of major programs offered him scholarships, including UCLA, Washington, Oregon, Utah, BYU, Wisconsin, Colorado, Arizona and UTEP; however, he was not strongly recruited by the University of Hawaii, then under June Jones. His final three choices were USC, UCLA and Colorado. In the summer before his senior year, while attending camps on the mainland, he was invited to make an official visit to UCLA. Impressed by their facilities and coaching staff, he made a soft verbal commitment to UCLA in July 2004. However, Maiava decided to visit other programs and eventually drawn to USC, where he was attracted to the energy of the players and coaches, the program's popularity and the Hollywood atmosphere. He committed to USC on October 11, 2004; he joined the same class as fellow Trojans linebacker Brian Cushing. He is the first player from Maui to play for USC.

In February 2005, the Council of the County of Maui honored him with a resolution congratulating him for all of his high school football achievements.

== College career ==
Maiava attended USC and played for the USC Trojan football team (2005-2008 seasons) under head coach Pete Carroll and Linebacker Coach Ken Norton Jr. The 2008 linebacker corps at USC, featuring Brian Cushing, Maiava, Clay Matthews III, and Rey Maualuga, was ranked as one of the most talented linebacker corps in college football history.

During his freshman season at USC, Maiava was selected by the team as co-special teams player of the year along with kicker Mario Danelo, he also won the Trojans' Service Team Defensive Player of the Year. In 2006, he had 34 tackles, including 3½ for losses while playing in 12 games and again winning the team's Co-Special Teams Player of the Year Award. During his junior, 2007 season, he was a key reserve, making 44 tackles, including 4½ for losses, two sacks, two pass deflections and a forced fumble while appearing in all 13 games and starting once, against Arizona State. During that season's bowl game, the 2008 Rose Bowl, he suffered a wrist injury and was unable to participate in spring practices.

Going into his senior, 2008 season, he replaced All-American, top-10 NFL draft selection Keith Rivers in a linebacking corp that included highly touted NFL prospects Brian Cushing and Rey Maualuga. He had a strong senior season, finishing the regular season with 62 tackles, 7½ for losses, three pass deflections and an interception while making all 12 starts. He won the team player of the game award against rival-Notre Dame, and had the highest number tackles in games were USC struggled against opposing teams' rushing attack. In the 2009 Rose Bowl Game, Maiava became the third straight linebacker from USC to have won the most valuable defensive player of the game, following 2009 bowl game teammates Cushing (2007) and Maualuga (2008).

Maiava was one of twelve USC players, including the four senior linebackers Brian Cushing, Maiava, Clay Matthews III, and Rey Maualuga, who attended the by-invitation-only 2009 NFL Scouting Combine (top rated NCAA Division 1 teams might send only one to three senior players to the Combine).

=== Awards and honors ===
- 2009 Rose Bowl Defensive MVP
- 2008 coaches Second-team All-Pac-10
- 2005-2006 USC Special Teams player of the Year

== Professional career ==
=== Pre-draft measurables ===
Pre-draft measurables
Height	Weight	Arm length	Hand span	40-yard dash	10-yard split	20-yard split	20-yard shuttle	Three-cone drill	Vertical jump	Broad jump	Bench press
5 ft 11 1/2 in (1.82 m)	229 lb (104 kg)	30 1/2 in (0.77 m)	9 1/2 in (0.24 m)	4.65 s	1.62 s	2.70 s	4.20 s	6.98 s	32 in (0.81 m)	9 ft 2 in (2.79 m)	30 reps
All values from NFL Combine/USC's Pro Day

=== Cleveland Browns ===
Maiava was selected by the Cleveland Browns in the fourth round, 104th overall in the 2009 NFL draft.

=== Oakland Raiders ===
On March 13, 2013, Maiava signed a three-year, $6 million contract with the Oakland Raiders.

On July 10, 2013, Maiava was charged with assault and criminal property damage.

Maiava was released by the Raiders on November 17, 2014.

== NFL career statistics ==
Legend
**Bold**	Career high

Year	Team	Games		Tackles					Interceptions					Fumbles			
Year	Team	GP	GS	Cmb	Solo	Ast	Sck	TFL	Int	Yds	TD	Lng	PD	FF	FR	Yds	TD
2009	CLE	**16**	3	45	34	11	**2.5**	1	0	0	0	0	2	**2**	0	0	0
2010	CLE	2	0	1	1	0	0.0	0	0	0	0	0	0	0	0	0	0
2011	CLE	**16**	6	34	29	5	0.0	**3**	0	0	0	0	0	1	0	0	0
2012	CLE	**16**	**13**	**53**	**35**	**18**	2.0	1	0	0	0	0	**3**	**2**	0	0	0
2013	OAK	9	1	17	10	7	0.0	0	0	0	0	0	0	0	0	0	0
2014	OAK	4	2	14	8	6	0.0	1	0	0	0	0	0	0	0	0	0
Career		63	25	164	117	47	4.5	6	0	0	0	0	5	5	0	0	0

== Coaching career ==
Maiava is currently a head coach of the Hawaii Preparatory Academy football team.

== Personal life ==
Maiava's father, Scott Mahoney, attended and played football for Kamehameha Schools and the University of Colorado as an offensive lineman. His mother, Kathryn, works for an airline, which allowed the family the ability to take free trips to the mainland during Maiava's high school recruiting period. His brother, Kai, also played football at Colorado and UCLA. He is the grandson of professional wrestler Neff Maiava, and the nephew of Dwayne Johnson, who played football at Miami before gaining fame as professional wrestler "The Rock".
