= Charles Ali =

American football player (born 1984)

No. 41, 42, 45, 28
- Position: Fullback

Personal information
- Born: August 23, 1984 (age 42); St. Louis, Missouri, U.S.
- Listed height: 6 ft 2 in (1.88 m)
- Listed weight: 255 lb (116 kg)

Career information
- High school: Cleveland Junior Naval Academy (St. Louis)
- College: Arkansas-Pine Bluff
- NFL draft: 2007: undrafted

Career history
- Cleveland Browns (2007–2008); New York Sentinels (2009); Baltimore Ravens (2009–2010); Arizona Cardinals (2010–2011)*; Sacramento Mountain Lions (2011)
- * Offseason or practice squad member only
- Stats at Pro Football Reference

Charles Ali (born August 23, 1984) is an American former professional football player who was a fullback for the Cleveland Browns of the National Football League (NFL). He played college football for the Arkansas-Pine Bluff Golden Lions and was signed by the Browns as an undrafted free agent in 2007.

Aliwas also a member of the New York Sentinels, Baltimore Ravens, Arizona Cardinals, and Sacramento Mountain Lions.

== College career ==
Ali attended the University of Arkansas at Pine Bluff, where he started at linebacker/defensive end but made the switch to fullback. He was a business management major.

== Professional career ==
=== Cleveland Browns ===
After the Browns' last preseason game in 2007, Ali survived the final roster cut becoming backup to fullback Lawrence Vickers. Ali was the only undrafted free agent to make the team out of camp. He made his NFL debut versus the Cincinnati Bengals on September 16. He was cut by the Browns during the final roster cut-down on September 5, 2009.

=== New York Sentinels ===
Ali joined the New York Sentinels of the United Football League for the 2009 season.

=== Baltimore Ravens ===
Ali signed with the Baltimore Ravens on November 25, 2009. He was waived on December 12.

Following the season, the Ravens re-signed Ali to a future contract on January 22, 2010. Ali was waived on April 28, 2010.

=== Arizona Cardinals ===
Ali signed with the Arizona Cardinals on May 7, 2010. He was waived on August 29, 2011,
