= Ahtyba Rubin =

American football player (born 1986)

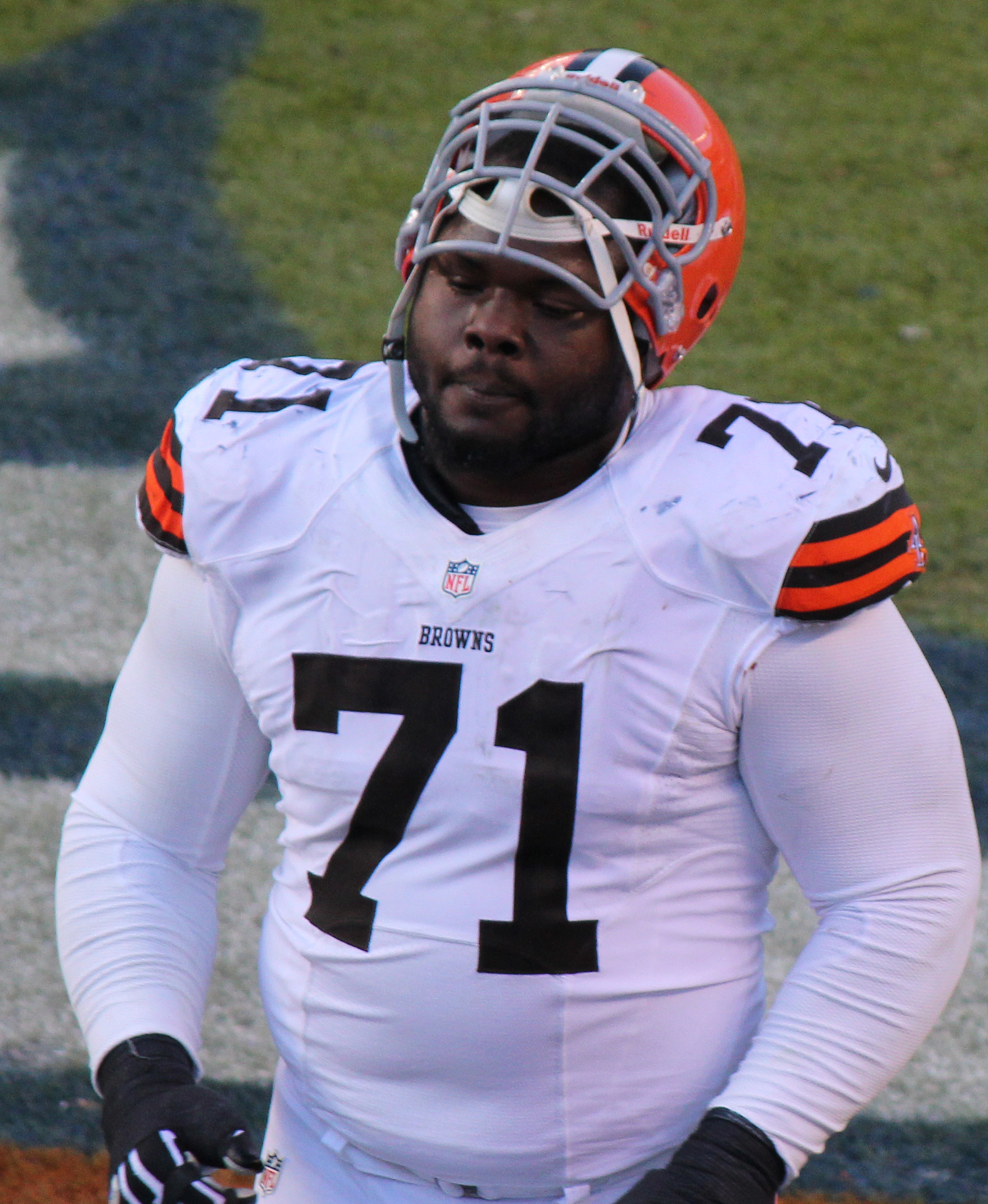
- Rubin with the Cleveland Browns in 2012

No. 71, 77, 79, 78
- Position: Defensive tackle

Personal information
- Born: July 25, 1986 (age 40); Fort Belvoir, Virginia, U.S.
- Listed height: 6 ft 3 in (1.91 m)
- Listed weight: 330 lb (150 kg)

Career information
- High school: Escambia (Pensacola, Florida)
- College: Trinity Valley CC (2004–2005); Iowa State (2006–2007)
- NFL draft: 2008: 6th round, 190th overall pick

Career history
- Cleveland Browns (2008–2014); Seattle Seahawks (2015–2016); Denver Broncos (2017); Atlanta Falcons (2017); Oakland Raiders (2018)

Career NFL statistics
- Total tackles: 428
- Sacks: 15
- Forced fumbles: 6
- Fumble recoveries: 1
- Interceptions: 2
- Stats at Pro Football Reference

Ahtyba Rubin (/ɑːˈtɑːbə/ ah-TAH-bə; born July 25, 1986) is an American former professional football player who was a defensive tackle in the National Football League (NFL). He played college football for the Iowa State Cyclones and was selected by the Cleveland Browns in the sixth round of the 2008 NFL draft.

== Early life ==
Born in Fort Belvoir, Virginia, Rubin graduated from Escambia High School in Pensacola, Florida in 2004, the same high school as former Cleveland Browns teammate Trent Richardson, and NFL Hall of Famer Emmitt Smith. He then went on to attend Trinity Valley Community College in Athens, Texas. In his freshman year, he played defensive line, but was converted into an offense lineman for his sophomore year. Rubin made the adjustment with significant success and earned all-conference and honorable mention All-America honors in 2006.

== College career ==
Regarded as a three-star recruit out of junior college, Rubin was recruited by a number of schools, and eventually picked Iowa State University over Texas Christian University. He was switched back to defensive line in his junior year, and started the last nine games of the 2006 season. He finished the year with 34 tackles, four tackles for loss, and a sack.

As a senior, Rubin played in all of the Cyclones' games, registering 42 tackles (with four for loss) and recording 1.5 sacks.

== Professional career ==
=== 2008 NFL draft ===
Following his impressive senior season at Iowa State, Rubin was regarded as a "productive NFL starter" at nose tackle, and projected a mid-third round pick by Sports Illustrated.

Pre-draft measurables
Height	Weight	40-yard dash	10-yard split	20-yard split	20-yard shuttle	Three-cone drill	Vertical jump	Broad jump	Bench press
6 ft 2 3/4 in (1.90 m)	315 lb (143 kg)	5.20 s	1.74 s	2.96 s	5.00 s	8.05 s	28 in (0.71 m)	8 ft 10 in (2.69 m)	35 reps
All values from NFL Combine

=== Cleveland Browns ===
Rubin was selected in the sixth round (190th overall) by the Cleveland Browns, and was signed on July 22, 2008.

He filled out a backup role for Browns nose tackle Shaun Rogers in 2008 and 2009, until Rogers went down with a lower leg injury in week 12 against the Cincinnati Bengals. Rubin has since become the Browns starting nose tackle. In the 2010 offseason the Browns traded defensive end Corey Williams to the Detroit Lions, moved former starting nose Tackle Shaun Rogers to defensive end and promoted Rubin to starter due to his performance in 2009. 2010 was the best season of Rubin's young career, highlighted by his 87 tackles and an interception against Kansas City's Matt Cassel. In his five years with the Browns, Rubin has played in 72 games, starting 50 of them. His career totals are 9.0 sacks, 227 total tackles, 4 passes defended, 1 interception, 3 forced fumbles, and 1 fumble recovery.

=== Seattle Seahawks ===
On March 19, 2015, Rubin signed a one-year deal with the Seattle Seahawks. The Seahawks released incumbent starting defensive tackle Tony McDaniel during training camp, giving Rubin a great opportunity at a starting job. In Week 4 against the Cincinnati Bengals, Rubin got his first sack as a Seahawk. In Week 11 vs the Pittsburgh Steelers, Rubin got an interception in a 39–30 victory.

On March 7, 2016, he signed a three-year contract.

On September 2, 2017, Rubin was released by the Seahawks.

=== Denver Broncos ===
On September 15, 2017, Rubin signed with the Denver Broncos. He was released on October 17, 2017.

=== Atlanta Falcons ===
On October 19, 2017, Rubin signed with the Atlanta Falcons.

=== Oakland Raiders ===
On June 12, 2018, Rubin signed with the Oakland Raiders. He was placed on injured reserve on August 15, 2018, after suffering a tear in his biceps.

== NFL career statistics ==
Legend
**Bold**	Career high

=== Regular season ===
Year	Team	Games		Tackles					Interceptions					Fumbles			
Year	Team	GP	GS	Cmb	Solo	Ast	Sck	TFL	Int	Yds	TD	Lng	PD	FF	FR	Yds	TD
2008	CLE	12	0	11	7	4	0.0	1	0	0	0	0	0	0	**1**	0	0
2009	CLE	**16**	5	38	23	15	0.0	0	0	0	0	0	0	1	0	0	0
2010	CLE	**16**	**16**	82	**57**	25	2.0	2	**1**	1	0	1	**2**	0	0	0	0
2011	CLE	**16**	**16**	**83**	56	**27**	**5.0**	4	0	0	0	0	0	0	0	0	0
2012	CLE	13	13	44	30	14	2.0	4	0	0	0	0	**2**	2	0	0	0
2013	CLE	14	14	52	25	**27**	2.0	3	0	0	0	0	0	0	0	0	0
2014	CLE	13	11	28	14	14	1.0	1	0	0	0	0	1	0	0	0	0
2015	SEA	**16**	**16**	36	20	16	2.0	2	**1**	**2**	0	**2**	1	0	0	0	0
2016	SEA	**16**	**16**	39	25	14	1.0	**6**	0	0	0	0	1	**3**	0	0	0
2017	DEN	2	0	0	0	0	0.0	0	0	0	0	0	0	0	0	0	0
2017	ATL	10	0	15	7	8	0.0	0	0	0	0	0	0	0	0	0	0
Career		144	107	428	264	164	15.0	23	2	3	0	2	7	6	1	0	0

=== Playoffs ===
Year	Team	Games		Tackles					Interceptions					Fumbles			
Year	Team	GP	GS	Cmb	Solo	Ast	Sck	TFL	Int	Yds	TD	Lng	PD	FF	FR	Yds	TD
2015	SEA	**2**	**2**	**10**	**5**	**5**	**1.0**	**2**	0	0	0	0	0	0	**1**	0	0
2016	SEA	**2**	**2**	4	2	2	**1.0**	1	0	0	0	0	0	0	0	0	0
2017	ATL	1	0	2	2	0	0.0	0	0	0	0	0	0	0	0	0	0
Career		5	4	16	9	7	2.0	3	0	0	0	0	0	0	1	0	0
