= George Kokinis =

American football executive (born 1967)

Baltimore Ravens
- Title: Vice president of player personnel

Personal information
- Born: February 27, 1967 (age 59); Wethersfield, Connecticut, U.S.

Career information
- College: Hobart College; University of Richmond

Career history
- Cleveland Browns (1991–1995) Scout; Baltimore Ravens (1996–1999) Area scout; Baltimore Ravens (2000–2002) Assistant director of pro personnel; Baltimore Ravens (2003–2008) Director of pro personnel; Cleveland Browns (2009) General manager; Baltimore Ravens (2010–2018) Senior personnel assistant; Baltimore Ravens (2019–2023) Director of player personnel; Baltimore Ravens (2024–present) Vice president of player personnel

Awards and highlights
- 2× Super Bowl champion (XXXV, XLVII)
- Executive profile at Pro Football Reference

George Kokinis (born February 27, 1967) is an American football executive who is the vice president of player personnel for the Baltimore Ravens of the National Football League (NFL). He previously served as the general manager of the Cleveland Browns in 2009. Kokinis began his NFL scouting career with the Browns in 1991 and stayed with the team upon their rebranding as the Ravens in 1996.

== Early life and education ==
A native of Wethersfield, Connecticut, Kokinis earned a degree in psychology from Hobart College and a master's degree in sports management from the University of Richmond where he served as a graduate assistant for the school's baseball team. At Hobart, Kokinis played both football and baseball.

== Executive career ==
=== Cleveland Browns ===
In 1991, Kokinis began his NFL scouting career with the Cleveland Browns, after an internship with the team's operations department.

=== Baltimore Ravens ===
In 1996, Kokinis was hired by the Baltimore Ravens as an area scout for the Northeast. In 2000, he was promoted to assistant director of pro personnel.

In 2002, Kokinis was promoted to director of pro personnel. As director of pro personnel for the Ravens, Kokinis was responsible for analyzing NFL rosters and assessing the free agent market. He also assisted in contract negotiation for some of the team's draft picks.

=== Cleveland Browns (second stint) ===
In 2009, Kokinis was hired by the Cleveland Browns as their general manager. But after a 1–7 start, Kokinis was fired by the Cleveland Browns under tense circumstances. The team later released a statement saying he was "no longer actively involved with the organization."

=== Baltimore Ravens (second stint) ===
On June 1, 2010, George Kokinis returned to the Baltimore Ravens as a senior personnel assistant under general manager Ozzie Newsome.

In 2019, Kokinis was promoted to director of player personnel alongside Joe Hortiz under general manager Eric DeCosta. He was promoted to vice president of player personnel on May 22, 2024.
