= Pat Murray (American football) =

American football player (born 1984)

No. 75
- Position: Guard

Personal information
- Born: October 31, 1984 (age 42); Fort Dodge, Iowa, U.S.
- Listed height: 6 ft 3 in (1.91 m)
- Listed weight: 310 lb (141 kg)

Career information
- College: Truman State
- NFL draft: 2007: undrafted

Career history
- Green Bay Packers (2007)*; Seattle Seahawks (2008)*; Denver Broncos (2008); Cleveland Browns (2009–2011)*
- * Offseason or practice squad member only

Awards and highlights
- First-team All-MIAA (2006); Second-team All-MIAA (2005)
- Stats at Pro Football Reference

Pat Murray (born October 31, 1984) is an American former professional football guard. He was signed by the Green Bay Packers as an undrafted free agent in 2007. He played college football at Truman State.

Murray was also a member of the Seattle Seahawks, Denver Broncos, and Cleveland Browns.

== College career ==
At Truman State, Murray earned Honorable Mention All-MIAA in 2004, 2005 Second-team All-MIAA, 2006 First-team All-MIAA. He then went on to play in the (Division I-AA, II, III, and NAIA) 2006 East Coast Bowl in Petersburg Virginia. Because of his performance at the East Coast Bowl he was asked to participate in the inaugural (Division I) 2007 Texas vs. The Nation game in El Paso, Texas.

== Professional career ==
=== Green Bay Packers ===
After going undrafted in the 2007 NFL draft, Murray signed with the Green Bay Packers on May 4, 2007. He was waived before the start of the 2007 regular season.

=== Seattle Seahawks ===
Murray was signed to the Seattle Seahawks practice squad during the 2008 season.

=== Denver Broncos ===
Murray was signed off the Seahawks practice squad by the Denver Broncos on December 9, 2008. He was waived on August 17, 2009.

=== Cleveland Browns ===
Murray was signed by the Cleveland Browns on August 20, 2009. Murray was signed to a reserved/future contract January 5, 2010. He was released on September 4, 2011.
