= Chris Jennings (gridiron football) =

American gridiron football player (born 1985)

No. 34, 32
- Position: Running back

Personal information
- Born: December 12, 1985 (age 40); Huntington, West Virginia, U.S.
- Listed height: 5 ft 10 in (1.78 m)
- Listed weight: 218 lb (99 kg)

Career information
- College: Arizona
- NFL draft: 2008: undrafted

Career history
- Montreal Alouettes (2008–2009); Cleveland Browns (2009–2010); Hartford Colonials (2010); New York Jets (2011)*; Montreal Alouettes (2012–2013); Toronto Argonauts (2013)*
- * Offseason or practice squad member only

Career NFL statistics
- Rushing attempts: 63
- Rushing yards: 220
- Rushing touchdowns: 1
- Receptions: 9
- Receiving yards: 56
- Stats at Pro Football Reference
- Stats at CFL.ca (archive)

Chris Jennings (born December 12, 1985) is a former gridiron football running back. He played college football at Arizona and high school football at Fairview High School in Ashland, Kentucky.

He was a member of the Cleveland Browns, Hartford Colonials, New York Jets, Montreal Alouettes and the Toronto Argonauts.

== Professional career ==
=== Montreal Alouettes ===
After going undrafted in the 2008 NFL draft, Jennings drew interest from the Baltimore Ravens and worked out for the Cleveland Browns however, the Browns were not in a position to sign Jennings at the time. Instead, Jennings signed with the Montreal Alouettes of the CFL on June 15, 2008. Jennings was placed on the team's practice squad.

=== Cleveland Browns ===
Jennings was signed by the Browns on August 18, 2009. In three preseason games, Jennings ran for 63 yards on 18 carries while catching 7 passes for 69 yards. He was waived by the Browns on September 5 but re-signed to their practice squad two days later. Jennings was promoted to the active roster on October 3 after the team placed James Davis on the injured reserve list.

He made his NFL debut October 4, 2009 for the Browns against the Cincinnati Bengals running for 8 yards on 1 carry. Jennings was primarily used in a reserved role however, he started his first game against Cincinnati on November 29. On December 10, Jennings became the first Browns rookie running back to score a rushing touchdown since Lee Suggs in 2003. It was also the first rushing touchdown by a Browns running back that season. Jennings finished the season having rushed for 220 yards and a touchdown while catching 9 passes for 56 yards.

Jennings was re-signed by the Browns on March 17, 2010, and figured to have a role in the Browns' offense following his positive performance in his rookie season however, he was waived on September 4 as part of the final roster cuts. The Browns decided not to re-sign Jennings, who threatened to seek out other opportunities, despite injuries that plagued running back Peyton Hillis.

=== Hartford Colonials ===
Jennings signed with the Hartford Colonials of the UFL on October 21, 2010. Jennings carried the ball only 12 times for 6 yards in his tenure with the Colonials however he was an important contributor to their special teams unit.

=== New York Jets ===
Jennings was signed to a future contract by the New York Jets on January 5, 2011. During the Jets' second game of the 2011 preseason he had four carries for 81 yards. He ran 69 yards on one run, which was the longest run from the line of scrimmage by a Jet in the preseason since Curtis Martin ran 80 yards in 1999. He was waived on September 3.

=== Montreal Alouettes (II) ===
Jennings returned to the CFL in the second half of the 2012 CFL season after being released by the New York Jets. He played in 7 of the 18 regular season games that year, compiling 318 yards on the ground and 163 through the air. He received 8 rushing attempts in the first 3 games of the 2013 CFL season before being released by the Alouettes on July 15, 2013.

=== Toronto Argonauts ===
The Toronto Argonauts of the CFL, signed Jennings on September 25, 2013. He was released by the Argonauts on October 22, 2013.

== Personal life ==
Jennings resides in Chandler, AZ .

=== Legal ===
Jennings allegedly assaulted a doorman on April 17, 2010, at a dance club. The following month, Jennings was not charged with assault as the doorman did not sign the complaint.

Jennings was arrested in Guernsey County, Ohio, on September 5, 2011, for driving 147 MPH, in a 65 MPH zone.
