= Branndon Braxton =

American gridiron football player (born 1985)

No. 76, 75, 69
- Position: Offensive tackle

Personal information
- Born: December 10, 1985 (age 40); Youngstown, Ohio, U.S.
- Listed height: 6 ft 6 in (1.98 m)
- Listed weight: 304 lb (138 kg)

Career information
- College: Oklahoma
- NFL draft: 2009: undrafted

Career history
- Cleveland Browns (2009)*; Las Vegas Locomotives (2009–2010); Cleveland Browns (2010)*; Las Vegas Locomotives (2011); Toronto Argonauts (2014)
- * Offseason or practice squad member only

Awards and highlights
- 2× UFL champion (2009, 2010)
- Stats at Pro Football Reference

Branndon Braxton (born December 10, 1985) is an American former professional football offensive tackle. He was signed by the Cleveland Browns as an undrafted free agent in 2009. He played college football at Oklahoma.

== Early life ==
Braxton attended Ursuline High School in Youngstown, Ohio. A three-year letterman and two-year starter, Braxton was named a PrepStar All-American, first-team all-state, All-Northeastern Ohio and All-Steel Valley his junior and senior seasons. He was rated 53rd in the nation by rivals.com and 6th offensive lineman by PrepStar.

Also lettered in basketball, shot put, and discus. He led his basketball conference in scoring his senior year.

== College career ==
Braxton saw backup action in 2005 as a freshman, but started seven games at right tackle before a leg injury ended his season. He then started seven games for the Sooners the next season before starting every game in 2008 as a senior. Though he didn't earn the recognition of Phil Loadholt or Duke Robinson, he played a pivotal part in leading the Sooners to the BCS National Championship game. He was an extremely dominant post player in rec basketball games. Braxton had double doubles in every game.

== Professional career ==
Pre-draft measurables
Height	Weight	40-yard dash	10-yard split	20-yard split	20-yard shuttle	Three-cone drill	Vertical jump	Broad jump	Bench press
6 ft 6 1/4 in (1.99 m)	306 lb (139 kg)	5.70 s	1.98 s	3.27 s	4.85 s	7.75 s	26.0 in (0.66 m)	7 ft 7 in (2.31 m)	15 reps
All values from Pro Day

=== Cleveland Browns ===
Braxton signed an undrafted rookie contract with the Cleveland Browns shortly after the 2009 NFL draft. He is one of four rookie Oklahoma Sooner offensive linemen who joined the NFL that season. He was waived on August 20. The Browns re-signed Braxton on September 1. He was cut on September 5.

=== UFL ===
Braxton spent the 2009 season as a reserve offensive tackle in 2009 for the United Football League's Las Vegas franchise. He moved into the starting lineup in 2010 at left tackle. Following the 2010 UFL season, Braxton was signed to the Browns' practice squad. He was later re-signed to a reserve/future's contract for training camp 2011, but was let go in the club's final preseason cuts. He returned to the UFL's Las Vegas franchise in 2011, starting at right tackle.

=== Toronto Argonauts ===
On October 7, 2014, Braxton was signed to a practice roster agreement with the Toronto Argonauts of the Canadian Football League.

Since the beginning of the 2015 CFL season, Braxton has been placed on the suspended list by the Argonauts.

== Personal ==
Braxton is the son of Eric Braxton and Tonya Harris. He majored in sociology at the University of Oklahoma. He is cousins with former NBA player Samaki Walker.
