= Marcus Benard =

American football player (born 1985)

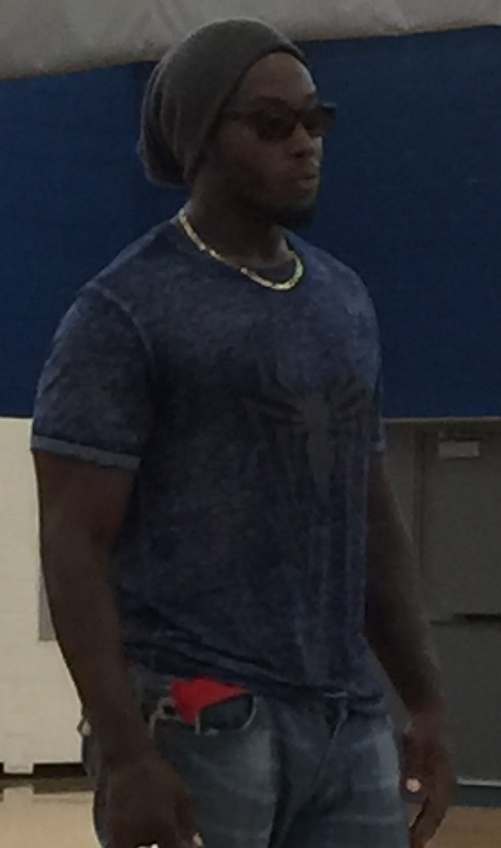

No. 58, 59, 96
- Position: Linebacker

Personal information
- Born: July 26, 1985 (age 41); Adrian, Michigan, U.S.
- Listed height: 6 ft 4 in (1.93 m)
- Listed weight: 256 lb (116 kg)

Career information
- High school: Ypsilanti (MI)
- College: Jackson State
- NFL draft: 2009: undrafted

Career history
- Cleveland Browns (2009–2012); New England Patriots (2013)*; Arizona Cardinals (2013–2014); Ottawa Redblacks (2016)*
- * Offseason or practice squad member only

Awards and highlights
- Grey Cup champion (2016); First-team All-SWAC

Career NFL statistics
- Total tackles: 71
- Sacks: 15
- Forced fumbles: 1
- Stats at Pro Football Reference

Marcus Benard (born July 26, 1985) is an American former professional football player who was a linebacker in the National Football League (NFL). He was signed by the Cleveland Browns as an undrafted free agent in 2009. He played college football at Jackson State Tigers.

== Professional career ==
=== Cleveland Browns ===
Benard was promoted from the Browns practice squad to the active roster on November 9, 2009. He had 7.5 sacks in 2010, his best season as a pro. After playing in only four games in 2011 due to injury, Benard was injured again in training camp and waived/injured by the Browns on August 27, 2012.

=== New England Patriots ===
Benard signed with the New England Patriots and was released on August 30, 2013.

=== Arizona Cardinals ===
Benard signed with the Arizona Cardinals on October 2, 2013.

=== Ottawa Redblacks ===
Benard was signed to the practice roster of the Ottawa Redblacks of the Canadian Football League in October 2016. On November 27, 2016, the Redblacks won the 104th Grey Cup against the Calgary Stampeders.

== Personal life ==
Benard collapsed in the Browns locker room in November 2010, during a press conference.

On October 10, 2011, on his way home from Browns practice, Benard was involved in a motorcycle accident.
