= Blake Costanzo =

American football player (born 1984)

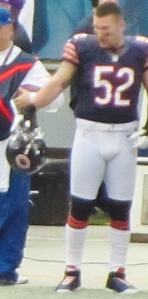
- Costanzo with the Chicago Bears in 2012

No. 51, 52, 54
- Position: Linebacker / Special teamer

Personal information
- Born: April 14, 1984 (age 42); Franklin Lakes, New Jersey, U.S.
- Listed height: 6 ft 1 in (1.85 m)
- Listed weight: 235 lb (107 kg)

Career information
- High school: Ramapo (Franklin Lakes)
- College: Lafayette (PA)
- NFL draft: 2006: undrafted

Career history
- New York Jets (2006–2007)*; → Rhein Fire (2007); Buffalo Bills (2007–2008); Cleveland Browns (2009–2010); San Francisco 49ers (2011); Chicago Bears (2012–2013); San Francisco 49ers (2014)
- * Offseason or practice squad member only

Awards and highlights
- 2× All-Patriot League (2004, 2005); All-NFL Europa (2007)

Career NFL statistics
- Total tackles: 75
- Forced fumbles: 5
- Fumble recoveries: 5
- Stats at Pro Football Reference

Blake Costanzo (born April 14, 1984) is an American former professional football player who was a linebacker in the National Football League (NFL). He played college football for the Lafayette Leopards and was signed by the New York Jets as an undrafted free agent in 2006.

Costanzo was also a member of the Buffalo Bills, Cleveland Browns, San Francisco 49ers, and Chicago Bears.

== Early life ==
He played high school football at Ramapo High School in his New Jersey hometown as a linebacker and a tight end. He helped lead his team to two state championships. He played linebacker and tight end, and was awarded the Defensive Player of the Year Award. In his high school career, he recorded 210 tackles, 24 sacks, and 11 blocked punts. He was named three times to the All-League first-team, as well as the All-Bergen County first-team. In 2001, he was named the Defensive Player of the Year after recording 111 tackles, 15 sacks, and five blocked punts.

== College career ==
=== 2002 ===
In 2002, Costanzo recorded 34 tackles and finish fourth among the Leopard freshmen in tackles. He also made two sacks, while leading the team in forced fumbles with two.

=== 2003 ===
In 2003, he ranked third among the Leopards and seventh in the Patriot League with 94 total tackles. He also blocked a three kicks, and recorded 13 stops and blocked a PAT against the Colgate Raiders. He also recorded 12 tackles and blocked two punts against Towson. He also recorded 12 tackles against Georgetown and Columbia, as well as recording his first career interception against Holy Cross.

=== 2004 ===
In 2004, he was the team's Most Outstanding Linebacker, as he ranked second on the team and seventh in the Patriot League with 93 tackles. He had 5.5 sacks, and recorded 1.5 sacks against Bucknell. Against the Holy Cross Crusaders, he made 12 tackles, forced a fumble, and blocked an extra point. Against the Columbia Lions, he made 11 tackles, a sack and a fumble recovery. Against the Fordham Rams, he recorded a sack vs. Fordham, as well as blocking a fourth-quarter field goal against Colgate, along with recording a sack against Delaware.

== Professional career ==
=== New York Jets ===
Costanzo was signed as an undrafted free agent by the New York Jets in 2006, and was on the practice squad until 2007.

=== Buffalo Bills ===
Costanzo played for the Buffalo Bills in 2007 and 2009 seasons.

=== Cleveland Browns ===
In the 2010 season, Costanzo played in ten games before injuring his groin and being placed on injured reserve.

=== San Francisco 49ers (first stint) ===
Costanzo was signed by the San Francisco 49ers in 2011. Costanzo was notable for forcing a fumble in the 2011–12 NFL playoffs against the New Orleans Saints on a kickoff and recovering another, en route to a 49ers 36–32 victory.

In 61 career games, Costanzo has recorded 71 tackles on special teams with eight forced fumble/fumble recoveries (four force fumbles, four fumble recoveries). In the 2011 season, Costanzo recorded 17 special teams tackles, which ranks second on the 49ers.

=== Chicago Bears ===
Costanzo was signed by the Chicago Bears in 2012 on a two-year deal. General manager Phil Emery commented, "Blake has done some dynamic things as a special teams player, as is evident from his four forced fumbles with one of them in a playoff game against New Orleans this past year."

Costanzo ended the 2013 season leading the Bears with 17 special teams tackles.

=== San Francisco 49ers (second stint) ===
On June 3, 2014, Costanzo signed a one-year deal to return to the 49ers. He was released later in the year.

== Career statistics ==
=== NFL ===
Source Retrieved on September 2, 2014

Career statistics			Tackles			Sacks	Interceptions			Other			
Season	Team	Games	Solo	Ast	Total	Sack	Int	Yds	IntTD	DefTD	FFum	PD	Safety
2007	BUF	3	6	0	6	0	0	0	0	0	0	0	0
2008	BUF	16	15	0	15	0	0	0	0	0	2	0	0
2009	CLE	16	9	5	14	0	0	0	0	0	2	0	0
2010	CLE	10	5	2	7	0	0	0	0	0	0	0	0
2011	SF	16	11	1	12	0	0	0	0	0	0	0	0
2012	CHI	14	6	3	9	0	0	0	0	0	0	0	0
2013	CHI	16	7	2	9	0	0	0	0	0	1	0	0
2014	SF	0	0	0	0	0	0	0	0	0	0	0	0
Career		91	59	13	72	0	0	0	0	0	5	0	0

=== College ===
Year	Defense
Year	GP	GS	Tackles	FF/FR	Sacks	Int	TDs
2002	12	0	34	2/1	2.0	0	0
2003	11	11	94	0/0	4.0	1	0
2004	12	12	93	1/1	5.5	0	0
Totals	35	23	221	3/2	11.5	1	0

== Personal life ==
He is currently an assistant coach at Paramus Catholic High School (New Jersey).
