= Brandon McDonald (gridiron football) =

American gridiron football player (born 1985)

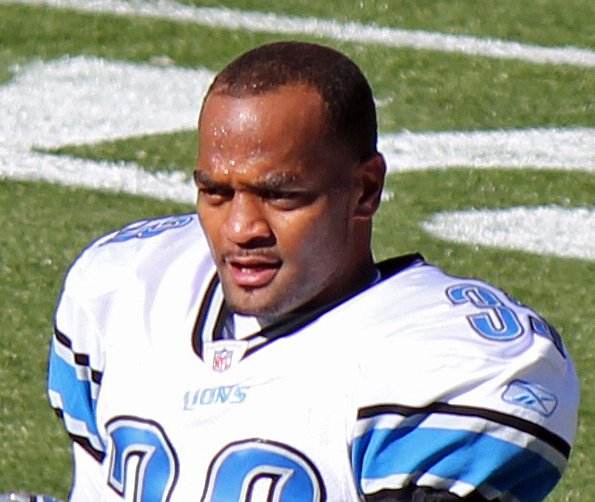
- McDonald with the Detroit Lions in 2011

No. 22, 33, 39
- Position: Cornerback

Personal information
- Born: August 26, 1985 (age 41); Collins, Mississippi, U.S.
- Listed height: 5 ft 10 in (1.78 m)
- Listed weight: 185 lb (84 kg)

Career information
- High school: Collins
- College: Memphis
- NFL draft: 2007: 5th round, 140th overall pick

Career history
- Cleveland Browns (2007−2009); Arizona Cardinals (2010); Detroit Lions (2010−2011); Tampa Bay Buccaneers (2012); Miami Dolphins (2012); Tampa Bay Buccaneers (2012); Calgary Stampeders (2014); Ottawa Redblacks (2014−2015); Calgary Stampeders (2015); Saskatchewan Roughriders (2016)

Career NFL statistics
- Total tackles: 216
- Sacks: 1
- Forced fumbles: 2
- Fumble recoveries: 1
- Interceptions: 9
- Defensive touchdowns: 1
- Stats at Pro Football Reference
- Stats at CFL.ca (archive)

Brandon Randolph McDonald (born August 26, 1985) is an American former professional football cornerback. He was selected by the Cleveland Browns in the fifth round of the 2007 NFL draft. He played college football at Memphis.

McDonald also played for the Arizona Cardinals, Detroit Lions, Tampa Bay Buccaneers, Calgary Stampeders, Ottawa Redblacks, and Saskatchewan Roughriders.

== College career ==
McDonald played Junior College football at Jones County Junior College and transferred to the University of Memphis and started two years there. He lettered for two seasons at JCJC under Coach Parker Dykes. He worked as a receiver during his first season and in the secondary in 2004. He also led JCJC in punt returns during junior college. He was an education major.

== Professional career ==
=== Cleveland Browns ===
McDonald was selected by the Cleveland Browns in the fifth round (140th overall) in the 2007 NFL draft. He made his NFL debut versus the Pittsburgh Steelers on September 9. McDonald had superb performances in games against the Houston Texans in which he had 3 tackles, 4 passes defended, and his 1st career interception, and the New York Jets in which he had 5 tackles, 2 passes defensed and 1 interception.

He finished the season with 16 games played including 2 starts, 24 tackles, 10 passes defensed, and 2 interceptions.

After an injury to teammate Daven Holly, McDonald started for the Cleveland Browns in 2008. He recorded 64 tackles, 11 assists and 5 interceptions. On December 15, 2008, against the Eagles, McDonald returned an interception, right before halftime, 98 yards only to be tackled out of bounds at the 7 yard line. This play set the record for the longest return in NFL history to not result in a touchdown. Later in the game, McDonald did return an interception 22 yards for a touchdown,

The 2009 campaign for Brandon McDonald was a difficult one for him, after being burned many times and eventually being replaced in the starting lineup by safety Mike Adams who outperformed him. He recorded 55 tackles, 1 sack, and 1 interceptions in the 2009 season. 2009 was also the year Steve McNair was murdered. He was Brandon Mcdonald's cousin.

McDonald was cut a week before the start of the 2010 season.

=== Arizona Cardinals ===
On September 5, 2010, McDonald was claimed off waivers by the Arizona Cardinals from the Browns. He was waived on October 26.

=== Detroit Lions ===
On October 27, 2010, McDonald was claimed off waivers by the Detroit Lions.

=== Tampa Bay Buccaneers ===
McDonald was signed by the Tampa Bay Buccaneers on August 20, 2012.

=== Miami Dolphins ===
On November 7, 2012, he was claimed off waivers by the Miami Dolphins.

=== Calgary Stampeders ===
McDonald was signed by the Calgary Stampeders on July 16, 2014. He was released by the Stampeders on September 3, 2014.

=== Ottawa Redblacks ===
McDonald signed with the Ottawa Redblacks on September 15, 2014. Part-way through the 2015 CFL season McDonald was released by the Redblacks because he committed too many penalties.

== NFL career statistics ==
Legend
**Bold**	Career high

Year	Team	Games		Tackles					Interceptions					Fumbles			
Year	Team	GP	GS	Cmb	Solo	Ast	Sck	TFL	Int	Yds	TD	Lng	PD	FF	FR	Yds	TD
2007	CLE	16	2	24	19	5	0.0	0	2	0	0	0	10	0	0	0	0
2008	CLE	16	15	**75**	**64**	**11**	0.0	**5**	**5**	**146**	**1**	**98**	**16**	**1**	0	0	0
2009	CLE	16	10	55	49	6	**1.0**	2	1	39	0	39	10	**1**	0	0	0
2010	ARI	2	0	0	0	0	0.0	0	0	0	0	0	0	0	0	0	0
2010	DET	6	2	19	16	3	0.0	0	0	0	0	0	1	0	**1**	-5	0
2011	DET	13	0	19	13	6	0.0	0	0	0	0	0	2	0	0	0	0
2012	TAM	11	2	24	16	8	0.0	1	1	40	0	40	2	0	0	0	0
Career		80	31	216	177	39	1.0	8	9	225	1	98	41	2	1	-5	0

== Personal life ==
McDonald was born August 26, 1985, to Lisa McDonald Gant and James Spencer in Collins, Mississippi. He is a 2003 graduate of Collins High School, where he was a contributing member of the repeat State Champion Tigers (back-to-back) under head coach Bruce Merchant. He also lettered in basketball and baseball. He is the cousin of former NFL running back Correll Buckhalter and former NFL quarterback Steve McNair.
