= Louis Leonard =

American football player (born 1984)

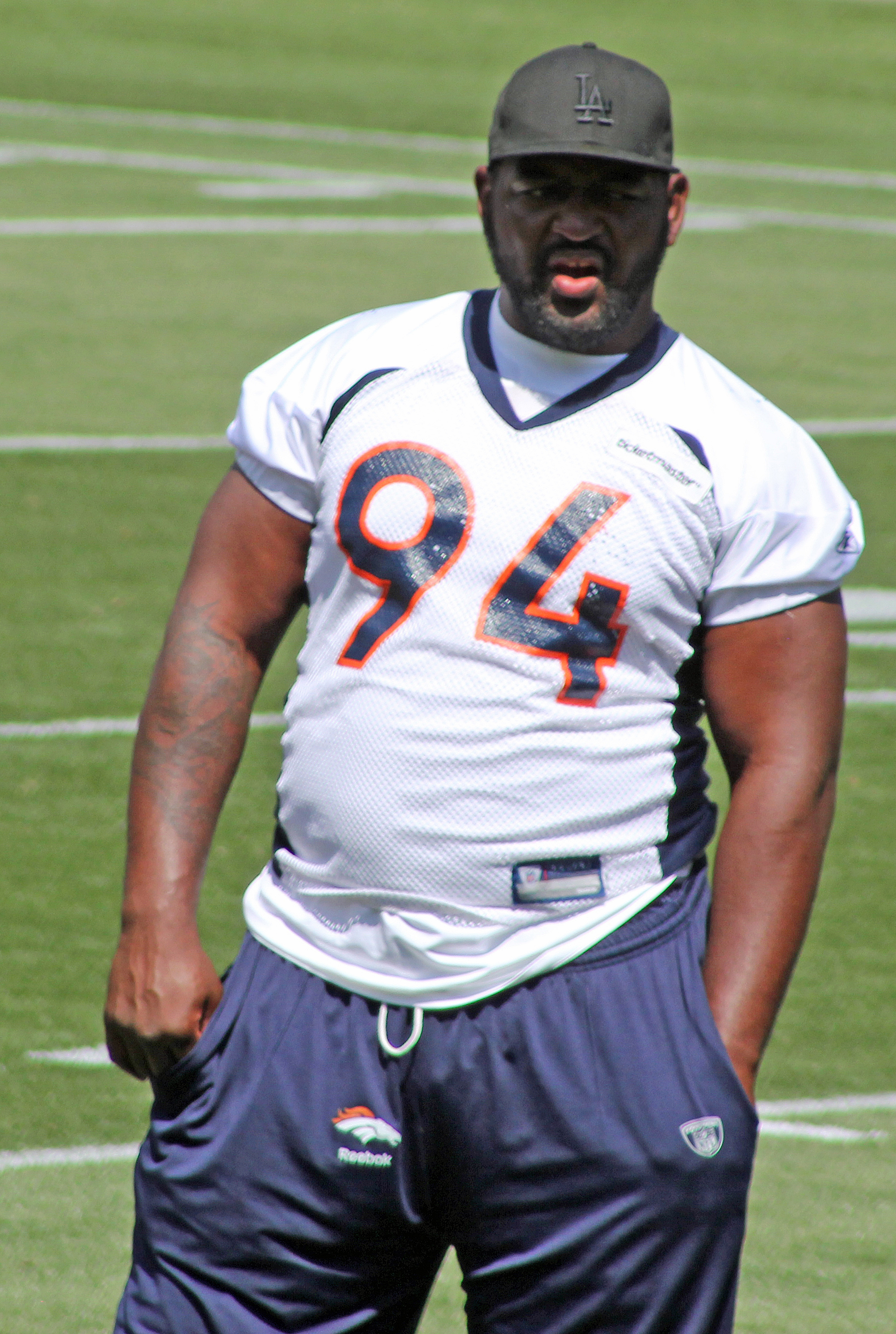
- Leonard in 2011

No. 93, 94, 66
- Position: Defensive tackle

Personal information
- Born: July 16, 1984 (age 42); Los Angeles, California, U.S.
- Listed height: 6 ft 4 in (1.93 m)
- Listed weight: 325 lb (147 kg)

Career information
- High school: Verbum Dei (Los Angeles)
- College: Fresno State
- NFL draft: 2007: undrafted

Career history
- San Diego Chargers (2007)*; St. Louis Rams (2007); Cleveland Browns (2007–2008); Carolina Panthers (2009–2010); New England Patriots (2010); Denver Broncos (2010)
- * Offseason or practice squad member only

Career NFL statistics
- Total tackles: 33
- Sacks: 1
- Stats at Pro Football Reference

Louis Apprecicio Leonard (born July 16, 1984) is an American former professional football player who was a defensive tackle in the National Football League (NFL). He played college football for the Fresno State Bulldogs and was signed by the San Diego Chargers as an undrafted free agent in 2007.

Leonard also played for the St. Louis Rams, Cleveland Browns, Carolina Panthers, New England Patriots, and Denver Broncos.

== Early life ==
Born in Los Angeles and raised in nearby Compton, Leonard attended Verbum Dei High School in Los Angeles, where as a senior he made 106 tackles (18 for a loss), seven sacks, and four fumble recoveries. He was a first-team All-CIF and All-League selection, and was named to the Los Angeles Times' All-Central City first-team.

== College career ==
Leonard played college football for the Fresno State Bulldogs. After redshirting in 2002, Leonard played in nine games as a freshman in 2003, recording five tackles. In 2004, Leonard played in nine games, starting three, and had eight tackles. As a junior in 2005, he started all 13 games, finishing with 26 tackles and 2.5 sacks. In 2006, his final season, Leonard started all 12 games, recording 26 tackles and three sacks.

== Professional career ==
=== San Diego Chargers ===
Leonard was originally signed by the San Diego Chargers as an undrafted rookie free agent on May 4, 2007, was waived on September 1, 2007, and re-signed to the team's practice squad two days later.

=== St. Louis Rams ===
After spending the first week of the 2007 season on the Chargers' practice squad, Leonard was signed by the St. Louis Rams to their active roster on September 12, 2007, but was waived on October 6, 2007, after being inactive for three games.

=== Cleveland Browns ===
Leonard was claimed by the Cleveland Browns off waivers on October 8, 2007. He played in four games during his rookie season. With the Browns in 2008, Leonard played in all 16 games, starting four at defensive end in place of an injured Shaun Smith. He finished his second season with 25 tackles.

=== Carolina Panthers ===
Leonard was traded to the Carolina Panthers in exchange for a sixth-round selection in the 2010 NFL draft on September 1, 2009. He played in two games for the Panthers, starting one, and recording six tackles before being placed on injured reserve with a fractured ankle on September 22, 2009. Leonard was re-signed as a restricted free agent after the season but was waived on September 28, 2010, after playing in two games for the Panthers in 2010.

=== New England Patriots ===
Leonard was signed by the New England Patriots on December 15, 2010. He was waived by the Patriots on December 21, 2010.

=== Denver Broncos ===
Leonard was signed by the Denver Broncos on December 27, 2010.
