= Keith Grennan =

American football player (born 1984)

No. 96
- Position: Defensive end

Personal information
- Born: May 20, 1984 (age 42); Edmonds, Washington, U.S.
- Listed height: 6 ft 4 in (1.93 m)
- Listed weight: 298 lb (135 kg)

Career information
- High school: Edmonds Woodway
- College: Eastern Washington
- NFL draft: 2007: undrafted

Career history
- San Diego Chargers (2007–2008); Cleveland Browns (2009–2010)*; Hartford Colonials (2010–2011)*
- * Offseason or practice squad member only

Career NFL statistics
- Total tackles: 1
- Stats at Pro Football Reference

Keith Grennan (born May 20, 1984) is an American former professional football player who was a defensive end in the National Football League (NFL). He was signed by the San Diego Chargers as an undrafted free agent in 2007. He played college football for the Eastern Washington Eagles.

He was also a member of the Cleveland Browns and Hartford Colonials.

== Early life ==
Grennan graduated from Edmonds-Woodway High School in 2002. He was a first-team All-WesCo 4A South League selection and was a Seattle Times All-Area performer. He helped block for running back Kyle Thew, who had a pair of 300-yard rushing games. He bench pressed 395 pounds on two occasions during his senior year and achieved a 4.9-second mark in the 40-yard dash.

== College career ==
In 2006, he was Honorable Mention All-Big Sky Conference choice as senior. In 2005, he started four games at defensive tackle, including Eastern's last three games of the year. In 2004, he lost a year of eligibility after having to sit out the 2004 season because of NCAA transfer rules. CWU: Played as a tight end in the 2003 season at Central Washington University after redshirting in 2002. He finished the 2003 season with 12 catches for 157 yards (13.1 per catch) with no touchdowns.

== Professional career ==
=== San Diego Chargers ===
Grennan signed two-year contract with the San Diego Chargers as an undrafted free agent on May 4, 2007.

=== Cleveland Browns ===
Grennan was signed to the Cleveland Browns' practice squad prior to the 2009 offseason. He was waived on October 9, 2009, and re-signed to the practice squad on October 20.

After his contract expired following the 2009 season, Grennan was re-signed to a future contract on January 5, 2010.

=== UFL ===
Grennan signed with the United Football League Hartford Colonials for the 2011 season. He became a free agent on August 10, 2011, when the Colonials were contracted by the UFL.
