= Lawrence Vickers =

American football player (born 1983)

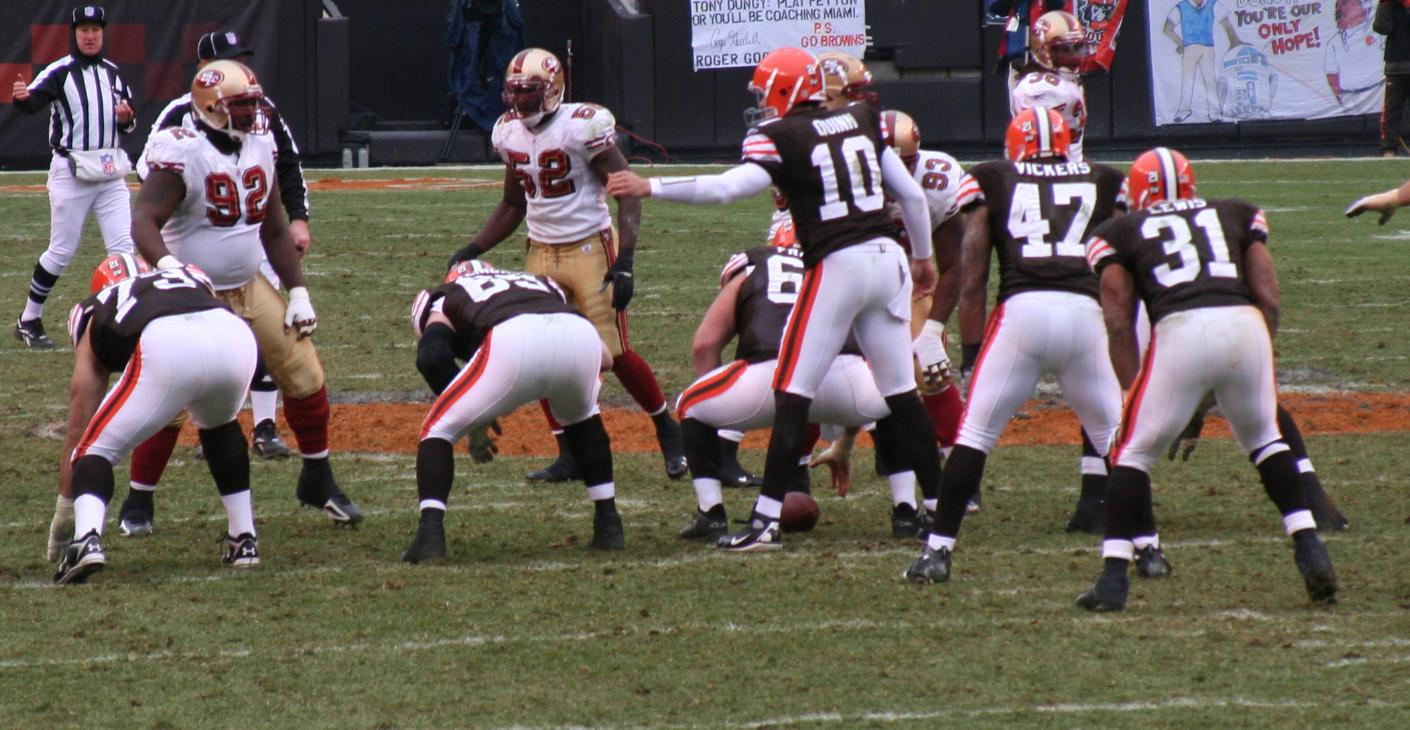
- Vickers (47) lines up against the San Francisco 49ers in December 2007

No. 47
- Position: Fullback

Personal information
- Born: May 8, 1983 (age 43); Beaumont, Texas, U.S.
- Listed height: 6 ft 0 in (1.83 m)
- Listed weight: 250 lb (113 kg)

Career information
- High school: Forest Brook (Houston, Texas)
- College: Colorado
- NFL draft: 2006: 6th round, 180th overall pick

Career history
- Cleveland Browns (2006−2010); Houston Texans (2011); Dallas Cowboys (2012)

Career NFL statistics
- Rushing attempts: 37
- Rushing yards: 98
- Receptions: 58
- Receiving yards: 404
- Receiving touchdowns: 3
- Stats at Pro Football Reference

Lawrence Blanchard Vickers Jr. (born May 8, 1983) is an American former professional football player who was a fullback in the National Football League (NFL). He played college football for the Colorado Buffaloes and was selected by the Cleveland Browns in the sixth round of the 2006 NFL draft.

== Early life ==
Vickers started playing football as a 7th grader at E. O. Smith Education center in Houston. He enrolled at Phillis Wheatley High School and later transferred to Forest Brook High School, where he was a three-year letterman.

== College career ==
He played for the Colorado Buffaloes during his college career. Vickers saw limited playing time as a true freshman in 2002. He saw action in 11 games, including the Alamo Bowl (no starts), seeing time on both offense (at fullback) and on special teams; he was a regular at the end of the year in CU's Stack-I formation (two fullbacks). He had seven rushes for 25 yards on the year, and also caught one pass for seven yards. In 2003, he played in 11 games on both offense and special teams, started six of those games at FB and finished with 100 yards on 28 carries with one touchdown. He also finished with 15 receptions for 123 yards and one touchdown. As a junior in 2004, Vickers started seven games and finished with 63 carries for 252 yards and two touchdowns, and 28 receptions for 290 yards. He remained the Buffs No. 1 FB and backup RB as a senior in 2005, when he finished with 258 yards and nine touchdowns on 73 carries and 152 yards and two touchdowns on 26 receptions. He was an Ethnic Studies/Sociology major.

== Professional career ==
Pre-draft measurables
| Height | Weight | Arm length | Hand span | 40-yard dash | 10-yard split | 20-yard split | 20-yard shuttle | Three-cone drill | Vertical jump | Broad jump | Bench press |
|---|---|---|---|---|---|---|---|---|---|---|---|
| 6 ft 0 1/4 in (1.84 m) | 245 lb (111 kg) | 31 1/2 in (0.80 m) | 10 in (0.25 m) | 4.77 s | 1.69 s | 2.82 s | 4.63 s | 7.74 s | 32.0 in (0.81 m) | 8 ft 8 in (2.64 m) | 21 reps |
All values from NFL Combine/Pro Day

=== Cleveland Browns ===
Vickers was selected by the Cleveland Browns in the sixth round (180th overall) of the 2006 NFL draft. Serving as the team's backup fullback behind Terrelle Smith, Vickers started one game, earning three rushing attempts for two yards and catching six passes for 60 yards. He saw significant time on special teams, having five kick returns for 84 yards. He made his NFL debut versus the New Orleans Saints on September 10.

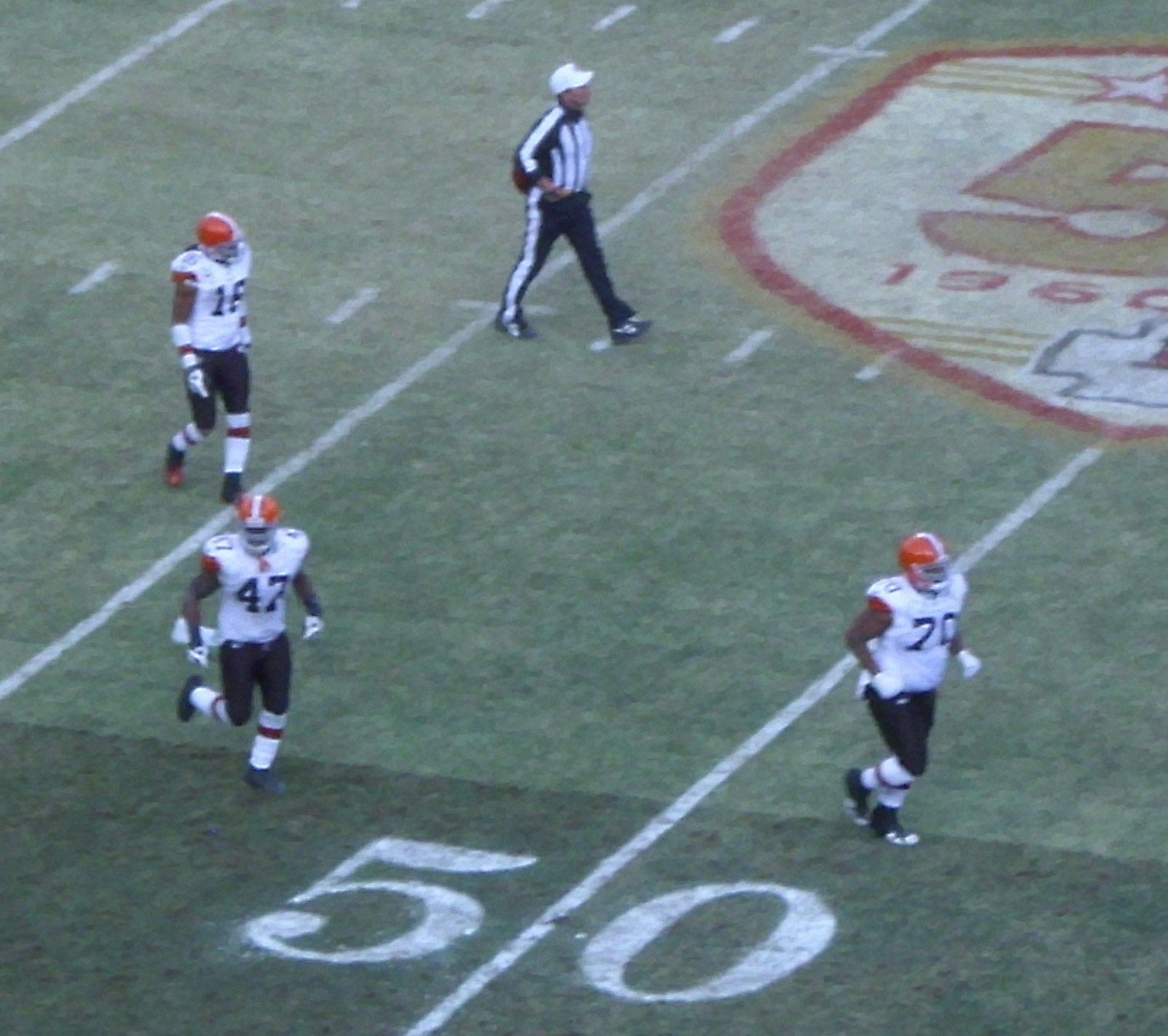
Vickers (47) in 2009

Vickers took over the fullback position in 2007 and played in every game with 14 starts. He was Jamal Lewis' primary lead blocker, helping him rush for 1,304 yards and 9 touchdowns. He also had 15 carries for 43 yards and 13 receptions for 91 yards and 2 touchdowns. For his efforts, Vickers was named as a second alternate for the 2008 Pro Bowl at fullback.

In his four seasons, Vickers scored 3 touchdowns, all on short-yardage receptions. All of his touchdowns were scored against the division rival Pittsburgh Steelers.

=== Houston Texans ===
On August 3, 2011, Lawrence Vickers signed with the Houston Texans.

Vickers was released by Houston on March 13, 2012.

=== Dallas Cowboys ===
Vickers was signed to a two-year deal by the Dallas Cowboys on March 14, 2012.

The Cowboys waived him on July 12, 2013.
