= Gerard Lawson =

American football player (born 1985)

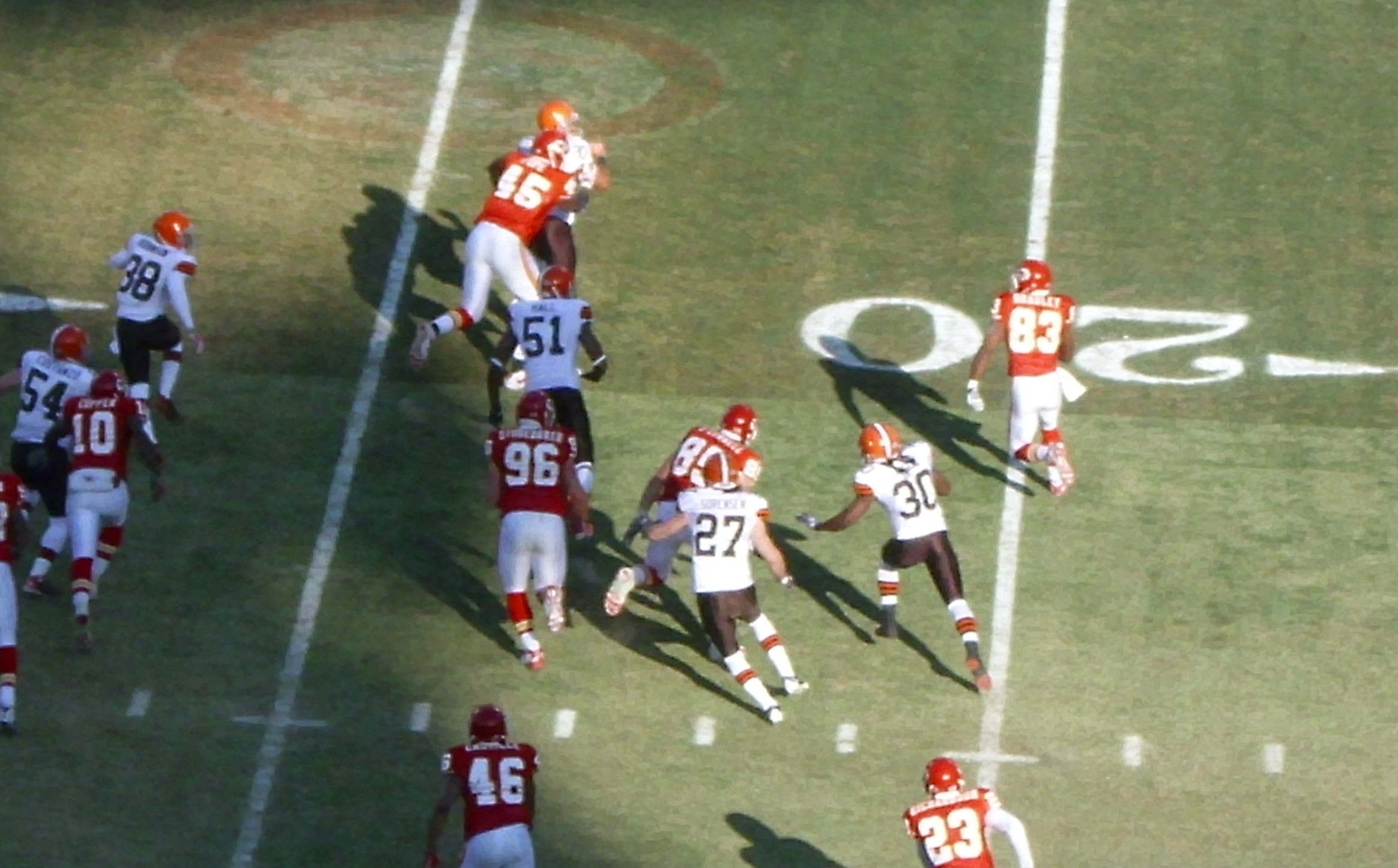
- Lawson (#30) chases after Mark Bradley in 2009

No. 30, 47, 22
- Position: Cornerback / Return specialist

Personal information
- Born: January 12, 1985 (age 41); North Las Vegas, Nevada, U.S.
- Listed height: 5 ft 10 in (1.78 m)
- Listed weight: 195 lb (88 kg)

Career information
- High school: Palo Verde (Las Vegas, Nevada)
- College: Oregon State
- NFL draft: 2008: undrafted

Career history
- Cleveland Browns (2008–2009); Hartford Colonials (2010); Philadelphia Eagles (2010); BC Lions (2012–2013)

Career NFL statistics
- Total tackles: 3
- Fumble recoveries: 1
- Return yards: 167
- Stats at Pro Football Reference
- Stats at CFL.ca (archive)

Gerard Lawson (born January 12, 1985) is an American former professional football player who was a cornerback and kickoff returner in the National Football League (NFL). He played college football for the Oregon State Beavers. He also participated in the 2007 Hula Bowl All Star game, where he was awarded the most valuable player award. He was signed by the Cleveland Browns as an undrafted free agent in 2008.

Lawson also played for the Hartford Colonials, Philadelphia Eagles and BC Lions.

== Professional career ==
=== Cleveland Browns ===
Lawson was signed to a one-year contract by the Cleveland Browns as an undrafted free agent following the 2008 NFL draft on April 28, 2008. He played in 20 games for the Browns from 2008–2009, making five special teams tackles and four kickoff returns for 115 yards.

=== Hartford Colonials ===
Lawson played with the Hartford Colonials of the United Football League in 2010 following his release from the Browns. He returned an interception 41 yards for a touchdown in his debut for the Colonials, and had 23 kickoff returns for 483 yards during the season.

=== Philadelphia Eagles ===
Lawson was signed to a three-year contract by the Philadelphia Eagles on December 24, 2010, to replace Jorrick Calvin, who was placed on injured reserve. He was released on July 28, 2011.

=== BC Lions ===
Lawson was signed by the BC Lions on April 24, 2012. He was released by the Lions on June 16, 2013.
