= 2006 Cleveland Browns season =

58th season in franchise history

- Owner: Randy Lerner
- General manager: Phil Savage
- Head coach: Romeo Crennel
- Home stadium: Cleveland Browns Stadium

Results
- Record: 4–12
- Division place: 4th AFC North
- Playoffs: Did not qualify
- Pro Bowlers: None

The 2006 Cleveland Browns season was the team’s 58th season as a professional sports franchise and its 54th season as a member of the National Football League (NFL). It began with the team attempting to improve upon their win–loss record from 2005, where the team ended the year at 6–10. They were one of the most active teams during the free agency period, and looked to be one of the most improved teams of the season at the end of the NFL Draft. They experienced many setbacks during training camp, from which they never fully recovered. By the end of the season they had finished 4–12, losing two more games than the previous season.

== Offseason ==
=== Free agency ===
The Cleveland Browns’ front office was busy during the first several days off the freeagent signing period, looking to help the team by signing players who they felt would make immediate impacts upon the team. On the first day, the Browns signed center LeCharles Bentley, wide receiver Joe Jurevicius, and offensive tackle Kevin Shaffer. Bentley and Shaffer were signed to help protect second-year quarterback Charlie Frye in the pocket, and Jurevicius was signed to provide veteran support to the Browns' young receiving corps, which then-consisted of Braylon Edwards, Josh Cribbs, and veteran Dennis Northcutt. On the second day of the free-agent period, the Browns signed punter Dave Zastudil to replace Kyle Richardson, and to establish a good punting game. An interesting fact about the Browns' free-agent signings deals with the fact that Bentley, Jurevicius, and Zastudil are each Ohio-natives, and expressed their wish to play for the Browns at some point in their careers. A day after signing Zastudil, the Browns signed veteran nose tackle Ted Washington in an attempt to improve the Browns' run defense. After signing Washington, the Browns made their final key free-agent signing, by inking a deal with linebacker Willie McGinest. McGinest was signed to provide veteran support among the Browns' linebacking corps, and brought back under the direction of head coach Romeo Crennel, who coached McGinest defensively through three Super Bowls while in New England.

=== 2006 NFL draft ===
As the 2006 NFL draft neared in late April, the Browns had already filled in many of their holes through free agency, and would primarily be looking for players who would help the 4–3 defense. The Browns had their eyes set on Haloti Ngata, who they would presumably build up to take over for Ted Washington. On the day of the draft, the Browns traded their 12th pick to the Baltimore Ravens for the 13th pick and a 6th round pick. Baltimore used the pick to take Ngata, while the Browns selected outside linebacker Kamerion Wimbley, the player who Cleveland GM Phil Savage had wanted the whole time. The selection of inside linebacker D'Qwell Jackson in the second round created a linebacker core of Andra Davis, Jackson, McGinest, and Wimbley. Wide receiver Travis Wilson was selected in the 3rd round as a developmental project and future possession receiver. On day two of the draft, seven other players were taken; linebacker Leon Williams, offensive tackle Isaac Sowells, running back Jerome Harrison, cornerback DeMario Minter, fullback Lawrence Vickers, nose tackle Babatunde Oshinowo, and safety Justin Hamilton. Minter ended up being the only rookie not playing a down that season due to injury. The way the Browns handled the draft was mostly praised, filling in their voids and finding future starters in late rounds.

2006 Cleveland Browns draft
Round	Pick	Player	Position	College	Notes
1	13	Kamerion Wimbley	LB	Florida State	
2	34	D'Qwell Jackson	LB	Maryland	
3	78	Travis Wilson	WR	Oklahoma	
4	110	Leon Williams	LB	Miami (FL)	
4	112	Isaac Sowells	OT	Indiana	
5	145	Jerome Harrison	RB	Washington State	
5	152	DeMario Minter	CB	Georgia	
6	180	Lawrence Vickers	FB	Colorado	
6	181	Babatunde Oshinowo	DT	Stanford	
7	222	Justin Hamilton	S	Virginia Tech	
Made roster † Pro Football Hall of Fame * Made at least one Pro Bowl during career

=== Trades ===
During the 2006 offseason, the Cleveland Browns made two significant trades. Their first would be trading veteran quarterback Trent Dilfer to the San Francisco 49ers for fourth-year quarterback Ken Dorsey. The trade was an important step in solidifying second-year quarterback Charlie Frye as the Browns' starting quarterback heading into the 2006 regular season. The other important trade the Browns made would fill the void at center left by newly acquired free agent LeCharles Bentley. The Browns traded a conditional 2008 draft choice to the Philadelphia Eagles for center Hank Fraley. The Browns subsequently signed Fraley to a one-year contract.

=== Center troubles during training camp ===
On July 27, the first day of the Cleveland Browns' training camp, free agent center LeCharles Bentley suffered a season-ending knee injury during the first contact play of camp. Bentley was quoted as saying, "No one touched me. It was a freak thing. I took two steps, felt the injury and that was it. It felt like someone had kicked me." Bentley also said that he's "[...] never been a patient person", and that "[...] [l]earning to adjust my body and my limitations is going to be a difficult challenge. When it's all said and done, it's going to make me better." Bentley was expected to help protect second-year quarterback Charlie Frye.

After news of Bentley's injuring, backup center Bob Hallen left training camp, leaving the team without a center. On July 30, the Browns signed veteran center Todd Washington. On August 7, Washington announced his retirement. On August 12, Hallen announced his retirement, citing two herniated discs and stenosis as the reason for his retirement. The Browns faced even more problems when third-string center Alonzo Ephraim, who was signed following Bentley's injury, was suspended for substance abuse. August 17 saw the Browns center woes diminishing slightly, as they acquired Ross Tucker from the Patriots. On August 24, the Browns acquired center Lennie Friedman from the Chicago Bears for a conditional 2007 draft choice. On September 2, the Browns finally found what they had been looking for when they traded a conditional 2008 draft choice to the Philadelphia Eagles for center Hank Fraley. Upon signing Fraley, Ross Tucker's contract was terminated.

== Preseason ==
The Cleveland Browns started off with a 20–7 loss to the Philadelphia Eagles. Next, they managed to get their first preseason win at home 20–16 against the Detroit Lions. They then won their first preseason away game 20–17 against the Buffalo Bills, before losing their final preseason game at home against the Chicago Bears 20–7. The Cleveland Browns came out of their preseason with a record of 2–2. Their performance during the pre-season showed promise for the team heading into the regular season.

== Personnel ==
2006 Cleveland Browns staff
Front office: Owner – Randy Lerner; Senior vice president and General manager - Phil Savage; Director of Player Personnel - Bill Rees; Assistant Director of Player Personnel - T.J. McCreight; Pro Personnel Coordinator - Steve Sabo; Executive advisor - Jim Brown; Head coaches: Head coach – Romeo Crennel; Offensive coaches: Offensive coordinator – Maurice Carthon (Resigned after week 7); Interim offensive coordinator and Offensive Line - Jeff Davidson; Quarterbacks – Rip Scherer; Running backs – Dave Atkins; Wide receivers – Terry Robiskie; Tight ends – Ben Coates; Assistant offensive line – Jeff Uhlenhake; Offensive quality control - Carl Crennel II	Defensive coaches: Defensive coordinator – Todd Grantham; Defensive line – Randy Melvin; Linebackers – Mike Haluchak; Secondary – Mel Tucker; Defensive assistant – Bobby Trott; Defensive quality control - Cory Undlin; Special teams coaches: Special teams coordinator – Jerry Rosburg; Strength and conditioning: Head strength and conditioning – John Lott; Assistant strength and conditioning – Tom Myslinski

== Final roster ==
2006 Cleveland Browns roster
Quarterbacks (QB): 12 Lang Campbell; 11 Ken Dorsey; 9 Charlie Frye; Running backs (RB): 23 Chris Barclay; 34 Reuben Droughns; 35 Jerome Harrison; 42 Terrelle Smith FB; 47 Lawrence Vickers FB; Wide receivers (WR): 16 Josh Cribbs; 17 Braylon Edwards; 84 Joe Jurevicius; 18 Kendrick Mosley; 86 Dennis Northcutt; 81 Travis Wilson; Tight ends (TE): 87 Darnell Dinkins; 82 Steve Heiden; 80 Kellen Winslow II	Offensive linemen (OL): 63 Joe Andruzzi G; 70 Nat Dorsey T; 66 Hank Fraley C; 62 Lennie Friedman G; 67 Fred Matua G; 77 Kevin Shaffer T; 50 Rob Smith G; 61 Isaac Sowells T; Defensive linemen (DL): 98 Nick Eason DE; 75 Simon Fraser DE; 93 Orien Harris DE; 97 Alvin McKinley DE; 96 Babatunde Oshinowo NT; 92 Ted Washington NT	Linebackers (LB): 54 Andra Davis ILB; 55 Willie McGinest OLB; 90 David McMillan OLB; 59 Clifton Smith ILB; 56 Nick Speegle OLB; 52 Matt Stewart OLB; 51 Chaun Thompson ILB; 53 Mason Unck ILB; 94 Leon Williams ILB; 95 Kamerion Wimbley OLB; Defensive backs (DB): 28 Leigh Bodden CB; 20 Ralph Brown CB; 36 Ben Emanuel FS; 38 Therrian Fontenot CB; 25 Justin Hamilton SS; 39 Daven Holly CB; 26 Sean Jones SS; 31 Jereme Perry CB; 21 Brodney Pool S; Special teams (ST): 4 Phil Dawson K; 64 Ryan Pontbriand LS; 15 Dave Zastudil P	Practice squad: 74 Andrew Hoffman DT (IR); 91 Charlton Keith LB; 79 Pete Lougheed OT; 85 Buck Ortega TE; 30 Antonio Perkins CB; 83 Steve Sanders WR; 37 Justin Sandy S; 73 Alvin Smith NT; Reserve: 3 Derek Anderson QB (IR); 24 Gary Baxter CB (IR); 57 LeCharles Bentley C (IR); 71 Kelly Butler T (IR); 60 Cosey Coleman G (IR); 58 D'Qwell Jackson LB (IR); 78 Ethan Kelley DE (IR); 43 Jeremy LeSueur S (IR); 33 Daylon McCutcheon CB (IR); 22 DeMario Minter CB (IR); 69 J'Vonne Parker NT (IR); 99 Orpheus Roye DE (IR); 27 Brian Russell S (IR); 72 Ryan Tucker T (NF-Inj.); 29 Jason Wright RB (IR); Rookies in italics 53 active, 16 reserve, 7 practice squad

== Regular season ==
=== Schedule ===
Week	Date	Opponent	Result	Stadium	Record	Box Scores	Attendance
1	September 10	New Orleans Saints	**L** 14–19	Cleveland Browns Stadium	0–1	GameCenter	72,915
2	September 17	at **Cincinnati Bengals**	**L** 17–34	Paul Brown Stadium	0–2	GameCenter	66,072
3	September 24	**Baltimore Ravens**	**L** 14–15	Cleveland Browns Stadium	0–3	GameCenter	72,474
4	October 1	at Oakland Raiders	**W** 24–21	McAfee Coliseum	1–3	GameCenter	61,426
5	October 8	at Carolina Panthers	**L** 12–20	Bank of America Stadium	1–4	GameCenter	73,520
6	Bye						
7	October 22	Denver Broncos	**L** 7–17	Cleveland Browns Stadium	1–5	GameCenter	73,024
8	October 29	New York Jets	**W** 20–13	Cleveland Browns Stadium	2–5	GameCenter	72,507
9	November 5	at San Diego Chargers	**L** 25–32	Qualcomm Stadium	2–6	GameCenter	65,558
10	November 12	at Atlanta Falcons	**W** 17–13	Georgia Dome	3–6	GameCenter	70,793
11	November 19	**Pittsburgh Steelers**	**L** 20–24	Cleveland Browns Stadium	3–7	GameCenter	73,296
12	November 26	**Cincinnati Bengals**	**L** 0–30	Cleveland Browns Stadium	3–8	GameCenter	72,926
13	December 3	Kansas City Chiefs	**W** 31–28	Cleveland Browns Stadium	4–8	GameCenter	71,927
14	December 7	at **Pittsburgh Steelers**	**L** 7–27	Heinz Field	4–9	GameCenter	55,246
15	December 17	at **Baltimore Ravens**	**L** 17–27	M&T Bank Stadium	4–10	GameCenter	70,857
16	December 24	Tampa Bay Buccaneers	**L** 7–22	Cleveland Browns Stadium	4–11	GameCenter	69,603
17	December 31	at Houston Texans	**L** 6–14	Reliant Stadium	4–12	GameCenter	70,097

Note: Intra-divisional opponents are in bold text.

=== Game summaries ===
==== Week 1 vs New Orleans Saints ====
	1	2	3	4	Total
**Saints**	3	6	7	3	**19**
Browns	0	0	7	7	**14**

at Cleveland Browns Stadium, Cleveland, Ohio

On the first play from scrimmage, quarterback Charlie Frye completed a 74-yard touchdown pass to wide receiver Braylon Edwards. However, because of a holding penalty on tackle Kevin Shaffer, the play was called back. The Browns would only manage 56 yards of total offense during the first half of play. By halftime, New Orleans was leading the game 9–0, because of three field goals (43 yards in the first quarter, 25 and 21 yards in the second) by kicker John Carney.

In the second half, Frye completed an 18-yard touchdown pass to tight end Kellen Winslow, marking his first career touchdown reception. However, the Saints burgeoned their lead, with opposing quarterback Drew Brees completing a 12-yard touchdown pass to wide receiver Marques Colston. In the fourth quarter, Frye brought the Browns within two points of the lead when he rushed for a 1-yard touchdown. A 20-yard field goal from Carney put the Saints up for good, 19–14. The Browns were threatening in Saints territory as the clock was winding down, but a Frye pass deflected off Edwards' chest and into the hands of safety Josh Bullocks. This would be the Browns' last loss to the Saints until 2018.

==== Week 2 at Cincinnati Bengals ====
	1	2	3	4	Total
Browns	3	0	0	14	**17**
**Bengals**	14	3	0	17	**34**

at Paul Brown Stadium, Cincinnati

The Browns traveled to Cincinnati for their week two match-up against the Cincinnati Bengals at Paul Brown Stadium.

The Browns offense struggled for the second straight week, turning in only 56 rushing yards. Despite Charlie Frye passing for 244 yards, he threw no touchdowns and two interceptions. The Bengals scored three times in the first half. Wide receiver Kelley Washington caught a 22-yard touchdown pass from quarterback Carson Palmer, and wide receiver Chad Johnson caught an 8-yard touchdown pass from Palmer, in the first quarter. Kicker Shayne Graham added three more points in the second quarter with a 37-yard field goal. Phil Dawson put the Browns' only points on the board in the first quarter with a 30-yard field goal.

The second half was slightly better for the Browns, with their defense holding the Bengals scoreless in the third quarter. After a field goal from 37 yards by Graham in the fourth quarter, the Browns capped off a 76-yard drive with Reuben Droughns' first rushing touchdown of the season. The Browns had excellent field position for that drive because of a 75-yard pass from Frye to Braylon Edwards. Running back Rudi Johnson then scored two touchdowns from 1 yard and 9 yards out. Charlie Frye put the Browns' final points on the board when he ran in from two yards out for the score. In the end though, the Browns would end up losing Round 1 of 2006's Battle for Ohio.

==== Week 3 vs Baltimore Ravens ====
	1	2	3	4	Total
**Ravens**	3	0	0	12	**15**
Browns	0	14	0	0	**14**

at Cleveland Browns Stadium, Cleveland, Ohio

The Browns returned home, still searching for their first win of the year, with a Week 3 division battle, against the Baltimore Ravens. The Ravens drew first blood in the first quarter, as kicker Matt Stover kicked a 32-yard field goal for the only score of the quarter. In the second quarter, the Browns came to life, as QB Charlie Frye completed a 58-yard TD pass to WR Braylon Edwards and Frye managed to get a TD on a 1-yard TD run. After a scoreless third quarter, it seemed that Cleveland would finally get its first victory, but in the fourth quarter, the Ravens managed to fly back into the game. QB Steve McNair would complete a 3-yard TD pass to TE Todd Heap. Finally, Stover would help Baltimore steal one from the Browns, with a 43-yard and a 52-yard field goal.

==== Week 4 at Oakland Raiders ====
	1	2	3	4	Total
**Browns**	0	10	14	0	**24**
Raiders	7	14	0	0	**21**

at McAfee Coliseum, Oakland, California

The Browns flew to McAfee Coliseum to take on the Oakland Raiders, still hoping for their first win of the year. From the get-go, things immediately got ugly, as RB Reuben Droughns fumbled and LB Sam Williams picked up the ball for a 30-yard return touchdown. In the second quarter, the Browns' woes continued, as QB Andrew Walter completed a 5-yard TD pass to WR Randy Moss. Cleveland would get a 28-yard field goal by kicker Phil Dawson, but Oakland continued to pour on the hurt as RB LaMont Jordan ran 59 yards for a touchdown. The Browns would get a touchdown before halftime, as QB Charlie Frye completed a 3-yard TD pass to TE Darnell Dinkins. In the third quarter, Cleveland finally managed to click on all cylinders, as Frye completed two more TD passes to TE Kellen Winslow and WR Joe Jurevicius to take the lead. Ultimately, the Browns held on to claim their first win of the season

==== Week 5 at Carolina Panthers ====
	1	2	3	4	Total
Browns	3	0	3	6	**12**
**Panthers**	7	7	3	3	**20**

at Bank of America Stadium, Charlotte, North Carolina

Hoping to build on their win in Oakland, the Browns flew to Bank of America Stadium for a Week 5 match-up with the Carolina Panthers. The Browns would score first, as kicker Phil Dawson got a 41-yard field goal, but the Panthers did better, as CB Richard Marshall intercepted a pass that bounced off WR Dennis Northcutt's hands and returned it 30 yards for a touchdown. In the second quarter, Cleveland's struggles continued as Panthers QB Jake Delhomme completed a 17-yard TD pass to WR Keyshawn Johnson for the only score of the second period. Johnson was being covered by safety Brodney Pool, who was forced to play cornerback due to injuries to Gary Baxter and Leigh Bodden.

In the third quarter, both sides would get field goals, as Carolina kicker John Kasay kicked a 22-yarder, while Dawson made a 47-yard field goal. In the fourth quarter, the Browns got closer with Dawson's 22-yard field goal, but the Panthers managed to put the game away, as Kasay got a 19-yard field goal and gave the Panthers a huge lead. Even though Dawson would make a 32-yard field goal, Cleveland's struggles continued to hurt them.

==== Week 7 vs Denver Broncos ====
	1	2	3	4	Total
**Broncos**	0	10	7	0	**17**
Browns	0	0	0	7	**7**

at Cleveland Browns Stadium, Cleveland, Ohio

Coming off their bye week, the Browns headed back home to Cleveland Browns Stadium for a rendezvous with their old rival, the Denver Broncos.

The Broncos' Jason Elam kicked a 32-yard field goal early in the second quarter for a 3–0 lead. Then, right after the two-minute warning, Tatum Bell rushed to the right for a 9-yard touchdown run. The halftime score was 10–0. In the first half, the Browns offense earned just four first downs, scored no points, and Charlie Frye was sacked three times.

With 9:13 remaining in the third quarter, Jake Plummer connected with rookie Brandon Marshall for a nine-yard touchdown to make the score 17–0. After Champ Bailey intercepted Charlie Frye in the fourth quarter, Andra Davis returned the favor by intercepting Jake Plummer and set the Browns offense up at the Denver 18. Two short plays later, Frye passed to Joe Jurevicius for a 6-yard touchdown catch. It was only the second touchdown allowed by Denver's defense all season and it was the first 4th-quarter touchdown of Charlie Frye's career.

However, Cleveland's last two possessions did not result in a comeback, and Denver held on for a 17–7 victory.

Two days after the game, offensive coordinator Maurice Carthon resigned.

==== Week 8 vs New York Jets ====
	1	2	3	4	Total
Jets	3	0	7	3	**13**
**Browns**	3	7	10	0	**20**

at Cleveland Browns Stadium, Cleveland, Ohio

The Browns entered week 8 against the New York Jets with Jeff Davidson taking over for Carthon as offensive coordinator. An 8-minute opening drive by the Jets would result in a Mike Nugent 27-yard field goal, which the Browns matched with a Phil Dawson 47-yard kick. In the 2nd quarter, an interception by the Browns' Sean Jones set up a 2-yard touchdown run by Reuben Droughns. The Browns failed to score on a deep drive at the end of the half, with Dawson missing a 26-yard field goal try, and the teams headed into the break at 10–3.

The Browns opened the third quarter with a 57-yard drive capped by a Kellen Winslow touchdown reception for 30 yards. Later in the quarter, a Leon Washington fumble led to another field goal for the Browns. Justin Miller would answer back, however, by taking the ensuing kickoff 99 yards for a touchdown. After a Browns punt, the Jets moved down the field and got a 47-yard field goal from Nugent. The Browns offense stalled out in the fourth quarter, but the defense played well. Sean Jones got another interception midway through the fourth quarter, and a late drive by the Jets failed as Chad Pennington's final throw to the endzone was caught by Chris Baker; however, the officials ruled that he would have landed out of bounds even if the Browns' Brodney Pool hadn't pushed him. The play was not reviewed even after the Jets called a time-out for the booth official to think it over, and the Browns hung on to win.

With the win, the Browns improved to 2–5.

==== Week 9 at San Diego Chargers ====
	1	2	3	4	Total
Browns	3	9	0	13	**25**
**Chargers**	3	7	7	15	**32**

at Qualcomm Stadium, San Diego, California

Hoping to build on their home win over the Jets, the Browns flew to Qualcomm Stadium to take on the throwback-clad San Diego Chargers. In the first quarter, things started off close with Chargers kicker Nate Kaeding getting a 29-yard field goal, while Browns kicker Phil Dawson nailed a 37-yarder. In the second quarter, Dawson would get a 20-yard field goal for Cleveland. However, San Diego got the first touchdown of the game, as LB Marques Harris recovered a fumble in the Browns endzone for a touchdown. Dawson would supply the scoring for Cleveland for the rest of the half, as he nailed a 42-yarder and a 30-yarder. In the third quarter, the Chargers gained some momentum, as RB LaDainian Tomlinson, after getting bottled up in the first half, broke out with a 41-yard TD run for the only score of the period. In the fourth quarter, Dawson would get another field goal, which came from 36 yards out. However, San Diego would respond with Tomlinson getting a 7-yard TD run. Cleveland would have Dawson get a 35-yard field goal, yet Tomlinson would get an 8-yard TD run, which was followed by a successful two-point conversion from QB Philip Rivers to WR Vincent Jackson. The Browns would finally get a touchdown, as QB Charlie Frye completed a 4-yard TD pass to WR Braylon Edwards. Unfortunately, the damage was already done. With the loss, Cleveland would fall to 2–6.

==== Week 10: at Atlanta Falcons ====
Week 10: Cleveland Browns at Atlanta Falcons – Game summary

Quarter	1	2	3	4	Total
**Browns**	7	7	0	3	**17**
Falcons	0	3	7	3	**13**

at Georgia Dome, Atlanta

- Date: November 12
- Game time: 1:00 p.m. EST
- Game weather: indoors
- Game attendance: 70,793
- Referee: Larry Nemmers
- TV announcers (CBS): Kevin Harlan (play–by–play) and Rich Gannon (color commentator)

Game information

**First quarter**

- CLE (13:24) – Droughns 1 yard rush (Dawson kick)
  **Browns 7, Falcons 0**

**Second quarter**

- CLE (3:01) – Edwards 19 yard pass from Frye (Dawson kick)
  **Browns 14, Falcons 0**
- ATL (14:57) – Andersen 44 yard field goal
  **Browns 14, Falcons 3**

**Third quarter**

- ATL (13:54) – Jenkins 12 yard pass from Vick (Andersen kick)
  **Browns 14, Falcons 10**

**Fourth quarter**

- ATL (6:08) – Andersen 41 yard field goal
  **Browns 14, Falcons 13**
- CLE (9:25) – Dawson 43 yard field goal
  **Browns 17, Falcons 13**

**Top passers**

- CLE – Charlie Frye 16/22, 165 yds, 1 TD
- ATL – Michael Vick 16/40, 197 yds, 1 TD, 2 INT

**Top rushers**

- CLE – Reuben Droughns 21 carr, 54 yds, 1 TD
- ATL – Michael Vick 7 carr, 74 yds

**Top receivers**

- CLE – Kellen Winslow 5 rec, 90 yds
- ATL – Roddy White 5 rec, 99 yds

**Turnovers**

- CLE – 2
- ATL – 3

Facing a desperate season verging on the point of disaster yet again, the Browns traveled again in Week 10 to the Georgia Dome in Atlanta to meet the Atlanta Falcons. The 5–3 Falcons were determined to rebound from their disappointed Week 9 loss to the Detroit Lions. In the first quarter, nothing happened until very late. With 3:33 remaining in the quarter, Browns quarterback Charlie Frye connected on a 40-yard pass to tight end Kellen Winslow. That put the Browns on the Atlanta 6-yard line and 3 plays later, on 4th and 1, the Browns scored on a run by running back Reuben Droughns and the Browns took a 7–0 lead. The second quarter started with a bang for the Browns. Atlanta had 2nd and 9 on the Cleveland 49 when Falcons quarterback Michael Vick threw an interception to Browns safety Sean Jones. The Browns drove the ball quickly down the field and, with 11:59 remaining in the quarter, Charlie Frye connected with tight end Braylon Edwards on a 19-yard touchdown pass. The Browns lead was 14–0. At the two-minute-warning, Reuben Droughns fumbled on the Atlanta 35. The Falcons attempted a two-minute-drill offense, but the Browns stood Vick up at the Browns 26. However, Falcons kicker Morten Andersen kicked a 44-yard field goal to get on the board 14–3 at halftime

Very little happened in the third quarter. Michael Vick was driving in Cleveland territory with 5:28 remaining when he was intercepted again by Browns safety Brodney Pool. However, the ensuing Browns possession resulted in a Dave Zastudil punt. The punt was out of their own endzone and was returned to the Browns 12. It took two plays for Vick to connect with wide receiver Michael Jenkins for a touchdown. The score was then 14–10. The possibility of success seemed unlikely for the Browns in the fourth quarter. After the teams each went three and out, Atlanta gained favorable field position and were able to bring Andersen in for a 46-yard field goal. At that point the Browns were leading 14–13. The next drive for the Browns looked promising. After two passes to tight end Steve Heiden and a 36-yard pass to Kellen Winslow, the Browns then faltered and had to settle for a 43-yard Phil Dawson field goal. The score was 17–13.

With 3:18 remaining in the game, Atlanta took over on their own 28-yard line. Down by 4, Vick let in loose downfield to an open receiver Roddy White for a 55-yard gain. The Falcons then committed a 10-yard penalty and Vick threw an incomplete pass. With 2nd and 20 on the Cleveland 27, Vick fumbled the ball on 3rd down to a waiting Browns rookie cornerback Jereme Perry. Out of timeouts, the Falcons fell for a second week in a row to the Browns.

==== Week 11 vs Pittsburgh Steelers ====
	1	2	3	4	Total
**Steelers**	0	0	3	21	**24**
Browns	0	10	0	10	**20**

at Cleveland Browns Stadium, Cleveland, Ohio

Hoping to build on their road win over the Falcons, the Browns returned home for Round 1 of their rust belt battle with the Pittsburgh Steelers. After a scoreless first quarter, the Browns struck first as CB Daven Holly returned an interception 57 yards for a touchdown. Later, kicker Phil Dawson completed a 23-yard field goal. In the third quarter, Steelers kicker Jeff Reed completed a 43-yard field goal for the only score of the period. In the fourth quarter, the true nature of the rivalry would commence. Dawson would give Cleveland a 35-yard field goal, but Pittsburgh responded with QB Ben Roethlisberger completing a 20-yard TD pass to rookie WR Santonio Holmes. WR Josh Cribbs would return a kick off 92 yards for a touchdown to give the Browns a 20–10 lead. However, the Steelers would take the lead with RB Willie Parker getting a 1-yard TD run and a 4-yard touchdown reception. The Browns final drive of the game almost came up successful, but QB Charlie Frye's 22-yard pass to WR Braylon Edwards fell incomplete. With the loss, Cleveland fell to last place in the AFC North at 3–7.

==== Week 12 vs Cincinnati Bengals ====
	1	2	3	4	Total
**Bengals**	7	10	6	7	**30**
Browns	0	0	0	0	**0**

at Cleveland Browns Stadium, Cleveland, Ohio

Coming off a devastating home loss to the Pittsburgh Steelers, the Browns stayed at home as they faced the Cincinnati Bengals in Round 2 of the Battle of Ohio. However, this match-up would find Cleveland not scoring a single point all game. In the first quarter, Bengals RB Rudi Johnson got a 1-yard TD run for the only score of the period. In the second quarter, QB Carson Palmer completed a 7-yard TD pass to WR Chris Henry, while kicker Shayne Graham got a 24-yard field goal for another uncontested 10 points. In the third quarter, Palmer would hook up with WR T. J. Houshmandzadeh on a 6-yard TD pass (along with a failed PAT) for the only score of the period. In the fourth, Palmer and Henry wrapped up the game on a 10-yard TD pass, shutting out the Cleveland Browns on their home field, 30–0. With the second loss in a row at their home stadium, the Browns fell to 3–8.

Braylon Edwards was involved in a highly publicized altercation with Charlie Frye on the sideline during the game, resulting in Edwards issuing a formal apology for his actions.

==== Week 13 vs Kansas City Chiefs ====
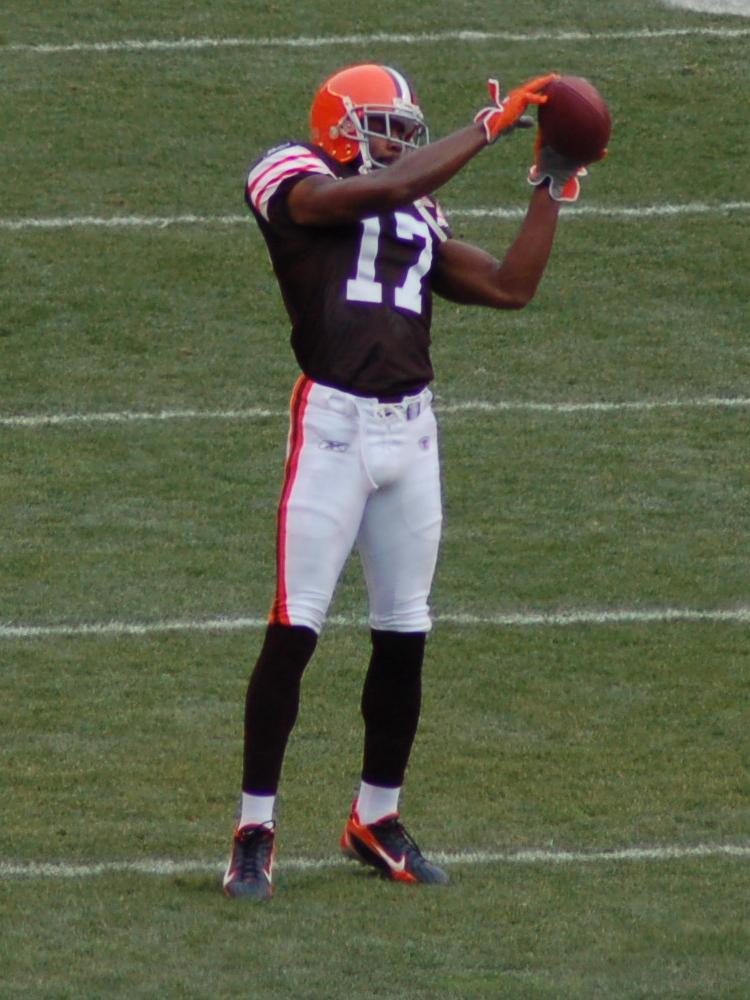
Braylon Edwards warming up on December 3, 2006

	1	2	3	4	OT	Total
Chiefs	0	14	7	7	0	**28**
**Browns**	7	7	0	14	3	**31**

at Cleveland Browns Stadium, Cleveland, Ohio

The Browns came into the game hoping to rebound from the humiliating loss to the Bengals. They came out strong, striking first with a touchdown pass from Frye to Braylon Edwards, and an impressive defensive stop. The Chiefs responded, however, and Trent Green tied the game up 7–7 on a 22-yard pass to Eddie Kennison. They scored again 8 minutes later, this time a 9-yard TD pass to Tony Gonzalez. The Browns fought back, and just before halftime, Droughns ran 1 yard into the endzone, to tie it up at 14 going into halftime. Starting QB Charlie Frye was injured in the first half and, despite attempting a return, came out in the third quarter with a brace on his wrist and no shoulder pads. Derek Anderson took over the game for the Browns.

The second half started out poorly, as Kansas City scored two more touchdowns on passes to Kris Wilson and Tony Gonzalez. The Browns came back to life in the final 9 minutes, with two touchdown passes from Anderson to Steve Heiden, one with 30 seconds left on the clock.

In overtime, the Chiefs won the toss, but the stingy Browns defense forced a punt. A key pass from Anderson to Winslow moved the ball up, and Anderson came back out and ran for a large 33-yard gain, bringing the ball inside the 20-yard line. (It was the longest run from scrimmage for the Browns so far during the season.) Dawson sealed the deal with a 33-yard field goal to win the game.

==== Week 14 at Pittsburgh Steelers ====
	1	2	3	4	Total
Browns	0	0	0	7	**7**
**Steelers**	7	3	14	3	**27**

at Heinz Field, Pittsburgh, Pennsylvania

Coming off a surprising upset over the Chiefs, the Browns flew to Heinz Field for Round 2 of the Rustbelt Rivalry with the Pittsburgh Steelers on Thursday night. In the first quarter, Cleveland trailed as QB Ben Roethlisberger completed a 49-yard TD pass to WR Nate Washington for the only score of the period. In the second quarter, the Browns trailed even further as kicker Jeff Reed nailed a 23-yard field goal for the only score of the period. In the third quarter, Cleveland's ineffectiveness against Pittsburgh continued as Roethlisberger scored a touchdown on a 2-yard QB sneak, while RB Willie Parker got a 3-yard TD run. In the fourth quarter, Reed managed to put the game well out the Browns' reach with a 28-yard field goal. Cleveland would score a touchdown as QB Derek Anderson completed a 45-TD pass to WR Braylon Edwards, yet it would be their only score and their only highlight of the game, as the receiving corps had many dropped passes. With another sweep by the Steelers, the Browns fell to 4–9.

==== Week 15 at Baltimore Ravens ====
	1	2	3	4	Total
Browns	3	7	7	0	**17**
**Ravens**	7	10	7	3	**27**

at M&T Bank Stadium, Baltimore, Maryland

Following their road loss to the Steelers, the Browns flew to M&T Bank Stadium for an AFC North rematch with the Baltimore Ravens. In the first quarter, Cleveland led early with kicker Phil Dawson getting a 51-yard field goal. However, the Ravens took the lead with RB Jamal Lewis getting a 7-yard TD run. In the second quarter, Kyle Boller took over at QB for the Ravens after starting QB Steve McNair went out with a hand injury. Baltimore's lead increased when Boller completed 9-yard TD pass to FB Ovie Mughelli and kicker Matt Stover completed a 38-yard field goal. However, the Browns showed signs of life as QB Derek Anderson completed a 3-yard TD pass to WR Joe Jurevicius. In the third quarter, Cleveland tied the game at 17–17 with Anderson's 14-yard TD pass to WR Braylon Edwards. However, the Ravens took over for the rest of the game with Boller's 77-yard TD pass to WR Demetrius Williams. In the fourth quarter, Baltimore wrapped the game up with Stover's 22-yard field goal. With the loss, the Browns fell 4–10. For the first time in the history of the Cleveland Browns, the team did not win a game in their own division.

==== Week 16 vs Tampa Bay Buccaneers ====
	1	2	3	4	Total
**Buccaneers**	3	3	6	10	**22**
Browns	0	0	0	7	**7**

at Cleveland Browns Stadium, Cleveland, Ohio

Trying to snap a two-game losing skid, the Browns played their final home game of the year in a Week 16 interconference fight with the Tampa Bay Buccaneers. In the first half, Cleveland trailed as Buccaneers' kicker Matt Bryant kicked a 23-yard field goal in the first quarter and a 24-yard field goal in the second quarter. In the third quarter, Tampa Bay continued its pounding with RB Michael Pittman's 11-yard TD run (with the following PAT being blocked). In the fourth quarter, the Buccaneers further increased their lead with OLB Derrick Brooks returning an interception 21 yards for a touchdown. Afterward, the Browns got their only score of the game with CB Daven Holly returning a fumble 40 yards for a touchdown. Then, the Buccaneers wrapped up the game with Bryant kicking a 37-yard field goal. With the loss, Cleveland fell to 4–11.

==== Week 17 at Houston Texans ====
	1	2	3	4	Total
Browns	0	3	0	3	**6**
**Texans**	0	0	14	0	**14**

at Reliant Stadium, Houston, Texas

Trying to end their season on a high note, the Browns flew to Reliant Stadium for the third-straight year to take on the Houston Texans. Charlie Frye convinced Coach Crennel to allow him to start despite having a deep bone bruise in his wrist. After a scoreless first quarter, the Browns struck first with kicker Phil Dawson getting a 43-yard field goal for the only score of the period. However, in the third quarter, Cleveland's ineffectiveness continued to show as Texans RB Chris Taylor got a 5-yard TD run, while DT Anthony Maddox returned a fumble 47 yards for a touchdown. In the fourth quarter, the only thing that the Browns could muster was Dawson's 36-yard field goal. With four-straight losses to end the season, Cleveland ended its season at 4–12. The Browns season ended with 12 players in the Injured Reserve list, many of them starters.

== Standings ==
AFC North
	W	L	T	PCT	DIV	CONF	PF	PA	STK
^{(2)} Baltimore Ravens	13	3	0	.813	5–1	10–2	353	201	W4
Cincinnati Bengals	8	8	0	.500	4–2	6–6	373	331	L3
Pittsburgh Steelers	8	8	0	.500	3–3	5–7	353	315	W1
Cleveland Browns	4	12	0	.250	0–6	3–9	238	356	L4
