= Brodney Pool =

American football player (born 1984)

No. 21, 22
- Position: Safety

Personal information
- Born: May 24, 1984 (age 42); Corpus Christi, Texas, U.S.
- Listed height: 6 ft 2 in (1.88 m)
- Listed weight: 214 lb (97 kg)

Career information
- High school: Westbury (Houston, Texas)
- College: Oklahoma (2002–2004)
- NFL draft: 2005: 2nd round, 34th overall pick

Career history
- Cleveland Browns (2005–2009); New York Jets (2010–2011); Dallas Cowboys (2012)*
- * Offseason or practice squad member only

Awards and highlights
- First-team All-Big 12 (2004); Second-team All-Big 12 (2003)

Career NFL statistics
- Total tackles: 367
- Sacks: 5.5
- Forced fumbles: 3
- Fumble recoveries: 7
- Interceptions: 13
- Defensive touchdowns: 1
- Stats at Pro Football Reference

Brodney Depaul Pool (born May 24, 1984) is an American former professional football player who was a safety in the National Football League (NFL) for the Cleveland Browns and New York Jets. He played college football for the Oklahoma Sooners.

== Early life ==
Pool attended Westbury High School, where he was a five star recruit. As a junior, he had 114 tackles and 4 interceptions. During his senior season, he tallied 75 tackles and 11 interceptions (school record) at free safety. As a running back, he had 40 carries for 159 yards (3.975-yard avg.), 2 rushing touchdowns, 3 receptions for 112 yards (37.3-yard avg.) and 2 receiving touchdowns.

He also lettered in track.

== College career ==
Pool accepted a football scholarship from the University of Oklahoma. In 2002, as a true freshman he appeared in 12 games, playing mainly on special teams and making 11 tackles (7 solo).

As a sophomore, he became a starter at free safety, registering 68 tackles (41 solo), 2 sacks, 6 passes defensed, one forced fumble, one blocked kick and 7 interceptions (fourth in school history).

As a junior, he was on the Thorpe and Nagurski Watchlists, posted 92 tackles (led the team), 65 solo tackles, 9 passes defensed (led the team) and 2 interceptions. He declared for the NFL draft at the end of the season.

He finished his college career with 171 tackles, 9 interceptions, 15 passes defensed, 2 sacks, 2 forced fumbles and one fumble recovery. He was a part of two Big 12 championship teams (2002 and 2004).

== Professional career ==
=== Cleveland Browns ===
Pool was selected by the Cleveland Browns in the second round (34th overall) of the 2005 NFL draft. Although he did not start during his rookie season, he appeared in 13 games mostly as a safety, registering his first interception. He registered 25 tackles, one sack, one interceptions, 7 passes defensed, 10 special teams tackles and 2 fumble recoveries.

In 2006, he lost out the battle for the starting free safety position to Sean Jones, but started 3 games at cornerback due to injuries to Leigh Bodden, Daylon McCutcheon and Gary Baxter. He posted 54 tackles, one interception, 10 passes defensed, one sack, 20 special teams tackles and 2 fumble recoveries.

In 2007, he became the regular starter at free safety, making 72 tackles, 6 passes defensed and 2 interceptions, one of which was returned for a Browns' franchise record 100 yards against the Baltimore Ravens on November 18.

In 2008, he started 15 games after missing the season opener. He recorded 65 tackles, 3 interceptions, 4 passes defensed, one sack, one forced fumble and one fumble recovery.

In 2009, he missed the last 5 games of the regular season after suffering a concussion and being placed on the injured reserve list, but still tied for the team lead with 4 interceptions. He also had 48 tackles, 10 passes defensed, one sack and 2 special teams tackles. He wasn't given a contract offer as a restricted free agent at the end of the year because of his concussion history.

=== New York Jets ===
On March 11, 2010, Pool signed a one-year deal as an unrestricted free agent with the New York Jets valued at $1.3 million. He finished the regular season with 63 tackles, one interception, 9 passes defensed, 2 special teams tackles, one forced fumble and one fumble recovery. He made his first career postseason start and his first career postseason appearance against Indianapolis Colts on Wild Card weekend, making 7 tackles (one for loss), as the Jets won 17–16. On January 23, he recorded his first career postseason interception in the AFC Championship Game against the Pittsburgh Steelers. However, the Jets lost 24–19, falling one game short of the Super Bowl for the second straight season.

On August 3, 2011, he signed a one-year deal with the Jets. He appeared in 14 games (6 starts), posting 37 tackles, a half sack, one interception, 3 passes defensed and 6 special teams tackles. He missed 2 games with a knee injury.

=== Dallas Cowboys ===
On March 15, 2012, Pool signed as a free agent with the Dallas Cowboys, reuniting with former Browns defensive coordinator Rob Ryan. He failed his conditioning test upon arriving at camp, before passing it on his second attempt. On August 6, he was released one week into the start of training camp.

=== NFL statistics ===
Year	Team	GP	COMB	TOTAL	AST	SACK	FF	FR	FR YDS	INT	IR YDS	AVG IR	LNG	TD	PD
2005	CLE	13	35	26	9	1.0	0	1	0	1	1	1	1	0	5
2006	CLE	16	68	55	13	1.0	1	2	0	1	0	0	0	0	8
2007	CLE	16	58	47	11	0.0	0	0	0	2	103	52	100	1	6
2008	CLE	15	65	60	5	1.0	1	1	0	3	45	15	24	0	6
2009	CLE	11	50	39	11	1.0	0	0	0	4	33	8	32	0	10
2010	NYJ	15	53	39	14	1.0	1	1	6	1	0	0	0	0	11
2011	NYJ	14	36	27	9	0.5	0	1	33	1	0	0	0	0	3
Career		100	365	293	72	5.5	3	6	0	13	182	14	100	1	49

== Coaching career ==
On January 16, 2015, Pool accepted a quality control coaching position at Baylor University on the staff of Art Briles.

== Personal life ==
His mother Rose, was the Westbury High School athletic director and an assistant track coach at the University of Texas. He also has two kids, Blaze Pool, and Brooklyn Pool.
