= D'Qwell Jackson =

American football player (born 1983)

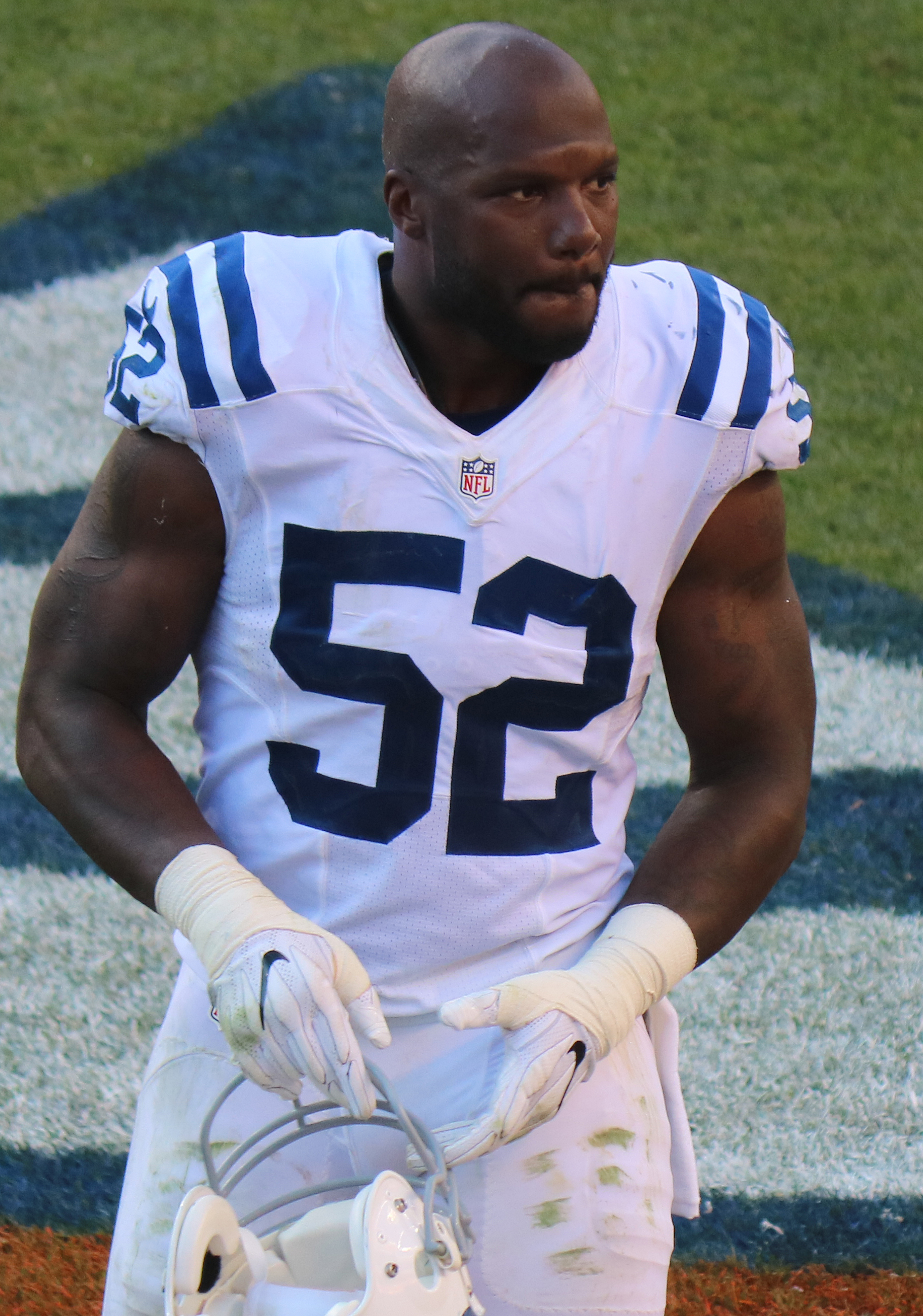
- Jackson with the Indianapolis Colts in 2016

No. 52, 58
- Position: Linebacker

Personal information
- Born: September 26, 1983 (age 43); Largo, Florida, U.S.
- Listed height: 6 ft 0 in (1.83 m)
- Listed weight: 242 lb (110 kg)

Career information
- High school: Seminole (Seminole, Florida)
- College: Maryland (2002–2005)
- NFL draft: 2006: 2nd round, 34th overall pick

Career history
- Cleveland Browns (2006–2013); Indianapolis Colts (2014–2016)

Awards and highlights
- Pro Bowl (2014); NFL solo tackles leader (2011); NFL combined tackles leader (2008); Cleveland Browns Legends; ACC Defensive Player of the Year (2005); 2× First-team All-American (2004, 2005); 2× First-team All-ACC (2004, 2005); Second-team All-ACC (2003)

Career NFL statistics
- Total tackles: 1,190
- Sacks: 18.5
- Forced fumbles: 7
- Fumble recoveries: 12
- Interceptions: 9
- Defensive touchdowns: 3
- Stats at Pro Football Reference

D'Qwell Jackson (/dəˈkwɛl/; born September 26, 1983) is an American former professional football player who was a linebacker for eleven seasons in the National Football League (NFL). He played college football for the Maryland Terrapins, and was selected by the Cleveland Browns in the second round of the 2006 NFL draft. He also played for the Indianapolis Colts.

== Early life ==
Jackson attended Seminole High School in Seminole, Florida, where he was a three-year letterwinner and spent time at linebacker, fullback, quarterback and punter. Jackson made 150 tackles with 16 for loss, four forced fumbles and four fumbles recovered as a junior in 2000, and 91 tackles as a senior, including 10 sacks. He also rushed for 950 yards with a 5.7-yard average and 13 touchdowns as a fullback. Jackson was a first-team all-state selection by the Associated Press as a junior and senior.

Considered a three-star recruit by Rivals.com, Jackson was ranked 57th among outside linebacker prospects in the nation. He chose to attend Maryland over North Carolina State.

== College career ==
D'Qwell is his own guy. He's played far and above my expectations. He's a very good player all the time. He's always precise in practice, always sharp.

— Maryland coach Ralph Friedgen.

In 2002, Jackson saw action in all 14 games and led all freshmen in tackles with 51, including 38 solo stops. As a sophomore, he started all 13 games at middle linebacker and led the team with 136 tackles (90 solo). He also recorded 7.5 tackles for a loss, 2.5 sacks, two interceptions (one returned for a TD), two pass breakups, 10 QB hurries and one forced fumble. Jackson earned second-team All-ACC selection honors that year.

Having established himself as the leader of the Terrapin defense, Jackson started all 11 games in 2004 and led the ACC with 123 tackles. He was named first-team All-America by Collegefootballnews.com and second-team by Rivals.com, also receiving All-American honorable mention by Pro Football Weekly.

Jackson entered his senior year on the preseason "watch list" for the Bednarik, Lombardi, Nagurski and Lott Awards. He became a three-time All-ACC performer after finishing the season with 137 tackles, 6.5 for loss, four sacks, and two interceptions. Jackson was also named ACC Defensive Player of the Year, joining E. J. Henderson as the only Terps to earn this honor.

Jackson became only the seventh player in school history to record over 400 tackles in a career. His 447 tackles rank fourth on Maryland's all-time record list behind linebackers Eric Wilson (481, 1981–84), E. J. Henderson (473, 1999–2002) and Chuck Faucette (466, 1983–86). He also joined Ratcliff Thomas (1993–95) and Henderson (2000–02) as the only Maryland players to lead the team in tackles three consecutive seasons.

== Professional career ==
=== Pre-draft ===
Jackson was the second highest-rated inside linebacker according to SI′s Tony Pauline, but some were scared off by his slow 40-yard dash. Also, at 6 foot and 228 pounds, he was deemed "more suited for a Cover 2 defensive scheme" and considered as a possible weak-side linebacker. NFL draft analyst Mike Mayock projected Jackson to be a late first round pick.

Pre-draft measurables
Height	Weight	Arm length	Hand span	40-yard dash	10-yard split	20-yard split	20-yard shuttle	Three-cone drill	Vertical jump	Broad jump	Bench press	Wonderlic
6 ft 0 1/2 in (1.84 m)	230 lb (104 kg)	30 3/4 in (0.78 m)	9 1/8 in (0.23 m)	4.78 s	1.65 s	2.74 s	4.36 s	7.05 s	37 in (0.94 m)	9 ft 8 in (2.95 m)	19 reps	21
All values from NFL Combine

=== Cleveland Browns ===
The Cleveland Browns selected Jackson in the second round (34th overall) of the 2006 NFL draft. The Browns traded center Jeff Faine and their second round pick (43rd overall) to the New Orleans Saints in exchange for their second round pick (34th overall) that was used to draft Jackson. Jackson was the seventh linebacker drafted in 2006.

On July 23, 2006, the Cleveland Browns signed Jackson to a four-year, $3.69 million contract that included a signing bonus of $1.90 million. He entered training camp slated as a starting inside linebacker. Head coach Romeo Crennel named Jackson and Andra Davis the starting inside linebackers to start the regular season, alongside outside linebackers Kamerion Wimbley and Willie McGinest.

In his rookie season, he started thirteen games at weakside linebacker and finished third on the team in tackles with 93, including 60 solo and three tackles for a loss. Jackson posted a career-high 16 tackles against the Carolina Panthers on October 8, and matched the total against the Cincinnati Bengals on November 26.

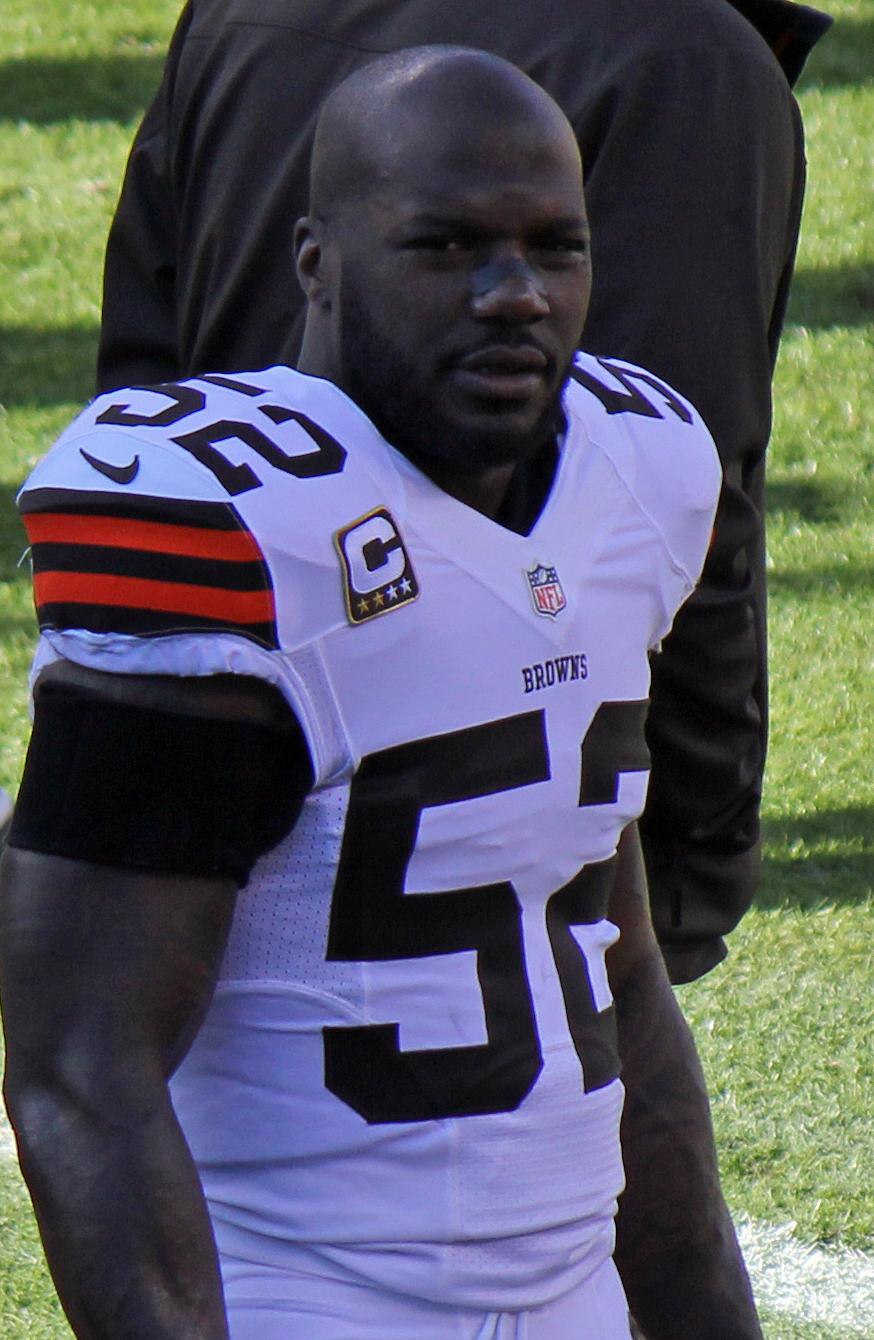
Jackson in 2012.

Playing inside linebacker in his third season with the Browns, Jackson led the NFL in tackles with 154.

Jackson changed his jersey number from No. 58 to No. 52 after it became available in 2008. He had previously worn No. 52 in college, but was unable to wear it during his first two seasons as it was worn by Matt Stewart.

Jackson's 2009 season was cut short after he was injured in the sixth game of the season against Pittsburgh. Jackson had a team high 57 tackles when he hurt his shoulder. Browns coach Eric Mangini said of Jackson at the time, "It’s disappointing any time you lose a player for the season, and this is especially true with someone like D’Qwell, who has proven to be an outstanding leader for us both on and off the field."

On March 5, 2010, the Cleveland Browns extended a one-year restricted free agent tender to Jackson. On June 14, 2010, Jackson signed a one-year, $1.75 million restricted free agent tender to remain with the Browns through 2010.

On March 3, 2011, the Cleveland Browns signed Jackson to a one-year, $4.50 million contract. Jackson finally returned from injury in 2011 after nearly missing two whole seasons in a row and thrived in the Browns new 4–3 defensive alignment. Where the 3–4 restricted Jackson due to his lack of elite size, the 4–3 gave him more space and room to make a play on the ball-carrier. He was ranked 96th by his fellow players on the NFL Top 100 Players of 2012.

On February 26, 2012, the Cleveland Browns signed Jackson to a five-year, $42.50 million contract that included $19 million guaranteed.

On October 26, 2012, Jackson was fined $7,875 for a late hit against the Indianapolis Colts in Week 7.

On February 26, 2014, the Cleveland Browns released Jackson and saved $5.23 million in salary cap space and avoided paying a $4.10 million roster bonus. As an unrestricted free agent he visited multiple teams, including the Indianapolis Colts, Miami Dolphins, Tennessee Titans, and Denver Broncos.

=== Indianapolis Colts ===
Jackson agreed to terms with the Indianapolis Colts on March 6, 2014. He signed a 4-year, $22 million contract, with $11 million guaranteed. He won the AFC Defensive Player of the Week in Week 13 of the 2014 season, when he had 12 tackles, 1 pass defended, 1 fumble recovery, and 1 touchdown against the Washington Redskins. On December 23, Jackson was named as an alternate player for the 2014 Pro Bowl.

Jackson caught an interception thrown by Tom Brady in the AFC Championship Game against the New England Patriots; although they would go on to lose the game 45–7, this catch became notorious following the Deflategate incident.

On February 3, 2015, Jackson was arrested for assault after allegedly punching a pizza delivery man in the head in Washington D.C.

Jackson was suspended four games on December 6, 2016, for violating the NFL policy on performance-enhancing substances.

On February 9, 2017, Jackson was released by the Colts.

== Post-playing career ==
On June 8, 2024, Jackson was announced as a pro scout for the Cleveland Browns.

== Career statistics ==
Season	Team	Games		Tackles						Interceptions					Fumbles			
Season	Team	GP	GS	Comb	Total	Ast	Sck	SFTY	PDef	Int	Yds	Avg	Lng	TDs	FF	FR	Yds	TDs
2006	CLE	13	13	93	60	33	0.0	0	0	–	–	0.0	–	–	0	0	0	0
2007	CLE	14	13	101	75	26	1.0	0	3	1	1	1.0	1	0	0	1	0	0
2008	CLE	16	16	154	95	59	2.0	0	6	3	29	9.7	16	0	0	0	0	0
2009	CLE	6	6	59	46	13	0.0	0	2	–	–	0.0	–	–	1	0	0	0
2010	CLE	Did not play due to injury																
2011	CLE	16	16	158^{†}	116	42	3.5	0	3	1	24	24.0	24	0	1	3	1	0
2012	CLE	16	16	118	63	55	3.5	0	7	2	31	15.5	27T	1	2	2	0	0
2013	CLE	16	16	141	75	66	1.5	0	7	1	0	0.0	0	0	1	1	0	0
2014	IND	16	16	140^{†}	82	58	4.0	0	1	–	–	0.0	–	–	1	4	35	1
2015	IND	16	16	150	89	61	3.0	0	10	1	6	6.0	6T	1	1	0	0	0
2016	IND	12	12	78	52	26	1.0	0	1	0	0	0	0	0	0	0	0	0
	Total	141	140	1,190	752	438	19.5	0	42	9	91	10.1	27	2	7	11	36	1

^† AFC Leader
