= Jereme Perry =

American football player (born 1981)

No. 31, 33
- Position: Cornerback

Personal information
- Born: December 15, 1981 (age 44); Saginaw, Michigan, U.S.
- Listed height: 5 ft 11 in (1.80 m)
- Listed weight: 200 lb (91 kg)

Career information
- College: Eastern Michigan
- NFL draft: 2006: undrafted

Career history
- Cleveland Browns (2006); Miami Dolphins (2007); Cleveland Browns (2008)*
- * Offseason or practice squad member only

Career NFL statistics
- Total tackles: 21
- Fumble recoveries: 1
- Pass deflections: 5
- Stats at Pro Football Reference

Jereme Jovon Perry (born December 15, 1981) is an American former professional football player who was a cornerback in the National Football League (NFL). He played college football for the Eastern Michigan Eagles and was signed by the Cleveland Browns as an undrafted free agent in 2006.

Perry also played for the Miami Dolphins.

== Early life ==
Perry attended Buena Vista High School where he lettered three years in football and four years in track. He earned all-area honors in football his final two seasons. He holds the Buena Vista record for a 97-yard rush from the line of scrimmage. He also holds ranks in the top in career rushing and interceptions.

== College career ==
Perry attended Eastern Michigan University from 2001-2005. He played 32 games for the Eagles and lettered three years in his career. He was named Eastern's Most Improved Back in 2003. He recorded 30 tackles and forced two fumbles in 2004. He missed his sophomore season in 2002 with a ruptured spleen. He started as a "true" freshman in 2001 and earned a letter. He garnered honors from the university such as Special Teams and Defensive Players of the Week.

== Professional career ==
=== First stint with Browns ===
Perry was signed as an undrafted rookie free agent in spring 2006. After being signed to the practice squad in September, he found himself starting in October after the injuries to Browns starters Leigh Bodden and Daven Holly. His accomplishments are not numerous for the Browns. However, in Week 10, he recovered a Michael Vick fumble to seal the Browns' third victory of the season—redemption after being burned on a 55-yard pass from Vick to receiver Roddy White two plays previous.

Despite his strong performance as a rookie, Perry was cut by the Browns on September 8, 2007 - the day before the regular season opener. Because he appeared in more than nine games during his first season, he had no practice squad eligibility remaining.

=== Miami Dolphins ===
On November 7, the Miami Dolphins signed Perry, while placing linebacker Abraham Wright in Injured Reserve. He was one of eight players released by the Dolphins on April 24, 2008.

=== Second stint with Browns ===
On May 14, 2008, the Browns re-signed Perry. He was released Aug. 30, 2008 during the final roster cuts.
