= Todd Grantham =

American football coach (born 1966)

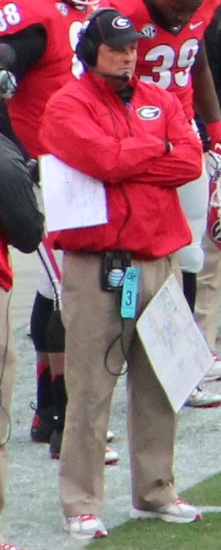
- Grantham with Georgia in 2013

UAB Blazers
- Title: Defensive coordinator

Personal information
- Born: September 13, 1966 (age 60); Pulaski, Virginia, U.S.

Career information
- College: Virginia Tech

Career history
- Virginia Tech (1990–1995); Defensive ends & inside linebackers coach (1990–1991); Defensive tackles coach (1992–1993); Defensive line coach (1994–1995); Michigan State (1996–1998); Defensive line coach (1996–1997); Assistant head coach & defensive line coach (1998); Indianapolis Colts (1999–2001) Defensive line coach; Houston Texans (2002–2004) Defensive line coach; Cleveland Browns (2005–2007) Defensive coordinator; Dallas Cowboys (2008–2009) Defensive line coach; Georgia (2010–2013) Assistant head coach/defensive coordinator & outside linebackers coach; Louisville (2014–2016) Assistant head coach/defensive coordinator & linebackers coach; Mississippi State (2017) Assistant head coach/defensive coordinator & linebackers coach; Florida (2018–2021) Defensive coordinator; Alabama (2022) Defensive analyst; New Orleans Saints (2023–2024) Defensive line coach; Oklahoma State (2025) Defensive coordinator; UAB (2026–present) Defensive coordinator

Jeffrey Todd Grantham (born September 13, 1966) is an American football coach who is the defensive coordinator for UAB. He has previously served as defensive coordinator at the University of Florida and Oklahoma State.

== Early life and education ==
Grantham was born in Pulaski, Virginia, and attended nearby Virginia Tech from 1984 to 1988. He played for Frank Beamer in Beamer's first season as head coach. He graduated from Virginia Tech in 1988 with a Bachelor of Arts in sports management. Grantham earned Second Team All-South Independent, All-American honors his senior year at tackle.

== Coaching career ==
=== Virginia Tech ===
From 1990 to 1995 Grantham worked as a coach at his alma mater.

=== Michigan State ===
Grantham worked as the defensive line coach for Michigan State in 1996 and 1997.

=== Indianapolis Colts ===
After being promoted to assistant head coach at Michigan State, Grantham was hired by Jim Mora in 1998 to coach the defensive line. His D-Line was one of the catalysts of the biggest turnaround in league history (3–13 to 13–3), ultimately helping the Colts defense compile 56 sacks in two years, which was a club record since moving to Indianapolis. During his tenure in Indianapolis, the Colts had a 29–19 record.

=== Houston Texans ===
After Mora was relieved of his duties in Indianapolis, Grantham moved on to the newly formed Houston Texans, joining the staff of former Pittsburgh Steelers defensive coordinator and inaugural Carolina Panthers head coach Dom Capers. Grantham was given much talent to work with from the start, as the Texans acquired Pro Bowl defensive end Gary Walker and nose tackle Seth Payne from the Jacksonville Jaguars in the expansion draft.

In 2002, his influence was evident on the line as starters Gary Walker, Seth Payne, and Jerry DeLoach all posted career highs in tackles. Gary Walker also earned his second Pro Bowl appearance under his tutelage that season.

2003 was a testing year for the line, as Pro Bowler Gary Walker and Seth Payne played a combined six games due to injury. However, Jerry Deloach and Steve Martin filled in with great success, posting a combined 201 tackles. Despite the 5–11 record, there was optimism for the future of the steadily improving defense.

2004 was a break-out year for the Texans. Grantham's line once again made a major contribution, helping the Texans achieve the 13th ranked run defense in the league. Despite the low number of sacks (5.5), they put great pressure on opposing quarterbacks (76 recorded pressures) and helped anchor the defense that was equipped with playmakers such as 2004 1st-round draft pick Dunta Robinson, former Ravens linebacker Jamie Sharper, and veteran defensive backs Aaron Glenn and Marcus Coleman. Despite posting a mediocre 7–9 record, the Texans were poised to start making an impact in the NFL after improving every season since their inception in 2002.

After three strong seasons with the Texans, Grantham accepted an offer from Romeo Crennel to become defensive coordinator of the Browns. After he left, the Houston Texans posted a 2–14 record. Capers was fired after the end of the season.

=== Cleveland Browns ===
Grantham's first year as coordinator of the Browns defense under head coach Romeo Crennel was an eclectic mix of good and bad. They once again fielded one of the NFL's top pass defenses, actually stepping up in rank from 5th to 4th in the NFL. When starting cornerback Gary Baxter went down with a knee injury that ended his career, Leigh Bodden emerged as a solid playmaker. Overall, their secondary continued to play at a high level. They also ranked 11th in scoring defense despite possessing one of the leagues worst run defenses. Orpheus Roye posted a career high with 88 tackles and also made three sacks.

After Michigan State dismissed head coach John L. Smith in 2006, Grantham was one of the candidates to be his replacement. However, Michigan State hired Cincinnati head coach Mark Dantonio.

He was fired on January 11, 2008, after the 2007 season with the Browns defense ranking 25th against the pass, 27th against the run, and 30th in total yards allowed among 32 teams. This proved to be the costly cause of Cleveland losing out on a playoff berth.

=== Dallas Cowboys ===
Grantham served as the defensive line coach for the Dallas Cowboys until the end of the season when he joined the coaching staff at the University of Georgia as defensive coordinator. During Grantham's 2 seasons with Dallas, the Cowboys improved from 13th (2007) to 2nd (2009) in the league in points allowed.

=== Georgia Bulldogs ===
In 2010 Grantham installed a 3–4 defense during his four-year tenure at Georgia. Despite breakdowns in coverage at times, in 2010 the Bulldogs ranked 23rd nationally in total defense and 36th in scoring defense (22.1 points allowed per game). His defense also forced 26 takeaways, over twice as many as Georgia had in 2009 (12), and helped them move from 118th nationally in 2009 to 19th in 2010 in turnover margin.

Georgia's defense under Grantham finished the 2011 season ranked 5th nationally in total defense, 10th in pass defense and 11th in rush defense. They also finished 2nd in the SEC in sacks (34), tackles for loss (94) and turnovers forced (29). In 2012, despite falling to 32nd nationally in total defense, the unit was revered as one of the top in the country as the team finished the season 12–2, winning the Eastern Division of the SEC. Grantham's defense had some of the top talent in the country with playmakers at every position including linebackers Jarvis Jones and Alec Ogletree, defensive linemen John Jenkins and Kwame Geathers, cornerback Sanders Commings, and All-American free safety Bacarri Rambo. Jones was Grantham's star player and was once again a consensus All-American in 2012, finishing the regular season leading the nation in tackles for loss, and 3rd in sacks.

Grantham is perhaps most famous for giving University of Florida kicker, Chas Henry, the "choke" sign as Henry lined up for the winning kick in the 2010 Florida-Georgia game. Grantham also was shown on TV in a confrontation with Vanderbilt coach James Franklin after the 2011 Vandy game. He later acknowledged that his actions embarrassed the university and were "unfortunate". Neither coach apologized to the other.

Under him Georgia defense finished No. 45 in the nation in the 2013–2014 season. It was the lowest the Bulldogs finished during Grantham's four-year tenure.

=== Louisville Cardinals ===
In 2014 Grantham was hired by Bobby Petrino to be his defensive coordinator at the University of Louisville. He was given a five-year guaranteed contract worth $1 million per year.

=== Mississippi State Bulldogs ===
In 2017 Grantham was hired by Dan Mullen to be the defensive coordinator at Mississippi State University. He was given a multi-year deal, with financial details not disclosed. Ironically, Grantham's predecessor at Mississippi State, Peter Sirmon, was hired to be defensive coordinator at the University of Louisville.

=== Florida Gators ===
On November 30, 2017, Mullen officially hired Grantham to be his defensive coordinator at Florida. Grantham had previously served as Mullen's defensive coordinator at Mississippi State during the 2017 season. In his first year at Florida, the Gators finished 28th in total defense nationally and 5th in the SEC. In February 2019, the Cincinnati Bengals zeroed in on Grantham to be their next defensive coordinator. Grantham ultimately rejected the Bengals' offer and decided to stay at Florida. Following his decision, Grantham received a contract extension and pay raise which made him one of the highest paid assistant coaches in college football. On November 7, 2021, Todd Grantham was let go by head coach Dan Mullen following a 40–17 loss to South Carolina.

=== Alabama ===
In February 2022, Grantham agreed to joined Nick Saban's staff at Alabama as a defensive analyst.

=== New Orleans Saints ===
On February 3, 2023, the New Orleans Saints hired Grantham as their defensive line coach.

After extensive internal criticism, Grantham was demoted from defensive line coach to a team advisor in November 2024. Eight-time Pro Bowl defensive lineman Cam Jordan described Grantham as "the worst D-line coach I've ever had."

=== Oklahoma State ===
On December 9, 2024, Oklahoma State hired Grantham to serve as their defensive coordinator.

=== UAB ===
On December 30, 2025, Grantham was hired to serve as the defensive coordinator for the UAB Blazers under head coach Alex Mortensen.
