= Jeff Davidson =

American football player and coach (born 1967)

No. 62
- Position: Guard / Tackle

Personal information
- Born: October 3, 1967 (age 59); Akron, Ohio, U.S.
- Listed height: 6 ft 5 in (1.96 m)
- Listed weight: 309 lb (140 kg)

Career information
- High school: Westerville (OH) North
- College: Ohio State
- NFL draft: 1990: 5th round, 111th overall pick

Career history

Playing
- Denver Broncos (1990–1992); New Orleans Saints (1994)

Coaching
- New Orleans Saints (1995) Volunteer assistant; New Orleans Saints (1996) Offensive assistant; New England Patriots (1997) Tight ends coach; New England Patriots (1998–2001) Assistant offensive line coach; New England Patriots (2002–2004) Tight ends coach & assistant offensive line coach; Cleveland Browns (2005) Offensive line coach; Cleveland Browns (2006) Assistant head coach & offensive coordinator; Carolina Panthers (2007–2010) Offensive coordinator; Minnesota Vikings (2011–2015) Offensive line coach; San Diego Chargers (2016) Offensive line coach; Denver Broncos (2017) Offensive line coach; Detroit Lions (2018–2019) Offensive line coach

Awards and highlights
- 3× Super Bowl champion (XXXVI, XXXVIII, XXXIX); First-team All-Big Ten (1989)

Career NFL statistics
- Games played: 44
- Games started: 30
- Fumble recoveries: 1
- Stats at Pro Football Reference
- Coaching profile at Pro Football Reference

Jeff Davidson (born October 3, 1967) is an American professional football coach and former player in the National Football League (NFL). He was the offensive coordinator of the Carolina Panthers and Cleveland Browns.

== Playing career ==
=== High school ===
Davidson attended Westerville North High School in Westerville, Ohio and was a letterman in football. He was also all state in football as well as all state in track & field in the shot put, where he holds his high school's school record at 60'3."

=== College ===
Davidson attended and played football for the Ohio State Buckeyes from 1986 to 1989. He became a starter at offensive guard as a junior and earned All-Big Ten honors as a senior.

He was also selected as a co-captain as a senior. His father Jim, an All-American tackle, had been Buckeye co-captain in 1964. The Davidsons became the first father-son captain duo in Ohio State history. They were followed by the Herbstreits (1960/1992) and the Johnsons (1984-1985/2007).

=== NFL ===
Davidson was drafted by the Denver Broncos in the fifth round of the 1990 NFL draft. He was with the Broncos for four seasons before signing with the New Orleans Saints in 1994, and retiring after suffering a shoulder injury.

== Coaching career ==
=== New England Patriots ===
After retiring, Davidson stayed with the New Orleans Saints as a volunteer assistant in 1995. He was made an offensive assistant by the Saints in 1996. In 1997, he was hired by the New England Patriots as their tight ends coach. At the end of the season, the Patriots promoted him to assistant offensive line coach, where he remained from 1998-2001. In 2002, he again became the tight ends coach while retaining his assistant offensive line coaching duties.

=== Cleveland Browns ===
When Patriots defensive coordinator Romeo Crennel left to become the Browns' head coach for the 2005 season, Davidson followed Crennel to Cleveland as the Browns' offensive line coach. In 2006, Davidson was named the team's assistant head coach/offensive line coach. After six games of the Browns' season, offensive coordinator Maurice Carthon was fired and Davidson promoted in his place.

=== Carolina Panthers ===
Davidson was hired on January 24, 2007, as the offensive coordinator of the Carolina Panthers. Having worked as a member of the New England Patriots' staff under Charlie Weis, Davidson forged a close relationship with him. Weis is a good friend of former Panthers head coach John Fox, and it is believed that his recommendation was instrumental in Fox's decision to hire Davidson. With his playing and coaching experience at the offensive line and additional coaching with tight ends, most believe this hire meant that Coach Fox wanted to keep his focus on a powerful offense based on a strong running game, as has been his tendency in the past.

=== Minnesota Vikings ===
Head Coach Leslie Frazier announced Davidson would be joining the Vikings as offensive line coach on January 20, 2011.

On January 12, 2016, head coach Mike Zimmer announced that Davidson's contract would not be renewed for the 2016 NFL season.

=== San Diego Chargers ===
On January 14, 2016, the San Diego Chargers announced Jeff Davidson for new offensive line coach.

=== Denver Broncos ===
On January 14, 2017, Davidson was named offensive line coach of the Denver Broncos, joining recently fired San Diego Chargers head coach Mike McCoy on the offensive staff for head coach Vance Joseph.

=== Detroit Lions ===
On February 7, 2018, Davidson was named offensive line coach of the Detroit Lions. On January 2, 2020, Davidson announced he was taking an "indefinite leave" from coaching.
