= 2004 Cleveland Browns season =

56th season in franchise history

- Owner: Randy Lerner
- Head coach: Butch Davis (resigned November 30, 3–8 record); Terry Robiskie (1–4 record) (interim)
- Home stadium: Cleveland Browns Stadium

Results
- Record: 4–12
- Division place: 4th AFC North
- Playoffs: Did not qualify
- Pro Bowlers: None

The 2004 Cleveland Browns season was the team's 56th season and 52nd with the National Football League. The Browns were looking to improve on their 5–11 record from 2003 and return to their 2002 playoff position; however, hindered by a tough schedule they regressed further and only won four games. On November 30, Butch Davis resigned as head coach and general manager of the team. He was succeeded by offensive coordinator Terry Robiskie. Robiskie promoted tight end coach Rob Chudzinski to offensive coordinator.

On September 12, the Browns defeated the Baltimore Ravens, 20–3, marking the team's only Week 1 win since returning to the NFL in 1999 until they defeated the Carolina Panthers in 2022, 26–24. In the 24 seasons since the Browns returned to the league, the Browns opening week record is 3–20–1.

== 2004 NFL draft ==
Draft order		Player name	Position	College
Round	Pick	Player name	Position	College
1	6	Kellen Winslow	Tight end	Miami
2	59	Sean Jones	Safety	Georgia
4	106	Luke McCown	Quarterback	Louisiana Tech
5	161	Amon Gordon	Defensive tackle	Stanford
6	176	Kirk Chambers	Offensive tackle	Stanford
7	208	Adimchinobi Echemandu	Running back	California

== Personnel ==
2004 Cleveland Browns staff
Front office: Owner and chairman – Randy Lerner; President and chief executive officer – John Collins; Director of Pro Personnel - Jeremy Green; Pro Personnel Coordinator - Steve Sabo; Director of college personnel – Phil Neri; Head coaches: Head coach and General Manager – Butch Davis (Resigned after Week 12); Interim Head Coach - Terry Robiskie; Offensive coaches: Offensive coordinator – Terry Robiskie; Interim Offensive coordinator and Tight Ends - Rob Chudzinski; Quarterbacks – Steve Hagen; Running backs – Kennedy Polamalu; Wide receivers – Fred Graves; Offensive line – Larry Zierlein; Assistant offensive line – Mike Sullivan	Defensive coaches: Defensive coordinator – Dave Campo; Defensive line – Andre Patterson; Linebackers – George Edwards; Secondary – Chuck Pagano; Defensive Backs – Todd Bowles; Defensive assistant – Phillip Banko; Special teams coaches: Special teams coordinator – Jerry Rosburg; Strength and conditioning: Head strength and conditioning – Buddy Morris; Assistant strength and conditioning – Tom Myslinski; Assistant strength and conditioning - Rob Phillips

== Roster ==
2004 Cleveland Browns roster
Quarterbacks (QB): 15 Josh Harris; 10 Kelly Holcomb; 12 Luke McCown; Running backs (RB): 23 Adimchinobe Echemandu; 31 William Green; 42 Terrelle Smith FB; 44 Lee Suggs; Wide receivers (WR): 89 Richard Alston; 81 Antonio Bryant; 19 Frisman Jackson; 84 Andre King; 86 Dennis Northcutt; Tight ends (TE): 82 Steve Heiden; 49 Keith Heinrich; 83 Aaron Shea	Offensive linemen (OL): 65 Kirk Chambers OT; 75 Javiar Collins OT; 71 Damion Cook G; 70 Enoch DeMar G; 67 Melvin Fowler C; 73 Joaquin Gonzalez G; 62 Craig Osika C; 77 Ross Verba OT; 66 Paul Zukauskas G; Defensive linemen (DL): 74 Nick Eason DT; 98 Ebenezer Ekuban DE; 94 Amon Gordon DT; 90 Corey Jackson DE; 96 Kenard Lang DE; 97 Alvin McKinley DT; 93 Michael Myers DE/DT; 78 Tyrone Rogers DE; 99 Orpheus Roye DT; 61 Gerard Warren DT	Linebackers (LB): 59 Kevin Bentley OLB; 48 Sherrod Coates OLB; 55 Barry Gardner MLB; 57 Warrick Holdman OLB; 51 Chaun Thompson OLB; 53 Mason Unck MLB; 56 Eric Westmoreland OLB; Defensive backs (DB): 35 Dyshod Carter CB; 25 Chris Crocker FS; 24 Robert Griffith SS; 37 Anthony Henry CB; 22 Michael Jameson SS; 39 Michael Lehan CB; 20 Earl Little FS; 33 Daylon McCutcheon CB; 34 Lewis Sanders CB; Special teams (ST): 4 Phil Dawson K; 8 Derrick Frost P; 64 Ryan Pontbriand LS	Practice squad: 91 Felipe Claybrooks DE; 79 Lewis Dawson OT; -- Brandon Haw S; 85 C. J. Jones WR; -- Sultan McCullough RB; 36 Corey McIntyre FB; -- Deryck Toles LB; -- Keith Willis TE; Reserve: -- Jason Andersen C (IR); 28 Leigh Bodden CB (IR); 52 Brant Boyer OLB (IR); 92 Courtney Brown DE (IR); 54 Andra Davis MLB (IR); 87 André Davis WR (IR); 50 Jeff Faine C (IR); 5 Jeff Garcia QB (IR); 63 Kelvin Garmon G (IR); 29 Michael Grant S (IR); 68 Sterling Harris OT (IR); 26 Sean Jones S (PUP); 40 Ben Miller RB (IR); 88 Chad Mustard TE (IR); 58 Ben Taylor LB (IR); 72 Ryan Tucker OT (IR); 80 Kellen Winslow II TE (IR); Rookies in italics 53 active, 17 reserve, 8 practice squad

== Schedule ==
Football statistics site Football Outsiders calculated that the 2004 Browns played the toughest schedule of any NFL team between 1989 and 2013, based on strength of opponent, although Pro Football Reference argues that their schedule was only the fifth-toughest in this span and twelfth-toughest non-strike since 1971. (Note: Tougher schedules according to Pro Football Reference in non-strike seasons since 1971 were suffered by, in descending order of toughness, the 2010 Buffalo Bills, the 1975 Browns and 1975 Jets (equal), the 2009 Tampa Bay Buccaneers, the 2010 Miami Dolphins, the 1979 Cincinnati Bengals, the 1977 Kansas City Chiefs, the 1973 San Francisco 49ers, and lastly by the 1991 Phoenix Cardinals and 2015 San Francisco 49ers (equal).) The Browns played just one game – their Week 16 contest against the Miami Dolphins – against a team with fewer than six wins, and played five against opponents with 12 or more wins, including a total of three against Steelers and Patriots who were a combined 28–2 against their remaining opponents.

Apart from their AFC North division games, the Browns played against the AFC East and NFC East according to the conference rotation, and played the Chargers and Texans based on 2003 divisional positions.

Week	Date	Opponent	Result	Record	Stadium	Attendance
1	September 12	**Baltimore Ravens**	**W** 20–3	1–0	Cleveland Browns Stadium	73,068
2	September 19	at Dallas Cowboys	**L** 12–19	1–1	Texas Stadium	63,119
3	September 26	at New York Giants	**L** 10–27	1–2	Giants Stadium	78,521
4	October 3	Washington Redskins	**W** 17–13	2–2	Cleveland Browns Stadium	73,348
5	October 10	at **Pittsburgh Steelers**	**L** 23–34	2–3	Heinz Field	63,609
6	October 17	**Cincinnati Bengals**	**W** 34–17	3–3	Cleveland Browns Stadium	73,263
7	October 24	Philadelphia Eagles	**L** 31–34 _{(OT)}	3–4	Cleveland Browns Stadium	73,394
8	Bye					
9	November 7	at **Baltimore Ravens**	**L** 13–27	3–5	M&T Bank Stadium	69,781
10	November 14	**Pittsburgh Steelers**	**L** 10–24	3–6	Cleveland Browns Stadium	73,703
11	November 21	New York Jets	**L** 7–10	3–7	Cleveland Browns Stadium	72,547
12	November 28	at **Cincinnati Bengals**	**L** 48–58	3–8	Paul Brown Stadium	65,677
13	December 5	New England Patriots	**L** 15–42	3–9	Cleveland Browns Stadium	73,028
14	December 12	at Buffalo Bills	**L** 7–37	3–10	Ralph Wilson Stadium	72,330
15	December 19	San Diego Chargers	**L** 0–21	3–11	Cleveland Browns Stadium	72,489
16	December 26	at Miami Dolphins	**L** 7–10	3–12	Pro Player Stadium	73,169
17	January 2	at Houston Texans	**W** 22–14	4–12	Reliant Stadium	70,724
Note: Intra-divisional opponents are in **bold** text.

== Standings ==
AFC North
	W	L	T	PCT	DIV	CONF	PF	PA	STK
^{(1)} Pittsburgh Steelers	15	1	0	.938	5–1	11–1	372	251	W14
Baltimore Ravens	9	7	0	.563	3–3	6–6	317	268	W1
Cincinnati Bengals	8	8	0	.500	2–4	4–8	374	372	W2
Cleveland Browns	4	12	0	.250	2–4	3–9	276	390	W1

=== Conference standings ===
AFC
#	Team	Division	W	L	T	PCT	DIV	CONF	SOS	SOV	STK
Division leaders
1	Pittsburgh Steelers	North	15	1	0	.938	5–1	11–1	.484	.479	W14
2	New England Patriots	East	14	2	0	.875	5–1	10–2	.492	.478	W2
3 (Note: Indianapolis clinched the AFC #3 seed instead of San Diego based upon head-to-head victory.)	Indianapolis Colts	South	12	4	0	.750	5–1	8–4	.500	.458	L1
4	San Diego Chargers	West	12	4	0	.750	5–1	9–3	.477	.411	W1
Wild cards
5 (Note: New York Jets clinched the AFC #5 seed instead of Denver based upon better record against common opponents (New York Jets were 5–0 to Denver’s 3–2 against San Diego, Cincinnati, Houston, and Miami).)	New York Jets	East	10	6	0	.625	3–3	7–5	.523	.406	L2
6	Denver Broncos	West	10	6	0	.625	3–3	7–5	.484	.450	W2
Did not qualify for the postseason
7 (Note: Jacksonville and Baltimore finished ahead of Buffalo because they each defeated Buffalo head-to-head.) (Note: Jacksonville finished ahead of Baltimore based upon better record against common opponents (Jacksonville were 3–2 against Baltimore’s 2–3 versus Pittsburgh, Indianapolis, Buffalo and Kansas City).)	Jacksonville Jaguars	South	9	7	0	.563	2–4	6–6	.527	.479	W1
8	Baltimore Ravens	North	9	7	0	.563	3–3	6–6	.551	.472	W1
9	Buffalo Bills	East	9	7	0	.563	3–3	5–7	.512	.382	L1
10	Cincinnati Bengals	North	8	8	0	.500	2–4	4–8	.543	.453	W2
11 (Note: Houston finished ahead of Kansas City based upon head-to-head victory.)	Houston Texans	South	7	9	0	.438	4–2	6–6	.504	.402	L1
12	Kansas City Chiefs	West	7	9	0	.438	3–3	6–6	.551	.509	L1
13 (Note: Oakland finished ahead of Tennessee based upon head-to-head victory.)	Oakland Raiders	West	5	11	0	.313	1–5	3–9	.570	.450	L2
14	Tennessee Titans	South	5	11	0	.313	1–5	3–9	.512	.463	W1
15 (Note: Miami finished ahead of Cleveland based upon head-to-head victory.)	Miami Dolphins	East	4	12	0	.250	1–5	2–10	.555	.438	L1
16	Cleveland Browns	North	4	12	0	.250	1–5	3–9	.590	.469	W1
Tiebreakers (Note: When breaking ties for three or more teams under the NFL's rules, they are first broken within divisions, then comparing only the highest-ranked remaining team from each division.)
