= Randy Melvin =

American gridiron football player and coach (born 1959)

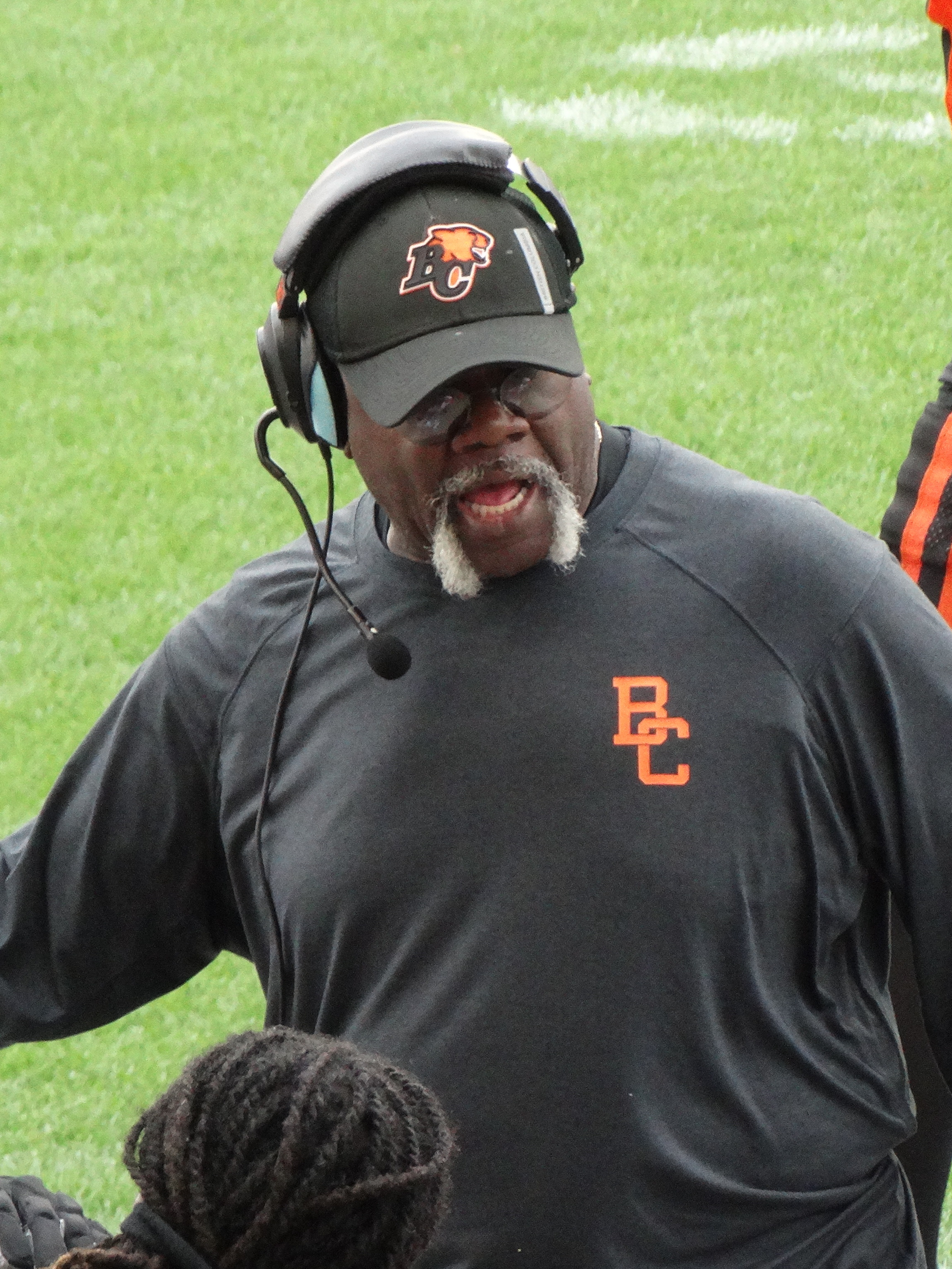
- Melvin with the BC Lions in 2025

BC Lions
- Title: Defensive line coach

Personal information
- Born: April 3, 1959 (age 67); Aurora, Illinois, U.S.

Career information
- College: Eastern Illinois (1978–1981)

Career history
- Urbana HS (OH) (1982) Assistant; West Aurora HS (IL) (1983–1984) Assistant; West Aurora HS (IL) (1985–1987) Defensive line coach; Eastern Illinois (1988–1994) Defensive line coach; Wyoming (1995-1996) Defensive tackle coach; Purdue (1997–1999) Defensive end coach; New England Patriots (2000–2001) Defensive line coach; Rutgers (2002–2004) Defensive line coach; Cleveland Browns (2005–2008) Defensive line coach; Temple (2009) Defensive line coach; Rutgers (2010) Defensive line coach; BC Lions (2011) Defensive line coach; Tampa Bay Buccaneers (2012–2013) Defensive line coach; FIU (2014) Defensive line coach; Miami (FL) (2015) Defensive line coach; Purdue (2016) Defensive line coach; Clearwater HS (FL) (2017) Assistant; BC Lions (2018) Defensive line coach; Hamilton Tiger-Cats (2019–2023) Defensive line coach; BC Lions (2025–present) Defensive line coach

Awards and highlights
- Super Bowl champion (XXXVI); Grey Cup champion (2011)

Randy Melvin (born April 3, 1959) is an American gridiron football coach who is the defensive line coach for the BC Lions of the Canadian Football League (CFL).

== Playing career ==
=== High school ===
Melvin attended Aurora West High School in Aurora, Illinois and was inducted into their Hall of Fame in 1994.

=== College ===
Melvin attended Eastern Illinois University, where he played football as a defensive lineman from 1978 to 1981. He earned his Master's degree from the school in 1993 and was inducted into their Hall of Fame in 1995.

== Coaching career ==
=== High school ===
Melvin began his coaching career at Urbana High School an assistant coach in 1982. He then returned to his alma mater Aurora West High School as an assistant coach from 1983 to 1984 before being named their head coach for 1985, a position he held through 1987.

Melvin returned to the high school level for the 2017 season as an assistant coach for Clearwater High School.

=== College ===
In 1988, Melvin entered the college coaching ranks at his alma mater Eastern Illinois University as their defensive line coach. After seven seasons with Eastern Illinois, he left for the University of Wyoming to be their defensive tackles coach for the 1995 and 1996 seasons. From 1997 through 1999, Melvin served as Purdue University's defensive ends coach. He returned to college coaching in 2002 as the defensive line coach at Rutgers University. After three seasons with the team, he returned to the professional ranks.

=== New England Patriots ===
For their 1995 training camp, Melvin worked with the Denver Broncos as part of the NFL's minority coaching fellowship program. He participated in this program for the next two years as well with the New York Jets, the second of which, 1997, was spent while Bill Belichick was the Jets' assistant head coach. When Belichick left the Jets in 2000 to serve as the New England Patriots' head coach, Melvin was hired as Belichick's defensive line coach. In his second and final season with the team in 2001, Melvin earned his first Super Bowl ring by winning Super Bowl XXXVI.

=== Cleveland Browns ===
After Melvin's former defensive coordinator with the Patriots Romeo Crennel was hired as the Browns' head coach in 2005, Melvin rejoined the NFL coaching ranks as the Browns' defensive line coach for 4 seasons.

=== Return to college ===
After the Browns' 4-12 2008 season both General Manager Phil Savage and head coach Romeo Crennel were fired. Melvin returned to the college ranks to coach the Temple Owls' defensive line for the 2009 season. After a successful season at Temple which saw the Owls reach a bowl for the first time since 1979, Melvin rejoined Greg Schiano at Rutgers University for the 2010 season as defensive line coach.

=== Tampa Bay Buccaneers ===
Melvin was the Tampa Bay Buccaneers defensive line coach from 2012 to 2013.

==== BC Lions ====
On June 1, 2011, it was announced that Melvin had accepted the position of defensive line coach with the BC Lions of the Canadian Football League. The BC Lions won the Grey Cup and Melvin earned another championship.

=== Return to college ===
Melvin was the defensive line coach at Florida International University for the 2014 season. He rejoined Al Golden as the defensive line coach at the University of Miami for the 2015 season. On December 31, 2015, Melvin returned to Purdue University as the defensive line coach for Darrell Hazell.

=== BC Lions (II) ===
Melvin returned to the BC Lions for the 2018 season as the defensive line coach where he coached for one season.

=== Hamilton Tiger-Cats ===
The Hamilton Tiger-Cats hired Melvin as the defensive line coach for the 2019 season. The team won the Eastern Division Final but lost in the 107th Grey Cup again the Winnipeg Blue Bombers. He coached with the Tiger-Cats for four seasons, but was not retained in 2024.

=== BC Lions (III) ===
On January 2, 2025, Melvin returned to the BC Lions as the defensive line coach.
