= Leigh Bodden =

American football player (born 1981)

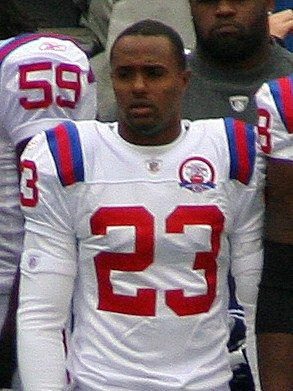
- Bodden with the New England Patriots in 2009

No. 28, 23
- Position: Cornerback

Personal information
- Born: September 24, 1981 (age 45); Hyattsville, Maryland, U.S.
- Listed height: 6 ft 1 in (1.85 m)
- Listed weight: 193 lb (88 kg)

Career information
- High school: Northwestern (Hyattsville)
- College: Duquesne
- NFL draft: 2003: undrafted

Career history
- Cleveland Browns (2003–2007); Detroit Lions (2008); New England Patriots (2009–2011)

Career NFL statistics
- Total tackles: 367
- Forced fumbles: 7
- Fumble recoveries: 7
- Pass deflections: 83
- Interceptions: 18
- Defensive touchdowns: 1
- Stats at Pro Football Reference

Leigh Edmond Bodden (born September 24, 1981) is an American former professional football player who was a cornerback in the National Football League (NFL). He was originally signed by the Cleveland Browns as an undrafted free agent in 2003. He played college football for the Duquesne Dukes. Bodden also played for the Detroit Lions and the New England Patriots.

== Early life ==
Bodden was born in Hyattsville, Maryland. He attended Northwestern High School in Hyattsville. In 1998, his final season with the Wildcats, Bodden helped lead his school to a 10–2 record.

== College career ==
The holder of nearly every Duquesne University interception record, Bodden picked off seven passes in his senior season, 2002, under head coach Greg Gattuso, including a school record-tying three interceptions versus Iona College. Duquesne's defense was ranked number one in all of NCAA Division I-AA in 2002 in total and scoring defense and second in pass and pass efficiency defense. He was the Atlantic 10 Conference long jump champion in 2002.

In his final season with Duquesne, Bodden was an American Football Coaches Association (AFCA) Division I-AA All-American and the 2002 Metro Atlantic Athletic Conference Football League Defensive Player of the Year. He also was a consensus All-American as a junior. He had 28 interceptions during his time at Duquesne, second in the nation during that period.

== Professional career ==
=== Cleveland Browns ===
Despite his strong collegiate career, Bodden received little press and went undrafted in 2003. However, Bodden made the 53-man roster of the Cleveland Browns out of training camp in 2003 and contributed heavily as a special teams player and nickel cornerback, playing in 13 games in his rookie year. He recorded his first career NFL interception against the Arizona Cardinals off a fourth-quarter pass by Josh McCown.

The 2004 season saw Bodden further establish himself as a force on special teams. He tied for the team lead with 18 special tackles and recorded his first career forced fumble. Bodden's season ended in the third quarter of a Week 8 match-up against AFC North rival Baltimore Ravens. He suffered a left shoulder strain and was later placed on injured reserve for the remainder of the season due to a biceps injury.

In 2005, Bodden had a breakthrough season. He gained one of the starting cornerback positions under new head coach Romeo Crennel after an injury to Gary Baxter. Despite missing Weeks 2 and 3 with an injury, then Weeks 4–6 as inactive, he became a favorite of defensive coordinator Todd Grantham and secondary coach Mel Tucker. In a Week 1 loss to the Cincinnati Bengals, he totaled seven tackles, a forced fumble, and his second career interception. He contributed in defensive efforts against Houston (ten tackles and one interception in a 19–16 loss), Miami (five tackles in a 22–0 win), and Oakland (six tackles and one interception in a 9–7 win). In Week 17, Bodden forced a fumble, caught an interception, and tallied five tackles. His contributions helped the Browns to a 20–16 win over the Ravens. As a result of his solid performance in 2005, Bodden received a four-year contract extension. Bodden spent most of the 2006 season battling injuries and only played in nine games, with two interceptions.

On September 5, 2007, Bodden was arrested following an incident outside Cleveland Hopkins International Airport, where he was picking up his girlfriend and their children. Bodden backed his 2004 GMC Yukon SUV into a parking spot in the airport's arrivals area. Cleveland police reported that Bodden failed to comply when asked to pull his vehicle over. When asked a second time by police, he reportedly did comply, but pulled his SUV into an illegal parking zone and left it there. Officers alleged that Bodden was verbally abusive when asked for his driver's license. Bodden was released from jail after posting $1,000 bond and entered not guilty pleas to charges of resisting arrest, failing to comply with an officer and a traffic offense. Bodden apologized for the incident on September 6, and did not face a team or league-imposed suspension for conduct.

Despite the incident, Bodden returned to start all 16 games in 2007. On December 23, Bodden recorded two interceptions in a Browns loss against the Cincinnati Bengals. His six interceptions on the season were a career high, as were his 88 tackles.

=== Detroit Lions ===
On February 29, 2008, Bodden was traded to the Detroit Lions along with a third round draft choice in a deal for defensive tackle Shaun Rogers. Bodden started all 16 games for the 0-16 Lions in 2008, recording 73 tackles and an interception. Bodden was released by the Lions on February 9, 2009.

=== New England Patriots ===
Bodden signed a one-year contract with the New England Patriots on March 11, 2009. He started 14 of the 15 games he played for the Patriots in 2009. In a Week 11 matchup against the New York Jets, Bodden intercepted rookie Jets quarterback Mark Sanchez three times, returning one for a 56-yard score and tying a team high. He finished the season with a team-high five interceptions, along with 55 tackles, 18 passes defended, and one forced fumble.

The Patriots and Bodden were unable to reach an agreement on a contract extension prior to the start of free agency in March 2010. After visiting with the Houston Texans on March 8, 2010, Bodden was reported to have signed a deal with the Patriots the very next day. The following day, details of the contract were released: the total value of the deal was $22 million over 4 years, with $10 million guaranteed. The contract was front-loaded, with nearly two-thirds ($14 million) of the net value coming in the first two years.

Bodden was placed on injured reserve by the Patriots on August 31, 2010, with a shoulder injury. He missed all of the 2010 NFL season. Bodden was released on October 28, 2011, and retired from playing football.

== NFL career statistics ==
Legend
**Bold**	Career high

=== Regular season ===
Year	Team	Games		Tackles					Interceptions					Fumbles			
Year	Team	GP	GS	Cmb	Solo	Ast	Sck	TFL	Int	Yds	TD	Lng	PD	FF	FR	Yds	TD
2003	CLE	13	1	17	17	0	0.0	0	1	1	0	1	3	0	0	0	0
2004	CLE	8	1	27	25	2	0.0	0	0	0	0	0	0	1	0	0	0
2005	CLE	13	11	58	47	11	0.0	**3**	3	6	0	6	17	2	0	0	0
2006	CLE	9	9	31	27	4	0.0	0	2	48	0	35	13	1	0	0	0
2007	CLE	**16**	**16**	**88**	**76**	**12**	0.0	0	**6**	**75**	0	26	15	0	**3**	0	0
2008	DET	**16**	15	73	61	**12**	0.0	0	1	2	0	2	12	**3**	2	**8**	0
2009	NWE	15	14	56	48	8	0.0	1	5	60	**1**	**53**	**19**	0	2	0	0
2011	NWE	5	1	17	13	4	0.0	0	0	0	0	0	4	0	0	0	0
		95	68	367	314	53	0.0	4	18	192	1	53	83	7	7	8	0

=== Playoffs ===
Year	Team	Games		Tackles					Interceptions					Fumbles			
Year	Team	GP	GS	Cmb	Solo	Ast	Sck	TFL	Int	Yds	TD	Lng	PD	FF	FR	Yds	TD
2009	NWE	**1**	**1**	**4**	**3**	**1**	0.0	0	0	0	0	0	**1**	0	0	0	0
		1	1	4	3	1	0.0	0	0	0	0	0	1	0	0	0	0

== Political career ==
In 2022, Bodden ran to be the Prince George's County Executive, losing in the Democratic primary to incumbent Angela Alsobrooks. Bodden was also arrested that same year for trespassing in a Prince George’s County gym when he refused to leave.
