= Steve Heiden =

American football player and coach (born 1976)

New York Jets
- Title: Offensive line coach

Personal information
- Born: September 21, 1976 (age 50); Rushford, Minnesota, U.S.
- Listed height: 6 ft 5 in (1.96 m)
- Listed weight: 270 lb (122 kg)

Career information
- Position: Tight end (No. 83, 82)
- High school: Rushford (MN) Peterson
- College: South Dakota State
- NFL draft: 1999: 3rd round, 69th overall pick

Career history

Playing
- San Diego Chargers (1999–2001); Cleveland Browns (2002–2009)

Coaching
- Arizona Cardinals (2013–2017) Assistant special teams & assistant tight ends coach; Arizona Cardinals (2018) Assistant offensive line coach; Arizona Cardinals (2019–2022) Tight ends coach; Detroit Lions (2023–2024) Tight ends coach; New York Jets (2025–present) Offensive line coach

Career NFL statistics
- Receptions: 201
- Receiving yards: 1,689
- Receiving touchdowns: 14
- Stats at Pro Football Reference

Steve Allen Heiden (born September 21, 1976) is an American football coach and former player who currently serves as the offensive line coach for the New York Jets of the National Football League (NFL).

== Playing career ==
=== College ===
Heiden played college football for South Dakota State University and totaled 112 receptions for 1,499 yards (13.4 avg.) and 8 touchdowns. He majored in early childhood education at South Dakota State University.

=== National Football League ===
Pre-draft measurables
Height	Weight	40-yard dash	10-yard split	20-yard split	20-yard shuttle	Vertical jump	Broad jump	Bench press
6 ft 5 in (1.96 m)	260 lb (118 kg)	4.84 s	1.59 s	2.75 s	4.11 s	32.0 in (0.81 m)	10 ft 1 in (3.07 m)	26 reps
All values from NFL Combine

==== San Diego Chargers ====
Heiden was selected by the San Diego Chargers in the third round (69th overall) in the 1999 NFL draft. In his rookie year, he made 11 appearances for the Chargers and made his NFL debut versus the Seattle Seahawks on October 17.

In his second season with the Chargers, he made 15 appearances with three starts. He also caught his first NFL touchdown in a game versus the Carolina Panthers on December 17.

For the first time in his professional career, Heiden appeared in all 16 regular season and made ten starts.

==== Cleveland Browns ====
On August 31, 2002, San Diego traded Heiden to the Cleveland Browns. He again appeared in all 16 regular season games and made his Browns debut versus the Kansas City Chiefs on September 8.

In 2003, despite missing the final seven league games because of an ankle injury, Heiden had a career-high season with 18 receptions for 134 yards.

2004 was an excellent season for Heiden with 28 receptions for 287 yards and five touchdowns. His three touchdowns in the game at the Cincinnati Bengals on November 28 were a career-high.

The following season in 2005 was equally as productive for Heiden, who surpassed his previous season's catch and yardage totals. He made 43 receptions for 401 yards and three touchdowns.

In 2006, he made 16 appearances with six starts. His numbers for the season were good with 36 receptions for 244 yards and two touchdowns. On April 14, 2007, Heiden was signed to a four-year contract extension by the Browns. On November 18, 2009, the Browns placed Heiden on injured reserve with an ankle injury after the Monday Night Football game.

Besides kicker Phil Dawson, Heiden had played for the Browns longer than any other player on the team.

On March 12, 2010, Heiden was released by the Browns. In June 2011 he retired due to neck spurs. He did not want to retire, but felt his life was at risk.

== Career Statistics ==
Legend
**Bold**	Career high

=== Regular season ===
Year	Team	Games		Receiving					Rushing					Fumbles	
Year	Team	GP	GS	Rec	Yds	Avg	Lng	TD	Att	Yds	Avg	Lng	TD	Fum	Lost
1999	SD	11	0	0	0	—	—	0	—	—	—	—	—	0	0
2000	SD	15	3	6	32	5.3	10	1	—	—	—	—	—	0	0
2001	SD	**16**	10	8	55	6.9	16	1	—	—	—	—	—	0	0
2002	CLE	**16**	6	17	105	6.2	12	1	—	—	—	—	—	0	0
2003	CLE	9	9	18	134	7.4	17	0	—	—	—	—	—	0	0
2004	CLE	13	**13**	28	287	10.3	30	**5**	—	—	—	—	—	1	1
2005	CLE	15	**13**	**43**	**401**	9.3	**62**	3	—	—	—	—	—	0	0
2006	CLE	**16**	6	36	249	6.9	13	2	—	—	—	—	—	0	0
2007	CLE	**16**	6	12	104	8.7	27	0	—	—	—	—	—	0	0
2008	CLE	14	11	23	249	10.8	51	0	—	—	—	—	—	0	0
2009	CLE	7	6	10	73	7.3	14	1	—	—	—	—	—	1	1
Career		148	83	201	1,689	8.4	62	14	0	0	—	—	0	2	2

=== Postseason ===
Year	Team	Games		Receiving					Rushing					Fumbles	
Year	Team	GP	GS	Rec	Yds	Avg	Lng	TD	Att	Yds	Avg	Lng	TD	Fum	Lost
2002	CLE	1	0	0	0	—	—	0	0	0	—	—	0	0	0
Career		1	0	0	0	—	—	0	0	0	—	—	0	0	0

== Coaching career ==
=== Arizona Cardinals ===
On February 5, 2013, Heiden was hired by the Arizona Cardinals as their assistant special teams and assistant tight ends coach. In 2018, he was named assistant offensive line coach. In 2019 he became the team's tight ends coach and served in that position until the end of the 2022 season.

=== Detroit Lions ===
On February 2, 2023, Heiden was hired by the Detroit Lions as their tight ends coach.

=== New York Jets ===
On January 29, 2025, Heiden was hired by the New York Jets to serve as their offensive line coach.
