= Andra Davis =

American football player (born 1978)

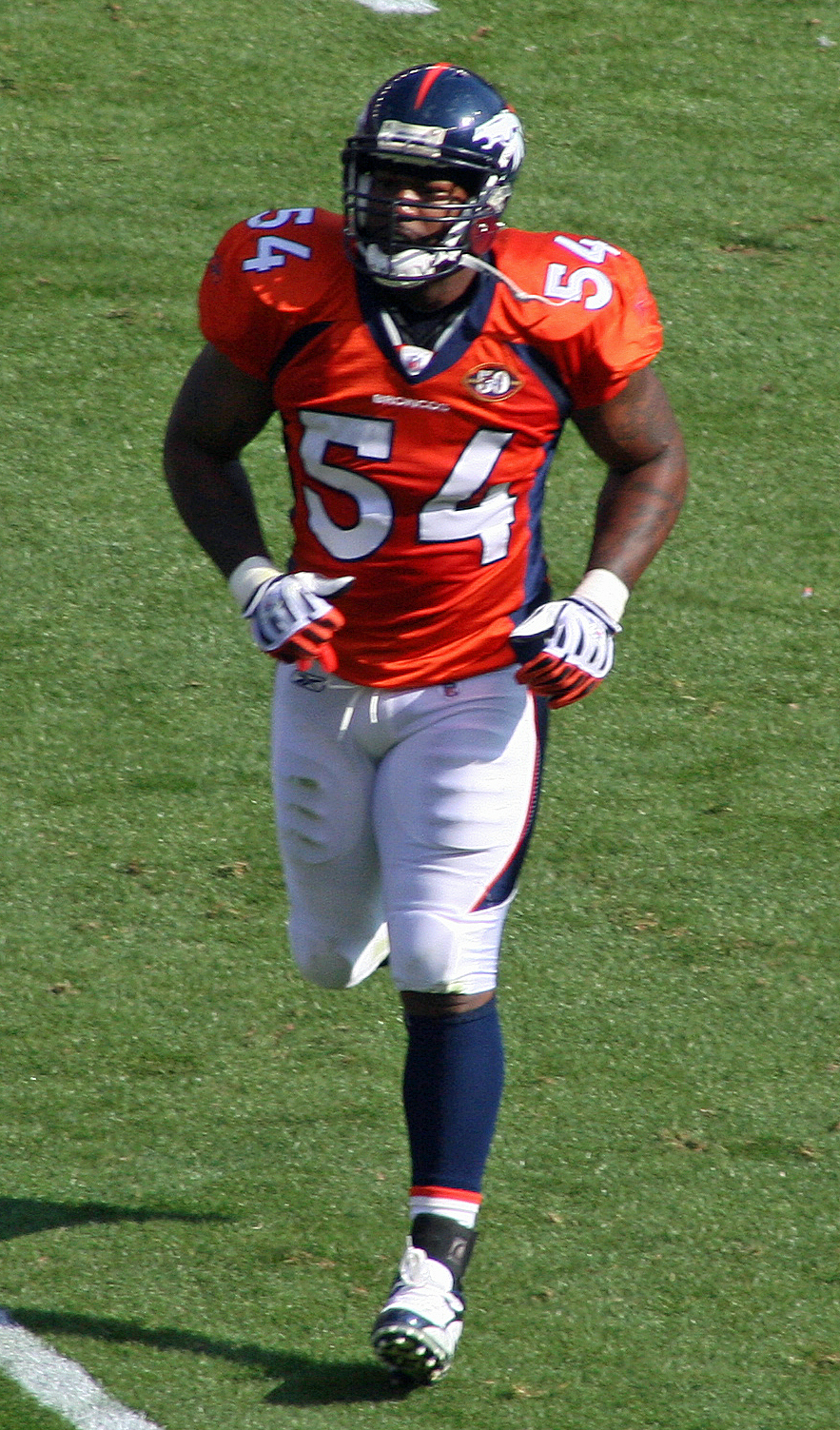
- Davis with the Denver Broncos in 2009

No. 54
- Position: Linebacker

Personal information
- Born: December 23, 1978 (age 47); Live Oak, Florida, U.S.
- Listed height: 6 ft 1 in (1.85 m)
- Listed weight: 255 lb (116 kg)

Career information
- High school: Suwannee (Live Oak)
- College: Florida
- NFL draft: 2002: 5th round, 141st overall pick

Career history
- Cleveland Browns (2002–2008); Denver Broncos (2009); Buffalo Bills (2010–2011)

Awards and highlights
- First-team All-American (2001); First-team All-SEC (2001)

Career NFL statistics
- Total tackles: 787
- Sacks: 12
- Forced fumbles: 5
- Fumble recoveries: 2
- Pass deflections: 33
- Interceptions: 9
- Stats at Pro Football Reference

Andra Raynard Davis [pronounced André] (born December 23, 1978) is an American former professional football player who was a linebacker for 10 seasons in the National Football League (NFL). He played college football for the Florida Gators and was selected by the Cleveland Browns in the fifth round of the 2002 NFL draft. He also played for the Denver Broncos and Buffalo Bills.

== Early life ==
Davis was born in Live Oak, Florida in 1978. He attended Suwannee High School in Live Oak, where he was a four-year starter for the Suwannee Bulldogs high school football team. As a senior in 1996, Davis was the team captain for the Suwannee Bulldogs football and basketball teams, and was recognized as a first-team Florida Class 4A all-state selection and a SuperPrep high school All-American in football.

== College career ==
Davis accepted an athletic scholarship to attend the University of Florida in Gainesville, Florida, where he played for coach Steve Spurrier's Gators teams from 1998 to 2001. The Gators coaching staff decided to red-shirt him as a true freshman in 1997. As a junior in 2000, Davis was a member of the Gators' Southeastern Conference (SEC) championship team. As a senior team captain in 2001, he was recognized as a first-team All-SEC selection and a second-team All-American. During his college career, he played in thirty-five games, and started twenty-three of them; he finished his career with 232 tackles, five quarterback sacks and four forced fumbles, three of which were recovered.

== Professional career ==
Pre-draft measurables
Height	Weight	Arm length	Hand span	40-yard dash	Vertical jump	Broad jump	Bench press
6 ft 0 7/8 in (1.85 m)	244 lb (111 kg)	33 1/2 in (0.85 m)	10 in (0.25 m)	4.77 s	31.5 in (0.80 m)	9 ft 4 in (2.84 m)	20 reps
All values from NFL Combine

=== Cleveland Browns ===
Davis was selected by the Cleveland Browns in the fifth round (141st pick overall) of the 2002 NFL Draft, and he played for the Browns for seven seasons from 2002 to 2008. Cleveland also selected André Davis in second round of the 2002 draft, requiring the linebacker to have his full name on the back of his jersey for his first three seasons. He made his NFL debut versus the Kansas City Chiefs on September 8, 2002. He finished his rookie season with 24 tackles and one interception.

Davis became the Browns starting middle linebacker in 2003 and finished the season leading the team with 171 tackles. He also tied a franchise record with 4 sacks in a single game that year against Kansas City on November 9, 2003. During the 2004 season he missed the final five games of the season with a knee injury, he finished the season with 89 tackles and three interceptions.

In 2005 Davis recorded a career high and team leading 199 tackles. His best game came against the Green Bay Packers on September 18 when he recorded 20 tackles. On November 20 he was named the AFC Defensive Player of the week after recording 14 tackles, 2 tfl and 2 pbu's in the 22–0 win over the Miami Dolphins. On December 15, 2005, the Browns gave him a five-year contract extension.

During the 2006 season Davis played in 14 games, finishing with 104 tackles, one sack and two interceptions. During the 2007 season he struggled starting only 10 of 16 games, finishing with only 67 tackles.

After the 2008 season, Davis became a free agent. He finished his seven seasons with the Browns starting 83 of 105 games, recording 711 tackles (484 unassisted), 8.5 sacks, and 8 interceptions.

After football Davis went on to attain his MBA degree in 2016.

=== Denver Broncos ===
On February 28, 2009, Davis signed a two-year contract with the Denver Broncos. They released him on March 11, 2010. In his single season with the Broncos, he started 13 of 16 games, recording 90 tackles and 3.5 sacks.

=== Buffalo Bills ===
Davis signed a two-year contract with the Buffalo Bills on March 16, 2010. During the 2010 season, he saw action in six games and started four of them. After appearing in sixteen games for the Bills during 2011, he became a free agent following the season.

== NFL career statistics ==
Legend
**Bold**	Career high

=== Regular season ===
Year	Team	Games		Tackles					Interceptions					Fumbles			
Year	Team	GP	GS	Cmb	Solo	Ast	Sck	TFL	Int	Yds	TD	Lng	PD	FF	FR	Yds	TD
2002	CLE	**16**	0	24	17	7	0.0	0	1	0	0	0	1	0	**1**	0	0
2003	CLE	**16**	**16**	138	**98**	40	**5.0**	6	0	0	0	0	**6**	**2**	0	0	0
2004	CLE	11	11	71	53	18	0.5	2	**3**	**35**	0	**30**	**6**	0	**1**	0	0
2005	CLE	**16**	**16**	**149**	89	**60**	2.0	9	1	14	0	14	**6**	0	0	0	0
2006	CLE	14	14	103	78	25	1.0	6	2	19	0	19	3	1	0	0	0
2007	CLE	**16**	10	67	51	16	0.0	5	0	0	0	0	4	1	0	0	0
2008	CLE	**16**	**16**	90	62	28	0.0	6	1	4	0	4	3	0	0	0	0
2009	DEN	**16**	13	90	67	23	3.5	**14**	0	0	0	0	3	0	0	0	0
2010	BUF	6	4	41	18	23	0.0	1	1	11	0	11	1	1	0	0	0
2011	BUF	**16**	3	14	6	8	0.0	1	0	0	0	0	0	0	0	0	0
Career		143	103	787	539	248	12.0	50	9	83	0	30	33	5	2	0	0

=== Playoffs ===
Year	Team	Games		Tackles					Interceptions					Fumbles			
Year	Team	GP	GS	Cmb	Solo	Ast	Sck	TFL	Int	Yds	TD	Lng	PD	FF	FR	Yds	TD
2002	CLE	**1**	0	0	0	0	0.0	0	0	0	0	0	0	0	0	0	0
Career		1	0	0	0	0	0.0	0	0	0	0	0	0	0	0	0	0

== See also ==
- 2001 College Football All-America Team
- History of the Cleveland Browns
- List of Buffalo Bills players
- List of Florida Gators football All-Americans
- List of Florida Gators in the NFL draft
