= Daven Holly =

American football player (born 1982)

No. 26, 39
- Position: Cornerback

Personal information
- Born: August 8, 1982 (age 44); Clairton, Pennsylvania, U.S.
- Listed height: 5 ft 10 in (1.78 m)
- Listed weight: 185 lb (84 kg)

Career information
- High school: Clairton
- College: Cincinnati
- NFL draft: 2005: 7th round, 215th overall pick

Career history
- San Francisco 49ers (2005)*; Chicago Bears (2005); Cleveland Browns (2006–2008)
- * Offseason or practice squad member only

Career NFL statistics
- Total tackles: 108
- Forced fumbles: 1
- Fumble recoveries: 2
- Pass deflections: 18
- Interceptions: 5
- Defensive touchdowns: 2
- Stats at Pro Football Reference

Daven Holly (born August 8, 1982) is an American former professional football player who was a cornerback in the National Football League (NFL). He played college football for the Cincinnati Bearcats and was selected by the San Francisco 49ers in the seventh round of the 2005 NFL draft.

Holly was also a member of the Chicago Bears and the Cleveland Browns.

== Early life ==
Holly attended Clairton High School where in his senior year made 45 receptions for 900 yards and seven touchdowns.

== College career ==
Holly played college football at the University of Cincinnati. During his time there he played in 49 games making 85 tackles, nine interceptions and one touchdown on defense. He majored in communications.

== Professional career ==
=== San Francisco 49ers ===
Holly was selected by the San Francisco 49ers in the seventh round (215th overall) in the 2005 NFL draft. On September 3, he was waived by the 49ers.

=== Chicago Bears ===
Holly was then claimed by the Chicago Bears on September 4. In his rookie season, he played in three games making seven tackles. He made his NFL debut at the Pittsburgh Steelers on December 11. He was waived by Chicago on June 15, 2006.

=== Cleveland Browns ===
Holly was signed by the Cleveland Browns as a free agent on July 13. He proved to be a valuable addition to a position that was decimated with injury. In his first season with the Browns he made 14 appearances and 12 starts during which he made 56 tackles and five interceptions which led the team, (one of his interceptions was returned for a touchdown versus the Pittsburgh Steelers on November 19). He also recorded his first fumble for a touchdown against the Tampa Bay Buccaneers on December 24.

In the 2007 season, Holly appeared in 15 games with six starts. He made 47 tackles.

In the 2008 offseason, Holly was tendered a one-year, $2 million contract. Despite tearing two knee ligaments during offseason workouts on May 21, the Browns did not rescind their tender and Holly signed it the day after his injury. He was subsequently waived/injured and reverted to season-ending injured reserve.

== NFL career statistics ==
Legend
	Led the league
**Bold**	Career high

Year	Team	Games		Tackles					Interceptions					Fumbles			
Year	Team	GP	GS	Cmb	Solo	Ast	Sck	TFL	Int	Yds	TD	Lng	PD	FF	FR	Yds	TD
2005	CHI	3	0	2	0	2	0.0	0	0	0	0	0	0	0	0	0	0
2006	CLE	14	**12**	**58**	**55**	**3**	0.0	**3**	**5**	**127**	**1**	**57**	**10**	0	**1**	**40**	**1**
2007	CLE	**15**	6	48	45	**3**	0.0	0	0	0	0	0	8	**1**	**1**	3	0
Career		32	18	108	100	8	0.0	3	5	127	1	57	18	1	2	43	1
