= Babatunde Oshinowo =

American football player (born 1983)

No. 96, 70
- Position: Defensive tackle

Personal information
- Born: January 14, 1983 (age 43); Columbus, Ohio, U.S.
- Listed height: 6 ft 1 in (1.85 m)
- Listed weight: 305 lb (138 kg)

Career information
- High school: Neuqua Valley (Naperville, Illinois)
- College: Stanford
- NFL draft: 2006: 6th round, 181st overall pick

Career history
- Cleveland Browns (2006); Chicago Bears (2007); Washington Redskins (2008)*; Philadelphia Eagles (2008)*; Carolina Panthers (2009)*; San Francisco 49ers (2009)*
- * Offseason or practice squad member only

Career NFL statistics
- Total tackles: 2
- Stats at Pro Football Reference

Babatunde Oluwasegun Temitope Oluwakorede Adisa "Baba" Oshinowo Jr. [Ba-ba-TOON-day OH-shi-no-whoa] (born January 14, 1983) is an American former professional football player who was a defensive tackle in the National Football League (NFL). His second name "Oluwasegun" means "God has been victorious" in the Yoruba language. He played college football for the Stanford Cardinal and was selected by the Cleveland Browns in the sixth round of the 2006 NFL draft.

Oshinowo was also a member of the Chicago Bears, Washington Redskins, Philadelphia Eagles, Carolina Panthers and San Francisco 49ers.

== Early life ==
Oshinowo played high school football at Neuqua Valley High School in Naperville, Illinois, where he was known as "OJ" Oshinowo. He was an All-Prep American as a Senior in defense at Neuqua. He holds two track and field records at Neuqua, one for shot put and one for discus. At Stanford, Oshinowo obtained a bachelor's degree in electrical engineering.

== Professional career ==
Pre-draft measurables
| Height | Weight | Arm length | Hand span | 40-yard dash | 10-yard split | 20-yard split | 20-yard shuttle | Three-cone drill | Vertical jump | Broad jump | Bench press |
|---|---|---|---|---|---|---|---|---|---|---|---|
| 6 ft 1 5/8 in (1.87 m) | 304 lb (138 kg) | 34 in (0.86 m) | 10 1/8 in (0.26 m) | 5.34 s | 1.79 s | 3.06 s | 4.54 s | 7.63 s | 32.0 in (0.81 m) | 8 ft 9 in (2.67 m) | 33 reps |
All values from NFL Combine/Pro Day

=== Cleveland Browns ===
On September 19, 2006, Cleveland signed Oshinowo from their practice squad. He was active for three games and played in the season finale against the Houston Texans, recording two tackles.

=== Chicago Bears ===
On September 19, 2007, the Chicago Bears signed Oshinowo to their practice squad. He was signed to the Bears active roster with three games remaining in the 2007 season. The Bears waived Oshinowo on May 7, 2008.

=== Washington Redskins ===
On July 29, 2008, the Washington Redskins signed Oshinowo and waived defensive tackle Zarnell Fitch. He was waived by the team on August 24.

=== Philadelphia Eagles ===
Oshinowo was signed to the practice squad of the Philadelphia Eagles on November 19, 2008, after linebacker Andy Studebaker was signed by the Kansas City Chiefs.

=== Carolina Panthers ===
Oshinowo signed a future contract with the Carolina Panthers on January 28, 2009. He was waived on June 26, 2009.

=== San Francisco 49ers ===
Oshinowo was signed by the San Francisco 49ers on July 30, 2009. Oshinowo was waived by the 49ers on August 7 after the team signed wide receiver Chris Francies.

== Personal life ==
On June 15, 2019, Oshinowo earned his MBA from the University of Chicago Booth School of Business.

Oshinowo is currently a vice president at Sandbox Industries.
