= DeMario Minter =

American football player (born 1984)

No. 22, 23
- Position: Cornerback

Personal information
- Born: February 20, 1984 (age 42); Stone Mountain, Georgia, U.S.
- Listed height: 5 ft 11 in (1.80 m)
- Listed weight: 195 lb (88 kg)

Career information
- High school: Stephenson (Stone Mountain, Georgia)
- College: Georgia
- NFL draft: 2006: 5th round, 152nd overall pick

Career history
- Cleveland Browns (2006–2007); Kansas City Chiefs (2007)*; Arizona Cardinals (2007–2008)*; Florida Tuskers (2009)*
- * Offseason or practice squad member only

Awards and highlights
- First-team All-SEC (2005)

DeMario Minter (born February 20, 1984) is an American former football cornerback. He was originally drafted by the Cleveland Browns in the fifth round of the 2006 NFL draft. He played college football at Georgia.

Minter was also a member of the Kansas City Chiefs, Arizona Cardinals and Florida Tuskers.

== Early life ==
Minter played high school football at Stephenson High School in Stone Mountain, Georgia,

== College career ==
Minter played college football for the Georgia Bulldogs and garnered First-team All-SEC honors by the Associated Press in 2005.

== Professional career ==
Pre-draft measurables
Height	Weight	Arm length	Hand span	40-yard dash	10-yard split	20-yard split	20-yard shuttle	Three-cone drill	Vertical jump	Broad jump	Bench press
5 ft 11 1/8 in (1.81 m)	190 lb (86 kg)	31 1/2 in (0.80 m)	8 1/8 in (0.21 m)	4.49 s	1.56 s	2.60 s	4.10 s	6.87 s	38.5 in (0.98 m)	10 ft 11 in (3.33 m)	10 reps
All values from NFL Combine/Pro Day

=== Cleveland Browns ===
In 2006, during a pre-training camp workout with the Browns, Minter suffered a season-ending knee injury. On September 1, 2007, he was released by the Browns.

=== Florida Tuskers ===
Minter was signed by the Florida Tuskers of the United Football League on September 3, 2009. He was released on September 22.
