= Sean Jones (safety) =

American football player (born 1982)

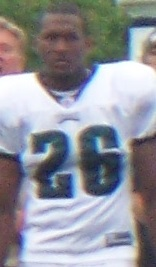
- Jones with the Philadelphia Eagles in 2009

No. 26
- Position: Safety

Personal information
- Born: March 2, 1982 (age 44); Atlanta, Georgia, U.S.
- Listed height: 6 ft 1 in (1.85 m)
- Listed weight: 220 lb (100 kg)

Career information
- High school: Westlake (Atlanta)
- College: Georgia
- NFL draft: 2004: 2nd round, 59th overall pick

Career history
- Cleveland Browns (2004–2008); Philadelphia Eagles (2009); Tampa Bay Buccaneers (2010–2011); Detroit Lions (2012)*
- * Offseason or practice squad member only

Awards and highlights
- First-team All-American (2003); First-team All-SEC (2003)

Career NFL statistics
- Total tackles: 514
- Sacks: 4
- Forced fumbles: 3
- Fumble recoveries: 7
- Interceptions: 17
- Stats at Pro Football Reference

Sean Jones (born March 2, 1982) is an American former professional football player who was a safety in the National Football League (NFL). He played college football for the Georgia Bulldogs and was selected by the Cleveland Browns in the second round of the 2004 NFL draft and also played for the Philadelphia Eagles and Tampa Bay Buccaneers.

== Early life ==
Jones attended Westlake High School where he played both as a quarterback and a safety. He passed for 2,490 yards and 31 touchdowns and also rushed for 806 yards with 11 touchdowns as a senior.

== College career ==
Jones played in 37 games at the University of Georgia, starting 24 times and finished with 250 tackles, 1 sack, 10 stops for losses, four quarterback pressures, three fumble recoveries, seven interceptions, and four blocked kicks. He was an education major.

== Professional career ==
Pre-draft measurables
Height	Weight	40-yard dash	Three-cone drill	Vertical jump	Broad jump
6 ft 1 in (1.85 m)	212 lb (96 kg)	4.63 s	7.21 s	36 1/2 in (0.93 m)	10 ft 2 in (3.10 m)
40-yard dash was taken at Pro Day; all other measurables were taken at the NFL Scouting Combine.

=== Cleveland Browns ===
Jones was selected by the Cleveland Browns in the second round (59th overall) in the 2004 NFL draft. However, he missed his entire rookie season due to a knee injury suffered before the start of the season.

In the 2005 season, he appeared in all 16 games, playing mostly on special teams. He made his NFL debut versus the Cincinnati Bengals on September 11 and finished the season with 23 total tackles.

In 2006, Jones started all 16 regular season games and recorded 111 tackles. He also led all NFL strong safeties with five interceptions. He made a career-high 13 tackles at the Cincinnati Bengals on September 17. He was named the AFC Defensive Player of the week with three tackles and two interceptions versus the New York Jets on October 29.

Just as he did in the previous season, he started in all 16 regular season games of the 2007 season. He had 96 tackles and five interceptions, which again led all players at his position.

In 2008 he returned to the Browns as the starting strong safety again. This time only starting 12 games due to injury. He still tallied 56 tackles, 1 forced fumble, 4 interceptions, and 4 deflected passes.

=== Philadelphia Eagles ===
In 2009, Jones replaced Brian Dawkins as the starting free safety for the Philadelphia Eagles. An unrestricted free agent in the 2009 offseason, Jones was signed to a one-year contract worth $3 million by the Philadelphia Eagles on March 6. It was reported that Jones had to take a pay cut around $500,000 to stay on the roster for 2009. In week 11, Jones intercepted Chicago Bears quarterback Jay Cutler on the team's last drive to preserve a 24–20 victory for the Eagles.

=== Tampa Bay Buccaneers ===
On March 16, 2010, Jones signed a two-year contract with the Tampa Bay Buccaneers.

=== Detroit Lions ===
Jones signed with the Detroit Lions on June 25, 2012. He was released on August 27, 2012.

== NFL career statistics ==
Legend
**Bold**	Career high

=== Regular season ===
Year	Team	Games		Tackles					Interceptions					Fumbles			
Year	Team	GP	GS	Cmb	Solo	Ast	Sck	TFL	Int	Yds	TD	Lng	PD	FF	FR	Yds	TD
2005	CLE	**16**	0	23	16	7	0.0	0	0	0	0	0	0	0	1	**11**	0
2006	CLE	**16**	**16**	**111**	71	**40**	0.5	**3**	**5**	**46**	0	19	**16**	0	1	-3	0
2007	CLE	**16**	**16**	96	69	27	0.5	**3**	**5**	37	0	26	10	**1**	0	0	0
2008	CLE	12	12	56	48	8	0.0	**3**	4	27	0	20	4	**1**	0	0	0
2009	PHI	15	9	62	45	17	**1.0**	**3**	2	37	0	**37**	5	0	**2**	-1	0
2010	TAM	**16**	**16**	74	55	19	**1.0**	**3**	1	45	0	31	2	0	1	0	0
2011	TAM	**16**	**16**	92	**76**	16	**1.0**	**3**	0	0	0	0	3	**1**	**2**	0	0
		107	85	514	380	134	4.0	18	17	192	0	37	40	3	7	7	0

=== Playoffs ===
Year	Team	Games		Tackles					Interceptions					Fumbles			
Year	Team	GP	GS	Cmb	Solo	Ast	Sck	TFL	Int	Yds	TD	Lng	PD	FF	FR	Yds	TD
2009	PHI	**1**	0	**4**	**4**	0	0.0	0	0	0	0	0	0	0	0	0	0
		1	0	4	4	0	0.0	0	0	0	0	0	0	0	0	0	0
