= Gary Baxter =

American football player (born 1978)

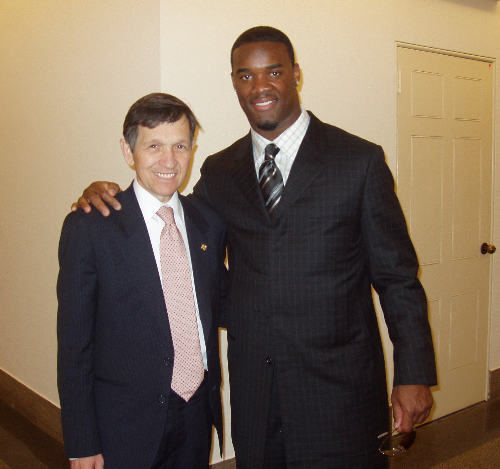
- Baxter with Dennis Kucinich in 2006

No. 28, 24
- Positions: Cornerback, safety

Personal information
- Born: November 24, 1978 (age 47); Tyler, Texas, U.S.
- Listed height: 6 ft 2 in (1.88 m)
- Listed weight: 210 lb (95 kg)

Career information
- High school: John Tyler (Tyler)
- College: Baylor
- NFL draft: 2001: 2nd round, 62nd overall pick

Career history
- Baltimore Ravens (2001–2004); Cleveland Browns (2005–2007)

Awards and highlights
- First-team All-Big 12 (2000); Second-team All-Big 12 (1998)

Career NFL statistics
- Total tackles: 299
- Sacks: 3
- Forced fumbles: 3
- Pass deflections: 48
- Interceptions: 8
- Stats at Pro Football Reference

Gary Wayne Baxter (born November 24, 1978) is an American former professional football player who was a cornerback in the National Football League (NFL). He played college football for the Baylor Bears and was selected by the Baltimore Ravens in the second round of the 2001 NFL draft.

== College career ==
Baxter played college football for the Baylor Bears where he played in 41 games making 202 tackles and six interceptions. He would return to the college in 2003 and graduated with a degree in speech communications.

== Professional career ==
=== Baltimore Ravens ===
Baxter was selected out of Baylor University in the second round, with the 62nd overall pick of the 2001 NFL draft by the Baltimore Ravens. After playing in a situational and reserve role for Baltimore during his rookie season, Baxter started 46 games over the next three years (eight at safety, 38 at cornerback). During this time, he became a solid member of one of the NFL's best defenses. For his career, he recorded six interceptions, 36 passes defended, three sacks, 253 tackles, and two forced fumbles.

Baxter is perhaps best known for a play made in a 2004 game against the Pittsburgh Steelers, in which he inadvertently caused an injury to the Steelers' starting quarterback, Tommy Maddox, forcing their rookie quarterback Ben Roethlisberger into action. Roethlisberger was unable to salvage the win and the Ravens won the game 30–13.

=== Cleveland Browns ===
On March 2, 2005, Baxter signed a six-year, $30 million free agent contract with the Browns that included a $10.5 million signing bonus. His career with the Browns was injury-plagued, including a concussion, and a torn pectoral muscle that caused him to miss 11 games during the 2005 season.

On October 22, 2006, Baxter's career was dealt a major blow when he tore the patella tendons in both knees during a game against the Denver Broncos. He was the first NFL player to suffer such an injury in 13 years.

On July 30, 2007, Baxter returned to practice, although in limited capacity. The recovery, which surprised and confounded many doctors close to Baxter, marked the first time that a player had returned to the field of play after such a devastating injury. On October 23, 2007, the Browns placed Baxter on injured reserve.

On August 9, 2008, he was released by the Browns.

== Statistics ==
Season	Team	League	Games	Total Tackles	Solo	Tackles for Losses	Sacks	Interceptions
1997	Baylor	Big 12	8	8	6	0	0	0
1998	Baylor	Big 12	11	45	36	2	0	4
1999	Baylor	Big 12	11	53	43	0	0	2
2000	Baylor	Big 12	N/A^{1}	N/A^{1}	N/A^{1}	N/A^{1}	N/A^{1}	N/A^{1}
2001	Baltimore	AFC	6	6	5	0	0	0
2002	Baltimore	AFC	16	90	75	0	0	1
2003	Baltimore	AFC	16	106	88	0	1	3
2004	Baltimore	AFC	16	86	78	0	2	1
2005	Cleveland	AFC	5	20	17	1	0	2
2006	Cleveland	AFC	3	21	12	0	0	1

^{1}Statistics unavailable
