= Romeo Crennel =

American football player and coach (born 1947)

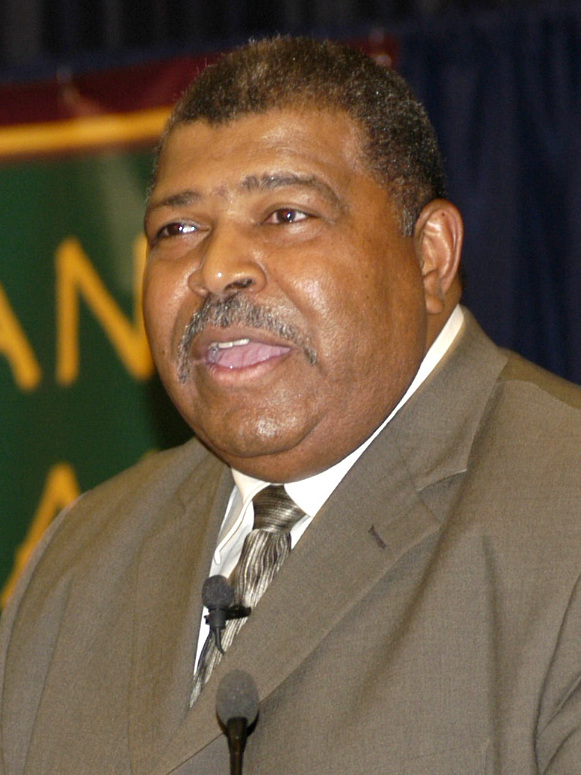
- Crennel in 2005

Personal information
- Born: June 18, 1947 (age 79); Lynchburg, Virginia, U.S.

Career information
- High school: Fort Knox (KY)
- College: Western Kentucky (1966–1969)
- NFL draft: 1970: undrafted

Career history
- Western Kentucky (1970) Graduate assistant; Western Kentucky (1971–1974) Defensive line coach; Texas Tech (1975–1977) Defensive assistant; Ole Miss (1978–1979) Defensive ends coach; Georgia Tech (1980) Defensive line coach; New York Giants (1981–1982) Assistant special teams coach; New York Giants (1983–1989) Special teams coach; New York Giants (1990–1992) Defensive line coach; New England Patriots (1993–1996) Defensive line coach; New York Jets (1997–1999) Defensive line coach; Cleveland Browns (2000) Defensive coordinator; New England Patriots (2001–2004) Defensive coordinator; Cleveland Browns (2005–2008) Head coach; Kansas City Chiefs (2010–2011) Defensive coordinator; Kansas City Chiefs (2011) Interim head coach; Kansas City Chiefs (2012) Head coach; Houston Texans (2014–2016) Defensive coordinator; Houston Texans (2017) Assistant head coach; Houston Texans (2018–2019) Assistant head coach & defensive coordinator; Houston Texans (2020) Interim head coach; Houston Texans (2021) Senior adviser

Awards and highlights
- As coach: 5× Super Bowl champion (XXI, XXV, XXXVI, XXXVIII, XXXIX); PFW Assistant Coach of the Year (2003)

Head coaching record
- Regular season: 32–63 (.337)
- Coaching profile at Pro Football Reference

Romeo Ashbey Crennel (born June 18, 1947) is an American former football coach. A long-time coaching assistant to Bill Parcells, Crennel served as the head coach of the Cleveland Browns from 2005 to 2008 and the Kansas City Chiefs in 2012, as well an assistant coach for six NFL teams and four collegiate teams. He has over 50 years of coaching experience, which included consistently being employed as a coach for all but two seasons since 1970 to 2021, only taking the 2009 and 2013 seasons off following both of his tenures as a permanent head coach. He has won five Super Bowl wins as an assistant coach, two with the New York Giants and three with the New England Patriots.

From 2014 to 2021, Crennel has served as an assistant coach for the Houston Texans under head coaches Bill O'Brien and David Culley, and served as the team's interim head coach during the 2020 season after O'Brien was fired following a 0–4 start. At 73 years and 115 days of age at the time of his promotion to interim coach, Crennel is the oldest person in NFL history to serve as a head coach, a record previously held by former Chicago Bears head coach/owner and NFL co-founder George Halas, who was 72 years and 318 days old when he coached the final game of his career on December 17, 1967. Crennel is also the first black head coach for the Texans and the Browns.

== Playing career ==
Crennel played baseball and football at Fort Knox High School in Kentucky and Amherst County High School in Virginia before committing to college football at Western Kentucky. Although he was a four-year starter as a defensive lineman, he became an offensive lineman during his senior season at the request of the coaching staff. He was named the team's most valuable player after the switch, but was not drafted and never played in the NFL. While the move may have hindered his draft chances, it increased his knowledge of the game, by experiencing the trenches from both the offensive and defensive side of the football. Crennel earned a bachelor's degree in physical education from Western Kentucky University, and then a master's degree while serving as a graduate assistant for the school in 1970.

== Coaching career ==
=== Western Kentucky University ===
After one season as a graduate assistant with Western Kentucky (1970), Crennel served as the defensive line coach for three seasons (1971–1974).

=== Texas Tech ===
After four seasons at WKU, he became an assistant for defensive coordinator Bill Parcells and head coach Steve Sloan at Texas Tech for three seasons (1975–1977).

=== Ole Miss and Georgia Tech ===
Crennel finished his collegiate career with two seasons as the defensive ends coach for Ole Miss (1978–1979) and one season as the defensive line coach for Georgia Tech (1980).

=== New York Giants ===
After spending two seasons as an assistant with the New York Giants, Crennel became the special teams coach for seven seasons (1983–1989) and the defensive line coach for three seasons (1990–1992). In 1983, he was reunited with Parcells as the head coach.

When Parcells stepped down as Giants head coach after Super Bowl XXV, Crennel stayed with the team under the two-year tenure of Ray Handley.

=== New England Patriots and New York Jets ===
Crennel left the Giants after the 1992 season and worked as the defensive line coach for the New England Patriots for four seasons (1993–1996) and for the New York Jets for three seasons (1997–1999) during the time that Parcells was the head coach in each franchise.

=== Cleveland Browns ===
Crennel was hired as the Cleveland Browns' defensive coordinator for the 2000 season.

=== Return to New England ===
After one season in Cleveland, he filled the same role with the Patriots for four seasons (2001–2004) under long-time friend Bill Belichick. Crennel and Belichick both served as assistant coaches for the New York Giants, Patriots, and New York Jets, all coached by Bill Parcells from 1981 to 1990 and 1996–1999. Crennel helped lead New England to three Super Bowl victories (XXXVI, XXXVIII, and XXXIX).

Before beginning the 2003 playoffs with the Patriots, Crennel interviewed for head-coaching positions with six teams in under 36 hours. He was not offered any jobs and was passed up by the New York Giants, Buffalo Bills, Arizona Cardinals, Chicago Bears, and Atlanta Falcons.

=== Return to Cleveland ===
Crennel was hired to replace Butch Davis as head coach of the Cleveland Browns on February 8, 2005. He went 24–40 in his tenure with the Browns. His team went 6–10 and 4–12 in his first two seasons with the Browns, finishing last or tied for last in the AFC North. The Browns finished the 2007 season with a 10–6 record, just falling short of making the playoffs. The 2007 season was the franchise's second winning season since its revival in 1999. Crennel's success in the 2007 season earned him a two-year contract extension in January 2008.

On December 29, 2008, following a disappointing 4–12 season, Crennel was fired by the Browns.

Crennel had hip replacement surgery in early 2009 and decided to sit out the 2009 football season while recuperating.

=== Kansas City Chiefs ===
On January 13, 2010, Crennel was hired as the Kansas City Chiefs defensive coordinator, reuniting him with offensive coordinator Charlie Weis and general manager Scott Pioli from their days with the Patriots.

Following Todd Haley's termination as the team's head coach after 13 games in the 2011 season, Crennel was named the team's interim head coach for the remaining three games of the season. Crennel won his first game as the interim head coach of the Chiefs on December 18, 2011, against the then undefeated Green Bay Packers 19–14, which was significant as Crennel snapped the Packers' 19-game winning streak and ended their hopes for a perfect season. Crennel finished his stint as interim head coach with a 2–1 record. However, in his tenure as a head coach for the Chiefs, Crennel would only win 2 more games finishing with a 4–15 overall record.

On January 9, 2012, Crennel was named the 11th full-time head coach in Chiefs history. Three days later, Crennel announced his intent to remain as defensive coordinator during his tenure as head coach.

On November 5, 2012, Crennel announced he would be stepping down as defensive coordinator and named linebackers coach Gary Gibbs to the vacant position, after a 1–7 start to the season.

On December 1, 2012, Crennel attempted to prevent the suicide of player Jovan Belcher by talking to him and witnessed his death by a self-inflicted gunshot wound to the head. The following day, Crennel coached his team to a 27–21 victory over the Carolina Panthers, the Chiefs' first home victory since defeating the Packers the previous season, and the only other home win during his tenure.

On December 31, 2012, Crennel was fired as head coach.

=== Houston Texans ===
On January 20, 2014, Crennel signed a 3-year deal with the NFL's Houston Texans becoming their new defensive coordinator under their new head coach Bill O'Brien. He was one of the highest paid defensive coordinators in the NFL for three seasons (2014–2016), earning roughly $1.8 million per year. Crennel finished the 2016 year with the NFL's #1 ranked defense and in January 2017 was promoted to assistant head coach. On January 20, 2018, he returned to his role as defensive coordinator for the Texans after Mike Vrabel left to become head coach of the Tennessee Titans.

Crennel was named the interim head coach for the Texans on October 5, 2020, after O'Brien was fired following an 0–4 start to begin the 2020 NFL season. In his first game as interim head coach, at the age of 73 years and 115 days, he became the oldest head coach in National Football League history, a game the Texans won 30–14 over the Jacksonville Jaguars. Crennel also became the Texans' first African American head coach in franchise history, albeit on an interim basis. Crennel was retained under new Texans head coach David Culley along with a new coaching staff in 2021, being given the title of senior advisor for football performance on March 10, 2021. Crennel's last game as an NFL coach was on January 9, 2022, a 25–28 loss to the Tennessee Titans, as he announced his retirement from coaching on June 6, 2022.

== Head coaching record ==
Team	Year	Regular season					Postseason			
Team	Year	Won	Lost	Ties	Win %	Finish	Won	Lost	Win %	Result
CLE	2005	6	10	0	.375	3rd in AFC North	—	—	—	—
CLE	2006	4	12	0	.250	4th in AFC North	—	—	—	—
CLE	2007	10	6	0	.625	2nd in AFC North	—	—	—	—
CLE	2008	4	12	0	.250	4th in AFC North	—	—	—	—
CLE total		24	40	0	.375		0	0	.000	
KC*	2011	2	1	0	.667	4th in AFC West	—	—	—	—
KC	2012	2	14	0	.125	4th in AFC West	—	—	—	—
KC total		4	15	0	.211		0	0	.000	
HOU*	2020	4	8	0	.333	3rd in AFC South	—	—	—	—
HOU total		4	8	0	.333		0	0	.000	
Total		32	63	0	.337		0	0	.000	

* – Interim head coach

== Personal life ==
Crennel had hip replacement surgery in early 2009 and decided to sit out the 2009 football season while recuperating.
