= 2014 Cleveland Browns season =

66th season in franchise history

- Owner: Jimmy Haslam
- General manager: Ray Farmer
- Head coach: Mike Pettine
- Home stadium: FirstEnergy Stadium

Results
- Record: 7–9
- Division place: 4th AFC North
- Playoffs: Did not qualify
- Pro Bowlers: FS Tashaun Gipson; CB Joe Haden (captain); OT Joe Thomas; SS Donte Whitner

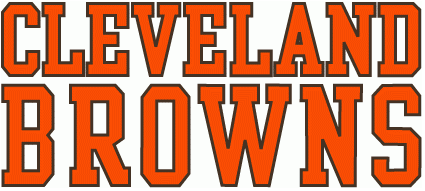
Cleveland Browns wordmark used since 2006.

The 2014 season was the Cleveland Browns' 62nd in the National Football League (NFL), their 66th overall, and their first under new head coach Mike Pettine and general manager Ray Farmer. The Browns improved upon their 4–12 record from 2013, finishing 7–9. The team started the season 6–3 with sole possession of the AFC North lead, but lost six of their last seven games to finish 7–9 and fail to make the playoffs for the 12th consecutive year, the longest postseason drought in franchise history. This also marked the Browns' seventh consecutive season with a losing record.

== Offseason ==
=== Personnel changes ===
==== Coaching staff changes ====
On December 29, 2013, the Browns fired head coach Rob Chudzinski. In his only season as coach, Chudzinski posted a record of 4–12, including a 7-game losing streak to end the season, although he ended the Browns' 11-game losing streak to the division rival Baltimore Ravens. Offensive coordinator Norv Turner left the team to take the same position with the Minnesota Vikings, and defensive coordinator Ray Horton took the same position with the Tennessee Titans.

On January 23, 2014, the Browns hired former Buffalo Bills' defensive coordinator Mike Pettine as head coach. Pettine served as defensive coordinator of the Bills in 2013, defensive coordinator of the New York Jets from 2009 to 2012, and a defensive assistant with the Baltimore Ravens from 2002 to 2008. This was Pettine's first opportunity as an NFL head coach.

On January 27, the Browns hired former Bills' linebackers coach Jim O'Neil as defensive coordinator. O'Neil has served as a defensive assistant under Pettine with both the Jets and the Bills.

Also, on January 27, the Browns filled out their defensive coaching staff by adding three assistant coaches who worked under Pettine in Buffalo: Chuck Driesbach as linebackers coach, Brian Fleury as assistant linebackers coach and Jeff Hafley as secondary coach. The Browns also hired former Tampa Bay Buccaneers' tight ends coach Brian Angelichio to the same position and retained assistant secondary coach Bobby Babich, special teams coach Chris Tabor, and assistant special teams coach Shawn Mennenga from Chudzinski's coaching staff.

On February 3, the Browns hired former Washington Redskins' offensive coordinator Kyle Shanahan to take the same position with the team. Shanahan, the son of Super Bowl champion head coach Mike Shanahan, served as the Houston Texans' offensive coordinator from 2008 to 2009, and the Redskins' offensive coordinator from 2010 to 2013.

==== Front office changes ====
On February 11, the Browns fired general manager Mike Lombardi and promoted assistant general manager Ray Farmer to take his place as GM. In addition, CEO Joe Banner resigned from his role with the team.

Also on February 11, the Browns hired Bill Kuharich as assistant general manager to Farmer. Kuharich worked with Farmer in the Kansas City Chiefs player personnel department, and has also worked in the New Orleans Saints player personnel department.

=== Roster changes ===
==== Free agents ====
Pos	Player	Tag	2014 Team	Signed
G	Oniel Cousins	UFA	Tampa Bay Buccaneers	March 16
K	Billy Cundiff	UFA	Cleveland Browns	March 6
G	Shawn Lauvao	UFA	Washington Redskins	March 11
C	Alex Mack	UFA/TT	Cleveland Browns	April 11
RB	Willis McGahee	UFA		
LB	Craig Robertson	ERFA	Cleveland Browns	March 6
S	T. J. Ward	UFA	Denver Broncos	March 11

Players shaded in green re-signed with the Browns
UFA: Unrestricted free agent

RFA: Restricted free agent
ERFA: Exclusive rights free agent
FT: Player was designated with the franchise tag
TT: Player was designated with the transition tag

==== Releases ====
Pos	Player	Released	2014 Team	Signed
WR	Davone Bess	March 5		
QB	Jason Campbell	March 12	Cincinnati Bengals	March 19
LB	D'Qwell Jackson	February 26	Indianapolis Colts	March 6
WR	Greg Little	May 16	Oakland Raiders	May 19
QB	Brandon Weeden	March 12	Dallas Cowboys	March 17

==== Signings ====
Pos	Player	2013 Team	Signed
WR	Anthony Armstrong	N/A	May 19
WR	Miles Austin	Dallas Cowboys	May 15
WR	Earl Bennett	Chicago Bears	May 15
WR	Nate Burleson	Detroit Lions	April 6
LB	Karlos Dansby	Arizona Cardinals	March 11
LB	Zac Diles	Tennessee Titans	May 1
TE	Jim Dray	Arizona Cardinals	March 13
WR	Andrew Hawkins	Cincinnati Bengals	March 18
G	Paul McQuistan	Seattle Seahawks	March 24
FB	Chris Pressley	Cincinnati Bengals	April 14
RB	Ben Tate	Houston Texans	March 15
QB	Tyler Thigpen	N/A	May 1
CB	Isaiah Trufant	New York Jets	March 11
S	Donte Whitner	San Francisco 49ers	March 11
QB	Vince Young	Green Bay Packers	May 1

==== Draft ====
2014 Cleveland Browns draft
Round	Pick	Player	Position	College	Notes
1	8	Justin Gilbert	CB	Oklahoma St	Pick from MIN
1	22	Johnny Manziel	QB	Texas A&M	Pick from PHI
2	35	Joel Bitonio *	OT	Nevada	
3	71	Christian Kirksey	LB	Iowa	
3	94	Terrance West	RB	Towson	Pick from SF
4	127	Pierre Desir	CB	Lindenwood	
Made roster † Pro Football Hall of Fame * Made at least one Pro Bowl during career

Notes

- The Browns traded their original first-round selection (No. 4 overall) to the Buffalo Bills in exchange for the Bills' first round selection (No. 9 overall) and their 2015 first and fourth round selections.

- The Browns then traded the No. 9 overall selection, along with their fifth round selection (No. 145 overall) to the Minnesota Vikings in exchange for the No. 8 overall selection.

- The Browns acquired an additional first-round selection (No. 26 overall) in a trade that sent running back Trent Richardson to the Indianapolis Colts.

- The Browns traded the No. 26 selection, along with a third round selection (No. 83 overall), to the Philadelphia Eagles in exchange for the No. 22 overall selection.

- The Browns acquired an additional third-round selection (No. 83 overall) in a trade that sent the team's 2013 fourth-round selection to the Pittsburgh Steelers. This selection was later traded to the Eagles (see above).
- The Browns acquired an additional fourth-round selection (No. 127 overall) in a trade that sent the team's 2013 fifth-round selection to the Indianapolis Colts.

The Browns did not have selections from rounds 5–7 as a result of the following trades:

- Trading the No. 145 selection to the Minnesota Vikings (see above).
- Trading the No. 106 and No. 180 selections to the San Francisco 49ers in exchange for the No. 94 selection.
- Trading traded the No. 218 selection to the Baltimore Ravens in exchange for their sixth-round selection in the 2015 NFL draft.

==== Undrafted free agent signings ====
Pos	Player	College	Signed
FB	Ray Agnew III	Southern Illinois	May 12
DL	Calvin Barnett	Oklahoma State	May 12
DB	Darwin Cook	West Virginia	May 12
RB	Isaiah Crowell	Alabama State	May 12
OL	Anthony Dima	Massachusetts	May 12
WR	Chandler Jones	San Jose State	May 12
WR	Jonathan Krause	Vanderbilt	May 12
DL	Elhadji Ndiaye	Nebraska-Kearney	May 15
OL	Michael Philipp	Oregon State	May 12
QB	Connor Shaw	South Carolina	May 12
WR	Kenny Shaw	Florida State	May 12
WR	Willie Snead	Ball State	May 12

==== Gordon suspension ====
On May 9, it was announced that wide receiver Josh Gordon could face a possible season-long suspension due to a fourth failed drug test. On July 4, 2014, Josh Gordon was arrested for DWI in Raleigh, NC. On August 27, the suspension was upheld after Gordon's appeal. On September 12, after the NFL and the NFLPA approved a new drug testing program, Gordon's suspension was retroactively reduced to 10 games. On November 17, his reinstatement was officially announced and he returned Week 12 at the Georgia Dome, against the Atlanta Falcons, on November 23.

== Preseason ==
=== Schedule ===
Week	Date	Opponent	Result	Record	Game site	NFL.com recap
1	August 9	at Detroit Lions	L 12–13	0–1	Ford Field	Recap
2	August 18	at Washington Redskins	L 23–24	0–2	FedExField	Recap
3	August 23	St. Louis Rams	L 14–33	0–3	FirstEnergy Stadium	Recap
4	August 28	Chicago Bears	W 33–13	1–3	FirstEnergy Stadium	Recap

== Regular season ==
=== Schedule ===
The Browns had no games west of the Mississippi River in 2014, by virtue of their conference rotation with NFC South and AFC South division opponents, and common position Bills and Raiders – the Raiders being based in the Pacific Time Zone but scheduled to play the Browns at FirstEnergy Stadium. Their only game outside of the Eastern Time Zone was in Nashville, Tennessee against the Tennessee Titans in Week 5. Their November 6 game in Week 10 was their only scheduled national television appearance on the NFL Network, against the Cincinnati Bengals.

Week	Date	Opponent	Result	Record	Game site	NFL.com recap
1	September 7	at **Pittsburgh Steelers**	**L** 27–30	0–1	Heinz Field	Recap
2	September 14	New Orleans Saints	**W** 26–24	1–1	FirstEnergy Stadium	Recap
3	September 21	**Baltimore Ravens**	**L** 21–23	1–2	FirstEnergy Stadium	Recap
4	Bye					
5	October 5	at Tennessee Titans	**W** 29–28	2–2	LP Field	Recap
6	October 12	**Pittsburgh Steelers**	**W** 31–10	3–2	FirstEnergy Stadium	Recap
7	October 19	at Jacksonville Jaguars	**L** 6–24	3–3	EverBank Field	Recap
8	October 26	Oakland Raiders	**W** 23–13	4–3	FirstEnergy Stadium	Recap
9	November 2	Tampa Bay Buccaneers	**W** 22–17	5–3	FirstEnergy Stadium	Recap
10	November 6	at **Cincinnati Bengals**	**W** 24–3	6–3	Paul Brown Stadium	Recap
11	November 16	Houston Texans	**L** 7–23	6–4	FirstEnergy Stadium	Recap
12	November 23	at Atlanta Falcons	**W** 26–24	7–4	Georgia Dome	Recap
13	November 30	at Buffalo Bills	**L** 10–26	7–5	Ralph Wilson Stadium	Recap
14	December 7	Indianapolis Colts	**L** 24–25	7–6	FirstEnergy Stadium	Recap
15	December 14	**Cincinnati Bengals**	**L** 0–30	7–7	FirstEnergy Stadium	Recap
16	December 21	at Carolina Panthers	**L** 13–17	7–8	Bank of America Stadium	Recap
17	December 28	at **Baltimore Ravens**	**L** 10–20	7–9	M&T Bank Stadium	Recap

Note: Intra-division opponents are in bold text.

=== Game summaries ===
==== Week 1: at Pittsburgh Steelers ====
Week One: Cleveland Browns at Pittsburgh Steelers – Game summary

Quarter	1	2	3	4	Total
Browns	3	0	14	10	**27**
**Steelers**	10	17	0	3	**30**

at Heinz Field, Pittsburgh, Pennsylvania

- Date: September 7
- Game time: 1:00 p.m. EDT
- Game weather: 71 °F (21.7 °C), partly cloudy
- Game attendance: 64,598
- Referee: Carl Cheffers
- TV announcers (CBS): Ian Eagle, Dan Fouts and Jenny Dell
- Recap, Gamebook

Game information

First quarter

- PIT (9:58) - Shaun Suisham 36 yd field goal
  **Steelers 3, Browns 0** Drive: 9 plays, 62 yds, 5:02
- CLE (5:39) - Billy Cundiff 39 yd field goal
  **Steelers 3, Browns 3** Drive: 8 plays, 54 yds, 4:19
- PIT (1:24) - LeGarrette Blount 7 yd run (Shaun Suisham kick)
  **Steelers 10, Browns 3** Drive: 9 plays, 80 yds, 4:49

Second quarter

- PIT (9:49) - Antonio Brown 35 yd pass from Ben Roethlisberger (Shaun Suisham kick)
  **Steelers 17, Browns 3** Drive: 6 plays, 89 yds, 3:12
- PIT (7:43) - Le'Veon Bell 38 yd run (Shaun Suisham kick)
  **Steelers 24, Browns 3** Drive: 2 plays, 50 yds, 0:48
- PIT (0:00) - Shaun Suisham 34 yd field goal
  **Steelers 27, Browns 3** Drive: 10 plays, 64 yds, 1:44

Third quarter

- CLE (13:27) - Isaiah Crowell 3 yd run (Billy Cundiff kick)
  **Steelers 27, Browns 10** Drive: 6 plays, 80 yds, 1:33
- CLE (9:05) - Isaiah Crowell 15 yd run (Billy Cundiff kick)
  **Steelers 27, Browns 17** Drive: 6 plays, 59 yds, 2:31

Fourth quarter

- CLE (14:57) - Billy Cundiff 24 yd field goal
  **Steelers 27, Browns 20** Drive: 12 plays, 75 yds, 4:42
- CLE (11:15) - Travis Benjamin 9 yd pass from Brian Hoyer (Billy Cundiff kick)
  **Steelers 27, Browns 27** Drive: 7 plays, 51 yds, 2:35
- PIT (0:00) - Shaun Suisham 41 yd field goal
  **Steelers 30, Browns 27** Drive: 5 plays, 33 yds, 0:47

Top passers

- CLE – Brian Hoyer - 19/31, 230 yds, 1 TD
- PIT – Ben Roethlisberger - 23/34, 365 yds, 1 TD, 1 INT

Top rushers

- CLE – Terrance West - 16 carr, 100 yds
- PIT – Le'Veon Bell - 21 carr, 109 yds, 1 TD

Top receivers

- CLE – Andrew Hawkins - 8 rec, 87 yds
- PIT – Antonio Brown - 5 rec, 116 yds, 1 TD

Top defenders

- CLE – Donte Whitner - 13 tackles
- PIT – Troy Polamalu - 11 tackles

The Steelers dominated the first half, and the Browns trailed 27–3 at halftime. However, the Browns scored 24 straight points in the second half to tie the game at 27–27. The comeback attempt fell short as Steelers K Shaun Suisham kicked a 41-yard game-winning field goal as time expired. With the loss, the Browns lost their tenth straight season opener, setting an NFL record. It was also their eleventh consecutive road loss to the Steelers.

==== Week 2: vs. New Orleans Saints ====
Week Two: New Orleans Saints at Cleveland Browns – Game summary

Quarter	1	2	3	4	Total
Saints	0	10	7	7	**24**
**Browns**	10	6	7	3	**26**

at FirstEnergy Stadium, Cleveland, Ohio

- Date: September 14
- Game time: 1:00 pm. EDT
- Game weather: 63 °F or 17.2 °C, (Cloudy)
- Game attendance: 67,407
- Referee: Craig Wrolstad
- TV announcers (Fox): Kenny Albert, Daryl Johnston and Tony Siragusa
- Recap, Gamebook

Game information

First quarter

- CLE (5:59) - Miles Austin 3 yd pass from Brian Hoyer (Billy Cundiff kick)
  **Browns 7, Saints 0** Drive: 9 plays, 51 yds, 3:36
- CLE (0:00) - Billy Cundiff 32 yd field goal
  **Browns 10, Saints 0** Drive: 11 plays, 44 yds, 3:31

Second quarter

- NO (5:16) - Shayne Graham 27 yd field goal
  **Browns 10, Saints 3** Drive: 7 plays, 73 yds, 3:28
- CLE (3:25) - Tashaun Gipson 62 yd interception return (2 pt conversion failed)
  **Browns 16, Saints 3**
- NO (0:03) - Jimmy Graham 9 yd pass from Drew Brees (Shayne Graham kick)
  **Browns 16, Saints 10** Drive: 12 plays, 85 yds, 3:22

Third quarter

- NO (9:32) - Jimmy Graham 1 yd pass from Drew Brees (Shayne Graham kick)
  **Saints 17, Browns 16** Drive: 8 plays, 57 yds, 3:17
- CLE (3:19) - Terrance West 9 yd run (Billy Cundiff kick)
  **Browns 23, Saints 17** Drive: 14 plays, 80 yds, 6:13

Fourth quarter

- NO (12:12) - Mark Ingram II 1 yd run (Shayne Graham kick)
  **Saints 24, Browns 23** Drive: 13 plays, 80 yds, 6:07
- CLE (0:03) - Billy Cundiff 29 yd field goal
  **Browns 26, Saints 23** Drive: 14 plays, 85 yds, 2:43

Top passers

- NO – Drew Brees - 27/40, 237 yds, 2 TD, 1 INT
- CLE – Brian Hoyer - 24/40, 204 yds, 1 TD

Top rushers

- NO – Mark Ingram II - 11 carr, 83 yds, 1 TD
- CLE – Terrance West - 19 carr, 68 yds, 1 TD

Top receivers

- NO – Jimmy Graham - 10 rec, 118 yds, 2 TD
- CLE – Andrew Hawkins - 6 rec, 70 yds

Top defenders

- NO – David Hawthorne - 9 tackles
- CLE – Tashaun Gipson - 8 tackles, 1 INT, 1 TD

This was the Browns' first home opener win since 2004, and also marked Johnny Manziel's NFL debut. Rookie Terrence West, who had more than 2,500 all-purpose yards at Division I (FCS) Towson University, ran for 68 yards and one touchdown. Billy Cundiff hit the game-winning field goal as time expired.

==== Week 3: vs. Baltimore Ravens ====
Week Three: Baltimore Ravens at Cleveland Browns – Game summary

Quarter	1	2	3	4	Total
**Ravens**	3	7	7	6	**23**
Browns	7	0	14	0	**21**

at FirstEnergy Stadium, Cleveland, Ohio

- Date: September 21
- Game time: 1:00 pm. EDT
- Game weather: 70 °F or 21.1 °C, (Sunny)
- Game attendance: 67,407
- Referee: Bill Leavy
- TV announcers (CBS): Spero Dedes and Solomon Wilcots
- Recap, Gamebook

Game information

First quarter

- BAL (9:11) - Justin Tucker 38 yd field goal
  **Ravens 3, Browns 0** Drive: 12 plays, 55 yds, 5:49
- CLE (3:13) - Terrance West 1 yd run (Billy Cundiff kick)
  **Browns 7, Ravens 3** Drive: 11 plays, 80 yds, 5:56

Second quarter

- BAL (7:24) - Kyle Juszczyk 9 yd pass from Joe Flacco (Justin Tucker kick)
  **Ravens 10, Browns 7** Drive: 10 plays, 80 yds, 6:05

Third quarter

- CLE (10:01) - Isaiah Crowell 14 yd run (Billy Cundiff kick)
  **Browns 14, Ravens 10** Drive: 9 plays, 80 yds, 4:59
- BAL (5:04) - Lorenzo Taliaferro 1 yd run (Justin Tucker kick)
  **Ravens 17, Browns 14** Drive: 8 plays, 80 yds, 4:57
- CLE (0:13) - Miles Austin 4 yd pass from Brian Hoyer (Billy Cundiff kick)
  **Browns 21, Ravens 17** Drive: 10 plays, 80 yds, 4:51

Fourth quarter

- BAL (5:00) - Justin Tucker 21 yd field goal
  **Browns 21, Ravens 20** Drive: 8 plays, 71 yds, 2:42
- BAL (0:00) - Justin Tucker 32 yd field goal
  **Ravens 23, Browns 21** Drive: 6 plays, 37 yds, 1:58

Top passers

- BAL – Joe Flacco - 19/31, 217 yds, 1 TD, 1 INT
- CLE – Brian Hoyer - 19/25, 290 yds, 1 TD

Top rushers

- BAL – Lorenzo Taliaferro - 18 carr, 91 yds, 1 TD
- CLE – Isaiah Crowell - 11 carr, 55 yds

Top receivers

- BAL – Steve Smith Sr. - 5 rec, 101 yds
- CLE – Andrew Hawkins - 7 rec, 87 yds

Top defenders

- BAL – Jimmy Smith - 6 tackles
- CLE – Tashaun Gipson - 5 tackles, 1 INT

For the Browns, this would mark the third straight regular season game that they played in: that would be decided by 3 or fewer points, and that would have a game-winning field goal in the final ten seconds of the fourth quarter. In a tightly contested match, the Browns led 21–17 heading into the fourth. A series of errors (including a missed 50-yard field goal try and a blocked field goal attempt) prevented them from scoring, while the Ravens scored 6 unanswered. Throughout the first three periods, the Browns were 5/7 on third down conversions; they were 0/4 on third down conversions and gained only one first down in the decisive fourth quarter. Ravens K Justin Tucker kicked the game-winning field goal as time expired. With the loss, the Browns suffered their first home loss of the season as their record fell to 1–2 entering the bye week. The Browns also fell to 1–12 against the Ravens with Joe Flacco as the QB under center. Victories by the Bengals and the Steelers would leave the Browns in sole possession of last place in the AFC North.

The Browns were the only team in the NFL not to have a turnover in the first three games of the season.

==== Week 5: at Tennessee Titans ====
Week Five: Cleveland Browns at Tennessee Titans – Game summary

Quarter	1	2	3	4	Total
**Browns**	0	10	3	16	**29**
Titans	7	21	0	0	**28**

at LP Field, Nashville, Tennessee

- Date: October 5
- Game time: 1:00 pm. EDT/12:00 p.m. CDT
- Game weather: 67 °F (19.4 °C), partly sunny
- Game attendance: 69,143
- Referee: Gene Steratore
- TV announcers (CBS): Andrew Catalon, Steve Beuerlein and Steve Tasker
- Recap, Gamebook

Game information

First quarter

- TEN (4:46) - Kendall Wright 11 yd pass from Jake Locker (Ryan Succop kick)
  **Titans 7, Browns 0** Drive: 7 plays, 58 yds, 3:51

Second quarter

- TEN (14:49) - Jake Locker 11 yd run (Ryan Succop kick)
  **Titans 14, Browns 0** Drive: 7 plays, 80 yds, 3:19
- CLE (10:05) - Billy Cundiff 38 yd field goal
  **Titans 14, Browns 3** Drive: 12 plays, 66 yds, 4:36
- TEN (3:43) - Kendall Wright 11 yd pass from Charlie Whitehurst (Ryan Succop kick)
  **Titans 21, Browns 3** Drive: 13 plays, 80 yds, 6:22
- TEN (2:44) - Justin Hunter 75 yd pass from Charlie Whitehurst (Ryan Succop kick)
  **Titans 28, Browns 3** Drive: 1 play, 75 yds, 0:11
- CLE (0:12) - Jim Dray 1 yd pass from Brian Hoyer (Billy Cundiff kick)
  **Titans 28, Browns 10** Drive: 9 plays, 90 yds, 2:32

Third quarter

- CLE (12:55) - Billy Cundiff 42 yd field goal
  **Titans 28, Browns 13** Drive: 5 plays, 56 yds, 2:05

Fourth quarter

- CLE (11:02) - Tank Carder blocked punt out of end zone
  **Titans 28, Browns 15**
- CLE (6:49) - Travis Benjamin 17 yd pass from Brian Hoyer (Billy Cundiff kick)
  **Titans 28, Browns 22** Drive: 10 plays, 67 yds, 4:13
- CLE (1:09) - Travis Benjamin 6 yd pass from Brian Hoyer (Billy Cundiff kick)
  **Browns 29, Titans 28** Drive: 4 plays, 42 yds, 1:54

Top passers

- CLE – Brian Hoyer - 21/37, 292 yds, 3 TD, 1 INT
- TEN – Charlie Whitehurst - 13/21, 194 yds, 2 TD

Top rushers

- CLE – Ben Tate - 22 carr, 123 yds
- TEN – Kendall Wright - 2 carr, 43 yds

Top receivers

- CLE – Taylor Gabriel - 4 rec, 95 yds
- TEN – Justin Hunter - 3 rec, 99 yds, 1 TD

Top defenders

- CLE – Karlos Dansby - 8 tackles
- TEN – Michael Griffin - 14 tackles, 1 sack

This marked the Browns' solitary game outside the Eastern time zone during the 2014 season. The Browns ended a 7-game away losing streak and improved to 2–2 with the win. For the fourth time this season, the Browns participated in a game that was decided by 3 or fewer points. It was also the fourth time in as many games that the winning score was produced with less than 2 minutes to go in the 4th quarter. The game was aggressive, with 14 penalties for 142 yards, and the ejection of the Titans' linebacker Derrick Morgan. The Titans dominated in the early minutes, scoring the first 14 points of the contest and leaping out to a 28–3 lead. Despite trailing by as many as 25 points in the second quarter, the Browns scored the final 26 points of the game while the Titans failed to score any points in the second half. Travis Benjamin caught the game-winning TD pass from Brian Hoyer with 69 seconds left in the game.

The Browns' 25-point rally represented the largest comeback in franchise history and the largest comeback by a road team in NFL history. For his outstanding play on punt and kick coverage, Browns DL Tank Carder was recognized as the AFC Special Teams Player of the Week.

==== Week 6: vs. Pittsburgh Steelers ====
Week Six: Pittsburgh Steelers at Cleveland Browns – Game summary

Quarter	1	2	3	4	Total
Steelers	3	0	0	7	**10**
**Browns**	0	21	3	7	**31**

at FirstEnergy Stadium, Cleveland, Ohio

- Date: October 12
- Game time: 1:00 pm. EDT
- Game weather: 64 °F or 17.8 °C, (Sunny)
- Game attendance: 67,431
- Referee: Pete Morelli
- TV announcers (CBS): Greg Gumbel, Trent Green and Evan Washburn
- Recap, Gamebook

Game information

First quarter

- PIT (5:09) - Shaun Suisham 20 yd field goal
  **Steelers 3, Browns 0** Drive: 10 plays, 63 yds, 6:11

Second quarter

- CLE (11:45) - Isaiah Crowell 5 yd run (Billy Cundiff kick)
  **Browns 7, Steelers 3** Drive: 5 plays, 68 yds, 1:51
- CLE (9:35) - Jordan Cameron 51 yd pass from Brian Hoyer (Billy Cundiff kick)
  **Browns 14, Steelers 3** Drive: 3 plays, 60 yds, 1:08
- CLE (2:27) - Ben Tate 8 yd run (Billy Cundiff kick)
  **Browns 21, Steelers 3** Drive: 11 plays, 85 yds, 5:07

Third quarter

- CLE (3:23) - Billy Cundiff 40 yd field goal
  **Browns 24, Steelers 3** Drive: 6 plays, 58 yds, 2:52

Fourth quarter

- CLE (12:47) - Ben Tate 1 yd run (Billy Cundiff kick)
  **Browns 31, Steelers 3** Drive: 7 plays, 39 yds, 4:17
- PIT (2:36) - Lance Moore 26 yd pass from Ben Roethlisberger (Shaun Suisham kick)
  **Browns 31, Steelers 10** Drive: 5 plays, 74 yds, 1:03

Top passers

- PIT – Ben Roethlisberger - 21/42, 228 yds, 1 TD, 1 INT
- CLE – Brian Hoyer - 8/17, 217 yds, 1 TD

Top rushers

- PIT – Le'Veon Bell - 18 carr, 82 yds
- CLE – Ben Tate - 25 carr, 78 yds, 2 TD

Top receivers

- PIT – Antonio Brown - 7 rec, 118 yds
- CLE – Jordan Cameron - 3 rec, 102 yds, 1 TD

Top defenders

- PIT – Lawrence Timmons - 10 tackles
- CLE – Karlos Dansby - 11 tackles, 1 sack

This was the second and final regular season meeting between the two teams. The Browns snapped a four-game losing streak to the Steelers with a 31–10 blowout victory. They also won their first divisional game of the season, ending a five-game losing streak to division foes. The Steelers led 3–0 after the first quarter. However, the Browns scored 21 straight points in the second quarter, building a 21–3 halftime lead. Adding a field goal in the third quarter and a touchdown in the fourth, the Browns created an insurmountable 31–3 lead. The Steelers’ late touchdown in the fourth quarter produced the final score. Steelers’ QB Ben Roethlisberger suffered only his second career loss in 20 career games against the Browns. For Cleveland, the 21-point margin of victory was the most lopsided win over Pittsburgh since they routed them 51–0 in a Week 1 matchup during the 1989 season. The Browns moved into third place in the AFC North with a 3–2 record while the Steelers fell into fourth place with a 3–3 record.

==== Week 7: at Jacksonville Jaguars ====
Week Seven: Cleveland Browns at Jacksonville Jaguars – Game summary

Quarter	1	2	3	4	Total
Browns	3	3	0	0	**6**
**Jaguars**	0	7	3	14	**24**

at EverBank Field, Jacksonville, Florida

- Date: October 19
- Game time: 1:00 pm. EDT
- Game weather: 76 °F (24.4 °C), sunny
- Game attendance: 61,341
- Referee: Tony Corrente
- TV announcers (CBS): Andrew Catalon, Steve Beuerlein and Steve Tasker
- Recap, Gamebook

Game information

First quarter

- CLE (6:30) - Billy Cundiff 40 yd field goal
  **Browns 3, Jaguars 0** Drive: 4 plays, -5 yds, 1:22

Second quarter

- CLE (4:16) - Billy Cundiff 22 yd field goal
  **Browns 6, Jaguars 0** Drive: 14 plays, 76 yds, 5:21
- JAX (0:27) - Allen Robinson 31 yd pass from Blake Bortles (Josh Scobee kick)
  **Jaguars 7, Browns 6** Drive: 3 plays, 76 yds, 1:06

Third quarter

- JAX (10:00) - Josh Scobee 30 yd field goal
  **Jaguars 10, Browns 6** Drive: 7 plays, 13 yds, 2:08

Fourth quarter

- JAX (5:58) - Denard Robinson 8 yd run (Josh Scobee kick)
  **Jaguars 17, Browns 6** Drive: 1 play, 8 yds, 0:03
- JAX (4:35) - Storm Johnson 3 yd run (Josh Scobee kick)
  **Jaguars 24, Browns 6** Drive: 2 plays, 7 yds, 0:37

Top passers

- CLE – Brian Hoyer - 16/41, 215 yds, 1 INT
- JAX – Blake Bortles - 17/31, 159 yds, 1 TD, 3 INT

Top rushers

- CLE – Ben Tate - 16 carr, 36 yds
- JAX – Denard Robinson - 22 carr, 127 yds, 1 TD

Top receivers

- CLE – Andrew Hawkins - 5 rec, 112 yds
- JAX – Allen Robinson - 4 rec, 60 yds, 1 TD

Top defenders

- CLE – Tashaun Gipson - 4 tackles, 2 INT
- JAX – Paul Posluszny - 12 tackles, 1 sack

The Browns entered this game with a 3–2 record, coming off a blowout victory over the Steelers and were looking to win their third consecutive game. Meanwhile, the Jaguars entered with a 0–6 record, and a 9-game losing streak, coming off a tough loss to the Tennessee Titans. Despite being heavy favorites to win this matchup, the Browns were routed 24–6. The Browns led 6–0 late in the first half and had the opportunity to kick a field goal and go up 9–0. Instead, Browns HC Mike Pettine opted to go for it on 4th & 1. The conversion attempt failed, and within seconds, the Jaguars scored a touchdown to close out the half, leading 7–6. Following a lost fumble by Brian Hoyer, the Jaguars added a field goal to make it 10–6. In the fourth, the Browns finally imploded. KR Jordan Poyer attempted to catch the punt at the Browns' 2-yard line; the ball went off his facemask, and the Jaguars recovered, scoring a touchdown on their next drive to make it 17–6. On the Browns' next drive, Hoyer threw an interception and the Jags converted another touchdown a few seconds later, making the final score 24–6. After committing only 2 turnovers in their first 5 games, the Browns committed 3 turnovers against the Jaguars. 17 of the Jaguars’ 24 points came off turnovers. The defense picked off Blake Bortles three times, but they were able to score only 3 points off of those turnovers. Hoyer struggled mightily throughout the game, going 16/41 for 215 yards, 0 touchdowns, an interception, and a lost fumble. It was the Browns' lowest scoring output of the season and the fewest points that they had scored with Hoyer as their starting quarterback. It was the first time that the Browns had failed to score a touchdown in a game since Week 2 against the Ravens (in the 2013 season). It was also the first time that the Browns failed to score any points in the second half (it last occurred in Week 2 of the 2013 season when the Browns were outscored by the Ravens 14–0 in the second half). The Jaguars won their first game of the season to improve to 1–6; The Browns' record dropped to 3–3 as they fell to 4th place in the AFC North.

==== Week 8: vs. Oakland Raiders ====
Week Eight: Oakland Raiders at Cleveland Browns – Game summary

Quarter	1	2	3	4	Total
Raiders	0	6	0	7	**13**
**Browns**	6	3	0	14	**23**

at FirstEnergy Stadium, Cleveland, Ohio

- Date: October 26
- Game time: 4:25 pm. EDT
- Game weather: 55 °F or 12.8 °C, (Sunny)
- Game attendance: 67,431
- Referee: Ron Torbert
- TV announcers (CBS): Spero Dedes and Solomon Wilcots
- Recap, Gamebook

Game information

First quarter

- CLE (9:54) - Billy Cundiff 52 yd field goal
  **Browns 3, Raiders 0** Drive: 5 plays, 14 yds, 1:06
- CLE (2:28) - Billy Cundiff 33 yd field goal
  **Browns 6, Raiders 0** Drive: 8 plays, 56 yds, 4:23

Second quarter

- CLE (5:46) - Billy Cundiff 26 yd field goal
  **Browns 9, Raiders 0** Drive: 11 plays, 78 yds, 5:14
- OAK (1:50) - Sebastian Janikowski 46 yd field goal
  **Browns 9, Raiders 3** Drive: 9 plays, 53 yds, 3:56
- OAK (0:00) - Sebastian Janikowski 38 yd field goal
  **Browns 9, Raiders 6** Drive: 6 plays, 43 yds, 1:22

Third quarter

- No scoring

Fourth quarter

- CLE (14:17) - Andrew Hawkins 4 yd pass from Brian Hoyer (Billy Cundiff kick)
  **Browns 16, Raiders 6** Drive: 4 plays, 53 yds, 1:06
- CLE (2:26) - Ben Tate 5 yd run (Billy Cundiff kick)
  **Browns 23, Raiders 6** Drive: 2 plays, 9 yds, 0:47
- OAK (0:07) - Andre Holmes 10 yd pass from Derek Carr (Sebastian Janikowski kick)
  **Browns 23, Raiders 13** Drive: 17 plays, 80 yds, 2:19

Top passers

- OAK – Derek Carr - 34/54, 328 yds, 1 TD
- CLE – Brian Hoyer - 19/28, 275 yds, 1 TD

Top rushers

- OAK – Darren McFadden - 12 carr, 59 yds
- CLE – Ben Tate - 15 carr, 26 yds, 1 TD

Top receivers

- OAK – Mychal Rivera - 7 rec, 83 yds
- CLE – Andrew Hawkins - 7 rec, 88 yds, 1 TD

Top defenders

- OAK – Sio Moore - 9 tackles
- CLE – Paul Kruger - 5 tackles, 3 sacks

After suffering a disappointing loss to the previously winless Jaguars the week before, the Browns faced yet another winless opponent in the Oakland Raiders. Both teams struggled for much of the game, kicking a combined five field goals as the Browns held a 9–6-second half lead. At the end of the third quarter the Browns finally got the break they needed when S Joe Haden recovered a Darren McFadden fumble deep in Cleveland territory and returned it 34 yards. Four plays later, QB Brian Hoyer found WR Andrew Hawkins for a four-yard touchdown pass and a 16–6 lead. The Raiders would never recover and the Browns, despite giving up the Raiders’ lone touchdown pass from Derek Carr to Andre Holmes with 7 seconds left, won the game 23–13.

==== Week 9: vs. Tampa Bay Buccaneers ====
Week Nine: Tampa Bay Buccaneers at Cleveland Browns – Game summary

Quarter	1	2	3	4	Total
Buccaneers	0	10	7	0	**17**
**Browns**	3	6	7	6	**22**

at FirstEnergy Stadium, Cleveland, Ohio

- Date: November 2
- Game time: 1:00 pm. EST
- Game weather: 42 °F (5.6 °C), cloudy
- Game attendance: 67,431
- Referee: Terry McAulay
- TV announcers (Fox): Thom Brennaman, David Diehl and Laura Okmin
- Recap, Gamebook

Game information

First quarter

- CLE (5:59) - Billy Cundiff 49 yd field goal
  **Browns 3, Buccaneers 0** Drive: 8 plays, 46 yds, 3:44

Second quarter

- CLE (13:34) - Billy Cundiff 29 yd field goal
  **Browns 6, Buccaneers 0** Drive: 5 plays, 10 yds, 1:43
- TB (8:44) - Mike Evans 24 yd pass from Mike Glennon (Patrick Murray kick)
  **Buccaneers 7, Browns 6** Drive: 8 plays, 80 yds, 4:50
- TB (2:25) - Patrick Murray 40 yd field goal
  **Buccaneers 10, Browns 6** Drive: 7 plays, 42 yds, 3:48
- CLE (0:00) - Billy Cundiff 43 yd field goal
  **Buccaneers 10, Browns 9** Drive: 8 plays, 54 yds, 2:25

Third quarter

- CLE (9:10) - Terrance West 2 yd pass from Brian Hoyer (Billy Cundiff kick)
  **Browns 16, Buccaneers 10** Drive: 11 plays, 80 yds, 5:50
- TB (2:49) - Mike Evans 24 yd pass from Mike Glennon (Patrick Murray kick)
  **Buccaneers 17, Browns 16** Drive: 3 plays, 45 yds, 1:13

Fourth quarter

- CLE (8:59) - Taylor Gabriel 34 yd pass from Brian Hoyer (2 pt conversion failed)
  **Browns 22, Buccaneers 17** Drive: 2 plays, 35 yds, 0:43

Top passers

- TB – Mike Glennon - 17/33, 260 yds, 2 TD, 2 INT
- CLE – Brian Hoyer - 21/34, 300 yds, 2 TD, 2 INT

Top rushers

- TB – Bobby Rainey - 19 carr, 87 yds
- CLE – Terrance West - 15 carr, 48 yds

Top receivers

- TB – Mike Evans - 7 rec, 124 yds, 2 TD
- CLE – Taylor Gabriel - 5 rec, 87 yds, 1 TD

Top defenders

- TB – Major Wright - 13 tackles
- CLE – Donte Whitner - 8 tackles, 1 INT

Rookie WR Mike Evans, a teammate of Johnny Manziel at Texas A&M and the recipient of more than 200 catches in 2 years, was the favorite target for QB Mike Glennon, scoring both of Tampa Bay's TDs in the game. Patrick Murray added a field goal but missed three others. Cleveland blocked Murray's first FG attempt, tipped a punt that gained only 12 yards, got 2 interceptions and a fumble recovery, and kept the Bucs out of the end zone in the fourth quarter. QB Brian Hoyer passed for 300 yards and two touchdowns, with the game-winner to rookie wide receiver Taylor Gabriel.

==== Week 10: at Cincinnati Bengals ====
Week Ten: Cleveland Browns at Cincinnati Bengals – Game summary

Quarter	1	2	3	4	Total
**Browns**	7	10	7	0	**24**
Bengals	3	0	0	0	**3**

at Paul Brown Stadium, Cincinnati, Ohio

- Date: November 6
- Game time: 8:30 pm. EST
- Game weather: 42 °F (5.6 °C), cloudy & windy
- Game attendance: 65,871
- Referee: Jeff Triplette
- TV announcers (NFLN): Jim Nantz, Phil Simms and Tracy Wolfson
- Recap, Gamebook

Game information

First quarter

- CLE (10:40) - Ben Tate 4 yd run (Billy Cundiff kick)
  **Browns 7, Bengals 0** Drive: 5 plays, 18 yds, 2:38
- CIN (6:18) - Mike Nugent 43 yd field goal
  **Browns 7, Bengals 3** Drive: 7 plays, 7 yds, 1:22

Second quarter

- CLE (12:57) - Isaiah Crowell 2 yd run (Billy Cundiff kick)
  **Browns 14, Bengals 3** Drive: 8 plays, 59 yds, 4:01
- CLE (3:59) - Billy Cundiff 32 yd field goal
  **Browns 17, Bengals 3** Drive: 14 plays, 63 yds, 5:56

Third quarter

- CLE (4:46) - Terrance West 1 yd run (Billy Cundiff kick)
  **Browns 24, Bengals 3** Drive: 10 plays, 63 yds, 5:30

Fourth quarter

- No scoring

Top passers

- CLE – Brian Hoyer - 15/23, 198 yds
- CIN – Andy Dalton - 10/33, 86 yds, 3 INT

Top rushers

- CLE – Terrance West - 26 carr, 94 yds, 1 TD
- CIN – Jeremy Hill - 12 carr, 55 yds

Top receivers

- CLE – Miles Austin - 5 rec, 48 yds
- CIN – Jermaine Gresham - 3 rec, 29 yds

Top defenders

- CLE – Buster Skrine - 3 tackles, 2 INT
- CIN – Emmanuel Lamur - 11 tackles

This was the 82nd meeting between the teams in the "Battle of Ohio." The Browns' defense suffocated the Bengals, forcing four turnovers while limiting the Bengals’ offense to 3 points and surrendering only one red zone drive. Bengals QB Andy Dalton struggled severely, going 10/33 for 86 yards while throwing 3 interceptions, and being sacked twice on consecutive plays by DT Desmond Bryant. His final passer rating was 2.0, the lowest in Bengals team history. Cleveland found its sea legs using the "running back by committee" approach, with all three of its starting rushers (Ben Tate, Terrence West, and Isiah Crowell) scoring TDs in compiling 170 yds on the ground. The Bengals lost their first regular season home game since Week 14 of the 2012 season (against the Cowboys). The 21-point loss represented the Bengals’ most lopsided defeat since the Ravens routed them by 31 points in Week 13 of the 2008 season. For the Browns, their 21-point victory marked their largest road margin since the 1993 season (when the Browns beat the L.A. Rams by 28 points), won multiple road games in a season for the first time since 2010, snapped a 5-game road losing streak to the Bengals and a 17-game road losing streak to division foes (both of which began in 2008). The Browns' 6–3 record is the franchise's best 9-game start since returning to the league in 1999, and their best start since the 1994 season when the Browns opened the season with a 7–2 record.

With the convincing win, the Browns improved to 6–3. This marked the Browns' best 9-game start to a season since 1994, when they started 7–2. After the Steelers lost the following Sunday, the Browns held sole possession of first place in the AFC North, the first (until 2026) time the Browns solely led a division since 1995.

==== Week 11: vs. Houston Texans ====
Week Eleven: Houston Texans at Cleveland Browns – Game summary

Quarter	1	2	3	4	Total
**Texans**	7	7	3	6	**23**
Browns	0	7	0	0	**7**

at FirstEnergy Stadium, Cleveland, Ohio

- Date: November 16
- Game time: 1:00 pm. EST
- Game weather: 35 °F or 1.7 °C, (Light Snow)
- Game attendance: 67,431
- Referee: Ed Hochuli
- TV announcers (CBS): Andrew Catalon, Steve Beuerlein and Steve Tasker
- Recap, Gamebook

Game information

First quarter

- HOU (7:09) - J. J. Watt 2 yd pass from Ryan Mallett (Randy Bullock kick)
  **Texans 7, Browns 0** Drive: 12 plays, 89 yds, 4:47

Second quarter

- CLE (8:58) - Andrew Hawkins 32 yd pass from Brian Hoyer (Billy Cundiff kick)
  **Texans 7, Browns 7** Drive: 7 plays, 62 yds, 2:38
- HOU (0:23) - Garrett Graham 20 yd pass from Ryan Mallett (Randy Bullock kick)
  **Texans 14, Browns 7** Drive: 9 plays, 78 yds, 2:43

Third quarter

- HOU (5:16) - Randy Bullock 46 yd field goal
  **Texans 17, Browns 7** Drive: 10 plays, 60 yds, 2:40

Fourth quarter

- HOU (9:47) - Randy Bullock 37 yd field goal
  **Texans 20, Browns 7** Drive: 13 plays, 38 yds, 5:28
- HOU (2:47) - Randy Bullock 50 yd field goal
  **Texans 23, Browns 7** Drive: 6 plays, 40 yds, 1:14

Top passers

- HOU – Ryan Mallett - 20/30, 211 yds, 2 TD, 1 INT
- CLE – Brian Hoyer - 20/50, 330 yds, 1 TD, 1 INT

Top rushers

- HOU – Alfred Blue - 36 carr, 156 yds
- CLE – Isaiah Crowell - 14 carr, 61 yds

Top receivers

- HOU – DeAndre Hopkins - 4 rec, 80 yds
- CLE – Andrew Hawkins - 6 rec, 97 yds, 1 TD

Top defenders

- HOU – A. J. Bouye - 10 tackles
- CLE – Joe Haden - 13 tackles

This marked the first of four games against potential playoff-bound teams in the Texans, Atlanta Falcons, Buffalo Bills, and Indianapolis Colts. The Browns saw their three-game winning streak end as the Texans’ defense and run game dominated the Browns in a 23–7 blowout loss. Texans DE J. J. Watt, who played tight end in high school, scored the 5th offensive TD of his career. The Browns' lone score came in the 2nd quarter. A touchdown from Brian Hoyer to Browns' receiver Andrew Hawkins tied the game at 7 in the second quarter. However, the Texans scored the final 16 points of the contest. Hoyer struggled as he was 20/50 passing for 330 yards, throwing only one touchdown while throwing a 4th quarter interception. It was only the second time this season that the Browns got shut out in the second half of a game, an event that also occurred in their 24–6 loss to the Jaguars. With the loss, the Browns fell out of 1st place in the AFC North and into a tie for 3rd place behind the Bengals and Steelers, who both won that week.

Defensive linemen John Hughes and Phil Taylor were lost for the season on IR, and Jordan Cameron missed his 3rd straight game due to a concussion. On November 18, the Browns released RB Ben Tate.

This game started a stretch that lasted until the end of the 2017 season where the Browns would win only five of their next 55 games.

==== Week 12: at Atlanta Falcons ====
Week Twelve: Cleveland Browns at Atlanta Falcons – Game summary

Quarter	1	2	3	4	Total
**Browns**	7	6	10	3	**26**
Falcons	7	7	0	10	**24**

at Georgia Dome, Atlanta, Georgia

- Date: November 23
- Game time: 1:00 pm. EST
- Game weather: Played indoors (domed stadium)
- Game attendance: 70,046
- Referee: Brad Allen
- TV announcers (CBS): Andrew Catalon, Steve Beuerlein and Steve Tasker
- Recap, Gamebook

Game information

First quarter

- ATL (5:53) - Julio Jones 24 yd pass from Matt Ryan (Matt Bryant kick)
  **Falcons 7, Browns 0** Drive: 10 plays, 57 yds, 4:26
- CLE (1:33) - Isaiah Crowell 11 yd run (Billy Cundiff kick)
  **Falcons 7, Browns 7** Drive: 10 plays, 80 yds, 4:20

Second quarter

- CLE (13:17) - Billy Cundiff 33 yd field goal
  **Browns 10, Falcons 7** Drive: 6 plays, 14 yds, 1:37
- CLE (9:20) - Billy Cundiff 37 yd field goal
  **Browns 13, Falcons 7** Drive: 5 plays, 21 yds, 1:55
- ATL (0:55) - Jacquizz Rodgers 8 yd pass from Matt Ryan (Matt Bryant kick)
  **Falcons 14, Browns 13** Drive: 7 plays, 50 yds, 1:57

Third quarter

- CLE (9:46) - Billy Cundiff 32 yd field goal
  **Browns 16, Falcons 14** Drive: 11 plays, 66 yds, 5:14
- CLE (0:46) - Isaiah Crowell 26 yd run (Billy Cundiff kick)
  **Browns 23, Falcons 14** Drive: 9 plays, 70 yds, 4:58

Fourth quarter

- ATL (9:31) - Steven Jackson 1 yd run (Matt Bryant kick)
  **Browns 23, Falcons 21** Drive: 14 plays, 80 yds, 6:15
- ATL (0:44) - Matt Bryant 53 yd field goal
  **Falcons 24, Browns 23** Drive: 7 plays, 20 yds, 1:58
- CLE (0:00) - Billy Cundiff 37 yd field goal
  **Browns 26, Falcons 24** Drive: 7 plays, 61 yds, 0:44

Top passers

- CLE – Brian Hoyer - 23/40, 322 yds, 3 INT
- ATL – Matt Ryan - 27/43, 273 yds, 2 TD, 1 INT

Top rushers

- CLE – Isaiah Crowell - 12 carr, 88 yds, 2 TD
- ATL – Steven Jackson - 13 carr, 34 yds, 1 TD

Top receivers

- CLE – Josh Gordon - 8 rec, 120 yds
- ATL – Roddy White - 9 rec, 96 yds

Top defenders

- CLE – Craig Robertson - 9 tackles
- ATL – Kemal Ishmael - 11 tackles, 1 INT

This was WR Josh Gordon's first action, back from his 10-game suspension. He led all receivers with 120 total yards. Down 24–23 with 44 seconds left, Hoyer, who had 3 interceptions and 0 touchdowns, drove the ball 61 yards including the key pass to Gordon inside the 35-yard line, setting up Billy Cundiff's 2nd game-winning field goal of the season with 5 seconds left for a 26–24 victory.

With the win, the Browns improved to 7–4. The Browns won consecutive road games for the first time since 2008 and Hoyer became the first Browns quarterback since Brian Sipe in 1980 to record consecutive 300+ yd games. S Tashaun Gipson left the game in the fourth quarter after colliding with CB Joe Haden and suffering a serious knee injury on the play. Gipson would miss the rest of the regular season.

==== Week 13: at Buffalo Bills ====
Week Thirteen: Cleveland Browns at Buffalo Bills – Game summary

Quarter	1	2	3	4	Total
Browns	3	0	0	7	**10**
**Bills**	0	0	14	12	**26**

at Ralph Wilson Stadium, Orchard Park, New York

- Date: November 30
- Game time: 1:00 pm. EST
- Game weather: 57 °F (13.9 °C), cloudy
- Game attendance: 68,576
- Referee: Jerome Boger
- TV announcers (CBS): Greg Gumbel, Trent Green and Evan Washburn
- Recap, Gamebook

Game information

First quarter

- CLE (4:51) - Billy Cundiff 22 yd field goal
  **Browns 3, Bills 0** Drive: 15 plays, 91 yds, 6:03

Second quarter

- No scoring

Third quarter

- BUF (8:04) - Chris Hogan 3 yd pass from Kyle Orton (Dan Carpenter kick)
  **Bills 7, Browns 3** Drive: 8 plays, 84 yds, 4:09
- BUF (7:54) - Jerry Hughes 18 yd fumble recovery (Dan Carpenter kick)
  **Bills 14, Browns 3**

Fourth quarter

- BUF (13:41) - Dan Carpenter 49 yd field goal
  **Bills 17, Browns 3** Drive: 6 plays, 17 yds, 3:01
- BUF (12:01) - Dan Carpenter 34 yd field goal
  **Bills 20, Browns 3** Drive: 4 plays, 5 yds, 0:58
- CLE (8:47) - Johnny Manziel 10 yd run (Billy Cundiff kick)
  **Bills 20, Browns 10** Drive: 8 plays, 80 yds, 3:14
- BUF (3:32) - Dan Carpenter 34 yd field goal
  **Bills 23, Browns 10** Drive: 10 plays, 64 yds, 5:15
- BUF (0:27) - Dan Carpenter 35 yd field goal
  **Bills 26, Browns 10** Drive: 4 plays, 6 yds, 2:16

Top passers

- CLE – Brian Hoyer - 18/30, 192 yds, 2 INT
- BUF – Kyle Orton - 17/31, 190 yds, 1 TD, 2 INT

Top rushers

- CLE – Terrance West - 7 carr, 32 yds
- BUF – Fred Jackson - 21 carr, 70 yds

Top receivers

- CLE – Miles Austin - 7 rec, 86 yds
- BUF – Robert Woods - 4 rec, 71 yds

Top defenders

- CLE – Craig Robertson - 11 tackles
- BUF – Da'Norris Searcy - 4 tackles, 2 INT

The Bills’ defense dominated the Browns in a 26–10 defeat. The first half was low scoring; K Billy Cundiff made a 22-yard field goal for a 3–0 lead. Several special teams errors occurred in the second quarter that prevented either team from scoring. Cundiff missed a field goal and the Bills’ K Dan Carpenter's 53-yard field goal try was blocked by S Joe Haden. The Bills dominated the second half, scoring 20 unanswered points to seize control. The Bills scored a touchdown early in the third to go up 7–3. On the Browns' next drive, RB Terrance West fumbled, and the Bills recovered for a touchdown, adding a field goal in the 4th quarter to make it 17–3. Hoyer threw an INT on the next drive, and the Bills kicked another field goal, building a 20–3 lead. At that moment, Hoyer was benched for Johnny Manziel for the remainder of the game. Manziel led an 80-yard touchdown drive on his first series, running for a touchdown to cut the deficit to 20–10. On Manziel's second drive, the Browns failed to gain a first down, turning the ball over on downs. The Bills kicked 2 more field goals to make it 26–10, producing the final margin.

With the loss, the Browns fell to 7–5.

On December 3, head coach Mike Pettine announced that Hoyer would start the Browns' next game against the Indianapolis Colts.

==== Week 14: vs. Indianapolis Colts ====
Week Fourteen: Indianapolis Colts at Cleveland Browns – Game summary

Quarter	1	2	3	4	Total
**Colts**	0	7	9	9	**25**
Browns	7	7	7	3	**24**

at FirstEnergy Stadium, Cleveland, Ohio

- Date: December 7
- Game time: 1:00 pm. EST
- Game weather: 36 °F or 2.2 °C, (Sunny)
- Game attendance: 67,431
- Referee: Clete Blakeman
- TV announcers (Fox): Kevin Burkhardt, John Lynch and Pam Oliver
- Recap, Gamebook

Game information

First quarter

- CLE (0:40) - Craig Robertson fumble recovery in end zone (Billy Cundiff kick)
  **Browns 7, Colts 0**

Second quarter

- IND (5:57) - Andrew Luck 11 yd run (Adam Vinatieri kick)
  **Browns 7, Colts 7** Drive: 6 plays, 70 yds, 2:53
- CLE (1:14) - Isaiah Crowell 9 yd run (Billy Cundiff kick)
  **Browns 14, Colts 7** Drive: 9 plays, 77 yds, 4:43

Third quarter

- CLE (10:21) - Justin Gilbert 23 yd interception return (Billy Cundiff kick)
  **Browns 21, Colts 7**
- CLE (7:16) - Adam Vinatieri 51 yd field goal
  **Browns 21, Colts 10** Drive: 7 plays, 31 yds, 3:05
- IND (4:01) - T. Y. Hilton 42 yd pass from Andrew Luck (2 pt conversion failed)
  **Browns 21, Colts 16** Drive: 6 plays, 54 yds, 1:39

Fourth quarter

- IND (14:52) - Adam Vinatieri 33 yd field goal
  **Browns 21, Colts 19** Drive: 8 plays, 37 yds, 2:32
- CLE (8:34) - Billy Cundiff 39 yd field goal
  **Browns 24, Colts 19** Drive: 4 plays, 2 yds, 1:34
- IND (0:32) - T. Y. Hilton 1 yd pass from Andrew Luck (2 pt conversion failed)
  **Colts 25, Browns 24** Drive: 11 plays, 90 yds, 3:14

Top passers

- IND – Andrew Luck - 24/53, 294 yds, 2 TD, 2 INT
- CLE – Brian Hoyer - 14/31, 140 yds, 2 INT

Top rushers

- IND – Andrew Luck - 5 carr, 37 yds, 1 TD
- CLE – Terrance West - 15 carr, 54 yds

Top receivers

- IND – T. Y. Hilton - 10 rec, 150 yds, 2 TD
- CLE – Jordan Cameron - 4 rec, 41 yds

Top defenders

- IND – Jerrell Freeman - 9 tackles
- CLE – Craig Robertson - 12 tackles, fumble recovery, 1 TD

The Colts rallied from a 14-point deficit in the second half to knock off the Browns, 25–24. The defense got off to a fast start right away and dominated for 59 minutes, forcing 4 turnovers in the contest. QB Andrew Luck fumbled on the Colts' 1 yard line, and the ball was recovered in the endzone to make it 7–0. With a chance to go up 10–0, Browns K Billy Cundiff missed a 40 yd. field goal that would later prove to be very costly. Following the miss, Luck rushed for a TD to tie the game at 7–7. On the next drive, Hoyer led the Browns downfield; Rookie RB Isaiah Crowell ran in for a touchdown to lead 14–7 at halftime. In the second half, the Colts' turnover problems continued, committing a fumble on their first drive that the Browns couldn't convert into points. Later in the quarter, Luck threw a "pick-six" to Browns rookie DB Justin Gilbert (his 1st INT of the year), and the Browns went up 21–7. The next two Colts' drives resulted in points (a field goal and a T. Y. Hilton touchdown), cutting the deficit to 21–16 heading into the 4th quarter. Adding another FG in the 4th to make it 21–19, and with a chance to take the lead, Luck threw another interception (he was sacked 3 times). However, the Browns failed to get a first down and were forced to settle for 3, making it 24–19 Browns and leaving the door open for the Colts to take the lead. With less than 4 minutes to go, Luck led a 90-yard game-winning touchdown drive. The Browns had a chance to end the game with a stop on 4th and inches at the 3-yard line, but RB Dan Herron avoided the tackle and picked up 2 yards for a Colts first down. Luck would throw the game-winning TD pass to Hilton on the next play, making it 25–24 Colts with 36 seconds left. After a failed two-point conversion, and with the Browns having one more chance to win the game, Hoyer threw his 2nd INT with less than 10 seconds remaining, and the Colts ran out the clock.

The Browns' offense was barely noticeable throughout the contest. TE Jordan Cameron returned to duty after 5 weeks, leading all Browns receivers with only 41 yds. 17 of the team's 24 points came off of Colts turnovers, the defense converting two into TDs. Punt and kick coverage teams kept returning fan-favorite KR Joshua Cribbs in check, and traded RB Trent Richardson was held to 30 yds. on 7 carries. MLB D'Qwell Jackson had 9 tackles for Indy, but no sacks. In the second half, the Browns' offense failed to convert a single 3rd down (0/6). For the fourth consecutive game, Hoyer was dismal, passing 14/31 for 140 yards, 0 TDs, and 2 INTs (the third straight game that Hoyer had 0 TDs and multiple INTs). It was the second game in a row that the Browns failed to win after holding a halftime lead. It was only the second time that the Browns lost when holding a 4th quarter lead at any point (the other loss coming to the Ravens in Week 3).

With the loss, the Browns fell to 7–6 on the season; wins by the Steelers and Ravens would leave the Browns in 4th place in the AFC North. It was the first time this season that the Browns lost back-to-back games.

On December 9, it was announced that Johnny Manziel would start over the struggling Brian Hoyer. Starting G Ryan Seymour moved to center, replacing Nick McDonald as the team's 4th center to start a game. He finished the season at that position. K Billy Cundiff was released from the team on December 13, replaced by Garrett Hartley.

==== Week 15: vs. Cincinnati Bengals ====
Week Fifteen: Cincinnati Bengals at Cleveland Browns – Game summary

Quarter	1	2	3	4	Total
**Bengals**	10	10	3	7	**30**
Browns	0	0	0	0	**0**

at FirstEnergy Stadium, Cleveland, Ohio

- Date: December 14
- Game time: 1:00 pm. EST
- Game weather: 44 °F or 6.7 °C, (Cloudy)
- Game attendance: 67,431
- Referee: Walt Anderson
- TV announcers (Fox): Kevin Burkhardt, John Lynch and Pam Oliver
- Recap, Gamebook

Game information

First quarter

- CIN (7:53) - Jeremy Hill 2 yd run (Mike Nugent kick)
  **Bengals 7, Browns 0** Drive: 14 plays, 81 yds, 7:07
- CIN (1:57) - Mike Nugent 44 yd field goal
  **Bengals 10, Browns 0** Drive: 9 plays, 46 yds, 3:39

Second quarter

- CIN (13:11) - Jeremy Hill 16 yd run (Mike Nugent kick)
  **Bengals 17, Browns 0** Drive: 5 plays, 36 yds, 1:57
- CIN (10:20) - Mike Nugent 44 yd field goal
  **Bengals 20, Browns 0** Drive: 4 plays, 7 yds, 0:57

Third quarter

- CIN (2:35) - Mike Nugent 34 yd field goal
  **Bengals 23, Browns 0** Drive: 11 plays, 30 yds, 6:39

Fourth quarter

- CIN (0:23) - Rex Burkhead 10 yd run (Mike Nugent kick)
  **Bengals 30, Browns 0** Drive: 14 plays, 86 yds, 8:44

Top passers

- CIN – Andy Dalton - 14/24, 117 yds, 1 INT
- CLE – Johnny Manziel - 10/18, 80 yds, 2 INT

Top rushers

- CIN – Jeremy Hill - 25 carries, 148 yds, 2 TD
- CLE – Terrance West - 5 carries, 23 yds

Top receivers

- CIN – A. J. Green - 5 rec, 49 yds
- CLE – Josh Gordon - 3 rec, 48 yds

Top defenders

- CIN – Carlos Dunlap - 6 tackles, 1 sack
- CLE – Craig Robertson - 10 tackles, 1 INT

This was the second regular season meeting between the two teams. The Browns, having won the first meeting in Cincinnati, were looking to sweep the season series for the first time since 2002. However, the Bengals throttled the Browns in a 30–0 defeat, dominating from start to finish. The Bengals pounced on the Browns early, scoring a touchdown on their opening drive. They went up 20–0 in the first half and never looked back. Manziel was awful in his first start for the Browns, going 10/18 for 80 yards, 0 touchdowns, and 2 interceptions. The Browns' 38 offensive plays were the lowest in the NFL this season.

The Browns were shut out in a game for the first time since 2011. The 30-point margin of defeat was their largest margin of defeat since 2011. They extended their losing streak in December games, having lost 10 consecutive games, dating back to 2012.

==== Week 16: at Carolina Panthers ====
Week Sixteen: Cleveland Browns at Carolina Panthers – Game summary

Quarter	1	2	3	4	Total
Browns	0	3	3	7	**13**
**Panthers**	3	7	0	7	**17**

at Bank of America Stadium, Charlotte, North Carolina

- Date: December 21
- Game time: 1:00 pm. EST
- Game weather: 48 °F (8.9 °C), mostly cloudy
- Game attendance: 73,810
- Referee: Ed Hochuli
- TV announcers (CBS): Tom McCarthy and Adam Archuleta
- Recap, Gamebook

Game information

First quarter

- CAR (2:47) - Graham Gano 23 yd field goal
  **Panthers 3, Browns 0** Drive: 14 plays, 77 yds, 6:25

Second quarter

- CLE (13:25) - Garrett Hartley 43 yd field goal
  **Panthers 3, Browns 3** Drive: 10 plays, 55 yds, 4:22
- CAR (1:55) - Cam Newton 2 yd run (Graham Gano kick)
  **Panthers 10, Browns 3** Drive: 12 plays, 57 yds, 6:26

Third quarter

- CLE (3:14) - Garrett Hartley 31 yd field goal
  **Panthers 10, Browns 6** Drive: 9 plays, 43 yds, 5:02

Fourth quarter

- CLE (9:59) - Jordan Cameron 81 yd pass from Brian Hoyer (Garrett Hartley kick)
  **Browns 13, Panthers 10** Drive: 3 plays, 85 yds, 1:23
- CAR (7:07) - Jonathan Stewart 9 yd pass from Cam Newton (Graham Gano kick)
  **Panthers 17, Browns 13** Drive: 7 plays, 66 yds, 2:52

Top passers

- CLE – Brian Hoyer - 7/13, 134 yds, 1 TD, 1 INT
- CAR – Cam Newton - 18/31, 201 yds, 1 TD, 1 INT

Top rushers

- CLE – Isaiah Crowell - 16 carr, 55 yds
- CAR – Jonathan Stewart - 24 carr, 122 yds

Top receivers

- CLE – Jordan Cameron - 3 rec, 88 yds, 1 TD
- CAR – Kelvin Benjamin - 5 rec, 47 yds

Top defenders

- CLE – Karlos Dansby - 12 tackles
- CAR – Luke Kuechly - 7 tackles

The Browns entered this game playing for pride and looking to sweep the NFC South. In a low scoring first half, the Panthers jumped out to a 10–3 lead. QB Johnny Manziel got off to another slow start, going 3 for 8 with only 32 passing yards. The Browns gained only 2 first downs with Manziel in the first half (with one first down coming via penalty). With less than two minutes remaining in the first half, Manziel injured his hamstring, and was ruled out for the rest of the game. In the third quarter, the Browns added a field goal from newly signed K Garrett Hartley, cutting the deficit to 10–6. In the fourth quarter, Hoyer threw an 81-yard TD pass to TE Jordan Cameron, and the Browns led 13–10. However, the Panthers would score the go-ahead touchdown on their next drive and go up 17–13. With the Browns facing a 4th and 11 at midfield, HC Mike Pettine elected to punt. The Browns' defense couldn't force a punt or turnover, and the Panthers ran out the clock.

On December 26, due to injuries to both Hoyer and Manziel, Connor Shaw was announced to be the starting quarterback for the Browns' Week 17 matchup against the Ravens. On December 27, WR Josh Gordon was suspended for the season finale for a violation of team rules.

As of 2026, this remains the last the Browns lost to the Panthers.

==== Week 17: at Baltimore Ravens ====
Week Seventeen: Cleveland Browns at Baltimore Ravens – Game summary

Quarter	1	2	3	4	Total
Browns	0	3	7	0	**10**
**Ravens**	0	3	0	17	**20**

at M&T Bank Stadium, Baltimore, Maryland

- Date: December 28
- Game time: 1:00 pm. EST
- Game weather: 54 °F (12.2 °C), cloudy
- Game attendance: 71,070
- Referee: Gene Steratore
- TV announcers (CBS): Kevin Harlan, Rich Gannon and Jamie Erdahl
- Recap, Gamebook

Game information

First quarter

- No scoring

Second quarter

- BAL (8:05) - Justin Tucker 25 yd field goal
  **Ravens 3, Browns 0** Drive: 9 plays, 51 yds, 3:32
- CLE (2:32) - Garrett Hartley 38 yd field goal
  **Ravens 3, Browns 3** Drive: 10 plays, 55 yds, 5:33

Third quarter

- CLE (3:29) - Terrance West 2 yd run (Garrett Hartley kick)
  **Browns 10, Ravens 3** Drive: 7 plays, 80 yds, 3:53

Fourth quarter

- BAL (10:37) - Justin Tucker 28 yd field goal
  **Browns 10, Ravens 6** Drive: 8 plays, 73 yds, 4:04
- BAL (7:33) - Torrey Smith 16 yd pass from Joe Flacco (Justin Tucker kick)
  **Ravens 13, Browns 10** Drive: 2 plays, 69 yds, 0:50
- BAL (3:44) - Kamar Aiken 2 yd pass from Joe Flacco (Justin Tucker kick)
  **Ravens 20, Browns 10** Drive: 6 plays, 57 yds, 3:16

Top passers

- CLE – Connor Shaw - 14/28, 177 yds, 1 INT
- BAL – Joe Flacco - 22/36, 312 yds, 2 TD

Top rushers

- CLE – Terrance West - 18 carr, 94 yds, 1 TD
- BAL – Justin Forsett - 17 carr, 119 yds

Top receivers

- CLE – Taylor Gabriel - 3 rec, 66 yds
- BAL – Steve Smith, Sr. - 8 rec, 90 yds

Top defenders

- CLE – Craig Robertson - 9 tackles
- BAL – Daryl Smith - 9 tackles

In the season finale against the Ravens, undrafted rookie QB Connor Shaw started the game as the team's 3rd starting QB for the season. Defensive and kicking units kept the game close, as both offenses were disrupted for the entire first half; K's Justin Tucker and Garrett Hartley scored field goals for a 3–3 tie. In the third quarter, the Browns got key plays from Shaw and rookie RB Terrence West, as he scored on a 2-yard run to take the lead 10–3. Because of the amount of plays on the field for the defense, however, they ran out of gas in the fourth, and QB Joe Flacco led Baltimore to 17 straight unanswered points, including a pair of passing TDs to Kamar Aiken and Torrey Smith, for the Ravens' 20–10 win.

With the loss, the Browns finished the season 7–9. This marked the team's seventh consecutive season with a losing record and 14th in their 16 seasons since returning to the NFL in 1999. The Browns finished 3–5 in away games.

== Standings and Postseason ==
On December 23, Pro Bowl selections were announced for the season: S Tashaun Gipson, CB Joe Haden, and OT Joe Thomas were named starters for the Pro Bowl. This marked Thomas' eighth straight Pro Bowl selection, making him the first offensive lineman in NFL history to be nominated in each of his first eight seasons. On January 19, S Donte Whitner was added to the Pro Bowl roster, his third career selection.

On January 3, 2015, Thomas was named to the Associated Press’ 2014 NFL All-Pro team for the fifth time. On January 12, the Pro Football Writers' Assn. named Thomas to the All-NFL team while G Joel Bitonio joined Thomas on the All-AFC team. Bitonio was one of only two rookies on the squad.

The Browns' 25-point comeback win over the Tennessee Titans was selected as a finalist for the GMC "Never Say Never" moment of 2014.

On January 28, Haden was named a Global Ambassador for the Special Olympics. He became the first American professional football player to ever hold the title.

=== Division ===
AFC North
	W	L	T	PCT	DIV	CONF	PF	PA	STK
^{(3)} Pittsburgh Steelers	11	5	0	.688	4–2	9–3	436	368	W4
^{(5)} Cincinnati Bengals	10	5	1	.656	3–3	7–5	365	344	L1
^{(6)} Baltimore Ravens	10	6	0	.625	3–3	6–6	409	302	W1
Cleveland Browns	7	9	0	.438	2–4	4–8	299	337	L5

=== Conference ===
AFC
#	Team	Division	W	L	T	PCT	DIV	CONF	SOS	SOV	STK
Division leaders
1 (Note: New England defeated Denver head-to-head (Week 9, 43–21).)	New England Patriots	East	12	4	0	.750	4–2	9–3	.514	.487	L1
2	Denver Broncos	West	12	4	0	.750	6–0	10–2	.521	.484	W1
3 (Note: Pittsburgh defeated Indianapolis head-to-head (Week 8, 51–34).)	Pittsburgh Steelers	North	11	5	0	.688	4–2	9–3	.451	.486	W4
4	Indianapolis Colts	South	11	5	0	.688	6–0	9–3	.479	.372	W1
Wild Cards
5	Cincinnati Bengals	North	10	5	1	.656	3–3	7–5	.498	.425	L1
6	Baltimore Ravens	North	10	6	0	.625	3–3	6–6	.475	.378	W1
Did not qualify for the postseason
7 (Note: Kansas City finished ahead of San Diego in the AFC West based on head-to-head sweep (Week 7, 23–20; Week 17, 19–7). Houston finished ahead of Kansas City and Buffalo based on conference record. Kansas City finished ahead of Buffalo based on head-to-head victory (Week 10, 17–13). San Diego finished ahead of Buffalo based on head-to-head victory (Week 3, 22–10).)	Houston Texans	South	9	7	0	.563	4–2	8–4	.447	.299	W2
8	Kansas City Chiefs	West	9	7	0	.563	3–3	7–5	.512	.500	W1
9	San Diego Chargers	West	9	7	0	.563	2–4	6–6	.512	.403	L1
10	Buffalo Bills	East	9	7	0	.563	4–2	5–7	.516	.486	W1
11	Miami Dolphins	East	8	8	0	.500	3–3	6–6	.512	.406	L1
12	Cleveland Browns	North	7	9	0	.438	2–4	4–8	.479	.371	L5
13	New York Jets	East	4	12	0	.250	1–5	4–8	.543	.375	W1
14 (Note: Jacksonville finished ahead of Oakland based on record vs. common opponents (1–4 to 0–5).)	Jacksonville Jaguars	South	3	13	0	.188	1–5	2–10	.514	.313	L1
15	Oakland Raiders	West	3	13	0	.188	1–5	2–10	.570	.542	L1
16	Tennessee Titans	South	2	14	0	.125	1–5	2–10	.506	.375	L10
Tiebreakers (Note: When breaking ties for three or more teams under the NFL's rules, they are first broken within divisions, then comparing only the highest ranked remaining team from each division.)

== Personnel ==
=== Staff / Coaches ===
2014 Cleveland Browns staff
Front office: Owner – Jimmy Haslam; President – Alec Scheiner; Executive vice president of business operations – Bryan Wiedmeier; General manager – Ray Farmer; Director of player personnel – Jon Sandusky; Vice president of player personnel - Morocco Brown; Special advisor – Jim Brown; Head coaches: Head coach – Mike Pettine; Offensive coaches: Offensive coordinator – Kyle Shanahan; Quarterbacks – Dowell Loggains; Running backs – Wilbert Montgomery; Wide receivers – Mike McDaniel; Tight ends – Brian Angelichio; Offensive line – Andy Moeller; Assistant offensive line – George DeLeone; Offensive quality control – Richard Hightower; Offensive quality control – T.C. McCartney	Defensive coaches: Defensive coordinator – Jim O'Neil; Defensive line – Anthony Weaver; Linebackers – Chuck Driesbach; Assistant linebackers – Brian Fleury; Defensive backs – Jeff Hafley; Assistant defensive backs – Bobby Babich; Assistant defensive backs – Aaron Glenn; Defensive assistant – Ryan Downard; Defensive quality control – Tony Tuioti; Special teams coaches: Special teams coordinator – Chris Tabor; Special teams assistant – Shawn Mennenga; Strength and conditioning: Strength and conditioning – Paul Ricci; Assistant strength and conditioning – Derik Keyes; Assistant strength and conditioning – Mike Wolf; Performance Analyst - Daniel Kant-Hull

=== Final roster ===
2014 Cleveland Browns roster
Quarterbacks (QB): 6 Brian Hoyer; 9 Connor Shaw; 4 Tyler Thigpen; Running backs (RB): 34 Isaiah Crowell; 20 Shaun Draughn; 28 Terrance West; 41 Glenn Winston; Wide receivers (WR): 89 Phil Bates; 11 Travis Benjamin; 18 Taylor Gabriel; 16 Andrew Hawkins; 15 Marlon Moore KR; 13 Rodney Smith; Tight ends (TE): 82 Gary Barnidge; 84 Jordan Cameron; 81 Jim Dray	Offensive linemen (OL): 75 Joel Bitonio G; 77 John Greco G; 79 Andrew McDonald T; 68 Nick McDonald C; 74 Paul McQuistan G; 69 Vinston Painter G; 72 Mitchell Schwartz T; 62 Ryan Seymour C; 73 Joe Thomas T; Defensive linemen (DL): 92 Desmond Bryant DE; 70 Sione Fua NT; 71 Ahtyba Rubin NT; 93 John Hughes DE; 66 Jamie Meder NT; 90 Billy Winn DE	Linebackers (LB): 59 Tank Carder ILB; 56 Karlos Dansby ILB; 58 Christian Kirksey ILB; 99 Paul Kruger OLB; 51 Barkevious Mingo OLB; 53 Craig Robertson ILB; 97 Jabaal Sheard OLB; 49 Scott Solomon OLB; Defensive backs (DB): 24 Johnson Bademosi SS; 26 Pierre Desir CB; 21 Justin Gilbert CB; 23 Joe Haden CB; 30 Jim Leonhard FS; 42 Robert Nelson CB; 33 Jordan Poyer FS/PR; 22 Buster Skrine CB; 31 Donte Whitner SS; 36 K'Waun Williams CB; Special teams (ST): 10 Garrett Hartley K; 47 Charley Hughlett LS; 5 Spencer Lanning P; 57 Christian Yount LS	Practice squad: 91 Calvin Barnett NT (IR); 63 Karim Barton G; 65 Braxston Cave C; 88 Kevin Cone WR; 37 Kendall James CB; 60 Jacobbi McDaniel DE; 96 Keith Pough LB; 78 Christian Tupou NT; Reserve: 19 Miles Austin WR (IR); 95 Armonty Bryant DE (IR); 61 Michael Bowie T (IR); 50 Darius Eubanks LB (IR); 39 Tashaun Gipson FS (IR); 12 Josh Gordon WR (Susp.); 67 Ishmaa'ily Kitchen NT (IR); 55 Alex Mack C (IR); 2 Johnny Manziel QB (IR); 98 Phil Taylor DE (IR); Rookies in italics 53 active, 11 reserve, 7 practice squad
