= Craig Robertson (American football) =

American football player (born 1988)

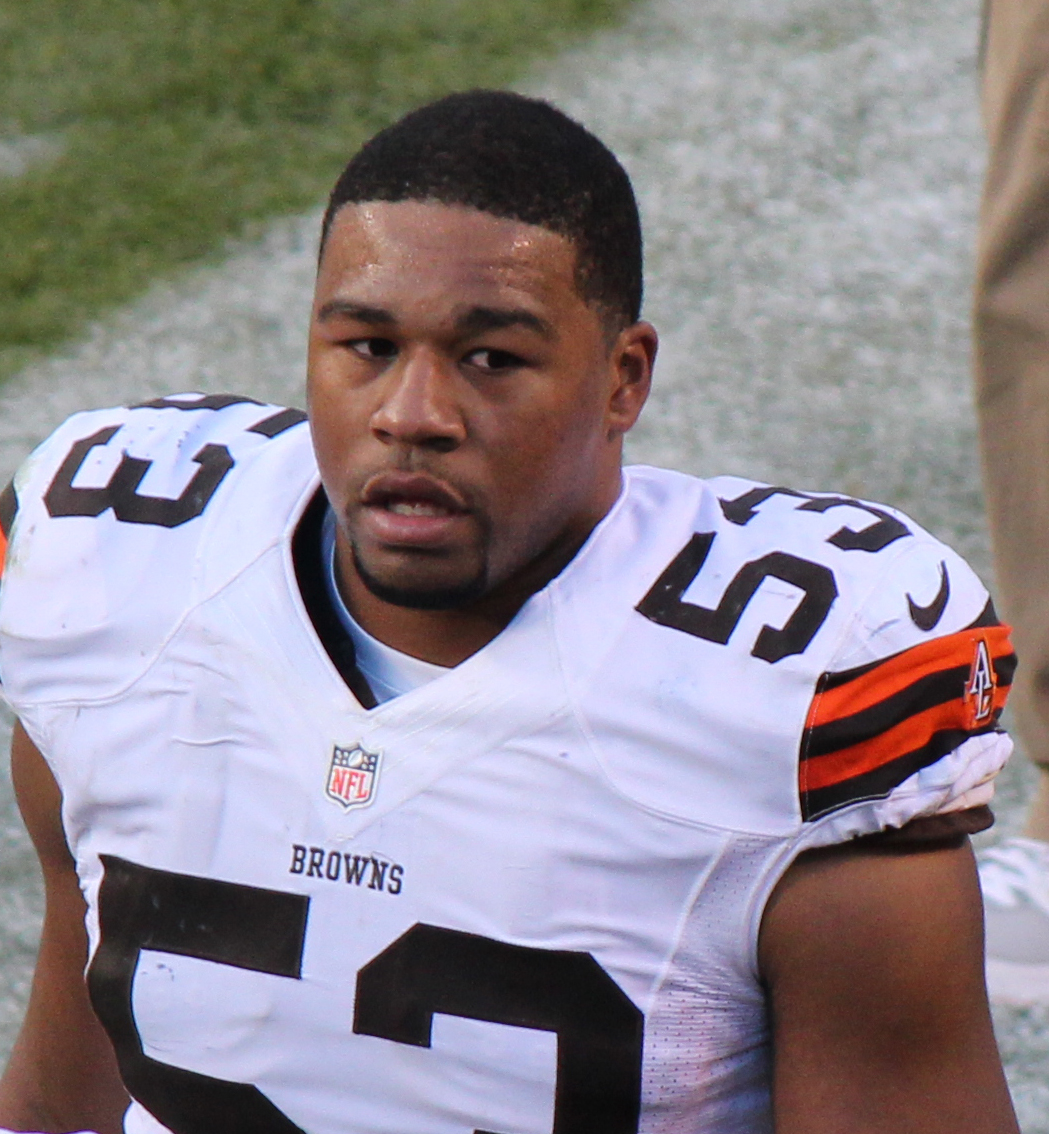
- Robertson with the Cleveland Browns in 2012

Buffalo Bills
- Title: Defensive quality control coach

Personal information
- Born: February 11, 1988 (age 38); Stafford, Texas, U.S.
- Listed height: 6 ft 1 in (1.85 m)
- Listed weight: 234 lb (106 kg)

Career information
- Position: Linebacker (No. 52, 53)
- High school: Stafford
- College: North Texas (2006–2010)
- NFL draft: 2011: undrafted

Career history

Playing
- Cleveland Browns (2011–2015); New Orleans Saints (2016–2020)

Coaching
- Buffalo Bills (2026–present) Defensive quality control coach

Awards and highlights
- First-team All-Sun Belt (2010)

Career NFL statistics
- Total tackles: 579
- Sacks: 9.0
- Forced fumbles: 3
- Fumble recoveries: 9
- Interceptions: 10
- Defensive touchdowns: 1
- Stats at Pro Football Reference

Craig Robertson (born February 11, 1988) is an American professional football coach and former player who was a linebacker in the National Football League (NFL). He was signed by the Cleveland Browns as an undrafted free agent in 2011. Robertson played college football for the North Texas Mean Green. As of February 2026, Robertson is the defensive quality control coach for the Buffalo Bills.

== Early life ==
Craig Robertson attended Stafford High School in Stafford, Texas.

Robertson played many positions in high school, including option quarterback, running back, cornerback, wide receiver, kicker and punter. Robertson was also an all-star performer in basketball and baseball. He was also an honor roll student and member of student council while prepping at Stafford High School. Following a stellar career on and off the field at Stafford, Robertson chose to play football at the University of North Texas. Robertson is one of only four former football players from Stafford High School to play in the NFL, others being Boris Anyama, Adrian Awasom, and Jalen Pitre.

== College career ==
The athletic Robertson was initially recruited to play safety at North Texas. However, Robertson displayed a physicality that coaches felt would be better served at linebacker. After redshirting his freshman year, Robertson became the starter at linebacker midway through his redshirt freshman season, a position he held the remainder of his collegiate career. During his tenure at North Texas, Robertson earned All-America honors as a freshman, and Sun Belt All-Conference honors as a sophomore and senior. As a senior, Robertson led the conference in solo tackles and total tackles.

While attending North Texas, Robertson became a member of Phi Gamma chapter of Omega Psi Phi fraternity.

== Professional career ==
Pre-draft measurables
Height	Weight	Arm length	Hand span	40-yard dash	10-yard split	20-yard split	20-yard shuttle	Three-cone drill	Vertical jump	Broad jump	Bench press
6 ft 0 1/8 in (1.83 m)	235 lb (107 kg)	31 in (0.79 m)	9 3/4 in (0.25 m)	4.76 s	1.64 s	2.73 s	4.27 s	7.01 s	34.5 in (0.88 m)	9 ft 7 in (2.92 m)	22 reps
All values from North Texas's Pro Day

Robertson went undrafted in the 2011 NFL draft and did not receive any offers to sign as an undrafted free agent or invitations to tryout during rookie minicamp.

=== Cleveland Browns ===
==== 2011 ====
On December 19, 2011, the Cleveland Browns signed Robertson to their practice squad after he attended a tryout. He remained on the practice squad for the last two games of the regular season.

==== 2012 ====
On January 3, 2012, the Cleveland Browns signed Robertson to a two-year, $870,000 reserve/futures contract.

Throughout OTA's and training camp, he competed for a roster spot, as a backup linebacker, against James-Michael Johnson, Quinton Spears, Kaluka Maiava, Emmanuel Acho, Ben Jacobs, L. J. Fort, and JoJo Dickson. Head coach Pat Shurmur named Robertson the backup outside linebacker, behind Scott Fujita, Kakula Maiava, and James-Michael Johnson, to begin the regular season.

He had an opportunity to play immediately on defense after rookie Emmanuel Acho was placed on injured reserve due to an undisclosed injury, starting outside linebacker Chris Gocong was placed on IR after tearing his Achilles tendon during camp in August, and the Browns' other starting outside linebacker, Scott Fujita, was suspended for the first three games due to his participation in the New Orleans Saints bounty scandal.

He made his professional regular season debut in the Cleveland Browns' season-opener against the Philadelphia Eagles and recorded nine combined tackles, two pass deflections, and made his first career interception off a pass by quarterback Michael Vick in their 17–16 loss. He made his first career tackle with teammate D'Qwell Jackson on tight end Brent Celek and his first career solo tackle on Jason Avant, with both coming in the first quarter. In Week 3, Robertson earned his first career start, in place of Kakula Maiava, and made eight combined tackles during a 24–14 loss to the Buffalo Bills. On November 18, 2012, Robertson recorded five combined tackles and made his first career sack on quarterback Tony Romo during a 23–20 loss at the Dallas Cowboys in Week 11. On December 23, 2012, he earned his third career start and recorded a season-high 14 combined tackles (12 solo) in a 34–12 loss at the Denver Broncos. Defensive coordinator Dick Jauron opted to start Robertson at outside linebacker, instead of Kakula Maiava. Robertson finished his rookie season with 93 combined tackles (62 solo), three pass deflections, two interceptions, and one sack in 16 games and three starts. He was used as an extra linebacker in nickel packages and was tasked with covering the tight end.

On December 31, 2012, it was reported that the Cleveland Browns' new owner, Jimmy Haslam, fired head coach Pat Shurmur and general manager Tom Heckert, Jr. after they finished fourth in the AFC North with a 5–11 record.

==== 2013 ====
Robertson entered OTA's and training camp in 2013 and competed to be a starting inside linebacker in Ray Horton's base 3-4 defense against James-Michael Johnson. Head coach Rob Chudzinski named Robertson the starting right inside linebacker, along with left inside linebacker D'Qwell Jackson, to begin the regular season.

He started in the Cleveland Browns' season-opener against the Miami Dolphins and made five combined tackles in their 23–10 loss. On October 27, 2013, Robertson recorded a season-high 11 solo tackles and sacked Alex Smith in the Browns' 23–17 loss at the Kansas City Chiefs in Week 8. On November 17, 2013, he made three combined tackles before exiting the Browns' 41–20 loss at the Cincinnati Bengals in the second quarter with a knee injury. He attempted to return to the game, but was unable to continue. Robertson underwent an MRI the following day and was diagnosed with a knee sprain that sidelined him for the next two games (Weeks 12–13). He finished the 2013 season with 85 combined tackles (57 solo), three pass deflections, three sacks, and an interception in 14 games and 14 starts. On December 30, 2013, the Cleveland Browns' general manager Mike Lombardi unexpectedly fired head coach Rob Chudzinski after the Browns finished 4–12. Lombardi would be fired less than three months later. His overall grade from Pro Football Focus ranked 52nd out of the 55 inside linebackers that qualified.

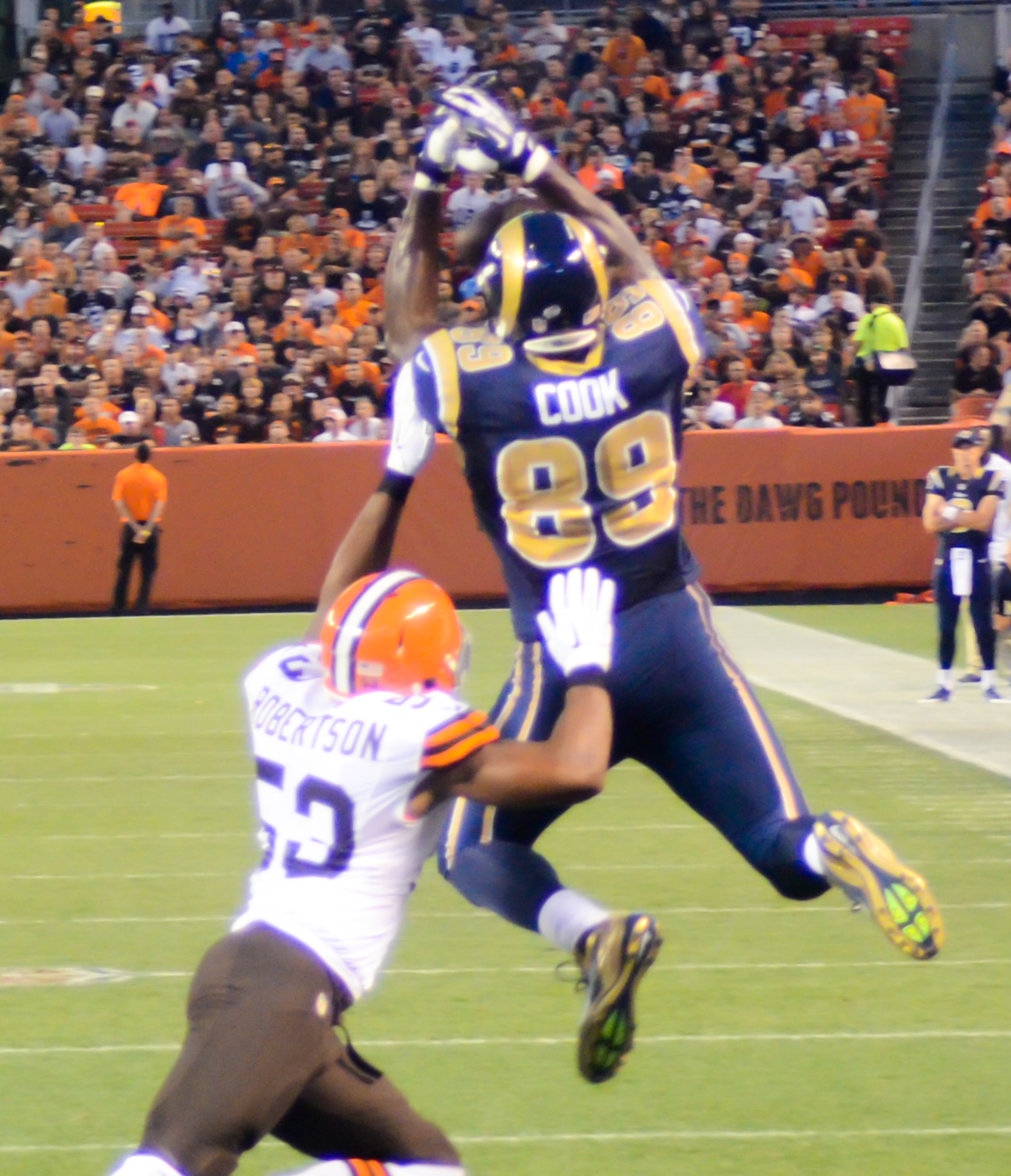
Robertson covering Jared Cook in 2014

==== 2014 ====
On March 6, 2014, the Cleveland Browns extended an exclusive-rights free agent tender offer to Robertson. On April 7, 2014, Robertson signed his one-year, $570,000 tender offer from the Browns.

Defensive coordinator Jim O'Neil held a competition between Robertson and rookie Christian Kirksey for the job as a starting inside linebacker. Head coach Mike Pettine named Robertson the starter, along with right inside linebacker Karlos Dansby, to start the regular season.

In Week 10, Robertson recorded six combined tackles, broke up a pass, and intercepted a pass by Andy Dalton during a 24–3 victory at the Cincinnati Bengals. On December 7, 2014, he collected a season-high 12 combined tackles (ten solo) and deflected a pass in the Browns' 25–24 loss to the Indianapolis Colts. He finished the season with 99 combined tackles (57 solo), four pass deflections, and two interceptions in 16 games and 11 starts. He finished with the 19th highest overall grade, among 60 qualifying inside linebackers by Pro Football Focus.

==== 2015 ====
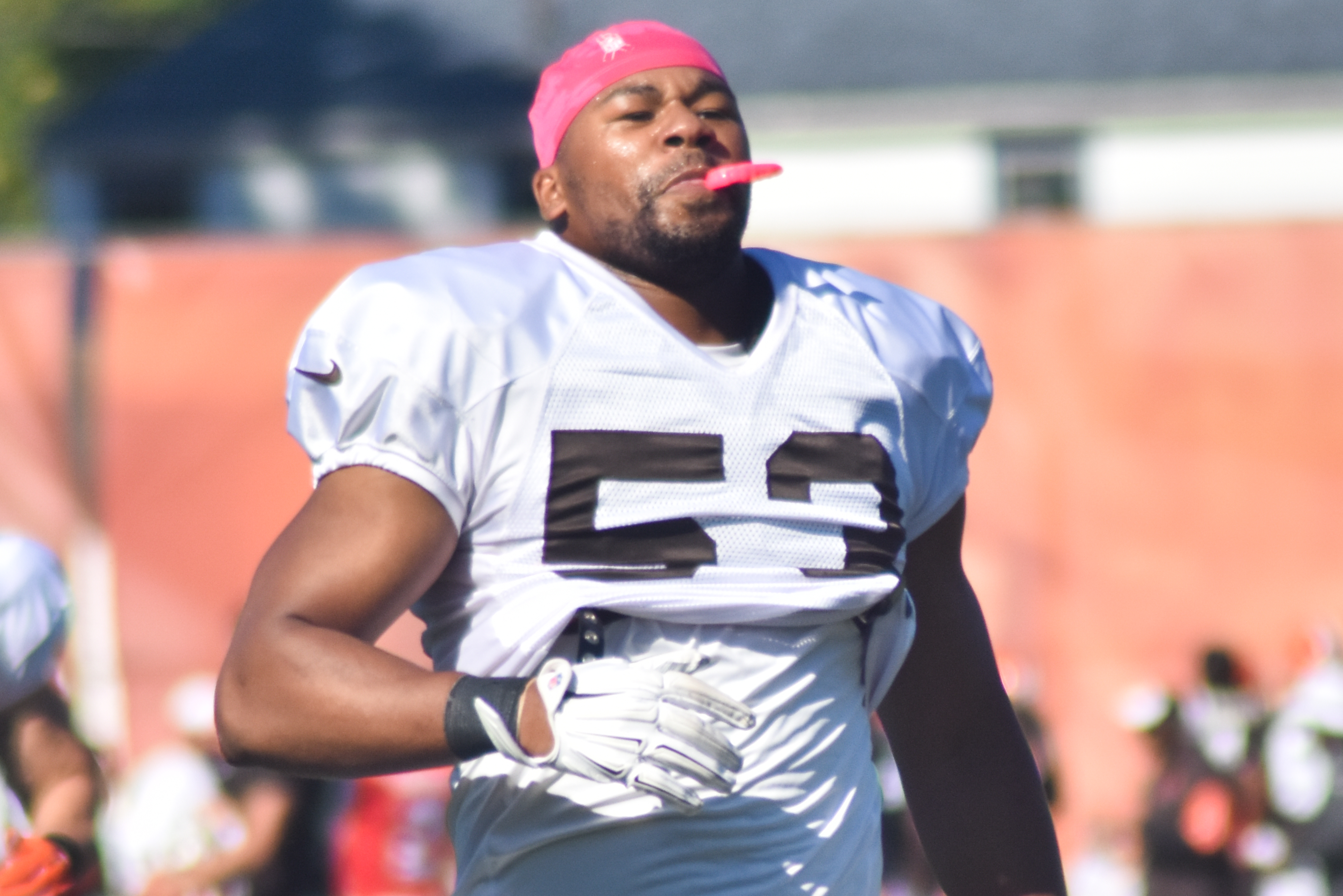
Robinson with the Browns in 2015

On March 9, 2015, Browns general manager Ray Farmer placed a restricted free agent tender on Robertson. On April 20, 2015, the Cleveland Browns signed Robertson to a one-year, $2.35 million contract tender.

Throughout training camp, he competed against Christian Kirksey to retain his job as the starting inside linebacker. Head coach Mike Pettine named him the backup behind Kirksey to begin the regular season.

On September 27, 2015, Robertson made three combined tackles before leaving the Browns' 27–20 loss at the Oakland Raiders after suffering an ankle injury. He missed the next four games due to a sprained ankle (Week 4–8). In Week 13, Robertson recorded a season-high nine combined tackles in the Browns' 37–3 loss to the Cincinnati Bengals. On January 3, 2016, Robertson made three combined tackles, broke up a pass, and intercepted a pass by quarterback Ben Roethlisberger during a 28–12 loss to the Pittsburgh Steelers. He finished with 59 combined tackles (34 solo), five pass deflections, and an interception in 12 games and nine starts. He experienced a career low in tackles and snaps due to his four-game absence and sharing his starting job with Christian Kirksey.

Robertson became an unrestricted free agent after the 2015 season and had private visits with the Seattle Seahawks and New Orleans Saints.

=== New Orleans Saints ===
On March 22, 2016, the New Orleans Saints signed Robertson to a three-year, $5 million contract that includes $1.96 million guaranteed and a signing bonus of $1.20 million.

Throughout training camp, he competed for the job as the starting weakside linebacker against Dannell Ellerbe and Nate Stupar. Head coach Sean Payton named Robertson the backup weakside linebacker, behind Dannell Ellerbe, to start the regular season.

He made his New Orleans Saints' regular season debut in their season-opener against the Oakland Raiders and recorded 11 combined tackles (eight solo) and a pass deflection in their 35–34 loss. The following week, he collected a season-high 13 combined tackles (ten solo) in the Saints' 16–13 loss at the New York Giants. In Week 9, Robertson made five combined tackles, two pass deflections, and intercepted a pass by Colin Kaepernick during a 41–23 victory at the San Francisco 49ers. The following week, he collected nine combined tackles, broke up a pass, and made his first sack as a Saint on quarterback Trevor Siemian during a 25–23 loss to the Denver Broncos. On December 4, 2016, Robertson recorded four solo tackles before exiting the Saints' 28–13 loss to the Detroit Lions in three fourth quarter after sustaining an injury. He was sidelined for the Saints' Week 14 loss at the Tampa Bay Buccaneers due to his injured shoulder. He finished the 2016 season with a career-high 115 combined tackles (71 solo), four pass deflections, a sack, and an interception in 15 games and 15 starts.

==== 2017 ====
Throughout training camp, he competed against A. J. Klein, Manti Te'o, and Alex Anzalone to maintain his job as the starting middle linebacker. Defensive coordinator Dennis Allen opted to name him the backup weakside linebacker behind rookie Alex Anzalone. Robertson lost his starting middle linebacker role to newly acquired free agent Manti Te'o.

Robertson became the starting weakside linebacker in Week 5 after Alex Anzalone was place on injured reserve after sustaining a shoulder injury the previous week. On October 15, 2017, Robertson made his first start of the season and recorded a season-high 11 combined tackles (four solo), deflected a pass, and sacked Matthew Stafford during a 52–38 victory against the Detroit Lions in Week 6. In Week 15, he recorded seven combined tackles, a pass deflection, and intercepted a pass by Bryce Petty during a 31–19 win against the New York Jets. Robertson finished the 2017 season with 80 combined tackles (53 solo), six pass deflections, two interceptions, and two sacks in 16 games and 12 starts. Pro Football Focus gave Robertson an overall grade of 74.6, ranking him 39th among all qualifying linebackers in 2017.

The New Orleans Saints finished first in the NFC South with an 11–5 record. On January 7, 2018, Robertson started in his first career playoff game and recorded six combined tackles in the Saints' 31–26 victory against the Carolina Panthers in the NFC Wildcard Game. The following week, he made nine combined tackles during a 29–24 loss at the Minnesota Vikings in the NFC Divisional Round.

==== 2018 ====
In 2018, Robertson played in all 16 games, recording a career-low 14 combined tackles.

==== 2019 ====
On March 11, 2019, Robertson signed a two-year contract extension with the Saints.

On March 11, 2022, Robertson announced his retirement from professional football.

== Coaching career ==
=== Buffalo Bills ===
On February 13, 2026, Robertson was hired by the Buffalo Bills to serve as the team's defensive quality control coach.

== NFL career statistics ==
Legend
	Led the league
**Bold**	Career high

=== Regular season ===
Year	Team	Games		Tackles					Interceptions					Fumbles			
Year	Team	GP	GS	Cmb	Solo	Ast	Sck	TFL	Int	Yds	TD	Lng	PD	FF	FR	Yds	TD
2012	CLE	**16**	3	93	62	21	1.0	4	**2**	1	0	1	3	0	**2**	2	0
2013	CLE	14	14	85	57	28	**3.0**	4	1	12	0	12	3	**1**	1	7	0
2014	CLE	**16**	11	99	57	42	0.0	**6**	**2**	30	0	15	4	0	1	0	**1**
2015	CLE	12	9	59	34	25	0.0	2	1	**38**	0	**38**	5	0	1	**9**	0
2016	NOR	15	**15**	**115**	**71**	**44**	1.0	**6**	1	29	0	29	4	0	**2**	5	0
2017	NOR	**16**	12	80	53	27	2.0	5	**2**	20	0	20	**6**	**1**	**2**	8	0
2018	NOR	**16**	0	14	11	3	1.0	2	0	0	0	0	0	0	0	0	0
2019	NOR	15	1	27	20	7	1.0	2	1	3	0	3	1	0	0	0	0
2020	NOR	**16**	0	7	7	0	0.0	0	0	0	0	0	0	**1**	0	0	0
		136	65	579	372	207	9.0	31	10	133	0	38	26	3	9	31	1

=== Regular season ===
Year	Team	Games		Tackles					Interceptions					Fumbles			
Year	Team	GP	GS	Cmb	Solo	Ast	Sck	TFL	Int	Yds	TD	Lng	PD	FF	FR	Yds	TD
2017	NOR	**2**	**2**	**14**	**6**	**8**	0.0	0	0	0	0	0	0	0	0	0	0
2018	NOR	**2**	0	0	0	0	0.0	0	0	0	0	0	0	0	0	0	0
2019	NOR	1	1	4	2	2	0.0	**1**	0	0	0	0	0	0	0	0	0
2020	NOR	**2**	0	0	0	0	0.0	0	0	0	0	0	0	0	0	0	0
		7	2	18	8	10	0.0	1	0	0	0	0	0	0	0	0	0
