= Tashaun Gipson =

American football player (born 1990)

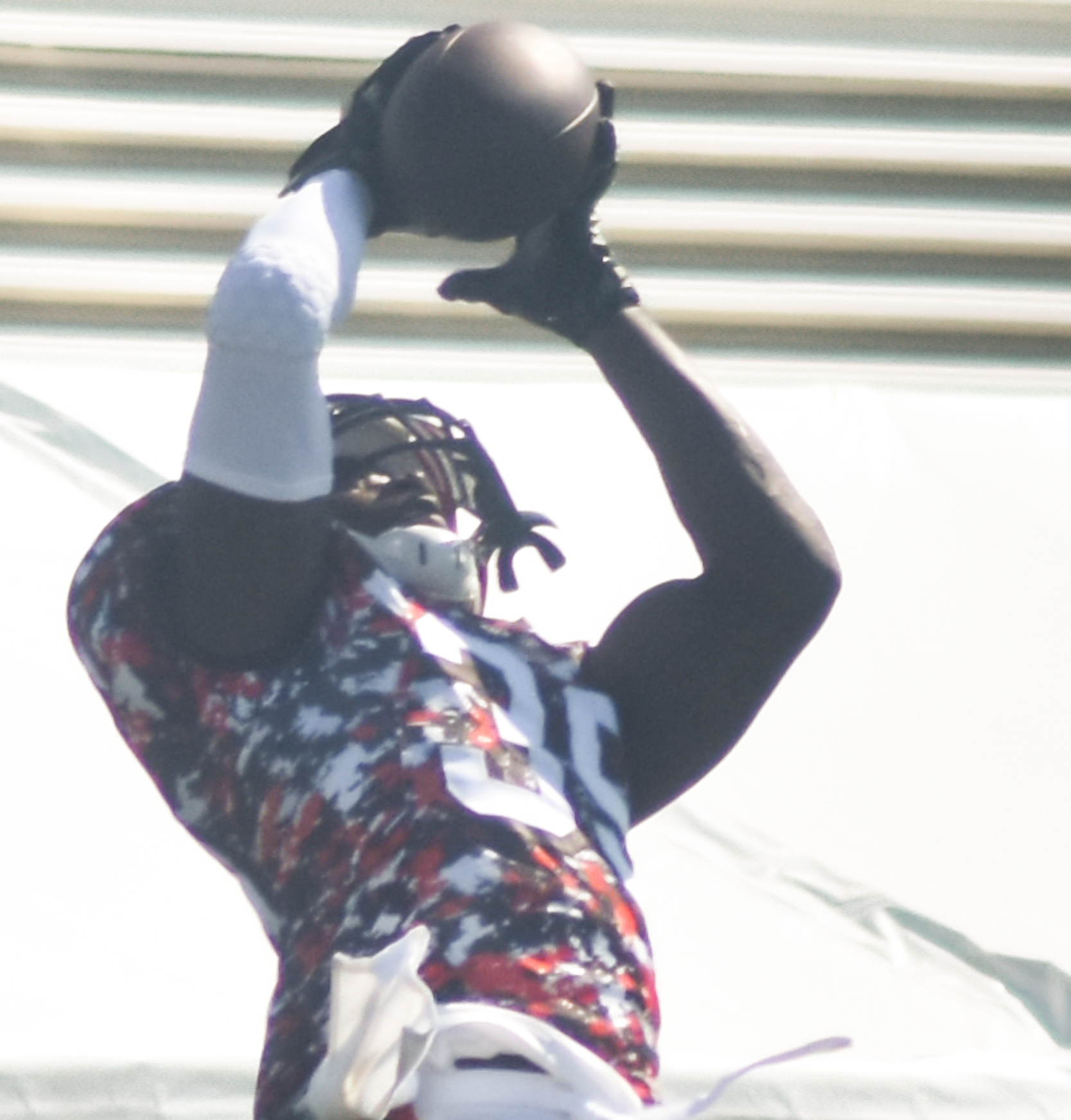
- Gipson with the Cleveland Browns in 2015

Profile
- Position: Safety

Personal information
- Born: August 7, 1990 (age 36); San Bernardino, California, U.S.
- Listed height: 6 ft 0 in (1.83 m)
- Listed weight: 212 lb (96 kg)

Career information
- High school: Justin F. Kimball (Dallas, Texas)
- College: Wyoming (2008–2011)
- NFL draft: 2012: undrafted

Career history
- Cleveland Browns (2012–2015); Jacksonville Jaguars (2016–2018); Houston Texans (2019); Chicago Bears (2020–2021); San Francisco 49ers (2022–2023); Jacksonville Jaguars (2024); San Francisco 49ers (2024)

Awards and highlights
- Pro Bowl (2014); Second-team All-MWC (2011)

Career NFL statistics
- Total tackles: 690
- Sacks: 2.5
- Forced fumbles: 1
- Fumble recoveries: 3
- Pass deflections: 69
- Interceptions: 33
- Defensive touchdowns: 3
- Stats at Pro Football Reference

Tashaun James Gipson Sr. (born August 7, 1990) is an American professional football safety. He played college football for the Wyoming Cowboys and signed with the Cleveland Browns as an undrafted free agent in 2012. Gipson has also played for the Jacksonville Jaguars, Houston Texans, Chicago Bears, and San Francisco 49ers.

== Early life ==
Born in San Bernardino, California and raised in Dallas, Texas, Gipson was a three-sport star at Kimball High School in Dallas, playing football and basketball while also running track. As a senior, he was named the Most Valuable Player of the 4A District 14 Dallas City League and also earned First Team All-District honors both as a cornerback and as a returner. On defense, Gipson made 35 tackles, broke up nine passes and recovered two fumbles. On offense and special teams, he accumulated more than 1,400 all-purpose yards and scored 14 touchdowns while serving as an offensive team captain. During his career, Gipson played quarterback, wide receiver, free safety and also returned punts and kicks. He was recruited by Baylor, Louisville, Fresno State and Idaho.

== College career ==
Gipson chose to attend the University of Wyoming not only for the chance at early playing time, but also in order to play with his brother Marcell. At Wyoming, both brothers played cornerback from 2008 to 2010 for the Wyoming Cowboys football team. 2011 proved to be Gipson's best statistically with 95 total tackles (73 solo 22 assist) with 0.5 sacks, a forced fumble, and three interceptions. As a senior, Tashaun started the season by playing at the cornerback position, but for the final eight games of the season, he played at the safety position. Gipson had three interceptions as sophomore in 2009 and three as a junior in 2010. As a freshman, Tashaun did not have any interceptions. However, along with Marcell, the Gipson brothers both tied for the team lead in pass deflections with 10 each. Gipson started every game of his collegiate career at Wyoming.

== Professional career ==
Pre-draft measurables
Height	Weight	40-yard dash	10-yard split	20-yard split	20-yard shuttle	Three-cone drill	Vertical jump	Broad jump	Bench press
5 ft 11 7/8 in (1.83 m)	206 lb (93 kg)	4.57 s	1.59 s	2.73 s	4.28 s	6.83 s	35.5 in (0.90 m)	10 ft 2 in (3.10 m)	23 reps
All values from Wyoming's Pro Day

=== Cleveland Browns ===
==== 2012 ====
On April 29, 2012, the Cleveland Browns signed Gipson to a three-year, $1.44 million contract after he went undrafted in the 2012 NFL draft.

Throughout training camp, Gipson competed against Ray Ventrone, Usama Young, David Sims, and Emanuel Davis to be the primary backup safety. Head coach Pat Shurmur named him a backup and listed him as the third free safety on the depth chart to begin the season, behind veterans Eric Hagg and Ray Ventrone.

Gipson made his professional regular season debut in the season-opener against the Philadelphia Eagles and made his first career tackle on Brandon Boykin during the first quarter of the narrow 17–16 loss. Gipson earned increased playing time after Hagg had an underwhelming performance in the first two games. During Week 4 against the Baltimore Ravens on Thursday Night Football, Gipson made two combined tackles (one solo) before leaving the eventual 23–16 road loss with a knee injury. He was inactive for five games (Weeks 5–9) due to his injury.

During Week 12 against the Pittsburgh Steelers, Gipson earned his first career start in place of Usama Young and had two solo tackles in the 20–14 victory. In the next game against the Oakland Raiders, Gipson recorded a season-high eight combined tackles (seven solo) during the 20–17 road victory at the Oakland Raiders in Week 13. The following week against the Kansas City Chiefs, he had two combined tackles (one solo), a pass deflection, and his first career interception on a pass attempt thrown by Brady Quinn to wide receiver Jonathan Baldwin in the 30–7 road victory. Gipson suffered a foot injury during practice and was subsequently inactive for the regular-season finale.

Gipson finished his rookie year with 33 combined tackles (26 solo), a pass deflection, and an interception in 10 games and three starts.

==== 2013 ====
During the offseason, the Browns saw the departures of Usama Young via free agency and Eric Hagg after he was released. Defensive coordinator Ray Horton had Gipson compete against Johnson Bademosi for the starting role at free safety. New head coach Rob Chudzinski named Gipson the starting free safety to begin the season and paired him with strong safety T. J. Ward.

Gipson started in the season-opening 23–10 loss to the Miami Dolphins and recorded three solo tackles, a pass deflection, and an interception. In the next game against the Ravens, he had a team-high nine combined tackles (tied with Buster Skrine) during the 14–6 road loss.

During Week 6 against the Detroit Lions, Gipson recorded seven combined tackles (four solo), a pass deflection, and an interception in the 31–17 loss. In the next game against the Green Bay Packers, he had nine combined tackles (seven solo) and a pass deflection during the 31–13 road loss. The following week against the Chiefs, Gipson collected a season-high nine solo tackles in the 23–17 road loss.

During a Week 15 38–31 loss to the Chicago Bears, Gipson recorded eight combined tackles (five solo), two pass deflections, two interceptions, and returned an interception off a pass by Jay Cutler for a 44-yard touchdown. The pick-six came in the second quarter and marked Gipson's first NFL touchdown. In the regular-season finale against the Steelers, he had six combined tackles (three solo), a pass deflection, and an interception during the 20–7 road loss.

Gipson finished his second professional season with 95 combined tackles (63 solo), 12 pass deflections, five interceptions, and an interception returned for a touchdown in 16 games and 15 starts.

==== 2014 ====
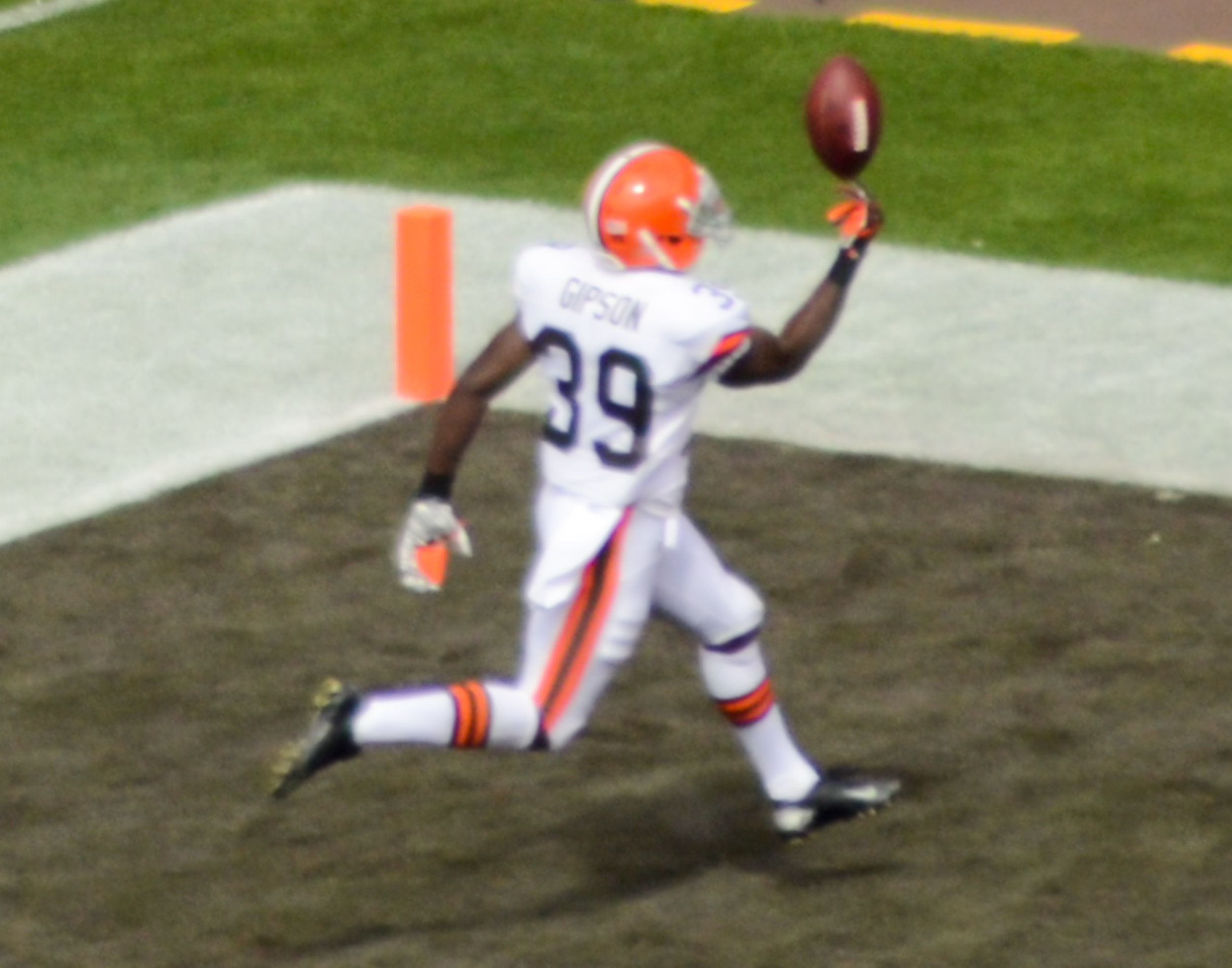
Gibson in 2014

Gipson entered training camp as the Browns' de facto starting free safety. Gipson and newly acquired free agent Donte Whitner were named the starting safeties to begin the regular season.

During a narrow Week 2 26–24 victory over the New Orleans Saints, Gipson recorded eight combined tackles (three solo), a pass deflection, and returned an interception by Drew Brees for a 62-yard touchdown. In the next game against the Ravens, Gipson had five combined tackles (three solo), a pass deflection, and an interception during the narrow 23–21 loss. Three weeks later against the Steelers, Gipson recorded a season-high nine combined tackles (four solo) in the 31–10 victory.

During Week 7 against the Jacksonville Jaguars, Gipson had four combined tackles (three solo), two pass deflections, and intercepted Blake Bortles twice in the 24–6 road loss. In the next game against the Raiders, Gipson recorded two solo tackles, a pass deflection, and an interception during the 23–13 victory. The following week against the Tampa Bay Buccaneers, he had five combined tackles (three solo), a pass deflection, and an interception in the 22–17 victory, marking his third consecutive game with an interception.

During a Week 10 24–3 road victory over the Cincinnati Bengals on Thursday Night Football, Gipson recorded three combined tackles (one solo), a pass deflection, and a forced fumble. Two weeks later against Atlanta Falcons, he had three combined tackles (two solo) before leaving the eventual narrow 26–24 road victory in the fourth quarter after colliding with teammate Joe Haden and sustaining a knee injury. On December 20, 2014, the Browns placed Gipson on injured reserve for the last two games after he missed the last three games after sustaining damage to his MCL and PCL. Gipson led the league in interceptions at the time of his injury, but would ultimately finish second. Three days later, it was announced that Gipson was voted to play in the 2015 Pro Bowl, alongside teammates Joe Haden and Joe Thomas.

Gipson finished the 2014 season with 52 combined tackles (28 solo), eight pass deflections, a touchdown, a forced fumble, a pick-six, and a career-high six interceptions in 11 games and starts. On January 20, 2015, it was reported that he would have to miss the Pro Bowl due to his knee injury. Gipson was ranked 67th on the NFL Top 100 Players of 2015 by his peers.

==== 2015 ====
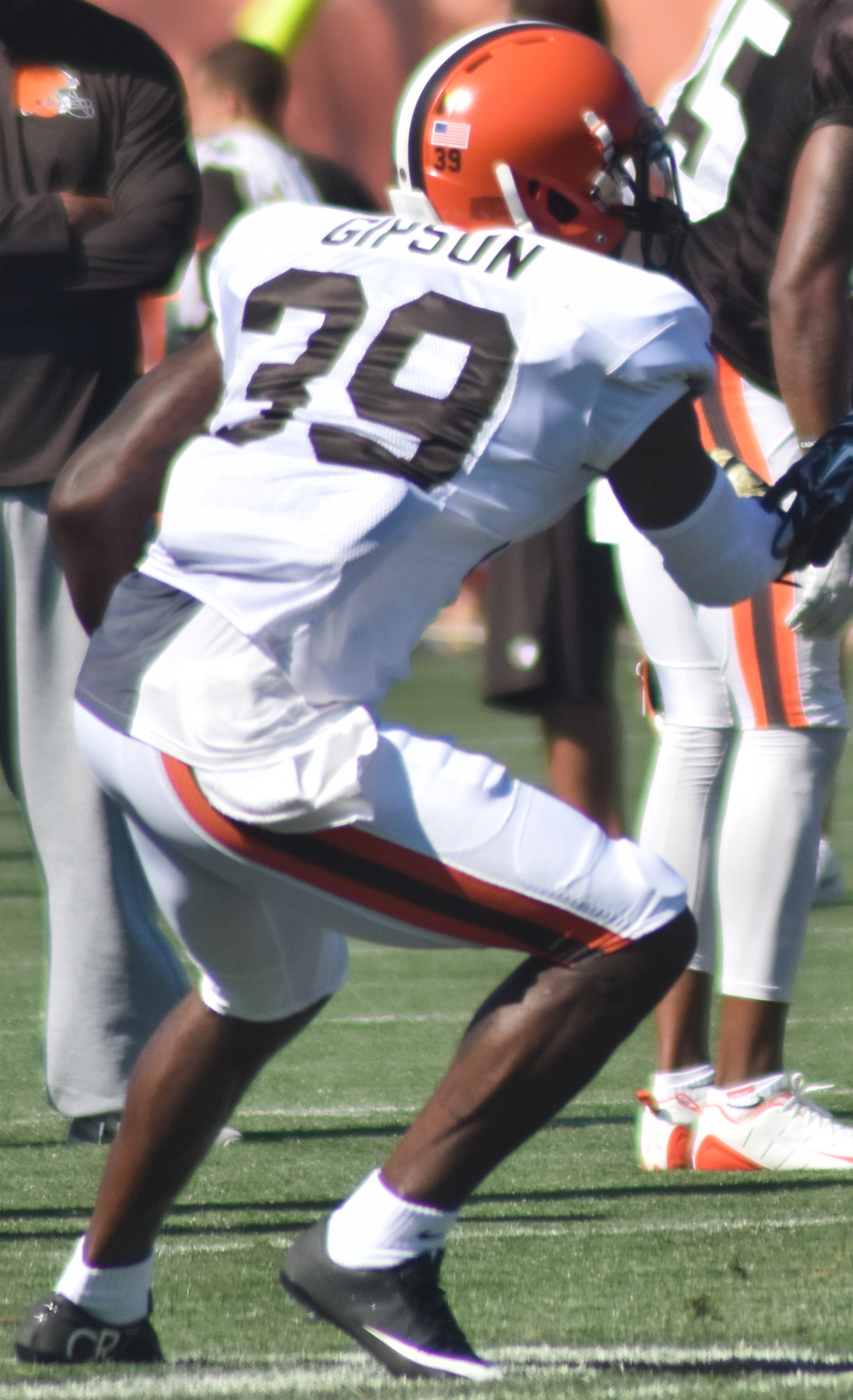
Gipson in 2015

On March 9, 2015, the Browns placed a second-round tender on Gipson and agreed to a one-year, $2.56 million contract. Head coach Mike Pettine retained Gipson and Donte Whitner as the starting safety duo entering the 2015 regular season.

Gipson started in the season-opening 31–10 road loss to the New York Jets and recorded five combined tackles (two solo), a pass deflection, and an interception. He missed three consecutive games (Weeks 5–7) due to an ankle injury. Gipson returned in Week 8 against the Arizona Cardinals and recorded a solo tackle, a pass deflection, and an interception during the 34–20 loss. During Week 15 against the Seattle Seahawks, he had a season-high nine combined tackles (five solo) in the 30–13 road loss.

Gipson finished the 2015 season with 60 combined tackles (42 solo), two pass deflections, and two interceptions in 13 games and starts. After the season, he became an unrestricted free agent and did not receive an offer to remain with the Browns.

=== Jacksonville Jaguars ===
==== 2016 ====
On March 9, 2016, the Jacksonville Jaguars signed Gipson to a five-year, $38.5 million max value contract with $12 million guaranteed upon signing and an initial signing bonus of $4 million. He was named the starting free safety alongside strong safety Johnathan Cyprien.

During Week 3 against the Ravens, Gipson recorded three solo tackles, a pass deflection, and an interception in the narrow 19–17 loss. During a Week 16 38–17 victory over the Tennessee Titans, he had two solo tackles and a pass deflection. In the regular-season finale against the Indianapolis Colts, Gipson recorded a season-high six combined tackles (two solo) during the 24–20 road loss.

Gipson finished the 2016 season with 41 combined tackles (34 solo), two pass deflections, and an interception in 16 games and starts.

==== 2017 ====
Gipson was named the starting free safety to begin the regular season opposite starting strong safety Barry Church.

Gipson started in the season-opener against the Houston Texans and recorded six combined tackles (four solo), two pass deflections, and returned an interception by Deshaun Watson for 67 yards in the fourth quarter of the 29–7 road victory. Three weeks later against the Jets, Gipson had a season-high seven solo tackles and a pass deflection in the 23–20 road loss. In the next game against the Steelers, he recorded six combined tackles (four solo), two pass deflections, and intercepted Ben Roethlisberger twice during the 30–9 road victory. The Jaguars recorded a total of five interceptions by Roethlisberger in the game.

During a Week 10 20–17 overtime victory over the Chargers, Gipson recorded five solo tackles and a fumble recovery. Two weeks later against the Cardinals, he had two solo tackles and a pass deflection in the 27–24 road loss. In the next game against the Colts, he had four combined tackles (two solo), a pass deflection, and an interception during the 30–10 victory.

Gipson finished the 2017 season with 64 combined tackles (53 solo), seven pass deflections, four interceptions, and a fumble recovery in 16 games and starts. The Jaguars finished atop the AFC South with a 10–6 record and qualified for the playoffs as the #3-seed. During the Wild Card Round against the Buffalo Bills, Gipson started in his first career playoff game and finished the 10–3 victory with five solo tackles. In the Divisional Round against the Steelers, Gipson had a tackle during the 45–42 road victory. During the AFC Championship Game against the New England Patriots, he recorded a solo tackle in the 24–20 road loss.

==== 2018 ====
During the season-opening 20–15 road victory over the New York Giants, Gipson had four combined tackles and a pass deflection. Two weeks later against the Titans, he recorded a season-high six solo tackles in the 9–6 loss.

During Week 5 against the Chiefs, Gipson recorded two solo tackles, two pass deflections, and his first interception of the season 30–14 road loss. In the next game against the Dallas Cowboys, he had six combined tackles (five solo) during the 40–7 road loss. Two weeks later against the Eagles in London, Gipson recorded a season-high seven combined tackles (six solo) in the 24–18 loss.

During a Week 12 24–21 road loss to the Bills, Gipson had three combined tackles (two solo) and a pass deflection. In the next game against the Colts, he recorded two combined tackles (one solo) and a pass deflection during the 6–0 shutout victory.

Gipson finished the 2018 season with 54 combined tackles (44 solo), seven pass deflections, and an interception in 16 games and starts.

On March 8, 2019, Gipson was released by the Jaguars due to salary cap issues.

=== Houston Texans ===
On March 12, 2019, the Houston Texans signed Gipson to a three-year, $22.5 million contract that included $11.25 million guaranteed and a signing bonus of $1.5 million.

Gipson made his Texans debut in the season-opener against the Saints on Monday Night Football and finished the narrow 30–28 road loss with three combined tackles (one solo). Two weeks later against the Los Angeles Chargers, Gipson recorded four combined tackles (two solo) and two pass deflections in the 27–20 road victory.

During a Week 5 53–32 victory over the Falcons, Gipson recorded three combined tackles (two solo), a pass deflection, and a 79-yard pick six off of Matt Ryan. In the next game against the Chiefs, Gipson had five tackles, a pass deflection, and an interception during the 31–24 road victory. He missed Weeks 8 and 9 due to injuries.

Gipson returned from injury in Week 11 against the Ravens and finished the 41–7 blowout loss with four solo tackles. In the next game against the Colts on Thursday Night Football, he had three combined tackles (one solo) and a pass deflection during the 20–17 victory. The following week against the Patriots on Sunday Night Football, Gipson recorded six combined tackles (five solo) and a pass deflection in the 28–22 victory. During a Week 14 38–24 loss to the Denver Broncos, he had two tackles, two pass deflections, and his third interception of the season.

On December 31, 2019, Gipson was placed on injured reserve with a back injury, causing him to miss the playoffs. Gipson finished the 2019 season with 51 combined tackles (34 solo), eight pass deflections, three interceptions, and a pick-six in 14 games and starts.

On April 27, 2020, Gipson was released by the Texans.

=== Chicago Bears ===
==== 2020 ====
On May 1, 2020, the Chicago Bears signed Gipson to a one-year, $1.05 million contract with $550,000 guaranteed upon signing.

Gipson made his Bears debut during the season-opener against the Lions and finished the 27–23 road victory with seven combined tackles (five solo). Two weeks later against the Falcons, he recorded six combined tackles (four solo), a pass deflection, and his first interception of the year late in the fourth quarter off a pass thrown by Matt Ryan to secure a 30–26 comeback road victory. In the next game against the Colts, Gipson had a season-high nine combined tackles (eight solo) and a pass deflection during the 19–11 loss.

During a Week 6 23–16 road victory over the Carolina Panthers, Gipson recorded six combined tackles (two solo), a pass deflection, and an interception. In the next game against the Los Angeles Rams on Monday Night Football, he had a solo tackle and a pass deflection during the 24–10 road loss. Three weeks later against the Minnesota Vikings on Monday Night Football, Gipson recorded three combined tackles (two solo) and a fumble recovery in the 19–13 loss.

During Week 13 against the Lions, Gipson had three combined tackles (two solo) and a pass deflection in the 34–30 loss. Three weeks later against his former team, the Jaguars, Gipson recorded a solo tackle and two pass deflections during the 41–17 road victory.

Gipson finished the 2020 season with 66 combined tackles (48 solo), seven pass deflections, two interceptions, and a fumble recovery in 16 games and starts. The Bears finished second in the NFC North with an 8–8 record and qualified for the playoffs as the #7-seed. During the Wild Card Round against the Saints, Gipson recorded eight combined tackles (seven solo), a pass deflection, and a strip sack on Taysom Hill that was recovered by the Bears in the 21–9 road loss.

==== 2021 ====
On April 19, 2021, the Bears signed Gipson to a one-year, $2.55 million contract extension that included $1.32 million guaranteed and an initial signing bonus of $1 million.

During a Week 2 20–17 victory over the Bengals, Gipson had three combined tackles (two solo) and a fumble recovery. However, he missed the next two games with a hamstring injury. Gipson returned from injury in Week 5 against the Las Vegas Raiders and finished the 20–10 road victory with three solo tackles and his first NFL sack. Three weeks later against the San Francisco 49ers, Gipson had five combined tackles (three solo) and a pass deflection in the 33–22 loss.

During Week 11 against the Ravens, Gipson recorded four combined tackles (three solo) and his first interception of the season in the 16–13 loss. Three weeks later against the Packers, he had a season-high eight combined tackles (five solo) during the 45–30 road loss. During Week 17 against the Giants, he recorded two tackles, a pass deflection, and an interception in the 29–3 blowout victory.

Gipson finished the 2021 season with 47 combined tackles (33 solo), three pass deflections, two interceptions, a fumble recovery, and a sack in 12 games and starts.

=== San Francisco 49ers ===
==== 2022 ====
On August 22, 2022, the San Francisco 49ers signed Gipson to a one-year, $1.12 million contract. He was released eight days later, but was signed to the practice squad the next day. Gipson was promoted to the active roster on September 13.

Gipson made his 49ers debut during the season-opener against his former team, the Bears, and finished the 19–10 road loss with three combined tackles (two solo). In the next game against the Seahawks, Gipson recorded a solo tackle, a pass deflection, and his first interception of the season during the 27–7 victory. Three weeks later against the Panthers, Gipson had three tackles and 0.5 sacks in the 37–15 road victory.

During Week 6 against the Falcons, Gipson recorded a season-high nine combined tackles (six solo) in the 28–14 road loss. In the next game against the Chiefs, he had five solo tackles and a pass deflection during the 44–23 loss. During Week 12 against the Cardinals on Monday Night Football at Estadio Azteca in Mexico, Gipson recorded three solo tackles and a pass deflection in the 38–10 victory.

During a Week 14 35–7 victory over the Buccaneers, Gipson recorded five combined tackles (four solo), a pass deflection, and an interception off of Tom Brady. Two weeks later against the Washington Commanders, he had four combined tackles (two solo) and a pass deflection in the 37–20 victory. In the next game against the Raiders, Gipson had four combined tackles (two solo), a pass deflection, and an interception in overtime to help set up the game-winning field goal during the 37–34 road victory. During the regular-season finale against the Cardinals, he recorded two combined tackles (one solo), two pass deflections, and two interceptions in the 38–13 victory.

Gipson finished the 2022 season with 61 combined tackles (43 solo), eight pass deflections, 0.5 sacks, and a team-high five interceptions in 17 games and starts. The 49ers finished atop the NFC West with a 13–4 record and qualified for the playoffs as the #2-seed. During the Wild Card Round against the Seahawks, Gipson had three combined tackles (two solo) in the 41–23 victory. In the Divisional Round against the Cowboys, he recorded two combined tackles (one solo) during the 19–12 victory. During the NFC Championship Game against the Eagles, Gipson once again had two combined tackles (one solo) in the 31–7 road loss.

==== 2023 ====
On March 12, 2023, the 49ers signed Gipson to a one-year, $2.9 million contract extension that included $2.17 million guaranteed and a signing bonus of $1 million.

During a Week 5 42–10 victory over the Cowboys on Sunday Night Football, Gipson had two combined tackles (one solo), a pass deflection, and intercepted a pass off of Dak Prescott. Three weeks later against the Bengals, Gipson recorded a season-high eight combined tackles (six solo) in the 31–17 loss.

Following a Week 9 bye, the 49ers went on the road to face Gipson's former team, the Jaguars. He finished the 34–3 victory with a solo tackle and a pass deflection. In the next game against the Buccaneers, Gipson had three combined tackles (two solo) and a pass deflection during the 27–14 victory. The following week against the Seahawks on Thanksgiving, he recorded five combined tackles (four solo) and a sack in the 31–13 road victory.

Gipson finished the 2023 season with 60 combined tackles (41 solo), three pass deflections, a sack, and an interception in 16 games and starts. The 49ers finished atop the NFC West with a 12–5 record and qualified for the playoffs as the #1-seed. In the Divisional Round against the Packers, Gipson had three solo tackles during the 24–21 victory. During the NFC Championship Game against the Lions, he recorded six combined tackles (five solo), a forced fumble, and a pass deflection in the 34–31 comeback victory as the 49ers advanced to Super Bowl LVIII. In the Super Bowl against the Chiefs, Gipson had five combined tackles (four solo) during the 25–22 overtime loss.

On July 2, 2024, while still a free agent, Gipson received a six-game suspension for violating the league's performance enhancement substance policy.

=== Jacksonville Jaguars (second stint) ===
On August 11, 2024, the Jaguars signed Gipson to a one-year, $2.55 million contract that included $525,000 guaranteed upon signing and an initial signing bonus of $225,000. He was released on November 4.

=== San Francisco 49ers (second stint) ===
On November 5, 2024, Gipson was signed to the 49ers' practice squad. He was promoted to the active roster on November 23.

Gipson finished the 2024 season with six combined tackles (five solo) and a pass deflection in nine games and no starts.

== NFL career statistics ==
Legend
	Led the league
**Bold**	Career high

=== Regular season ===
Year	Team	Games		Tackles				Fumbles			Interceptions					
Year	Team	GP	GS	Comb	Solo	Ast	Sack	FF	FR	Yds	Int	Yds	Avg	Lng	TD	PD
2012	CLE	10	3	33	26	7	0.0	0	0	0	1	23	23.0	23	0	1
2013	CLE	16	15	**95**	**63**	**32**	0.0	0	0	0	5	143	28.6	44T	**1**	**12**
2014	CLE	11	11	52	28	24	0.0	**1**	0	0	**6**	**158**	26.3	62T	**1**	8
2015	CLE	13	13	60	42	18	0.0	0	0	0	2	0	0.0	0	0	2
2016	JAX	16	16	41	34	7	0.0	0	0	0	1	30	30.0	30	0	2
2017	JAX	16	16	64	53	11	0.0	0	**1**	0	4	83	20.8	67	0	7
2018	JAX	16	16	54	44	10	0.0	0	0	0	1	8	8.0	8	0	7
2019	HOU	14	14	51	37	14	0.0	0	0	0	3	105	**35.0**	**79T**	**1**	8
2020	CHI	16	16	66	48	18	0.0	0	**1**	0	2	10	5.0	9	0	7
2021	CHI	12	12	47	33	14	**1.0**	0	**1**	**13**	2	31	15.5	31	0	3
2022	SF	**17**	**17**	61	43	18	0.5	0	0	0	5	141	28.2	56	0	8
2023	SF	16	16	60	41	19	**1.0**	0	0	0	1	26	26.0	26	0	3
2024	SF	9	0	6	5	1	0.0	0	0	0	0	0	0.0	0	0	1
Career		182	165	690	497	193	2.5	1	3	13	33	758	23.0	79T	3	69

=== Postseason ===
Year	Team	Games		Tackles				Fumbles			Interceptions					
Year	Team	GP	GS	Comb	Solo	Ast	Sack	FF	FR	Yds	Int	Yds	Avg	Lng	TD	PD
2017	JAX	**3**	**3**	7	6	1	0.0	0	0	0	0	0	0.0	0	0	0
2019	HOU	0	0	Did not play due to injury												
2020	CHI	1	1	8	7	1	**1.0**	**1**	0	0	0	0	0.0	0	0	**1**
2022	SF	**3**	**3**	7	4	**3**	0.0	0	0	0	0	0	0.0	0	0	0
2023	SF	**3**	**3**	**14**	**12**	2	0.0	**1**	0	0	0	0	0.0	0	0	**1**
Career		10	10	36	29	7	1.0	2	0	0	0	0	0	0	0	2
