= Donte Whitner =

American football player (born 1985)

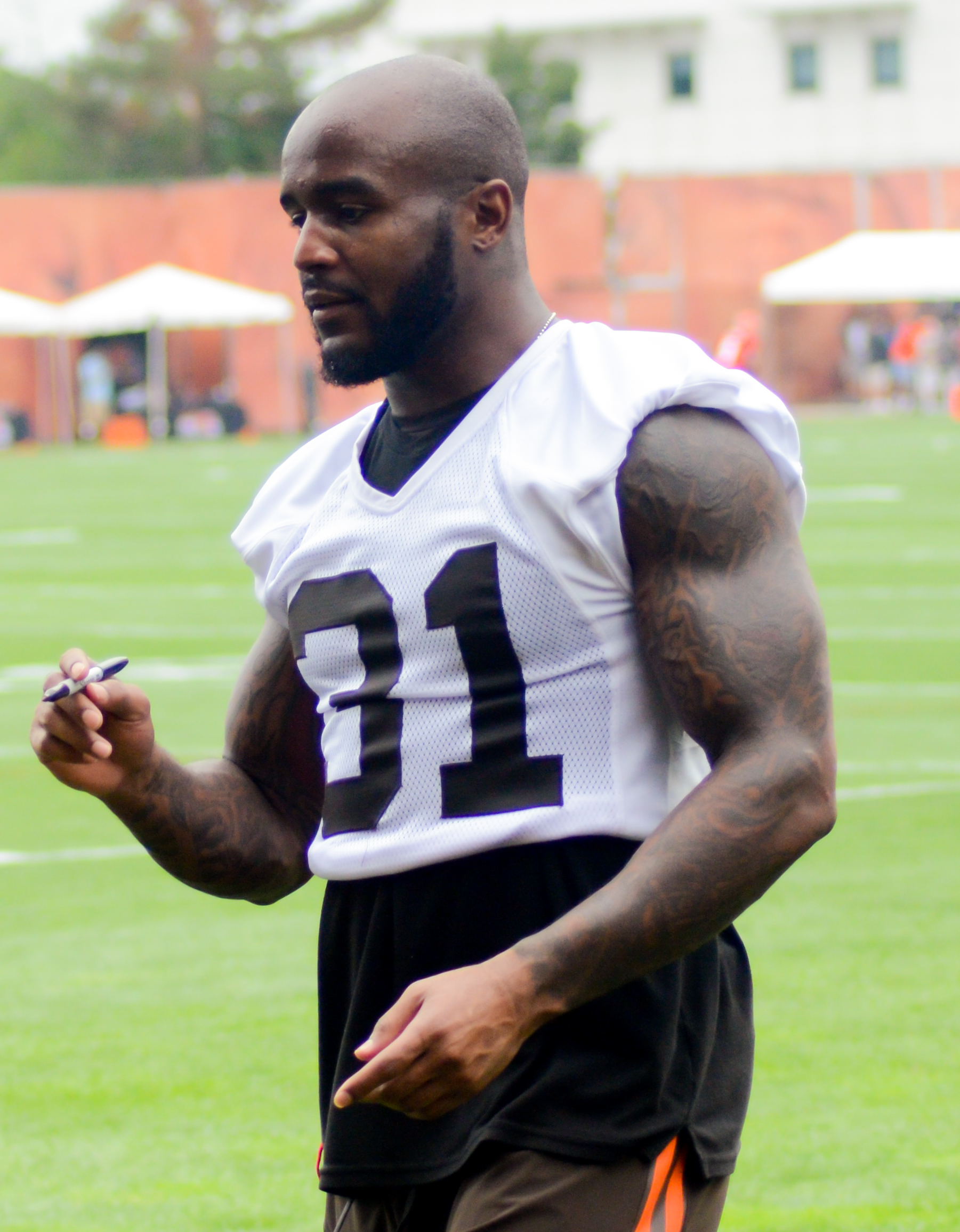
- Whitner with the Cleveland Browns in 2014

No. 20, 31, 39
- Position: Safety

Personal information
- Born: July 24, 1985 (age 41); Cleveland, Ohio, U.S.
- Listed height: 5 ft 10 in (1.78 m)
- Listed weight: 208 lb (94 kg)

Career information
- High school: Glenville (Cleveland)
- College: Ohio State (2003–2005)
- NFL draft: 2006: 1st round, 8th overall pick

Career history
- Buffalo Bills (2006–2010); San Francisco 49ers (2011–2013); Cleveland Browns (2014–2015); Washington Redskins (2016)

Awards and highlights
- 3× Pro Bowl (2012–2014); PFWA All-Rookie Team (2006); First-team All-Big Ten (2005)

Career NFL statistics
- Total tackles: 922
- Sacks: 3.0
- Forced fumbles: 11
- Fumble recoveries: 6
- Interceptions: 11
- Defensive touchdowns: 2
- Stats at Pro Football Reference

Donte Demetrius Whitner Sr. (born July 24, 1985) is an American former professional football player who was a safety in the National Football League (NFL). He played college football for the Ohio State Buckeyes, and was selected by the Buffalo Bills with the eighth overall pick in the 2006 NFL draft. Whitner also played in the NFL for the San Francisco 49ers, Cleveland Browns, and Washington Redskins.

== Early life ==
Whitner was born in Cleveland, Ohio. He is the older brother of former Connecticut Huskies defensive end Lindsey Witten. He attended Glenville High School in Cleveland. After his senior high school football season he was invited to the U.S. Army All-American Bowl game. He attended Ohio State, not finishing his degree, and then enrolled at San Jose State University several years into his NFL career.

When Whitner was six years old he was hit by an oncoming car after chasing a loose football down the street. He had up to 30 fractures in his legs from the impact and was told that he might not be able to walk again. The oncoming car suffered significant body damage. He spent three months in a full body cast but recovered.

== College career ==
Whitner played for the Ohio State Buckeyes from 2003 to 2005 as both a defensive back and safety. His junior year proved his most rewarding as he earned all-conference honors and helped the Buckeyes defeat Notre Dame during the 2005 Fiesta Bowl. During the 2005 season, Whitner recorded 73 tackles and 2 interceptions.

== Professional career ==
Pre-draft measurables
| Height | Weight | Arm length | Hand span | 40-yard dash | 10-yard split | 20-yard split | Vertical jump | Broad jump | Bench press |
|---|---|---|---|---|---|---|---|---|---|
| 5 ft 10 1/8 in (1.78 m) | 204 lb (93 kg) | 30 5/8 in (0.78 m) | 7 7/8 in (0.20 m) | 4.45 s | 1.56 s | 2.61 s | 40.0 in (1.02 m) | 11 ft 0 in (3.35 m) | 18 reps |
All values from NFL Combine

=== Buffalo Bills ===
The Buffalo Bills selected Whitner in the first round (eighth overall) of the 2006 NFL draft. Whitner was the second safety drafted in 2006 and was selected one pick behind Texas safety Michael Huff.

Whitner was the first player ever drafted with the NFL draft chime, despite being the eighth pick of the 2006 NFL draft. It is unknown why it was not played from the start of the 2006 NFL draft.

Whitner missed the beginning of training camp due to a contract holdout. On August 7, 2006, the Buffalo Bills signed Whitner to a five-year, $29 million contract that includes $13.51 million guaranteed.

In his first career game, he recorded his first interception against Tom Brady. The ruling on the field was a touchdown, but was later overruled when replay showed that Whitner had stepped out of bounds. He finished 2006 with 104 total tackles and one interception for 10 yards. In 2009, Whitner recorded his first career touchdown on a 76-yard interception return from Tampa Bay Buccaneers quarterback Byron Leftwich in Week 2. His most productive game to date was in Week 12 of the 2010 season, where he recorded 18 total tackles against the Pittsburgh Steelers.

=== San Francisco 49ers ===
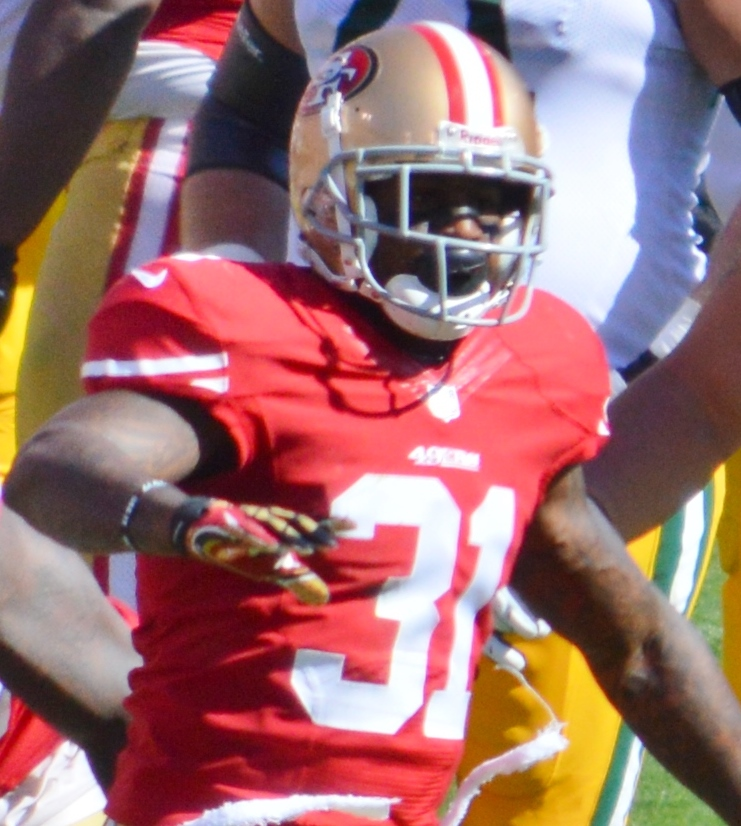
Whitner with the San Francisco 49ers in 2013

On August 4, 2011, Whitner signed with the San Francisco 49ers. After previously announcing on Twitter that he would be going to the Cincinnati Bengals, he changed his mind and signed with San Francisco. He agreed to a three-year, $11.75 million deal with $4 million guaranteed. After his performance in his first year as a 49er, he was named to the USA Today All Joe Team. During the 2011 playoffs, Whitner became famous for making vicious hits like against New Orleans Saints running back Pierre Thomas as he was driving for a touchdown. The hit forced a fumble recovered by the 49ers and took Thomas out for the rest of the game.

At the end of the 2012 season, Whitner and the 49ers appeared in Super Bowl XLVII. In the game, he had eight combined tackles as the 49ers fell to the Baltimore Ravens by a score of 34–31.

In 2013, in a game against the St. Louis Rams, Whitner was fined for a hit on receiver Chris Givens. In response to the fine, he indicated that he would be legally changing his last name from "Whitner" to "Hitner", dropping the "W" from his surname. In an appearance on NFL Network's "NFL Total Access" on November 27, 2013, Whitner indicated that his request was to be processed on November 19, but had to be withdrawn when he was unable to honor the judge's requirement that he appear in court. During the same interview, Whitner indicated that he would pursue his name change during the offseason.

=== Cleveland Browns ===
Whitner signed a four-year deal worth $28 million with the Cleveland Browns on March 11, 2014. On April 2, 2016, Whitner was released by the team. With his release, the Cleveland Browns cleared $3.95 million of cap space.

=== Washington Redskins ===
On October 5, 2016, Whitner signed with the Washington Redskins. After two games with the team, he became the starter at strong safety. He was placed on injured reserve on December 28 due to a quad injury.

== NFL career statistics ==
Legend
| **Bold** | Career high |

| Year | Team | Games | | Tackles | | | | Fumbles | | | Interceptions | | | | | |
| Year | Team | GP | GS | Cmb | Solo | Ast | Sck | FF | FR | Yds | Int | Yds | Avg | Lng | TD | PD |
|---|---|---|---|---|---|---|---|---|---|---|---|---|---|---|---|---|
| 2006 | BUF | 15 | 14 | 104 | 67 | 37 | 0.0 | 0 | 0 | 0 | 1 | 10 | 10 | 10 | 0 | 5 |
| 2007 | BUF | 15 | 15 | 89 | 68 | 21 | 0.0 | 1 | 0 | 0 | 1 | 29 | 29 | 29 | 0 | 1 |
| 2008 | BUF | 13 | 13 | 61 | 50 | 11 | 1.0 | 1 | 0 | 0 | 0 | 0 | 0 | 0 | 0 | 1 |
| 2009 | BUF | 10 | 8 | 57 | 42 | 15 | 0.0 | 0 | 0 | 0 | **2** | **104** | 52 | **76** | **1** | 5 |
| 2010 | BUF | 16 | 16 | **140** | **96** | **44** | 0.5 | 1 | 1 | 0 | 1 | 37 | 37 | 37 | 0 | 7 |
| 2011 | SF | 15 | 15 | 62 | 49 | 13 | 0.0 | 1 | **3** | **3** | **2** | 48 | 24 | 48 | 0 | 10 |
| 2012 | SF | 16 | 16 | 83 | 62 | 21 | 0.0 | **2** | 1 | 0 | 1 | 42 | 42 | 42 | **1** | 5 |
| 2013 | SF | 16 | 16 | 73 | 58 | 15 | 0.0 | **2** | 1 | -5 | **2** | 7 | 4 | 7 | 0 | **12** |
| 2014 | CLE | 16 | 16 | 106 | 69 | 37 | 0.0 | 1 | 0 | 0 | 1 | 54 | **54** | 54 | 0 | 5 |
| 2015 | CLE | 14 | 14 | 81 | 58 | 23 | **1.5** | 1 | 0 | 0 | 0 | 0 | 0 | 0 | 0 | 4 |
| 2016 | WAS | 11 | 9 | 66 | 49 | 17 | 0.0 | 1 | 0 | 0 | 0 | 0 | 0 | 0 | 0 | 0 |
| Career | | 157 | 152 | 922 | 668 | 254 | 3.0 | 12 | 6 | 0 | 11 | 331 | 30 | 76 | 2 | 55 |
