= Ray Farmer =

American football player and executive (born 1974)

Los Angeles Rams
- Title: Senior Advisor to the General Manager

Personal information
- Born: July 1, 1974 (age 52); White Plains, New York, U.S.
- Listed height: 6 ft 3 in (1.91 m)
- Listed weight: 225 lb (102 kg)

Career information
- Position: Linebacker (No. 55)
- High school: Robert B. Glenn (Kernersville, North Carolina)
- College: Duke
- NFL draft: 1996: 4th round, 121st overall pick

Career history

Playing
- Philadelphia Eagles (1996–1998); Carolina Panthers (1999)*
- * Offseason or practice squad member only

Operations
- Duke (2001) Academic coordinator; Atlanta Falcons (2002–2005) Scout; Kansas City Chiefs (2006–2012) Director of pro personnel; Cleveland Browns (2013) Assistant general manager; Cleveland Browns (2014–2015) General manager; Los Angeles Rams (2020) Scouting consultant; Los Angeles Rams (2021–present) Senior personnel executive

Awards and highlights
- As an executive: Super Bowl champion (LVI); As a player: Third-team All-American (1994); 2× First-team All-ACC (1994, 1995)

Career NFL statistics
- Total tackles: 63
- Sacks: 2
- Forced fumbles: 1
- Fumble recoveries: 4
- Interceptions: 1
- Stats at Pro Football Reference
- Executive profile at Pro Football Reference

Harvey Ray Farmer (born July 1, 1974) is an American professional football executive and former player who is a senior personnel executive to the general manager for the Los Angeles Rams of the National Football League (NFL). He is the former general manager of the Cleveland Browns, having served in that role from 2014 to 2015. Farmer has also previously served with the Kansas City Chiefs and Atlanta Falcons in their scouting departments. He played in the NFL as a linebacker for the Philadelphia Eagles.

== Playing career ==
Farmer played free safety at Duke University from 1992 to 1996. He was all-Atlantic Coast Conference (ACC) twice, and as a senior, he led the team in tackles with 111 and played in two collegiate all-star games.

Pre-draft measurables
Height	Weight	Arm length	Hand span	Bench press
6 ft 3 3/8 in (1.91 m)	225 lb (102 kg)	32 1/2 in (0.83 m)	8 5/8 in (0.22 m)	17 reps

After graduation with a degree in sociology, he was drafted by the Philadelphia Eagles in the fourth round of the 1996 NFL Draft, and played three seasons at linebacker. His career was ended by a knee injury.

== Executive career ==
=== Early career ===
From 1998 to 2000, Farmer worked in TV and radio before being hired as an academic coordinator at Duke University. he was the academic coordinator for football at Duke University in 2001.

=== Atlanta Falcons ===
In 2002, Farmer was hired by the Atlanta Falcons as a scout. He would serve in that position until 2005.

=== Kansas City Chiefs ===
In 2006, Farmer was hired by the Kansas City Chiefs to serve as their director of pro personnel.

=== Cleveland Browns ===
In 2013, Farmer was hired by the Cleveland Browns as their assistant general manager. In 2014, Farmer was promoted to general manager of the Browns, replacing Mike Lombardi.

In February 2015, the Northeast Ohio Media Group reported that Farmer was under investigation for sending texts to coaching staff discussing play-calling during games, which violated the league's electronic device policy. Farmer was eventually suspended in March 2015 for the first four games of the 2015 regular season without pay, and the team was fined $250,000.

On January 3, 2016, after Cleveland's final game of the season, Farmer was fired.

=== Los Angeles Rams ===
In 2020, Farmer was hired by the Los Angeles Rams as a scouting consultant. Following the 2020 NFL season, Farmer was promoted to senior personnel executive.

== Edxternal links ==
- Los Angeles Rams profile
