= 2013 Cleveland Browns season =

65th season in franchise history

- Owner: Jimmy Haslam
- General manager: Michael Lombardi
- Head coach: Rob Chudzinski
- Home stadium: FirstEnergy Stadium

Results
- Record: 4–12
- Division place: 4th AFC North
- Playoffs: Did not qualify
- Pro Bowlers: WR Josh Gordon; T Joe Thomas; C Alex Mack; TE Jordan Cameron; CB Joe Haden; S T. J. Ward

The 2013 season was the Cleveland Browns' 61st in the National Football League (NFL) and their 65th overall. They failed to improve on their 5–11 record from 2012, finishing the year at 4–12, their sixth consecutive season with at least 11 losses. They also extended their franchise record playoff drought to 11 years. This was the first season under head coach Rob Chudzinski (who was later fired after the season) and new general manager Michael Lombardi (who was later fired in February 2014). This also marked the first full season under owner Jimmy Haslam. The Browns played all of their home games at the newly renamed FirstEnergy Stadium (formerly known as Cleveland Browns Stadium).

== Offseason ==
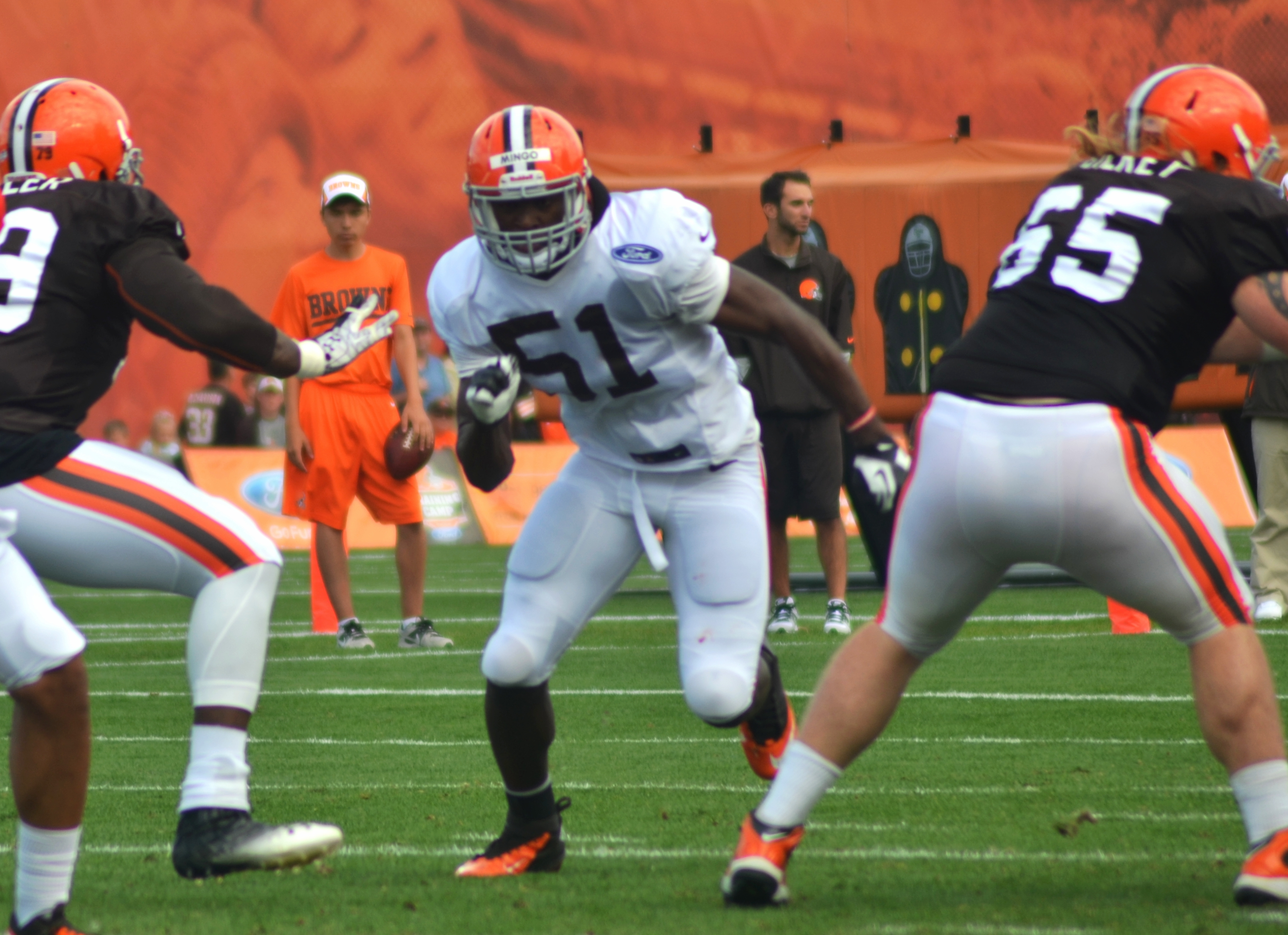
Barkevious Mingo during the Browns' 2013 training camp

=== Personnel changes ===
==== Front office changes ====
On December 31, 2012, the Browns fired general manager Tom Heckert.

==== Coaching staff changes ====
On December 31, 2012, the team fired head coach Pat Shurmur. In two seasons as Browns' head coach, Shurmur posted a record of 9–23, including a disappointing 2–10 mark within the division.

University of Oregon head coach Chip Kelly emerged as the favorite to replace Shurmur after a lengthy interview on January 4, however talks between the two sides broke down and Kelly decided to go to the Philadelphia Eagles.

On January 10, the Browns hired former Carolina Panthers' offensive coordinator Rob Chudzinski as head coach. Chudzinski, who spent the 2011 and 2012 seasons with the Panthers, also previously served as an assistant coach with the Browns and the San Diego Chargers.

Besides Chudzinski and Kelly, the Browns also interviewed former Arizona Cardinals' head coach Ken Whisenhunt and defensive coordinator Ray Horton, Syracuse University head coach Doug Marrone, Penn State head coach Bill O'Brien, Montreal Alouettes head coach and former Browns' assistant coach Marc Trestman, and Cincinnati Bengals' defensive coordinator Mike Zimmer.

On January 17, the Browns hired former San Diego Chargers' head coach Norv Turner as offensive coordinator. Turner, who served as Chargers' head coach from 2007 to 2012, was also the head coach of the Washington Redskins (1994–2000) and Oakland Raiders (2004–2005), and has served as an NFL coach in some capacity since 1985. Turner replaces Brad Childress.

On January 17, the Browns also added Mike Sullivan as offensive line coach, Scott Turner, the son of Norv Turner, as wide receivers coach, and Brad Roll as strength and conditioning coach.

On January 18, the Browns hired Horton, who previously interviewed for the head coaching position, as defensive coordinator. Horton, a former defensive back, has served as the Cardinals' defensive coordinator the past two seasons.

=== Roster changes ===
==== Free agency ====
| Pos | Player | Tag | Date signed | 2013 team |
|---|---|---|---|---|
| CB | Sheldon Brown | UFA | | |
| WR | Josh Cribbs | UFA | | Oakland Raiders |
| K | Phil Dawson | UFA | March 19 | San Francisco 49ers |
| LB | Auston English | ERFA | | |
| LB | Scott Fujita | UFA | April 23 | New Orleans Saints |
| P | Reggie Hodges | UFA | | |
| RB | Brandon Jackson | UFA | | Cleveland Browns |
| QB | Josh Johnson | UFA | March 21 | Cincinnati Bengals |
| LB | Kaluka Maiava | UFA | March 13 | Oakland Raiders |
| WR | Mohamed Massaquoi | UFA | April 5 | Jacksonville Jaguars |
| WR | Jordan Norwood | RFA | | Cleveland Browns |
| RB | Chris Ogbonnaya | ERFA | March 13 | Cleveland Browns |
| LB | Juqua Parker | UFA | | |
| TE | Alex Smith | UFA | April 16 | Cincinnati Bengals |
| LB | Emmanuel Stephens | ERFA | | |
| SS | Ray Ventrone | UFA | | San Francisco 49ers |
| TE | Benjamin Watson | UFA | March 18 | New Orleans Saints |
| FB | Eddie Williams | RFA | | |
| LS | Christian Yount | ERFA | | Cleveland Browns |

==== Releases ====
| Pos | Player | Released | Date signed | 2013 team |
|---|---|---|---|---|
| DE | Frostee Rucker | February 5 | March 21 | Arizona Cardinals |

==== Signings ====
| Pos | Player | Date signed | 2012 team |
|---|---|---|---|
| CB | Kevin Barnes | March 25 | Detroit Lions |
| TE | Gary Barnidge | March 13 | Carolina Panthers |
| DE | Desmond Bryant | March 13 | Oakland Raiders |
| QB | Jason Campbell | March 26 | Chicago Bears |
| TE | Kellen Davis | March 22 | Chicago Bears |
| K | Shayne Graham | April 15 | Houston Texans |
| OLB | Quentin Groves | March 13 | Arizona Cardinals |
| OLB | Paul Kruger | March 12 | Baltimore Ravens |
| P | Spencer Lanning | February 13 | Sacramento Mountain Lions (UFL) |
| CB | Chris Owens | March 22 | Atlanta Falcons |
| P | Jake Schum | March 29 | N/A |
| RB | Willis McGahee | September 18 | Denver Broncos |

==== Trades ====
- On April 1, the Browns traded QB Colt McCoy and a 2013 sixth-round draft pick to the San Francisco 49ers for a fifth- and a seventh-round draft pick in 2013.
- On April 11, the Browns traded LB Emmanuel Acho to the Philadelphia Eagles for RB Dion Lewis.
- On April 26, the Browns traded a 2013 fourth- and fifth-round draft pick to the Miami Dolphins for WR Davone Bess and a fourth- and seventh-round draft pick in 2013.
- On September 18, the Browns traded RB Trent Richardson to the Indianapolis Colts for a first-round pick in 2014.

==== 2013 draft class ====
2013 Cleveland Browns draft
| Round | Pick | Player | Position | College | Notes |
| 1 | 6 | Barkevious Mingo | OLB | LSU | |
| 3 | 68 | Leon McFadden | CB | San Diego State | |
| 6 | 175 | Jamoris Slaughter | S | Notre Dame | |
| 7 | 217 | Armonty Bryant | DE | East Central | Pick from MIA |
| 7 | 227 | Garrett Gilkey | OG | Chadron State | Pick from CIN |
Made roster † Pro Football Hall of Fame * Made at least one Pro Bowl during career

Notes

- The team forfeited its second-round selection (which would have been No. 39) after selecting wide receiver Josh Gordon in the 2012 Supplemental draft.
- The team acquired a 6th-round selection (No. 173) in a trade that sent safety David Sims and a 7th-round selection to the Philadelphia Eagles.
- The team acquired a 5th (No. 164) and 7th-round selection (No. 227) in a trade that sent quarterback Colt McCoy and a 6th-round selection (No. 173) to the San Francisco 49ers.
- The team acquired WR Davone Bess and a 4th (No. 111) and 7th (No. 217) round selection for a fourth (No. 104) and 5th (No. 164) round selection.
- The team traded its fourth-round selection (No. 111) to the Pittsburgh Steelers for a 2014 third-round selection.
- The team traded its fifth-round selection (No. 139) to the Indianapolis Colts for a 2014 fourth-round selection.

== Preseason ==
=== Schedule ===
| Week | Date | Opponent | Result | Record | Game site | NFL.com recap |
|---|---|---|---|---|---|---|
| 1 | August 8 | St. Louis Rams | W 27–19 | 1–0 | FirstEnergy Stadium | Recap |
| 2 | August 15 | Detroit Lions | W 24–6 | 2–0 | FirstEnergy Stadium | Recap |
| 3 | August 24 | at Indianapolis Colts | L 6–27 | 2–1 | Lucas Oil Stadium | Recap |
| 4 | August 29 | at Chicago Bears | W 18–16 | 3–1 | Soldier Field | Recap |

== Regular season ==
=== Schedule ===
| Week | Date | Opponent | Result | Record | Game site | NFL.com recap |
|---|---|---|---|---|---|---|
| 1 | September 8 | Miami Dolphins | **L** 10–23 | 0–1 | FirstEnergy Stadium | Recap |
| 2 | September 15 | at **Baltimore Ravens** | **L** 6–14 | 0–2 | M&T Bank Stadium | Recap |
| 3 | September 22 | at Minnesota Vikings | **W** 31–27 | 1–2 | Mall of America Field | Recap |
| 4 | September 29 | **Cincinnati Bengals** | **W** 17–6 | 2–2 | FirstEnergy Stadium | Recap |
| 5 | October 3 | Buffalo Bills | **W** 37–24 | 3–2 | FirstEnergy Stadium | Recap |
| 6 | October 13 | Detroit Lions | **L** 17–31 | 3–3 | FirstEnergy Stadium | Recap |
| 7 | October 20 | at Green Bay Packers | **L** 13–31 | 3–4 | Lambeau Field | Recap |
| 8 | October 27 | at Kansas City Chiefs | **L** 17–23 | 3–5 | Arrowhead Stadium | Recap |
| 9 | November 3 | **Baltimore Ravens** | **W** 24–18 | 4–5 | FirstEnergy Stadium | Recap |
| 10 | Bye | | | | | |
| 11 | November 17 | at **Cincinnati Bengals** | **L** 20–41 | 4–6 | Paul Brown Stadium | Recap |
| 12 | November 24 | **Pittsburgh Steelers** | **L** 11–27 | 4–7 | FirstEnergy Stadium | Recap |
| 13 | December 1 | Jacksonville Jaguars | **L** 28–32 | 4–8 | FirstEnergy Stadium | Recap |
| 14 | December 8 | at New England Patriots | **L** 26–27 | 4–9 | Gillette Stadium | Recap |
| 15 | December 15 | Chicago Bears | **L** 31–38 | 4–10 | FirstEnergy Stadium | Recap |
| 16 | December 22 | at New York Jets | **L** 13–24 | 4–11 | MetLife Stadium | Recap |
| 17 | December 29 | at **Pittsburgh Steelers** | **L** 7–20 | 4–12 | Heinz Field | Recap |

Note: Intra-division opponents are in bold text.

=== Game summaries ===
==== Week 1: vs. Miami Dolphins ====
Week One: Miami Dolphins at Cleveland Browns – Game summary

| Quarter | 1 | 2 | 3 | 4 | Total |
|---|---|---|---|---|---|
| **Dolphins** | 3 | 3 | 7 | 10 | **23** |
| Browns | 0 | 7 | 3 | 0 | **10** |

at FirstEnergy Stadium, Cleveland, Ohio

- Date: September 8
- Game time: 1:00 p.m. EDT
- Game weather: 72 °F (22 °C), (Sunny)
- Game attendance: 71,513
- Referee: Mike Carey
- TV announcers (CBS): Kevin Harlan and Solomon Wilcots
- Recap, Game book

Game information

**First quarter**

- MIA (1:29) – Caleb Sturgis 45 yd field goal
  **Dolphins 3, Browns 0** Drive: 15 plays, 58 yds, 7:17

**Second quarter**

- MIA (13:37) – Caleb Sturgis 49 yd field goal
  **Dolphins 6, Browns 0** Drive: 4 plays, −4 yds, 1:33
- CLE (0:28) – Jordan Cameron 7 yd pass from Brandon Weeden (Billy Cundiff kick)
  **Browns 7, Dolphins 6** Drive: 11 plays, 56 yds, 3:45

**Third quarter**

- MIA (6:46) – Brian Hartline 34 yd pass from Ryan Tannehill (Caleb Sturgis kick)
  **Dolphins 13, Browns 7** Drive: 5 plays, 51 yds, 2:10
- CLE (3:02) – Billy Cundiff 39 yd field goal
  **Dolphins 13, Browns 10** Drive: 9 plays, 59 yds, 3:44

**Fourth quarter**

- MIA (6:48) – Daniel Thomas 1 yd run (Caleb Sturgis kick)
  **Dolphins 20, Browns 10** Drive: 10 plays, 85 yds, 5:06
- MIA (3:59) – Caleb Sturgis 36 yd field goal
  **Dolphins 23, Browns 10** Drive: 4 plays, 7 yds, 1:34

**Top passers**

- MIA – Ryan Tannehill – 24/38, 272 yds, 1 TD, 1 INT
- CLE – Brandon Weeden – 26/53, 289 yds, 1 TD, 3 INT

**Top rushers**

- MIA – Daniel Thomas – 8 rush, 14 yds, 1 TD
- CLE – Trent Richardson – 13 rush, 47 yds

**Top receivers**

- MIA – Brian Hartline – 9 rec, 114 yds, 1 TD
- CLE – Jordan Cameron – 9 rec, 108 yds, 1 TD

**Top tacklers**

- MIA – Dimitri Patterson – 2 tackles, 2 INT
- CLE – D'Qwell Jackson – 9 tackles

The Browns opened their 2013 season at home against the Dolphins. The Dolphins struck first in the first quarter when Caleb Sturgis kicked a 45-yard field goal for a 3–0 lead. They increased their lead in the 2nd quarter when Sturgis nailed a 49-yard field goal for a 6–0 lead. The Browns got on the board and took the halftime lead 7–6 after Jordan Cameron caught a 7-yard TD pass from Brandon Weeden. The Dolphins retook the lead in the 3rd quarter when Brian Hartline caught a 34-yard TD pass from Ryan Tannehill to make the score 13–7. The Browns came within 3 as Billy Cundiff kicked a 39-yard field goal for a 13–10 game. In the 4th quarter, the Phins sealed the game as Daniel Thomas ran for a 1-yard TD for a 20–10 game followed up by Sturgis kicking a 36-yard field goal.

With the loss, the Browns start the season 0–1 and pick up their 9th straight regular season opening loss.

==== Week 2: at Baltimore Ravens ====
Week Two: Cleveland Browns at Baltimore Ravens – Game summary

| Quarter | 1 | 2 | 3 | 4 | Total |
|---|---|---|---|---|---|
| Browns | 3 | 3 | 0 | 0 | **6** |
| **Ravens** | 0 | 0 | 7 | 7 | **14** |

at M&T Bank Stadium, Baltimore, Maryland

- Date: September 15
- Game time: 1:00 pm. EDT
- Game weather: 75 °F (24 °C), partly cloudy
- Game attendance: 71,098
- Referee: Bill Vinovich
- TV announcers (CBS): Marv Albert and Rich Gannon
- Recap, Game book

Game information

**First quarter**

- CLE (8:42) – Billy Cundiff 21 yd field goal
  **Browns 3, Ravens 0** Drive: 5 plays, 57 yds, 2:27

**Second quarter**

- CLE (0:11) – Billy Cundiff 51 yd field goal
  **Browns 6, Ravens 0** Drive: 5 plays, 33 yds, 0:29

**Third quarter**

- BAL (5:18) – Bernard Pierce 5 yd run (Justin Tucker kick)
  **Ravens 7, Browns 6** Drive: 12 plays, 80 yds, 5:50

**Fourth quarter**

- BAL (9:03) – Marlon Brown 5 yd pass from Joe Flacco (Justin Tucker kick)
  **Ravens 14, Browns 6** Drive: 8 plays. 42 yds, 3:20

**Top passers**

- CLE – Brandon Weeden – 21/33, 227 yds
- BAL – Joe Flacco – 22/33, 211 yds, 1 TD

**Top rushers**

- CLE – Trent Richardson – 18 carr, 58 yds
- BAL – Bernard Pierce – 19 carr, 57 yds, 1 TD

**Top receivers**

- CLE – Jordan Cameron 5 rec, 95 yds
- BAL – Torrey Smith – 7 rec, 85 yds

**Top tacklers**

- CLE – Buster Skrine – 9 tackles
- BAL – Daryl Smith – 11 tackles, 1.5 sacks

After a tough loss at home, the Browns traveled to Baltimore to take on the Ravens. The Browns scored all the points in the first half; both of them with field goals in both quarters from Billy Cundiff from 21 yards out in the first quarter and 51 yards out in the 2nd making the score 3–0 and eventual halftime score 6–0. The Ravens got on the board in the 3rd quarter as Bernard Pierce ran for a 5-yard TD to take the lead 7–6. In the 4th quarter, the Ravens moved ahead by 8 as Joe Flacco found Marion Brown on a 5-yard TD pass for a final score of 14–6.

With the loss, the Browns dropped to 0–2. The team also lost their 11th straight game against the Ravens.

==== Week 3: at Minnesota Vikings ====
Week Three: Cleveland Browns at Minnesota Vikings – Game summary

| Quarter | 1 | 2 | 3 | 4 | Total |
|---|---|---|---|---|---|
| **Browns** | 7 | 17 | 0 | 7 | **31** |
| Vikings | 7 | 10 | 7 | 3 | **27** |

at Mall of America Field at the Hubert H. Humphrey Metrodome, Minneapolis, Minnesota

- Date: September 22
- Game time: 1:00 pm. EDT/12:00 p.m. CDT
- Game weather: Played indoors (domed stadium)
- Game attendance: 63,672
- Referee: Bill Leavy
- TV announcers (CBS): Kevin Harlan and Solomon Wilcots
- Recap, Game book

Game information

**First quarter**

- MIN (9:13) – Adrian Peterson 2 yd run (Blair Walsh kick)
  **Vikings 7, Browns 0** Drive: 11 plays, 80 yds, 5:47
- CLE (4:42) – Josh Gordon 47 yd pass from Brian Hoyer (Billy Cundiff kick)
  **Vikings 7, Browns 7** Drive: 6 plays, 68 yds, 2:13

**Second quarter**

- CLE (14:55) – Jordan Cameron 19 yd pass from Brian Hoyer (Billy Cundiff kick)
  **Browns 14, Vikings 7** Drive: 7 plays, 82 yds, 3:21
- MIN (10:12) – Christian Ponder 6 yd run (Blair Walsh kick)
  **Browns 14, Vikings 14** Drive: 9 plays, 80 yds, 4:40
- CLE (6:08) – Billy Cundiff 38 yd field goal
  **Browns 17, Vikings 14** Drive: 9 plays, 60 yds, 4:05
- CLE (3:39) – Jordan Cameron 11 yd pass from Spencer Lanning (Billy Cundiff kick)
  **Browns 24, Vikings 14** Drive: 6 plays, 38 yds, 1:33
- MIN (1:08) – Blair Walsh 43 yd field goal
  **Browns 24, Vikings 17** Drive: 4 plays, 1 yd, 1:20

**Third quarter**

- MIN (2:36) – Christian Ponder 8 yd run (Blair Walsh kick)
  **Browns 24, Vikings 24** Drive: 3 plays, 9 yds, 0:49

**Fourth quarter**

- MIN (10:30) – Blair Walsh 30 yd field goal
  **Vikings 27, Browns 24** Drive: 13 plays, 60 yds, 5:11
- CLE (0:51) – Jordan Cameron 7 yd pass from Brian Hoyer (Spencer Lanning kick)
  **Browns 31, Vikings 27** Drive: 11 plays, 55 yds, 2:30

**Top passers**

- CLE – Brian Hoyer – 30/54, 321 yds, 3 TD, 3 INT
- MIN – Christian Ponder – 25/42, 228 yds, 1 INT

**Top rushers**

- CLE – Josh Aubrey – 1 carr, 34 yds
- MIN – Adrian Peterson – 25 carr, 88 yds, 1 TD

**Top receivers**

- CLE – Josh Gordon – 10 rec, 146 yds, 1 TD
- MIN – Cordarrelle Patterson – 2 rec, 49 yds

**Top tacklers**

- CLE – T. J. Ward – 8 tackles, 1 INT
- MIN – Erin Henderson – 8 tackles, 2 sacks, 1 INT

After a tough road loss, the Browns traveled northwest to take on the Vikings. The Vikes would score first as AP ran for a 2-yard TD for a 7–0 lead. The Browns managed to tie it as 2nd-string QB Brian Hoyer found Josh Gordon on a 47-yard TD pass for a 7–7 game. The Browns took the lead in the 2nd quarter as Hoyer found Jordan Cameron for a 19-yard TD pass and a 14–7 lead. The Vikes tied the game as Christian Ponder ran for a 6-yard TD to make the score 14–14. The Browns moved back into the lead as Billy Cundiff kicked a 38-yard field goal for a 17–14 lead and increased it with a trick play as Spencer Lanning found Cameron on an 11-yard TD pass for increasing the score to 24–14. Blair Walsh managed to get the Vikes within 7 after he kicked a 43-yard field goal for a 24–17 halftime lead. After the break, Ponder ran for another TD from 8 yards out tying the game 24–24. They retook the lead in the 4th quarter as Walsh nailed a 30-yard field goal for a 27–24 lead. Hoyer found Cameron with less than a minute left in the game for a final score of 31–27.

With the win, not only did the Browns improve to 1–2, but they also snapped a 7-game losing streak against NFC teams.

==== Week 4: vs. Cincinnati Bengals ====
Week Four: Cincinnati Bengals at Cleveland Browns – Game summary

| Quarter | 1 | 2 | 3 | 4 | Total |
|---|---|---|---|---|---|
| Bengals | 0 | 3 | 3 | 0 | **6** |
| **Browns** | 7 | 0 | 3 | 7 | **17** |

at FirstEnergy Stadium, Cleveland, Ohio

- Date: September 29
- Game time: 1:00 pm. EDT
- Game weather: 68 °F (20 °C), cloudy
- Game attendance: 71,481
- Referee: Ron Winter
- TV announcers (CBS): Marv Albert and Rich Gannon
- Recap, Game book

Game information

**First quarter**

- CLE (2:13) – Jordan Cameron 2 yd pass from Brian Hoyer (Billy Cundiff kick)
  **Browns 7, Bengals 0** Drive: 12 plays, 95 yds, 6:29

**Second quarter**

- CIN (10:48) – Mike Nugent 25 yd field goal
  **Browns 7, Bengals 3** Drive: 13 plays, 46 yds, 6:25

**Third quarter**

- CLE (5:10) – Billy Cundiff 51 yd field goal
  **Browns 10, Bengals 3** Drive: 10 plays, 17 yds, 3:25
- CIN (0:37) – Mike Nugent 43 yd field goal
  **Browns 10, Bengals 6** Drive: 10 plays, 62 yds, 4:33

**Fourth quarter**

- CLE (4:59) – Chris Ogbonnaya 1 yd pass from Brian Hoyer (Billy Cundiff kick)
  **Browns 17, Bengals 6** Drive: 12 plays, 91 yds, 6:37

**Top passers**

- CIN – Andy Dalton – 23/41, 206 yds, 1 INT
- CLE – Brian Hoyer – 25/38, 269 yds, 2 TD

**Top rushers**

- CIN – Giovani Bernard – 10 carr, 37 yds
- CLE – Willis McGahee – 15 carr, 46 yds

**Top receivers**

- CIN – Jermaine Gresham – 3 rec, 53 yds
- CLE – Jordan Cameron – 10 rec, 91 yds, 1 TD

**Top tacklers**

- CIN – Vontaze Burfict – 14 tackles
- CLE – D'Qwell Jackson – 10 tackles

After a tough win over the Vikings, the Browns returned home for a game against the Bengals in Round 1 of the Battle of Ohio. In the first quarter, the Browns scored first as Brian Hoyer found Jordan Cameron on a 2-yard pass for a 7–0 lead. In the second quarter, the Bengals scored when Mike Nugent nailed a 25-yard field goal for the eventual halftime score of 7–3. In the third quarter, the Browns scored a field goal of their own when Billy Cundiff nailed one from 51 yards out giving them a 10–3 lead. The Bengals once again came within 4 as Nugent kicked another field goal from 46 yards out for a 10–6 game. In the fourth quarter, it was all Browns as Hoyer found Chris Ogbonnaya on a 1-yard pass for the eventual final score of 17–6.

With the win, the Browns improved to 2–2.

==== Week 5: vs. Buffalo Bills ====
Week Five: Buffalo Bills at Cleveland Browns – Game summary

| Quarter | 1 | 2 | 3 | 4 | Total |
|---|---|---|---|---|---|
| Bills | 10 | 0 | 14 | 0 | **24** |
| **Browns** | 0 | 17 | 7 | 13 | **37** |

at FirstEnergy Stadium, Cleveland, Ohio

- Date: October 3
- Game time: 8:25 pm. EDT
- Game weather: 75 °F (24 °C), cloudy
- Game attendance: 71,239
- Referee: Pete Morelli
- TV announcers (NFLN): Brad Nessler, Mike Mayock and Alex Flanagan
- Recap, Game book

Game information

**First quarter**

- BUF (13:21) – Fred Jackson 1 yd run (Dan Carpenter kick)
  **Bills 7, Browns 0** Drive: 2 plays, 32 yds, 0:44
- BUF (5:55) – Dan Carpenter 52 yd field goal
  **Bills 10, Browns 0** Drive: 12 plays, 56 yds, 4:14

**Second quarter**

- CLE (14:24) – Billy Cundiff 33 yd field goal
  **Bills 10, Browns 3** Drive: 7 plays, 19 yds, 2:12
- CLE (3:52) – Willis McGahee 1 yd run (Billy Cundiff kick)
  **Bills 10, Browns 10** Drive: 14 plays, 74 yds, 7:10
- CLE (2:20) – Travis Benjamin 79 yd punt return (Billy Cundiff kick)
  **Browns 17, Bills 10**

**Third quarter**

- BUF (13:51) – C. J. Spiller 54 yd run (Dan Carpenter kick)
  **Browns 17, Bills 17** Drive: 3 plays, 80 yds, 1:09
- BUF (6:32) – Fred Jackson 1 yd run (Dan Carpenter kick)
  **Bills 24, Browns 17** Drive: 12 plays, 54 yds, 5:15
- CLE (5:35) – Josh Gordon 37 yd pass from Brandon Weeden (Billy Cundiff kick)
  **Bills 24, Browns 24** Drive: 2 plays, 74 yds. 0:57

**Fourth quarter**

- CLE (12:31) – Billy Cundiff 24 yd field goal
  **Browns 27, Bills 24** Drive: 10 plays, 26 yds, 4:32
- CLE (2:19) – Billy Cundiff 44 yd field goal
  **Browns 30, Bills 24** Drive: 8 plays, 31 yds, 4:41
- CLE (1:44) – T. J. Ward 44 yd interception return (Billy Cundiff kick)
  **Browns 37, Bills 24**

**Top passers**

- BUF – EJ Manuel – 11/20, 129 yds
- CLE – Brandon Weeden – 13/24, 197 yds, 1 TD

**Top rushers**

- BUF – C. J. Spiller – 8 carr, 66 yds, 1 TD
- CLE – Willis McGahee – 26 carr, 72 yds, 1 TD

**Top receivers**

- BUF – Robert Woods – 5 rec, 64 yds
- CLE – Josh Gordon – 4 rec, 86 yds, 1 TD

**Top tacklers**

- BUF – Kiko Alonso – 12 tackles
- CLE – T. J. Ward – 5 tackles, 1 INT, 1 TD

After a win over the Bengals, the Browns stayed home for a Thursday Night duel against the Bills. The Bills scored first when Fred Jackson ran for a 1-yard touchdown for a 7–0 lead followed up by Dan Carpenter nailing a 52-yard field goal increasing their lead to 10–0. In the second quarter, it was all Browns as Billy Cundiff kicked a 33-yard field goal for a 10–3 game. They eventually tied the game up and moved into the lead when Willis McGahee ran for a 1-yard touchdown for a 10–10 game followed up by Travis Benjamein returning a punt 79 yards for a touchdown for a halftime score of 17–10. In the third quarter, the Bills tied it up and took the lead back when C.J. Spiller ran for a 54-yard touchdown for a 17–17 game followed up by McGahee running for another 1-yard touchdown for a 24–17 lead. The Browns however later on in the quarter, tied it back up as Brandon Weeden hooked up with Josh Gordon for a 37-yard pass for a 24–24 game. In the fourth quarter, it was all Browns as Cundiff made field goals from 24 and 44 yards out for leads of 27–24 and 30–24 before sealing the game when T.J. Ward returned an interception 44 yards for a touchdown and for the final score of 37–24.

With their 3rd straight win, the Browns improved to 3–2.

==== Week 6: vs. Detroit Lions ====
Week Six: Detroit Lions at Cleveland Browns – Game summary

| Quarter | 1 | 2 | 3 | 4 | Total |
|---|---|---|---|---|---|
| **Lions** | 7 | 0 | 7 | 17 | **31** |
| Browns | 0 | 17 | 0 | 0 | **17** |

at FirstEnergy Stadium, Cleveland, Ohio

- Date: October 13
- Game time: 1:00 pm. EDT
- Game weather: 66 °F (19 °C), cloudy
- Game attendance: 71,513
- Referee: Walt Coleman
- TV announcers (Fox): Tom McCarthy, Heath Evans and Lisa Byington
- Recap, Game book

Game information

**First quarter**

- DET (3:27) – Joseph Fauria 1 yd pass from Matthew Stafford (David Akers kick)
  **Lions 7, Browns 0** Drive: 9 plays, 58 yds, 4:23

**Second quarter**

- CLE (12:52) – Chris Ogbonnaya 4 yd pass from Brandon Weeden (Billy Cundiff kick)
  **Lions 7, Browns 7** Drive: 8 plays, 74 yds, 3:40
- CLE (1:16) – Greg Little 2 yd pass from Brandon Weeden (Billy Cundiff kick)
  **Browns 14, Lions 7** Drive: 9 plays, 84 yds, 5:22
- CLE (0:08) – Billy Cundiff 40 yd field goal
  **Browns 17, Lions 7** Drive: 6 plays, 52 yds, 0:47

**Third quarter**

- DET (8:57) – Reggie Bush 18 yd pass from Matthew Stafford (David Akers kick)
  **Browns 17, Lions 14** Drive: 8 plays, 79 yds, 3:59

**Fourth quarter**

- DET (10:35) – Joseph Fauria 23 yd pass from Matthew Stafford (David Akers kick)
  **Lions 21, Browns 17** Drive: 8 plays, 67 yds, 4:14
- DET (6:04) – David Akers 51 yd field goal
  **Lions 24, Browns 17** Drive: 6 plays, 26 yds, 2:53
- DET (2:01) – Joseph Fauria 10 yd pass from Matthew Stafford (David Akers kick)
  **Lions 31, Browns 17** Drive: 7 plays, 49 yds, 2:35

**Top passers**

- DET – Matthew Stafford – 25/43, 248 yds, 4 TD, 1 INT
- CLE – Brandon Weeden – 24/41, 279 yds, 2 TD, 2 INT

**Top rushers**

- DET – Reggie Bush – 17 carr, 78 yds
- CLE – Travis Benjamin – 1 carr, 45 yds

**Top receivers**

- DET – Kris Durham – 8 rec, 83 yds
- CLE – Josh Gordon – 7 rec, 126 yds

**Top tacklers**

- DET – DeAndre Levy – 6 tackles, 2 INT
- CLE – T. J. Ward – 11 tackles

After a big win over the Bills, the Browns would remain at home for the third week in a row this time taking on the Lions. The Lions scored first in the first quarter when Joseph Fauria caught a 1-yard pass from Matthew Stafford for a 7–0 lead. In the second quarter, it was all Browns when Brandon Weeden found Chris Ogbonnaya on a 4-yard pass tying the game up 7–7 and taking the lead when Weeden found Greg Little on a 2-yard pass for a 14–7 lead. This was followed up by Billy Cundiff nailing a 40-yard field goal as the Browns lead 17–7 at halftime. In the second half however, it was all Lions starting in the third quarter when Stafford found Reggie Bush on an 18-yard pass to come within 3, 17–14. In the fourth quarter, they took the lead back when Stafford found Fauria on a 23-yard pass for a 21–17 lead followed up by David Akers nailing a 51-yard field goal for a 24–17 lead and finally Stafford and Fauria hooking up again on a 10-yard pass for the final score of 31–17.

With their 3-game winning streak snapped, the Browns fell to 3–3.

==== Week 7: at Green Bay Packers ====
Week Seven: Cleveland Browns at Green Bay Packers – Game summary

| Quarter | 1 | 2 | 3 | 4 | Total |
|---|---|---|---|---|---|
| Browns | 0 | 3 | 3 | 7 | **13** |
| **Packers** | 14 | 3 | 0 | 14 | **31** |

at Lambeau Field, Green Bay, Wisconsin

- Date: October 20
- Game time: 4:25 pm. EDT/3:25 pm. CDT
- Game weather: 46 °F (8 °C), rain
- Game attendance: 77,804
- Referee: Jeff Triplette
- TV announcers (CBS): Kevin Harlan and Solomon Wilcots
- Recap, Game book

Game information

**First quarter**

- GB (12:22) – Jermichael Finley 10 yd pass from Aaron Rodgers (Mason Crosby kick)
  **Packers 7, Browns 0** Drive: 4 plays, 40 yds, 1:38
- GB (3:44) – Eddie Lacy 1 yd run (Mason Crosby kick)
  **Packers 14, Browns 0** Drive: 11 plays, 56 yds, 5:49

**Second quarter**

- CLE (5:11) – Billy Cundiff 46 yd field goal
  **Packers 14, Browns 3** Drive: 12 plays, 60 yds, 6:25
- GB (0:03) – Mason Crosby 26 yd field goal
  **Packers 17, Browns 3** Drive: 14 plays, 61 yds, 5:08

**Third quarter**

- CLE (5:03) – Billy Cundiff 44 yd field goal
  **Packers 17, Browns 6** Drive: 7 plays, 20 yds, 1:45

**Fourth quarter**

- GB (8:30) – Jordy Nelson 1 yd pass from Aaron Rodgers (Mason Crosby kick)
  **Packers 24, Browns 6** Drive: 5 plays, 69 yds, 2:39
- CLE (6:09) – Jordan Cameron 2 yd pass from Brandon Weeden (Billy Cundiff kick)
  **Packers 24, Browns 13** Drive: 7 plays, 20 yds, 2:21
- GB (3:44) – Jarrett Boykin 20 yd pass from Aaron Rodgers (Mason Crosby kick)
  **Packers 31, Browns 13** Drive: 4 plays, 54 yds, 2:23

**Top passers**

- CLE – Brandon Weeden – 17/42, 149 yds, 1 TD, 1 INT
- GB – Aaron Rodgers – 25/36, 260 yds, 3 TD

**Top rushers**

- CLE – Willis McGahee – 11 carr, 39 yds
- GB – Eddie Lacy – 22 carr, 82 yds, 1 TD

**Top receivers**

- CLE – Jordan Cameron – 7 rec, 55 yds, 1 TD
- GB – Jarrett Boykin – 8 rec, 103 yds, 1 TD

**Top tacklers**

- CLE – T. J. Ward – 11 tackles
- GB – Jamari Lattimore – 12 tackles, 1 sack

After a tough loss at home, the Browns traveled to take on the Packers. In the first quarter, it was all Packers as Aaron Rodgers found Jermichael Finley on a 10-yard pass taking a 7–0 lead followed up by Eddie Lacy running for a 1-yard touchdown for a 14–0 lead. In the second quarter, the Browns got on the board as Billy Cundiff kicked a 46-yard field goal 14–3 game. Though the Packers moved ahead by 2 touchdowns at halftime when Mason Crosby nailed a 26-yard field goal for a 17–3 game. In the third quarter, the Browns would score the only points when Cundiff kicked another field goal this time from 44 yards out for a 17–6 game. In the fourth quarter, the Packers went back to work as Rodgers found Jordy Nelson on a 1-yard pass for a 24–6 game. The Browns came within 11 again as Brandon Weeden found Jordan Cameron on a 2-yard pass for a 24–13 game. The Packers would later on seal the game when Rodgers found Jarrett Boykin on a 20-yard pass for the eventual final score 31–13.

With the loss, the Browns dropped to 3–4.

==== Week 8: at Kansas City Chiefs ====
Week Eight: Cleveland Browns at Kansas City Chiefs – Game summary

| Quarter | 1 | 2 | 3 | 4 | Total |
|---|---|---|---|---|---|
| Browns | 0 | 10 | 7 | 0 | **17** |
| **Chiefs** | 6 | 14 | 0 | 3 | **23** |

at Arrowhead Stadium, Kansas City, Missouri

- Date: October 27
- Game time: 1:00 pm. EDT/12:00 pm. CDT
- Game weather: 52 °F (11 °C), sunny, clear
- Game attendance: 74,307
- Referee: Clete Blakeman
- TV announcers (CBS): Ian Eagle and Dan Fouts
- Recap, Game book

Game information

**First quarter**

- KC (11:22) – Ryan Succop 42 yd field goal
  **Chiefs 3, Browns 0** Drive: 9 plays, 64 yds, 3:38
- KC (4:46) – Ryan Succop 35 yd field goal
  **Chiefs 6, Browns 0** Drive: 11 plays, 47 yds, 5:04

**Second quarter**

- KC (10:26) – Anthony Sherman 12 yd pass from Alex Smith (Ryan Succop kick)
  **Chiefs 13, Browns 0** Drive: 14 plays, 82 yds, 7:34
- CLE (2:44) – Josh Gordon 39 yd pass from Jason Campbell (Billy Cundiff kick)
  **Chiefs 13, Browns 7** Drive: 2 plays, 58 yds, 0:52
- KC (1:11) – Dexter McCluster 28 yd pass from Alex Smith (Ryan Succop kick)
  **Chiefs 20, Browns 7** Drive: 6 plays, 75 yds, 1:33
- CLE (0:10) – Billy Cundiff 44 yd field goal
  **Chiefs 20, Browns 10** Drive: 7 plays, 54 yds, 1:01

**Third quarter**

- CLE (9:58) – Fozzy Whittaker 17 yd pass from Jason Campbell (Billy Cundiff kick)
  **Chiefs 20, Browns 17** Drive: 9 plays, 80 yds, 5:02

**Fourth quarter**

- KC (0:17) – Ryan Succop 40 yd field goal
  **Chiefs 23, Browns 17** Drive: 4 plays, 9 yds, 1:44

**Top passers**

- CLE – Jason Campbell – 22/36, 293 yds, 2 TD
- KC – Alex Smith – 24/36, 225 yds, 2 TD

**Top rushers**

- CLE – Willis McGahee – 9 carr, 28 yds
- KC – Jamaal Charles – 18 carr, 74 yds

**Top receivers**

- CLE – Josh Gordon – 5 rec, 132 yds, 1 TD
- KC – Dexter McCluster – 7 rec, 67 yds, 1 TD

**Top tacklers**

- CLE – T. J. Ward – 10 tackles, 1 sack
- KC – Derrick Johnson – 12 tackles

After a tough loss on the road, the Browns traveled again to take on the Chiefs. In the first quarter, it was all Chiefs as Ryan Succop nailed 2 field goals from 42 and 35 yards out for leads of 3–0 and 6–0. In the second quarter, Alex Smith found Anthony Sherman on a 12-yard pass for a 13–0 game. The Browns finally got on the board when Jason Campbell found Josh Gordon on a 39-yard pass for a 13–7 game. Though the Chiefs pulled away as Smith found Dexter McCluster on a 28-yard pass for a 20–7 lead. The Browns wrapped things up with Billy Cundiff's 44-yard field goal giving the Chiefs a 20–10 lead at halftime. In the third quarter the Browns came within 3 when Campbell found Fozzy Whittaker on a 17-yard pass for a 20–17 game for the only score of the period. In the fourth quarter, the Chiefs wrapped the scoring up when Succop nailed a 40-yard field goal for the eventual final score of 23–17.

With the loss and 3-game losing streak, the Browns dropped to 3–5.

==== Week 9: vs. Baltimore Ravens ====
Week Nine: Baltimore Ravens at Cleveland Browns – Game summary

| Quarter | 1 | 2 | 3 | 4 | Total |
|---|---|---|---|---|---|
| Ravens | 3 | 7 | 0 | 8 | **18** |
| **Browns** | 7 | 7 | 7 | 3 | **24** |

at FirstEnergy Stadium, Cleveland, Ohio

- Date: November 3
- Game time: 4:25 pm. EST
- Game weather: 46 °F (8 °C), sunny
- Game attendance: 71,513
- Referee: Scott Green
- TV announcers (CBS): Kevin Harlan and Solomon Wilcots
- Recap, Game book

Game information

**First quarter**

- CLE (8:24) – Davone Bess 1 yd pass from Jason Campbell (Billy Cundiff kick)
  **Browns 7, Ravens 0** Drive: 8 plays, 80 yds, 3:41
- BAL (3:38) – Justin Tucker 51 yd field goal
  **Browns 7, Ravens 3** Drive: 11 plays, 47 yds, 4:46

**Second quarter**

- CLE (10:08) – Davone Bess 20 yd pass from Jason Campbell (Billy Cundiff kick)
  **Browns 14, Ravens 3** Drive: 9 plays, 53 yds, 3:55
- BAL (0:09) – Marlon Brown 19 yd pass from Joe Flacco (Justin Tucker kick)
  **Browns 14, Ravens 10** Drive: 5 plays, 67 yds, 0:52

**Third quarter**

- CLE (5:11) – Gary Barnidge 4 pass from Jason Campbell (Billy Cundiff kick)
  **Browns 21, Ravens 10** Drive: 2 plays, 11 yds, 0:39

**Fourth quarter**

- BAL (12:09) – Marlon Brown 19 yd pass from Joe Flacco (Joe Flacco pass to Marlon Brown)
  **Browns 21, Ravens 18** Drive: 5 plays, 32 yds, 2:38
- CLE (0:14) – Billy Cundiff 22 yd field goal
  **Browns 24, Ravens 18** Drive: 15 plays, 67 yds, 6:30

**Top passers**

- BAL – Joe Flacco – 24/41, 250 yds, 2 TD, 1 INT
- CLE – Jason Campbell – 23/35, 262 yds, 3 TD

**Top rushers**

- BAL – Joe Flacco – 3 carr, 25 yds
- CLE – Willis McGahee – 21 carr, 31 yds

**Top receivers**

- BAL – Torrey Smith – 5 rec, 78 yds
- CLE – Greg Little – 7 rec, 122 yds

**Top tacklers**

- BAL – Daryl Smith – 9 tackles, 1 sack
- CLE – Chris Owens – 9 tackles, 1 sack

After a tough loss on the road, the Browns returned home to take on the Ravens. They would score first in the first quarter when Jason Campbell found Davone Bess on a 1-yard pass for a 7–0 lead. The Ravens would shorten the lead when Justin Tucker nailed a 51-yard field goal to make it 7–3. In the second quarter, the Browns moved ahead by double digits when Campbell found Bess again this time on a 20-yard pass for a 14–3 lead. The Ravens came within 4 again when Joe Flacco found Marlon Brown on a 19-yard pass for a 14–10 game at halftime. In the third quarter, the Browns moved ahead by double digits again when Campbell found Gary Barnidge on a 4-yard pass to lead 21–10 for the quarter's only score. In the fourth quarter, the Ravens drew closer as Flacco found Brown again on a 7-yard pass for a 21–18 game. Though later on, the Browns wrapped up the scoring when Billy Cundiff kicked a 22-yard field goal for a 24–18 final score.

With the win and 3-game losing streak snapped, the Browns went into their bye week 4–5. They would also defeat the Ravens for the first time since 2007 and also snapped their 11-game losing streak against them.

==== Week 11: at Cincinnati Bengals ====
Week Eleven: Cleveland Browns at Cincinnati Bengals – Game summary

| Quarter | 1 | 2 | 3 | 4 | Total |
|---|---|---|---|---|---|
| Browns | 13 | 0 | 7 | 0 | **20** |
| **Bengals** | 0 | 31 | 0 | 10 | **41** |

at Paul Brown Stadium, Cincinnati, Ohio

- Date: November 17
- Game time: 1:00 pm. EST
- Game weather: 62 °F (17 °C), cloudy
- Game attendance: 63,856
- Referee: Carl Cheffers
- TV announcers (CBS): Marv Albert and Rich Gannon
- Recap, Game book

Game information

**First quarter**

- CLE (4:10) – Billy Cundiff 20 yd field goal
  **Browns 3, Bengals 0** Drive: 11 plays, 79 yds, 4:51
- CLE (3:04) – Billy Cundiff 28 yd field goal
  **Browns 6, Bengals 0** Drive: 4 plays, 4 yds, 0:58
- CLE (2:19) – Joe Haden 29 yd interception return (Billy Cundiff kick)
  **Browns 13, Bengals 0**

**Second quarter**

- CIN (14:52) – Jermaine Gresham 25 yd pass from Andy Dalton (Mike Nugent kick)
  **Browns 13, Bengals 7** Drive: 2 plays, 22 yds, 0:52
- CIN (11:49) – Mohamed Sanu 6 yd pass from Andy Dalton (Mike Nugent kick)
  **Bengals 14, Browns 13** Drive: 5 plays, 38 yds, 1:34
- CIN (4:35) – Tony Dye 24 yd blocked punt return (Mike Nugent kick)
  **Bengals 21, Browns 13**
- CIN (2:45) – Vontaze Burfict 13 yd fumble return (Mike Nugent kick)
  **Bengals 28. Browns 13**
- CIN (0:01) – Mike Nugent 41 yd field goal
  **Bengals 31, Browns 13** Drive: 4 plays, 9 yds, 0:19

**Third quarter**

- CLE (9:29) – Josh Gordon 74 yd pass from Jason Campbell (Billy Cundiff kick)
  **Bengals 31, Browns 20** Drive: 2 plays, 79 yds, 0:46

**Fourth quarter**

- CIN (11:55) – Alex Smith 2 yd pass from Andy Dalton (Mike Nugent kick)
  **Bengals 38, Browns 20** Drive: 7 plays, 52 yds, 3:27
- CIN (8:09) – Mike Nugent 38 yd field goal
  **Bengals 41, Browns 20** Drive: 4 plays, 1 yd, 2:44

**Top passers**

- CLE – Jason Campbell – 27/56, 248 yds, 1 TD, 3 INT
- CIN – Andy Dalton – 13/27, 93 yds, 3 TD, 2 INT

**Top rushers**

- CLE – Chris Ogbonnaya – 8 carr, 69 yds
- CIN – BenJarvus Green-Ellis – 16 carr, 62 yds

**Top receivers**

- CLE – Josh Gordon – 5 rec, 125 yds, 1 TD
- CIN – Giovani Bernard – 4 rec, 41 yds

**Top tacklers**

- CLE – Joe Haden – 2 tackles, 2 INT, 1 TD
- CIN – Vontaze Burfict – 15 tackles, fumble return TD

The Browns came back from their bye week and traveled to Cincinnati to take on the Bengals in the year's Battle of Ohio Round 2. The Browns put up 13 points in the first quarter before the Bengals put up 31 in the second quarter and led 31–13 at halftime. They tried to rally in the third quarter coming within 11, 31–20. But 10 points in the fourth quarter would assure the game for the Bengals as they would win 41–20.

With the loss, the Browns fell to 4–6.

==== Week 12: vs. Pittsburgh Steelers ====
Week Twelve: Pittsburgh Steelers at Cleveland Browns – Game summary

| Quarter | 1 | 2 | 3 | 4 | Total |
|---|---|---|---|---|---|
| **Steelers** | 3 | 10 | 7 | 7 | **27** |
| Browns | 3 | 0 | 0 | 8 | **11** |

at FirstEnergy Stadium, Cleveland, Ohio

- Date: November 24
- Game time: 1:00 pm. EST
- Game weather: 20 °F (−7 °C), cold, snow
- Game attendance: 71,513
- Referee: Terry McAulay
- TV announcers (CBS): Kevin Harlan and Solomon Wilcots
- Recap, Game book

Game information

**First quarter**

- PIT (10:03) – Shaun Suisham 47 yd field goal
  **Steelers 3, Browns 0** Drive: 9 plays, 45 yds, 4:57
- CLE (7:21) – Billy Cundiff 49 yd field goal
  **Steelers 3, Browns 3** Drive: 7 plays, 29 yds, 2:38

**Second quarter**

- PIT (2:33) – Antonio Brown 41 yd pass from Ben Roethlisberger (Shaun Suisham kick)
  **Steelers 10, Browns 3** Drive: 2 plays, 52 yds, 0:44
- PIT (0:07) – Shaun Suisham 32 yd field goal
  **Steelers 13, Browns 3** Drive: 8 plays, 40 yds, 1:36

**Third quarter**

- PIT (7:43) – Emmanuel Sanders 4 yd pass from Ben Roethlisberger (Shaun Suisham kick)
  **Steelers 20, Browns 3** Drive: 1 play, 4 yds, 0:03

**Fourth quarter**

- PIT (4:27) – William Gay 21 yd interception return (Shaun Suisham kick)
  **Steelers 27, Browns 3**
- CLE (3:13) – Josh Gordon 1 yd pass from Brandon Weeden (Weeden pass to Davone Bess)
  **Steelers 27, Browns 11** Drive: 6 plays, 78 yds, 1:14

**Top passers**

- PIT – Ben Roethlisberger – 22/34, 217 yds, 2 TD
- CLE – Brandon Weeden – 13/30, 209 yds, 1 TD, 1 INT

**Top rushers**

- PIT – Le'Veon Bell – 23 carr, 80 yds
- CLE – Chris Ogbonnaya – 4 carr, 26 yds

**Top receivers**

- PIT – Antonio Brown – 6 rec, 92 yds, 1 TD
- CLE – Josh Gordon – 14 rec, 237 yds, 1 TD

**Top tacklers**

- PIT – William Gay – 3 tackles, 1 sack, 1 INT, 1 TD
- CLE – T. J. Ward – 9 tackles

==== Week 13: vs. Jacksonville Jaguars ====
Week Thirteen: Jacksonville Jaguars at Cleveland Browns – Game summary

| Quarter | 1 | 2 | 3 | 4 | Total |
|---|---|---|---|---|---|
| **Jaguars** | 7 | 13 | 0 | 12 | **32** |
| Browns | 7 | 7 | 7 | 7 | **28** |

at FirstEnergy Stadium, Cleveland, Ohio

- Date: December 1
- Game time: 1:00 pm. EST
- Game weather: 40 °F (4 °C), overcast
- Game attendance: 69,654
- Referee: Bill Leavy
- TV announcers (CBS): Kevin Harlan and Solomon Wilcots
- Recap, Game book

Game information

**First quarter**

- CLE (10:51) – Willis McGahee 1 yd run (Billy Cundiff kick)
  **Browns 7, Jaguars 0** Drive: 3 plays, 47 yds, 1:07
- JAC (7:04) – Clay Harbor 18 yd pass from Chad Henne (Josh Scobee kick)
  **Browns 7, Jaguars 7** Drive: 8 plays, 80 yds, 3:37

**Second quarter**

- CLE (12:03) – Josh Gordon 21 yd pass from Brandon Weeden (Billy Cundiff kick)
  **Browns 14, Jaguars 7** Drive: 11 plays, 92 yds, 5:17
- JAC (1:19) – Marcedes Lewis 8 yd pass from Maurice Jones-Drew (Josh Scobee kick)
  **Browns 14, Jaguars 14** Drive: 3 plays, 17 yds, 1:16
- JAC (0:48) – Josh Scobee 44 yd field goal
  **Jaguars 17, Browns 14** Drive: 4 plays, 2 yds, 0:26
- JAC (0:00) – Josh Scobee 36 yd field goal
  **Jaguars 20, Browns 14** Drive: 1 play, 0 yds, 0:05

**Third quarter**

- CLE (9:44) – Greg Little 4 yd pass from Brandon Weeden (Billy Cundiff kick)
  **Browns 21, Jaguars 20** Drive: 10 plays, 80 yds, 5:16

**Fourth quarter**

- JAC (7:42) – Brandon Weeden illegal kick in the end zone
  **Jaguars 22, Browns 21**
- JAC (4:14) – Josh Scobee 25 yd field goal
  **Jaguars 25, Browns 21** Drive: 7 plays, 36 yds, 3:28
- CLE (3:55) – Josh Gordon 95 yd pass from Brandon Weeden (Billy Cundiff kick)
  **Browns 28, Jaguars 25** Drive: 1 play, 95 yds, 0:19
- JAC (0:40) – Cecil Shorts III 20 yd pass from Chad Henne (Josh Scobee kick)
  **Jaguars 32, Browns 28** Drive: 9 plays, 80 yds, 3:15

**Top passers**

- JAC – Chad Henne – 22/40, 195 yds, 2 TD, 1 INT
- CLE – Brandon Weeden – 24/40, 370 yds, 3 TD, 2 INT

**Top rushers**

- JAC – Maurice Jones-Drew – 23 carr, 77 yds
- CLE – Willis McGahee – 14 carr, 57 yds, 1 TD

**Top receivers**

- JAC – Ace Sanders – 8 rec, 67 yds
- CLE – Josh Gordon – 10 rec, 261 yds, 2 TD

**Top tacklers**

- JAC – Paul Posluszny – 11 tackles, 0.5 sack
- CLE – T. J. Ward – 7 tackles

NFL record

- Josh Gordon became the first player in NFL history with consecutive games of 200+ yds receiving. His 498 receiving yds in the past 2 games are also an NFL record.

==== Week 14: at New England Patriots ====
Week Fourteen: Cleveland Browns at New England Patriots – Game summary

| Quarter | 1 | 2 | 3 | 4 | Total |
|---|---|---|---|---|---|
| Browns | 3 | 3 | 13 | 7 | **26** |
| **Patriots** | 0 | 0 | 11 | 16 | **27** |

at Gillette Stadium, Foxborough, Massachusetts

- Date: December 8
- Game time: 1:00 pm. EST
- Game weather: 30 °F (−1 °C), cloudy and cold
- Game attendance: 68,756
- Referee: Jerome Boger
- TV announcers (CBS): Don Criqui and Steve Tasker
- Recap, Game book

Game information

**First quarter**

- CLE (9:23) – Billy Cundiff 43 yd field goal
  **Browns 3, Patriots 0** Drive: 10 plays, 47 yds, 5:42

**Second quarter**

- CLE (14:50) – Billy Cundiff 37 yd field goal
  **Browns 6, Patriots 0** Drive: 9 plays, 37 yds, 3:46

**Third quarter**

- CLE (10:15) – Gary Barnidge 40 yd pass from Jason Campbell (run failed)
  **Browns 12, Patriots 0** Drive: 5 plays, 73 yds, 1:54
- NE (1:37) – Stephen Gostkowski 33 yd field goal
  **Browns 12, Patriots 3** Drive: 11 plays, 68 yds, 3:46
- CLE (1:25) – Josh Gordon 80 yd pass from Jason Campbell (Billy Cundiff kick)
  **Browns 19, Patriots 3** Drive: 1 play, 80 yds, 0:12
- NE (0:06) – Shane Vereen 6 yd run (Tom Brady pass to Julian Edelman)
  **Browns 19, Patriots 11** Drive: 3 plays, 72 yds, 1:19

**Fourth quarter**

- NE (5:43) – Stephen Gostkowski 50 yd field goal
  **Browns 19, Patriots 14** Drive: 12 plays, 49 yds, 5:48
- CLE (2:39) – Jordan Cameron 4 yd pass from Jason Campbell (Billy Cundiff kick)
  **Browns 26, Patriots 14** Drive: 8 plays, 80 yds, 3:04
- NE (1:01) – Julian Edelman 2 yd pass from Tom Brady (Stephen Gostkowski kick)
  **Browns 26, Patriots 21** Drive: 11 plays, 82 yds, 1:38
- NE (0:31) – Danny Amendola 1 yd pass from (Tom Brady) (run failed)
  **Patriots 27, Browns 26** Drive: 2 plays, 40 yds, 0:30

**Top passers**

- CLE – Jason Campbell – 29/44, 391 yds, 3 TD
- NE – Tom Brady – 32/52, 418 yds, 2 TD, 1 INT

**Top rushers**

- CLE – Josh Gordon – 1 carr, 34 yds
- NE – LeGarrette Blount – 8 carr, 42 yds

**Top receivers**

- CLE – Josh Gordon – 7 rec, 151 yds, 1 TD
- NE – Shane Vereen – 12 rec, 153 yds

**Top tacklers**

- CLE – D'Qwell Jackson – 9 tackles, 1 INT
- NE – Dont'a Hightower – 11 tackles

Cleveland squandered a 26–14 lead that they had at the two-minute warning in the fourth quarter as Tom Brady and the Patriots scored two unanswered touchdowns followed by a missed game-winning field goal by Cundiff. The Browns dropped to 4–9, clinching their sixth consecutive losing season.

==== Week 15: vs. Chicago Bears ====
Week Fifteen: Chicago Bears at Cleveland Browns – Game summary

| Quarter | 1 | 2 | 3 | 4 | Total |
|---|---|---|---|---|---|
| **Bears** | 0 | 10 | 7 | 21 | **38** |
| Browns | 3 | 7 | 14 | 7 | **31** |

at FirstEnergy Stadium, Cleveland, Ohio

- Date: December 15
- Game time: 1:00 pm. EST
- Game weather: 25 °F (−4 °C), flurries
- Game attendance: 71,513
- Referee: Jeff Triplette
- TV announcers (Fox): Thom Brennaman, Brian Billick and Laura Okmin
- Recap, Game book

Game information

**First quarter**

- CLE (7:26) – Billy Cundiff 35 yd field goal
  **Browns 3, Bears 0** Drive: 7 plays, 56 yds, 3:11

**Second quarter**

- CHI (12:55) – Robbie Gould 23 yd field goal
  **Browns 3, Bears 3** Drive: 15 plays, 75 yds, 9:31
- CLE (8:01) – Tashaun Gipson 44 yd interception return (Billy Cundiff kick)
  **Browns 10, Bears 3**
- CHI (0:24) – Brandon Marshall 5 yd pass from Jay Cutler (Robbie Gould kick)
  **Browns 10, Bears 10** Drive: 4 plays, 66 yds, 1:05

**Third quarter**

- CHI (13:48) – Zack Bowman 43 yd interception return (Robbie Gould kick)
  **Bears 17, Browns 10**
- CLE (8:20) – Edwin Baker 2 yd run (Billy Cundiff kick)
  **Bears 17, Browns 17** Drive: 10 plays, 85 yds, 5:28
- CLE (3:40) – T. J. Ward 51 yd fumble return (Billy Cundiff kick)
  **Browns 24, Bears 17**

**Fourth quarter**

- CHI (10:59) – Alshon Jeffery 45 yd pass from Jay Cutler (Robbie Gould kick)
  **Browns 24, Bears 24** Drive: 6 plays, 95 yds, 2:33
- CHI (5:41) – Earl Bennett 4 yd pass from Jay Cutler (Robbie Gould kick)
  **Bears 31, Browns 24** Drive: 6 plays, 36 yds, 3:28
- CHI (2:17) – Michael Bush 40 yd run (Robbie Gould kick)
  **Bears 38, Browns 24** Drive: 5 plays, 78 yds, 1:55
- CLE (0:59) – Josh Gordon 43 yd pass from Jason Campbell (Billy Cundiff kick)
  **Bears 38, Browns 31** Drive: 5 plays, 80 yds, 1:18

**Top passers**

- CHI – Jay Cutler – 22/31, 265 yds, 3 TD, 2 INT
- CLE – Jason Campbell – 23/39, 273 yds, 1 TD, 2 INT

**Top rushers**

- CHI – Matt Forté – 24 carr, 127 yds
- CLE – Edwin Baker – 8 carr, 38 yds, 1 TD

**Top receivers**

- CHI – Brandon Marshall – 6 rec, 95 yds, 1 TD
- CLE – Greg Little – 4 rec, 68 yds

**Top tacklers**

- CHI – Zack Bowman – 1 tackle, 2 INT, 1 TD
- CLE – Tashaun Gipson – 8 tackles, 2 INT, 1 TD

With the loss, the Browns fell to 4–10 (a 3–5 home record) and were eliminated from postseason contention for the eleventh straight season, extending their franchise record for most consecutive seasons without a playoff berth.

==== Week 16: at New York Jets ====
Week Sixteen: Cleveland Browns at New York Jets – Game summary

| Quarter | 1 | 2 | 3 | 4 | Total |
|---|---|---|---|---|---|
| Browns | 3 | 7 | 0 | 3 | **13** |
| **Jets** | 0 | 10 | 0 | 14 | **24** |

at MetLife Stadium, East Rutherford, New Jersey

- Date: December 22
- Game time: 1:00 pm. EST
- Game weather: 70 °F (21 °C), cloudy
- Game attendance: 76,957
- Referee: Pete Morelli
- TV announcers (CBS): Marv Albert and Rich Gannon
- Recap, Game book

Game information

**First quarter**

- CLE (6:30) – Billy Cundiff 27 yd field goal
  **Browns 3, Jets 0** Drive: 13 plays, 34 yds, 5:31

**Second quarter**

- CLE (6:47) – Edwin Baker 5 yd run (Billy Cundiff kick)
  **Browns 10, Jets 0** Drive: 4 plays, 41 yds, 1:37
- NYJ (1:18) – David Nelson 6 yd pass from Geno Smith (Nick Folk kick)
  **Browns 10, Jets 7** Drive: 13 plays, 80 yds, 5:29
- NYJ (0:00) – Nick Folk 21 yd field goal
  **Browns 10, Jets 10** Drive: 5 plays, 79 yds, 0:32

**Third quarter** No scoring **Fourth quarter**

- NYJ (14:14) – David Nelson 5 yd pass from Geno Smith (Nick Folk kick)
  **Jets 17, Browns 10** Drive: 14 plays, 81 yds, 6:28
- CLE (9:40) – Billy Cundiff 21 yd field goal
  **Jets 17, Browns 13** Drive: 9 plays, 50 yds, 4:34
- NYJ (3:19) – Geno Smith 19 yd run (Nick Folk kick)
  **Jets 24, Browns 13** Drive: 14 plays, 80 yds, 6:21

**Top passers**

- CLE – Jason Campbell – 18/40, 178 yds, 2 INT
- NYJ – Geno Smith – 20/36, 214 yds, 2 TD

**Top rushers**

- CLE – Edwin Baker – 17 carr, 64 yds, 1 TD
- NYJ – Chris Ivory – 20 carr, 109 yds

**Top receivers**

- CLE – Josh Gordon – 6 rec, 97 yds
- NYJ – Jeremy Kerley – 5 rec, 70 yds

**Top tacklers**

- CLE – D'Qwell Jackson – 11 tackles
- NYJ – Dee Milliner – 9 tackles, 1 INT

==== Week 17: at Pittsburgh Steelers ====
Week Seventeen: Cleveland Browns at Pittsburgh Steelers – Game summary

| Quarter | 1 | 2 | 3 | 4 | Total |
|---|---|---|---|---|---|
| Browns | 0 | 0 | 0 | 7 | **7** |
| **Steelers** | 7 | 7 | 3 | 3 | **20** |

at Heinz Field, Pittsburgh, Pennsylvania

- Date: December 29
- Game time: 1:00 pm. EST
- Game weather: 40 °F (4 °C), light rain
- Game attendance: 56,361
- Referee: Mike Carey
- TV announcers (CBS): Spero Dedes and Steve Beuerlein
- Recap, Game book

Game information

**First quarter**

- PIT (9:53) – Jerricho Cotchery 9 yd pass from Ben Roethlisberger (Shaun Suisham kick)
  **Steelers 7, Browns 0** Drive: 9 plays, 62 yds, 3:36

**Second quarter**

- PIT (4:22) – Le'Veon Bell 5 yd run (Shaun Suisham kick)
  **Steelers 14, Browns 0** Drive: 14 plays, 67 yds, 8:17

**Third quarter**

- PIT (3:50) – Shaun Suisham 30 yd field goal
  **Steelers 17, Browns 0** Drive: 11 plays, 54 yds, 5:13

**Fourth quarter**

- PIT (8:26) – Shaun Suisham 32 yd field goal
  **Steelers 20, Browns 0** Drive: 4 plays, 8 yds, 2:06
- CLE (2:46) – Fozzy Whittaker 35 yd pass from Jason Campbell (Billy Cundiff kick)
  **Steelers 20, Browns 7** Drive: 9 plays, 70 yds, 2:57

**Top passers**

- CLE – Jason Campbell – 23/41, 240 yds, 1 TD, 1 INT
- PIT – Ben Roethlisberger – 19/31, 179 yds, 1 TD, 2 INT

**Top rushers**

- CLE – Edwin Baker – 18 carr, 69 yds
- PIT – Le'Veon Bell – 20 carr, 90 yds, 1 TD

**Top receivers**

- CLE – Josh Gordon – 7 rec, 82 yds
- PIT – Antonio Brown – 9 rec, 87 yds

**Top tacklers**

- CLE – Tashaun Gipson – 8 tackles, 1 INT
- PIT – Lawrence Timmons – 8 tackles, 1 sack, 1 INT

=== Standings ===
==== Division ====
AFC North
| | W | L | T | PCT | DIV | CONF | PF | PA | STK |
|---|---|---|---|---|---|---|---|---|---|
| ^{(3)} Cincinnati Bengals | 11 | 5 | 0 | .688 | 3–3 | 8–4 | 430 | 305 | W2 |
| Pittsburgh Steelers | 8 | 8 | 0 | .500 | 4–2 | 6–6 | 379 | 370 | W3 |
| Baltimore Ravens | 8 | 8 | 0 | .500 | 3–3 | 6–6 | 320 | 352 | L2 |
| Cleveland Browns | 4 | 12 | 0 | .250 | 2–4 | 3–9 | 308 | 406 | L7 |

==== Conference ====
AFC
| # | Team | Division | W | L | T | PCT | DIV | CONF | SOS | SOV | STK |
|---|---|---|---|---|---|---|---|---|---|---|---|
**Division winners**
| 1 | Denver Broncos | West | 13 | 3 | 0 | .813 | 5–1 | 9–3 | .469 | .423 | W2 |
| 2 | New England Patriots | East | 12 | 4 | 0 | .750 | 4–2 | 9–3 | .473 | .427 | W2 |
| 3 (Note: Cincinnati defeated Indianapolis head-to-head (Week 14, 42–28).) | Cincinnati Bengals | North | 11 | 5 | 0 | .688 | 3–3 | 8–4 | .480 | .494 | W2 |
| 4 | Indianapolis Colts | South | 11 | 5 | 0 | .688 | 6–0 | 9–3 | .484 | .449 | W3 |
**Wild cards**
| 5 | Kansas City Chiefs | West | 11 | 5 | 0 | .688 | 2–4 | 7–5 | .445 | .335 | L2 |
| 6 | San Diego Chargers | West | 9 | 7 | 0 | .563 | 4–2 | 6–6 | .496 | .549 | W4 |
**Did not qualify for the postseason**
| 7 (Note: Pittsburgh finished with a better division record than Baltimore.) (Note: Pittsburgh defeated the New York Jets head-to-head (Week 6, 19–6).) | Pittsburgh Steelers | North | 8 | 8 | 0 | .500 | 4–2 | 6–6 | .469 | .441 | W3 |
| 8 (Note: Baltimore defeated the New York Jets head-to-head (Week 12, 19–3).) | Baltimore Ravens | North | 8 | 8 | 0 | .500 | 3–3 | 6–6 | .484 | .418 | L2 |
| 9 (Note: The New York Jets finished with a better division record than Miami.) | New York Jets | East | 8 | 8 | 0 | .500 | 3–3 | 5–7 | .488 | .414 | W2 |
| 10 | Miami Dolphins | East | 8 | 8 | 0 | .500 | 2–4 | 7–5 | .523 | .523 | L2 |
| 11 | Tennessee Titans | South | 7 | 9 | 0 | .438 | 2–4 | 6–6 | .504 | .375 | W2 |
| 12 | Buffalo Bills | East | 6 | 10 | 0 | .375 | 3–3 | 5–7 | .520 | .500 | L1 |
| 13 (Note: Oakland and Jacksonville finished with a better conference record than Cleveland.) (Note: Oakland defeated Jacksonville head-to-head (Week 2, 19–9).) | Oakland Raiders | West | 4 | 12 | 0 | .250 | 1–5 | 4–8 | .523 | .359 | L6 |
| 14 (Note: Jacksonville defeated Cleveland head-to-head (Week 13, 32–28).) | Jacksonville Jaguars | South | 4 | 12 | 0 | .250 | 3–3 | 4–8 | .504 | .234 | L3 |
| 15 | Cleveland Browns | North | 4 | 12 | 0 | .250 | 2–4 | 3–9 | .516 | .477 | L7 |
| 16 | Houston Texans | South | 2 | 14 | 0 | .125 | 1–5 | 2–10 | .559 | .500 | L14 |
**Tiebreakers** (Note: When breaking ties for three or more teams under the NFL's rules, they are first broken within divisions, then comparing only the highest ranked remaining team from each division.)

== Personnel ==
=== Staff / Coaches ===
2013 Cleveland Browns staff
| Front office: Owner – Jimmy Haslam; CEO – Joe Banner; President – Alec Scheiner; Executive vice-president of business operations – Bryan Wiedmeier; General manager – Michael Lombardi; Assistant general manager – Ray Farmer; Special Advisor – Jim Brown; Director of player personnel – Jon Sandusky; Head coaches: Head coach – Rob Chudzinski; Special Assistant to the head coach – Steve Gera; Offensive coaches: Offensive coordinator – Norv Turner; Running backs – John Settle; Wide receivers – Scott Turner; Tight ends – Jon Embree; Offensive line – George Warhop; Offensive line – Mike Sullivan; Offensive assistant – Shane Steichen; Coaching intern – Aubrey Pleasant | Defensive coaches: Defensive coordinator – Ray Horton; Defensive line – Joe Cullen; Outside linebackers – Brian Baker; Inside linebackers – Ken Flajole; Defensive backs – Louie Cioffi; Assistant Secondary – Bobby Babich; Defensive quality control – Daron Roberts; Special teams coaches: Special Teams coordinator – Chris Tabor; Special teams assistant – Shawn Mennenga; Strength and conditioning: Strength and conditioning – Brad Roll; Assistant strength and conditioning – Chris DiSanto; Assistant strength and conditioning – Derik Keyes |

=== Final roster ===
2013 Cleveland Browns roster
| Quarterbacks (QB): 17 Jason Campbell; 7 Alex Tanney; 3 Brandon Weeden; Running backs (RB): 27 Edwin Baker; 26 Willis McGahee; 25 Chris Ogbonnaya; 35 Fozzy Whittaker; Wide receivers (WR): 88 Josh Cooper; 12 Josh Gordon; 18 Greg Little; 85 Brian Tyms; Tight ends (TE): 82 Gary Barnidge; 84 Jordan Cameron; 47 MarQueis Gray; 83 Keavon Milton; 87 Andre Smith | Offensive linemen (OL): 75 Oniel Cousins T; 78 Reid Fragel T; 65 Garrett Gilkey G; 77 John Greco G; 66 Shawn Lauvao G; 55 Alex Mack C; 62 Jason Pinkston G; 72 Mitchell Schwartz T; 73 Joe Thomas T; 64 Martin Wallace T; Defensive linemen (DL): 93 John Hughes DE; 67 Ishmaa'ily Kitchen NT; 71 Ahtyba Rubin DE; 70 Brian Sanford DE; 98 Phil Taylor NT; 90 Billy Winn DE | Linebackers (LB): 95 Armonty Bryant OLB; 59 Tank Carder ILB; 50 Darius Eubanks ILB; 96 Paul Hazel OLB; 52 D'Qwell Jackson ILB; 99 Paul Kruger OLB; 56 Eric Martin OLB; 51 Barkevious Mingo OLB; 53 Craig Robertson ILB; 97 Jabaal Sheard OLB; Defensive backs (DB): 24 Johnson Bademosi FS; 39 Tashaun Gipson FS; 23 Joe Haden CB; 29 Leon McFadden CB; 38 Julian Posey CB; 33 Jordan Poyer SS; 22 Buster Skrine CB; 43 T. J. Ward SS; Special teams (ST): 8 Billy Cundiff K; 5 Spencer Lanning P; 57 Christian Yount LS | Practice squad: 34 Jamaine Cook RB; 81 Tori Gurley WR; 31 T. J. Heath CB; 79 Cam Henderson DE; 30 Jamoris Slaughter S; 94 Justin Staples LB; 9 Conner Vernon WR; 61 Jeremiah Warren G; Reserve: 37 Josh Aubrey SS (IR); 80 Travis Benjamin WR (IR); 15 Davone Bess WR (NF-Ill.); 8 Brandon Bogotay K (IR); 92 Desmond Bryant DE (NF-Ill.); 70 Chris Faulk T (NF-Inj.); 54 Quentin Groves OLB (IR); 6 Brian Hoyer QB (IR); 11 Charles Johnson WR (NF-Inj.); 28 Dion Lewis RB (IR); 58 Brandon Magee ILB (IR); Rookies in italics 53 active, 11 reserve, 8 practice squad |
