= T. J. Ward =

American football player (born 1986)

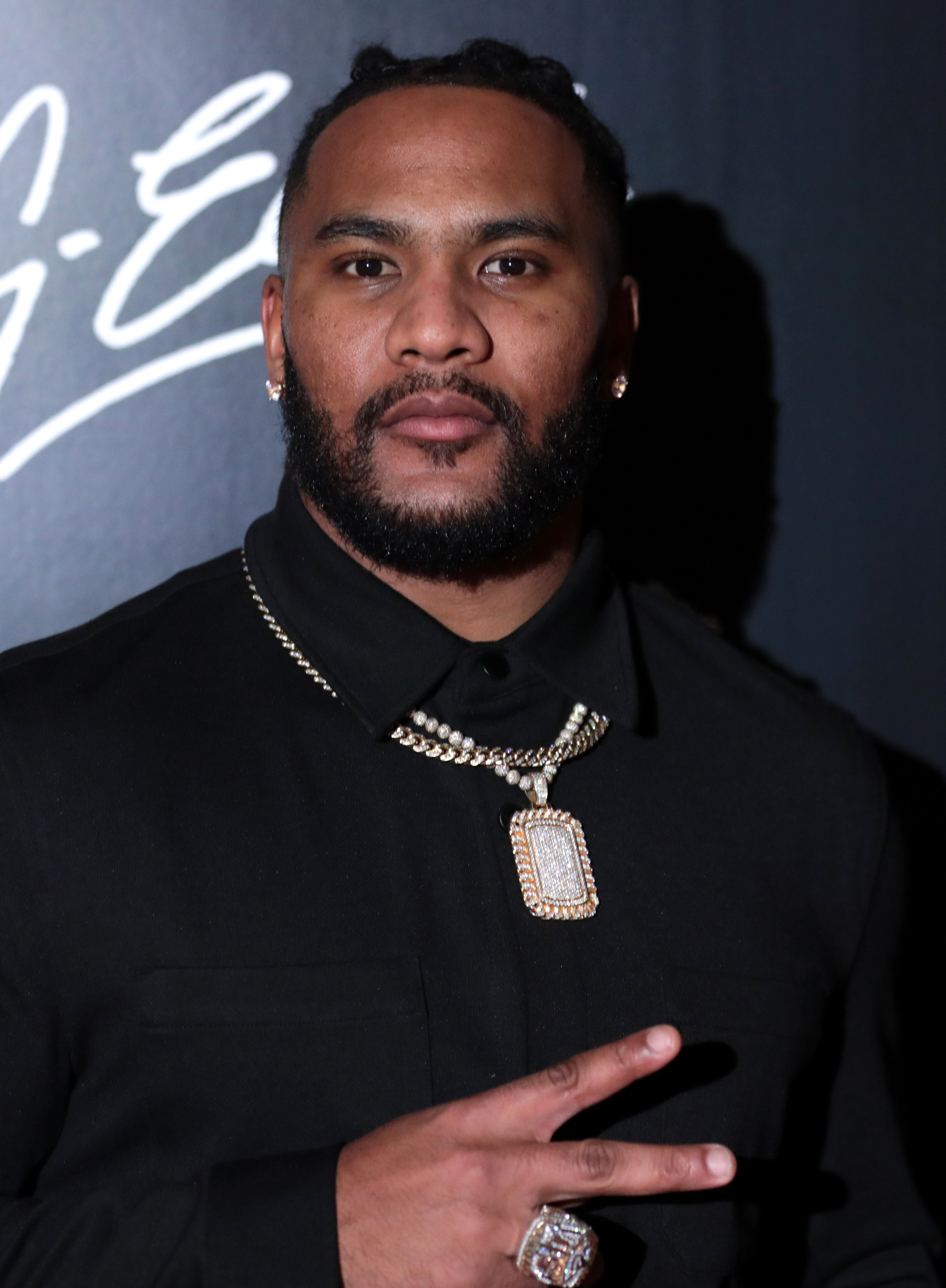
- Ward in 2023

No. 43
- Position: Safety

Personal information
- Born: December 12, 1986 (age 39); San Francisco, California, U.S.
- Listed height: 5 ft 10 in (1.78 m)
- Listed weight: 200 lb (91 kg)

Career information
- High school: De La Salle (Concord, California)
- College: Oregon (2005–2009)
- NFL draft: 2010: 2nd round, 38th overall pick

Career history
- Cleveland Browns (2010–2013); Denver Broncos (2014–2016); Tampa Bay Buccaneers (2017); Arizona Cardinals (2020)*
- * Offseason or practice squad member only

Awards and highlights
- Super Bowl champion (50); Second-team All-Pro (2013); 3× Pro Bowl (2013, 2014, 2015); PFWA NFL All-Rookie Team (2010)

Career NFL statistics
- Total tackles: 607
- Sacks: 8.5
- Forced fumbles: 10
- Fumble recoveries: 4
- Interceptions: 8
- Defensive touchdowns: 3
- Stats at Pro Football Reference

Terrell Ray Williams "T. J." Ward Jr. (born December 12, 1986) is an American former professional football safety who played for eight seasons in the National Football League (NFL). He played college football for the Oregon Ducks, and was selected by the Cleveland Browns in the second round of the 2010 NFL draft. Ward also played for the Denver Broncos, with whom he won Super Bowl 50.

== Early life ==
Ward played high school football at prep powerhouse De La Salle during their 151-game winning streak. An injury early in his senior year deterred many scouts, leading him to walk-on with the Oregon Ducks. He did not move up in the starting lineup until his senior year due to the talent on the team.

Ward was one of the top defenders on the Ducks during his time in Eugene (2005-2009), totaling 190 tackles, 9.0 tackles for loss and two interceptions from his safety position. He led the team in tackles during the 2008 season with 101 and was honored as a PAC-10 Honorable Mention selection.

== Professional career ==
Pre-draft measurables
Height	Weight	Arm length	Hand span	40-yard dash	10-yard split	20-yard split	20-yard shuttle	Three-cone drill	Vertical jump	Broad jump	Bench press
5 ft 10 1/2 in (1.79 m)	211 lb (96 kg)	30 3/4 in (0.78 m)	9 1/4 in (0.23 m)	4.48 s	1.53 s	2.54 s	4.12 s	7.00 s	34.0 in (0.86 m)	10 ft 1 in (3.07 m)	19 reps
All values from NFL Combine /Oregon's Pro Day

=== Cleveland Browns ===
==== 2010 ====
The Cleveland Browns selected Ward in the second round (38th overall) of the 2010 NFL draft. He signed his four-year rookie contract, worth US$4.02 million, on July 26, 2010.

Throughout training camp, Ward competed against Mike Adams to be the starting free safety. Head coach Eric Mangini named Ward the starting free safety to begin the regular season. He started alongside strong safety Abram Elam.

He made his professional regular season debut in the Cleveland Browns’ season-opener at the Tampa Bay Buccaneers and recorded 11 combined tackles (eight solo) during their 17-14 loss. On October 3, 2010, Ward recorded nine combined tackles during the Browns 23-20 victory against the Cincinnati Bengals in Week 4. During the fourth quarter, Ward was penalized for delivering a hit to the head of Bengals’ wide receiver Jordan Shipley. Shipley was carted off the field and was diagnosed with a concussion. On October 6, 2010, the league issued Ward a $15,000 fine for the hit that drew national attention and was widely criticized. On November 21, 2010, Ward made five solo tackles, two pass deflections, and intercepted two passes during a 24-20 loss at the Jacksonville Jaguars in Week 11. Ward made his first career interception off a pass attempt by quarterback David Garrard, that was initially intended for wide receiver Mike Thomas, and returned it for a 16-yard gain during the third quarter. In Week 14, he collected a season-high 12 combined tackles (ten solo) during a 13-6 loss at the Buffalo Bills. He started all 16 games as a rookie in 2010 and recorded 123 combined tackles (95 solo), ten pass deflections, two interceptions, and one forced fumble.

==== 2011 ====
On January 4, 2011, the Cleveland Browns announced their decision to fire head coach Eric Mangini after they finished with a 5-11 record in 2010. The Cleveland Browns hired Pat Shurmur as their new head coach and also hired Dick Jauron to replace Rob Ryan as defensive coordinator. Head coach Pat Shurmur named Ward the starting strong safety to begin the regular season, alongside free safety Usama Young. In Week 6, Ward collected a season-high eight combined tackles in the Browns’ 24-17 loss at the Oakland Raiders. On October 23, 2011, Ward made seven combined tackles, deflected a pass, and made his first career sack during a 6-3 win against the Seattle Seahawks in Week 7. Ward made his first career sack on Seahawks’ quarterback Charlie Whitehurst for an eight-yard loss in the second quarter. On November 6, 2011, Ward sprained his foot during a 30-12 loss at the Houston Texans in Week 9 and was inactive for the next six games (Weeks 10-15). On December 22, 2011, the Cleveland Browns officially placed Ward on injured reserve. He finished the season with 39 combined tackles (28 solo), three pass deflections, and one sack in eight games and eight starts.

==== 2012 ====
Ward retained his role as the starting strong safety in 2012 and began the season alongside starting free safety Eric Hagg. In Week 2, he collected a season-high nine combined tackles during a 34-27 loss at the Cincinnati Bengals. On December 18, 2012, the Cleveland Browns placed Ward on injured reserve due to a knee injury. Ward finished the 2012 NFL season with 68 combined tackles (50 solo), four pass deflections, three forced fumbles, one sack, and one interception in 15 games and 15 starts. On December 31, 2012, the Cleveland Browns announced their decision to fire head coach Pat Shurmur and general manager Tom Heckert after finishing with a 5-11 record.

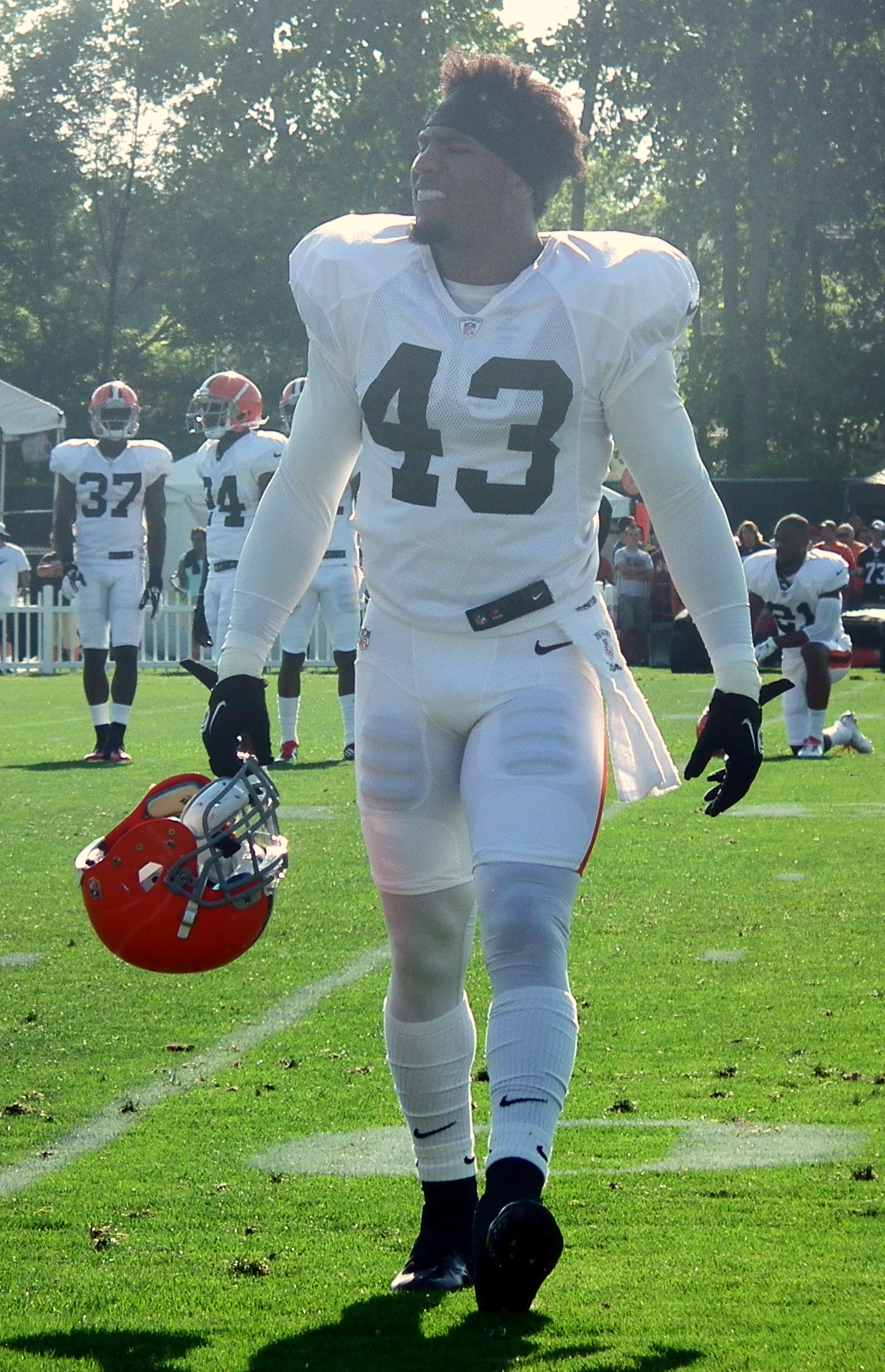
Ward with the Browns training camp in 2012

==== 2013 ====
On January 11, 2013, the Cleveland Browns hired Carolina Panthers’ offensive coordinator Rob Chudzinski to be their new head coach. Defensive coordinator Ray Horton retained Ward as the starting strong safety. Ward started alongside starting free safety Tashaun Gipson. On October 3, 2013, Ward made five combined tackles, deflected a pass, and returned an interception for the first touchdown of his career during a 37-24 victory against the Buffalo Bills in Week 5. Ward intercepted a pass thrown by Bills’ quarterback Jeff Tuel, that was intended for wide receiver Robert Woods, and returned it for a 44-yard touchdown in the fourth quarter. In Week 7, he collected a season-high 11 combined tackles (nine solo) during a 31-13 loss at the Green Bay Packers. On December 15, 2013, Ward made nine combined tackles, deflected a pass, and returned a fumble recovery for a touchdown during a 38-31 loss against the Chicago Bears in Week 15. Ward recovered a fumble by Bears’ tight end Martellus Bennett, that was forced by teammate Billy Winn, and returned it for a 51-yard touchdown during the third quarter. He started in all 16 games in 2013 and made 112 combined tackles (75 solo), five pass deflections, two interceptions, and 1.5 sacks.

=== Denver Broncos ===
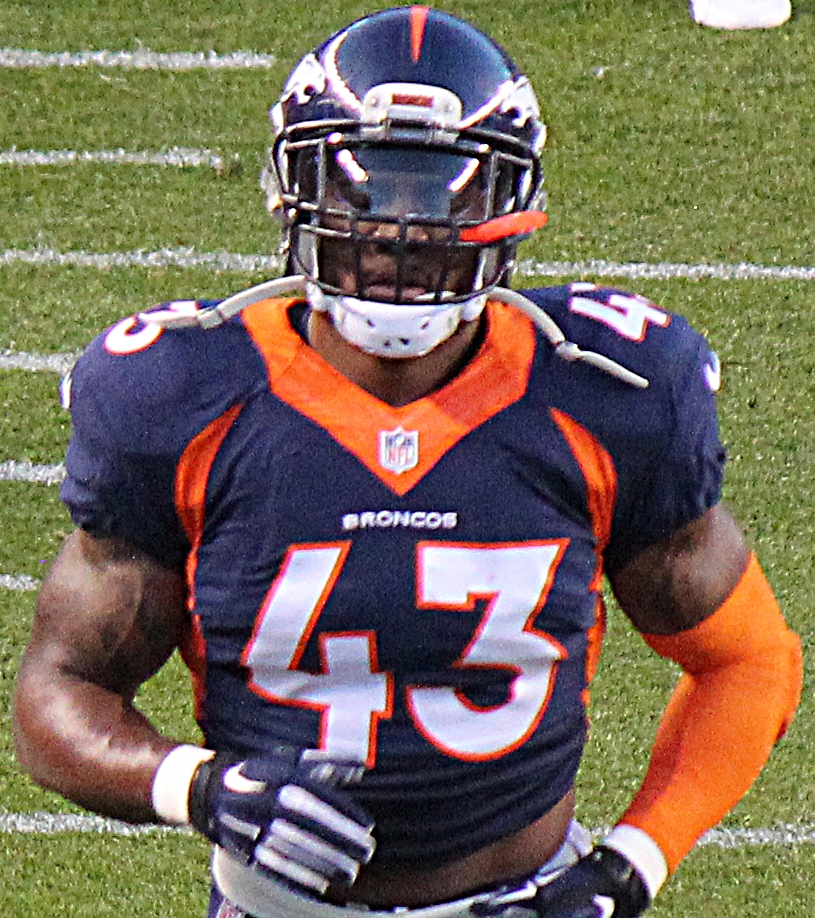
Ward with the Denver Broncos in 2014

On March 11, 2014, Ward signed with the Denver Broncos on a four-year, $23 million contract. On December 24, he earned a second consecutive trip to the Pro Bowl.

Ward had 61 tackles, two sacks, two forced fumbles, and six passes defended in the 2015 NFL season. The Broncos finished with the #1 defense and a 12-4 record. In the Divisional Round against the Pittsburgh Steelers, Ward recorded four tackles in a 23–16 victory. In the AFC Championship game against the New England Patriots, Ward had six tackles before having to leave the game with an ankle injury and did not return. The Broncos later went on to win the game 20–18. Ward returned to play in the Broncos 24–10 victory in Super Bowl 50 over the Carolina Panthers, where he recorded seven tackles, a pass defended, a fumble recovery, and an interception (which he fumbled, but recovered by his teammate Danny Trevathan). Ward received Pro Bowl acknowledgement in the 2015 season but was unable to participate due to playing in the Super Bowl. He was ranked 68th by his fellow players on the NFL Top 100 Players of 2016.

On September 2, 2017, Ward was released by the Broncos.

=== Tampa Bay Buccaneers ===
On September 3, 2017, Ward signed a one-year deal worth $5 million with the Tampa Bay Buccaneers.

=== Arizona Cardinals ===
On October 1, 2020, Ward was signed to the Arizona Cardinals' practice squad after being out of football the previous two seasons. He was released on October 20.

Ward announced his retirement on April 21, 2021.

== NFL career statistics ==
Legend
	Won the Super Bowl
	Led the league
**Bold**	Career high

=== Regular season ===
Year	Team	Games		Tackles					Interceptions					Fumbles			
Year	Team	GP	GS	Cmb	Solo	Ast	Sck	TFL	Int	Yds	TD	Lng	PD	FF	FR	Yds	TD
2010	CLE	**16**	**16**	**123**	**95**	28	0.0	4	**2**	39	0	23	**10**	1	0	0	0
2011	CLE	8	8	39	28	11	1.0	2	0	0	0	0	3	1	0	0	0
2012	CLE	14	14	68	50	18	1.0	2	1	37	0	37	4	**3**	0	0	0
2013	CLE	**16**	**16**	112	75	**37**	1.5	**9**	**2**	**57**	**1**	**44**	5	0	1	**51**	**1**
2014	DEN	15	15	74	60	14	**2.0**	6	**2**	55	0	37	5	0	0	0	0
2015	DEN	12	12	61	50	11	**2.0**	4	0	0	0	0	6	2	0	0	0
2016	DEN	14	14	87	69	18	1.0	1	1	23	0	23	8	**3**	**2**	0	0
2017	TAM	12	4	43	31	12	0.0	1	0	0	0	0	3	0	1	2	0
Career		107	99	607	458	149	8.5	29	8	211	1	44	44	10	4	53	1

=== Playoffs ===
Year	Team	Games		Tackles					Interceptions					Fumbles			
Year	Team	GP	GS	Cmb	Solo	Ast	Sck	TFL	Int	Yds	TD	Lng	PD	FF	FR	Yds	TD
2014	DEN	1	1	2	2	0	0.0	0	0	0	0	0	**2**	0	0	0	0
2015	DEN	**3**	**3**	**17**	**9**	**8**	0.0	**1**	**1**	-3	0	0	1	0	**1**	**5**	0
Career		4	4	19	11	8	0.0	1	1	-3	0	0	3	0	1	5	0

== Personal life ==
Ward is the older brother of former Atlanta Falcons running back Terron Ward.

== See also ==
- No Fly Zone
