= Jordan Cameron =

American football player (born 1988)

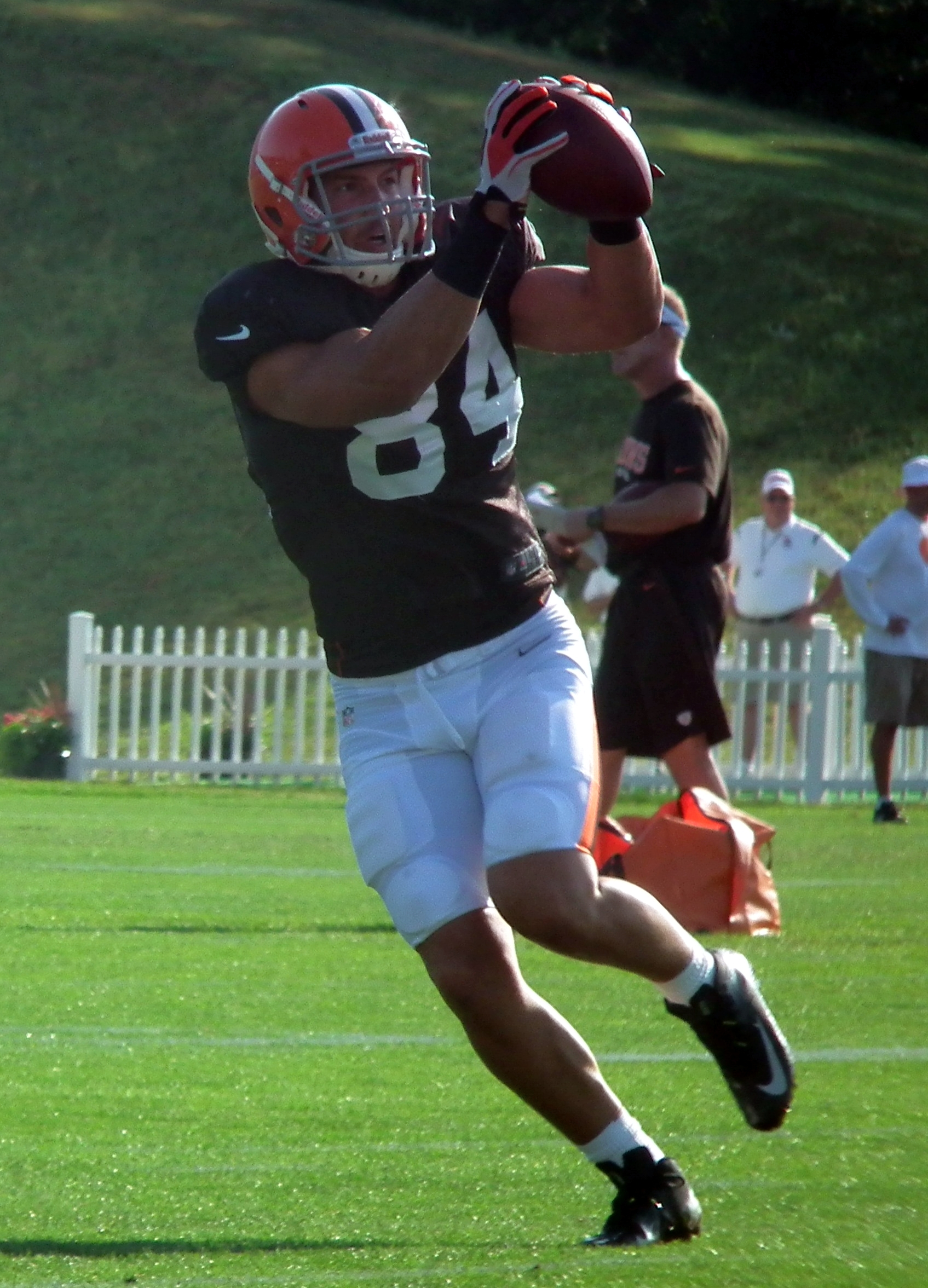
- Cameron with the Cleveland Browns in 2012

No. 84
- Position: Tight end

Personal information
- Born: August 7, 1988 (age 38); Newbury Park, California, U.S.
- Listed height: 6 ft 5 in (1.96 m)
- Listed weight: 265 lb (120 kg)

Career information
- High school: Newbury Park
- College: Ventura (2007); USC (2008–2010)
- NFL draft: 2011: 4th round, 102nd overall pick

Career history
- Cleveland Browns (2011–2014); Miami Dolphins (2015–2016)

Awards and highlights
- Pro Bowl (2013)

Career NFL statistics
- Receptions: 173
- Receiving yards: 2,046
- Receiving touchdowns: 14
- Stats at Pro Football Reference

Jordan Cravens Cameron (born August 7, 1988) is an American former professional football player who was a tight end in the National Football League (NFL). He played college football for the USC Trojans and was selected by the Cleveland Browns in the fourth round of the 2011 NFL draft. Cameron also played for the Miami Dolphins.

== Early life ==
Cameron was born on August 7, 1988, in Newbury Park, California, the son of Stan and Cathy Cameron (née Cravens), who works for a telecommunications company. He was raised Mormon (LDS). Cameron attended Newbury Park High School in Newbury Park. He made the All-Marmonte League first-team in 2005 as a junior. As a senior in 2006, he made Prep Star All-West and once again made All-Marmonte League first-team. He caught 73 passes for 1,022 yards and 12 touchdowns in his senior year. He was a teammate of former San Jose State quarterback Jordan LaSecla. He also starred in basketball and volleyball at Newbury Park High.

== College career ==
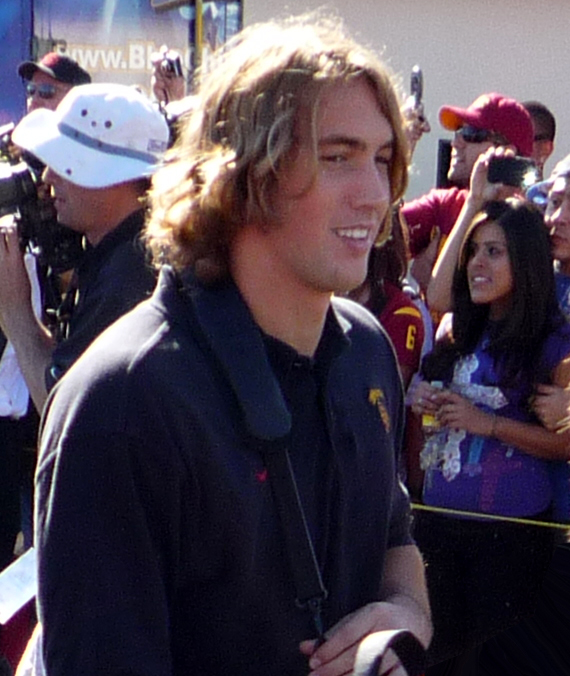
Cameron at USC

After high school, Cameron decided to play basketball at Brigham Young University rather than football. After redshirting his freshman year (2006–07), he decided to give football another try. He transferred to USC in 2007 to play football as a wide receiver. However, when USC refused to accept some of Cameron's credits from Brigham Young, he was forced to withdraw and attend Ventura College. He missed the football season but was given the option to try to rejoin the team in 2008. Even if he had stayed at USC, due to NCAA transfer rules he would have been ineligible to play in 2007. Cameron ended up enrolling at USC a year later and saw brief action for the Trojans at wide receiver in the 2008 and 2009 seasons, but did not make any catches. Prior to his senior year, he embraced a move from receiver to tight end. In his final season at USC, Cameron caught 16 passes for 126 yards and a touchdown.

== Professional career ==
=== Pre-draft ===
After his senior season at USC, Cameron was invited to play in the East–West Shrine Game where he made a big impression on the coaches during the week of practice. Cameron helped his draft stock significantly during his workouts at the NFL Combine. He was in the top three of every drill he participated in and fifth in bench press reps. He was projected to be a mid-to-late-round pick in the 2011 NFL draft.

Pre-draft measurables
| Height | Weight | Arm length | Hand span | Wingspan | 40-yard dash | 10-yard split | 20-yard split | 20-yard shuttle | Three-cone drill | Vertical jump | Broad jump | Bench press |
|---|---|---|---|---|---|---|---|---|---|---|---|---|
| 6 ft 5 1/4 in (1.96 m) | 254 lb (115 kg) | 33 1/2 in (0.85 m) | 9 3/4 in (0.25 m) | 6 ft 5 7/8 in (1.98 m) | 4.59 s | 1.58 s | 2.66 s | 4.03 s | 6.82 s | 37.5 in (0.95 m) | 9 ft 11 in (3.02 m) | 23 reps |
All values from NFL Combine

=== Cleveland Browns ===
Cameron was selected by the Cleveland Browns in the fourth round with the 102nd overall pick in the 2011 NFL draft. As a rookie, he played in eight games and started two. He finished with six receptions for 33 yards. He scored his first NFL touchdown in Week 12 of the 2012 season against the Pittsburgh Steelers on a five-yard reception. In the 2012 season, he appeared in 14 games and started six. He had 20 receptions for 226 yards and one touchdown.

Cameron had a breakout season in 2013. In the season opener against the Miami Dolphins, he had nine receptions for 108 yards and a touchdown in the 23–10 loss. In Week 3 against the Minnesota Vikings, he had three touchdown receptions in the 31–27 win. In Week 14 against the New England Patriots, he had nine receptions for 121 yards and one touchdown in the 27–26 loss. On December 27, 2013, Cameron was voted to the Pro Bowl. He had 80 receptions for 917 yards and seven touchdowns.

In the 2014 season, Cameron had 24 receptions for 424 yards and two touchdowns in ten games.

=== Miami Dolphins ===
Cameron signed a two-year, $15 million (with $5 million guaranteed) deal with the Miami Dolphins on March 12, 2015. In the 2015 season, he had 35 receptions for 386 yards and three touchdowns. He was placed on injured reserve on November 5, 2016, after suffering a season-ending concussion injury. He appeared in three games and had one touchdown in the 2016 season.

On March 10, 2017, after suffering four concussions in six seasons, Cameron announced his retirement from the NFL.

== NFL career statistics ==
| Year | Team | GP | Receiving | | | | | Fumbles | |
| Year | Team | GP | Rec | Yds | Avg | Lng | TD | Fum | Lost |
|---|---|---|---|---|---|---|---|---|---|
| 2011 | CLE | 8 | 6 | 33 | 5.5 | 15 | 0 | 0 | 0 |
| 2012 | CLE | 14 | 20 | 226 | 11.3 | 28 | 1 | 0 | 0 |
| 2013 | CLE | 15 | 80 | 917 | 11.5 | 53 | 7 | 1 | 0 |
| 2014 | CLE | 10 | 24 | 424 | 17.7 | 81 | 2 | 0 | 0 |
| 2015 | MIA | 16 | 35 | 386 | 11.0 | 29 | 3 | 1 | 0 |
| 2016 | MIA | 3 | 8 | 60 | 7.5 | 13 | 1 | 0 | 0 |
| Career | | 66 | 173 | 2,046 | 11.8 | 81 | 14 | 2 | 0 |

== Personal life ==
Cameron has four children, a son from a previous relationship, and three children with Elin Nordegren, the ex-wife of Tiger Woods (with whom Nordegren has two older children).

Cameron's older sister Brynn played guard on the USC women's basketball team. She has a child with fellow USC athlete Matt Leinart and two children with NBA star Blake Griffin. His younger brother Colby was an undrafted free agent quarterback for the Carolina Panthers, but was released before the 2013 NFL season. He is also the cousin of former Denver Broncos safety Su'a Cravens.

Cameron has Samoan ancestry and was nominated for the Polynesian Pro Football Player of the Year Award in 2016.
