= Greg Little (wide receiver) =

American football player (born 1989)

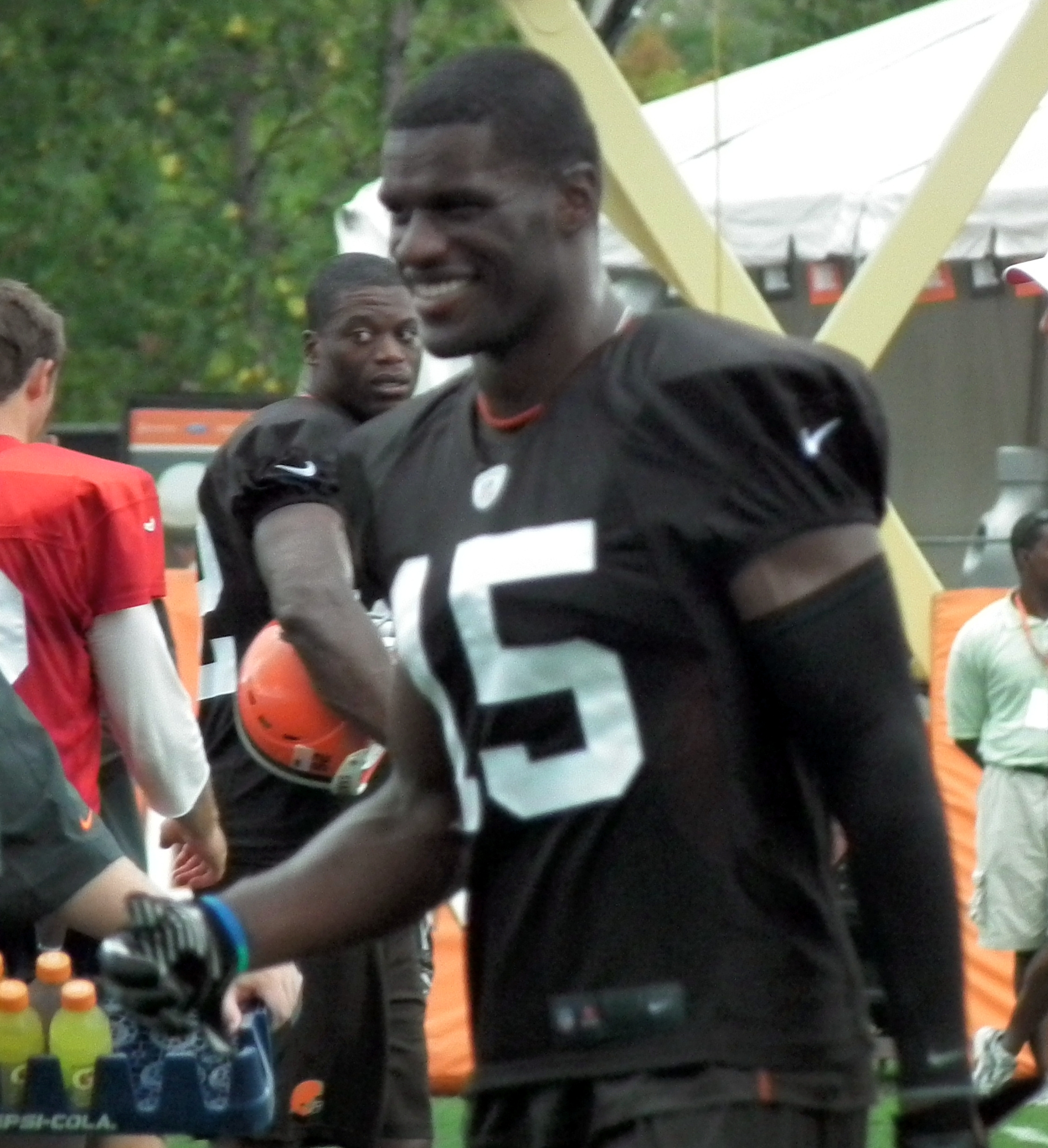
- Little with the Cleveland Browns in 2012

No. 15, 18, 88
- Position: Wide receiver

Personal information
- Born: May 30, 1989 (age 37); Durham, North Carolina, U.S.
- Listed height: 6 ft 2 in (1.88 m)
- Listed weight: 220 lb (100 kg)

Career information
- High school: Hillside (Durham, North Carolina)
- College: North Carolina (2007–2010)
- NFL draft: 2011: 2nd round, 59th overall pick

Career history
- Cleveland Browns (2011–2013); Oakland Raiders (2014)*; Cincinnati Bengals (2014–2015); Buffalo Bills (2016)*; Arizona Cardinals (2018)*
- * Offseason or practice squad member only

Career NFL statistics
- Receptions: 161
- Receiving yards: 1,890
- Receiving touchdowns: 8
- Stats at Pro Football Reference

Gregory Lamar Little (born May 30, 1989) is an American former professional football player who was a wide receiver in the National Football League (NFL). He was selected by the Cleveland Browns in the second round of the 2011 NFL draft. He played college football and college basketball at North Carolina.

== Early life ==
Little attended Hillside High School in Durham, North Carolina, where he played football, basketball and ran track. He graduated in the spring of 2007. Little primarily played tailback during his junior year as well as spending some time at wide receiver. His vertical jump was 40.0" and his broad jump was 10–1. North Carolina, Florida, Michigan, Notre Dame, Ohio State, and USC all offered scholarships for Little to attend their respective colleges. He visited North Carolina on October 13, 2006, Notre Dame on September 16, 2006, and Ohio State on September 23, 2006. He later verbally committed to the University of North Carolina. Little had a high school GPA of 3.7 and scored 930 on the SAT. He played in the 2007 U.S. Army All-American Bowl.

In track & field, Little competed in sprints and jumps. He was timed at 11.1 seconds in the 100 meters, cleared 1.92 meters in the high jump and got a top-jump of 6.38 meters in the long jump.

== College career ==
As a freshman in college during 2007, he had a total of 300 rushing yards and 99 receiving yards. Little also returned kickoffs for total of 145 yards. As a sophomore, he had a total of 339 rushing yards, 146 receiving yards, and 141 return yards. During his final collegiate season, as a junior, Little had 166 rushing yards, 724 receiving yards, and 222 kickoff return yards. As a senior in 2010, Little did not play, as he was ruled ineligible by the NCAA for lying to investigators about receiving travel accommodations and jewelry.

On November 19, 2013, the University of North Carolina sent a disassociation letter to Little, Marvin Austin, and Robert Quinn for the improper benefits taken during their time at the university. The three athletes are prohibited from contacting current North Carolina athletes and are not allowed inside the Kenan Football Center or other athletic facilities on campus.

As a freshman in college, Greg Little also played basketball on the University of North Carolina basketball team that went to the Final 4 during the 2007–08 season. He played in 10 games and averaged 1.5ppg.

== Professional career ==
Pre-draft measurables
| Height | Weight | Arm length | Hand span | Wingspan | 40-yard dash | 10-yard split | 20-yard split | 20-yard shuttle | Three-cone drill | Vertical jump | Broad jump | Bench press |
|---|---|---|---|---|---|---|---|---|---|---|---|---|
| 6 ft 2 1/2 in (1.89 m) | 231 lb (105 kg) | 33 1/4 in (0.84 m) | 9 1/8 in (0.23 m) | 6 ft 7 1/8 in (2.01 m) | 4.50 s | 1.63 s | 2.63 s | 4.16 s | 6.65 s | 40.5 in (1.03 m) | 10 ft 10 in (3.30 m) | 27 reps |
All values from NFL Combine/Pro Day

=== Cleveland Browns ===
Little was selected by the Cleveland Browns in the second round (59th overall) of the 2011 NFL draft.

Little finished the 2011 season leading the Browns with 61 catches and 709 receiving yards. He was second among rookies in catches, behind Cincinnati Bengals' first-round pick A. J. Green and fifth in yards behind A. J. Green, Torrey Smith, Julio Jones, and Doug Baldwin. He also finished with two touchdowns.

In 2012, Little started all 16 games, recording 53 catches for 647 yards and a career-high four touchdowns. The following season in 2013, he recorded 41 catches for 465 yards and two touchdowns in 16 games and 13 starts.

On May 16, 2014, Little was released by the Browns after three seasons with the team.

=== Oakland Raiders ===
On May 19, 2014, Little was claimed off waivers from the Browns by the Oakland Raiders. Little was released on August 30, 2014.

=== Cincinnati Bengals ===
On October 14, 2014, Little signed with the Cincinnati Bengals. He was released by the Bengals on February 28, 2015.

On July 30, 2015, Little re-signed with the Bengals. He was later released again by the Bengals on October 31, 2015.

=== Buffalo Bills ===
On January 12, 2016, Little signed a future contract with the Buffalo Bills. On August 30, 2016, Little was released by the Bills.

=== Arizona Cardinals ===
On June 14, 2018, Little signed with the Arizona Cardinals after two years away from football. He was released by the Cardinals on September 1.

== NFL career statistics ==
| Year | Team | GP | Receiving | | | | | | Rushing | | | | | Fumbles | |
| Year | Team | GP | Rec | Tgts | Yds | Avg | Lng | TD | Att | Yds | Avg | Lng | TD | Fum | Lost |
|---|---|---|---|---|---|---|---|---|---|---|---|---|---|---|---|
| 2011 | CLE | 16 | 61 | 121 | 709 | 11.6 | 76 | 2 | 3 | 15 | 5.0 | 13 | 0 | 0 | 0 |
| 2012 | CLE | 16 | 53 | 91 | 647 | 12.2 | 43 | 4 | 2 | 15 | 7.5 | 17 | 0 | 0 | 0 |
| 2013 | CLE | 16 | 41 | 99 | 465 | 11.3 | 47 | 2 | 0 | 0 | 0.0 | 0 | 0 | 0 | 0 |
| 2014 | CIN | 6 | 6 | 12 | 69 | 11.5 | 21 | 0 | 0 | 0 | 0.0 | 0 | 0 | 0 | 0 |
| 2015 | CIN | 0 | DNP | | | | | | | | | | | | |
| Total | | 54 | 161 | 323 | 1,890 | 11.7 | 76 | 8 | 5 | 30 | 6.0 | 17 | 0 | 0 | 0 |
