= Chris Ogbonnaya =

American football player (born 1986)

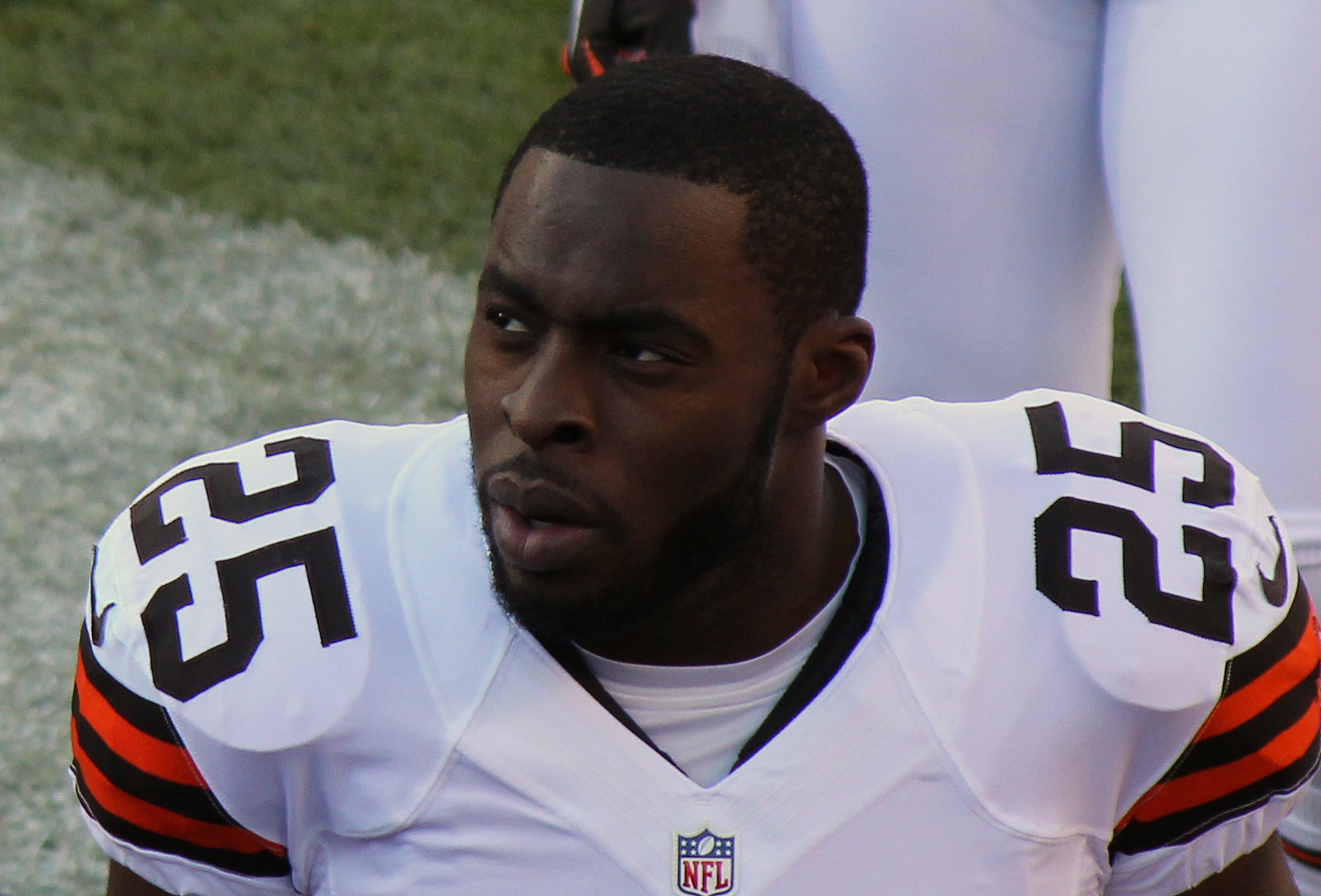
- Ogbonnaya with the Cleveland Browns in 2012

No. 22, 27, 25, 26, 47
- Position: Running back

Personal information
- Born: May 20, 1986 (age 40); Missouri City, Texas, U.S.
- Listed height: 6 ft 0 in (1.83 m)
- Listed weight: 225 lb (102 kg)

Career information
- High school: Strake Jesuit College Preparatory (Houston, Texas)
- College: Texas
- NFL draft: 2009: 7th round, 211th overall pick

Career history
- St. Louis Rams (2009); Houston Texans (2010–2011); Cleveland Browns (2011–2013); Carolina Panthers (2014); New York Giants (2014)

Awards and highlights
- BCS national champion (2005)

Career NFL statistics
- Rushing attempts: 158
- Rushing yards: 710
- Rushing touchdowns: 2
- Receptions: 96
- Receiving yards: 714
- Receiving touchdowns: 2
- Stats at Pro Football Reference

Christopher Irem Ogbonnaya //// (/ˌoʊɡbəˈnaɪ.ə/ OHG-bə-NY-ə; born May 20, 1986) is an American former professional football player who was a running back in the National Football League (NFL). He played college football for the Texas Longhorns and was selected by the St. Louis Rams in the seventh round of the 2009 NFL draft. Ogbonnaya also played for the Houston Texans, Cleveland Browns, Carolina Panthers, and New York Giants.

== Early life ==
Ogbonnaya played football at Strake Jesuit College Preparatory in Houston, Texas, where he was a three-year letterman who helped his team post a 27–5 record during his varsity career. As the team's leading rusher, he helped his squad to a 9–2 mark as a senior making 20 catches for 500 yards and four touchdowns with 270 yards rushing and two touchdowns that year. He caught 22 passes for 530 yards and eight touchdowns with 500 yards rushing and eight more touchdowns as a junior and also returned a kickoff for a touchdown that year while leading his team to an 8–3 record as a junior. He was the Greater Houston Offensive Player of the Year honors that season, and on defense, he had 57 tackles, three TFL and eight PBUs as a cornerback in 2002. He had 30 receptions for 600 yards and 10 touchdowns and added five interceptions from his cornerback spot for a 10–0 squad his sophomore year. He lettered in basketball for two years also lettered in track & field for three years.

== College career ==
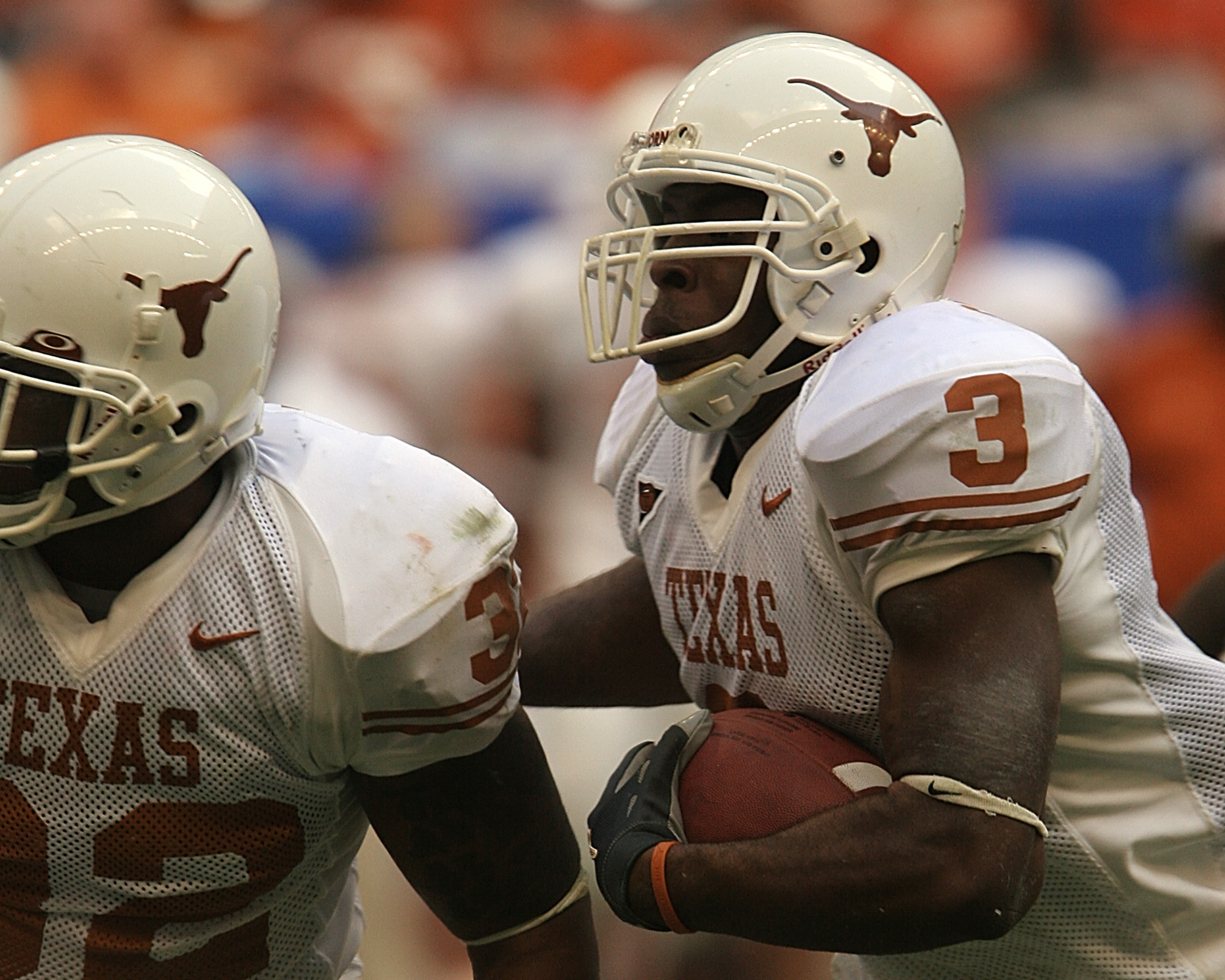
Ogbonnaya (#3) playing for Texas in 2005

Ogbonnaya attended the University of Texas at Austin, where he was a four-year letterman who appeared in 47 games at running back and on special teams. Career totals were 170 carries for 452 yards (2.6 ypc) and eight touchdowns and made 75 receptions for 792 yards and three touchdowns. He appeared in all 13 games, starting seven, in 2008 and earned honorable mention All-Big 12. He carried the ball 74 times for 373 yards (5.0 ypc) and four touchdowns and recorded 46 receptions for 540 yards and three touchdowns, including a 65-yard touchdown reception at Colorado. He appeared in all 13 games at tailback and on special teams in 2007 and had 26 carries for 66 yards and two touchdowns and 21 receptions for 204 yards. He also returned four kickoffs for 74 yards and had one special teams tackle. He played in all 13 games at fullback and on special teams in 2006 and rushed 18 times for 82 yards and a touchdown and caught seven passes for 45 yards. He saw action in eight games during Texas' 2005 National Championship season and rushed 22 times for 76 yards and a touchdown. He moved to tailback after spending his redshirt season as a wide receiver.

Academically, Ogbonnaya was a member of the National Honor Society and a prep honor student who maintained better than a 3.5 GPA while at Texas. He was named Crusader of the Year as a sophomore, a distinction that recognizes academics and athletics. Ogbonnaya was also a four-time First-team Academic All-Big 12 honoree.

== Professional career ==
Pre-draft measurables
Height	Weight	Arm length	Hand span	40-yard dash	10-yard split	20-yard split	20-yard shuttle	Three-cone drill	Vertical jump	Broad jump	Bench press
5 ft 11 3/4 in (1.82 m)	220 lb (100 kg)	31 5/8 in (0.80 m)	9 7/8 in (0.25 m)	4.65 s	1.64 s	2.71 s	4.29 s	6.85 s	35 in (0.89 m)	9 ft 3 in (2.82 m)	19 reps
All values from NFL Combine

=== St. Louis Rams ===
Ogbonnaya was selected in the seventh round (211th overall pick) in the 2009 NFL draft. On July 19, 2009, the Rams agreed to terms with Ogbonnaya on a four-year contract, including a $66,000 signing bonus. Ogbonnaya was promoted to the active roster on November 28, 2009.

=== Houston Texans ===
Ogbonnaya was signed to the Houston Texans' practice squad on September 5, 2010. He was re-signed that off-season, but was waived at the end of training camp. He was re-signed to the practice squad for 2011, but was promoted to the active roster on September 27, 2011. He was later released and re-signed to the practice squad.

=== Cleveland Browns ===
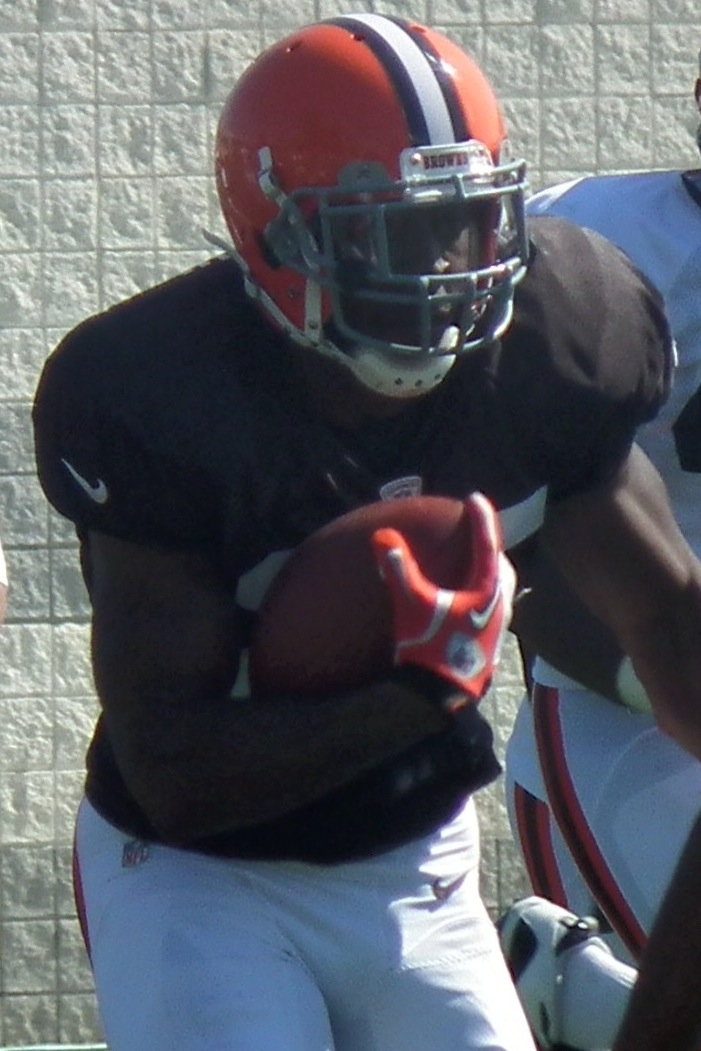
Ogbonnaya in 2012.

The Cleveland Browns signed him off of the Texans' practice squad on October 18, 2011. In his Cleveland Browns debut the following Sunday, he had three rushing attempts for 15 yards, and five receptions for 43 yards. In games against the St. Louis Rams and the Jacksonville Jaguars, he totaled 205 yards and 1 rushing touchdown.

During the October 7, 2012, game versus the New York Giants, Ogbonnaya received a pass from quarterback Brandon Weeden and took it down field for 38 yards - resulting in the longest reception of his career (second longest play from scrimmage).

On March 14, 2013, the Browns re-signed Ogbonnaya to a two-year contract.

=== Carolina Panthers ===
On September 29, 2014, the Carolina Panthers signed Ogbonnaya. On November 3, he was released.

=== New York Giants ===
On December 2, 2014, the New York Giants signed Ogbonnaya. On May 11, 2015, he was released by the Giants.

On June 19, 2015, Ogbonnaya announced his retirement.

=== Professional statistics ===
Season	Team	Receiving							Rushing					Fumbles	
Season	Team	GP	Rec	Tgts	Yds	Avg	Lng	TD	Att	Yds	Avg	Lng	TD	Fum	Lost
2009	STL	2	1	2	19	19.0	19	0	11	50	4.5	18	0	0	0
2011	HOU	2	0	0	0	0	0	0	3	6	2.0	4	0	0	0
2011	CLE	11	23	31	165	7.2	19	0	73	334	4.6	40	1	2	1
2012	CLE	15	24	32	187	7.8	38	0	8	30	3.8	9	0	1	1
2013	CLE	16	48	75	343	7.1	17	2	49	240	4.9	43	0	2	2
2014	CAR/NYG	7	0	0	0	0.0	0	0	14	50	3.6	9	1	0	0
Total		53	96	140	714	7.4	38	2	158	710	4.5	43	2	5	4

== Personal ==
Ogbonnaya married Jeanine Juliano on August 6, 2021, in New York City. The couple now lives in New Jersey.
