= Rob Chudzinski =

American football player and coach (born 1968)

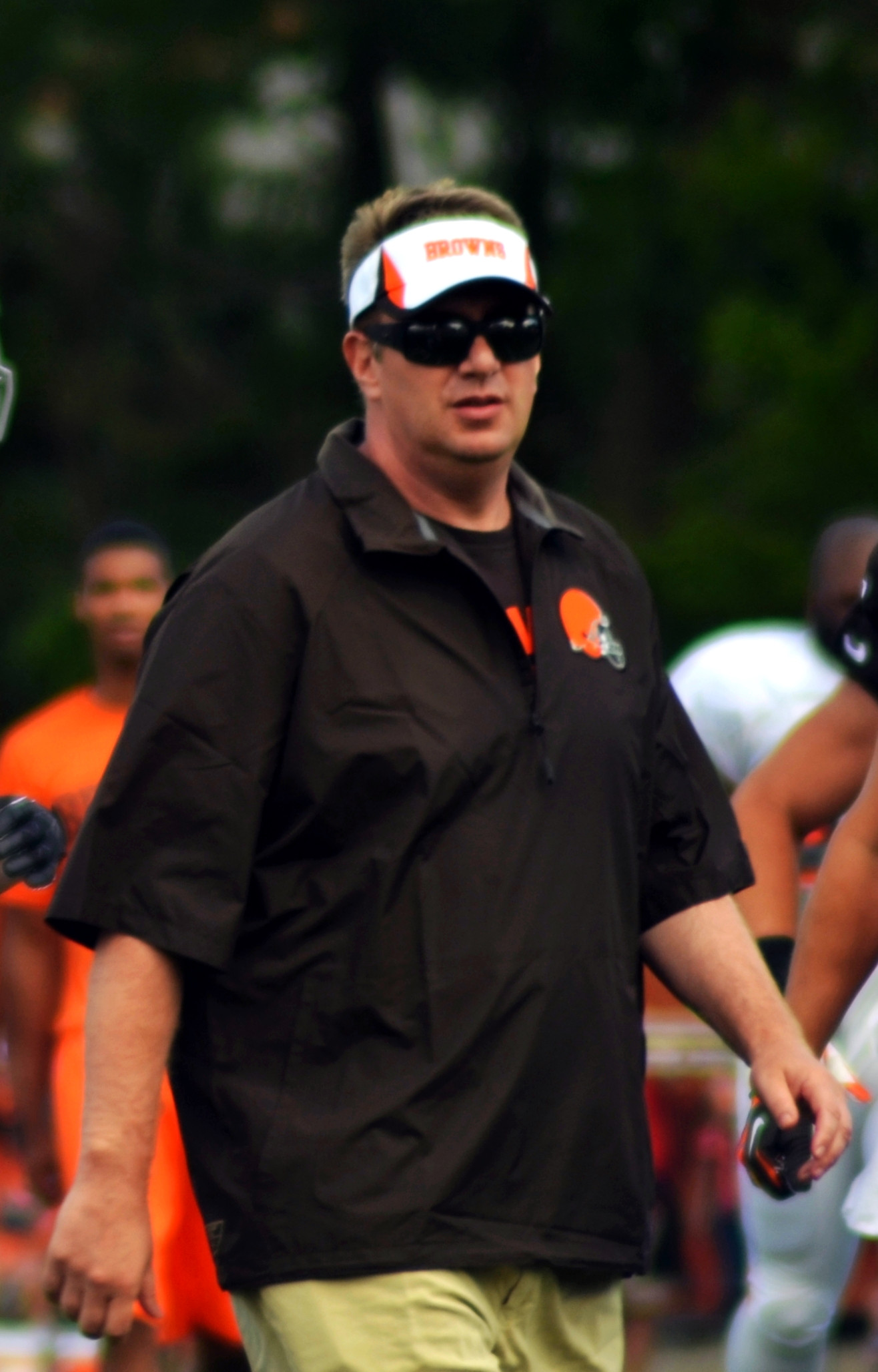
- Chudzinski as head coach of the Cleveland Browns in 2013

Boston College Eagles
- Title: Senior offensive analyst

Personal information
- Born: May 12, 1968 (age 58); Toledo, Ohio, U.S.

Career information
- High school: St. John's Jesuit (Toledo)
- College: Miami (FL) (1986–1990)

Career history
- Miami (1994–1995) Graduate assistant; Miami (1996–2000) Tight ends coach; Miami (2001–2003) Offensive coordinator; Cleveland Browns (2004) Tight ends coach; San Diego Chargers (2005–2006) Tight ends coach; Cleveland Browns (2007–2008) Offensive coordinator; San Diego Chargers (2009–2010) Tight ends coach & assistant head coach; Carolina Panthers (2011–2012) Offensive coordinator; Cleveland Browns (2013) Head coach; Indianapolis Colts (2014–2015) Associate head coach; Indianapolis Colts (2015–2017) Offensive coordinator; Boston College (2020–2022) Special assistant to the head coach; Boston College (2023) Associate head coach (offense); Boston College (2024–present) senior offensive analyst/offensive development

Awards and highlights
- 2× National champion (1987, 1989)

Head coaching record
- Regular season: NFL: 4–12 (.250)
- Coaching profile at Pro Football Reference

Robert Matthew Chudzinski (born May 12, 1968), nicknamed "Chud," is an American football coach who is currently the senior offensive analyst for the Boston College Eagles. Chudzinski was the offensive coordinator for several National Football League (NFL) teams and was the head coach of the Cleveland Browns during the 2013 NFL season.

== Playing career ==
He played college football at the University of Miami from 1986 to 1990 and won a national championship with the Miami Hurricanes in 1987 and again in 1989. He was a three-year starter at tight end for Miami. 1988 First Team All-South Independent

== Coaching career ==
=== College ===
==== University of Miami ====
From 1994 to 2003, Chudzinski coached at the University of Miami, his first two years as a graduate assistant. He was the tight ends coach from 1996 to 2000. From 2001 to 2003, he was the tight ends coach and offensive coordinator. In 2001, the Hurricanes won the national championship. In 2000, the Hurricanes offense set university records for points, total yards and rushing touchdowns. During his tenure at the University of Miami, he coached three All-American tight ends: Bubba Franks, Jeremy Shockey and Kellen Winslow II. He has coached Winslow (Cleveland Browns) and Shockey (Carolina Panthers) in the NFL.

- 2001: QB Ken Dorsey threw for 2,652 yards with 23 TD vs 9 INT. RB Clinton Portis ran for 1,200 yards with 10 TD. RB Frank Gore ran for 562 yards with 5 TD. WR Andre Johnson had 682 yards with 10 TD. TE Jeremy Shockey had 519 yards with 7 TD.
- 2002: QB Ken Dorsey threw for 3,369 yards with 28 TD vs 12 INT RB Willis McGahee ran for 1,753 yards with 28 TD. WR Andre Johnson had 1,092 yards with 9 TD. TE Kellen Winslow Jr. had 726 yards with 8 TD.
- 2003: RB Jarrett Payton ran for 985 yards with 7 TD. RB Tyrone Moss ran for 511 yards with 5 TD. RB Frank Gore ran for 468 yards with 4 TD. WR Ryan Moore had 637 yards with 3 TD. TE Kellen Winslow Jr. had 605 yards with 1 TD.

==== Boston College Eagles ====
In 2020, Chudzinski began work for the Boston College Eagles as a special assistant to the head coach for Jeff Hafley’s first three seasons. In 2023, he became an associate head coach for offense and offensive development. He is currently works as a Senior Offensive Analyst.

=== National Football League ===
==== Cleveland Browns (first stint) ====
Chudzinski was the tight ends coach and interim offensive coordinator of the Cleveland Browns in 2004.

==== San Diego Chargers (first stint) ====
In 2005, Chudzinski was hired as the tight ends coach of the San Diego Chargers. With the Chargers, he coached the All-Pro tight end Antonio Gates.

==== Cleveland Browns (second stint) ====
In 2007, Chudzinski was named the offensive coordinator of the Cleveland Browns. That year, the Cleveland Browns ranked eighth overall on offense, sent 4 offensive players to the 2008 Pro Bowl and finished second in the AFC North with a record of 10–6, their most wins since 1994. After the 2008 season Chudzinski was replaced by Brian Daboll as offensive coordinator, following the firing of the Cleveland Browns' head coach Romeo Crennel and the hiring of new head coach Eric Mangini.

==== San Diego Chargers (second stint) ====
In 2009, Chudzinski returned to the San Diego Chargers as the tight ends coach and assistant head coach.

==== Carolina Panthers ====
In 2011, Chudzinski was named the Carolina Panthers offensive coordinator. He took one of the league's worst offenses in 2010 and transformed it into one of the top 10 offenses in 2011 with the rookie quarterback Cam Newton. The Panthers finished seventh overall in the league on offense, fifth in points scored and set a new franchise record for total yards in a season.

==== Cleveland Browns (third stint) ====
On January 10, 2013, Chudzinski was hired as head coach of the Cleveland Browns. He was fired at the end of the season after a 4–12 record. He said in a statement that he was, "shocked and disappointed to hear the news" about his firing, but expressed his gratitude toward the Haslam family for giving him the opportunity and called himself, "a Cleveland Brown to the core".

==== Indianapolis Colts ====
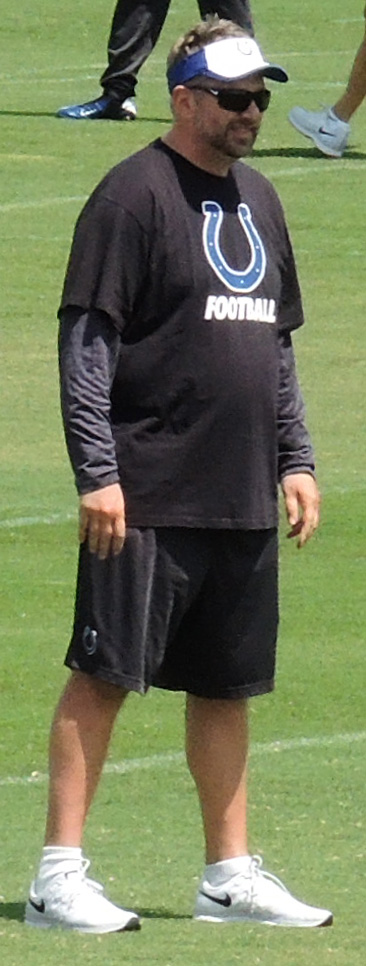
Chudzinski at the Colts training camp in 2015

On February 8, 2014, the Indianapolis Colts announced that they had hired Chudzinski as special assistant to the head coach Chuck Pagano. They had previously worked on the same staff at the University of Miami from 1995 to 2000 and with the Cleveland Browns in 2004.

On January 27, 2015, the Colts announced that Chudzinski would be associate head coach under Pagano.

On November 3, 2015, Chudzinski was named as the offensive coordinator, replacing Pep Hamilton.

== Personal life ==
Born on May 12, 1968, to Gary and Ruth Chudzinski, he attended Toledo St. John's High School. He lived in Bowling Green, Ohio, from 1971 to 1972. He and his wife, Sheila, have two sons, Kaelan and Rian, and one daughter, Margaret. Kaelan plays football for Boston College

== Head coaching record ==
| Team | Year | Regular season | | | | | Postseason | | | |
| Team | Year | Won | Lost | Ties | Win % | Finish | Won | Lost | Win % | Result |
|---|---|---|---|---|---|---|---|---|---|---|
| CLE | 2013 | 4 | 12 | 0 | .250 | 4th in AFC North | - | - | - | - |
| Total | | 4 | 12 | 0 | .250 | | 0 | 0 | .000 | |
