= Edwin Baker (American football) =

American football player (born 1991)

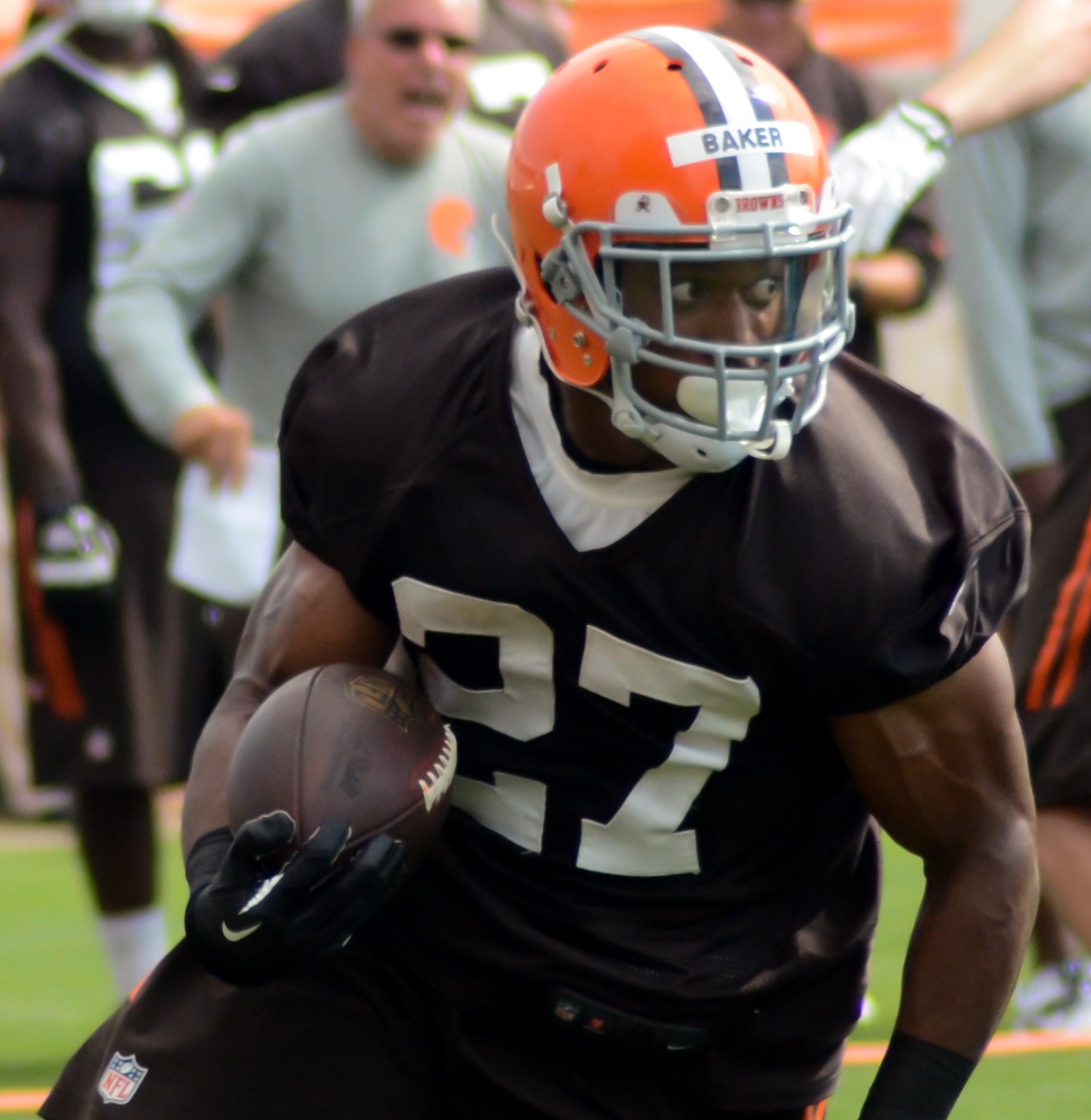
- Baker at Browns training camp in 2014

No. 27
- Position: Running back

Personal information
- Born: June 1, 1991 (age 35); Highland Park, Michigan, U.S.
- Listed height: 5 ft 8 in (1.73 m)
- Listed weight: 204 lb (93 kg)

Career information
- High school: Oak Park (Oak Park, Michigan)
- College: Michigan State
- NFL draft: 2012: 7th round, 250th overall pick

Career history
- San Diego Chargers (2012); Denver Broncos (2013)*; Houston Texans (2013)*; Cleveland Browns (2013); New Orleans Saints (2014); Toronto Argonauts (2016)*
- * Offseason or practice squad member only

Awards and highlights
- First-team All-Big Ten (2010)

Career NFL statistics
- Rushing attempts: 44
- Rushing yards: 173
- Rushing touchdowns: 2
- Receptions: 8
- Receiving yards: 57
- Stats at Pro Football Reference

Edwin Baker (born June 1, 1991) is an American former professional football player who was a running back in the National Football League (NFL). He was selected by the San Diego Chargers in the seventh round of the 2012 NFL draft. He played college football for the Michigan State Spartans.

== Professional career ==
=== San Diego Chargers ===
Baker was selected in the seventh round of the 2012 NFL draft by the San Diego Chargers. On August 25, 2013, he was cut by the Chargers.

=== Denver Broncos ===
Baker was signed to the practice squad of the Denver Broncos on September 2, 2013. He was released on November 19, 2013.

=== Houston Texans ===
Baker was signed to the practice squad of the Houston Texans on November 20, 2013. He was released on December 10, 2013.

=== Cleveland Browns ===
On December 10, 2013, the Cleveland Browns signed Baker to their active roster, off of the Houston Texans practice squad. In his debut, on December 15, 2013, Baker scored his first touchdown in the NFL on a short run in a 38–31 loss to the Chicago Bears. In just three games with Cleveland, Baker finished third in rushing yards and tied for the team lead in rushing touchdowns with two. On August 25, 2014, Baker was cut by the Browns.

=== New Orleans Saints ===
Baker was signed to the New Orleans Saints practice squad on September 16, 2014. He was moved to the active roster on October 25, 2014, after injuries to two other running backs, Pierre Thomas and Khiry Robinson. He was released by the Saints on September 5, 2015.

=== Toronto Argonauts ===
Baker signed with the Toronto Argonauts on January 19, 2016. On June 19, 2016, Baker was released by Toronto.
