= Josh Aubrey =

American football player (born 1991)

No. 31, 37
- Position: Safety

Personal information
- Born: April 9, 1991 (age 35); Terrell, Texas, U.S.
- Listed height: 5 ft 10 in (1.78 m)
- Listed weight: 207 lb (94 kg)

Career information
- High school: Tyler (TX) Lee
- College: Stephen F. Austin
- NFL draft: 2013: undrafted

Career history
- Cleveland Browns (2013); Seattle Seahawks (2014)*; Houston Texans (2014); Tennessee Titans (2015)
- * Offseason or practice squad member only

Career NFL statistics
- Total tackles: 1
- Rushing yards: 34
- Stats at Pro Football Reference

Josh Aubrey (born April 9, 1991) is an American former professional football player who was a safety in the National Football League (NFL). He was signed as an undrafted free agent by the Cleveland Browns. He also played for the Seattle Seahawks, Houston Texans, and Tennessee Titans. He played college football for the Stephen F. Austin Lumberjacks.

== Early life ==
He was selected to the all-district team twice in high school. He earned TSWA all-state honors and All-East Texas.

== Professional career ==
=== Cleveland Browns ===
On April 30, 2013, he signed with the Cleveland Browns as an undrafted free agent following the 2013 NFL draft.
