= 2012 Cleveland Browns season =

64th season in franchise history; first under Haslam ownership

- Owner: Randy Lerner (until October 25); Jimmy Haslam
- General manager: Tom Heckert
- Head coach: Pat Shurmur
- Home stadium: Cleveland Browns Stadium

Results
- Record: 5–11
- Division place: 4th AFC North
- Playoffs: Did not qualify
- Pro Bowlers: T Joe Thomas; K Phil Dawson

The 2012 season was the Cleveland Browns' 60th in the National Football League (NFL) and their 64th overall. Although they improved their record to 5–11 this season from their 4–12 finish in 2011, they still placed fourth in the AFC North. They also failed to break their nine-year playoff drought, the longest in franchise history. The 2012 season was the third season under the leadership of team president Mike Holmgren and general manager Tom Heckert, and the second season under head coach Pat Shurmur. The Browns also had Jimmy Haslam as their new owner, after buying the team from Randy Lerner.

== Off-season ==
=== Ownership change ===
On August 2, team owner Randy Lerner sold the controlling interest of the Browns to Tennessee businessman Jimmy Haslam. Haslam is the owner of Pilot Flying J travel centers and was previously a minority owner of the Pittsburgh Steelers. The amount of the sale was in excess of US$1 billion.

The sale was approved on October 25, 2012.

=== Coaching changes ===
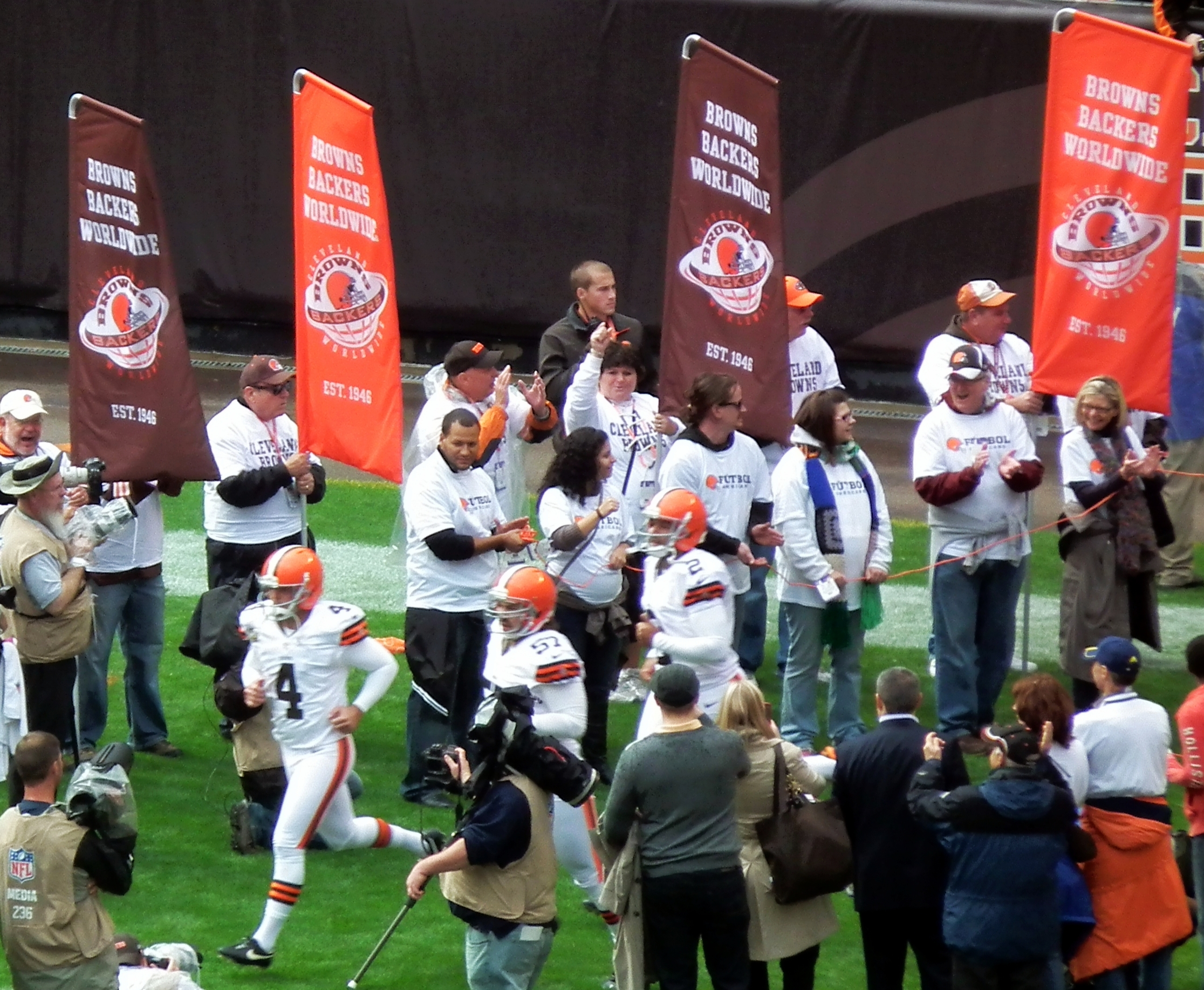
Phil Dawson and Reggie Hodges lead the Browns onto the field against Buffalo in week 3

On January 11, defensive backs coach Jerome Henderson left the Browns to take the same position with the Dallas Cowboys.

On January 18, the Browns hired Nolan Cromwell as a senior offensive assistant. Cromwell replaces Keith Gilbertson, who retired following the 2011 season.

On January 23, the Browns hired former Tennessee Titans' assistant secondary coach Tim Hauck to replace Henderson as defensive backs coach. Hauck was on the Titans' staff from 2009 to 2010, and served as an assistant at the collegiate level prior to that.

On January 27, the Browns hired former Minnesota Vikings' head coach Brad Childress as offensive coordinator. Childress coached the Vikings from 2006 to 2010. From 2003 to 2005, he was the offensive coordinator of the Philadelphia Eagles, where he worked with current Browns' head coach Pat Shurmur.

=== Roster changes ===
==== Free agency ====
Pos	Player	Tag	Date signed	2012 team
FS	Mike Adams	UFA	March 15	Denver Broncos
DE	Marcus Benard	RFA		
ILB	Titus Brown	ERFA/UFA		
G	Oniel Cousins	UFA	March 15	Cleveland Browns
K	Phil Dawson	UFA/FT	March 13	Cleveland Browns
G	John Greco	UFA	March 13	Cleveland Browns
T	Artis Hicks	UFA	March 15	Miami Dolphins
RB	Peyton Hillis	UFA	March 14	Kansas City Chiefs
ILB	D'Qwell Jackson	UFA	February 27	Cleveland Browns
P	Brad Maynard	UFA		
WR	Jordan Norwood	ERFA	April 16	Cleveland Browns
CB	Dimitri Patterson	UFA	March 15	Cleveland Browns
DT	Brian Schaefering	ERFA	March 15	Cleveland Browns
TE	Alex Smith	UFA	March 13	Cleveland Browns
C	Steve Vallos	UFA	March 19	Philadelphia Eagles
RFA: Restricted free agent, UFA: Unrestricted free agent, ERFA: Exclusive rights free agent, FT: Franchise tag

Player re-signed by Browns

==== Releases ====
Pos	Player	Date released	Date signed	2012 Team
P	Richmond McGee	March 12		
DE	Jayme Mitchell	March 16	June 4	Tampa Bay Buccaneers
T	Tony Pashos	March 12		
RB	Armond Smith	May 14	May 15	Carolina Panthers
G	Eric Steinbach	March 14	July 26	Miami Dolphins

==== Signings ====
Pos	Player	Date signed	2011 Team
DE	Juqua Parker	March 15	Philadelphia Eagles
DE	Frostee Rucker	March 14	Cincinnati Bengals

==== 2012 Draft Class ====
The draft occurred from April 26–28. The Browns had an NFL-high eleven selections.

Round	Selection	Player	Position	College
1	3^{[a]}	Trent Richardson	RB	Alabama
1	22^{[b]}	Brandon Weeden	QB	Oklahoma State
2	37	Mitchell Schwartz	T	California
3	87^{[c]}	John Hughes	DT	Cincinnati
4	100	Travis Benjamin	WR	Miami (FL)
4	120^{[c]}	James-Michael Johnson	LB	Nevada
5	160^{[d]}	Ryan Miller	G	Colorado
6^{[e]}	204^{[f]}	Emmanuel Acho	LB	Texas
6^{[e]}	205^{[f]}	Billy Winn	DT	Boise State
7	245^{[f]}	Trevin Wade	CB	Arizona
7	247^{[f]}	Brad Smelley	FB	Alabama

NOTES:

^{^[a]} On Draft Day, The Browns acquired the Minnesota Vikings' first-round pick (No. 3) for their own first- (No. 4), fourth- (No. 118), fifth- (No. 139) and seventh- (No. 211) round selections.
^{^[b]} The Browns acquired the Atlanta Falcons' 2012 first- (No. 22) and fourth- (No. 118, traded to Minnesota) round selections and 2011 first-, second-, and fourth-round selections for Cleveland's 2011 first-round selection.
^{^[c]} The Browns traded their third-round pick (No. 67) to the Denver Broncos for their third- (No. 87) and fourth- (No. 120) round picks.
^{^[d]} The Browns acquired the Denver Broncos' fifth-round selection, as well as a 2011 sixth-round selection and RB Peyton Hillis in exchange for QB Brady Quinn during the 2010 offseason.
^{^[e]} Although the Browns have two sixth-round selections, they traded their original selection in this round to the Minnesota Vikings for DE Jayme Mitchell.
^{^[f]} Compensatory selection

==== Undrafted free agents ====
Pos	Player	College	Signed	Released
CB	Mike Allen	James Madison	April 30	May 30
G	Matt Cleveland	Idaho	April 30	August 26
WR	Josh Cooper	Oklahoma State	April 30	August 31
CB	Emanuel Davis	East Carolina	April 30	August 26
LB	JoJo Dickson	Idaho	May 14	August 26
C	Garth Gerhart	Arizona State	April 30	August 31
S	Tashaun Gipson	Wyoming	April 30	
DE	William Green	Florida	April 30	August 31
WR	Antwuan Reed	Pittsburgh	April 30	August 26
WR	Bert Reed	Florida State	April 30	August 26
WR	Jermaine Saffold	Missouri State	April 30	August 26
G	J.B. Shugarts	Ohio State	April 30	August 31
LB	Andrew Sweat	Ohio State	April 30	May 14
RB	Adonis Thomas	Toledo	May 14	August 31

==== Supplemental Draft ====
On July 12, the Browns selected WR Josh Gordon of Baylor with a second round pick in the supplemental draft. The Browns will forfeit their second round pick in the 2013 NFL draft. Gordon became only the second player drafted by the Browns in the supplemental draft, the other being QB Bernie Kosar in 1985.

=== Other news and notes ===
==== LB Fujita suspension ====
On May 2, NFL commissioner Roger Goodell announced a three-game suspension for LB Scott Fujita for his role in the New Orleans Saints bounty scandal in 2009. Fujita was suspended along with former Saints teammates Jonathan Vilma, Anthony Hargrove, and Will Smith for what the commissioner called "conduct detrimental to the NFL as a result of their leadership roles."

Fujita and the three other players have appealed the suspensions, however on July 3 Goodell upheld the suspensions.

On September 7, two days before the Week 1 game, the suspensions against Fujita and the other players were overturned. Fujita started the Week 1 contest.

==== DT Taylor injury ====
On May 10, starting DT Phil Taylor tore his left pectoral muscle while doing bench presses in the weight room. Taylor, the Browns' 1st round draft choice in 2011, will be out for several months and may miss the entire season.

=== Suicide of grounds crew member ===
A member of the Browns' grounds crew killed himself at their practice facility in Berea, Ohio, a team spokesman said Sunday, December 2, 2012. The man's body was found Saturday morning, December 1, 2012, at the facility in suburban Cleveland, the same day Kansas City Chiefs linebacker Jovan Belcher committed suicide after killing his girlfriend. Browns spokesman Neal Gulkis confirmed to The Associated Press that a team employee died of a suicide, but provided no other details. He released a statement calling the man a good friend and an outstanding employee and saying the team's heartfelt condolences go out to his family.

== Staff ==
2012 Cleveland Browns staff
Front office: Majority owner – Jimmy Haslam; Minority owner – Randy Lerner; CEO – Joe Banner; President – Alec Scheiner; general manager – Tom Heckert; Executive vice president of business operations – Bryan Wiedmeier; Senior vice president of football operations – Mark Schiefelbein; Senior vice president of football administration – Matt Thomas; Director of player personnel – Jon Sandusky; Director of college scouting – John Spytek; Head coaches: Head coach – Pat Shurmur; Assistant to the head coach – Luke Steckel; Offensive coaches: Offensive coordinator – Brad Childress; Quarterbacks – Mark Whipple; Running backs – Gary Brown; Wide receivers – Mike Wilson; Tight ends – Steve Hagen; Offensive line – George Warhop; Senior offensive assistant – Nolan Cromwell; Offensive assistant – Chris Beake	Defensive coaches: Defensive coordinator – Dick Jauron; Defensive line – Dwaine Board; Linebackers – Billy Davis; Defensive backs – Tim Hauck; Senior defensive assistant – Ray Rhodes; Defensive assistant – Chuck Bullough; Special teams coaches: Special teams coordinator – Chris Tabor; Special teams assistant – Shawn Mennenga; Strength and conditioning: Strength and conditioning – Kent Johnston; Assistant strength and conditioning – Rick Lyle

== Rosters ==
=== Opening training camp roster ===
2012 Cleveland Browns Opening training camp roster
Quarterbacks (QB): 9 Thaddeus Lewis; 12 Colt McCoy; 6 Seneca Wallace; 3 Brandon Weeden; Running backs (RB): 20 Montario Hardesty; 29 Brandon Jackson; 48 Owen Marecic FB; 25 Chris Ogbonnaya; 33 Trent Richardson; 47 Brad Smelley FB; 35 Adonis Thomas; Wide receivers (WR): 80 Travis Benjamin; 88 Josh Cooper; 16 Josh Cribbs; 86 Josh Gordon; 15 Greg Little; 11 Mohamed Massaquoi; 18 Carlton Mitchell; 10 Jordan Norwood; 83 Bert Reed; 85 Jermaine Saffold; 17 Owen Spencer; 13 Rod Windsor; Tight ends (TE): 84 Jordan Cameron; 87 Dan Gronkowski; 81 Alex Smith; 82 Ben Watson	Offensive linemen (OL): 78 Dominic Alford G/T; 63 Jake Anderson T; 61 Matt Cleveland T; 75 Oniel Cousins G; 64 Stanley Daniels G; 53 Garth Gerhart G; 77 John Greco G; 66 Shawn Lauvao G; 55 Alex Mack C; 60 Ryan Miller G/T; 62 Jason Pinkston G/T; 72 Mitchell Schwartz T; 74 Jarrod Shaw G; 68 J. B. Shugarts T; 73 Joe Thomas T; Defensive linemen (DL): 58 Marcus Benard DE; 94 Auston English DE; 49 William Green DE; 93 John Hughes DT; -- Ishmaa'ily Kitchen DT; 95 Juqua Parker DE; 69 Scott Paxson DT; 92 Frostee Rucker DE; 70 Brian Sanford DE; 91 Brian Schaefering DT; 97 Jabaal Sheard DE; 96 Emmanuel Stephens DE; 67 Kiante Tripp DT; 79 Billy Winn DE	Linebackers (LB): 59 Emmanuel Acho MLB; 42 JoJo Dickson MLB; 40 L. J. Fort OLB; 99 Scott Fujita OLB; 51 Chris Gocong OLB; 52 D'Qwell Jackson MLB; 54 Ben Jacobs OLB; 50 James-Michael Johnson MLB; 56 Kaluka Maiava OLB; 47 Craig Robertson MLB; 90 Quinton Spears OLB/DE; Defensive backs (DB): 37 Johnson Bademosi FS; 24 Sheldon Brown CB; 38 Emanuel Davis CB; 31 James Dockery CB; 39 Tashaun Gipson FS; 23 Joe Haden CB; 27 Eric Hagg SS; 21 Dimitri Patterson CB; 34 Antwuan Reed CB; 36 David Sims SS; 22 Buster Skrine CB; 41 Ray Ventrone SS; 26 Trevin Wade CB; 43 T. J. Ward SS; 28 Usama Young FS; Special teams (ST): 4 Phil Dawson K; 2 Reggie Hodges P; 5 Spencer Lanning P; 7 Jeff Wolfert K; 57 Christian Yount LS	Reserve: 89 Evan Moore TE (Active/NF-Inj.); 71 Ahtyba Rubin DT (Active/PUP); 98 Phil Taylor DT (Active/PUP); 44 Eddie Williams FB (Active/PUP); Rookies in italics 90 active, 0 reserve

=== Week 1 Roster ===
Quarterbacks (QB): 9 Thaddeus Lewis; 12 Colt McCoy; 3 Brandon Weeden; Running backs (RB): 20 Montario Hardesty; 29 Brandon Jackson; 48 Owen Marecic FB; 25 Chris Ogbonnaya; 33 Trent Richardson; Wide receivers (WR): 80 Travis Benjamin; 16 Josh Cribbs; 13 Josh Gordon; 15 Greg Little; 11 Mohamed Massaquoi; 10 Jordan Norwood; Tight ends (TE): 84 Jordan Cameron; 81 Alex Smith; 82 Ben Watson	Offensive linemen (OL): 75 Oniel Cousins G; 77 John Greco G; 66 Shawn Lauvao G; 55 Alex Mack C; 60 Ryan Miller G/T; 62 Jason Pinkston G; 72 Mitchell Schwartz T; 73 Joe Thomas T; Defensive linemen (DL): 93 John Hughes DT; 67 Ishmaa’ily Kitchen DT; 95 Juqua Parker DE; 71 Ahtyba Rubin DT; 92 Frostee Rucker DE; 97 Jabaal Sheard DE; 96 Emmanuel Stephens DE; 90 Billy Winn DE	Linebackers (LB): 94 Tank Carder MLB; 58 L. J. Fort OLB; 52 D'Qwell Jackson MLB; 50 James-Michael Johnson MLB; 99 Scott Fujita OLB; 56 Kaluka Maiava OLB; 53 Craig Robertson MLB; Defensive backs (DB): 37 Johnson Bademosi FS; 24 Sheldon Brown CB; 39 Tashaun Gipson FS; 23 Joe Haden CB; 27 Eric Hagg FS; 21 Dimitri Patterson CB; 22 Buster Skrine CB; 41 Ray Ventrone FS; 26 Trevin Wade CB; 43 T. J. Ward SS; 28 Usama Young SS; Special teams (ST): 4 Phil Dawson K; 2 Reggie Hodges P; 57 Christian Yount LS	Practice squad: 65 Ronnie Cameron DT; 88 Josh Cooper WR; 61 Garth Gerhart G; 54 Ben Jacobs OLB; 70 Brian Sanford DE; 74 Jarrod Shaw G; 68 J. B. Shugarts T; 47 Brad Smelley; Reserve: 59 Emmanuel Acho MLB (IR); -- Marcus Benard DE (IR); -- Auston English DE; 51 Chris Gocong OLB (IR); 69 Scott Paxson DT (IR); 34 Antwuan Reed CB (IR); 98 Phil Taylor DT (PUP); 44 Eddie Williams FB (IR) 53 active, 8 practice squad, 9 reserve Rookies in italics

=== Final roster ===
2012 Cleveland Browns roster
Quarterbacks (QB): 8 Josh Johnson; 9 Thad Lewis; 12 Colt McCoy; 3 Brandon Weeden; Running backs (RB): 20 Montario Hardesty; 29 Brandon Jackson; 48 Owen Marecic FB; 25 Chris Ogbonnaya; 33 Trent Richardson; 47 Brad Smelley FB; Wide receivers (WR): 80 Travis Benjamin; 88 Josh Cooper; 16 Josh Cribbs; 13 Josh Gordon; 15 Greg Little; Tight ends (TE): 84 Jordan Cameron; 81 Alex Smith; 82 Ben Watson	Offensive linemen (OL): 75 Oniel Cousins T; 77 John Greco G; 66 Shawn Lauvao G; 55 Alex Mack C; 60 Ryan Miller G; 72 Mitchell Schwartz T; 74 Jarrod Shaw G; 73 Joe Thomas T; Defensive linemen (DL): 91 Hall Davis DE; 93 John Hughes DT; 67 Ishmaa'ily Kitchen DT; 95 Juqua Parker DE; 71 Ahtyba Rubin DT; 92 Frostee Rucker DE; 97 Jabaal Sheard DE; 98 Phil Taylor DT; 90 Billy Winn DT	Linebackers (LB): 94 Tank Carder OLB; 58 L. J. Fort OLB; 52 D'Qwell Jackson MLB; 56 Kaluka Maiava OLB; 54 Adrian Moten MLB; 53 Craig Robertson OLB; Defensive backs (DB): 37 Johnson Bademosi CB; 24 Sheldon Brown CB; 39 Tashaun Gipson FS; 23 Joe Haden CB; 27 Eric Hagg SS; 31 Prince Miller CB; 22 Buster Skrine CB; 41 Ray Ventrone FS; 26 Trevin Wade CB; Special teams (ST): 4 Phil Dawson K; 2 Reggie Hodges P; 57 Christian Yount LS	Practice squad: 65 Kendrick Adams DE; 63 Bryant Browning G; 87 George Bryan TE; 64 Ricky Elmore LB; 61 Garth Gerhart C; 36 Jordan Mabin CB; 17 Rod Windsor WR; 68 D. J. Young T; Reserve: 59 Emmanuel Acho MLB (IR); -- Auston English DE (IR); 99 Scott Fujita OLB (IR); 51 Chris Gocong OLB (IR); 50 James-Michael Johnson OLB (IR); 11 Mohamed Massaquoi WR (IR); 10 Jordan Norwood WR (IR/DFR); 62 Jason Pinkston G (IR); 70 Brian Sanford DE (IR); 96 Emmanuel Stephens DE (IR); 28 Usama Young FS (IR); 43 T. J. Ward SS (IR); 44 Eddie Williams FB (IR); Rookies in italics 53 active, 13 reserve, 8 practice squad

== Preseason ==
=== Schedule ===
Week	Date	Opponent	Result	Record	Game site	NFL.com recap
1	August 10	at Detroit Lions	W 19–17	1–0	Ford Field	Recap
2	August 16	at Green Bay Packers	W 35–10	2–0	Lambeau Field	Recap
3	August 24	Philadelphia Eagles	L 10–27	2–1	Cleveland Browns Stadium	Recap
4	August 30	Chicago Bears	L 20–28	2–2	Cleveland Browns Stadium	Recap

=== LB Gocong injury ===
On August 4, starting LB Chris Gocong tore his right Achilles tendon during morning practice. He will likely miss the entire season.

=== QB Weeden named starter ===
On August 6, coach Pat Shurmur named Brandon Weeden as the starting QB. Weeden, 28, was picked 22nd overall by the Browns in the 2012 NFL draft.

=== First roster cuts ===
All NFL teams were required to cut their rosters from 90 players to 75 by August 27. One day earlier, the Browns released nine players, most notably WR veteran WR Carlton Mitchell.

The Browns also placed LBs Emanuel Acho and Chris Gocong on injured reserve, waived/injured DEs Marcus Benard and Auston English and CB Antwaun Reed. The team also placed DT Phil Taylor on the physically unable to perform list.

With one open roster spot, the Browns claimed DE Ernest Owusu off waivers from the Minnesota Vikings.

=== Second roster cuts ===
All NFL teams were required to cut their rosters from 75 players to 53 by August 31. The Browns cut quarterback Seneca Wallace; running back Adonis Thomas; fullback Brad Smelley; wide receivers Josh Cooper and Rod Windsor, tight ends Dan Gronkowski and Evan Moore; offensive linemen Dominic Alford, Stanley Daniels, Garth Gerhart, Jerrod Shaw, and J.B. Shugarts; defensive linemen Ronnie Cameron, William Green, Ernest Owushu, Brian Schaefering, and Kiante Tripp; linebackers Benjamin Jacobs and Quinton Spears; and defensive back James Dockery. In addition, DT Phil Taylor remained on the physically unable to perform list.

Cameron, Cooper, Gerhart, Jacobs, Shaw, Shugarts, and Smelley were added to the Browns' practice squad.

=== Captains elected ===
On September 2, the Browns elected offensive tackle Joe Thomas, linebacker D'Qwell Jackson, and kicker Phil Dawson as captains.

== Regular season ==
=== Schedule ===
Week	Date	Opponent	Result	Record	Game site	NFL.com recap
1	September 9	Philadelphia Eagles	**L** 16–17	0–1	Cleveland Browns Stadium	Recap
2	September 16	at **Cincinnati Bengals**	**L** 27–34	0–2	Paul Brown Stadium	Recap
3	September 23	Buffalo Bills	**L** 14–24	0–3	Cleveland Browns Stadium	Recap
4	September 27	at **Baltimore Ravens**	**L** 16–23	0–4	M&T Bank Stadium	Recap
5	October 7	at New York Giants	**L** 27–41	0–5	MetLife Stadium	Recap
6	October 14	**Cincinnati Bengals**	**W** 34–24	1–5	Cleveland Browns Stadium	Recap
7	October 21	at Indianapolis Colts	**L** 13–17	1–6	Lucas Oil Stadium	Recap
8	October 28	San Diego Chargers	**W** 7–6	2–6	Cleveland Browns Stadium	Recap
9	November 4	**Baltimore Ravens**	**L** 15–25	2–7	Cleveland Browns Stadium	Recap
10	Bye					
11	November 18	at Dallas Cowboys	**L** 20–23 (OT)	2–8	Cowboys Stadium	Recap
12	November 25	**Pittsburgh Steelers**	**W** 20–14	3–8	Cleveland Browns Stadium	Recap
13	December 2	at Oakland Raiders	**W** 20–17	4–8	O.co Coliseum	Recap
14	December 9	Kansas City Chiefs	**W** 30–7	5–8	Cleveland Browns Stadium	Recap
15	December 16	Washington Redskins	**L** 21–38	5–9	Cleveland Browns Stadium	Recap
16	December 23	at Denver Broncos	**L** 12–34	5–10	Sports Authority Field at Mile High	Recap
17	December 30	at **Pittsburgh Steelers**	**L** 10–24	5–11	Heinz Field	Recap

Note: Intra-divisional opponents are in bold text.

=== Game summaries ===
==== Week 1: vs. Philadelphia Eagles ====
Week 1: Philadelphia Eagles at Cleveland Browns – Game summary

Quarter	1	2	3	4	Total
**Eagles**	0	10	0	7	**17**
Browns	3	0	3	10	**16**

at Cleveland Browns Stadium, Cleveland, Ohio

- Date: September 9
- Game time: 1:00 p.m. EDT
- Game weather: Sunny 68 °F (20 °C)
- Game attendance: 68,693
- Referee: Ken Roan
- TV announcers (Fox): Dick Stockton, John Lynch and Jennifer Hale

Game information

**First quarter**

- CLE – Phil Dawson 43-yard field goal, 9:16. Browns 3–0. **Drive: 6 plays, 26 yards, 1:57.**

**Second quarter**

- PHI – Alex Henery 42-yard field goal, 15:00. Tied 3–3. **Drive: 7 plays, 55 yards, 2:07.**
- PHI – Jeremy Maclin 18-yard pass from Michael Vick (Alex Henery kick), 0:23. Eagles 10–3. **Drive: 5 plays, 74 yards, 0:32.**

**Third quarter**

- CLE – Phil Dawson 42-yard field goal, 5:01. Eagles 10–6. **Drive: 7 plays, 19 yards, 2:22.**

**Fourth quarter**

- CLE – Phil Dawson 22-yard field goal, 14:17. Eagles 10–9. **Drive: 6 plays, 18 yards, 2:38.**
- CLE – D'Qwell Jackson 13-yard interception return (Phil Dawson kick), 14:10. Browns 16–10.
- PHI – Clay Harbor 4-yard pass from Michael Vick (Alex Henery kick), 1:23. Eagles 17–16. **Drive: 16 plays, 91 yards, 5:07.**

**Top passers**

- PHI – Michael Vick – 29/56, 317 yards, 2 TD, 4 INT
- CLE – Brandon Weeden – 12/35, 118 yards, 4 INT 1 TD

**Top rushers**

- PHI – LeSean McCoy – 20 rushes, 110 yards
- CLE – Trent Richardson – 19 rushes, 39 yards

**Top receivers**

- PHI – Jeremy Maclin – 7 receptions, 96 yards, 3TD
- CLE – Mohamed Massaquoi – 3 receptions, 41 yards

The Browns opened their season against the Philadelphia Eagles. They got their first points of the 2012 season when Phil Dawson kicked a 43-yard field goal to make the score 3–0 for the only points of the opening quarter. The Eagles responded to tie the game at 3–3 when Alex Henery kicked a 42-yard field goal followed by Michael Vick finding Jeremy Maclin in the end zone on an 18-yard touchdown pass to make the halftime score 10–3. Heading into the third quarter and extending into the 4th, the Browns scored 13 unanswered points starting with Dawson's field goals from 42 (for the only score of the quarter) and 22 yards out shortening the Eagles' lead from four to just a point from 10–6 to 10–9. And then, the Browns retook the lead when D'Qwell Jackson ran for a 13-yard touchdown for a 16–10 game. However, the Philadelphia Eagles were able to complete the comeback as Vick found Clay Harbor on a 4-yard pass making the final score 17–16.

The Browns started their season 0–1 for the eighth straight year.

==== Week 2: at Cincinnati Bengals ====
Week 2: Cleveland Browns at Cincinnati Bengals – Game summary

Quarter	1	2	3	4	Total
Browns	3	7	7	10	**27**
**Bengals**	7	10	7	10	**34**

at Paul Brown Stadium, Cincinnati, Ohio

- Date: September 16
- Game time: 1:00 pm. EDT
- Game weather: Sunny 66 °F (19 °C)
- Game attendance: 63,036
- Referee: Jerry Hughes
- TV announcers (CBS): Bill Macatee and Steve Tasker

Game information

**First quarter**

- CIN (13:35) – Adam Jones 81-yard punt return (Mike Nugent kick)
  **Bengals 7, Browns 0**
- CLE (9:06) – Phil Dawson 50-yard field goal
  **Bengals 7, Browns 3** Drive: 9 plays, 32 yards, 4:12

**Second quarter**

- CIN (10:33) – A. J. Green 10-yard pass from Andy Dalton (Mike Nugent kick)
  **Bengals 14, Browns 3** Drive: 8 plays, 74 yards, 4:25
- CLE (8:15) – Trent Richardson 32-yard run (Phil Dawson kick)
  **Bengals 14, Browns 10** Drive: 5 plays, 76 yards, 2:22
- CIN (4:49) – Mike Nugent 39-yard field goal
  **Bengals 17, Browns 10** Drive: 7 plays, 56 yards, 3:20

**Third quarter**

- CIN (12:05) – Brandon Tate 44-yard pass from Andy Dalton (Mike Nugent kick)
  **Bengals 24, Browns 10** Drive: 8 plays, 80 yards, 3:02
- CLE (0:20) – Trent Richardson 23-yard pass from Brandon Weeden (Phil Dawson kick)
  **Bengals 24, Browns 17** Drive: 5 plays, 53 yards, 2:12

**Fourth quarter**

- CIN (11:01) – Andrew Hawkins 50-yard pass from Andy Dalton (Mike Nugent kick)
  **Bengals 31, Browns 17** Drive: 8 plays, 77 yards, 4:23
- CLE (7:18) – Greg Little 24-yard pass from Brandon Weeden (Phil Dawson kick)
  **Bengals 31, Browns 24** Drive: 8 plays, 80 yards, 3:33
- CIN (2:14) – Mike Nugent 37-yard field goal
  **Bengals 34, Browns 24** Drive: 11 plays, 58 yards, 5:02
- CLE (0:20) – Phil Dawson 25-yard field goal
  **Bengals 34, Browns 27** Drive: 9 plays, 66 yards, 1:49

**Top passers**

- CLE – Brandon Weeden 26/37, 322 yards, 2 TD
- CIN – Andy Dalton 24/31, 318 yards, 3 TD, INT

**Top rushers**

- CLE – Trent Richardson 19 rushes, 109 yards, TD
- CIN – BenJarvus Green-Ellis 21 rushes, 75 yards

**Top receivers**

- CLE – Mohamed Massaquoi 5 receptions, 90 yards
- CIN – Brandon Tate 3 receptions, 71 yards, TD

After a tough home loss to the Eagles, the Browns traveled on the road to take on the Bengals for Round 1 of the Battle Of Ohio. With less than 90 seconds played, the Bengals scored as Pacman Jones returned a punt 81 yards for a touchdown making the score 7–0. The Browns responded with Phil Dawson's 50-yard field goal to come within 4 at 7–3. In the 2nd quarter Andy Dalton found A.J. Green on a 10-yard touchdown pass making the score 14–3 for an 11-point lead. The Browns followed up with Trent Richardson running for a 32-yard touchdown making the score 14–10 but the Bengals pulled away as Mike Nugent nailed a 39-yard field goal for a 17–10 halftime lead. In the 3rd quarter, the Bengals went right back to work when Dalton found Brandon Tate on a 44-yard touchdown pass to increase their lead to 24–10. Again, the Browns tried to rally by coming in just a touchdown short with Brandon Weeden's first NFL career touchdown pass, a 23-yard pass to Richardson to make the score 24–17. The Bengals pulled away in the 4th quarter as Dalton found Andrew Hawkins on a 50-yard pass making the score 31–17 but again, the Browns tried to rally by coming within a touchdown as Weeden found Greg Little on a 24-yard pass making the score 31–24. After this, the Bengals moved ahead by double digits for the first time since leading by 14 in the 3rd quarter with Nugent's 37-yard field goal for a 34–24 lead. The Browns tried to rally a comeback but could only come away with 3 points as Dawson nailed a 25-yard field goal for a final score of 34–27.

With the loss, the Browns fell to 0–2. Also, with the Steelers' victory over the Jets, the team now sits in sole possession of last place in the AFC North as well as losing by a certain number of points increasing as the weeks go by from losing to the Eagles by a point in Week 1 to losing to the Bengals by 7 points in Week 2.

==== Week 3: vs. Buffalo Bills ====
Week 3: Buffalo Bills at Cleveland Browns – Game summary

Quarter	1	2	3	4	Total
**Bills**	14	0	3	7	**24**
Browns	0	7	7	0	**14**

at Cleveland Browns Stadium, Cleveland, Ohio

- Date: September 23
- Game time: 1:00 pm. EDT
- Game weather: Occasional Showers 53 °F (12 °C)
- Game attendance: 69,353
- Referee: David Scott
- TV announcers (CBS): Spero Dedes and Steve Beuerlein

Game information

**First quarter**

- BUF (9:08) – T. J. Graham 9-yard pass from Ryan Fitzpatrick (Rian Lindell kick)
  **Bills 7, Browns 0** Drive: 8 plays, 58 yards, 4:21
- BUF (5:15) – C. J. Spiller 32-yard pass from Ryan Fitzpatrick (Rian Lindell kick)
  **Bills 14, Browns 0** Drive: 4 plays, 49 yards, 1:53

**Second quarter**

- CLE (2:17) – Trent Richardson 6-yard run (Phil Dawson kick)
  **Bills 14, Browns 7** Drive: 9 plays, 67 yards, 4:41

**Third quarter**

- BUF (10:42) – Rian Lindell 37-yard field goal
  **Bills 17, Browns 7** Drive: 9 plays, 51 yards, 4:22
- CLE (2:33) – Travis Benjamin 22-yard pass from Brandon Weeden (Phil Dawson kick)
  **Bills 17, Browns 14** Drive: 13 plays, 80 yards, 4:38

**Fourth quarter**

- BUF (9:12) – Stevie Johnson 9-yard pass from Ryan Fitzpatrick (Rian Lindell kick)
  **Bills 24, Browns 14** Drive: 10 plays, 68 yards, 5:27

**Top passers**

- BUF – Ryan Fitzpatrick 22/35, 208 yards, 3 TD
- CLE – Brandon Weeden 27/43, 237 yards, TD, 2 INT

**Top rushers**

- BUF – Tashard Choice 20 rushes, 91 yards
- CLE – Trent Richardson 12 rushes, 27 yards, TD

**Top receivers**

- BUF – Stevie Johnson 7 receptions, 61 yards, TD
- CLE – Jordan Cameron 5 receptions, 45 yards

The Browns returned home for a home game against the Bills. Again, the Browns fell behind and for the second straight week never held the lead as Bills QB Ryan Fitzpatrick found T. J. Graham on a 9-yard touchdown pass for a 7–0 lead followed up by Fitzpatrick finding C. J. Spiller on a 32-yard touchdown pass for a 14–0 lead. The Browns got on the board in the 2nd quarter when Trent Richardson ran for a 6-yard touchdown to make the score 14–7 at halftime. However, the Bills went back to work in the 3rd quarter as Rian Lindell nailed a 37-yard field goal to take a 10-point lead of 17–7. The Browns tried to rally coming within 3 points of the Bills when Brandon Weeden found Travis Benjamin on a 22-yard pass at 17–14. However, the Bills pulled away and wrapped this game up as Fitzpatrick found Stevie Johnson on a 9-yard touchdown pass for a final score of 24–14.

With the loss, the Browns fell to 0–3 with their loss by a certain number of points worsened to 10.

==== Week 4: at Baltimore Ravens ====
Week 4: Cleveland Browns at Baltimore Ravens – Game summary

Quarter	1	2	3	4	Total
Browns	0	7	3	6	**16**
**Ravens**	0	9	14	0	**23**

at M&T Bank Stadium, Baltimore, Maryland

- Date: September 27
- Game time: 8:20 pm. EDT
- Game weather: Cloudy, showers 77 °F (25 °C)
- Game attendance: 70,944
- Referee: Gene Steratore
- TV announcers (NFLN): Brad Nessler, Mike Mayock and Alex Flanagan

Game information

**First quarter**

- No scoring plays.

**Second quarter**

- BAL (12:57) – Torrey Smith 18-yard pass from Joe Flacco (kick aborted)
  **Ravens 6, Browns 0** Drive: 6 plays, 85 yards, 2:53
- BAL (10:03) – Justin Tucker 45-yard field goal
  **Ravens 9, Browns 0** Drive: 7 plays, 32 yards, 1:58
- CLE (2:32) – Trent Richardson 2-yard run (Phil Dawson kick)
  **Ravens 9, Browns 7** Drive: 11 plays, 94 yards, 4:52

**Third quarter**

- BAL (9:53) – Joe Flacco 1-yard run (Justin Tucker kick)
  **Ravens 16, Browns 7** Drive: 13 plays, 89 yards, 5:07
- CLE (6:52) – Phil Dawson 51-yard field goal
  **Ravens 16, Browns 10** Drive: 8 plays, 53 yards, 3:01
- BAL (0:15) – Cary Williams 63-yard interception return (Justin Tucker kick)
  **Ravens 23, Browns 10**

**Fourth quarter**

- CLE (12:11) – Phil Dawson 50-yard field goal
  **Ravens 23, Browns 13** Drive: 8 plays, 48 yards, 3:04
- CLE (4:33) – Phil Dawson 52-yard field goal
  **Ravens 23, Browns 16** Drive: 5 plays, 12 yards, 1:35

**Top passers**

- CLE – Brandon Weeden 25/52, 320 yards, INT
- BAL – Joe Flacco 28/46, 356 yards, TD, INT

**Top rushers**

- CLE – Trent Richardson 14 rushes, 47 yards, TD
- BAL – Ray Rice 18 rushes, 49 yards

**Top receivers**

- CLE – Greg Little 4 receptions, 77 yards
- BAL – Anquan Boldin 9 receptions, 131 yards

The Browns traveled to Baltimore to take on the Ravens on Thursday Night Football. After a scoreless first quarter, the Ravens scored first in the second quarter as Joe Flacco found Torrey Smith on an 18-yard touchdown pass (with a failed PAT) for a 6–0 lead. The team increased their lead as Justin Tucker made a 45-yard field goal to make the score 9–0. Finally, the Browns scored not long before halftime when Trent Richardson ran for a 2-yard touchdown, making the halftime score 9–7. After the break, the Ravens went right back to work as Flacco threw several completions to Anquan Boldin before scoring on a 1-yard touchdown run for a 16–7 lead. However, The Browns drew within 6 points as Phil Dawson nailed a 51-yard field goal, making the score 16–10. But then, the Ravens pulled away as Cary Williams picked off Weeden and returned the ball 63 yards for a touchdown, making the score 23–10. In the fourth quarter, the Browns tried to come back as Dawson nailed two field goals from 50 and 52 yards out making the score 23–13 and then 23–16, respectively. However, the Ravens took control of the game and the Browns' record dropped to 0–4 on the season, losing their 13th straight game against a division rival and their 9th straight game against the Ravens.

==== Week 5: at New York Giants ====
Week 5: Cleveland Browns at New York Giants – Game summary

Quarter	1	2	3	4	Total
Browns	14	3	3	7	**27**
**Giants**	7	20	7	7	**41**

at MetLife Stadium, East Rutherford, New Jersey

- Date: October 7
- Game time: 1:00 pm. EDT
- Game weather: Rain 51 °F (11 °C)
- Game attendance: 79,911
- Referee: Clete Blakeman
- TV announcers (CBS): Greg Gumbel and Dan Dierdorf

Game information

**First quarter**

- CLE (14:17) – Trent Richardson 15-yard run (Phil Dawson kick)
  **Browns 7, Giants 0** Drive: 2 plays, 22 yards, 0:37
- CLE (10:14) – Josh Gordon 62-yard pass from Brandon Weeden (Phil Dawson kick)
  **Browns 14, Giants 0** Drive: 5 plays, 80 yards, 2:11
- NYG (3:22) – Victor Cruz 3-yard pass from Eli Manning (Lawrence Tynes kick)
  **Browns 14, Giants 7** Drive: 11 plays, 92 yards, 6:41

**Second quarter**

- CLE (13:48) – Phil Dawson 32-yard field goal
  **Browns 17, Giants 7** Drive: 10 plays, 50 yards, 4:43
- NYG (6:49) – Lawrence Tynes 29-yard field goal
  **Browns 17, Giants 10** Drive: 14 plays, 68 yards, 6:53
- NYG (2:59) – Ahmad Bradshaw 4-yard run (Lawrence Tynes kick)
  **Browns 17, Giants 17** Drive: 2 plays, 40 yards, 0:54
- NYG (1:16) – Victor Cruz 7-yard pass from Eli Manning (Lawrence Tynes kick)
  **Giants 24, Browns 17** Drive: 5 plays, 29 yards, 1:27
- NYG (0:04) – Lawrence Tynes 40-yard field goal
  **Giants 27, Browns 17** Drive: 2 plays, 36 yards, 0:17

**Third quarter**

- NYG (5:14) – Victor Cruz 28-yard pass from Eli Manning (Lawrence Tynes kick)
  **Giants 34, Browns 17** Drive: 9 plays, 95 yards, 5:13
- CLE (3:37) – Phil Dawson 41-yard field goal
  **Giants 34, Browns 20** Drive: 4 plays, 7 yards, 1:39

**Fourth quarter**

- NYG (5:41) – David Wilson 40-yard rush (Lawrence Tynes kick)
  **Giants 41, Browns 20** Drive: 6 plays, 80 yards, 3:24
- CLE (3:56) – Josh Gordon 20-yard pass from Brandon Weeden (Phil Dawson kick)
  **Giants 41, Browns 27** Drive: 7 plays, 76 yards, 1:45

**Top passers**

- CLE – Brandon Weeden 22/35, 291 yards, 2 TD, 2 INT
- NYG – Eli Manning 25/37, 259 yards, 3 TD, INT

**Top rushers**

- CLE – Trent Richardson 17 rushes, 81 yards, TD
- NYG – Ahmad Bradshaw 30 rushes, 200 yards, TD

**Top receivers**

- CLE – Josh Gordon 2 receptions, 82 yards, 2 TD
- NYG – Rueben Randle 6 receptions, 82 yards

After a tough road loss to the Ravens, the Browns went to face against the Giants on the road. They drew first blood taking a 7–0 lead as Trent Richardson ran for a 15-yard touchdown followed by Brandon Weeden finding Josh Gordon on a 62-yard touchdown pass leaving the Browns with a 14–0 lead. Finally, the Giants were able to get on the board when Eli Manning found Victor Cruz on a 3-yard pass to shorten the lead 14–7. In the 2nd quarter, the Browns moved ahead by double digits again as Phil Dawson kicked a 32-yard field goal for a 17–7. The Giants then again responded by scoring 17 unanswered points before halftime starting by coming within a touchdown off of Lawrence Tynes' 29-yard field goal making the score 17–10. Then the Giants were able to tie it as Ahmad Bradshaw ran for a 4-yard touchdown for a 17–17 score before the Giants took the lead as Manning found Cruz again on a 7-yard pass making the score 24–17. Tynes made the score 27–17 with a 40-yard field goal not long before halftime. The Giants went right back to work in the third quarter as Manning found Cruz a 3rd time on a 28-yard pass increasing their lead to 34–17. Then the Browns tried to rally a comeback but only came away with Dawson nailing a 41-yard field goal making the score 34–20. Then in the fourth quarter, David Wilson ran for a 40-yard touchdown making the score 41–20. The Browns wrapped up the game scoring with Weeden finding Gordon again on a 20-yard pass for a final score of 41–27.

The Browns dropped to 0–5 on the season. And with the Saints' win over the Chargers on Sunday Night, they remain the league's only winless team.

==== Week 6: vs. Cincinnati Bengals ====
Week 6: Cincinnati Bengals at Cleveland Browns – Game summary

Quarter	1	2	3	4	Total
Bengals	7	7	0	10	**24**
**Browns**	0	7	6	21	**34**

at Cleveland Browns Stadium, Cleveland, Ohio

- Date: October 14
- Game time: 1:00 pm. EDT
- Game weather: Cloudy/Rain 70 °F (21 °C)
- Game attendance: 67,060
- Referee: Pete Morelli
- TV announcers (CBS): Kevin Harlan and Solomon Wilcots

Game information

**First quarter**

- CIN (7:07) – Jermaine Gresham 55-yard pass from Andy Dalton (Mike Nugent kick)
  **Bengals 7, Browns 0** Drive: 3 plays, 63 yards, 1:35

**Second quarter**

- CLE (14:51) – Josh Gordon 71-yard pass from Brandon Weeden (Phil Dawson kick)
  **Bengals 7, Browns 7** Drive: 6 plays, 87 yards, 2:11
- CIN (1:54) – A. J. Green 4-yard pass from Andy Dalton (Mike Nugent kick)
  **Bengals 14, Browns 7** Drive: 3 plays, 27 yards, 1:23

**Third quarter**

- CLE (8:25) – Phil Dawson 41-yard field goal
  **Bengals 14, Browns 10** Drive: 4 plays, 7 yards, 1:28
- CLE (6:27) – Phil Dawson 38-yard field goal
  **Bengals 14, Browns 13** Drive: 4 plays, 5 yards, 1:05

**Fourth quarter**

- CLE (14:56) – Montario Hardesty 1-yard run (Phil Dawson kick)
  **Browns 20, Bengals 14** Drive: 10 plays, 66 yards, 5:17
- CIN (11:11) – Mike Nugent 44-yard field goal
  **Browns 20, Bengals 17** Drive: 8 plays, 34 yards, 3:45
- CLE (8:00) – Benjamin Watson 4-yard pass from Brandon Weeden (Phil Dawson kick)
  **Browns 27, Bengals 17** Drive: 6 plays, 63 yards, 3:11
- CLE (7:50) – Sheldon Brown 17-yard interception return (Phil Dawson kick)
  **Browns 34, Bengals 17**
- CIN (5:21) – A. J. Green 57-yard pass from Andy Dalton (Mike Nugent kick)
  **Browns 34, Bengals 24** Drive: 6 plays, 79 yards, 2:29

**Top passers**

- CIN – Andy Dalton 31/46, 381 yards, 3 TD, 3 INT
- CLE – Brandon Weeden 17/29, 231 yards, 2 TD, INT

**Top rushers**

- CIN – BenJarvus Green-Ellis 16 rushes, 62 yards
- CLE – Montario Hardesty 15 rushes, 56 yards, TD

**Top receivers**

- CIN – A. J. Green 7 receptions, 135 yards, 2 TD
- CLE – Josh Gordon 3 receptions, 99 yards, TD

The Browns returned home for Round 2 of 2012's Battle of Ohio. The Bengals got off to a fast start in the first quarter as Andy Dalton found Jermaine Gresham on a 55-yard touchdown pass making the score 7–0 for the only score of the period. The Browns then managed to tie it as Brandon Weeden found Josh Gordon on a 71-yard touchdown pass for a 7–7 game before the Bengals moved back into the lead with Dalton's 4-yard pass to A. J. Green making the score 14–7 at halftime. The Browns went into a frenzy of points in the 2nd half starting scoring 13 unanswered points starting in the 3rd quarter when Phil Dawson nailed two field goals from 41 and 38 yards out making the score 14–10 and then 14–13 respectively. And in the fourth quarter, they took the lead as Montario Hardestly ran for a 1-yard touchdown for a 20–14 lead. The Bengals came within three points as Mike Nugent kicked a 44-yard field goal making the score 20–17. But the Browns increased their lead with two straight touchdowns as Weeden found Benjamin Watson on a 4-yard pass followed by Sheldon Brown who returned an interception 17 yards for a touchdown making the score 27–17 and then 34–17. The Bengals tried to rally a comeback as Dalton found Green again on a 57-yard pass. But the Bengals failed to rally and therefore lost this game by a final score of 34–24 as the Browns managed to snap their four-game losing streak to the Bengals as well as their 13-game losing streak to division rivals as they improved to 1–5 with the win.

==== Week 7: at Indianapolis Colts ====
Week 7: Cleveland Browns at Indianapolis Colts – Game summary

Quarter	1	2	3	4	Total
Browns	0	6	7	0	**13**
**Colts**	7	7	3	0	**17**

at Lucas Oil Stadium, Indianapolis, Indiana

- Date: October 21
- Game time: 1:00 pm. EDT
- Game weather: Sunny 60 °F (16 °C)
- Game attendance: 64,560
- Referee: Carl Cheffers
- TV announcers (CBS): Kevin Harlan and Solomon Wilcots

Game information

**First quarter**

- IND (7:23) – Andrew Luck 3-yard run (Adam Vinatieri kick)
  **Colts 7, Browns 0** Drive: 11 plays, 80 yards, 7:37

**Second quarter**

- CLE (14:01) – Greg Little 14-yard pass from Brandon Weeden (kick aborted)
  **Colts 7, Browns 6** Drive: 16 plays, 90 yards, 8:22
- IND (7:41) – Andrew Luck 5-yard run (Adam Vinatieri kick)
  **Colts 14, Browns 6** Drive: 14 plays, 76 yards, 6:20

**Third quarter**

- CLE (11:53) – Josh Gordon 33-yard pass from Brandon Weeden (Phil Dawson kick)
  **Colts 14, Browns 13** Drive: 6 plays, 80 yards, 3:07
- IND (3:19) – Adam Vinatieri 38-yard field goal
  **Colts 17, Browns 13** Drive: 17 plays, 61 yards, 8:34

**Fourth quarter**

- No scoring plays.

**Top passers**

- CLE – Brandon Weeden 25/41, 264 yards, 2 TD
- IND – Andrew Luck 16/29, 186 yards

**Top rushers**

- CLE – Montario Hardesty 7 rushes, 28 yards
- IND – Vick Ballard 20 rushes, 84 yards

**Top receivers**

- CLE – Josh Gordon 2 receptions, 59 yards, TD
- IND – Reggie Wayne 6 receptions, 73 yards

The Browns traveled to Indianapolis to take on an Andrew Luck-led Colts offense. The Colts were able to score in the first quarter as Andrew Luck ran for a 3-yard touchdown making the score 7–0 for the only score of the game. The Browns responded in the 2nd quarter coming within a point when Brandon Weeden found Greg Little on a 14-yard pass (with a failed PAT) making the score 7–6. Then, Luck ran for another touchdown this time from 5 yards out to make the score 14–6 at halftime. The Browns came within a point again in the 3rd quarter as Weeden found Josh Gordon on a 33-yard pass making the score 14–13 but the Colts wrapped things up with Adam Vinatieri's 38-yard field goal followed by a scoreless 4th quarter making the final score 17–13 as the Browns' road record at this point of the season was 0–4 while their record overall was 1–6.

==== Week 8: vs. San Diego Chargers ====
Week 8: San Diego Chargers at Cleveland Browns – Game summary

Quarter	1	2	3	4	Total
Chargers	0	3	3	0	**6**
**Browns**	7	0	0	0	**7**

at Cleveland Browns Stadium, Cleveland, Ohio

- Date: October 28
- Game time: 1:00 pm. EDT
- Game weather: Rainy/Windy 44 °F (7 °C)
- Game attendance: 65,337
- Referee: Jerome Boger
- TV announcers (CBS): Spero Dedes and Rich Gannon

Game information

**First quarter**

- CLE (4:26) – Trent Richardson 26-yard run (Phil Dawson kick)
  **Browns 7, Chargers 0** Drive: 12 plays, 70 yards, 4:35

**Second quarter**

- SD (0:03) – Nick Novak 43-yard field goal
  **Browns 7, Chargers 3** Drive: 10 plays, 55 yards, 1:48

**Third quarter**

- SD (2:36) – Nick Novak 31-yard field goal
  **Browns 7, Chargers 6** Drive: 9 plays, 30 yards, 4:36

**Fourth quarter**

- No scoring plays.

**Top passers**

- SD – Philip Rivers 18/34, 154 yards
- CLE – Brandon Weeden 11/27, 129 yards

**Top rushers**

- SD – Ryan Mathews 24 rushes, 95 yards
- CLE – Trent Richardson 24 rushes, 122 yards, TD

**Top receivers**

- SD – Ronnie Brown 7 receptions, 85 yards
- CLE – Josh Gordon 3 receptions, 46 yards

In rainy and windy conditions, Trent Richardson scored the game's only touchdown, running from 26 yards out for a 7–0 lead. The Chargers managed to get on the board as Nick Novak score a 43-yard field goal before halftime making the score 7–3. The Chargers then scored the only points of the second half in the third quarter, with Novak scoring a 31-yard field goal making the score 7–6. There were no further scores and the Browns increased their record to 2–6 and their home record to 2–2.

==== Week 9: vs. Baltimore Ravens ====
Week 9: Baltimore Ravens at Cleveland Browns – Game summary

Quarter	1	2	3	4	Total
**Ravens**	14	0	0	11	**25**
Browns	0	9	3	3	**15**

at Cleveland Browns Stadium, Cleveland, Ohio

- Date: November 4
- Game time: 1:00 pm. EST
- Game weather: Cloudy 39 °F (4 °C)
- Game attendance: 65,449
- Referee: Jeff Triplette
- TV announcers (CBS): Marv Albert and Rich Gannon

Game information

**First quarter**

- BAL (8:32) – Ray Rice 8-yard run (Justin Tucker kick)
  **Ravens 7, Browns 0** Drive: 10 plays, 70 yards, 5:25
- BAL (0:01) – Bernard Pierce 12-yard run (Justin Tucker kick)
  **Ravens 14, Browns 0** Drive: 12 plays, 66 yards, 6:52

**Second quarter**

- CLE (9:19) – Phil Dawson 32-yard field goal
  **Ravens 14, Browns 3** Drive: 12 plays, 66 yards, 5:42
- CLE (1:47) – Phil Dawson 28-yard field goal
  **Ravens 14, Browns 6** Drive: 10 plays, 76 yards, 4:05
- CLE (0:03) – Phil Dawson 29-yard field goal
  **Ravens 14, Browns 9** Drive: 7 plays, 50 yards, 1:00

**Third quarter**

- CLE (2:39) – Phil Dawson 33-yard field goal
  **Ravens 14, Browns 12** Drive: 10 plays, 41 yards, 5:30

**Fourth quarter**

- CLE (8:48) – Phil Dawson 41-yard field goal
  **Browns 15, Ravens 14** Drive: 9 plays, 34 yards, 4:32
- BAL (4:26) – Torrey Smith 19-yard pass from Joe Flacco (Joe Flacco pass to Anquan Boldin)
  **Ravens 22, Browns 15** Drive: 9 plays, 81 yards, 4:22
- BAL (2:49) – Justin Tucker 43-yard field goal
  **Ravens 25, Browns 15** Drive: 4 plays, 4 yards, 1:01

**Top passers**

- BAL – Joe Flacco 15/24, 153 yards, TD
- CLE – Brandon Weeden 20/37, 176 yards, 2 INT

**Top rushers**

- BAL – Ray Rice 25 rushes, 98 yards, TD
- CLE – Trent Richardson 25 rushes, 105 yards

**Top receivers**

- BAL – Anquan Boldin 5 receptions, 57 yards
- CLE – Greg Little 5 receptions, 52 yards

The Ravens took a 14–0 lead after the first quarter, but the Browns took the lead with five consecutive field goals from Phil Dawson. However, the Ravens retook the lead for good in the fourth quarter. With their 10th-straight loss to the Ravens, the Browns went into their bye week at 2–7.

==== Week 11: at Dallas Cowboys ====
Week 11: Cleveland Browns at Dallas Cowboys – Game summary

Quarter	1	2	3	4	OT	Total
Browns	7	6	0	7	0	**20**
**Cowboys**	0	0	3	17	3	**23**

at Cowboys Stadium, Arlington, Texas

- Date: November 18
- Game time: 1:00 pm. EST/12:00 p.m. CST
- Game weather: Played indoors (retractable roof closed)
- Game attendance: 81,936
- Referee: Ed Hochuli
- TV announcers (CBS): Greg Gumbel and Dan Dierdorf

Game information

**First quarter**

- CLE (4:01) – Benjamin Watson 10-yard pass from Brandon Weeden (Phil Dawson kick)
  **Browns 7, Cowboys 0** Drive: 10 plays, 48 yards, 4:55

**Second quarter**

- CLE (12:09) – Phil Dawson 51-yard field goal
  **Browns 10, Cowboys 0** Drive: 9 plays, 51 yards, 3:44
- CLE (5:07) – Phil Dawson 37-yard field goal
  **Browns 13, Cowboys 0** Drive: 11 plays, 55 yards, 4:16

**Third quarter**

- DAL (4:16) – Dan Bailey 44-yard field goal
  **Browns 13, Cowboys 3** Drive: 9 plays, 54 yards, 5:44

**Fourth quarter**

- DAL (13:49) – Felix Jones 2-yard run (Dan Bailey kick)
  **Browns 13, Cowboys 10** Drive: 8 plays, 89 yards, 3:59
- DAL (6:46) – Dez Bryant 28-yard pass from Tony Romo (Dan Bailey kick)
  **Cowboys 17, Browns 13** Drive: 9 plays, 58 yards, 5:11
- CLE (1:07) – Benjamin Watson 17-yard pass from Brandon Weeden (Phil Dawson kick)
  **Browns 20, Cowboys 17** Drive: 1 play, 17 yards, 0:03
- DAL (0:02) – Dan Bailey 32-yard field goal
  **Browns 20, Cowboys 20** Drive: 8 plays, 66 yards, 1:05

**Overtime**

- DAL (6:07) – Dan Bailey 38-yard field goal
  **Cowboys 23, Browns 20** Drive: 7 plays, 28 yards, 3:32

**Top passers**

- CLE – Brandon Weeden 20/35, 210 yards, 2 TD
- DAL – Tony Romo 35/50, 313 yards, TD

**Top rushers**

- CLE – Trent Richardson 28 rushes, 95 yards
- DAL – Felix Jones 14 rushes, 43 yards, TD

**Top receivers**

- CLE – Josh Gordon 5 receptions, 53 yards
- DAL – Dez Bryant 12 receptions, 145 yards, TD

The Browns came into Cowboys Stadium leading 13–0 at halftime. However, the lead was blown as the Browns were outscored 20–7 in the 2nd half with the Cowboys kicking a late field goal to tie the game at 20–20 and send it into overtime. There, the Cowboys kicked the game-winning field goal, dropping the Browns to 2–8 and 0–3 against the NFC East.

==== Week 12: vs. Pittsburgh Steelers ====
Week 12: Pittsburgh Steelers at Cleveland Browns – Game summary

Quarter	1	2	3	4	Total
Steelers	7	7	0	0	**14**
**Browns**	3	10	7	0	**20**

at Cleveland Browns Stadium, Cleveland, Ohio

- Date: November 25
- Game time: 1:00 pm. EST
- Game weather: Mostly Cloudy 40 °F (4 °C)
- Referee: Ron Winter
- TV announcers (CBS): Kevin Harlan and Solomon Wilcots

Game information

**First quarter**

- PIT (14:00) – Lawrence Timmons 53-yard interception return (Shaun Suisham kick)
  **Steelers 7, Browns 0**
- CLE (9:10) – Phil Dawson 28-yard field goal
  **Steelers 7, Browns 3** Drive: 7 plays, 33 yards, 3:13

**Second quarter**

- CLE (12:25) – Jordan Cameron 5-yard pass from Brandon Weeden (Phil Dawson kick)
  **Browns 10, Steelers 7** Drive: 3 plays, 10 yards, 1:21
- CLE (3:45) – Phil Dawson 32-yard field goal
  **Browns 13, Steelers 7** Drive: 10 plays, 44 yards, 5:34
- PIT (0:07) – Chris Rainey 1-yard run (Shaun Suisham kick)
  **Steelers 14, Browns 13** Drive: 9 plays, 84 yards, 1:50

**Third quarter**

- CLE (5:25) – Trent Richardson 15-yard run (Phil Dawson kick)
  **Browns 20, Steelers 14** Drive: 3 plays, 31 yards, 1:46

**Fourth quarter**

- No scoring plays.

**Top passers**

- PIT – Charlie Batch 19/33, 199 yards, 3 INT
- CLE – Brandon Weeden 17/26, 158 yards, TD, INT

**Top rushers**

- PIT – Jonathan Dwyer 9 rushes, 19 yards
- CLE – Trent Richardson 29 rushes, 85 yards, TD

**Top receivers**

- PIT – Emmanuel Sanders 5 receptions, 73 yards
- CLE – Josh Gordon 4 receptions, 60 yards

Although the Steelers scored first on a 53-yard interception return by Lawrence Timmons, the Browns benefited from eight Pittsburgh turnovers and the Browns defeated the Steelers 20–14. This was the first Browns victory over the Steelers since Week 14 of the 2009 season, and only the fifth time the Browns beat the Steelers since returning to the NFL in 1999. The Browns became the only AFC North team on the season to successfully defend their home territory against the Steelers. After the game, it was announced that team president Mike Holmgren would leave the Browns with immediate effect.

==== Week 13: at Oakland Raiders ====
Week 13: Cleveland Browns at Oakland Raiders – Game summary

Quarter	1	2	3	4	Total
**Browns**	0	10	3	7	**20**
Raiders	0	3	7	7	**17**

at O.co Coliseum, Oakland, California

- Date: December 2
- Game time: 4:25 pm. EST/1:25 p.m. PST
- Game weather: Cloudy skies 61 °F (16 °C)
- Game attendance: 43,641
- Referee: Bill Leavy
- TV announcers (CBS): Bill Macatee and Steve Tasker

Game information

**First quarter**

- No scoring plays.

**Second quarter**

- CLE (12:59) – Phil Dawson 41-yard field goal
  **Browns 3, Raiders 0** Drive: 13 plays, 57 yards, 6:27
- CLE (10:25) – Josh Gordon 44-yard pass from Brandon Weeden (Phil Dawson kick)
  **Browns 10, Raiders 0** Drive: 2 plays, 62 yards, 0:49
- OAK (4:28) – Sebastian Janikowski 51-yard field goal
  **Browns 10, Raiders 3** Drive: 8 plays, 37 yards, 2:44

**Third quarter**

- CLE (9:51) – Phil Dawson 35-yard field goal
  **Browns 13, Raiders 3** Drive: 10 plays, 48 yards, 5:09
- OAK (0:17) – Rod Streater 64-yard pass from Carson Palmer (S. Janikowski kick)
  **Browns 13, Raiders 10** Drive: 4 plays, 80 yards, 1:41

**Fourth quarter**

- CLE (3:27) – Trent Richardson 3-yard run (Phil Dawson kick)
  **Browns 20, Raiders 10** Drive: 14 plays, 94 yards, 6:04
- OAK (0:01) – Brandon Myers 17-yard pass from Carson Palmer (S. Janikowski kick)
  **Browns 20, Raiders 17** Drive: 15 plays, 84 yards, 3:26

**Top passers**

- CLE – Brandon Weeden 25/36, 364 yards, TD, 2 INT
- OAK – Carson Palmer 34/54, 351 yards, 2 TD, INT

**Top rushers**

- CLE – Trent Richardson 20 rushes, 72 yards, TD
- OAK – Jeremy Stewart 9 rushes, 46 yards

**Top receivers**

- CLE – Josh Gordon 6 receptions, 116 yards, TD
- OAK – Brandon Myers 14 receptions, 130 yards, TD

Behind Brandon Weeden's career high passing day (364 yards), the Browns defeated the Oakland Raiders 20–17, snapping a 12-game road losing streak, and their first consecutive wins since Weeks 2 and 3 of the 2011 season. The win would also knock Oakland out of the playoff race.

==== Week 14: vs. Kansas City Chiefs ====
Week 14: Kansas City Chiefs at Cleveland Browns – Game summary

Quarter	1	2	3	4	Total
Chiefs	7	0	0	0	**7**
**Browns**	3	7	10	10	**30**

at Cleveland Browns Stadium, Cleveland, Ohio

- Date: December 9
- Game time: 1:00 pm. EST
- Game weather: Overcast/Rainy 45 °F (7 °C)
- Game attendance: 62,422
- Referee: Walt Anderson
- TV announcers (CBS): Bill Macatee and Steve Tasker

Game information

**First quarter**

- KC (15:00) – Jamaal Charles 80-yard run (Ryan Succop kick)
  **Chiefs 7, Browns 0** Drive: 1 play, 80 yards, 0:12
- CLE (3:56) – Phil Dawson 23-yard field goal
  **Chiefs 7, Browns 3** Drive: 11 plays, 76 yards, 4:00

**Second quarter**

- CLE (15:00) – Travis Benjamin 93-yard punt return (Phil Dawson kick)
  **Browns 10, Chiefs 7**

**Third quarter**

- CLE (12:28) – Trent Richardson 1-yard run (Phil Dawson kick)
  **Browns 17, Chiefs 7** Drive: 7 plays, 60 yards, 2:32
- CLE (8:45) – Phil Dawson 24-yard field goal
  **Browns 20, Chiefs 7** Drive: 5 plays, 7 yards, 2:23

**Fourth quarter**

- CLE (14:21) – Trent Richardson 1-yard run (Phil Dawson kick)
  **Browns 27, Chiefs 7** Drive: 12 plays, 82 yards, 6:25
- CLE (9:08) – Phil Dawson 34-yard field goal
  **Browns 30, Chiefs 7** Drive: 6 plays, 18 yards, 2:50

**Top passers**

- KC – Brady Quinn 11/22, 159 yards, INT
- CLE – Brandon Weeden 17/30, 217 yards

**Top rushers**

- KC – Jamaal Charles 18 rushes, 165 yards, TD
- CLE – Montario Hardesty 10 rushes, 52 yards

**Top receivers**

- KC – Dwayne Bowe 2 receptions, 70 yards
- CLE – Josh Gordon 8 receptions, 86 yards

Helped by a 93-yard punt return by Travis Benjamin (the longest punt return for a touchdown in franchise history), the Browns defeated the Kansas City Chiefs 30–7 for their first three-game win streak since 2009, improving their current season to 5–8 and 3–0 against the AFC West. With losses by the Bengals and Steelers (both 7–6), the Browns still remain in playoff contention moving up to only two games behind their two longest rivals. This remained the Browns' only December victory until a 24–10 win over the San Francisco 49ers in 2015.

==== Week 15: vs. Washington Redskins ====
Week 15: Washington Redskins at Cleveland Browns – Game summary

Quarter	1	2	3	4	Total
**Redskins**	7	3	14	14	**38**
Browns	7	7	0	7	**21**

at Cleveland Browns Stadium, Cleveland, Ohio

- Date: December 16
- Game time: 1:00 pm. EST
- Game weather: Cloudy 58 °F (14 °C)
- Game attendance: 65,083
- Referee: Bill Vinovich
- TV announcers (Fox): Ron Pitts, Mike Martz and Krista Voda

With the loss, the Browns fell to 5–9 and were eliminated from the postseason contention. This loss clinched the team's fifth straight losing season and 12th in the 14 years since rejoining the NFL. The Browns were 4–4 in home games.

==== Week 16: at Denver Broncos ====
Week Sixteen: Cleveland Browns at Denver Broncos – Game summary

Quarter	1	2	3	4	Total
Browns	3	0	3	6	**12**
**Broncos**	7	7	7	13	**34**

at Sports Authority Field at Mile High, Denver, Colorado

- Date: December 23
- Game time: 4:05 pm. EST/2:05 p.m. MST
- Game weather: Partly cloudy 51 °F (11 °C)
- Game attendance: 76,351
- Referee: Alberto Riveron
- TV announcers (CBS): Ian Eagle and Dan Fouts

With the loss, the Browns dropped to 5–10 on the season, and as a result they officially clinched fourth place in the AFC North for the second straight season since they still remained two games behind the third-placed Steelers (7–8), who got booted from the playoff race by the Bengals earlier that day.

Next week the Browns look to win in Pittsburgh for the first time since 2003, and sweep the Steelers for the first time since 1988.

==== Week 17: at Pittsburgh Steelers ====
Week Seventeen: Cleveland Browns at Pittsburgh Steelers – Game summary

Quarter	1	2	3	4	Total
Browns	0	3	7	0	**10**
**Steelers**	0	10	7	7	**24**

at Heinz Field, Pittsburgh, Pennsylvania

- Date: December 30
- Game time: 1:00 pm. EST
- Game weather: Cloudy 28 °F (−2 °C)
- Game attendance: 51,831
- Referee: Walt Coleman
- TV announcers (CBS): Spero Dedes and Steve Beuerlein

After a tough loss at the Broncos, the Browns traveled to Pittsburgh for game 2 of the 2012 series. The Browns were able to tie the game at 3–3 and then 10–10. However, they were overpowered by the Steelers as they scored 14 unanswered points to make the final score 24–10. The Browns went on to lose the game, finishing 5–11 for the season. They finished 1–7 in games away from home.

The day after the game, the Browns fired head coach Pat Shurmur and general manager Tom Heckert. In two seasons as Browns head coach, Shurmur posted a record of 9–23, including a disappointing 2–10 mark within the division (1–3 vs. the Bengals and Steelers and 0–4 vs. the Ravens).

=== Standings ===
AFC North
	W	L	T	PCT	DIV	CONF	PF	PA	STK
^{(4)} Baltimore Ravens	10	6	0	.625	4–2	8–4	398	344	L1
^{(6)} Cincinnati Bengals	10	6	0	.625	3–3	7–5	391	320	W3
Pittsburgh Steelers	8	8	0	.500	3–3	5–7	336	314	W1
Cleveland Browns	5	11	0	.313	2–4	5–7	302	368	L3

== 2013 Pro Bowl ==
On December 26, T Joe Thomas and K Phil Dawson were recognized for their individual accomplishments by being named to the AFC Pro Bowl roster. Thomas, who will be the starting left tackle, is making his sixth consecutive appearance in the Pro Bowl, while this is the first Pro Bowl appearance for Dawson in his 14-year career.

KR Joshua Cribbs, LB D'Qwell Jackson, and C Alex Mack were named first alternates at their respective positions.
