= Perry Stevenson =

American basketball player and coach

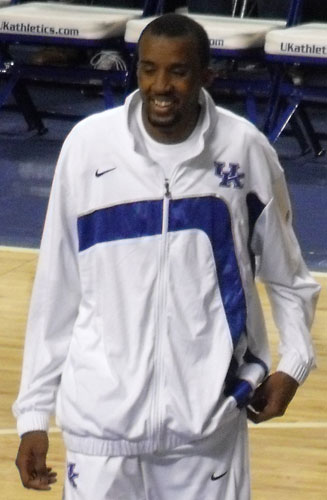
- Stevenson in warm-ups before a game

Personal information
- Born: January 23, 1987 (age 38); Lafayette, Louisiana, U.S.
- Listed height: 6 ft 9 in (2.06 m)
- Listed weight: 220 lb (100 kg)

Career information
- High school: Northside (Lafayette, Louisiana)
- College: Kentucky (2006–2010)
- NBA draft: 2010: undrafted
- Playing career: 2010–2012
- Position: Power forward

Career history
- 2010: Tulsa 66ers
- 2010–2011: Rochester Razorsharks
- 2012: South Carolina Warriors
- 2012: Galitos Tley

Perry George Stevenson (born January 23, 1987) is an American high school basketball coach and former basketball player. He is currently an assistant coach at Missouri Western University.

A power forward, Stevenson played for the University of Kentucky men's basketball team. In his first regular season collegiate game on November 15, 2006, Perry blocked seven shots against Miami (OH) and was given the nickname "Swat" for his ability to block shots.

Stevenson's career-highs include 18 points, 14 rebounds, 7 blocks, 5 steals and 2 assists, respectively (all achieved during his sophomore season). Stevenson saw more playing time after Wildcat star freshman Patrick Patterson suffered an ankle injury before the rematch with Tennessee. Stevenson picked up three of those career highs during that period of time. His sophomore season, he averaged 5.9 points per game and 5.1 rebounds per game. Stevenson moved into the starting rotation for the Kentucky Wildcats after their trip to the 2008 NCAA Tournament. He ranks fifth on UK's all-time blocked shots list with 160.

He was a substitute teacher for Fayette County Public Schools in January 2013. On May 7, 2014, Trinity boys basketball coach Mike Szabo announced that Stevenson would join his staff. Stevenson joined the coaching staff at Missouri Western University in 2021.
