= L. J. Fort =

American football player (born 1990)

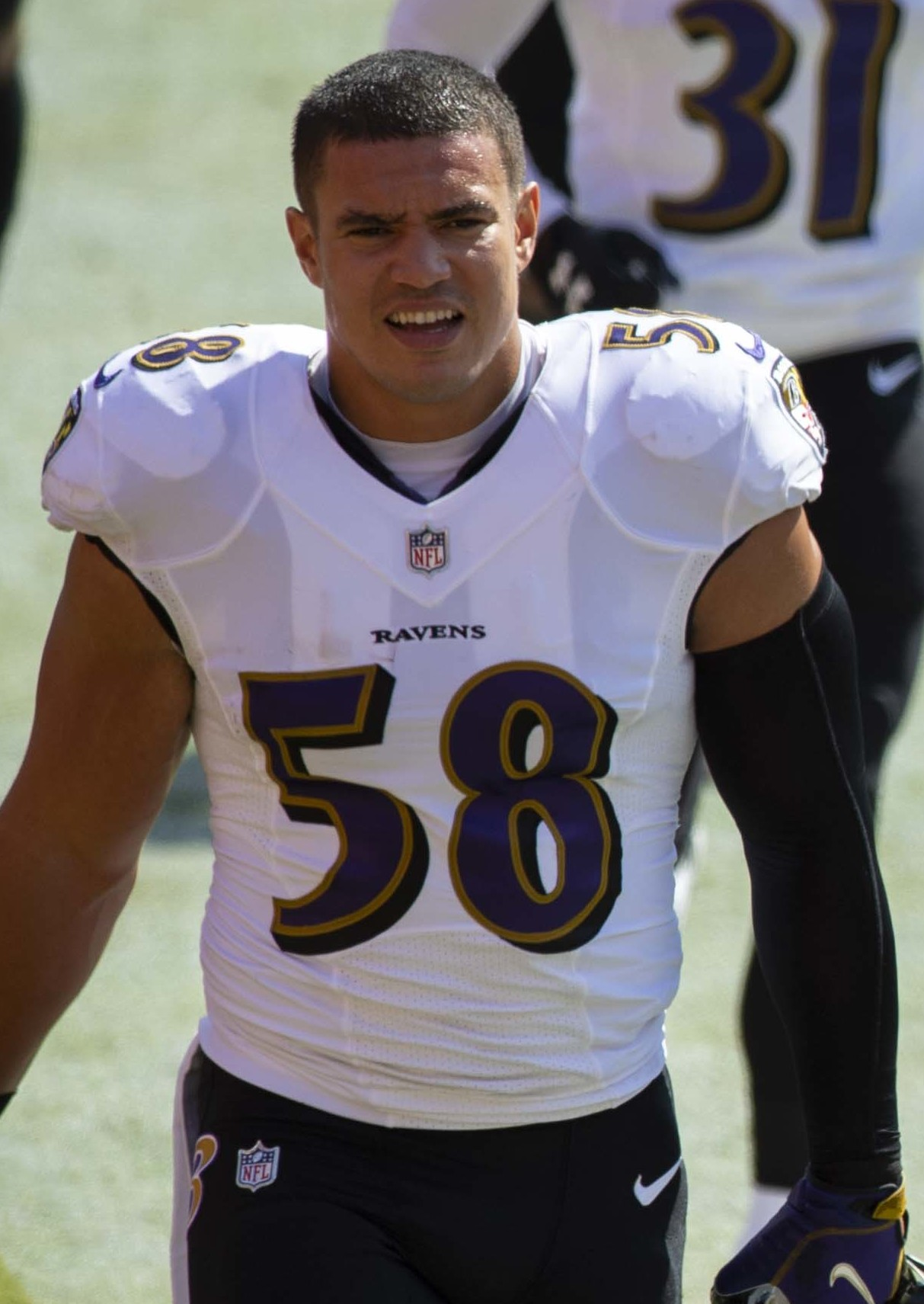
- Fort with the Baltimore Ravens in 2020

No. 58, 44, 54
- Position: Linebacker

Personal information
- Born: January 3, 1990 (age 36); Granite City, Illinois, U.S.
- Listed height: 6 ft 0 in (1.83 m)
- Listed weight: 232 lb (105 kg)

Career information
- High school: Waynesville (Waynesville, Missouri)
- College: Northern Iowa
- NFL draft: 2012: undrafted

Career history
- Cleveland Browns (2012); Denver Broncos (2013)*; Seattle Seahawks (2014); Cincinnati Bengals (2014–2015)*; New England Patriots (2015)*; Pittsburgh Steelers (2015–2018); Philadelphia Eagles (2019); Baltimore Ravens (2019–2021)
- * Offseason or practice squad member only

Career NFL statistics
- Total tackles: 173
- Sacks: 5
- Forced fumbles: 1
- Fumble recoveries: 3
- Interceptions: 1
- Defensive touchdowns: 2
- Stats at Pro Football Reference

Larry Fort Jr. (born January 3, 1990) is an American former professional football player who was a linebacker in the National Football League (NFL). He played college football for the Northern Iowa Panthers and was signed by the Cleveland Browns as an undrafted free agent in 2012.

Fort was also a member of the Denver Broncos, Seattle Seahawks, Cincinnati Bengals, New England Patriots, Pittsburgh Steelers, Philadelphia Eagles, and Baltimore Ravens.

== College career ==
Fort was a three-year starter at Northern Iowa as an outside linebacker. He was a second-team Missouri Valley Football Conference selection in 2010. The following season, Fort was named the Missouri Valley Football Conference's Defensive Player of the Year and was named a finalist for the NCAA FCS National Defensive Player of the Year Award.

== Professional career ==
Pre-draft measurables
Height	Weight	40-yard dash	10-yard split	20-yard split	20-yard shuttle	Three-cone drill	Vertical jump	Broad jump	Bench press
6 ft 0 in (1.83 m)	228 lb (103 kg)	4.67 s	1.58 s	2.58 s	4.35 s	7.15 s	38 in (0.97 m)	9 ft 11 in (3.02 m)	24 reps
All values from Northern Iowa's Pro Day

=== Cleveland Browns ===
Fort signed with the Cleveland Browns as an undrafted free agent and made the 53-man roster for the 2012 regular season opener.

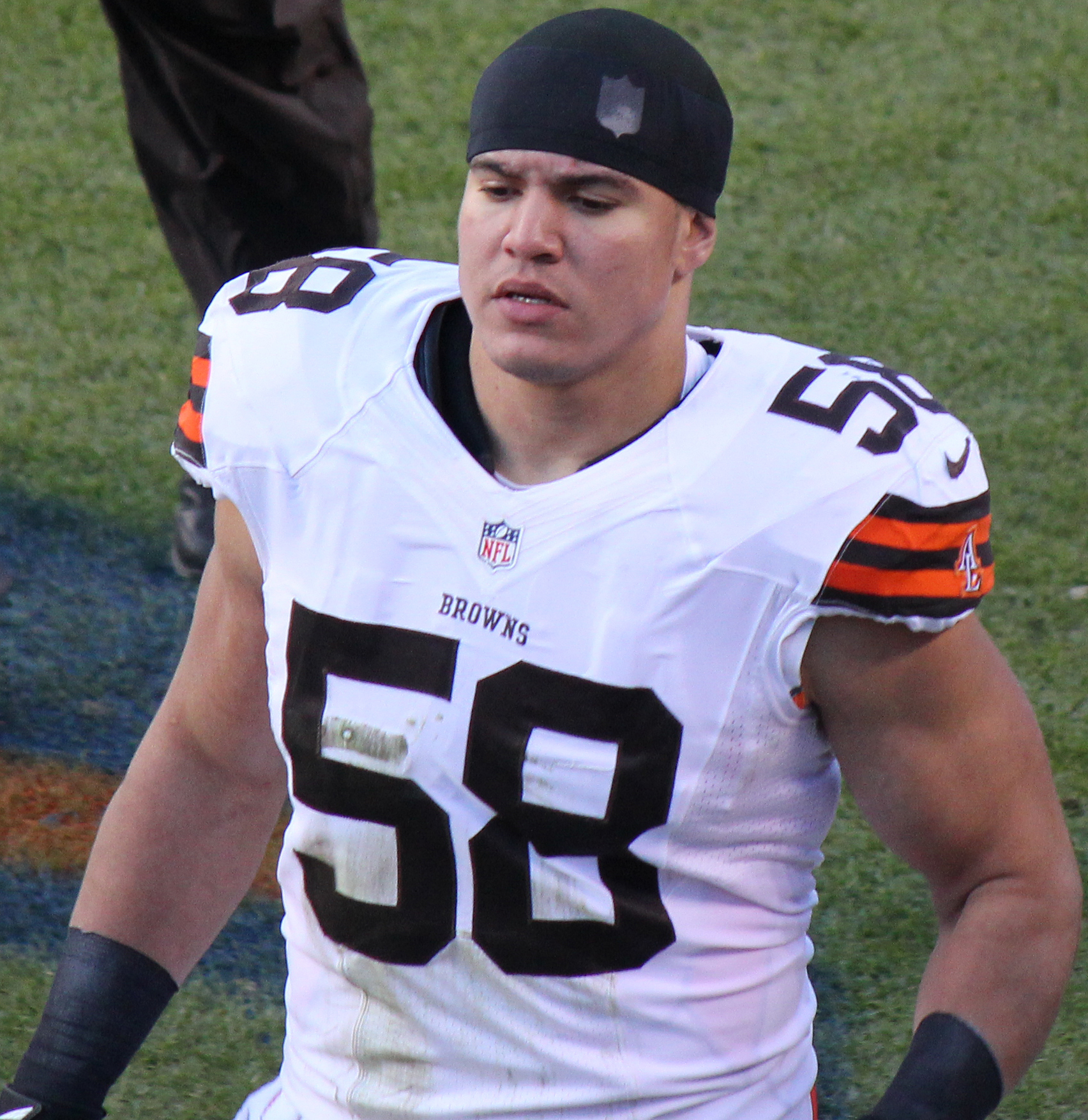
Fort with the Browns in 2012

Fort started for the Browns in Week 1 due to injuries to Chris Gocong, James-Michael Johnson, and Emmanuel Acho. He had his first career interception against the Philadelphia Eagles in that game, picking off Eagles' quarterback Michael Vick.

Fort played in all 16 regular season games for the Browns, finishing his rookie season with 20 tackles, 1 sack, and 1 interception.

=== Denver Broncos ===
Fort signed a future reserve contract with the Denver Broncos on December 31, 2013. He was released by the Broncos on August 29, 2014.

=== Seattle Seahawks ===
On October 22, 2014, Fort was signed to the Seattle Seahawks practice squad. Fort signed with the team as a fullback. He was activated for one regular season game in 2014.

=== Cincinnati Bengals ===
On November 26, 2014, Fort was signed to the Bengals' practice squad. He was released on April 29, 2015.

=== New England Patriots ===
On August 4, 2015, Fort signed with the New England Patriots. Fort was released on August 18, 2015.

=== Pittsburgh Steelers ===
On August 19, 2015, Fort signed with the Pittsburgh Steelers. Fort was released on September 5 and was re-signed to the practice squad the following day. He was promoted to the active roster on December 28 to replace injured fullback Roosevelt Nix for the team's final game.

Fort was released by the Steelers on November 12, 2016, but was re-signed three days later.

On September 12, 2017, Fort was waived by the Steelers and was re-signed to the practice squad the next day. He was promoted to the active roster on September 23, 2017.

=== Philadelphia Eagles ===
On March 14, 2019, Fort signed a three-year $5.5 million contract with the Philadelphia Eagles. He was released on September 27, 2019, after four games.

=== Baltimore Ravens ===
On September 30, 2019, Fort was signed by the Baltimore Ravens. On October 13, against the Cincinnati Bengals, Fort made his first start as a Raven, registering 2 tackles and a pass defense. During the Ravens 30–16 win over the Seattle Seahawks, Fort registered six tackles, including two for loss, a quarterback hit and his first quarterback sack as a Raven. On November 8, 2019, he signed a two-year, $5.5 million contract extension with the Ravens after becoming the starter due to injury. On December 8, 2019, Fort sacked Buffalo Bills quarterback Josh Allen on a crucial third down late in the fourth quarter.

In Week 1 of the 2020 season against the Cleveland Browns, Fort forced a fumble on punter Jamie Gillan and later recovered a fumble lost by running back Nick Chubb during the 38–6 win. In Week 2, against the Houston Texans, he had a 22-yard fumble return for a touchdown in the 33–16 victory. He was placed on the reserve/COVID-19 list by the team on November 3, 2020, and activated four days later.

At the start of the 2021 new league year, Baltimore chose not to pick up Fort's option for 2021, allowing him to become a free agent. He re-signed with the team on a one-year contract on April 2, 2021. In 2021, Fort changed his jersey number from #58 to #3 following the relaxation of the NFL's jersey number rules.

In the second quarter of the Week 2 preseason game against the Carolina Panthers, Fort tore his ACL, prematurely ending his season. He was placed on injured reserve on August 23, 2021.

=== NFL career statistics ===
Year	Team	Games		Tackles					Interceptions					Fumbles			
Year	Team	G	GS	Comb	Solo	Ast	Sack	Sfty	Int	Yds	Lng	TD	PD	FF	FR	Yds	TD
2012	CLE	16	16	20	11	7	1.0	0	1	10	10	0	3	0	0	0	0
2014	CIN	1	1	0	0	0	0.0	0	0	0	0	0	0	0	0	0	0
2016	PIT	14	14	4	3	1	0.0	0	0	0	0	0	0	0	0	0	0
2017	PIT	15	15	11	8	2	1.0	0	0	0	0	0	0	0	0	0	0
2018	PIT	15	15	48	30	10	1.0	0	0	0	0	0	0	0	0	0	0
2019	BAL	16	16	35	19	15	2.0	0	0	0	0	0	0	0	0	0	0
2020	BAL	14	14	53	30	21	0.0	0	0	0	0	0	0	0	0	0	0
Career		91	91	171	90	56	5.0	0	1	10	10	0	3	0	0	0	0
