= John Hughes (American football) =

American football player (born 1988)

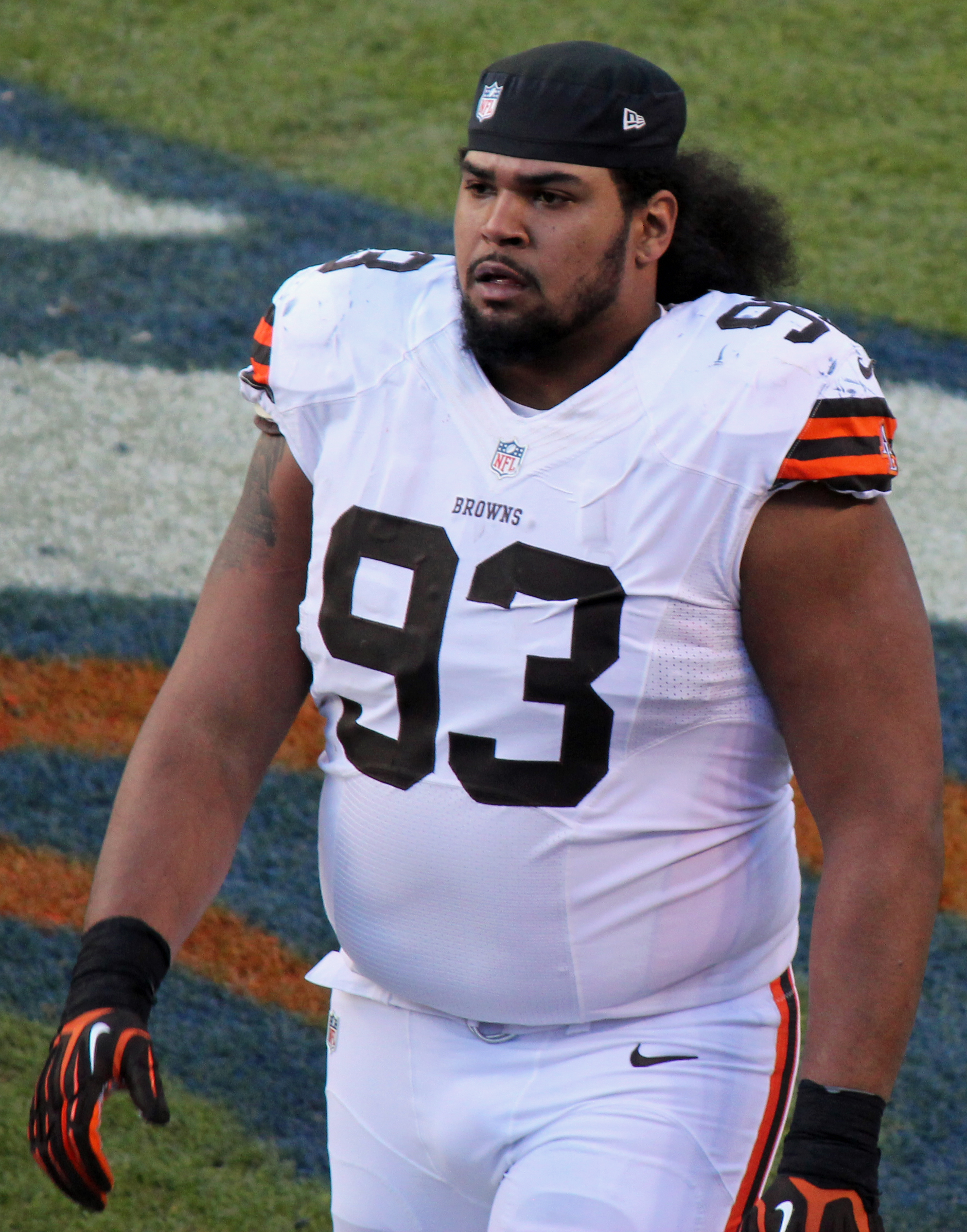
- Hughes with the Cleveland Browns in 2012

No. 93, 67, 92
- Position: Defensive tackle

Personal information
- Born: April 27, 1988 (age 38); Gahanna, Ohio, U.S.
- Listed height: 6 ft 2 in (1.88 m)
- Listed weight: 320 lb (145 kg)

Career information
- High school: Lincoln (Gahanna)
- College: Cincinnati
- NFL draft: 2012: 3rd round, 87th overall pick

Career history
- Cleveland Browns (2012–2016); New England Patriots (2016); Tampa Bay Buccaneers (2016); New Orleans Saints (2017); Buffalo Bills (2018)*
- * Offseason or practice squad member only

Career NFL statistics
- Total tackles: 125
- Sacks: 5.5
- Forced fumbles: 1
- Fumble recoveries: 2
- Stats at Pro Football Reference

John Lewis Hughes III (born April 27, 1988) is an American former professional football player who was a defensive tackle in the National Football League (NFL). He was selected by the Cleveland Browns in the third round in the 2012 NFL draft. He played college football for the Cincinnati Bearcats.

== Early life ==
John Hughes attended Gahanna Lincoln High School in Gahanna, Ohio. Hughes played tight end at Gahanna Lincoln and was initially recruited by colleges as either a tight end or defensive end. A three-star prospect according to Rivals.com, Hughes accepted a scholarship from the University of Cincinnati. Hughes is the second player ever to be drafted in the NFL from Gahanna Lincoln. Robert James White was the first in 1953 to the Baltimore Colts.

== College career ==
Hughes accepted a scholarship from the University of Cincinnati, playing defensive tackle for the Bearcats. With his coaches acknowledging his rare combination of size, speed, and power, Hughes switched to defensive tackle upon his arrival at the University of Cincinnati. A four-year contributor and two-year starter for the Bearcats, Hughes became a disruptive force along the defensive line. In his senior season alone, Hughes recorded 12.5 tackles for loss and 5 quarterback sacks. Upon completing his collegiate career, Hughes was awarded the Ray Sheakley Most Improved Leader Award as well as the John Pease Outstanding Lineman Award.

== Professional career ==
=== Cleveland Browns ===
Hughes was invited to the 2012 NFL Combine upon completion of his impressive collegiate career. Hampered by a hamstring injury, Hughes had limited participation at the Combine.

Hughes was selected 87th overall by the Cleveland Browns in the third round of the 2012 NFL draft. Hughes earned his first professional sack against the Cincinnati Bengals on September 16, 2012.

On March 13, 2015, Hughes signed a four-year, $14.4 million contract extension.

On September 20, 2016, Hughes was released by the Browns.

=== New England Patriots ===
On September 27, 2016, Hughes was signed by the New England Patriots. He was released on October 1, 2016.

=== Tampa Bay Buccaneers ===
On October 3, 2016, Hughes was signed by the Tampa Bay Buccaneers He was released on December 10, 2016 but was re-signed three days later.

=== New Orleans Saints ===
On August 12, 2017, Hughes was signed by the New Orleans Saints. He was released on September 2, 2017. He was re-signed on October 4. He was released by the Saints on November 6 and re-signed on November 8, 2017. He was placed on injured reserve on December 27, 2017 after suffering a torn biceps in Week 16.

=== Buffalo Bills ===
On July 26, 2018, Hughes signed a one-year contract with the Buffalo Bills. Hughes was released by the Bills on August 12, 2018.

== NFL career statistics ==
Legend
**Bold**	Career high

Year	Team	Games		Tackles					Interceptions					Fumbles			
Year	Team	GP	GS	Cmb	Solo	Ast	Sck	TFL	Int	Yds	TD	Lng	PD	FF	FR	Yds	TD
2012	CLE	**16**	2	**34**	**18**	16	**3.0**	**4**	0	0	0	0	1	0	0	0	0
2013	CLE	15	2	**34**	15	**19**	1.0	2	0	0	0	0	**2**	0	**1**	0	0
2014	CLE	5	**3**	17	7	10	0.0	0	0	0	0	0	1	0	0	0	0
2015	CLE	**16**	**3**	24	12	12	1.5	2	0	0	0	0	0	**1**	**1**	0	0
2016	CLE	1	0	0	0	0	0.0	0	0	0	0	0	0	0	0	0	0
2016	TAM	5	0	6	5	1	0.0	0	0	0	0	0	0	0	0	0	0
2017	NOR	8	0	10	4	6	0.0	0	0	0	0	0	0	0	0	0	0
Career		66	10	125	61	64	5.5	8	0	0	0	0	4	1	2	0	0
