= Northside High School (Lafayette, Louisiana) =

Location
- 301 Dunand Street; Lafayette, Louisiana 70501; United States

Information
- Type: Public
- School district: Lafayette Parish School System
- Principal: James Rollins
- Staff: 46.68 (FTE)
- Grades: 9 to 12
- Enrollment: 727 (2023-2024)
- Student to teacher ratio: 15.57
- Colors: Red, black, & white
- Mascot: Viking
- Nickname: Mighty Vikings
- Yearbook: Thor
- Website: Northside

Northside High School is located in the North part of the city of Lafayette, Louisiana, United States; hence "Northside".

== Demographics ==
The student body is predominantly African American (~92%–94%), with small populations of Hispanic (~3%–4%), White (~2%–3%) students and ~1% other/two or more races.

== Athletics ==
Northside High athletics competes in the LHSAA.

=== Championships ===
Football
The football team was state runner up in 2005 and 6-4A district champions in 2009 and 2010.

Basketball
The boys' basketball team won the 4A State Championship in 2006.

Track and Field
The girls' track and field team have won three back to back to back 6-4A State Championships from 2008 to 2010, and the boys' team won two back to back state championships in 2009 and 2010.

Wrestling
The wrestling team won the 4A State Championship in 2006.

== Notable alumni ==
- Bryson Bernard, the creator of the Hit Song “Cupid Shuffle”
- Adam Bob, former NFL linebacker
- Daniel Cormier, former UFC Light Heavyweight and Heavyweight Champion and Olympian in freestyle wrestling
- Ron Guidry, former MLB pitcher
- Dustin Poirier, professional mixed martial artist, former UFC Interim Lightweight Champion
- Perry Stevenson, American high school basketball coach and former basketball player, currently an assistant coach at Missouri Western University
- Jarrod Shaw, former NFL offensive lineman
- Keiland Williams, former NFL running back

== The School of Choice Program ==
Northside is a participating school which offers the law studies program which includes a mock trial room. The NHS Law Signature programs consist of law 1 (street law), law 2 (criminal justice and mock trial activities), law 3 (paralegal studies, forensic psychology and mock trial activities) and speech/debate for the law student. Students participate in a regional mock trial competition and host a law week for Northside's social studies classes. During this week, the law students perform a mock trial and conduct activities for the students. The law students also participate in a field trip to Angola and tour the federal courthouse.

Northside is the site of the Engineering Academy, which invites students across the Lafayette area to come from their freshmen year to graduation. The Academy of Engineering has dual purposes. The main goal is to prepare students to be successful in a post-secondary field of study related to engineering or industrial technology. The second goal is to help students determine which specific engineering or industrial technology discipline most appeals to them as a possible career. Courses include engineering I and II, drafting I and II, general technology education and technology education computer applications.
