= Billy Winn (American football) =

American football player (born 1989)

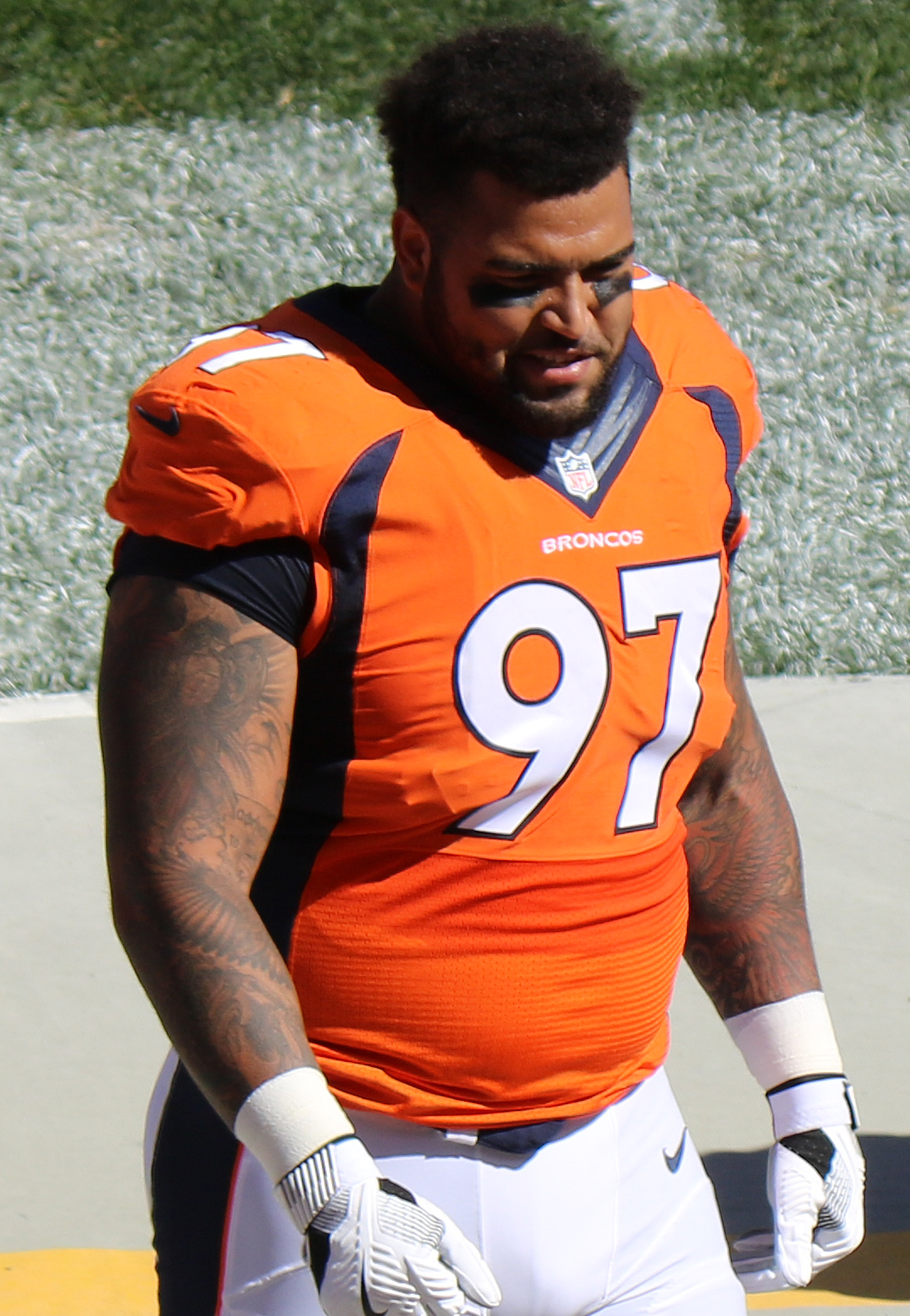
- Winn with the Denver Broncos in 2016

No. 90, 99, 97, 93
- Position: Defensive end

Personal information
- Born: April 15, 1989 (age 37); Las Vegas, Nevada, U.S.
- Listed height: 6 ft 4 in (1.93 m)
- Listed weight: 300 lb (136 kg)

Career information
- High school: Las Vegas
- College: Boise State (2007-2011)
- NFL draft: 2012: 6th round, 205th overall pick

Career history
- Cleveland Browns (2012–2015); Indianapolis Colts (2015); Denver Broncos (2016–2017, 2019); Green Bay Packers (2020)

Awards and highlights
- Third-team All-American (2010); Second-team All-MWC (2011)

Career NFL statistics
- Total tackles: 112
- Sacks: 3.0
- Forced fumbles: 2
- Fumble recoveries: 5
- Interceptions: 2
- Pass deflections: 7
- Stats at Pro Football Reference

William Jesse Winn Jr. (born April 15, 1989) is an American former professional football player who was a defensive end in the National Football League (NFL). He played college football for the Boise State Broncos. He was considered one of the best defensive tackle prospects for the 2012 NFL draft and was selected in the sixth round by the Cleveland Browns. He also played for the Indianapolis Colts, Denver Broncos and Green Bay Packers.

== Early life ==
Winn attended Las Vegas High School, graduating in 2007.

== College career ==
Winn attended Boise State University from 2007 to 2011. Where he recorded 133 tackles and 16 sacks.

== Professional career ==
Pre-draft measurables
Height	Weight	Arm length	Hand span	40-yard dash	10-yard split	20-yard split	20-yard shuttle	Three-cone drill	Vertical jump	Broad jump	Bench press
6 ft 3 3/4 in (1.92 m)	294 lb (133 kg)	32 1/2 in (0.83 m)	9 in (0.23 m)	4.84 s	1.72 s	2.88 s	4.44 s	7.37 s	27.0 in (0.69 m)	8 ft 11 in (2.72 m)	24 reps
All values from NFL Combine/Pro Day

=== Cleveland Browns ===
Winn was selected by the Cleveland Browns in the sixth round with the 205th overall pick of the 2012 NFL draft.

Winn had a strong rookie season with 26 tackles, one sack, and one interception.

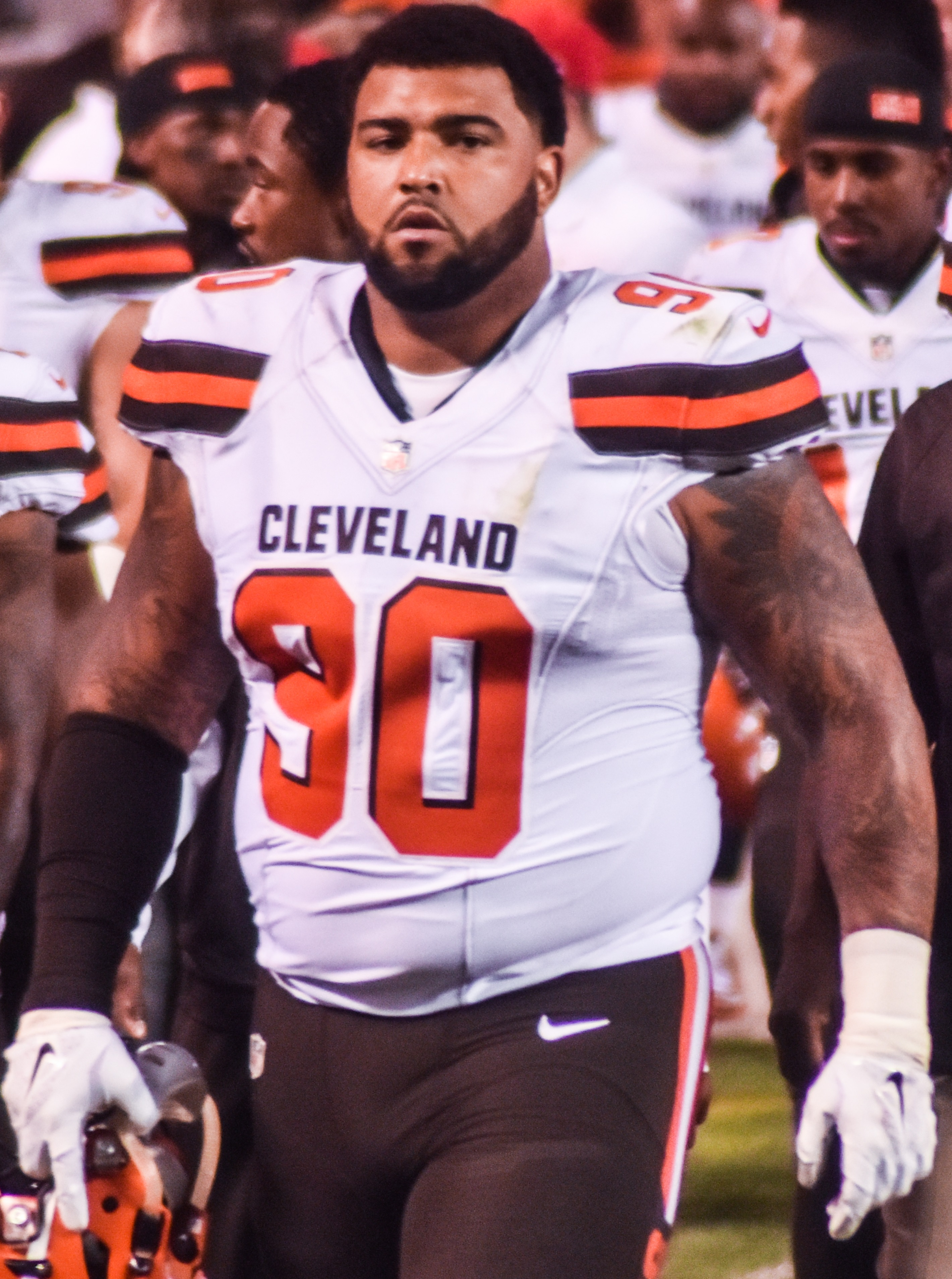
Winn with the Cleveland Browns in 2015

=== Indianapolis Colts ===
On September 11, 2015, Winn was traded to the Indianapolis Colts for a conditional 2017 draft pick. He was placed on season-ending injured reserve on December 21.

=== Denver Broncos ===
On July 31, 2016, Winn signed with the Denver Broncos. His free agent contract is for one-year and $760,000.

On May 3, 2017, Winn re-signed with the Broncos. He suffered a torn ACL in the Broncos first preseason game and was ruled out for the season.

On April 22, 2019, Winn re-signed with the Denver Broncos. He was placed on injured reserve on August 4, 2019, with a triceps injury. On March 5, 2020, Winn was released by the Broncos.

=== Green Bay Packers ===
On September 16, 2020, Winn was signed the Green Bay Packers' practice squad. He was elevated to the active roster on September 26 for the team's week 3 game against the New Orleans Saints, and reverted to the practice squad after the game. He was elevated again on October 5 for the week 4 game against the Atlanta Falcons, and reverted to the practice squad again following the game. He was promoted to the active roster on October 24. He was placed on injured reserve on December 9, 2020.

== NFL career statistics ==
=== Regular season ===
Year	Team	GP	GS	Tackles					Interceptions						Fumbles	
Year	Team	GP	GS	Total	Solo	Ast	Sck	SFTY	PDef	Int	Yds	Avg	Lng	TDs	FF	FR
2012	CLE	16	10	23	16	7	1.0	0	3	1	0	0	0	0	0	2
2013	CLE	11	3	19	16	3	2.0	0	0	0	0	0	0	0	1	0
2014	CLE	13	5	31	17	14	0	0	2	1	0	0	0	0	1	0
2015	IND	12	3	14	6	8	0	0	0	0	0	0	0	0	0	2
2016	DEN	16	2	19	8	11	0	0	0	0	0	0	0	0	0	1
2020	GB	6	0	6	2	4	0	0	2	0	0	0	0	0	0	0
Total		74	23	112	65	47	3	0	7	2	0	0	0	0	2	5
Source: NFL.com
