= Ryan Miller (offensive lineman) =

American football player (born 1989)

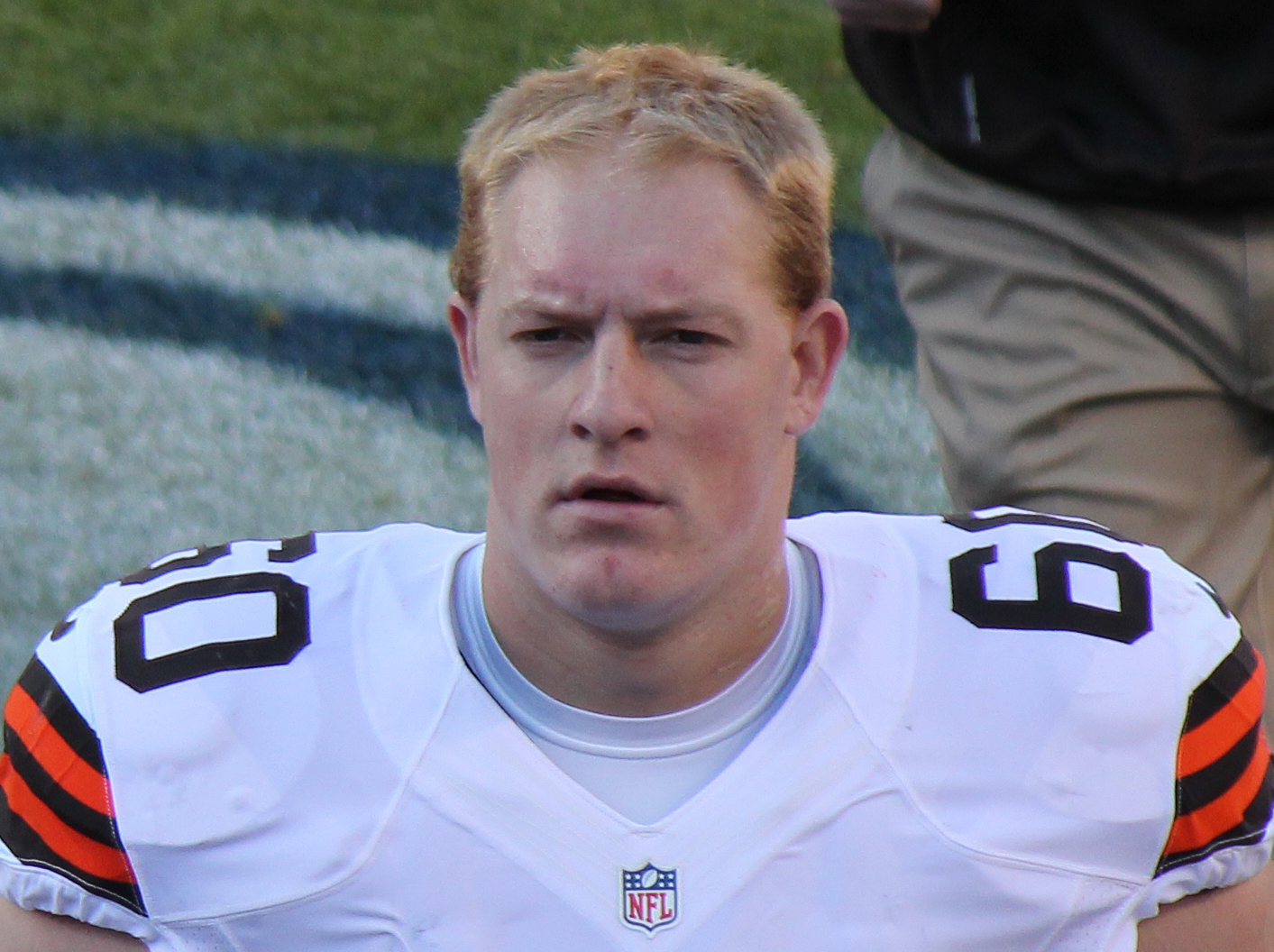
- Miller with the Cleveland Browns in 2012

No. 60
- Position: Offensive guard

Personal information
- Born: July 6, 1989 (age 37); Littleton, Colorado, U.S.
- Listed height: 6 ft 7 in (2.01 m)
- Listed weight: 320 lb (145 kg)

Career information
- High school: Columbine (Columbine, Colorado)
- College: Colorado
- NFL draft: 2012: 5th round, 160th overall pick

Career history
- Cleveland Browns (2012); Denver Broncos (2014)*; San Diego Chargers (2014); Dallas Cowboys (2015)
- * Offseason or practice squad member only

Awards and highlights
- Second-team All-American (2011); Freshman All-American (2007)

Career NFL statistics
- Games played: 8
- Stats at Pro Football Reference

Ryan Miller (born July 6, 1989) is an American former professional football player who was an offensive guard in the National Football League (NFL). He played college football for the Colorado Buffaloes. Miller was considered one of the best guards of his class.

== Early life ==
Miller attended Columbine High School in Littleton, Colorado, where he played offensive tackle and defensive end. He refused a starting position his sophomore year as playing varsity football was an overwhelming challenge. As a senior, he started all 14 games at offensive tackle, averaging well over 10 pancake blocks per game, did not allow a quarterback sacks, was flagged for just one penalty and had five direct touchdown blocks. On defense, he registered 31 tackles, 20 solo with 12 for losses including five sacks, with 10 hurries, four passes broken up, two fumble recoveries with one forced as a reserve. He was named Colorado's Gatorade Player of the Year, he earned a host of All-America honors for his senior season, including Parade, USA Today, SuperPrep, Rivals.com, PrepStar and MaxPreps. Miller was selected to play in the 2007 U. S. Army All-American Bowl in San Antonio, Texas, and he helped the West to a 24-7 win.

Regarded as a five-star recruit by Rivals.com, Miller was listed as the No. 2 offensive tackle prospect in the class of 2007, behind only Josh Oglesby. He picked Colorado over scholarship offers from Miami (Fl.), Nebraska, Notre Dame, Oklahoma, and USC.

== College career ==
In his true freshman year at the University of Colorado Boulder, Miller played in 10 games and started seven, including the 2007 Independence Bowl, at right offensive tackle. He became the first tackle to play as a true freshman at Colorado since Bryan Campbell, who played as a reserve behind Mark VanderPoel on the 1989 and 1990 teams, and when he started, that made him just the ninth true freshman to start a game on the offensive line at Colorado since freshmen were allowed to play again in 1972. Miller earned first-team Freshman All-America honors from The Sporting News, second-team by Scout.com, and third-team by College Football News. TSN also selected him first-team Freshman All-Big 12.

After starting the first four games of his sophomore season at right tackle, Miller went down with a broken fibula on the second play of the second half against Florida State in Jacksonville, Florida. He was granted a medical hardship after missing the bulk of the 2008 season due to injury, thus he picked up an extra year of eligibility. Miller returned to the field in 2009, and started all 12 games, seven at right guard where he opened the season, and five at right tackle when the line was shuffled for assorted reasons. His was a Walter Camp All American his senior year. He was also an Outland Trophy Candidate, given to the best lineman in college football.

== Professional career ==
Pre-draft measurables
| Height | Weight | Arm length | Hand span | Wingspan | 40-yard dash | 10-yard split | 20-yard split | 20-yard shuttle | Three-cone drill | Vertical jump | Broad jump | Bench press |
|---|---|---|---|---|---|---|---|---|---|---|---|---|
| 6 ft 7 1/4 in (2.01 m) | 321 lb (146 kg) | 33 1/8 in (0.84 m) | 9 1/2 in (0.24 m) | 6 ft 8 3/8 in (2.04 m) | 5.27 s | 1.86 s | 3.06 s | 4.78 s | 7.72 s | 28.0 in (0.71 m) | 8 ft 4 in (2.54 m) | 32 reps |
All values from NFL Combine

=== Cleveland Browns ===
Miller was selected in the fifth round with the 160th overall pick by the Cleveland Browns in the 2012 NFL Draft.

On July 27, 2013, Miller sustained a head injury during blocking drills at the Browns' indoor facility. He was taken by ambulance to the Cleveland Clinic where he was treated. He played in eight games as a rookie.

=== Denver Broncos ===
On December 31, 2013, Miller was signed to a future contract with Denver Broncos. He officially joined the Broncos' roster on March 11, 2014. He was later released from the practice squad on October 7, 2014.

=== San Diego Chargers ===
On November 12, 2014, he was signed by the San Diego Chargers to the practice squad, then to active roster. He suffered a torn groin and then a concussion after returning to the field. He was medically released on December 8, 2014.

=== Dallas Cowboys ===
On January 15, 2015, Miller was signed by the Dallas Cowboys to a future contract. On July 28, 2015, he was waived by the Cowboys. On the following day, he cleared waivers and was reverted to the Cowboys' injured reserve list. On September 15, 2015, he was released by the Cowboys with an injury settlement.
