= Jarrod Shaw =

American football player (born 1988)

74
- Position: Center

Personal information
- Born: January 7, 1988 (age 38); Lafayette, Louisiana, U.S.
- Listed height: 6 ft 3 in (1.91 m)
- Listed weight: 316 lb (143 kg)

Career information
- College: Tennessee
- NFL draft: 2011: undrafted

Career history
- Cleveland Browns (2011–2012); Oakland Raiders (2014)*
- * Offseason or practice squad member only
- Stats at Pro Football Reference

Jarrod Shaw (born January 7, 1988) is an American former football offensive guard. He signed with the Cleveland Browns as an undrafted free agent in 2011. He played college football at Tennessee.

== Early life ==
Shaw attended Northside High School in Lafayette, Louisiana. He was a Two-time All-District and All- State while in high school.

== College career ==
He played college football at Tennessee, where he started six games in his junior season and 13 games in his senior season. While at Tennessee, Shaw played all five positions along the offensive line during his career.

== Professional career ==
=== Cleveland Browns ===
On July 26, 2011, he signed with the Cleveland Browns as an undrafted free agent. On September 3, 2011, he was released. On September 4, he was signed to the practice squad. On January 3, 2012, he was signed to a reserve/future contract after spending the 2011 NFL season on the Cleveland Browns practice squad. On August 31, 2012, he was released. On September 1, he was signed to the practice squad. On October 22, 2012, he was promoted to the active roster. He was waived by the Cleveland Browns on September 1, 2013.

=== Oakland Raiders ===
Shaw was signed by the Oakland Raiders as a reserve/future free agent on January 13, 2014. On August 31, 2014, Shaw was released.
