= Kiante Tripp =

American gridiron football player (born 1987)

No. 67, 92
- Position: Defensive tackle

Personal information
- Born: October 7, 1987 (age 39); Atlanta, Georgia, U.S.
- Listed height: 6 ft 6 in (1.98 m)
- Listed weight: 276 lb (125 kg)

Career information
- High school: Westlake (Atlanta, Georgia)
- College: Georgia
- NFL draft: 2011: undrafted

Career history
- Atlanta Falcons (2011)*; Cleveland Browns (2011); Toronto Argonauts (2013); Hamilton Tiger-Cats (2014); Brooklyn Bolts (2014)
- * Offseason or practice squad member only

Awards and highlights
- 2014 FXFL All-Star

Career NFL statistics
- Total tackles: 1
- Stats at Pro Football Reference
- Stats at CFL.ca (archive)

Kiante Tripp (born October 7, 1987) is a former gridiron football defensive tackle. Tripp also played in the National Football League (NFL) for the Cleveland Browns in 2011. He played college football for the University of Georgia. Tripp is also a member of Omega Psi Phi fraternity.
