= Oniel Cousins =

American football player (born 1984)

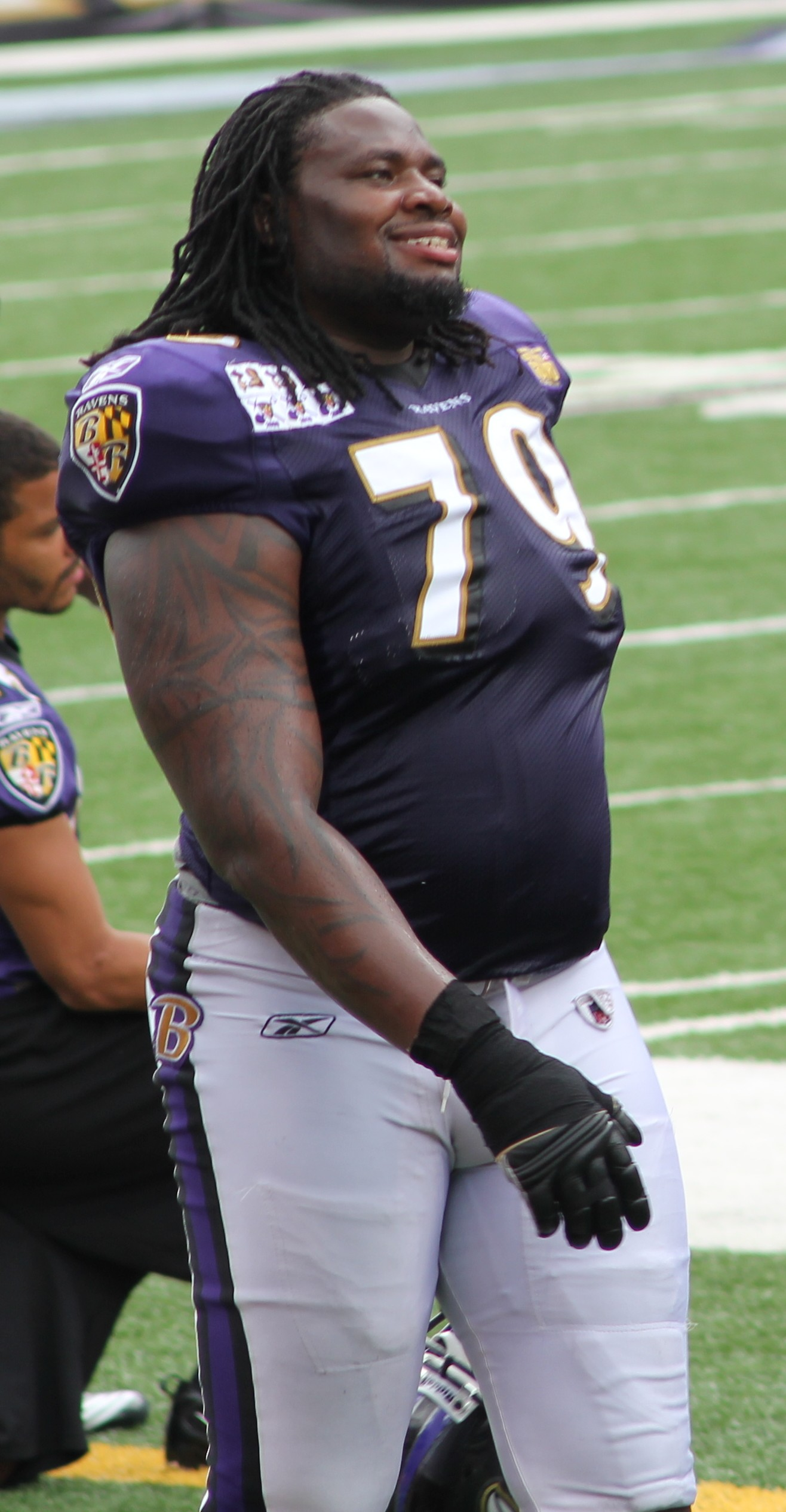
- Cousins at M&T Bank Stadium in 2011

No. 64, 72, 75
- Position: Guard

Personal information
- Born: June 29, 1984 (age 42); Jamaica
- Listed height: 6 ft 4 in (1.93 m)
- Listed weight: 315 lb (143 kg)

Career information
- High school: Eastside Christian (Fullerton, California, U.S.)
- College: Texas–El Paso
- NFL draft: 2008: 3rd round, 99th overall pick

Career history
- Baltimore Ravens (2008–2010); Cleveland Browns (2011–2013); Tampa Bay Buccaneers (2014)

Awards and highlights
- First-team All-Conference USA (2007)

Career NFL statistics
- Games played: 75
- Games started: 16
- Stats at Pro Football Reference

Oniel Theodore Cousins (born June 29, 1984) is a Jamaican-born former professional American football guard. He was selected by the Baltimore Ravens in the third round of the 2008 NFL draft. He played college football at Texas–El Paso. He also played for the Cleveland Browns and Tampa Bay Buccaneers.

== Professional career ==
=== Baltimore Ravens ===
Cousins was selected by the Baltimore Ravens as a guard in the third round of the 2008 NFL draft. During his time in Baltimore, Cousins was a backup at the position, seeing some starting time due to injuries.

On August 27, 2011, he was waived by the Ravens.

=== Cleveland Browns ===
He was claimed off waivers by the Cleveland Browns on August 29, 2011. He had one start in 2011, 0 in 2012, but was the starting right guard on opening day in 2013. He has started 4 games in the current season.

=== Tampa Bay Buccaneers ===
Cousins signed with the Tampa Bay Buccaneers on March 16, 2014, to a one-year contract. His debut season with Tampa did not go well as he was a part of an offensive line that gave up the most sacks in the league. He became an unrestricted free agent after the 2014 season.
