= Brad Smelley =

American football player (born 1989)

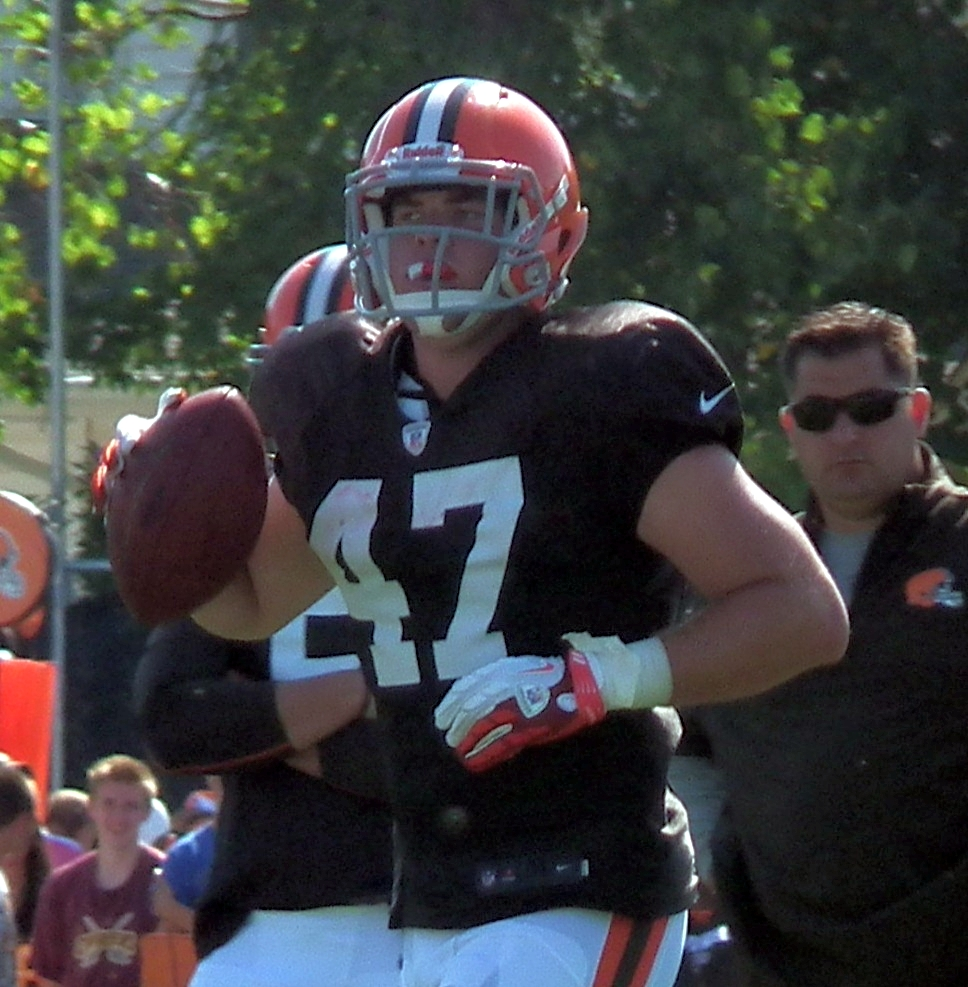
- Smelley with the Cleveland Browns in 2012

No. 47
- Position: Tight end

Personal information
- Born: April 20, 1989 (age 37); Tuscaloosa, Alabama, U.S.
- Listed height: 6 ft 2 in (1.88 m)
- Listed weight: 235 lb (107 kg)

Career information
- High school: Tuscaloosa (AL) American Christian
- College: Alabama
- NFL draft: 2012: 7th round, 247th overall pick

Career history
- Cleveland Browns (2012); St. Louis Rams (2013)*; Houston Texans (2013); St. Louis Rams (2014–2015)*
- * Offseason or practice squad member only

Awards and highlights
- 2× BCS national champion (2009, 2011)

Career NFL statistics
- Receptions: 1
- Receiving yards: 3
- Stats at Pro Football Reference

Brad Smelley (born April 20, 1989) is an American retired professional football tight end. He was selected by the Cleveland Browns in the seventh round of the 2012 NFL draft. He played college football at the University of Alabama. He was also a member of the Houston Texans and St. Louis Rams.

== College career ==
He played college football at Alabama, where he started at tight end and won two NCAA National Championships. In his career, he had 54 receptions for 559 yards and four touchdowns.

== Professional career ==
=== Cleveland Browns ===
Smelley was selected by the Cleveland Browns in the seventh round, 247th overall in the 2012 NFL draft. Brad was let go from the Cleveland Browns on August 31, 2012, and signed to the practice squad. On December 10, 2012, Smelley was signed to the Cleveland Browns active roster. On September 1, 2013, Smelley was cut by the Cleveland Browns and became a free agent.

=== St. Louis Rams (first stint) ===
Smelley was signed to the St. Louis Rams practice squad in November, but was released three days later in favor of Justice Cunningham.

=== Houston Texans ===
On December 3, 2013, Smelley signed with the practice squad of the Houston Texans. The Texans promoted him to the active roster on December 13 but was later released by the team.

=== St. Louis Rams (second stint) ===
Smelley was signed by the St. Louis Rams on August 11, 2014, to fill the void left by Mason Brodine after he was placed on injured reserve. He was released during final cuts on August 29, 2014. He was signed to the Rams practice squad on September 3, 2014.

On January 6, 2015, Smelley signed a futures deal with the Rams.
