= Reggie Hodges =

American football player (born 1982)

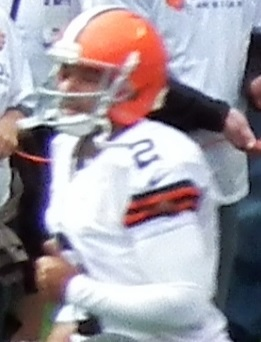
- Hodges with the Cleveland Browns in 2012

No. 4, 6, 3, 2
- Position: Punter

Personal information
- Born: January 26, 1982 (age 44); Champaign, Illinois, U.S.
- Listed height: 6 ft 0 in (1.83 m)
- Listed weight: 226 lb (103 kg)

Career information
- High school: Champaign Centennial
- College: Ball State (2000–2004)
- NFL draft: 2005: 6th round, 210th overall pick

Career history
- St. Louis Rams (2005); Philadelphia Eagles (2005); Indianapolis Colts (2006−2007)*; Seattle Seahawks (2008)*; New England Patriots (2008)*; New York Jets (2008); Tennessee Titans (2009); Cleveland Browns (2009−2012)
- * Offseason or practice squad member only

Awards and highlights
- First-team All-MAC (2004); NFL record: Longest run by a punter: 68 yards

Career NFL statistics
- Punts: 320
- Punt yards: 13,266
- Punt yard average: 41.5
- Long: 61
- Stats at Pro Football Reference

Reginald Aaron Hodges (born January 26, 1982) is an American former professional football player who was a punter in the National Football League (NFL). He was selected by the St. Louis Rams in the sixth round of the 2005 NFL draft. He played college football for the Ball State Cardinals.

Hodges was also a member of the Philadelphia Eagles, Indianapolis Colts, Seattle Seahawks, New England Patriots, New York Jets, Tennessee Titans, and Cleveland Browns.

== Early life ==
Hodges earned First-team All-state honors in Illinois as a senior at Champaign Centennial High School, averaging 39.4 yards per punt.

== College career ==
Hodges took over punting duties as a freshman at Ball State University, going on to set a school-career record with 254 attempts. His 10,210 yards ranked second in school history at the time of his graduation. He was named First-team All-MAC selection as a senior, leading conference with 73 punts (42.6 avg).

== Professional career ==
=== St. Louis Rams ===
The St. Louis Rams selected Hodges in the sixth round (210th overall) of the 2005 NFL draft. He was signed to a three-year contract on July 27, 2005. Hodges won the Rams' punting job out of training camp, beating out veteran Bryan Barker. Hodges went on to appear in five games for the Rams, averaging 38.0 yards and 31.0 net yards in 22 attempts. Hodges' poor performance caused the team to release him on October 10 and re-sign Barker for the remainder of the season.

=== Philadelphia Eagles ===
On November 2, 2005, Philadelphia Eagles head coach Andy Reid said the team would sign Hodges to replace Dirk Johnson, who was out with a hernia. Hodges appeared in three games for the Eagles, averaging 36.8 yards in 19 punts with one blocked. He was waived by the team November 22. He spent the rest of the 2005 season out of football.

The Eagles re-signed Hodges to a two-year future contract on January 13, 2006. The deal included base salaries of $310,000 (2006) and $385,000 (2007). However, he did not play in the team's first preseason game and was waived on August 8.

=== Indianapolis Colts ===
On August 18, 2006, the Indianapolis Colts signed Hodges, however he failed to beat out longtime Colts punter Hunter Smith for the job and was released on September 3. He spent the 2006 season out of football.

The Colts re-signed Hodges to a three-year contract on February 23, 2007. He again lost out to Smith for the Colts' punting job, failing to appear in the team's first two preseason games before being released on August 23. He spent the season out of football.

=== Seattle Seahawks ===
After failing to make an NFL team for each of the past two seasons, Hodges signed with the Seattle Seahawks on April 11, 2008. He was released by the team on August 30 during final cuts.

=== New England Patriots ===
On September 4, 2008, Hodges was signed to the practice squad of the New England Patriots. He was waived from it on September 7, 2008.

=== New York Jets ===
On September 17, 2008, Hodges was signed by the Jets to replace former punter Ben Graham, who was cut the day before. The Jets waived Hodges on April 27, 2009, and he was replaced by Eric Wilbur. He was re-signed on June 10, 2009.

=== Tennessee Titans ===
On September 23, 2009, Hodges was signed by the Tennessee Titans to replace punter Craig Hentrich. He was waived on October 27.

=== Cleveland Browns ===
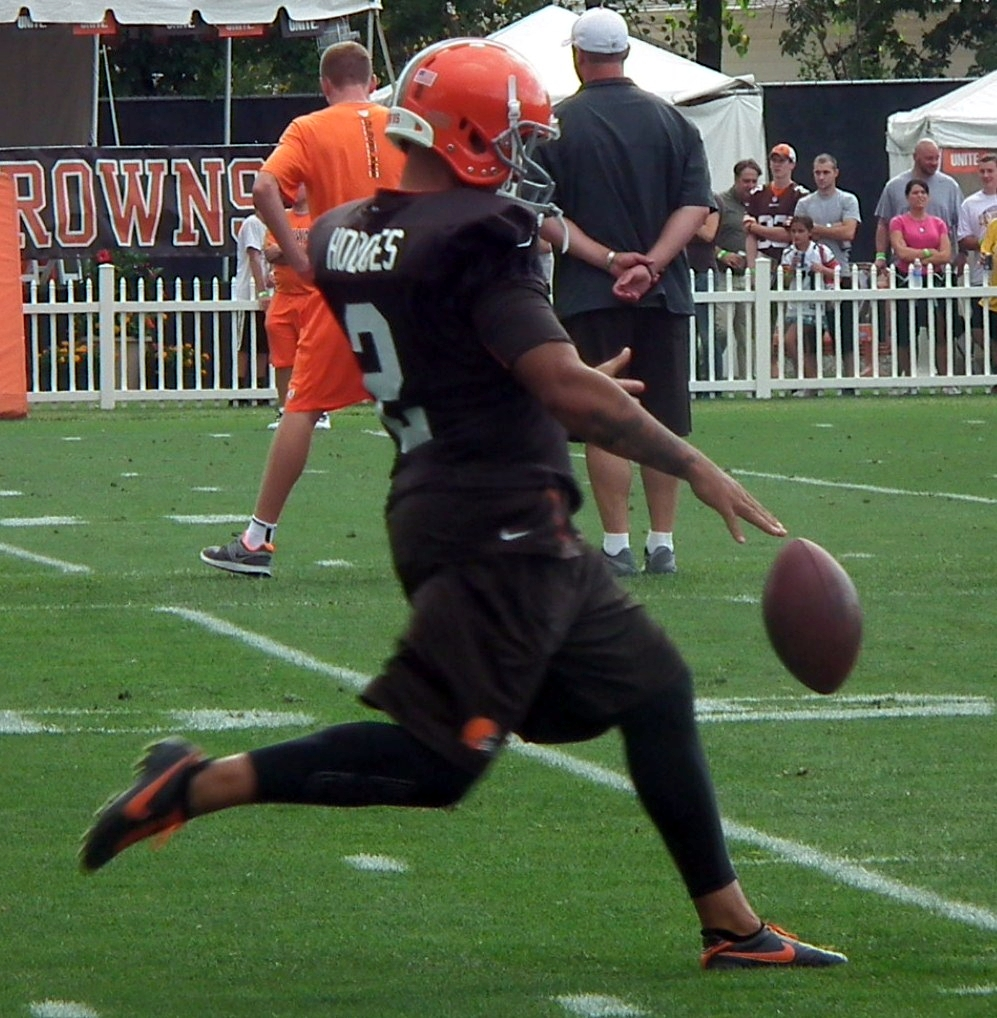
Hodges in Browns training camp in 2012

Hodges was signed by the Cleveland Browns on November 15, 2009, after punter Dave Zastudil was listed as inactive for the game against the Baltimore Ravens. Zastudil was later placed on injured reserve on November 18, making Hodges the only punter on the roster. Zastudil was again placed on injured reserve on August 17, 2010, after the knee recovered poorly from surgery.

During the Browns' October 24, 2010, game against the New Orleans Saints, Hodges took a fake punt and ran it 68 yards to the Saints' 10-yard line. This run is currently the longest run by a punter in NFL history, and the longest by a member of the Browns in 2010.

On November 27, 2010, Hodges signed a 2-year deal, keeping him with the Browns through 2012.

On August 2, 2011, while practicing at the team's training facility in Berea, Ohio, Hodges suffered a torn left Achilles tendon, falling to the ground as soon as he planted his non-kicking foot in the end zone during a special teams drill. He was immediately ruled out for the season and placed on injured reserve.

== Personal life ==
Hodges has the distinction of being one of the few African-American punters in NFL history. He is also the Vice President of Fuzion Sports.
