= Ishmaa'ily Kitchen =

American football player (born 1988)

No. 67, 70
- Position: Nose tackle

Personal information
- Born: August 24, 1988 (age 38); Youngstown, Ohio, U.S.
- Listed height: 6 ft 1 in (1.85 m)
- Listed weight: 334 lb (151 kg)

Career information
- High school: Cardinal Mooney (Youngstown)
- College: Kent State
- NFL draft: 2012: undrafted

Career history
- Baltimore Ravens (2012)*; Cleveland Browns (2012–2014); Detroit Lions (2015); New England Patriots (2015); Tampa Bay Buccaneers (2016)*
- * Offseason or practice squad member only

Career NFL statistics
- Total tackles: 78
- Stats at Pro Football Reference

Ishmaa'ily "Ish" Yuwsha Kitchen (/ˌɪʃmeɪˈɑːli/ ISH-may-AH-lee; born August 24, 1988) is an American former professional football player who was a nose tackle in the National Football League (NFL). He was signed by the Baltimore Ravens as an undrafted free agent in 2012. He played college football for the Kent State Golden Flashes. Kitchen was also a member of the Cleveland Browns, Detroit Lions, New England Patriots, and Tampa Bay Buccaneers.

== College career ==
Kitchen played at Kent State University for the Golden Flashes. In his senior year, he started 6 games at the nose tackle position. In his junior year, he played in all 12 games in which he recorded 22 tackles for the season. In his sophomore year, he played in 12 games.

== Professional career ==
=== Baltimore Ravens ===
He signed with the Baltimore Ravens as an undrafted free agent. On August 31, 2012, he was released.

=== Cleveland Browns ===
On September 1, 2012, he was claimed off waivers by the Cleveland Browns. During the 2014-2015 season Kitchen came out with a new sack dance called the "Kitchen Slam." During this celebration Kitchen acted like he was stirring a pot of dough in the kitchen and then slammed it onto the ground. His sack dance caught on and was later voted the best sack dance in the NFL. Kitchen was released by the Browns on September 1, 2015.

=== Detroit Lions ===
On October 8, 2015, Kitchen signed with the Detroit Lions. He was later released on October 23, 2015.

=== New England Patriots ===
On December 16, 2015, Kitchen was signed to the active roster of the New England Patriots. He was cut on December 22, 2015 to make room on the roster for Steven Jackson. The Patriots re-signed Kitchen to their 53-man roster on December 30, 2015.

The Patriots released Kitchen on April 15, 2016.

=== Tampa Bay Buccaneers ===
On August 15, 2016, Kitchen was signed by the Buccaneers. On August 28, 2016, Kitchen was waived by the Buccaneers.

== In popular culture ==
In 2015, Kitchen appeared in the Key & Peele skit 'East-West Bowl 3', a Comedy Central Super Bowl special which featured NFL players with unusual names.
