= Emmanuel Stephens =

American football player (born 1987)

No. 96
- Position: Defensive end

Personal information
- Born: February 17, 1987 (age 39); Houston, Texas, U.S.
- Listed height: 6 ft 3 in (1.91 m)
- Listed weight: 250 lb (113 kg)

Career information
- High school: Waltrip
- College: Ole Miss
- NFL draft: 2010: undrafted

Career history
- Atlanta Falcons (2010–2011)*; Cleveland Browns (2011–2012)
- * Offseason or practice squad member only

Career NFL statistics
- Total tackles: 26
- Sacks: 1
- Forced fumbles: 1
- Stats at Pro Football Reference

Emmanuel Lavar Stephens (born February 17, 1987) is an American former professional football player who was a defensive end in the National Football League (NFL). He played college football for the Ole Miss Rebels and was signed by the Atlanta Falcons as an undrafted free agent in 2010.

== College career ==
Stephens started his college football career at two-year community college Blinn College in Brenham, Texas, where he played in 2006 and 2007. While at Blinn, he was selected to the 2007 All-America first-team by the National Junior College Athletic Association. Stephens went on to enroll at the University of Mississippi where he played for the Ole Miss Rebels in 2008 and 2009.

== Professional career ==
=== Atlanta Falcons ===
After going undrafted in the 2010 NFL draft, Stephens signed with the Atlanta Falcons on April 26, 2010. He was released on September 4 and signed to the Falcons' practice squad the next day. Stephens spent the entire season on the practice squad and was re-signed to a reserve/future contract on January 18, 2011. The Falcons waived him during final cuts on September 3.

=== Cleveland Browns ===
Stephens was claimed off waivers by the Cleveland Browns on September 4, and was eventually moved into a starting role for the team that season.
