= Christian Yount =

American football player (born 1988)

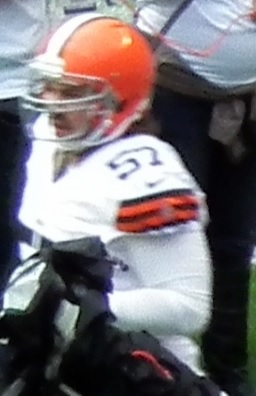
- Yount with the Cleveland Browns in 2012

No. 46, 57
- Position: Long snapper

Personal information
- Born: July 8, 1988 (age 38); San Pedro, California, U.S.
- Listed height: 6 ft 1 in (1.85 m)
- Listed weight: 256 lb (116 kg)

Career information
- High school: Las Flores (CA) Tesoro
- College: UCLA
- NFL draft: 2011: undrafted

Career history
- Tampa Bay Buccaneers (2011); Cleveland Browns (2011–2014); New England Patriots (2016)*
- * Offseason or practice squad member only

Career NFL statistics
- Games played: 60
- Total tackles: 10
- Stats at Pro Football Reference

Christian Alexander Yount (born July 8, 1988) is an American former professional football player who was a long snapper in the National Football League (NFL). He played college football for the UCLA Bruins. Yount was signed by the Tampa Bay Buccaneers as an undrafted free agent in 2011 and has also played for the Cleveland Browns.

== Professional career ==
=== Tampa Bay Buccaneers ===
After going unselected in the 2011 NFL draft, Yount signed with the Tampa Bay Buccaneers. Originally, he made the roster out of training camp, but was released by the team on September 14, only to be re-signed on September 17. He was waived again on October 25.

=== Cleveland Browns ===
On November 29, 2011, Yount signed with the Cleveland Browns.

On August 6, 2013, Yount signed a five-year contract extension. On May 29, 2015, Yount was waived.

=== New England Patriots ===
On April 22, 2016, Yount signed with the New England Patriots. Yount was released on July 21, 2016.
