= Brian Sanford =

American football player (born 1987)

No. 70, 75, 91
- Position: Defensive end

Personal information
- Born: September 12, 1987 (age 39); Hartford, Connecticut, U.S.
- Listed height: 6 ft 2 in (1.88 m)
- Listed weight: 280 lb (127 kg)

Career information
- High school: Hartford Public
- College: Temple
- NFL draft: 2010: undrafted

Career history
- Cleveland Browns (2010–2012); Oakland Raiders (2013); Cleveland Browns (2013); Denver Broncos (2014)*
- * Offseason or practice squad member only

Awards and highlights
- Mark Bresani Award (2008)

Career NFL statistics
- Total tackles: 13
- Stats at Pro Football Reference

Brian Sanford (born September 12, 1987) is an American former professional football player who was a defensive end in the National Football League (NFL). He was signed by the Cleveland Browns as an undrafted free agent in 2010. He played college football for the Temple Owls, and was a postgraduate player at the Connecticut boarding school, Westminster School.

== College career ==
He played college football at Temple University for the Owls.

== Professional career ==
=== Cleveland Browns ===
After going undrafted in the 2010 NFL draft, Sanford signed with the Cleveland Browns as an undrafted free agent on May 17, 2010. He was cut on September 4, 2010. He was added to the Browns' practice squad the following day.

In 2011, Sanford appeared in 5 games for the Cleveland Browns. In 2012, Sanford spent the first 7 weeks of the season on the practice squad until he was placed on the active roster on October 27, 2012.

On August 19, 2013, Sanford was traded to the Seattle Seahawks for guard John Moffitt. On August 20, 2013, the trade was rescinded, reportedly due to Moffitt failing his physical.

=== Oakland Raiders ===
Sanford was claimed off waivers by the Oakland Raiders on September 1, 2013.

=== Second stint with Cleveland ===
Sanford re-signed with the Browns on December 25, 2013. He was released on May 12, 2014.

=== Denver Broncos ===
Sanford signed with the Denver Broncos in August 2014.
