= 2011 Cleveland Browns season =

63rd season in franchise history; final full one under Lerner ownership

- Owner: Randy Lerner
- General manager: Tom Heckert
- Head coach: Pat Shurmur
- Defensive coordinator: Dick Jauron
- Home stadium: Cleveland Browns Stadium

Results
- Record: 4–12
- Division place: 4th AFC North
- Playoffs: Did not qualify
- Pro Bowlers: T Joe Thomas

The 2011 season was the Cleveland Browns' 59th in the National Football League (NFL) and their 63rd overall. They were eliminated from playoff contention in Week 14 and ultimately finished with a 4–12 record, one win less than in 2010 season, when they finished 5–11 and placed third in the AFC North. This season marked the second season under the leadership of team president Mike Holmgren and general manager Tom Heckert, as well as the first season under head coach Pat Shurmur. The Browns played all of their home games at Cleveland Browns Stadium in Cleveland, Ohio.

== Off-season ==
=== Personnel changes ===
On January 3, 2011, one day after the 2010 season, the Browns fired head coach Eric Mangini. In two seasons with the Browns, Mangini had a record of 10–22 and a disappointing 2–10 record against division opponents.

On January 13, the team hired former St. Louis Rams' offensive coordinator Pat Shurmur to replace Mangini as head coach. Shurmur served as the Rams' offensive coordinator from 2009–2010, and was an offensive assistant with the Philadelphia Eagles from 1999–2008. This is his first opportunity as an NFL head coach.

On January 21, Shurmur made his first addition to the coaching staff, by hiring Dick Jauron as defensive coordinator. Jauron, who most recently served as the Philadelphia Eagles' secondary coach, has served as defensive coordinator for the Jacksonville Jaguars from 1995–98, head coach of the Chicago Bears from 1999–2003, and head coach of the Buffalo Bills from 2006–09. Jauron replaces Rob Ryan, who became the defensive coordinator of the Dallas Cowboys.

On January 25, the Browns hired Chris Tabor as special teams coordinator. Tabor most recently served as the Chicago Bears' assistant special teams coach from 2008–2010. Tabor replaces Brad Seely, who became the special teams coordinator of the San Francisco 49ers.

On January 31, the Browns added four new coaches to their staff. The Browns hired former Oakland Raiders defensive line coach Dwaine Board as defensive line coach, former Arizona Cardinals defensive coordinator Billy Davis as linebackers coach, former University of Miami offensive coordinator Mark Whipple as quarterbacks coach, and former NFL wide receiver Mike Wilson as wide receivers coach.

The rest of the Browns' position coaches were retained from Mangini's staff. The Browns have not hired an offensive coordinator, as Shurmur intends to call the offensive plays for the team.

=== Scheme Changes ===
This season marks the Browns' transition into the West Coast Offense of Coach Pat Shurmur and the 4–3 defense of defensive coordinator Dick Jauron.

=== Roster changes ===
==== Free Agency ====
Pos.	Player	Tag	2011 Team	Signed
DE	Titus Adams	UFA		
RB	Mike Bell	UFA	Lions	August 9
OLB	Marcus Benard	ERFA	Browns	July 29
ILB	Titus Brown	ERFA	Browns	August 3
ILB	Blake Costanzo	UFA	49ers	August 3
K	Phil Dawson	UFA	Browns	July 29
QB	Jake Delhomme	UFA	Texans	November 29
SS	Abram Elam	UFA	Cowboys	August 3
TE	Greg Estandia	UFA		
ILB	D'Qwell Jackson	UFA	Browns	March 3
DE	Jayme Mitchell	UFA	Browns	August 1
TE	Evan Moore	ERFA	Browns	July 29
FS	Sabby Piscitelli	UFA	Chiefs	August 4
DE	Derreck Robinson	UFA	Browns	July 31
OLB	Matt Roth	UFA	Jaguars	August 12
DE	Brian Schaefering	ERFA	Browns	July 29
TE	Alex Smith	UFA	Browns	August 1
DE	Robaire Smith	UFA		
FS	Nick Sorensen	UFA		
WR	Chansi Stuckey	UFA	Cardinals	July 29
ILB	Jason Trusnik	UFA	Dolphins	July 29
FB	Lawrence Vickers	UFA	Texans	August 3
QB	Seneca Wallace	UFA	Browns	March 3
G	Floyd Womack	UFA	Cardinals	July 31
CB	Eric Wright	UFA	Lions	July 31
G	Billy Yates	UFA	Browns	July 29

Player re-signed by Browns

F The Browns placed the franchise tag on Dawson

Pos.	Player	Released	2011 Team	Signed
LB	Eric Alexander	July 28
LB	Eric Barton	February 9
LB	David Bowens	February 9
DE	Kenyon Coleman	February 9	Cowboys	July 29
QB	Jake Delhomme	July 28
TE	Tyson DeVree	July 28	Colts	July 31
DT	Shaun Rogers	February 9	Saints	March 1
TE	Robert Royal	February 9
T	John St. Clair	February 9

==== Signings ====
Pos.	Player	2010 Team	Signed
RB	Brandon Jackson	Packers	July 29
P	Richmond McGee	Bears	August 3
CB	Dmitri Patterson	Eagles	August 2
FS	Usama Young	Saints	July 29

==== Trades ====
Date	Trade Partner(s)	Player(s) Traded	Player(s) Acquired	Notes
July 29	St. Louis Rams	2012 conditional 7th round Draft Pick	G John Greco	

==== 2011 Draft class ====
Round	Pick	Player	Position	College	Signed	Notes
1	21	Phil Taylor	Defensive tackle	Baylor	August 2	From Kansas City
2	37	Jabaal Sheard	Defensive end	Pittsburgh	July 29	
2	59	Greg Little	Wide receiver	North Carolina	July 29	From Atlanta
4	102	Jordan Cameron	Tight end	USC	July 29	
4	124	Owen Marecic	Fullback	Stanford	July 29	From Atlanta
5	137	Buster Skrine	Cornerback	Chattanooga	July 29	
5	150	Jason Pinkston	Offensive tackle	Pittsburgh	July 29	From NY Giants via Minnesota
7	248	Eric Hagg	Safety	Nebraska	July 29	Compensatory selection

The Browns did not have a 3rd or 6th round selection. The Browns traded their original 7th round selection but later received a new 7th round selection as a compensatory pick.

==== Undrafted free agents ====
Pos.	Player	College	Signed	Cut
OLB	Derrick Addai	Kentucky State	July 29	August 3
G	Dominic Alford	Minnesota	July 26	September 3
DT	Kyle Anderson	Georgetown College	July 26	August 28
DT	Andre Carroll	Delaware State	July 29	September 3
WR	L.J. Castile	Delta State	July 29	September 3
CB	James Dockery	Oregon State	July 26	
OLB	Archie Donald	Toledo	August 3	September 3
DE	Jabari Fletcher	Appalachian State	July 26	August 28
T	Calton Ford	Norfolk State	July 29	September 3
TE	Evan Frosch	TCU	July 29	September 3
CB	Carl Gettis	Missouri	July 26	September 3
OLB	Eric Gordon	Michigan State	August 3	September 3
CB	Darian Hagan	Cal	July 29	August 28
LB	Benjamin Jacobs	Fresno State	July 29	
WR	Chris Matthews	Kentucky	July 26	September 3
WR	Juan Nunez	Western Michigan	July 26	August 28
T	Jarrod Shaw	Tennessee	July 29	September 3
RB	Armond Smith	Union College	July 29	
OLB	Brian Smith	Notre Dame	July 26	September 3
OLB	Sidney Tarver	Tennessee State	July 26	September 3
QB	Troy Weatherhead	Hillsdale College*	July 26	August 28
K	Jeff Wolfert	Missouri	July 29	August 28
MLB	Alex Wujciak	Maryland	July 26	August 3

* Weatherhead also played for the Cleveland Gladiators of the Arena Football League.

=== Uniform changes ===
On June 16, it was announced that the Browns would be wearing white jerseys for all home games. The Browns had previously worn white at home during the 1950s–1980s and again in the early 2000s. Because the home team for all Browns' away games chose to wear their colored jersey, the Browns wore the same uniform for all 16 games for the first time in franchise history (although the Browns wore their brown jerseys for three preseason games).

== Staff ==
Cleveland Browns 2011 staff
Front office: Owner – Randy Lerner; President – Mike Holmgren; Executive vice president of business operations – Bryan Wiedmeier; General manager – Tom Heckert; Vice president of football operations – Mark Schiefelbein; Vice president of football administration – Matt Thomas; Director of player personnel – Jon Sandusky; Director of college scouting – John Spytek; Head coaches: Head coach – Pat Shurmur; Assistant to the head coach – Luke Steckel; Offensive coaches: Quarterbacks – Mark Whipple; Running backs – Gary Brown; Wide receivers – Mike Wilson; Tight ends – Steve Hagen; Offensive line – George Warhop; Senior offensive assistant – Keith Gilbertson; Offensive assistant – Chris Beake	Defensive coaches: Defensive coordinator – Dick Jauron; Defensive line – Dwaine Board; Linebackers – Billy Davis; Defensive backs – Jerome Henderson; Senior defensive assistant – Ray Rhodes; Defensive assistant – Chuck Bullough; Special teams coaches: Special teams coordinator – Chris Tabor; Special teams assistant – Shawn Mennenga; Strength and conditioning: Strength and conditioning – Kent Johnston; Assistant strength and conditioning – Rick Lyle

== Roster ==
2011 Cleveland Browns roster
Quarterbacks (QB): 9 Thad Lewis; 12 Colt McCoy; 6 Seneca Wallace; Running backs (RB): 31 Montario Hardesty; 40 Peyton Hillis; 48 Owen Marecic FB; 25 Chris Ogbonnaya; 44 Eddie Williams FB; Wide receivers (WR): 16 Josh Cribbs RS; 15 Greg Little; 11 Mohamed Massaquoi; 18 Carlton Mitchell; 10 Jordan Norwood; 13 Rod Windsor; Tight ends (TE): 84 Jordan Cameron; 87 Dan Gronkowski; 89 Evan Moore	Offensive linemen (OL): 72 Oniel Cousins T/G; 77 John Greco G; 75 Artis Hicks G/T; 66 Shawn Lauvao G; 55 Alex Mack C; 79 Tony Pashos T; 62 Jason Pinkston G; 73 Joe Thomas T; 60 Steve Vallos C; Defensive linemen (DL): 94 Auston English DE; 92 Jayme Mitchell DE; 69 Scott Paxson DT; 71 Ahtyba Rubin DT; 70 Brian Sanford DE; 91 Brian Schaefering DT; 97 Jabaal Sheard DE; 98 Phil Taylor DT; 67 Kiante Tripp DT	Linebackers (LB): 51 Chris Gocong OLB; 52 D'Qwell Jackson MLB; 54 Ben Jacobs OLB; 56 Kaluka Maiava OLB; 53 Brian Smith MLB; 90 Quinton Spears OLB; Defensive backs (DB): 20 Mike Adams FS; 24 Sheldon Brown CB; 34 James Dockery CB; 23 Joe Haden CB; 27 Eric Hagg SS; 21 Dimitri Patterson CB; 22 Buster Skrine CB; 41 Ray Ventrone FS; 28 Usama Young SS; Special teams (ST): 4 Phil Dawson K; 7 Brad Maynard P; 57 Christian Yount LS	Practice squad: 78 Dominic Alford G; 88 Torrey Grissett WR; 95 Ayanga Okpokowuruk DE; 93 Craig Robertson LB; 74 Jarrod Shaw G; 36 David Sims S; 35 Armond Smith RB; 17 Owen Spencer WR; Reserve: 58 Marcus Benard OLB (NF-Inj.); 59 Titus Brown MLB (IR); 99 Scott Fujita OLB (IR); 2 Reggie Hodges P (IR); 29 Brandon Jackson RB (IR); 8 Richmond McGee P (IR); 81 Alex Smith TE (IR); 65 Eric Steinbach G (IR); 96 Emmanuel Stephens DE (IR); 43 T. J. Ward SS (IR); 82 Ben Watson TE (IR); Rookies in italics 53 active, 11 reserve, 8 practice squad

== Preseason ==
=== Schedule ===
The Browns' preseason schedule was announced on April 12, 2011.

Week	Date	Opponent	Result	Record	Game site	NFL.com recap
1	August 13	Green Bay Packers	W 27–17	1–0	Cleveland Browns Stadium	Recap
2	August 19	Detroit Lions	L 28–30	1–1	Cleveland Browns Stadium	Recap
3	August 25	at Philadelphia Eagles	L 14–24	1–2	Lincoln Financial Field	Recap
4	September 1	at Chicago Bears	L 14–24	1–3	Soldier Field	Recap

=== Roster Moves ===
After the third preseason game, all NFL teams had to reduce their rosters to 80 players. On August 28, The Browns released eight players, the majority of them being undrafted free agents.

After the final preseason game, all teams had to reduce their rosters to 53 players. The Browns released 25 players and placed two players – RB Brandon Jackson and G Eric Steinbach – on injured reserve. Notable players released include QB Jarrett Brown and DB Coye Francies.

== Regular season ==
=== Schedule ===
Week	Date	Opponent	Result	Record	Game site	NFL.com recap
1	September 11	**Cincinnati Bengals**	**L** 17–27	0–1	Cleveland Browns Stadium	Recap
2	September 18	at Indianapolis Colts	**W** 27–19	1–1	Lucas Oil Stadium	Recap
3	September 25	Miami Dolphins	**W** 17–16	2–1	Cleveland Browns Stadium	Recap
4	October 2	Tennessee Titans	**L** 13–31	2–2	Cleveland Browns Stadium	Recap
5	Bye					
6	October 16	at Oakland Raiders	**L** 17–24	2–3	O.co Coliseum	Recap
7	October 23	Seattle Seahawks	**W** 6–3	3–3	Cleveland Browns Stadium	Recap
8	October 30	at San Francisco 49ers	**L** 10–20	3–4	Candlestick Park	Recap
9	November 6	at Houston Texans	**L** 12–30	3–5	Reliant Stadium	Recap
10	November 13	St. Louis Rams	**L** 12–13	3–6	Cleveland Browns Stadium	Recap
11	November 20	Jacksonville Jaguars	**W** 14–10	4–6	Cleveland Browns Stadium	Recap
12	November 27	at **Cincinnati Bengals**	**L** 20–23	4–7	Paul Brown Stadium	Recap
13	December 4	**Baltimore Ravens**	**L** 10–24	4–8	Cleveland Browns Stadium	Recap
14	December 8	at **Pittsburgh Steelers**	**L** 3–14	4–9	Heinz Field	Recap
15	December 18	at Arizona Cardinals	**L** 17–20 (OT)	4–10	University of Phoenix Stadium	Recap
16	December 24	at **Baltimore Ravens**	**L** 14–20	4–11	M&T Bank Stadium	Recap
17	January 1	**Pittsburgh Steelers**	**L** 9–13	4–12	Cleveland Browns Stadium	Recap

Note: Intra-divisional opponents are in bold text.

=== Game summaries ===
==== Week 1: vs. Cincinnati Bengals ====
Week 1: Cincinnati Bengals at Cleveland Browns – Game summary

Quarter	1	2	3	4	Total
**Bengals**	10	3	0	14	**27**
Browns	0	14	3	0	**17**

at Cleveland Browns Stadium, Cleveland, Ohio

- Date: September 11
- Game time: 1:00 p.m. EDT
- Game weather: 72 °F (22 °C) (Partly Cloudy)
- Game attendance: 67,321
- Referee: Bill Leavy
- TV announcers (CBS): Kevin Harlan and Solomon Wilcots
- Recap

Game information

**First quarter**

- CIN (8:20) – Mike Nugent 24 yd field goal
  **Bengals 3, Browns 0** Drive: 10 plays, 35 yds, 4:40
- CIN (2:22) – Jermaine Gresham 2 yd pass from Andy Dalton (Mike Nugent kick)
  **Bengals 10, Browns 0** Drive: 7 plays, 41 yds, 4:03

**Second quarter**

- CIN (11:30) – Mike Nugent 47 yd field goal
  **Bengals 13, Browns 0** Drive: 9 plays, 42 yds, 4:24
- CLE (9:17) – Benjamin Watson 34 yd pass from Colt McCoy (Phil Dawson kick)
  **Bengals 13, Browns 7** Drive: 4 plays, 57 yds, 2:13
- CLE (4:14) – Evan Moore 2 yd pass from Colt McCoy (Phil Dawson kick)
  **Browns 14, Bengals 13** Drive: 9 plays, 90 yds, 3:21

**Third quarter**

- CLE (8:36) – Phil Dawson 20 yd field goal
  **Browns 17, Bengals 13** Drive: 10 plays, 50 yds, 4:50

**Fourth quarter**

- CIN (4:28) – A. J. Green 41 yd pass from Bruce Gradkowski (Mike Nugent kick)
  **Bengals 20, Browns 17** Drive: 5 plays, 62 yds, 1:51
- CIN (1:49) – Cedric Benson 39 yd run (Mike Nugent kick)
  **Bengals 27, Browns 17** Drive: 3 plays, 46 yds, 0:18

**Top passers**

- CIN – Andy Dalton – 10/15, 81 yds, 1 TD
- CLE – Colt McCoy – 19/40, 213 yds, 2 TD, 1 INT

**Top rushers**

- CIN – Cedric Benson – 25 carr, 121 yds, 1 TD
- CLE – Peyton Hillis – 17 carr, 57 yds

**Top receivers**

- CIN – Jermaine Gresham – 6 rec, 58 yds, 1 TD
- CLE – Benjamin Watson – 3 rec, 45 yds, 1 TD

**Top tacklers**

- CIN – Reggie Nelson – 9 tackles, 1 sack
- CLE – D'Qwell Jackson – 11 tackles, 2 sacks

The Bengals struck first with two Mike Nugent field goals and a Jermaine Gresham touchdown reception. Trailing 13–0, the Browns struck back, with Colt McCoy completing two touchdown passes to give Cleveland the lead at halftime. Phil Dawson gave the Browns an insurance field goal, but late in the fourth, Bengals backup quarterback Bruce Gradkowski caught the Browns defense slow out of the huddle and hit A. J. Green for a 41-yard touchdown that proved to be the game winner.

==== Week 2: at Indianapolis Colts ====
Week 2: Cleveland Browns at Indianapolis Colts – Game summary

Quarter	1	2	3	4	Total
**Browns**	0	14	0	13	**27**
Colts	3	6	3	7	**19**

at Lucas Oil Stadium, Indianapolis, Indiana

- Date: September 18
- Game time: 1:00 p.m. EDT
- Game weather: Domed stadium
- Game attendance: 65,035
- Referee: Gene Steratore
- TV announcers (CBS): Marv Albert and Rich Gannon
- Recap

Game information

**First quarter**

- IND (10:31) – Adam Vinatieri 39 yd field goal
  **Colts 3, Browns 0** Drive: 10 plays, 67 yds, 4:29

**Second quarter**

- IND (14:15) – Adam Vinatieri 27 yd field goal
  **Colts 6, Browns 0** Drive: 10 plays, 78 yds, 4:40
- CLE (7:53) – Evan Moore 16 yd pass from Colt McCoy (Phil Dawson kick)
  **Browns 7, Colts 6** Drive: 11 plays, 55 yds, 6:22
- IND (3:53) – Adam Vinatieri 52 yd field goal
  **Colts 9, Browns 7** Drive: 10 plays, 34 yds, 4:00
- CLE (0:15) – Peyton Hillis 1 yd run (Phil Dawson kick)
  **Browns 14, Colts 9** Drive: 10 plays, 80 yds, 3:28

**Third quarter**

- IND (6:52) – Adam Vinatieri 36 yd field goal
  **Browns 14, Colts 12** Drive: 9 plays, 42 yds, 3:52

**Fourth quarter**

- CLE (10:57) – Phil Dawson 20 yd field goal
  **Browns 17, Colts 12** Drive: 7 plays, 19 yds, 3:49
- CLE (3:55) – Peyton Hillis 24 yd run (Phil Dawson kick)
  **Browns 24, Colts 12** Drive: 3 plays, 28 yds, 0:55
- CLE (2:59) – Phil Dawson 23 yd field goal
  **Browns 27, Colts 12** Drive: 4 plays, 9 yds, 0:24
- IND (0:24) – Dallas Clark 6 yd pass from Kerry Collins (Adam Vinatieri kick)
  **Browns 27, Colts 19** Drive: 12 plays, 83 yds, 2:35

**Top passers**

- CLE – Colt McCoy 22/32, 211 yds, 1 TD
- IND – Kerry Collins 19/38, 191 yds, 1 TD, 1 INT

**Top rushers**

- CLE – Peyton Hillis 27 carr, 94 yds, 2 TD
- IND – Joseph Addai 14 carr, 64 yds

**Top receivers**

- CLE – Mohamed Massaquoi 3 rec, 45 yds
- IND – Reggie Wayne 4 rec, 66 yds

**Top tacklers**

- CLE – D'Qwell Jackson 8 tackles
- IND – Kavell Conner 10 tackles

The Colts moved the ball well early, but had to settle for two Adam Vinatieri field goals to take a 6–0 lead. The Browns answered with an Evan Moore touchdown reception from Colt McCoy. The Colts briefly regained the lead on another Vinatieri field goal, but the Browns responded with a Peyton Hillis touchdown run to take a 14–9 lead into halftime. The Colts added another field goal in the third, but the Browns scored 13 unanswered points in the fourth to put the game away and defeat the Colts 27–19.

==== Week 3: vs. Miami Dolphins ====
Week 3: Miami Dolphins at Cleveland Browns – Game summary

Quarter	1	2	3	4	Total
Dolphins	7	3	3	3	**16**
**Browns**	0	7	3	7	**17**

at Cleveland Browns Stadium, Cleveland, Ohio

- Date: September 25
- Game time: 1:00 p.m. EDT
- Game weather: 77 °F (25 °C) (Sunny)
- Game attendance: 66,651
- Referee: Walt Anderson
- TV announcers (CBS): Don Criqui and Randy Cross
- Recap

Game information

**First quarter**

- MIA (8:09) – Daniel Thomas 10 yd pass from Chad Henne (Dan Carpenter kick)
  **Dolphins 7, Browns 0** Drive: 4 plays, 43 yds, 1:56

**Second quarter**

- CLE (7:16) – Joshua Cribbs 33 yd pass from Colt McCoy (Phil Dawson kick)
  **Browns 7, Dolphins 7** Drive: 6 plays, 59 yds, 2:43
- MIA (0:27) – Dan Carpenter 23 yd field goal
  **Dolphins 10, Browns 7** Drive: 11 plays, 75 yds, 3:38

**Third quarter**

- CLE (10:37) – Phil Dawson 30 yd field goal
  **Browns 10, Dolphins 10** Drive: 9 plays, 68 yds, 4:23
- MIA (2:29) – Dan Carpenter 41 yd field goal
  **Dolphins 13, Browns 10** Drive: 14 plays, 70 yds, 8:08

**Fourth quarter**

- MIA (3:23) – Dan Carpenter 38 yd field goal
  **Dolphins 16, Browns 10** Drive: 8 plays, 39 yds, 2:57
- CLE (0:43) – Mohamed Massaquoi 14 yd pass from Colt McCoy (Phil Dawson kick)
  **Browns 17, Dolphins 16** Drive: 13 plays, 80 yds, 2:40

**Top passers**

- MIA – Chad Henne 19/29, 255 yds, 1 TD, 1 INT
- CLE – Colt McCoy 19/39, 210 yds, 2 TD, 1 INT

**Top rushers**

- MIA – Daniel Thomas 23 carr, 95 yds
- CLE – Montario Hardesty 14 carr, 67 yds

**Top receivers**

- MIA – Brian Hartline 4 rec, 87 yds
- CLE – Benjamin Watson 5 rec, 64 yds

**Top tacklers**

- MIA – Will Allen 5 tackles
- CLE – Ahtyba Rubin 8 tackles, 1.5 sacks

The Browns faced the Dolphins who were without their leading rusher Peyton Hillis. Miami took an early lead, converting a Colt McCoy interception into a 7–0 lead on a touchdown pass from Chad Henne. Cleveland tied the game on a touchdown pass from McCoy to Joshua Cribbs. The Dolphins took the lead again on a Dan Carpenter field goal, 10–7, into halftime. The Browns again tied the game in the third with Phil Dawson's field goal. The Dolphins added two more field goals and had the Browns down six points in the final minutes. McCoy led the Browns down the field and hit Mohamed Massaquoi on a 14-yard touchdown pass to give the Browns a last-minute win.

==== Week 4: vs. Tennessee Titans ====
Week 4: Tennessee Titans at Cleveland Browns – Game summary

Quarter	1	2	3	4	Total
**Titans**	7	14	10	0	**31**
Browns	3	3	0	7	**13**

at Cleveland Browns Stadium, Cleveland, Ohio

- Date: October 2
- Game time: 1:00 p.m. EDT
- Game weather: 55 °F (13 °C) (Rain)
- Game attendance: 66,240
- Referee: Pete Morelli
- TV announcers (CBS): Marv Albert and Rich Gannon
- Recap

Game information

**First quarter**

**Second quarter**

**Third quarter**

**Fourth quarter**

**Top passers**

- TEN –
- CLE –

**Top rushers**

- TEN –
- CLE –

**Top receivers**

- TEN –
- CLE –

**Top tacklers**

- TEN –
- CLE –

==== Week 6: at Oakland Raiders ====
Week Six: Cleveland Browns at Oakland Raiders – Game summary

Quarter	1	2	3	4	Total
Browns	0	7	0	10	**17**
**Raiders**	7	7	10	0	**24**

at O.co Coliseum, Oakland, California

- Date: October 16
- Game time: 4:05 p.m. EDT/1:05 p.m. PDT
- Game weather: 71 °F (22 °C), Sunny
- Game attendance: 57,300
- Referee: Carl Cheffers
- TV announcers (CBS): Marv Albert and Rich Gannon

Game information

**First quarter**

**Second quarter**

**Third quarter**

**Fourth quarter**

**Top passers**

- CLE –
- OAK –

**Top rushers**

- CLE –
- OAK –

**Top receivers**

- CLE –
- OAK –

**Top tacklers**

- CLE –
- OAK –

==== Week 7: vs. Seattle Seahawks ====
Week Seven: Seattle Seahawks at Cleveland Browns – Game summary

Quarter	1	2	3	4	Total
Seahawks	0	0	3	0	**3**
**Browns**	0	3	0	3	**6**

at Cleveland Browns Stadium, Cleveland, Ohio

- Date: October 23
- Game time: 1:00 p.m. EDT
- Game weather: 62 °F (17 °C), (Sunny)
- Game attendance: 66,350
- Referee: Mike Carey
- TV announcers (Fox): Ron Pitts, Jim Mora, Jr. and Drea Avent

Game information

**First quarter**

**Second quarter**

**Third quarter**

**Fourth quarter**

**Top passers**

- SEA –
- CLE –

**Top rushers**

- SEA –
- CLE –

**Top receivers**

- SEA –
- CLE –

**Top tacklers**

- SEA –
- CLE –

==== Week 8: at San Francisco 49ers ====
Week Six: Cleveland Browns at San Francisco 49ers – Game summary

Quarter	1	2	3	4	Total
Browns	0	3	0	7	**10**
**49ers**	10	7	0	3	**20**

at Candlestick Park, San Francisco, California

- Date: October 30
- Game time: 4:15 p.m. EDT/1:15 p.m. PDT
- Game weather: 67 °F (19 °C), Sunny
- Game attendance: 69,732
- Referee: Bill Leavy
- TV announcers (CBS): Ian Eagle and Dan Fouts

Game information

**First quarter**

**Second quarter**

**Third quarter**

**Fourth quarter**

**Top passers**

- CLE –
- SF –

**Top rushers**

- CLE –
- SF –

**Top receivers**

- CLE –
- SF –

**Top tacklers**

- CLE –
- SF –

==== Week 9: at Houston Texans ====
Week Nine: Cleveland Browns at Houston Texans – Game summary

Quarter	1	2	3	4	Total
Browns	3	0	3	6	**12**
**Texans**	14	10	3	3	**30**

at Reliant Stadium, Houston, Texas

- Date: November 6
- Game time: 1:00 p.m. EST/12:00 p.m. CST
- Game weather: Played indoors (retractable roof closed)
- Game attendance: 71,511
- Referee: Alberto Riveron
- TV announcers (CBS): Ian Eagle and Dan Fouts

Game information

First quarter'

- HOU – Ben Tate 27-yard run (Neil Rackers kick), 9:50. Texans 7–0. **Drive: 9 plays, 82 yards, 5:10.**
- HOU – Matt Schaub 2-yard run (Neil Rackers kick), 7:11. Texans 14–0. **Drive: 6 plays, 21 yards, 2:29.**
- CLE – Phil Dawson 50-yard field goal, 3:43. Texans 14–3. **Drive: 7 plays, 20 yards, 3:28.**

**Second quarter**

- HOU – Arian Foster 19-yard run (Neil Rackers kick), 8:06. Texans 21–3. **Drive: 7 plays, 71 yards, 3:54.**
- HOU – Neil Rackers 28-yard field goal, 0:00. Texans 24–3. **Drive: 1 play, 0 yards, 0:02.**

**Third quarter**

- HOU – Neil Rackers 21-yard field goal, 5:45. Texans 27–3. **Drive: 13 plays, 78 yards, 7:19.**
- CLE – Phil Dawson 51-yard field goal, 2:08. Texans 27–6. **Drive: 8 plays, 35 yards, 3:37.**

**Fourth quarter**

- HOU – Neil Rackers 50-yard field goal, 10:35. Texans 30–6. **Drive: 12 plays, 47 yards, 6:33.**
- CLE – Josh Cribbs 2-yard pass from Colt McCoy (pass failed), 4:47. Texans 30–12. **Drive: 11 plays, 64 yards, 5:48.**

**Top passers**

- CLE – Colt McCoy – 14/22, 146 yards, TD, INT
- HOU – Matt Schaub – 14/23, 119 yards, INT

**Top rushers**

- CLE – Chris Ogbonnaya – 13 rushes, 28 yards
- HOU – Arian Foster – 19 rushes, 124 yards, TD

**Top receivers**

- CLE – Josh Cribbs – 5 receptions, 50 yards, TD
- HOU – Owen Daniels – 3 receptions, 32 yards

In reaction to this game, comedian Mike Polk filmed a video at Cleveland Browns Stadium in which he berated the Browns and dubbed the stadium a "factory of sadness", a nickname that has caught on for both the stadium and the team.

==== Week 10: vs. St. Louis Rams ====
Week Ten: St. Louis Rams at Cleveland Browns – Game summary

Quarter	1	2	3	4	Total
**Rams**	0	10	0	3	**13**
Browns	3	6	3	0	**12**

at Cleveland Browns Stadium, Cleveland, Ohio

- Date: November 13
- Game time: 1:00 p.m. EST
- Game weather: 63 °F (17 °C), (Cloudy) / Windy Gusting to Gale Force
- Game attendance: 64,900
- Referee: Clete Blakeman
- TV announcers (Fox): Ron Pitts, Jim Mora, Jr. and Drea Avent

Game information

**First quarter**

**Second quarter**

**Third quarter**

**Fourth quarter**

**Top passers**

- STL –
- CLE –

**Top rushers**

- STL –
- CLE –

**Top receivers**

- STL –
- CLE –

**Top tacklers**

- STL –
- CLE –

==== Week 11: vs. Jacksonville Jaguars ====
Week Eleven: Jacksonville Jaguars at Cleveland Browns – Game summary

Quarter	1	2	3	4	Total
Jaguars	0	7	0	3	**10**
**Browns**	0	7	0	7	**14**

at Cleveland Browns Stadium, Cleveland, Ohio

- Date: November 20
- Game time: 1:00 p.m. EST
- Game weather: 52 °F (11 °C), (Cloudy)
- Game attendance: 63,498
- Referee: Terry McAulay
- TV announcers (CBS): Bill Macatee and Steve Tasker

Game information

**First quarter**

**Second quarter**

**Third quarter**

**Fourth quarter**

**Top passers**

- JAC –
- CLE –

**Top rushers**

- JAC –
- CLE –

**Top receivers**

- JAC –
- CLE –

**Top tacklers**

- JAC –
- CLE –

==== Week 12: at Cincinnati Bengals ====
Week Twelve: Cleveland Browns at Cincinnati Bengals – Game summary

Quarter	1	2	3	4	Total
Browns	7	10	3	0	**20**
**Bengals**	7	0	10	6	**23**

at Paul Brown Stadium, Cincinnati, Ohio

- Date: November 27
- Game time: 1:00 p.m. EST
- Game weather: 57 °F (14 °C), Rainy
- Game attendance: 48,260
- Referee: Walt Anderson
- TV announcers (CBS): Bill Macatee and Steve Tasker

Game information

**First quarter**

**Second quarter**

**Third quarter**

**Fourth quarter**

**Top passers**

- CLE – Colt McCoy – 16/34, 151 YDS, 2 TD
- CIN – Andy Dalton – 21/31, 270 YDS, 1 TD

**Top rushers**

- CLE – Peyton Hillis – 19 CAR, 65 YDS, 0 TD
- CIN – Cedric Benson – 21 CAR, 106 YDS, 1 TD

**Top receivers**

- CLE – Jordan Norwood – 4 REC, 69 YDS, 0 TD
- CIN – A. J. Green – 3 REC, 110 YDS, 0 TD

**Top tacklers**

- CLE – D'Qwell Jackson – 5 TKL, 4 AST
- CIN – Rey Maualuga – 6 TKL, 4 AST

==== Week 13: vs. Baltimore Ravens ====
Week Thirteen: Baltimore Ravens at Cleveland Browns – Game summary

Quarter	1	2	3	4	Total
**Ravens**	0	10	7	7	**24**
Browns	0	0	3	7	**10**

at Cleveland Browns Stadium, Cleveland, Ohio

- Date: December 4
- Game time: 4:05 p.m. EST
- Game weather: 51 °F (11 °C), (Light Rain)
- Game attendance: 63,648
- Referee: Ed Hochuli
- TV announcers (CBS): Bill Macatee and Steve Tasker

Game information

**First quarter**

**Second quarter**

**Third quarter**

**Fourth quarter**

**Top passers**

- BAL –
- CLE –

**Top rushers**

- BAL –
- CLE –

**Top receivers**

- BAL –
- CLE –

**Top tacklers**

- BAL –
- CLE –

==== Week 14: at Pittsburgh Steelers ====
Week Fourteen: Cleveland Browns at Pittsburgh Steelers – Game summary

Quarter	1	2	3	4	Total
Browns	3	0	0	0	**3**
**Steelers**	7	0	0	7	**14**

at Heinz Field, Pittsburgh, Pennsylvania

- Date: December 8
- Game time: 8:20 p.m. EST
- Game weather: 31 °F (−1 °C), Fair
- Game attendance: 60,754
- Referee: Ed Hochuli
- TV announcers (NFLN): Brad Nessler, Mike Mayock and Alex Flanagan

Game information

**First quarter**

**Second quarter**

**Third quarter**

**Fourth quarter**

**Top passers**

- CLE –
- PIT –

**Top rushers**

- CLE –
- PIT –

**Top receivers**

- CLE –
- PIT –

**Top tacklers**

- CLE –
- PIT –

With the loss, the Browns were eliminated from playoff contention for the ninth consecutive season.

==== Week 15: at Arizona Cardinals ====
Week Fifteen: Cleveland Browns at Arizona Cardinals – Game summary

Quarter	1	2	3	4	OT	Total
Browns	7	3	7	0	0	**17**
**Cardinals**	0	7	0	10	3	**20**

at University of Phoenix Stadium, Glendale, Arizona

- Date: December 18
- Game time: 4:15 p.m. EST/2:15 p.m. MST
- Game weather: Played indoors (retractable roof closed)
- Game attendance: 60,443
- Referee: Scott Green
- TV announcers (CBS): Bill Macatee and Steve Tasker

Game information

**First quarter**

**Second quarter**

**Third quarter**

**Fourth quarter**

**Top passers**

- CLE –
- ARI –

**Top rushers**

- CLE –
- ARI –

**Top receivers**

- CLE –
- ARI –

**Top tacklers**

- CLE –
- ARI –

==== Week 16: at Baltimore Ravens ====
Week Sixteen: Cleveland Browns at Baltimore Ravens – Game summary

Quarter	1	2	3	4	Total
Browns	0	0	7	7	**14**
**Ravens**	10	7	3	0	**20**

at M&T Bank Stadium, Baltimore, Maryland

- Date: December 24
- Game time: 1:00 p.m. EST
- Game weather: 44 °F (7 °C), Partly Cloudy
- Game attendance: 71,083
- Referee: Walt Coleman
- TV announcers (CBS): Spero Dedes and Rich Gannon

Game information

**First quarter**

**Second quarter**

**Third quarter**

**Fourth quarter**

**Top passers**

- CLE –
- BAL –

**Top rushers**

- CLE –
- BAL –

**Top receivers**

- CLE –
- BAL –

**Top tacklers**

- CLE –
- BAL –

==== Week 17: vs. Pittsburgh Steelers ====
Week Seventeen: Pittsburgh Steelers at Cleveland Browns – Game summary

Quarter	1	2	3	4	Total
**Steelers**	0	3	10	0	**13**
Browns	0	6	3	0	**9**

at Cleveland Browns Stadium, Cleveland, Ohio

- Date: January 1
- Game time: 4:15 p.m. EST
- Game weather: 37 °F (3 °C), (mix of rain and snow)
- Game attendance: 68,266
- Referee: Alberto Riveron
- TV announcers (CBS): Kevin Harlan & Solomon Wilcots

Game information

**First quarter**

- No scoring plays

**Second quarter** CLEVELAND: Dawson 26-yard field goal (6:03)

**Cleveland Browns 3, Pittsburgh Steelers 0**

CLEVELAND: Dawson 45-yard field goal (1:06)

**Cleveland Browns 6, Pittsburgh Steelers 0**

PITTSBURGH: Suisham 19-yard field goal (0:00)

**Cleveland Browns 6, Pittsburgh Steelers 3**

**Third quarter**

PITTSBURGH: Suisham 29-yard field goal (9:43)

**Cleveland Browns 6, Pittsburgh Steelers 6**

PITTSBURGH: Redman 7 Yd Run (Suisham Kick) (5:27)

**Pittsburgh Steelers 13, Cleveland Browns 6**

CLEVELAND: Dawson 49-yard field goal (1:59)

**Pittsburgh Steelers 13, Cleveland Browns 9**

**Fourth quarter**

- No scoring plays

**Top passers**

- PIT – Roethlisberger, 221 yards
- CLE – Wallace, 177 yards

**Top rushers**

- PIT – Redman, 92 yards
- CLE – Wallace, 44 yards

**Top receivers**

- PIT – Brown, 90 yards
- CLE – Cribbs, 91 yards

**Top tacklers**

- PIT – Timmons, 6 tackles
- CLE – Jackson, 13 tackles

=== Standings ===
AFC North
	W	L	T	PCT	DIV	CONF	PF	PA	STK
^{(2)} Baltimore Ravens	12	4	0	.750	6–0	9–3	378	266	W2
^{(5)} Pittsburgh Steelers	12	4	0	.750	4–2	9–3	325	227	W2
^{(6)} Cincinnati Bengals	9	7	0	.563	2–4	6–6	344	323	L1
Cleveland Browns	4	12	0	.250	0–6	3–9	218	307	L6
