= Buster Skrine =

American football player (born 1989)

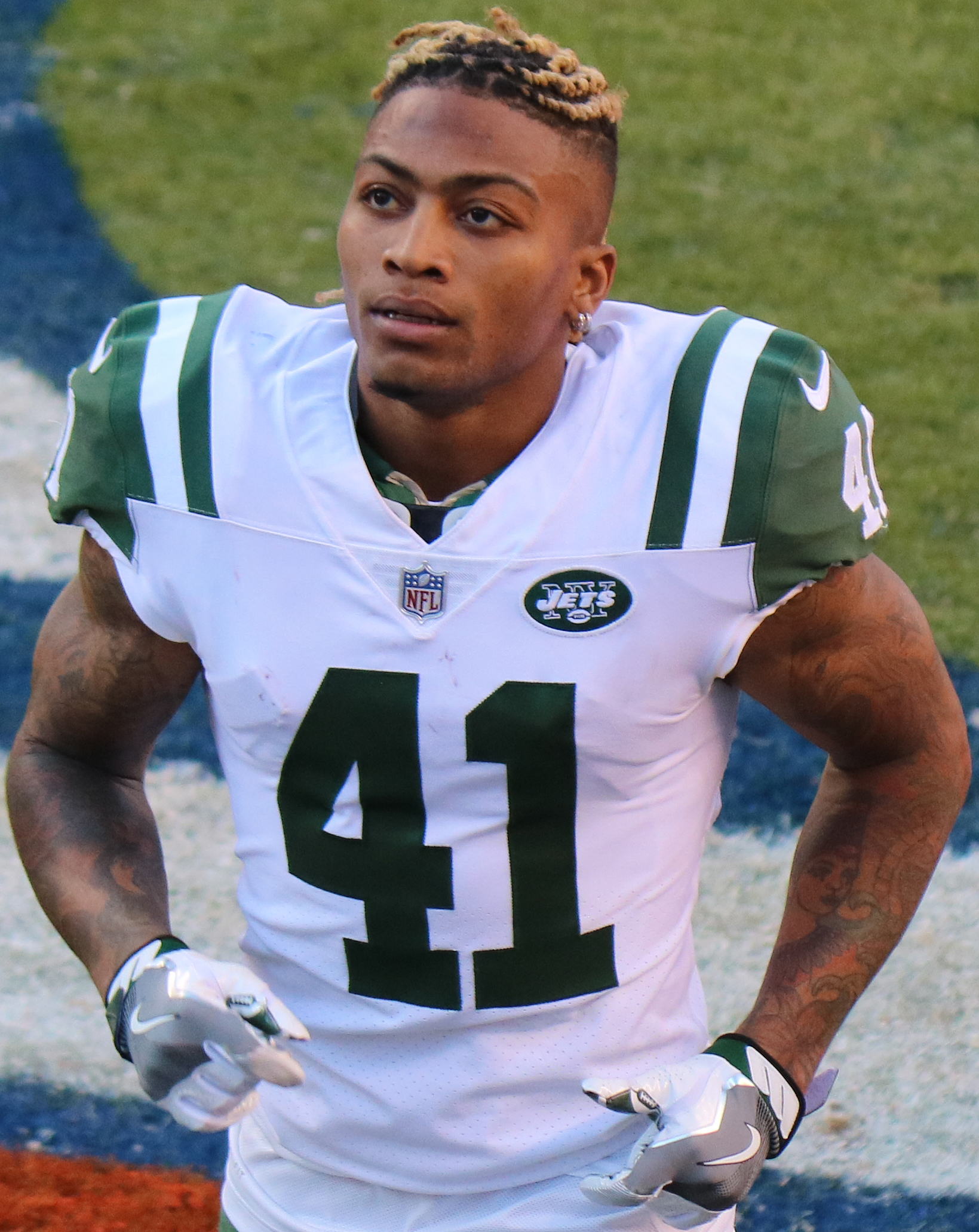
- Skrine with the New York Jets in 2017

No. 22, 41, 24, 38
- Position: Cornerback

Personal information
- Born: April 26, 1989 (age 37); Decatur, Georgia, U.S.
- Listed height: 5 ft 9 in (1.75 m)
- Listed weight: 187 lb (85 kg)

Career information
- High school: Etowah (Woodstock, Georgia)
- College: Chattanooga (2007–2010)
- NFL draft: 2011: 5th round, 137th overall pick

Career history
- Cleveland Browns (2011–2014); New York Jets (2015–2018); Chicago Bears (2019–2020); San Francisco 49ers (2021); Tennessee Titans (2021)

Career NFL statistics
- Total tackles: 590
- Sacks: 3.5
- Forced fumbles: 6
- Fumble recoveries: 4
- Pass deflections: 88
- Interceptions: 10
- Stats at Pro Football Reference

Daryl Frank "Buster" Skrine Jr. (/ˈskriːn/ SKREEN; born April 26, 1989) is an American former professional football player who was a cornerback for 11 seasons in the National Football League (NFL). He was selected by the Cleveland Browns in the fifth round of the 2011 NFL draft. He played college football for the Chattanooga Mocs.

Skrine played for the Browns for four seasons, and was a starter during his final two seasons with the team. He then signed with the New York Jets in 2015, where he started 48 games over the next four seasons. He then spent two seasons with the Chicago Bears, primarily as a reserve player. He began the 2021 season with the San Francisco 49ers, but only played in one game before being released. He signed with the Tennessee Titans later in the season, where he started in three of the team's final six games of the regular season and played in his only playoff game. Despite re-signing with the Titans in 2022, he retired later that offseason.

Skrine was arrested on August 9, 2023 in Canada for bank fraud-related charges.

== Early life ==
Skrine attended Etowah High School in Woodstock, Georgia, where he starred in both offense and defense. As a junior, he was named All-County at defensive back as a junior and was selected team's Most Valuable Player of the year after recording 61 tackles and two interceptions. He was a five-time County Player of the Week and helped lead the Eagles to an 8-4 record and the second-round of the state playoffs, where Etowah won its first Region 5A title in school history. As a senior, he led Cherokee County in rushing yards with 1,071 on 167 rushes and 15 touchdowns. He caught 17 balls for 363 yards and a score as a receiver, and also tallied 89 tackles from the secondary with 66 solo stops, had one interception and a fumble recovery. For his senior season, he earned All-county, All-region and All-state honors, and was named as the Cherokee County Player of the Year.

Skrine was also a top competitor in track & field. He won the 2007 County Championship in the triple jump (43-3 or 13.25m) and finished second in the long jump (22-7 or 6.92m), leading this to earn All-County honors in track.

== College career ==
Skrine attended the University of Tennessee at Chattanooga, where he was twice named to the first-team All-Southern Conference.

== Professional career ==
External videos
- Darryl Skrine's NFL Combine Workout

Pre-draft measurables
Height	Weight	Arm length	Hand span	Wingspan	40-yard dash	10-yard split	20-yard split	20-yard shuttle	Three-cone drill	Vertical jump	Broad jump	Bench press
5 ft 9 1/2 in (1.77 m)	186 lb (84 kg)	30 1/4 in (0.77 m)	8 7/8 in (0.23 m)	6 ft 0 1/4 in (1.84 m)	4.50 s	1.62 s	2.64 s	3.90 s	6.44 s	37.0 in (0.94 m)	10 ft 2 in (3.10 m)	20 reps
All values from NFL Combine

=== Cleveland Browns ===
==== 2011 ====
The Cleveland Browns selected Skrine in the fifth round (137th overall) of the 2011 NFL draft. Skrine was the 20th cornerback drafted in 2011.

On July 30, 2011, the Browns signed Skrine to a four-year, $2.24 million contract that includes $202,000 guaranteed.

Throughout training camp, Skrine competed for a job as a backup cornerback against Ramzee Robinson, Coye Francies, and Dimitri Patterson. Head coach Pat Shurmur named Skrine the fourth cornerback on the Browns' depth chart to begin the regular season, behind Joe Haden, Sheldon Brown, and Dimitri Patterson.

He made his professional regular season debut in the Cleveland Browns' season-opener against the Cincinnati Bengals and made two solo tackles in their 27–17 loss. Skrine made his first career tackle on kick returner Brandon Tate during a 35-yard kick return in the second quarter by Tate. On November 5, 2011, Skrine was elevated to nickelback after Dimitri Patterson sprained his knee the previous week. On December 18, 2011, Skrine recorded two solo tackles, a pass deflection, and made his first career interception during a 20–17 overtime loss at the Arizona Cardinals in Week 15. He intercepted a pass attempt by quarterback John Skelton that was originally intended for Early Doucet and returned it for five-yards in the fourth quarter. He completed his rookie season in 2011 with 18 combined tackles (14 solo), two pass deflections, and an interception in 16 games and zero starts. Defensive coordinator Dick Jauron primarily used Skrine in nickel and dime packages. He was also used on special teams.

==== 2012 ====
During training camp, Skrine competed against Dimitri Patterson for the job as the third cornerback. Head coach Pat Shurmur named Skrine the fourth cornerback on the depth chart to begin the season, behind Joe Haden, Sheldon Brown, and Dimitri Patterson. Skrine was elevated to the third cornerback on the depth chart after starting cornerback Joe Haden was suspended for the first four games after violating the league's substance abuse policy.

On September 16, 2012, Skrine earned his first career start after Sheldon Brown was demoted to nickelback. He recorded seven solo tackles during a 34–27 loss at the Cincinnati Bengals in Week 2. In Week 6, Skrine recorded nine combined tackles and a season-high three pass deflections in the Browns' 41–27 loss to the New York Giants. The following week, he collected a season-high 11 combined tackles (eight solo) during a 34–24 loss to the Cincinnati Bengals in Week 7. He finished his second season in 2012 with 85 combined tackles (72 solo), 11 pass deflections, and a fumble recovery in 16 games and six starts. On December 31, 2012, the Cleveland Browns fired head coach Pat Shurmur and general manager Tom Heckert, Jr. after the Browns finished with a 5–11 record.

==== 2013 ====
Throughout training camp, Skrine competed for the job as the starting cornerback against Chris Owens and Leon McFadden. Head coach Rob Chudzinski named Skrine a starting cornerback to open the regular season, alongside Joe Haden.

On September 15, 2013, Skrine made his first start of the season and collected a season-high nine combined tackles and broke up a pass in the Browns' 14–6 loss at the Baltimore Ravens in Week 2. In Week 4, he made two combined tackles, a season-high three pass deflections, and intercepted a pass by Andy Dalton during a 17–6 win against the Cincinnati Bengals. The following week, he made six solo tackles, two pass deflections, and made his first career sack in a 37–24 victory against the Buffalo Bills in Week 5. He sacked quarterback E. J. Manuel for a one-yard loss in the third quarter. He finished the 2013 season with 65 combined tackles (55 solo) a career-high 18 passes defensed, and a sack in 16 games and 15 starts. On December 30, 2013, the Cleveland Browns fired head coach Rob Chudzinski after a season where the Browns finished with a 4-12 record. Skrine earned an overall grade of -12.1 from Pro Football Focus in 2013.

==== 2014 ====
Skrine entered training camp slated as a backup after the Cleveland Browns drafted Justin Gilbert in the first round of the 2014 NFL draft. Head coach Mike Pettine opted to instead name Skrine the starting cornerback to begin the regular season, along with Joe Haden.

In Week 6, Skrine made three solo tackles, a season-high four pass deflections, and intercepted a pass by Ben Roethlisberger during a 31–10 victory against the Pittsburgh Steelers. The following week, he intercepted his second pass of the season during a 24–6 loss at the Jacksonville Jaguars in Week 7. On November 2, 2014, Skrine collected a season-high nine combined tackles in the Browns' 22–17 victory against the Tampa Bay Buccaneers in Week 9. In Week 10, he made three combined tackles, three pass deflections, and intercepted two passes by quarterback Andy Dalton during a 24–3 victory at the Cincinnati Bengals. He completed the 2014 season with 67 combined tackles (55 solo), a career-high 18 pass deflections, and a career-high four interceptions in 16 games and 16 starts. He earned an overall grade of -6.3 from Pro Football Focus in 2014.

Skrine became an unrestricted free agent in 2015 and garnered interest as a developing starting caliber cornerback. He decided to enter free agency and test the market instead of re-signing with the Cleveland Browns. It was reported that 15 teams inquired about signing Skrine, including the New York Giants, but were unable to meet Skrine's salary demands.

=== New York Jets ===
==== 2015 ====
On March 10, 2015, the New York Jets signed Skrine to a four-year, $25 million contract that includes $13 million guaranteed and a signing bonus of $5 million.

He entered training camp slated as the third cornerback on the depth chart and the Jets' first-team nickelback. Head coach Todd Bowles officially named him the third cornerback on the depth chart to start the regular season, behind Darrelle Revis and Antonio Cromartie. In Week 14, Skrine collected a season-high eight combined tackles, broke up a pass, and made an interception during a 30–8 victory against the Tennessee Titans. He finished the 2015 season with 56 combined tackles (46 solo), seven pass deflections, and an interception in 16 games and eight starts.

==== 2016 ====
Skrine became a starting cornerback to begin the regular season in 2016 after the Jets chose not to re-sign Antonio Cromartie. On October 2, 2016, Skrine collected four combined tackles and sacked quarterback Russell Wilson during a 27–17 loss to the Seattle Seahawks in Week 4. On October 23, 2016, Skrine recorded a season-high six combined tackles, deflected a pass, and returned an interception by Joe Flacco for a 51-yard gain in the Jets' 24–16 win against the Baltimore Ravens in Week 7. Skrine injured his knee and was inactive for the Jets' Week 8 victory at the Cleveland Browns. His injury ended his 87-game streak and was the first time he missed a game during his career. He went on to also miss the Jets' Week 15 loss to the Miami Dolphins after he sustained a concussion the previous week. He finished the season with 47 combined tackles (39 solo), six passes defensed, an interception, and a sack in 14 games and 14 starts. Pro Football Focus gave Skrine an overall grade of 45.5, which ranked 89th among all qualifying cornerbacks in 2016.

==== 2017 ====
Defensive coordinator Kacy Rodgers retained Skrine as the starting cornerback to begin the regular season, alongside Morris Claiborne, after the Jets released Darrelle Revis. In Week 3, Skrine collected a season-high eight solo tackles and sacked quarterback Jay Cutler in the Jets' 20–6 win against the Miami Dolphins. On October 15, 2017, Skrine made two solo tackles, a season-high three pass deflections, and intercepted a pass by Tom Brady in a 24–17 loss to the New England Patriots. He was inactive for the Jets' Week 8 loss to the Atlanta Falcons after sustaining a concussion. He finished the season with 63 combined tackles (56 solo), nine passes defensed, an interception, and a sack in 15 games and 15 starts. Pro Football Focus gave Skrine an overall grade 65.7, which ranked 85th among all qualifying cornerbacks in 2017.

==== 2018 ====
Skrine finished the 2018 season with 58 tackles, 8 passes defended, and half a sack in 14 games and 11 starts. He received an overall grade of 57.3 from Pro Football Focus in 2018, which ranked as the 103rd highest grade among all qualifying cornerbacks.

=== Chicago Bears ===
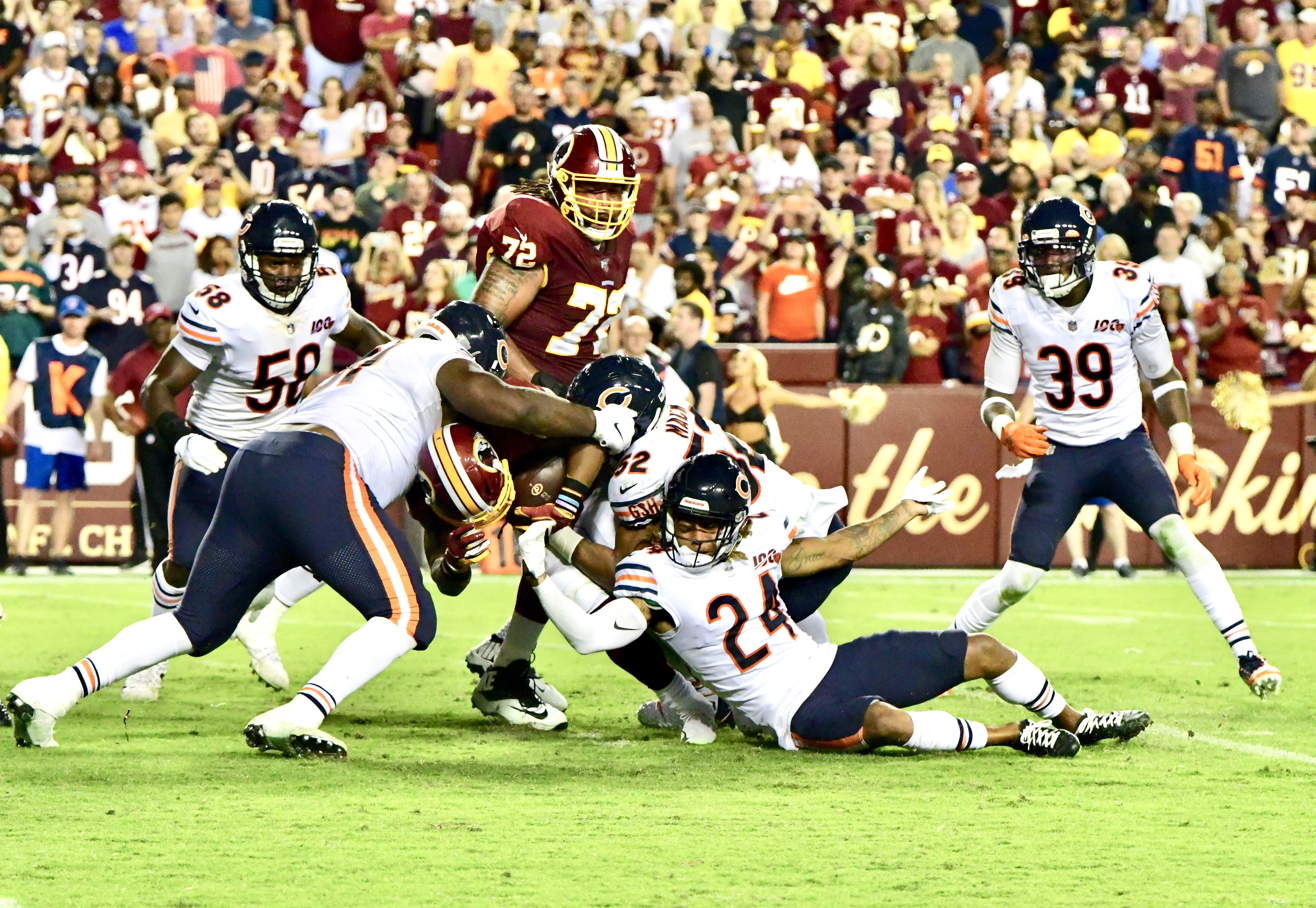
Skrine in a game against the Washington Redskins

On March 13, 2019, Skrine signed a three-year, $16.6 million contract with the Chicago Bears.

Skrine was released on March 17, 2021.

=== San Francisco 49ers ===
On September 29, 2021, Skrine signed with the San Francisco 49ers. The 49ers released him on October 11, 2021.

=== Tennessee Titans ===
Skrine signed with the Tennessee Titans on November 23, 2021. In Week 14 Skrine had 4 tackles and also intercepted Trevor Lawrence in a 20-0 win over the Jacksonville Jaguars.

On March 18, 2022, Skrine re-signed with the Titans.

On July 26, 2022, Skrine announced his retirement from the NFL.

== NFL career statistics ==
Legend
**Bold**	Career high

=== Regular season ===
Year	Team	Games		Tackles					Interceptions					Fumbles			
Year	Team	GP	GS	Cmb	Solo	Ast	Sck	TFL	Int	Yds	TD	Lng	PD	FF	FR	Yds	TD
2011	CLE	**16**	0	18	14	4	0.0	0	1	5	0	5	2	0	0	0	0
2012	CLE	**16**	6	**85**	**72**	13	0.0	3	0	0	0	0	10	0	1	0	0
2013	CLE	**16**	15	65	55	10	**1.0**	2	1	5	0	5	17	0	0	0	0
2014	CLE	**16**	**16**	67	55	12	0.0	0	**4**	34	0	30	**18**	0	0	0	0
2015	NYJ	**16**	8	56	46	10	0.0	2	1	9	0	9	7	0	0	0	0
2016	NYJ	14	14	47	39	8	**1.0**	1	1	**51**	0	**51**	6	0	0	0	0
2017	NYJ	15	15	63	56	7	**1.0**	2	1	0	0	0	9	**2**	**2**	**8**	0
2018	NYJ	14	11	58	52	6	0.5	**4**	0	0	0	0	8	1	1	0	0
2019	CHI	**16**	4	48	39	9	0.0	1	0	0	0	0	5	**2**	0	0	0
2020	CHI	12	3	66	52	**14**	0.0	1	0	0	0	0	3	1	0	0	0
2021	SFO	1	0	0	0	0	0.0	0	0	0	0	0	0	0	0	0	0
2021	TEN	6	3	17	11	6	0.0	0	1	17	0	17	3	0	0	0	0
		158	95	590	491	99	3.5	16	10	121	0	51	88	6	4	8	0

=== Playoffs ===
Year	Team	Games		Tackles					Interceptions					Fumbles			
Year	Team	GP	GS	Cmb	Solo	Ast	Sck	TFL	Int	Yds	TD	Lng	PD	FF	FR	Yds	TD
2021	TEN	**1**	0	**1**	**1**	0	0.0	0	0	0	0	0	0	0	0	0	0
		1	0	1	1	0	0.0	0	0	0	0	0	0	0	0	0	0

== Personal life ==
Skrine was given the nickname "Buster" from his grandmother because his father also shares the same first name. Skrine began teaching high-intensity interval training classes during the 2017 offseason out of the Kore studio located in New York City's Meatpacking District.

=== Legal issues ===
Skrine was arrested on August 9, 2023 in Canada for bank fraud-related charges. He allegedly created accounts at multiple banks in Durham Region and used fraudulent checks to withdraw over $100,000 in cash. Durham Region Police said the alleged scheme started in September 2022 and was still being executed at the time of his arrest. Skrine was arrested at Toronto Pearson International Airport after he had made travel arrangements to return to the United States. He is facing 15 charges to include "fraud and possession of property obtained by crime."
