= Shawn Mennenga =

American football player and coach (born 1971)

Personal information
- Born: January 8, 1971 (age 55); Melbourne, Iowa, U.S.

Career information
- High school: West Marshall (State Center, Iowa)
- College: Missouri

Career history
- Southwest Baptist (1994) Graduate assistant; Southwest Baptist (1995–1996) Secondary coach; Western Kentucky (1997) Outside linebackers coach; Hutchinson Community College (1998–2000) Defensive coordinator; Culver–Stockton (2001) Defensive coordinator; Culver–Stockton (2002–2004) Head coach; Fort Hayes State (2005–2008) Defensive coordinator; South Dakota State (2009–2010) Linebackers coach; Cleveland Browns (2011–2017) Assistant special teams coach; Vanderbilt (2018) Special teams coordinator; Green Bay Packers (2019–2020) Special teams coordinator

Shawn Mennenga (born January 8, 1971) is an American football coach. He was the special teams coordinator for the Green Bay Packers of the National Football League from 2019 to 2020. since 2019. After beginning his NFL coaching career with the Cleveland Browns in 2011 under Pat Shurmur after years of college coaching experience. During 2018 Shawn became the special teams coordinator for Vanderbilt before ultimately returning to the NFL.

== Playing career ==
Mennenga lettered one season as a defensive back at the University of Missouri in 1992.

== Coaching career ==
=== College coaching ===
Shawn began coaching in the college ranks Mennenga also coached in the collegiate ranks at Southwest Baptist University, first as a graduate assistant in 1994 and then coaching the team's secondary from 1995 to 1996. This was followed by Shawn coaching the 1997 season as the outside linebackers coach for Western Kentucky University. He followed this by spending 3 years as the defensive coordinator at Hutchinson Community College in Kansas. He followed this by becoming the defensive coordinator at Culver-Stockton College for the 2001 season. Following the season he received a promotion to become the head coach of the team a position he would hold until 2004. After his head coaching sting Shawn would spend four years at Fort Hays State University as the team's defensive coordinator. Mennenga spent the 2009–2010 seasons as the linebackers coach at South Dakota State, he helped the defensive improve and lead the team to their first-ever appearance in the Football Championship Subdivision playoffs.

==== Return to college ====
In 2018Shawn returned to college becoming the special teams coordinator at Vanderbilt. He helped punter Parker Thome rank 4th in the Southeastern Conference with an average of 44.9 yards per punt on 51 punts, including 14 punts of 50-plus yards and 19 inside the 20-yard line. Thome's average was tied for the fourth best in a season in school history, and he set a single-game school record by averaging 55.3 yards on three punts in Vanderbilt's win vs. Tennessee.

=== NFL coaching ===
==== Cleveland Browns ====
In 2011, Mennenga made the jump to the NFL and served as the special teams assistant for the Cleveland Browns under Pat Shurmur, a position he would hold for seven seasons (2011–2017). During this time, Mennenga helped the Browns rank No. 7 in the NFL over that span in punt return with an average of 9.9 yards and opponent kickoff return average 21.8 yards. In addition the Browns were the only team in the AFC to earn at least one AFC Special Teams Player of the Week award each season from 2011 to 2016, picking up seven awards over that span of time.

==== Green Bay Packers ====
Shawn Mennenga returned to the NFL in 2019 becoming the Green Bay Packers special teams coordinator under first year head coach Matt LaFleur. Mennenga was fired on January 29, 2021.

== Head coaching record ==
Year	Team	Overall	Conference	Standing	Bowl/playoffs
Culver–Stockton Wildcats (Heart of America Athletic Conference) (2002–2004)
2002	Culver–Stockton	4–7	4–6	T–6th	
2003	Culver–Stockton	4–6	4–6	T–7th	
2004	Culver–Stockton	2–8	2–8	T–10th	
Culver–Stockton:		10–21	10–20		
Total:		10–21			

== Family ==
Mennenga and his wife, Christie, have a son, Garrett, and a daughter, Ashley.
