= Jabaal Sheard =

American football player (born 1989)

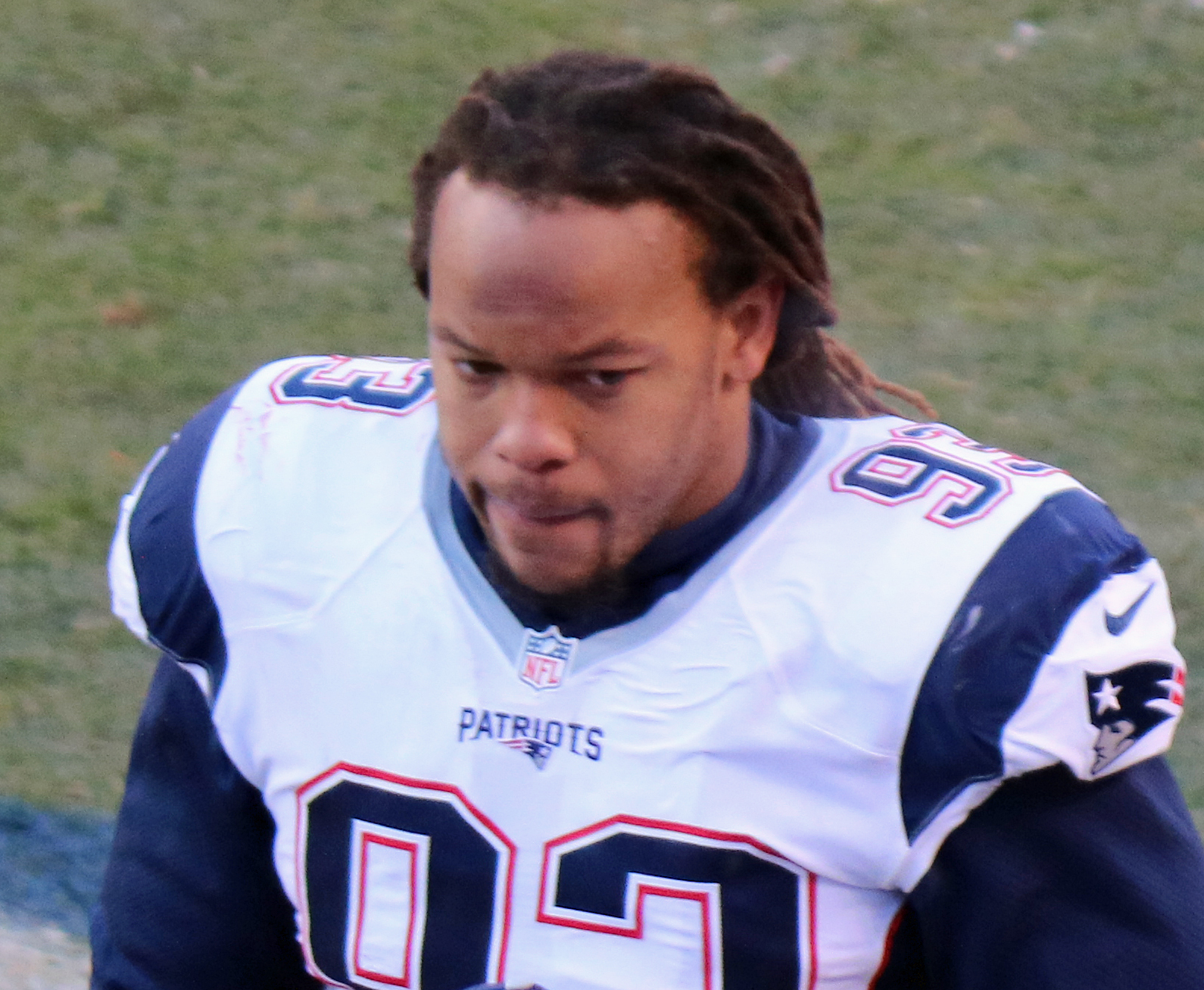
- Sheard with the New England Patriots in 2016

No. 97, 93, 98, 91
- Position: Defensive end

Personal information
- Born: May 10, 1989 (age 37); Hollywood, Florida, U.S.
- Listed height: 6 ft 3 in (1.91 m)
- Listed weight: 268 lb (122 kg)

Career information
- High school: Hollywood Hills (Hollywood, Florida)
- College: Pittsburgh (2007–2010)
- NFL draft: 2011: 2nd round, 37th overall pick

Career history
- Cleveland Browns (2011–2014); New England Patriots (2015–2016); Indianapolis Colts (2017–2019); Jacksonville Jaguars (2020); New York Giants (2020); Miami Dolphins (2021)

Awards and highlights
- Super Bowl champion (LI); PFWA All-Rookie Team (2011); First-team All-American (2010); Big East Defensive Player of the Year (2010); First-team All-Big East (2010)

Career NFL statistics
- Total tackles: 407
- Sacks: 53.0
- Forced fumbles: 14
- Fumble recoveries: 2
- Stats at Pro Football Reference

Jabaal Lamar Sheard (born May 10, 1989) is an American former professional football player who was a defensive end in the National Football League (NFL). He played college football for the University of Pittsburgh, and was selected by the Cleveland Browns in the second round of the 2011 NFL draft. He also played for the New England Patriots, with whom he won Super Bowl LI.

== Early life ==
Sheard was an All-Broward County defensive lineman who had 54 tackles and 11 sacks as a senior at Hollywood Hills, a Florida 5A (second largest classification) school. He was rated as the nation's No. 23 weakside defensive end and was one of the top 60 prospects in the state of Florida according to Rivals.com. He was a PrepStar All-Southeast Region.He was rated one of the top 100 prospects in Florida by SuperPrep. He was rated one of the top 75 prospects in the southeast region by Scout.com.

Sheard was also a track and field letterman. In 2007, he placed fourth in the shot put at the FHSAA Outdoor State Championships with a throw of 16.20 meters (53-0). He also earned All-Broward County honors in the discus. He was timed at 4.6 in the 40-yard dash at the Nike combine prior to his senior season.

== College career ==
Sheard was described as someone who didn't get enough credit on the Pittsburgh defensive line and noted for his "extraordinary game" against Notre Dame and the pressure he put on quarterback Jimmy Clausen. He had four tackles, two tackles for loss, one sack, one pass breakup and four quarterback hurries in the game, as he "simply overwhelmed right tackle Sam Young off the edge with his speed". Commentator Wes Bunting describes Sheard, a 6–4, 260-pound lineman, as being balanced and exhibiting impressive body control, "an explosive first step", and "keeping his pad level down and making himself small when turning the corner". As a junior in 2009 Sheard was overshadowed by teammate and fellow defensive lineman Greg Romeus, but "is a gifted pass rusher in his own right, and his combination of burst, balance and closing speed will find him a spot on an NFL roster". Dave Wannstedt, Pittsburgh's coach and a former National Football League (NFL) coach has also said that he thinks Sheard and Romeus will both play in the NFL.

Teammate Brandon Lindsey, who believes Romeus and Sheard, credited them with helping him develop as a player saying, "They’ve really shown me how to work hard every day in practice and to not get frustrated when things don’t go your way." The Panthers lead the country in sacks.

Sheard was suspended from the Pitt Football team indefinitely after his July 18, 2010 arrest on charges stemming from an off-campus brawl that occurred on East Carson Street in Pittsburgh. He was restored to the team after charges were reduced to a misdemeanor disorderly conduct, and paid restitution for injuries and damages incurred during the fight.

Sheard earned first-team American Football Coaches Association All-American honors in 2010 and was named as one of six finalists for the Ted Hendricks Award for the years best defensive end.

== Professional career ==
Pre-draft measurables
Height	Weight	Arm length	Hand span	Wingspan	40-yard dash	10-yard split	20-yard split	20-yard shuttle	Three-cone drill	Vertical jump	Broad jump
6 ft 2 7/8 in (1.90 m)	264 lb (120 kg)	33 1/2 in (0.85 m)	10 in (0.25 m)	6 ft 7 in (2.01 m)	4.73 s	1.68 s	2.77 s	4.65 s	7.34 s	32.0 in (0.81 m)	9 ft 7 in (2.92 m)
All values from NFL Combine/Pro Day

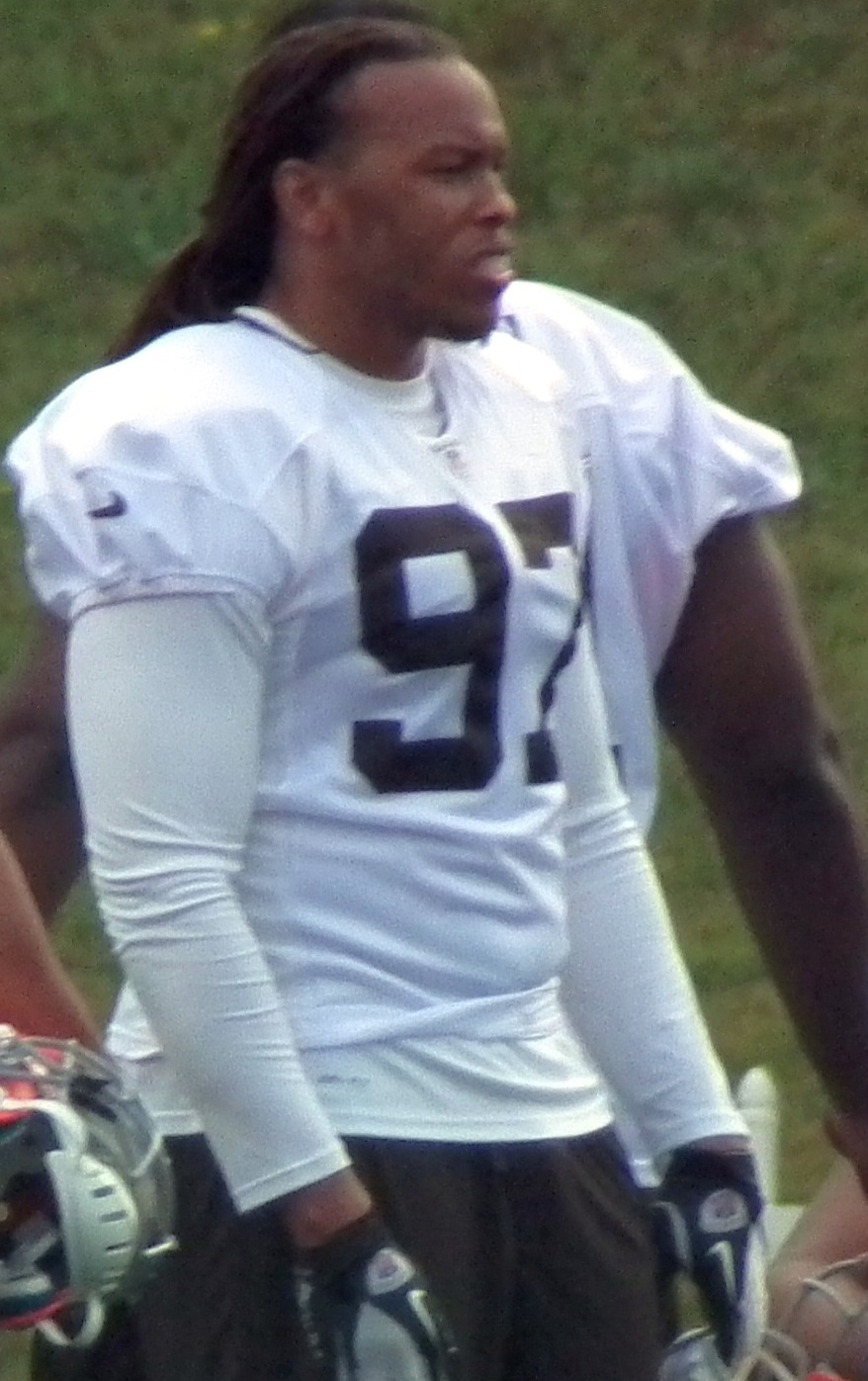
Sheard with the Browns in 2012

=== Cleveland Browns ===
Sheard was selected with the 37th overall pick in the second round of the 2011 NFL draft by the Cleveland Browns.

In 2011, Sheard started all 16 games for the Browns and led the team in sacks (8.5) and forced fumbles (5). Sheard and teammate Phil Taylor were chosen to the Pro Football Weekly 2011 All-Rookie Team. Sheard recorded his first career sack and forced fumble against the Indianapolis Colts in week 2 and recorded a career-high 2 sacks against the Arizona Cardinals in week 15.

In 2012, Sheard started all 16 games for the Browns, recording 7.0 sacks and 36 tackles to cap a productive year.

Limited by injury, Sheard started 13 games in 2013. He recorded 5.5 sacks and 19 tackles.

Sheard improved in 2014 under a new coaching staff led by head coach Mike Pettine. During the 2014 season, he started all 16 games and ended the year on a solid note with 44 combined tackles (25 solo, 19 assisted) and 2 sacks.

=== New England Patriots ===
As a free agent, Sheard signed a two-year, $11 million contract with the New England Patriots on March 11, 2015. He made an immediate impact on the Patriots' defense, collecting four sacks in his first four games. He finished the season with 37 tackles, 8 sacks, and two passes defensed.

After Chandler Jones was traded to the Arizona Cardinals during the offseason, Sheard was expected to fill his starting role on the defensive line. In Week 3, he sacked Brock Osweiler twice in a 27-0 shutout win against the Texans. On February 5, 2017, Sheard was part of the Patriots team that won Super Bowl LI. In the game, he recorded two tackles and 0.5 sacks as the Patriots defeated the Atlanta Falcons by a score of 34–28 in overtime. The Patriots trailed 28–3 in the third quarter and rallied back to win the game, which featured the first overtime game in Super Bowl history.

=== Indianapolis Colts ===
On March 10, 2017, Sheard signed a three-year, $25.5 million deal with the Indianapolis Colts. Sheard was switched to an OLB due to the Colts' 3-4 scheme. He again made an immediate impact on the Colts' defense, collecting 5.5 sacks and 52 tackles over the course of the 2017 season.

After the 2017 season, the Colts fired Chuck Pagano and hired Frank Reich. The Colts then returned to a 4-3 defense and Sheard was moved back to defensive end.

=== Jacksonville Jaguars ===
On October 12, 2020, Sheard was signed to the Jacksonville Jaguars' practice squad. He was elevated to the active roster on October 17 for the team's week 6 game against the Detroit Lions, and reverted to the practice squad after the game.

=== New York Giants ===
On October 20, 2020, Sheard was signed by the New York Giants off the Jaguars practice squad. In Week 12 against the Cincinnati Bengals, Sheard secured a 19–17 Giants victory by stripping Bengals backup quarterback Brandon Allen on the 50 yard line late in the fourth quarter, very close to field-goal range for kicker Randy Bullock.

=== Miami Dolphins ===
On September 1, 2021, Sheard was signed to the Miami Dolphins practice squad. He was released on November 16.

=== NFL statistics ===
Year	Team	GP	COMB	TOTAL	AST	SACK	FF	FR	FR YDS	INT	IR YDS	AVG IR	LNG	TD	PD
2011	CLE	16	55	40	15	8.5	5	1	5	0	0	0	0	0	2
2012	CLE	16	55	38	17	7.0	1	0	0	0	0	0	0	0	3
2013	CLE	13	36	19	17	5.5	1	1	0	0	0	0	0	0	4
2014	CLE	16	44	25	19	2.0	0	0	0	0	0	0	0	0	3
2015	NE	13	37	28	9	8.0	4	0	0	0	0	0	0	0	2
2016	NE	15	33	20	13	5.0	0	0	0	0	0	0	0	0	4
2017	IND	16	52	37	15	5.5	2	0	0	0	0	0	0	0	3
2018	IND	16	50	27	13	5.5	0	1	0	0	0	0	0	0	4
2019	IND	13	25	20	5	4.5	0	0	0	0	0	0	0	0	0
2020	JAX NYG	10	19	10	9	1.5	1	0	0	0	0	0	0	0	1
Career		144	406	274	132	53.0	14	3	0	0	0	0	0	0	28
