= Evan Moore =

American football player and sportscaster

No. 89, 82, 86
- Position: Tight end

Personal information
- Born: January 3, 1985 (age 41); Brea, California, U.S.
- Listed height: 6 ft 6 in (1.98 m)
- Listed weight: 250 lb (113 kg)

Career information
- High school: Brea Olinda
- College: Stanford (2003–2007)
- NFL draft: 2008: undrafted

Career history
- New Orleans Saints (2008)*; Green Bay Packers (2008); Cleveland Browns (2009–2011); Seattle Seahawks (2012); Philadelphia Eagles (2012)
- * Offseason or practice squad member only

Career NFL statistics
- Receptions: 63
- Receiving yards: 810
- Receiving touchdowns: 5
- Stats at Pro Football Reference

Evan James Moore (born January 3, 1985) is an American football analyst and former player. He played professionally as a tight end in the National Football League (NFL).

Moore played college football and college basketball for the Stanford. He was signed by the Green Bay Packers as an undrafted free agent in 2008. He became a college football analyst at Pac-12 Network and FOX Sports.

== Early life ==
Moore attended Brea Olinda High School in Orange County, California and was an All-American in both football and basketball. He led his basketball team with 24.5 points per game and his football team with 13 touchdowns his senior year. He was named the "Orange County Athlete of the Year" for his performance in the athletic arena. Other notable recipients of this award include Tony Gonzalez (Atlanta Falcons) and DeShaun Foster (Carolina Panthers). His high school career propelled him into a position to play both football and basketball on a full scholarship at Stanford University. He chose Stanford over USC and UCLA.

== College career ==
At Stanford, Moore was the starting wide receiver for 3 years. He had a breakout sophomore season, leading his team in touchdown receptions. The following year (his junior season) he suffered a serious injury, a dislocated hip, which sidelined him for the entire season. He was able to receive a medical redshirt for his junior season. At Stanford, Moore graduated with a bachelor's degree in Political Science and a master's degree in Business and Organizational Behavior.

Moore also played basketball for two years at Stanford University.

== Professional career ==
=== Green Bay Packers ===
Moore went undrafted in the 2008 NFL Draft. He was first signed with the New Orleans Saints, later being cut by head coach Sean Payton during training camp. On May 22, 2008 Moore signed with the Green Bay Packers. He was placed on the injured reserve list after sustaining a knee injury in a game against the San Francisco 49ers.

=== Cleveland Browns ===
Moore was signed to the Cleveland Browns practice squad on November 9, 2009 once he recovered from a broken hand suffered in training camp with the Green Bay Packers. He was promoted to the active roster December 5. In Moore's NFL debut against the San Diego Chargers, he caught 6 passes for 80 yards and was the team's leading receiver on the day. After playing in only 5 regular season games with the Cleveland Browns in 2009, Moore led all tight ends in receptions and yards on the season and was among the team's top receiving targets. He followed this up with a solid 2010 season, leading the Browns with just over 22 yards per reception. Following this 2010 season, Moore signed a 3-year deal reportedly worth just over $3 million per year. In 2011, Moore led the Browns in touchdown receptions, and was once again one of the team's leading receiving targets. He was released by the Browns on August 31, 2012.

=== Seattle Seahawks ===
Moore signed with the Seattle Seahawks on September 1, 2012 to an undisclosed contract. He was released December 19, 2012.

=== Philadelphia Eagles ===
On December 20, 2012, the day after being released by the Seahawks, Moore was signed by the Philadelphia Eagles. He was released on April 29, 2013 after not meeting statistical expectations by the club, and soon after undergoing surgery for a back injury.

== NFL career statistics ==
Year	Team	GP	Receiving						Fumbles	
Year	Team	GP	Rec	Yds	Avg	Lng	TD	FD	Fum	Lost
2009	CLE	5	12	158	13.2	24	0	8	0	0
2010	CLE	12	16	322	20.1	49	1	11	1	1
2011	CLE	16	34	324	9.5	33	4	19	0	0
2012	SEA	14	1	6	6.0	6	0	0	0	0
2012	PHI	1	0	0	0.0	0	0	0	0	0
Total		48	63	810	12.9	49	5	38	1	1

== Post-football career ==
Moore appeared on Sky Sports Network in London during the 2014-2015 NFL playoffs as a TV analyst. Shortly after, he appeared as a studio analyst for NBC's Pro Football Talk. In the fall of 2015, Moore made his FOX debut as a color commentator for the Oregon St. vs Oregon college football game. He recently called the game ranked as the 30th best of the 2018-19 season, BYU at Utah.

== Personal life ==
Evan is married to Colby Moore, a former UCLA volleyball player. Moore's sister is Tori Foles, wife of Nick Foles. His brother-in-law, Chase Lyman, played WR at the University of California and the New Orleans Saints.
