= Phil Taylor (American football) =

American football player (born 1988)

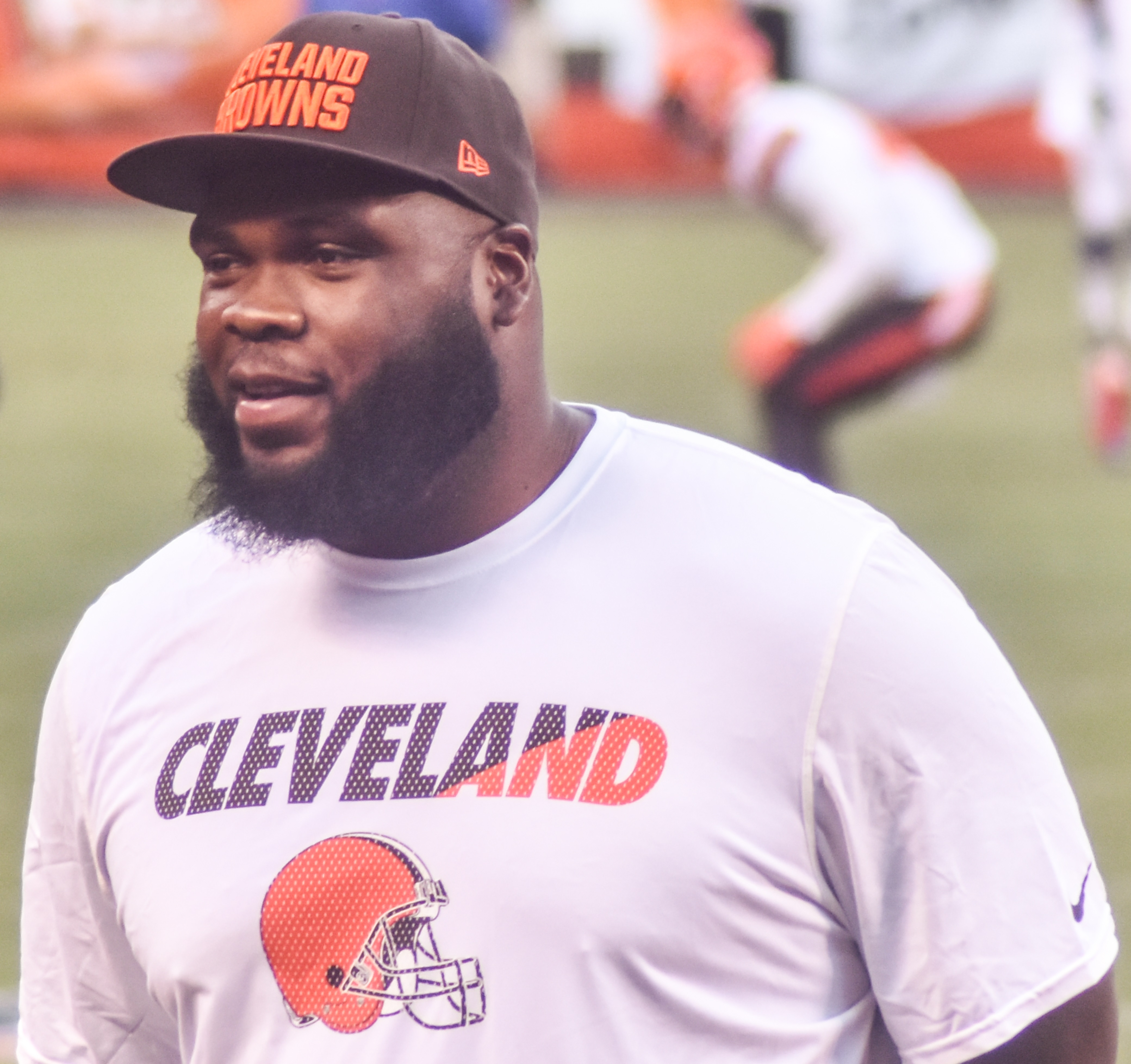
- Taylor with the Cleveland Browns in 2015

No. 98, 97, 99
- Position: Nose tackle

Personal information
- Born: April 7, 1988 (age 38); Clinton, Maryland, U.S.
- Listed height: 6 ft 3 in (1.91 m)
- Listed weight: 320 lb (145 kg)

Career information
- High school: Gwynn Park (Brandywine, Maryland)
- College: Penn State (2006–2007); Baylor (2008–2010)
- NFL draft: 2011: 1st round, 21st overall pick

Career history
- Cleveland Browns (2011–2014); Denver Broncos (2016)*; Washington Redskins (2017)
- * Offseason or practice squad member only

Awards and highlights
- PFWA All-Rookie Team (2011)

Career NFL statistics
- Total tackles: 109
- Sacks: 7.0
- Forced fumbles: 1
- Fumble recoveries: 1
- Stats at Pro Football Reference

Phillip Eugene Taylor Sr. (born April 7, 1988) is an American former professional football player who was a nose tackle in the National Football League (NFL). He was selected in the first round of the 2011 NFL draft by the Cleveland Browns. He played college football for the Penn State Nittany Lions and Baylor Bears.

== Early life ==
A native of Clinton, Maryland, Taylor attended Gwynn Park High School, where he was a two-way lineman for head coach Dan Hayes. In his junior year, he was credited with 30 pancake blocks along offensive line. As a senior, he registered 77 tackles with 10 sacks, earning first-team all-state and Washington Post first-team all-metro honors.

Regarded as a four-star recruit by Rivals.com, Taylor was ranked as the No. 11 defensive tackle in the nation, in a class highlighted by Gerald McCoy and Al Woods. Taylor took official visits to Maryland and Penn State only, despite also holding offers by Florida, Ohio State, and Virginia Tech, among others. In January 2006, Taylor committed to Penn State.

== College career ==
After sitting out the first half of his true freshman year at Penn State, Taylor made his collegiate debut against Michigan and went on to play the season's final seven games for the Nittany Lions. In his sophomore year, he sustained a knee injury during preseason drills but still managed to play 12 games on the season, starting the Nittany Lions' final five games. He was credited with 20 tackles, 12 solo efforts, with 6.5 tackles for loss resulting in loss of 26 yards. He also tallied 3.0 sacks, good for loss of 18 yards, and recovered two fumbles. His finale game for Penn State came at the Alamo Bowl against Texas A&M with five-tackle performance that included one tackle for loss.

In October 2007, Taylor was among several Nittany Lions involved in a brawl during a fraternity party at HUB–Robeson Center. He pleaded guilty to a disorderly conduct misdemeanor, and was put on probation by Joe Paterno. In the summer of 2008, Taylor and Chris Baker were involved in a minor pool party fracas, which resulted in both being ejected from the team. Taylor eventually transferred to Baylor in September 2008 and sat out the season in compliance with NCAA Division I transfer policy.

As a junior in 2009, Taylor earned his first Baylor letter, playing all 12 games and started nine. For the season, he totaled 25 tackles (2.5 for loss), an assisted sack, five QB hurries, two blocked kicks and one interception, despite battling a “turf toe” injury through the middle portion of the season. In May 2010, Taylor spent two weeks in Nairobi on a sports mission trip to Kenya with other Baylor athletes. He entered his senior year having shed almost 30 pounds, and started all 13 games at nose guard. He totaled 62 tackles (35 solo)—the most by a Baylor interior lineman since Ethan Kelley in 2002—, seven for loss including two sacks, three QB hurries, two pass breakups and one forced fumble. In his final college career game, the Texas Bowl against Illinois, Taylor had a career-high 10 tackles.

== Professional career ==
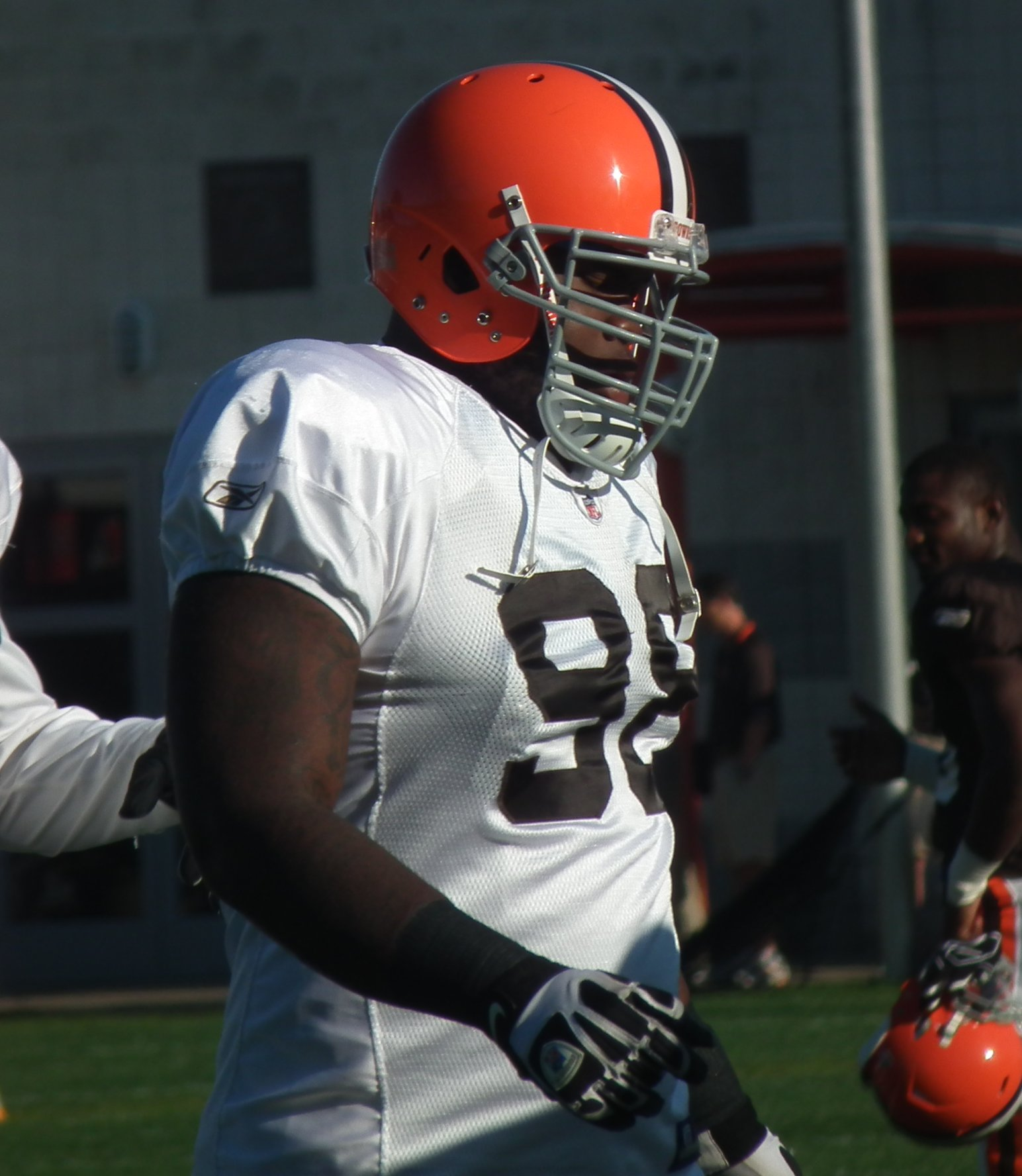
Taylor with the Browns in 2011

=== Pre-draft ===
For his physical abilities, Taylor was projected a safe first-round selection in the 2011 NFL draft.

Pre-draft measurables
Height	Weight	Arm length	Hand span	Wingspan	40-yard dash	10-yard split	20-yard split	20-yard shuttle	Three-cone drill	Vertical jump	Broad jump	Bench press
6 ft 3 1/4 in (1.91 m)	334 lb (151 kg)	34 in (0.86 m)	10 3/4 in (0.27 m)	6 ft 9 5/8 in (2.07 m)	5.21 s	1.83 s	3.01 s	4.77 s	7.75 s	29.5 in (0.75 m)	8 ft 4 in (2.54 m)	31 reps
All values from 2011 NFL Scouting Combine

=== Cleveland Browns ===
Taylor was selected 21st overall by the Cleveland Browns. Taylor was the highest-selected Baylor defensive tackle since Daryl Gardener in 1996. After a four-day holdout, Taylor signed a four-year contract worth $8.1 million. During his rookie season, Taylor started every game and finished the season with 59 tackles, 4 sacks, and a forced fumble. Taylor was a major standout in his rookie season, outperforming higher picks of the same position such as Nick Fairley and Corey Liuget.

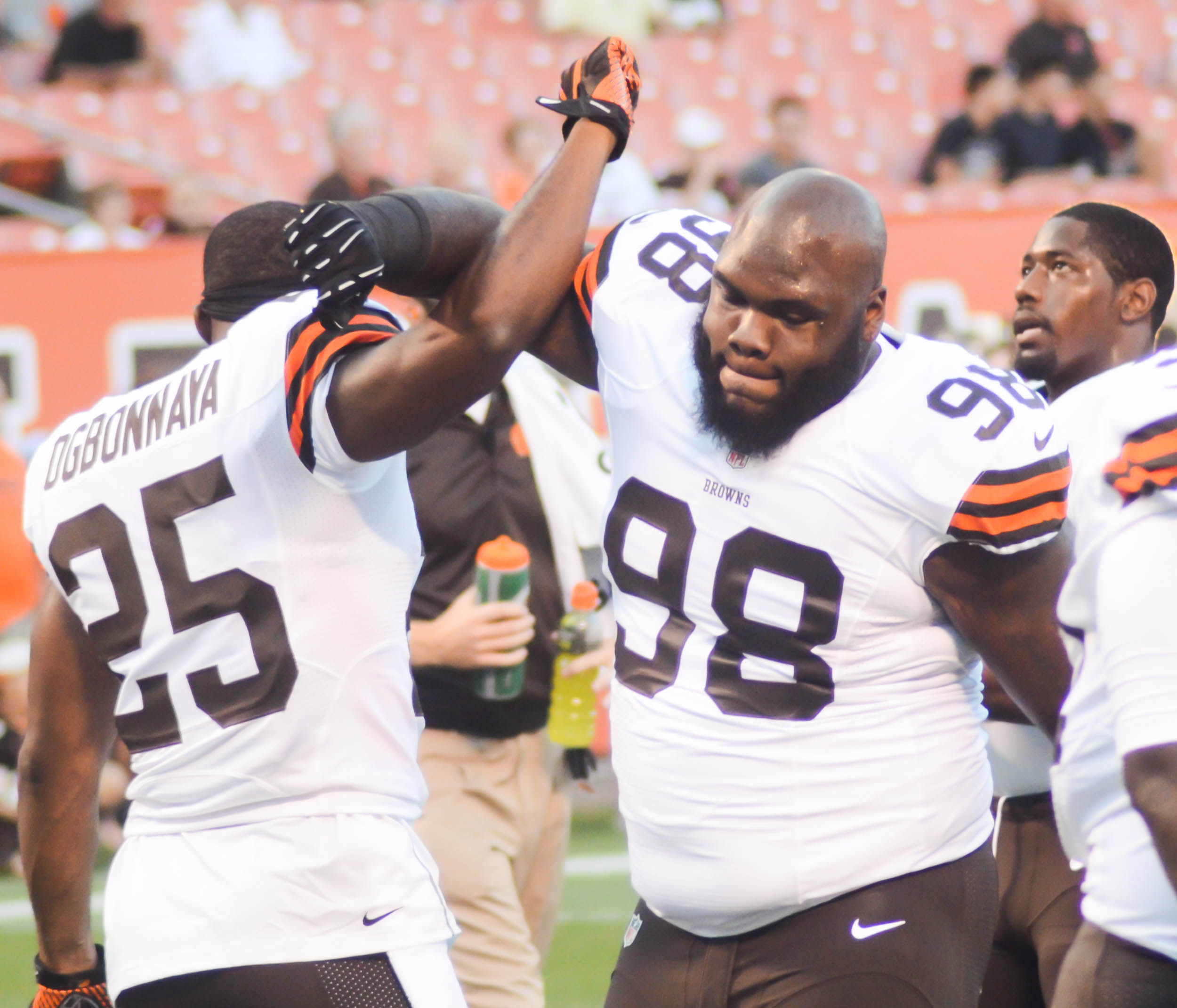
Taylor (right) and Chris Ogbonnaya in 2014

Taylor was also selected to the Pro Football Weekly All-Rookie team of 2011, with teammate Jabaal Sheard.

On September 1, 2015, the Browns released Taylor.

Taylor started 42 games for the Cleveland Browns, posting seven sacks and 69 tackles.

=== Denver Broncos ===
On February 22, 2016, Taylor signed with the Denver Broncos. On July 31, 2016, Taylor was placed on Injured reserve due to a knee injury suffered in training camp. He was released on August 10, 2016.

=== Washington Redskins ===
On January 6, 2017, Taylor signed a one-year contract with the Washington Redskins. In the Redskins' third preseason game, Taylor suffered a torn quad that would keep him out for the entire 2017 season. He was officially place on injured reserve on September 2, 2017.

On April 3, 2018, Taylor re-signed with the Redskins. He was released prior to the 2018 regular season on September 1.

On March 13, 2019, Taylor announced his retirement from the NFL.

=== NFL statistics ===
Year	Team	GP	COMB	TOTAL	AST	SACK	FF	FR	FR YDS	INT	YDS	AVG	LNG	TD	PD
2011	CLE	16	59	37	22	4.0	1	0	0	0	0	0	0	0	1
2012	CLE	8	14	12	2	1.0	0	1	0	0	0	0	0	0	0
2013	CLE	15	26	14	12	2.0	0	0	0	0	0	0	0	0	1
2014	CLE	5	10	6	4	0.0	0	0	0	0	0	0	0	0	1
Career		44	109	69	40	7.0	1	1	0	0	0	0	0	0	3
