= Armond Smith =

American gridiron football player (born 1986)

No. 35, 36
- Position: Running back

Personal information
- Born: May 7, 1986 (age 40); Los Angeles, California, U.S.
- Listed height: 5 ft 9 in (1.75 m)
- Listed weight: 194 lb (88 kg)

Career information
- High school: Stone Mountain (GA) Redan
- College: Union (KY)
- NFL draft: 2011: undrafted

Career history
- Cleveland Browns (2011); Carolina Panthers (2012–2013); Toronto Argonauts (2014)*
- * Offseason or practice squad member only

Career NFL statistics
- Rushing yards: 7
- Return yards: 131
- Stats at Pro Football Reference

Armond Smith (born May 7, 1986) is an American former professional football player who was a running back in the National Football League (NFL). He played college football for the Union Bulldogs.

== College football ==
Smith played college football at Union College in Barbourville, Kentucky.

== Professional football ==
=== Cleveland Browns ===
Smith was signed by the Cleveland Browns as an undrafted free agent in 2011. Smith was first noticed when he ran an 81-yard touchdown in the 2011 preseason against the Detroit Lions.

=== Carolina Panthers ===
Smith was ejected from a preseason game against the Baltimore Ravens on August 22, 2013 for the act of kicking second-string linebacker, Albert McClellan in the groin after the whistle.

=== Toronto Argonauts ===
On October 14, 2014, Smith signed a practice roster agreement with the Toronto Argonauts of the Canadian Football League. He was released by the Argonauts on November 11, 2014.
