= Troy Weatherhead =

American football player (born 1987)

Profile
- Position: Quarterback

Personal information
- Born: October 2, 1987 (age 39)
- Listed height: 6 ft 3 in (1.91 m)
- Listed weight: 215 lb (98 kg)

Career information
- High school: Comstock Park (Comstock Park, Michigan)
- College: Hillsdale (2006–2010)
- NFL draft: 2011: undrafted

Career history
- Cleveland Gladiators (2011); Cleveland Browns (2011)*
- * Offseason or practice squad member only

Awards and highlights
- GLIAC Football Player of the Year (2010)
- Stats at Pro Football Reference
- Stats at ArenaFan.com

Troy Weatherhead (born October 2, 1987) is an American former football quarterback. He played college football for the Hillsdale Chargers. He played professionally for the Cleveland Gladiators of the Arena Football League and was also a member of the Cleveland Browns of the National Football League (NFL).

== Early life ==
Troy Weatherhead was born on October 2, 1987. He played high school football at Comstock Park High School in Comstock Park, Michigan, earning Associated Press Class B first-team all-state honors his senior year in 2005 after throwing for 2,700 yards and 35 touchdowns.

== College career ==
Weatherhead played college football for the Division II Hillsdale Chargers. He redshirted in 2006 and was later a three-year starter. He set school records for completions with 795, passing yards with 9,144, and passing touchdowns with 63. Weatherhead also set NCAA records for single-season completion percentage with 76.9% and career completion percentage with 70.2%. He was named the GLIAC Football Player of the Year as a senior in 2010. He majored in marketing and management while at Hillsdale. Weatherhead was inducted into the school's athletics hall of fame in 2025.

== Professional career ==
Weatherhead was ranked the 41st best quarterback in the 2011 NFL draft by NFLDraftScout.com.

Weatherhead was assigned to the Cleveland Gladiators on June 29, 2011. He was a backup during his time with the Gladiators, completing ten of 14 passes (71.4%) for 178 yards, four touchdowns, and zero interceptions. He also rushed once for one yard.

Weatherhead signed with the Cleveland Browns on July 29, 2011. He was listed fourth on the team's depth chart at quarterback and did not play in any preseason games. He was waived on August 27, 2011, after the third preseason game.

== Personal life ==
Weatherhead later started a career in the medical sales industry.
