= Dominic Alford =

American gridiron football player (born 1988)

No. 60
- Position: Offensive lineman

Personal information
- Born: February 22, 1988 (age 38); Cleveland, Ohio, U.S.
- Listed height: 6 ft 3 in (1.91 m)
- Listed weight: 320 lb (145 kg)

Career information
- High school: Shaker Heights (OH)
- College: Minnesota
- NFL draft: 2011: undrafted

Career history
- Cleveland Browns (2011–2012)*; Carolina Panthers (2012)*; Cleveland Browns (2013)*; Cleveland Gladiators (2014)*; Hamilton Tiger-Cats (2014)
- * Offseason or practice squad member only
- Stats at Pro Football Reference
- Stats at ArenaFan.com

Dominic Alford (born February 22, 1988) is an American former football offensive lineman. He played college football for the Minnesota Golden Gophers.

== College career ==
He played college football at the University of Minnesota, where he played right guard and left guard.

== Professional career ==
=== Cleveland Browns (first stint) ===
On July 30, 2011, Alford was signed by Cleveland Browns as an undrafted free agent. On September 3, 2011, Alford was waived by the Cleveland Browns. He cleared waivers and was placed on the Browns' practice squad. On January 3, 2012, the Cleveland Browns signed Alford to a reserve/future contract. On August 31, 2012, he was waived by the Cleveland Browns.

=== Carolina Panthers ===
On December 4, 2012, the Carolina Panthers signed Alford to the practice squad.

=== Cleveland Browns (second stint) ===
On February 6, 2013, Alford was signed by the Browns. On July 24, 2013, Alford was cut by the Cleveland Browns. On August 3, 2013, the Cleveland Browns re-signed Alford.

=== Cleveland Gladiators ===
On February 3, 2014, Alford was assigned to the Cleveland Gladiators of the Arena Football League (AFL).

=== Hamilton Tiger-Cats ===
Alford signed a contract with the Hamilton Tiger-Cats on April 25, 2014. He played in two games, both starts, for the Tiger-Cats during the 2014 season. He was released by the Tiger-Cats on September 12, 2014.
