= Pat Shurmur =

American football player and coach (born 1965)

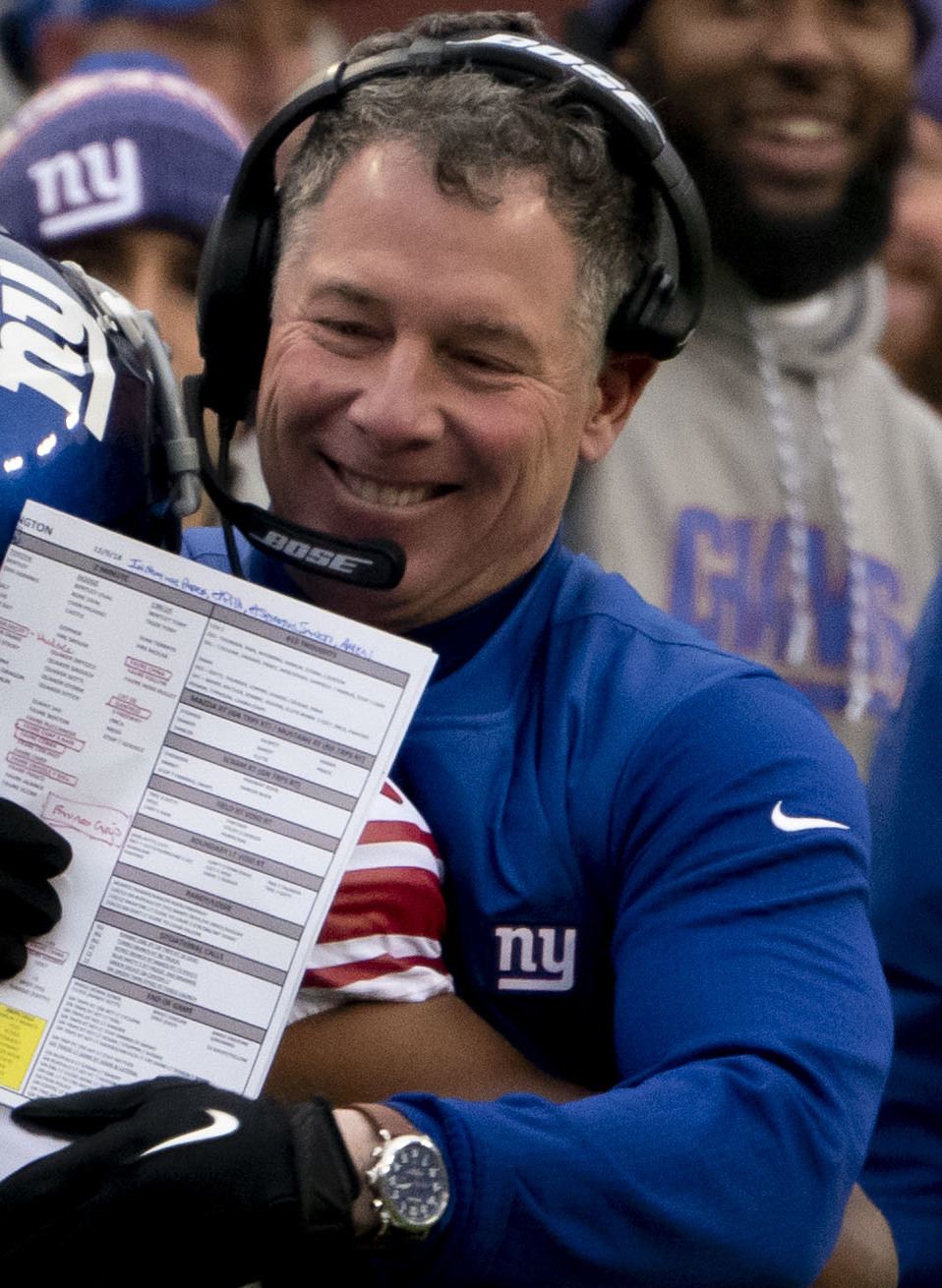
- Shurmur with the New York Giants in 2018

Personal information
- Born: April 14, 1965 (age 61); Dearborn, Michigan, U.S.

Career information
- High school: Divine Child (Dearborn, Michigan)
- College: Michigan State (1983–1987)
- NFL draft: 1988: undrafted

Career history
- Michigan State (1988–1989) Graduate assistant; Michigan State (1990–1997) Tight ends, offensive line & special teams coach; Stanford (1998) Offensive line coach; Philadelphia Eagles (1999–2001) Tight ends & offensive line coach; Philadelphia Eagles (2002–2008) Quarterbacks coach; St. Louis Rams (2009–2010) Offensive coordinator; Cleveland Browns (2011–2012) Head coach; Philadelphia Eagles (2013–2015) Offensive coordinator; Philadelphia Eagles (2015) Interim head coach; Minnesota Vikings (2016) Tight ends coach; Minnesota Vikings (2016) Interim offensive coordinator; Minnesota Vikings (2017) Offensive coordinator; New York Giants (2018–2019) Head coach; Denver Broncos (2020–2021) Offensive coordinator; Colorado (2023) Offensive analyst & co-offensive coordinator; Colorado (2024–2025) Offensive coordinator; Colorado (2025) Quarterbacks coach

Awards and highlights
- AP NFL Assistant Coach of the Year (2017); First-team All-Big Ten (1987)

Head coaching record
- Regular season: 19–46 (.292)
- Coaching profile at Pro Football Reference

Patrick Carl Shurmur (born April 14, 1965) is an American football coach. He was most recently the quarterbacks coach at the University of Colorado. Prior to joining the staff at Colorado, he was the offensive coordinator for the Denver Broncos of the National Football League (NFL) from 2020 to 2021. A 32-year coaching veteran, Shurmur has 21 seasons of NFL experience, including the last 11 years as a head coach or offensive coordinator. Shurmur has four years of experience as a head coach, working in that role with the New York Giants from 2018 to 2019 and with the Cleveland Browns from 2011 to 2012. He also served as interim head coach for Philadelphia Eagles at the end of the 2015 season. He has been an offensive coordinator for seven seasons, previously coaching in that role with the Minnesota Vikings (2016–2017), Philadelphia Eagles (2013–2015), and St. Louis Rams (2009–2010).

== Early life and playing career ==
Born in Dearborn Heights, Michigan, Shurmur comes from a football background. His uncle, Fritz Shurmur, was an NFL coach for 24 years, including a stint as defensive coordinator for the Green Bay Packers from 1994 to 1998, which included a victory in Super Bowl XXXI.

After graduating from Divine Child High School, Shurmur attended Michigan State University, where he was a four-year letterman for the Michigan State Spartans football team. He played guard and linebacker his freshman season, and started at center the next three seasons. He earned All-Big Ten Conference honors and also earned honorable mention All-America honors in 1987, his senior year (MG). He was co-captain when the Spartans defeated the USC Trojans in the Rose Bowl in his senior year. Shurmur was the first graduate student to play on the Michigan State football team, as he began studying for his master's degree in financial administration during his senior season.

== Coaching career ==
=== Philadelphia Eagles ===
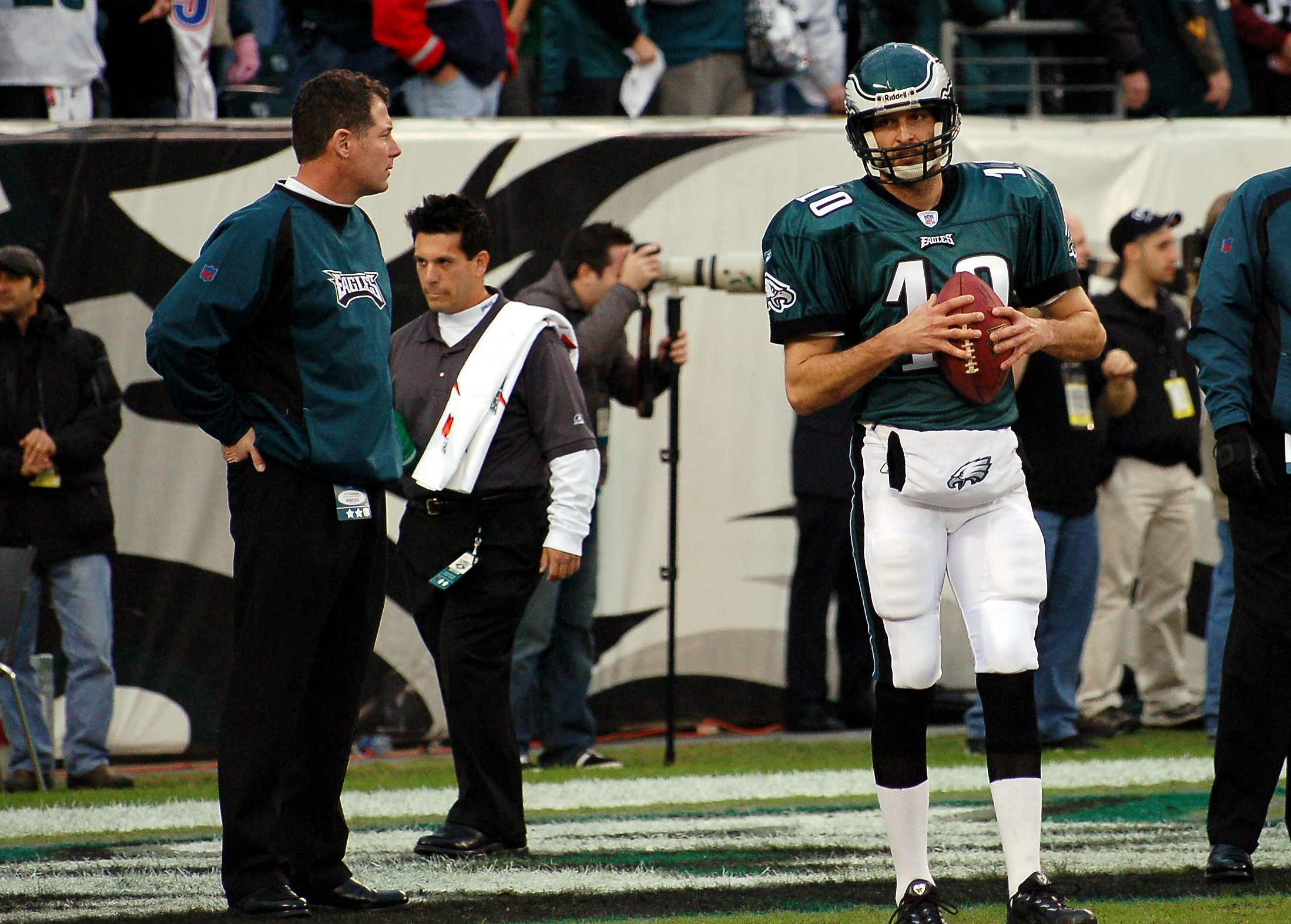
Shurmur as the Eagles quarterbacks coach in 2006 with Koy Detmer.

During Shurmur's NFL coaching career, he has been a part of eight playoff teams, winning six division crowns and appearing in the Super Bowl.

Shurmur began working for the Philadelphia Eagles in 1999, serving as both the tight ends coach and the offensive line coach. Shurmur helped mold tight end Chad Lewis into a three-time Pro Bowl selection.

In 2002, Shurmur was named the team's quarterback coach. In that role, Shurmur helped shape Donovan McNabb into the most prolific passer in Eagles history. McNabb holds nearly every Eagles career passing record, and in 2008, he set Eagles single-season records with 345 completions and 3,916 yards. In 2004, Shurmur and McNabb helped guide the Eagles to their first Super Bowl appearance since the 1980 season.

=== St. Louis Rams ===
On January 21, 2009, Shurmur was hired by Steve Spagnuolo to be the offensive coordinator of the St. Louis Rams.

He helped the Rams improve to a 7–9 record following a 1–15 season in 2009, the second-biggest turnaround in the league in 2010. He guided St. Louis’ offense to improvements in nearly every category including total yards, time of possession and third-down percentage, while they also scored 114 more points than the previous year. In addition, the Rams committed just 21 turnovers in 2010, tied for the ninth-lowest total in the NFL.

Shurmur also made a tangible impact on Sam Bradford's immediate success as a rookie in 2010. The first-overall pick out of the University of Oklahoma set NFL rookie records for most consecutive passes without an interception (169) and most completions (354). Under Shurmur's tutelage, Bradford finished the season with a 60.0 completion percentage, 3,512 yards and 18 touchdown passes, winning the AP NFL Offensive Rookie of the Year Award.

=== Cleveland Browns ===
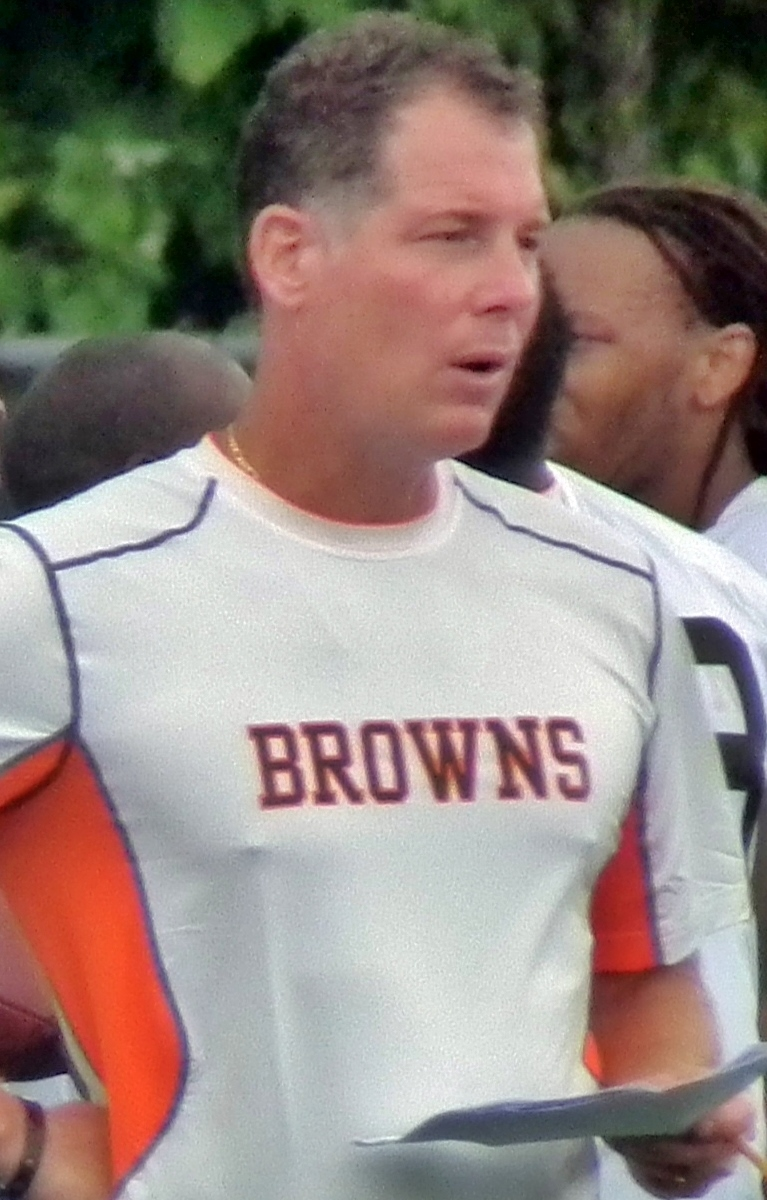
Shurmur with the Browns in 2012.

Shurmur was interviewed by the Cleveland Browns on January 7, 2011, to be their head coach. On January 13, 2011, Shurmur was hired by Mike Holmgren, with whom he shares agent Bob LaMonte, to become the next head coach of the Cleveland Browns. He was the 13th head coach in franchise history, and the sixth since the franchise's revival in 1999.

Part of the reason Shurmur was hired was the team wanted him to call the plays on offense as Holmgren did in Green Bay and Seattle. Another reason for the hire was Shurmur's past success of developing young quarterbacks such as McNabb and Bradford. The Browns had selected quarterback Colt McCoy in the third round of the 2010 NFL draft, and in McCoy's first season with Shurmur as his coach, the former Texas standout posted a slight improvement in 2011, throwing for 2,733 yards and 14 touchdown passes in 13 games. Despite this, the Browns went 4–12 that season, a regression from the previous year's 5–11 campaign. In 2012, the Browns showed little progress behind new starter and first round draft pick Brandon Weeden, who finished 29th out of 32 qualified starters in passer rating.

After the end of the 2012 season, Shurmur and general manager Tom Heckert, Jr. were fired, after accumulating a 9–23 record over the course of the 2011 and 2012 seasons and having finished 25th in the NFL in offensive yards gained in the 2012 season.

=== Second stint with Eagles ===
On January 20, 2013, Shurmur accepted a job with the Philadelphia Eagles as their offensive coordinator. Working alongside new head coach Chip Kelly, Shurmur helped orchestrate one of the most efficient offenses in the NFL. Shurmur led an offense that set a number of team records, including points (442), total net yards (6,676), touchdowns (53), passing yards (4,406) and fewest turnovers (19) en route to an NFC East title. Additionally, the Eagles set an NFL record with 99 plays of 20+ yards and became the first team since the 1991 Buffalo Bills to lead the league in rushing while ranking last in time of possession.

Shurmur's unique ability to develop young talent at the quarterback position was once again on display in 2013. Second-year QB Nick Foles enjoyed a breakout season under the direction of Shurmur, throwing for 27 touchdowns and only two interceptions while posting the third-best QB rating (119.2) and third-lowest interception percentage (0.63%) in NFL history. Foles also became just the seventh player in league history to throw for seven touchdowns in a game during a match-up against the Oakland Raiders, and one of three who have done so without throwing an interception.

==== Interim head coach ====
Shurmur was named interim head coach of the Eagles after Kelly was fired on December 29, 2015. Shurmur's one game was a 35–30 win over the Giants that was for 2nd place in the NFC East. The Eagles offense gained 435 yards of total offense and scored four touchdowns, highlighted by DeMarco Murray running for a 54-yard touchdown in his first carry under Shurmur. Shurmur interviewed for the Eagles' head coaching job and was considered one of the leading candidates until the end, but he lost out to Chiefs offensive coordinator Doug Pederson.

=== Minnesota Vikings ===
On January 25, 2016, the Minnesota Vikings named Shurmur their new tight ends coach. On November 2, 2016, the Vikings promoted him to interim offensive coordinator in the wake of Norv Turner's resignation. He was confirmed for the position for the 2017 season. The Vikings finished the season ranked 11th highest scoring offense, after being only 28th overall in 2016. Second-string quarterback Case Keenum posted the best season of his five-year NFL career, after taking over for Sam Bradford, who suffered a knee injury in Week 1. Shurmur was named the NFL Assistant Coach of the Year for the 2017 season.

=== New York Giants ===
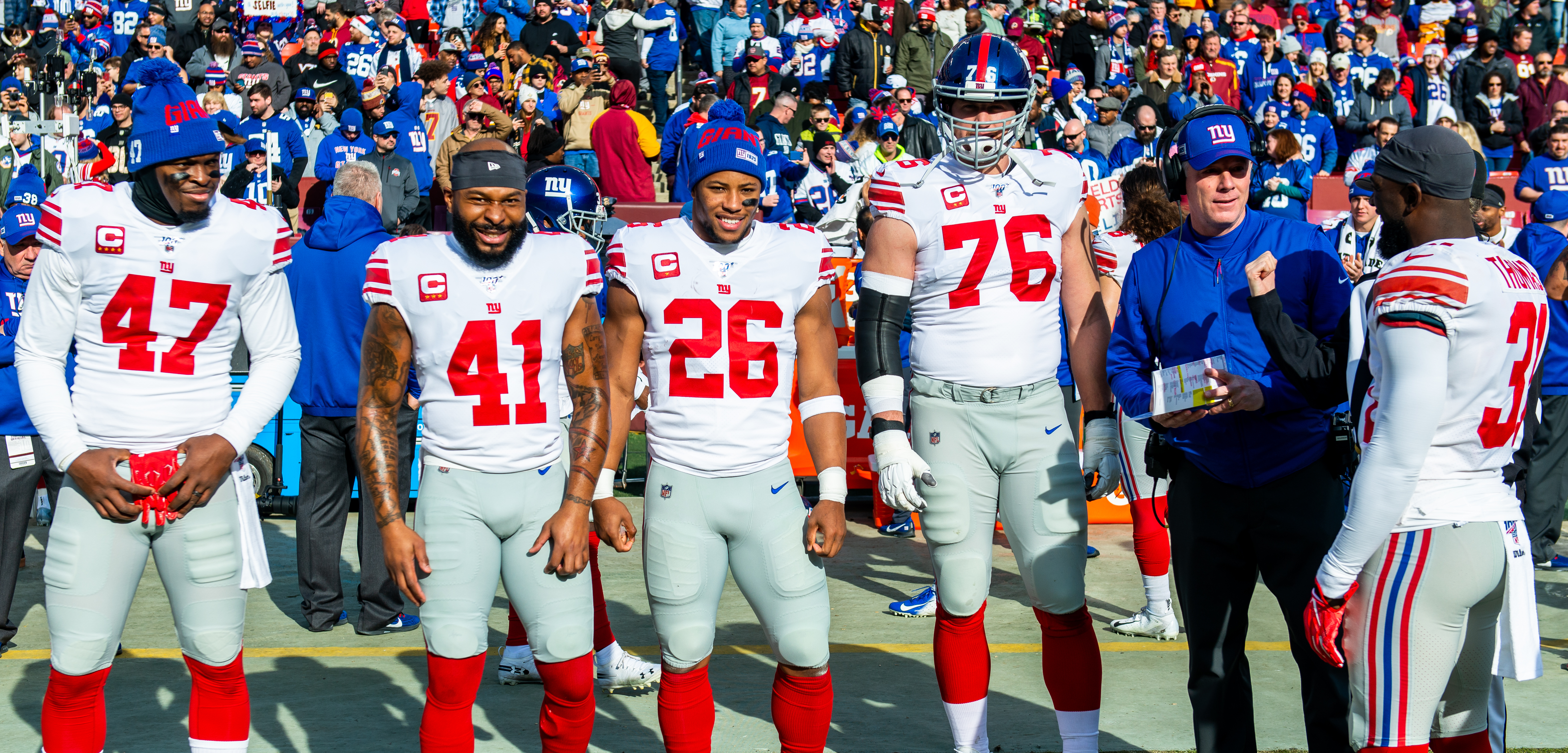
Shurmur alongside Giants' team captains in a game against the Washington Redskins

On January 22, 2018, Shurmur was hired by the New York Giants as their head coach to replace the fired Ben McAdoo.

In his first season as head coach, Shurmur led the team to a 5–11 record.

Following the season, the team used the sixth overall pick in the 2019 NFL draft, to select quarterback Daniel Jones. After starting the 2019 season 0–2, Shurmur named Jones the starter on September 17, 2019, replacing Eli Manning. On December 30, Shurmur was fired by the Giants after the team finished the season 4–12 and missed the playoffs.

=== Denver Broncos ===
On January 14, 2020, Shurmur was hired by the Denver Broncos as their offensive coordinator, replacing Rich Scangarello. His first year with the Broncos was tumultuous, including having to start receiver Kendall Hinton at quarterback due to COVID-19 protocols for a game and a cycle of younger quarterbacks who combined to have the worst team passer rating in the league. Denver also had the 28th-ranked scoring offense and led the league in total turnovers.

The offense's performance improved early in 2021 before being hampered by injuries to the receivers. In Week 16 against the Las Vegas Raiders, Shurmur's offensive game plan yielded just 40 plays, eight first downs, and 158 yards of total offense, the second fewest in a game in which the Broncos had a true quarterback playing in the last 29 years. The run offense managed just 18 yards on 16 carries, which is tied for the third-fewest in franchise history.

On January 9, 2022, Shurmur and Broncos head coach Vic Fangio were fired. After his dismissal, he opted to spend a year away from football to be with his family.

=== University of Colorado ===
He was hired by the Colorado Buffaloes in the summer 2023 to serve as an offensive analyst. After a four-game losing streak, Shurmur was promoted to co-offensive coordinator alongside the existing Sean Lewis and took over play calling from Lewis.

Shurmur became the sole offensive coordinator for the 2024 season following Lewis' departure for San Diego State. Under his leadership, the Buffaloes offense improved significantly and helped lead the Buffs to a 9–3 season and a berth in the Alamo Bowl in their first season back in the Big 12. It was the first time Colorado had won 9 games since the 2016 season. Shurmur helped Colorado improve from 60th in total offense in 2023 to 31st in scoring offense in 2024, and included breakout seasons from quarterback Shedeur Sanders, who led the nation in completion percentage, and Travis Hunter, who went on to win the Heisman Trophy after the season and eventually was the second overall pick in the 2025 NFL draft. He was the first Buffalo to win the Heisman Trophy since Rashaan Salaam in 1994.

After a 53-7 loss to Utah on October 25, 2025, head coach Deion Sanders demoted Shurmur to quarterbacks coach. Tight ends coach and passing game coordinator Brett Bartolone took over play calling following his demotion. Shurmur was not retained after the season.

== Personal life ==
Shurmur's wife, Jennifer, also attended Michigan State. They have four children together.

His son, Kyle Shurmur, committed to play at Vanderbilt and was rated as a top QB prospect for the 2015 recruiting class. ESPN rated Kyle as the #110 overall player and #7 Pocket Passing QB. He became the starting quarterback as a sophomore in 2016 and continued that role in 2017 and 2018. He signed with the Kansas City Chiefs as an undrafted free agent after not being selected in the 2019 NFL draft.

Shurmur is the nephew of the late Fritz Shurmur, former defensive coordinator for the Green Bay Packers, who wrote a book on coaching football, Coaching Team Defense (ISBN 978-1606793596).

== Head coaching record ==
Team	Year	Regular season					Postseason			
Team	Year	Won	Lost	Ties	Win %	Finish	Won	Lost	Win %	Result
CLE	2011	4	12	0	.250	4th in AFC North	—	—	—	—
CLE	2012	5	11	0	.313	4th in AFC North	—	—	—	—
CLE total		9	23	0	.281		—	—	—	
PHI*	2015	1	0	0	1.000	2nd in NFC East	—	—	—	—
PHI total		1	0	0	1.000		—	—	—	
NYG	2018	5	11	0	.313	4th in NFC East	—	—	—	—
NYG	2019	4	12	0	.250	3rd in NFC East	—	—	—	—
NYG total		9	23	0	.281		—	—	—	
Total		19	46	0	.292		—	—	—	

* – Interim head coach
