= Tom Heckert Jr. =

American football administrator (1967–2018)

Tom Heckert
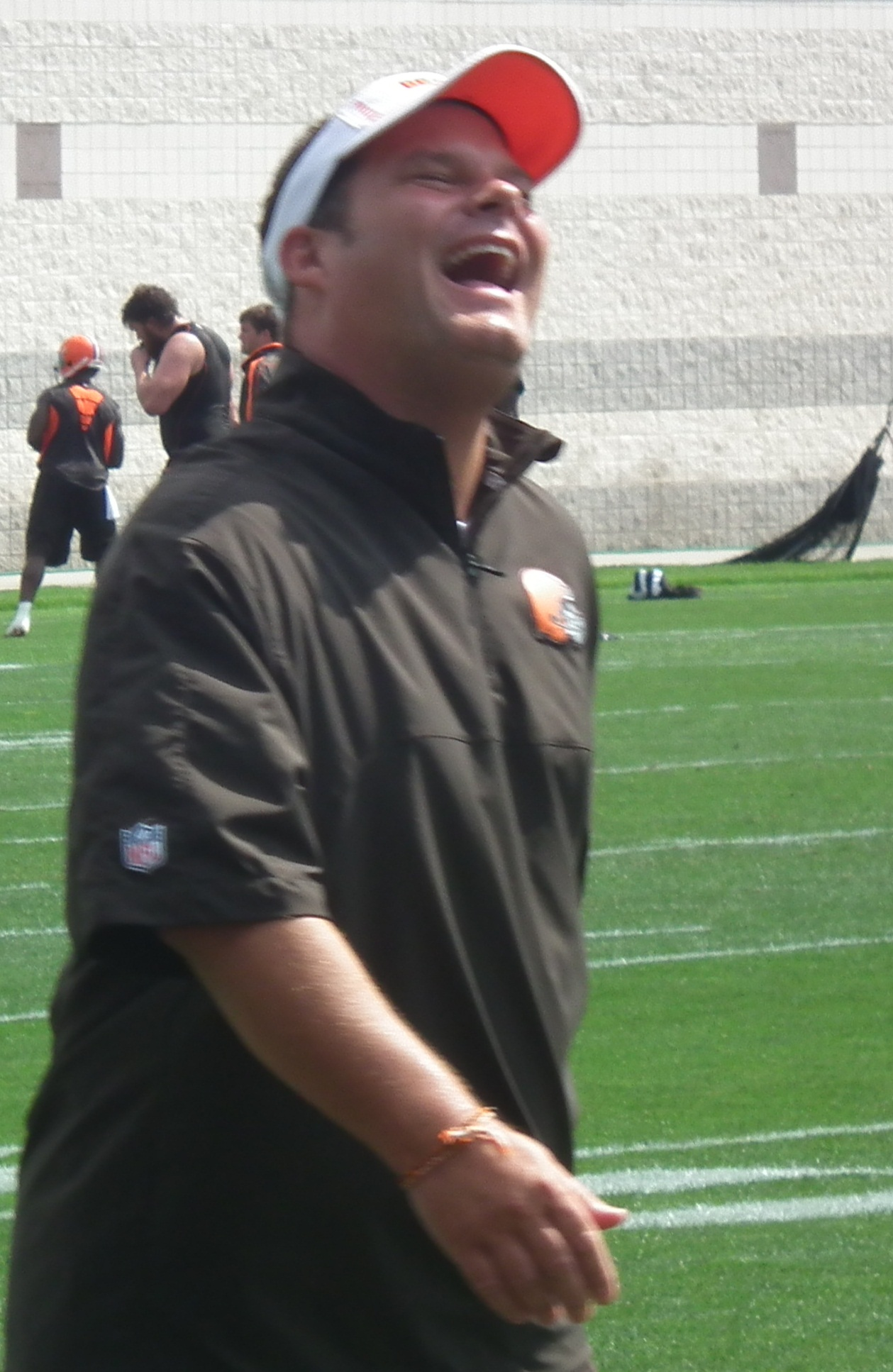
- Heckert with the Cleveland Browns in 2012

Personal information
- Born: July 17, 1967; Youngstown, Ohio, U.S.
- Died: August 5, 2018 (aged 51); Adrian, Michigan, U.S.

Career information
- High school: Adrian (MI)
- College: Hillsdale

Career history
- Miami Dolphins (1991–1999) Pro scout & college scout; Miami Dolphins (1999) Assistant director of pro personnel; Miami Dolphins (2000–2001) Director of pro personnel; Philadelphia Eagles (2001–2003) Director of pro personnel; Philadelphia Eagles (2003–2006) Vice president of pro personnel; Philadelphia Eagles (2006–2010) General manager; Cleveland Browns (2010–2012) General manager; Denver Broncos (2013–2016) Director of pro personnel; Denver Broncos (2017) Senior personnel advisor

Awards and highlights
- Super Bowl champion (50)
- Executive profile at Pro Football Reference

Thomas Heckert Jr. (July 17, 1967 – August 5, 2018) was an American football executive who served as the general manager for the Cleveland Browns and Philadelphia Eagles of the National Football League (NFL). In his 27-year career, Heckert was a part of 17 postseason campaigns, 11 division titles, eight conference championship games, three Super Bowl appearances and one Super Bowl Championship, while with the Denver Broncos.

== Early life ==
Heckert played quarterback and defensive back at Adrian High School in Michigan graduating in 1986. He led the Maples to a 7-2 record his senior season and earned all-South Central Conference as a defensive back. He then attended Hillsdale College playing football in the 1987 and 1988 seasons. He also was a member of the golf team for the Chargers. Heckert started his football career as an assistant coach for Hillsdale for two seasons before making his way into the NFL.

== Miami Dolphins ==
Heckert had a 10-year stint with the Miami Dolphins (1991–2000), spending his first nine seasons there as both a pro and college scout. Heckert also served as the Dolphins' assistant director of pro personnel and college scout in 1999, before being promoted to director of pro personnel in 2000.

== Philadelphia Eagles ==
Heckert first went to the Eagles as director of player personnel in 2001 before being promoted to vice president of player personnel in 2003. He helped Eagles coach Andy Reid assemble a team that went to four straight NFC Championship Games from 2001 to 2004, and to Super Bowl XXXIX. He was promoted to general manager on January 2, 2006. Despite Heckert's title of general manager, Reid served as executive vice president of football operations and had the final say in football matters.

During Heckert's tenure with the Eagles, the team drafted or acquired 10 players who would go on to earn Pro Bowl status, including kicker David Akers, defensive lineman Trent Cole, wide receiver DeSean Jackson, offensive lineman Jason Peters, cornerback Asante Samuel and fullback Leonard Weaver, all of whom were selected to the 2010 Pro Bowl. Of the 22 Eagles starters at the end of the 2009 season, 13 were draft choices of the team during Heckert's tenure while two more were signed as undrafted free agents. In fact, three players from the club's 2009 draft class were among the 13.

== Cleveland Browns ==
On January 11, 2010, Heckert became the general manager of the Cleveland Browns.

On December 31, 2012, Heckert, along with head coach Pat Shurmur was relieved of his duties as Browns general manager by Joe Banner, his former boss with the Eagles. Heckert and former team president Mike Holmgren posted a record of 14–34 with the Browns and their significant draft selections included Pro-Bowlers Joe Haden, T. J. Ward, Jordan Cameron, and Josh Gordon.

== Denver Broncos ==
On May 7, 2013, Heckert was hired as director of pro personnel for the Denver Broncos. His job was to scout current NFL players and oversee the team's advanced scouting for upcoming opponents. On May 4, 2017, Heckert was promoted to senior personnel advisor. Heckert stepped down prior to the 2018 season due to an expired contract and health issues.

== NFL ==
Heckert also served on the NFL's college advisory committee, which advises college football juniors on their draft status, as well as the league's general managers advisory committee, which consults Commissioner Roger Goodell and the NFL football operations department on key issues regarding player development, scouting and technology.

== Personal life ==
Heckert was the son of former Miami Dolphins personnel executive Tom Heckert Sr., and had a son, Griffin, and a daughter, Madison.

On June 11, 2013, Heckert was arrested and charged with DUI and reckless driving. The Denver Broncos organization subsequently suspended him for a month without pay.

Heckert died on August 5, 2018, from amyloidosis.
