= 2014 Cincinnati Bengals season =

NFL team season

- Owner: Mike Brown
- Head coach: Marvin Lewis
- Offensive coordinator: Hue Jackson
- Defensive coordinator: Paul Guenther
- Home stadium: Paul Brown Stadium

Results
- Record: 10–5–1
- Division place: 2nd AFC North
- Playoffs: Lost Wild Card Playoffs (at Colts) 10–26
- Pro Bowlers: DT Geno Atkins; QB Andy Dalton; WR A. J. Green; P Kevin Huber

Uniform
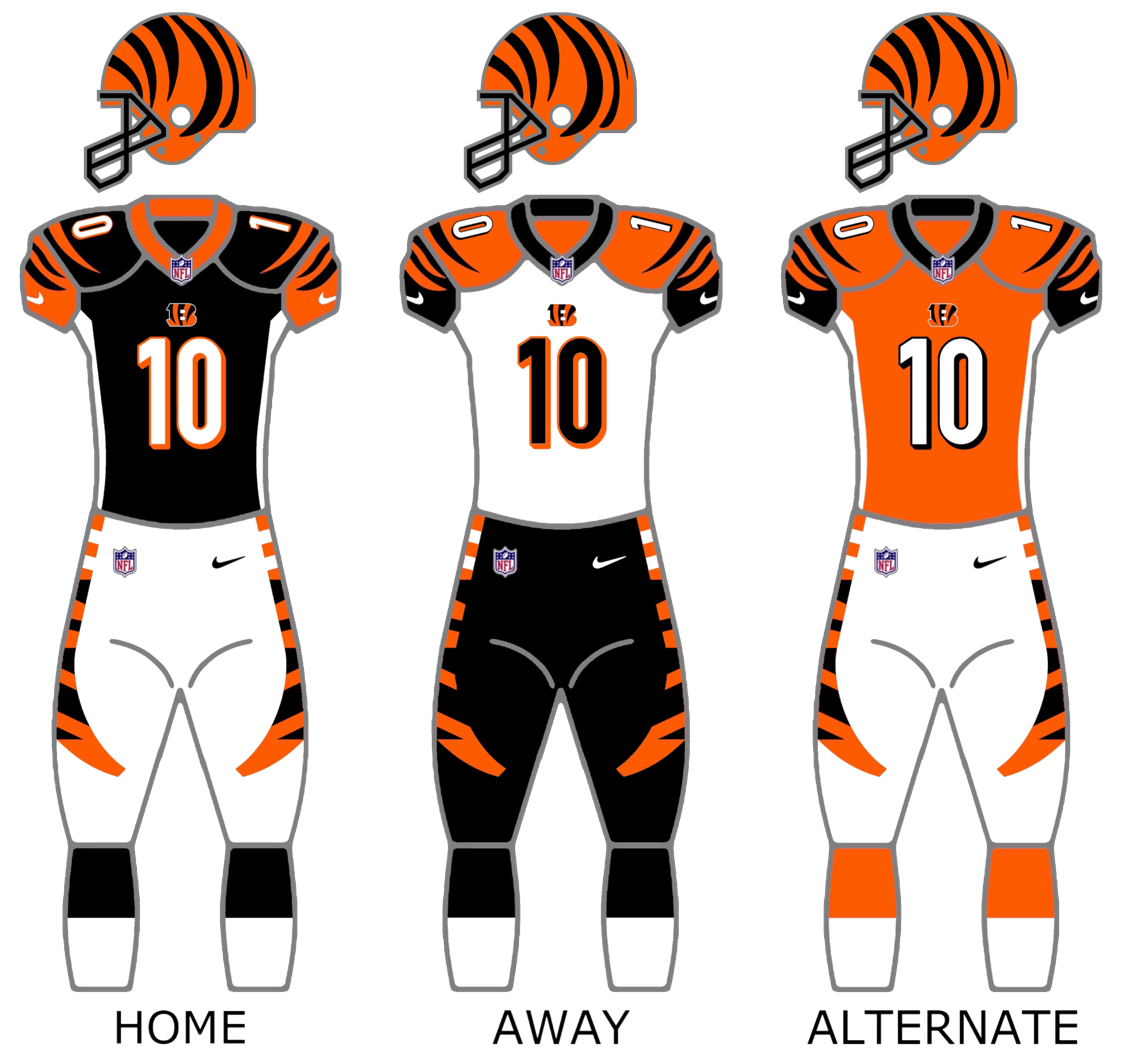

The 2014 season was the Cincinnati Bengals' 45th in the National Football League (NFL), their 47th overall and their 12th under head coach Marvin Lewis. The Bengals qualified for the playoffs for the fourth consecutive season, but lost to the Indianapolis Colts in the wild card round, extending their playoff losing streak to seven games, the third-longest losing streak (in terms of games played) in NFL history at the time, behind the Detroit Lions and Kansas City Chiefs (8 each).

== 2014 draft class ==
2014 Cincinnati Bengals Draft
Round	Selection	Player	Position	College
1	24	Darqueze Dennard	Cornerback	Michigan State
2	55	Jeremy Hill	Running back	LSU
3	88	Will Clarke	Defensive end	West Virginia
4	111	Russell Bodine	Center	North Carolina
5	164	A. J. McCarron	Quarterback	Alabama
6	212	Marquis Flowers	Linebacker	Arizona
7	239	James Wright	Wide receiver	LSU
7	252	Lavelle Westbrooks	Cornerback	Georgia Southern

Compensatory selection

Draft trades

- The Bengals traded their original fourth- and sixth-round selections (Nos. 123 and 199 overall, respectively) to the Seattle Seahawks in exchange for the Seahawks' fourth-round selection (No. 111 overall).

== Personnel ==
=== Staff / Coaches ===
2014 Cincinnati Bengals staff
Front office: President – Mike Brown; Senior vice president of player personnel – Pete Brown; Executive vice president – Katie Blackburn; Vice president of player personnel – Paul H. Brown; Director of player personnel – Duke Tobin; Head coaches: Head coach – Marvin Lewis; Assistant head coach/offensive line coach – Paul Alexander; Offensive coaches: Offensive coordinator – Hue Jackson; Quarterbacks – Ken Zampese; Running backs – Kyle Caskey; Wide receivers – James Urban; Tight ends – Jonathan Hayes; Offensive assistant/quality control – Brian Braswell	Defensive coaches: Defensive coordinator – Paul Guenther; Defensive line – Jay Hayes; Linebackers – Matt Burke; Assistant linebackers/quality control – David Lippincott; Defensive backs – Vance Joseph; Defensive backs – Mark Carrier; Defensive assistant/quality control – Marcus Lewis; Special teams coaches: Special teams coordinator – Darrin Simmons; Assistant special teams/quality control – Brayden Coombs; Strength and conditioning: Head strength and conditioning – Chip Morton; Strength and conditioning assistant – Jeff Friday

=== Final roster ===
2014 Cincinnati Bengals roster
Quarterbacks (QB): 17 Jason Campbell; 14 Andy Dalton; 5 A. J. McCarron; Running backs (RB): 25 Giovani Bernard; 33 Rex Burkhead; 32 Jeremy Hill; 30 Cedric Peerman; Wide receivers (WR): 18 A. J. Green; 88 Greg Little; 12 Mohamed Sanu; 11 Dane Sanzenbacher; 19 Brandon Tate; 86 James Wright; Tight ends (TE): 83 Kevin Brock; 84 Jermaine Gresham; 89 Ryan Hewitt	Offensive linemen (OL): 61 Russell Bodine C; 65 Clint Boling G; 72 Tanner Hawkinson T; 60 T. J. Johnson C; 74 Marshall Newhouse T; 67 Mike Pollak G; 77 Andrew Whitworth T; 73 Eric Winston T; 68 Kevin Zeitler G; Defensive linemen (DL): 97 Geno Atkins DT; 93 Will Clarke DE; 96 Carlos Dunlap DE; 91 Robert Geathers DE; 95 Wallace Gilberry DE; 99 Margus Hunt DE; 94 Domata Peko DT; 75 Devon Still DT; 98 Brandon Thompson DT	Linebackers (LB): 56 Chris Carter OLB; 53 Marquis Flowers OLB; 52 Nico Johnson MLB; 59 Emmanuel Lamur OLB; 58 Rey Maualuga MLB; 57 Vincent Rey; Defensive backs (DB): 21 Darqueze Dennard CB; 29 Leon Hall CB; 43 George Iloka SS; 24 Adam Jones CB; 27 Dre Kirkpatrick CB; 37 Chris Lewis-Harris CB; 26 Taylor Mays FS; 20 Reggie Nelson FS; 23 Terence Newman CB; 36 Shawn Williams SS; Special teams (ST): 46 Clark Harris LS; 10 Kevin Huber P; 2 Mike Nugent K	Practice squad: 63 Emmett Cleary T; 50 L. J. Fort LB; 64 Dan France T; 76 Kwame Geathers DT; 87 Cobi Hamilton WR; 39 Onterio McCalebb CB; 70 Sam Montgomery DE; 80 Jake Murphy TE; 16 Tevin Reese WR; 34 James Wilder Jr. RB; Reserve: 55 Vontaze Burfict OLB (IR); 51 Jayson DiManche OLB (IR); 85 Tyler Eifert TE (IR/DFR); 73 Trey Hopkins G (IR); 82 Marvin Jones WR (IR); 56 Sean Porter OLB (IR); -- J. K. Schaffer MLB (IR); 81 Alex Smith TE (IR); 71 Andre Smith RT (IR); Rookies in italics 53 active, 9 reserve, 10 practice squad

== Schedule ==
=== Preseason ===
Week	Date	Opponent	Result	Record	Venue	Recap
1	August 7	at Kansas City Chiefs	**L** 39–41	0–1	Arrowhead Stadium	Recap
2	August 16	New York Jets	**L** 17–25	0–2	Paul Brown Stadium	Recap
3	August 24	at Arizona Cardinals	**W** 19–13	1–2	University of Phoenix Stadium	Recap
4	August 28	Indianapolis Colts	**W** 35–7	2–2	Paul Brown Stadium	Recap

=== Regular season ===
Week	Date	Opponent	Result	Record	Venue	Recap
1	September 7	at **Baltimore Ravens**	**W** 23–16	1–0	M&T Bank Stadium	Recap
2	September 14	Atlanta Falcons	**W** 24–10	2–0	Paul Brown Stadium	Recap
3	September 21	Tennessee Titans	**W** 33–7	3–0	Paul Brown Stadium	Recap
4	Bye					
5	October 5	at New England Patriots	**L** 17–43	3–1	Gillette Stadium	Recap
6	October 12	Carolina Panthers	**T** 37–37 (OT)	3–1–1	Paul Brown Stadium	Recap
7	October 19	at Indianapolis Colts	**L** 0–27	3–2–1	Lucas Oil Stadium	Recap
8	October 26	**Baltimore Ravens**	**W** 27–24	4–2–1	Paul Brown Stadium	Recap
9	November 2	Jacksonville Jaguars	**W** 33–23	5–2–1	Paul Brown Stadium	Recap
10	November 6	**Cleveland Browns**	**L** 3–24	5–3–1	Paul Brown Stadium	Recap
11	November 16	at New Orleans Saints	**W** 27–10	6–3–1	Mercedes-Benz Superdome	Recap
12	November 23	at Houston Texans	**W** 22–13	7–3–1	NRG Stadium	Recap
13	November 30	at Tampa Bay Buccaneers	**W** 14–13	8–3–1	Raymond James Stadium	Recap
14	December 7	**Pittsburgh Steelers**	**L** 21–42	8–4–1	Paul Brown Stadium	Recap
15	December 14	at **Cleveland Browns**	**W** 30–0	9–4–1	FirstEnergy Stadium	Recap
16	December 22	Denver Broncos	**W** 37–28	10–4–1	Paul Brown Stadium	Recap
17	December 28	at **Pittsburgh Steelers**	**L** 17–27	10–5–1	Heinz Field	Recap

Note: Intra-division opponents are in bold text.

=== Postseason ===
Round	Date	Opponent (seed)	Result	Record	Venue	Recap
Wild Card	January 4, 2015	at Indianapolis Colts (4)	**L** 10–26	0–1	Lucas Oil Stadium	Recap

== Game summaries ==
=== Regular season ===
==== Week 1: at Baltimore Ravens ====
Week One: Cincinnati Bengals at Baltimore Ravens – Game summary

Quarter	1	2	3	4	Total
Bengals	6	9	0	8	23
Ravens	0	0	7	9	16

at M&T Bank Stadium, Baltimore, Maryland

- Date: September 7
- Game time: 1:00 p.m. EDT
- Game weather: 74 °F (23 °C), partly cloudy
- Game attendance: 70,925
- Referee: Gene Steratore
- TV announcers (CBS): Spero Dedes and Solomon Wilcots
- Recap, Gamebook

Game information

First quarter

- CIN – Mike Nugent 49-yard field goal, 10:25. Bengals 3–0. Drive: 11 plays, 49 yards, 4:35.
- CIN – Mike Nugent 22-yard field goal, 1:25. Bengals 6–0. Drive: 6 plays, 25 yards, 2:42.

Second quarter

- CIN – Mike Nugent 28-yard field goal, 10:13. Bengals 9–0. Drive: 11 plays, 55 yards, 4:40.
- CIN – Mike Nugent 47-yard field goal, 4:36. Bengals 12–0. Drive: 8 plays, 27 yards, 3:15.
- CIN – Mike Nugent 38-yard field goal, 2:07. Bengals 15–0. Drive: 4 plays, 3 yards, 2:23.

Third quarter

- BAL – Justin Forsett 13-yard run (Justin Tucker kick), 2:20. Bengals 15–7. Drive: 10 plays, 82 yards, 4:25.

Fourth quarter

- BAL – Justin Tucker 38-yard field goal, 10:28. Bengals 15–10. Drive: 14 plays, 48 yards, 5:23.
- BAL – Steve Smith Sr. 80-yard pass from Joe Flacco (run failed), 5:46. Ravens 16–15. Drive: 6 plays, 92 yards, 2:43.
- CIN – A. J. Green 77-yard pass from Andy Dalton (Andy Dalton-Mohamed Sanu pass), 4:58. Bengals 23–16. Drive: 2 plays, 80 yards, 0:48.

Top passers

- CIN – Andy Dalton – 25/38, 301 yards, TD
- BAL – Joe Flacco – 35/62, 345 yards, TD, INT

Top rushers

- CIN – Giovani Bernard – 14 rushes, 48 yards
- BAL – Justin Forsett – 11 rushes, 85 yards, TD

Top receivers

- CIN – A. J. Green – 6 receptions, 131 yards, TD
- BAL – Dennis Pitta – 10 receptions, 89 yards

Andy Dalton would throw a 77-yard touchdown pass to A. J. Green with 4:58 remaining to give the Bengals the win. With the win, the Bengals started 1-0. They also won at Baltimore for the first time since 2009.

==== Week 2: vs. Atlanta Falcons ====
Week Two: Atlanta Falcons at Cincinnati Bengals – Game summary

Quarter	1	2	3	4	Total
Falcons	3	0	0	7	10
Bengals	3	7	14	0	24

at Paul Brown Stadium, Cincinnati, Ohio

- Date: September 14
- Game time: 1:00 pm. EDT
- Game weather: 66 °F (19 °C), cloudy
- Game attendance: 58,574
- Referee: Bill Vinovich
- TV announcers (CBS): Kevin Harlan and Rich Gannon
- Recap, Gamebook

Game information

First quarter

- CIN – Mike Nugent 31-yard field goal, 5:19. Bengals 3–0. Drive: 13 plays, 69 yards, 5:57.
- ATL – Matt Bryant 46-yard field goal, 1:08. Tied 3–3. Drive: 9 plays, 40 yards, 4:11.

Second quarter

- CIN – Giovani Bernard 4-yard run (Mike Nugent kick), 2:11. Bengals 10–3. Drive: 10 plays, 91 yards, 5:21.

Third quarter

- CIN – Mohamed Sanu 76-yard pass from Andy Dalton (Mike Nugent kick), 10:58. Bengals 17–3. Drive: 3 plays, 80 yards, 1:12.
- CIN – Jeremy Hill 1-yard run (Mike Nugent kick), 6:28. Bengals 24–3. Drive: 8 plays, 43 yards, 4:14.

Fourth quarter

- ATL – Julio Jones 14-yard pass from Matt Ryan (Matt Bryant kick), 8:35. Bengals 24–10. Drive: 10 plays, 77 yards, 3:59.

Top passers

- ATL – Matt Ryan – 24/44, 231 yards, TD, 3 INT
- CIN – Andy Dalton – 15/23, 252 yards, TD

Top rushers

- ATL – Steven Jackson – 11 rushes, 46 yards
- CIN – Giovani Bernard – 27 rushes, 90 yards, TD

Top receivers

- ATL – Julio Jones – 7 receptions, 88 yards, TD
- CIN – Mohamed Sanu – 3 receptions, 84 yards, TD

The Bengals defense would have themselves a day, intercepting Falcons quarterback Matt Ryan 3 times in the win. With the win, the Bengals started 2-0 for the first time since 2006.

==== Week 3: vs. Tennessee Titans ====
Week Three: Tennessee Titans at Cincinnati Bengals – Game summary

Quarter	1	2	3	4	Total
Titans	0	0	0	7	7
Bengals	10	9	7	7	33

at Paul Brown Stadium, Cincinnati, Ohio

- Date: September 21, 2014
- Game time: 1:00 p.m. EDT/12:00 pm. CDT
- Game weather: 74 °F (23 °C), mostly cloudy
- Game attendance: 56,743
- Referee: Brad Allen
- TV announcers (CBS): Brad Johansen and Chris Simms
- Recap, Gamebook

Game information

First quarter

- CIN – Mike Nugent 29-yard field goal, 4:48. Bengals 3–0. Drive: 9 plays, 59 yards, 4:03.
- CIN – Andy Dalton 18-yard pass from Mohamed Sanu (Mike Nugent kick), 0:00. Bengals 10–0. Drive: 5 plays, 73 yards, 2:35.

Second quarter

- CIN – Penalty on Quentin Groves enforced in end zone for a safety, 6:25. Bengals 12–0.
- CIN – Giovani Bernard 1-yard run (Mike Nugent kick), 3:29. Bengals 19–0. Drive: 1 play, 17 yards, 0:09.

Third quarter

- CIN – Giovani Bernard 1-yard run (Mike Nugent kick), 1:58. Bengals 26–0. Drive: 14 plays, 80 yards, 7:18.

Fourth quarter

- CIN – Jeremy Hill 4-yard run (Mike Nugent kick), 9:26. Bengals 33–0. Drive: 8 plays, 76 yards, 4:07.
- TEN – Shonn Greene 1-yard run (Ryan Succop kick), 6:09. Bengals 33–7. Drive: 6 plays, 80 yards, 3:17.

Top passers

- TEN – Jake Locker – 17/34, 185 yards, 2 INT
- CIN – Andy Dalton – 15/23, 169 yards, INT

Top rushers

- TEN – Bishop Sankey – 10 rushes, 61 yards
- CIN – Giovani Bernard – 14 rushes, 47 yards, 2 TD

Top receivers

- TEN – Delanie Walker – 4 receptions, 54 yards
- CIN – A. J. Green – 6 receptions, 102 yards

With the win, the Bengals started 3-0 for the first time since 2006. It is also their 3rd 3-0 start under Marvin Lewis.

==== Week 5: at New England Patriots ====
Week Five: Cincinnati Bengals at New England Patriots – Game summary

Quarter	1	2	3	4	Total
Bengals	0	3	14	0	17
Patriots	14	6	14	9	43

at Gillette Stadium, Foxborough, Massachusetts

- Date: October 5
- Game time: 8:30 pm. EDT
- Game weather: 47 °F (8 °C), clear and cool
- Game attendance: 68,756
- Referee: Jerome Boger
- TV announcers (NBC): Al Michaels, Cris Collinsworth and Michele Tafoya
- Recap, Gamebook

Game information

First quarter

- NE – Stevan Ridley 1-yard run (Stephen Gostkowski kick), 10:03. Patriots 7–0. Drive: 10 plays, 80 yards, 4:57.
- NE – Tim Wright 17-yard pass from Tom Brady (Stephen Gostkowski kick), 3:12. Patriots 14–0. Drive: 6 plays, 58 yards, 2:33.

Second quarter

- CIN – Mike Nugent 23-yard field goal, 4:33. Patriots 14–3. Drive: 10 plays, 57 yards, 4:19.
- NE – Stephen Gostkowski 48-yard field goal, 1:12. Patriots 17–3. Drive: 11 plays, 50 yards, 3:21.
- NE – Stephen Gostkowski 19-yard field goal, 0:09. Patriots 20–3. Drive: 5 plays, 24 yards, 0:19.

Third quarter

- CIN – Mohamed Sanu 37-yard pass from Andy Dalton (Mike Nugent kick), 11:27. Patriots 20–10. Drive: 1 play, 37 yards, 0:05.
- NE – Rob Gronkowski 16-yard pass from Tom Brady (Stephen Gostkowski kick), 6:06. Patriots 27–10. Drive: 10 plays, 86 yards, 5:21.
- NE – Kyle Arrington 9-yard fumble return (Stephen Gostkowski kick), 6:00. Patriots 34–10.
- CIN – A. J. Green 17-yard pass from Andy Dalton (Mike Nugent kick), 3:43. Patriots 34–17. Drive: 6 plays, 82 yards, 2:17.

Fourth quarter

- NE – Stephen Gostkowski 23-yard field goal, 14:54. Patriots 37–17. Drive: 9 plays, 75 yards, 3:49.
- NE – Stephen Gostkowski 47-yard field goal, 7:53. Patriots 40–17. Drive: 9 plays, 43 yards, 4:21.
- NE – Stephen Gostkowski 35-yard field goal, 2:55. Patriots 43–17. Drive: 8 plays, 32 yards, 4:11.

Top passers

- CIN – Andy Dalton – 15/24, 204 yards, 2 TD
- NE – Tom Brady – 23/35, 292 yards, 2 TD

Top rushers

- CIN – Giovani Bernard – 13 rushes, 62 yards
- NE – Stevan Ridley – 27 rushes, 113 yards, TD

Top receivers

- CIN – A. J. Green – 5 receptions, 81 yards, TD
- NE – Rob Gronkowski – 6 receptions, 100 yards, TD

With the loss, the Bengals fell to 3-1.

==== Week 6: vs. Carolina Panthers ====
Week Six: Carolina Panthers at Cincinnati Bengals – Game summary

Quarter	1	2	3	4	OT	Total
Panthers	7	3	14	10	3	37
Bengals	0	17	0	17	3	37

at Paul Brown Stadium, Cincinnati, Ohio

- Date: October 12
- Game time: 1:00 pm. EDT
- Game weather: 60 °F (16 °C), cloudy
- Game attendance: 57,053
- Referee: Carl Cheffers
- TV announcers (Fox): Chris Myers, Ronde Barber and Jennifer Hale
- Recap, Gamebook

Game information

First quarter

- CAR – Kelvin Benjamin 3-yard pass from Cam Newton (Graham Gano kick), 5:45. Panthers 7–0. Drive: 15 plays, 86 yards, 9:16.

Second quarter

- CIN – Brandon Tate 5-yard pass from Andy Dalton (Mike Nugent kick), 14:21. Tied 7–7. Drive: 14 plays, 69 yards, 6:29.
- CIN – Giovani Bernard 89-yard run (Mike Nugent kick), 11:50. Bengals 14–7. Drive: 1 play, 89 yards, 0:15.
- CAR – Graham Gano 39-yard field goal, 6:20. Bengals 14–10. Drive: 11 plays, 61 yards, 5:30.
- CIN – Mike Nugent 44-yard field goal, 0:03. Bengals 17–10. Drive: 12 plays, 54 yards, 6:17.

Third quarter

- CAR – Fozzy Whittaker 4-yard run (Graham Gano kick), 9:07. Tied 17–17. Drive: 2 plays, 10 yards, 0:42.
- CAR – Cam Newton 12-yard run (Graham Gano kick), 3:54. Panthers 24–17. Drive: 6 plays, 77 yards, 2:11.

Fourth quarter

- CIN – Mohamed Sanu 34-yard pass from Andy Dalton (Mike Nugent kick), 11:38. Tied 24–24. Drive: 6 plays, 71 yards, 3:11.
- CAR – Greg Olsen 13-yard pass from Cam Newton (Graham Gano kick), 4:50. Panthers 31–24. Drive: 12 plays, 80 yards, 6:48.
- CIN – Jeremy Hill 3-yard run (Mike Nugent kick), 4:32. Tied 31–31. Drive: 1 play, 3 yards, 0:18.
- CIN – Mike Nugent 38-yard field goal, 2:11. Bengals 34–31. Drive: 4 plays, 4 yards, 1:11.
- CAR – Graham Gano 44-yard field goal, 0:00. Tied 34–34. Drive: 12 plays, 54 yards, 2:11.

Overtime

- CIN – Mike Nugent 42-yard field goal, 8:35. Bengals 37–34. Drive: 13 plays, 56 yards, 6:25.
- CAR – Graham Gano 36-yard field goal, 2:19. Tied 37–37. Drive: 12 plays, 60 yards, 6:16.

Top passers

- CAR – Cam Newton – 29/46, 284 yards, 2 TD, INT
- CIN – Andy Dalton – 33/43, 323 yards, 2 TD, 2 INT

Top rushers

- CAR – Cam Newton – 17 rushes, 107 yards, TD
- CIN – Giovani Bernard – 18 rushes, 137 yards, TD

Top receivers

- CAR – Greg Olsen – 6 receptions, 62 yards, TD
- CIN – Mohamed Sanu – 10 receptions, 120 yards, TD

With the tie, the Bengals were sent to a 3-1-1 record and were given their first tie game since 2008.

==== Week 7: at Indianapolis Colts ====
Week Seven: Cincinnati Bengals at Indianapolis Colts – Game summary

Quarter	1	2	3	4	Total
Bengals	0	0	0	0	0
Colts	3	7	7	10	27

at Lucas Oil Stadium, Indianapolis, Indiana

- Date: October 19
- Game time: 1:00 pm. EDT
- Game weather: 49 °F (9 °C), partly sunny (retractable roof open)
- Game attendance: 66,539
- Referee: Gene Steratore
- TV announcers (CBS): Ian Eagle, Dan Fouts and Jenny Dell
- Recap, Gamebook

Game information

First quarter

- IND – Adam Vinatieri 23-yard field goal, 0:33. Colts 3–0. Drive: 10 plays, 68 yards, 4:16.

Second quarter

- IND – Ahmad Bradshaw 1-yard run (Adam Vinatieri kick), 12:08. Colts 10–0. Drive: 5 plays, 68 yards, 2:45.

Third quarter

- IND – Dwayne Allen 32-yard pass from Andrew Luck (Adam Vinatieri kick), 9:47. Colts 17–0. Drive: 8 plays, 85 yards, 3:54.

Fourth quarter

- IND – Ahmad Bradshaw 10-yard pass from Andrew Luck (Adam Vinatieri kick), 12:09. Colts 24–0. Drive: 13 plays, 85 yards, 7:51.
- IND – Adam Vinatieri 50-yard field goal, 1:55. Colts 27–0. Drive: 11 plays, 63 yards, 6:35.

Top passers

- CIN – Andy Dalton: 18/38, 126 yards
- IND – Andrew Luck: 27/42, 344 yards, 2 TD

Top rushers

- CIN – Giovani Bernard: 7 rushes, 17 yards
- IND – Trent Richardson: 14 rushes, 77 yards

Top receivers

- CIN – Jermaine Gresham: 10 receptions, 48 yards
- IND – T. Y. Hilton: 7 receptions, 107 yards

With the loss, the Bengals fell to 3-2-1. They were also shut out for the first time since 2009.

==== Week 8: vs. Baltimore Ravens ====
Week Eight: Baltimore Ravens at Cincinnati Bengals – Game summary

Quarter	1	2	3	4	Total
Ravens	0	6	8	10	24
Bengals	7	0	10	10	27

at Paul Brown Stadium, Cincinnati, Ohio

- Date: October 26
- Game time: 1:00 pm. EDT
- Game weather: 62 °F (17 °C), sunny
- Game attendance: 55,711
- Referee: Clete Blakeman
- TV announcers (CBS): Greg Gumbel, Trent Green and Evan Washburn
- Recap, Gamebook

Game information

First quarter

- CIN – Andy Dalton 1-yard run (Mike Nugent kick), 10:01. Bengals 7–0. Drive: 9 plays, 80 yards, 4:59.

Second quarter

- BAL – Justin Tucker 45-yard field goal, 9:15. Bengals 7–3. Drive: 10 plays, 24 yards, 5:30.
- BAL – Justin Tucker 50-yard field goal, 1:02. Bengals 7–6. Drive: 8 plays, 35 yards, 3:32.

Third quarter

- CIN – Giovani Bernard 1-yard run (Mike Nugent kick), 9:56. Bengals 14–6. Drive: 8 plays, 51 yards, 3:48.
- CIN – Mike Nugent 32-yard field goal, 6:29. Bengals 17–6. Drive: 4 plays, 4 yards, 1:59.
- BAL – Lorenzo Taliaferro 10-yard run (Justin Forsett run), 1:58. Bengals 17–14. Drive: 9 plays, 79 yards, 4:31.

Fourth quarter

- CIN – Mike Nugent 33-yard field goal, 11:24. Bengals 20–14. Drive: 12 plays, 65 yards, 5:34.
- BAL – Lorenzo Taliaferro 8-yard run (Justin Tucker kick), 6:31. Ravens 21–20. Drive: 1 play, 8 yards, 0:05.
- BAL – Justin Tucker 53-yard field goal, 3:59. Ravens 24–20. Drive: 4 plays, 8 yards, 2:13.
- CIN – Andy Dalton 1-yard run (Mike Nugent kick), 0:57. Bengals 27–24. Drive: 10 plays, 80 yards, 3:02.

Top passers

- BAL – Joe Flacco – 17/34, 195 yards, 2 INT
- CIN – Andy Dalton – 21/28, 266 yards, INT

Top rushers

- BAL – Justin Forsett – 17 rushes, 68 yards
- CIN – Giovani Bernard – 16 rushes, 45 yards

Top receivers

- BAL – Lorenzo Taliaferro – 2 receptions, 42 yards
- CIN – Mohamed Sanu – 5 receptions, 125 yards

With the win, the Bengals improved to 4-2-1, and swept the Ravens for the first time since 2009.

==== Week 9: vs. Jacksonville Jaguars ====
Week Nine: Jacksonville Jaguars at Cincinnati Bengals – Game summary

Quarter	1	2	3	4	Total
Jaguars	3	0	7	13	23
Bengals	0	12	7	14	33

at Paul Brown Stadium, Cincinnati, Ohio

- Date: November 2
- Game time: 1:00 pm. EST
- Game weather: 42 °F (6 °C), sunny
- Game attendance: 60,057
- Referee: Ron Torbert
- TV announcers (CBS): Spero Dedes and Solomon Wilcots
- Recap, Gamebook

Game information

First quarter

- JAX – Josh Scobee 25-yard field goal, 1:21. Jaguars 3–0. Drive: 10 plays, 79 yards, 5:17.

Second quarter

- CIN – Mohamed Sanu 19-yard pass from Andy Dalton (Mike Nugent kick), 11:48. Bengals 7–3. Drive: 10 plays, 80 yards, 4:33.
- CIN – Mike Nugent 31-yard field goal, 4:25. Bengals 10–3. Drive: 10 plays, 49 yards, 5:29.
- CIN – Bryan Anger punt blocked out of bounds in endzone for a safety, 2:58. Bengals 12–3.

Third quarter

- CIN – Jeremy Hill 1-yard run (Mike Nugent kick), 10:33. Bengals 19–3. Drive: 8 plays, 62 yards, 4:27.
- JAX – Allen Hurns 40-yard pass from Blake Bortles (Josh Scobee kick), 9:36. Bengals 19–10. Drive: 3 plays, 64 yards, 0:57.

Fourth quarter

- CIN – A. J. Green 18-yard pass from Andy Dalton (Mike Nugent kick), 13:54. Bengals 26–10. Drive: 2 plays, 23 yards, 0:45.
- JAX – Allen Hurns 18-yard pass from Blake Bortles (pass failed), 9:55. Bengals 26–16. Drive: 8 plays, 75 yards, 3:59.
- JAX – Denard Robinson 5-yard run (Josh Scobee kick), 8:13. Bengals 26–23. Drive: 2 plays, 7 yards, 0:43.
- CIN – Jeremy Hill 60-yard run (Mike Nugent kick), 8:04. Bengals 33–23. Drive: 1 play, 60 yards, 0:09.

Top passers

- JAX – Blake Bortles – 22/33, 247 yards, 2 TD, INT
- CIN – Andy Dalton – 19/31, 233 yards, 2 TD, 2 INT

Top rushers

- JAX – Denard Robinson – 17 rushes, 94 yards, TD
- CIN – Jeremy Hill – 24 rushes, 154 yards, 2 TD

Top receivers

- JAX – Allen Hurns – 7 receptions, 112 yards, 2 TD
- CIN – Mohamed Sanu – 4 receptions, 95 yards, TD

With their 4th straight win over the Jaguars, the Bengals went to 5-2-1.

==== Week 10: vs. Cleveland Browns ====
Week Ten: Cleveland Browns at Cincinnati Bengals – Game summary

Quarter	1	2	3	4	Total
Browns	7	10	7	0	24
Bengals	3	0	0	0	3

at Paul Brown Stadium, Cincinnati, Ohio

- Date: November 6
- Game time: 8:25 pm. EST
- Game weather: 42 °F (6 °C), cloudy
- Game attendance: 65,871
- Referee: Jeff Triplette
- TV announcers (NFLN): Jim Nantz, Phil Simms and Tracy Wolfson
- Recap, Gamebook

Game information

First quarter

- CLE – Ben Tate 4-yard run (Billy Cundiff kick), 10:40. Browns 7–0. Drive: 5 plays, 18 yards, 2:38.
- CIN – Mike Nugent 43-yard field goal, 6:18. Browns 7–3. Drive: 7 plays, 7 yards, 1:22.

Second quarter

- CLE – Isaiah Crowell 2-yard run (Billy Cundiff kick), 12:57. Browns 14–3. Drive: 8 plays, 59 yards, 4:01.
- CLE – Billy Cundiff 32-yard field goal, 3:59. Browns 17–3. Drive: 14 plays, 63 yards, 5:56.

Third quarter

- CLE – Terrance West 1-yard run (Billy Cundiff kick), 4:46. Browns 24–3. Drive: 10 plays, 63 yards, 5:30.

Fourth quarter

- No scoring plays.

Top passers

- CLE – Brian Hoyer – 15/23, 198 yards
- CIN – Andy Dalton – 10/33, 86 yards, 3 INT

Top rushers

- CLE – Terrance West – 26 rushes, 94 yards, TD
- CIN – Jeremy Hill – 12 rushes, 55 yards

Top receivers

- CLE – Miles Austin – 5 receptions, 48 yards
- CIN – Jermaine Gresham – 3 receptions, 29 yards

Andy Dalton would post a passer rating of 2.0 in this game, as the Bengals went down easily to the Browns 24-3. With the loss, the Bengals fell to 5-3-1.

==== Week 11: at New Orleans Saints ====
Week Eleven: Cincinnati Bengals at New Orleans Saints – Game summary

Quarter	1	2	3	4	Total
Bengals	7	6	7	7	27
Saints	3	0	0	7	10

at Mercedes-Benz Superdome, New Orleans, Louisiana

- Date: November 16
- Game time: 1:00 pm. EST/12:00 p.m. CST
- Game weather: Played indoors (dome stadium)
- Game attendance: 73,073
- Referee: Craig Wrolstad
- TV announcers (CBS): Greg Gumbel, Trent Green and Evan Washburn
- Recap, Gamebook

Game information

First quarter

- NO – Shayne Graham 31-yard field goal, 8:53. Saints 3–0. Drive: 14 plays, 67 yards, 6:09.
- CIN – Jermaine Gresham 12-yard pass from Andy Dalton (Mike Nugent kick), 3:14. Bengals 7–3. Drive: 12 plays, 77 yards, 5:39.

Second quarter

- CIN – Mike Nugent 22-yard field goal, 2:52. Bengals 10–3. Drive: 15 plays, 94 yards, 7:25.
- CIN – Mike Nugent 42-yard field goal, 0:00. Bengals 13–3. Drive: 3 plays, 60 yards, 0:57.

Third quarter

- CIN – Jermaine Gresham 1-yard pass from Andy Dalton (Mike Nugent kick), 6:03. Bengals 20–3. Drive: 8 plays, 50 yards, 3:46.

Fourth quarter

- NO – Kenny Stills 9-yard pass from Drew Brees (Shayne Graham kick), 14:56. Bengals 20–10. Drive: 12 plays, 80 yards, 6:07.
- CIN – A. J. Green 24-yard pass from Andy Dalton (Mike Nugent kick), 11:29. Bengals 27–10. Drive: 7 plays, 80 yards, 3:27.

Top passers

- CIN – Andy Dalton – 16/22, 220 yards, 3 TD
- NO – Drew Brees – 33/41, 255 yards, TD

Top rushers

- CIN – Jeremy Hill – 27 rushes, 152 yards
- NO – Mark Ingram – 23 rushes, 67 yards

Top receivers

- CIN – A. J. Green – 6 receptions, 127 yards, TD
- NO – Marques Colston – 4 receptions, 56 yards

With the win, the Bengals went to 6-3-1.

==== Week 12: at Houston Texans ====
Week Twelve: Cincinnati Bengals at Houston Texans – Game summary

Quarter	1	2	3	4	Total
Bengals	7	2	7	6	22
Texans	0	3	10	0	13

at NRG Stadium, Houston, Texas

- Date: November 23
- Game time: 1:00 pm. EST/12:00 pm. CST
- Game weather: 71 °F (22 °C), sunny (retractable roof open)
- Game attendance: 71,777
- Referee: Terry McAulay
- TV announcers (CBS): Ian Eagle, Dan Fouts and Jenny Dell
- Recap, Gamebook

Game information

First quarter

- CIN – Mohamed Sanu 6-yard pass from Andy Dalton (Mike Nugent kick), 1:19. Bengals 7–0. Drive: 13 plays, 94 yards, 6:19.

Second quarter

- CIN – Alfred Blue tackled in endzone by Geno Atkins for a safety, 8:57. Bengals 9–0.
- HOU – Randy Bullock 36-yard field goal, 1:45. Bengals 9–3. Drive: 15 plays, 67 yards, 5:04.

Third quarter

- CIN – Jeremy Hill 2-yard run (Mike Nugent kick), 11:48. Bengals 16–3. Drive: 6 plays, 22 yards, 2:58.
- HOU – Johnathan Joseph 60-yard interception return (Randy Bullock kick), 7:19. Bengals 16–10.
- HOU – Randy Bullock 25-yard field goal, 1:48. Bengals 16–13. Drive: 12 plays, 75 yards, 4:26.

Fourth quarter

- CIN – Mike Nugent 31-yard field goal, 8:48. Bengals 19–13. Drive: 17 plays, 71 yards, 8:00.
- CIN – Mike Nugent 49-yard field goal, 1:55. Bengals 22–13. Drive: 8 plays, 37 yards, 3:01.

Top passers

- CIN – Andy Dalton – 24/35, 233 yards, TD, INT
- HOU – Ryan Mallett – 21/45, 189 yards, INT

Top rushers

- CIN – Jeremy Hill – 18 rushes, 87 yards, TD
- HOU – Alfred Blue – 16 rushes, 46 yards

Top receivers

- CIN – A. J. Green – 12 receptions, 121 yards
- HOU – Garrett Graham – 4 receptions, 41 yards

With the win, the Bengals went to 7-3-1.

==== Week 13: at Tampa Bay Buccaneers ====
Week Thirteen: Cincinnati Bengals at Tampa Bay Buccaneers – Game summary

Quarter	1	2	3	4	Total
Bengals	0	7	7	0	14
Buccaneers	3	7	0	3	13

at Raymond James Stadium, Tampa, Florida

- Date: November 30
- Game time: 1:00 pm. EST
- Game weather: 77 °F (25 °C), sunny
- Game attendance: 56,340
- Referee: Bill Leavy
- TV announcers (CBS): Spero Dedes, Solomon Wilcots and Chris Fischer
- Recap, Gamebook

Game information

First quarter

- TB – Patrick Murray 32-yard field goal, 12:24. Buccaneers 3–0. Drive: 4 plays, -5 yards, 2:22.

Second quarter

- TB – Doug Martin 7-yard run (Patrick Murray kick), 12:00. Buccaneers 10–0. Drive: 9 plays, 71 yards, 5:15.
- CIN – Andy Dalton 5-yard run (Mike Nugent kick), 1:08. Buccaneers 10–7. Drive: 8 plays, 64 yards, 4:03.

Third quarter

- CIN – A. J. Green 13-yard pass from Andy Dalton (Mike Nugent kick), 2:04. Bengals 14–10. Drive: 10 plays, 63 yards, 5:05.

Fourth quarter

- TB – Patrick Murray 42-yard field goal, 14:12. Bengals 14–13. Drive: 4 plays, 7 yards, 2:52.

Top passers

- CIN – Andy Dalton – 19/27, 176 yards, TD, 3 INT
- TB – Josh McCown – 15/29, 190 yards, INT

Top rushers

- CIN – Giovani Bernard – 10 rushes, 49 yards
- TB – Doug Martin – 18 rushes, 58 yards, TD

Top receivers

- CIN – James Wright – 3 receptions, 59 yards
- TB – Mike Evans – 4 receptions, 49 yards

With the win, the Bengals went to 8-3-1. They also won 3 consecutive road games for the first time in franchise history. They also defeated the Bucs for the first time since 1989.

==== Week 14: vs. Pittsburgh Steelers ====
Week Fourteen: Pittsburgh Steelers at Cincinnati Bengals – Game summary

Quarter	1	2	3	4	Total
Steelers	0	10	7	25	42
Bengals	0	14	7	0	21

at Paul Brown Stadium, Cincinnati, Ohio

- Date: December 7
- Game time: 1:00 pm. EST
- Game weather: 39 °F (4 °C), cloudy
- Game attendance: 65,512
- Referee: Tony Corrente
- TV announcers (CBS): Ian Eagle, Dan Fouts and Jenny Dell
- Recap, Gamebook

Game information

First quarter

- No scoring plays.

Second quarter

- PIT – Heath Miller 1-yard pass from Ben Roethlisberger (Shaun Suisham kick), 11:17. Steelers 7–0. Drive: 9 plays, 75 yards, 4:29.
- CIN – Jermaine Gresham 10-yard pass from Andy Dalton (Mike Nugent kick), 9:06. Tied 7–7. Drive: 5 plays, 80 yards, 2:11.
- CIN – Andy Dalton 20-yard run (Mike Nugent kick), 2:57. Bengals 14–7. Drive: 10 plays, 80 yards, 4:45.
- PIT – Shaun Suisham 22-yard field goal, 0:11. Bengals 14–10. Drive: 12 plays, 81 yards, 2:46.

Third quarter

- PIT – Le'Veon Bell 10-yard pass from Ben Roethlisberger (Shaun Suisham kick), 5:24. Steelers 17–14. Drive: 10 plays, 80 yards, 5:46.
- CIN – A. J. Green 81-yard pass from Andy Dalton (Mike Nugent kick), 0:00. Bengals 21–17. Drive: 2 plays, 84 yards, 0:50.

Fourth quarter

- PIT – Shaun Suisham 44-yard field goal, 13:32. Bengals 21–20. Drive: 5 plays, 54 yards, 1:28.
- PIT – Le'Veon Bell 13-yard run (Ben Roethlisberger-Heath Miller pass), 11:27. Steelers 28–21. Drive: 4 plays, 24 yards, 1:18.
- PIT – Martavis Bryant 94-yard pass from Ben Roethlisberger (Shaun Suisham kick), 8:31. Steelers 35–21. Drive: 1 play, 94 yards, 0:12.
- PIT – Le'Veon Bell 22-yard run (Shaun Suisham kick), 5:09. Steelers 42–21. Drive: 6 plays, 50 yards, 2:19.

Top passers

- PIT – Ben Roethlisberger – 25/39, 350 yards, 3 TD
- CIN – Andy Dalton – 21/29, 302 yards, 2 TD

Top rushers

- PIT – Le'Veon Bell – 26 rushes, 185 yards, 2 TD
- CIN – Jeremy Hill – 8 rushes, 46 yards

Top receivers

- PIT – Antonio Brown – 9 receptions, 117 yards
- CIN – A. J. Green – 11 receptions, 224 yards, TD

The Bengals would surrender 25 points in the 4th quarter in this loss. With the loss, the Bengals fell to 8-4-1.

==== Week 15: at Cleveland Browns ====
Week Fifteen: Cincinnati Bengals at Cleveland Browns – Game summary

Quarter	1	2	3	4	Total
Bengals	10	10	3	7	30
Browns	0	0	0	0	0

at FirstEnergy Stadium, Cleveland, Ohio

- Date: December 14
- Game time: 1:00 pm. EST
- Game weather: 43 °F (6 °C), overcast
- Game attendance: 67,431
- Referee: Walt Anderson
- TV announcers (Fox): Kevin Burkhardt, John Lynch and Pam Oliver
- Recap, Gamebook

Game information

First quarter

- CIN – Jeremy Hill 2-yard run (Mike Nugent kick), 7:53. Bengals 7–0. Drive: 14 plays, 81 yards, 7:07.
- CIN – Mike Nugent 44-yard field goal, 1:57. Bengals 10–0. Drive: 9 plays, 46 yards, 3:39.

Second quarter

- CIN – Jeremy Hill 16-yard run (Mike Nugent kick), 13:11. Bengals 17–0. Drive: 5 plays, 36 yards, 1:57.
- CIN – Mike Nugent 44-yard field goal, 10:20. Bengals 20–0. Drive: 4 plays, 7 yards, 0:54.

Third quarter

- CIN – Mike Nugent 34-yard field goal, 2:35. Bengals 23–0. Drive: 11 plays, 30 yards, 6:39.

Fourth quarter

- CIN – Rex Burkhead 10-yard run (Mike Nugent kick), 0:23. Bengals 30–0. Drive: 14 plays, 86 yards, 8:44.

Top passers

- CIN – Andy Dalton – 14/24, 117 yards, INT
- CLE – Johnny Manziel – 10/18, 80 yards, 2 INT

Top rushers

- CIN – Jeremy Hill – 25 rushes, 148 yards, 2 TD
- CLE – Terrance West – 5 rushes, 23 yards

Top receivers

- CIN – A. J. Green – 5 receptions, 49 yards
- CLE – Josh Gordon – 3 receptions, 48 yards

Johnny Manziel made his first career NFL start in this game. With the shutout win, the Bengals went to 9-4-1. They also posted their first shutout win since 2008 (also against the Browns).

==== Week 16: vs. Denver Broncos ====
Week Sixteen: Denver Broncos at Cincinnati Bengals – Game summary

Quarter	1	2	3	4	Total
Broncos	7	0	21	0	28
Bengals	7	13	7	10	37

at Paul Brown Stadium, Cincinnati, Ohio

- Date: December 22
- Game time: 8:30 pm. EST
- Game weather: 47 °F (8 °C), cloudy
- Game attendance: 66,107
- Referee: Bill Vinovich
- TV announcers (ESPN): Mike Tirico, Jon Gruden and Lisa Salters
- Recap, Gamebook

Game information

First quarter

- DEN – Aqib Talib 33-yard interception return (Connor Barth kick), 10:32. Broncos 7–0.
- CIN – Jeremy Hill 85-yard run (Mike Nugent kick), 10:09. Tied 7–7. Drive: 1 play, 85 yards, 0:23.

Second quarter

- CIN – Mike Nugent 37-yard field goal, 10:23. Bengals 10–7. Drive: 10 plays, 26 yards, 5:23.
- CIN – Jermaine Gresham 2-yard pass from Andy Dalton (Mike Nugent kick), 7:56. Bengals 17–7. Drive: 4 plays, 22 yards, 1:54.
- CIN – Mike Nugent 49-yard field goal, 1:03. Bengals 20–7. Drive: 10 plays, 54 yards, 3:27.

Third quarter

- DEN – C. J. Anderson 1-yard run (Connor Barth kick), 14:12. Bengals 20–14. Drive: 3 plays, 21 yards, 0:48.
- CIN – Giovani Bernard 22-yard pass from Andy Dalton (Mike Nugent kick), 12:35. Bengals 27–14. Drive: 3 plays, 27 yards, 1:37.
- DEN – Emmanuel Sanders 4-yard pass from Peyton Manning (Connor Barth kick), 9:08. Bengals 27–21. Drive: 9 plays, 79 yards, 3:27.
- DEN – Emmanuel Sanders 5-yard pass from Peyton Manning (Connor Barth kick), 1:29. Broncos 28–27. Drive: 8 plays, 91 yards, 3:31.

Fourth quarter

- CIN – Mike Nugent 23-yard field goal, 7:49. Bengals 30–28. Drive: 4 plays, 7 yards, 1:54.
- CIN – Dre Kirkpatrick 30-yard interception return (Mike Nugent kick), 2:41. Bengals 37–28.

Top passers

- DEN – Peyton Manning – 28/42, 311 yards, 2 TD, 4 INT
- CIN – Andy Dalton – 17/25, 146 yards, 2 TD, INT

Top rushers

- DEN – C. J. Anderson – 18 rushes, 83 yards, TD
- CIN – Jeremy Hill – 22 rushes, 147 yards, TD

Top receivers

- DEN – Demaryius Thomas – 7 receptions, 115 yards
- CIN – Jermaine Gresham – 9 receptions, 62 yards, TD

The Bengals defense would intercept Peyton Manning 4 times in the game, including 2 by Dre Kirkpatrick in the 4th quarter. With the win, the Bengals improved to 10-4-1. They also defeated Peyton Manning for the first time.

==== Week 17: at Pittsburgh Steelers ====
Week Seventeen: Cincinnati Bengals at Pittsburgh Steelers – Game summary

Quarter	1	2	3	4	Total
Bengals	7	3	0	7	17
Steelers	7	13	0	7	27

at Heinz Field, Pittsburgh, Pennsylvania

- Date: December 28
- Game time: 8:30 pm. EST
- Game weather: 37 °F (3 °C), cloudy
- Game attendance: 64,697
- Referee: Ed Hochuli
- TV announcers (NBC): Al Michaels, Cris Collinsworth and Michele Tafoya
- Recap, Gamebook

Game information

First quarter

- PIT – Antonio Brown 71-yard punt return (Shaun Suisham kick), 10:50. Steelers 7–0.
- CIN – Giovani Bernard 17-yard pass from Andy Dalton (Mike Nugent kick), 2:43. Tied 7–7. Drive: 7 players, 42 yards, 4:01.

Second quarter

- CIN – Mike Nugent 39-yard field goal, 12:32. Bengals 10–7. Drive: 7 plays, 13 yards, 3:09.
- PIT – Shaun Suisham 29-yard field goal, 7:36. Tied 10–10. Drive: 9 plays, 69 yards, 4:56.
- PIT – Martavis Bryant 21-yard pass from Ben Roethlisberger (Shaun Suisham kick), 5:52. Steelers 17–10. Drive: 2 plays, 28 yards, 0:46.
- PIT – Shaun Suisham 25-yard field goal, 0:40. Steelers 20–10. Drive: 11 plays, 70 yards, 1:37.

Third quarter

- No scoring plays.

Fourth quarter

- CIN – Jermaine Gresham 5-yard pass from Andy Dalton (Mike Nugent kick), 11:14. Steelers 20–17. Drive: 15 plays, 89 yards, 7:29.
- PIT – Antonio Brown 63-yard pass from Ben Roethlisberger (Shaun Suisham kick), 2:50. Steelers 27–17. Drive: 3 plays, 70 yards, 1:01.

Top passers

- CIN – Andy Dalton – 27/38, 244 yards, 2 TD, 2 INT
- PIT – Ben Roethlisberger – 24/38, 317 yards, 2 TD, INT

Top rushers

- CIN – Jeremy Hill – 23 rushes, 100 yards
- PIT – Le'Veon Bell – 8 rushes, 20 yards

Top receivers

- CIN – A. J. Green – 8 receptions, 82 yards
- PIT – Antonio Brown – 7 receptions, 128 yards, TD

With the loss, the Bengals ended their season at 10-5-1. They would also finish in 2nd place by virtue of not only the Steelers sweep, but also being 1 game behind.

=== Postseason ===
==== AFC Wild Card Playoffs: at (4) Indianapolis Colts ====
AFC Wild Card Playoffs: (5) Cincinnati Bengals at (4) Indianapolis Colts – Game summary

Quarter	1	2	3	4	Total
Bengals	7	3	0	0	10
Colts	7	6	10	3	26

at Lucas Oil Stadium, Indianapolis, Indiana

- Date: January 4, 2015
- Game time: 1:05 p.m. EST
- Game weather: Played indoors (retractable roof closed)
- Game attendance: 63,385
- Referee: Carl Cheffers
- TV announcers (CBS): Jim Nantz, Phil Simms and Tracy Wolfson
- Recap, Gamebook

Game information

First quarter

- IND – Dan Herron 2-yard run (Adam Vinatieri kick), 11:05. Colts 7–0. Drive: 9 plays, 71 yards, 3:55.
- CIN – Jeremy Hill 1-yard run (Mike Nugent kick), 1:28. Tied 7–7. Drive: 9 plays, 74 yards, 4:26.

Second quarter

- IND – Adam Vinatieri 38-yard field goal, 12:41. Colts 10–7. Drive: 11 plays, 71 yards, 3:41.
- IND – Adam Vinatieri 29-yard field goal, 8:34. Colts 13–7. Drive: 6 plays, 53 yards, 2:17.
- CIN – Mike Nugent 57-yard field goal, 0:10. Colts 13–10. Drive: 7 plays, 20 yards, 1:39.

Third quarter

- IND – Donte Moncrief 36-yard pass from Andrew Luck (Adam Vinatieri kick), 7:48. Colts 20–10. Drive: 6 plays, 61 yards, 2:06.
- IND – Adam Vinatieri 22-yard field goal, 1:31. Colts 23–10. Drive: 10 plays, 53 yards, 4:47.

Fourth quarter

- IND – Adam Vinatieri 53-yard field goal, 11:31. Colts 26–10. Drive: 6 plays, 12 yards, 3:19.

Top passers

- CIN – Andy Dalton – 18/35, 155 yards
- IND – Andrew Luck – 31/44, 376 yards, TD

Top rushers

- CIN – Jeremy Hill – 13 rushes, 47 yards, TD
- IND – Dan Herron – 12 rushes, 56 yards, TD

Top receivers

- CIN – Giovani Bernard – 8 receptions, 46 yards
- IND – T.Y. Hilton – 6 receptions, 103 yards

With the loss, the Bengals endured their 7th straight playoff loss dating back to 1990.

== Standings ==
=== Division ===
AFC North
	W	L	T	PCT	DIV	CONF	PF	PA	STK
^{(3)} Pittsburgh Steelers	11	5	0	.688	4–2	9–3	436	368	W4
^{(5)} Cincinnati Bengals	10	5	1	.656	3–3	7–5	365	344	L1
^{(6)} Baltimore Ravens	10	6	0	.625	3–3	6–6	409	302	W1
Cleveland Browns	7	9	0	.438	2–4	4–8	299	337	L5

=== Conference ===
AFC
#	Team	Division	W	L	T	PCT	DIV	CONF	SOS	SOV	STK
Division leaders
1 (Note: New England defeated Denver head-to-head (Week 9, 43–21).)	New England Patriots	East	12	4	0	.750	4–2	9–3	.514	.487	L1
2	Denver Broncos	West	12	4	0	.750	6–0	10–2	.521	.484	W1
3 (Note: Pittsburgh defeated Indianapolis head-to-head (Week 8, 51–34).)	Pittsburgh Steelers	North	11	5	0	.688	4–2	9–3	.451	.486	W4
4	Indianapolis Colts	South	11	5	0	.688	6–0	9–3	.479	.372	W1
Wild Cards
5	Cincinnati Bengals	North	10	5	1	.656	3–3	7–5	.498	.425	L1
6	Baltimore Ravens	North	10	6	0	.625	3–3	6–6	.475	.378	W1
Did not qualify for the postseason
7 (Note: Kansas City finished ahead of San Diego in the AFC West based on head-to-head sweep (Week 7, 23–20; Week 17, 19–7). Houston finished ahead of Kansas City and Buffalo based on conference record. Kansas City finished ahead of Buffalo based on head-to-head victory (Week 10, 17–13). San Diego finished ahead of Buffalo based on head-to-head victory (Week 3, 22–10).)	Houston Texans	South	9	7	0	.563	4–2	8–4	.447	.299	W2
8	Kansas City Chiefs	West	9	7	0	.563	3–3	7–5	.512	.500	W1
9	San Diego Chargers	West	9	7	0	.563	2–4	6–6	.512	.403	L1
10	Buffalo Bills	East	9	7	0	.563	4–2	5–7	.516	.486	W1
11	Miami Dolphins	East	8	8	0	.500	3–3	6–6	.512	.406	L1
12	Cleveland Browns	North	7	9	0	.438	2–4	4–8	.479	.371	L5
13	New York Jets	East	4	12	0	.250	1–5	4–8	.543	.375	W1
14 (Note: Jacksonville finished ahead of Oakland based on record vs. common opponents (1–4 to 0–5).)	Jacksonville Jaguars	South	3	13	0	.188	1–5	2–10	.514	.313	L1
15	Oakland Raiders	West	3	13	0	.188	1–5	2–10	.570	.542	L1
16	Tennessee Titans	South	2	14	0	.125	1–5	2–10	.506	.375	L10
Tiebreakers (Note: When breaking ties for three or more teams under the NFL's rules, they are first broken within divisions, then comparing only the highest ranked remaining team from each division.)
