= 2014 Baltimore Ravens season =

NFL team season

- Owner: Stephen Bisciotti
- General manager: Ozzie Newsome
- Head coach: John Harbaugh
- Offensive coordinator: Gary Kubiak
- Defensive coordinator: Dean Pees
- Home stadium: M&T Bank Stadium

Results
- Record: 10–6
- Division place: 3rd AFC North
- Playoffs: Won Wild Card Playoffs (at Steelers) 30–17; Lost Divisional Playoffs (at Patriots) 31–35
- Pro Bowlers: RB Justin Forsett; G Marshal Yanda; OLB Elvis Dumervil; MLB C. J. Mosley

Uniform
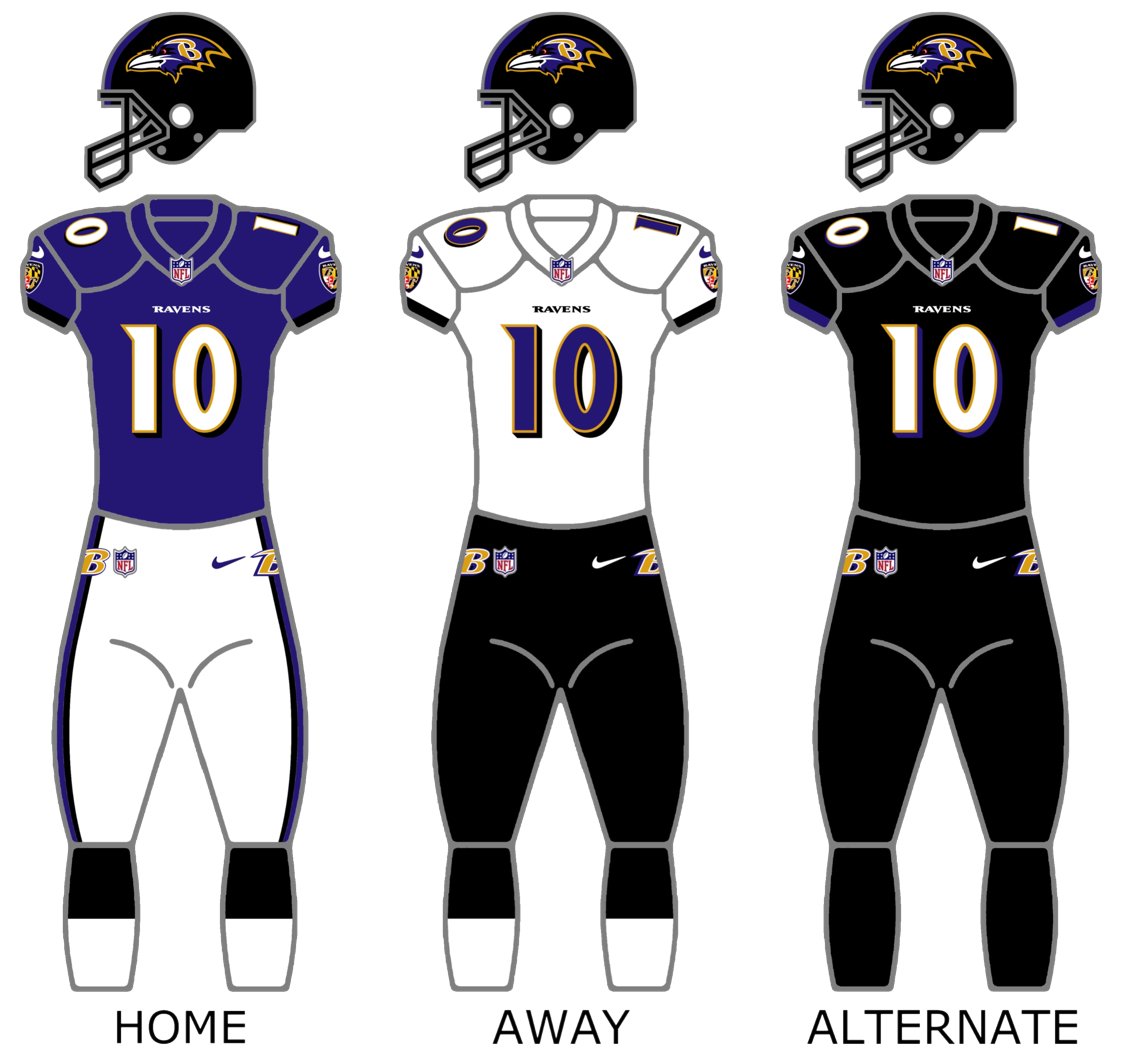

The 2014 season was the Baltimore Ravens' 19th in the National Football League (NFL) and their seventh under head coach John Harbaugh. The Ravens improved upon their 8–8 record from 2013, when they missed the playoffs for the first time since 2007. Additionally, the Ravens scored a franchise record 409 points and quarterback Joe Flacco passed for a career-high 27 touchdowns and 3,986 yards.

The Ravens clinched the sixth seed in the AFC playoffs following their Week 17 win against the Browns. This was their first time making the playoffs in the post-Ray Lewis era, having failed the make the playoffs the previous season. After winning the AFC wild card game against their divisional rival Pittsburgh Steelers, the Ravens were ultimately defeated in the AFC Divisional Round by the eventual Super Bowl champion New England Patriots, failing to upset them on the road in a repeat of the Ravens' Super Bowl XLVII winning season. After this season, the Ravens would not qualify to make the postseason again until 2018.

The season was not without controversy, however, as TMZ released a video of star running back Ray Rice punching his wife Janay Palmer then dragging her out of the Revel Casino's elevator in Atlantic City. On September 8, 2014, after seeing the video, the Ravens released Rice. He never played another down in the NFL after that.

== Personnel ==
=== 2014 draft class ===
2014 Baltimore Ravens draft
Round	Pick	Player	Position	College	Notes
1	17	C.J. Mosley *	LB	Alabama	
2	48	Timmy Jernigan	DT	Florida State	
3	79	Terrence Brooks	FS	Florida State	
3	99	Crockett Gillmore	TE	Colorado State	
4	134	Brent Urban	DT	Virginia	
4	138	Lorenzo Taliaferro	FB	Coastal Carolina	
5	175	John Urschel	G	Penn State	
6	194	Keith Wenning	QB	Ball State	
7	218	Michael Campanaro	WR	Wake Forest	
Made roster † Pro Football Hall of Fame * Made at least one Pro Bowl during career

Draft trades

- The Ravens finished with the same record and strength of schedule as the Dallas Cowboys at the end of the 2013 season. The tiebreaker was determined by way of a coin flip at the NFL Scouting Combine, with the Cowboys selecting 16th in the first round and the Ravens selecting 17th.
- The Ravens traded their original fourth- and fifth-round selections (Nos. 114 and 159 overall, respectively) to the Jacksonville Jaguars in exchange for offensive tackle Eugene Monroe.
- The Ravens traded their original seventh-round selection (No. 232 overall) to the Indianapolis Colts in exchange for center A. Q. Shipley. || 218 (Note: The Ravens acquired this seventh-round selection (No. 218 overall) in a trade that sent the team's 2015 sixth-round selection to the Cleveland Browns.)

=== Staff ===
2014 Baltimore Ravens staff
Front office: Owner – Steve Bisciotti; President – Dick Cass; Executive vice president/general manager – Ozzie Newsome; Assistant general manager – Eric DeCosta; Senior vice president of football administration – Pat Moriarty; Director of pro personnel – Vince Newsome; Director of college scouting – Joe Hortiz; Senior personnel assistant – George Kokinis; Assistant director of pro personnel – Chad Alexander; Executive assistant/football information manager – Megan McLaughlin; Head coaches: Head coach – John Harbaugh; Assistant to the head coach – Dan Parsons; Offensive coaches: Offensive coordinator – Gary Kubiak; Quarterbacks – Rick Dennison; Running backs – Thomas Hammock; Wide receivers – Bobby Engram; Tight ends – Brian Pariani; Offensive line – Juan Castillo; Assistant offensive line – Todd Washington; Senior offensive assistant – Craig Ver Steeg; Offensive quality control – Jay Harbaugh	Defensive coaches: Defensive coordinator – Dean Pees; Defensive line – Clarence Brooks; Linebackers – Ted Monachino; Inside linebackers – Don Martindale; Secondary – Steve Spagnuolo; Assistant secondary – Chris Hewitt; Defensive quality control/linebackers – Matt Weiss; Defensive coaching assistant – Drew Wilkins; Special teams coaches: Associate head coach/special teams coordinator – Jerry Rosburg; Kicking consultant – Randy Brown; Strength and conditioning: Strength and conditioning – Bob Rogucki; Assistant strength and conditioning – Juney Barnett; Cross-training specialist – Billy DeLorbe

=== Final roster ===
2014 Baltimore Ravens roster
Quarterbacks (QB): 5 Joe Flacco; 2 Tyrod Taylor; Running backs (RB): 29 Justin Forsett; 44 Kyle Juszczyk FB; 30 Bernard Pierce; 43 Fitzgerald Toussaint; Wide receivers (WR): 11 Kamar Aiken; 14 Marlon Brown; 15 Michael Campanaro; 12 Jacoby Jones; 89 Steve Smith Sr.; 82 Torrey Smith; Tight ends (TE): 81 Owen Daniels; 80 Crockett Gillmore; 84 Phillip Supernaw	Offensive linemen (OL): 66 Gino Gradkowski G; 74 James Hurst T; 77 Ryan Jensen C; 60 Eugene Monroe T; 72 Kelechi Osemele G; 64 John Urschel G; 73 Marshal Yanda G; 53 Jeremy Zuttah C; Defensive linemen (DL): 99 Chris Canty DE; 62 Terrence Cody NT; 67 Lawrence Guy DE; 97 Timmy Jernigan DE; 93 DeAngelo Tyson DE; 79 Casey Walker NT; 98 Brandon Williams NT	Linebackers (LB): 59 Arthur Brown ILB; 58 Elvis Dumervil OLB; 50 Albert McClellan OLB; 90 Pernell McPhee OLB; 56 Steven Means OLB; 57 C. J. Mosley ILB; 54 Zach Orr ILB; 51 Daryl Smith ILB; 55 Terrell Suggs OLB; 91 Courtney Upshaw OLB; Defensive backs (DB): 23 Antoine Cason CB; 26 Matt Elam SS; 42 Chris Greenwood CB; 33 Will Hill SS; 41 Anthony Levine CB; 38 Rashaan Melvin CB; 36 Jeromy Miles FS; 24 Darian Stewart FS; 28 Brynden Trawick SS; 21 Lardarius Webb CB; Special teams (ST): 4 Sam Koch P; 48 Patrick Scales LS; 9 Justin Tucker K	Practice squad: 78 Marcel Jones T; 83 Alec Lemon WR; 65 Nate Menkin T; 32 Quinton Pointer CB; 45 Tauren Poole RB; 85 Allen Reisner TE; 86 Konrad Reuland TE (IR); 13 Aldrick Robinson WR; 35 Kiero Small FB; 63 J. J. Unga G; 10 Keith Wenning QB; Reserve: 68 Christo Bilukidi DE (IR); 31 Terrence Brooks FS (IR); 17 Jeremy Butler WR (IR); 46 Morgan Cox LS (IR); 37 Danny Gorrer CB (IR); 25 Asa Jackson CB (IR); 39 Tramain Jacobs CB (IR); 95 Kapron Lewis-Moore DE (IR); 47 Kevin McDermott LS (IR); 92 Haloti Ngata DE (Susp.); 88 Dennis Pitta TE (IR); 67 Will Rackley G (IR); 76 Jah Reid RT (IR); 38 Aaron Ross CB (IR); 22 Jimmy Smith CB (IR); 34 Lorenzo Taliaferro RB (IR); 96 Brent Urban DE (IR); 71 Rick Wagner RT (IR); Rookies in italics 53 active, 19 reserve, 10 practice squad

== Schedule ==
=== Preseason ===
Week	Date	Opponent	Result	Record	Venue	Recap
1	August 7	San Francisco 49ers	**W** 23–3	1–0	M&T Bank Stadium	Recap
2	August 16	at Dallas Cowboys	**W** 37–30	2–0	AT&T Stadium	Recap
3	August 23	Washington Redskins	**W** 23–17	3–0	M&T Bank Stadium	Recap
4	August 28	at New Orleans Saints	**W** 22–13	4–0	Mercedes-Benz Superdome	Recap

During the first preseason game vs the 49ers the Ravens won the third "Harbowl", as coach John Harbaugh defeated his brother Jim Harbaugh for the third time (following the Thanksgiving game in 2011 and Super Bowl XLVII).

=== Regular season ===
Week	Date	Opponent	Result	Record	Venue	Recap
1	September 7	**Cincinnati Bengals**	**L** 16–23	0–1	M&T Bank Stadium	Recap
2	September 11	**Pittsburgh Steelers**	**W** 26–6	1–1	M&T Bank Stadium	Recap
3	September 21	at **Cleveland Browns**	**W** 23–21	2–1	FirstEnergy Stadium	Recap
4	September 28	Carolina Panthers	**W** 38–10	3–1	M&T Bank Stadium	Recap
5	October 5	at Indianapolis Colts	**L** 13–20	3–2	Lucas Oil Stadium	Recap
6	October 12	at Tampa Bay Buccaneers	**W** 48–17	4–2	Raymond James Stadium	Recap
7	October 19	Atlanta Falcons	**W** 29–7	5–2	M&T Bank Stadium	Recap
8	October 26	at **Cincinnati Bengals**	**L** 24–27	5–3	Paul Brown Stadium	Recap
9	November 2	at **Pittsburgh Steelers**	**L** 23–43	5–4	Heinz Field	Recap
10	November 9	Tennessee Titans	**W** 21–7	6–4	M&T Bank Stadium	Recap
11	Bye					
12	November 24	at New Orleans Saints	**W** 34–27	7–4	Mercedes-Benz Superdome	Recap
13	November 30	San Diego Chargers	**L** 33–34	7–5	M&T Bank Stadium	Recap
14	December 7	at Miami Dolphins	**W** 28–13	8–5	Sun Life Stadium	Recap
15	December 14	Jacksonville Jaguars	**W** 20–12	9–5	M&T Bank Stadium	Recap
16	December 21	at Houston Texans	**L** 13–25	9–6	NRG Stadium	Recap
17	December 28	**Cleveland Browns**	**W** 20–10	10–6	M&T Bank Stadium	Recap

Note: Intra-division opponents are in bold text.

== Game summaries ==
=== Regular season ===
==== Week 1: vs. Cincinnati Bengals ====
Week One: Cincinnati Bengals at Baltimore Ravens – Game summary

Quarter	1	2	3	4	Total
Bengals	6	9	0	8	23
Ravens	0	0	7	9	16

at M&T Bank Stadium, Baltimore, Maryland

- Date: September 7
- Game time: 1:00 p.m. EDT
- Game weather: 74 °F (23 °C), partly cloudy
- Game attendance: 72,925
- Referee: Gene Steratore
- TV announcers (CBS): Spero Dedes and Solomon Wilcots
- Recap, Gamebook

Game information

First quarter

- CIN – Mike Nugent 49-yard field goal, 10:25. Bengals 3–0. Drive: 11 plays, 49 yards, 4:35.
- CIN – Mike Nugent 22-yard field goal, 1:25. Bengals 6–0. Drive: 6 plays, 25 yards, 2:42.

Second quarter

- CIN – Mike Nugent 28-yard field goal, 10:13. Bengals 9–0. Drive: 11 plays, 55 yards, 4:40.
- CIN – Mike Nugent 47-yard field goal, 4:36. Bengals 12–0. Drive: 8 plays, 27 yards, 3:15.
- CIN – Mike Nugent 38-yard field goal, 2:07. Bengals 15–0. Drive: 4 plays, 3 yards, 2:23.

Third quarter

- BAL – Justin Forsett 13-yard run (Justin Tucker kick), 2:20. Bengals 15–7. Drive: 10 plays, 82 yards, 4:25.

Fourth quarter

- BAL – Justin Tucker 38-yard field goal, 10:28. Bengals 15–10. Drive: 14 plays, 48 yards, 5:23.
- BAL – Steve Smith Sr. 80-yard pass from Joe Flacco (run failed), 5:46. Ravens 16–15. Drive: 6 plays, 92 yards, 2:43.
- CIN – A. J. Green 77-yard pass from Andy Dalton (Andy Dalton-Mohamed Sanu pass), 4:58. Bengals 23–16. Drive: 2 plays, 80 yards, 0:48.

Top passers

- CIN – Andy Dalton – 25/38, 301 yards, TD
- BAL – Joe Flacco – 35/62, 345 yards, TD, INT

Top rushers

- CIN – Giovani Bernard – 14 rushes, 48 yards
- BAL – Justin Forsett – 11 rushes, 85 yards, TD

Top receivers

- CIN – A. J. Green – 6 receptions, 131 yards, TD
- BAL – Dennis Pitta – 10 receptions, 89 yards

==== Week 2: vs. Pittsburgh Steelers ====
Week Two: Pittsburgh Steelers at Baltimore Ravens – Game summary

Quarter	1	2	3	4	Total
Steelers	0	3	3	0	6
Ravens	7	3	7	9	26

at M&T Bank Stadium, Baltimore, Maryland

- Date: September 11
- Game time: 8:25 pm. EDT
- Game weather: 82 °F (28 °C), partly cloudy
- Game attendance: 71,181
- Referee: Ed Hochuli
- TV announcers (CBS/NFLN): Jim Nantz, Phil Simms and Tracy Wolfson
- Recap, Gamebook

Game information

First quarter

- BAL – Owen Daniels 2-yard pass from Joe Flacco (Justin Tucker kick), 0:27. Ravens 7–0. Drive: 12 plays, 85 yards, 6:26.

Second quarter

- BAL – Justin Tucker 30-yard field goal, 8:01. Ravens 10–0. Drive: 12 plays, 65 yards, 5:32.
- PIT – Shaun Suisham 25-yard field goal, 2:50. Ravens 10–3. Drive: 11 plays, 73 yards, 5:11.

Third quarter

- PIT – Shaun Suisham 43-yard field goal, 10:30. Ravens 10–6. Drive: 6 plays, 27 yards, 2:56.
- BAL – Owen Daniels 1-yard pass from Joe Flacco (Justin Tucker kick), 3:58. Ravens 17–6. Drive: 12 plays, 80 yards, 6:32.

Fourth quarter

- BAL – Justin Tucker 23-yard field goal, 14:11. Ravens 20–6. Drive: 10 plays, 53 yards, 3:51.
- BAL – Justin Tucker 22-yard field goal, 11:14. Ravens 23–6. Drive: 6 plays, 16 yards, 2:46.
- BAL – Justin Tucker 20-yard field goal, 4:31. Ravens 26–6. Drive: 7 plays, 53 yards, 4:57.

Top passers

- PIT – Ben Roethlisberger – 22/37, 217 yards, INT
- BAL – Joe Flacco – 21/29, 166 yards, 2 TD

Top rushers

- PIT – Le'Veon Bell – 11 rushes, 59 yards
- BAL – Bernard Pierce – 22 rushes, 96 yards

Top receivers

- PIT – Antonio Brown – 7 receptions, 90 yards
- BAL – Steve Smith Sr. – 6 receptions, 71 yards

==== Week 3: at Cleveland Browns ====
Week Three: Baltimore Ravens at Cleveland Browns – Game summary

Quarter	1	2	3	4	Total
Ravens	3	7	7	6	23
Browns	7	0	14	0	21

at FirstEnergy Stadium, Cleveland, Ohio

- Date: September 21
- Game time: 1:00 pm. EDT
- Game weather: 71 °F (22 °C), partly sunny
- Game attendance: 67,407
- Referee: Bill Leavy
- TV announcers (CBS): Spero Dedes and Solomon Wilcots
- Recap, Gamebook

Game information

First quarter

- BAL - Justin Tucker 38-yard field goal, 9:11. Ravens 3–0. Drive: 12 plays, 55 yards, 5:49.
- CLE - Terrance West 1-yard run (Billy Cundiff kick), 3:15. Browns 7–3. Drive: 11 plays, 80 yards, 5:56.

Second quarter

- BAL - Kyle Juszczyk 9-yard pass from Joe Flacco (Justin Tucker kick), 7:24. Ravens 10–7. Drive: 10 plays, 80 yards, 6:05.

Third quarter

- CLE - Isaiah Crowell 14-yard run (Billy Cundiff kick), 10:01. Browns 14–10. Drive: 9 plays, 80 yards, 4:59.
- BAL - Lorenzo Taliaferro 1-yard run (Justin Tucker kick), 5:04. Ravens 17–14. Drive: 8 plays, 80 yards, 4:57.
- CLE - Miles Austin 4-yard pass from Brian Hoyer (Billy Cundiff kick), 0:13. Browns 21–17. Drive: 10 plays, 80 yards, 4:51.

Fourth quarter

- BAL - Justin Tucker 21-yard field goal, 5:00. Browns 21–20. Drive: 8 plays, 71 yards, 2:46.
- BAL - Justin Tucker 32-yard field goal, 0:00. Ravens 23–21. Drive: 6 plays, 37 yards, 1:58.

Top passers

- BAL – Joe Flacco – 19/31, 217 yards, TD, INT
- CLE – Brian Hoyer – 19/25, 290 yards, TD

Top rushers

- BAL – Lorenzo Taliaferro – 18 rushes, 91 yards, TD
- CLE – Isaiah Crowell – 11 rushes, 55 yards, TD

Top receivers

- BAL – Steve Smith Sr. – 5 receptions, 101 yards
- CLE – Andrew Hawkins – 7 receptions, 87 yards

==== Week 4: vs. Carolina Panthers ====
Week Four: Carolina Panthers at Baltimore Ravens – Game summary

Quarter	1	2	3	4	Total
Panthers	0	7	3	0	10
Ravens	0	21	7	10	38

at M&T Bank Stadium, Baltimore, Maryland

- Date: September 28
- Game time: 1:00 pm. EDT
- Game weather: 78 °F (26 °C), sunny
- Game attendance: 71,218
- Referee: Craig Wrolstad
- TV announcers (CBS): Greg Gumbel, Trent Green and Evan Washburn
- Recap, Gamebook

Game information

First quarter

- – No scoring plays.

Second quarter

- BAL – Steve Smith Sr. 61-yard pass from Joe Flacco (Justin Tucker kick), 13:12. Ravens 7–0. Drive: 5 plays, 80 yards, 2:30.
- CAR – Kelvin Benjamin 28-yard pass from Cam Newton (Graham Gano kick), 8:35. Tied 7–7. Drive: 10 plays, 80 yards, 4:37.
- BAL – Justin Forsett 11-yard run (Justin Tucker kick), 5:22. Ravens 14–7. Drive: 8 plays, 80 yards, 3:13.
- BAL – Steve Smith Sr. 21-yard pass from Joe Flacco (Justin Tucker kick), 1:53. Ravens 21–7. Drive: 7 plays, 68 yards, 2:36.

Third quarter

- BAL – Torrey Smith 24-yard pass from Joe Flacco (Justin Tucker kick), 9:51. Ravens 28–7. Drive: 10 plays, 80 yards, 5:09.
- CAR – Graham Gano 37-yard field goal, 3:30. Ravens 28–10. Drive: 12 plays, 64 yards, 6:21.

Fourth quarter

- BAL – Lorenzo Taliaferro 1-yard run (Justin Tucker kick), 11:34. Ravens 35–10. Drive: 12 plays, 80 yards, 6:56.
- BAL – Justin Tucker 30-yard field goal, 3:33. Ravens 38–10. Drive: 9 plays, 37 yards, 5:50.

Top passers

- CAR – Cam Newton – 14/25, 197 yards, TD
- BAL – Joe Flacco – 22/31, 327 yards, 3 TD

Top rushers

- CAR – DeAngelo Williams – 11 rushes, 34 yards
- BAL – Justin Forsett – 14 rushes, 66 yards, TD

Top receivers

- CAR – Jerricho Cotchery – 5 receptions, 80 yards
- BAL – Steve Smith Sr. – 7 receptions, 139 yards, 2 TD

==== Week 5: at Indianapolis Colts ====
Week Five: Baltimore Ravens at Indianapolis Colts – Game summary

Quarter	1	2	3	4	Total
Ravens	0	3	0	10	13
Colts	3	3	7	7	20

at Lucas Oil Stadium, Indianapolis, Indiana

- Date: October 5
- Game time: 1:00 pm. EDT
- Game weather: 53 °F (12 °C), cloudy (retractable roof open)
- Game attendance: 65,258
- Referee: Walt Anderson
- TV announcers (CBS): Kevin Harlan and Rich Gannon
- Recap, Gamebook

Game information

First quarter

- IND – Adam Vinatieri 38-yard field goal, 9:44. Colts 3–0. Drive: 4 plays, 2 yards, 0:49.

Second quarter

- IND – Adam Vinatieri 34-yard field goal, 0:35. Colts 6–0. Drive: 20 plays, 70 yards, 9:39.
- BAL – Justin Tucker 52-yard field goal, 0:00. Colts 6–3. Drive: 6 plays, 47 yards, 0:35.

Third quarter

- IND – Dwayne Allen 6-yard pass from Andrew Luck (Adam Vinatieri kick), 10:33. Colts 13–3. Drive: 7 plays, 33 yards, 2:47.

Fourth quarter

- BAL – Justin Tucker 27-yard field goal, 13:56. Colts 13–6. Drive: 4 plays, 3 yards, 0:47.
- IND – Andrew Luck 13-yard run (Adam Vinatieri kick), 8:56. Colts 20–6. Drive: 8 plays, 80 yards, 5:00.
- BAL – Justin Forsett 11-yard run (Justin Tucker kick), 7:16. Colts 20–13. Drive: 4 plays, 80 yards, 1:40.

Top passers

- BAL – Joe Flacco – 22/38, 235 yards, INT
- IND – Andrew Luck – 32/49, 312 yards, TD, 2 INT

Top rushers

- BAL – Justin Forsett – 6 rushes, 42 yards, TD
- IND – Ahmad Bradshaw – 15 rushes, 68 yards

Top receivers

- BAL – Owen Daniels – 5 receptions, 70 yards
- IND – T.Y. Hilton – 9 receptions, 90 yards

==== Week 6: at Tampa Bay Buccaneers ====
Week Six: Baltimore Ravens at Tampa Bay Buccaneers – Game summary

Quarter	1	2	3	4	Total
Ravens	28	10	7	3	48
Buccaneers	0	0	10	7	17

at Raymond James Stadium, Tampa, Florida

- Date: October 12
- Game time: 1:00 pm. EDT
- Game weather: 84 °F (29 °C), cloudy
- Game attendance: 60,041
- Referee: Jerome Boger
- TV announcers (CBS): Spero Dedes, Solomon Wilcots and Chris Fischer
- Recap, Gamebook

Game information

First quarter

- BAL – Torrey Smith 15-yard pass from Joe Flacco (Justin Tucker kick), 13:11. Ravens 7–0. Drive: 4 plays, 80 yards, 1:49.
- BAL – Torrey Smith 9-yard pass from Joe Flacco (Justin Tucker kick), 9:22. Ravens 14–0. Drive: 4 plays, 22 yards, 1:19.
- BAL – Kamar Aiken 17-yard pass from Joe Flacco (Justin Tucker kick), 5:00. Ravens 21–0. Drive: 7 plays, 50 yards, 2:44.
- BAL – Michael Campanaro 19-yard pass from Joe Flacco (Justin Tucker kick), 0:01. Ravens 28–0. Drive: 7 plays, 57 yards, 3:31.

Second quarter

- BAL – Steve Smith Sr. 56-yard pass from Joe Flacco (Justin Tucker kick), 13:57. Ravens 35–0. Drive: 2 plays, 59 yards, 0:44.
- BAL – Justin Tucker 46-yard field goal, 8:41. Ravens 38–0. Drive: 7 plays, 20 yards, 3:44.

Third quarter

- TB – Patrick Murray 47-yard field goal, 10:50. Ravens 38–3. Drive: 9 plays, 51 yards, 4:10.
- TB – Mike Evans 15-yard pass from Mike Glennon (Patrick Murray kick), 5:46. Ravens 38–10. Drive: 7 plays, 92 yards, 2:47.
- BAL – Bernard Pierce 4-yard run (Justin Tucker kick), 0:07. Ravens 45–10. Drive: 10 plays, 80 yards, 5:39.

Fourth quarter

- TB – Louis Murphy 3-yard pass from Mike Glennon (Patrick Murray kick), 12:19. Ravens 45–17. Drive: 6 plays, 76 yards, 2:48.
- BAL – Justin Tucker 49-yard field goal, 7:53. Ravens 48–17. Drive: 7 plays, 20 yards, 4:26.

Top passers

- BAL – Joe Flacco – 21/28, 306 yards, 5 TD
- TB – Mike Glennon – 24/44, 312 yards, 2 TD, INT

Top rushers

- BAL – Justin Forsett – 14 rushes, 111 yards
- TB – Doug Martin – 11 rushes, 45 yards

Top receivers

- BAL – Steve Smith Sr. – 5 receptions, 110 yards, TD
- TB – Louis Murphy – 7 receptions, 72 yards, TD

Joe Flacco would break an NFL record for fastest time for throwing 5 touchdown passes (16 minutes) since the AFL–NFL merger.

==== Week 7: vs. Atlanta Falcons ====
Week Seven: Atlanta Falcons at Baltimore Ravens – Game summary

Quarter	1	2	3	4	Total
Falcons	0	0	0	7	7
Ravens	7	10	3	9	29

at M&T Bank Stadium, Baltimore, Maryland

- Date: October 19
- Game time: 1:00 pm. EDT
- Game weather: 54 °F (12 °C), sunny
- Game attendance: 71,184
- Referee: Carl Cheffers
- TV announcers (Fox): Justin Kutcher, David Diehl and Laura Okmin
- Recap, Gamebook

Game information

First quarter

- BAL – Owen Daniels 5-yard pass from Joe Flacco (Justin Tucker kick), 11:47. Ravens 7–0. Drive: 5 plays, 52 yards, 1:49.

Second quarter

- BAL – Bernard Pierce 1-yard run (Justin Tucker kick), 2:38. Ravens 14–0. Drive: 9 plays, 58 yards, 4:18.
- BAL – Justin Tucker 38-yard field goal, 0:00. Ravens 17–0. Drive: 3 plays, 33 yards, 0:37.

Third quarter

- BAL – Justin Tucker 38-yard field goal, 11:28. Ravens 20–0. Drive: 7 plays, 61 yards, 3:32.

Fourth quarter

- ATL – Roddy White 4-yard pass from Matt Ryan (Matt Bryant kick), 7:12. Ravens 20–7. Drive: 10 plays, 90 yards, 2:45.
- BAL – Matt Ryan sacked in endzone by Terrell Suggs for a safety, 3:44. Ravens 22–7.
- BAL – Torrey Smith 39-yard pass from Joe Flacco (Justin Tucker kick), 1:46. Ravens 29–7. Drive: 4 plays, 40 yards, 1:58.

Top passers

- ATL – Matt Ryan – 29/48, 228 yards, TD
- BAL – Joe Flacco – 16/25, 258 yards, 2 TD, 2 INT

Top rushers

- ATL – Steven Jackson – 8 rushes, 22 yards
- BAL – Justin Forsett – 23 rushes, 95 yards

Top receivers

- ATL – Roddy White – 9 receptions, 100 yards, TD
- BAL – Torrey Smith – 3 receptions, 81 yards, TD

==== Week 8: at Cincinnati Bengals ====
Week Eight: Baltimore Ravens at Cincinnati Bengals – Game summary

Quarter	1	2	3	4	Total
Ravens	0	6	8	10	24
Bengals	7	0	10	10	27

at Paul Brown Stadium, Cincinnati, Ohio

- Date: October 26
- Game time: 1:00 pm. EDT
- Game weather: 62 °F (17 °C), sunny
- Game attendance: 55,711
- Referee: Clete Blakeman
- TV announcers (CBS): Greg Gumbel, Trent Green and Evan Washburn
- Recap, Gamebook

Game information

First quarter

- CIN – Andy Dalton 1-yard run (Mike Nugent kick), 10:01. Bengals 7–0. Drive: 9 plays, 80 yards, 4:59.

Second quarter

- BAL – Justin Tucker 45-yard field goal, 9:15. Bengals 7–3. Drive: 10 plays, 24 yards, 5:30.
- BAL – Justin Tucker 50-yard field goal, 1:02. Bengals 7–6. Drive: 8 plays, 35 yards, 3:32.

Third quarter

- CIN – Giovani Bernard 1-yard run (Mike Nugent kick), 9:56. Bengals 14–6. Drive: 8 plays, 51 yards, 3:48.
- CIN – Mike Nugent 32-yard field goal, 6:29. Bengals 17–6. Drive: 4 plays, 4 yards, 1:59.
- BAL – Lorenzo Taliaferro 10-yard run (Justin Forsett run), 1:58. Bengals 17–14. Drive: 9 plays, 79 yards, 4:31.

Fourth quarter

- CIN – Mike Nugent 33-yard field goal, 11:24. Bengals 20–14. Drive: 12 plays, 65 yards, 5:34.
- BAL – Lorenzo Taliaferro 8-yard run (Justin Tucker kick), 6:31. Ravens 21–20. Drive: 1 play, 8 yards, 0:05.
- BAL – Justin Tucker 53-yard field goal, 3:59. Ravens 24–20. Drive: 4 plays, 8 yards, 2:13.
- CIN – Andy Dalton 1-yard run (Mike Nugent kick), 0:57. Bengals 27–24. Drive: 10 plays, 80 yards, 3:02.

Top passers

- BAL – Joe Flacco – 17/34, 195 yards, 2 INT
- CIN – Andy Dalton – 21/28, 266 yards, INT

Top rushers

- BAL – Justin Forsett – 17 rushes, 68 yards
- CIN – Giovani Bernard – 16 rushes, 45 yards

Top receivers

- BAL – Lorenzo Taliaferro – 2 receptions, 42 yards
- CIN – Mohamed Sanu – 5 receptions, 125 yards

==== Week 9: at Pittsburgh Steelers ====
Week Nine: Baltimore Ravens at Pittsburgh Steelers – Game summary

Quarter	1	2	3	4	Total
Ravens	7	3	0	13	23
Steelers	0	22	0	21	43

at Heinz Field, Pittsburgh, Pennsylvania

- Date: November 2
- Game time: 8:30 pm. EST
- Game weather: 38 °F (3 °C), clear
- Game attendance: 63,971
- Referee: Bill Vinovich
- TV announcers (NBC): Al Michaels, Cris Collinsworth and Michele Tafoya
- Recap, Gamebook

Game information

First quarter

- BAL – Torrey Smith 35-yard pass from Joe Flacco (Justin Tucker kick), 9:41. Ravens 7–0. Drive: 1 play, 35 yards, 0:06.

Second quarter

- PIT – Le'Veon Bell 5-yard pass from Ben Roethlisberger (Shaun Suisham kick), 7:18. Tied 7–7. Drive: 5 plays, 27 yards, 1:56.
- PIT – Martavis Bryant 19-yard pass from Ben Roethlisberger (Shaun Suisham kick), 5:24. Steelers 14–7. Drive: 3 plays, 30 yards, 1:31.
- BAL – Justin Tucker 46-yard field goal, 1:44. Steelers 14–10. Drive: 10 plays, 49 yards, 3:40.
- PIT – Markus Wheaton 47-yard pass from Ben Roethlisberger (Brad Wing-Matt Spaeth pass), 0:53. Steelers 22–10. Drive: 5 plays, 80 yards, 0:51.

Third quarter

- No scoring plays.

Fourth quarter

- PIT – Antonio Brown 54-yard pass from Ben Roethlisberger (Shaun Suisham kick), 14:01. Steelers 29–10. Drive: 7 plays, 85 yards, 3:38.
- BAL – Jacoby Jones 108-yard kickoff return (Justin Tucker kick), 13:47. Steelers 29–17.
- PIT – Martavis Bryant 18-yard pass from Ben Roethlisberger (Shaun Suisham kick), 9:31. Steelers 36–17. Drive: 9 plays, 71 yards, 4:16.
- BAL – Crockett Gillmore 1-yard pass from Joe Flacco (run failed), 2:58. Steelers 36–23. Drive: 9 plays, 33 yards, 2:35.
- PIT – Matt Spaeth 33-yard pass from Ben Roethlisberger (Shaun Suisham kick), 1:51. Steelers 43–23. Drive: 4 plays, 41 yards, 1:07.

Top passers

- BAL – Joe Flacco – 30/45, 303 yards, 2 TD, INT
- PIT – Ben Roethlisberger – 25/37, 340 yards, 6 TD

Top rushers

- BAL – Justin Forsett – 9 rushes, 38 yards
- PIT – LeGarrette Blount – 10 rushes, 23 yards

Top receivers

- BAL – Justin Forsett – 5 receptions, 67 yards
- PIT – Antonio Brown – 11 receptions, 144 yards, TD

==== Week 10: vs. Tennessee Titans ====
Week Ten: Tennessee Titans at Baltimore Ravens – Game summary

Quarter	1	2	3	4	Total
Titans	7	0	0	0	7
Ravens	0	7	7	7	21

at M&T Bank Stadium, Baltimore, Maryland

- Date: November 9
- Game time: 1:00 pm. EST
- Game weather: 57 °F (14 °C), partly cloudy
- Game attendance: 70,914
- Referee: Walt Coleman
- TV announcers (CBS): Andrew Catalon, Steve Beuerlein and Steve Tasker
- Recap, Gamebook

Game information

First quarter

- TEN – Leon Washington 3-yard pass from Zach Mettenberger (Ryan Succop kick), 0:20. Titans 7–0. Drive: 9 plays, 58 yards, 4:38.

Second quarter

- BAL – Justin Forsett 9-yard run (Justin Tucker kick), 6:43. Tied 7–7. Drive: 8 plays, 46 yards, 3:56.

Third quarter

- BAL – Justin Forsett 11-yard run (Justin Tucker kick), 5:36. Ravens 14–7. Drive: 11 plays, 72 yards, 5:52.

Fourth quarter

- BAL – Torrey Smith 32-yard pass from Joe Flacco (Justin Tucker kick), 13:09. Ravens 21–7. Drive: 6 plays, 53 yards, 2:15.

Top passers

- TEN – Zach Mettenberger – 16/27, 179 yards, TD, INT
- BAL – Joe Flacco – 16/27, 169 yards, TD

Top rushers

- TEN – Bishop Sankey – 16 rushes, 55 yards
- BAL – Justin Forsett – 20 rushes, 112 yards, 2 TD

Top receivers

- TEN – Kendall Wright – 4 receptions, 53 yards
- BAL – Torrey Smith – 5 receptions, 75 yards, TD

==== Week 12: at New Orleans Saints ====
Week Twelve: Baltimore Ravens at New Orleans Saints – Game summary

Quarter	1	2	3	4	Total
Ravens	7	7	10	10	34
Saints	7	10	0	10	27

at Mercedes-Benz Superdome, New Orleans, Louisiana

- Date: November 24
- Game time: 8:30 pm. EST/7:30 p.m. CST
- Game weather: Played indoors (dome stadium)
- Game attendance: 73,373
- Referee: Bill Leavy
- TV announcers (ESPN): Mike Tirico, Jon Gruden and Lisa Salters
- Recap, Gamebook

Game information

First quarter

- BAL – Steve Smith Sr. 15-yard pass from Joe Flacco (Justin Tucker kick), 8:13. Ravens 7–0. Drive: 9 plays, 97 yards, 4:11.
- NO – Jimmy Graham 10-yard pass from Drew Brees (Shayne Graham kick), 3:20. Tied 7–7. Drive: 5 plays, 85 yards, 2:44.

Second quarter

- BAL – Justin Forsett 13-yard run (Justin Tucker kick), 9:08. Ravens 14–7. Drive: 4 plays, 69 yards, 2:05.
- NO – Shayne Graham 40-yard field goal, 4:00. Ravens 14–10. Drive: 11 plays, 78 yards, 5:08.
- NO – Marques Colston 26-yard pass from Drew Brees (Shayne Graham kick), 0:17. Saints 17–14. Drive: 8 plays, 81 yards, 1:34.

Third quarter

- BAL – Justin Tucker 31-yard field goal, 8:30. Tied 17–17. Drive: 13 plays, 67 yards, 6:30.
- BAL – Will Hill 44-yard interception return (Justin Tucker kick), 4:59. Ravens 24–17.

Fourth quarter

- BAL – Justin Tucker 55-yard field goal, 10:59. Ravens 27–17. Drive: 12 plays, 47 yards, 6:26.
- NO – Shayne Graham 34-yard field goal, 6:33. Ravens 27–20. Drive: 10 plays, 64 yards, 4:26.
- BAL – Justin Forsett 20-yard run (Justin Tucker kick), 2:53. Ravens 34–20. Drive: 6 plays, 80 yards, 3:40.
- NO – Jimmy Graham 2-yard pass from Drew Brees (Shayne Graham kick), 0:40. Ravens 34–27. Drive: 11 plays, 80 yards, 2:13.

Top passers

- BAL – Joe Flacco – 18/24, 243 yards, TD
- NO – Drew Brees – 35/45, 420 yards, 3 TD, INT

Top rushers

- BAL – Justin Forsett – 22 rushes, 182 yards, 2 TD
- NO – Joe Morgan – 1 rush, 67 yards

Top receivers

- BAL – Torrey Smith – 5 receptions, 98 yards
- NO – Kenny Stills – 8 receptions, 98 yards

The Ravens were the only AFC North team to defeat all of their NFC South opponents.

==== Week 13: vs. San Diego Chargers ====
Week Thirteen: San Diego Chargers at Baltimore Ravens – Game summary

Quarter	1	2	3	4	Total
Chargers	7	3	3	21	34
Ravens	10	6	7	10	33

at M&T Bank Stadium, Baltimore, Maryland

- Date: November 30
- Game time: 1:00 pm. EST
- Game weather: 54 °F (12 °C), partly cloudy
- Game attendance: 71,060
- Referee: Walt Anderson
- TV announcers (CBS): Ian Eagle, Dan Fouts and Jenny Dell
- Recap, Gamebook

Game information

First quarter

- BAL – Torrey Smith 16-yard pass from Joe Flacco (Justin Tucker kick), 10:46. Ravens 7–0. Drive: 8 plays 61 yards, 4:14.
- BAL – Justin Tucker 33-yard field goal, 7:48. Ravens 10–0. Drive: 4 plays, 4 yards, 2:11.
- SD – Keenan Allen 12-yard pass from Philip Rivers (Nick Novak kick), 0:20. Ravens 10–7. Drive: 13 plays, 80 yards, 7:28.

Second quarter

- BAL – Justin Tucker 21-yard field goal, 11:09. Ravens 13–7. Drive: 11 plays, 66 yards, 4:11.
- BAL – Justin Tucker 29-yard field goal, 1:41. Ravens 16–7. Drive: 9 plays, 73 yards, 4:01.
- SD – Nick Novak 52-yard field goal, 0:02. Ravens 16–10. Drive: 10 plays, 46 yards, 1:39.

Third quarter

- SD – Nick Novak 26-yard field goal, 10:10. Ravens 16–13. Drive: 9 plays, 72 yards, 4:50.
- BAL – Torrey Smith 10-yard pass from Joe Flacco (Justin Tucker kick), 5:01. Ravens 23–13. Drive: 10 plays, 53 yards, 5:09.

Fourth quarter

- SD – Ryan Mathews 14-yard run (Nick Novak kick), 13:12. Ravens 23–20. Drive: 5 plays, 59 yards, 2:05.
- BAL – Joe Flacco 1-yard run (Justin Tucker kick), 6:13. Ravens 30–20. Drive: 12 plays, 79 yards, 6:59.
- SD – Keenan Allen 23-yard pass from Philip Rivers (Nick Novak kick), 3:40. Ravens 30–27. Drive: 6 plays, 77 yards, 2:33.
- BAL – Justin Tucker 31-yard field goal, 2:22. Ravens 33–27. Drive: 6 plays, 17 yards, 1:18.
- SD – Eddie Royal 1-yard pass from Philip Rivers (Nick Novak kick), 0:38. Chargers 34–33. Drive: 8 plays, 80 yards, 1:44.

Top passers

- SD – Philip Rivers – 34/45, 383 yards, 3 TD, INT
- BAL – Joe Flacco – 19/31, 225 yards, 2 TD

Top rushers

- SD – Ryan Mathews – 12 rushes, 40 yards, TD
- BAL – Justin Forsett – 24 rushes, 106 yards

Top receivers

- SD – Keenan Allen – 11 receptions, 121 yards, 2 TD
- BAL – Torrey Smith – 6 receptions, 65 yards, 2 TD

==== Week 14: at Miami Dolphins ====
Week Fourteen: Baltimore Ravens at Miami Dolphins – Game summary

Quarter	1	2	3	4	Total
Ravens	0	7	7	14	28
Dolphins	10	0	0	3	13

at Sun Life Stadium, Miami Gardens, Florida

- Date: December 7
- Game time: 1:00 pm. EST
- Game weather: 76 °F (24 °C), sunny
- Game attendance: 70,244
- Referee: John Parry
- TV announcers (CBS): Andrew Catalon, Steve Beuerlein and Steve Tasker
- Recap, Gamebook

Game information

First quarter

- MIA – Caleb Sturgis 44-yard field goal, 9:28. Dolphins 3–0. Drive: 7 plays, 36 yards, 4:02.
- MIA – Brian Hartline 3-yard pass from Ryan Tannehill (Caleb Sturgis kick), 1:41. Dolphins 10–0. Drive: 11 plays, 66 yards, 5:27.

Second quarter

- BAL – Steve Smith Sr. 1-yard pass from Joe Flacco (Justin Tucker kick), 0:02. Dolphins 10–7. Drive: 12 plays, 97 yards, 3:06.

Third quarter

- BAL – Kamar Aiken 13-yard pass from Joe Flacco (Justin Tucker kick), 6:14. Ravens 14–10. Drive: 11 plays, 75 yards, 5:18.

Fourth quarter

- MIA – Caleb Sturgis 34-yard field goal, 12:41. Ravens 14–13. Drive: 8 plays, 27 yards, 3:43.
- BAL – Justin Forsett 2-yard run (Justin Tucker kick), 8:09. Ravens 21–13. Drive: 9 plays, 80 yards, 4:32.
- BAL – Joe Flacco 1-yard run (Justin Tucker kick), 3:34. Ravens 28–13. Drive: 7 plays, 81 yards, 2:54.

Top passers

- BAL – Joe Flacco – 25/33, 269 yards, 2 TD, INT
- MIA – Ryan Tannehill – 23/33, 227 yards, TD

Top rushers

- BAL – Justin Forsett – 13 rushes, 71 yards, TD
- MIA – Lamar Miller – 12 rushes, 53 yards

Top receivers

- BAL – Steve Smith Sr. – 7 receptions, 70 yards, TD
- MIA – Jarvis Landry – 6 receptions, 55 yards

==== Week 15: vs. Jacksonville Jaguars ====
Week Fifteen: Jacksonville Jaguars at Baltimore Ravens – Game summary

Quarter	1	2	3	4	Total
Jaguars	6	6	0	0	12
Ravens	7	3	7	3	20

at M&T Bank Stadium, Baltimore, Maryland

- Date: December 14
- Game time: 1:00 pm. EST
- Game weather: 47 °F (8 °C), mostly cloudy, chilly
- Game attendance: 70,801
- Referee: Tony Corrente
- TV announcers (CBS): Tom McCarthy, Adam Archuleta and Allie LaForce
- Recap, Gamebook

Game information

First quarter

- BAL – Kamar Aiken 11-yard return of blocked punt (Justin Tucker kick), 11:52. Ravens 7–0.
- JAX – Josh Scobee 53-yard field goal, 9:33. Ravens 7–3. Drive: 7 plays, 31 yards, 2:19.
- JAX – Josh Scobee 45-yard field goal, 1:18. Ravens 7–6. Drive: 12 plays, 62 yards, 6:42.

Second quarter

- JAX – Josh Scobee 53-yard field goal, 11:33. Jaguars 9–7. Drive: 4 plays, -2 yards, 2:01.
- BAL – Justin Tucker 22-yard field goal, 3:45. Ravens 10–9. Drive: 10 plays, 65 yards, 5:20.
- JAX – Josh Scobee 45-yard field goal, 0:04. Jaguars 12–10. Drive: 4 plays, 29 yards, 0:36.

Third quarter

- BAL – Owen Daniels 3-yard pass from Joe Flacco (Justin Tucker kick), 8:34. Ravens 17–12. Drive: 6 plays, 80 yards, 3:19.

Fourth quarter

- BAL – Justin Tucker 33-yard field goal, 1:11. Ravens 20–12. Drive: 8 plays, 49 yards, 2:10.

Top passers

- JAX – Blake Bortles – 21/37, 210 yards, INT
- BAL – Joe Flacco – 20/30, 221 yards, TD

Top rushers

- JAX – Toby Gerhart – 13 rushes, 54 yards
- BAL – Justin Forsett – 16 rushes, 48 yards

Top receivers

- JAX – Cecil Shorts – 6 receptions, 76 yards
- BAL – Marlon Brown – 5 receptions, 66 yards

==== Week 16: at Houston Texans ====
Week Sixteen: Baltimore Ravens at Houston Texans – Game summary

Quarter	1	2	3	4	Total
Ravens	0	0	7	6	13
Texans	3	13	3	6	25

at NRG Stadium, Houston, Texas

- Date: December 21
- Game time: 1:00 pm. EST/12:00 pm. CST
- Game weather: Played indoors (retractable roof closed)
- Game attendance: 71,771
- Referee: Walt Coleman
- TV announcers (CBS): Andrew Catalon, Steve Beuerlein, Steve Tasker and Lewis Johnson
- Recap, Gamebook

Game information

First quarter

- HOU – Randy Bullock 35-yard field goal, 10:33. Texans 3–0. Drive: 10 plays, 63 yards, 4:27.

Second quarter

- HOU – Randy Bullock 25-yard field goal, 14:57. Texans 6–0. Drive: 11 plays, 69 yards, 5:27.
- HOU – Randy Bullock 30-yard field goal, 3:54. Texans 9–0. Drive: 4 plays, 4 yards, 0:57.
- HOU – C.J. Fiedorowicz 5-yard pass from Arian Foster (Randy Bullock kick), 1:53. Texans 16–0. Drive: 4 plays, 19 yards, 1:47.

Third quarter

- BAL – Torrey Smith 8-yard pass from Joe Flacco (Justin Tucker kick), 11:10. Texans 16–7. Drive: 4 plays, 9 yards, 1:04.
- HOU – Randy Bullock 20-yard field goal, 8:01. Texans 19–7. Drive: 7 plays, 17 yards, 2:33.

Fourth quarter

- HOU – Randy Bullock 39-yard field goal, 14:50. Texans 22–7. Drive: 13 plays, 49 yards, 5:07.
- HOU – Randy Bullock 33-yard field goal, 9:55. Texans 25–7. Drive: 6 plays, 39 yards, 2:31.
- BAL – Torrey Smith 20-yard pass from Joe Flacco (pass failed), 5:56. Texans 25–13. Drive: 9 plays, 76 yards, 3:59.

Top passers

- BAL – Joe Flacco – 21/50, 195 yards, 2 TD, 3 INT
- HOU – Case Keenum – 20/42, 185 yards, INT

Top rushers

- BAL – Justin Forsett – 10 rushes, 19 yards
- HOU – Arian Foster – 25 rushes, 96 yards

Top receivers

- BAL – Torrey Smith – 5 receptions, 59 yards, 2 TD
- HOU – Andre Johnson – 6 receptions, 65 yards

==== Week 17: vs. Cleveland Browns ====
Week Seventeen: Cleveland Browns at Baltimore Ravens – Game summary

Quarter	1	2	3	4	Total
Browns	0	3	7	0	10
Ravens	0	3	0	17	20

at M&T Bank Stadium, Baltimore, Maryland

- Date: December 28
- Game time: 1:00 pm. EST
- Game weather: 54 °F (12 °C), cloudy
- Game attendance: 71,070
- Referee: Gene Steratore
- TV announcers (CBS): Kevin Harlan, Rich Gannon and Jamie Erdahl
- Recap, Gamebook

Game information

First quarter

- No scoring plays.

Second quarter

- BAL – Justin Tucker 25-yard field goal, 8:05. Ravens 3–0. Drive: 9 plays, 51 yards, 3:32.
- CLE – Garrett Hartley 38-yard field goal, 2:32. Tied 3–3. Drive: 10 plays, 55 yards, 5:33.

Third quarter

- CLE – Terrance West 2-yard run (Garrett Hartley kick), 3:29. Browns 10–3. Drive: 7 plays, 80 yards, 3:53.

Fourth quarter

- BAL – Justin Tucker 28-yard field goal, 10:37. Browns 10–6. Drive: 8 plays, 73 yards, 4:04.
- BAL – Torrey Smith 17-yard pass from Joe Flacco (Justin Tucker kick), 7:33. Ravens 13–10. Drive: 2 plays, 69 yards, 0:50.
- BAL – Kamar Aiken 2-yard pass from Joe Flacco (Justin Tucker kick), 3:44. Ravens 20–10. Drive: 6 plays, 57 yards, 3:16.

Top passers

- CLE – Connor Shaw – 14/28, 177 yards, INT
- BAL – Joe Flacco – 22/36, 212 yards, 2 TD

Top rushers

- CLE – Terrance West – 18 rushes, 94 yards, TD
- BAL – Justin Forsett – 17 rushes, 119 yards

Top receivers

- CLE – Taylor Gabriel – 3 receptions, 66 yards
- BAL – Steve Smith Sr. – 8 receptions, 90 yards

With the win, the Ravens finished the season 10–6. The team also improved to 13–1 against the Browns in the Flacco-Harbaugh era. Thanks to the Kansas City Chiefs defeating the San Diego Chargers, the Ravens secured the sixth seed in the NFL playoffs.

== Postseason ==
Round	Date	Opponent (seed)	Result	Record	Venue	Recap
Wild Card	January 3, 2015	at Pittsburgh Steelers (3)	W 30–17	1–0	Heinz Field	Recap
Divisional	January 10, 2015	at New England Patriots (1)	L 31–35	1–1	Gillette Stadium	Recap

=== AFC Wild Card Playoffs: at #3 Pittsburgh Steelers ===
AFC Wild Card Playoffs: (#6) Baltimore Ravens at (#3) Pittsburgh Steelers – Game summary

Quarter	1	2	3	4	Total
Ravens	0	10	10	10	30
Steelers	3	6	0	8	17

at Heinz Field, Pittsburgh, Pennsylvania

- Date: January 3, 2015
- Game time: 8:15 p.m. EST
- Game weather: 48 °F (9 °C), cloudy
- Game attendance: 62,780
- Referee: Clete Blakeman
- TV announcers (NBC): Al Michaels, Cris Collinsworth and Michele Tafoya
- Recap, Gamebook

Game information

1st quarter

- PIT – Shaun Suisham 45-yard field goal, 1:29. Steelers 3–0. Drive: 9 plays, 33 yards, 5:36.

2nd quarter

- BAL – Bernard Pierce 5-yard run (Justin Tucker kick), 12:28. Ravens 7–3. Drive: 8 plays, 80 yards, 4:01.
- PIT – Shaun Suisham 22-yard field goal, 5:40. Ravens 7–6. Drive: 12 plays, 82 yards, 6:48.
- BAL – Justin Tucker 28-yard field goal, 2:41. Ravens 10–6. Drive: 10 plays, 70 yards, 2:59.
- PIT – Shaun Suisham 47-yard field goal, 0:37. Ravens 10–9. Drive: 9 plays, 53 yards, 2:04.

3rd quarter

- BAL – Justin Tucker 45-yard field goal, 10:06. Ravens 13–9. Drive: 9 plays, 57 yards, 4:54.
- BAL – Torrey Smith 11-yard pass from Joe Flacco (Justin Tucker kick), 4:13. Ravens 20–9. Drive: 6 plays, 69 yards, 3:25.

4th quarter

- PIT – Martavis Bryant 6-yard pass from Ben Roethlisberger (pass failed), 11:01. Ravens 20–15. Drive: 2 plays, 45 yards, 0:50.
- BAL – Justin Tucker 52-yard field goal, 8:47. Ravens 23–15. Drive: 7 plays, 29 yards, 2:14.
- BAL – Crockett Gillmore 21-yard pass from Joe Flacco (Justin Tucker kick), 7:56. Ravens 30–15. Drive: 1 play, 21 yards, 0:07.
- PIT – Punt blocked by Shamarko Thomas out of bounds in endzone for a safety, 1:56. Ravens 30–17.

Leading passers

- BAL – Joe Flacco – 18/29, 259 yards, 2 TD
- PIT – Ben Roethlisberger – 31/45, 334 yards, TD, 2 INT

Leading rushers

- BAL – Justin Forsett – 16 rushes, 36 yards
- PIT – Josh Harris – 9 rushes, 25 yards

Leading receivers

- BAL – Steve Smith Sr. – 5 rec, 101 yards
- PIT – Antonio Brown – 9 rec, 117 yards

=== AFC Divisional Playoffs: at #1 New England Patriots ===
AFC Divisional Playoffs: #6 Baltimore Ravens at #1 New England Patriots – Game summary

Quarter	1	2	3	4	Total
Ravens	14	7	7	3	31
Patriots	7	7	14	7	35

at Gillette Stadium, Foxborough, Massachusetts

- Date: January 10, 2015
- Game time: 4:35 pm. EST
- Game weather: 20 °F (−7 °C), clear, windy and cold
- Game attendance: 68,756
- Referee: Bill Vinovich
- TV announcers (NBC): Al Michaels, Cris Collinsworth and Michele Tafoya
- Recap, Gamebook

Game information

First quarter

- BAL – Kamar Aiken 19-yard pass from Joe Flacco (Justin Tucker kick), 12:18. Ravens 7–0. Drive: 5 plays, 71 yards, 2:42.
- BAL – Steve Smith, Sr. 9-yard pass from Joe Flacco (Justin Tucker kick), 4:44. Ravens 14–0. Drive: 11 plays, 79 yards, 6:00.
- NE – Tom Brady 4-yard run (Stephen Gostkowski kick), 0:48. Ravens 14–7. Drive: 8 plays, 78 yards, 3:56.

Second quarter

- NE – Danny Amendola 15-yard pass from Tom Brady (Stephen Gostkowski kick), 3:37. Tied 14–14. Drive: 10 plays, 67 yards, 3:36.
- BAL – Owen Daniels 11-yard pass from Joe Flacco (Justin Tucker kick), 0:10. Ravens 21–14. Drive: 6 plays, 57 yards, 0:53.

Third quarter

- BAL – Justin Forsett 16-yard pass from Joe Flacco (Justin Tucker kick), 10:22. Ravens 28–14. Drive: 9 plays, 70 yards, 3:40.
- NE – Rob Gronkowski 5-yard pass from Tom Brady (Stephen Gostkowski kick), 6:48. Ravens 28–21. Drive: 9 plays, 80 yards, 3:34.
- NE – Danny Amendola 51-yard pass from Julian Edelman (Stephen Gostkowski kick), 4:20. Tied 28–28. Drive: 3 plays, 70 yards, 1:13.

Fourth quarter

- BAL – Justin Tucker 25-yard field goal, 10:17. Ravens 31–28. Drive: 16 plays, 73 yards, 7:52.
- NE – Brandon LaFell 23-yard pass from Tom Brady (Stephen Gostkowski kick), 5:13. Patriots 35–31. Drive: 10 plays, 74 yards, 5:04.

Top passers

- BAL – Joe Flacco – 28/45, 292 yards, 4 TD, 2 INT
- NE – Tom Brady – 33/50, 367 yards, 3 TD, INT

Top rushers

- BAL – Justin Forsett – 24 rushes, 129 yards
- NE – Brandon Bolden – 3 rushes, 7 yards

Top receivers

- BAL – Torrey Smith – 3 receptions, 62 yards
- NE – Rob Gronkowski – 7 receptions, 108 yards, TD

== Standings ==
=== Division ===
AFC North
	W	L	T	PCT	DIV	CONF	PF	PA	STK
^{(3)} Pittsburgh Steelers	11	5	0	.688	4–2	9–3	436	368	W4
^{(5)} Cincinnati Bengals	10	5	1	.656	3–3	7–5	365	344	L1
^{(6)} Baltimore Ravens	10	6	0	.625	3–3	6–6	409	302	W1
Cleveland Browns	7	9	0	.438	2–4	4–8	299	337	L5

=== Conference ===
AFC
#	Team	Division	W	L	T	PCT	DIV	CONF	SOS	SOV	STK
Division leaders
1 (Note: New England defeated Denver head-to-head (Week 9, 43–21).)	New England Patriots	East	12	4	0	.750	4–2	9–3	.514	.487	L1
2	Denver Broncos	West	12	4	0	.750	6–0	10–2	.521	.484	W1
3 (Note: Pittsburgh defeated Indianapolis head-to-head (Week 8, 51–34).)	Pittsburgh Steelers	North	11	5	0	.688	4–2	9–3	.451	.486	W4
4	Indianapolis Colts	South	11	5	0	.688	6–0	9–3	.479	.372	W1
Wild Cards
5	Cincinnati Bengals	North	10	5	1	.656	3–3	7–5	.498	.425	L1
6	Baltimore Ravens	North	10	6	0	.625	3–3	6–6	.475	.378	W1
Did not qualify for the postseason
7 (Note: Kansas City finished ahead of San Diego in the AFC West based on head-to-head sweep (Week 7, 23–20; Week 17, 19–7). Houston finished ahead of Kansas City and Buffalo based on conference record. Kansas City finished ahead of Buffalo based on head-to-head victory (Week 10, 17–13). San Diego finished ahead of Buffalo based on head-to-head victory (Week 3, 22–10).)	Houston Texans	South	9	7	0	.563	4–2	8–4	.447	.299	W2
8	Kansas City Chiefs	West	9	7	0	.563	3–3	7–5	.512	.500	W1
9	San Diego Chargers	West	9	7	0	.563	2–4	6–6	.512	.403	L1
10	Buffalo Bills	East	9	7	0	.563	4–2	5–7	.516	.486	W1
11	Miami Dolphins	East	8	8	0	.500	3–3	6–6	.512	.406	L1
12	Cleveland Browns	North	7	9	0	.438	2–4	4–8	.479	.371	L5
13	New York Jets	East	4	12	0	.250	1–5	4–8	.543	.375	W1
14 (Note: Jacksonville finished ahead of Oakland based on record vs. common opponents (1–4 to 0–5).)	Jacksonville Jaguars	South	3	13	0	.188	1–5	2–10	.514	.313	L1
15	Oakland Raiders	West	3	13	0	.188	1–5	2–10	.570	.542	L1
16	Tennessee Titans	South	2	14	0	.125	1–5	2–10	.506	.375	L10
Tiebreakers (Note: When breaking ties for three or more teams under the NFL's rules, they are first broken within divisions, then comparing only the highest ranked remaining team from each division.)
