= Giovani Bernard =

American football player (born 1991)

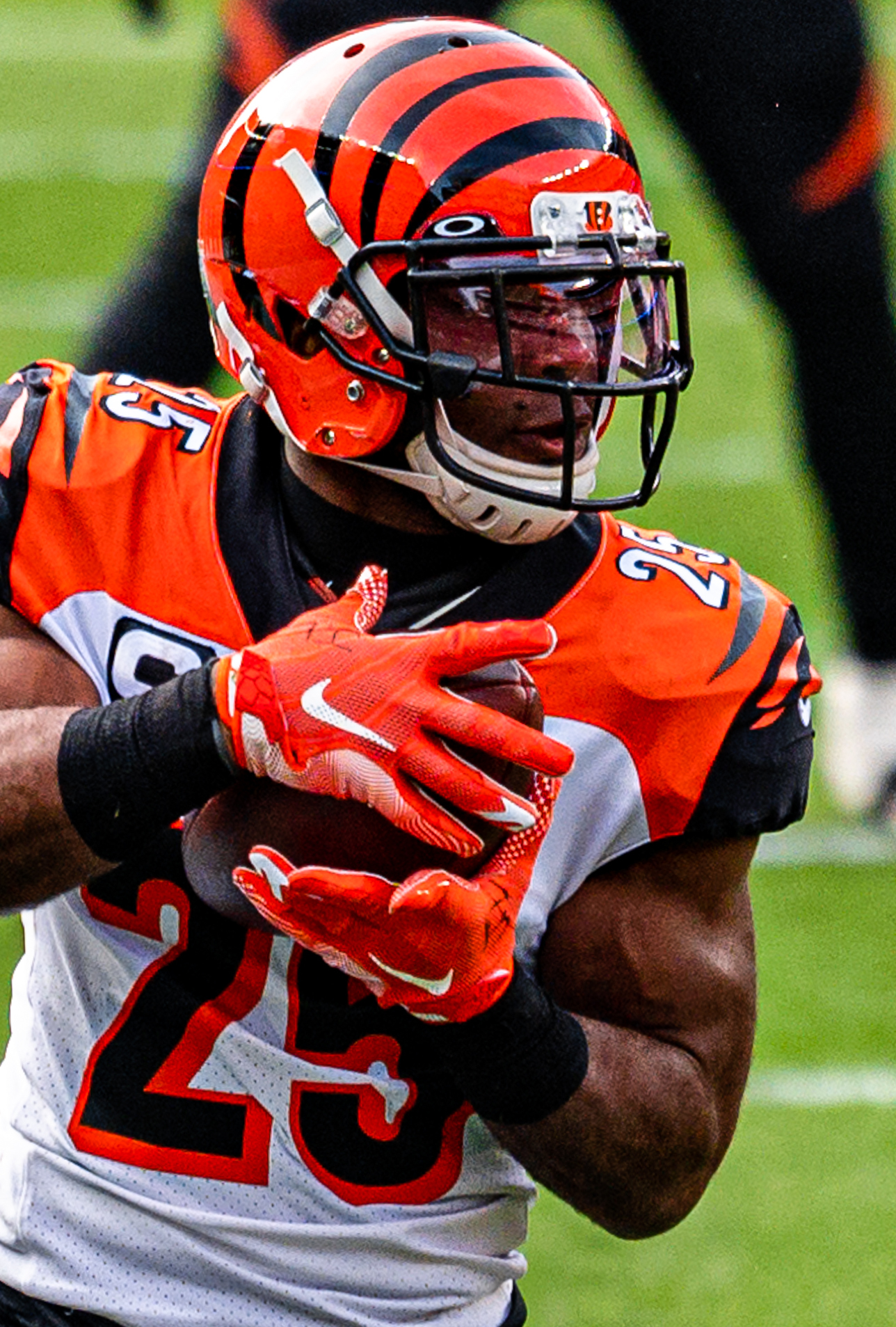
- Bernard with the Cincinnati Bengals in 2019

No. 25
- Position: Running back

Personal information
- Born: November 22, 1991 (age 34); West Palm Beach, Florida, U.S.
- Listed height: 5 ft 9 in (1.75 m)
- Listed weight: 205 lb (93 kg)

Career information
- High school: St. Thomas Aquinas (Fort Lauderdale, Florida)
- College: North Carolina (2010–2012)
- NFL draft: 2013: 2nd round, 37th overall pick

Career history
- Cincinnati Bengals (2013–2020); Tampa Bay Buccaneers (2021–2022)

Awards and highlights
- PFWA All-Rookie Team (2013); Third-team All-American (2012); ACC Offensive Player of the Year (2012); ACC Brian Piccolo Award (2011); 2× First-team All-ACC (2011, 2012); CFPA Punt Returner Trophy (2012)

Career NFL statistics
- Rushing yards: 3,783
- Rushing average: 4
- Rushing touchdowns: 22
- Receptions: 367
- Receiving yards: 2,989
- Receiving touchdowns: 14
- Stats at Pro Football Reference

Giovani Govan Bernard (born November 22, 1991) is an American former professional football player who was a running back for 10 seasons in the National Football League (NFL). He played college football for the North Carolina Tar Heels and was selected by the Cincinnati Bengals in the second round of the 2013 NFL draft, spending eight seasons with the team. After being released by the Bengals after the 2020 season, Bernard then played two seasons with the Tampa Bay Buccaneers before retiring.

== Early life ==
Bernard was born in West Palm Beach, Florida, the son of Haitian immigrant parents, who own a dry-cleaning business in Boca Raton, Florida. He began playing football for the local tackle football league, the Boca Jets. Bernard played football at St. Thomas Aquinas High School in Fort Lauderdale, Florida, where he was teammates with Florida State safety Lamarcus Joyner and New England Patriots running back James White. While in high school, Bernard was ranked the No. 2 running back in Florida by the Orlando Sentinel and the No. 12 running back in the United States by Rivals.com. He is the younger brother of former Oregon State running back Yvenson Bernard.

Bernard was recruited by many schools and first committed to Notre Dame, but ultimately decided to play for the University of North Carolina.

College recruiting
Name	Hometown	School	Height	Weight	40^{‡}	Commit date
Giovani Bernard; RB	Davie, FL	St. Thomas Aquinas	5 ft 9 in (1.75 m)	196.5 lb (89.1 kg)	4.5 s	Jan 28, 2010
Giovani Bernard; RB	Recruit ratings: Scout: Rivals: (79)					
Overall recruit ranking: Scout: 94, 13 (RB) Rivals: 186, 14 (RB) ESPN: 16 (RB)
Note: In many cases, Scout, Rivals, 247Sports, On3, and ESPN may conflict in their listings of height and weight.; In these cases, the average was taken. ESPN grades are on a 100-point scale.; Sources: "2010 North Carolina Football Commitment List". Rivals.; "North Carolina College Football Recruiting Commits". Scout.; "North Carolina Tar Heels: ACC Conference: 2010 Player Commits". ESPN.; "Scout.com Team Recruiting Rankings". Scout.; "2010 Team Ranking". Rivals.com.

== College career ==
Bernard enrolled in the University of North Carolina at Chapel Hill and played for the Tar Heels from 2010 to 2012. During the third day of practice, he tore his ACL after trying to cut away from a defender and redshirted for the 2010 season.

Bernard recovered from the injury and became the starting tailback for the Tar Heels in the 2011 college football season. He became the first North Carolina running back to rush for at least 100 yards in five straight games since Ethan Horton in 1984. Bernard's season-high came against Georgia Tech on September 24, 2011, when he rushed for 155 yards. In mid-October 2011, he was added to the watch list for the Maxwell Award, presented annually to the best player in college football. During the 2011 regular season, Bernard's 1,222 rushing yards ranked 20th among NCAA Division I FBS players. He also had 326 receiving yards and 14 touchdowns in 10 games. Bernard was the first running back to eclipse the 1,000-yards plateau at North Carolina since Jonathan Linton did it in 1997. He was also the top freshman running back in the nation in yards per game that season.

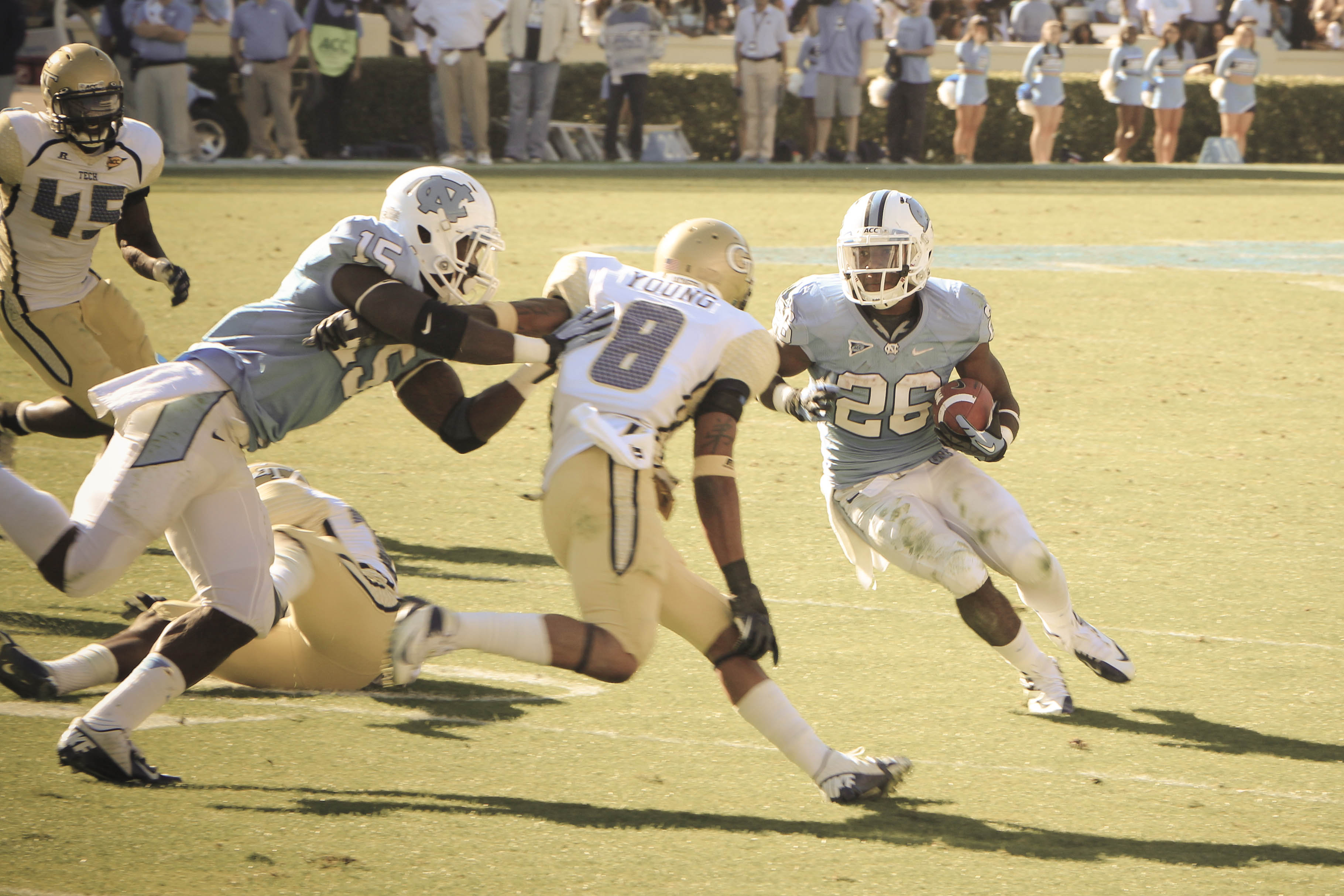
Bernard (#26) in 2012

In the first year of head coach Larry Fedora's spread offense in the 2012 season, Bernard increased his rushing yards per game, average yards per carry, and receiving yards. He also returned punts for the first time in his college career. On October 27, 2012, Bernard returned a punt 74 yards against NC State in the last 30 seconds of the game to break the tie and win the game. He led Carolina in scoring for the second year in a row and averaged 198.1 all-purpose yards per game, third in the country behind two receivers. The head coaches in the ACC voted Bernard to All-ACC first-team and Bernard was second in player-of-the-year and offensive player-of-the-year voting. He also won the CFPA Punt Returner Trophy for the 2012 season. Overall, Bernard finished the 2012 season with 1,228 rushing yards, 12 rushing touchdowns, 490 receiving yards, five receiving touchdowns, and two punt return touchdowns.

== Professional career ==
=== Pre-draft ===
On December 14, 2012, Bernard announced that he was entering the 2013 NFL draft. Bernard was projected by the majority of analysts and scouts to be selected anywhere from the first to third round. He was ranked the fourth best running back and 67th best prospect by NFLDraftScout.com. Bernard was invited to the NFL Combine and completed all the drills and the entire workout. He was satisfied with his performance and decided to only participate in positional drills at North Carolina's Pro Day.

Pre-draft measurables
Height	Weight	Arm length	Hand span	40-yard dash	10-yard split	20-yard split	20-yard shuttle	Three-cone drill	Vertical jump	Broad jump	Bench press	Wonderlic
5 ft 8 3/8 in (1.74 m)	202 lb (92 kg)	28 in (0.71 m)	9 3/8 in (0.24 m)	4.53 s	1.56 s	2.64 s	4.12 s	6.91 s	33.5 in (0.85 m)	10 ft 2 in (3.10 m)	19 reps	25
All values from NFL Combine

=== Cincinnati Bengals ===
==== 2013 season ====
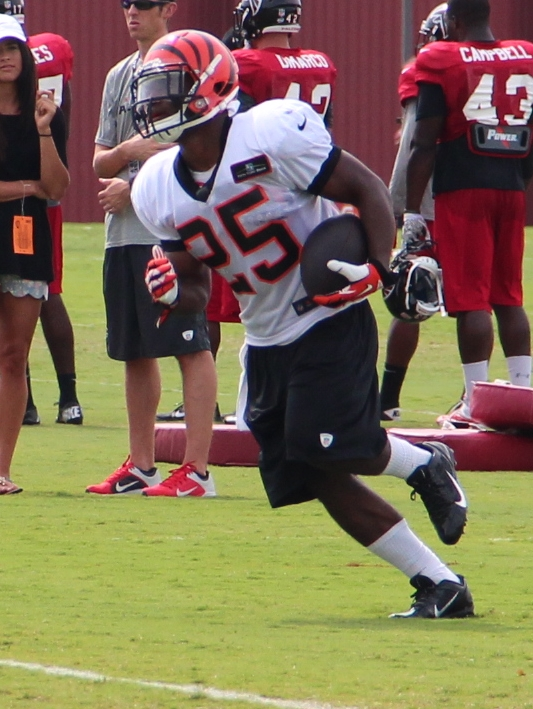
Bernard at training camp in 2013

Bernard was selected by the Cincinnati Bengals in the second round with the 37th overall pick. The Bengals previously traded quarterback Carson Palmer to the Oakland Raiders in exchange for the pick used to select Bernard, and a 2012 first round pick that was used to select Dre Kirkpatrick. Prior to Bernard, a running back from North Carolina had not been selected in the first two rounds of the NFL Draft since Natrone Means was selected in the second round with the 41st overall pick by the San Diego Chargers in 1993.

On May 23, 2013, the Bengals signed Bernard to a four-year, $5.25 million contract, with a $2.2 million signing bonus and $3.2 million guaranteed.

Bernard began his rookie season serving as a backup to veteran Benjarvus Green-Ellis and began transitioning to a change-of-pace back throughout the season. Bernard made his professional regular season debut in the season opener against the Chicago Bears and finished the 24–21 road loss with four carries for 22 yards and an eight-yard reception. In the next game, Bernard scored two touchdowns in a 20–10 Monday Night Football victory over the Bengals' division rival Pittsburgh Steelers.

On October 31, 2013, Bernard scored two touchdowns on nine carries in an overtime loss to the Miami Dolphins. His second score came on a 35-yard touchdown run that was praised by commentators as one of the best runs of the season. On December 8, Bernard had a season-high 99 rushing yards on 12 carries while also racking up 49 receiving yards on four catches in a 42–28 victory over the Indianapolis Colts.

In his first season with the Bengals, they finished with an 11–5 record and made the playoffs. Bernard played in his first playoff game on January 5, 2014, a 27–10 loss to the San Diego Chargers.

Bernard finished his rookie season second on the team in rushing (695 yards), receptions (56), and total yards (1,209), while ranking third in receiving yards (514) and touchdowns (five rushing and three receiving). He was named to the NFL All-Rookie Team.

==== 2014 season ====
After the Bengals drafted running back Jeremy Hill in the second round of the 2014 NFL draft and Green-Ellis was released at the end of the preseason, Bernard was named the Bengals' starting running back to start the season. In their season opener at the AFC North division rival Baltimore Ravens, on September 7, 2014, Bernard earned his first career start, carrying the ball 14 times for 48 yards, and made six receptions for 62 receiving yards.

On October 12, 2014, against the Carolina Panthers, he had his first career game with over 100 rushing yards. After starting the first seven games of the season, he missed Weeks 9–11 due to injury. He finished his second professional season with 168 carries for 680 yards and five touchdowns to go along with 43 receptions for 349 yards and two touchdowns in 13 games and nine starts.

==== 2015 season ====
Bernard entered training camp competing with Jeremy Hill to be the Cincinnati Bengals' starting running back. He was named the backup to Hill to begin the regular season.

On September 20, 2015, he had 20 carries for 123 rushing yards after taking over for Hill after he was benched for ineffective play during a 24–19 win over the San Diego Chargers. In Week 5, the Bengals pulled off the second biggest comeback in franchise history, rallying from 17 points down to defeat the two-time defending NFC-Champion Seattle Seahawks in overtime, 27–24. In the win, Bernard tallied 101 yards from scrimmage including 80 yards on the ground. On December 20, 2015, Bernard got his first start of the season against the San Francisco 49ers, rushing for 33 yards on 14 carries in the 24–14 road victory.

Bernard finished the regular season with 154 carries for 730 yards and two touchdowns to go along with 49 receptions for 472 yards in 16 games and one start. During the Bengals' 18–16 playoff loss to the Pittsburgh Steelers in the Wild Card Round, he was injured on a hit by linebacker Ryan Shazier. Bernard fumbled and lost the ball and did not return to the game and finished with six carries for 28 yards and two catches for two yards.

==== 2016 season ====
On June 8, 2016, Bernard signed a three-year, $15.5 million contract extension with the Bengals.

On September 18, 2016, Bernard caught a career-high nine passes for 100 yards and a touchdown against the Pittsburgh Steelers, his second 100-plus receiving yard game and his sixth receiving touchdown of his career. In a Week 5 matchup against the Dallas Cowboys, he earned his first start of the season and finished the 28–14 loss with nine carries for 50 yards and six receptions for 46 yards. On October 23, 2016, Bernard ran for a season-high 80 yards on 17 carries and a touchdown against the Cleveland Browns. The following week, Bernard scored his third touchdown of the season and had 11 carries for 52 rushing yards and a touchdown in a 27–27 tie with the Washington Redskins.

On November 20, 2016, Bernard suffered a torn ACL during a 16–12 loss to the Buffalo Bills and was placed on injured reserve, ending his season. He finished the 2016 season with 92 carries for 337 yards and two touchdowns to go along with 39 receptions for 336 yards and a touchdown in 10 games and two starts.

==== 2017 season ====
In the 2017 offseason, the Bengals drafted Joe Mixon, adding another player to a crowded backfield. Bernard did not contribute as much on the ground but did have some solid production in the receiving game. In Weeks 3 and 4, he had consecutive games with a receiving touchdown. On Christmas Eve, against the Detroit Lions, he had 116 rushing yards and a touchdown to go along with seven receptions for 52 yards. On December 4, Bernard was hit by Steelers linebacker Ryan Shazier; the hit left Shazier with a spinal contusion that ultimately led to his premature retirement from the NFL. Overall, in the 2017 season, Bernard had 105 carries for 458 yards and two touchdowns to go along with 43 receptions for 389 yards and two touchdowns.

==== 2018 season ====
Bernard started the 2018 season as the backup to Mixon. In Week 3 against the Carolina Panthers, he rushed for 61 yards and a touchdown. The following week, he recorded 25 carries for 69 yards and two touchdowns against the Atlanta Falcons. Overall, he finished the 2018 season with 56 carries for 211 yards and three touchdowns to go along with 35 receptions for 218 yards.

==== 2019 season ====
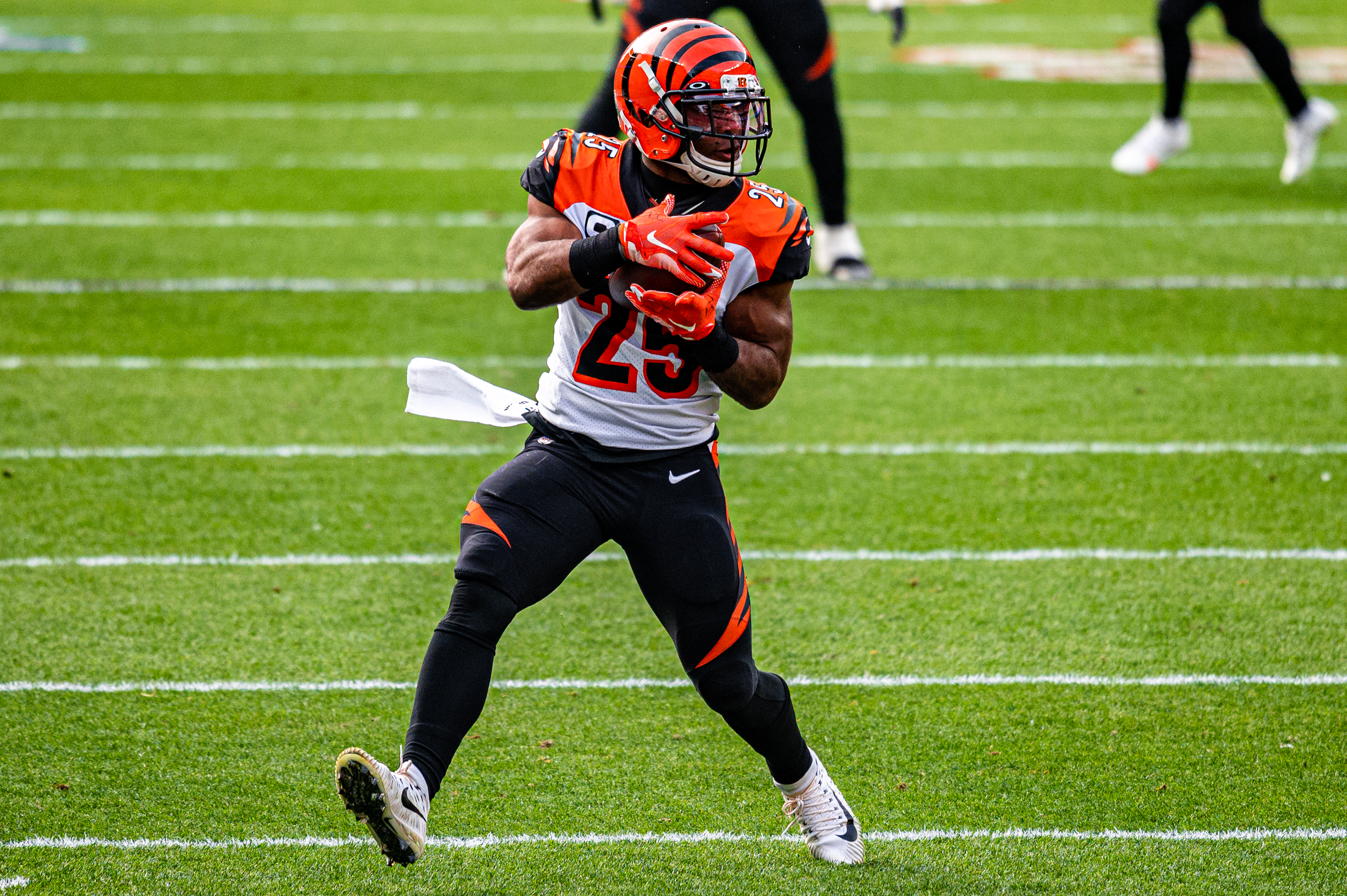
Bernard in 2019

On September 3, 2019, the Bengals signed Bernard to a two-year, $10.3 million contract extension. In a limited role behind Joe Mixon, Bernard totaled 53 carries for 170 yards and 30 receptions for 234 yards on the 2019 season.

==== 2020 season ====
During Week 8, Bernard recorded a rushing touchdown and a receiving touchdown against the Tennessee Titans in a 31–20 victory. In Week 15 against the Pittsburgh Steelers on Monday Night Football, Bernard recorded 97 yards from scrimmage, one rushing touchdown, and one receiving touchdown during the 27–17 victory. He finished the 2020 season with 124 carries for 416 yards and three touchdowns to go along with 47 receptions for 355 yards and three touchdowns.

The Bengals released Bernard on April 1, 2021.

=== Tampa Bay Buccaneers ===
==== 2021 season ====
Bernard signed with the Tampa Bay Buccaneers on April 14, 2021. He suffered a hip injury in Week 14 and was placed on injured reserve on December 14. Bernard finished the 2021 season with eight carries for 58 yards to go along with 23 receptions for 123 yards and three touchdowns. He was activated on January 15, 2022, for the Wild Card Round against the Philadelphia Eagles. Bernard scored a rushing touchdown in the 31–15 victory.

==== 2022 season ====
On April 1, 2022, Bernard re-signed with the Buccaneers. He suffered an ankle injury in Week 2 and was placed on injured reserve on September 21. Bernard was activated on November 26.

=== Retirement ===
Bernard announced his retirement via social media on April 28, 2023.

== Career statistics ==
=== NFL ===
==== Regular season ====
Year	Team	Games		Rushing					Receiving					Fumbles	
Year	Team	GP	GS	Att	Yds	Avg	Lng	TD	Rec	Yds	Avg	Lng	TD	Fum	Lost
2013	CIN	16	0	170	695	4.1	35T	5	56	514	9.2	41	3	1	1
2014	CIN	13	9	168	680	4.0	89T	5	43	349	8.1	46	2	0	0
2015	CIN	16	1	154	730	4.7	28	2	49	472	9.6	45	0	2	0
2016	CIN	10	2	91	337	3.7	17	2	39	336	8.6	32	1	1	1
2017	CIN	16	2	105	458	4.4	25	2	43	389	9.1	61T	2	0	0
2018	CIN	12	4	56	211	3.8	23	3	35	218	6.2	26	0	0	0
2019	CIN	16	2	53	170	3.2	25	0	30	234	7.8	35	0	1	1
2020	CIN	16	10	121	409	3.4	15	3	47	355	7.6	42	3	1	1
2021	TB	12	0	8	58	7.3	24	0	23	123	5.3	32	3	1	0
2022	TB	8	0	8	28	3.5	24	0	2	-1	-0.5	6	0	1	0
Career		135	30	937	3,783	4.0	89T	22	367	2,989	8.1	61T	14	9	4

==== Postseason ====
Year	Team	Games		Rushing					Receiving					Fumbles	
Year	Team	GP	GS	Att	Yds	Avg	Lng	TD	Rec	Yds	Avg	Lng	TD	Fum	Lost
2013	CIN	1	0	12	45	3.8	12	0	7	73	10.4	17	0	1	1
2014	CIN	1	0	3	6	2.0	6	0	8	46	5.8	13	0	0	0
2015	CIN	1	0	6	28	4.7	14	0	2	2	1.0	4	0	1	1
2021	TB	2	0	13	44	3.4	8	1	5	39	7.8	22	0	0	0
2022	TB	1	0	0	0	0.0	0	0	0	0	0.0	0	0	0	0
Career		6	0	34	123	3.6	14	1	22	160	7.3	22	0	2	2

=== College ===
Year	Team	Games		Rushing								Receiving						Punt Returns				
Year	Team	GP	GS	Att	Yds	Loss	Net	Avg	Lng	TD	Y/G	Rec	Yds	Avg	Lng	TD	Y/G	Ret	Yds	Avg	Lng	TD
2011	North Carolina	13	11	239	1,324	71	1,253	5.2	60	13	96.4	45	362	8.0	23	1	27.8	0	0	0.0	0	0
2012	North Carolina	10	10	184	1,270	42	1,228	6.7	68	12	122.8	47	490	10.4	78	5	49.0	16	263	16.4	74	2
Career		23	21	423	2,594	113	2,481	5.9	68	25	109.1	92	852	9.2	78	6	38.4	16	263	16.4	74	2

== Personal life ==
Bernard is a Catholic. He has two sons, Julien and Gabriel.
