= James Wright (wide receiver) =

American football player (born 1991)

No. 86, 17
- Position: Wide receiver

Personal information
- Born: December 31, 1991 (age 34); Buras, Louisiana, U.S.
- Listed height: 6 ft 1 in (1.85 m)
- Listed weight: 201 lb (91 kg)

Career information
- High school: Belle Chasse (LA)
- College: LSU
- NFL draft: 2014: 7th round, 239th overall pick

Career history
- Cincinnati Bengals (2014–2016); Cleveland Browns (2017)*; Indianapolis Colts (2018)
- * Offseason or practice squad member only

Career NFL statistics
- Receptions: 18
- Receiving yards: 197
- Total tackles: 17
- Forced fumbles: 2
- Stats at Pro Football Reference

James Earl Wright (born December 31, 1991) is an American former professional football player who was a wide receiver in the National Football League (NFL). He was selected by the Cincinnati Bengals in the seventh round of the 2014 NFL draft. He played college football for the LSU Tigers.

== Professional career ==
=== Cincinnati Bengals ===
Wright was selected by the Cincinnati Bengals in the seventh round (239th overall) of the 2014 NFL draft.

On October 12, 2014, Wright recorded his first career reception, in overtime against the Carolina Panthers, good for 24 yards and setting up a would-be game-winning field goal by the Bengals. However, the attempt was missed by Mike Nugent, ending the game in a 37-37 tie.

On November 30, 2014, Wright had a career-best 3 receptions for 59 yards, including a 30-yard reception late in the fourth quarter which helped the Bengals to a 14-13 victory over the Tampa Bay Buccaneers. However, on the same play, Wright tore his PCL and missed the rest of 2014 and all of 2015 seasons on Injured Reserve.

On August 1, 2016, Wright was activated off of the Physically Unable to Perform (PUP) list.

On March 13, 2017, Wright was released by the Bengals.

=== Cleveland Browns ===
On March 14, 2017, Wright was claimed off waivers by the Cleveland Browns. He was waived/injured by the Browns on August 5, 2017 and placed on injured reserve. He was released on August 30, 2017.

=== Indianapolis Colts ===
On January 2, 2018, Wright signed a reserve/future contract with the Indianapolis Colts. He was waived/injured on September 1, 2018 and was placed on injured reserve. He was released on April 30, 2019.
