= 2014 Indianapolis Colts season =

62nd season in franchise history

- Owner: Jim Irsay
- General manager: Ryan Grigson
- Head coach: Chuck Pagano
- Offensive coordinator: Pep Hamilton
- Defensive coordinator: Greg Manusky
- Home stadium: Lucas Oil Stadium

Results
- Record: 11–5
- Division place: 1st AFC South
- Playoffs: Won Wild Card Playoffs (vs. Bengals) 26–10; Won Divisional Playoffs (at Broncos) 24–13; Lost AFC Championship (at Patriots) 7–45
- All-Pros: 2: K Adam Vinatieri (1st team); P Pat McAfee (1st team)
- Pro Bowlers: 7: QB Andrew Luck; WR T. Y. Hilton; MLB D'Qwell Jackson; CB Vontae Davis; SS Mike Adams; K Adam Vinatieri; P Pat McAfee

Uniform
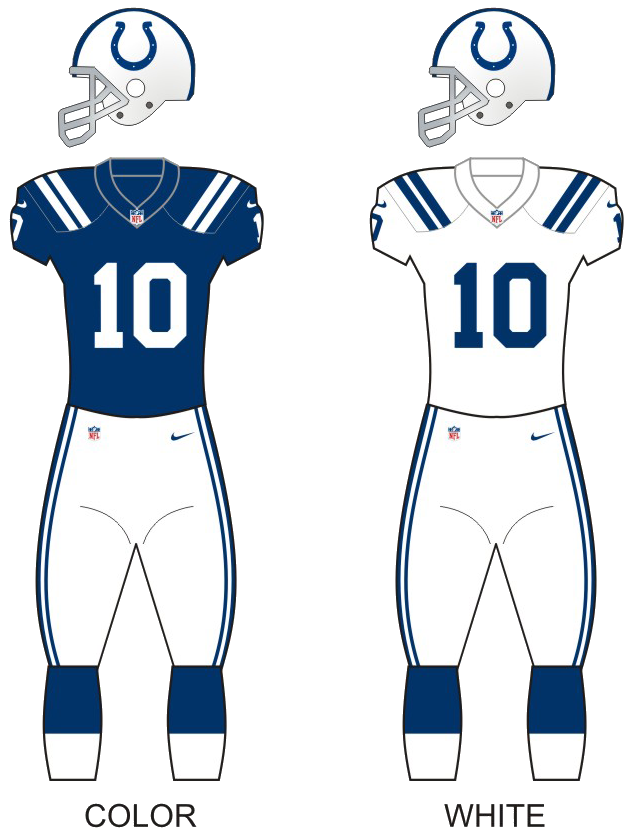

The 2014 season was the Indianapolis Colts' 62nd in the National Football League (NFL), their 31st in Indianapolis (equaling the number of seasons they played in Baltimore), their seventh playing their home games at Lucas Oil Stadium, and their third under head coach Chuck Pagano, general manager Ryan Grigson and quarterback Andrew Luck.

The Colts entered the 2014 season as the defending AFC South champions, after compiling an 11–5 record during the previous season and falling to the New England Patriots in the divisional round of the playoffs. They clinched their second straight division title with a 17–10 win over the Houston Texans in Week 15. They also went 6–0 in their division for the second straight year. In the postseason, the Colts would defeat both the Cincinnati Bengals and Denver Broncos before losing to the eventual Super Bowl Champion New England Patriots in the AFC Championship Game. The 2014 Colts failed to join the 2010 New York Jets and 2012 Baltimore Ravens as the only teams to beat both Tom Brady and Peyton Manning in the playoffs.

Behind former first overall draft pick Andrew Luck, the Colts became the first team since the AFL–NFL merger in 1970 to pass for 300 or more yards in eight consecutive games.

As of today, this is the deepest postseason run the Colts have ever had in the post-Peyton Manning era, and the only season since 2009 where they have made the AFC Championship Game. This also represents the most recent AFC South title for the Colts.

== Draft ==
2014 Indianapolis Colts draft
Round	Pick	Player	Position	College	Notes
2	59	Jack Mewhort	OT	Ohio St	
3	90	Donte Moncrief	WR	Ole Miss	
5	166	Jonathan Newsome	DE	Ball St	
6	203	Andrew Jackson	LB	Western Kentucky	
7	232	Ulrick John	OT	Georgia St	Pick from BAL
Made roster † Pro Football Hall of Fame * Made at least one Pro Bowl during career

Draft trades

- The Colts traded their original seventh-round selection (No. 241 overall) to the St. Louis Rams in exchange for cornerback Josh Gordy.
- The Colts acquired this seventh-round selection (No. 232 overall) in a trade that sent center A. Q. Shipley to the Baltimore Ravens.

== Roster moves ==
=== Departures ===
Position	Player	Tag	2014 Team	Notes
SS	Antoine Bethea	UFA	San Francisco 49ers	Signed by San Francisco on March 11, 2014.
RB	Donald Brown	UFA	San Diego Chargers	Signed by San Diego on March 12, 2014.
LB	Kavell Conner	UFA	San Diego Chargers	Signed by San Diego on March 13, 2014.
G	Jeff Linkenbach	UFA	Kansas City Chiefs	Signed by Kansas City on March 12, 2014.
G	Mike McGlynn	UFA	Washington Redskins	Signed by Washington on March 28, 2014.
WR	Darrius Heyward-Bey	UFA	Pittsburgh Steelers	Signed by Pittsburgh on April 2, 2014.
CB	Cassius Vaughn	UFA	Detroit Lions	Signed by Detroit on April 7, 2014.
LB	Pat Angerer	UFA	Atlanta Falcons	Signed by Atlanta on July 22, 2014.

=== Additions ===
Position	Player	Tag	2013 Team	Notes
T	Jack Breckner	UFA	Iowa Barnstormers	Signed by Indianapolis on February 5, 2014.
LB	Henoc Muamba	UFA	Winnipeg Blue Bombers	Signed by Indianapolis on February 6, 2014.
S	David Sims	UFA	Philadelphia Eagles	Signed by Indianapolis on February 10, 2014.
LB	D'Qwell Jackson	UFA	Cleveland Browns	Signed by Indianapolis on March 6, 2014.
DE	Arthur Jones	UFA	Baltimore Ravens	Signed by Indianapolis on March 11, 2014.
C	Phil Costa	UFA	Dallas Cowboys	Signed by Indianapolis on March 13, 2014. (retired on April 21, 2014)
WR	Hakeem Nicks	UFA	New York Giants	Signed by Indianapolis on March 15, 2014.
FB	Cameron White	UFA	None	Signed by Indianapolis on April 17, 2014.
S	Colt Anderson	UFA	Philadelphia Eagles	Signed by Indianapolis on April 21, 2014.
CB	Johnny Adams	UFA	Oakland Raiders	Signed by Indianapolis on June 4, 2014.
CB	Brandon Burton	WVR	Cincinnati Bengals	Claimed off of Waivers on June 12, 2014.
S	Mike Adams	UFA	Denver Broncos	Signed by Indianapolis on June 16, 2014.
NT	Brandon McKinney	UFA	Indianapolis Colts	Signed by Indianapolis on June 19, 2014.
G	Chad Anderson	UFA	Los Angeles Kiss	Signed by Indianapolis on July 16, 2014.
RB	Davin Meggett	UFA	Winnipeg Blue Bombers	Signed by Indianapolis on July 27, 2014.
RB	Phillip Tanner	UFA	Dallas Cowboys	Signed by Indianapolis on July 29, 2014.
LB	Shawn Loiseau	UFA	Los Angeles Kiss	Signed by Indianapolis on August 4, 2014.
OLB	Phillip Hunt	UFA	Philadelphia Eagles	Signed by Indianapolis on August 5, 2014.

=== Undrafted free agents ===
Position	Player	College
QB	Seth Lobato	Northern Colorado
RB	Zurlon Tipton	Central Michigan
WR	Eric Thomas	Troy
WR	Ryan Lankford	Illinois
WR	Tony Washington	Appalachian State
WR	Greg Moore	Lane College
WR	Aaron Burks	Boise State
WR	Nu'Keese Richardson	Upike
TE	Erik Swoope	Miami
C	Jonotthan Harrison	Florida
C	FN Lutz	Indiana State
G	Marcus Hall	Ohio State
G	Josh Walker	Middle Tennessee
T	Eric Pike	Towson
T	Matt Hall	Belhaven
DE	Tyler Hoover	Michigan State
DE	Nnamdi Obukwelu	Harvard
DE	Gannon Conway	Arizona State
NT	Zach Kerr	Delaware
LB	Jonathon Sharpe	North Greenville
CB	Qua Cox	Jackson State
CB	Keon Lyn	Syracuse
CB	Loucheiz Purifoy	Florida
CB	Kameron Jackson	Cal
S	Dewey McDonald	Calvulcans
K	Cody Parkey	Auburn

=== Suspensions ===
==== Robert Mathis ====
On May 16, it was announced the outside linebacker Robert Mathis was suspended for the first four games of the season for violating the league's substance-abuse policy. It was reported that Mathis took the drug Clomid, a male fertility drug. Greg Aiello, a spokesperson for the league said that the drug was not approved for fertility use in males by the FDA and has been banned by the league for years. It was announced on May 20 that the league would not hear Mathis' appeal on the suspension.

==== LaRon Landry ====
On September 29, it was announced the safety LaRon Landry was suspended for four games of the season for violating the league's substance-abuse policy.

=== Injuries ===
- July 25: Running back Vick Ballard suffered a torn left Achilles tendon on the second day of training camp and was later placed on the injured reserve.
- July 31: Left guard Donald Thomas suffered a torn right quad during training camp, which required season ending surgery.
- September 8: Outside linebacker Robert Mathis suffered a torn Achilles tendon during a personal workout. Mathis, who was suspended the first four game of the season, was later placed on the injured reserve and ruled out for the remainder of the season.

== Staff/Coaches ==
2014 Indianapolis Colts staff
Front office: Owner/CEO – Jim Irsay; General manager – Ryan Grigson; Vice president of football operations – Jimmy Raye III; Director of college scouting – T. J. McCreight; Director of football administration – Mike Bluem; Associate director of pro personnel – Kevin Rogers; Assistant director of college scouting – Todd Vasvari; Head coaches: Head coach – Chuck Pagano; Offensive coaches: Offensive coordinator – Pep Hamilton; Special assistant – Rob Chudzinski; Quarterbacks – Clyde Christensen; Running backs – David Walker; Wide receivers – Charlie Williams; Tight ends – Alfredo Roberts; Offensive line – Joe Gilbert; Assistant offensive line – Hal Hunter; Offensive assistant – Tim Berbenich; Offensive quality control – Frank Giufre	Defensive coaches: Defensive coordinator – Greg Manusky; Defensive line – Gary Emanuel; Linebackers – Jeff FitzGerald; Secondary – Mike Gillhamer; Safeties – Roy Anderson; Assistant linebackers – Brad White; Special teams coaches: Special teams coordinator – Tom McMahon; Assistant special teams – Brant Boyer; Strength and conditioning: Strength and conditioning – Roger Marandino; Assistant strength and conditioning – Richard Howell

== Final roster ==
2014 Indianapolis Colts roster
Quarterbacks (QB): 8 Matt Hasselbeck; 12 Andrew Luck; Running backs (RB): 36 Dan Herron; 34 Trent Richardson; 37 Zurlon Tipton; Wide receivers (WR): 16 Josh Cribbs RS; 13 T. Y. Hilton; 10 Donte Moncrief; 14 Hakeem Nicks; 87 Reggie Wayne; Tight ends (TE): 83 Dwayne Allen; 84 Jack Doyle; 80 Coby Fleener	Offensive linemen (OL): 74 Anthony Castonzo T; 78 Gosder Cherilus T; 72 Jonotthan Harrison C; 62 Khaled Holmes C; 60 Lance Louis G; 75 Jack Mewhort G; 71 Xavier Nixon T; 76 Joe Reitz G/T; 63 A. Q. Shipley C/G; 69 Hugh Thornton G; Defensive linemen (DL): 96 Josh Chapman NT; 95 Montori Hughes NT; 99 Ricky Jean Francois DE; 97 Arthur Jones DE; 94 Zach Kerr DE; 90 Cory Redding DE	Linebackers (LB): 50 Jerrell Freeman ILB; 54 Andrew Jackson ILB; 52 D'Qwell Jackson ILB; 57 Josh McNary ILB; 51 Hénoc Muamba ILB; 91 Jonathan Newsome OLB; 55 Shaun Phillips OLB; 58 Andy Studebaker OLB; 93 Erik Walden OLB; 92 Björn Werner OLB; Defensive backs (DB): 29 Mike Adams SS; 32 Colt Anderson SS; 25 Jalil Brown CB; 38 Sergio Brown FS; 20 Darius Butler CB; 21 Vontae Davis CB; 27 Josh Gordy CB/FS; 30 LaRon Landry FS; 31 Dewey McDonald FS; 40 Sheldon Price CB; 28 Greg Toler CB; Special teams (ST): 1 Pat McAfee P; 45 Matt Overton LS; 4 Adam Vinatieri K	Practice squad: 65 David Arkin G; 53 Carlos Fields LB; 35 Jeff Demps RB; 26 Winston Guy S; 67 Nnamdi Obukwelu DE; 64 Tyler Hoover T; 85 Ryan Lankford WR; 11 Josh Lenz WR; 73 Kelcy Quarles DE; 86 Erik Swoope TE; 17 Griff Whalen WR; Reserve: 56 Daniel Adongo OLB (IR); 33 Vick Ballard RB (IR); 44 Ahmad Bradshaw RB (IR); 73 Matt Hall T (IR); 26 Delano Howell FS (IR); 59 Cam Johnson OLB (IR); 68 Ulrick John T (IR); 43 Shawn Loiseau ILB (IR); 98 Robert Mathis OLB (NF-Inj.); 95 Fili Moala DE (IR); 48 Aaron Morgan OLB (IR); 61 Jeris Pendleton DE (IR); 66 Donald Thomas G (IR); Rookies in italics 53 active, 13 reserve, 10 practice squad

== Schedule ==
=== Preseason ===
Week	Date	Opponent	Result	Record	Venue	Recap
1	August 7	at New York Jets	**L** 10–13	0–1	MetLife Stadium	Recap
2	August 16	New York Giants	**L** 26–27	0–2	Lucas Oil Stadium	Recap
3	August 23	New Orleans Saints	**L** 17–23	0–3	Lucas Oil Stadium	Recap
4	August 28	at Cincinnati Bengals	**L** 7–35	0–4	Paul Brown Stadium	Recap

=== Regular season ===
Week	Date	Opponent	Result	Record	Venue	Recap
1	September 7	at Denver Broncos	**L** 24–31	0–1	Sports Authority Field at Mile High	Recap
2	September 15	Philadelphia Eagles	**L** 27–30	0–2	Lucas Oil Stadium	Recap
3	September 21	at **Jacksonville Jaguars**	**W** 44–17	1–2	EverBank Field	Recap
4	September 28	**Tennessee Titans**	**W** 41–17	2–2	Lucas Oil Stadium	Recap
5	October 5	Baltimore Ravens	**W** 20–13	3–2	Lucas Oil Stadium	Recap
6	October 9	at **Houston Texans**	**W** 33–28	4–2	NRG Stadium	Recap
7	October 19	Cincinnati Bengals	**W** 27–0	5–2	Lucas Oil Stadium	Recap
8	October 26	at Pittsburgh Steelers	**L** 34–51	5–3	Heinz Field	Recap
9	November 3	at New York Giants	**W** 40–24	6–3	MetLife Stadium	Recap
10	Bye					
11	November 16	New England Patriots	**L** 20–42	6–4	Lucas Oil Stadium	Recap
12	November 23	**Jacksonville Jaguars**	**W** 23–3	7–4	Lucas Oil Stadium	Recap
13	November 30	Washington Redskins	**W** 49–27	8–4	Lucas Oil Stadium	Recap
14	December 7	at Cleveland Browns	**W** 25–24	9–4	FirstEnergy Stadium	Recap
15	December 14	**Houston Texans**	**W** 17–10	10–4	Lucas Oil Stadium	Recap
16	December 21	at Dallas Cowboys	**L** 7–42	10–5	AT&T Stadium	Recap
17	December 28	at **Tennessee Titans**	**W** 27–10	11–5	LP Field	Recap

Note: Intra-division opponents are in bold text.

=== Postseason ===
Round	Date	Opponent (seed)	Result	Record	Venue	Recap
Wild Card	January 4	Cincinnati Bengals (5)	**W** 26–10	1–0	Lucas Oil Stadium	Recap
Divisional	January 11	at Denver Broncos (2)	**W** 24–13	2–0	Sports Authority Field at Mile High	Recap
AFC Championship	January 18	at New England Patriots (1)	**L** 7–45	2–1	Gillette Stadium	Recap

== Game summaries ==
=== Regular season ===
==== Week 1: at Denver Broncos ====
Week One: Indianapolis Colts at Denver Broncos – Game summary

Quarter	1	2	3	4	Total
Colts	0	7	3	14	24
Broncos	3	21	0	7	31

at Sports Authority Field at Mile High, Denver, Colorado

- Date: September 7
- Game time: 8:30 p.m. EDT/6:30 p.m. MDT
- Game weather: 75 °F (24 °C), mostly sunny
- Game attendance: 76,939
- Referee: Tony Corrente
- TV announcers (NBC): Al Michaels (play-by-play), Cris Collinsworth (color commentator) and Michele Tafoya (sideline reporter)
- Recap, Gamebook

Game information

First quarter

- DEN – 05:17 Brandon McManus 21-yard FG. Drive 16 plays, 77 yards, 6:35. (DEN 3–0)

Second quarter

- DEN – 14:19 Julius Thomas 3-yard TD pass from Peyton Manning, Brandon McManus kick. Drive 8 plays, 54 yards, 4:00. (DEN 10–0)
- DEN – 6:50 Julius Thomas 35-yard TD pass from Peyton Manning, Brandon McManus kick. Drive 9 plays, 83 yards, 5:24. (DEN 17–0)
- DEN – 2:00 Julius Thomas 5-yard TD pass from Peyton Manning, Brandon McManus kick. Drive 7 plays, 71 yards, 3:13. (DEN 24–0)
- IND – 0:28 Andrew Luck 9-yard TD run, Adam Vinatieri kick. Drive 8 plays, 80 yards, 1:38. (DEN 24–7)

Third quarter

- IND – 1:34 Adam Vinatieri 25-yard FG. Drive 11 plays, 60 yards, 5:58. (DEN 24–10)

Fourth quarter

- DEN – 10:02 Montee Ball 3-yard TD run, Brandon McManus kick. Drive 6 plays, 48 yards, 3:31. (DEN 31–10)
- IND – 7:57 Dwayne Allen 41-yard TD pass from Andrew Luck, Adam Vinatieri kick. Drive 7 plays, 80 yards, 2:08. (DEN 31–17)
- IND – 3:32 Hakeem Nicks 9-yard TD pass from Andrew Luck, Adam Vinatieri kick. Drive 5 plays, 45 yards, 0:49. (DEN 31–24)

Top passers

- IND – Andrew Luck – 35/53, 370 yards, 2 TDs, 2 INTs
- DEN – Peyton Manning – 22/36, 269 yards, 3 TDs

Top rushers

- IND – Trent Richardson – 6 carries, 20 yards
- DEN – Montee Ball – 23 carries, 67 yards, 1 TD

Top receivers

- IND – Reggie Wayne – 9 receptions, 98 yards
- DEN – Julius Thomas – 7 receptions, 104 yards, 3 TDs

Top tacklers

- IND – LaRon Landry – 7 tackles, 1 assist
- DEN – Brandon Marshall – 7 tackles, 2 assist

The Colts began the season on the road against the defending AFC champion Denver Broncos. The Colts began the game on offense, driving down to the Broncos' 36-yard line. However, following a delay of game penalty, they were forced to punt. Peyton Manning led the Broncos' offense on a 16-play drive, but would settle only for a field goal, giving Denver a 3–0 lead. An Andrew Luck interception on the Colts' ensuing offensive possession set the Broncos up at midfield and would lead to a touchdown on a pass from Manning to Julius Thomas to give the Broncos a 10–0 lead. After a three and out from the Colts' offense, Manning and the Broncos again take advantage and drive 83-yard to score on another Thomas touchdown reception. Late in the second quarter, the Broncos again scored on a touchdown pass from Manning to Thomas and extended Denver's lead to 24–0 with two minutes remaining in the half. The Colts put together an 8-play, 80-yard drive to end the half and scored their first points on a 9-yard run from Luck, making the score 24–7 in favor of Denver at halftime.

The Broncos' began the second half on offense, though they were eventually forced to punt. After driving into the red zone on their first offensive possession of the half, the Colts' failed to convert a fourth down on the goal line and turned the ball over on downs. The Colts' next offensive possession would again stall in the red zone, with the Colts settling for an Adam Vinatieri field goal, cutting the Bronco lead to 24–10. A 48-yard drive early in the fourth quarter gave the Broncos as 31–10 lead after a Montee Ball touchdown run. The Colts would respond on their next drive with a touchdown pass from Luck to Dwayne Allen, cutting the Broncos' lead down to two scores. The Colts failed to take advantage of a recovered onside kick, after Luck threw an interception in Broncos' territory. After the Colts defense forced a three and out, Luck again drove the Colts down to the goal line, eventually scoring on a touchdown pass to Hakeem Nicks. After again stopping the Broncos' offense, the Colts received the ball with a little under three minutes remaining in the game and a change to tie the game. Though the Colts would drive into Bronco territory, the drive would end after a failed fourth down pass attempt from Luck to Reggie Wayne. With the loss, the Colts began the season with an 0–1 record.

==== Week 2: vs. Philadelphia Eagles ====
Week Two: Philadelphia Eagles at Indianapolis Colts – Game summary

Quarter	1	2	3	4	Total
Eagles	3	3	14	10	30
Colts	7	10	3	7	27

at Lucas Oil Stadium, Indianapolis, Indiana

- Date: September 15
- Game time: 8:30 p.m. EDT
- Game weather: Played indoors (retractable roof closed)
- Game attendance: 64,871
- Referee: Terry McAulay
- TV announcers (ESPN): Mike Tirico (play-by-play), Jon Gruden (color commentator) and Lisa Salters (sideline reporter)
- Recap, Gamebook

Game information

First quarter

- PHI – 9:48 Cody Parkey 31-yard FG. Drive: 11 plays, 69 yards, 3:45. (PHI 3–0)
- IND – 5:18 Ahmad Bradshaw 1-yard TD pass from Andrew Luck, Adam Vinatieri kick. Drive: 9 plays, 72 yards, 4:30. (IND 7–3)

Second quarter

- IND – 13:18 Adam Vinatieri 46-yard FG. Drive: 11 plays, 44 yards, 5:58. (IND 10–3)
- PHI – 6:36 Cody Parkey 23-yard FG. Drive: 12 plays, 58 yards, 3:41. (IND 10–6)
- IND – 1:13 Jack Doyle 2-yard TD pass from Andrew Luck, Adam Vinatieri kick. Drive: 10 plays, 58 yards, 5:23. (IND 17–6)

Third quarter

- IND – 6:43 Adam Vinatieri 27-yard FG. Drive: 10 plays, 62 yards, 3:45. (IND 20–6)
- PHI – 4:32 LeSean McCoy 1-yard TD run, Cody Parkey kick. Drive: 7 plays, 80 yards, 2:11. (IND 20–13)
- PHI – 2:44 Darren Sproles 19-yard TD run, Cody Parkey kick. Drive: 5 plays, 26 yards, 1:42. (tied 20–20)

Fourth quarter

- IND – 11:49 Ahmad Bradshaw 7-yard TD pass from Andrew Luck, Adam Vinatieri kick. Drive: 12 plays, 80 yards, 5:55. (IND 27–20)
- PHI – 3:25 Jeremy Maclin 6-yard TD pass from Nick Foles, Adam Vinatieri kick. Drive: 5 plays, 76 yards, 1:43. (tied 27–27)
- PHI – 0:00 Cody Parkey 36-yard FG. Drive: 4 plays, 42 yards, 1:56. (PHI 30–27)

Top passers

- PHI – Nick Foles: 21/37, 331 yards, 1 TD, 1 INT
- IND – Andrew Luck: 20/34, 172 yards, 3 TD, 1 INT

Top rushers

- PHI – LeSean McCoy: 20 carries, 79 yards, 1 TD
- IND – Trent Richardson: 21 carries, 79 yards

Top receivers

- PHI – Darren Sproles: 7 receptions, 152 yards
- IND – T. Y. Hilton: 6 receptions, 65 yards

Top tacklers

- PHI – DeMeco Ryans: 7 tackles, 3 assists
- IND – Mike Adams: 8 tackles

After losing to the Broncos in the season opener, the Colts faced the Philadelphia Eagles in their first home game of the season on Monday night. After a three and out on the Colts' opening possession, the Eagles, led by quarterback Nick Foles, drove down the field and settled for a 31-yard field goal to give them an early 3–0 lead. On their ensuing offensive drive, the Colts drove 72 yards in nine plays and scored on an Andrew Luck touchdown pass to Ahmad Bradshaw, giving the Colts their first lead at 7–3. The Colts extended their lead early in the second quarter on a 46-yard Adam Vinatieri field goal to 10–3. Later in the second quarter, the Eagles closed the gap after a 23-yard field goal from Cody Parkey. The next Colts possession ended in a Luck touchdown pass to Jack Doyle, extending their lead to 17–6 at halftime.

The Colts scored on their second offensive possession of the third quarter, with a field goal from Vinatieri, giving the Colts a two possession lead at 20–6. Philadelphia responded on their next drive after driving 80 yards in seven plays and scoring on 1-yard touchdown run from LeSean McCoy, making the score 20–13. After a fumble by running back Trent Richardson on the Colts next offensive possession, set up the Eagles to tie the game on a 19-yard touchdown run from Darren Sproles. On the first possession of the fourth quarter, the Colts offense drive 80 yards to reclaim the lead on a pass from Luck to Bradshaw and giving the Colts a 27–20 lead. The Colts failed to put away the Eagles, after Luck threw an interception during a play that involved a controversial no-call penalty on the Colts next offensive drive, which set up a five play drive, that allowed the Eagles to tie the game at 27–27. After a three and out on the next Colts possession, the Eagles took possession of the ball at their own forty yard line. Foles and the Eagles offense drove 42 yards to the Colts 18 yard line, with Parkey hitting a 36-yard field goal as time expired, which gave the Eagles the 30–27 victory. With the loss, the Colts dropped to 0–2 for only the third time since 1998.

==== Week 3: at Jacksonville Jaguars ====
Week Three: Indianapolis Colts at Jacksonville Jaguars – Game summary

Quarter	1	2	3	4	Total
Colts	10	20	0	14	44
Jaguars	0	0	3	14	17

at EverBank Field, Jacksonville, Florida

- Date: September 21
- Game time: 1:00 p.m. EDT
- Game weather: 85 °F (29 °C), clear
- Game attendance: 60,601
- Referee: Walt Coleman
- TV announcers (CBS): Tom McCarthy (play-by-play) and Adam Archuleta (color commentator)
- Recap, Gamebook

Game information

First quarter

- IND – 9:37 Adam Vinatieri 48-yard FG. Drive: 12 plays, 50 yards, 5:23. (IND 3–0)
- IND – 1:50 Ahmad Bradshaw 6-yard TD pass from Andrew Luck, Adam Vinatieri kick. Drive: 9 plays, 74 yards, 5:46. (IND 10–0)

Second quarter

- IND – 12:28 Dwayne Allen 1-yard TD pass from Andrew Luck, Adam Vinatieri kick. Drive: 7 plays, 76 yards, 3:27. (IND 17–0)
- IND – 6:36 Adam Vinatieri 43-yard FG. Drive: 6 plays, 33 yards, 2:07. (IND 20–0)
- IND – 1:10 Adam Vinatieri 25-yard FG. Drive: 9 plays, 73 yards, 4:14. (IND 23–0)
- IND – 0:28 Coby Fleener 7-yard TD pass from Andrew Luck, Adam Vinatieri kick. Drive: 4 plays, 29 yards, 0:31. (IND 30–0)

Third quarter

- JAX – 5:13 Josh Scobee 41-yard FG. Drive: 8 plays, 59 yards, 3:07. (IND 30–3)

Fourth quarter

- IND – 8:53 Hakeem Nicks 1-yard TD pass from Andrew Luck, Adam Vinatieri kick. Drive: 10 plays, 64 yards, 4:42. (IND 37–3)
- JAX – 6:52 Allen Hurns 63-yard TD pass from Blake Bortles, Josh Scobee kick. Drive: 5 plays, 80 yards, 2:02. (IND 37–10)
- IND – 2:58 Greg Toler 47-yard interception return for TD, Adam Vinatieri kick. (IND 44–10)
- JAX – 0:18 Cecil Shorts III 10-yard TD pass from Blake Bortles, Josh Scobee kick. Drive: 8 plays, 80 yards, 2:40. (IND 44–17)

Top passers

- IND – Andrew Luck: 31/39, 370 yards, 4 TD
- JAX – Blake Bortles: 14/24, 223 yards, 2 TD, 2 INT

Top rushers

- IND – Ahmad Bradshaw: 9 carries, 65 yards, 1 Rec TD
- JAX – Denard Robinson: 8 carries, 33 yards

Top receivers

- IND – T. Y. Hilton: 5 receptions, 80 yards
- JAX – Allen Robinson: 7 receptions, 79 yards

Top tacklers

- IND – D'Qwell Jackson: 10 tackles, 1 sack, 1 forced fumble
- JAX – Paul Posluszny: 7 tackles, 4 assists

After back-to-back losses to begin the season, the Colts faced their AFC South rival, the Jacksonville Jaguars. The Colts opened the game on offense and put together a twelve play, 50-yard drive that ended in an Adam Vinatieri field goal, giving the Colts an early 3–0 lead. Following a three and out forced by the Colts defense, Andrew Luck again drove the offense down the field, this time scoring on a touchdown throw Ahmad Bradshaw, extending the Colts' lead to 10–0 at the end of the first quarter. The Colts again extended their lead early in the second quarter on a pass from Luck to Dwayne Allen. The Jaguars were again stopped by the Colts defense on their next offensive possession, with the Colts defense preventing the Jaguars for converting a first down on their first three possessions. The Colts' offense, though they would deep into Jaguars' territory, were forced to settle for Vinatieri field goals on their next two offensive possessions, giving them a 23–0 lead. After a fumble recovery by Darius Butler late in the first half, they were set up with good field position in Jaguars territory. A Luck touchdown pass to Coby Fleener extended the Colts' lead to 30–0 at halftime.

After struggling to move the ball in the first half, the Jaguars replaced quarterback Chad Henne with rookie Blake Bortles. The Jaguars were able to convert a first down on their first drive of the half, though they were forced to punt following a penalty that sent them back to midfield. On the Jaguars' next possession, they again drove into Colts' territory, enough to get their first points of the game on a 41-yard field goal from Josh Scobee. At the end of the third quarter, the Colts continued to hold a commanding 30–3 lead. The Colts scored their first points of the second half on a pass from Luck to Hakeem Nicks early in the fourth quarter. Bortles threw his first career touchdown pass on the Jaguars' next possession, throwing it to Allen Hurns. With the large lead late in the game, the Colts replaced Luck with backup quarterback Matt Hasselbeck. Late in the fourth quarter the Colts defense extended the lead, with an interception returned for a touchdown by Greg Toler. A Bortles pass to Cecil Shorts III was the last scoring play of the game, giving the Colts the 44–17 win.

At the end of the game, Andrew Luck completed 31 of 39 pass attempts for 370 yards and four touchdown passes, which earned him the honor of AFC Offensive Player of the Week. The game marked the first win of the season for the Colts and improved their overall record to 1–2.

As of 2026, this remains the last time the Colts defeated the Jaguars in Jacksonville.

==== Week 4: vs. Tennessee Titans ====
Week Four: Tennessee Titans at Indianapolis Colts – Game summary

Quarter	1	2	3	4	Total
Titans	0	10	7	0	17
Colts	14	6	14	7	41

at Lucas Oil Stadium, Indianapolis, Indiana

- Date: September 28, 2014
- Game time: 1:00 p.m. EDT/12:00 p.m. CDT
- Game weather: 78 °F (26 °C), partly sunny (retractable roof open)
- Game attendance: 64,757
- Referee: Jerome Boger
- TV announcers (CBS): Kevin Harlan and Rich Gannon
- Recap, Gamebook

Game information

First quarter

- IND – Trent Richardson 1-yard run (Adam Vinatieri kick), 7:06. Colts 7–0. Drive: 2 plays, 38 yards, 0:34.
- IND – Dwayne Allen 7-yard pass from Andrew Luck (Adam Vinatieri kick), 0:52. Colts 14–0. Drive: 11 plays, 44 yards, 6:14.

Second quarter

- IND – Adam Vinatieri 31-yard field goal, 10:25. Colts 17–0. Drive: 10 plays, 60 yards, 4:18.
- TEN – Ryan Succop 36-yard field goal, 6:24. Colts 17–3. Drive: 6 plays, 51 yards, 1:40.
- IND – Adam Vinatieri 30-yard field goal, 1:53. Colts 20–3. Drive: 10 plays, 65 yards, 4:31.
- TEN – Delanie Walker 7-yard pass from Charlie Whitehurst (Ryan Succop kick), 0:13. Colts 20–10. Drive: 3 plays, 25 yards, 0:32.

Third quarter

- IND – Reggie Wayne 28-yard pass from Andrew Luck (Adam Vinatieri kick), 8:15. Colts 27–10. Drive: 9 plays, 91 yards, 4:04.
- IND – Coby Fleener 2-yard pass from Andrew Luck (Adam Vinatieri kick), 4:02. Colts 34–10. Drive: 4 plays, 70 yards, 2:04.
- TEN – Bishop Sankey 2-yard run (Ryan Succop kick), 0:35. Colts 34–17. Drive: 8 plays, 80 yards, 3:27.

Fourth quarter

- IND – Ahmad Bradshaw 15-yard pass from Andrew Luck (Adam Vinatieri kick), 9:56. Colts 41–17. Drive: 10 plays, 80 yards, 5:39.

Top passers

- TEN – Charlie Whitehurst – 12/23, 177 yards, TD, INT
- IND – Andrew Luck – 29/41, 393 yards, 4 TD, INT

Top rushers

- TEN – Charlie Whitehurst – 5 rushes, 40 yards
- IND – Trent Richardson – 20 rushes, 47 yards, TD

Top receivers

- TEN – Delanie Walker – 5 receptions, 84 yards, TD
- IND – Reggie Wayne – 7 receptions, 119 yards, TD

Following their first win of the season, the Colts faced another divisional rival in the Tennessee Titans. After being forced to punt on their first offensive drive, the Colts' defense forced a fumble that was recovered by Ricky Jean-Francois and set up the Colts inside Titan territory. After a 37-yard pass from quarterback Andrew Luck to T. Y. Hilton set the Colts up at the one yard line, Trent Richardson scored on the next play, putting the Colts up 7–0. An onside kick gave the ball back to the Colts, which led to an eleven play, 44-yard drive that ended in a touchdown pass from Luck to Dwayne Allen. The Colts' defense again forced a turnover on the Titans' next possession, with Charlie Whitehurst throwing an interception to Mike Adams. Luck and the Colts' offense again drove down the field, though this time having to settle for a field goal, extending the lead to 17–0. Tennessee scored their first points midway through the second quarter on a Ryan Succop. The Colts responded on their next possession with a 30-yard field goal from Adam Vinatieri. A Luck interception late in the half, set up the Titans in Colts' territory and allowed them to score on a pass from Whitehurst to Delanie Walker, cutting the Colts' lead to 20–10 at halftime.

The Colts' scored on their first offensive possession of the second half, on a 28-yard touchdown pass from Luck to Reggie Wayne and then later in the quarter on a pass from Luck to Coby Fleener, extending the Colts' lead to 34–10. Tennessee responded with an eight play, 80-yard drive that ended with a touchdown run from Bishop Sankey. Luck completed his fourth touchdown pass of the game early in the fourth quarter, this time on a 15-yard pass to Ahmad Bradshaw, giving the Colts a 41–17 lead. Late in the game, Adams again forced another turnover, with Zach Mettenberger throwing the interception.

During the game, Reggie Wayne caught seven passes for 119 yards and one touchdown, which was enough to move him to seventh on the NFL all-time receptions list and tenth on the most receiving yards list. With the win, the Colts improved to 2–2.

==== Week 5: vs. Baltimore Ravens ====
Week Five: Baltimore Ravens at Indianapolis Colts – Game summary

Quarter	1	2	3	4	Total
Ravens	0	3	0	10	13
Colts	3	3	7	7	20

at Lucas Oil Stadium, Indianapolis, Indiana

- Date: October 5
- Game time: 1:00 p.m. EDT
- Game weather: 53 °F (12 °C), sunny (retractable roof open)
- Game attendance: 65,258
- Referee: Walt Anderson
- TV announcers (CBS): Kevin Harlan (play-by-play) and Rich Gannon (color commentator)
- Recap Gamebook

Game information

First quarter

- IND – 9:44 Adam Vinatieri 38-yard FG. Drive 4 plays, 2 yards, 0:49. (IND 3–0)

Second quarter

- IND – 0:35 Adam Vinatieri 34-yard FG. Drive 20 plays, 70 yards, 9:30. (IND 6–0)
- BAL – 0:00 Justin Tucker 52-yard FG. Drive 6 plays, 47 yards, 0:35. (IND 6–3)

Third quarter

- IND – 10:33 Dwayne Allen 6-yard TD pass from Andrew Luck, Adam Vinatieri kick. Drive 7 plays, 33 yards, 2:47. (IND 13–3)

Fourth quarter

- BAL – 13:56 Justin Tucker 27-yard FG. Drive: 4 plays, 3 yards, 0:47. (IND 13–6)
- IND – 8:56 Andrew Luck 13-yard TD run, Adam Vinatieri kick. Drive: 8 plays, 80 yards, 5:00. (IND 20–6)
- BAL – 7:16 Justin Forsett 11-yard TD run, Justin Tucker kick. Drive 4 plays, 80 yards, 1:40. (IND 20–13)

Top passers

- BAL – Joe Flacco: 22/38, 235 yards, 1 INT
- IND – Andrew Luck: 32/49, 312 yards, 1 TD, 1 Rush TD, 2 INT

Top rushers

- BAL – Justin Forsett: 6 carries, 42 yards, 1 TD
- IND – Ahmad Bradshaw: 15 carries, 68 yards

Top receivers

- BAL – Justin Forsett: 7 receptions, 55 yards
- IND – T. Y. Hilton: 9 receptions, 90 yards

Top tacklers

- BAL – C. J. Mosley: 8 tackles, 6 assists, 1 INT
- IND – Jerrell Freeman: 5 tackles, 2 assists

Following back to back wins over division rivals, the Colts' returned to Lucas Oil Stadium to face the Baltimore Ravens. Andrew Luck and the Colts' offense drove 59 yards on their first offensive possession, with the drive ending on a turnover after the Colts failed to convert a fourth down. On the first play of the Ravens' offensive possession, Steve Smith fumbled the ball, which was then recovered by Montori Hughes of the Colts. The Colts settled for a 38-yard field goal by Adam Vinatieri, giving then an early 3–0 lead. A muffed punt return by Jacoby Jones resulted in a second Ravens' turnover, however, on the ensuing Colts' drive, Haloti Ngata intercepted Luck, their first turnover of the game. After a stalled Ravens' drive early in the second quarter, the Colts drove 70 yards in 20 plays, though they again settled for a Vinatieri. The Ravens responded, scoring on a 52-yard field goal from Justin Tucker as time expired, cutting the Colts' lead to 6–3 at halftime.

The Ravens opened the second half on offense and committed their third turnover on a Joe Flacco interception by Vontae Davis. The Colts' took advantage of the turnover, by scoring their first touchdown on a Luck touchdown pass from Dwayne Allen, giving them a 13–3 lead. The Ravens' defense again stepped up later in the third quarter, forcing the Colts' second turnover on a Luck interception by C.J. Mosley, which resulted in a second Tucker field goal. The Colts again extended their lead early in the fourth quarter on a Luck touchdown run, which gave the Colts a two possession lead at 20–6. The Ravens closed the gap again on their ensuing possession, Justin Forsett 11-yard touchdown run, cutting the lead back to one possession. After driving down to the Ravens' 10-yard line, Colts running back Ahmad Bradshaw fumbled the ball, giving the Ravens possession with under two minutes remaining in the game. The Colts' defense forced a turnover on downs and sealed the 20–13 win. With the win, the Colts improved to 3–2.

==== Week 6: at Houston Texans ====
Week Six: Indianapolis Colts at Houston Texans – Game summary

Quarter	1	2	3	4	Total
Colts	24	3	6	0	33
Texans	0	14	7	7	28

at NRG Stadium, Houston, Texas

- Date: October 9
- Game time: 8:30 p.m. EDT/7:30 p.m. CDT
- Game weather: Played indoors (retractable roof closed)
- Game attendance: 71,787
- Referee: Ron Torbert
- TV announcers (CBS/NFLN): Jim Nantz (play-by-play), Phil Simms (color commentator) and Tracy Wolfson (sideline reporter)
- Recap, Gamebook

Game information

First quarter

- IND – 11:13 Adam Vinatieri 27-yard FG. Drive: 9 plays, 54 yards, 2:46. (IND 3–0)
- IND – 10:40 Trent Richardson 5-yard TD run, Adam Vinatieri kick. Drive: 2 plays, 54 yards, 0:33. (IND 10–0)
- IND – 7:00 Ahmad Bradshaw 5-yard TD pass from Andrew Luck, Adam Vinatieri kick. Drive 7 plays, 56 yards, 2:15. (IND 17–0)
- IND – 0:00 Coby Fleener 4-yard TD pass from Andrew Luck, Adam Vinatieri kick. Drive 11 plays, 68 yards, 5:02. (IND 24–0)

Second quarter

- HOU – 9:43 Andre Johnson 5-yard TD pass from Ryan Fitzpatrick, Randy Bullock kick. Drive 11 plays, 80 yards, 5:17. (IND 24–7)
- HOU – 8:22 Arian Foster 12-yard TD run, Randy Bullock kick. Drive 3 plays, 26 yards, 1:06. (IND 24–14)
- IND – 1:05 Adam Vinatieri 34-yard FG. Drive: 15 plays, 62 yards, 7:17. (IND 27–14)

Third quarter

- HOU – 5:59 Arian Foster 2-yard TD run, Randy Bullock kick. Drive 4 plays, 70 yards, 1:05. (IND 27–21)
- IND – 0:00 T. Y. Hilton 33-yard TD pass from Andrew Luck, 2-point conversion failed. Drive 7 plays, 80 yards, 3:07. (IND 33–21)

Fourth quarter

- HOU – 10:36 J. J. Watt 45-yard fumble recovery TD, Randy Bullock kick. (IND 33–28)

Top passers

- IND – Andrew Luck: 25/44, 370 yards, 3 TD, 1 INT
- HOU – Ryan Fitzpatrick: 15/23, 212 yards, 1 TD

Top rushers

- IND – Trent Richardson: 17 carries, 41 yards, 1 TD
- HOU – Arian Foster: 20 carries, 109 yards, 2 TD

Top receivers

- IND – T. Y. Hilton: 9 receptions, 223 yards, 1 TD
- HOU – Andre Johnson: 7 receptions, 99 yards, 1 TD

Top tacklers

- IND – D'Qwell Jackson: 5 tackles, 2 assists, 1 sack, 1 fumble recovery
- HOU – Kendrick Lewis: 6 tackles, 4 assists

Following three straight wins, the Colts traveled to NRG Stadium for a divisional matchup against the Houston Texans on Thursday Night Football. The Colts' defense forced a three and out on the first possession of the game. The Colts settled for a 27-yard Adam Vinatieri field goal to give them a 3–0 lead. Following a recovered onside kick by the Colts, the Colts scored in two plays on a Trent Richardson touchdown run. On the Colts' next offensive drive, they scored on a touchdown pass from Andrew Luck to Ahmad Bradshaw, extending their lead to 17–0. A Coby Fleener touchdown pass from Luck capped off the first quarter, with the Colts leading 24–0. After failing to convert a first down the entire first quarter, the Texans moved the chains on their first possession of the second quarter, and following an 11-play drive, scored their first points on a touchdown pass from Ryan Fitzpatrick to Andre Johnson. Houston linebacker Justin Tuggle intercepted Luck on the Colts' next offensive possession, which set up a 3-play, 26-yard drive that ended with an Arian Foster touchdown run, closing Colts' lead to 24–14. The Colts responded with a 15-play drive that ended in a Vinatieri field goal, and extended their lead to 27–14 going into halftime.

The Texans scored the first points on the second half on their offensive possession, scoring on another Foster touchdown run, which cut the Colts lead to one possession. Luck and the Colts responded on their ensuing possession, driving 80 yards and scoring on a 33-yard touchdown pass from Luck to T. Y. Hilton. After a failed two-point conversion attempt, the Colts led 33–21 at the end of the third quarter. Midway through the fourth quarter, Texans' defensive end J. J. Watt forced a fumble that was returned for 45-yards for a touchdown and again closing the Colts' lead to one possession. Fumbles on the two ensuing Texan possessions ensured the Colts' 33–28 win.

Punter Pat McAfee was recognized for his league best 44.8 yard punt average, as well as his third successful onside kick of the season, by being named the AFC Special Teams Player of the Week. With the win, the Colts improved to 4–2, winning four straight games, as well as their tenth straight win within the division, dating back to the 2012 season.

==== Week 7: vs. Cincinnati Bengals ====
Week Seven: Cincinnati Bengals at Indianapolis Colts – Game summary

Quarter	1	2	3	4	Total
Bengals	0	0	0	0	0
Colts	3	7	7	10	27

at Lucas Oil Stadium, Indianapolis, Indiana

- Date: October 19
- Game time: 1:00 p.m. EDT
- Game weather: 49 °F (9 °C), partly sunny (retractable roof open)
- Game attendance: 66,539
- Referee: Gene Steratore
- TV announcers (CBS): Ian Eagle (play-by-play), Dan Fouts (color commentator) and Jenny Dell (sideline reporter)
- Recap, Gamebook

Game information

First quarter

- IND – 0:33 Adam Vinatieri 23-yard FG. Drive 10 plays, 68 yards, 4:16. (IND 3–0)

Second quarter

- IND – 12:08 Ahmad Bradshaw 1-yard TD run, Adam Vinatieri kick. Drive 5 plays, 68 yards, 2:45. (IND 10–0)

Third quarter

- IND – 9:47 Dwayne Allen 32-yard TD pass from Andrew Luck, Adam Vinatieri kick. Drive 8 plays, 85 yards, 3:54. (IND 17–0)

Fourth quarter

- IND – 12:09 Ahmad Bradshaw 10-yard TD pass from Andrew Luck, Adam Vinatieri kick. Drive 13 plays, 85 yards, 7:51. (IND 24–0)
- IND – 1:55 Adam Vinatieri 50-yard FG. Drive 11 plays, 63 yards, 6:35. (IND 27–0)

Top passers

- CIN – Andy Dalton: 18/38, 126 yards
- IND – Andrew Luck: 27/42, 344 yards, 2 TD

Top rushers

- CIN – Giovani Bernard: 7 carries, 17 yards
- IND – Trent Richardson: 14 carries, 77 yards

Top receivers

- CIN – Jermaine Gresham: 10 receptions, 48 yards
- IND – T. Y. Hilton: 7 receptions, 107 yards

Top tacklers

- CIN – Vincent Rey: 7 tackles, 9 assists
- IND – D'Qwell Jackson: 3 tackles, 4 assists

The Colts franchise reached its 500th win, counting regular season and playoffs.

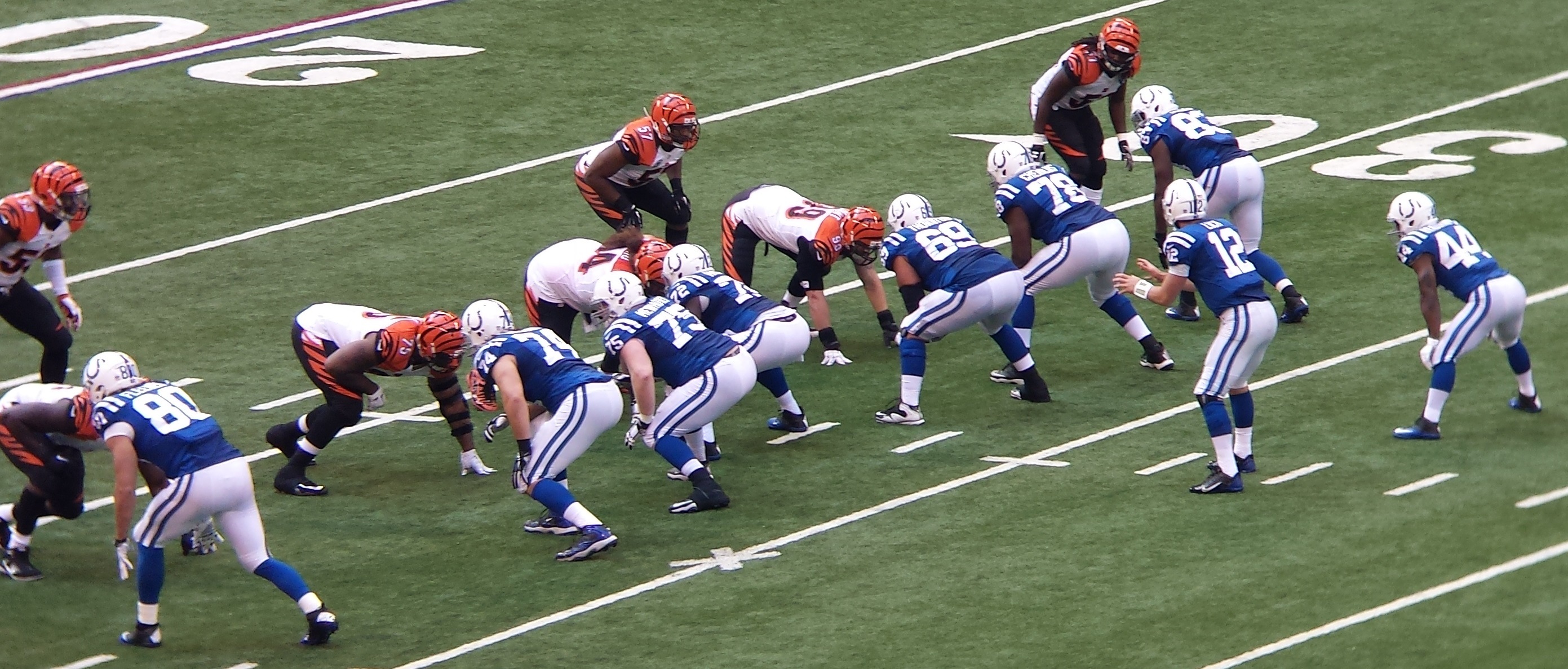
Colts offense playing against the Bengals.

==== Week 8: at Pittsburgh Steelers ====
Week Eight: Indianapolis Colts at Pittsburgh Steelers – Game summary

Quarter	1	2	3	4	Total
Colts	3	17	14	0	34
Steelers	7	28	7	9	51

at Heinz Field, Pittsburgh, Pennsylvania

- Date: October 26
- Game time: 4:25 p.m. EDT
- Game weather: 62 °F (17 °C), sunny
- Game attendance: 62,479
- Referee: John Parry
- TV announcers (CBS): Jim Nantz (play-by-play), Phil Simms (color commentator) and Tracy Wolfson (sideline reporter)
- Recap, Gamebook

Game information

First quarter

- IND – 11:56 Adam Vinatieri 31-yard FG. Drive 7 plays, 67 yards, 3:04. (IND 3–0)
- PIT – 7:13 Markus Wheaton 18-yard TD pass from Ben Roethlisberger, Shaun Suisham kick. Drive 9 plays, 80 yards, 4:43. (PIT 7–3)

Second quarter

- PIT – 14:57 Martavis Bryant 5-yard pass from Ben Roethlisberger, Shaun Suisham kick. Drive 12 plays, 76 yards, 6:29. (PIT 14–3)
- PIT – 14:16 William Gay 33-yard interception return for a TD, Shaun Suisham kick. (PIT 21–3)
- IND – 11:36 Dwayne Allen 21-yard pass from Andrew Luck, Adam Vinatieri kick. Drive 5 plays, 86 yards, 2:40. (PIT 21–10)
- PIT – 8:33 Antonio Brown 8-yard TD pass from Ben Roethlisberger, Shaun Suisham kick. Drive 7 plays, 87 yards, 3:03. (PIT 28–10)
- PIT – 5:08 Antonio Brown 47-yard TD pass from Ben Roethlisberger, Shaun Suisham kick. Drive 4 plays, 77 yards, 2:26. (PIT 35–10)
- IND – 1:56 T. Y. Hilton 28-yard TD pass from Andrew Luck, Adam Vinatieri kick. Drive 8 plays, 80 yards, 3:12. (PIT 35–17)
- IND – 0:00 Adam Vinatieri 23-yard FG. Drive 5 plays, 60 yards, 0:35. (PIT 35–20)

Third quarter

- PIT – 9:59 Martavis Bryant 2-yard TD pass from Ben Roethlisberger, Shaun Suisham kick. Drive 10 plays, 80 yards, 5:01. (PIT 42–20)
- IND – 3:38 Ahmad Bradshaw 12-yard TD run, Adam Vinatieri kick. Drive 8 plays, 69 yards, 3:06. (PIT 42–27)
- IND – 2:25 Donte Moncrief 31-yard TD pass from Andrew Luck, Adam Vinatieri kick. Drive 3 plays, 36 yards, 0:51. (PIT 42–34)

Fourth quarter

- PIT – 12:34 Penalty on Andrew Luck enforced in end zone for a safety. (PIT 44–34)
- PIT – 5:14 Heath Miller 11-yard TD pass from Ben Roethlisberger, Shaun Suisham kick. Drive 12 plays, 67 yards, 7:20. (PIT 51–34)

Top passers

- IND – Andrew Luck: 26/45, 400 yards, 3 TDs, 2 INTs
- PIT – Ben Roethlisberger: 40/49, 522 yards, 6 TDs

Top rushers

- IND – Ahmad Bradshaw: 6 carries, 35 yards, 1 TD
- PIT – Le'Veon Bell: 24 carries, 92 yards

Top receivers

- IND – Donte Moncrief: 7 receptions, 113 yards, 1 TD
- PIT – Antonio Brown: 10 receptions, 133 yards, 2 TDs

Top tacklers

- IND – D'Qwell Jackson: 8 tackles, 5 assists
- PIT – William Gay: 5 tackles, 1 assist, 1 INT, 1 TD

==== Week 9: at New York Giants ====
Week Nine: Indianapolis Colts at New York Giants – Game summary

Quarter	1	2	3	4	Total
Colts	3	13	21	3	40
Giants	0	3	7	14	24

at MetLife Stadium, East Rutherford, New Jersey

- Date: November 3
- Game time: 8:30 p.m. EST
- Game weather: 55 °F (13 °C), mostly clear
- Game attendance: 77,975
- Referee: Carl Cheffers
- TV announcers (ESPN): Mike Tirico (play-by-play), Jon Gruden (color commentator) and Lisa Salters (sideline reporter)
- Recap, Gamebook

Game information

First quarter

- IND – 7:07 Adam Vinatieri 48-yard FG. Drive 11 plays, 58 yards, 5:35. (IND 3–0)

Second quarter

- IND – 13:38 Coby Fleener 32-yard TD pass from Andrew Luck, Adam Vinatieri kick. Drive 2 plays, 68 yards, 1:04. (IND 10–0)
- NYG – 7:07 Josh Brown 38-yard FG. Drive 11 plays, 45 yards, 3:38. (IND 10–3)
- IND – 3:32 Adam Vinatieri 31-yard FG. Drive 9 plays, 61 yards, 3:35. (IND 13–3)
- IND – 1:07 Adam Vinatieri 48-yard FG. Drive 6 plays, 30 yards, 0:53. (IND 16–3)

Third quarter

- IND – 11:50 T. Y. Hilton 31-yard TD pass from Andrew Luck, Adam Vinatieri kick. Drive 8 plays, 84 yards, 3:10. (IND 23–3)
- NYG – 9:48 Andre Williams 1-yard TD run, Josh Brown kick. Drive 5 plays, 84 yards, 2:02. (IND 23–10)
- IND – 6:09 Reggie Wayne 40-yard TD pass from Andrew Luck, Adam Vinatieri kick. Drive 8 plays, 80 yards, 3:39. (IND 30–10)
- IND – 4:31 Dwayne Allen 2-yard TD pass from Andrew Luck, Adam Vinatieri kick. Drive 2 plays, 4 yards, 0:49. (IND 37–10)

Fourth quarter

- IND – 13:23 Adam Vinatieri 43-yard FG. Drive 8 plays, 45 yards, 4:34. (IND 40–10)
- NYG – 8:55 Larry Donnell 5-yard TD pass from Eli Manning, Josh Brown kick. Drive 11 plays, 80 yards, 4:28. (IND 40–17)
- NYG – 3:19 Corey Washington 1-yard TD pass from Eli Manning, Josh Brown kick. Drive 11 plays, 90 yards, 2:52. (IND 40–24)

Top passers

- IND – Andrew Luck: 25/46, 354 yards, 4 TDs
- NYG – Eli Manning: 27/52, 359 yards, 2 TDs

Top rushers

- IND – Ahmad Bradshaw: 7 carries, 50 yards
- NYG – Michael Cox: 2 carries, 27 yards

Top receivers

- IND – Coby Fleener: 4 receptions, 77 yards, 1 TD
- NYG – Odell Beckham Jr.: 8 receptions, 156 yards

Top tacklers

- IND – Mike Adams: 8 tackles, 1 assist
- NYG – Jacquian Williams: 13 tackles, 4 assists

==== Week 11: vs. New England Patriots ====
Week Eleven: New England Patriots at Indianapolis Colts – Game summary

Quarter	1	2	3	4	Total
Patriots	7	7	14	14	42
Colts	3	7	3	7	20

at Lucas Oil Stadium, Indianapolis, Indiana

- Date: November 16
- Game time: 8:30 p.m. EST
- Game weather: Played indoors (retractable roof closed)
- Game attendance: 66,751
- Referee: Pete Morelli
- TV announcers (NBC): Al Michaels (play-by-play), Cris Collinsworth (color commentator) and Michele Tafoya (sideline reporter)
- Recap, Gamebook

Game information

First quarter

Second quarter

Third quarter

Fourth quarter

Top passers

- NE –
- IND –

Top rushers

- NE –
- IND –

Top receivers

- NE –
- IND –

Top tacklers

- NE –
- IND –

==== Week 12: vs. Jacksonville Jaguars ====
Week Twelve: Jacksonville Jaguars at Indianapolis Colts – Game summary

Quarter	1	2	3	4	Total
Jaguars	3	0	0	0	3
Colts	3	3	14	3	23

at Lucas Oil Stadium, Indianapolis, Indiana

- Date: November 23
- Game time: 1:00 p.m. EST
- Game weather: Played indoors (retractable roof closed)
- Game attendance: 64,328
- Referee: Ed Hochuli
- TV announcers (CBS): Tom McCarthy (play-by-play) and Chris Simms (color commentator)
- Recap, Gamebook

Game information

First quarter

Second quarter

Third quarter

Fourth quarter

Top passers

- JAX –
- IND –

Top rushers

- JAX –
- IND –

Top receivers

- JAX –
- IND –

Top tacklers

- JAX –
- IND –

==== Week 13: vs. Washington Redskins ====
Week Thirteen: Washington Redskins at Indianapolis Colts – Game summary

Quarter	1	2	3	4	Total
Redskins	3	7	14	3	27
Colts	7	14	21	7	49

at Lucas Oil Stadium, Indianapolis, Indiana

- Date: November 30
- Game time: 1:00 p.m. EST
- Game weather: Played indoors (retractable roof closed)
- Game attendance: 65,352
- Referee: John Parry
- TV announcers (Fox): Kenny Albert (play-by-play), Daryl Johnston (color commentator) and Tony Siragusa (sideline reporter)
- Recap, Gamebook

Game information

First quarter

- WAS – 13:18 Kai Forbath 25-yard FG. Drive 4 plays, 8 yards, 1:30. (WSH 3–0)
- IND – 6:05 Coby Fleener 30-yard TD pass from Andrew Luck, Adam Vinatieri kick. Drive 7 plays, 83 yards, 4:02. (IND 7–3)

Second quarter

- IND – 12:27 Dan Herron 49-yard TD run, Adam Vinatieri kick. Drive 5 plays, 80 yards, 2:24. (IND 14–3)
- IND – 6:53 T. Y. Hilton 3-yard TD pass from Andrew Luck, Adam Vinatieri kick. Drive 9 plays, 68 yards, 4:00. (IND 21–3)
- WAS – 1:59 Roy Helu 21-yard TD pass from Colt McCoy, Kai Forbath kick. Drive 9 plays, 84 yards, 4:54. (IND 21–10)

Third quarter

- WAS – 11:22 Logan Paulsen 16-yard TD pass from Colt McCoy, Kai Forbath kick. Drive 8 plays, 80 yards, 3:38. (IND 21–17)
- IND – 10:05 Donte Moncrief 48-yard TD pass from Andrew Luck, Adam Vinatieri kick. Drive 3 plays, 56 yards, 1:17. (IND 28–17)
- IND – 7:30 D'Qwell Jackson 35-yard fumble recovery for a TD, Adam Vinatieri kick. (IND 35–17)
- WAS – 5:12 DeSean Jackson 42-yard TD pass from Colt McCoy, Kai Forbath kick. Drive 6 plays, 80 yards, 2:18. (IND 35–24)
- IND – 4:45 Coby Fleener 73-yard TD pass from Andrew Luck, Adam Vinatieri kick. Drive 2 plays, 73 yards, 0:27. (IND 42–24)

Fourth quarter

- WAS – 12:00 Kai Forbath 29-yard FG. Drive 6 plays, 37 yards, 1:45. (IND 42–27)
- IND – 10:34 Donte Moncrief 79-yard TD pass from Andrew Luck, Adam Vinatieri kick. Drive 3 plays, 80 yards, 1:26. (IND 49–27)

Top passers

- WAS – Colt McCoy: 31/47, 392 yards, 3 TD
- IND – Andrew Luck: 19/27, 370 yards, 5 TD, 1 INT

Top rushers

- WAS – Alfred Morris: 17 carries, 67 yards
- IND – Dan Herron: 8 carries, 88 yards, 1 TD

Top receivers

- WAS – Jordan Reed: 9 receptions, 123 yards
- IND – Donte Moncrief: 3 receptions, 134 yards, 2 TD

Top tacklers

- WAS – Ryan Kerrigan: 5 tackles, 1 sack, 1 forced fumble
- IND – Jerrell Freeman: 6 tackles, 4 assists, 1 sack

==== Week 14: at Cleveland Browns ====
Week Fourteen: Indianapolis Colts at Cleveland Browns – Game summary

Quarter	1	2	3	4	Total
Colts	0	7	9	9	25
Browns	7	7	7	3	24

at FirstEnergy Stadium, Cleveland, Ohio

- Date: December 7
- Game time: 1:00 p.m. EST
- Game weather: 37 °F (3 °C), sunny
- Game attendance: 67,431
- Referee: Clete Blakeman
- TV announcers (Fox): Kevin Burkhardt (play-by-play), John Lynch (color commentator) and Pam Oliver (sideline reporter)
- Recap, Gamebook

Game information

First quarter

- CLE – 0:40 Craig Robertson fumble recovery in end zone for a touchdown. (CLE 7–0)

Second quarter

- IND – 5:57 Andrew Luck 11-yard TD run, Adam Vinatieri kick. Drive 6 plays, 70 yards, 2:53. (7–7)
- CLE – 1:14 Isaiah Crowell 9-yard TD run, Billy Cundiff kick. Drive 9 plays, 77 yards, 4:43. (CLE 14–7)

Third quarter

- CLE – 10:21 Justin Gilbert 23-yard interception return for a TD, Billy Cundiff kick. (CLE 21–7)
- IND – 7:16 Adam Vinatieri 51-yard FG. Drive 7 plays, 31 yards, 3:05. (CLE 21–10)
- IND – 4:01 T. Y. Hilton 41-yard TD pass from Andrew Luck, 2-point conversion failed. Drive 6 plays, 54 yards, 1:39. (CLE 21–16)

Fourth quarter

- IND – 14:50 Adam Vinatieri 33-yard FG. Drive 8 plays, 37 yards, 2:32. (CLE 21–19)
- CLE – 8:34 Billy Cundiff 39-yard FG. Drive 4 plays, 2 yards, 1:34. (CLE 24–19)
- IND – 0:32 T. Y. Hilton 1-yard TD pass from Andrew Luck, 2-point conversion failed. Drive 11 plays, 90 yards, 3:14. (IND 25–24)

Top passers

- IND – Andrew Luck: 24/53, 294 yards, 2 TD, 1 Rush TD, 1 INT
- CLE – Brian Hoyer: 14/31, 140 yards, 2 INT

Top rushers

- IND – Andrew Luck: 5 attempts, 36 yards, TD
- CLE – Terrance West: 15 attempts, 54 yards

Top receivers

- IND – T. Y. Hilton: 10 receptions, 150 yards, 2 TD
- CLE – Jordan Cameron: 4 receptions, 41 yards

Top tacklers

- IND – Jerrell Freeman: 7 tackles, 2 assists
- CLE – Craig Robertson: 10 tackles, 2 assists, 1 fumble recovery, 1 TD

==== Week 15: vs. Houston Texans ====
Week Fifteen: Houston Texans at Indianapolis Colts – Game summary

Quarter	1	2	3	4	Total
Texans	7	0	0	3	10
Colts	0	14	0	3	17

at Lucas Oil Stadium, Indianapolis, Indiana

- Date: December 14
- Game time: 1:00 p.m. EST
- Game weather: Played indoors (retractable roof closed)
- Game attendance: 65,148
- Referee: Gene Steratore
- TV announcers (CBS): Kevin Harlan (play-by-play) and Rich Gannon (color commentator)
- Recap, Gamebook

Game information

First quarter

- HOU – 5:56 Kendrick Lewis 27-yard interception return for a TD, Randy Bullock kick. (HOU 7–0)

Second quarter

- IND – 14:53 Hakeem Nicks 26-yard TD pass from Andrew Luck, Adam Vinatieri kick. Drive 6 plays, 78 yards, 2:54. (7–7)
- IND – 6:21 Dwayne Allen 3-yard TD pass from Andrew Luck, Adam Vinatieri kick. Drive 3 plays, 37 yards, 1:24. (IND 14–7)

Third quarter

- No scoring plays

Fourth quarter

- HOU – Randy Bullock 53-yard FG. Drive 10 plays, 54 yards, 5:30. (IND 14–10)
- IND – Adam Vinatieri 29-yard FG. Drive 10 plays, 47 yards, 5:03. (IND 17–10)

Top passers

- HOU – Tom Savage: 10/19, 127 yards, 1 INT
- IND – Andrew Luck: 18/34, 187 yards, 2 TDs, 1 INT

Top rushers

- HOU – Arian Foster: 26 carries, 99 yards
- IND – Dan Herron: 11 carries, 60 yards

Top receivers

- HOU – DeAndre Hopkins: 5 receptions, 77 yards
- IND – T. Y. Hilton: 4 receptions, 50 yards

Top tacklers

- HOU – Mike Mohamed: 3 tackles, 4 assists
- IND – D'Qwell Jackson: 6 tackles, 4 assists

With the win, the Colts clinched the AFC South title for a second consecutive season.

==== Week 16: at Dallas Cowboys ====
Week Sixteen: Indianapolis Colts at Dallas Cowboys – Game summary

Quarter	1	2	3	4	Total
Colts	0	0	0	7	7
Cowboys	14	14	7	7	42

at AT&T Stadium, Arlington, Texas

- Date: December 21
- Game time: 4:25 p.m. EST/3:25 p.m. CST
- Game weather: Played indoors (retractable roof closed)
- Game attendance: 91,899
- Referee: Bill Leavy
- TV announcers (CBS): Jim Nantz (play-by-play), Phil Simms (color commentator) and Tracy Wolfson (sideline reporter)
- Recap, Gamebook

Game information

First quarter

Second quarter

Third quarter

Fourth quarter

Top passers

- IND –
- DAL –

Top rushers

- IND –
- DAL –

Top receivers

- IND –
- DAL –

Top tacklers

- IND –
- DAL –

==== Week 17: at Tennessee Titans ====
Week Seventeen: Indianapolis Colts at Tennessee Titans – Game summary

Quarter	1	2	3	4	Total
Colts	7	10	0	10	27
Titans	0	7	3	0	10

at LP Field, Nashville, Tennessee

- Date: December 28
- Game time: 1:00 p.m. EST/12:00 p.m. CST
- Game weather: 40 °F (4 °C), cloudy
- Game attendance: 69,143
- Referee: Tony Corrente
- TV announcers (CBS): Tom McCarthy (play-by-play) and Adam Archuleta (color commentator)
- Recap, Gamebook

Game information

First quarter

Second quarter

Third quarter

Fourth quarter

Top passers

- IND –
- TEN –

Top rushers

- IND –
- TEN –

Top receivers

- IND –
- TEN –

Top tacklers

- IND –
- TEN –

With the win, the Colts finished the season 11–5 for the third straight year, good enough for the AFC's #4 seed. This would be their 13th straight win over a division rival as they improved to 16–2 against divisional opponents overall under Andrew Luck.

=== Postseason ===
==== AFC Wild Card Playoffs: vs. #5 Cincinnati Bengals ====
AFC Wild Card Playoffs: (#5) Cincinnati Bengals at (#4) Indianapolis Colts – Game summary

Quarter	1	2	3	4	Total
Bengals	7	3	0	0	10
Colts	7	6	10	3	26

at Lucas Oil Stadium, Indianapolis, Indiana

- Date: January 4, 2015
- Game time: 1:05 p.m. EST
- Game weather: Played indoors (retractable roof closed)
- Game attendance: 63,385
- Referee: Carl Cheffers
- TV announcers (CBS): Jim Nantz (play-by-play), Phil Simms (color commentator) and Tracy Wolfson (sideline reporter)
- Recap, Game book

Game information

First quarter

- IND – 11:05 Dan Herron 2-yard TD run, Adam Vinatieri kick. Drive 9 plays, 71 yards, 3:55. (IND 7–7)
- CIN – 1:28 Jeremy Hill 1-yard TD run, Mike Nugent kick. Drive 9 plays, 74 yards, 4:26. (7–7)

Second quarter

- IND – 12:41 Adam Vinatieri 38-yard FG. Drive 11 plays, 71 yards, 3:47. (IND 10–7)
- IND – 8:34 Adam Vinatieri 29-yard FG. Drive 6 plays, 53 yards, 2:17. (IND 13–7)
- CIN – 0:10 Mike Nugent 57-yard FG. Drive 7 plays, 20 yards, 1:39. (IND 13–10)

Third quarter

- IND – 7:48 Donte Moncrief 36-yard TD pass from Andrew Luck, Adam Vinatieri kick. Drive 6 plays, 61 yards, 2:06. (IND 20–10)
- IND – 1:31 Adam Vinatieri 22-yard FG. Drive 10 plays, 53 yards, 4:47. (IND 23–10)

Fourth quarter

- IND – 11:31 Adam Vinatieri 53-yard FG. Drive 6 plays, 12 yards, 3:28. (IND 26–10)

Top passers

- CIN – Andy Dalton: 18/35, 155 yards, 1 fumble lost
- IND – Andrew Luck: 31/44, 376 yards, 1 TD

Top rushers

- CIN – Jeremy Hill: 13 carries, 47 yards, 1 TD
- IND – Dan Herron: 12 carries, 56 yards, 1 TD, 1 fumble lost

Top receivers

- CIN – Giovani Bernard: 8 receptions, 46 yards
- IND – T. Y. Hilton: 6 receptions, 103 yards

Top tacklers

- CIN – Vincent Rey: 5 tackles, 6 assists, 1 forced fumble
- IND – Jerrell Freeman: 7 tackles, 8 assists, 1.5 sacks, 1 forced fumble

==== AFC Divisional Playoffs: at #2 Denver Broncos ====
AFC Divisional Playoffs: (#4) Indianapolis Colts at (#2) Denver Broncos – Game summary

Quarter	1	2	3	4	Total
Colts	0	14	7	3	24
Broncos	7	3	0	3	13

at Sports Authority Field at Mile High, Denver, Colorado

- Date: January 11, 2015
- Game time: 4:40 p.m. EST/2:40 p.m. MST
- Game weather: 40 °F (4 °C), cloudy
- Game attendance: 76,867
- Referee: Bill Leavy
- TV announcers (CBS): Jim Nantz (play-by-play), Phil Simms (color commentator) and Tracy Wolfson (sideline reporter)
- Recap, Game book

Game information

First quarter

- DEN – 10:00 Demaryius Thomas 1-yard TD reception from Peyton Manning, Connor Barth kick. Drive 7 plays, 68 yards, 3:37. (DEN 7–0)

Second quarter

- IND – 14:14 Dan Herron 6-yard TD run, Adam Vinatieri kick. Drive 9 plays, 73 yards, 5:05. (7–7)
- IND – 7:23 Dwayne Allen 3-yard TD pass from Andrew Luck, Adam Vinatieri kick. Drive 8 plays, 41 yards, 3:41. (IND 14–7)
- DEN – 0:02 Connor Barth 45-yard FG. Drive 7 plays, 25 yards, 1:26. (IND 14–10)

Third quarter

- IND – 8:21 Hakeem Nicks 15-yard TD pass from Andrew Luck, Adam Vinatieri kick. Drive 11 plays, 72 yards, 5:16. (IND 21–10)

Fourth quarter

- DEN – 13:50 Connor Barth 41-yard FG. Drive 14 plays, 53 yards, 6:23. (IND 21–13)
- IND – 4:06 Adam Vinatieri 30-yard FG. Drive 13 plays, 54 yards, 8:09. (IND 24–13)

Top passers

- IND – Andrew Luck: 27/43, 265 yards, 2 TD, 2 INT
- DEN – Peyton Manning: 26/46, 211 yards, 1 TD

Top rushers

- IND – Dan Herron: 23 carries, 63 yards, 1 TD
- DEN – C. J. Anderson: 18 carries, 80 yards

Top receivers

- IND – T. Y. Hilton: 4 receptions, 72 yards
- DEN – Demaryius Thomas: 5 receptions, 59 yards, 1 TD

Top tacklers

- IND – D'Qwell Jackson: 10 tackles, 1 assist
- DEN – Steven Johnson: 5 tackles, 1 assist

==== AFC Championship: at #1 New England Patriots ====
AFC Championship: (#4) Indianapolis Colts at (#1) New England Patriots – Game summary

Quarter	1	2	3	4	Total
Colts	0	7	0	0	7
Patriots	14	3	21	7	45

at Gillette Stadium, Foxborough, Massachusetts

- Date: January 18, 2015
- Game time: 6:40 p.m. EST
- Game weather: 51 °F (11 °C), rain
- Game attendance: 68,756
- Referee: Walt Anderson
- TV announcers (CBS): Jim Nantz (play-by-play), Phil Simms (color commentator) and Tracy Wolfson (sideline reporter)
- Recap, Gamebook

Game information

First quarter

Second quarter

Third quarter

Fourth quarter

Top passers

- IND –
- NE –

Top rushers

- IND –
- NE –

Top receivers

- IND –
- NE –

Top tacklers

- IND –
- NE –

== Standings ==
=== Division ===
AFC South
	W	L	T	PCT	DIV	CONF	PF	PA	STK
^{(4)} Indianapolis Colts	11	5	0	.688	6–0	9–3	458	369	W1
Houston Texans	9	7	0	.563	4–2	8–4	372	307	W2
Jacksonville Jaguars	3	13	0	.188	1–5	2–10	249	412	L1
Tennessee Titans	2	14	0	.125	1–5	2–10	254	438	L10

=== Conference ===
AFC
#	Team	Division	W	L	T	PCT	DIV	CONF	SOS	SOV	STK
Division leaders
1 (Note: New England defeated Denver head-to-head (Week 9, 43–21).)	New England Patriots	East	12	4	0	.750	4–2	9–3	.514	.487	L1
2	Denver Broncos	West	12	4	0	.750	6–0	10–2	.521	.484	W1
3 (Note: Pittsburgh defeated Indianapolis head-to-head (Week 8, 51–34).)	Pittsburgh Steelers	North	11	5	0	.688	4–2	9–3	.451	.486	W4
4	Indianapolis Colts	South	11	5	0	.688	6–0	9–3	.479	.372	W1
Wild Cards
5	Cincinnati Bengals	North	10	5	1	.656	3–3	7–5	.498	.425	L1
6	Baltimore Ravens	North	10	6	0	.625	3–3	6–6	.475	.378	W1
Did not qualify for the postseason
7 (Note: Kansas City finished ahead of San Diego in the AFC West based on head-to-head sweep (Week 7, 23–20; Week 17, 19–7). Houston finished ahead of Kansas City and Buffalo based on conference record. Kansas City finished ahead of Buffalo based on head-to-head victory (Week 10, 17–13). San Diego finished ahead of Buffalo based on head-to-head victory (Week 3, 22–10).)	Houston Texans	South	9	7	0	.563	4–2	8–4	.447	.299	W2
8	Kansas City Chiefs	West	9	7	0	.563	3–3	7–5	.512	.500	W1
9	San Diego Chargers	West	9	7	0	.563	2–4	6–6	.512	.403	L1
10	Buffalo Bills	East	9	7	0	.563	4–2	5–7	.516	.486	W1
11	Miami Dolphins	East	8	8	0	.500	3–3	6–6	.512	.406	L1
12	Cleveland Browns	North	7	9	0	.438	2–4	4–8	.479	.371	L5
13	New York Jets	East	4	12	0	.250	1–5	4–8	.543	.375	W1
14 (Note: Jacksonville finished ahead of Oakland based on record vs. common opponents (1–4 to 0–5).)	Jacksonville Jaguars	South	3	13	0	.188	1–5	2–10	.514	.313	L1
15	Oakland Raiders	West	3	13	0	.188	1–5	2–10	.570	.542	L1
16	Tennessee Titans	South	2	14	0	.125	1–5	2–10	.506	.375	L10
Tiebreakers (Note: When breaking ties for three or more teams under the NFL's rules, they are first broken within divisions, then comparing only the highest ranked remaining team from each division.)
