= Mike Adams (safety) =

American football player and coach (born 1981)

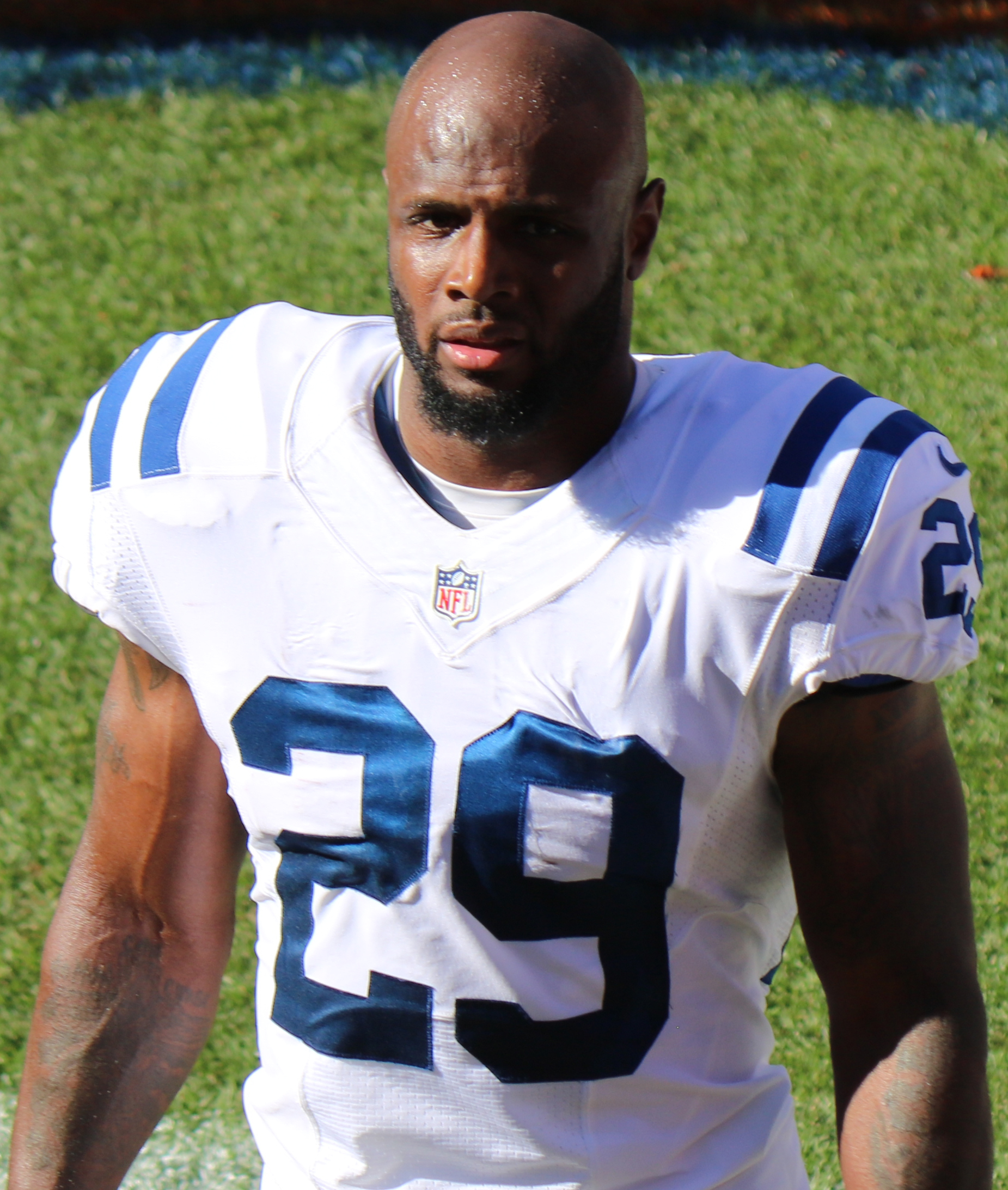
- Adams with the Indianapolis Colts in 2016

Personal information
- Born: March 24, 1981 (age 45); Paterson, New Jersey, U.S.
- Listed height: 5 ft 11 in (1.80 m)
- Listed weight: 200 lb (91 kg)

Career information
- Position: Safety (No. 20, 29, 27)
- High school: Passaic County Technical Institute (Wayne, New Jersey)
- College: Delaware (1999–2003)
- NFL draft: 2004: undrafted

Career history

Playing
- San Francisco 49ers (2004–2006); Cleveland Browns (2007–2011); Denver Broncos (2012–2013); Indianapolis Colts (2014–2016); Carolina Panthers (2017–2018); Houston Texans (2019)

Coaching
- Chicago Bears (2021) Assistant defensive backs coach; New York Giants (2023) Assistant special teams coach; New York Giants (2024–2025) Assistant secondary coach

Awards and highlights
- 2× Pro Bowl (2014, 2015); Second-team All-Atlantic 10 (2003)

Career NFL statistics
- Total tackles: 930
- Sacks: 6.0
- Forced fumbles: 13
- Fumble recoveries: 16
- Pass deflections: 83
- Interceptions: 30
- Defensive touchdowns: 2
- Stats at Pro Football Reference

Michael Carl Adams (born March 24, 1981) is an American former professional football player who was a safety in the National Football League (NFL). He is currently the assistant secondary coach for the New York Giants. Adams played college football for the Delaware Fightin' Blue Hens, and was signed by the San Francisco 49ers as an undrafted free agent in 2004. Adams also played for the Cleveland Browns, Denver Broncos, Indianapolis Colts, Carolina Panthers, and Houston Texans, and made two Pro Bowls during his 16-year career.

== Early life ==
Adams was born in Paterson, New Jersey. A native of Wayne, New Jersey, Adams attended PCTI in Wayne, where he helped guide his team to the New Jersey Group 4 state title in 1998. Adams attended Passaic County Technical Institute in Wayne, New Jersey before going on to the University of Delaware.

== College career ==
At Delaware, he played 43 times with 23 starts. During his college career he made 213 tackles and 11 interceptions. He earned second-team All-Atlantic 10 honors as a senior. He was undrafted in the 2004 NFL draft.

== Professional career ==
=== San Francisco 49ers ===
==== 2004 ====
On April 28, 2004, the San Francisco 49ers signed Adams to a three-year, $879,885 contract as an undrafted free agent.

Throughout training camp, he competed for a roster spot as a backup safety, cornerback, and special teams player against fellow rookie Keith Lewis. On September 4, 2004, the San Francisco 49ers waived Adams as part of their final roster cuts, but signed him to their practice squad two days later after he cleared waivers.

On November 13, 2004, the San Francisco 49ers elevated Adams to their active roster. Head coach Dennis Erickson named Adams a backup free safety behind Ronnie Heard. On November 14, 2004, Adams made his professional regular season debut in their 49ers' 37–27 loss in Week 10. On November 28, 2004, Adams recorded a season-high three combined tackles, a pass deflection, and made his first career interception off a pass by quarterback A. J. Feeley during a 24–17 loss to the Miami Dolphins in Week 12. He finished his rookie season in 2004 with nine combined tackles (four solo), a pass deflection, and an interception in eight games and zero starts.

==== 2005 ====
On January 6, 2005, the San Francisco 49ers fired head coach Dennis Erickson after they finished with a 2–14 record. Defensive coordinator Billy Davis held an open competition to name a starting free safety. Adams competed for the role against Ronnie Heard, Keith Lewis, and Mike Rumph, while also seeing time at cornerback. Head coach Mike Nolan named Adams the third-string free safety to start the regular season, behind Mike Rumph and Keith Lewis. He was also named the first-team nickelback to begin the regular season.

He appeared in the San Francisco 49ers' season-opener against the St. Louis Rams and recorded four solo tackles, two pass deflections, an interception, and made his first career sack on quarterback Marc Bulger in their 28–25 victory. On September 27, 2005, head coach Mike Nolan announced he'd be moving Adams from nickelback to starting free safety after Rumph sustained a foot injury. On October 2, 2005, Adams earned his first career start and recorded three solo tackles during a 31–14 victory against the Arizona Cardinals in Week 4. The following week, he collected a season-high nine combined tackles and a pass deflection during a 28–3 loss to the Indianapolis Colts in Week 5. Adams was sidelined for two games (Weeks 14–15) after spraining his knee in Week 13. On January 1, 2006, Adams recorded six combined tackles, three pass deflections, and intercepted two pass attempts by David Carr during a 20–17 victory against the Houston Texans in Week 17. Adams completed the 2005 season with 74 combined tackles (57 solo), five pass deflections, four interceptions, and a sack in 14 games and ten starts.

==== 2006 ====
Throughout training camp, Adams competed to retain his role as the starting free safety against Keith Lewis and Tony Parrish. Head coach Mike Nolan named Adams the starting free safety to begin the regular season, opposite strong safety Tony Parrish.

He started in the San Francisco 49ers' season-opener at the Arizona Cardinals and collected a season-high eight combined tackles in their 34–27 loss. In Week 8, he tied his season-high of eight combined tackles during a 41–10 loss at the Chicago Bears. In Week 9, Adams was demoted to being a backup behind Keith Lewis and was also relegated to being a nickelback. He finished the season with 64 combined tackles (54 solo) and three pass deflections in 16 games and eight starts.

=== Cleveland Browns ===
==== 2007 ====
On April 2, 2007, the Cleveland Browns signed Adams to a two-year, $1.21 million contract. During training camp, Adams competed to be a backup safety against Gary Baxter, Justin Hamilton, and Nick Sorensen. Head coach Romeo Crennel named Adams the backup free safety, behind Brodney Pool, to begin the regular season. In Week 11, Adams had one tackle and made his second career sack on quarterback Kyle Boller during a 33–30 victory at the Baltimore Ravens. On December 2, 2007, he collected a season-high five solo tackles in the Browns' 27–21 loss at the Arizona Cardinals in Week 13. Adams was limited to a backup role and did not receive any starts in 2007, but managed to finish the season with 29 combined tackles (27 solo), a pass deflection, and a sack in 16 games.

==== 2008 ====
He entered training camp in 2008 and competed for a roster spot as a backup safety against Gary Baxter, Nick Sorensen, and Steve Cargile. Head coach Romeo Crennel retained Adams as the backup free safety behind Brodney Pool to start the 2008 regular season.

He started in the Cleveland Browns' season-opener against the Dallas Cowboys and recorded eight solo tackles in their 28–10 loss. Adams earned the start after Brodney Pool was inactive due to a concussion he suffered during the preseason. The following week, he started in place of Sean Jones who was inactive for the next four games (Weeks 2–6) after undergoing arthroscopic knee surgery. In Week 3, Adams made his second start at strong safety in place of Jones and recorded four combined tackles, a pass deflection, and an interception during a 28–10 loss at the Baltimore Ravens. On October 13, 2008, he collected a season-high five solo tackles in the Browns' 35–14 win against the New York Giants in Week 6. Adams sustained a hamstring injury and was sidelined for two games (Weeks 7–8). He finished the 2008 season with 44 combined tackles (36 solo), two pass deflections, and two interceptions in 14 games and five starts. On December 29, 2008, the Cleveland Browns fired head coach Romeo Crennel after they finished the season with a 4–12 record.

==== 2009 ====
On March 5, 2009, the Cleveland Browns signed Adams to a three-year, $4.10 million contract. Throughout training camp, Adams competed for the starting strong safety job against Abram Elam after Sean Jones departed for the Philadelphia Eagles during free agency. Head coach Eric Mangini named Adams the primary backup safety to start the regular season, behind starters Abram Elam and Brodney Pool. On November 29, 2009, Adams recorded a season-high ten combined tackles (six solo) during a 16–7 loss at the Cincinnati Bengals in Week 12. He came in during the second quarter after Brodney Pool sustained a concussion. On December 2, 2009, head coach Eric Mangini named Adams the starting free safety for the remainder of the season due to expectations that Pool would miss the rest of the season after sustaining a concussion. He completed the 2009 season with 69 combined tackles (58 solo), eight pass deflections, and a sack in 16 games and nine starts.

==== 2010 ====
In 2010, Adams competed for the job as the starting free safety against Abram Elam and Ray Ventrone during training camp. Head coach Eric Mangini named Adams the backup free safety to start the season, behind Abram Elam. He started in the Cleveland Browns' at the Tampa Bay Buccaneers and collected seven combined tackles, made a season-high three pass deflections, and an interception in their 17–14 loss. Adams was inactive for the Browns' Week 11 loss at the Jacksonville Jaguars due to an abdomen injury. On December 5, 2010, Adams recorded three combined tackles, a pass deflection, and an interception in the Browns' 13–10 victory at the Miami Dolphins in Week 13. He intercepted a pass by quarterback Chad Henne that was deflected by Browns defensive lineman David Bowens and returned it 25-yards to the two-yard line. His interception set up a 23-yard game-winning field goal by Phil Dawson as time expired in the fourth quarter. He finished the season with 45 combined tackles (39 solo), six pass deflections, two interceptions, and a sack in 15 games and two starts.

==== 2011 ====
On January 4, 2011, the Cleveland Browns fired head coach Eric Mangini after the Browns finished with a 5–11 record in 2010. During training camp, Adams competed to be the starting free safety against Usama Young. Head coach Pat Shurmur named Adams the starter to begin the regular season, along with strong safety T. J. Ward. In Week 4, he made two solo tackles, a pass deflection, and intercepted a pass by Jake Locker during a 31–13 loss to the Tennessee Titans. It marked his second consecutive game with an interception. On December 8, 2011, Adams collected a season-high ten combined tackles (six solo), broke up a pass, and intercepted a pass by Ben Roethlisberger in the Browns' 14–3 loss at the Pittsburgh Steelers in Week 14. He completed the 2011 season with 64 combined tackles (44 solo), six pass deflections, and three interceptions in 16 games and 16 starts.

==== 2012 ====
Adams became an unrestricted free agent after the 2011 season and did not receive a contract offer from the Browns although he expressed a desire to return. He reportedly received interest from four teams, including the Denver Broncos.

=== Denver Broncos ===
On March 15, 2012, the Denver Broncos signed Adams to a two-year, $4 million contract with $250,000 guaranteed. During training camp, he competed to be a starting safety against Rahim Moore, Duke Ihenacho, and Quinton Carter. Head coach John Fox named Adams the starting strong safety to start the regular season, alongside free safety Rahim Moore.

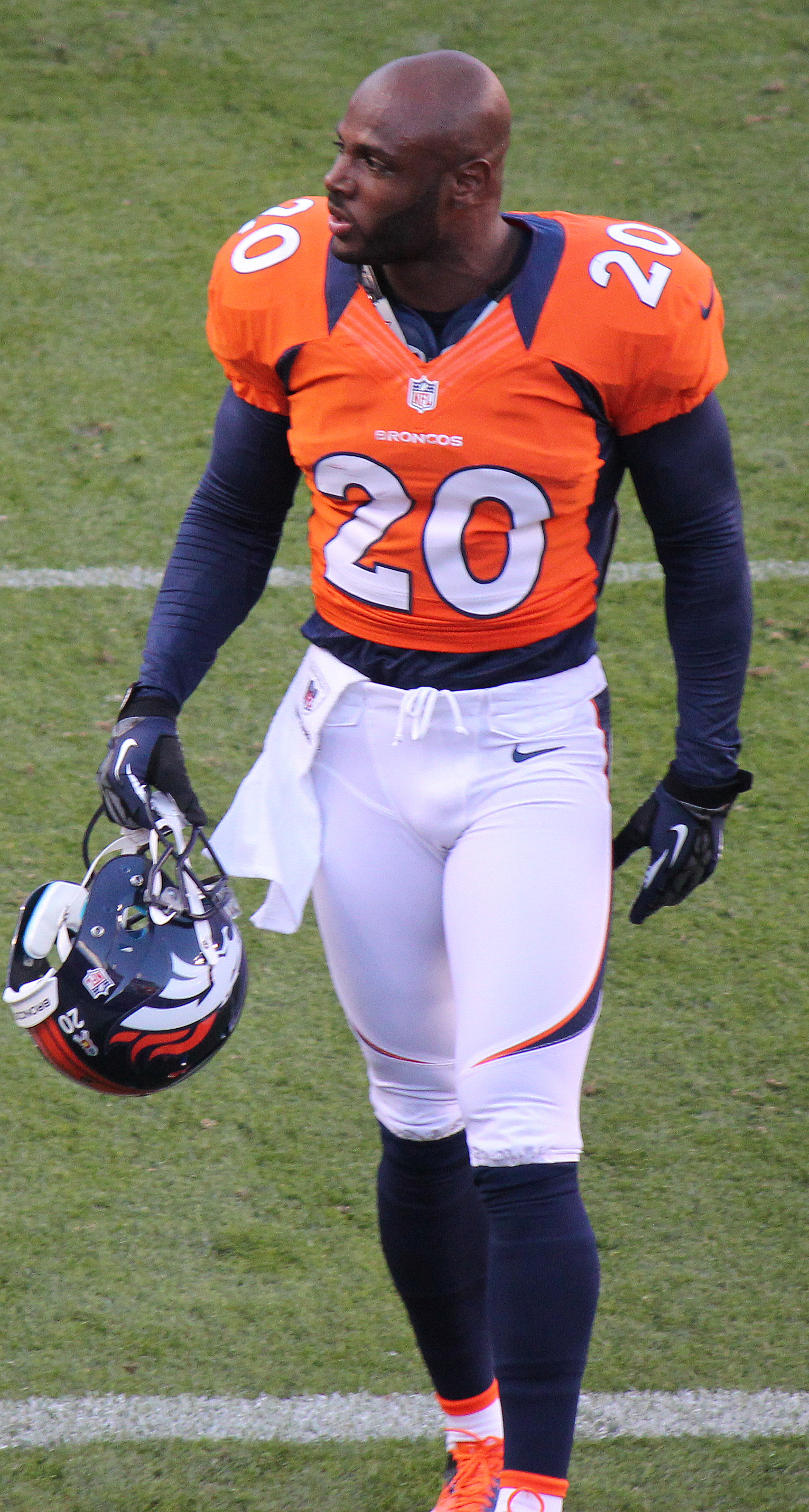
Adams with the Broncos in 2012.

In Week 3, Adams collected six combined tackles and a season-high three pass deflections during a 31–25 loss to the Houston Texans. On October 7, 2012, he collected a season-high 12 combined tackles (six solo) during a 31–21 loss at the New England Patriots in Week 5. On November 11, 2012, Adams recorded four combined tackles and sacked quarterback Cam Newton for a safety in the Broncos' 36–14 victory at the Carolina Panthers in Week 10. His safety came on a two-yard sack in the fourth quarter and marked the first safety of his career. Adams completed the 2012 season with 80 combined tackles (60 solo), 11 pass deflections, a sack, and a safety in 16 games and 16 starts.

The Denver Broncos finished first in the AFC West with a 13–3 record and earned a first round bye. On January 12, 2013, Adams started in his first career playoff game and made two solo tackles and a pass deflection in the Broncos' 38–35 overtime loss to the Baltimore Ravens in the AFC Divisional Game.

==== 2013 ====
Throughout training camp, Adams competed to retain his starting strong safety role against David Bruton, Duke Ihenacho, and Quentin Jammer. Head coach John Fox named Adams the backup strong safety to start the season, behind Duke Ihenacho.

In Week 10, Adams earned his first start of the season after Duke Ihenacho was inactive after injuring his ankle the previous week. Adams finished the Broncos' 28–20 victory at the San Diego Chargers with four combined tackles. On December 24, 2013, Adams started at free safety and made eight combined tackles during a 34–31 loss at the New England Patriots in Week 12. He started in place of Rahim Moore who underwent surgery to repair a lateral compartment syndrome and missed the remainder of the regular season. He finished the 2013 season with 64 combined tackles (48 solo), six pass deflections, and an interception in 16 games and seven starts.

The Denver Broncos finished first in the AFC West with a 13–3 record, clinching a first round bye and home-field advantage throughout the playoffs. The Broncos reached Super Bowl XLVIII after they defeated the San Diego Chargers 24–17 in the AFC Divisional Round and defeating the New England Patriots 26–16 in the AFC Championship Game. Before the start of Super Bowl XLVIII, Adams vowed to walk about 12 miles (19 km) from MetLife Stadium back to his childhood home if the Broncos were victorious. On February 2, 2014, Adams recorded six solo tackles as the Broncos lost to the Seattle Seahawks 43–8.

==== 2014 ====
Adams became an unrestricted free agent after the 2013 season and received interest from several teams, including the San Francisco 49ers, New York Jets, Cleveland Browns, and New England Patriots.

=== Indianapolis Colts ===
On June 14, 2014, the Indianapolis Colts signed Adams to a one-year, $1.01 million contract that includes $65,000 guaranteed. The Colts signed Adams after safety Corey Lynch was placed on season-ending injured reserve.

Throughout training camp, he competed for a job as the starting strong safety against Delano Howell, David Sims, Colt Anderson, and Sergio Brown. Head coach Chuck Pagano named him the starting strong safety to begin the regular season, alongside free safety Sergio Brown. On September 28, 2014, Adams made a season-high three pass deflections and made two interceptions by Charlie Whitehurst and Zach Mettenberger during a 41–17 victory against the Tennessee Titans in Week 4. In Week 8, he recorded a season-high 11 combined tackles (eight solo) during a 51–34 loss at the Pittsburgh Steelers. On November 16, 2014, Adams tied his season-high of 11 combined tackles (eight solo), deflected two passes, and intercepted quarterback Tom Brady twice during the Colts' 42–20 loss to the New England Patriots in Week 11. On December 23, 2014, Adams was named as an alternate player for the 2014 Pro Bowl. Adams completed the 2014 season with a career-high 87 combined tackles (67 solo), 11 pass deflections, and five interceptions in 16 games and 16 starts.

The Indianapolis Colts finished first in the AFC South with an 11–5 record. On January 7, 2015, Adams started in the AFC Wildcard Game and collected nine combined tackles (seven solo) and a pass deflection during the Colts' 26–10 win against the Cincinnati Bengals. The following week, he made two combined tackles as the Colts defeated his former team, Denver Broncos, 24–13 in the AFC Divisional Round. On January 18, 2015, Adams recorded nine combined tackles during a 45–7 loss at the New England Patriots in the AFC Championship Game. On January 20, 2015, it was announced that Adams would be playing in the 2015 Pro Bowl as a replacement for Kam Chancellor, who was unable to attend due to his participation in Super Bowl XLIX.

==== 2015 ====
On March 10, 2015, the Indianapolis Colts re-signed Adams to a two-year, $4.85 million contract with $1.20 million guaranteed. Head coach Chuck Pagano named Adams the starting strong safety to start the regular season, opposite free safety Dwight Lowery.

On October 8, 2015, Adams recorded four combined tackles, two pass deflections, and intercepted two passes by Brian Hoyer and Ryan Mallett during a 27–20 win at the Houston Texans in Week 5. The following week, Adams recorded three combined tackles, broke up a pass, and returned an interception for touchdown in the Colts' 34–27 loss to the New England Patriots in Week 6. He intercepted a pass to Julian Edelman that was thrown by Tom Brady and returned it for a 14-yard touchdown in the second quarter. The touchdown was his second score of his career and first one since 2005. He was inactive for the Colts' Week 7 loss to the New Orleans Saints after injuring his hamstring the previous week. In Week 9, Adams made one tackle, a pass deflection, and an interception, but exited the Colts' 27–25 win against the Denver Broncos in the third quarter after injuring his ankle. His ankle injury sidelined him for the next to games (Weeks 11–12). On December 6, 2015, Adams collected a season-high 12 combined tackles (11 solo) in the Colts' 35–10 loss at the Pittsburgh Steelers in Week 13. The following week, he recorded four solo tackles and sacked quarterback Blake Bortles during a 51–16 loss at the Jacksonville Jaguars in Week 14. He finished the 2015 season with 75 combined tackles (52 solo), six pass deflections, a career-high five interceptions, and a sack in 13 games and 13 starts. On January 25, 2016, it was announced that Adams was selected as a replacement for the injured Kam Chancellor in the 2016 Pro Bowl.

==== 2016 ====
On January 6, 2016, the Indianapolis Colts fired defensive coordinator Greg Manusky and safeties coach Roy Anderson after they finished 8–8 behind a struggling defense. Defensive coordinator Ted Monachino retained Adams as the starting strong safety. Head coach Chuck Pagano named him the starter to begin the season, along with free safety Clayton Geathers.

On October 16, 2016, Adams collected a season-high nine combined tackles in the Colts' 26–23 loss at the Houston Texans in Week 6. Adams was sidelined for the Colts' Week 9 win at the Green Bay Packers after injuring his groin the previous week. In Week 13, he made three combined tackles, broke up a pass, and returned an interception for a 56-yard gain during a 41–10 victory at the New York Jets. He finished the season with 79 combined tackles (62 solo), two pass deflections, and two interceptions in 15 games and 15 starts. Adams earned an overall grade of 83.3 from Pro Football Focus, which ranked 19th among all qualifying safeties in 2016.

==== 2017 ====
On March 6, 2017, Adams announced that the Indianapolis Colts informed him of their intentions to not offer him a contract or re-sign him. At age 36, Adams had three successful seasons with the Colts that earned him appearances in two Pro Bowls. The Colts decided to go with their younger core of safeties in Clayton Geathers, T. J. Green, and Darius Butler.

=== Carolina Panthers ===
On March 10, 2017, the Carolina Panthers signed Adams to a two-year, $4.20 million contract with $1.15 million guaranteed and a signing bonus of $650,000. Adams entered training camp slated as the starting free safety after the Panthers waived Tre Boston. Head coach Ron Rivera officially named him the starter entering the regular season, opposite strong safety Kurt Coleman. On October 1, 2017, Adams collected a season-high seven solo tackles and two pass deflections in the Panthers' 33–30 victory at the New England Patriots in Week 4. In Week 6, he had a season-high eight combined tackles during a 28–23 loss to the Philadelphia Eagles. He finished his first season with the Carolina Panthers with 69 combined tackles (48 solo), ten pass deflections, and two interceptions in 16 games and 16 starts. Pro Football Focus gave Adams an overall grade of 82.4, which ranked 24th among all qualifying safeties in 2017.

The Carolina Panthers finished second in the NFC South with an 11–5 record and received a wildcard berth. On January 7, 2018, Adams started in the NFC Wildcard Game and recorded four combined tackles, a pass deflection, and intercepted a pass by quarterback Drew Brees during the Panthers' 31–26 loss at the New Orleans Saints.

In Week 5 of the 2018 season, Adams recorded his fifth career game with two interceptions in the 33–31 victory over the New York Giants.

=== Houston Texans ===
On September 30, 2019, Adams was signed by the Houston Texans.

Adams announced his retirement from the NFL on Good Morning Football on March 4, 2020.

== NFL coaching career ==
=== Chicago Bears ===
On February 2, 2021, Adams landed his first NFL coaching job with the Chicago Bears.

=== New York Giants ===
On July 24, 2023, he was named assistant special teams coach for the New York Giants.

On February 15, 2024, Adams was named as assistant secondary for the Giants.

== NFL career statistics ==
Year	Team	Games		Tackles					Interceptions						Fumbles	
Year	Team	GP	GS	Cmb	Solo	Ast	Sck	Sfty	PD	Int	Yds	Avg	Lng	TD	FF	FR
2004	SF	8	0	9	5	4	0.0	0	0	1	0	0.0	0	0	0	1
2005	SF	14	10	74	57	17	1.0	0	5	4	36	9.0	40T	1	1	1
2006	SF	16	8	64	54	10	0.0	0	3	0	0	0.0	0	0	0	0
2007	CLE	15	0	29	27	2	1.0	0	1	0	0	0.0	0	0	0	1
2008	CLE	14	5	44	36	8	0.0	0	2	2	18	9.0	18	0	0	1
2009	CLE	16	9	69	58	11	1.0	0	8	0	0	0.0	0	0	0	1
2010	CLE	15	2	45	39	6	1.0	0	6	2	51	25.5	26	0	0	0
2011	CLE	16	16	64	44	20	0.0	0	6	3	33	11.0	29	0	1	1
2012	DEN	16	16	80	60	20	1.0	1	11	0	0	0.0	0	0	2	2
2013	DEN	16	7	64	48	16	0.0	0	6	1	3	3.0	3	0	0	1
2014	IND	16	16	87	67	20	0.0	0	11	5	24	4.8	10	0	2	2
2015	IND	13	13	75	52	23	1.0	0	6	5	63	12.6	38	1	3	1
2016	IND	15	15	79	62	17	0.0	0	2	2	56	28.0	56	0	2	2
2017	CAR	16	16	69	48	21	0.0	0	10	2	42	21.0	40	0	2	2
2018	CAR	16	16	75	47	28	0.0	0	6	3	11	3.7	18	0	0	0
2019	HOU	6	0	3	2	1	0.0	0	0	0	0	0.0	0	0	0	0
Total		228	149	930	706	224	6.0	1	83	30	337	11.2	56	2	13	16

== Personal life ==
Adams was inducted into the Passaic Tech Hall of Fame in 2009 and had his jersey retired in 2010. Adams has two daughters, Maya and Avery.
