= Jonathan Newsome =

American football player (born 1991)

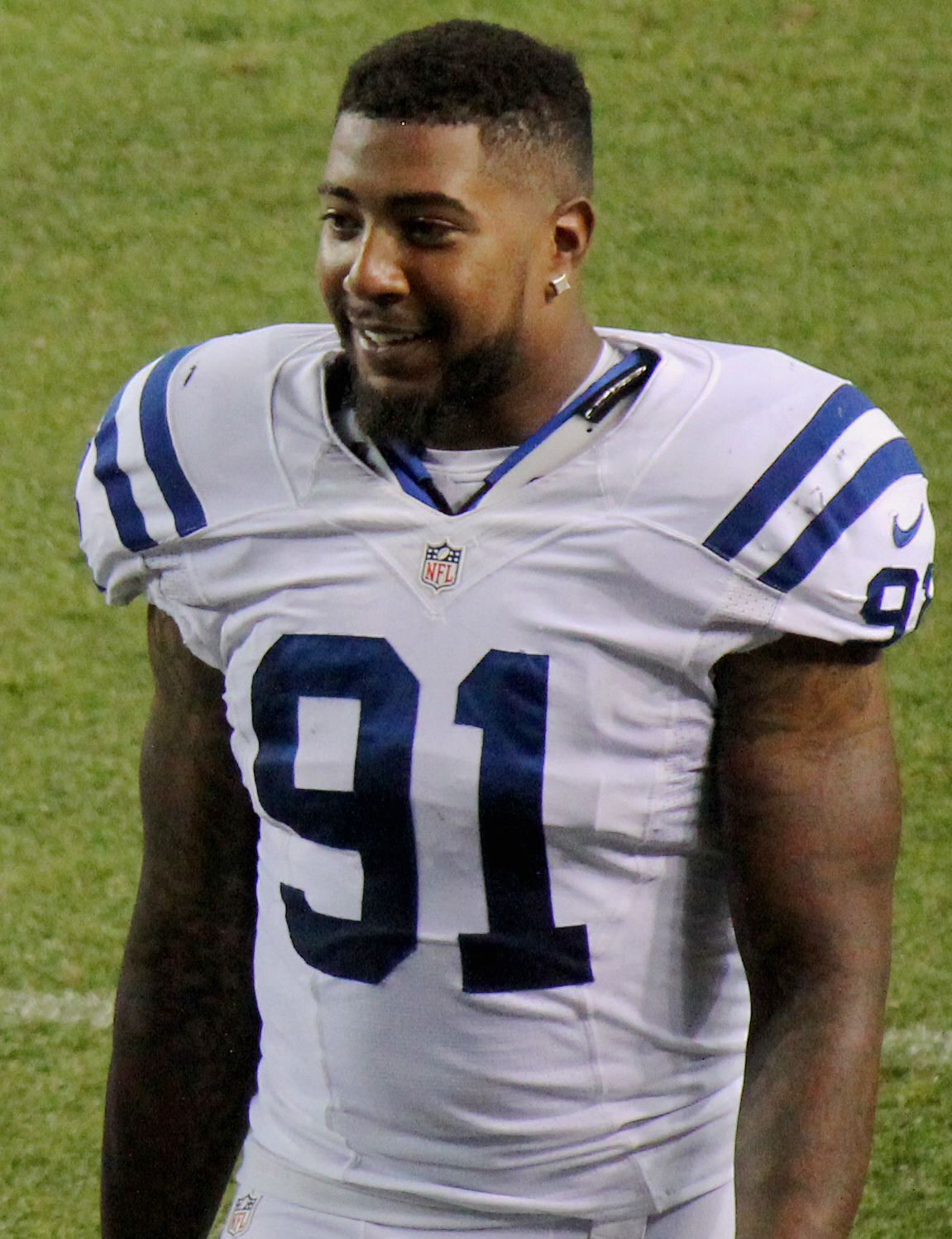
- Newsome with the Indianapolis Colts in 2014

No. 91, 43
- Position: Defensive end

Personal information
- Born: January 22, 1991 (age 35); Cleveland, Ohio, U.S.
- Listed height: 6 ft 3 in (1.91 m)
- Listed weight: 247 lb (112 kg)

Career information
- High school: Glenville (Cleveland)
- College: Ohio State; Ball State
- NFL draft: 2014: 5th round, 166th overall pick

Career history
- Indianapolis Colts (2014–2015); Saskatchewan Roughriders (2016–2017); Ottawa Redblacks (2017–2019); BC Lions (2019–2020); Birmingham Stallions (2022–2023)

Awards and highlights
- 2× USFL champion (2022, 2023); First-team All-MAC (2013); Second-team All-MAC (2012)

Career NFL statistics
- Games played: 30
- Starts: 3
- Total tackles: 47
- Sacks: 7.5
- Forced fumbles: 5
- Pass deflections: 2
- Stats at Pro Football Reference
- Stats at CFL.ca

Jonathan Newsome (born January 22, 1991) is an American former professional football player who was a defensive end in the National Football League (NFL) and Canadian Football League (CFL). He played college football for the Ohio State Buckeyes and Ball State Cardinals before being selected by the Indianapolis Colts in the fifth round of the 2014 NFL draft. He was also a member of the Saskatchewan Roughriders, Ottawa Redblacks and BC Lions of the CFL, and the Birmingham Stallions of the United States Football League (USFL).

== Early life ==
As a senior, Newsome was named All-Ohio second-team while playing for coach Ted Ginn Sr. at Glenville High School in Cleveland. He totaled 101 tackles and 17 sacks as a senior.

== College career ==
Newsome started his college career at Ohio State University. In 2009, he played in five games for the Buckeyes. In 2010, he earned his first collegiate start vs. Minnesota and played in all 13 of the Buckeyes games.

After his transfer to Ball State University, Newsome redshirted the 2011 season. He started 22 games in 2 seasons for the Cardinals, racking up 116 tackles (24 of them for a loss in yards), and 16.5 sacks for a total loss of 96 yards.

=== College awards ===
- 2013 All-Mid-American Conference first-team
- 2013 Rotary Lombardi Award Preseason Watch List
- 2013 Ted Hendricks Award Preseason Watch List
- 2013 Mid-American Conference West Division
- 2012 All-Mid-American Conference second-team

== Professional career ==
Pre-draft measurables
| Height | Weight | Arm length | Hand span | 40-yard dash | 20-yard shuttle | Three-cone drill | Vertical jump | Broad jump | Bench press |
|---|---|---|---|---|---|---|---|---|---|
| 6 ft 3 in (1.91 m) | 247 lb (112 kg) | 33 1/4 in (0.84 m) | 9 5/8 in (0.24 m) | 4.73 s | 4.63 s | 7.31 s | 34 in (0.86 m) | 117 in (2.97 m) | 21 reps |
All values from NFL Combine

=== Indianapolis Colts ===
Newsome was selected in the fifth round (164th overall) of the 2014 NFL draft by the Indianapolis Colts, becoming the first Ball State player to be drafted by the Colts. He recorded his first NFL tackle on the September 21, 2014, in the Colts' win over the Jacksonville Jaguars. In week 9, playing against the New York Giants, he recorded seven tackles, two sacks, and one forced fumble. Newsome made his first career start in week 17, and went on to win the AFC Defensive Player of the Week award for his performance. He finished the game with eight tackles, one forced fumble, and two sacks. Newsome finished the season with a team-leading 6.5 total sacks, the second-most amongst NFL rookies in 2014 and the third most by a rookie in Colts' franchise history. Newsome was released from the Colts on February 22, 2016, after being arrested by police for marijuana possession.

=== Saskatchewan Roughriders ===
On May 30, 2016, Newsome signed with the Saskatchewan Roughriders of the Canadian Football League (CFL). He played in all 18 regular season games in the 2016 season, contributing 27 defensive tackles, six special teams tackles and two quarterback sacks. In game 2 of the 2017 season, on July 1, 2017, Newsome recorded an interception in the Roughriders' 43–40 loss to Winnipeg. The Riders released Newsome three days later on July 4, 2017.

=== Ottawa Redblacks ===
Three days after being released by the Riders, Newsome signed with the Ottawa Redblacks. In his first game, Newsome recorded three tackles and sealed the win for the Redblacks with an interception. In nine games with Ottawa, Newsome recorded 13 tackles, four sacks, an interception, and a forced fumble. The following year, Newsome missed time with injury, but still had eight tackles and a sack in eight games played for 2018; a season where Ottawa played in the 106th Grey Cup. On December 20, 2018, Newsome signed a one-year extension with Ottawa; in the 2018 postseason and in 2019 training camp the team experimented with a designated package of plays for Newsome, moving him around the field to a variety of linebacker positions. After playing in six games for Ottawa and recording one defensive tackle and three special teams tackles, Newsome was released.

=== BC Lions ===
On August 20, 2019, Newsome was signed by the BC Lions to a practice roster agreement. That week he was activated to the active roster. On September 13, 2019, he recorded two defensive tackles and had a key sack on third and goal against the Redblacks, his former team. In eight games with the Lions, Newsome recorded 14 defensive tackles, a special teams tackle, four sacks and a forced fumble.

Newsome announced his retirement from professional football in March 2021 through his Instagram account.

=== Birmingham Stallions ===
Newsome later came out of retirement and was selected in the 4th round of the 2022 USFL draft by the Birmingham Stallions. He was placed on the injured reserve list by the team on June 6, 2023. He became a free agent after the 2023 season.

== NFL career statistics ==
| Season | Team | Games | | Tackles | | | | | | Interceptions | | | | | Fumbles |
| Season | Team | GP | GS | Comb | Total | Ast | Sck | SFTY | PDef | Int | Yds | Avg | Lng | TDs | FF |
|---|---|---|---|---|---|---|---|---|---|---|---|---|---|---|---|
| 2014 | Indianapolis Colts | 16 | 1 | 28 | 21 | 7 | 6.5 | 0 | 0 | – | – | – | – | – | 3 |
| 2015 | Indianapolis Colts | 14 | 2 | 19 | 10 | 9 | 1.0 | 0 | 2 | – | – | – | – | – | 1 |
| | Total | 30 | 3 | 47 | 31 | 16 | 7.5 | 0 | 2 | 0 | 0 | 0.0 | 0 | 0 | 4 |
