= Ulrick John =

American football player (born 1992)

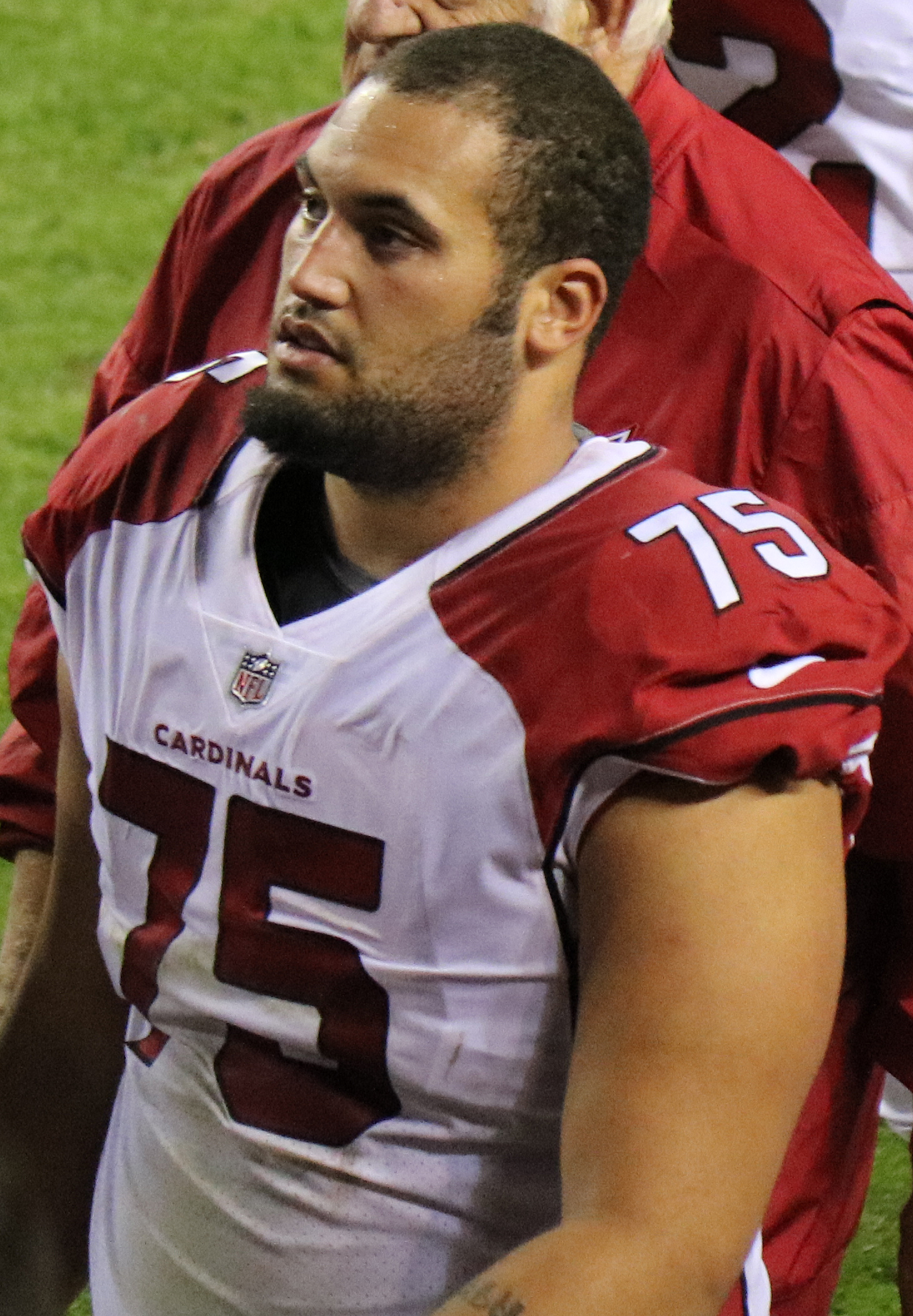
- John with the Arizona Cardinals in 2017

No. 68, 75, 74
- Position: Offensive tackle

Personal information
- Born: May 20, 1992 (age 34); Hinesville, Georgia, U.S.
- Listed height: 6 ft 5 in (1.96 m)
- Listed weight: 312 lb (142 kg)

Career information
- High school: Bradwell Institute (Hinesville)
- College: Georgia State
- NFL draft: 2014: 7th round, 232nd overall pick

Career history
- Indianapolis Colts (2014–2015); Miami Dolphins (2015–2016); Arizona Cardinals (2016–2017); Green Bay Packers (2017); New England Patriots (2018); New Orleans Saints (2019)*
- * Offseason or practice squad member only

Awards and highlights
- Super Bowl champion (LIII)

Career NFL statistics
- Games played: 10
- Games started: 3
- Stats at Pro Football Reference

Ulrick Tremayne John Jr. (born May 20, 1992) is an American former professional football player who was an offensive tackle in the National Football League (NFL). He played college football for the Georgia State Panthers, and was selected by the Indianapolis Colts in the seventh round of the 2014 NFL draft. He was also a member of the Miami Dolphins, Arizona Cardinals, Green Bay Packers, New England Patriots, and New Orleans Saints.

== College career ==
John played in four games off the bench as a freshman in Georgia State's inaugural season. In 2011, he played in 10 games, starting four, including starts at left tackle, center, and left guard. John started 10 games at left tackle in 2012 and started 11 games at left tackle in 2013. He was an All-Sun Belt honorable mention in 2013.

== Professional career ==
=== Indianapolis Colts ===
During the 2014 NFL draft, John was selected in the seventh round, 232nd overall, by the Indianapolis Colts. He was placed on injured reserve on August 26 with a right leg injury. On September 5, 2015, John was waived. He was signed to the practice squad the next day.

=== Miami Dolphins ===
On October 31, 2015, John was signed by the Miami Dolphins off the Colts practice squad.

John was released by the Dolphins during final roster cuts and was signed to the Dolphins' practice squad on September 4, 2016.

=== Arizona Cardinals ===
On October 8, 2016, John was signed by the Arizona Cardinals off the Dolphins' practice squad. He was placed on injured reserve on December 13, 2016 with a shoulder injury.

On September 12, 2017, John was released by the Cardinals and was re-signed to the practice squad.

=== Green Bay Packers ===
On September 26, 2017, John was signed by the Green Bay Packers off the Cardinals' practice squad.

=== New England Patriots ===
On April 23, 2018, John signed with the New England Patriots. On September 1, John was placed on injured reserve. The Patriots reached Super Bowl LIII where they defeated the Los Angeles Rams, making John the first player from Georgia State to be on a Super Bowl-winning team.

=== New Orleans Saints ===
On May 13, 2019, John signed with the New Orleans Saints. He was placed on injured reserve on August 10, 2019. He was released on August 15 with an injury settlement.
