= Tyler Hoover (American football) =

American football player (born 1990)

No. 63
- Position: Tackle

Personal information
- Born: January 28, 1990 (age 36); Novi, Michigan, U.S.
- Listed height: 6 ft 7 in (2.01 m)
- Listed weight: 297 lb (135 kg)

Career information
- High school: Novi (MI)
- College: Michigan State
- NFL draft: 2014: undrafted

Career history
- Indianapolis Colts (2014)*; Philadelphia Eagles (2014)*; Indianapolis Colts (2014–2015)*
- * Offseason or practice squad member only
- Stats at Pro Football Reference

Tyler Hoover (born January 28, 1990) is an American former football tackle. He attended Michigan State University and signed with the Indianapolis Colts as an undrafted free agent in 2014.

== Early life ==
Hoover attended Novi High School in his hometown of Novi, Michigan. He mostly played defensive end, but also saw time at offensive tackle, recording 109 tackles, 8.0 sacks, 5 forced fumbles, and 3 passes defensed as a senior. Hoover also played basketball for his high school, where he lettered for three years and was named the Kensington Valley Conference Defensive Player of the Year as a junior.

== College career ==
He then attended Michigan State University, where he played in 48 games (including 23 starts) and made 93 tackles, 9 tackles for loss, 7.5 sacks, 6 passes defensed, 3 forced fumbles, and 1 fumble recovery over 4 years. Hoover graduated with a degree in studio art.

== Professional career ==
Hoover signed as an undrafted free agent with the Indianapolis Colts on May 13, 2014. He was waived by the team on August 30, and signed to the practice squad on September 1. However, the following day he was released from the practice squad, and signed with the Philadelphia Eagles on September 9. On September 30, Hoover was released from the Eagles' practice squad. On December 17, the Colts signed him to their practice squad. On January 19, 2015, Hoover signed a reserve/future contract with the Colts.
