= Andrew Jackson (linebacker) =

American football player (born 1992)

No. 54
- Position: Linebacker

Personal information
- Born: March 16, 1992 (age 34); Lakeland, Florida, U.S.
- Listed height: 6 ft 1 in (1.85 m)
- Listed weight: 254 lb (115 kg)

Career information
- High school: Kathleen (Lakeland)
- College: Western Kentucky
- NFL draft: 2014: 6th round, 203rd overall pick

Career history
- Indianapolis Colts (2014); Spokane Empire (2017); Memphis Express (2019); Houston Roughnecks (2020)*; St. Louis BattleHawks (2020); Duke City Gladiators (2021)
- * Offseason or practice squad member only

Career NFL statistics
- Total tackles: 13
- Sacks: 1
- Stats at Pro Football Reference

Andrew Jackson (born March 16, 1992) is an American former professional football player who was a linebacker in the National Football League (NFL). He was selected by the Indianapolis Colts in the sixth round of the 2014 NFL draft. He played college football for the Western Kentucky Hilltoppers.

== College career ==
Jackson played college football for the Western Kentucky Hilltoppers.

== Professional career ==
Pre-draft measurables
Height	Weight	Arm length	Hand span	Wingspan	40-yard dash	10-yard split	20-yard split	20-yard shuttle	Three-cone drill	Vertical jump	Broad jump	Bench press
6 ft 0 7/8 in (1.85 m)	254 lb (115 kg)	32 1/2 in (0.83 m)	9 1/2 in (0.24 m)	6 ft 5 1/8 in (1.96 m)	4.90 s	1.70 s	2.82 s	4.24 s	7.28 s	32.5 in (0.83 m)	9 ft 11 in (3.02 m)	25 reps
All values from NFL Combine/Pro Day

=== Indianapolis Colts ===
Jackson was selected by the Colts in the sixth round (203rd overall) of the 2014 NFL draft. He played in 13 games during the 2014 season, making 10 total tackles and one quarterback sack. He was waived on February 11, 2015.

=== Spokane Empire ===
On August 30, 2016, Jackson signed with the Spokane Empire of the Indoor Football League.

=== Memphis Express ===
In 2019, Jackson joined the Memphis Express of the Alliance of American Football. In the fourth game of the 2019 AAF season against the San Diego Fleet, Jackson recorded 14 tackles, a sack, and an interception as the Express won 26–23; he was later named AAF Defensive Player of the Week. The league ceased operations in April 2019.

=== Houston Roughnecks ===
Jackson was selected in the 7th round during phase three in the 2020 XFL draft by the Houston Roughnecks. He was waived during final roster cuts on January 22, 2020.

=== St. Louis BattleHawks ===
Jackson signed with the St. Louis BattleHawks on February 18, 2020. His contract was terminated when the league suspended operations on April 10, 2020.

=== Duke City Gladiators ===
Jackson signed with the Duke City Gladiators on April 27, 2021.
