= Nnamdi Obukwelu =

American football player (born 1991)

Profile
- Position: Defensive tackle

Personal information
- Born: April 13, 1991 (age 35)
- Listed height: 6 ft 3 in (1.91 m)
- Listed weight: 303 lb (137 kg)

Career information
- High school: Boston College High (MA)
- College: Harvard
- NFL draft: 2014: undrafted

Career history
- Indianapolis Colts (2014)*
- * Offseason or practice squad member only

Awards and highlights
- First-team All-Ivy League (2013); 2013 George "Bulger" Lowe Award (New England Defensive Player of the Year)

Nnamdi Obukwelu (born April 13, 1991) is an American former football defensive tackle.

== College career ==
Obukwelu was a standout at Harvard University playing on the defensive line, primarily as a defensive tackle, and winning two Ivy League Championships while at Harvard. A three time All-Ivy selection, in 2013 he was tabbed as the winner of the George "Bulger" Lowe Award, awarded to New England's top defensive player. He graduated from Harvard with a degree in economics.

== Professional career ==
On May 13, 2014, Obukwelu was signed to an undrafted free agent contract with the Indianapolis Colts. He was released in August and then resigned to the practice squad on September 1, 2014. Three weeks later, Obukwelu was released after agreeing on an injury settlement. Obukwelu was featured on the NFL Network Show "Undrafted".
