= Gannon Conway =

American football player (born 1989)

Profile
- Position: Defensive end

Personal information
- Born: June 4, 1989 (age 37); Higley, Arizona
- Listed height: 6 ft 4 in (1.93 m)
- Listed weight: 280 lb (127 kg)

Career information
- High school: Higley (AZ)
- College: Arizona State
- NFL draft: 2014: undrafted

Career history
- Miami Dolphins (2014)*; Indianapolis Colts (2014–2015)*
- * Offseason or practice squad member only
- Stats at Pro Football Reference

Gannon Conway (born June 4, 1989) is an American football defensive end. He attended Arizona State University and signed with the Miami Dolphins as an undrafted free agent in 2014.

== High school & college ==
Conway attended Higley High School. In 2006, the football team earned both First-team All-State Offense and First-team All-Region Defense, and went to the state championship game. He was also a member of the wrestling team, and took second in state wrestling in 2007. Conway then attended Mesa Community College from August to December 2008, and helped the team become Valley of the Sun Bowl Champions. He enrolled at Arizona State University in 2010 as a walk-on, and was awarded a scholarship in 2011. Conway played in 30 games for ASU, recording 51 tackles, 9 tackles for loss, 5.5 sacks, and 2 passes defensed.

== Professional career ==
Conway signed with the Miami Dolphins as an undrafted free agent on May 13, 2014, and was released three days later. On June 11, he signed with the Indianapolis Colts, and was waived on July 15. On August 11, he re-signed with the Colts, and was waived on August 30. On January 15, 2015, Conway signed to the Colts' practice squad, and four days later he signed a reserve/future contract.

== Personal life ==
Conway lived in the Dominican Republic from 2008 to 2010, and is fluent in Spanish.
