= Delano Howell =

American football player (born 1989)

No. 36, 26
- Position: Safety

Personal information
- Born: November 17, 1989 (age 36); Los Angeles, California, U.S.
- Listed height: 5 ft 11 in (1.80 m)
- Listed weight: 196 lb (89 kg)

Career information
- High school: Hart (Newhall, California)
- College: Stanford
- NFL draft: 2012: undrafted

Career history
- Buffalo Bills (2012); Indianapolis Colts (2012–2014)

Awards and highlights
- Jack Huston Award (2011); First-team All-Pac-12 (2011); Second-team All-Pac-10 (2010)

Career NFL statistics
- Total tackles: 21
- Pass deflections: 1
- Total touchdowns: 1
- Stats at Pro Football Reference

Delano Andre Howell (born November 17, 1989) is a former safety. He was originally signed by the Buffalo Bills as an undrafted free agent in 2012. Howell played his four years of college football at Stanford University first as a running back, before switching to safety. He is the younger brother of Dan Howell, who played football for the University of Washington.

== High school ==
Howell attended William S. Hart High School in Newhall, California where he played football for the Indians as a running back and ran track as a sprinter, long jumper, and triple jumper. Rivals.com selected him as the number 16 all-purpose back in the country and was chosen by PrepStar to be part of the All-West Region for the class of 2008 as well as a first-team all-state selection. Howell set multiple school records in his time at Hart, including rushing yards (4,502), total touchdowns (82), points scored (494), and yards from scrimmage (5,930). He was named the 2007 CIF-Southern Section Northern Division Offensive Player of the Year.

== Collegiate career ==
Howell competed in both football and track & field at Stanford University where he wore number 26 on the field. In track & field, he owned Stanford's best mark of 2011 in the long jump at 23–8 ^{3}/_{4}.

As a freshman, Howell played football as a running back where he had a season best 59 rushing yards and 94 passing yards against San Jose State and as a kickoff returner where he averaged 25.8 yards per return.

In his second year, he transferred to defense as a strong safety and totaled two interceptions, three pass breakups, and one fumble recovery. When he played the University of Washington he became the first Stanford player to have two interceptions in one game since 2007 and had a career-high 15 tackles against California.

Junior year Howell made the All-Pac-10 second-team and had 60 tackles, including 8 against USC, 11 against the University of Arizona and 12 against Notre Dame. Against the University of Oregon, Howell picked up 8 tackles, an interception, and a fumble recovery.

In his final year at Stanford, Howell missed three games due to a hand injury. He went on, however, to total seven tackles against Oklahoma State in Cardinal's 41–38 loss in the 2012 Fiesta Bowl. He was awarded the Jack Huston Award for "the player who best exemplifies aggressiveness, exceptional performance and unheralded efforts" and was named to the All-Pac-12 Conference first-team.

Howell ended his career at Stanford with 190 total tackles and seven interceptions in his 34 games.

== Professional career ==
Pre-draft measurables
Height	Weight	Arm length	Hand span	40-yard dash	10-yard split	20-yard split	20-yard shuttle	Three-cone drill	Vertical jump	Broad jump	Bench press
5 ft 10 7/8 in (1.80 m)	210 lb (95 kg)	31 1/4 in (0.79 m)	9 1/4 in (0.23 m)	4.50 s	1.59 s	2.65 s	4.15 s	6.97 s	38.5 in (0.98 m)	10 ft 1 in (3.07 m)	21 reps
All values from NFL Combine

Howell was signed as an undrafted free agent by the Buffalo Bills in April 2012 as a strong safety — the same position he played for three years in college. He is the seventh Hart High School graduate to play professionally after Miami quarterback Matt Moore and former Oakland quarterback Kyle Boller.

He was signed by the Indianapolis Colts on November 28, 2012. On October 6, 2013, Howell returned a field goal blocked by Lawrence Guy 61 yards for a Touchdown, with the Colts trailing 12–7 at the time. The play turned out to be one of the key moments in the Colts 34–28 win over the eventual Super Bowl XLVIII champion Seattle Seahawks.
