= David Sims (safety) =

American gridiron football player (born 1986)

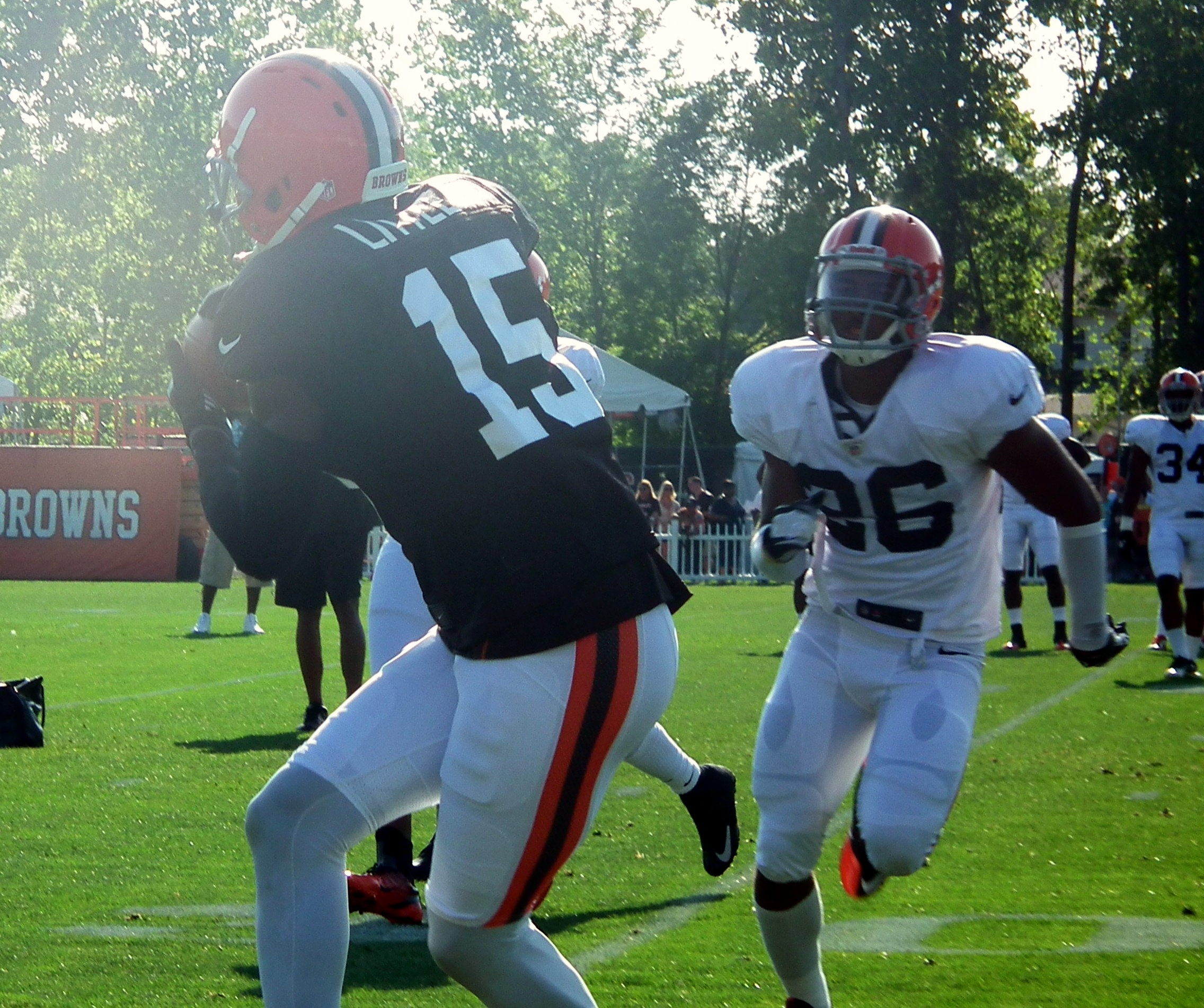
- Sims (#36) with the Cleveland Browns in 2012

No. 21, 36
- Position: Safety

Personal information
- Born: October 20, 1986 (age 40); Gainesville, Florida, U.S.
- Listed height: 5 ft 9 in (1.75 m)
- Listed weight: 199 lb (90 kg)

Career information
- High school: Gainesville
- College: Iowa State
- NFL draft: 2011: undrafted

Career history
- New York Giants (2011)*; Tampa Bay Buccaneers (2011); Cleveland Browns (2011–2012)*; Philadelphia Eagles (2012); Indianapolis Colts (2014)*; Toronto Argonauts (2015)*
- * Offseason or practice squad member only

Awards and highlights
- Big 12 Defensive Newcomer of the Year (2009)

Career NFL statistics
- Total tackles: 15
- Pass deflections: 1
- Stats at Pro Football Reference

David Sims (born October 20, 1986) is an American former professional football player who was a safety in the National Football League (NFL). He was signed by the New York Giants as an undrafted free agent in 2011. He played college football for the Iowa State Cyclones.

He was also a member of the Tampa Bay Buccaneers, Cleveland Browns, Philadelphia Eagles, Indianapolis Colts and Toronto Argonauts.

== Professional career ==
Sims was signed by the New York Giants as an undrafted free agent on July 28, 2011. He was released prior to the start of the regular season.

He was signed by Tampa Bay as a free agent on November 1, but was released three days later.

He then signed with the Cleveland Browns practice squad on November 29 where he remained for the rest of the season.

=== Philadelphia Eagles ===
The Philadelphia Eagles traded a conditional draft pick to the Browns for Sims on August 31, 2012.

=== Indianapolis Colts ===
On February 10, 2014, Sims signed with the Indianapolis Colts. The Colts released Sims on August 25, 2014.

=== Toronto Argonauts ===
On December 5, 2014, Sims signed with the Toronto Argonauts of the Canadian Football League. He was released by the Argonauts on May 12, 2015.
