= Roy Anderson (American football) =

American football coach (born 1980)

Philadelphia Eagles
- Title: Cornerbacks coach

Personal information
- Born: October 5, 1980 (age 46); Tallahassee, Florida, U.S.

Career information
- High school: Tallahassee (FL) Amos P. Godby
- College: Howard

Career history
- Florida A&M (2002) Graduate assistant; Florida State (2003) Student assistant; LSU (2004) Graduate assistant; Baltimore Ravens (2005–2007) Player personnel assistant; Baltimore Ravens (2008) Coaching assistant; Baltimore Ravens (2009–2011) Defensive assistant; Indianapolis Colts (2012–2015) Safeties coach; San Francisco 49ers (2016) Safeties coach; Chicago Bears (2017–2018) Assistant defensive backs coach; LSU (2019) Defensive analyst; Minnesota Vikings (2020–2022) Assistant defensive backs coach; Seattle Seahawks (2023) Secondary coach; Philadelphia Eagles (2024–present) Cornerbacks coach

Awards and highlights
- Super Bowl champion (LIX); CFP national champion (2019)

Roy Anderson (born October 5, 1980) is an American football coach for the Philadelphia Eagles of the National Football League (NFL).

== Coaching career ==
Anderson's career began at Florida A&M where, in 2002, he served as a graduate assistant. In 2003, at LSU under Nick Saban, Anderson was a student assistant working primarily with wide receivers. He then moved on to Florida State where he worked under the legendary Bobby Bowden as a graduate assistant.

He would spend the next three seasons as a player personnel assistant with the Baltimore Ravens before being promoted to a coaching assistant position in 2008 with the arrival of John Harbaugh. In 2009, Anderson earned another promotion, this time to defensive assistant. In 2010, Anderson was named the secondary coach. When Chuck Pagano, the former Ravens defensive coordinator, was hired as the head coach of the Indianapolis Colts, it was soon announced that Anderson would be following Pagano to Indianapolis to serve as the safeties coach. Roy Anderson would remain in that role until after the 2015 season, in which he was relieved of his duties. Anderson would not be out of a job for long however, on January 29, 2016, it was announced that he was hired as the assistant defensive backs coach of the San Francisco 49ers.

In 2017, Anderson became the Chicago Bears' assistant defensive backs coach, a position he held until the end of the 2018 season.

In 2019, Anderson was hired as a defensive analyst at LSU. Anderson won the National Championship of the College Football Playoff in his first and only year at LSU.

In 2020, Anderson was hired as an assistant defensive backs coach for the Minnesota Vikings. He was retained by the Vikings for the 2022 season after the firing of Mike Zimmer

On March 14, 2023, Anderson was hired by the Seattle Seahawks to replace Sean Desai as their secondary coach.

Anderson was the cornerbacks coach on the 2024 Philadelphia Eagles team that won Super Bowl LIX.
