= Dwayne Allen =

American football player (born 1990)

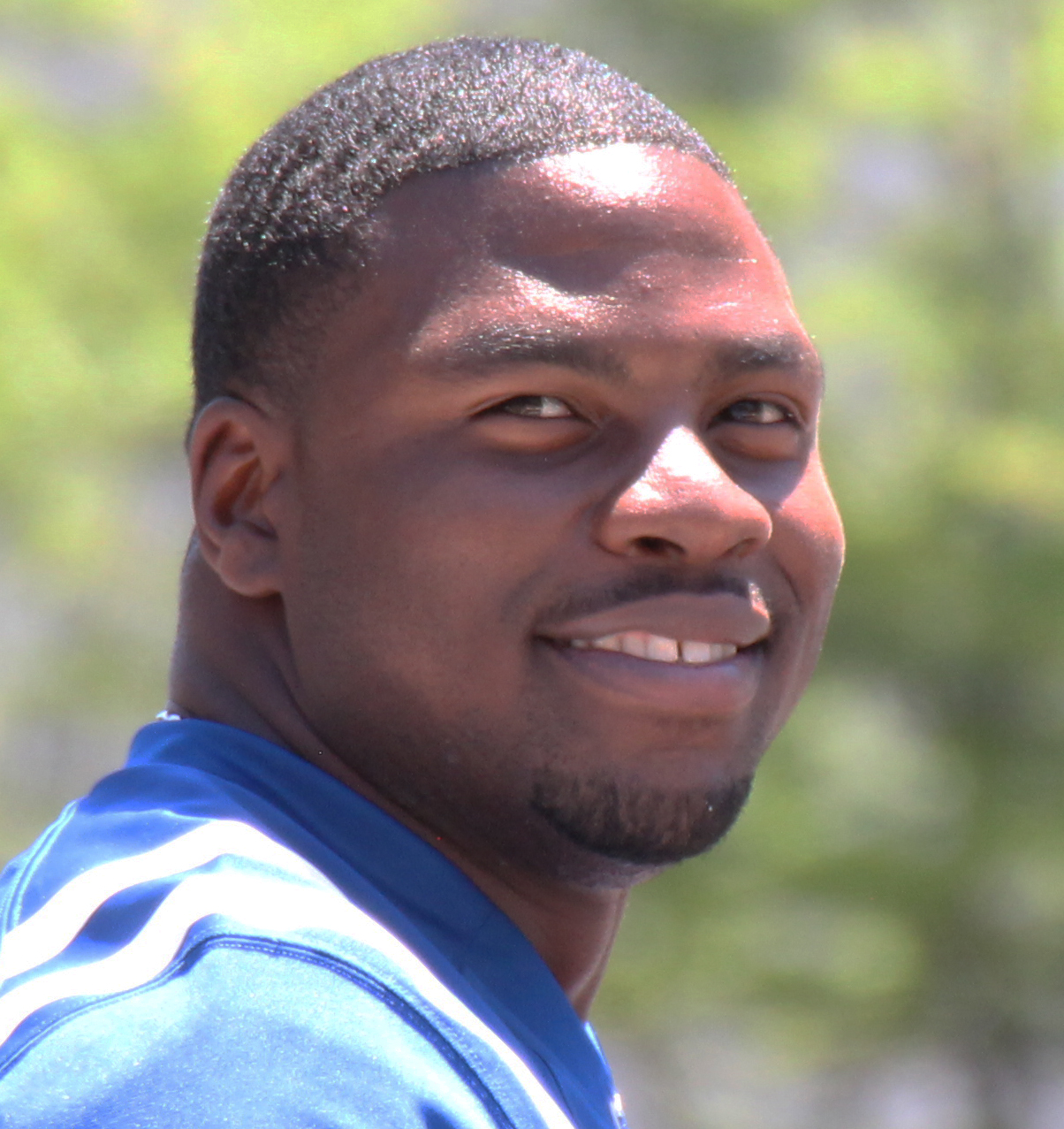
- Allen with the Indianapolis Colts in 2015

No. 83
- Position: Tight end

Personal information
- Born: February 24, 1990 (age 36); Fayetteville, North Carolina, U.S.
- Listed height: 6 ft 3 in (1.91 m)
- Listed weight: 265 lb (120 kg)

Career information
- High school: Terry Sanford (Fayetteville)
- College: Clemson (2008–2011)
- NFL draft: 2012: 3rd round, 64th overall pick

Career history
- Indianapolis Colts (2012–2016); New England Patriots (2017–2018); Miami Dolphins (2019)*
- * Offseason or practice squad member only

Awards and highlights
- Super Bowl champion (LIII); PFWA All-Rookie Team (2012); John Mackey Award (2011); Consensus All-American (2011); First-team All-ACC (2011); Second-team All-ACC (2010)

Career NFL statistics
- Receptions: 139
- Receiving yards: 1,564
- Receiving average: 11.3
- Receiving touchdowns: 20
- Stats at Pro Football Reference

Dwayne Lamont Allen (born February 24, 1990) is an American former professional football tight end who played in the National Football League (NFL) for seven seasons. He played college football for the Clemson Tigers, winning the John Mackey Award in 2011. Allen was selected in the third round of the 2012 NFL draft by the Indianapolis Colts, where spent his first five seasons. During his final two seasons, Allen played for the New England Patriots, making consecutive Super Bowl appearances in each and winning Super Bowl LIII.

== Early life ==
Allen was born in Fayetteville, North Carolina. He attended Terry Sanford High School in Fayetteville, and played high school football for the Terry Sanford Bulldogs. During his career, he had 68 receptions for 1,257 yards.

== College career ==
Allen attended Clemson University, where he played for the Clemson Tigers football team from 2008 to 2011. He was redshirted in 2008. In 2009, he started six of 14 games and had 10 receptions for 108 yards and three touchdowns. He started all 13 games in 2010 and was a second-team All-ACC selection after recording 33 receptions for 373 yards with a touchdown.

Through the first seven games of his junior season, Allen had 27 receptions for 381 yards and four touchdowns.

Allen was named the 2011 recipient of the John Mackey Award on December 8, 2011, at the Home Depot College Football Awards Red Carpet Show. He graduated from Clemson on August 9, 2014.

== Professional career ==
Pre-draft measurables
Height	Weight	Arm length	Hand span	40-yard dash	10-yard split	20-yard split	20-yard shuttle	Three-cone drill	Vertical jump	Broad jump	Bench press
6 ft 3 1/8 in (1.91 m)	255 lb (116 kg)	33 in (0.84 m)	9 5/8 in (0.24 m)	4.89 s	1.73 s	2.85 s	4.37 s	7.12 s	32 in (0.81 m)	9 ft 2 in (2.79 m)	27 reps
All values from NFL Combine

=== Indianapolis Colts ===
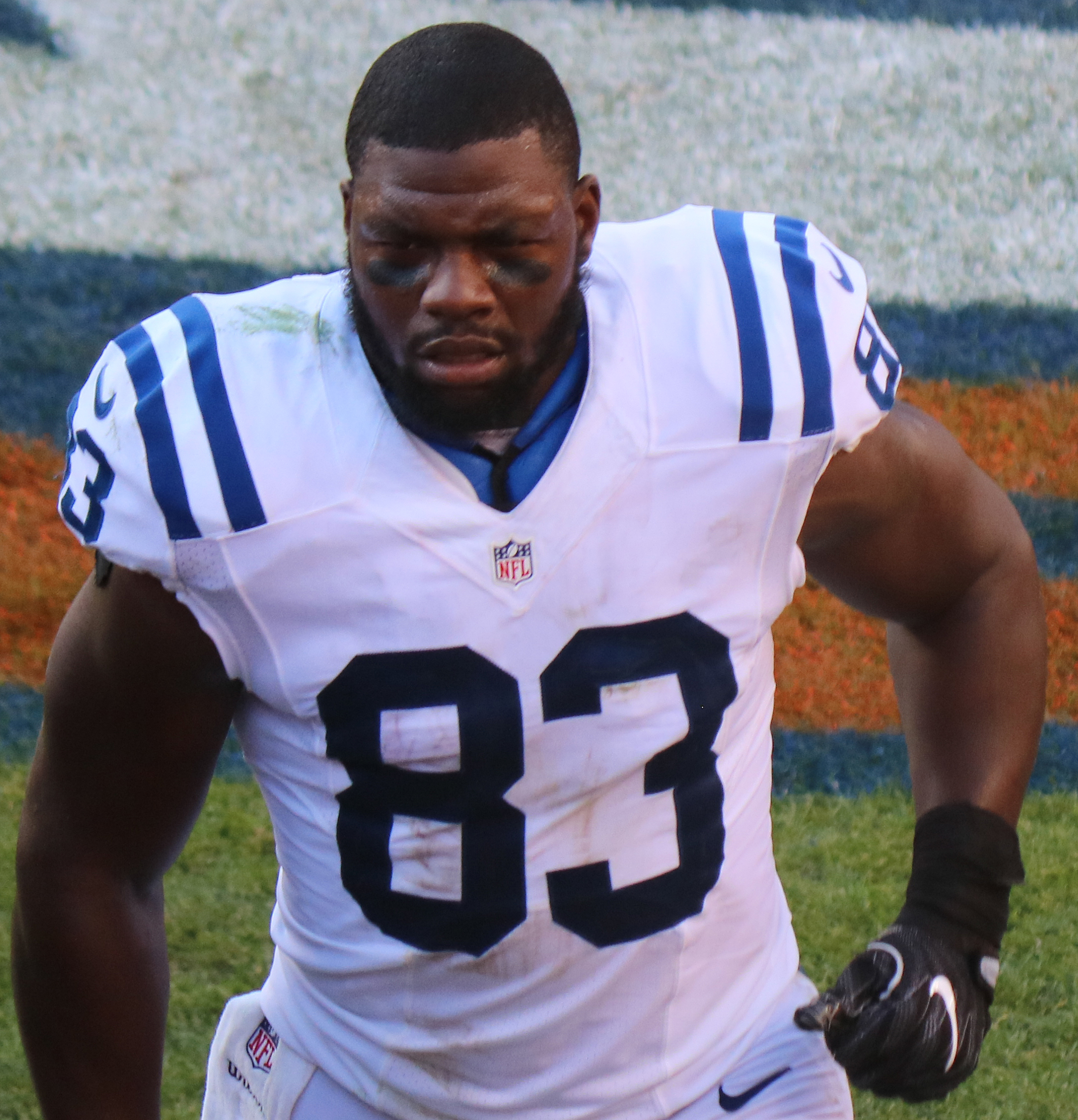
Allen in 2016

Allen was drafted in the third round with the 64th overall pick by the Indianapolis Colts in the 2012 NFL draft. He was the second tight-end taken in the draft as well as the second taken by the Colts. He helped fellow rookie Andrew Luck lead the Colts to an 11–5 record. Despite their draft positions, Allen actually bested his teammate (taken 34th overall), Coby Fleener, in overall production ranking 7th best among the league's rookie receiving leaders. Allen and fellow rookie teammates T. Y. Hilton, Fleener, Vick Ballard, and LaVon Brazill combined for an NFL record 3,108 yards – the most by any rookie class playing for an NFL club since the 1970 NFL merger. The second best performance was the Colts' 1999 rookie class with 2,751 yards. Allen finished the 2012 season with 521 receiving yards on 45 catches, and 3 touchdowns. He was named to the PFWA All-Rookie Team. Allen was intended to be a large part of new Colts offensive coordinator Pep Hamilton's offense in 2013, but was placed on the injured reserve following a hip injury in the first game of the season. He finished the season with one catch for 20 yards and a touchdown.

Allen battled a knee injury late in the 2014 season, but started 13 games for the Colts and finished with 29 receptions, 395 yards, and 8 touchdowns. On November 8, 2015, Allen was poked in the eye by Denver Broncos' cornerback Aqib Talib. Talib was given a one-game suspension for the incident the following day. On December 30, 2015, Allen was placed on injured reserve.

On March 7, 2016, Allen signed a four-year, $29.4 million extension with the Colts.

=== New England Patriots ===
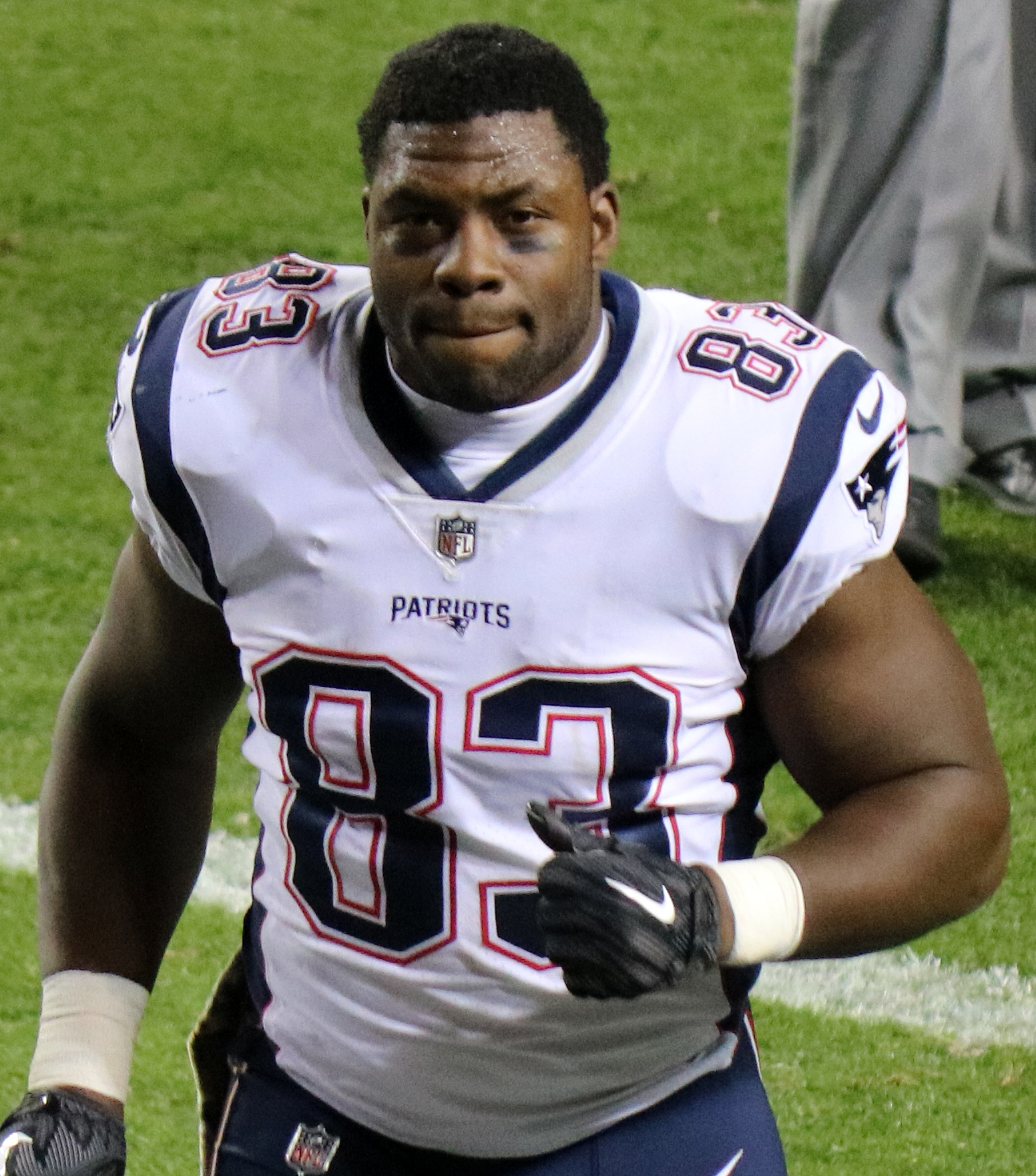
Allen with the New England Patriots in 2017

On March 9, 2017, the Colts traded Allen and a 2017 sixth-round draft pick to the New England Patriots for a 2017 fourth-round draft pick. The trade was the first between the Colts and Patriots since 1985.

On November 12, 2017, on Sunday Night Football, Allen made his first reception with the Patriots when he caught an 11-yard touchdown pass from Tom Brady. The play made Allen the 68th NFL player to catch a touchdown from Brady. Allen reached Super Bowl LII with the Patriots, but lost 41–33 to the Philadelphia Eagles.

In 2018 with the Patriots, Allen only had three catches for 27 yards during the season, although he was praised by the team for his blocking. Allen won Super Bowl LIII with the Patriots, when they defeated the Los Angeles Rams 13–3.

On March 2, 2019, Allen was released by the Patriots.

=== Miami Dolphins ===
On March 9, 2019, Allen was signed by the Miami Dolphins to a two-year, $6.5 million deal. He was released with an injury settlement on August 31, 2019.

== NFL career statistics ==
=== Regular season ===
Year	Team	Games		Receiving					Rushing					Fumbles	
Year	Team	GP	GS	Rec	Yds	Avg	Lng	TD	Att	Yds	Avg	Lng	TD	Fum	Lost
2012	IND	16	16	45	521	11.6	40	3	3	5	1.7	3	0	1	0
2013	IND	1	1	1	20	20.0	20T	1	—	—	—	—	—	0	0
2014	IND	13	13	29	395	13.6	41T	8	—	—	—	—	—	1	0
2015	IND	13	12	16	109	6.8	21	1	1	1	1.0	1	0	0	0
2016	IND	14	14	35	406	11.6	23T	6	—	—	—	—	—	1	0
2017	NE	16	8	10	86	8.6	22	1	—	—	—	—	—	0	0
2018	NE	13	8	3	27	9.0	21	0	—	—	—	—	—	0	0
Total		86	72	139	1,564	11.3	41	20	4	6	1.5	3	0	3	0

=== Postseason ===
Year	Team	Games		Receiving					Rushing					Fumbles	
Year	Team	GP	GS	Rec	Yds	Avg	Lng	TD	Att	Yds	Avg	Lng	TD	Fum	Lost
2012	IND	1	1	4	51	12.8	22	0	—	—	—	—	—	0	0
2014	IND	3	2	11	90	8.2	18	1	—	—	—	—	—	0	0
2017	NE	3	0	—	—	—	—	—	—	—	—	—	—	0	0
2018	NE	3	1	—	—	—	—	—	—	—	—	—	—	0	0
Total		10	4	15	141	9.4	22	1	0	0	0.0	0	0	0	0
