= Aiono =

Aiono is both a surname and a given name. Notable people with the name include:

- Aiono Nonumalo Sofara, Samoan chief
- Aiono Fanaafi Le Tagaloa (1932–2014), Samoan chief, historian, and writer
- Alex Aiono (born 1996), American singer and YouTuber
- James Aiono (born 1989), American football player
- Uluomato'otua ("Ulu") Saulaulu Aiono (born 1954), Samoan-born New Zealand technology entrepreneur, civic leader, and philanthropist
