= 2012 Indianapolis Colts season =

60th season in franchise history; first with Andrew Luck

- Owner: Jim Irsay
- General manager: Ryan Grigson
- Head coach: Chuck Pagano; Bruce Arians (interim; weeks 5–16)
- Offensive coordinator: Bruce Arians
- Defensive coordinator: Greg Manusky
- Home stadium: Lucas Oil Stadium

Results
- Record: 11–5
- Division place: 2nd AFC South
- Playoffs: Lost Wild Card Playoffs (at Ravens) 9–24
- Pro Bowlers: WR Reggie Wayne; OLB Robert Mathis; QB Andrew Luck

Uniform
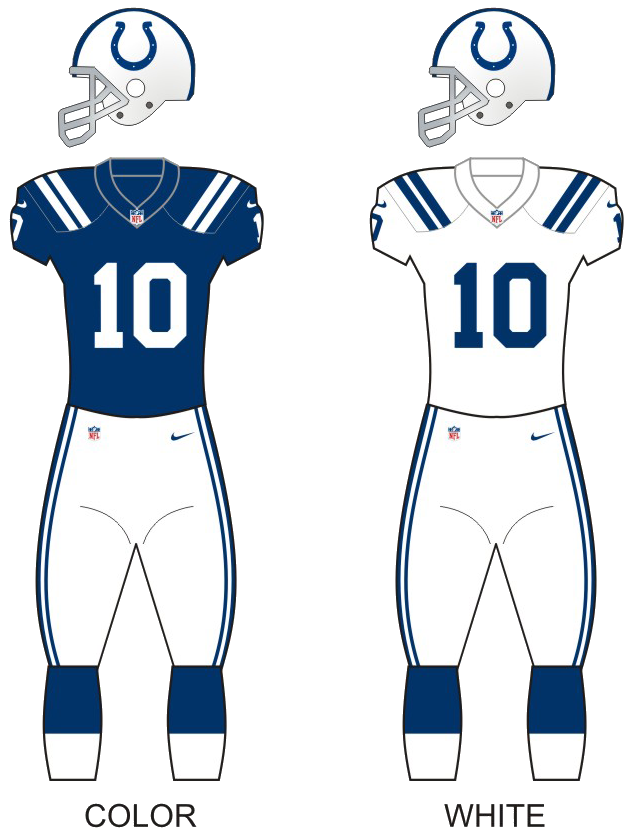

The 2012 season was the Indianapolis Colts' 60th in the National Football League (NFL), their 29th in Indianapolis, and their fifth playing their home games at Lucas Oil Stadium. The Colts earned the first selection in the 2012 NFL draft due to a dismal 2–14 record in 2011 and used their first pick on Stanford quarterback Andrew Luck. The season marked the first for both head coach Chuck Pagano and general manager Ryan Grigson with the franchise.

In the offseason, the Colts released quarterback Peyton Manning, who had been with the team since 1998, after having missed the previous season due to neck surgeries.

Offensive coordinator Bruce Arians served as interim head coach while Pagano underwent treatment for leukemia from week 5–16. Pagano returned, with his cancer in remission, during the final week of the regular season. The team went 9–3 under Arians, who won the Coach of the Year Award. The Colts earned a playoff berth, their first playoff appearance without Peyton Manning since 1996. They were defeated by the eventual Super Bowl champion Baltimore Ravens in the Wild Card round.

Football Outsiders calculated the 2012 Colts were the worst team to ever go 11–5 in a season.

== Personnel changes ==
On January 2, 2012, one day after the final game of the 2011 season, Colts owner Jim Irsay fired team Vice Chairman Bill Polian (who had been the team's general manager since 1998) and his son, team vice-president and general manager Chris Polian. Nine days later (January 11), Ryan Grigson was named the new general manager. Head coach Jim Caldwell was fired on January 17, 2012. Eight days later (January 25), former Baltimore Ravens' defensive coordinator Chuck Pagano agreed to becoming the Colts new head coach.

== Roster changes ==
=== Draft ===
2012 Indianapolis Colts draft
Round	Pick	Player	Position	College	Notes
1	1	Andrew Luck *	QB	Stanford	
2	34	Coby Fleener	TE	Stanford	
3	64	Dwayne Allen	TE	Clemson	
3	92	T. Y. Hilton *	WR	Florida International	Pick from SF^{[a]}
5	136	Josh Chapman	NT	Alabama	
5	170	Vick Ballard	RB	Mississippi State	Compensatory^{[c]}
6	206	LaVon Brazill	WR	Ohio	Compensatory^{[b]}^{[c]}
6	208	Justin Anderson	G	Georgia	
7	214	Tim Fugger	DE	Vanderbilt	Pick from PHI^{[b]}
7	253^{[d]}	Chandler Harnish	QB	NIU	Compensatory^{[c]}
Made roster † Pro Football Hall of Fame * Made at least one Pro Bowl during career

Notes

^{^[a]} During the draft, the Colts traded up five spots from the fourth-round (#97) to the third-round (#92), with the team sending a 2013 fifth-round selection to the San Francisco 49ers.
^{^[b]} The Colts traded their original sixth-round selection—#172 overall—to the Philadelphia Eagles in exchange for tackle Winston Justice and the Eagles' sixth round selection—#187 overall. The Colts later traded the #187 overall selection to the New York Jets in exchange for quarterback Drew Stanton and a seventh-round selection (#214 overall).
^{^[c]} Compensatory selections.
^{^[d]} Mr. Irrelevant.

=== Undrafted free agents ===
All undrafted free agents were signed just after the 2012 NFL draft concluded on April 28.

Position	Player	College
DT	James Aiono	Utah
DT	Chigbo Anunoby	Morehouse College
OL	Jason Foster	Rhode Island
LB	Chris Galippo	USC
T	Steve Baker	East Carolina
WR	Griff Whalen	Stanford
CB	Micah Pellerin	Hampton
CB	Antonio Fenelus	Wisconsin
CB	Cameron Chism	Maryland
DB	Buddy Jackson	Pittsburgh
OL	Hayworth Hicks	Iowa State
WR	Jabin Sambrano	Montana
S	Matt Merletti	North Carolina
P	Brian Stahovich	San Diego State
DE	Kevin Eagan	Endicott
S	Latarrius Thomas	Eastern Michigan

=== Departures ===
Position	Player	Tag	2012 Team	Reason
QB	Peyton Manning	UFA	Denver Broncos	Released by Colts, later signed by Broncos.
QB	Curtis Painter	UFA	Baltimore Ravens	Released by Colts, later signed by Ravens.
QB	Dan Orlovsky	UFA	Tampa Bay Buccaneers	Released by Colts, later signed by Buccaneers.
WR	Pierre Garçon	UFA	Washington Redskins	Released by Colts, later signed by Redskins.
WR	Blair White	UFA		Released by Colts.
RB	Joseph Addai	UFA	New England Patriots	Released by Colts, signed by Patriots.
FB	Jerome Felton	UFA	Minnesota Vikings	Released by Colts, signed with Vikings.
WR	Anthony Gonzalez	UFA	New England Patriots	Released by Colts, signed by Patriots.
TE	Dallas Clark	UFA	Tampa Bay Buccaneers	Released by Colts, signed by Buccaneers
TE	Jacob Tamme	UFA	Denver Broncos	Released by Colts, signed with Broncos.
C	Jeff Saturday	UFA	Green Bay Packers	Released by Colts, signed by Packers.
DE	Jamaal Anderson	UFA	Cincinnati Bengals	Released by Colts, signed by Bengals.
CB	Jacob Lacey	UFA	Detroit Lions	Untendered as a Restricted Free Agent, later signed by Lions.
LB	Gary Brackett	UFA		Released by Colts.
DB	Melvin Bullitt	UFA		Released by Colts.

=== Additions ===
Position	Player	Tag	2011 team	How acquired
WR	Donnie Avery	UFA	Tennessee Titans	Signed on March 25, 2012.
LB	Jerrell Freeman	UFA	Saskatchewan Roughriders (CFL)	Signed on January 16, 2012
C/G	Mike McGlynn	UFA	Cincinnati Bengals	Signed on March 15, 2012
NT	Brandon McKinney	UFA	Baltimore Ravens	Signed on April 4, 2012.
TE	Kyle Miller	UFA	None	Signed on April 3, 2012.
LS	Matt Overton	UFA	Omaha Nighthawks (UFL)	Signed on April 3, 2012.
DE	Cory Redding	UFA	Baltimore Ravens	Signed on March 14, 2012.
C	Samson Satele	UFA	Oakland Raiders	Signed on March 22, 2012.
QB	Trevor Vittatoe	UFA	Tampa Bay Storm (AFL)	Signed on March 8, 2012
SS	Tom Zbikowski	UFA	Baltimore Ravens	Signed on March 16, 2012.
TE	Dominique Jones	UFA	Reading Express (IFL)	Signed on April 30, 2012.
RB	Deji Karim	WVR	Jacksonville Jaguars	Claimed on April 30, 2012.
TE	Andre Smith	WVR	Chicago Bears	Claimed on May 15, 2012.
C/G	Zane Taylor	WVR	Philadelphia Eagles	Claimed on May 18, 2012.
RB	Mewelde Moore	UFA	Pittsburgh Steelers	Signed on June 19, 2012.
CB	D.J. Johnson	Trade	Philadelphia Eagles	Traded for on July 22, 2012.
CB	Vontae Davis	Trade	Miami Dolphins	Traded for on August 26, 2012.

== Staff ==
2012 Indianapolis Colts staff
Front office: Owner/CEO – James Irsay; General manager – Ryan Grigson; Vice president of football operations – Tom Telesco; Director of football administration – Mike Bluem; Director of college scouting – T. J. McCreight; Associate director of pro personnel – Kevin Rogers; Assistant director of college scouting – Todd Vasvari; Head coaches: Head coach – Chuck Pagano; Interim head coach/offensive coordinator – Bruce Arians; Offensive coaches: Quarterbacks – Clyde Christensen; Running backs – David Walker; Wide receivers – Charlie Williams; Tight ends – Alfredo Roberts; Offensive line – Harold Goodwin; Assistant offensive line – Joe Gilbert; Offensive quality control – Frank Giufre	Defensive coaches: Defensive coordinator – Greg Manusky; Defensive line – Gary Emanuel; Inside linebackers – Jeff FitzGerald; Outside linebackers – James Bettcher; Secondary – Mike Gillhamer; Safeties – Roy Anderson; Defensive quality control – Brad White; Special teams coaches: Special teams coordinator – Marwan Maalouf; Assistant special teams – Brant Boyer; Strength and conditioning: Strength and conditioning – Roger Marandino; Assistant strength and conditioning – Richard Howell

== Final roster ==
2012 Indianapolis Colts roster
Quarterbacks (QB): 12 Andrew Luck; 5 Drew Stanton; Running backs (RB): 33 Vick Ballard; 34 Delone Carter; 36 Deji Karim KR; 37 Mewelde Moore; Wide receivers (WR): 11 Donnie Avery; 15 LaVon Brazill; 13 T. Y. Hilton PR; 10 Nathan Palmer; 87 Reggie Wayne; Tight ends (TE): 83 Dwayne Allen; 80 Coby Fleener; 85 Weslye Saunders	Offensive linemen (OL): 74 Anthony Castonzo T; 78 Tony Hills T; 69 Winston Justice T; 72 Jeff Linkenbach G/T; 75 Mike McGlynn G; 73 Seth Olsen G; 76 Joe Reitz G; 64 Samson Satele C; 62 A. Q. Shipley C; 60 Bradley Sowell T; Defensive linemen (DL): 66 Clifton Geathers DE; 67 Lawrence Guy DE; 65 Kellen Heard NT; 99 Antonio Johnson NT; 91 Ricardo Mathews DE; 90 Cory Redding DE; 68 Martin Tevaseu NT	Linebackers (LB): 51 Pat Angerer ILB; 53 Kavell Conner ILB; 58 Moise Fokou ILB; 50 Jerrell Freeman ILB; 93 Dwight Freeney OLB; 54 Mario Harvey ILB; 92 Jerry Hughes OLB; 98 Robert Mathis OLB; 97 Jamaal Westerman OLB; Defensive backs (DB): 41 Antoine Bethea FS; 38 Sergio Brown FS; 20 Darius Butler CB; 23 Vontae Davis CB; 27 Josh Gordy CB; 26 Delano Howell FS; 35 Joe Lefggred SS; 32 Cassius Vaughn CB; 21 Teddy Williams CB; 28 Tom Zbikowski SS; Special teams (ST): 1 Pat McAfee P; 45 Matt Overton LS; 4 Adam Vinatieri K	Practice squad: 81 Kris Adams WR; 79 Justin Anderson T (IR); 30 Marshay Green CB; 8 Chandler Harnish QB; 46 Dominique Jones TE; 59 Shawn Loiseau LB; 39 Davin Meggett RB; 57 Monte Simmons LB; 63 Lee Ziemba T; Reserve: 31 Donald Brown RB (IR); 61 Josh Chapman NT (IR); 17 Austin Collie WR (IR); 52 A. J. Edds ILB (IR); 55 Justin Hickman OLB (IR); 29 Robert Hughes FB (IR); 71 Ben Ijalana T (IR); 56 Scott Lutrus ILB (IR); 96 Brandon McKinney NT (IR); 95 Fili Moala DE (IR); 94 Drake Nevis DE (IR); 25 Jerraud Powers CB (IR); 84 Griff Whalen WR (IR); Rookies in italics 53 active, 14 reserve, 8 practice squad

== Schedule ==
=== Preseason ===
Week	Date	Opponent	Result	Record	Venue	Recap
1	August 12	St. Louis Rams	**W** 38–3	1–0	Lucas Oil Stadium	Recap
2	August 19	at Pittsburgh Steelers	**L** 24–26	1–1	Heinz Field	Recap
3	August 25	at Washington Redskins	**L** 17–30	1–2	FedExField	Recap
4	August 30	Cincinnati Bengals	**W** 20–16	2–2	Lucas Oil Stadium	Recap

=== Regular season ===
Week	Date	Opponent	Result	Record	Venue	Recap
1	September 9	at Chicago Bears	**L** 21–41	0–1	Soldier Field	Recap
2	September 16	Minnesota Vikings	**W** 23–20	1–1	Lucas Oil Stadium	Recap
3	September 23	**Jacksonville Jaguars**	**L** 17–22	1–2	Lucas Oil Stadium	Recap
4	Bye					
5	October 7	Green Bay Packers	**W** 30–27	2–2	Lucas Oil Stadium	Recap
6	October 14	at New York Jets	**L** 9–35	2–3	MetLife Stadium	Recap
7	October 21	Cleveland Browns	**W** 17–13	3–3	Lucas Oil Stadium	Recap
8	October 28	at **Tennessee Titans**	**W** 19–13 (OT)	4–3	LP Field	Recap
9	November 4	Miami Dolphins	**W** 23–20	5–3	Lucas Oil Stadium	Recap
10	November 8	at **Jacksonville Jaguars**	**W** 27–10	6–3	EverBank Field	Recap
11	November 18	at New England Patriots	**L** 24–59	6–4	Gillette Stadium	Recap
12	November 25	Buffalo Bills	**W** 20–13	7–4	Lucas Oil Stadium	Recap
13	December 2	at Detroit Lions	**W** 35–33	8–4	Ford Field	Recap
14	December 9	**Tennessee Titans**	**W** 27–23	9–4	Lucas Oil Stadium	Recap
15	December 16	at **Houston Texans**	**L** 17–29	9–5	Reliant Stadium	Recap
16	December 23	at Kansas City Chiefs	**W** 20–13	10–5	Arrowhead Stadium	Recap
17	December 30	**Houston Texans**	**W** 28–16	11–5	Lucas Oil Stadium	Recap

Note: Intra-division opponents are in bold text.

== Game summaries ==
=== Regular season ===
==== Week 1: at Chicago Bears ====
Week One: Indianapolis Colts at Chicago Bears – Game summary

Quarter	1	2	3	4	Total
Colts	7	7	0	7	21
Bears	7	17	10	7	41

at Soldier Field, Chicago, Illinois

- Date: September 9
- Game time: 1:00 p.m. EDT/12:00 p.m. CDT
- Game weather: Partly cloudy, 67 °F (19 °C)
- Game attendance: 62,341
- Referee: Wayne Elliott
- TV announcers (CBS): Greg Gumbel and Dan Dierdorf

Game information

First quarter

- IND – Jerrell Freeman 4-yard interception return (Adam Vinatieri kick), 11:23. Colts 7–0.
- CHI – Michael Bush 1-yard run (Robbie Gould kick), 7:19. Tied 7–7. Drive: 11 plays, 80 yards, 4:04.

Second quarter

- CHI – Brandon Marshall 3-yard pass from Jay Cutler (Robbie Gould kick), 10:33. Bears 14–7. Drive: 11 plays, 96 yards, 5:52.
- CHI – Robbie Gould 35-yard field goal, 5:32. Bears 17–7. Drive: 7 plays, 46 yards, 4:08.
- IND – Donald Brown 18-yard run (Adam Vinatieri kick), 3:17. Bears 17–14. Drive: 5 plays, 77 yards, 2:15.
- CHI – Michael Bush 1-yard run (Robbie Gould kick), 0:44. Bears 24–14. Drive: 8 plays, 73 yards, 2:33.

Third quarter

- CHI – Matt Forte 6-yard run (Robbie Gould kick), 11:52. Bears 31–14. Drive: 4 plays, 55 yards, 2:10.
- CHI – Robbie Gould 26-yard field goal, 10:02. Bears 34–14. Drive: 4 plays, 4 yards, 1:44.

Fourth quarter

- IND – Donnie Avery 4-yard pass from Andrew Luck (Adam Vinatieri kick), 10:20. Bears 34–21. Drive: 12 plays, 80 yards, 4:52.
- CHI – Alshon Jeffery 42-yard pass from Jay Cutler (Robbie Gould kick), 6:08. Bears 41–21. Drive: 7 plays, 80 yards, 4:12.

Top passers

- IND – Andrew Luck – 23/45, 309 yards, TD, 3 INT
- CHI – Jay Cutler – 21/35, 333 yards, 2 TD, INT

Top rushers

- IND – Donald Brown – 9 rushes, 48 yards, TD
- CHI – Matt Forte – 16 rushes, 80 yards, TD

Top receivers

- IND – Reggie Wayne – 9 receptions, 135 yards
- CHI – Brandon Marshall – 9 receptions, 119 yards, TD

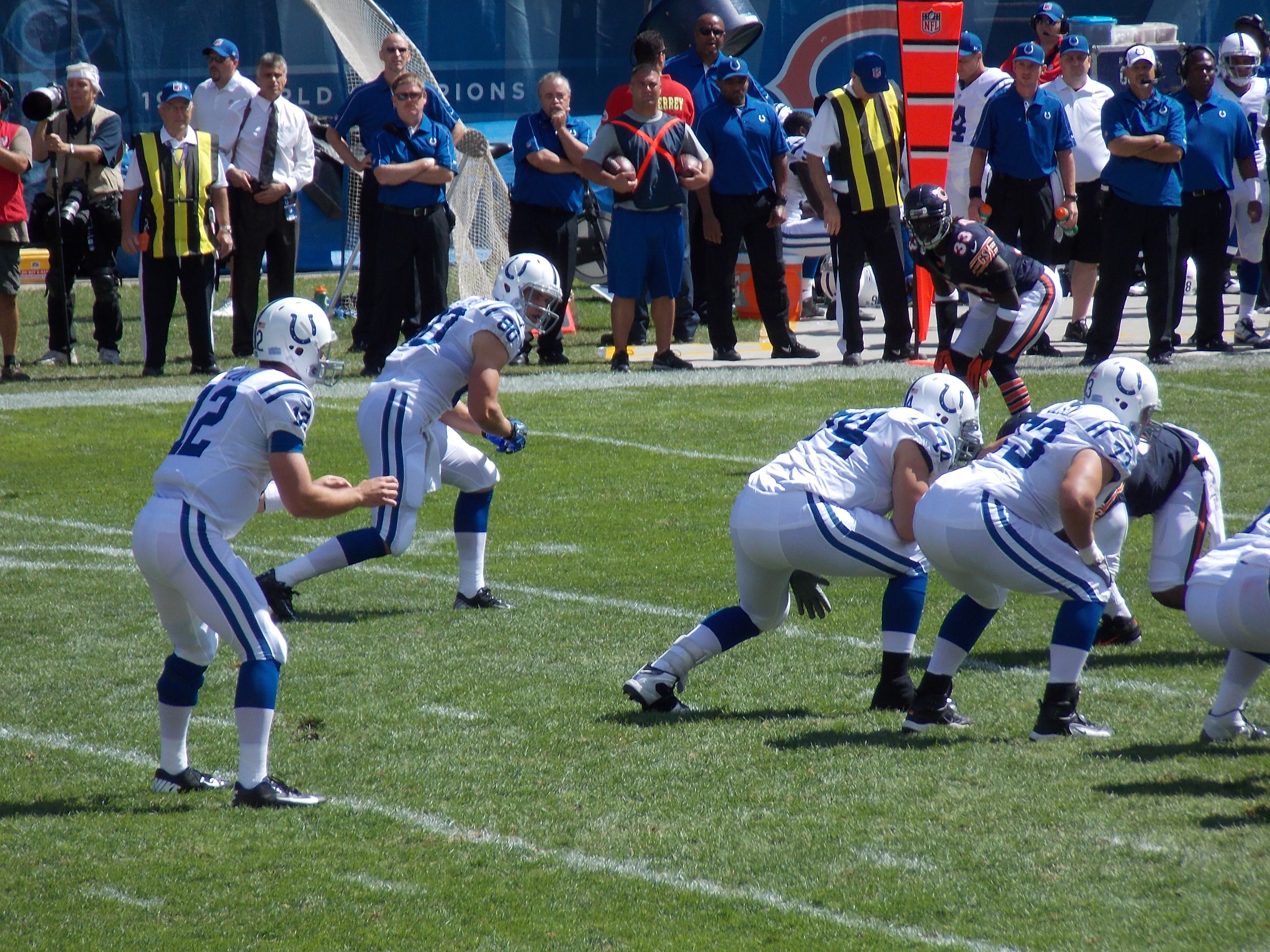
Andrew Luck takes the snap

The Colts began their season on the road against the Bears. The game was highly hyped due to the start of the career of rookie QB Andrew Luck. The Colts drew first blood in the first quarter as Jerrell Freeman returned an interception 3 yards for a touchdown and a 7–0 lead. However, the Bears tied the game with Michael Bush's 1-yard run to tie the game at 7–7. In the 2nd quarter, the Bears took the lead as Brandon Marshall caught a 3-yard touchdown pass from Jay Cutler to make the score 14–7. They then increased their lead when Robbie Gould scored a 35-yard field goal to make the score 17–7. The Colts drew closer to shorten the lead to 3 with Donald Brown's 18-yard touchdown run to make the score 17–14. However, with just seconds before halftime, the Bears drove down the field while Michael Bush ran in on a 1-yard touchdown for a 24–14 halftime lead. In the 3rd quarter the Bears gained momentum once more with Matt Forte's 6-yard touchdown run for a 31–14 lead and then Robbie Gould's 26-yard field goal for a 34–14 lead. In the fourth quarter, Luck threw his first touchdown pass of the regular season. A 4-yard pass to Donnie Avery to shorten the lead to 34–21. However, the Bears capitalized the victory with Cutler's 42-yard pass to Alshon Jeffery for a final score of 41–21.

With the loss, the Colts began their season 0–1.

==== Week 2: vs. Minnesota Vikings ====
Week Two: Minnesota Vikings at Indianapolis Colts – Game summary

Quarter	1	2	3	4	Total
Vikings	3	3	0	14	20
Colts	7	10	3	3	23

at Lucas Oil Stadium, Indianapolis, Indiana

- Date: September 16
- Game time: 1:00 p.m. EDT
- Game weather: Sunny, 72 °F (22 °C) (retractable roof open)
- Game attendance: 63,192
- Referee: Don King
- TV announcers (Fox): Thom Brennaman, Brian Billick, and Laura Okmin

Game information

First quarter

- MIN – Blair Walsh 51-yard field goal, 7:48. Vikings 3–0. Drive: 12 plays, 20 yards, 7:12.
- IND – Dwayne Allen 3-yard pass from Andrew Luck (Adam Vinatieri kick), 0:49. Colts 7–3. Drive: 13 plays, 73 yards, 6:59.

Second quarter

- MIN – Blair Walsh 29-yard field goal, 11:38. Colts 7–6. Drive: 9 plays, 46 yards, 4:11.
- IND – Adam Vinatieri 26-yard field goal, 1:49. Colts 10–6. Drive: 9 plays, 40 yards, 4:13.
- IND – Reggie Wayne 30-yard pass from Andrew Luck (Adam Vinatieri kick), 0:07. Colts 17–6. Drive: 8 plays, 64 yards, 1:04.

Third quarter

- IND – Adam Vinatieri 45-yard field goal, 7:06. Colts 20–6. Drive: 14 plays, 56 yards, 7:54.

Fourth quarter

- MIN – Stephen Burton 7-yard pass from Christian Ponder (Blair Walsh kick), 5:07. Colts 20–13. Drive: 10 plays, 54 yards, 5:03.
- MIN – Kyle Rudolph 6-yard pass from Christian Ponder (Blair Walsh kick), 0:31. Tied 20–20. Drive: 9 plays, 46 yards, 2:19.
- IND – Adam Vinatieri 53-yard field goal, 0:08. Colts 23–20. Drive: 4 plays, 45 yards, 0:23.

Top passers

- MIN – Christian Ponder – 27/35, 245 yards, 2 TD
- IND – Andrew Luck – 20/31, 224 yards, 2 TD

Top rushers

- MIN – Adrian Peterson – 16 rushes, 60 yards
- IND – Donald Brown – 16 rushes, 46 yards

Top receivers

- MIN – Percy Harvin – 12 receptions, 104 yards
- IND – Donnie Avery – 9 receptions, 111 yards

After a tough loss to the Bears, the Colts returned home to take on the Vikings. The Vikes took the lead as Blair Walsh nailed a field goal from 51 yards out for a score of 3–0. However, the Colts made it 7–3 with Andrew Luck's 3-yard touchdown pass to Dwayne Allen. The Vikings came within a point as Blair Walsh kicked a 29-yard field goal for a 7–6 score. However, the Colts moved further ahead as Vinatieri scored a 26-yard field goal, followed by Andrew Luck's 30-yard touchdown pass to Reggie Wayne for leads of 10–6 and then 17–6 at halftime. In the 3rd quarter, the Colts increased their lead when Vinatieri scored a 45-yard field goal to make the score 20–6. However, in the fourth quarter the Vikings were able to score 2 straight touchdowns with Christian Ponder's 7-yard pass to Stephen Burton to make the score 20–13 and then a 6-yard pass to Kyle Rudolph to tie the game at 20–20. With 8 seconds left, the Colts drove down the field and wrapped the game up with Vinatieri 53-yard field goal for a final score of 23–20.

With the win, the Colts improved to 1–1 and remain undefeated at home against the Vikings as a franchise.

==== Week 3: vs. Jacksonville Jaguars ====
Week Three: Jacksonville Jaguars at Indianapolis Colts – Game summary

Quarter	1	2	3	4	Total
Jaguars	3	0	10	9	22
Colts	7	7	0	3	17

at Lucas Oil Stadium, Indianapolis, Indiana

- Date: September 23
- Game time: 1:00 p.m. EDT
- Game weather: Partly cloudy, 59 °F (15 °C) (retractable roof open)
- Game attendance: 63,536
- Referee: Donovan Briggans
- TV announcers (CBS): Bill Macatee and Steve Tasker

Game information

First quarter

- JAX – Josh Scobee 44-yard field goal, 7:13. Jaguars 3–0. Drive: 14 plays, 61 yards, 7:47.
- IND – T. Y. Hilton 40-yard pass from Andrew Luck (Adam Vinatieri kick), 3:42. Colts 7–3. Drive: 6 plays, 62 yards, 3:31.

Second quarter

- IND – Mewelde Moore 4-yard pass from Andrew Luck (Adam Vinatieri kick), 0:37. Colts 14–3. Drive: 14 plays, 80 yards, 4:53.

Third quarter

- JAX – Maurice Jones-Drew 59-yard run (Josh Scobee kick), 12:05. Colts 14–10. Drive: 1 play, 59 yards, 0:11.
- JAX – Josh Scobee 47-yard field goal, 2:55. Colts 14–13. Drive: 7 plays, 16 yards, 3:23.

Fourth quarter

- JAX – Josh Scobee 26-yard field goal, 11:02. Jaguars 16–14. Drive: 11 plays, 78 yards, 5:25.
- IND – Adam Vinatieri 37-yard field goal, 0:56. Colts 17–16. Drive: 5 plays, 48 yards, 0:37.
- JAX – Cecil Shorts 80-yard pass from Blaine Gabbert (run failed), 0:45. Jaguars 22–17. Drive: 1 play, 80 yards, 0:11.

Top passers

- JAX – Blaine Gabbert – 10/21, 155 yards, TD
- IND – Andrew Luck – 22/46, 313 yards, 2 TD, INT

Top rushers

- JAX – Maurice Jones-Drew – 28 rushes, 177 yards, TD
- IND – Donald Brown – 18 rushes, 62 yards

Top receivers

- JAX – Cecil Shorts – 1 reception, 80 yards, TD
- IND – T. Y. Hilton – 4 receptions, 113 yards, TD

After the tough home win over the Vikings, the Colts stayed home for a division rival duel against the Jaguars. Scoring started early as the Jags drew first blood scoring a 44-yard field goal from Josh Scobee to take a 3–0 lead. However, the Colts took the lead with Andrew Luck's 40-yard touchdown pass to T. Y. Hilton for a 7–3 lead. The Colts increased their lead in the 2nd quarter with Andrew Luck's 4-yard touchdown pass to Mewelde Moore for a 14–3 halftime lead. In the 3rd quarter, the Jaguars were able to fire back as Maurice Jones-Drew ran in a touchdown from 59 yards out to cut the lead to 14–10. Followed up quickly by Scobee's 47-yard field goal to shorten the lead to a point 14–13. In the fourth quarter, the Jags were able to take the lead with Scobee kicking a 26-yard field goal for a 16–14 lead. The Colts however retook the lead with Vinatieri's 37-yard field goal for a 17–16 lead. But then the Jags were able to complete the comeback attempt 11 seconds later with Blaine Gabbert's touchdown pass to Cecil Shorts III (with a failed 2-point conversion) to make the final score 22–17.

With the loss, the Colts went into their bye week at 1–2. It would also be their last loss to a division opponent at home until 2015.

==== Week 5: vs. Green Bay Packers ====
Week Five: Green Bay Packers at Indianapolis Colts – Game summary

Quarter	1	2	3	4	Total
Packers	7	14	0	6	27
Colts	0	3	16	11	30

at Lucas Oil Stadium, Indianapolis, Indiana

- Date: October 7
- Game time: 1:00 p.m. EDT
- Game weather: None (retractable roof closed)
- Game attendance: 67,020
- Referee: Walt Anderson
- TV announcers (Fox): Thom Brennaman, Brian Billick, and Laura Okmin

Game information

First quarter

- GB – John Kuhn 2-yard run (Mason Crosby kick), 2:07. Packers 7–0. Drive: 6 plays, 56 yards, 2:33.

Second quarter

- GB – James Jones 6-yard pass from Aaron Rodgers (Mason Crosby kick), 12:25. Packers 14–0. Drive: 8 plays, 62 yards, 2:46.
- IND – Adam Vinatieri 24-yard field goal, 6:21. Packers 14–3. Drive: 8 plays, 63 yards, 3:09.
- GB – Randall Cobb 31-yard pass from Aaron Rodgers (Mason Crosby kick), 4:21. Packers 21–3. Drive: 3 plays, 66 yards, 2:00.

Third quarter

- IND – Dwayne Allen 8-yard pass from Andrew Luck (Adam Vinatieri kick), 11:06. Packers 21–10. Drive: 5 plays, 39 yards, 2:13.
- IND – Adam Vinatieri 50-yard field goal, 7:42. Packers 21–13. Drive: 8 plays, 38 yards, 2:26.
- IND – Andrew Luck 3-yard run (pass failed), 0:18. Packers 21–19. Drive: 6 plays, 58 yards, 2:59.

Fourth quarter

- IND – Adam Vinatieri 28-yard field goal, 8:04. Colts 22–21. Drive: 8 plays, 66 yards, 3:23.
- GB – James Jones 8-yard pass from Aaron Rodgers (pass failed), 4:30. Packers 27–22. Drive: 2 plays, 49 yards, 0:14.
- IND – Reggie Wayne 4-yard pass from Andrew Luck (Donald Brown run), 0:35. Colts 30–27. Drive: 13 plays, 81 yards, 3:55.

Top passers

- GB – Aaron Rodgers – 20/32, 235 yards, 3 TD, INT
- IND – Andrew Luck – 31/55, 362 yards, 2 TD, INT

Top rushers

- GB – Alex Green – 10 rushes, 63 yards
- IND – Donald Brown – 17 rushes, 84 yards

Top receivers

- GB – Randall Cobb – 4 receptions, 82 yards, TD
- IND – Reggie Wayne – 13 receptions, 212 yards, TD

Coming off their bye week, the Colts stayed home for a duel against the Packers. Scoring got off to an early start as John Kuhn ran for a 2-yard touchdown to take a 7–0 lead. In the 2nd quarter, the Packers increased their lead with Aaron Rodgers's 6-yard touchdown pass to James Jones to make the score 14–0. After this, the Colts finally got on the board with Vinatieri's 24-yard field goal to make the score 14–3. However, the Packers pulled away as Aaron Rodgers connected with Randall Cobb for a 31-yard touchdown pass to take a 21–3 halftime lead. After the break, the Colts began to fire back As Andrew Luck connected with Dwayne Allen on an 8-yard touchdown pass, followed by Vinatieri's 50-yard field goal and then Luck's 3-yard rushing touchdown (with a failed 2-point conversion) to shorten the lead to 21–10, 21–13, and then 21–19. In the 4th quarter the Colts took the lead as Vinatieri kicked a 28-yard field goal for a 1-point lead 22–21. However, the Packers again retook the lead as Rodgers found Jones again for an 8-yard touchdown pass (with a failed 2-point conversion) and led 27–22. However, the Colts were able to capitalize the comeback victory with Luck's 4-yard touchdown pass to Reggie Wayne with the 2-point conversion successful and win the game 30–27. This game was rated #7 on the Top 20 NFL Games of 2012 on NFL.com, as Wayne's World. The Colts also improved their record to 4–0 against the Packers at home.

With the win, the Colts improved to 2–2.

==== Week 6: at New York Jets ====
Week Six: Indianapolis Colts at New York Jets – Game summary

Quarter	1	2	3	4	Total
Colts	3	3	0	3	9
Jets	0	21	7	7	35

at MetLife Stadium, East Rutherford, New Jersey

- Date: October 14
- Game time: 1:00 p.m.
- Game weather: Clear, 65 °F (18 °C)
- Game attendance: 79,088
- Referee: Bill Leavy
- TV announcers (CBS): Jim Nantz and Phil Simms

Game information

First quarter

- IND – Adam Vinatieri 20-yard field goal, 6:02. Colts 3–0. Drive: 6 plays, 54 yards, 3:13.

Second quarter

- NYJ – Stephen Hill 5-yard pass from Mark Sanchez (Nick Folk kick), 14:13. Jets 7–3. Drive: 14 plays, 71 yards, 6:49.
- NYJ – Shonn Greene 10-yard run (Nick Folk kick), 9:47. Jets 14–3. Drive: 5 plays, 35 yards, 3:04.
- IND – Adam Vinatieri 50-yard field goal, 6:06. Jets 14–6. Drive: 11 plays, -4 yards, 3:41.
- NYJ – Jason Hill 5-yard pass from Mark Sanchez (Nick Folk kick), 0:27. Jets 21–6. Drive: 11 plays, 70 yards, 5:39.

Third quarter

- NYJ – Shonn Greene 4-yard run (Nick Folk kick), 1:36. Jets 28–6. Drive: 7 plays, 91 yards, 3:54.

Fourth quarter

- IND – Adam Vinatieri 47-yard field goal, 14:40. Jets 28–9. Drive: 9 plays, 47 yards, 1:56.
- NYJ – Shonn Greene 2-yard run (Nick Folk kick), 1:05. Jets 35–9. Drive: 5 plays, 14 yards, 2:44.

Top passers

- IND – Andrew Luck – 22/44, 280 yards, 2 INT
- NYJ – Mark Sanchez – 11/18, 82 yards, 2 TD

Top rushers

- IND – Vick Ballard – 8 rushes, 25 yards
- NYJ – Shonn Greene – 32 rushes, 161 yards, 3 TD

Top receivers

- IND – Reggie Wayne – 5 receptions, 87 yards
- NYJ – Jeremy Kerley – 3 receptions, 24 yards

After their tough home win over the Packers, the Colts traveled to take on the Jets at Metlife Stadium. The Colts scoring took off in the first quarter with Adam Vinatieri's 20-yard field goal to take a 3–0 lead. However, the Jets took the lead in the 2nd quarter with Mark Sanchez looking up with Stephen Hill for a 5-yard touchdown pass for a 7–3 lead. They would later increase their lead with Shonn Greene's 10-yard run for a 14–3 lead. However, the Colts were able to draw closer with Vinatieri's 50-yard field goal to make the score 14–6. However, the Jets pulled away as Sanchez found Jason Hill on a 5-yard touchdown pass to make the score 21–6 at halftime. The Jets went back to work as Shonn Greene ran for a 4-yard touchdown to make the score 28–6. The Colts scored another field goal from Vinatieri from 47 yards out to make the score 28–9, however the Jets wrapped the game up with Shonn Greene's 2-yard touchdown run to make the final score 35–9.

With the huge loss, the Colts fell to 2–3 while rookie QB Andrew Luck would have his first career game without a single touchdown pass.

==== Week 7: vs. Cleveland Browns ====
Week Seven: Cleveland Browns at Indianapolis Colts – Game summary

Quarter	1	2	3	4	Total
Browns	0	6	7	0	13
Colts	7	7	3	0	17

at Lucas Oil Stadium, Indianapolis, Indiana

- Date: October 21
- Game time: 1:00 p.m. EDT
- Game weather: Sunny, 60 °F (16 °C) (retractable roof open)
- Game attendance: 64,560
- Referee: Carl Cheffers
- TV announcers (CBS): Kevin Harlan and Solomon Wilcots

Game information

First quarter

- IND – Andrew Luck 3-yard run (Adam Vinatieri kick), 7:23. Colts 7–0. Drive: 11 plays, 80 yards, 7:37.

Second quarter

- CLE – Greg Little 14-yard pass from Brandon Weeden (kick failed), 14:01. Colts 7–6. Drive: 16 plays, 78 yards, 8:22.
- IND – Andrew Luck 5-yard run (Adam Vinatieri kick), 7:41. Colts 14–6. Drive: 14 plays, 76 yards, 6:20.

Third quarter

- CLE – Josh Gordon 33-yard pass from Brandon Weeden (Phil Dawson kick), 11:53. Colts 14–13. Drive: 6 plays, 80 yards, 3:07.
- IND – Adam Vinatieri 38-yard field goal, 3:19. Colts 17–13. Drive: 17 plays, 61 yards, 8:34.

Fourth quarter

- No scoring plays

Top passers

- CLE – Brandon Weeden – 25/41, 264 yards, 2 TD
- IND – Andrew Luck – 16/29, 186 yards

Top rushers

- CLE – Montario Hardesty – 7 rushes, 28 yards
- IND – Vick Ballard – 20 rushes, 84 yards

Top receivers

- CLE – Josh Gordon – 2 receptions, 59 yards, TD
- IND – Reggie Wayne – 6 receptions, 73 yards

The Colts managed to recover from the blowout loss against the Jets and improved to 3–3 with the win.

==== Week 8: at Tennessee Titans ====
Week Eight: Indianapolis Colts at Tennessee Titans – Game summary

Quarter	1	2	3	4	OT	Total
Colts	3	0	3	7	6	19
Titans	3	7	0	3	0	13

at LP Field, Nashville, Tennessee

- Date: October 28
- Game time: 1:00 p.m. EDT/12:00 p.m. CDT
- Game weather: Sunny, 52 °F (11 °C)
- Game attendance: 69,143
- Referee: Alberto Riveron
- TV announcers (CBS): Bill Macatee and Steve Tasker

Game information

First quarter

- TEN – Rob Bironas 39-yard field goal, 7:35. Titans 3–0. Drive: 13 plays, 59 yards, 7:25.
- IND – Adam Vinatieri 20-yard field goal, 1:06. Tied 3–3. Drive: 12 plays, 83 yards, 6:29.

Second quarter

- TEN – Kendall Wright 23-yard pass from Matt Hasselbeck (Rob Bironas kick), 1:00. Titans 10–3. Drive: 12 plays, 72 yards, 6:28.

Third quarter

- IND – Adam Vinatieri 44-yard field goal, 10:20. Titans 10–6. Drive: 10 plays, 49 yards, 4:40.

Fourth quarter

- TEN – Rob Bironas 30-yard field goal, 10:26. Titans 13–6. Drive: 10 plays, 72 yards, 5:39.
- IND – Delone Carter 1-yard run (Adam Vinatieri kick), 3:24. Tied 13–13. Drive: 14 plays, 80 yards, 7:02.

Overtime

- IND – Vick Ballard 16-yard pass from Andrew Luck, 10:11. Colts 19–13. Drive: 9 plays, 76 yards, 4:49.

Top passers

- IND – Andrew Luck – 26/38, 297 yards, TD, INT
- TEN – Matt Hasselbeck – 22/29, 236 yards, TD

Top rushers

- IND – Donald Brown – 14 rushes, 80 yards
- TEN – Chris Johnson – 21 rushes, 99 yards

Top receivers

- IND – Reggie Wayne – 7 receptions, 91 yards
- TEN – Nate Washington – 5 receptions, 69 yards

With the overtime win, the Colts improved to 4–3.

==== Week 9: vs. Miami Dolphins ====
Week Nine: Miami Dolphins at Indianapolis Colts – Game summary

Quarter	1	2	3	4	Total
Dolphins	3	14	0	3	20
Colts	7	6	7	3	23

at Lucas Oil Stadium, Indianapolis, Indiana

- Date: November 4
- Game time: 1:00 p.m. EST
- Game weather: None (retractable roof closed)
- Game attendance: 66,479
- Referee: Tony Corrente
- TV announcers (CBS): Kevin Harlan and Solomon Wilcots

Game information

First quarter

- MIA – Dan Carpenter 37-yard field goal, 4:15. Dolphins 3–0. Drive: 11 plays, 42 yards, 5:19.
- IND – Reggie Wayne 9-yard pass from Andrew Luck (Adam Vinatieri kick), 0:47. Colts 7–3. Drive: 9 plays, 84 yards, 3:28.

Second quarter

- MIA – Charles Clay 31-yard pass from Ryan Tannehill (Dan Carpenter kick), 13:25. Dolphins 10–7. Drive: 5 plays, 81 yards, 2:22.
- IND – Adam Vinatieri 23-yard field goal, 9:37. Tied 10–10. Drive: 8 plays, 75 yards, 3:48.
- MIA – Reggie Bush 18-yard run (Dan Carpenter kick), 5:07. Dolphins 17–10. Drive: 9 plays, 62 yards, 4:30.
- IND – Adam Vinatieri 47-yard field goal, 0:07. Dolphins 17–13. Drive: 10 plays, 68 yards, 1:07.

Third quarter

- IND – T. Y. Hilton 36-yard pass from Andrew Luck (Adam Vinatieri kick), 1:49. Colts 20–17. Drive: 9 plays, 82 yards, 4:27.

Fourth quarter

- MIA – Dan Carpenter 31-yard field goal, 13:12. Tied 20–20. Drive: 10 plays, 52 yards, 3:37.
- IND – Adam Vinatieri 43-yard field goal, 5:58. Colts 23–20. Drive: 13 plays, 69 yards, 7:14.

Top passers

- MIA – Ryan Tannehill – 22/38, 290 yards, TD
- IND – Andrew Luck – 30/48, 433 yards, 2 TD

Top rushers

- MIA – Reggie Bush – 10 rushes, 41 yards, TD
- IND – Vick Ballard – 16 rushes, 60 yards

Top receivers

- MIA – Brian Hartline – 8 receptions, 107 yards
- IND – Donnie Avery – 5 receptions, 108 yards

In a close match of rookie quarterbacks, Andrew Luck barely outmatched Ryan Tannehill in a close win 23–20, with the win the Colts improved to 5–3. In the fourth quarter, referee Tony Corrente unintentionally screamed out obscenities on the microphone, causing announcer Kevin Harlan to apologize to television audiences.

==== Week 10: at Jacksonville Jaguars ====
Week Ten: Indianapolis Colts at Jacksonville Jaguars – Game summary

Quarter	1	2	3	4	Total
Colts	3	14	7	3	27
Jaguars	0	3	0	7	10

at Everbank Field, Jacksonville, Florida

- Date: November 8
- Game time: 8:20 p.m. EST
- Game weather: Clear, 50 °F (10 °C)
- Game attendance: 63,272
- Referee: Terry McAulay
- TV announcers (NFLN): Brad Nessler, Mike Mayock, and Alex Flanagan

Game information

First quarter

- IND – Adam Vinatieri 31-yard field goal, 7:27. Colts 3–0. Drive: 7 plays, 44 yards, 3:31.

Second quarter

- IND – Andrew Luck 5-yard run (Adam Vinatieri kick), 13:44. Colts 10–0. Drive: 8 plays, 62 yards, 4:30.
- IND – Andrew Luck 1-yard (Adam Vinatieri kick), 7:39. Colts 17–0. Drive: 7 plays, 61 yards, 3:43.
- JAX – Josh Scobee 40-yard field goal, 0:17. Colts 17–3. Drive: 9 plays, 49 yards, 1:31.

Third quarter

- IND – Darius Butler 11-yard interception return (Adam Vinatieri kick), 10:50. Colts 24–3.

Fourth quarter

- JAX – Cecil Shorts 4-yard pass from Chad Henne (Josh Scobee kick), 9:16. Colts 24–10. Drive: 14 plays, 61 yards, 5:36.
- IND – Adam Vinatieri 41-yard field goal, 3:23. Colts 27–10. Drive: 9 plays, 60 yards, 5:53.

Top passers

- IND – Andrew Luck – 18/26, 227 yards, INT
- JAX – Blaine Gabbert – 18/31, 209 yards, INT

Top rushers

- IND – Vick Ballard – 12 rushes, 48 yards
- JAX – Rashad Jennings – 11 rushes, 27 yards

Top receivers

- IND – Reggie Wayne – 8 receptions, 96 yards
- JAX – Cecil Shorts – 6 receptions, 105 yards, TD

==== Week 11: at New England Patriots ====
Week Eleven: Indianapolis Colts at New England Patriots – Game summary

Quarter	1	2	3	4	Total
Colts	14	3	0	7	24
Patriots	7	17	14	21	59

at Gillette Stadium, Foxborough, Massachusetts

- Date: November 18
- Game time: 4:25 p.m. EST
- Game weather: Clear, 42 °F (6 °C)
- Game attendance: 68,756
- Referee: John Parry
- TV announcers (CBS): Jim Nantz and Phil Simms

Game information

First quarter

- IND – Delone Carter 1-yard run (Adam Vinatieri kick), 10:49. Colts 7–0. Drive: 7 plays, 80 yards, 4:11.
- NE – Rob Gronkowski 4-yard pass from Tom Brady (Stephen Gostkowski kick), 7:07. Tied 7–7. Drive: 8 plays, 81 yards, 3:42.
- IND – T. Y. Hilton 14-yard pass from Andrew Luck (Adam Vinatieri kick), 1:44. Colts 14–7. Drive: 10 plays, 84 yards, 5:23.

Second quarter

- NE – Julian Edelman 68-yard punt return (Stephen Gostkowski kick), 12:00. Tied 14–14.
- NE – Aqib Talib 59-yard interception return (Stephen Gostkowski kick), 10:59. Patriots 21–14.
- IND – Adam Vinatieri 47-yard field goal, 5:46. Patriots 21–17. Drive: 12 plays, 52 yards, 5:13.
- NE – Stephen Gostkowski 31-yard field goal, 1:54. Patriots 24–17. Drive: 10 plays, 62 yards, 3:52.

Third quarter

- NE – Julian Edelman 2-yard pass from Tom Brady (Stephen Gostkowski kick), 11:07. Patriots 31–17. Drive: 10 plays, 76 yards, 3:53.
- NE – Rob Gronkowski 24-yard pass from Tom Brady (Stephen Gostkowski kick), 3:22. Patriots 38–17. Drive: 1 play, 24 yards, 0:06.

Fourth quarter

- NE – Alfonzo Dennard 87-yard interception return (Stephen Gostkowski kick), 14:47. Patriots 45–17.
- IND – T. Y. Hilton 43-yard pass from Andrew Luck (Adam Vinatieri kick), 12:32. Patriots 45–24. Drive: 5 plays, 74 yards, 2:15.
- NE – Stevan Ridley 3-yard run (Stephen Gostkowski kick), 9:05. Patriots 52–24. Drive: 7 plays, 80 yards, 3:27.
- NE – Shane Vereen 4-yard run (Stephen Gostkowski kick), 3:55. Patriots 59–24. Drive: 7 plays, 39 yards, 3:42.

Top passers

- IND – Andrew Luck – 27/50, 334 yards, 2 TD, 3 INT
- NE – Tom Brady – 24/35, 331 yards, 3 TD

Top rushers

- IND – Vick Ballard – 16 rushes, 42 yards
- NE – Julian Edelman – 1 rush, 42 yards

Top receivers

- IND – T. Y. Hilton – 6 receptions, 100 yards, 2 TD
- NE – Rob Gronkowski – 7 receptions, 137 yards, 2 TD

The Colts visited the Patriots and fell to 9–4 with the loss. It marked the first time since 1997 in which Peyton Manning was not on the team's roster in the season rivalry.

==== Week 12: vs. Buffalo Bills ====
Week Twelve: Buffalo Bills at Indianapolis Colts – Game summary

Quarter	1	2	3	4	Total
Bills	3	3	0	7	13
Colts	7	6	7	0	20

at Lucas Oil Stadium, Indianapolis, Indiana

- Date: November 25
- Game time: 1:00 p.m. EST
- Game weather: None (retractable roof closed)
- Game attendance: 64,366
- Referee: Ed Hochuli
- TV announcers (CBS): Marv Albert and Rich Gannon

Game information

First quarter

- IND – T. Y. Hilton 75-yard punt return (Adam Vinatieri kick), 9:56. Colts 7–0.
- BUF – Rian Lindell 33-yard field goal, 4:28. Colts 7–3. Drive: 11 plays, 65 yards, 5:28.

Second quarter

- IND – Adam Vinatieri 25-yard field goal, 4:08. Colts 10–3. Drive: 12 plays, 82 yards, 6:03.
- BUF – Rian Lindell 31-yard field goal, 2:16. Colts 10–6. Drive: 5 plays, 67 yards, 1:52.
- IND – Adam Vinatieri 19-yard field goal, 0:00. Colts 13–6. Drive: 5 plays, 50 yards, 0:32.

Third quarter

- IND – T. Y. Hilton 8-yard pass from Andrew Luck (Adam Vinatieri kick), 4:02. Colts 20–6. Drive: 15 plays, 82 yards, 8:04.

Fourth quarter

- BUF – Lee Smith 1-yard pass from Ryan Fitzpatrick (Rian Lindell kick), 11:30. Colts 20–13. Drive: 8 plays, 78 yards, 4:36.

Top passers

- BUF – Ryan Fitzpatrick – 17/33, 180 yards, TD, INT
- IND – Andrew Luck – 20/37, 240 yards, TD, INT

Top rushers

- BUF – C. J. Spiller – 14 rushes, 107 yards
- IND – Vick Ballard – 13 rushes, 41 yards

Top receivers

- BUF – Stevie Johnson – 6 receptions, 106 yards
- IND – Reggie Wayne – 8 receptions, 102 yards

==== Week 13: at Detroit Lions ====
Week Thirteen: Indianapolis Colts at Detroit Lions – Game summary

Quarter	1	2	3	4	Total
Colts	7	7	7	14	35
Lions	10	13	7	3	33

at Ford Field, Detroit, Michigan

- Date: December 2
- Game time: 1:00 p.m. EST
- Game weather: None (played indoors)
- Game attendance: 63,887
- Referee: Bill Vinovich
- TV announcers (CBS): Ian Eagle and Dan Fouts

Game information

First quarter

- DET – Jason Hanson 48-yard field goal, 8:49. Lions 3–0. Drive: 7 plays, 29 yards, 3:45.
- IND – Donnie Avery 17-yard pass from Andrew Luck (Adam Vinatieri kick), 6:29. Colts 7–3. Drive: 6 plays, 80 yards, 2:20.
- DET – Brandon Pettigrew 16-yard pass from Matthew Stafford (Jason Hanson kick), 1:48. Lions 10–7. Drive: 8 plays, 87 yards, 4:41.

Second quarter

- DET – Mikel Leshoure 6-yard run (Jason Hanson kick), 11:27. Lions 17–7. Drive: 8 plays, 75 yards, 3:50.
- IND – Coby Fleener 26-yard pass from Andrew Luck (Adam Vinatieri kick), 9:47. Lions 17–14. Drive: 3 plays, 80 yards, 1:40.
- DET – Jason Hanson 33-yard field goal, 7:17. Lions 20–14. Drive: 4 plays, 5 yards, 0:59.
- DET – Jason Hanson 52-yard field goal, 3:46. Lions 23–14. Drive: 7 plays, 31 yards, 2:29.

Third quarter

- IND – Vick Ballard 11-yard run (Adam Vinatieri kick), 12:05. Lions 23–21. Drive: 7 plays, 80 yards, 2:55.
- DET – Calvin Johnson 46-yard pass from Matthew Stafford (Jason Hanson kick), 0:02. Lions 30–21. Drive: 6 plays, 60 yards, 3:54.

Fourth quarter

- DET – Jason Hanson 31-yard field goal, 8:41. Lions 33–21. Drive: 5 plays, 57 yards, 2:09.
- IND – LaVon Brazill 42-yard pass from Andrew Luck (Adam Vinatieri kick), 2:39. Lions 33–28. Drive: 8 plays, 77 yards, 1:23.
- IND – Donnie Avery 14-yard pass from Andrew Luck (Adam Vinatieri kick), 0:00. Colts 35–33. Drive: 11 plays, 76 yards, 1:07.

Top passers

- IND – Andrew Luck – 24/54, 391 yards, 4 TD, 3 INT
- DET – Matthew Stafford – 27/46, 313 yards, 2 TD, INT

Top rushers

- IND – Vick Ballard – 9 rushes, 41 yards, TD
- DET – Joique Bell – 7 rushes, 81 yards

Top receivers

- IND – T. Y. Hilton – 6 receptions, 100 yards
- DET – Calvin Johnson – 13 receptions, 171 yards, TD

==== Week 14: vs. Tennessee Titans ====
Week Fourteen: Tennessee Titans at Indianapolis Colts – Game summary

Quarter	1	2	3	4	Total
Titans	7	13	0	3	23
Colts	7	0	14	6	27

at Lucas Oil Stadium, Indianapolis, Indiana

- Date: December 9
- Game time: 1:00 p.m. EST
- Game weather: None (retractable roof closed)
- Game attendance: 64,688
- Referee: Pete Morelli
- TV announcers (CBS): Ian Eagle and Dan Fouts

Game information

First quarter

- TEN – Jared Cook 18-yard pass from Jake Locker (Rob Bironas kick), 10:10. Titans 7–0. Drive: 9 plays, 80 yards, 4:50.
- IND – Reggie Wayne 4-yard pass from Andrew Luck (Adam Vinatieri kick), 1:01. Tied 7–7. Drive: 7 plays, 53 yards, 4:11.

Second quarter

- TEN – Rob Bironas 40-yard field goal, 12:27. Titans 10–7. Drive: 8 plays, 58 yards, 3:34.
- TEN – Will Witherspoon 40-yard interception return (Rob Bironas kick), 4:40. Titans 17–7.
- TEN – Rob Bironas 31-yard field goal, 0:37. Titans 20–7. Drive: 9 plays, 72 yards, 1:14.

Third quarter

- IND – Delone Carter 1-yard run (Adam Vinatieri kick), 8:36. Titans 20–14. Drive: 14 plays, 80 yards, 6:24.
- IND – Cassius Vaughn 3-yard interception return (Adam Vinatieri kick), 5:36. Colts 21–20.

Fourth quarter

- TEN – Rob Bironas 25-yard field goal, 10:28. Titans 23–21. Drive: 16 plays, 72 yards, 10:08.
- IND – Adam Vinatieri 53-yard field goal, 6:23. Colts 24–23. Drive: 10 plays, 48 yards, 4:05.
- IND – Adam Vinatieri 40-yard field goal, 3:48. Colts 27–23. Drive: 4 plays, 6 yards, 1:44.

Top passers

- TEN – Jake Locker – 22/35, 262 yards, TD, 2 INT
- IND – Andrew Luck – 16/34, 196 yards, TD, 2 INT

Top rushers

- TEN – Jake Locker – 4 rushes, 51 yards
- IND – Vick Ballard – 19 rushes, 94 yards

Top receivers

- TEN – Kenny Britt – 8 receptions, 143 yards
- IND – Reggie Wayne – 6 receptions, 64 yards, TD

==== Week 15: at Houston Texans ====
Week Fifteen: Indianapolis Colts at Houston Texans – Game summary

Quarter	1	2	3	4	Total
Colts	0	10	7	0	17
Texans	10	10	3	6	29

at Reliant Stadium, Houston, Texas

- Date: December 16
- Game time: 1:00 p.m. EST/12:00 p.m. CST
- Game weather: None (retractable roof closed)
- Game attendance: 71,702
- Referee: Jeff Triplette
- TV announcers (CBS): Ian Eagle and Dan Fouts

Game information

First quarter

- HOU – Shayne Graham 29-yard field goal, 11:47. Texans 3–0. Drive: 6 plays, 69 yards, 3:13.
- HOU – Andre Johnson 3-yard pass from Matt Schaub (Shayne Graham kick), 4:51. Texans 10–0. Drive: 13 plays, 57 yards, 5:44.

Second quarter

- IND – Adam Vinatieri 26-yard field goal, 6:12. Texans 10–3. Drive: 7 plays, 26 yards, 2:10.
- HOU – Shayne Graham 35-yard field goal, 3:50. Texans 13–3. Drive: 7 plays, 27 yards, 2:22.
- HOU – Bryan Braman 8-yard blocked punt return (Shayne Graham kick), 1:46. Texans 20–3.
- IND – T. Y. Hilton 61-yard pass from Andrew Luck (Adam Vinatieri kick), 1:07. Texans 20–10. Drive: 2 plays, 74 yards, 0:39.

Third quarter

- HOU – Shayne Graham 27-yard field goal, 7:33. Texans 23–10. Drive: 11 plays, 78 yards, 6:20.
- IND – Dwayne Allen 8-yard pass from Andrew Luck (Adam Vinatieri kick), 2:32. Texans 23–17. Drive: 8 plays, 80 yards, 5:01.

Fourth quarter

- HOU – Shayne Graham 46-yard field goal, 8:30. Texans 26–17. Drive: 7 plays, 11 yards, 3:24.
- HOU – Shayne Graham 33-yard field goal, 1:05. Texans 29–17. Drive: 9 plays, 78 yards, 3:40.

Top passers

- IND – Andrew Luck – 13/27, 186 yards, 2 TD
- HOU – Matt Schaub – 23/31, 261 yards, TD

Top rushers

- IND – Vick Ballard – 18 rushes, 105 yards
- HOU – Arian Foster – 27 rushes, 165 yards

Top receivers

- IND – T. Y. Hilton – 3 receptions, 78 yards, TD
- HOU – Andre Johnson – 11 receptions, 151 yards, TD

This was Indianapolis' last loss to a divisional opponent until 2015.

==== Week 16: at Kansas City Chiefs ====
Week Sixteen: Indianapolis Colts at Kansas City Chiefs – Game summary

Quarter	1	2	3	4	Total
Colts	7	6	0	7	20
Chiefs	3	0	10	0	13

at Arrowhead Stadium, Kansas City, Missouri

- Date: December 23
- Game time: 1:00 p.m. EST/12:00 p.m. CST
- Game weather: Sunny, 25 °F (−4 °C)
- Game attendance: 62,938
- Referee: Ron Winter
- TV announcers (CBS): Bill Macatee and Steve Tasker

Game information

First quarter

- IND – Darius Butler 32-yard interception return (Adam Vinatieri kick), 10:08. Colts 7–0.
- KC – Ryan Succop 47-yard field goal, 8:18. Colts 7–3. Drive: 6 plays, 51 yards, 1:50.

Second quarter

- IND – Adam Vinatieri 48-yard field goal, 13:27. Colts 10–3. Drive: 7 plays, 37 yards, 2:14.
- IND – Adam Vinatieri 36-yard field goal, 0:07. Colts 13–3. Drive: 7 plays, 60 yards, 0:55.

Third quarter

- KC – Jamaal Charles 86-yard run (Ryan Succop kick), 14:40. Colts 13–10. Drive: 1 play, 86 yards, 0:15.
- KC – Ryan Succop 47-yard field goal, 6:00. Tied 13–13. Drive: 8 plays, 52 yards, 4:02.

Fourth quarter

- IND – Reggie Wayne 7-yard pass from Andrew Luck (Adam Vinatieri kick), 4:08. Colts 20–13. Drive: 13 plays, 73 yards, 6:05.

Top passers

- IND – Andrew Luck – 17/35, 205 yards, TD
- KC – Brady Quinn – 10/22, 162 yards, 2 INT

Top rushers

- IND – Vick Ballard – 20 rushes, 69 yards
- KC – Jamaal Charles – 22 rushes, 226 yards, TD

Top receivers

- IND – Reggie Wayne – 5 receptions, 81 yards, TD
- KC – Jonathan Baldwin – 2 receptions, 64 yards

==== Week 17: vs. Houston Texans ====
Week Seventeen: Houston Texans at Indianapolis Colts – Game summary

Quarter	1	2	3	4	Total
Texans	3	3	10	0	16
Colts	7	7	7	7	28

at Lucas Oil Stadium, Indianapolis, Indiana

- Date: December 30
- Game time: 1:00 p.m. EST
- Game weather: None (retractable roof closed)
- Game attendance: 66,957
- Referee: Clete Blakeman
- TV announcers (CBS): Greg Gumbel and Dan Dierdorf

Game information

First quarter

- IND – Coby Fleener 1-yard pass from Andrew Luck (Adam Vinatieri kick), 7:51. Colts 7–0. Drive: 13 plays, 75 yards, 7:09.
- HOU – Shayne Graham 51-yard field goal, 0:06. Colts 7–3. Drive: 14 plays, 48 yards, 7:45.

Second quarter

- HOU – Shayne Graham 37-yard field goal, 10:22. Colts 7–6. Drive: 5 plays, 44 yards, 2:28.
- IND – Vick Ballard 1-yard run (Adam Vinatieri kick), 2:00. Colts 14–6. Drive: 6 plays, 39 yards, 2:05.

Third quarter

- HOU – Arian Foster 13-yard run (Shayne Graham kick), 9:25. Colts 14–13. Drive: 12 plays, 84 yards, 5:35.
- HOU – Shayne Graham 37-yard field goal, 5:22. Texans 16–14. Drive: 7 plays, 55 yards, 2:28.
- IND – Deji Karim 101-yard kickoff return (Adam Vinatieri kick), 5:10. Colts 21–16.

Fourth quarter

- IND – T. Y. Hilton 70-yard pass from Andrew Luck (Adam Vinatieri kick), 11:22. Colts 28–16. Drive: 3 plays, 57 yards, 1:51.

Top passers

- HOU – Matt Schaub – 24/36, 275 yards, 2 INT
- IND – Andrew Luck – 14/28, 191 yards, 2 TD

Top rushers

- HOU – Arian Foster – 16 rushes, 96 yards, TD
- IND – Vick Ballard – 27 rushes, 78 yards, TD

Top receivers

- HOU – Andre Johnson – 12 receptions, 141 yards
- IND – T. Y. Hilton – 4 receptions, 111 yards, TD

With the win, the Colts finished the season 11-5 and 2nd place in the AFC South. Good enough for the fifth seed, first wild card in the AFC playoffs. Also, they would improve to 11–0 against the Texans at home. The Colts also improved from their 2–14 record from 2011.

== Standings ==
AFC South
	W	L	T	PCT	DIV	CONF	PF	PA	STK
^{(3)} Houston Texans	12	4	0	.750	5–1	10–2	416	331	L2
^{(5)} Indianapolis Colts	11	5	0	.688	4–2	8–4	357	387	W2
Tennessee Titans	6	10	0	.375	1–5	5–7	330	471	W1
Jacksonville Jaguars	2	14	0	.125	2–4	2–10	255	444	L5

== Postseason ==
=== Schedule ===
Round	Date	Opponent (seed)	Result	Record	Venue	Recap
Wild Card	January 6	at Baltimore Ravens (4)	L 9–24	0–1	M&T Bank Stadium	Recap

=== Game summaries ===
==== AFC Wild Card Playoffs: at (4) Baltimore Ravens ====
AFC Wild Card Playoffs: (5) Indianapolis Colts at (4) Baltimore Ravens – Game summary

Quarter	1	2	3	4	Total
Colts	0	6	3	0	9
Ravens	0	10	7	7	24

at M&T Bank Stadium, Baltimore, Maryland

- Date: January 6, 2013
- Game time: 1:00 p.m. EST
- Game weather: Partly cloudy, 49 °F (9 °C)
- Game attendance: 71,379
- Referee: Mike Carey
- TV announcers (CBS): Jim Nantz and Phil Simms

Game information

First quarter

- No scoring plays

Second quarter

- BAL – Justin Tucker 23-yard field goal, 11:18. Ravens 3–0. Drive: 10 plays, 66 yards, 3:56.
- IND – Adam Vinatieri 47-yard field goal, 2:25. Tied 3–3. Drive: 10 plays, 51 yards, 5:44.
- BAL – Vonta Leach 2-yard run (Justin Tucker kick), 0:50. Ravens 10–3. Drive: 6 plays, 63 yards, 1:35.
- IND – Adam Vinatieri 52-yard field goal, 0:00. Ravens 10–6. Drive: 7 plays, 53 yards, 0:50.

Third quarter

- BAL – Dennis Pitta 20-yard pass from Joe Flacco (Justin Tucker kick), 8:26. Ravens 17–6. Drive: 5 plays, 75 yards, 1:23.
- IND – Adam Vinatieri 26-yard field goal, 0:40. Ravens 17–9. Drive: 15 plays, 72 yards, 7:46.

Fourth quarter

- BAL – Anquan Boldin 18-yard pass from Joe Flacco (Justin Tucker kick), 9:14. Ravens 24–9. Drive: 5 plays, 70 yards, 2:30.

Top passers

- IND – Andrew Luck – 28/54, 288 yards, INT
- BAL – Joe Flacco – 12/23, 282 yards, 2 TD

Top rushers

- IND – Vick Ballard – 22 rushes, 91 yards
- BAL – Bernard Pierce – 13 rushes, 103 yards

Top receivers

- IND – Reggie Wayne – 9 receptions, 114 yards
- BAL – Anquan Boldin – 5 receptions, 145 yards, TD
