= Coby Fleener =

American football player (born 1988)

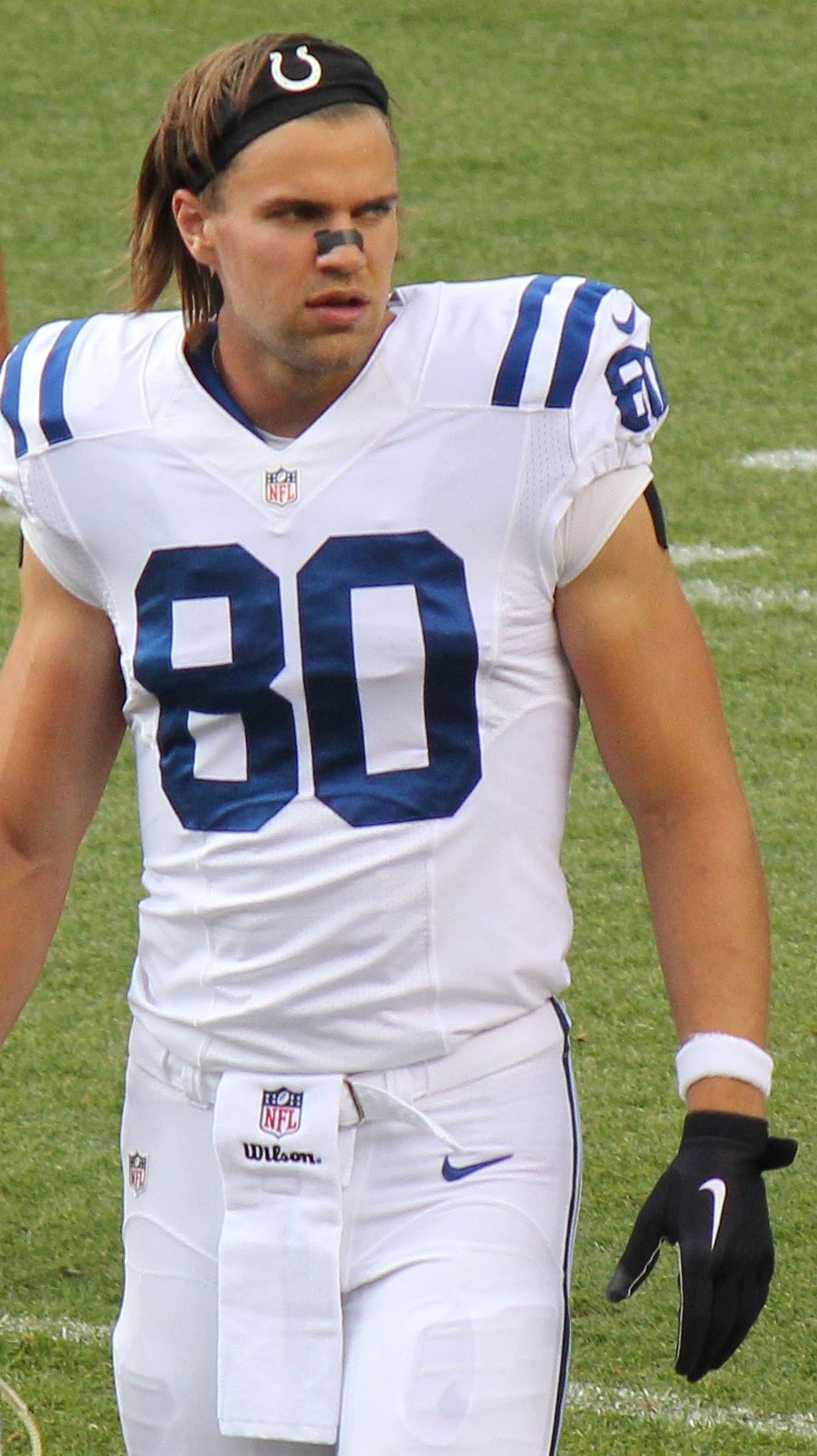
- Fleener with the Indianapolis Colts in 2014

No. 80, 82
- Position: Tight end

Personal information
- Born: September 20, 1988 (age 38); Lemont, Illinois, U.S.
- Listed height: 6 ft 6 in (1.98 m)
- Listed weight: 251 lb (114 kg)

Career information
- High school: Joliet Catholic (Joliet, Illinois)
- College: Stanford (2007–2011)
- NFL draft: 2012: 2nd round, 34th overall pick

Career history
- Indianapolis Colts (2012–2015); New Orleans Saints (2016–2017)

Awards and highlights
- First-team All-American (2011); First-team All-Pac-12 (2011); Second-team All-Pac-10 (2010)

Career NFL statistics
- Receptions: 255
- Receiving yards: 3,080
- Receiving average: 12.1
- Receiving touchdowns: 22
- Stats at Pro Football Reference

Jacoby Fleener (born September 20, 1988) is an American former professional football player who was a tight end in the National Football League (NFL). He played college football for the Stanford Cardinal, earning first-team All-American honors in 2011. Fleener was selected by the Indianapolis Colts in the second round of the 2012 NFL draft. He also played for the New Orleans Saints.

== Early life ==
Jacoby Fleener was born on September 20, 1988, in Lemont, Illinois. He played high school football at Joliet Catholic Academy in Joliet, Illinois.

== College career ==
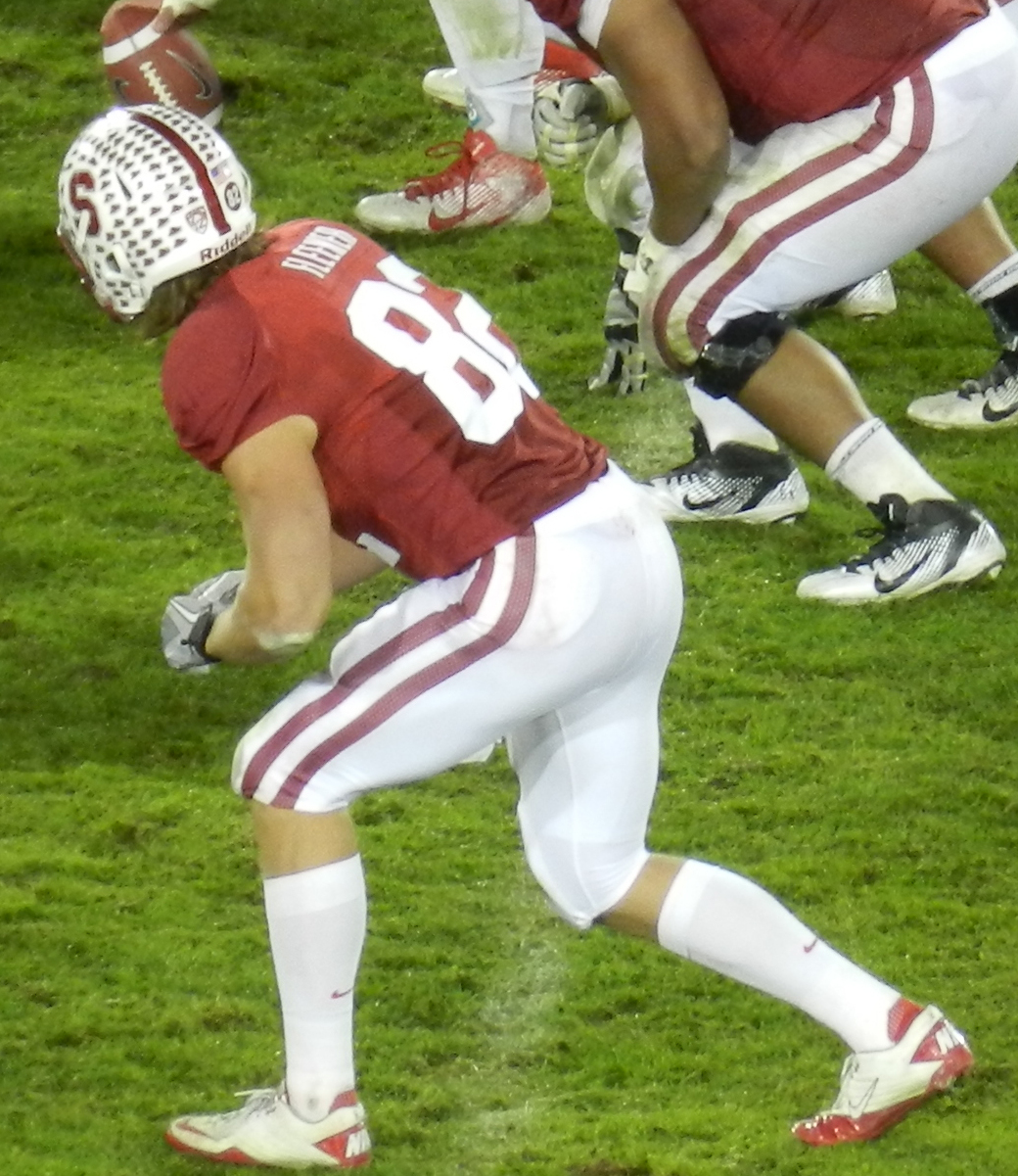
Fleener with the Stanford Cardinal in 2011

Fleener played college football at Stanford University for the Cardinal from 2008 to 2011. In the 2010 season, Fleener had six receptions for 173 yards and three touchdowns in a 40–12 victory over Virginia Tech in the Orange Bowl. In the 2011 season, his 19.6 yards per reception led the Pac-12. In his collegiate career, he recorded 96 receptions for 1,543 yards and 18 touchdowns. He was named an All-American by CBSSports.com as a senior in 2011.

== Professional career ==
=== Pre-draft ===
Pre-draft measurables
Height	Weight	Arm length	Hand span	Wingspan	40-yard dash	10-yard split	20-yard split	20-yard shuttle	Three-cone drill	Vertical jump	Broad jump	Bench press
6 ft 6 in (1.98 m)	247 lb (112 kg)	33 3/8 in (0.85 m)	10 in (0.25 m)	6 ft 7 1/4 in (2.01 m)	4.51 s	1.56 s	2.65 s	4.30 s	7.02 s	37 in (0.94 m)	9 ft 8 in (2.95 m)	27 reps
All values from NFL Combine/Pro Day

Fleener was considered a top tight end prospect for the 2012 NFL draft. At the NFL Combine, he benched 27 reps of 225 at 6–6 247, though he did not run because of an ankle injury.

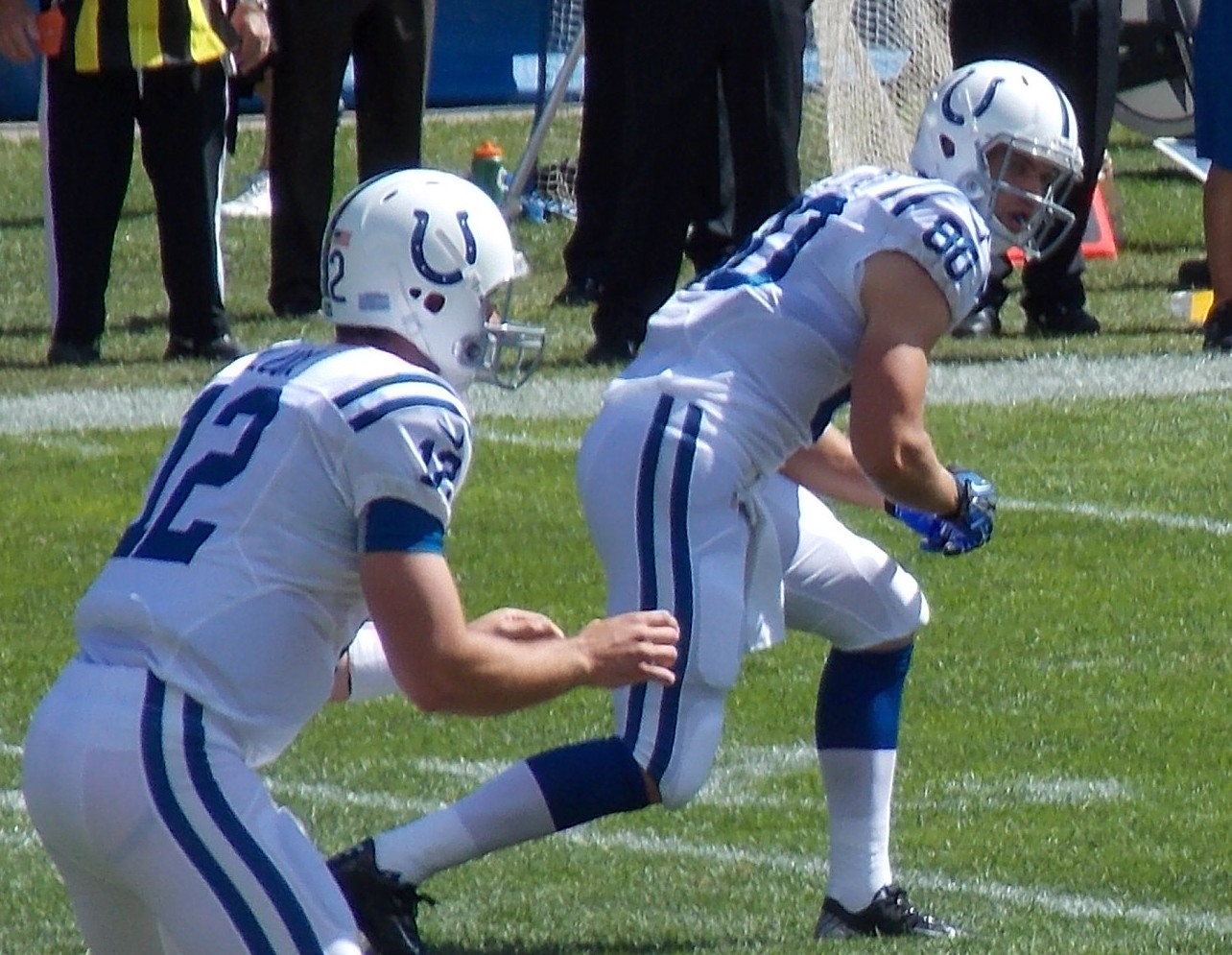
Fleener (right) and quarterback Andrew Luck (left) in their NFL debuts in 2012.

=== Indianapolis Colts ===
The Indianapolis Colts selected Fleener in the second round with the 34th overall pick in the 2012 NFL draft after drafting his college quarterback, Andrew Luck, with the first overall pick. Fleener was the first tight end drafted in the 2012 NFL draft. On July 25, he and the Colts agreed to a four-year contract worth $5.431 million.

Fleener made his regular season debut in Week 1 against the Chicago Bears, recording six receptions for 82 yards. He struggled through the early season, before recording his first career touchdown reception against the Detroit Lions in Week 13. Fleener finished the 2012 regular season with 26 receptions for 281 yards and two touchdowns.

Fleener began the 2013 preseason as the backup to Dwayne Allen. He missed the final two weeks of preseason after suffering a knee injury. Allen would be placed on injured reserve after Week 1, making Fleener the starter for the rest of the season. He recorded his first career 100-yard receiving game in Week 11 against the Tennessee Titans, making eight receptions for 107 yards. Fleener finished the 2013 season with 52 receptions for 608 yards and four touchdowns. In the Colts' Wild Card Round playoff game against the Kansas City Chiefs, he had five receptions for 46 yards and a touchdown to assist in the Colts' 45–44 comeback win.

In Week 11 of the 2014 season, Fleener had seven receptions for 144 receiving yards against the New England Patriots. In Week 13 against Washington, he had four receptions for 127 yards and two touchdowns in the 49–27 victory. In the final game of the regular season, Fleener had two receiving touchdowns in a 27–10 victory over the Tennessee Titans. In the 2014 season, Fleener had 51 receptions for 774 receiving yards and eight receiving touchdowns.

In the 2015 season, Fleener had 54 receptions for 491 receiving yards and three receiving touchdowns.

=== New Orleans Saints ===
On March 9, 2016, Fleener signed a five-year, $36 million contract with the New Orleans Saints. He finished the 2016 season with 50 receptions for 631 yards and three touchdowns. In addition, Fleener scored his first career rushing touchdown, on his first career rushing attempt, in a Week 6 victory over the Carolina Panthers.

Fleener started the 2017 season with consecutive games with a touchdown against the Minnesota Vikings and the New England Patriots. He was placed on injured reserve on December 2, after suffering a concussion in Week 12. In the 2017 season, Fleener finished with 22 receptions for 295 receiving yards and two receiving touchdowns in 11 games and one start. On May 7, 2018, Fleener was released by the Saints.

== Career statistics ==
=== NFL ===
Year	Team	Games		Receiving					Rushing					Fumbles	
Year	Team	GP	GS	Rec	Yds	Avg	Lng	TD	Att	Yds	Avg	Lng	TD	Fum	Lost
2012	IND	12	10	26	281	10.8	26T	2	—	—	—	—	—	0	0
2013	IND	16	12	52	608	11.7	44	4	—	—	—	—	—	1	0
2014	IND	16	12	51	774	15.2	73T	8	—	—	—	—	—	0	0
2015	IND	16	11	54	491	9.1	57T	3	—	—	—	—	—	0	0
2016	NO	16	8	50	631	12.6	50T	3	1	2	2.0	2T	1	2	0
2017	NO	11	1	22	295	13.4	33	2	—	—	—	—	—	0	0
Total		87	54	255	3,080	12.1	73	22	1	2	2.0	2	1	3	0

=== Postseason ===
Year	Team	Games		Receiving					Rushing					Fumbles	
Year	Team	GP	GS	Rec	Yds	Avg	Lng	TD	Att	Yds	Avg	Lng	TD	fum	Lost
2012	IND	1	1	3	25	8.3	12	0	—	—	—	—	—	0	0
2013	IND	2	2	11	120	10.9	29	1	—	—	—	—	—	0	0
2014	IND	3	3	7	97	13.9	32	0	—	—	—	—	—	0	0
Total		6	6	21	242	11.5	32	1	0	0	0.0	0	0	0	0

=== College ===
Year	School	Receiving			
Year	School	Rec	Yds	Avg	TD
2008	Stanford	13	176	13.5	0
2009	Stanford	21	266	12.7	1
2010	Stanford	28	434	15.5	7
2011	Stanford	34	667	19.6	10
Career		96	1,543	16.1	18
