= John Pagano =

American football coach (born 1967)

Washington Commanders
- Title: Outside linebackers coach

Personal information
- Born: March 30, 1967 (age 59); Boulder, Colorado, U.S.

Career information
- Position: Linebacker
- High school: Fairview (Boulder)
- College: Colorado Mesa (1985–1988)

Career history
- Mesa State Mavericks (1989) Assistant coach; UNLV Rebels (1990–1991) Graduate assistant; Overland HS (1992–1993) Assistant coach; Louisiana Tech Bulldogs (1994) Graduate assistant; Ole Miss Rebels (1995) Graduate assistant; New Orleans Saints (1996–1997) Defensive assistant; Indianapolis Colts (1998–2001) Defensive assistant; San Diego Chargers (2002–2016); Defensive assistant & defensive quality control coach (2002); Assistant linebackers coach (2003); Outside linebackers coach (2004); Linebackers coach (2005–2011); Defensive coordinator (2012–2016); Oakland Raiders (2017) Assistant head coach - defense; Houston Texans (2018–2019) Senior defensive assistant & outside linebackers coach; Denver Broncos (2020–2021) Outside linebackers coach; Washington Commanders (2024–present); Senior defensive assistant (2024–2025); Outside linebackers coach (2026–present)
- Coaching profile at Pro Football Reference

John Pagano (born March 30, 1967) is an American professional football coach who is the outside linebackers coach for the Washington Commanders of the National Football League (NFL). A longtime assistant coach with the San Diego Chargers, Pagano also coached for the Houston Texans, Oakland Raiders, Indianapolis Colts, New Orleans Saints, and Denver Broncos. He is the younger brother of former coach Chuck Pagano.

== Early life ==
Pagano was born on March 30, 1967, in Boulder, Colorado. An all-state linebacker at Fairview High School, he played at Colorado Mesa University from 1985 to 1988, earning a degree in business marketing.

== Coaching career ==
=== San Diego Chargers ===
Pagano originally joined the Chargers in 2002 as the team's quality control coach for the defense and moved his way up the ranks, first as an assistant linebackers coach, then as the outside linebackers coach and linebackers coach before being promoted to defensive coordinator on January 5, 2012.

Since Pagano first started working with the team's linebackers in 2005, a player from that group led the team in tackles and sacks every season, including Shaun Phillips who paced the squad in 2012 with 9.5. Pagano also worked closely with Shawne Merriman, who led the NFL in sacks in 2006, was selected to play in three Pro Bowls and won the NFL's Defensive Rookie of the Year Award in 2005.

In Pagano's first year as a coordinator, the Chargers scored a total of seven defensive touchdowns in 2012, second in the NFL to the Chicago Bears (12), and two shy of the team record set by the 1961 squad that returned nine interceptions for touchdowns. The 2012 Chargers returned five interceptions and two fumbles for scores. The Chargers also increased their sack total, going from 32 in 2011 to 38 in 2012, including a team-record-tying 11-sack performance in a Dec 23 win against the New York Jets.

=== Oakland Raiders ===
On January 23, 2017, Pagano was hired as assistant head coach - defense for the Oakland Raiders. On November 21, 2017, following the termination of defensive coordinator Ken Norton Jr., Pagano was given defensive play-calling duties for the remainder of the season by head coach Jack Del Rio. Despite marked improvement in the defense’s performance under Pagano, he was not retained by new head coach Jon Gruden in 2018.

=== Houston Texans ===
On January 26, 2018, Pagano was hired as a senior defensive assistant and outside linebackers coach for the Houston Texans. He was dismissed on January 18, 2020.

=== Denver Broncos ===
On January 30, 2020, Pagano was hired as an outside linebackers coach for the Denver Broncos. He was fired by new head coach Nathaniel Hackett on February 8, 2022.

=== Washington Commanders ===
On February 15, 2024, Pagano was hired by the Washington Commanders as a senior defensive assistant. He was promoted to outside linebackers coach in February 2026.

== Personal life ==
His older brother, Chuck Pagano, is the former head coach of the Indianapolis Colts. The Pagano brothers both played for their father, Sam, who spent 26 years as the head coach at Fairview High. Pagano's nephew, Carlo Kemp, played for the Pittsburgh Maulers of the United States Football League.
