= Vick Ballard =

American football player (born 1990)

No. 33
- Position: Running back

Personal information
- Born: July 16, 1990 (age 36); Pascagoula, Mississippi, U.S.
- Listed height: 5 ft 10 in (1.78 m)
- Listed weight: 224 lb (102 kg)

Career information
- High school: Pascagoula (MS)
- College: Mississippi Gulf Coast CC (2008–2009); Mississippi State (2010–2011)
- NFL draft: 2012: 5th round, 170th overall pick

Career history
- Indianapolis Colts (2012–2015); New Orleans Saints (2016)*
- * Offseason or practice squad member only

Awards and highlights
- Second-team All-SEC (2011); 2011 Music City Bowl MVP

Career NFL statistics
- Rushing attempts: 224
- Rushing yards: 877
- Rushing touchdowns: 2
- Receptions: 18
- Receiving yards: 147
- Receiving touchdowns: 1
- Stats at Pro Football Reference

Vick Ballard (born July 16, 1990) is an American former professional football player who was a running back in the National Football League (NFL). He played college football at Mississippi State, and was selected by the Indianapolis Colts 170th overall in the 2012 NFL draft. In his post-football life, he is an aeronautical engineer for Lockheed Martin.

== College career ==
Ballard attended Mississippi Gulf Coast Community College in 2008 and 2009. Prior to 2010, he transferred to Mississippi State University. In his two years at Mississippi State, he rushed for 2,157 yards on 379 carries and 29 touchdowns. He was named NCJAA 1st Team All-American.

Despite playing only two seasons, he is third on the Mississippi State career rushing touchdowns list, and his 19 touchdowns in 2010 are a school single-season record.

== Professional career ==
=== Indianapolis Colts ===
During the NFL Scouting Combine, Ballard tripped during the 40 yard dash and ran into the timer. On his second attempt, Ballard ran a 4.65 time, ranking 16th out of the 25 running backs.

Ballard was drafted in the fifth round by the Indianapolis Colts on April 28, 2012. His first game as a starting running back was played October 14, against the New York Jets. On October 28, he caught a pass from Andrew Luck and took it 16 yards for his first career touchdown. Ballard, under pressure from several defensive players, leapt and corkscrewed in mid air as he crossed the goal line. Ballard's score was the game winner in overtime against the Tennessee Titans. On December 16, Ballard rushed for a career–high 105 yards on 18 carries in a loss to the Houston Texans.

On September 13, 2013, head coach Chuck Pagano confirmed Ballard was placed on injured reserve with a torn ACL, and as a result missed all but one game in the 2013 season.

On July 25, 2014, Ballard was carted off the practice field due to an apparent ankle injury. An MRI revealed that Ballard tore his Achilles tendon, which caused him to miss the full 2014 season.

On September 15, 2015, the Colts placed Ballard on waivers. Ballard cleared waivers and reverted to the Colts roster on injured reserve. The Colts and Ballard reached an injury settlement on September 22, making him a free agent.

=== New Orleans Saints ===
On February 3, 2016, Ballard signed a reserve/future contract with the New Orleans Saints. On May 9, Ballard was released by the team.

== NFL career statistics ==
=== Regular season ===
Year	Team	Games		Rushing					Receiving					Fumbles	
Year	Team	GP	GS	Att	Yds	Avg	Lng	TD	Rec	Yds	Avg	Lng	TD	Fum	Lost
2012	IND	16	12	211	814	3.9	26	2	17	152	8.9	19	1	3	0
2013	IND	1	1	13	63	4.8	12	0	1	-5	-5.0	-5	0	0	0
2014	IND	0	0	Did not play due to injury											
2015	IND	0	0	Did not play due to injury											
Total		17	17	224	877	3.9	26	2	18	147	8.2	19	1	3	0

=== Postseason ===
Year	Team	Games		Rushing					Receiving					Fumbles	
Year	Team	GP	GS	Att	Yds	Avg	Lng	TD	Rec	Yds	Avg	Lng	TD	Fum	Lost
2012	IND	1	1	22	91	4.1	24	0	1	3	3.0	3	0	0	0
Total		1	1	22	91	4.1	24	0	1	3	3.0	3	0	0	0

== Post NFL retirement ==
After his football career was over, he went back to college, earning a Bachelor of Science in mechanical engineering from University of Central Florida in 2022 and a Master of Science in industrial engineering and systems engineering from University of Florida in 2025.

As of 2025, he is employed by Lockheed Martin as an aeronautical engineer since 2023.
