= Chuck Pagano =

American football player and coach (born 1960)

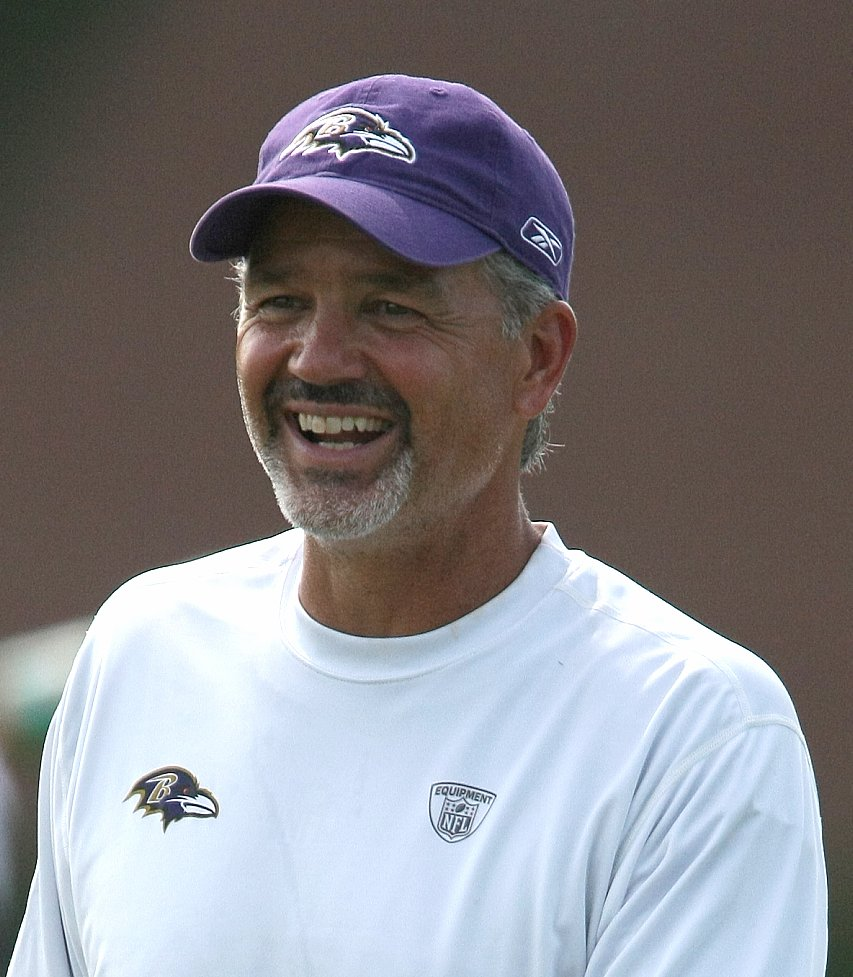
- Pagano with the Baltimore Ravens in 2009

Personal information
- Born: October 2, 1960 (age 66); Boulder, Colorado, U.S.

Career information
- Position: Safety
- High school: Fairview (Boulder)
- College: Wyoming

Career history
- USC (1984–1985) Graduate assistant; Miami (FL) (1986) Graduate assistant; Boise State (1987–1988) Linebackers coach; East Carolina (1989) Defensive backs coach; UNLV (1990) Defensive backs coach; UNLV (1991) Defensive coordinator; East Carolina (1992–1994) Defensive backs coach and linebackers coach; Miami (FL) (1995–2000) Defensive backs and special teams coach; Cleveland Browns (2001–2004) Secondary coach; Oakland Raiders (2005–2006) Defensive backs coach; North Carolina (2007) Defensive coordinator; Baltimore Ravens (2008–2010) Secondary coach; Baltimore Ravens (2011) Defensive coordinator; Indianapolis Colts (2012–2017) Head coach; Chicago Bears (2019–2020) Defensive coordinator; Baltimore Ravens (2025) Senior defensive assistant/secondary coach

Awards and highlights
- Greasy Neale Award (2012); George Halas Award (2013)

Head coaching record
- Regular season: 53–43 (.552)
- Postseason: 3–3 (.500)
- Career: 56–46 (.549)
- Coaching profile at Pro Football Reference

Charles David Pagano (born October 2, 1960) is an American football coach who most recently served as a senior defensive assistant and secondary coach for the Baltimore Ravens of the National Football League (NFL). He served as the head coach of the Indianapolis Colts from 2012 to 2017. Pagano previously served as the defensive coordinator for the Baltimore Ravens in 2011, of the Chicago Bears from 2019 to 2020, and was an assistant coach for the Oakland Raiders and Cleveland Browns. Pagano retired from coaching in 2021, but returned starting in the 2025 season. He is the older brother of coach John Pagano.

== Playing career ==
Pagano was a three-year letterman and two-year starter at strong safety at Fairview High School in Boulder, Colorado. Collegiately, Pagano was a four-year letterman and four-year starter at strong safety at Wyoming and graduated with a degree in marketing in 1984.

== Coaching career ==
=== College career ===
Pagano's coaching career began as a graduate assistant at the University of Southern California (USC) from 1984 to 1985 before a parallel move to University of Miami in 1986. He was outside linebackers coach at Boise State University from 1987 to 1988, then coached defensive backs at East Carolina University and the University of Nevada, Las Vegas (UNLV) in 1989 and 1990, respectively. By 1991, Pagano had been promoted to defensive coordinator for UNLV, but left the team midway through the season and returned to East Carolina to coach defensive backs and outside linebackers a year later.

Pagano first linked with Butch Davis in 1995, returning to the University of Miami to coach the secondary and coordinate special teams. In his five years there, he recruited and coached four first round NFL draft picks, and during the 2000 season, his secondary was named the nation's best by College Football News. His defensive backs did not allow a passing touchdown over the last 27 quarters of the 1999 season. Miami also blocked 39 kicks in 59 games, including a school record 12 blocks in 1996.

At the end of the 2006 season, Pagano rejoined Davis following his appointment as head coach of North Carolina. In his first and only season, they finished with a record of 4–8, but were narrowly beaten by less than seven points in six of those games.

=== NFL ===
==== Cleveland Browns ====
In 2001, Pagano joined Davis in the NFL as secondary coach for the Cleveland Browns. In 2003, he helped the Browns tie a franchise record for the fewest passing touchdowns allowed with 13. In 2001, the secondary accounted for 28 of the Browns' NFL-high 33 interceptions, and, in the same season, rookie cornerback Anthony Henry led the league with ten interceptions.

==== Oakland Raiders ====
After leaving Cleveland in 2004, Pagano spent two seasons as the defensive backs coach of the Oakland Raiders. In 2006, the Raiders allowed just 151 passing yards per game and 285 total yards per game. This ranked them first and third in the league, respectively.

==== Baltimore Ravens ====
Pagano was named to John Harbaugh's initial coaching staff with the Baltimore Ravens on February 12, 2008. He served as defensive secondary coach for three seasons. He was promoted to defensive coordinator on January 18, 2011, succeeding Greg Mattison who accepted a similar position at the University of Michigan. That year, Pagano's defense finished third in both points allowed and in yards allowed; they also finished 13th in takeaways and second in rushing yards allowed, the latter of which came to little surprise as Baltimore's defense has always been known for its ability to stop the run. However, Pagano drastically improved the pass defense, going from 21st in passing yards allowed to 4th; they also improved from ninth in passing touchdowns allowed to first in the league. The defense also came away with 17 interceptions. Pagano is known for his ability to stop opposing teams' pass attacks.

==== Indianapolis Colts ====
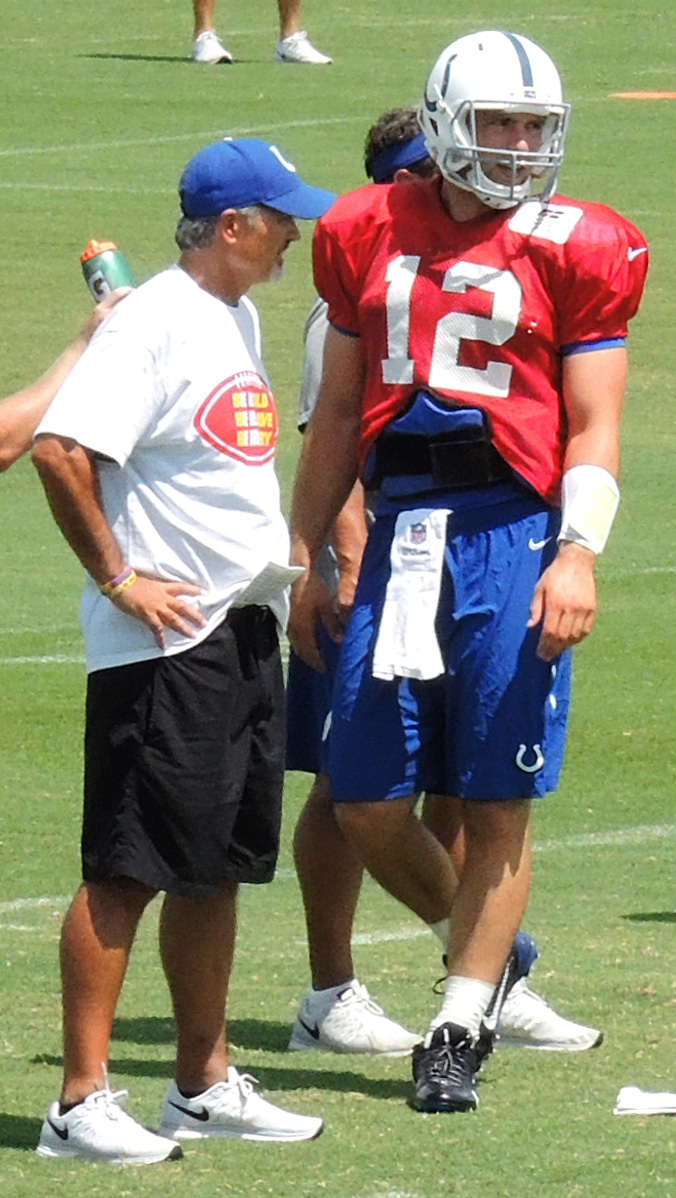
Pagano (left) and Andrew Luck (right) at the Colts training camp in 2015

On January 25, 2012, Pagano was named the head coach of the Indianapolis Colts. He joined a Colts team coming off a 2–14 season without long-time franchise cornerstone Peyton Manning, who sat out the 2011 season due to a neck injury he suffered prior to the season's start. Pagano underwent treatment for leukemia from weeks 5 through 16; he returned, with his cancer in remission, during the final week of the regular season. New offensive coordinator Bruce Arians became the interim head coach in place of Pagano and the Colts finished 11–5, good for a 9-game turnaround over the previous year and a 5th seed playoff berth. They were defeated by the eventual Super Bowl champion and Pagano's former team, Baltimore Ravens in the Wild Card round.

Looking to improve on his first season in Indy, Pagano again led the team to an 11–5 record, which was good for 1st place in the AFC South (after going 6–0 in the division). In the Wild Card matchup against the Kansas City Chiefs, the Colts overcame a 28-point deficit to stun the Chiefs 45–44 giving Pagano his first playoff victory. They lost in the next round to the New England Patriots.

The following year, Pagano once again led the team to an 11–5 record and first place in the division. Keeping up the trend of moving forward, the Colts would defeat both the Cincinnati Bengals and Denver Broncos in the first two rounds of the playoffs, advancing to their first AFC Championship Game under Pagano. In the AFC Championship, they lost to the eventual Super Bowl champion Patriots. Before that game, the Colts had notified the league that the Patriots were allegedly under-inflating the footballs (Deflategate), allegedly based on a tip from the Baltimore Ravens, who fell to New England the previous week in the Divisional Round.

Looking to defend their back-to-back division titles and finally advance to the Super Bowl, the Colts finished 8–8 in 2015 and missed the playoffs for the first time under Pagano. Quarterback Andrew Luck struggled with injuries and played just six games. Pagano did manage to keep the Colts in playoff contention all season, which included a league-leading 6 wins with reserve quarterbacks. He was given a four-year contract extension at the conclusion of the season.

Pagano again coached the Colts to an 8–8 record in 2016, missing the playoffs and finishing 3rd in the AFC South.

For the 2017 season, Luck was injured and did not play in any games. The Colts finished with a 4–12 record. On December 31, 2017, an hour after defeating the Houston Texans 22–13 in the final game of the season, Pagano was fired after missing the playoffs for the third straight year.

Following his firing from the Colts, Pagano spent the 2018 season as a consultant for various NFL teams.

==== Chicago Bears ====
On January 11, 2019, Pagano was hired by the Chicago Bears as their defensive coordinator, replacing Vic Fangio, who left to become the head coach of the Denver Broncos.

In Pagano's Bears debut against the Green Bay Packers, the defense recorded five sacks and held the Packers to ten points, but offensive struggles led to a 10–3 loss. The unit enjoyed early success that included limiting the Minnesota Vikings' second-ranked rushing offense to just 40 yards as the team began the year 3–1, while its ten takeaways were the third most in the league by the Week 6 bye, but struggled with penalties. The Bears finished the year 8–8 with the eighth-ranked defense and ninth in both running and passing categories; Chicago was also fourth in total points allowed, the only team in the top five that did not reach the playoffs. Linebacker Khalil Mack and safety Eddie Jackson were voted to the 2020 Pro Bowl, with nose tackle Eddie Goldman and cornerback Kyle Fuller being named alternates.

The defense began the 2020 season with the seventh-ranked defense in yardage as the Bears went 5–1. However, the team eventually suffered a six-game losing streak that saw the offense struggle while the defense could not sustain their performance. Exiting the Week 11 bye week, the defense regressed as it gave up over 35 points in consecutive games. The unit also allowed a team-record seven consecutive games in which the opposing quarterback had a passer rating over 100. The Bears ended the season 8–8 again but qualified for the playoffs; in the Wild Card Round, the defense held the New Orleans Saints to seven points in the first half before losing 21–9. The defense finished the year as the 14th-ranked scoring defense, 12th in passing, 15th in rushing, and fifth in the red zone. Mack was named to the 2021 Pro Bowl roster, while he and Roquan Smith made the 2020 All-Pro Team.

On January 13, 2021, Pagano announced his retirement, explaining in a statement that coaching "takes a lot of time away from your family and loved ones. I'm excited to start this new chapter of my life and can't wait to be able to spend more time with my family. This has been an amazing ride and I have made countless relationships that I will cherish forever."

==== Baltimore Ravens (second stint) ====
On January 28, 2025, Pagano was hired by the Baltimore Ravens as their senior secondary coach.

== Media career ==
After making recurring appearances on The Pat McAfee Show, Pagano began hosting a new segment called "Coach P's Keys" on Thursdays during the 2022 NFL season. Following the show's move to ESPN, the segment was dropped, but Pagano has remained in studio as a pundit.

== Personal life ==
Pagano was diagnosed with acute promyelocytic leukemia in September 2012, and took an indefinite leave of absence of his coaching duties. He then underwent three months of treatment at the IU Simon Cancer Center in Indianapolis. On November 5, doctors announced that Pagano's cancer was in remission. To support Pagano, two dozen of the Colts' players, and two of their cheerleaders, shaved their heads as part of a movement to support Pagano known as "CHUCKSTRONG". Offensive coordinator Bruce Arians led the Colts during the next 12 games. Pagano returned to his head coaching duties on December 24, 2012.

Pagano is a Christian. He and his wife Tina are the parents of three daughters.

Pagano's nephew, Carlo Kemp, is an American football linebacker who has played in the United States Football League, and has been a practice squad member of two other NFL teams. He is the older brother of John Pagano, who has also worked in the NFL.

== Head coaching record ==
Team	Year	Regular season					Postseason			
Team	Year	Won	Lost	Ties	Win %	Finish	Won	Lost	Win %	Result
IND (Note: Pagano was present on the sidelines for four regular season games as he recovered from cancer, but the team's overall record for this season is still officially accredited to Pagano.)	2012	11	5	0	.688	2nd in AFC South	0	1	.000	Lost to Baltimore Ravens in AFC wild card game
IND	2013	11	5	0	.688	1st in AFC South	1	1	.500	Lost to New England Patriots in AFC Divisional Game
IND	2014	11	5	0	.688	1st in AFC South	2	1	.667	Lost to New England Patriots in AFC Championship Game
IND	2015	8	8	0	.500	2nd in AFC South	–	–	–	–
IND	2016	8	8	0	.500	3rd in AFC South	–	–	–	–
IND	2017	4	12	0	.250	3rd in AFC South	–	–	–	–
Total		53	43	0	.552		3	3	.500	
