= James Aiono =

American football player (born 1989)

Profile
- Position: Defensive end

Personal information
- Born: January 23, 1989 (age 37); Anaheim, California
- Listed height: 6 ft 3 in (1.91 m)
- Listed weight: 305 lb (138 kg)

Career information
- College: Utah (2010–2011)
- NFL draft: 2012: undrafted

Career history
- Indianapolis Colts (2012)

Awards and highlights
- 1st-team junior college All-American (2008)

James Aiono (born January 23, 1989) is an American former football defensive end. He was signed by the Indianapolis Colts after going undrafted in the 2012 NFL draft. He played college football at Snow College and Utah.

== College career ==
Aiono appeared in 23 games for the Utes from 2010 to 2011 and finished with 12 tackles. Prior to his career with the Utes, he played junior college football at Snow College and was a 2008 first-team junior college All-American.

== Professional career ==
After going undrafted in 2012, Aiono was signed by the Indianapolis Colts as an undrafted free agent. He was waived/injured on August 31, 2012, by the Colts and placed on injured reserve for the 2012 season and later released with an injury settlement on September 5, 2012.
