= Greg Cosell =

American film producer

- Born: 1956 (age 69–70); New York City, U.S.
- Occupations: Sports filmmaker; film producer; football analyst; author
- Years active: 1979–present

Greg Cosell is an NFL analyst and a senior producer at NFL Films. He is the nephew of the late broadcaster Howard Cosell.

Born in Queens, New York, Cosell attended Amherst College in Amherst, Massachusetts where he played basketball. After applying for a job at NFL Films, he was interviewed by founder Ed Sabol at the company's headquarters in Mount Laurel, New Jersey and then hired as a producer. In 1984, Cosell with NFL Films President Steve Sabol created a show titled Monday Night Matchup (now known as NFL Matchup) which was initially hosted by Chris Berman. Cosell co-hosts the show with Sal Paolantonio and Darius Butler. Cosell co-authored the book The Games That Changed the Game: The Evolution of the NFL in Seven Sundays.

Cosell joins SiriusXM Fantasy Football Morning with John Hansen and Adam Caplan weekly on Fridays breaking down game films for Fantasy Football fans. Each segment of the show plays a snippet of the show's theme song, "Lawyers, Guns and Money" by Warren Zevon. Cosell is also a semi-regular contributor to MSG Western New York's midday show One Bills Live and The Herd with Colin Cowherd on Fox Sports Radio and Fox Sports 1.
