= 2013 Indianapolis Colts season =

61st season in franchise history

- Owner: Jim Irsay
- General manager: Ryan Grigson
- Head coach: Chuck Pagano
- Offensive coordinator: Pep Hamilton
- Defensive coordinator: Greg Manusky
- Home stadium: Lucas Oil Stadium

Results
- Record: 11–5
- Division place: 1st AFC South
- Playoffs: Won Wild Card Playoffs (vs. Chiefs) 45–44; Lost Divisional Playoffs (at Patriots) 22–43
- Pro Bowlers: QB Andrew Luck; OLB Robert Mathis; LS Matt Overton

Uniform
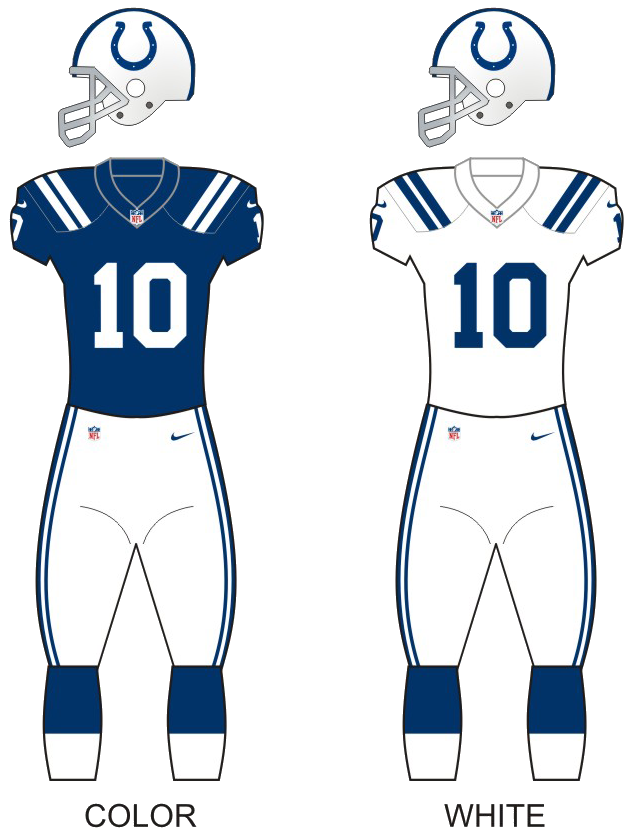

The 2013 season was the Indianapolis Colts' 61st in the National Football League (NFL), their 30th in Indianapolis, their sixth playing their home games at Lucas Oil Stadium, and their second under head coach Chuck Pagano, who missed most of the 2012 season due to treatment for leukemia. Throughout the season, the Colts wore a patch to recognize the 30th season since their move to Indianapolis.

While losing their Week 14 match-up against the Cincinnati Bengals, the Colts clinched their 15th division title after the Denver Broncos defeated the Tennessee Titans and their first without Peyton Manning. The Colts matched their 2012 record of 11–5, and went undefeated within the division during the season.

In the AFC wild card game against the Kansas City Chiefs, the Colts rallied to turn a 38–10 Chiefs' lead into a 45–44 victory for the second-largest comeback in NFL playoff history. It is behind the Buffalo Bills who rallied from a 32-point deficit in the 1993 AFC Wild Card Game. The Colts' season came to an end with a 43–22 loss to the New England Patriots in the divisional round.

== 2013 NFL draft ==
2013 Indianapolis Colts draft
Round	Pick	Player	Position	College	Notes
1	24	Björn Werner	DE	Florida State	
3	86	Hugh Thornton	OG	Illinois	
4	121	Khaled Holmes	C	USC	
5	139	Montori Hughes	DT	Tennessee-Martin	Pick from CLE
6	192	John Boyett	S	Oregon	
7	230	Kerwynn Williams	RB	Utah State	
7	254	Justice Cunningham	TE	South Carolina	
Made roster † Pro Football Hall of Fame * Made at least one Pro Bowl during career

Notes

- The team traded its second-round selection (No. 54 overall) to the Miami Dolphins in exchange for cornerback Vontae Davis.
- The team traded its original fifth-round selection (No. 157 overall) along with a 2012 fourth-round selection to the San Francisco 49ers in exchange for the 49ers' 2012 third-round selection.
- The team acquired a new fifth-round selection (No. 139 overall) in a trade that sent its 2014 fourth-round selection to the Cleveland Browns.
- Selection No. 254 is a compensatory selection.

=== Undrafted free agents ===
Position	Player	College
T	Emmett Cleary	Boston College
K	Brandon McManus	Temple
RB	Dan Moore	Montana
RB	Denodus O'Bryant	Lindenwood
CB	Sheldon Price	UCLA
LB	C.O. Prime	Wagner
WR	Rodrick Rumble	Idaho State
WR	Lanear Sampson	Baylor
CB	Daxton Swanson	Sam Houston State
CB	Nigel Malone	Kansas State

=== Departures ===
Position	Player	Tag	2013 Team	Notes
WR	Austin Collie	UFA	San Francisco 49ers	Signed by San Francisco on August 2, 2013.
DE	Dwight Freeney	UFA	San Diego Chargers	Signed by San Diego on May 18, 2013.
CB	Jerraud Powers	UFA	Arizona Cardinals	Signed by Arizona on March 13, 2013.
QB	Drew Stanton	UFA	Arizona Cardinals	Signed by Arizona on March 13, 2013.
WR	Donnie Avery	UFA	Kansas City Chiefs	Signed by Kansas City on March 13, 2013.
LB	Moise Fokou	UFA	Tennessee Titans	Signed by Tennessee on March 13, 2013.
S	Tom Zbikowski	UFA	Chicago Bears	Signed by Chicago on March 23, 2013.
LB	Jerry Hughes	Trade	Buffalo Bills	Traded away on April 29, 2013.
RB	Alvester Alexander	UFA		Waived on April 30, 2013.
C	A.Q. Shipley	Trade	Baltimore Ravens	Traded away on May 9, 2013.

=== Additions ===
Position	Player	Tag	2012 team	Notes
P	Pat McAfee	FT	Indianapolis Colts	Applied with Franchise Tag on March 1, 2013.
DE	Fili Moala	UFA	Indianapolis Colts	Re-signed on March 4, 2013.
CB	Darius Butler	UFA	Indianapolis Colts	Re-signed on March 12, 2013.
T	Gosder Cherilus	UFA	Detroit Lions	Signed on March 12, 2013.
CB	Greg Toler	UFA	Arizona Cardinals	Signed on March 12, 2013.
OLB	Erik Walden	UFA	Green Bay Packers	Signed on March 12, 2013.
G	Donald Thomas	UFA	New England Patriots	Signed on March 12, 2013.
OLB	Lawrence Sidbury	UFA	Atlanta Falcons	Signed on March 12, 2013.
S	LaRon Landry	UFA	New York Jets	Signed on March 13, 2013.
DE	Ricky Jean-Francois	UFA	San Francisco 49ers	Signed on March 14, 2013.
CB	Cassius Vaughn	RFA	Indianapolis Colts	Re-signed on March 18, 2013.
QB	Matt Hasselbeck	UFA	Tennessee Titans	Signed on March 19, 2013.
G	Joe Reitz	ERFA	Indianapolis Colts	Re-signed on March 20, 2013.
NT	Aubrayo Franklin	UFA	San Diego Chargers	Signed on March 20, 2013.
NT	Martin Tevaseu	ERFA	Indianapolis Colts	Re-signed on March 22, 2013.
FB	Stanley Havili	Trade	Philadelphia Eagles	Traded for on March 28, 2013.
T	Jeff Linkenbach	ERFA	Indianapolis Colts	Re-signed on March 28, 2013.
WR	Darrius Heyward-Bey	UFA	Oakland Raiders	Signed on April 1, 2013.
ILB	Josh McNary	UFA	No team in 2012	Signed on April 11, 2013.
CB	Josh Gordy	ERFA	Indianapolis Colts	Re-signed on April 15, 2013.
LB	Kelvin Sheppard	Trade	Buffalo Bills	Traded for on April 29, 2013.
RB	Ahmad Bradshaw	UFA	New York Giants	Signed on June 11, 2013.
RB	Trent Richardson	Trade	Cleveland Browns	Traded for on September 18, 2013

=== Team captains ===
Position	Player
QB	Andrew Luck
OLB	Robert Mathis
K	Adam Vinatieri

Note

- Team captains had not been selected, or at least, players selected as captains did not begin to display their signature "C-patch" on their jerseys until during their Week 15 match-up against Houston. This just so happened to be the week that followed the Colts securing the AFC South title and their 26th playoff berth in franchise history.

== Staff ==
2013 Indianapolis Colts staff
Front office: Owner/CEO – Jim Irsay; General manager – Ryan Grigson; Vice president of football operations – Jimmy Raye III; Director of college scouting – T. J. McCreight; Director of football administration – Mike Bluem; Associate director of pro personnel – Kevin Rogers; Assistant director of college scouting – Todd Vasvari; Head coaches: Head coach – Chuck Pagano; Offensive coaches: Offensive coordinator – Pep Hamilton; Quarterbacks – Clyde Christensen; Running backs – David Walker; Wide receivers – Charlie Williams; Tight ends – Alfredo Roberts; Offensive line – Joe Gilbert; Assistant offensive line – Hal Hunter; Offensive assistant – Tim Berbenich; Offensive quality control – Frank Giufre	Defensive coaches: Defensive coordinator – Greg Manusky; Defensive line – Gary Emanuel; Linebackers – Jeff FitzGerald; Secondary – Mike Gillhamer; Safeties – Roy Anderson; Defensive quality control – Brad White; Special teams coaches: Special teams coordinator – Tom McMahon; Assistant special teams – Brant Boyer; Strength and conditioning: Strength and conditioning – Roger Marandino; Assistant strength and conditioning – Richard Howell

== Final roster ==
2013 Indianapolis Colts roster
Quarterbacks (QB): 8 Matt Hasselbeck; 12 Andrew Luck; Running backs (RB): 31 Donald Brown; 43 Tashard Choice; 39 Stanley Havili FB; 34 Trent Richardson; Wide receivers (WR): 15 LaVon Brazill; 81 Darrius Heyward-Bey; 13 T. Y. Hilton; 16 Da'Rick Rogers; 17 Griff Whalen PR; Tight ends (TE): 84 Jack Doyle; 80 Coby Fleener; 47 Weslye Saunders	Offensive linemen (OL): 74 Anthony Castonzo T; 78 Gosder Cherilus T; 62 Khaled Holmes C/G; 72 Jeff Linkenbach T/G; 75 Mike McGlynn G/C; 71 Xavier Nixon T; 76 Joe Reitz T/G; 64 Samson Satele C; 69 Hugh Thornton G; Defensive linemen (DL): 96 Josh Chapman NT; 97 Aubrayo Franklin NT; 99 Ricky Jean Francois DE; 95 Fili Moala DE; 91 Ricardo Mathews DE; 61 Jeris Pendleton NT; 90 Cory Redding DE	Linebackers (LB): 56 Daniel Adongo OLB; 53 Kavell Conner ILB; 50 Jerrell Freeman ILB; 59 Cam Johnson OLB; 98 Robert Mathis OLB; 57 Josh McNary ILB; 52 Kelvin Sheppard ILB; 58 Andy Studebaker OLB; 93 Erik Walden OLB; 92 Björn Werner OLB; Defensive backs (DB): 41 Antoine Bethea SS; 38 Sergio Brown SS; 20 Darius Butler CB; 23 Vontae Davis CB; 27 Josh Gordy CB; 30 LaRon Landry FS; 42 Corey Lynch FS; 40 Sheldon Price CB; 28 Greg Toler CB; 32 Cassius Vaughn CB; Special teams (ST): 1 Pat McAfee P; 45 Matt Overton LS; 4 Adam Vinatieri K	Practice squad: 67 Zach Allen G; 65 Thomas Austin C; 49 Alan Baxter LB; 5 Chandler Harnish QB; 11 Josh Lenz WR; 68 Jake McDonough DE; 35 Tauren Poole RB; 85 Martell Webb TE; Reserve: 83 Dwayne Allen TE (IR); 79 Justin Anderson G (IR); 51 Pat Angerer ILB (IR); 33 Vick Ballard RB (IR); 44 Ahmad Bradshaw RB (IR); 54 Mario Harvey ILB (IR); 36 Dan Herron RB (IR); 55 Justin Hickman OLB (IR); 26 Delano Howell FS (IR); 94 Montori Hughes (IR); 56 Scott Lutrus ILB (IR); 25 Chris Rainey RB (IR); 56 Lawrence Sidbury OLB (IR); 66 Donald Thomas G (IR); 87 Reggie Wayne WR (IR); Rookies in italics 53 active, 15 reserve, 8 practice squad

== Schedule ==
=== Preseason ===
Week	Date	Opponent	Result	Record	Venue	Recap
1	August 11	Buffalo Bills	**L** 20–44	0–1	Lucas Oil Stadium	Recap
2	August 18	at New York Giants	**W** 20–12	1–1	MetLife Stadium	Recap
3	August 24	Cleveland Browns	**W** 27–6	2–1	Lucas Oil Stadium	Recap
4	August 29	at Cincinnati Bengals	**L** 10–27	2–2	Paul Brown Stadium	Recap

=== Regular season ===
For the first time since the 2002 season, the Colts did not play the New England Patriots during the regular season. The Colts–Patriots rivalry had become one of the most known in modern era sports. However, they did play each other in playoffs.

One highlight of the 2013 Colts season was a trip to San Francisco to play the 49ers. This game marked the return of starting quarterback Andrew Luck to the San Francisco Bay Area, where he played three seasons of college football at Stanford University, which for his first two years there was coached by Jim Harbaugh, then-coach of the 49ers. Luck got the better of his old coach with a 27–7 statement victory.

Week	Date	Opponent	Result	Record	Venue	Recap
1	September 8	Oakland Raiders	**W** 21–17	1–0	Lucas Oil Stadium	Recap
2	September 15	Miami Dolphins	**L** 20–24	1–1	Lucas Oil Stadium	Recap
3	September 22	at San Francisco 49ers	**W** 27–7	2–1	Candlestick Park	Recap
4	September 29	at **Jacksonville Jaguars**	**W** 37–3	3–1	EverBank Field	Recap
5	October 6	Seattle Seahawks	**W** 34–28	4–1	Lucas Oil Stadium	Recap
6	October 14	at San Diego Chargers	**L** 9–19	4–2	Qualcomm Stadium	Recap
7	October 20	Denver Broncos	**W** 39–33	5–2	Lucas Oil Stadium	Recap
8	Bye					
9	November 3	at **Houston Texans**	**W** 27–24	6–2	Reliant Stadium	Recap
10	November 10	St. Louis Rams	**L** 8–38	6–3	Lucas Oil Stadium	Recap
11	November 14	at **Tennessee Titans**	**W** 30–27	7–3	LP Field	Recap
12	November 24	at Arizona Cardinals	**L** 11–40	7–4	University of Phoenix Stadium	Recap
13	December 1	**Tennessee Titans**	**W** 22–14	8–4	Lucas Oil Stadium	Recap
14	December 8	at Cincinnati Bengals	**L** 28–42	8–5	Paul Brown Stadium	Recap
15	December 15	**Houston Texans**	**W** 25–3	9–5	Lucas Oil Stadium	Recap
16	December 22	at Kansas City Chiefs	**W** 23–7	10–5	Arrowhead Stadium	Recap
17	December 29	**Jacksonville Jaguars**	**W** 30–10	11–5	Lucas Oil Stadium	Recap

Note: Intra-division opponents are in bold text.

== Game summaries ==
=== Regular season ===
==== Week 1: vs. Oakland Raiders ====
Week One: Oakland Raiders at Indianapolis Colts – Game summary

Quarter	1	2	3	4	Total
Raiders	0	7	3	7	17
Colts	7	7	0	7	21

at Lucas Oil Stadium, Indianapolis, Indiana

- Date: September 8
- Game time: 1:00 p.m. EDT
- Game weather: Played indoors (retractable roof closed)
- Game attendance: 65,412
- Referee: Bill Vinovich
- TV announcers (CBS): Marv Albert (play-by-play) and Rich Gannon (color commentator)
- Recap, Game book

Game information

First quarter

- IND – 2:47 Reggie Wayne 12-yard TD pass from Andrew Luck, Adam Vinatieri kick. Drive: 10 plays, 89 yards, 6:17. (IND 7–0)

Second quarter

- IND – 10:47 Dwayne Allen 20-yard TD pass from Andrew Luck, Adam Vinatieri kick. Drive: 8 plays, 69 yards, 3:30. (IND 14–0)
- OAK – 4:53 Darren McFadden 1-yard TD run, Sebastian Janikowski kick. Drive: 11 plays, 85 yards, 5:54. (IND 14–7)

Third quarter

- OAK – 5:42 Sebastian Janikowski 38-yard FG. Drive: 10 plays, 65 yards, 4:41. (IND 14–10)

Fourth quarter

- OAK – 11:09 Denarius Moore 5-yard TD pass from Terrelle Pryor, Sebastian Janikowski kick. Drive: 11 plays, 44 yards, 5:41. (OAK 17–14)
- IND – 5:20 Andrew Luck 19-yard TD run, Adam Vinatieri kick. Drive: 11 plays, 80 yards, 5:49. (IND 21–17)

Top passers

- OAK – Terrelle Pryor: 19/29, 217 yards, 1 TD, 2 INT
- IND – Andrew Luck: 18/23, 178 yards, 2 TD

Top rushers

- OAK – Terrelle Pryor: 13 carries, 112 yards
- IND – Vick Ballard: 13 carries, 63 yards

Top receivers

- OAK – Rod Streater: 5 receptions, 70 yards
- IND – Reggie Wayne: 8 receptions, 96 yards, 1 TD

Top tacklers

- OAK – Nick Roach: 5 tackles, 4 assists
- IND – LaRon Landry: 10 tackles, 5 assists

The Colts began their 2013 season at home, for the first time since 2009, against the Oakland Raiders. The Raiders, who received the opening kickoff, would turn the ball over on a Terrelle Pryor interception by Colts cornerback Greg Toler. The interception would allow Andrew Luck and the Colts offense to drive down the field and score the first touchdown of the season on a pass from Luck to Reggie Wayne. Heading into the second quarter, the Colts defense would continue to prevent the Raiders from scoring, forcing Oakland to punt on second drive of the game. Luck would again lead the Colts down the field in an eight play, 69-yard drive that would result in a touchdown pass from Luck to tight end Dwayne Allen, giving the Colts an early 14–0 lead. Pryor and the Raiders would respond for the first time on their next offensive drive, which ended in a touchdown run from Darren McFadden. Defensive stops by both the Colts and the Raiders would ensure no further scoring in the half and would allow Indianapolis to head into halftime with the 14–7 lead. Indianapolis was forced to punt on their first offensive possession of the second half, while the Raiders would drive down to the Colts 20-yard line and would score on a Sebastian Janikowski field goal, cutting the Colts lead to 14–10 lead. The Raiders would again begin to drive down the field and would score the go ahead touchdown early in the fourth quarter on a pass from Denarius Moore from Terrelle Pryor, giving the Raiders a 17–14 lead. Andrew Luck, on the next Colts offensive drive, would lead the team down the field, 71 yards in 11 plays, with Luck himself scoring the game-winning touchdown on a 19-yard run. Pryor and the Raiders would drive down to the Colts 24-yard line, though the drive would end with an interception by Antoine Bethea, sealing the Colts victory.

With the win, the Colts went to 1–0 on the season and extended their home winning streak to seven games. This was the last time the Colts would win a season opener until 2025.

==== Week 2: vs. Miami Dolphins ====
Week Two: Miami Dolphins at Indianapolis Colts – Game summary

Quarter	1	2	3	4	Total
Dolphins	14	3	7	0	24
Colts	3	14	3	0	20

at Lucas Oil Stadium, Indianapolis, Indiana

- Date: September 15
- Game time: 1:00 p.m. EDT
- Game weather: 72 °F (22 °C), partly cloudy (retractable roof open)
- Game attendance: 65,406
- Referee: Clete Blakeman
- TV announcers (CBS): Ian Eagle (play-by-play) and Dan Fouts (color commentator)
- Recap, Game book

Game information

First quarter

- MIA – 9:43 Mike Wallace 18-yard TD pass from Ryan Tannehill, Caleb Sturgis kick. Drive: 6 plays, 58 yards, 2:19. (MIA 7–0)
- IND – 4:07 Adam Vinatieri 30-yard FG. Drive: 12 plays, 69 yards, 5:36. (MIA 7–3)
- MIA – 2:54 Lamar Miller 10-yard TD run, Caleb Sturgis kick. Drive: 3 plays, 80 yards, 1:13. (MIA 14–3)

Second quarter

- IND – 13:01 Coby Fleener 3-yard TD pass from Andrew Luck, Adam Vinatieri kick. Drive: 10 plays, 80 yards, 4:53. (MIA 14–10)
- IND – 1:26 Ahmad Bradshaw 1-yard TD run, Adam Vinatieri kick. Drive: 6 plays, 78 yards, 1:16. (IND 17–14)
- MIA – 0:00 Caleb Sturgis 54-yard FG. Drive: 7 plays, 44 yards, 1:26. (tied 17–17)

Third quarter

- IND – 11:35 Adam Vinatieri 38-yard FG. Drive: 6 plays, 19 yards, 2:22. (IND 20–17)
- MIA – 4:40 Charles Clay 1-yard TD run, Caleb Sturgis kick. Drive: 6 plays, 69 yards, 2:27. (MIA 24–20)

Fourth quarter No scoring

Top passers

- MIA – Ryan Tannehill: 23/34, 319 yards, 1 TD
- IND – Andrew Luck: 25/43, 321 yards, 1 TD, 1 INT

Top rushers

- MIA – Lamar Miller: 14 carries, 69 yards, 1 TD
- IND – Ahmad Bradshaw: 15 carries, 65 yards, 1 TD

Top receivers

- MIA – Mike Wallace: 9 receptions, 115 yards, 1 TD
- IND – T. Y. Hilton: 6 receptions, 124 yards

Top tacklers

- MIA – Dannell Ellerbe: 6 tackles, 8 assists
- IND – LaRon Landry: 6 tackles, 5 assists

The Colts faced the Miami Dolphins in week two, a rematch of the 23–20 Colts victory during the 2012 season. This game also marked the second meeting between Andrew Luck of the Colts and Ryan Tannehill of the Dolphins, both sophomore quarterbacks. Indianapolis, who received the opening kickoff, were unable to score on their first drive, unlike the Dolphins who drove down 58 yards in six plays, while scoring on a Tannehill pass to wide receiver Mike Wallace, giving the Dolphins an early 7–0 lead. The Colts would respond with a long drive of their own, however they would be able to put it into the endzone, settling instead for an Adam Vinatieri field goal. The Dolphins would strike again, this time scoring in just two plays following a Tannehill 67-yard pass and a Lamar Miller touchdown run. The Colts, who entered the second quarter trailing 14–3, quickly scored their first touchdown on the day with an Andrew Luck pass to tight end Coby Fleener. After trading possessions, the Indianapolis offense would strike again, scoring their second touchdown of the quarter and taking the first lead of the day, though it would be taken away by a Caleb Sturgis field goal to end the half, with the teams going into halftime tied at 17. Indianapolis would drive down on their first possession of the second half, though a touchdown would be nullified by an illegal shift penalty and forcing the Colts to settle for a field goal. Midway through the third quarter, the Dolphins would score the go ahead touchdown on a Charles Clay run, putting them ahead 24–20. On their last offensive possession of the day, Luck and the Colts would drive down to the Miami 23-yard line, though the comeback would fall short following a sack of Luck on fourth down.

With the loss, the Colts went to 1–1 on the season and lost their first home game since September 23, 2012.

==== Week 3: at San Francisco 49ers ====
Week Three: Indianapolis Colts at San Francisco 49ers – Game summary

Quarter	1	2	3	4	Total
Colts	7	3	3	14	27
49ers	7	0	0	0	7

at Candlestick Park, San Francisco, California

- Date: September 22
- Game time: 4:25 p.m. EDT/1:25 p.m. PDT
- Game weather: 66 °F (19 °C), sunny
- Game attendance: 69,732
- Referee: Terry McAulay
- TV announcers (CBS): Jim Nantz (play-by-play) and Phil Simms (color commentator)
- Recap, Game book

Game information

First quarter

- IND – 11:20 Trent Richardson 1-yard TD run, Adam Vinatieri kick. Drive: 7 plays, 80 yards, 3:40. (IND 7–0)
- SF – 4:13 Kendall Hunter 13-yard TD run, Phil Dawson kick. Drive: 9 plays, 91 yards, 4:34. (tied 7–7)

Second quarter

- IND – 7:00 Adam Vinatieri 43-yard FG. Drive: 8 plays, 30 yards, 4:48. (IND 10–7)

Third quarter

- IND – 6:46 Adam Vinatieri 41-yard FG. Drive: 10 plays, 52 yards, 5:08. (IND 13–7)

Fourth quarter

- IND – 4:13 Andrew Luck 6-yard TD run, Adam Vinatieri kick. Drive: 11 plays, 80 yards, 7:01. (IND 20–7)
- IND – 2:55 Ahmad Bradshaw 1-yard TD run, Adam Vinatieri kick. Drive: 3 plays, 8 yards, 0:56. (IND 27–7)

Top passers

- IND – Andrew Luck: 17/26, 159 yards
- SF – Colin Kaepernick: 13/27, 150 yards, 1 INT

Top rushers

- IND – Ahmad Bradshaw: 19 carries, 95 yards, 1 TD
- SF – Frank Gore: 11 carries, 82 yards

Top receivers

- IND – Darrius Heyward-Bey: 5 receptions, 59 yards
- SF – Anquan Boldin: 5 receptions, 67 yards

Top tacklers

- IND – Jerrell Freeman: 7 tackles, 1 assist
- SF – NaVorro Bowman: 9 tackles

==== Week 4: at Jacksonville Jaguars ====
Week Four: Indianapolis Colts at Jacksonville Jaguars – Game summary

Quarter	1	2	3	4	Total
Colts	0	20	14	3	37
Jaguars	3	0	0	0	3

at EverBank Field, Jacksonville, Florida

- Date: September 29
- Game time: 1:00 p.m. EDT
- Game weather: 80 °F (27 °C), partly cloudy
- Game attendance: 59,695
- Referee: John Parry
- TV announcers (CBS): Kevin Harlan (play-by-play) and Solomon Wilcots (color commentator)
- Recap, Game book

Game information

First quarter

- JAC – 7:00 Josh Scobee 53-yard FG. Drive: 4 plays, 6 yards, 1:11. (JAC 3–0)

Second quarter

- IND – 14:43 Adam Vinatieri 22-yard FG. Drive: 11 plays, 54 yards, 3:45. (tied 3–3)
- IND – 11:48 Darius Butler 41-yard interception return for a TD, Adam Vinatieri kick. (IND 10–3)
- IND – 5:54 Trent Richardson 1-yard TD run, Adam Vinatieri kick. Drive: 6 plays, 81 yards, 3:28. (IND 17–3)
- IND – 1:34 Adam Vinatieri 46-yard FG. Drive: 10 plays, 44 yards, 3:18. (IND 20–3)

Third quarter

- IND – 12:15 Coby Fleener 31-yard TD pass from Andrew Luck, Adam Vinatieri kick. Drive: 2 plays, 63 yards, 0:37. (IND 27–3)
- IND – 1:22 Reggie Wayne 5-yard TD pass Andrew Luck, Adam Vinatieri kick. Drive: 12 plays, 72 yards, 8:35. (IND 34–3)

Fourth quarter

- IND – 1:53 Adam Vinatieri 28-yard FG. Drive: 7 plays, 37 yards, 2:56. (IND 37–3)

Top passers

- IND – Andrew Luck: 21/35, 257 yards, 2 TD, 1 INT
- JAC – Blaine Gabbert: 17/32, 179 yards, 3 INT

Top rushers

- IND – Donald Brown: 3 carries, 65 yards
- JAC – Maurice Jones-Drew: 13 carries, 23 yards

Top receivers

- IND – Reggie Wayne: 5 receptions, 100 yards, 1 TD
- JAC – Cecil Shorts III: 7 receptions, 61 yards

Top tacklers

- IND – Darius Butler: 6 tackles
- JAC – Paul Posluszny: 8 tackles, 1 assist

==== Week 5: vs. Seattle Seahawks ====
Week Five: Seattle Seahawks at Indianapolis Colts – Game summary

Quarter	1	2	3	4	Total
Seahawks	12	7	9	0	28
Colts	7	10	6	11	34

at Lucas Oil Stadium, Indianapolis, Indiana

- Date: October 6
- Game time: 1:00 p.m. EDT
- Game weather: Played indoors (retractable roof closed)
- Game attendance: 66,608
- Referee: Ron Winter
- TV announcers (Fox): Kevin Burkhardt (play-by-play), John Lynch (color commentator) and Erin Andrews (sideline reporter)
- Recap, Game book

Game information

First quarter

- SEA – 11:40 Steven Hauschka 42-yard FG. Drive: 5 plays, 28 yards, 2:13. (SEA 3–0)
- SEA – 6:14 Golden Tate 10-yard TD pass from Russell Wilson, Steven Hauschka kick. Drive: 8 plays, 64 yards, 4:14. (SEA 10–0)
- SEA – 4:53 Punt blocked by Jermaine Kearse out of the end zone, safety. (SEA 12–0)
- IND – 1:04 T. Y. Hilton 72-yard TD pass from Andrew Luck, Adam Vinatieri kick. Drive: 4 plays, 84 yards, 1:41. (SEA 12–7)

Second quarter

- IND – 6:14 Delano Howell 61-yard TD return of blocked field goal. (IND 14–12)
- SEA – 5:57 Jermaine Kearse 28-yard TD pass from Russell Wilson, Steven Hauschka kick. Drive: 12 plays, 82 yards, 7:09. (SEA 19–14)
- IND – 0:58 Adam Vinatieri 41-yard field goal. Drive: 11 plays, 58 yards, 4:59. (SEA 19–17)

Third quarter

- SEA – 11:18 Steven Hauschka 36-yard FG. Drive: 9 plays, 62 yards, 3:42. (SEA 22–17)
- SEA – 8:12 Steven Hauschka 41-yard FG. Drive: 4 plays, 7 yards, 1:30. (SEA 25–17)
- IND – 4:16 T. Y. Hilton 29-yard TD pass from Andrew Luck, two-point conversion failed. Drive: 10 plays, 80 yards, 3:56. (SEA 25–23)
- SEA – 0:35 Steven Hauschka 46-yard FG. Drive: 9 plays, 52 yards, 3:41. (SEA 28–23)

Fourth quarter

- IND – 8:55 Donald Brown 3-yard TD run, two point conversion successful. Drive: 14 plays, 86 yards, 6:40. (IND 31–28)
- IND – 1:55 Adam Vinatieri 49-yard field goal. Drive: 9 plays, 42 yards, 4:43. (IND 34–28)

Top passers

- SEA – Russell Wilson: 15/31, 210 yards, 2 TD, 1 INT
- IND – Andrew Luck: 16/29, 229 yards, 2 TD

Top rushers

- SEA – Marshawn Lynch: 17 carries, 102 yards
- IND – Trent Richardson: 18 carries, 56 yards

Top receivers

- SEA – Doug Baldwin: 5 receptions, 80 yards
- IND – T. Y. Hilton: 5 receptions, 140 yards, 2 TD

Top tacklers

- SEA – Earl Thomas: 9 tackles, 1 assist
- IND – Jerrell Freeman: 7 tackles, 6 assists

==== Week 6: at San Diego Chargers ====
Week Six: Indianapolis Colts at San Diego Chargers – Game summary

Quarter	1	2	3	4	Total
Colts	3	3	0	3	9
Chargers	0	10	3	6	19

at Qualcomm Stadium, San Diego, California

- Date: October 14
- Game time: 8:40 p.m. EDT/5:40 p.m. PDT
- Game weather: 69 °F (21 °C), sunny
- Game attendance: 57,954
- Referee: Pete Morelli
- TV announcers (ESPN): Mike Tirico (play-by-play), Jon Gruden (color commentator) and Lisa Salters (sideline reporter)
- Recap, Game book

Game information

First quarter

- IND – 11:27 Adam Vinatieri 30-yard FG. Drive 8 plays, 69 yards, 3:33. (IND 3–0)

Second quarter

- SD – 3:16 Keenan Allen 22-yard TD pass from Philip Rivers, Nick Novak kick. Drive 12 plays, 74 yards, 6:14. (SD 7–3)
- SD – 1:41 Nick Novak 31-yard FG. Drive 17 plays, 79 yards, 7:58. (SD 10–3)
- IND – 0:00 Adam Vinatieri 50-yard FG. Drive 8 plays, 38 yards, 1:41. (SD 10–6)

Third quarter

- SD – 9:05 Nick Novak 33-yard FG. Drive 11 plays, 65 yards, 5:55. (SD 13–6)

Fourth quarter

- SD – 9:43 Nick Novak 34-yard FG. Drive 15 plays, 74 yards, 9:13. (SD 16–6)
- IND – 7:21 Adam Vinatieri 51-yard FG. Drive 6 plays, 47 yards, 2:22. (SD 16–9)
- SD – 1:55 Nick Novak 50-yard FG. Drive 5 plays, 19 yards, 1:22. (SD 19–9)

Top passers

- IND – Andrew Luck: 18/30, 202 yards, 1 INT
- SD – Philip Rivers: 22/33, 237 yards, 1 TD

Top rushers

- IND – Trent Richardson: 10 carries, 40 yards
- SD – Ryan Mathews: 22 carries, 102 yards

Top receivers

- IND – Reggie Wayne: 5 receptions, 88 yards
- SD – Keenan Allen: 9 receptions, 107 yards, 1 TD

Top tacklers

- IND – Mario Harvey: 9 tackles, 1 assist
- SD – Derek Cox: 5 tackles, 1 INT

==== Week 7: vs. Denver Broncos ====
Week Seven: Denver Broncos at Indianapolis Colts – Game summary

Quarter	1	2	3	4	Total
Broncos	7	7	3	16	33
Colts	10	16	7	6	39

at Lucas Oil Stadium, Indianapolis, Indiana

- Date: October 20
- Game time: 8:30 p.m. EDT
- Game weather: 57 °F (14 °C), clear (retractable roof open)
- Game attendance: 67,196
- Referee: Carl Cheffers
- TV announcers (NBC): Al Michaels (play-by-play), Cris Collinsworth (color commentator) and Michele Tafoya (sideline reporter)
- Recap, Game book

Game information

First quarter

- DEN – 8:16 Eric Decker 17-yard TD pass from Peyton Manning, Matt Prater kick. Drive 2 plays, 56 yards, 0:46. (DEN 7–0)
- IND – 4:05 Adam Vinatieri 27-yard FG. Drive 10 plays, 65 yards, 4:11. (DEN 7–3)
- IND – 1:20 Darrius Heyward-Bey 11-yard TD pass from Andrew Luck, Adam Vinatieri kick. Drive 1 play, 11 yards, 0:07. (IND 10–7)

Second quarter

- DEN – 11:56 Julius Thomas 12-yard TD pass from Peyton Manning, Matt Prater kick. Drive 8 plays, 51 yards, 4:24. (DEN 14–10)
- IND – 8:52 Peyton Manning fumble forced by Robert Mathis out of bounds in end zone for a safety. (DEN 14–12)
- IND – 5:50 Stanley Havili 20-yard TD pass from Andrew Luck, Adam Vinatieri kick. Drive 7 plays, 66 yards, 3:02. (IND 19–14)
- IND – 0:10 Coby Fleener 8-yard TD pass from Andrew Luck, Adam Vinatieri kick. Drive 6 plays, 50 yards, 1:25. (IND 26–14)

Third quarter

- IND – 5:00 Andrew Luck 10-yard TD run, Adam Vinatieri kick. Drive 4 plays, 41 yards, 1:49. (IND 33–14)
- DEN – 0:42 Matt Prater 31-yard FG. Drive 10 plays, 67 yards, 4:18. (IND 33–17)

Fourth quarter

- IND – 12:59 Adam Vinatieri 52-yard FG. Drive 7 plays, 46 yards, 2:43. (IND 36–17)
- DEN – 12:11 Demaryius Thomas 31-yard TD pass from Peyton Manning (2-point conversion failed). Drive 3 plays, 80 yards, 0:48. (IND 36–23)
- DEN – 8:44 Knowshon Moreno 1-yard TD run, Matt Prater kick. Drive 8 plays, 23 yards, 2:42. (IND 36–30)
- IND – 5:57 Adam Vinatieri 42-yard FG. Drive 4 plays, −3 yards, 1:02. (IND 39–30)
- DEN – 0:12 Matt Prater 47-yard FG. Drive 7 plays, 33 yards, 1:16. (IND 39–33)

Top passers

- DEN – Peyton Manning: 29/49, 386 yards, 3 TD, 1 INT
- IND – Andrew Luck: 21/38, 228 yards, 3 TD, 1 rush TD

Top rushers

- DEN – Knowshon Moreno: 15 carries, 40 yards, 1 TD
- IND – Trent Richardson: 14 carries, 37 yards

Top receivers

- DEN – Eric Decker: 8 receptions, 150 yards, 1 TD
- IND – Reggie Wayne: 5 receptions, 50 yards

Top tacklers

- DEN – Duke Ihenacho: 5 tackles, 4 assists, 1 fumble recovery
- IND – Antoine Bethea: 6 tackles, 3 assists, 1 fumble recovery

The game was preceded by a 90-second tribute to Manning.

==== Week 9: at Houston Texans ====
Week Nine: Indianapolis Colts at Houston Texans – Game summary

Quarter	1	2	3	4	Total
Colts	0	3	9	15	27
Texans	14	7	3	0	24

at Reliant Stadium, Houston, Texas

- Date: November 3
- Game time: 8:30 p.m. EST/7:30 p.m. CST
- Game weather: 60 °F (16 °C), clear (retractable roof open)
- Game attendance: 71,778
- Referee: Bill Vinovich
- TV announcers (NBC): Al Michaels (play-by-play), Cris Collinsworth (color commentator) and Michele Tafoya (sideline reporter)
- Recap, Game book

Game information

First quarter

- HOU – 14:00 Andre Johnson 62-yard TD pass from Case Keenum, Randy Bullock kick. Drive 3 plays, 73 yards, 1:00. (HOU 7–0)
- HOU – 4:13 Andre Johnson 41-yard TD pass from Case Keenum, Randy Bullock kick. Drive 4 plays, 57 yards, 2:05. (HOU 14–0)

Second quarter

- IND – 3:30 Adam Vinatieri 30-yard FG. Drive 4 plays, 41 yards, 1:30. (HOU 14–3)
- HOU – 0:34 Andre Johnson 5-yard pass from Case Keenum, Randy Bullock kick. Drive 7 plays, 72 yards, 2:56. (HOU 21–3)

Third quarter

- IND – 11:54 Adam Vinatieri 35-yard FG. Drive 10 plays, 41 yards, 3:06. (HOU 21–6)
- HOU – 4:25 Randy Bullock 43-yard FG. Drive 11 plays, 62 yards, 7:29. (HOU 24–6)
- IND – 0:05 T. Y. Hilton 10-yard pass from Andrew Luck (2-point conversion failed). Drive 13 plays, 78 yards, 4:20. (HOU 24–12)

Fourth quarter

- IND – 9:46 T. Y. Hilton 58-yard pass from Andrew Luck, Adam Vinatieri kick. Drive 2 plays, 67 yards, 0:46. (HOU 24–19)
- IND – 4:00 T. Y. Hilton 9-yard pass from Andrew Luck (2-point conversion pass to Coby Fleener). Drive 6 plays, 52 yards, 2:09. (IND 27–24)

Top passers

- IND – Andrew Luck: 18/40, 271 yards, 3 TD
- HOU – Case Keenum: 20/34, 350 yards, 3 TD

Top rushers

- IND – Donald Brown: 6 carries, 49 yards
- HOU – Ben Tate: 22 carries, 81 yards

Top receivers

- IND – T. Y. Hilton: 7 receptions, 121 yards, 3 TD
- HOU – Andre Johnson: 9 receptions, 229 yards, 3 TD

Top tacklers

- IND – Pat Angerer: 7 tackles, 5 assist
- HOU – Shiloh Keo: 6 tackles

The Colts fell behind 21–3 before rallying to defeat the Houston Texans on Sunday Night Football 27–24.

==== Week 10: vs. St. Louis Rams ====
Week Ten: St. Louis Rams at Indianapolis Colts – Game summary

Quarter	1	2	3	4	Total
Rams	7	21	10	0	38
Colts	0	0	8	0	8

at Lucas Oil Stadium, Indianapolis, Indiana

- Date: November 10
- Game time: 1:00 p.m. EST
- Game weather: Played indoors (retractable roof closed)
- Game attendance: 66,004
- Referee: Terry McAulay
- TV announcers (Fox): Chris Myers (play-by-play), Tim Ryan (color commentator) and Jennifer Hale (sideline reporter)
- Recap, Game book

Game information

First quarter

- STL - 12:12 Chris Long 45-yard fumble recovery TD, Greg Zuerlein kick. (STL 7–0)

Second quarter

- STL - 14:30 Zac Stacy 1-yard TD run, Greg Zuerlein kick. Drive 4 plays, 43 yards, 1:29. (STL 14–0)
- STL - 10:28 Tavon Austin 98-yard punt return TD, Greg Zuerlein kick. (STL 21–0)
- STL - 6:58 Tavon Austin 57-yard TD pass from Kellen Clemens, Greg Zuerlein kick. Drive 5 plays, 73 yards, 2:05. (STL 28–0)

Third quarter

- STL - 13:55 Tavon Austin 81-yard TD pass from Kellen Clemens, Greg Zuerlein kick. Drive 3 plays, 82 yards, 1:05. (STL 35–0)
- STL - 5:15 Greg Zuerlein 32-yard FG. Drive 8 plays, 45 yards, 4:46. (STL 38–0)
- IND - 1:35 Donald Brown 13-yard TD pass from Andrew Luck, 2-point conversion successful (Andrew Luck pass to Coby Fleener). Drive 8 plays, 80 yards, 3:40. (STL 38–8)

Fourth quarter No scoring

Top passers

- STL – Kellen Clemens: 9/16, 247 yards, 2 TDs
- IND – Andrew Luck: 29/47, 353 yards, 1 TD, 3 INTs

Top rushers

- STL – Benny Cunningham: 7 carries, 72 yards
- IND – Andrew Luck: 4 carries, 17 yards

Top receivers

- STL – Tavon Austin: 2 receptions, 138 yards, 2 TDs
- IND – T. Y. Hilton: 7 receptions, 130 yards

Top tacklers

- STL – Cortland Finnegan: 5 tackles, 3 assists
- IND – Jerrell Freeman: 6 tackles, 4 assists

==== Week 11: at Tennessee Titans ====
Week Eleven: Indianapolis Colts at Tennessee Titans – Game summary

Quarter	1	2	3	4	Total
Colts	0	6	17	7	30
Titans	14	3	0	10	27

at LP Field, Nashville, Tennessee

- Date: November 14
- Game time: 8:25 p.m. EST/7:25 p.m. CST
- Game weather: 44 °F (7 °C), clear
- Game attendance: 69,143
- Referee: Mike Carey
- TV announcers (NFLN): Brad Nessler (play-by-play), Mike Mayock (color commentator) and Alex Flanagan (sideline reporter)
- Recap, Game book

Game information

First quarter

- TEN – 11:36 Chris Johnson 30-yard TD run, Rob Bironas kick. Drive 8 plays, 80 yards, 3:24. (TEN 7–0)
- TEN – 4:06 Chris Johnson 7-yard TD run, Rob Bironas kick. Drive 11 plays, 68 yards, 5:51. (TEN 14–0)

Second quarter

- IND – 11:26 Adam Vinatieri 48-yard FG. Drive 13 plays, 65 yards, 7:40. (TEN 14–3)
- TEN – 2:32 Rob Bironas 25-yard FG. Drive 11 plays, 73 yards, 6:09. (TEN 17–3)
- IND – 0:00 Adam Vinatieri 30-yard FG. Drive 12 plays, 68 yards, 2:02. (TEN 17–6)

Third quarter

- IND – 8:33 Donald Brown 6-yard TD run, Adam Vinatieri kick. Drive 11 plays, 74 yards, 6:27. (TEN 17–13)
- IND – 7:36 Andrew Luck 11-yard TD run, Adam Vinatieri kick. Drive 2 plays, 20 yards, 0:51. (IND 20–17)
- IND – 1:27 Adam Vinatieri 50-yard FG. Drive 9 plays, 26 yards, 3:49. (IND 23–17)

Fourth quarter

- TEN – 11:39 Rob Bironas 38-yard FG. Drive 11 plays, 40 yards, 4:48. (IND 23–20)
- IND – 3:01 Donald Brown 11-yard TD run, Adam Vinatieri kick. Drive 11 plays, 74 yards, 4:40. (IND 30–20)
- TEN – 1:54 Delanie Walker 19-yard TD pass from Ryan Fitzpatrick, Rob Bironas kick. Drive 4 plays, 80 yards, 1:07. (IND 30–27)

Top passers

- IND – Andrew Luck: 23/36, 232 yards, 1 rush TD
- TEN – Ryan Fitzpatrick: 22/28, 222 yards, 1 TD

Top rushers

- IND – Donald Brown: 14 carries, 80 yards, 2 TD
- TEN – Chris Johnson: 17 carries, 86 yards, 2 TD

Top receivers

- IND – Coby Fleener: 8 receptions, 107 yards
- TEN – Delanie Walker: 10 receptions, 91 yards, 1 TD

Top tacklers

- IND – Pat Angerer: 8 tackles, 1 assist
- TEN – Colin McCarthy: 10 tackles, 2 assists

==== Week 12: at Arizona Cardinals ====
Week Twelve: Indianapolis Colts at Arizona Cardinals – Game summary

Quarter	1	2	3	4	Total
Colts	3	0	0	8	11
Cardinals	7	20	7	6	40

at University of Phoenix Stadium, Glendale, Arizona

- Date: November 24
- Game time: 4:05 p.m. EST/2:05 p.m. MST
- Game weather: Played indoors (retractable roof closed)
- Game attendance: 60,882
- Referee: Bill Leavy
- TV announcers (CBS): Ian Eagle (play-by-play) and Dan Fouts (color commentator)
- Recap, Game book

Game information

First quarter

- ARI - 10:02 Larry Fitzgerald 4-yard TD pass from Carson Palmer, Jay Feely kick. Drive 10 plays, 80 yards, 4:58. (ARI 7–0)
- IND - 1:15 Adam Vinatieri 27-yard FG. Drive 9 plays, 71 yards, 4:23. (ARI 7–3)

Second quarter

- ARI - 13:29 Larry Fitzgerald 26-yard TD pass from Carson Palmer, Jay Feely kick. Drive 5 plays, 80 yards, 2:46. (ARI 14–3)
- ARI - 8:15 Jay Feely 48-yard FG. Drive 9 plays, 38 yards, 4:15. (ARI 17–3)
- ARI - 7:58 Karlos Dansby 22-yard interception return TD, Jay Feely kick. (ARI 24–3)
- ARI - 0:00 Jay Feely 50-yard FG. Drive 7 plays, 19 yards, 1:49. (ARI 27–3)

Third quarter

- ARI - 5:57 Rashard Mendenhall 5-yard TD run, Jay Feely kick. Drive 11 plays, 64 yards, 5:11. (ARI 34–3)

Fourth quarter

- IND - 10:26 Coby Fleener 17-yard TD pass from Andrew Luck, 2-point conversion successful (Andrew Luck to Darrius Heyward-Bey). Drive 11 plays, 84 yards, 4:22. (ARI 34–11)
- ARI - 7:20 Jay Feely 21-yard FG. Drive 7 plays, 36 yards, 3:06. (ARI 37–11)
- ARI - 2:17 Jay Feely 25-yard FG. Drive 7 plays, 33 yards, 3:40. (ARI 40–11)

Top passers

- IND – Andrew Luck: 20/39, 163 yards, 1 TD, 1 INT
- ARI – Carson Palmer: 26/37, 314 yards, 2 TDs

Top rushers

- IND – Dan Herron: 4 carries, 33 yards
- ARI – Rashard Mendenhall: 13 carries, 54 yards, 1 TD

Top receivers

- IND – T. Y. Hilton: 5 receptions, 38 yards
- ARI – Michael Floyd: 7 receptions, 104 yards

Top tacklers

- IND – Jerrell Freeman: 6 tackles, 2 assists
- ARI – Karlos Dansby: 5 tackles, 1 INT

==== Week 13: vs. Tennessee Titans ====
Week Thirteen: Tennessee Titans at Indianapolis Colts – Game summary

Quarter	1	2	3	4	Total
Titans	0	7	7	0	14
Colts	6	6	3	7	22

at Lucas Oil Stadium, Indianapolis, Indiana

- Date: December 1
- Game time: 1:00 p.m. EST
- Game weather: Played indoors (retractable roof closed)
- Game attendance: 65,502
- Referee: Walt Coleman
- TV announcers (CBS): Bill Macatee (play-by-play), Steve Beuerlein (color commentator) and Steve Tasker (sideline reporter)
- Recap, Game book

Game information

First quarter

- IND - 6:09 Adam Vinatieri 47-yard FG. Drive 12 plays, 59 yards, 6:09. (IND 3–0)
- IND - 2:33 Adam Vinatieri 48-yard FG. Drive 5 plays, 32 yards, 1:09. (IND 6–0)

Second quarter

- TEN - 13:13 Ryan Fitzpatrick 1-yard TD run, Rob Bironas kick. Drive 10 plays, 80 yards, 4:20. (TEN 7–6)
- IND - 10:26 Adam Vinatieri 45-yard FG. Drive 8 plays, 57 yards, 2:47. (IND 9–7)
- IND - 0:00 Adam Vinatieri 37-yard FG. Drive 5 plays, 45 yards, 0:26. (IND 12–7)

Third quarter

- TEN - 7:29 Chris Johnson 1-yard TD pass from Ryan Fitzpatrick, Rob Bironas kick. Drive 14 plays, 80 yards, 7:31. (TEN 14–12)
- IND - 2:33 Adam Vinatieri 49-yard FG. Drive 4 plays, 1 yard, 1:14. (IND 15–14)

Fourth quarter

- IND - 1:56 Donald Brown 4-yard TD run, Adam Vinatieri kick. Drive 11 plays, 92 yards, 6:12. (IND 22–14)

Top passers

- TEN – Ryan Fitzpatrick: 21/37, 201 yards, 1 TD, 3 INTs, 1 lost fumble
- IND – Andrew Luck: 17/32, 200 yards, 1 INT

Top rushers

- TEN – Chris Johnson: 18 carries, 69 yards
- IND – Donald Brown: 14 carries, 54 yards, 1 TD

Top receivers

- TEN – Kendall Wright: 6 receptions, 77 yards
- IND – T. Y. Hilton: 5 receptions, 46 yards

Top tacklers

- TEN – Zach Brown: 7 tackles, 1 assist, 1 sack
- IND – Jerrell Freeman: 5 tackles, 4 assists, 1 INT, 1 fumble recovery

==== Week 14: at Cincinnati Bengals ====
Week Fourteen: Indianapolis Colts at Cincinnati Bengals – Game summary

Quarter	1	2	3	4	Total
Colts	0	0	14	14	28
Bengals	7	7	14	14	42

at Paul Brown Stadium, Cincinnati, Ohio

- Date: December 8
- Game time: 1:00 p.m. EST
- Game weather: 25 °F (−4 °C), cloudy, chance of snow
- Game attendance: 62,507
- Referee: Jeff Triplette
- TV announcers (CBS): Greg Gumbel (play-by-play) and Dan Dierdorf (color commentator)
- Recap, Game book

Game information

First quarter

- CIN - Marvin Jones 29-yard pass from Andy Dalton (Mike Nugent kick), 8:03. Bengals 7-0. Drive: 10 plays, 83 yards, 5:02.

Second quarter

- CIN - BenJarvus Green-Ellis 1-yard rush (Mike Nugent kick), 1:06. Bengals 14-0. Drive: 8 plays, 66 yards, 3:54.

Third quarter

- CIN - BenJarvus Green-Ellis 1-yard rush (Mike Nugent kick), 10:41. Bengals 21-0. Drive: 9 plays, 80 yards, 4:19.
- IND - Da'Rick Rogers 69-yard pass from Andrew Luck (Adam Vinatieri kick), 9:57. Bengals 21-7. Drive: 3 plays, 74 yards, 0:44.
- IND - LaVon Brazill 19 yard pass from Andrew Luck (Adam Vinatieri kick), 6:20. Bengals 21-14. Drive: 3 plays, 48 yards, 1:02.
- CIN - Jermaine Gresham 1 yard pass from Andy Dalton (Mike Nugent kick), 3:05. Bengals 28-14. Drive: 6 plays, 60 yards, 3:15.

Fourth quarter

- CIN - A. J. Green 9 yard pass from Andy Dalton (Mike Nugent kick), 13:25. Bengals 35-14. Drive: 7 plays, 59 yards, 3:25.
- IND - LaVon Brazill 29 yard pass from Andrew Luck (Adam Vinatieri kick), 9:48. Bengals 35-21. Drive: 8 plays, 75 yards, 3:37.
- CIN - Andy Dalton 8 yard run (Mike Nugent kick), 4:03. Bengals 42-21. Drive: 5 plays, 29 yards, 3:15.

Top passers

- IND – Andrew Luck – 29/46, 326 yards, 4 TD
- CIN – Andy Dalton – 24/35, 275 yards, 3 TD

Top rushers

- IND – Andrew Luck – 2 rushes, 32 yards
- CIN – Giovani Bernard – 12 rushes, 99 yards

Top receivers

- IND – Da'Rick Rogers – 6 receptions, 107 yards, 2 TD
- CIN – A. J. Green – 6 receptions, 72 yards, 1 TD

Top tacklers

- IND – Antoine Bethea – 17 tackles
- CIN – Vontaze Burfict – 8 tackles

With the loss, the Colts dropped to 8–5, however, they clinched the AFC South division title after the Broncos defeated the Titans later in the evening.

==== Week 15: vs. Houston Texans ====
Week Fifteen: Houston Texans at Indianapolis Colts – Game summary

Quarter	1	2	3	4	Total
Texans	3	0	0	0	3
Colts	7	13	5	0	25

at Lucas Oil Stadium, Indianapolis, Indiana

- Date: December 15
- Game time: 1:00 p.m. EST
- Game weather: Played indoors (retractable roof closed)
- Game attendance: 65,470
- Referee: Jerome Boger
- TV announcers (CBS): Kevin Harlan (play-by-play) and Solomon Wilcots (color commentator)
- Recap, Game book

Game information

First quarter

- IND – 9:31 Griff Whalen 14-yard pass from Andrew Luck, Adam Vinatieri kick. Drive 11 plays, 80 yards, 5:29. (IND 7–0)
- HOU – 1:46 Randy Bullock 49-yard FG. Drive 7 plays, 32 yards, 2:27. (IND 7–3)

Second quarter

- IND – 12:00 Adam Vinatieri 37-yard FG. Drive 4 plays, −2 yards, 1:29. (IND 10–3)
- IND – 7:03 Trent Richardson 9-yard pass from Andrew Luck, Adam Vinatieri kick. Drive 4 plays, 70 yards, 2:11. (IND 17–3)
- IND – 1:44 Adam Vinatieri 43-yard FG. Drive 6 plays, 19 yards, 1:11. (IND 20–3)

Third quarter

- IND – 12:27 Adam Vinatieri 40-yard FG. Drive 4 plays, 6 yards, 1:08. (IND 23–3)
- IND – 1:53 Duane Brown tackled in end zone by Cory Redding for a safety. (IND 25–3)

Fourth quarter No scoring

Top passers

- HOU – Case Keenum: 18/34, 168 yards, 2 INT
- IND – Andrew Luck: 19/32, 180 yards, 2 TD, 1 INT

Top rushers

- HOU – Ben Tate: 16 carries, 72 yards
- IND – Trent Richardson: 19 carries, 64 yards, 1 receiving TD

Top receivers

- HOU – Ryan Griffin: 6 receptions, 62 yards
- IND – T. Y. Hilton: 8 receptions, 78 yards

Top tacklers

- HOU – Joe Mays: 5 tackles, 8 assists
- IND – LaRon Landry: 8 tackles, 1 assist

With the win, the Colts improved to 9–5 and 12–0 at home against the Texans.

==== Week 16: at Kansas City Chiefs ====
Week Sixteen: Indianapolis Colts at Kansas City Chiefs – Game summary

Quarter	1	2	3	4	Total
Colts	0	13	10	0	23
Chiefs	7	0	0	0	7

at Arrowhead Stadium, Kansas City, Missouri

- Date: December 22
- Game time: 1:00 p.m. EST/12:00 p.m. CST
- Game weather: 22 °F (−6 °C), cloudy
- Game attendance: 75,396
- Referee: Tony Corrente
- TV announcers (CBS): Greg Gumbel (play-by-play) and Dan Dierdorf (color commentator)
- Recap, Game book

Game information

First quarter

- KC – 11:05 Jamaal Charles 31-yard TD run, Ryan Succop kick. Drive 4 plays, 59 yards, 1:48. (KC 7–0)

Second quarter

- IND – 11:40 Adam Vinatieri 46-yard FG. Drive 9 plays, 52 yards, 4:59. (KC 7–3)
- IND – 9:23 Donald Brown 33 yard pass from Andrew Luck, Adam Vinatieri kick. Drive 2 plays, 33 yards, 0:16. (IND 10–7)
- IND – 1:54 Adam Vinatieri 45-yard FG. Drive 11 plays, 57 yards, 5:42. (IND 13–7)

Third quarter

- IND – 12:55 Donald Brown 51-yard TD run, Adam Vinatieri kick. Drive 2 plays, 56 yards, 0:57. (IND 20–7)
- IND – 2:47 Adam Vinatieri 30-yard FG. Drive 15 plays, 59 yards, 7:50. (IND 23–7)

Fourth quarter No scoring

Top passers

- IND – Andrew Luck: 26/37, 241 yards, 1 TD
- KC – Alex Smith: 16/29, 153 yards, 2 INT, 1 lost fumble

Top rushers

- IND – Donald Brown: 10 carries, 79 yards, 1 rush TD, 1 receiving TD
- KC – Jamaal Charles: 13 carries, 106 yards, 1 rush TD

Top receivers

- IND – Griff Whalen: 7 receptions, 80 yards
- KC – Dwayne Bowe: 5 receptions, 46 yards

Top tacklers

- IND – Jerrell Freeman: 4 tackles, 1 assist, 1 sack, 1 interception, 1 forced fumble, 1 fumble recovery
- KC – Akeem Jordan: 7 tackles, 1 assist

==== Week 17: vs. Jacksonville Jaguars ====
Week Seventeen: Jacksonville Jaguars at Indianapolis Colts – Game summary

Quarter	1	2	3	4	Total
Jaguars	0	3	0	7	10
Colts	17	3	7	3	30

at Lucas Oil Stadium, Indianapolis, Indiana

- Date: December 29
- Game time: 1:00 p.m. EST
- Game weather: Played indoors (retractable roof closed)
- Game attendance: 66,008
- Referee: Pete Morelli
- TV announcers (CBS): Bill Macatee (play-by-play) and Steve Tasker (color commentator)
- Recap, Game book

Game information

First quarter

- IND – 10:45 Donald Brown 1-yard TD run, Adam Vinatieri kick. Drive 8 plays, 42 yards, 3:08. (IND 7–0)
- IND – 7:30 Trent Richardson 2-yard TD run, Adam Vinatieri kick. Drive 7 plays, 54 yards, 2:20. (IND 14–0)
- IND – 1:22 Adam Vinatieri 23-yard FG. Drive 12 plays, 74 yards, 4:27. (IND 17–0)

Second quarter

- JAC – 11:55 Josh Scobee 37-yard FG. Drive 11 plays, 41 yards, 4:27. (IND 17–3)
- IND – 0:00 Adam Vinatieri 26-yard FG. Drive 6 plays, 31 yards, 0:53. (IND 20–3)

Third quarter

- IND – 10:39 Griff Whalen 7-yard TD pass from Andrew Luck, Adam Vinatieri kick. Drive 7 plays, 80 yards, 4:21. (IND 27–3)

Fourth quarter

- IND – 8:00 Adam Vinatieri 39-yard FG. Drive 7 plays, 43 yards, 3:49. (IND 30–3)
- JAC – 0:16 Kerry Taylor 14-yard TD pass from Chad Henne, Josh Scobee kick. Drive 9 plays, 91 yards, 1:36. (IND 30–10)

Top passers

- JAC – Chad Henne: 30/51, 331 yards, 1 TD, 1 INT
- IND – Andrew Luck: 26/37, 282 yards, 1 TD

Top rushers

- JAC – Maurice Jones-Drew: 13 carries, 39 yards, 1 fumble lost
- IND – Donald Brown: 12 carries, 31 yards, 1 TD

Top receivers

- JAC – Kerry Taylor: 8 receptions, 75 yards, 1 TD
- IND – T. Y. Hilton: 11 receptions, 155 yards

Top tacklers

- JAC – Paul Posluszny: 6 tackles, 3 assists
- IND – Darius Butler: 6 tackles, 2 assists, 1 fumble recovery

With the win, the Colts were the only team during the 2013 season to sweep all of their division rivals.

== Standings ==
=== Division ===
AFC South
	W	L	T	PCT	DIV	CONF	PF	PA	STK
^{(4)} Indianapolis Colts	11	5	0	.688	6–0	9–3	391	336	W3
Tennessee Titans	7	9	0	.438	2–4	6–6	362	381	W2
Jacksonville Jaguars	4	12	0	.250	3–3	4–8	247	449	L3
Houston Texans	2	14	0	.125	1–5	2–10	276	428	L14

=== Conference ===
AFC
#	Team	Division	W	L	T	PCT	DIV	CONF	SOS	SOV	STK
Division winners
1	Denver Broncos	West	13	3	0	.813	5–1	9–3	.469	.423	W2
2	New England Patriots	East	12	4	0	.750	4–2	9–3	.473	.427	W2
3 (Note: Cincinnati defeated Indianapolis head-to-head (Week 14, 42–28).)	Cincinnati Bengals	North	11	5	0	.688	3–3	8–4	.480	.494	W2
4	Indianapolis Colts	South	11	5	0	.688	6–0	9–3	.484	.449	W3
Wild cards
5	Kansas City Chiefs	West	11	5	0	.688	2–4	7–5	.445	.335	L2
6	San Diego Chargers	West	9	7	0	.563	4–2	6–6	.496	.549	W4
Did not qualify for the postseason
7 (Note: Pittsburgh finished with a better division record than Baltimore.) (Note: Pittsburgh defeated the New York Jets head-to-head (Week 6, 19–6).)	Pittsburgh Steelers	North	8	8	0	.500	4–2	6–6	.469	.441	W3
8 (Note: Baltimore defeated the New York Jets head-to-head (Week 12, 19–3).)	Baltimore Ravens	North	8	8	0	.500	3–3	6–6	.484	.418	L2
9 (Note: The New York Jets finished with a better division record than Miami.)	New York Jets	East	8	8	0	.500	3–3	5–7	.488	.414	W2
10	Miami Dolphins	East	8	8	0	.500	2–4	7–5	.523	.523	L2
11	Tennessee Titans	South	7	9	0	.438	2–4	6–6	.504	.375	W2
12	Buffalo Bills	East	6	10	0	.375	3–3	5–7	.520	.500	L1
13 (Note: Oakland and Jacksonville finished with a better conference record than Cleveland.) (Note: Oakland defeated Jacksonville head-to-head (Week 2, 19–9).)	Oakland Raiders	West	4	12	0	.250	1–5	4–8	.523	.359	L6
14 (Note: Jacksonville defeated Cleveland head-to-head (Week 13, 32–28).)	Jacksonville Jaguars	South	4	12	0	.250	3–3	4–8	.504	.234	L3
15	Cleveland Browns	North	4	12	0	.250	2–4	3–9	.516	.477	L7
16	Houston Texans	South	2	14	0	.125	1–5	2–10	.559	.500	L14
Tiebreakers (Note: When breaking ties for three or more teams under the NFL's rules, they are first broken within divisions, then comparing only the highest ranked remaining team from each division.)

== Postseason ==
=== Schedule ===
Round	Date	Opponent (seed)	Result	Record	Venue	Recap
Wild Card	January 4	Kansas City Chiefs (5)	W 45–44	1–0	Lucas Oil Stadium	Recap
Divisional	January 11	at New England Patriots (2)	L 22–43	1–1	Gillette Stadium	Recap

=== Game summaries ===
==== AFC Wild Card Playoffs: vs. (5) Kansas City Chiefs ====
AFC Wild Card Playoffs: (5) Kansas City Chiefs at (4) Indianapolis Colts – Game summary

Quarter	1	2	3	4	Total
Chiefs	10	21	10	3	44
Colts	7	3	21	14	45

at Lucas Oil Stadium, Indianapolis, Indiana

- Date: January 4, 2014
- Game time: 4:35 p.m. EST
- Game weather: Played indoors (retractable roof closed)
- Game attendance: 63,551
- Referee: Walt Anderson
- TV announcers (NBC): Dan Hicks (play-by-play), Mike Mayock (color commentator) and Alex Flanagan (sideline reporter)
- Recap, Game book

Game information

First quarter

- KC - 8:11 Dwayne Bowe 6-yard TD pass from Alex Smith, Ryan Succop kick. Drive 14 plays, 82 yards, 6:49. (KC 7–0)
- IND - 4:34 T. Y. Hilton 10-yard TD pass from Andrew Luck, Adam Vinatieri kick. Drive 7 plays, 74 yards, 3:37. (tied 7–7)
- KC - 0:53 Ryan Succop 19-yard FG. Drive 7 plays, 73 yards, 3:41. (KC 10–7)

Second quarter

- KC - 14:39 Donnie Avery 79-yard TD pass from Alex Smith, Ryan Succop kick. Drive 3 plays, 79 yards, 0:21. (KC 17–7)
- KC - 13:05 Anthony Sherman 5-yard TD pass from Alex Smith, Ryan Succop kick. Drive 3 plays, 17 yards, 1:23. (KC 24–7)
- IND - 9:14 Adam Vinatieri 37-yard FG. Drive 12 plays, 61 yards, 3:51. (KC 24–10)
- KC - 1:51 Knile Davis 4-yard TD run, Ryan Succop kick. Drive 15 plays, 81 yards, 7:23. (KC 31–10)

Third quarter

- KC - 13:39 Knile Davis 10-yard TD pass from Alex Smith, Ryan Succop kick. Drive 3 plays, 18 yards, 1:15. (KC 38–10)
- IND - 11:47 Donald Brown 10-yard TD run, Adam Vinatieri kick. Drive 5 plays, 80 yards, 1:52. (KC 38–17)
- IND - 7:32 Donald Brown 3-yard TD pass from Andrew Luck, Adam Vinatieri kick. Drive 5 plays, 41 yards, 1:28. (KC 38–24)
- KC - 4:12 Ryan Succop 42-yard FG. Drive 4 plays, 4 yards, 1:32. (KC 41–24)
- IND - 2:31 Coby Fleener 12-yard TD pass from Andrew Luck, Adam Vinatieri kick. Drive 6 plays, 80 yards, 4:02. (KC 41–31)

Fourth quarter

- IND - 10:38 Andrew Luck 5-yard fumble recovery for a TD, Adam Vinatieri kick. Drive 12 plays, 90 yards, 4:02. (KC 41–38)
- KC - 5:36 Ryan Succop 43-yard FG. Drive 11 plays, 58 yards, 5:02. (KC 44–38)
- IND - 4:21 T. Y. Hilton 64-yard TD pass from Andrew Luck, Adam Vinatieri kick. Drive 4 plays, 80 yards, 1:15. (IND 45–44)

Top passers

- KC – Alex Smith: 30/46, 378 yards, 4 TDs, 1 lost fumble
- IND – Andrew Luck: 29/45, 443 yards, 4 TDs, 3 INTs, 1 fumble recovery TD

Top rushers

- KC – Knile Davis: 18 carries, 67 yards, 1 rushing TD, 1 receiving TD
- IND – Donald Brown: 11 carries, 55 yards, 1 rushing TD, 1 receiving TD

Top receivers

- KC – Dwayne Bowe: 8 receptions, 150 yards, 1 TD
- IND – T. Y. Hilton: 13 receptions, 224 yards, 2 TDs

Top tacklers

- KC – Eric Berry: 7 tackles, 2 assists, 1 forced fumble
- IND – Antoine Bethea: 8 tackles, 1 assist, 1 pass defended

==== AFC Divisional Playoffs: at (2) New England Patriots ====
AFC Divisional Playoffs: (4) Indianapolis Colts at (2) New England Patriots – Game summary

Quarter	1	2	3	4	Total
Colts	7	5	10	0	22
Patriots	14	7	8	14	43

at Gillette Stadium, Foxborough, Massachusetts

- Date: January 11, 2014
- Game time: 8:10 p.m. EST
- Game weather: 57 °F (14 °C), rain and wind
- Game attendance: 68,756
- Referee: Pete Morelli
- TV announcers (CBS): Greg Gumbel (play-by-play), Dan Dierdorf (color commentator) and Allie LaForce (sideline reporter)
- Recap, Gamebook

Game information

First quarter

- NE – LeGarrette Blount 2-yard run (Stephen Gostkowski kick), 13:41. Patriots 7–0. Drive: 1 play, 2 yards, 0:04.
- NE – LeGarrette Blount 2-yard run (Stephen Gostkowski kick), 7:17. Patriots 14–0. Drive: 10 plays, 74 yards, 5:03.
- IND – LaVon Brazill 38-yard pass from Andrew Luck (Adam Vinatieri kick), 4:35. Patriots 14–7. Drive: 7 plays, 80 yards, 2:42.

Second quarter

- NE – LeGarrette Blount 2-yard run (Stephen Gostkowski kick), 10:54. Patriots 21–7. Drive: 14 plays, 75 yards, 6:28.
- IND – Adam Vinatieri 36-yard field goal, 5:35. Patriots 21–10. Drive: 11 plays, 62 yds, 5:19.
- IND – Ryan Allen fumble declared dead in endzone for a safety, 2:18. Patriots 21–12.

Third quarter

- IND – Adam Vinatieri 21-yard field goal, 10:03. Patriots 21–15. Drive: 8 plays, 60 yards, 3:27.
- NE – Stevan Ridley 3-yard run (2-pt conv. – Stevan Ridley run), 6:18. Patriots 29–15. Drive: 9 plays, 88 yards, 3:45.
- IND – LaVon Brazill 35-yard pass from Andrew Luck (Adam Vinatieri kick), 5:01. Patriots 29–22. Drive: 3 plays, 80 yards, 1:17.

Fourth quarter

- NE – LeGarrette Blount 73-yard run (Stephen Gostkowski kick), 12:55. Patriots 36–22. Drive: 1 play, 73 yards, 0:13.
- NE – Stevan Ridley 1-yard run (Stephen Gostkowski kick), 11:12. Patriots 43–22. Drive: 5 plays, 18 yards, 1:33.

Top passers

- IND – Andrew Luck – 20/41, 331 yards, 2 TD, 4 INT
- NE – Tom Brady – 13/25, 198 yards

Top rushers

- IND – Donald Brown – 17 rushes, 63 yards
- NE – LeGarrette Blount – 24 rushes, 166 yards, 4 TD

Top receivers

- IND – T. Y. Hilton – 4 rec, 103 yards
- NE – Julian Edelman – 6 rec, 84 yards
