= NFL Matchup =

- Genre: Sports
- Starring: Sal Paolantonio; Darius Butler; Greg Cosell
- Country of origin: United States

Production
- Running time: approx. 21 minutes
- Production company: NFL Films

Original release
- Network: ESPN
- Release: September 5, 1993 – present

NFL Matchup is a National Football League (NFL) preview show that airs every week during the regular season and playoffs. At various times, the official name was based on the current sponsor in the format [Sponsor Name] NFL Matchup. Since 2017, it is known simply as the ESPN NFL Matchup, and it is produced utilizing commentary and footage from NFL Films.

During the 2008–09 NFL season, it aired every Sunday during the season on ESPN at 3:00am Eastern time (ET), then re-aired at 7:30am ET. Over the years the air-times have varied, typically with an initial showing on ESPN2 on Saturday morning, and the show being re-aired Sunday morning on ESPN. In 2019, it began airing on ESPN2 sometime around 6:30 to 7:00AM ET on Saturday, depending on other programming, then re-aired on Sundays twice on ESPN, with the first showing, depending on other programming, at 3:00 to 4:00AM ET, and the second showing typically at 6:30AM ET. Additional special air-times take place during the playoffs and for other specially scheduled NFL games.

== Format ==
Unlike Sunday NFL Countdown, NFL Primetime, Monday Night Countdown, NFL Insiders, and NFL Live, NFL Matchup gives fans an in-depth look at the NFL by breaking down the strategy and tactics—the "X's and O's", after the symbols commonly used by coaches to diagram plays—of every pro football game. The program's analysts do this through the exclusive use of team-supplied coaching footage, the same video coaches and players use each week to prepare game plans and strategy.

== History ==
The show started in 1984 as Monday Night Matchup with Chris Berman as host with Allie Sherman, former Giants coach, and Steve Sabol of NFL Films providing analysis.

From 1993 to 2003, it was hosted by Mark Malone, SportsCenter anchor Stuart Scott and finally, ESPN sideline reporter Suzy Kolber, who became the first woman to host an NFL show.

Since the 2004 season Sunday NFL Countdown and SportsCenter correspondent Sal Paolantonio has served as the host. Alongside him were Ron Jaworski and Merril Hoge. Jaworski, who also appeared on ESPN's Sunday NFL Countdown, joined ESPN in 1990 after a 17-year career as a quarterback, most notably with the Philadelphia Eagles. The show fits Jaworski style of breaking down the X's and O's of the football gridiron game.

Hoge joined ESPN in 1996, where he serves as an analyst on NFL Live and ESPNews Football Friday, as well as NFL Matchup. He is a former fullback and an eight-year veteran, serving five of those years as a starter for the Pittsburgh Steelers. Television tape was used until 1994, when game film was used.

The program converted to a high-definition presentation for the 2011 season, though some game footage camera angles (which are mainly used internally by coaching staffs, and rarely by television networks during game broadcasts except in a few circumstances) remained provided to ESPN by the NFL in standard definition for a short while after. With Jim Rome is Burning, which ended at the end of January 2012 never converting to HD, NFL Matchup was both the final ESPN program to convert to HD and the last still utilizing some SD presentation outside of rare SportsCenter highlights still in that format.

After both Jaworski and Hoge were laid off by the network in April 2017, ESPN NFL insider Louis Riddick and Greg Cosell, the original co-creator of the show, were named the new co-hosts of the program.

In 2018, Riddick was replaced by Matt Bowen.

== Personalities ==
=== Current ===
- Sal Paolantonio: (Host, 2004–present)
- Darius Butler: (Analyst, 2022–present)
- Greg Cosell: (Analyst, 2017–present)

=== Former ===
- Chris Berman: (Host, 1984–1987)
- Matt Bowen: (Analyst, 2018–2021)
- Merril Hoge: (Analyst, 1998–2016)
- Ron Jaworski: (Analyst, 1990–2016)
- Suzy Kolber: (Host, 1999–2003)
- Mark Malone: (Host, 1998)
- Charles Mann: (Analyst)
- Chris Myers (–1997)
- Louis Riddick: (Analyst, 2017)
- Steve Sabol: (Analyst, 1984–?)
- John Saunders (Host, 1988)
- Charley Steiner (Host, 1989–1992)
- Allie Sherman: (Analyst, 1984–1992)
- Stuart Scott: (Host, –1998)
- Phil Simms: (Analyst)

== See also ==
- Monday Night Countdown
- Monday Night Football
- NFL Insiders
- NFL Live
- NFL Primetime
- Sunday NFL Countdown
