= Josh Lenz =

American football player (born 1990)

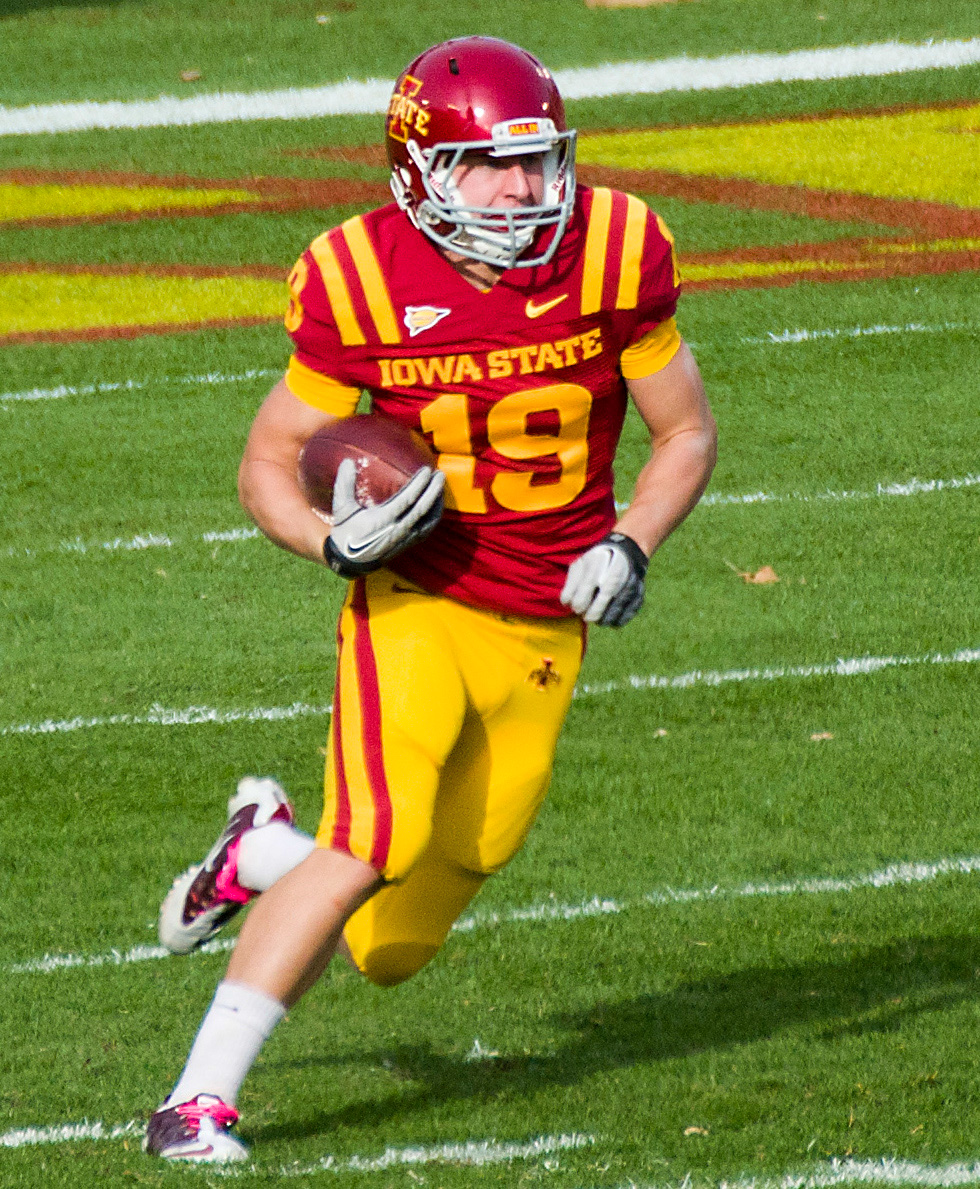
- Lenz playing for Iowa State in 2011

No. 19
- Position: Wide receiver

Personal information
- Born: September 22, 1990 (age 36); Dubuque, Iowa, U.S.
- Listed height: 6 ft 0 in (1.83 m)
- Listed weight: 194 lb (88 kg)

Career information
- High school: Hempstead (Dubuque, Iowa)
- College: Iowa State (2009–2012)
- NFL draft: 2013: undrafted

Career history
- Chicago Bears (2013)*; Seattle Seahawks (2013)*; Indianapolis Colts (2013–2014); Cleveland Browns (2015)*; Houston Texans (2015–2016)*
- * Offseason or practice squad member only
- Stats at Pro Football Reference

Joshua Lenz (born September 22, 1990) is a former American football wide receiver. He played college football at Iowa State, and signed with the Chicago Bears as an undrafted free agent in 2013. He spent several years in the NFL on practice squads, only ever being on the active roster with the Indianapolis Colts.

== College career ==
Lenz played for Iowa State. In 4 seasons with the Cyclones, he recorded 96 receptions for 1,213 yards and 10 touchdowns.

== Professional career ==
=== Pro Day ===
Lenz (5-foot-11 1/4, 201) was not invited to the Combine, but put himself on the draft radar with forty times of 4.36 and 4.37 at the ISU Pro Day. He added a 38.5-inch vertical and 10-foot-1 broad jump.

=== Chicago Bears ===
Lenz signed as an undrafted free agent with the Chicago Bears on April 28, 2013. He was mostly used as a punt returner in preseason football and was released on August 31, after totaling seven punt returns for 60 yards and one lost fumble.

=== Seattle Seahawks ===
On October 8, 2013, Lenz was signed to the practice squad of the Seattle Seahawks. He was released on October 22 to make room for Ricardo Lockette. Lenz was then re-signed to the practice squad on October 30, and was released again on November 6, this time to make room for Phil Bates.

=== Indianapolis Colts ===
Lenz was signed to the Indianapolis Colts practice squad on November 11, 2013, when Da'Rick Rogers was promoted to the active roster. On January 6, 2014, Lenz was promoted to the active roster for the first time in his career. After playing in the 2014 preseason, Lenz was released and re-signed to the practice squad on August 31. Lenz was waived by the Colts on May 20, 2015.

=== Cleveland Browns ===
On May 30, 2015, Lenz signed with the Cleveland Browns. On September 5, he was waived by the Browns.

=== Houston Texans ===
Lenz signed to the practice squad of the Houston Texans on October 13, 2015. He signed a future deal on January 13, 2016. On August 30, Lenz was waived by the Texans.
