= Greg Toler =

American football player (born 1985)

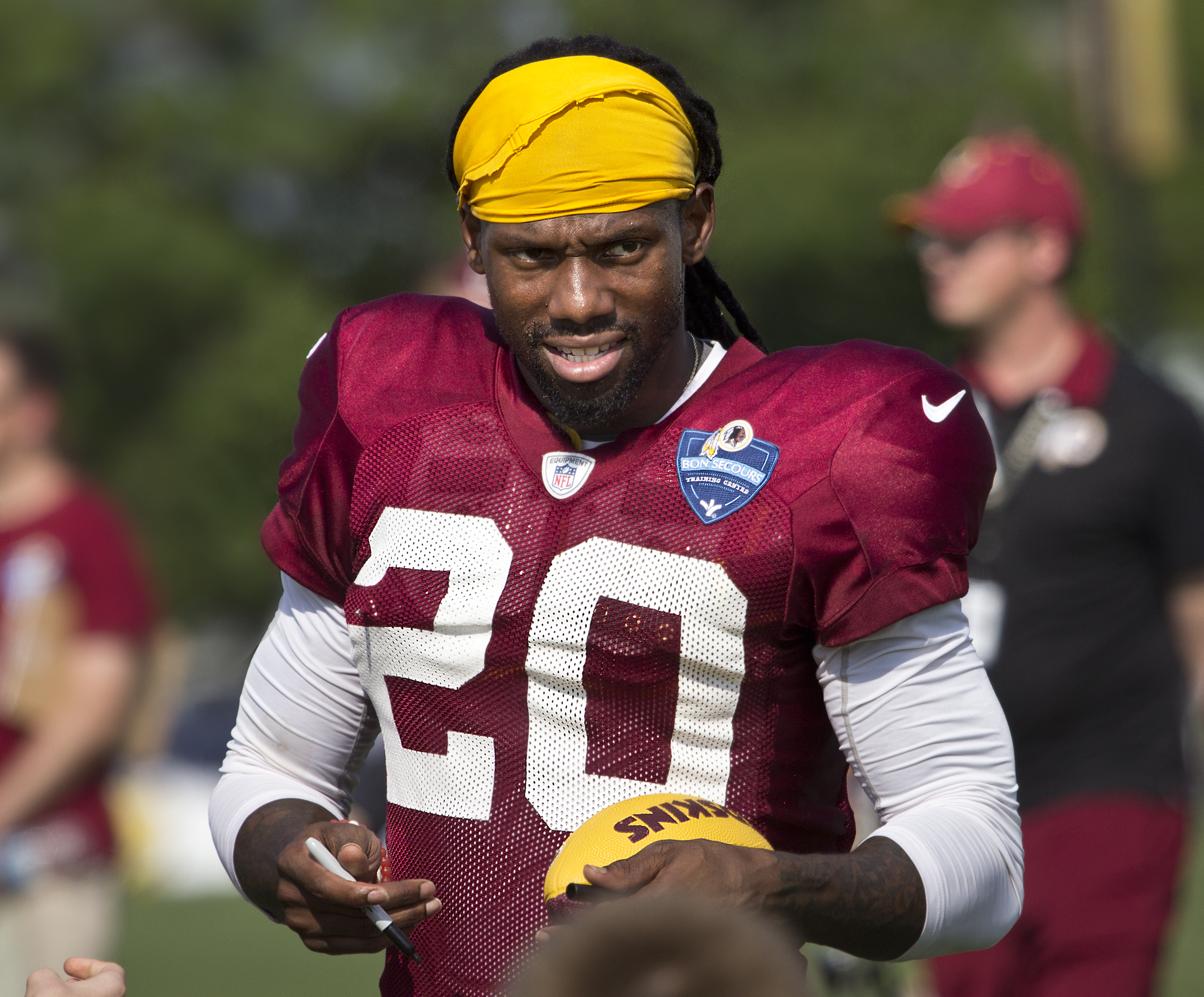
- Toler with the Washington Redskins in 2016

No. 28, 20
- Position: Cornerback

Personal information
- Born: January 2, 1985 (age 41); Washington, D.C., U.S.
- Listed height: 6 ft 0 in (1.83 m)
- Listed weight: 180 lb (82 kg)

Career information
- High school: Northwestern (Hyattsville, Maryland)
- College: Saint Paul's (VA)
- NFL draft: 2009: 4th round, 131st overall pick

Career history
- Arizona Cardinals (2009–2012); Indianapolis Colts (2013–2015); Washington Redskins (2016)

Career NFL statistics
- Total tackles: 277
- Sacks: 2
- Forced fumbles: 4
- Fumble recoveries: 2
- Interceptions: 8
- Defensive touchdowns: 3
- Stats at Pro Football Reference

Greg Toler (born January 2, 1985) is an American former professional football player who was a cornerback in the National Football League (NFL). He played college football for the St. Paul's Tigers. He was selected by the Arizona Cardinals in the fourth round of the 2009 NFL draft. Toler was the first and last player from Saint Paul's College, a defunct Division II historically black college in Lawrenceville, Virginia, to be drafted into the NFL.

== Early life ==
He had a few scholarship offers in his senior year at Northwestern High School in Hyattsville, Maryland, but he didn't have the grades that were good enough to attend college. He was working at a local JCPenney and playing semi-pro football in the Washington, DC-Virginia-Maryland area for the DC Explosion (NAFL), when he was noticed by a coach who worked at Saint Paul's College, Virginia. Toler was eventually awarded a scholarship at Saint Paul's College. Toler made the Central Intercollegiate Athletic Association (CIAA) All-Conference team as a junior and senior.

== Professional career ==
=== Arizona Cardinals ===
Considered one of the most intriguing small-school prospects in the 2009 NFL draft, Toler was graded as the seventh-best cornerback available. He was selected in the fourth round, 131st overall, by the Cardinals, as the first and last St. Paul's Tiger selected in an NFL Draft. He missed the entire 2011 season due to a torn ACL.

=== Indianapolis Colts ===
Toler signed with the Indianapolis Colts on March 12, 2013. Toler was placed on injured reserve on January 6, 2014, after suffering a groin injury during the Colts 45–44 Wild Card win over the Kansas City Chiefs.

=== Washington Redskins ===
On April 13, 2016, Toler signed a one-year contract with the Washington Redskins.

== NFL career statistics ==
Legend
	Led the league
**Bold**	Career high

=== Regular season ===
Year	Team	Games		Tackles					Interceptions					Fumbles			
Year	Team	GP	GS	Cmb	Solo	Ast	Sck	TFL	Int	Yds	TD	Lng	PD	FF	FR	Yds	TD
2009	ARI	13	0	11	10	1	0.0	0	1	0	0	0	2	0	0	0	0
2010	ARI	14	13	**90**	**82**	**8**	**1.0**	**2**	**2**	66	**1**	66	9	**2**	**1**	0	0
2012	ARI	11	2	27	26	1	0.0	1	**2**	**102**	**1**	**102**	9	0	0	0	0
2013	IND	9	7	23	17	6	0.0	0	1	26	0	26	7	0	0	0	0
2014	IND	15	**15**	57	49	**8**	**1.0**	**2**	**2**	47	**1**	47	**10**	1	0	0	0
2015	IND	10	10	51	44	7	0.0	0	0	0	0	0	**10**	1	0	0	0
2016	WAS	**16**	2	18	15	3	0.0	0	0	0	0	0	2	0	**1**	0	0
Career		88	49	277	243	34	2.0	5	8	241	3	102	49	4	2	0	0

=== Playoffs ===
Year	Team	Games		Tackles					Interceptions					Fumbles			
Year	Team	GP	GS	Cmb	Solo	Ast	Sck	TFL	Int	Yds	TD	Lng	PD	FF	FR	Yds	TD
2009	ARI	2	0	12	11	1	0.0	0	0	0	0	0	2	0	0	0	0
2013	IND	1	1	2	2	0	0.0	0	0	0	0	0	0	0	0	0	0
2014	IND	**3**	**3**	**18**	**16**	**2**	0.0	**1**	0	0	0	0	**4**	0	0	0	0
Career		6	4	32	29	3	0.0	1	0	0	0	0	6	0	0	0	0
