= Sal Paolantonio =

Sports announcer (born 1956)

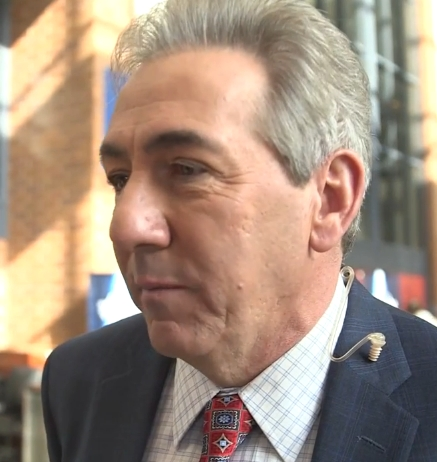
- Paolantonio in 2015
- Education: SUNY Oneonta; New York University
- Occupation: Sports Reporter
- Employer: ESPN
- Notable credits: Current: ESPN; 97.5 The Fanatic; Previous: Professor, St. Joseph's University; The Philadelphia Inquirer
- Television: SportsCenter; Sunday NFL Countdown; NFL Live; Fantasy Football Now; NFL Matchup
- Title: National Correspondent
- Board member of: Cooper University Hospital Foundation
- Spouse: Lynn McGraw
- Awards: See Below
- Military career
- Allegiance: United States
- Branch: (United States Navy) Navy
- Service years: 1978–1983
- Rank: Lieutenant
- Awards: United Nations Meritorious Service Medal
- Website: ESPN Bio

Salvatore Anthony Nicholas Paolantonio is a Philadelphia-based bureau reporter for ESPN. Since joining ESPN in 1995, Paolantonio has become a staple in their NFL coverage, as he contributes to shows such as SportsCenter, NFL Live, Sunday NFL Countdown (from a game site) and Monday Night Countdown (from the Monday Night Football site). In 2004, he added studio work to his duties, replacing Suzy Kolber as the host of NFL Matchup, an X's and O's football show; joining him are Louis Riddick and Greg Cosell. His best known work for ESPN was his coverage of the Terrell Owens saga with the Philadelphia Eagles during the 2004 and 2005 seasons. Paolantonio has also been an adjunct professor at St. Joseph's University in Philadelphia since 2001.

== Early life ==
A native of Stewart Manor, New York, Paolantonio attended Sewanhaka High School.

He graduated from the State University of New York at Oneonta in 1977 with a Bachelor of Arts degree in history. He also attended New York University, where he received a master's degree in journalism in 1978. Paolantonio served as a Surface Warfare officer in the United States Navy from 1979 to 1983 where he was awarded the United Nations Medal in 1983. He served aboard USS Ouellet and the USS Haleakala.

== Career ==
Prior to joining ESPN, he was a political reporter and Philadelphia Eagles beat reporter for The Philadelphia Inquirer from 1993 to 1995. During that time he also served as a reporter for WPHL-TV nightly news show, Inquirer News Tonight and hosted Saturday Morning Sports Page on WIP sports radio. In 1993, he published his first book, a biography of Frank L. Rizzo entitled The Last Big Man in Big City America.

In 2018, he published Philly Special: The Inside Story of How the Philadelphia Eagles Won Their First Super Bowl Championship. In 2007, he and fellow sports journalist Reuben Frank put out The Paolantonio Report: The Most Overrated and Underrated Players, Teams, Coaches, and Moments in NFL History. It has been the best-selling NFL book in the country (October 11, 2007) according to Amazon.com. He went on to make the provocative claim in his 2008 folk history, How Football Explains America, that the competition informed the public morality on integration and consciously developed in the mid-20th century into an almost mythic spectacle. With its origins in the closing of the Turnerian frontier, the NFL league, rather than baseball, apparently broke down the color barrier in sports.

== Personal life ==
Paolantonio has been a resident of Haddon Township, New Jersey. He later moved to nearby Moorestown.

== Awards ==
- Associated Press Managing Editor's Award for Enterprise Reporting
  1985
- Associated Press Sports Editors Award for Reporting
  1994
- Philadelphia Magazine Philadelphia's Best Sportswriter
  1995
- New York Daily News Jack Newfield Courage in Journalism Award
  2017
