= Jerrell Freeman =

American football player (born 1986)

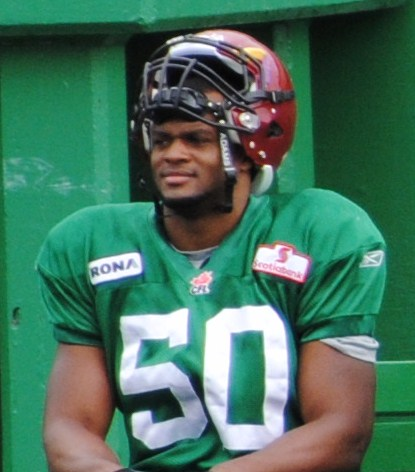
- Freeman with the Saskatchewan Roughriders in 2010

No. 50
- Position: Linebacker

Personal information
- Born: May 1, 1986 (age 40); Waco, Texas, U.S.
- Listed height: 6 ft 0 in (1.83 m)
- Listed weight: 236 lb (107 kg)

Career information
- High school: University (Waco)
- College: Mary Hardin–Baylor (2004–2007)
- NFL draft: 2008: undrafted

Career history
- Tennessee Titans (2008)*; Saskatchewan Roughriders (2009–2011); Indianapolis Colts (2012–2015); Chicago Bears (2016–2017)
- * Offseason or practice squad member only

Awards and highlights
- Norm Fieldgate Trophy (2011); CFL All-Star (2011); CFL West All-Star (2011); D3Football.com Defensive Player of the Year (2007)

Career NFL statistics
- Total tackles: 597
- Sacks: 12.0
- Interceptions: 4
- Forced fumbles: 8
- Fumble recoveries: 3
- Defensive touchdowns: 2
- Stats at Pro Football Reference

Career CFL statistics
- Total tackles: 144
- Sacks: 13
- Interceptions: 3
- Stats at CFL.ca (archived)

Jerrell Alexander Freeman (born May 1, 1986) is an American former professional football player who was a linebacker in the National Football League (NFL) and Canadian Football League (CFL). He played college football for the Mary Hardin–Baylor Crusaders and was signed as an undrafted free agent by the Tennessee Titans of the NFL in 2008. He then played three seasons in the CFL for the Saskatchewan Roughriders, where he led the league in tackles in 2011. In 2012, he signed with the NFL's Indianapolis Colts, and also later played for the Chicago Bears.

== College career ==
Freeman played four seasons of collegiate football for the Mary Hardin-Baylor Crusaders under Pete Fredenburg. He was twice named a D3football.com All-American, including being honored as the 2007 D3Football.com Defensive Player of the Year. When he left, he was the school's all-time leading tackler. As a senior, he had 59 tackles, 18 tackles for a loss, and six quarterback sacks.

== Professional career ==
=== Tennessee Titans ===
Although Freeman was not selected in the 2008 NFL draft he was signed by the Tennessee Titans immediately following the conclusion of the draft. He became the first Mary Hardin-Baylor Crusader to reach the NFL. Freeman was released by the Titans prior to the start of the 2008 NFL season.

=== Saskatchewan Roughriders ===
In March 2009, Freeman signed with the Saskatchewan Roughriders of the CFL. In the 2009 CFL season, Freeman was used primarily as a special teams tackler, recording a team high 25 special teams tackles. He was nominated as the team's Most Outstanding Rookie. In his second season with the Riders, Freeman saw more time as a regular linebacker. He made the starting lineup for one game in the regular season and started in two playoff games and the Grey Cup. Jerrell Freeman won CFL Defensive Player of the Week honors in week 7 after recording three sacks against the BC Lions. He led the team in sacks by the end of the season with seven.

The 2011 season was a breakout year for Freeman. Freeman lead the CFL in tackles with 106. Freeman won CFL Defensive Player of the Week in week 10 and earned CFL Defensive Player of the Month for the month of September.

=== Indianapolis Colts ===
In January 2012, Freeman signed with the Indianapolis Colts of the NFL. In Week 1 against the Chicago Bears, Freeman returned a Jay Cutler interception for a touchdown in the first quarter. Freeman had an outstanding first season with the Colts finishing with 145 tackles (90 solo and 55 assisted) and two sacks. His 145 tackles was the fifth highest total in the league. Freeman won the AFC Defensive Player of the Week award for his performance in a 23–7 win over the Kansas City Chiefs on December 22, 2013. He finished the game with seven tackles, one quarterback sack, one forced fumble, one interception, and three passes defended. He was also initially credited with two interceptions, but one was later adjusted to a strip/sack for teammate Robert Mathis and a fumble recovery for Freeman. In the 2013 season, he had 5.5 sacks, 126 total tackles, two interceptions, six passes defended, six forced fumbles, and two fumble recoveries. In 2014, he recorded 95 combined tackles, six pass deflections, and one forced fumble in 12 games played. On March 5, 2015, the Colts made a qualifying offer to Freeman, which he signed on April 27. In Week 17 of the 2015 season, Freeman had a 23-yard interception return for a touchdown in the 30–24 victory over the Tennessee Titans. In the 2015 season, he finished with three sacks, 112 total tackles, one interception, two passes defended, and one fumble recovery in 13 games and starts.

=== Chicago Bears ===
On March 12, 2016, Freeman signed a three-year, $12 million contract with the Chicago Bears. He was suspended four games on November 21, 2016, for violating the league's performance-enhancing drug policy. In the 2016 season, he appeared in 12 games and finished with 110 total tackles (86 solo) and five passes defended.

On September 12, 2017, Freeman was placed on injured reserve after sustaining a pectoral injury and a concussion in Week 1 against the Atlanta Falcons.

On October 30, the Chicago Bears announced that Freeman had been suspended for 10 games for violating the NFL's performance-enhancing drug policy for a second time. Freeman apologized for the suspension, adding that his playing career might be in jeopardy due to a head injury and memory loss.

On May 2, 2018, Freeman announced his retirement from the NFL. He was suspended an additional two years by the NFL on May 11, 2018, after failing a third drug test.

== Career stats ==
=== Regular season ===
Season	Team	Games		Tackles						Interceptions					Fumbles
Season	Team	GP	GS	Comb	Total	Ast	Sck	SFTY	PDef	Int	Yds	Avg	Lng	TDs	FF
2012	IND	16	16	145	90	55	2.0	–	2	1	4	4.0	4T	1	1
2013	IND	16	16	126	83	43	5.5	–	6	2	13	6.5	13	0	6
2014	IND	12	12	95	58	37	1.5	–	6	–	–	–	–	–	1
2015	IND	13	13	112	66	46	3.0	–	2	1	23	23.0	23T	1	0
2016	CHI	12	12	110	86	24	0.0	–	4	–	–	–	–	–	–
2017	CHI	1	1	10	7	3	0	0	0	0	0	0	0	0	0
Total		70	70	598	390	208	12.0	0	20	4	40	10.0	23	2	8

=== Postseason ===
Season	Team	Games		Tackles						Interceptions					Fumbles
Season	Team	GP	GS	Comb	Total	Ast	Sck	SFTY	PDef	Int	Yds	Avg	Lng	TDs	FF
2012	IND	1	1	4	3	1	–	–	–	–	–	–	–	–	–
2013	IND	2	1	18	10	8	–	–	1	–	–	–	–	–	–
2014	IND	2	2	22	10	12	1.5	–	–	–	–	–	–	–	1
	Total	5	4	44	23	21	1.5	0	1	0	0	0.0	0	0	1
