= Da'Rick Rogers =

American football player (born 1991)

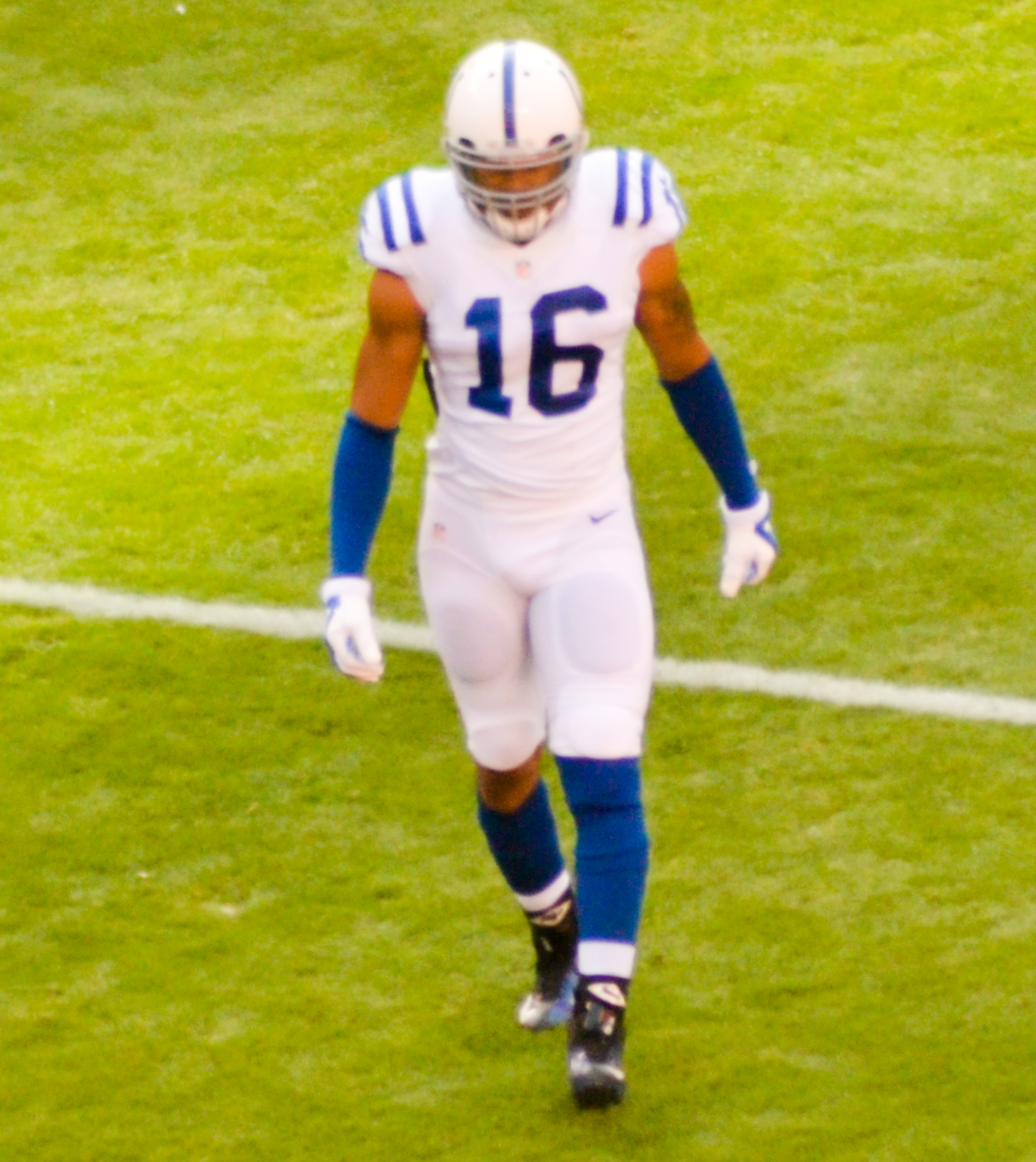

No. 16
- Position: Wide receiver

Personal information
- Born: June 18, 1991 (age 35); Atlanta, Georgia, U.S.
- Listed height: 6 ft 3 in (1.91 m)
- Listed weight: 215 lb (98 kg)

Career information
- High school: Calhoun (GA)
- College: Tennessee (2010–2011); Tennessee Tech (2012)
- NFL draft: 2013: undrafted

Career history
- Buffalo Bills (2013)*; Indianapolis Colts (2013–2014); Kansas City Chiefs (2015)*; Toronto Argonauts (2016–2017); Saskatchewan Roughriders (2018)*
- * Offseason or practice squad member only

Awards and highlights
- First-team All-SEC (2011); OVC All-Newcomer Team (2012)

Career NFL statistics
- Receptions: 14
- Receiving yards: 192
- Receiving average: 13.7
- Receiving touchdowns: 2
- Stats at Pro Football Reference

Da'Rick Jamal Rogers (born June 18, 1991) is an American former professional football player who was a wide receiver in the National Football League (NFL). He played college football for the Tennessee Volunteers and Tennessee Tech Golden Eagles, and signed with the Buffalo Bills as an undrafted free agent in 2013.

== Early life ==
Rogers was born in Atlanta, Georgia. He initially attended Darlington School in Rome, Georgia, before transferring to Calhoun High School after his sophomore year. During his junior year, he had 66 receptions for 1,300 yards and 11 touchdowns, helping lead Calhoun to the Class AA finals. As a senior, he had 84 receptions and 22 touchdowns, and set a single-season state record with 1,647 receiving yards, again helping Calhoun reach the state finals. Following his senior season, Rogers was named to MaxPreps.com's Small Schools All-American Team, as well as Georgia's "All-Decade Team" for the 2000s.

Rogers was ranked as the second best wide receiver recruit, and the ninth best overall recruit, by Rivals.com in 2010, and was labelled a 5-star recruit by both Rivals and Scout. He originally committed to the Georgia Bulldogs, but in February 2010 switched his commitment to the Tennessee Volunteers, where he joined Calhoun teammate Nash Nance. In the days following his decommitment, Rogers engaged in a war of words on Twitter with Georgia safety Bacarri Rambo.

== College career ==
As a true freshman in 2010, Rogers played in all 13 games for the Tennessee Volunteers. He finished the season with 11 receptions for 167 yards and two touchdowns. He had 117 rushing yards on 16 attempts, and returned 12 kickoffs for 298 yards. As a sophomore in 2011, he started all 12 games, and led the SEC in both receptions (67) and receiving yards (1,040). He was second in the conference in touchdowns with nine. At the end of the season, he was named a first-team All-SEC selection. On August 23, 2012, it was announced that Da'Rick Rogers had been suspended from the Tennessee Volunteers indefinitely for a violation of team rules, though no specific reason was publicly announced. Rogers subsequently admitted to failing three drug tests while at Tennessee.

After his suspension at Tennessee, Rogers transferred to Tennessee Tech. On September 22, 2012, Rogers caught 18 passes for 303 yards in Tennessee Tech's loss to Southeast Missouri State, setting single-game school records for receptions and receiving yards. In his lone season at Tennessee Tech, he caught 61 passes for 893 yards and 10 touchdowns. He also passed 10 drug tests. Following the 2012 season, Rogers was awarded the "Elite Wide Receiver Award" by the College Football Performance Awards for his efforts in the 2011 and 2012 seasons.

== Professional career ==
=== Pre-draft ===
On December 14, 2012, Tennessee Tech announced that Rogers would forgo his senior year and enter the NFL draft.

At the 2013 NFL Combine, Rogers turned out one of the best overall performances, finishing in the top five in several categories, including the 3 cone drill, the 20-yard shuttle, the 60-yard shuttle, the vertical jump, and the broad jump.

Pre-draft measurables
Height	Weight	Arm length	Hand span	40-yard dash	10-yard split	20-yard split	20-yard shuttle	Three-cone drill	Vertical jump	Broad jump	Bench press
6 ft 2 1/2 in (1.89 m)	217 lb (98 kg)	32 3/4 in (0.83 m)	9 1/2 in (0.24 m)	4.52 s	1.61 s	2.64 s	4.06 s	6.71 s	39.5 in (1.00 m)	11 ft 0 in (3.35 m)	10 reps
All values from NFL Combine

=== Buffalo Bills ===
Rogers went undrafted in the 2013 NFL draft. He signed a free agent contract with the Buffalo Bills hours after the draft. On May 10, 2013, Rogers participated in his first day of Rookie Minicamp with the Bills. Rogers was released by Buffalo on August 26.

=== Indianapolis Colts ===
Rogers signed with the Indianapolis Colts practice squad on September 2, 2013. He was promoted to the active roster on September 19, but was waived just a few days later on September 24, and re-signed to the practice squad on September 25. Rogers was again called up to the Colts' active roster on November 11. Rogers made his NFL debut on December 1, against the Tennessee Titans, playing 13 snaps but was not targeted for a pass. On December 8, in a road game against the Cincinnati Bengals, he recorded six catches for 107 yards and two touchdowns.

Rogers was released from the Colts on September 29, 2014, after it was announced he had been arrested for driving under the influence (DUI).

=== Kansas City Chiefs ===
Rogers signed a reserve/future contract with the Kansas City Chiefs on January 7, 2015. He was released by Kansas City on June 16.

=== Toronto Argonauts ===
On April 11, 2016, Rogers signed with the Toronto Argonauts of the Canadian Football League.

== Career statistics ==
Season	Team	Games		Receiving					Rushing					Fumbles	
Season	Team	GP	GS	Rec	Yds	Avg	Lng	TD	Att	Yds	Avg	Lng	TD	FUM	Lost
2013	Indianapolis Colts	5	3	14	192	13.7	69T	2	1	0	0.0	0	0	–	–
	Total	5	3	14	192	13.7	69	2	1	0	0.0	0	0	0	0
