= Darius Butler =

American football player (born 1986)

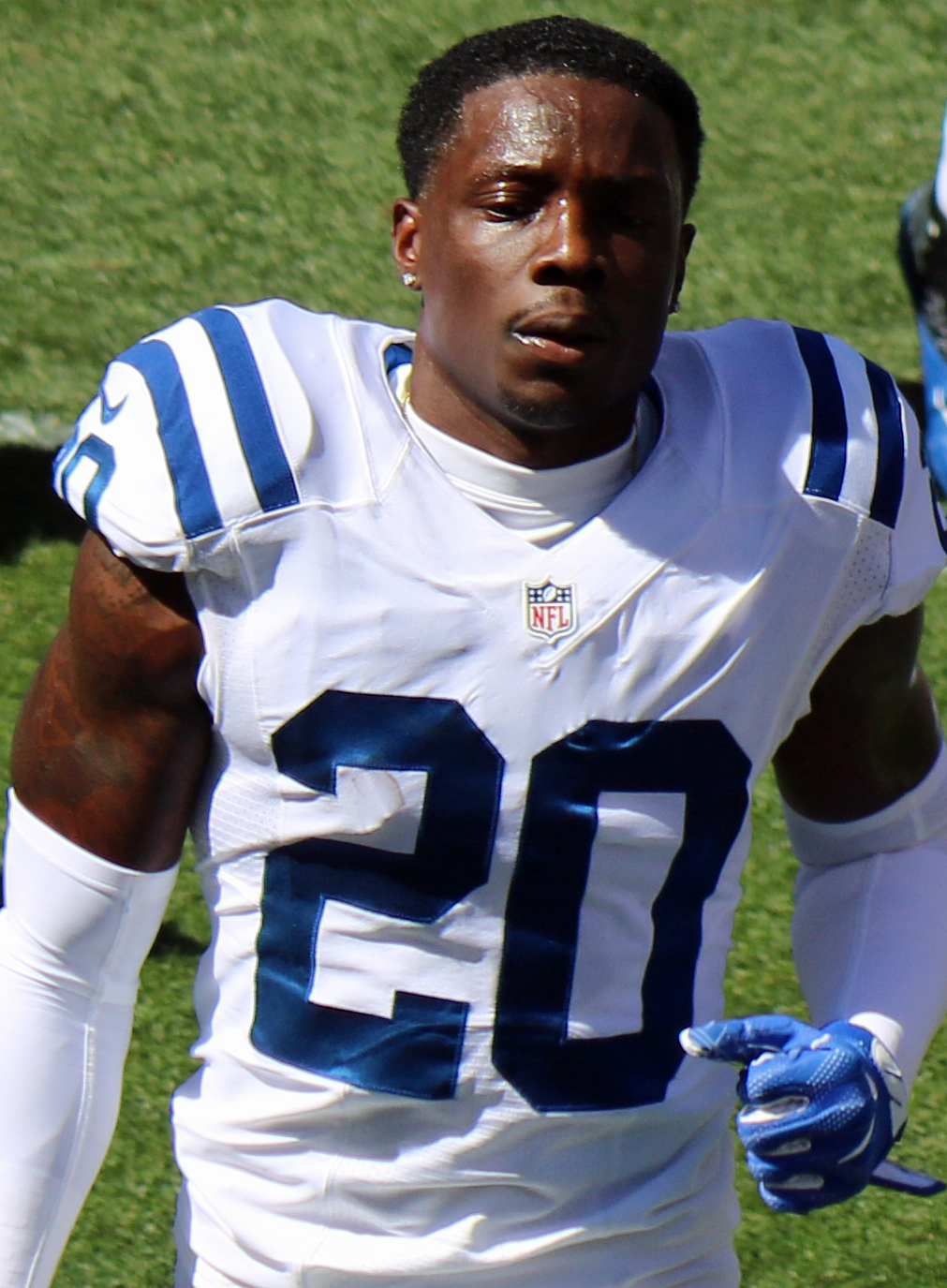
- Butler with the Indianapolis Colts in 2016

No. 28, 27, 20
- Positions: Safety, cornerback

Personal information
- Born: March 18, 1986 (age 40); Frankfurt, Germany
- Listed height: 5 ft 10 in (1.78 m)
- Listed weight: 192 lb (87 kg)

Career information
- High school: Coral Springs Charter (Coral Springs, Florida, U.S.)
- College: Connecticut
- NFL draft: 2009: 2nd round, 41st overall pick

Career history
- New England Patriots (2009–2010); Carolina Panthers (2011); Indianapolis Colts (2012–2017)

Awards and highlights
- First-team All-Big East (2008)

Career NFL statistics
- Total tackles: 334
- Forced fumbles: 9
- Fumble recoveries: 5
- Pass deflections: 65
- Interceptions: 15
- Total touchdowns: 4
- Stats at Pro Football Reference

Darius Jermaine Butler (born March 18, 1986) is an American sports television personality and former professional football player who was a safety and cornerback for nine seasons in the National Football League (NFL), primarily with the Indianapolis Colts. He played college football for the Connecticut Huskies and was selected by the New England Patriots in the second round of the 2009 NFL draft. He has also played for the Carolina Panthers. Butler began his career as a cornerback and switched to safety in 2016.

== Early life ==
Butler was born in Frankfurt, Germany and lived there for three years while his father was stationed there with the US Military. Butler attended Coral Springs Charter School in Coral Springs, Florida. While there he played quarterback and safety. In addition to football, Butler also ran track and played basketball, scoring over 1,000 points during his career. He was an All-County selection as well as an All-State honorable mention.

== College career ==
Butler played college football at the University of Connecticut, where he was a four-year starter and two-year team captain. He was primarily a cornerback, but he also spent time as a kickoff returner and wide receiver.

Butler was twice named Big East Player of the Week, both during his freshman year in 2005. He earned Big East Defensive Player of the Week after intercepting three passes for 122 interception return yards and a touchdown in a game against Army on October 1, 2005. The 122 return yards set both a Connecticut and Michie Stadium record. He also was awarded Big East Special Teams Player of the Week after he returned a kick off 90 yards for a touchdown against South Florida on November 26, 2005. After his senior season in 2008, Butler was named to the All-Big East first-team, despite not having a single interception all season.

Butler finished his career at Connecticut starting 43 of 45 games, recording 180 tackles, 10 interceptions for 213 return yards and two touchdowns. He also scored three other touchdowns: one on a kickoff return, one rushing, and one receiving.

== Professional career ==
Pre-draft measurables
Height	Weight	Arm length	Hand span	40-yard dash	10-yard split	20-yard split	20-yard shuttle	Three-cone drill	Vertical jump	Broad jump	Wonderlic
5 ft 10 3/8 in (1.79 m)	183 lb (83 kg)	32 7/8 in (0.84 m)	9 1/2 in (0.24 m)	4.53 s	1.56 s	2.64 s	4.18 s	6.92 s	43.0 in (1.09 m)	11 ft 2 in (3.40 m)	24
All values from NFL Scouting Combine

=== New England Patriots ===
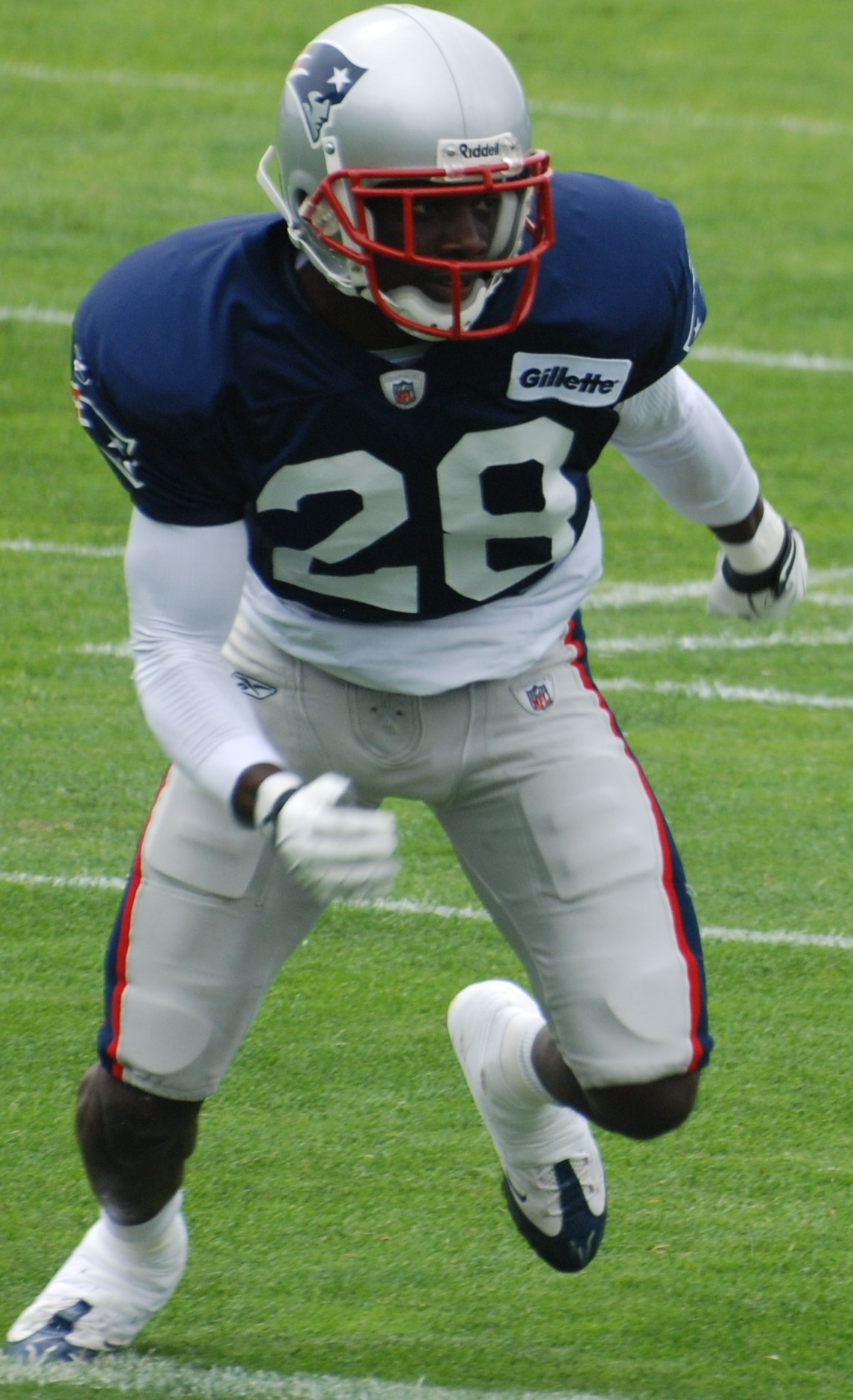
Butler at Patriots training camp in 2009.

Butler was selected by the New England Patriots in the second round (41st overall) of the 2009 NFL draft. On July 10, 2009, he signed a four-year contract with the Patriots that included a total of about $2.1 million in guaranteed money.

Butler got his first career start and interception against the Tennessee Titans. The following week, he got his second interception against the Tampa Bay Buccaneers. He returned an interception 91 yards for a touchdown against the Houston Texans on January 3, 2010. He finished the season starting five of 14 games played, recording three interceptions, 35 tackles, and eight passes deflected.

In 2010, Butler started the first two games of the season, including a Patriots loss to the New York Jets in Week 2. In the game, Butler gave up a touchdown reception and was also penalized twice for defensive pass interference on another Jets touchdown drive. He was replaced as a starter by Kyle Arrington the next week, and was not part of the team's defensive sub packages. After being a healthy inactive for the team's Week 10 game against the Pittsburgh Steelers, Butler returned to make his third start of the season, as the Patriots' nickel cornerback for their Week 13 win over the Jets. Butler finished the season with three starts in 15 games played, recording 23 tackles and six pass deflections.

On September 6, 2011, he was waived by New England.

=== Carolina Panthers ===
Butler was claimed off waivers by the Carolina Panthers on September 6, 2011. He would appear in 13 games for the Panthers, starting in 6 of them.

On August 31, 2012, Butler was waived by the Panthers.

=== Indianapolis Colts ===
Butler was signed as a free agent by the Indianapolis Colts on September 25, 2012.

On March 12, 2013, he was re-signed to a two-year contract. Butler signed a new contract extension worth $5 million over two years with the Colts on March 8, 2015. He was named the AFC Defensive Player of the Week for Week 9 of the 2015 NFL season, after recording two tackles, one interception, and one pass defensed in the Colts 27–24 win over the Denver Broncos.

Butler switched to safety in 2016, but reverted to cornerback during the season as injuries mounted for the Colts. He then chose to move back to safety in 2017.

On March 17, 2017, Butler re-signed with the Colts on a one-year deal worth $3 million. He played in 15 games with four starts at free safety for the Colts in 2017.

== NFL career statistics ==
Legend
**Bold**	Career high

=== Regular season ===
Year	Team	Games		Tackles					Interceptions					Fumbles			
Year	Team	GP	GS	Cmb	Solo	Ast	Sck	TFL	Int	Yds	TD	Lng	PD	FF	FR	Yds	TD
2009	NE	14	5	35	33	2	0.0	0	3	91	1	**91**	8	0	0	0	0
2010	NE	15	3	23	22	1	0.0	0	0	0	0	0	6	0	**1**	0	0
2011	CAR	13	6	32	27	5	0.0	0	0	0	0	0	7	0	0	0	0
2012	IND	11	4	31	22	9	0.0	0	**4**	**101**	**2**	51	7	1	**1**	0	0
2013	IND	**16**	**7**	**55**	**45**	10	0.0	**1**	**4**	79	1	41	**15**	0	**1**	0	0
2014	IND	14	4	46	41	5	0.0	**1**	0	0	0	0	7	**3**	**1**	7	0
2015	IND	14	2	50	38	**12**	0.0	**1**	1	0	0	0	4	2	0	0	0
2016	IND	12	**7**	33	27	6	0.0	0	3	19	0	19	7	1	0	0	0
2017	IND	15	4	29	23	6	0.0	0	0	0	0	0	4	2	**1**	**32**	0
		124	42	334	278	56	0.0	3	15	290	4	91	65	9	5	39	0

=== Playoffs ===
Year	Team	Games		Tackles					Interceptions					Fumbles			
Year	Team	GP	GS	Cmb	Solo	Ast	Sck	TFL	Int	Yds	TD	Lng	PD	FF	FR	Yds	TD
2009	NE	1	0	2	2	0	0.0	0	0	0	0	0	1	0	0	0	0
2010	NE	1	0	1	1	0	0.0	0	0	0	0	0	0	0	0	0	0
2012	IND	1	0	4	4	0	0.0	0	0	0	0	0	0	0	0	0	0
2013	IND	2	**1**	**9**	**5**	**4**	0.0	0	0	0	0	0	**2**	0	0	0	0
2014	IND	**3**	**1**	5	4	1	0.0	**1**	0	0	0	0	1	**1**	0	0	0
		8	2	21	16	5	0.0	1	0	0	0	0	4	1	0	0	0

== Media career ==
After regularly appearing on The Pat McAfee Show, Butler began hosting a new segment called "Everything DB" on Tuesdays, during the 2022 NFL season. For the 2023 NFL season, he appeared in-studio three days a week, from Monday to Wednesday. He has also featured on Good Morning Football, Up and Adams, The Herd with Colin Cowherd and NFL Matchup. Butler is the voice of the offensive coordinator in the virtual reality video game NFL Pro Era and is a playable character in WWE 2K24 as part of the "Pat McAfee Pack" DLC along with co-hosts of the Pat McAfee Show.

Butler hosts The Man to Man Podcast, alongside Antoine Bethea.

== Personal life ==
Butler is cousins with Willis McGahee, former Cincinnati Bengals defensive tackle Geno Atkins, and Green Bay Packers linebacker Randy Ramsey.

Butler has two daughters.
