= 2015 Cleveland Browns season =

67th season in Cleveland Browns franchise history

- Owner: Jimmy Haslam
- General manager: Ray Farmer
- Head coach: Mike Pettine
- Home stadium: FirstEnergy Stadium

Results
- Record: 3–13
- Division place: 4th AFC North
- Playoffs: Did not qualify
- Pro Bowlers: Alex Mack, C Joe Thomas, OT; Gary Barnidge, TE

Uniform
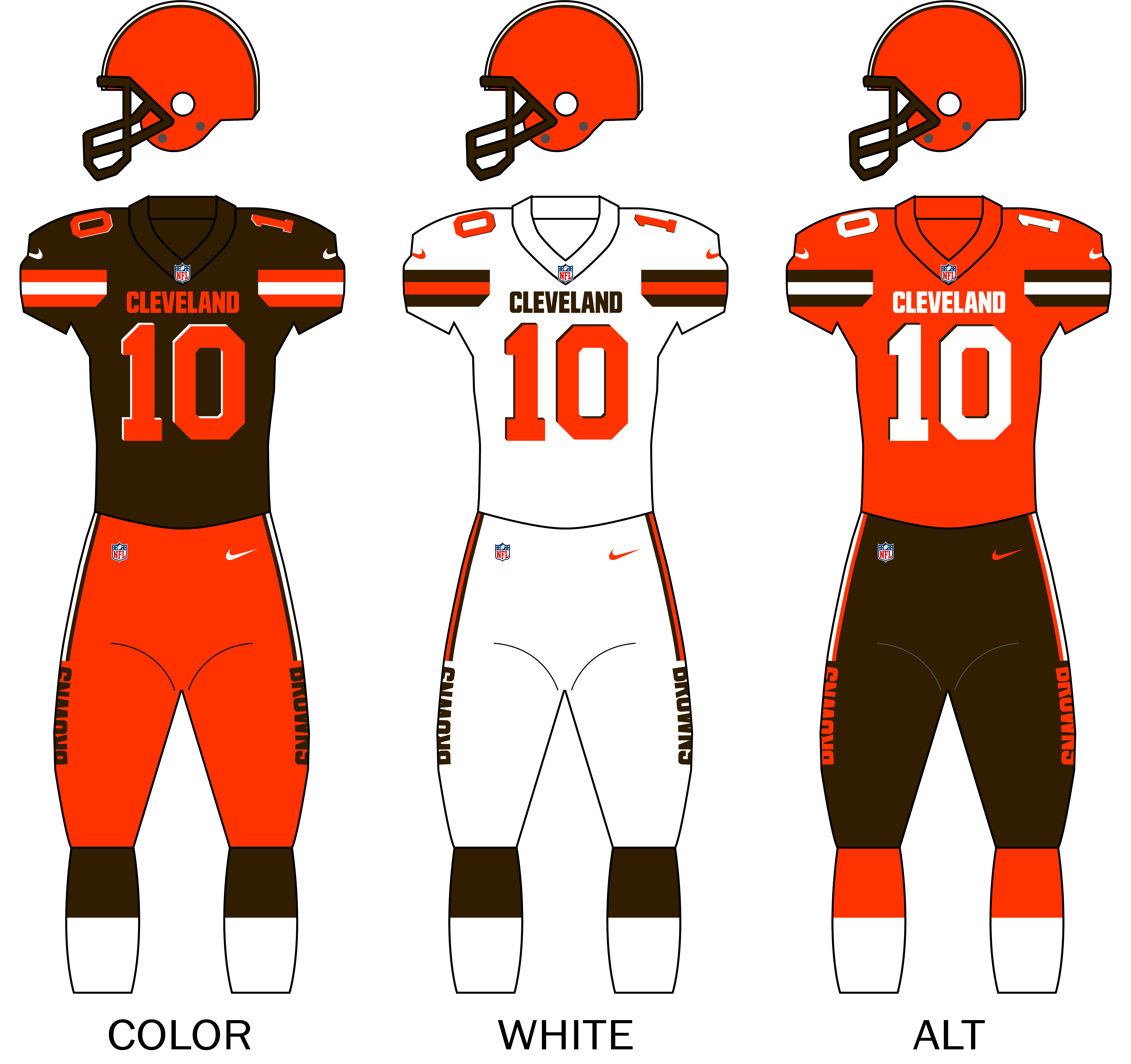

The 2015 season was the Cleveland Browns' 63rd in the National Football League (NFL), their 67th overall, and their second and final season under the head coach/general manager tandem of Mike Pettine and Ray Farmer. Both Pettine and Farmer were fired on January 3, 2016, after the team failed to improve on their 7–9 record from the previous season, going 3–13, tied with the Tennessee Titans for the worst record in the league. The Browns introduced new uniforms prior to the start of the season, updating the orange color to a darker hue, among other changes.

== Offseason ==
=== Personnel changes ===
On January 8, offensive coordinator Kyle Shanahan left the Browns due to disagreements about the quarterback Johnny Manziel's readiness to start. Quarterbacks coach Dowell Loggains was fired the same day. Notably, Loggains was instrumental in the team's drafting of Manziel in the 2014 NFL draft. On January 15, wide receivers coach Mike McDaniel left the Browns by mutual agreement.

On January 21, John DeFilippo was hired as the Browns’ new offensive coordinator. DeFilippo, who has been the Oakland Raiders’ quarterbacks coach for the past three seasons, replaces Kyle Shanahan, who resigned earlier in the month. After his first stint as the Raiders’ quarterbacks coach (2007–08), DeFilippo worked with HC Mike Pettine for one successful season with the New York Jets. Under DeFilippo's guidance, rookie quarterback Mark Sanchez showed enough poise to lead New York to the AFC Championship. Pettine was the Jets’ defensive coordinator that season.

On January 27, Joker Phillips was hired as wide receivers coach.

On January 31, Kevin O'Connell accepted the position of quarterbacks coach.

=== Roster changes ===
==== Free agents ====
Pos	Player	Tag	2015 Team	Signed
WR	Miles Austin	UFA	Philadelphia Eagles	March 31
SS	Johnson Bademosi	RFA	Cleveland Browns	April 23
TE	Jordan Cameron	UFA	Miami Dolphins	March 12
RB	Shaun Draughn	UFA	Cleveland Browns	March 6
QB	Brian Hoyer	UFA	Houston Texans	March 11
NT	Sione Fua	UFA	TBA	
FS	Tashaun Gipson	RFA	Cleveland Browns	
NT	Ishmaa'ily Kitchen	RFA	TBA	
P	Spencer Lanning	ERFA	Tampy Bay Buccaneers	March 6
SS	Jim Leonhard	UFA	Retired	
WR	Marlon Moore	UFA	Cleveland Browns	March 11
ILB	Craig Robertson	ERFA	Cleveland Browns	April 23
NT	Ahtyba Rubin	UFA	Seattle Seahawks	March 19
OT	Ryan Seymour	ERFA	Cleveland Browns	March 9
OLB	Jabaal Sheard	UFA	New England Patriots	March 11
CB	Buster Skrine	UFA	New York Jets	March 10
OLB	Scott Solomon	UFA	Cleveland Browns	Unknown
QB	Tyler Thigpen	UFA	TBA	

Players shaded in green re-signed with the Browns
UFA: Unrestricted free agent

RFA: Restricted free agent
ERFA: Exclusive rights free agent
FT: Player was designated with the franchise tag
TT: Player was designated with the transition tag

==== Releases ====
Pos	Player	Released	2015 Team	Signed
OL	Paul McQuistan	February 13		

==== Signings ====
Pos	Player	2014 Team	Signed
WR	Brian Hartline	Miami Dolphins	March 10
WR	Dwayne Bowe	Kansas City Chiefs	March 20
TE	Rob Housler	Arizona Cardinals	April 9
QB	Thad Lewis	Houston Texans	March 12
QB	Josh McCown	Tampa Bay Buccaneers	March 2
CB	Micah Pellerin	Dallas Cowboys	January 20
CB	Varmah Sonie	Tampa Bay Buccaneers	February 18
DE	Randy Starks	Miami Dolphins	March 16
CB	Tramon Williams	Green Bay Packers	March 16

==== 2015 draft class ====
2015 Cleveland Browns draft
Round	Selection	Player	Position	College
1	12	Danny Shelton	Defensive tackle	Washington
1	19	Cameron Erving	Guard	Florida State
2	51	Nate Orchard	Defensive end	Utah
3	77	Duke Johnson	Running back	Miami (Florida)
3	96	Xavier Cooper	Defensive tackle	Washington State
4	115	Ibraheim Campbell	Safety	Northwestern
4	123	Vince Mayle	Wide receiver	Washington State
6	189	Charles Gaines	Cornerback	Louisville
6	195	Malcolm Johnson	Fullback	Mississippi State
6	198	Randall Telfer	Tight end	USC
7	219	Hayes Pullard	Inside linebacker	USC
7	241	Ifo Ekpre-Olomu	Cornerback	Oregon

Notes

- The Browns acquired additional selections in the first (No. 19) and fourth (No. 111) rounds as part of a trade that sent the team's 2014 first-round selection to the Buffalo Bills.
- The Browns acquired an additional sixth-round (No. 202) selection in a trade that sent the team's 2014 seventh-round selection to the Baltimore Ravens.
- The Browns have traded picks in Round 2 (No. 51 for No. 43) with the Houston Texans for additional picks and upgrades in the later rounds in this years' draft (see above for updated selections). They also made swaps for higher picks with the Arizona Cardinals in rounds 4–7.

=== Gordon suspension ===
On January 25, it was announced that wide receiver Josh Gordon was facing a year-long suspension following a fifth failed drug test, this time for alcohol. This follows a ten-game suspension in 2014 for testing positive for marijuana. On February 3, the league imposed the suspension without pay for at least one year, possibly indefinitely. His earliest return would be training camp for the 2016 season.

=== Manziel enters rehab ===
On February 3, 2015, quarterback Johnny Manziel voluntarily entered a rehab facility for dependence on alcohol. He exited the facility on April 12, shortly prior to the beginning of offseason workouts.

=== GM Farmer suspension ===
In an incident widely dubbed as Textgate, it was announced on February 4 that the Browns faced sanctions amid allegations of text messages being sent from general manager Ray Farmer to coaches and coordinators during games during the 2014 season, a violation of NFL rules. On March 30, 2015 it was announced Ray Farmer was suspended for the first four games of the season without pay and the Browns were fined $250,000 for the incident. No loss of current or future draft picks were imposed.

=== Logo and uniform changes ===
The Browns introduced new logos on February 24. The helmet remains the primary logo, changing the team's orange color to a darker hue, and changing the facemask from gray to brown. The team also premiered a secondary logo, which is a simplistic helmet, and a new logo for the Dawg Pound.

On April 14, the Browns premiered nine new uniforms. There are three jersey colors and three pants colors: orange, brown, and white, allowing for nine possible uniform combinations. The uniforms have "Cleveland" above the numbers on the front, "Browns" down the leg, and "Dawg Pound" inside the collar. The uniforms are the first in the NFL to utilize contrast stitching and chainmail/raised numbers. The team name down the leg are also NFL firsts.

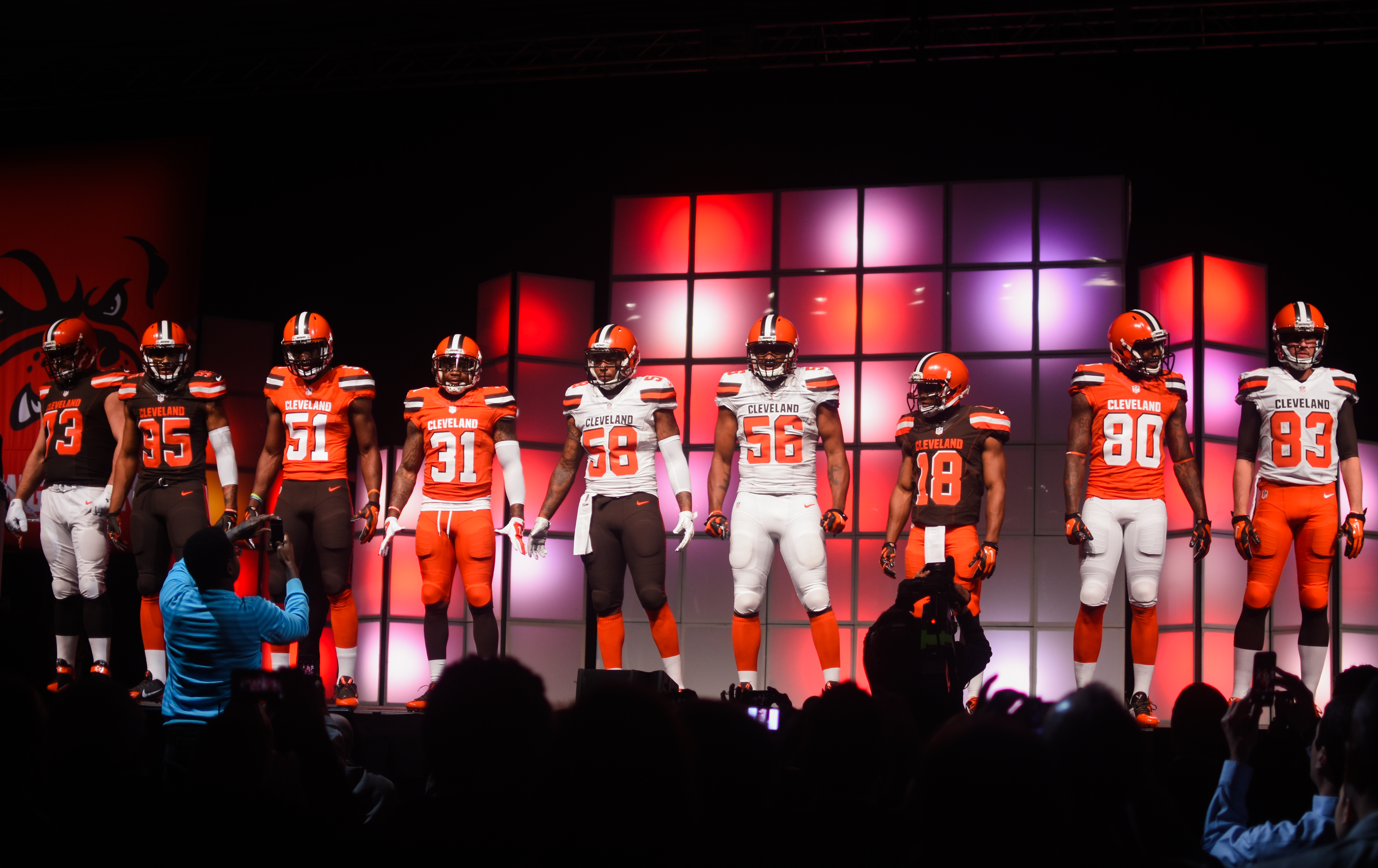
Players showing the nine possible jersey and pants combinations

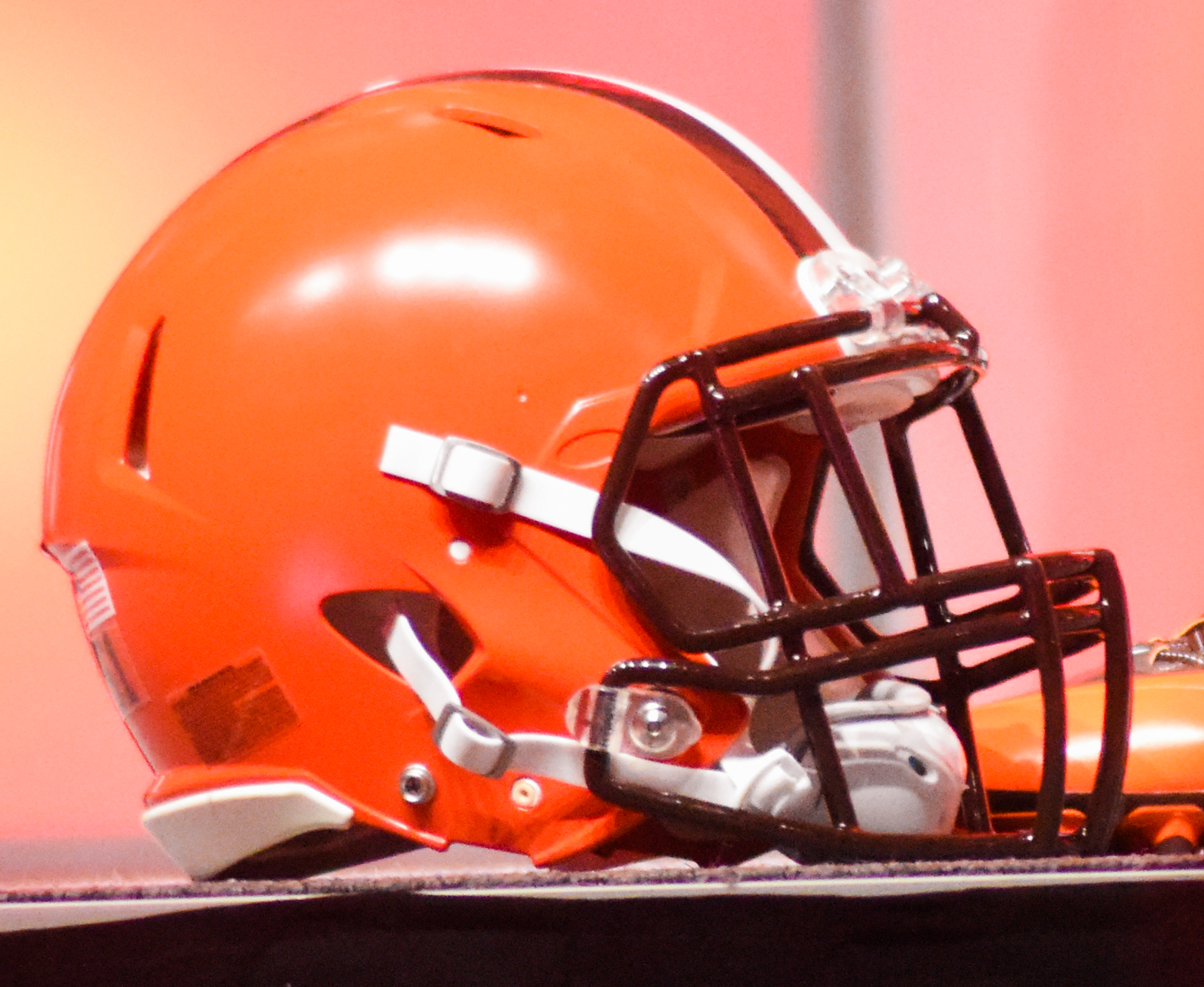
New helmet

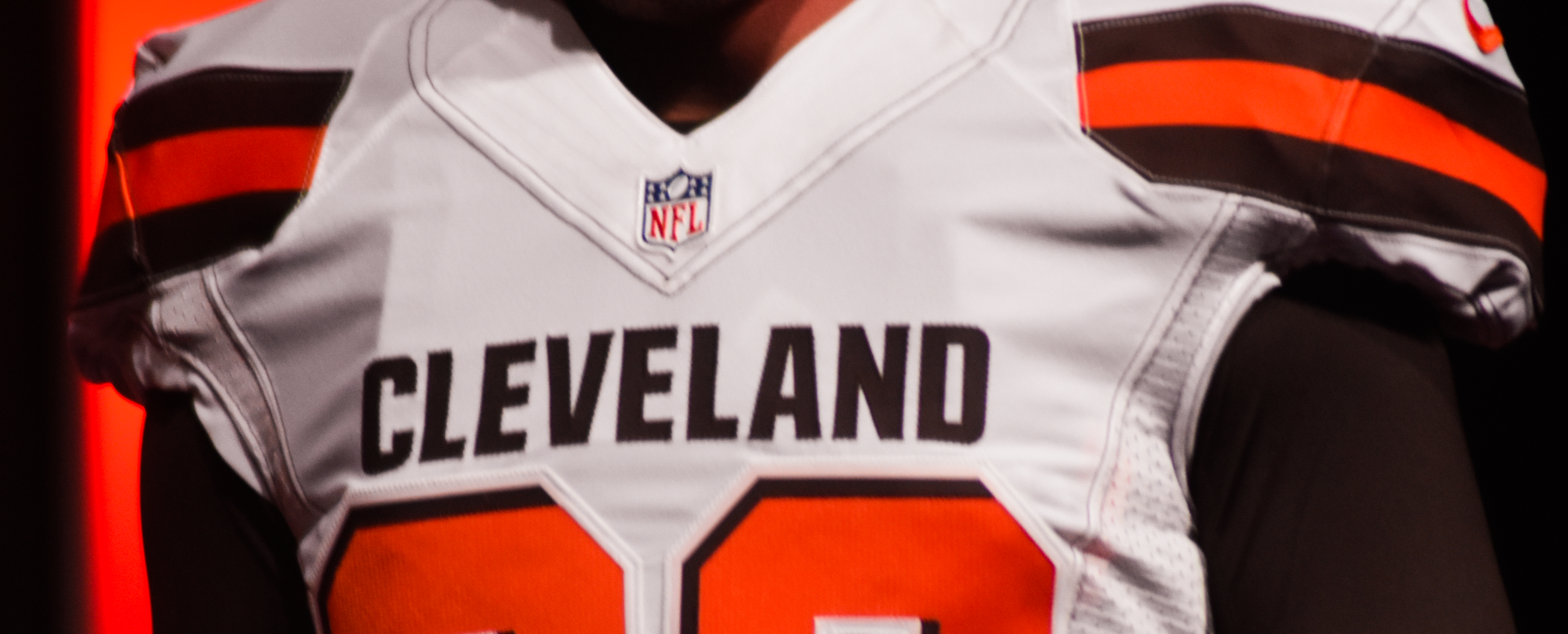
"CLEVELAND" text on the jersey

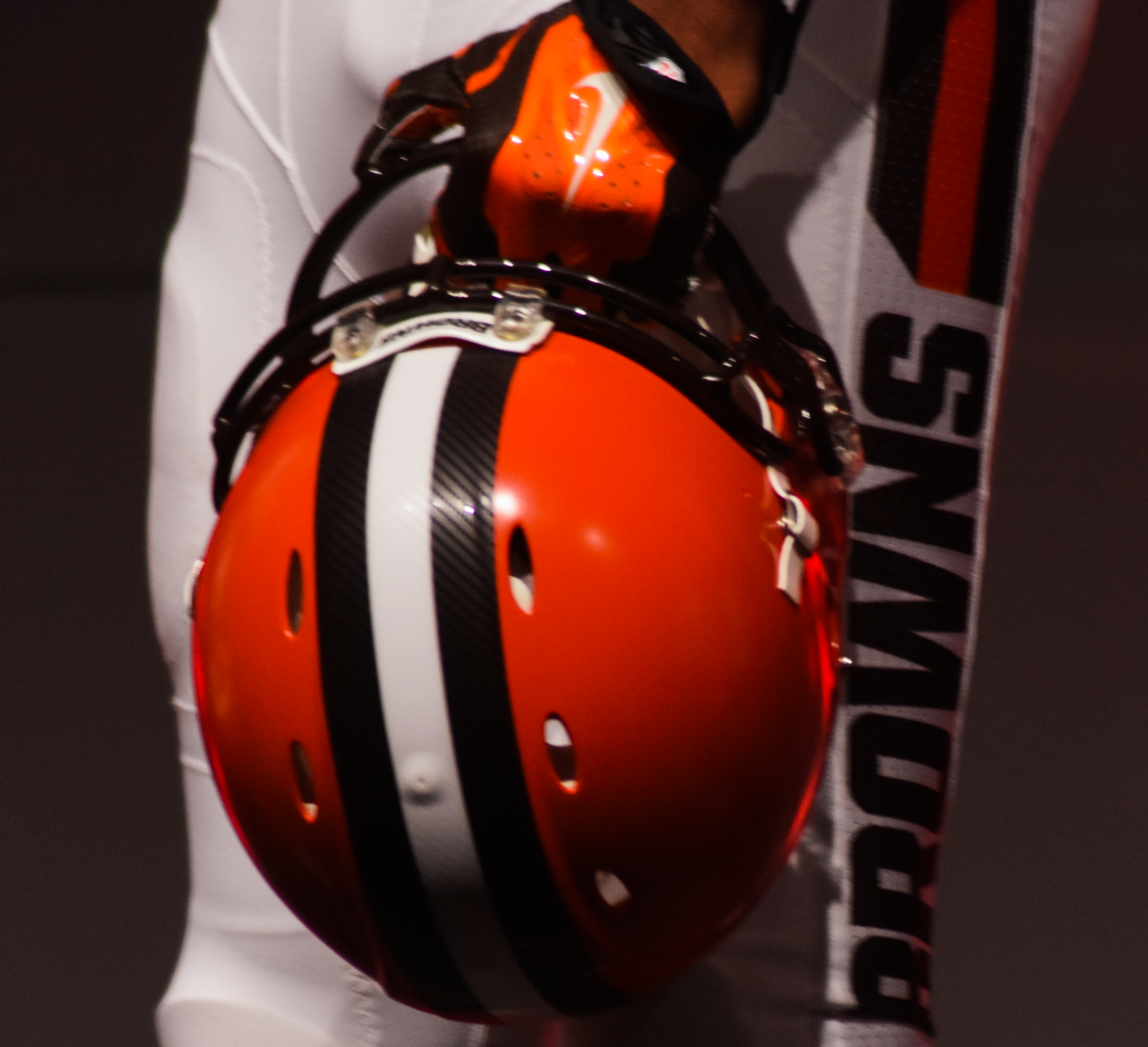
"BROWNS" text on pant leg

== Personnel ==
=== Staff / Coaches ===
2015 Cleveland Browns staff
Front office: Owner – Jimmy Haslam; President – Alec Scheiner; Executive vice-president of business operations – Bryan Wiedmeier; general manager – Ray Farmer; Executive Chief of Staff – Bill Kuharich; Vice-president of player personnel – Morocco Brown; Special Advisor – Jim Brown; Special Assistant/Head of Innovation – Steve Gera; Head coaches: Head coach – Mike Pettine; Offensive coaches: Offensive coordinator – John DeFilippo; Quarterbacks – Kevin O'Connell; Running backs – Wilbert Montgomery; Wide receivers – Joker Phillips; Assistant wide receivers – Frank Edgerly; Tight ends – Brian Angelichio; Offensive line – Andy Moeller; Assistant offensive line – George DeLeone; Senior offensive assistant – Kurt Roper; Offensive quality control – Michael McCarthy	Defensive coaches: Defensive coordinator – Jim O'Neil; Defensive line – Anthony Weaver; Linebackers – Chuck Driesbach; Outside linebackers – Brian Fleury; Secondary – Jeff Hafley; Assistant secondary/safeties – Bobby Babich; Assistant secondary/cornerbacks – Aaron Glenn; Defensive assistant – Ryan Downard; Defensive quality control – Tony Tuioti; Special teams coaches: Special teams coordinator – Chris Tabor; Special teams assistant – Shawn Mennenga; Strength and conditioning: Strength and conditioning – Paul Ricci; Assistant strength and conditioning – Derik Keyes; Assistant strength and conditioning – Mike Wolf; Strength and conditioning assistant – Jamey Mroz; Director of high performance – Adam Beard

=== Final roster ===
2015 Cleveland Browns roster
Quarterbacks (QB): 7 Austin Davis; 3 Pat Devlin; 2 Johnny Manziel; Running backs (RB): 34 Isaiah Crowell; 29 Duke Johnson; 41 Raheem Mostert; 28 Glenn Winston; Wide receivers (WR): 11 Travis Benjamin; 80 Dwayne Bowe; 18 Taylor Gabriel; 85 Rannell Hall; 10 Darius Jennings; 15 Marlon Moore; 17 Terrelle Pryor; Tight ends (TE): 82 Gary Barnidge; 88 E. J. Bibbs; 81 Jim Dray	Offensive linemen (OL): 74 Cameron Erving G; 65 Kaleb Johnson G; 55 Alex Mack C; 64 Darrian Miller T; 67 Austin Pasztor G; 72 Mitchell Schwartz T; 73 Joe Thomas T; Defensive linemen (DL): 92 Desmond Bryant DE; 96 Xavier Cooper DE; 93 John Hughes; 98 Jamie Meder DE; 71 Danny Shelton NT; 94 Randy Starks DE	Linebackers (LB): 95 Armonty Bryant OLB; 59 Tank Carder ILB; 56 Karlos Dansby ILB; 57 Cam Johnson OLB; 58 Christian Kirksey ILB; 99 Paul Kruger OLB; 51 Barkevious Mingo OLB; 44 Nate Orchard OLB; 53 Craig Robertson ILB; Defensive backs (DB): 24 Johnson Bademosi CB; 30 Ibraheim Campbell SS; 26 Pierre Desir CB; 43 Charles Gaines CB; 21 Justin Gilbert CB; 39 Tashaun Gipson FS; 35 Don Jones FS; 33 Jordan Poyer S; 31 Donte Whitner SS; 36 K'Waun Williams CB; 22 Tramon Williams CB; Special teams (ST): 6 Travis Coons K; 47 Charley Hughlett LS; 8 Andy Lee P	Practice squad: 68 Conor Boffeli G; 38 Chance Casey CB; 79 Dan France G; 62 Garth Gerhart C; 89 Connor Hamlett TE; 69 Erle Ladson T; 27 Daryl Richardson RB; 40 Sean Baker FS; 37 Tim Scott SS; 97 Dylan Wynn DE; Reserve: 75 Joel Bitonio G (IR); 61 Michael Bowie T (IR); 25 Ifo Ekpre-Olomu CB (NF-Inj.); 12 Josh Gordon WR (Susp.); 77 John Greco G (IR); 23 Joe Haden CB (IR); 83 Brian Hartline WR (IR); 16 Andrew Hawkins WR (IR); 42 Malcolm Johnson FB (IR); 13 Josh McCown QB (IR); 9 Connor Shaw QB (IR); 54 Scott Solomon OLB (IR); 86 Randall Telfer TE (NF-Inj.); Rookies in italics 53 active, 13 reserve, 10 practice squad

== Preseason ==
=== Schedule ===
This was the first preseason in 13 years in which the Great Lakes Classic was not played against the rival Detroit Lions.

Week	Date	Opponent	Result	Record	Venue	Recap
1	August 13	Washington Redskins	L 17–20	0–1	FirstEnergy Stadium	Recap
2	August 20	Buffalo Bills	L 10–11	0–2	FirstEnergy Stadium	Recap
3	August 29	at Tampa Bay Buccaneers	W 31–7	1–2	Raymond James Stadium	Recap
4	September 3	at Chicago Bears	L 0–24	1–3	Soldier Field	Recap

=== Moeller suspended ===
On September 7, the Browns suspended offensive line coach Andy Moeller indefinitely in response to an alleged assault Moeller was being investigated for. He and the Browns mutually parted ways before the team's game on September 27.

== Regular season ==
=== Schedule ===
Week	Date	Opponent	Result	Record	Venue	Recap
1	September 13	at New York Jets	**L** 10–31	0–1	MetLife Stadium	Recap
2	September 20	Tennessee Titans	**W** 28–14	1–1	FirstEnergy Stadium	Recap
3	September 27	Oakland Raiders	**L** 20–27	1–2	FirstEnergy Stadium	Recap
4	October 4	at San Diego Chargers	**L** 27–30	1–3	Qualcomm Stadium	Recap
5	October 11	at **Baltimore Ravens**	**W** 33–30 (OT)	2–3	M&T Bank Stadium	Recap
6	October 18	Denver Broncos	**L** 23–26 (OT)	2–4	FirstEnergy Stadium	Recap
7	October 25	at St. Louis Rams	**L** 6–24	2–5	Edward Jones Dome	Recap
8	November 1	Arizona Cardinals	**L** 20–34	2–6	FirstEnergy Stadium	Recap
9	November 5	at **Cincinnati Bengals**	**L** 10–31	2–7	Paul Brown Stadium	Recap
10	November 15	at **Pittsburgh Steelers**	**L** 9–30	2–8	Heinz Field	Recap
11	Bye					
12	November 30	**Baltimore Ravens**	**L** 27–33	2–9	FirstEnergy Stadium	Recap
13	December 6	**Cincinnati Bengals**	**L** 3–37	2–10	FirstEnergy Stadium	Recap
14	December 13	San Francisco 49ers	**W** 24–10	3–10	FirstEnergy Stadium	Recap
15	December 20	at Seattle Seahawks	**L** 13–30	3–11	CenturyLink Field	Recap
16	December 27	at Kansas City Chiefs	**L** 13–17	3–12	Arrowhead Stadium	Recap
17	January 3	**Pittsburgh Steelers**	**L** 12–28	3–13	FirstEnergy Stadium	Recap

Note: Intra-division opponents are in bold text.

=== Game summaries ===
==== Week 1: at New York Jets ====
Week One: Cleveland Browns at New York Jets – Game summary

Quarter	1	2	3	4	Total
Browns	0	10	0	0	**10**
**Jets**	0	14	10	7	**31**

at MetLife Stadium, East Rutherford, New Jersey

- Date: September 13
- Game time: 1:00 pm EDT
- Game weather: 77 °F (25 °C), cloudy
- Game attendance: 78,160
- Referee: Jerome Boger
- TV announcers (CBS): Greg Gumbel, Trent Green and Jamie Erdahl
- Recap, Gamebook

Game information

**First quarter**

- No scoring plays

**Second quarter**

- CLE (11:01) – Travis Benjamin 54 yd pass from Johnny Manziel (Travis Coons kick)
  **Browns 7, Jets 0** Drive: 5 plays, 58 yds, 3:14
- NYJ (9:41) – Chris Ivory 10 yd rush (Nick Folk kick)
  **Browns 7, Jets 7** Drive: 2 plays, 9 yds, 0:12
- CLE (3:29) – Travis Coons 26 yd field goal
  **Browns 10, Jets 7** Drive: 8 plays, 28 yds, 2:25
- NYJ (0:26) – Eric Decker 15 yd pass from Ryan Fitzpatrick (Nick Folk kick)
  **Jets 14, Browns 10** Drive: 9 plays, 72 yds, 3:03

**Third quarter**

- NYJ (7:51) – Brandon Marshall 1 yd pass from Ryan Fitzpatrick (Nick Folk kick)
  **Jets 21, Browns 10** Drive: 5 plays, 27 yds, 2:23
- NYJ (0:29) – Nick Folk 34 yd field goal
  **Jets 24, Browns 10** Drive: 11 plays, 60 yds, 6:01

**Fourth quarter**

- NYJ (10:43) – Chris Ivory 3 yd rush (Nick Folk kick)
  **Jets 31, Browns 10** Drive: 4 plays, 19 yds, 2:11

**Top passers**

- CLE – Johnny Manziel 13/24, 182 yds, 1 TD, 1 INT
- NYJ – Ryan Fitzpatrick 15/24, 179 yds, 2 TD, 1 INT

**Top rushers**

- CLE – Johnny Manziel 5 car, 35 yds
- NYJ – Chris Ivory 20 car, 91 yds, 2 TD

**Top receivers**

- CLE – Travis Benjamin 3 rec, 89 yds, 1 TD
- NYJ – Brandon Marshall 6 rec, 62 yds, 1 TD

Top defenders

- CLE – Donte Whitner 10 tackles
- NYJ – Calvin Pryor 10 tackles

Top special teams

- CLE – Andy Lee – 60.5 yd punt avg
- NYJ – Nick Folk – 1/1 FG, 4/4 XP

The Jets routed the Browns 31–10. Late in the first quarter, the Browns' starting quarterback, Josh McCown, fumbled the football in the Jets' endzone and suffered a concussion. He was ruled out and replaced by Johnny Manziel for the remainder of the contest. The Browns led 10–7 late in the first half, but the Jets scored a touchdown late in the second quarter to lead 14–10 at halftime. In the second half, the Browns failed to score while the Jets scored 17 unanswered points to turn it into a blowout. The Browns committed five turnovers in the game, four of them being lost fumbles. They also committed 12 penalties, losing 109 yards.

With the loss, the Browns opened the season at 0–1. They lost their 11th straight season opener, extending their NFL record for the most consecutive season opening losses by a franchise in NFL history.

==== Week 2: vs. Tennessee Titans ====
Week Two: Tennessee Titans at Cleveland Browns – Game summary

Quarter	1	2	3	4	Total
Titans	0	0	7	7	**14**
**Browns**	14	7	0	7	**28**

at FirstEnergy Stadium, Cleveland, Ohio

- Date: September 20
- Game time: 1:00 pm EDT
- Game weather: 64 °F (18 °C), sunny
- Game attendance: 67,431
- Referee: Terry McAulay
- TV announcers (CBS): Tom McCarthy and Adam Archuleta
- Preview, Gamebook

Game information

**First quarter**

- CLE (12:51) – Travis Benjamin 60 yd pass from Johnny Manziel (Travis Coons kick)
  **Browns 7, Titans 0** Drive: 2 plays, 62 yds, 0:40
- CLE (6:26) – Isaiah Crowell 11 yd run (Travis Coons kick)
  **Browns 14, Titans 0** Drive: 7 plays, 50 yds, 4:02

**Second quarter**

- CLE (0:53) – Travis Benjamin 78 yd punt return (Travis Coons kick)
  **Browns 21, Titans 0**

**Third quarter**

- TEN (1:36) – Anthony Fasano 19 yd pass from Marcus Mariota (Ryan Succop kick)
  **Browns 21, Titans 7** Drive: 8 plays, 67 yds, 4:03

**Fourth quarter**

- TEN (6:42) – Dorial Green-Beckham 13 yd pass from Marcus Mariota (R. Succop kick)
  **Browns 21, Titans 14** Drive: 15 plays, 77 yds, 8:07
- CLE (2:52) – Travis Benjamin 50 yd pass from Johnny Manziel (Travis Coons kick)
  **Browns 28, Titans 14** Drive: 7 plays, 80 yds, 3:50

**Top passers**

- TEN – Marcus Mariota 21/37, 252 yds, 2 TD
- CLE – Johnny Manziel 8/15, 172 yds, 2 TD

**Top rushers**

- TEN – Dexter McCluster 10 car, 98 yds
- CLE – Isaiah Crowell 15 car, 72 yds, 1 TD

**Top receivers**

- TEN – Anthony Fasano 5 rec, 84 yds, 1 TD
- CLE – Travis Benjamin 3 rec, 115 yds, 2 TD

Top defenders

- TEN – Zach Brown 7 tackles
- CLE – Armonty Bryant 6 tackles, 2.5 sacks

Top special teams

- TEN – Brett Kern 49.7 yd punt avg
- CLE – Travis Benjamin 154 punt return yds, 1 TD

In the team's home opener, former Heisman Trophy winners Johnny Manziel and Marcus Mariota started against each other, and the two combined for over 400 yards with each having a pair of TD's and no INT's. After the Browns led 21–0 at halftime, Anthony Fasano and Dexter McCluster factored in each of the scoring drives for Tennessee, as defensive containment limited Mariota for most of the game. The Titans cut the deficit to 21–14 late in the 4th quarter. On their next drive, the Browns reached midfield and faced 3rd and 2. On a broken play, Manziel found Benjamin and threw a touchdown to put the Browns up 28–14. The Titans reached the red zone on their next drive, but Mariota fumbled and lost the ball, allowing the Browns to run out the clock. After committing 5 turnovers in their season opener, the Browns had 0 turnovers while forcing three Titans turnovers. For Cleveland, Armonty Bryant led the Browns with 2.5 sacks (of the 7 total) as they pressured the Titans to turn over the ball three times. Travis Benjamin, who had 269 all-purpose yards, including a 78-yard punt return TD, was selected AFC Special Teams Player of the Week.

With the win, the Browns ended their six-game losing streak and improved to 1–1 on the season. Benjamin's 3 TD's were all over 50 yards, which made him only the third player in NFL history to have three 50+ yard touchdowns in the same game.

==== Week 3: vs. Oakland Raiders ====
Week Three: Oakland Raiders at Cleveland Browns – Game summary

Quarter	1	2	3	4	Total
**Raiders**	3	14	3	7	**27**
Browns	0	3	7	10	**20**

at FirstEnergy Stadium, Cleveland, Ohio

- Date: September 27
- Game time: 1:00 pm EDT
- Game weather: 75 °F (24 °C), partly cloudy
- Game attendance: 67,431
- Referee: Clete Blakeman
- TV announcers (CBS): Carter Blackburn and Chris Simms
- Recap, Gamebook

Game information

**First quarter**

- OAK (8:33) – Sebastian Janikowski 23 yd field goal
  **Raiders 3, Browns 0** Drive: 13 plays, 72 yds, 6:27

**Second quarter**

- OAK (6:46) – Andre Holmes 3 yd pass from Derek Carr (Sebastian Janikowski kick)
  **Raiders 10, Browns 0** Drive: 11 plays, 80 yds, 5:27
- CLE (1:44) – Travis Coons 24 yd field goal
  **Raiders 10, Browns 3** Drive: 13 plays, 74 yds, 5:02
- OAK (0:18) – Seth Roberts 13 yd pass from Derek Carr (Sebastian Janikowski kick)
  **Raiders 17, Browns 3** Drive: 5 plays, 70 yds, 1:26

**Third quarter**

- OAK (9:25) – Sebastian Janikowski 35 yd field goal
  **Raiders 20, Browns 3** Drive: 9 plays, 76 yds, 3:59
- CLE (3:32) – Gary Barnidge 28 yd pass from Josh McCown (Travis Coons kick)
  **Raiders 20, Browns 10** Drive: 13 plays, 80 yds, 5:53

**Fourth quarter**

- OAK (14:30) – Latavius Murray 6 yd run (Sebastian Janikowski kick)
  **Raiders 27, Browns 10** Drive: 7 plays, 80 yds, 4:02
- CLE (11:01) – Travis Coons 41 yd field goal
  **Raiders 27, Browns 13** Drive: 9 plays, 57 yds, 3:33
- CLE (6:28) – Travis Benjamin 4 yd pass from Josh McCown (Travis Coons kick)
  **Raiders 27, Browns 20** Drive: 6 plays, 44 yds, 1:58

**Top passers**

- OAK – Derek Carr 20/32, 314 yds, 2 TD
- CLE – Josh McCown 28/49, 341 yds, 2 TD, 1 INT

**Top rushers**

- OAK – Latavius Murray 26 car, 139 yds, 1 TD
- CLE – Isaiah Crowell 10 car, 36 yds

**Top receivers**

- OAK – Amari Cooper 8 rec, 134 yds
- CLE – Gary Barnidge 6 rec, 105 yds, 1 TD

Top defenders

- OAK – Malcolm Smith 7 tackles, 1 sack
- CLE – Karlos Dansby 9 tackles

Top special teams

- OAK – Sebastian Janikowski 2/2 FG, 3/3 XP
- CLE – Travis Coons 2/2 FG, 2/2 XP

The Raiders opened the scoring on their first drive of the game, settling for a field goal to take a 3–0 lead. The Browns failed to score and trailed 3–0 after the first quarter. The Raiders scored a second quarter touchdown to take a 10–0 lead. Late in the half, the Browns reached the Raiders' 1 yard line and had 1st and goal at the 1. However, they failed to get into the end zone in three attempts. After a false start penalty on 4th and goal, the Browns settled for a field goal to cut the deficit to 10–3. With less than two minutes remaining in the half, the Raiders drove down the field, and QB Derek Carr threw a touchdown pass, giving the Raiders a 17–3 lead at halftime. Early in the third quarter, the Raiders kicked another field goal and went up 20–3. The Browns finally reached the end zone in the third quarter as QB Josh McCown completed a 28-yard pass to TE Gary Barnidge, cutting it to 20–10. The Raiders scored another touchdown early in the 4th quarter, and the Browns trailed 27–10. At that moment, the Browns began to mount a 4th quarter rally. K Travis Coons kicked a field goal to pull within 27–13. The Raiders turned the ball over in their own territory on their next drive, and the Browns scored another touchdown to cut the deficit to 27–20. The Browns' defense forced a 3 and out, and the Raiders were forced to punt. However, Travis Benjamin muffed the punt, and the Raiders recovered it. The Raiders ran three more plays before they punted again, pinning the Browns at their own 2. The Browns had one last chance to score a game saving touchdown. Within 2 minutes, they reached the Raiders' 29. After McCown was sacked, the Browns faced 3rd and 14 on the Raiders' 34 with under 45 seconds to play. At that moment, McCown threw a pass that was intercepted by Charles Woodson. With no timeouts remaining, the Raiders were able to kneel and run out the clock.

With the loss, the Browns dropped to 1–2.

==== Week 4: at San Diego Chargers ====
Week Four: Cleveland Browns at San Diego Chargers – Game summary

Quarter	1	2	3	4	Total
Browns	3	10	3	11	**27**
**Chargers**	7	6	7	10	**30**

at Qualcomm Stadium, San Diego, California

- Date: October 4
- Game time: 4:05 pm EDT/1:05 pm PDT
- Game weather: 68 °F (20 °C), cloudy
- Game attendance: 63,710
- Referee: Bill Vinovich
- TV announcers (CBS): Andrew Catalon, Steve Beuerlein, Steve Tasker and Scott Kaplan
- Recap, Gamebook

Game information

**First quarter**

- CLE (4:12) – Travis Coons 36 yd field goal
  **Browns 3, Chargers 0** Drive: 11 plays, 64 yds, 6:20
- SD (0:48) – Keenan Allen 28 yd pass from Philip Rivers (Josh Lambo kick)
  **Chargers 7, Browns 3** Drive: 8 plays, 80 yds, 3:24

**Second quarter**

- CLE (14:10) – Duke Johnson 34 yd pass from Josh McCown (Travis Coons kick)
  **Browns 10, Chargers 7** Drive: 4 plays, 80 yds, 1:38
- SD (10:37) – Josh Lambo 46 yd field goal
  **Browns 10, Chargers 10** Drive: 9 plays, 56 yds, 3:33
- SD (1:36) – Josh Lambo 45 yd field goal
  **Chargers 13, Browns 10** Drive: 10 plays, 60 yds, 1:59
- CLE (0:03) – Travis Coons 28 yd field goal
  **Chargers 13, Browns 13** Drive: 9 plays, 70 yds, 1:30

**Third quarter**

- CLE (5:54) – Travis Coons 33 yd field goal
  **Browns 16, Chargers 13** Drive: 9 plays, 68 yds, 5:21
- SD (4:23) – Ladarius Green 19 yd pass from Philip Rivers (Josh Lambo kick)
  **Chargers 20, Browns 16** Drive: 3 plays, 81 yds, 1:31

**Fourth quarter**

- CLE (9:57) – Travis Coons 40 yd field goal
  **Chargers 20, Browns 19** Drive: 9 plays, 40 yds, 5:03
- SD (7:26) – John Phillips 1 yd pass from Philip Rivers (Josh Lambo kick)
  **Chargers 27, Browns 19** Drive: 5 plays, 74 yds, 2:31
- CLE (2:09) – Gary Barnidge 1 yd pass from Josh McCown (McCown pass to Gabriel)
  **Chargers 27, Browns 27** Drive: 10 plays, 67 yds, 5:17

**Top passers**

- CLE – Josh McCown 32/41, 356 yds, 2 TD
- SD – Philip Rivers 23/38, 358 yds, 3 TD

**Top rushers**

- CLE – Isaiah Crowell 12 car, 63 yds
- SD – Danny Woodhead 8 car, 54 yds

**Top receivers**

- CLE – Duke Johnson 9 rec, 85 yds, 1 TD
- SD – Dontrelle Inman 3 rec, 88 yds

Top defenders

- CLE – Donte Whitner 7 tackles
- SD – Manti Te'o 13 tackles

Top special teams

- CLE –
- SD –

The Browns were making their first trip to San Diego since 2006. The game was back and forth, with neither team leading by more than one possession. The Chargers led 7–3 after the first quarter. On the Browns' first drive of the second quarter, QB Josh McCown threw a 34-yard touchdown pass to RB Duke Johnson to put the Browns up 10–7. The teams traded field goals, making it a 13–13 game at halftime. The Browns scored a field goal at the start of the third quarter to go up 16–13. On the Chargers' next drive, QB Philip Rivers led the Chargers to a touchdown, going up 20–16 heading into the fourth quarter. After K Travis Coons kicked a field goal to cut the deficit to 20–19, Rivers led another touchdown drive to put the Chargers up 27–19. On the Browns' next drive, they reached the end zone, assisted by a catch by TE Gary Barnidge on the Chargers' 1 yard line. They converted on the two-point conversion to tie the game at 27–27 with just over 2 minutes remaining. The Chargers reached the Browns' 24 yard line with under 50 seconds to play. The Browns began to use timeouts until the Chargers faced 4th down with 2 seconds to play. After the Chargers called timeout, their kicker had an opportunity to win the game with a 39-yard field goal. The 39-yard game-winning attempt was off to the right, and the game appeared to be on its way to overtime. However, CB Tramon Williams was flagged for being offside during the play, giving the Chargers another attempt, this time from 34 yards. The field goal was converted, and the Chargers won 30–27. The Browns committed 12 penalties in the game, including this critical offside penalty.

With the loss, the Browns fell to 1–3.

==== Week 5: at Baltimore Ravens ====
Week Five: Cleveland Browns at Baltimore Ravens – Game summary

Quarter	1	2	3	4	OT	Total
**Browns**	3	6	7	14	3	**33**
Ravens	14	0	7	9	0	**30**

at M&T Bank Stadium, Baltimore, Maryland

- Date: October 11
- Game time: 1:00 pm EDT
- Game weather: 65 °F (18 °C), mostly sunny
- Game attendance: 71,046
- Referee: Jeff Triplette
- TV announcers (CBS): Kevin Harlan, Rich Gannon and Dana Jacobson
- Recap, Gamebook

Game information

**First quarter**

- BAL – Joe Flacco 1-yard run (Justin Tucker kick), 8:35. Ravens 7–0. **Drive: 8 plays, 61 yards, 3:14.**
- CLE – Travis Coons 43-yard field goal, 3:16. Ravens 7–3. **Drive: 10 plays, 55 yards, 5:19.**
- BAL – Kyle Juszczyk 8-yard pass from Joe Flacco (Justin Tucker kick), 0:23. Ravens 14–3. **Drive: 6 plays, 73 yards, 2:55.**

**Second quarter**

- CLE – Travis Coons 43-yard field goal, 4:09. Ravens 14–6. **Drive: 6 plays, 36 yards, 2:42.**
- CLE – Travis Coons 37-yard field goal, 0:02. Ravens 14–9. **Drive: 7 plays, 40 yards, 1:03.**

**Third quarter**

- BAL – Joe Flacco 1-yard run (Justin Tucker kick), 7:50. Ravens 21–9. **Drive: 9 plays, 90 yards, 4:26.**
- CLE – Josh McCown 10-yard run (Travis Coons kick), 1:14. Ravens 21–16. **Drive: 13 plays, 75 yards, 6:41.**

**Fourth quarter**

- CLE – Gary Barnidge 18-yard pass from Josh McCown (pass failed), 12:29. Browns 22–21. **Drive: 4 plays, 79 yards, 1:42.**
- BAL – Justin Forsett 1-yard run (pass failed), 6:00. Ravens 27–22. **Drive: 7 plays, 43 yards, 2:50.**
- CLE – Isaiah Crowell 22-yard pass from Josh McCown to Andrew Hawkins, 3:15. Browns 30–27. **Drive: 6 plays, 80 yards, 2:53.**
- BAL – Justin Tucker 23-yard field goal, 0:29. Tied 30–30. **Drive: 11 plays, 75 yards, 2:38.**

**Overtime**

- CLE – Travis Coons 32-yard field goal, 6:48. Browns 33–30. **Drive: 12 plays, 51 yards, 7:11.**

**Top passers**

- CLE – Josh McCown – 36/51, 457 yards, 2 TD
- BAL – Joe Flacco – 19/35, 210 yards, TD

**Top rushers**

- CLE – Isaiah Crowell – 13 rushes, 49 yards
- BAL – Justin Forsett – 21 rushes, 121 yards, TD

**Top receivers**

- CLE – Gary Barnidge – 8 receptions, 139 yards, TD
- BAL – Kamar Aiken – 4 receptions, 78 yards

**Top tacklers**

- CLE – Karlos Dansby – 3 tackles, 7 assists
- BAL – Daryl Smith – 7 tackles, 5 assists

The Browns opened division play in a week five battle with the Baltimore Ravens. Ravens QB Joe Flacco entered this game with a 13–1 record against the Browns. The Ravens' defense was strong, limiting the running game to just nine yards on the first eight attempts, with constant blitz pressure forcing Browns QB Josh McCown to make the right reads on his passes. The Ravens led 14–3 after the first quarter and 21–9 early in the third quarter. At that point, the Browns began to come back. The Browns scored a touchdown to make it 21–16 heading into the 4th quarter. Connecting with TE Gary Barnidge on an 80-yard drive in the fourth quarter, the Browns led for the first time at 22–21. Teams then traded scores, with the Ravens leading 27–22, then the Browns leading 30–27 with three minutes left in regulation. The Ravens used those three minutes to drive down the field and tie the game with a field goal. Tied at 30 after regulation, the game headed into overtime. The Ravens got the ball first. The Browns' defense forced a 3-and-out, and Travis Benjamin set up the punt at the Browns' 35. The Ravens failed to force a punt or turnover as the Browns drove down the field to the Ravens' 14 yard line, where K Travis Coons would kick the game-winning field goal.

McCown completed passes to nine different receivers; four of them – Gary Barnidge, Travis Benjamin, Andrew Hawkins and Taylor Gabriel – had six or more receptions. He finished 36/51 for a career-high 457 yards with two passing touchdowns and a rushing touchdown. McCown also became the first quarterback in franchise history to throw 300+ passing yards in three straight games. The Browns ran the ball 25 times, with seven carries in overtime to set up the game-winning field goal by Coons, who became 10-for-10 to start his career.

With the win, the Browns improved to 2–3. The Browns snapped a five-game losing streak in away games and a seven-game losing streak in Baltimore. This was also the Browns' first overtime win since November 18, 2007, coincidentally a 33–30 victory over the Ravens in Baltimore, in the infamous "Dawson Bar" Game.

For his performance, QB Josh McCown was named AFC Offensive Player of the Week.

This game would be the last away win for the Cleveland Browns until Week 12 of the 2018 season when they defeated the Bengals in Cincinnati (the Browns would lose 25 straight away games, one short of the NFL record). It would also be the last time the Browns would defeat an AFC North rival until Week 5 of the 2018 season, when they would defeat the Ravens.

==== Week 6: vs. Denver Broncos ====
Week Six: Denver Broncos at Cleveland Browns – Game summary

Quarter	1	2	3	4	OT	Total
**Broncos**	3	7	3	10	3	**26**
Browns	0	0	7	16	0	**23**

at FirstEnergy Stadium, Cleveland, Ohio

- Date: October 18
- Game time: 1:00 pm EDT
- Game weather: 47 °F (8 °C), sunny
- Game attendance: 67,431
- Referee: Craig Wrolstad
- TV announcers (CBS): Ian Eagle, Dan Fouts and Evan Washburn
- Recap, Gamebook

Game information

**First quarter**

- DEN – Brandon McManus 29-yard field goal, 2:53. Broncos 3–0. **Drive: 15 plays, 58 yards, 7:18.**

**Second quarter**

- DEN – Aqib Talib 63-yard interception return (Brandon McManus kick), 14:19. Broncos 10–0.

**Third quarter**

- CLE – Gary Barnidge 11-yard pass from Josh McCown (Travis Coons kick), 11:12. Broncos 10–7. **Drive: 8 plays, 74 yards, 3:53.**
- DEN – Brandon McManus 25-yard field goal, 2:08. Broncos 13–7. **Drive: 6 plays, 34 yards, 2:43.**

**Fourth quarter**

- DEN – Brandon McManus 39-yard field goal, 13:36. Broncos 16–7. **Drive: 8 plays, 51 yards, 3:07.**
- CLE – Gary Barnidge 14-yard pass from Josh McCown (Travis Coons kick), 9:20. Broncos 16–14. **Drive: 8 plays, 80 yards, 4:17.**
- CLE – Karlos Dansby 35-yard interception return (pass failed), 8:18. Browns 20–16.
- DEN – Emmanuel Sanders 75-yard pass from Peyton Manning (Brandon McManus kick), 8:02. Broncos 23–20. **Drive: 1 play, 75 yards, 0:14.**
- CLE – Travis Coons 26-yard field goal, 1:32. Tied 23–23. **Drive: 10 plays, 52 yards, 3:21.**

**Overtime**

- DEN – Brandon McManus 34-yard field goal, 4:57. Broncos 26–23. **Drive: 13 plays, 72 yards, 6:42.**

**Top passers**

- DEN – Peyton Manning – 26/48, 290 yards, TD, 3 INT
- CLE – Josh McCown – 20/39, 213 yards, 2 TD, 2 INT

**Top rushers**

- DEN – Ronnie Hillman – 20 rushes, 111 yards
- CLE – Duke Johnson – 9 rushes, 38 yards

**Top receivers**

- DEN – Demaryius Thomas – 10 receptions, 111 yards
- CLE – Travis Benjamin – 9 receptions, 117 yards

**Top tacklers**

- DEN – Danny Trevathan – 7 tackles, 3 assists
- CLE – Pierre Desir – 10 tackles, 2 assists

The Browns entered this game hoping to knock off the unbeaten Denver Broncos. The Broncos' defense dominated the first half as the Browns trailed 10–0 at halftime. The Browns had 94 yards of offense, their lowest total yards in a half this season. The Broncos' offense scored a field goal while CB Aqib Talib picked off QB Josh McCown and scored a defensive touchdown. On the Browns' first drive of the second half, they went 72 yards and McCown threw a touchdown pass to TE Gary Barnidge to cut the deficit to 10–7. The Broncos kicked a field goal late in the third quarter and took a 13–7 lead into the fourth quarter. Early in the fourth quarter, the Broncos extended the lead to 16–7. The Browns went down the field as McCown and Barnidge connected on another touchdown, cutting the deficit to 16–14. On the Broncos' next drive, Denver QB Peyton Manning threw an interception to LB Karlos Dansby, which was returned for a touchdown. The Browns took their first lead of the game, going up 20–16. The Browns attempted a two-point conversion which would have given them a six-point lead, but failed. On the first play of the Broncos' next drive, Manning threw a 72-yard touchdown pass to Sanders, and the Broncos reclaimed the lead at 23–20. The teams traded punts before the Browns tied the game with a field goal, making it 23–23. On the Broncos' next drive, the Browns forced a three and out. The Browns reached the Broncos' 46 and were approaching field goal range. However, McCown threw an interception on 2nd and 10. The Broncos went three and out again and were forced to punt. The Browns took a knee, and the game went into overtime.

In overtime, The Broncos won the coin toss and elected to receive. On 3rd and 2, Manning threw an interception to LB Barkevious Mingo, who ran it back to the Broncos' 39. The Browns were approaching field goal range and would win the game with a field goal. However, they lost 13 yards on the next three plays and were forced to punt. The Broncos reached the Browns' 16 on their next drive, and their kicker Brandon McManus successfully converted the 34-yard game-winning field goal.

With the loss, the Browns fell to 2–4.

==== Week 7: at St. Louis Rams ====
Week Seven: Cleveland Browns at St. Louis Rams – Game summary

Quarter	1	2	3	4	Total
Browns	0	3	3	0	**6**
**Rams**	10	0	7	7	**24**

at Edward Jones Dome, St. Louis, Missouri

- Date: October 25
- Game time: 1:00 pm EDT/12:00 pm CDT
- Game weather: Played indoors (dome stadium)
- Game attendance: 51,523
- Referee: Pete Morelli
- TV announcers (CBS): Brian Anderson and Chris Simms
- Recap, Gamebook

Game information

**First quarter**

- STL – Rodney McLeod 20-yard fumble return (Greg Zuerlein kick), 12:06. Rams 7–0.
- STL – Greg Zuerlein 39-yard field goal, 7:40. Rams 10–0. **Drive: 4 plays, 4 yards, 1:42.**

**Second quarter**

- CLE – Travis Coons 25-yard field goal, 14:07. Rams 10–3. **Drive: 14 plays, 73 yards, 8:28.**

**Third quarter**

- CLE – Travis Coons 44-yard field goal, 11:53. Rams 10–6. **Drive: 6 plays, 54 yards, 3:15.**
- STL – Todd Gurley 1-yard run (Greg Zuerlein kick), 2:20. Rams 17–6. **Drive: 4 plays, 88 yards, 1:55.**

**Fourth quarter**

- STL – Todd Gurley 16-yard run (Greg Zuerlein kick), 8:18. Rams 24–6. **Drive: 7 plays, 56 yards, 4:06.**

**Top passers**

- CLE – Josh McCown – 26/32, 270 yards
- STL – Nick Foles – 15/23, 163 yards

**Top rushers**

- CLE – Robert Turbin – 5 rushes, 30 yards
- STL – Todd Gurley – 19 rushes, 128 yards, 2 TD

**Top receivers**

- CLE – Gary Barnidge – 6 receptions, 101 yards
- STL – Tavon Austin – 4 receptions, 43 yards

**Top tacklers**

- CLE – Jordan Poyer – 5 tackles, 5 assists
- STL – Mark Barron – 10 tackles, 6 assists

The Rams routed the Browns 24–6. The Browns committed turnovers by fumbling on their first two drives, one of which was run back for a defensive touchdown while the other resulted in a Rams field goal to put the Browns behind 10–0. The Browns kicked two field goals and cut the deficit to 10–6, but the offense stalled afterwards. The Rams forced two more turnovers via fumbles, and Rams RB Todd Gurley scored two more touchdowns to go up 24–6 early in the 4th quarter and put the game away.

With the loss, the Browns fell to 2–5.

==== Week 8: vs. Arizona Cardinals ====
Week Eight: Arizona Cardinals at Cleveland Browns – Game summary

Quarter	1	2	3	4	Total
**Cardinals**	7	3	14	10	**34**
Browns	7	13	0	0	**20**

at FirstEnergy Stadium, Cleveland, Ohio

- Date: November 1
- Game time: 1:00 pm EST
- Game weather: 62 °F (17 °C), sunny
- Game attendance: 67,431
- Referee: Walt Coleman
- TV announcers (Fox): Matt Smith, Chris Cooley and Danielle Trotta
- Recap, Gamebook

Game information

**First quarter**

- ARI – Troy Niklas 11-yard pass from Carson Palmer (Chandler Catanzaro kick), 8:07. Cardinals 7–0. **Drive: 11 plays, 82 yards, 7:01.**
- CLE – Brian Hartline 10-yard pass from Josh McCown (Travis Coons kick), 2:45. Tied 7–7. **Drive: 3 plays, 9 yards, 0:55.**

**Second quarter**

- CLE – Gary Barnidge 3-yard pass from Josh McCown (Travis Coons kick), 14:53. Browns 14–7. **Drive: 6 plays, 66 yards, 2:05.**
- CLE – Brian Hartline 2-yard pass from Josh McCown (kick failed), 5:01. Browns 20–7. **Drive: 14 plays, 72 yards, 7:32.**
- ARI – Chandler Catanzaro 37-yard field goal, 0:02. Browns 20–10. **Drive: 4 plays, 31 yards, 0:24.**

**Third quarter**

- ARI – Michael Floyd 60-yard pass from Carson Palmer (Chandler Catanzaro kick), 11:56. Browns 20–17. **Drive: 4 plays, 71 yards, 2:04.**
- ARI – Troy Niklas 1-yard pass from Carson Palmer (Chandler Catanzaro kick), 7:39. Cardinals 24–20. **Drive: 4 plays, 48 yards, 1:50.**

**Fourth quarter**

- ARI – Larry Fitzgerald 6-yard pass from Carson Palmer (Chandler Catanzaro kick), 9:35. Cardinals 31–20. **Drive: 12 plays, 80 yards, 5:20.**
- ARI – Chandler Catanzaro 35-yard field goal, 2:20. Cardinals 34–20. **Drive: 12 plays, 43 yards, 5:17.**

**Top passers**

- ARI – Carson Palmer – 23/38, 374 yards, 4 TD, INT
- CLE – Josh McCown – 18/34, 211 yards, 3 TD, INT

**Top rushers**

- ARI – Chris Johnson – 30 rushes, 109 yards
- CLE – Josh McCown – 5 rushes, 18 yards

**Top receivers**

- ARI – Michael Floyd – 4 receptions, 106 yards, TD
- CLE – Gary Barnidge – 7 receptions, 53 yards, TD

**Top tacklers**

- ARI – Kevin Minter – 5 tackles, 2 assists
- CLE – Tramon Williams – 6 tackles, 3 assists

The Cardinals received the ball first and scored on an 82-yard touchdown drive to go up 7–0. After a turnover, the Browns tied the game up at 7–7. The Browns later scored two more touchdowns to go up 20–7. The Cardinals drove into the red zone, but Cardinals WR Larry Fitzgerald turned the ball over with a fumble. After the Browns went 3 and out, the Cardinals drove down the field and kicked a field goal to cut the deficit to 20–10 heading into halftime.

The Cardinals dominated the second half. They scored 14 unanswered points to go up 24–20 heading into the 4th quarter. The Cardinals committed a turnover on their own 20 late in the third quarter, but McCown threw an interception into the endzone on the Browns' next drive. The Cardinals scored another touchdown on their next drive, going up 31–20. After the Browns turned it over, the Cardinals kicked a field goal to make it 34–20. With QB Josh McCown injured, backup Johnny Manziel entered the game on the Browns' final drive. However, the Browns were able to gain only one first down before turning it over on downs and effectively ending the game.

With the loss, the Browns fell to 2–6 and 0-2 against the NFC West.

==== Week 9: at Cincinnati Bengals ====
Week Nine: Cleveland Browns at Cincinnati Bengals – Game summary

Quarter	1	2	3	4	Total
Browns	3	7	0	0	**10**
**Bengals**	7	7	3	14	**31**

at Paul Brown Stadium, Cincinnati, Ohio

- Date: November 5
- Game time: 8:25 pm EST
- Game weather: 71 °F (22 °C), cloudy
- Game attendance: 65,816
- Referee: John Hussey
- TV announcers (NFLN): Jim Nantz, Phil Simms and Tracy Wolfson
- Recap, Gamebook

Game information

**First quarter**

- CIN – Tyler Eifert 9-yard pass from Andy Dalton (Mike Nugent kick), 7:12. Bengals 7–0. **Drive: 10 plays, 63 yards, 5:13.**
- CLE – Travis Coons 27-yard field goal, 0:10. Bengals 7–3. **Drive: 14 plays, 71 yards, 7:02.**

**Second quarter**

- CIN – Tyler Eifert 2-yard pass from Andy Dalton (Mike Nugent kick), 4:42. Bengals 14–3. **Drive: 14 plays, 80 yards, 6:42.**
- CLE – Duke Johnson 12-yard pass from Johnny Manziel (Travis Coons kick), 0:27. Bengals 14–10. **Drive: 10 plays, 92 yards, 4:15.**

**Third quarter**

- CIN – Mike Nugent 28-yard field goal, 4:09. Bengals 17–10. **Drive: 9 plays, 39 yards, 4:57.**

**Fourth quarter**

- CIN – Mohamed Sanu 25-yard run (Mike Nugent kick), 13:35. Bengals 24–10. **Drive: 8 plays, 91 yards, 4:31.**
- CIN – Tyler Eifert 19-yard pass from Andy Dalton (Mike Nugent kick), 7:48. Bengals 31–10. **Drive: 8 plays, 58 yards, 3:55.**

**Top passers**

- CLE – Johnny Manziel – 15/33, 168 yards, TD
- CIN – Andy Dalton – 21/27, 234 yards, 3 TD

**Top rushers**

- CLE – Isaiah Crowell – 10 rushes, 38 yards
- CIN – Giovani Bernard – 13 rushes, 72 yards

**Top receivers**

- CLE – Duke Johnson – 2 receptions, 38 yards, TD
- CIN – Marvin Jones – 5 receptions, 78 yards

**Top tacklers**

- CLE – Karlos Dansby – 8 tackles, 3 assists
- CIN – Carlos Dunlap – 4 tackles (2 sacks)

In a Thursday Night Football matchup, the Bengals defeated the Browns 31–10. Browns QB Johnny Manziel made his fourth career start and second of this season in place of the injured Josh McCown. The Browns received the ball first and punted after gaining only one first down. The Bengals would score a touchdown on their opening drive to take a 7–0 lead. The Browns reached the Bengals' 4, but they were unable to reach the end zone and had to settle for a field goal. Leading 7–3 after the first quarter, the Bengals scored an early second quarter touchdown to go up 14–3. The Browns marched down 93 yards and scored a touchdown to cut the deficit to 14–10 heading into halftime.

However, the Bengals dominated the second half as the Browns would not record a single first down until the three-minute mark of the 4th quarter and had only 2 first downs for the entire second half. The Bengals would score another touchdown to go up 24–10 early in the 4th quarter. After a 3-and-out from the Browns, the Bengals scored another touchdown on their next drive to take a 31–10 lead. The Browns attempted to respond, but they could not gain a first down and punted again. Late in the game, the Browns blocked a Bengals punt and had the ball at Cincinnati's 37. They had two first downs on the drive, but they failed to score a touchdown and eventually turned the ball over on downs with 44 seconds left in the game, allowing the Bengals to run out the clock.

With the loss, the Browns' record dropped to 2–7.

==== Week 10: at Pittsburgh Steelers ====
Week Ten: Cleveland Browns at Pittsburgh Steelers – Game summary

Quarter	1	2	3	4	Total
Browns	3	0	0	6	**9**
**Steelers**	6	15	3	6	**30**

at Heinz Field, Pittsburgh, Pennsylvania

- Date: November 15
- Game time: 1:00 pm EST
- Game weather: 61 °F (16 °C), sunny
- Game attendance: 64,402
- Referee: Ron Torbert
- TV announcers (CBS): Ian Eagle, Dan Fouts and Evan Washburn
- Recap, Gamebook

Game information

**First quarter**

- PIT – Chris Boswell 24-yard field goal, 11:02. Steelers 3–0. **Drive: 4 plays, 6 yards, 1:27.**
- CLE – Travis Coons 23-yard field goal, 8:09. Tied 3–3. **Drive: 7 plays, 67 yards, 2:53.**
- PIT – Chris Boswell 34-yard field goal, 4:49. Steelers 6–3. **Drive: 9 plays, 64 yards, 3:21.**

**Second quarter**

- PIT – Antonio Brown 4-yard pass from Ben Roethlisberger (Ben Roethlisberger – Antonio Brown pass), 3:32. Steelers 14–3. **Drive: 8 plays, 92 yards, 3:49.**
- PIT – Martavis Bryant 32-yard pass from Ben Roethlisberger (Chris Boswell kick), 0:42. Steelers 21–3. **Drive: 2 plays, 47 yards, 0:28.**

**Third quarter**

- PIT – Chris Boswell 25-yard field goal, 8:36. Steelers 24–3. **Drive: 6 plays, 80 yards, 1:38.**

**Fourth quarter**

- CLE – Gary Barnidge 7-yard pass from Johnny Manziel (kick failed), 12:33. Steelers 24–9. **Drive: 2 plays, 11 yards, 0:46.**
- PIT – Antonio Brown 56-yard pass from Ben Roethlisberger (kick failed), 9:17. Steelers 30–9. **Drive: 7 plays, 80 yards, 3:21.**

**Top passers**

- CLE – Johnny Manziel – 33/45, 372 yards, TD, INT
- PIT – Ben Roethlisberger – 22/33, 379 yards, 3 TD, INT

**Top rushers**

- CLE – Johnny Manziel – 3 rushes, 17 yards
- PIT – DeAngelo Williams – 17 rushes, 54 yards

**Top receivers**

- CLE – Travis Benjamin – 7 receptions, 113 yards
- PIT – Martavis Bryant – 6 receptions, 178 yards, TD

**Top tacklers**

- CLE – Karlos Dansby – 3 tackles, 3 assists
- PIT – Will Allen – 9 tackles, 2 assists, 1 forced fumble

The Browns entered into their divisional rivalry game with the Pittsburgh Steelers, having lost 19 of their last 22 meetings and 11 straight games at Heinz Field. Neither team's designated starting quarterback would start the game as Josh McCown had a rib injury and Steelers' QB Ben Roethlisberger had a foot injury. Pittsburgh QB Landry Jones would leave the game in the first quarter with an injury, forcing Roethlisberger into the game. Leading 6–3 after the 1st quarter, the Steelers would take control of the game in the 2nd quarter, scoring two touchdowns and taking a 21–3 lead into halftime. Steelers kicker Chris Boswell added a field goal in the third quarter. Early in the fourth quarter, the Browns retaliated with a Johnny Manziel touchdown pass to Gary Barnidge to cut Pittsburgh's lead to 24–9, but a late Steelers touchdown gave them a 30–9 lead, which would end up being the final score.

Coming off the bench, Roethlisberger passed for 379 yards and three touchdowns, two of which went to WR Antonio Brown who recorded 139 yards, and one to WR Martavis Bryant who led the Steelers with 178 receiving yards. In the loss, Manziel passed for a career-high 372 yards and a touchdown, but he threw a key interception in the red zone with the second play of the 4th quarter. Also, the Steelers defense sacked Manziel six times.

With the loss, the Browns entered their bye week at 2–8 and had sole possession of the NFL's worst record.

==== Week 12: vs. Baltimore Ravens ====
Week Twelve: Baltimore Ravens at Cleveland Browns – Game summary

Quarter	1	2	3	4	Total
**Ravens**	10	7	7	9	**33**
Browns	0	13	7	7	**27**

at FirstEnergy Stadium, Cleveland, Ohio

- Date: November 30
- Game time: 8:30 pm EST
- Game weather: 45 °F (7 °C), clear
- Game attendance: 64,380
- Referee: Brad Allen
- TV announcers (ESPN): Mike Tirico, Jon Gruden and Lisa Salters
- Recap, Gamebook

Game information

**First quarter**

- BAL – Kaelin Clay 82-yard punt return (Justin Tucker kick), 10:12. Ravens 7–0.
- BAL – Justin Tucker 49-yard field goal, 4:26. Ravens 10–0. **Drive: 7 plays, 39 yards, 3:11.**

**Second quarter**

- CLE – Travis Coons 31-yard field goal, 11:30. Ravens 10–3. **Drive: 14 plays, 67 yards, 7:55.**
- BAL – Javorius Allen 13-yard pass from Matt Schaub (Justin Tucker kick), 10:05. Ravens 17–3. **Drive: 3 plays, 60 yards, 1:29.**
- CLE – Marlon Moore 10-yard pass from Josh McCown (Travis Coons kick), 4:46. Ravens 17–10. **Drive: 9 plays, 69 yards, 5:22.**
- CLE – Travis Coons 21-yard field goal, 0:05. Ravens 17–13. **Drive: 9 plays, 58 yards, 2:35.**

**Third quarter**

- CLE – Karlos Dansby 52-yard interception return (Travis Coons kick), 12:27. Browns 20–17.
- BAL – Kamar Aiken 15-yard pass from Matt Schaub (Justin Tucker kick), 5:37. Ravens 24–20. **Drive: 12 plays, 80 yards, 6:46.**

**Fourth quarter**

- BAL – Justin Tucker 35-yard field goal, 9:09. Ravens 27–20. **Drive: 17 plays, 82 yards, 8:07.**
- CLE – Travis Benjamin 42-yard pass from Austin Davis (Travis Coons kick), 1:55. Tied 27–27. **Drive: 6 plays, 71 yards, 2:33.**
- BAL – Will Hill 64-yard blocked field goal return (run failed), 0:00. Ravens 33–27.

**Top passers**

- BAL – Matt Schaub – 20/34, 232 yards, 2 TD, 2 INT
- CLE – Josh McCown – 21/38, 212 yards, TD

**Top rushers**

- BAL – Javorius Allen – 12 rushes, 55 yards
- CLE – Duke Johnson – 7 rushes, 27 yards

**Top receivers**

- BAL – Kamar Aiken – 6 receptions, 80 yards, TD
- CLE – Gary Barnidge – 7 receptions, 91 yards

**Top tacklers**

- BAL – Lardarius Webb – 7 tackles
- CLE – Donte Whitner, Tashaun Gipson – 6 tackles each

ESPN's Monday Night Football returned to Cleveland for the first time in 7 years in a repeat of the AFC North Division rivals.

With just 3 seconds left to play in regulation with the game tied at 27–27, Browns kicker Travis Coons lined up for what would have been the game-winning field goal, but the kick was blocked at the line of scrimmage, which was the rookie's first miss of the season. Ravens safety Will Hill then scooped up the live ball and returned it 64 yards for the game-winning touchdown as time expired. Their record was now 2–14 all time against the Ravens in the Harbaugh-Flacco era.

With the loss, the Browns dropped to 2–9, which guaranteed them their eighth consecutive losing season. Critics later evaluated the contest as one of the five worst defeats in the history of the Browns and the city of Cleveland.

==== Week 13: vs. Cincinnati Bengals ====
Week Thirteen: Cincinnati Bengals at Cleveland Browns – Game summary

Quarter	1	2	3	4	Total
**Bengals**	7	13	14	3	**37**
Browns	0	3	0	0	**3**

at FirstEnergy Stadium, Cleveland, Ohio

- Date: December 6
- Game time: 1:00 pm EST
- Game weather: 45 °F (7 °C), sunny
- Game attendance: 64,775
- Referee: Jeff Triplette
- TV announcers (Fox): Justin Kutcher, Matt Millen and Peter Schrager
- Recap, Gamebook

Game information

**First quarter**

- CIN – Andy Dalton 3-yard run (Mike Nugent kick), 3:48. Bengals 7–0. **Drive: 10 plays, 84 yards, 4:40.**

**Second quarter**

- CIN – A. J. Green 23-yard pass from Andy Dalton (Mike Nugent kick), 13:45. Bengals 14–0. **Drive: 3 plays, 54 yards, 1:15.**
- CIN – Mike Nugent 44-yard field goal, 6:28. Bengals 17–0. **Drive: 6 plays, 34 yards, 3:43.**
- CIN – Mike Nugent 40-yard field goal, 3:24. Bengals 20–0. **Drive: 4 plays, 5 yards, 1:22.**
- CLE – Travis Coons 47-yard field goal, 0:03. Bengals 20–3. **Drive: 10 plays, 50 yards, 3:20.**

**Third quarter**

- CIN – Jeremy Hill 1-yard run (Mike Nugent kick), 7:55. Bengals 27–3. **Drive: 7 plays, 62 yards, 3:30.**
- CIN – Marvin Jones 21-yard pass from Andy Dalton (Mike Nugent kick), 0:46. Bengals 34–3. **Drive: 7 plays, 62 yards, 3:53.**

**Fourth quarter**

- CIN – Mike Nugent 20-yard field goal, 5:47. Bengals 37–3. **Drive: 9 plays, 31 yards, 5:44.**

**Top passers**

- CIN – Andy Dalton – 14/19, 220 yards, 2 TD
- CLE – Austin Davis – 25/38, 230 yards, INT

**Top rushers**

- CIN – Jeremy Hill – 22 rushes, 98 yards, TD
- CLE – Isaiah Crowell – 11 rushes, 62 yards

**Top receivers**

- CIN – A. J. Green – 5 receptions, 128 yards, TD
- CLE – Brian Hartline – 8 receptions, 83 yards

**Top tacklers**

- CIN – Vontaze Burfict – 6 tackles, 2 assists
- CLE – Craig Robertson – 5 tackles, 2 assists

The Bengals dominated the Browns in every aspect of the game enroute to a 37–3 win. The Browns started third-string quarterback Austin Davis, as Josh McCown was placed on IR earlier that week and Johnny Manziel was being disciplined for his antics during the team's bye week. Davis threw for 230 yards and an interception, while his counterpart, Bengals QB Andy Dalton threw two touchdown passes to A. J. Green and Marvin Jones while running for a touchdown himself.

With their seventh straight loss, the Browns dropped to 2–10 and became the first team in the league to be mathematically eliminated from playoff contention for the season. This marked the 13th straight year that the team missed the playoffs. It was also their 13th consecutive loss in the month of the December. The 34-point margin of defeat was the team's largest since Week 16 of the 2005 season, when they lost to the Pittsburgh Steelers by 41–0.

==== Week 14: vs. San Francisco 49ers ====
Week Fourteen: San Francisco 49ers at Cleveland Browns – Game summary

Quarter	1	2	3	4	Total
49ers	0	3	0	7	**10**
**Browns**	7	3	7	7	**24**

at FirstEnergy Stadium, Cleveland, Ohio

- Date: December 13
- Game time: 1:00 pm EST
- Game weather: 63 °F (17 °C), overcast
- Game attendance: 63,916
- Referee: John Hussey
- TV announcers (Fox): Joe Davis, Brady Quinn and Peter Schrager
- Recap, Gamebook

Game information

**First quarter**

- CLE – Isaiah Crowell 1-yard run (Travis Coons kick), 5:40. Browns 7–0. **Drive: 6 plays, 84 yards, 3:27.**

**Second quarter**

- CLE – Travis Coons 26-yard field goal, 9:06. Browns 10–0. **Drive: 10 plays, 56 yards, 5:52.**
- SF – Phil Dawson 44-yard field goal, 4:16. Browns 10–3. **Drive: 4 plays, 6 yards, 1:30.**

**Third quarter**

- CLE – Gary Barnidge 2-yard pass from Johnny Manziel (Travis Coons kick), 0:17. Browns 17–3. **Drive: 8 plays, 78 yards, 4:15.**

**Fourth quarter**

- CLE – Isaiah Crowell 3-yard run (Travis Coons kick), 8:53. Browns 24–3. **Drive: 9 plays, 91 yards, 4:47.**
- SF – Jerome Simpson 6-yard pass from Blaine Gabbert (Phil Dawson kick), 1:48. Browns 24–10. **Drive: 8 plays, 94 yards, 1:40.**

**Top passers**

- SF – Blaine Gabbert – 18/28, 194 yards, TD
- CLE – Johnny Manziel – 21/31, 270 yards, TD, INT

**Top rushers**

- SF – Shaun Draughn – 11 rushes, 43 yards
- CLE – Isaiah Crowell – 20 rushes, 145 yards, 2 TD

**Top receivers**

- SF – Blake Bell – 3 receptions, 49 yards
- CLE – Brian Hartline – 8 receptions, 107 yards

**Top tacklers**

- SF – Kenneth Acker – 8 tackles, 3 assists
- CLE – Armonty Bryant – 7 tackles (2 sacks)

With the win, the Browns snapped their seven-game losing streak and improved to 3–10. This is the Browns' last win until Week 16, 2016 against the San Diego Chargers.

==== Week 15: at Seattle Seahawks ====
Week Fifteen: Cleveland Browns at Seattle Seahawks – Game summary

Quarter	1	2	3	4	Total
Browns	7	3	0	3	**13**
**Seahawks**	7	13	0	10	**30**

at CenturyLink Field, Seattle, Washington

- Date: December 20
- Game time: 4:05 pm EST/1:05pm PST
- Game weather: 47 °F (8 °C), cloudy
- Game attendance: 69,002
- Referee: Gene Steratore
- TV announcers (Fox): Thom Brennaman, Charles Davis and Tony Siragusa
- Recap, Gamebook

Game information

**First quarter**

- CLE – Gary Barnidge 7-yard pass from Johnny Manziel (Travis Coons kick), 8:13. Browns 7–0. **Drive: 15 plays, 80 yards, 6:53.**
- SEA – Doug Baldwin 3-yard pass from Russell Wilson (Steven Hauschka kick), 0:47. Tied 7–7. **Drive: 14 plays, 69 yards, 7:24.**

**Second quarter**

- SEA – Doug Baldwin 6-yard pass from Russell Wilson (Steven Hauschka kick), 10:01. Seahawks 14–7. **Drive: 8 plays, 57 yards, 3:52.**
- CLE – Travis Coons 34-yard field goal, 6:35. Seahawks 14–10. **Drive: 8 plays, 36 yards, 3:25.**
- SEA – Steven Hauschka 49-yard field goal, 1:00. Seahawks 17–10. **Drive: 12 plays, 57 yards, 5:36.**
- SEA – Steven Hauschka 27-yard field goal, 0:00. Seahawks 20–10. **Drive: 4 plays, 64 yards, 0:16.**

**Third quarter**

- No scoring plays

**Fourth quarter**

- SEA – Tyler Lockett 27-yard pass from Russell Wilson (Steven Hauschka kick), 15:00. Seahawks 27–10. **Drive: 10 plays, 96 yards, 6:00.**
- CLE – Travis Coons 37-yard field goal, 9:07. Seahawks 27–13. **Drive: 9 plays, 61 yards, 5:52.**
- SEA – Steven Hauschka 30-yard field goal, 3:37. Seahawks 30–13. **Drive: 13 plays, 68 yards, 5:28.**

**Top passers**

- CLE – Johnny Manziel – 19/32, 161 yards, TD, INT
- SEA – Russell Wilson – 21/30, 249 yards, 3 TD

**Top rushers**

- CLE – Duke Johnson – 4 rushes, 46 yards
- SEA – Christine Michael – 16 rushes, 84 yards

**Top receivers**

- CLE – Duke Johnson – 5 receptions, 39 yards
- SEA – Jermaine Kearse – 7 receptions, 110 yards

**Top tacklers**

- CLE – Karlos Dansby – 4 tackles, 6 assists
- SEA – Kelcie McCray – 5 tackles, 3 assists, 1 pass defended

With the loss, the Browns fell to 3–11 and they finished 1-3 against the NFC West.

==== Week 16: at Kansas City Chiefs ====
Week Sixteen: Cleveland Browns at Kansas City Chiefs – Game summary

Quarter	1	2	3	4	Total
Browns	0	3	7	3	**13**
**Chiefs**	10	7	0	0	**17**

at Arrowhead Stadium, Kansas City, Missouri

- Date: December 27
- Game time: 1:00 pm EST/12:00 pm CST
- Game weather: 36 °F (2 °C), cloudy
- Game attendance: 69,115
- Referee: Walt Anderson
- TV announcers (CBS): Kevin Harlan and Rich Gannon
- Recap, Gamebook

Game information

**First quarter**

- KC – Jeremy Maclin 11-yard pass from Alex Smith (Cairo Santos kick), 7:57. Chiefs 7–0. **Drive: 11 plays, 65 yards, 7:08.**
- KC – Cairo Santos 40-yard field goal, 2:24. Chiefs 10–0. **Drive: 9 plays, 39 yards, 4:43.**

**Second quarter**

- CLE – Travis Coons 45-yard field goal, 9:02. Chiefs 10–3. **Drive: 7 plays, 29 yards, 3:36.**
- KC – Travis Kelce 13-yard pass from Alex Smith (Cairo Santos kick), 0:36. Chiefs 17–3. **Drive: 5 plays, 56 yards, 1:03.**

**Third quarter**

- CLE – Isaiah Crowell 10-yard run (Travis Coons kick), 9:21. Chiefs 17–10. **Drive: 9 plays, 82 yards, 5:45.**

**Fourth quarter**

- CLE – Travis Coons 36-yard field goal, 8:31. Chiefs 17–13. **Drive: 21 plays, 62 yards, 12:01.**

**Top passers**

- CLE – Johnny Manziel – 13/32, 136 yards, INT
- KC – Alex Smith – 15/22, 125 yards, 2 TD, INT

**Top rushers**

- CLE – Johnny Manziel – 11 rushes, 108 yards
- KC – Charcandrick West – 14 rushes, 62 yards

**Top receivers**

- CLE – Gary Barnidge – 3 receptions, 47 yards
- KC – Jeremy Maclin – 5 receptions, 49 yards, TD

**Top tacklers**

- CLE – Donte Whitner – 6 tackles
- KC – Ron Parker, Josh Mauga – 7 tackles each

With the loss, and the Ravens win over the Steelers, the Browns were swept by the AFC West and they were guaranteed to finish dead last in the AFC North. Cleveland also finished 1-7 on the road.

==== Week 17: vs. Pittsburgh Steelers ====
Week Seventeen: Pittsburgh Steelers at Cleveland Browns – Game summary

Quarter	1	2	3	4	Total
**Steelers**	7	7	3	11	**28**
Browns	3	6	0	3	**12**

at FirstEnergy Stadium, Cleveland, Ohio

- Date: January 3, 2016
- Game time: 1:00 pm EST
- Game weather: 34 °F (1 °C), cloudy
- Game attendance: 66,693
- Referee: Pete Morelli
- TV announcers (CBS): Greg Gumbel, Trent Green and Jamie Erdahl
- Recap, Gamebook

Game information

**First quarter**

- PIT – Heath Miller 2-yard pass from Ben Roethlisberger (Chris Boswell kick), 7:12. Steelers 7–0. **Drive: 8 plays, 70 yards, 4:18.**
- CLE – Travis Coons 29-yard field goal, 1:15. Steelers 7–3. **Drive: 6 plays, 13 yards, 2:10.**

**Second quarter**

- CLE – Travis Coons 39-yard field goal, 2:00. Steelers 7–6. **Drive: 11 plays, 31 yards, 5:18.**
- PIT – Antonio Brown 17-yard pass from Ben Roethlisberger (Chris Boswell kick), 1:02. Steelers 14–6. **Drive: 6 plays, 80 yards, 0:58.**
- CLE – Travis Coons 33-yard field goal, 0:03. Steelers 14–9. **Drive: 9 plays, 65 yards, 0:58.**

**Third quarter**

- PIT – Chris Boswell 39-yard field goal, 9:43. Steelers 17–9. **Drive: 7 plays, 74 yards, 2:33.**

**Fourth quarter**

- CLE – Travis Coons 29-yard field goal, 14:57. Steelers 17–12. **Drive: 17 plays, 62 yards, 9:46.**
- PIT – Markus Wheaton 8-yard pass from Ben Roethlisberger (Ben Roethlisberger-Fitzgerald Toussaint pass), 10:49. Steelers 25–12. **Drive: 1 play, 8 yards, 0:06.**
- PIT – Chris Boswell 21-yard field goal, 2:57. Steelers 28–12. **Drive: 6 plays, 25 yards, 2:57.**

**Top passers**

- PIT – Ben Roethlisberger – 24/36, 349 yards, 3 TD, 2 INT
- CLE – Austin Davis – 24/46, 240 yards, 2 INT

**Top rushers**

- PIT – Fitzgerald Toussaint – 12 rushes, 24 yards
- CLE – Isaiah Crowell – 15 rushes, 53 yards

**Top receivers**

- PIT – Antonio Brown – 13 receptions, 187 yards, TD
- CLE – Gary Barnidge – 8 receptions, 66 yards

**Top tacklers**

- PIT – Lawrence Timmons – 7 tackles, 3 assists (1.5 sacks), 1 forced fumble
- CLE – Karlos Dansby – 5 tackles, 2 assists, 1 forced fumble

The Steelers made the playoffs with a closer than the score indicated 28–12 win over the Browns (coupled with a Jets loss to the Bills). The game was competitive for three quarters, but the Browns failed to get into the endzone, scoring four field goals and committing three turnovers (two of them in the fourth quarter, both of which resulted in Steelers scores).

The Browns finished the season with a 3–13 record (2-6 at home & 1-5 against the AFC North), their worst record since the 2000 season (when they also went 3–13). It was tied for their second fewest wins in a season, ahead of only the 1999 Browns, who won two games and went 2–14 that season. GM Ray Farmer was immediately fired after the final game, along with head coach Mike Pettine, who had lost 18 of his last 21 games going back to Week 13 of the previous season.

=== 2016 Pro Bowl ===
Despite the team's awful performance on the field, T Joe Thomas and C Alex Mack were invited to the 2016 Pro Bowl. This marks Thomas' 9th consecutive Pro Bowl selection and ties him with Hall of Famers Lou Groza and Jim Brown for the most pro bowl selections in Browns history. This marks Mack's 3rd appearance in the game.

Special teamer Johnson Bademosi, TE Gary Barnidge, and WR Travis Benjamin were named as alternates at their respective positions.

== Standings ==
=== Division ===
AFC North
	W	L	T	PCT	DIV	CONF	PF	PA	STK
^{(3)} Cincinnati Bengals	12	4	0	.750	5–1	9–3	419	279	W1
^{(6)} Pittsburgh Steelers	10	6	0	.625	3–3	7–5	423	319	W1
Baltimore Ravens	5	11	0	.313	3–3	4–8	328	401	L1
Cleveland Browns	3	13	0	.188	1–5	2–10	278	432	L3

=== Conference ===
AFC
#	Team	Division	W	L	T	PCT	DIV	CONF	SOS	SOV	STK
Division Leaders
1 (Note: Denver finished ahead of New England and Cincinnati for the No. 1 seed based on head-to-head sweep. New England finished ahead of Cincinnati for the No. 2 seed based on record vs. common opponents — New England's cumulative record against Buffalo, Denver, Houston and Pittsburgh was 4–1, while Cincinnati's cumulative record against the same four teams was 2–3.)	Denver Broncos	West	12	4	0	.750	4–2	8–4	.500	.479	W2
2	New England Patriots	East	12	4	0	.750	4–2	9–3	.473	.448	L2
3	Cincinnati Bengals	North	12	4	0	.750	5–1	9–3	.477	.406	W1
4	Houston Texans	South	9	7	0	.563	5–1	7–5	.496	.410	W3
Wild Cards
5	Kansas City Chiefs	West	11	5	0	.688	5–1	10–2	.496	.432	W10
6 (Note: Pittsburgh finished ahead of the New York Jets for the No. 6 seed and qualified for the last playoff spot based on record vs. common opponents — Pittsburgh's cumulative record against Cleveland, Indianapolis, New England and Oakland was 4–1, while the Jets' cumulative record against the same four teams was 3–2.)	Pittsburgh Steelers	North	10	6	0	.625	3–3	7–5	.504	.463	W1
Did not qualify for the postseason
7	New York Jets	East	10	6	0	.625	3–3	7–5	.441	.388	L1
8 (Note: Buffalo finished ahead of Indianapolis based on head-to-head victory.)	Buffalo Bills	East	8	8	0	.500	4–2	7–5	.508	.438	W2
9	Indianapolis Colts	South	8	8	0	.500	4–2	6–6	.500	.406	W2
10	Oakland Raiders	West	7	9	0	.438	3–3	7–5	.512	.366	L1
11	Miami Dolphins	East	6	10	0	.375	1–5	4–8	.469	.469	W2
12 (Note: Jacksonville finished ahead of Baltimore based on head-to-head victory.)	Jacksonville Jaguars	South	5	11	0	.313	2–4	5–7	.473	.375	L3
13	Baltimore Ravens	North	5	11	0	.313	3–3	4–8	.508	.425	L1
14	San Diego Chargers	West	4	12	0	.250	0–6	3–9	.527	.328	L2
15 (Note: Cleveland finished ahead of Tennessee based on head-to-head victory.)	Cleveland Browns	North	3	13	0	.188	1–5	2–10	.531	.271	L3
16	Tennessee Titans	South	3	13	0	.188	1–5	1–11	.492	.375	L4
Tiebreakers (Note: When breaking ties for three or more teams under the NFL's rules, they are first broken within divisions, then comparing only the highest ranked remaining team from each division.)
