= Dadi Nicolas =

Haitian-born American football player (born 1992)

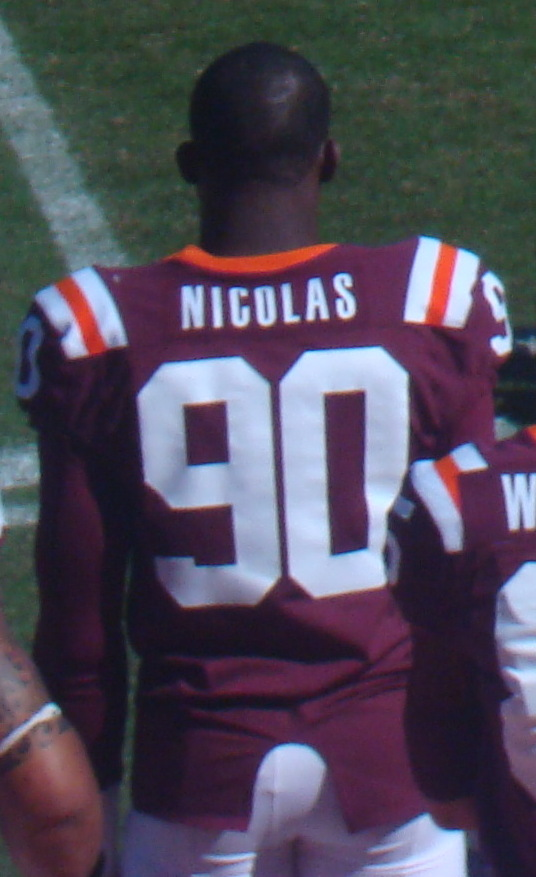
- Nicolas with the Virginia Tech Hokies in 2012

No. 52, 90
- Position: Defensive end

Personal information
- Born: September 29, 1992 (age 34); Port-au-Prince, Haiti
- Listed height: 6 ft 3 in (1.91 m)
- Listed weight: 235 lb (107 kg)

Career information
- High school: Atlantic (Delray Beach, Florida, U.S.)
- College: Virginia Tech
- NFL draft: 2016: 6th round, 203rd overall pick

Career history
- Kansas City Chiefs (2016–2017); Seattle Seahawks (2018)*; Washington Redskins (2018)*; Indianapolis Colts (2019)*; Denver Broncos (2019); Calgary Stampeders (2020–2021)*
- * Offseason or practice squad member only

Awards and highlights
- Second-team All-ACC (2014)
- Stats at Pro Football Reference

Dadi L'homme Nicolas (born September 29, 1992) is a Haitian former professional football defensive end. He attended Atlantic High School in Delray Beach, Florida. He played college football at Virginia Tech, and was selected by the Kansas City Chiefs in the sixth round of the 2016 NFL draft.

== Early life ==
Nicolas was born on September 29, 1992, in Port-au-Prince, Haiti to mother Esperanta Estime. He grew up in Florida and did not begin playing football until his senior year, instead lettering in basketball. During that year, he played for head coach Chris Bean at Atlantic High School and had 70 tackles, 11 sacks, four forced fumbles, and two pass break-ups. He was named to the Honorable mention all-area selection by The Palm Beach Post. He was not highly recruited coming out of high school and enrolled at Virginia Tech on July 6, 2011.

== College career ==
Nicolas began his career with the Virginia Tech Hokies by receiving a redshirt designation while training at the defensive end position. He had a 38-inch vertical jump and ran a 4.63 40 yard dash time. During the annual spring scrimmage, he had four tackles with three for a loss. During May of that year Nicolas was arrested in relation to a bike stolen from the campus dining hall and charged with felony second-degree grand larceny and was indefinitely suspended from the team. He was reinstated to the team on August 30 of that year after the charges were reduced to misdemeanor petty larceny, to which Nicolas plead not guilty. He began his first year of eligibility by receiving the Richard Bullock award for most improved player on the defense in spring practice. During a conference game against the Duke Blue Devils, he had one sack and a forced fumble. Overall, he played in 10 games, 123 snaps on defense and nine on special teams and recorded 17 tackles, 3.5 for a loss, and 2 sacks. He also had one forced fumble and one recovery.

In his sophomore year with the Hokies, Nicolas played in all 13 games that year and started in one of them. During spring training, he broke the program's positional record with a 41-inch vertical. He was awarded the Coaches Award on the defense. He started out the season with a sack in the opener against the Alabama Crimson Tide. During a game later that year in a game against Pittsburgh he had a career-high three sacks. Additionally, he had an interception against Duke. He finished off the year playing 377 snaps, 313 on defense, one on offense, and 63 on special teams. He had four sacks, 32 tackles, seven tackles for loss, and 13 quarterback hurries. He was named as an honorable mention All-American by College Football News.

Beginning his junior year, Nicolas was awarded the President's award for most outstanding leadership in spring practice. He started all 13 games that year. During the second game of the year, he had two sacks against Ohio State and was named the Atlantic Coast Conference (ACC) Defensive Lineman of the Week for his efforts. During a game against Pittsburgh, he blocked a field goal. During the game against Duke, he had two and a half sacks and five hurries and was again named the ACC Defensive Lineman of the Week. His efforts earned him a second-team All-ACC selection.

In his final year with Virginia Tech, Nicolas spent the majority of it rehabilitating a hand that was broken during spring training, an injury that he played with in the regular season. In addition, he had jammed fingers in his left hand. His condition lead to him being called "Lobster Boy" by Line Coach Charles Wiley. Later on in the season, he was suspended for half of the annual rivalry game against the University of Virginia. This suspension stemmed from an incident in which Nicolas made contact with referee Ron Cherry following a penalty being declared on him. Nicolas claimed in the press conference after that it was not intentional. He finished the season with 45 tackles with seven for loss and 2.5 sacks. He was named to the 2015 All-ACC Third-team by the conference's coaches.

== Professional career ==
=== Pre-draft ===
Nicolas was projected by NFL.com and CBS Sports as a mid to late round pick. Lance Zierlein of NFL.com commented that he had quick pass rush moves that can catch slower players off guard. He also complimented his athletic ability and burst to make up ground when chasing ball carriers. However, he was concerned by his lack of strength and size, noting he would probably not continue on the defensive line in the NFL. He also noted he tended to avoid contact, and that he had poor instincts covering the run. Dane Brugler and Rob Rang of CBS Sports also commented on his athleticism and speed, and also commented he was a good special teams player. However, they also noted he did not have the strength and did not believe him to be a point of attack player. They projected him to be an outside linebacker in a 4–3 scheme as opposed to a defensive end.

Pre-draft measurables
| Height | Weight | Arm length | Hand span | 40-yard dash | 10-yard split | 20-yard shuttle | Three-cone drill | Vertical jump | Broad jump | Bench press |
|---|---|---|---|---|---|---|---|---|---|---|
| 6 ft 3 in (1.91 m) | 235 lb (107 kg) | 34 3/4 in (0.88 m) | 10 3/8 in (0.26 m) | 4.74 s | 1.70 s | 4.38 s | 7.04 s | 41 in (1.04 m) | 9 ft 8 in (2.95 m) | 14 reps |
All values from NFL Combine /

=== Kansas City Chiefs ===
Nicolas was selected by the Kansas City Chiefs in the sixth round, 203rd overall, of the 2016 NFL draft. Adam Teicher of ESPN.com commented that he was too light to play on the defensive line and he'd have to add some weight to be a viable outside linebacker. He commented that he would possibly end up on the practice squad as a rookie. During the rookie minicamp that year, Nicolas commented that playing in the NFL was "very different" and that he was able to understand the game better than he did in college. He also mentioned he wanted to put on more weight and that he believed he had "great potential" at his new position. The Chiefs believed they could use him at the linebacker position while Justin Houston continued recovery from ACL surgery.

Nicolas was placed on injured reserve on January 4, 2017, after suffering a ruptured patellar tendon.

On September 2, 2017, Nicolas was placed on the physically unable to perform list to start the 2017 season due to the injury suffered in January.

Nicolas was traded to the Cleveland Browns on May 2, 2018, in exchange for tight end Randall Telfer. However two days later, the trade was called off and voided without an explanation given from either team. Nicolas was waived by the Chiefs days later.

=== Seattle Seahawks ===
On May 16, 2018, Nicolas signed with the Seattle Seahawks. He was waived by the Seahawks on June 14.

=== Washington Redskins ===
Nicolas signed with the Washington Redskins on August 1, 2018. He was waived by the Redskins on September 1.

=== Indianapolis Colts ===
On May 14, 2019, Nicolas was signed by the Indianapolis Colts. He was waived by Indianapolis on July 24. Nicolas was re-signed by the team on August 2. On August 20, he was waived by the Colts.

=== Denver Broncos ===
On August 21, 2019, Nicolas was claimed off waivers by the Denver Broncos. He was waived/injured on August 31, and placed on injured reserve. Nicolas was waived from injured reserve on September 24.

=== Calgary Stampeders ===
Nicolas signed with the Calgary Stampeders of the Canadian Football League (CFL) on April 16, 2020. After the CFL canceled the 2020 season due to the COVID-19 pandemic, Nicolas chose to opt-out of his contract with the Stampeders on August 26. He re-signed with the Stampeders on February 11, 2021. Nicolas was released by Calgary on July 25.
