= Gary Barnidge =

American football player (born 1985)

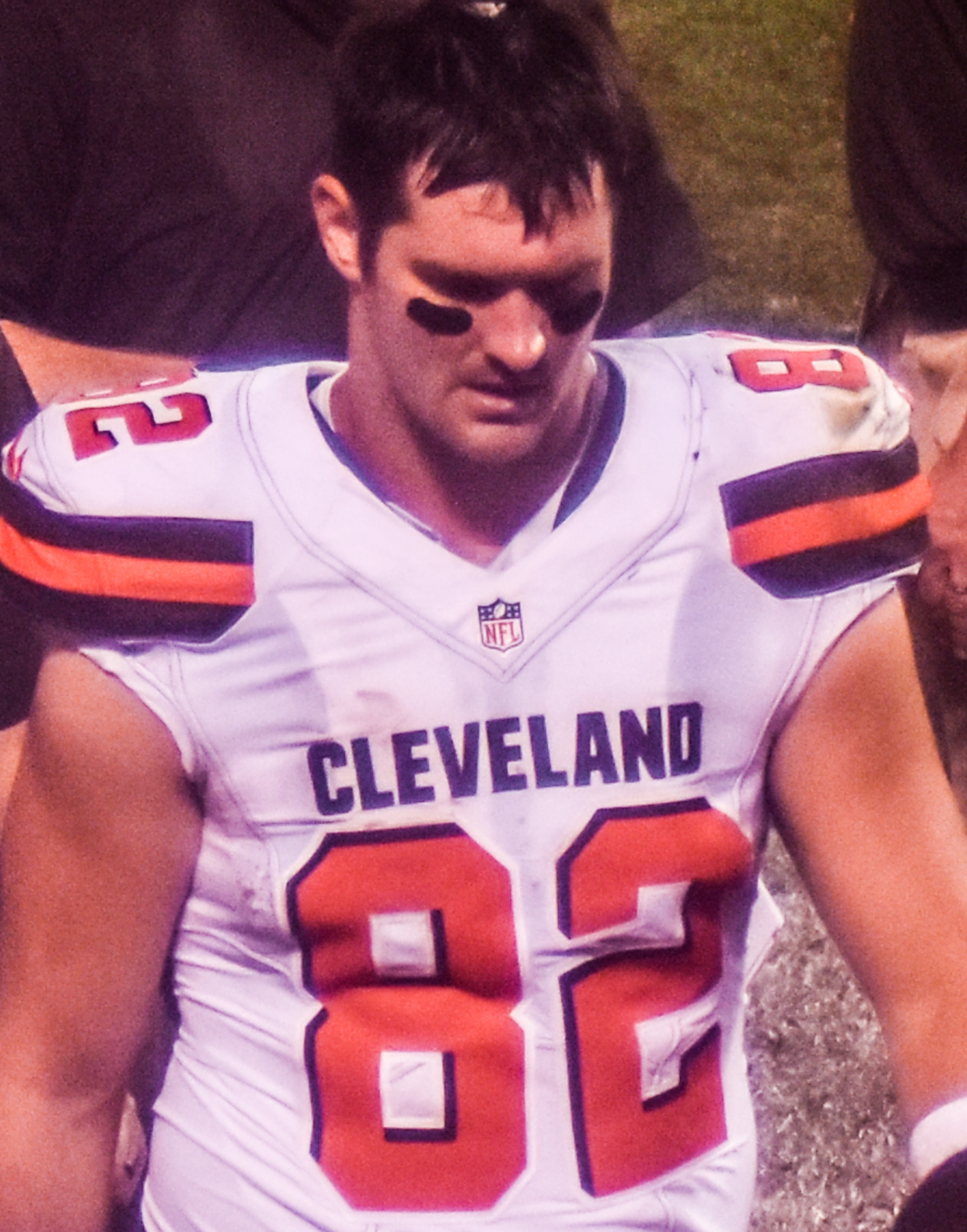
- Barnidge with the Cleveland Browns in 2016

No. 82
- Position: Tight end

Personal information
- Born: September 22, 1985 (age 41); Bowling Green, Kentucky. U.S.
- Listed height: 6 ft 6 in (1.98 m)
- Listed weight: 250 lb (113 kg)

Career information
- High school: Middleburg (Middleburg, Florida)
- College: Louisville (2004–2007)
- NFL draft: 2008: 5th round, 141st overall pick

Career history
- Carolina Panthers (2008–2012); Cleveland Browns (2013–2016)

Awards and highlights
- Pro Bowl (2015); First-team All-Big East (2007)

Career NFL statistics
- Receptions: 178
- Receiving yards: 2,258
- Receiving touchdowns: 14
- Stats at Pro Football Reference

Gary Michael Barnidge (born September 22, 1985) is an American former professional football player who was a tight end in the National Football League (NFL). He was selected by the Carolina Panthers in the fifth round of the 2008 NFL draft (picked 141st overall). He played college football for the Louisville Cardinals. He also played in the NFL for the Cleveland Browns.

== Early life ==
Barnidge was born on September 22, 1985, in Bowling Green, Kentucky. He attended and played high school football at Middleburg High School.

== College career ==
Barnidge played college football at Louisville from 2004 to 2007. As a freshman, he had seven receptions for 85 yards and four touchdowns. As a sophomore, he had 17 receptions for 240 yards and two touchdowns. As a junior, he had 31 receptions for 511 yards and four touchdowns. As a senior, he had 53 receptions for 655 yards and seven touchdowns. In the game against Middle Tennessee State, he had four receptions for 126 yards and two touchdowns to go along with a fumble recovery for a touchdown. He played in 48 games, including 29 starts and recorded 108 receptions for 1,491 yards and 17 touchdowns. He majored in sports administration.

== Professional career ==
=== Carolina Panthers ===
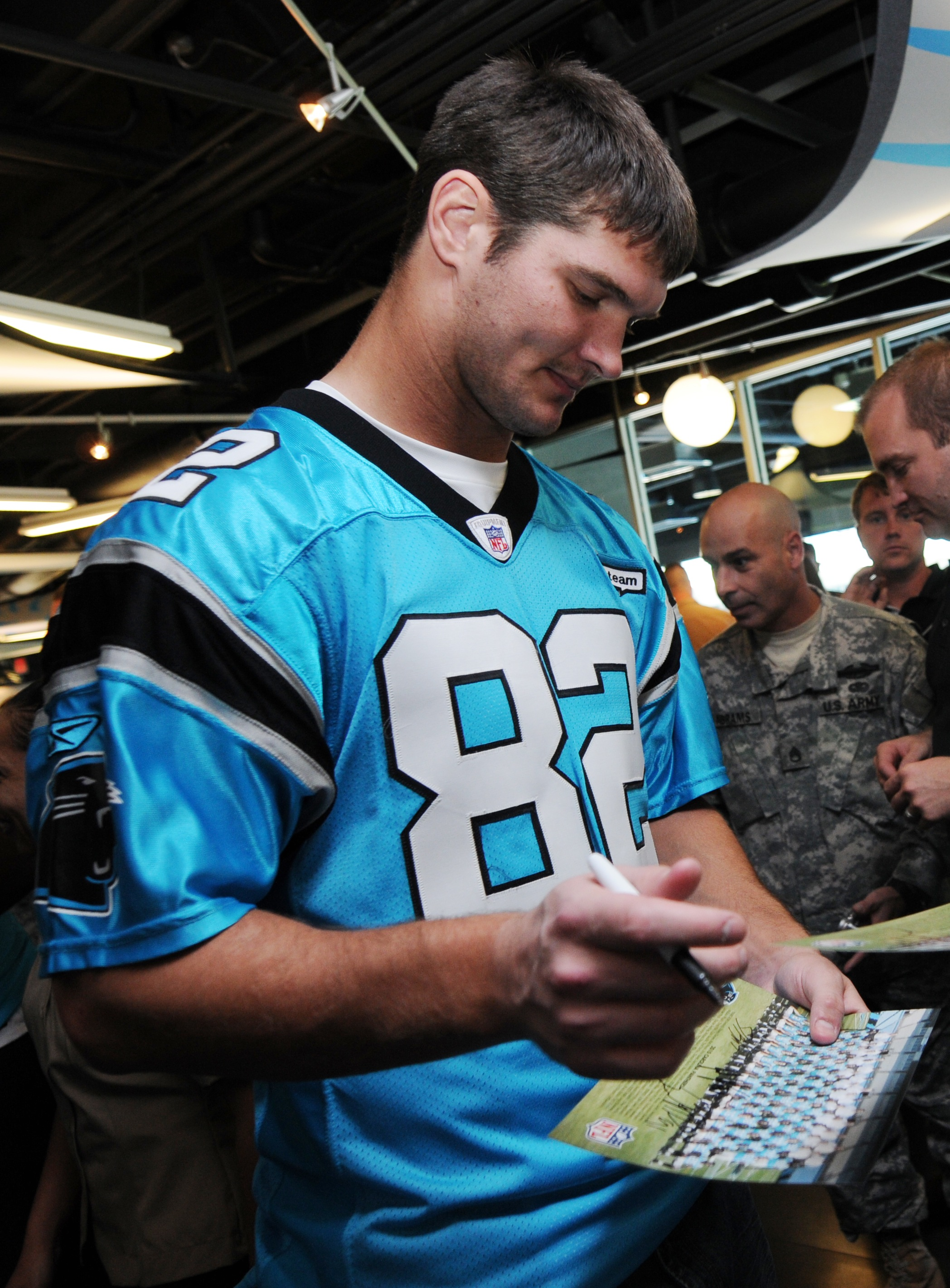
Barnidge signing autographs in 2010.

Barnidge was selected by the Carolina Panthers in the fifth round (141st overall) in the 2008 NFL draft. The Panthers previously acquired the pick from the New York Jets in a trade that sent Kris Jenkins to the Jets.

With the Panthers, Barnidge's main impact came on special-teams. In the 2008 season, he appeared in fifteen games in the regular season and the Divisional Round of the playoffs against the Arizona Cardinals. In the 2009 season, he had 12 receptions for 242 yards. In 2010, he appeared in all 16 games. He missed the whole 2011 NFL season with a broken ankle suffered in a preseason practice. On November 26, 2012, Barnidge recorded his first professional touchdown reception against the Philadelphia Eagles on a 24-yard pass from Cam Newton. Overall, he finished the 2012 season with six receptions for 78 yards and a touchdown.

=== Cleveland Browns ===
On March 14, 2013, Barnidge was signed by the Cleveland Browns as an unrestricted free agent. In the 2013 season, he had 13 receptions for 127 yards and two touchdowns. In the 2014 season, he had 13 receptions for 156 yards. During the 2015 season, Barnidge had a breakout year and finished with 79 receptions for 1,043 receiving yards and nine touchdowns (he had 44 receptions, 603 receiving yards and 3 touchdowns in his previous seven seasons combined). His nine touchdowns tied Hall of Fame tight end Ozzie Newsome's franchise record set in 1979 and ranked No. 4 among all NFL tight ends in 2015. He was voted the best player on the Browns. On December 10, 2015, Barnidge was signed to a 3-year extension worth around $12 million. After the 2015 season, Barnidge made his first Pro Bowl, being voted as an alternate. He was ranked 94th on the NFL Top 100 Players of 2016.

On June 2, 2016, Barnidge underwent a sports hernia surgery. He started all 16 games in 2016, catching 55 passes for 612 yards and two touchdowns.

On April 28, 2017, Barnidge was released by the Browns.

== NFL career statistics ==
Legend
**Bold**	Career high

Year	Team	GP	GS	Receiving					Fumbles	
Year	Team	GP	GS	Rec	Yds	Avg	Lng	TD	FUM	Lost
2008	CAR	15	0	0	0	--	0	0	0	0
2009	CAR	16	3	12	242	**20.2**	**55**	0	**1**	0
2010	CAR	16	3	0	0	--	0	0	0	0
2011	CAR	Did not play due to injury								
2012	CAR	16	5	6	78	13.0	24	1	0	0
2013	CLE	16	12	13	127	9.8	40	2	0	0
2014	CLE	13	2	13	156	12.0	28	0	0	0
2015	CLE	16	13	**79**	**1,043**	13.2	40	**9**	0	0
2016	CLE	16	16	55	612	11.1	43	2	0	0
Total		124	54	178	2,258	12.7	55	14	1	0

== Personal life ==
In 2011, Barnidge, along with friend and Louisville Cardinal teammate Breno Giacomini, then of the Seattle Seahawks, started a not-for-profit organization called American Football without Barriers. The organization hosted its first camp in China in March 2013.

Barnidge has appeared on two episodes of Total Divas, an E! reality television show about female WWE wrestlers showcasing their personal and professional lives, while in and out of the ring. During season 3 of Total Divas, he went on dates with former WWE superstars Rosa Mendes and Summer Rae. He also appeared on an episode of Impact Wrestling in 2017, assisting fellow NFL player DeAngelo Williams. Barnidge also competed with Williams on The Amazing Race 32 and finished in fourth place.
