= Randall Telfer =

American football player (born 1992)

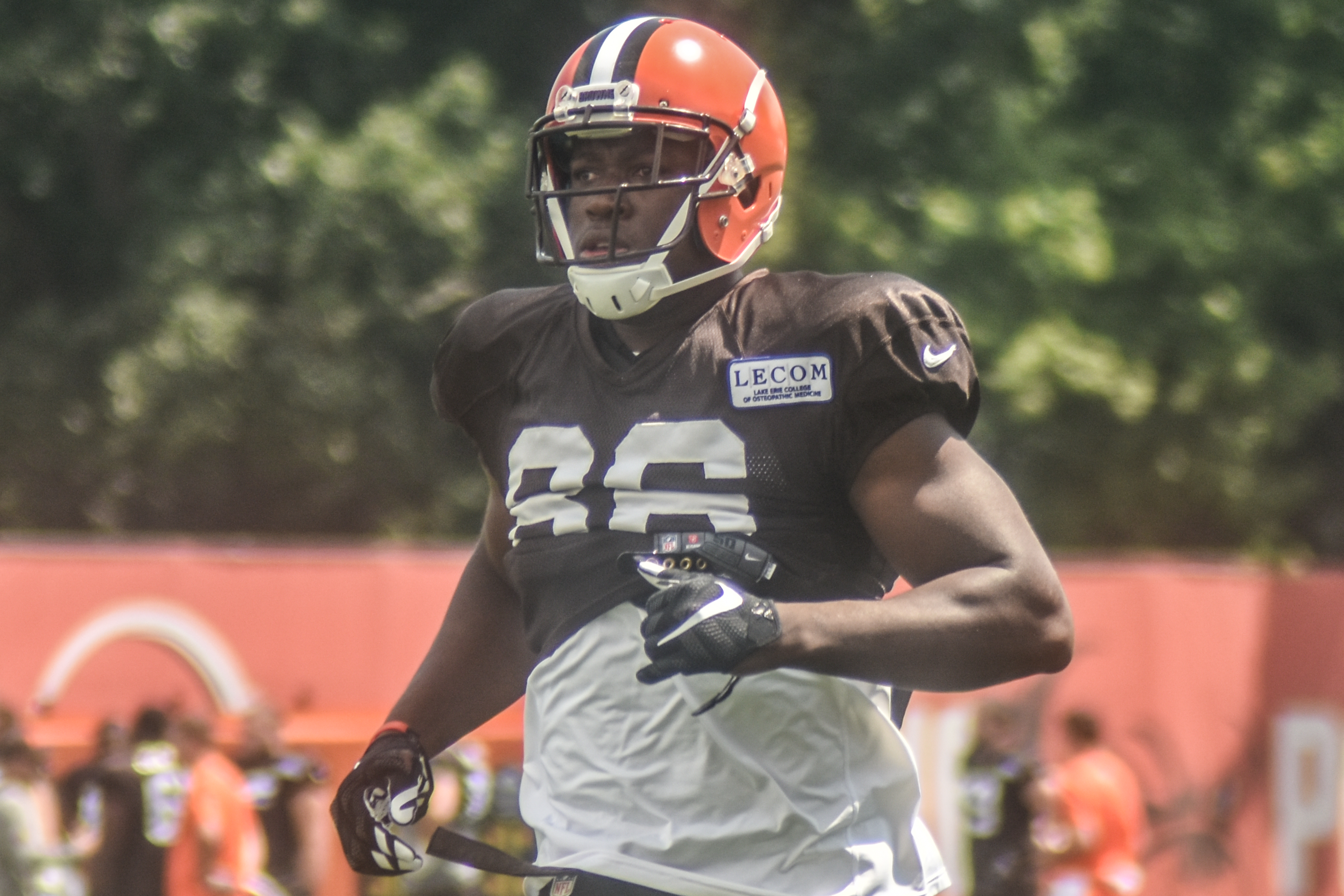
- Telfer with the Cleveland Browns in 2016

No. 86
- Position: Tight end

Personal information
- Born: 16 May 1992 (age 34); Rancho Cucamonga, California, U.S.
- Listed height: 6 ft 4 in (1.93 m)
- Listed weight: 260 lb (118 kg)

Career information
- High school: Rancho Cucamonga
- College: USC
- NFL draft: 2015: 6th round, 198th overall pick

Career history
- Cleveland Browns (2015–2017); Indianapolis Colts (2018)*
- * Offseason or practice squad member only

Career NFL statistics
- Receptions: 5
- Receiving yards: 40
- Stats at Pro Football Reference

Randall Telfer (born May 16, 1992) is an American former professional football player who was a tight end in the National Football League (NFL). He played college football for the USC Trojans. He was selected by the Cleveland Browns in the sixth round of the 2015 NFL draft.

== Early life ==
Telfer was born on May 16, 1992, in Rancho Cucamonga, California. His mother was a physical therapist.

Telfer attended Rancho Cucamonga High School, where he received a 3.5 grade point average. He had no familiarity with football and had never played the game, but head coach Nick Baiz convinced him to begin playing in his freshman year. His height and swiftness led to his being cast as a wide receiver, but he was so poor at catching footballs that he didn't play that year. He played only minimally his sophomore year, but had so rapidly developed as an athlete that he became the team's second receiver in his junior year. In the 2008 season, he caught 42 passes for 677 yards (619 m) and five touchdowns. Rancho Cucamonga won the Southern Section Central Division high school championship football game 21–7 over Upland High School. Telfer caught a touchdown that helped win the game for RCHS.

By his senior year, Telfer had developed into a 6-foot-2-inch (1.88 m), 225-pound (102 kg) receiver with superb blocking skills. Considered one of the state's top college football recruits, he had only played in 14 games.

== College career ==
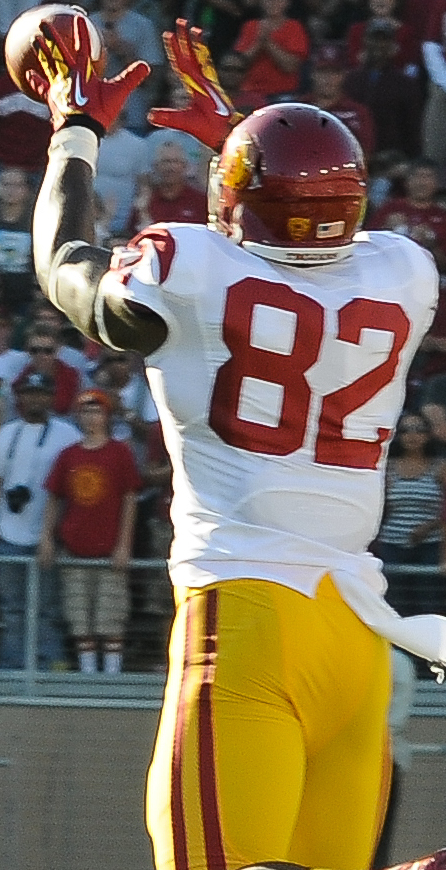
Telfer with USC in 2012

College recruiters saw Telfer more as a tight end than a receiver. He was recruited by eight schools: Arizona State University, Stanford University, the University of California at Los Angeles, the University of Oregon, the University of Southern California (USC), the University of Tennessee, the University of Washington, and Vanderbilt University. He favored Oregon and USC.

Head coach Pete Carroll successfully recruited Telfer for the University of Southern California (USC), where he attended upon receiving an athletic scholarship. He was redshirted his freshman year (the 2010 season), after which Carroll left USC to coach professionally for the Seattle Seahawks. In the spring, the NCAA punished USC for numerous rules and recruiting violations, banning the team from playing in Pac-10 conference championship games and bowl games for two seasons. Telfer had the right to transfer to another school, but declined to do so.

As a sophomore in 2011, Telfer had an outstanding season under head coach Lane Kiffin, catching 26 passes—five of them for touchdowns. He suffered several injuries during the season, but continued to play.

In his junior year, USC began the season ranked Number 1 in the USA Today Coaches' Poll. Telfer had numerous additional injuries, and according to press reports probably should not have continued practicing or playing. Nevertheless, Telfer asked to continue playing, and received permission from coaching staff to do so. Telfer caught a touchdown pass that led USC to defeat the University of Oregon 38-35, a victory that ended the Oregon Ducks' 21-home game winning streak. USC's 2012 season was a dismal one, as the team finished 7-6. The team played in the Sun Bowl, losing 21-7 to the Georgia Tech Yellow Jackets. A violent altercation (which some media reported as a fistfight, while others said it was verbal) broke out in the USC locker room after the game, in which some younger players criticized senior quarterback Matt Barkley for not playing even though injured and for generally poor leadership throughout the season.

Telfer played with numerous leg injuries in the 2013 season. Coaching staff permitted him to play, but counseled him several times that he should take a more prudent approach to his health. USC lost three of its first five games of Telfer's senior season, and Kiffin was fired as head coach on September 29, 2013. Defensive line coach Ed Orgeron was named the interim head coach, and led the team to a 6–2 record. Over the past two seasons, Telfer caught another 18 passes, five for touchdowns.

Steve Sarkisian was named USC's permanent head coach at the end of the 2013 season. Telfer had arthroscopic surgery on a knee in the spring of 2014, which kept him out of spring training camp. Although many in the press predicted he would have the breakout fifth-year season, and Coach Sarkisian told Telfer he would be an "offensive weapon" in the coming year, Telfer was relegated largely to a role as a blocker. The Trojans ended their season playing in the Holiday Bowl, winning 45-42 over the University of Nebraska Cornhuskers. Telfer ended his college football career with 63 receptions, 12 of them for touchdowns. His USC teammates voted to give him the Chris Carlisle Courage Award for starting every game his final year, despite his significant injuries.

Randall Telfer graduated from the University of Southern California in 2013 with a bachelor's degree in political science. In the fall of 2014, he began work at USC on a master's degree in communications management, with an emphasis on marketing.

Telfer suffered a left mid-foot fracture of the tarsometatarsal articulations while playing in the Holiday Bowl. The injury was difficult to diagnose, and he did not undergo surgery to correct the fracture until mid-February 2015. Healing and rehabilitation for such injuries generally lasts four to six months, although eight months is not uncommon.

== Professional career ==
=== Cleveland Browns ===
The Cleveland Browns selected Telfer in the sixth round of the 2015 NFL draft with the 198th overall pick. Telfer signed a four-year contract with the Browns on May 6, 2015, although terms of the deal were not immediately disclosed. A later report said the terms were worth $2.397 million, which included a $117,537 signing bonus.

On July 28, 2015, head coach Mike Pettine announced that Telfer would sit out training camp and remain idle until at least midseason. Pettine said that although some athletes return from mid-foot surgery in four to six months, the team would wait eight months and reevaluate Telfer's ability to play in October.

Telfer played 14 games in the 2016 season under new head coach Hue Jackson, catching two passes for four yards and spending most of his time as a blocker.

On May 2, 2018, Telfer was traded to the Kansas City Chiefs in exchange for linebacker Dadi Nicolas. However two days later, the trade was called off and voided. Telfer was waived by the Browns.

=== Indianapolis Colts ===
On May 7, 2018, Telfer was claimed off waivers by the Indianapolis Colts, only to be waived the next day after failing his physical.

On August 24, 2018, Telfer announced his retirement from the NFL.
