= Darrian Miller =

American football player (born 1993)

Profile
- Position: Offensive tackle

Personal information
- Born: April 8, 1993 (age 33); Irvine, California, U.S.
- Listed height: 6 ft 5 in (1.96 m)
- Listed weight: 307 lb (139 kg)

Career information
- High school: Bryan Station (Lexington, Kentucky)
- College: Kentucky
- NFL draft: 2015: undrafted

Career history
- Cleveland Browns (2015)

Career NFL statistics
- Games played: 6
- Games started: 0
- Stats at Pro Football Reference

Darrian Miller (born April 8, 1993) is an American former professional football player who was an offensive tackle for the Cleveland Browns of the National Football League (NFL). He played college football for the Kentucky Wildcats. He was signed as an undrafted free agent by the Browns, with whom he spent two seasons, while playing in six games.

== Early life ==
Miller was born in Irvine, California, and attended Bryan Station High School in Lexington, Kentucky, where he was named to the second-team all-state team as a junior by the Associated Press. As a senior, he was included on the "Class of the Commonwealth" list of top-22 seniors in the state of Kentucky by the Lexington Herald-Leader. He also was named Second-team All-State by the Louisville Courier-Journal.

He was ranked by Scout.com as one of the nations' top 20 offensive tackles. He was also ranked one of the top 125 players nationally. In his high school career, he played left tackle, left guard and defensive end. He was also a two-year member of the all-city team. He also played in two all-star games, the Kentucky vs. Tennessee Border Bowl and the Kentucky East-West Game.

== College career ==
At Kentucky, Miller, a biology major, started his career as a tight end before switching to offensive tackle where he played in 12 games and started against Central Michigan and Louisville. As a sophomore and junior, he started all 12 games each season. Miller as suspended for Kentucky's season opener due to a violation of team rules.

As an offensive tackle he started 35 of his 47 games played at Kentucky.

== Professional career ==
After going undrafted in the 2015 NFL draft, Miller signed a 4-year $1.58 million contract with the Cleveland Browns. On September 5, he was waived during final cuts. He was signed to the teams practice squad the next day. On November 10, 2015, Miller was promoted to the Browns active roster. On December 5, he was waived by the Browns. On December 8, he was re-signed by the Browns.

== Personal life ==
Miller's the son of Robert and Armida Miller. His sisters are Jacqueline and Andrea Miller.
