= Mike Pettine =

American football player and coach (born 1966)

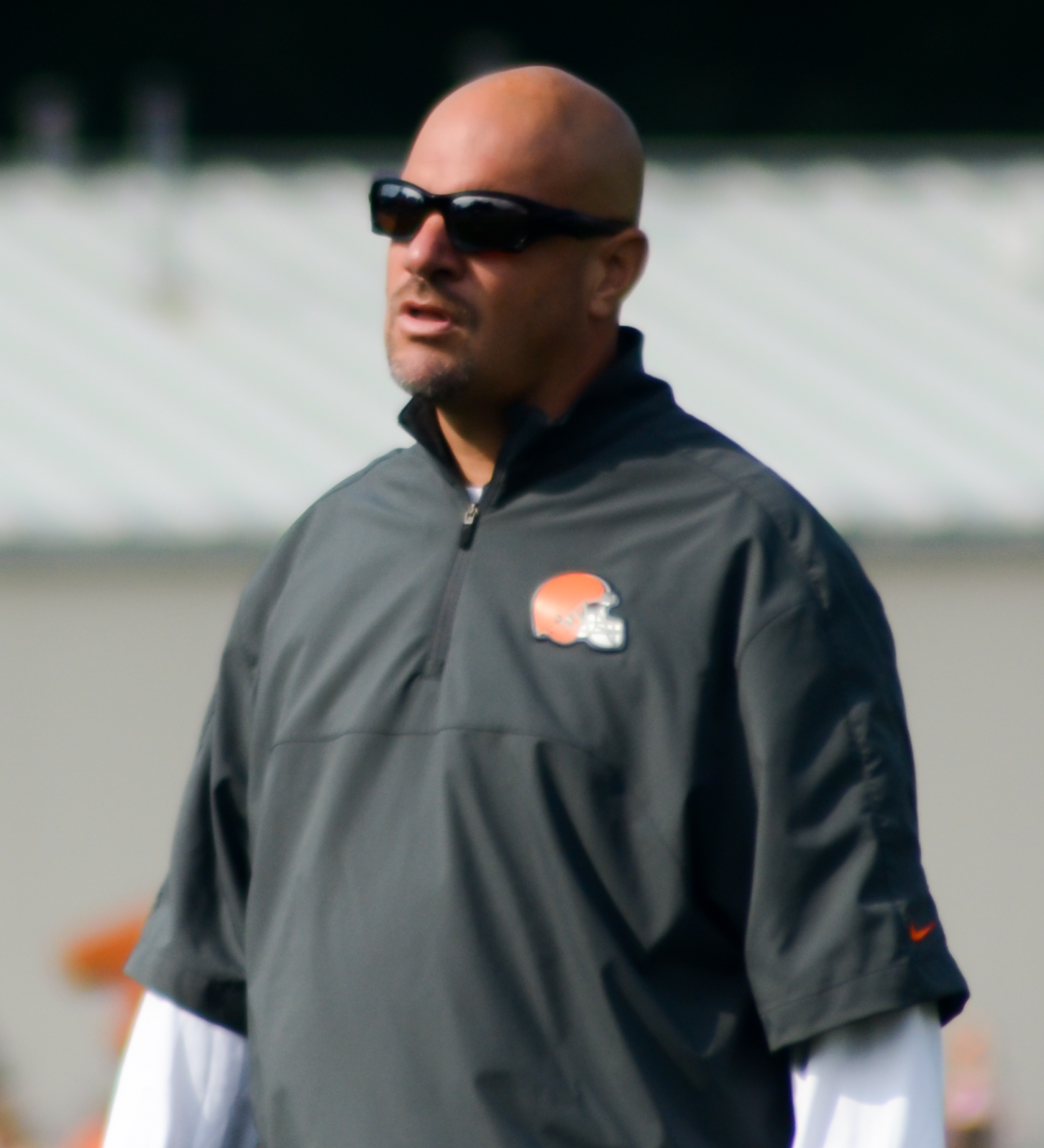
- Pettine in 2014

Dallas Cowboys
- Title: Senior Defense Assistant

Personal information
- Born: September 25, 1966 (age 60); Doylestown, Pennsylvania, U.S.

Career information
- Position: Free safety
- High school: Central Bucks (PA) West
- College: Virginia

Career history
- Pittsburgh (1993–1994) Graduate assistant; William Tennent HS (1995–1996) Head coach; North Penn HS (1997–2001) Head coach; Baltimore Ravens (2002–2008); Coaching assistant (2002–2003); Assistant defensive line coach (2004); Outside linebackers coach (2005–2008); New York Jets (2009–2012) Defensive coordinator; Buffalo Bills (2013) Defensive coordinator; Cleveland Browns (2014–2015) Head coach; Seattle Seahawks (2017) Consultant; Green Bay Packers (2018–2020) Defensive coordinator; Chicago Bears (2021) Senior defensive assistant; Minnesota Vikings (2022–2025); Assistant head coach (2022–2023); Assistant head coach/outside linebackers coach (2024–2025); Dallas Cowboys (2026–present); Senior Defensive Assistant

Head coaching record
- Regular season: NFL: 10–22 (.313)
- Coaching profile at Pro Football Reference

Michael Anthony Pettine Jr. (born September 25, 1966) is a senior defensive assistant for the Dallas Cowboys. In the National Football League (NFL), he was the head coach of the Cleveland Browns from 2014 to 2015, and also served as the defensive coordinator for the Buffalo Bills, New York Jets and Green Bay Packers.

== Playing career ==
Pettine earned all-state honors as a quarterback and defensive back at Central Bucks High School West. The head coach was his father, Mike Pettine Sr., who is renowned in Pennsylvania for compiling a record of 326–42–4 in 33 seasons and winning four state championships.

Pettine played free safety at the University of Virginia graduating in 1988 with a bachelor's degree in economics.

== Coaching career ==
=== High school ===
Pettine coached high school football in Pennsylvania at North Penn and William Tennent high schools after working as a graduate assistant at the University of Pittsburgh (1993–1994). He also spent four years as an assistant coach under his father at Central Bucks West High School. In 1999, a New York Times TV crew documented the North Penn football season for ESPN in a film titled The Season. The TV show consisted of two separate hours and followed the team behind the scenes during the 1999 season and highlighted the rivalry between North Penn and Central Bucks West.

=== National Football League ===
==== Baltimore Ravens ====
Pettine joined the Ravens in 2001 and was promoted to outside linebackers coach four years later when Rex Ryan became defensive coordinator.

==== New York Jets ====
Pettine, as Rex Ryan's "right-hand man", reportedly received a three-year deal to lead the Jets defense. Pettine has been credited with contributing strongly to the Jets number one defense in the NFL in 2009. His tenure with the Jets ended after the 2012 season, with the expiration of his contract.

==== Buffalo Bills ====
Pettine was hired to be the defensive coordinator of the Buffalo Bills on January 9, 2013.

==== Cleveland Browns ====
Pettine was hired to be the head coach of the Cleveland Browns on January 23, 2014. Pettine started 7–4 in the 2014 season, but the Browns lost their final 5 games to finish at 7–9. The Browns were 3–13 the following season. On January 3, 2016, the same day the Browns lost their last game of the season to finish 3–13, Pettine was fired, along with general manager Ray Farmer. Pettine went 10–22 in his two seasons as Cleveland's head coach, losing 18 of his final 21 games.

==== Seattle Seahawks ====
In 2017, Pettine worked as a consultant for the Seattle Seahawks.

==== Green Bay Packers ====
On January 10, 2018, Pettine was hired as defensive coordinator by the Green Bay Packers by head coach Mike McCarthy. On December 2, 2018, the Packers fired McCarthy after a 20–17 loss to the Arizona Cardinals at home, and he was replaced by interim head coach Joe Philbin. On January 7, 2019, the Packers hired Matt LaFleur as their new head coach, who announced he would retain Pettine as defensive coordinator through the 2019 season.

During his time with the Packers, Pettine improved the Packers defense from the league's 29th ranked unit in 2018 to the 15th ranked unit in 2019 and 17th ranked in 2020. However, he was widely criticized for his calls in the playoffs, particularly in the Packers' losses in back-to-back NFC Championship games. In the 2019 NFC Championship Game, Pettine's defense gave up 285 rushing yards to the NFC champion San Francisco 49ers, on their way to a 37–20 loss. In the 2020 NFC Championship Game, the Packers defense picked off quarterback Tom Brady three times, but also gave up a late first-half touchdown when Pettine called for cornerback Kevin King to cover receiver Scotty Miller one-on-one. Pettine's call was widely criticized by many, including his own head coach.

On January 29, 2021, Pettine was let go by the Green Bay Packers as the defensive coordinator; his contract had expired and the Packers reportedly did not move to extend it.

==== Chicago Bears ====
On February 10, 2021, Pettine was hired by the Chicago Bears as a senior defensive assistant under head coach Matt Nagy. Pettine was not retained under new head coach Matt Eberflus.

==== Minnesota Vikings ====
Pettine joined the Minnesota Vikings on February 13, 2022, as the senior defensive assistant under head coach Kevin O'Connell. In 2024, the Vikings added outside linebackers coaching duties to Pettine's responsibilities.

Following the 2025 season, O'Connell announced that Pettine was retiring from coaching.

==== Dallas Cowboys ====
On October 12, 2026, Dallas Cowboys head coach Brian Schottenheimer announced that Pettine has been added as senior defensive assistant. After poor performances by the defense under defensive coordinator Christian Parker, including surrendering 46 points and 584 yards at home to the San Francisco 49ers, Pettine took over playcalling duties on November 18.

== Coaching tree ==
Coaches who served under Pettine and became a head coach

- Kyle Shanahan (San Francisco 49ers, 2017–present)
- Kevin O'Connell (Minnesota Vikings, 2022–present)
- Mike McDaniel (Miami Dolphins, 2022–2025)
- Aaron Glenn (New York Jets, 2025–present)
- Jeff Hafley (Miami Dolphins, 2026–present)

One of Pettine's players became an NCAA head coach

- Brian Hartline (USF, 2026–present)

== Head coaching record ==
Team	Year	Regular season					Postseason			
Team	Year	Won	Lost	Ties	Win %	Finish	Won	Lost	Win %	Result
CLE	2014	7	9	0	.438	4th in AFC North	–	–	–	–
CLE	2015	3	13	0	.188	4th in AFC North	–	–	–	–
Total		10	22	0	.313		0	0	.000	
