= Armonty Bryant =

American football player (born 1990)

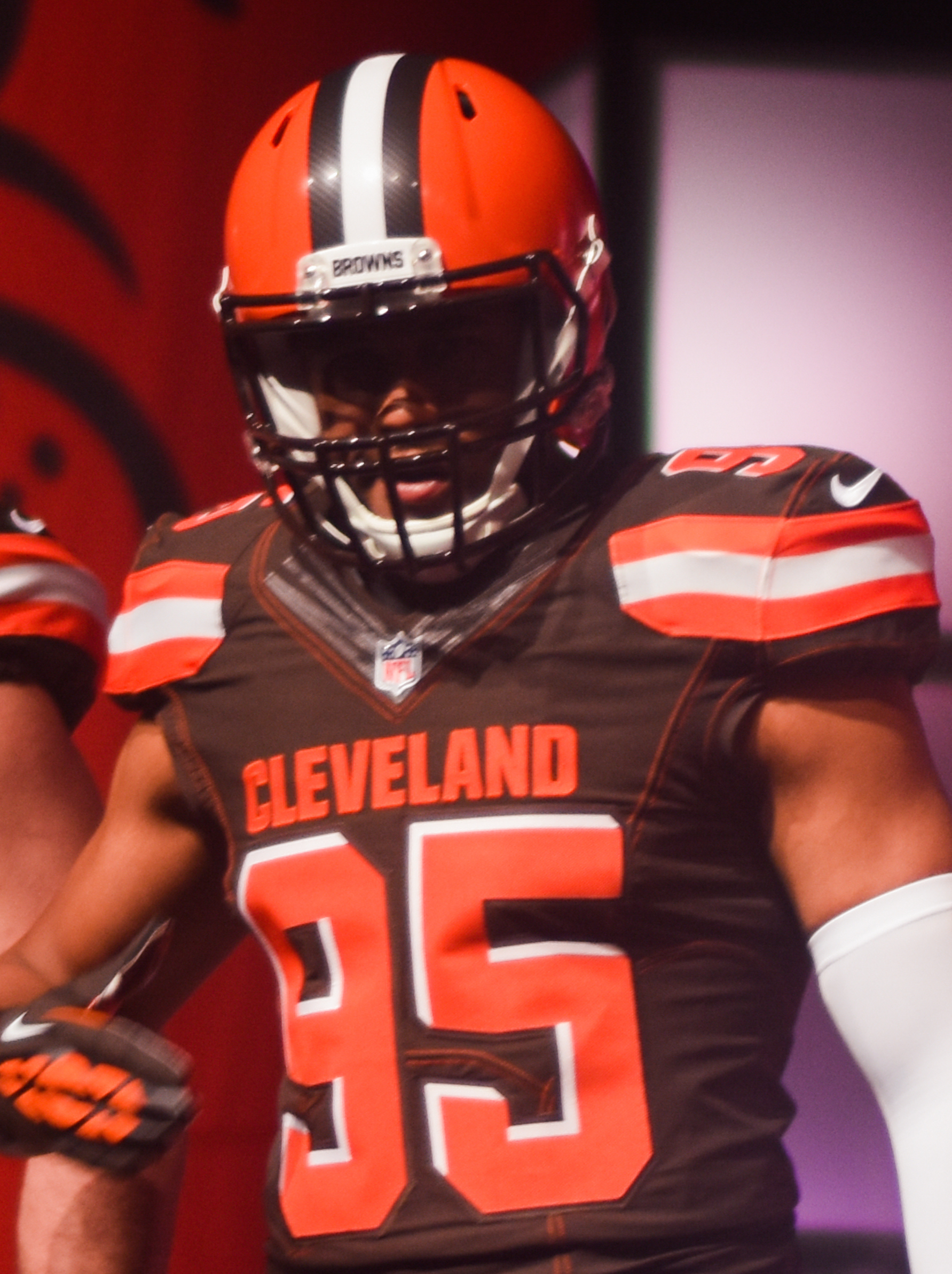
- Bryant with the Cleveland Browns in 2015

No. 95, 97
- Position: Defensive end

Personal information
- Born: May 20, 1990 (age 36); Wichita Falls, Texas, U.S.
- Listed height: 6 ft 4 in (1.93 m)
- Listed weight: 265 lb (120 kg)

Career information
- High school: Wichita Falls
- College: East Central
- NFL draft: 2013: 7th round, 217th overall pick

Career history
- Cleveland Browns (2013–2016); Detroit Lions (2016–2017); Oakland Raiders (2018)*
- * Offseason or practice squad member only

Career NFL statistics
- Total tackles: 68
- Sacks: 11.5
- Forced fumbles: 3
- Fumble recoveries: 1
- Stats at Pro Football Reference

Armonty Charles Bryant (born May 20, 1990) is an American former professional football player who was a defensive end in the National Football League (NFL). He played college football for the Division II East Central Tigers of Ada, Oklahoma. He was selected by the Cleveland Browns in the seventh round of the 2013 NFL draft.

== Professional career ==
=== Cleveland Browns ===
On April 27, 2013, Bryant was selected by the Cleveland Browns in the seventh round, 217th overall pick of the 2013 NFL draft.

He was suspended for the first four games of the 2016 season for violating the performance-enhancing drug policy. He was released by the Browns on October 3, 2016.

=== Detroit Lions ===
On October 4, 2016, Bryant was claimed off waivers by the Lions. Bryant had to serve another three-game suspension for violating the league's policy on substances of abuse. He was activated on December 3, prior to Week 13. He was placed on injured reserve on December 6 with a knee injury.

On March 21, 2017, Bryant re-signed with the Lions. He was suspended once again for the first four games of the 2017 NFL season for violating the NFL's substance abuse policy. On October 9, 2017, after being re-instated from suspension, Bryant was released by the Lions.

=== Oakland Raiders ===
On April 6, 2018, Bryant signed with the Oakland Raiders. On May 4, 2018, he was waived by the Raiders with a non-football illness designation.

=== Retirement ===
On July 16, 2018, Bryant announced his retirement from the NFL.

== Personal life ==
In October 2012, Bryant pleaded no contest following an arrest for selling marijuana twice in a parking lot at East Central University, receiving probation from October 18, 2012, to October 18, 2017. In May 2013, he was given a one-year deferred sentence after he pleaded no contest to a charge of driving under the influence of alcohol. Bryant was indicted on two felony drug possession charges in February 2016 after being arrested following a traffic stop on December 25, 2015, for speeding. During a search of the vehicle, Ohio Highway Patrol officers discovered two pills of Oxycodone and one Adderall.

As of February 2019, Bryant is being treated for focal segmental glomerulosclerosis (FSGS), which has led to kidney failure and requires dialysis.
