= Charles Gaines (American football) =

American football player (born 1992)

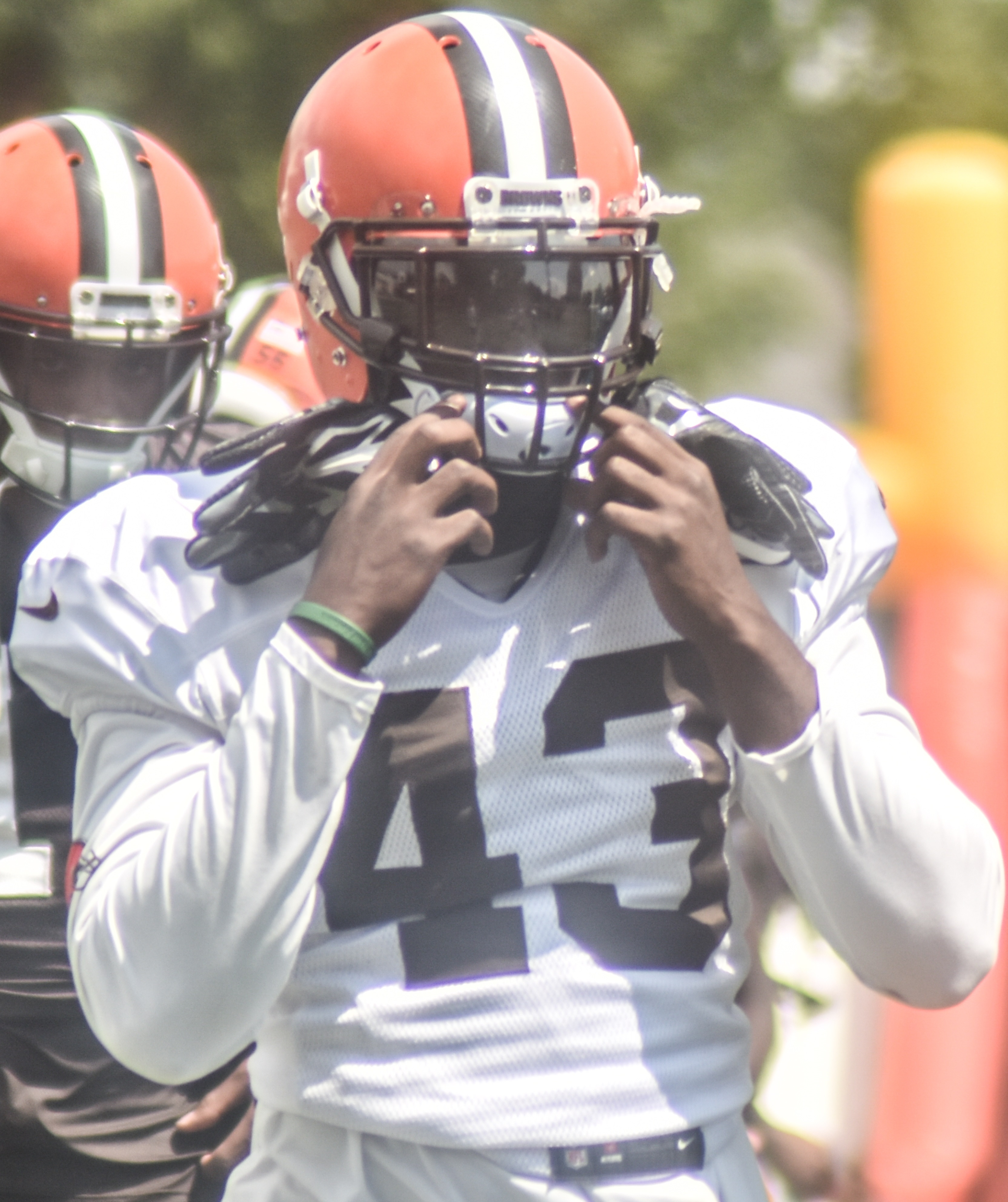
- Gaines with the Cleveland Browns in 2016

No. 43
- Position: Cornerback

Personal information
- Born: October 3, 1992 (age 34); Miami, Florida, U.S.
- Listed height: 5 ft 10 in (1.78 m)
- Listed weight: 180 lb (82 kg)

Career information
- High school: Miami Central
- College: Louisville
- NFL draft: 2015: 6th round, 189th overall pick

Career history
- Cleveland Browns (2015); Buffalo Bills (2016)*; Jacksonville Jaguars (2017)*
- * Offseason or practice squad member only

Awards and highlights
- First-team All-AAC (2013); Third-team All-ACC (2014)

Career NFL statistics
- Total tackles: 15
- Forced fumbles: 1
- Pass deflections: 2
- Stats at Pro Football Reference

Charles Gaines Jr. (born October 3, 1992) is an American former professional football player who was a cornerback in the National Football League (NFL). He played college football for the Louisville Cardinals.

== Early life ==
Gaines attended Miami Central High School in Miami, Florida, where he was part of the same graduating class as teammates Rakeem Cato, Tommy Shuler, Durell Eskridge and Devonta Freeman. As a senior, he helped lead his team to a class 6-A state title, recording a second quarter interception which he returned for a touchdown.

Considered a three-star recruit by Rivals.com, he was rated as the 43rd best wide receiver prospect of his class. On September 26, 2010, he accepted a scholarship and committed to the University of Louisville.

== College career ==
Gaines redshirted as a true freshman in 2011, after enrolling early in January 2011 with Teddy Bridgewater. In 2012, as a wide receiver, he caught 11 passes for 172 yards and one touchdown, but missed the final five games of the season due to a suspension, his second one that year. He returned to the team in April 2013, where he was moved to cornerback. He played in all 13 games, making 11 starts. He recorded 22 tackles and a team leading five interceptions, and earned first-team All-American Athletic Conference (AAC) honors. In 2014, he started 11 games for the Cardinals, recording 36 tackles with two interceptions.

Following the season, he announced he would forgo his remaining eligibility and enter the 2015 NFL draft.

== Professional career ==
=== Cleveland Browns ===
Gaines drafted by the Cleveland Browns in the sixth round, 189th overall, of the 2015 NFL draft. On May 10, 2015, Gaines signed a four-year, $2.402 million contract with the Browns, which included a $122,137 signing bonus. On September 3, 2016, he was released by the Browns.

=== Buffalo Bills ===
On December 7, 2016, Gaines was signed to the practice squad of the Buffalo Bills. He signed a reserve/future contract with the Bills on January 2, 2017. Gaines was waived by the Bills on May 25.

=== Jacksonville Jaguars ===
On July 31, 2017, Gaines signed with the Jacksonville Jaguars. He was waived/injured on August 20, and placed on injured reserve. Gaines was released by the Jaguars on August 25.
