= Kamar Aiken =

American football player (born 1989)

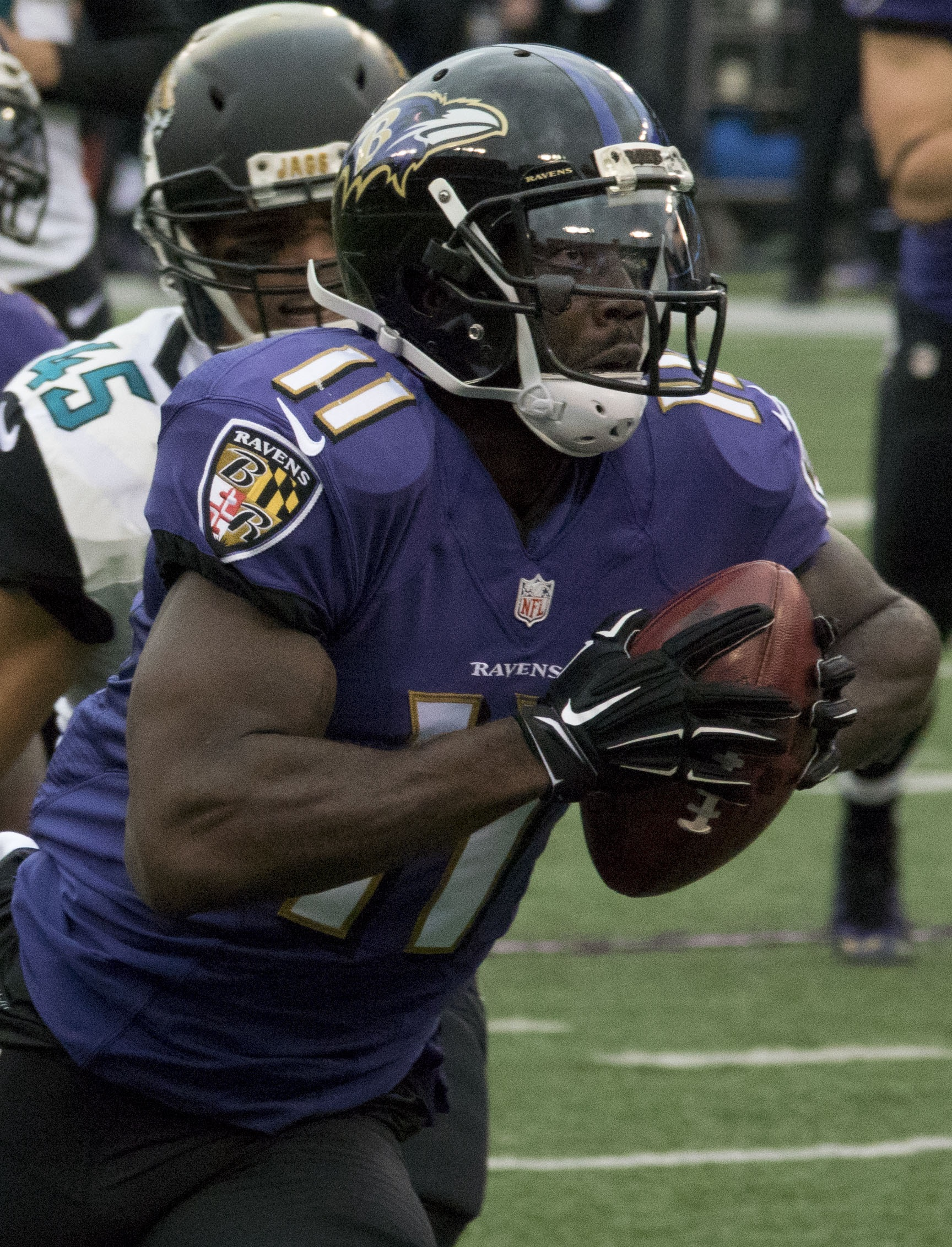
- Aiken with the Baltimore Ravens in 2014

No. 88, 16, 11, 17, 81
- Position: Wide receiver

Personal information
- Born: May 30, 1989 (age 37); Miami, Florida, U.S.
- Listed height: 6 ft 2 in (1.88 m)
- Listed weight: 216 lb (98 kg)

Career information
- High school: Chaminade-Madonna College Prep (Hollywood, Florida)
- College: UCF
- NFL draft: 2011: undrafted

Career history
- Buffalo Bills (2011–2012); Chicago Bears (2012)*; New England Patriots (2012); Baltimore Ravens (2013–2016); Indianapolis Colts (2017); Philadelphia Eagles (2018)
- * Offseason or practice squad member only

Career NFL statistics
- Receptions: 149
- Receiving yards: 1,725
- Receiving touchdowns: 9
- Stats at Pro Football Reference

Kamar Aiken (born May 30, 1989), is an American former professional football player who was a wide receiver in the National Football League (NFL). He played college football for the UCF Knights and was signed by the Buffalo Bills as an undrafted free agent in 2011. He also played for the New England Patriots, Baltimore Ravens, Indianapolis Colts, and Philadelphia Eagles.

== Early life ==
When Aiken was barely 5 years old, his cousin was beaten and killed by the family's babysitter. His mother, Juliet Wint, was questioned by the police. She was at work that day as a nursing assistant at a nearby hospital. His mother was charged with second-degree murder and aggravated child abuse. His mother's lawyer told her she should take a plea bargain, one that came with five years in prison. With that, Aiken's older brother Leon and his younger sister, Shakoiya went into a nearby shelter. They stayed there for about a month before being transferred into foster care. His mother was released from prison early on probation after three years. Aiken's brother Leon was the first person to put a football in his hands. Aiken attended Chaminade-Madonna College Preparatory where he lettered two years in football. He earned Class 2A All-State honors by the Florida Sports Writers and Miami Herald All-Broward County First Team Honors. He was also a stand out in basketball with All-County and All-State accolades.

== Professional career ==
Pre-draft measurables
Height	Weight	40-yard dash	10-yard split	20-yard split	20-yard shuttle	Three-cone drill	Vertical jump	Broad jump	Bench press
6 ft 1 1/8 in (1.86 m)	213 lb (97 kg)	4.45 s	1.57 s	2.59 s	4.63 s	7.19 s	36.5 in (0.93 m)	10 ft 8 in (3.25 m)	17 reps
All values from Pro Day

=== Buffalo Bills ===
Aiken was signed by the Buffalo Bills as an undrafted free agent on July 28, 2011. He was waived by the Bills on September 3, and was re-signed to the team's practice squad the following day. He was promoted to the active roster on November 22, 2011.

On August 31, 2012, Aiken was waived by the Bills and was re-signed to the practice squad the next day. He was released by the Bills on October 3.

=== Chicago Bears ===
Aiken was signed to the Chicago Bears' practice squad on October 9, 2012. On November 6, Aiken was waived by the Bears.

=== New England Patriots ===
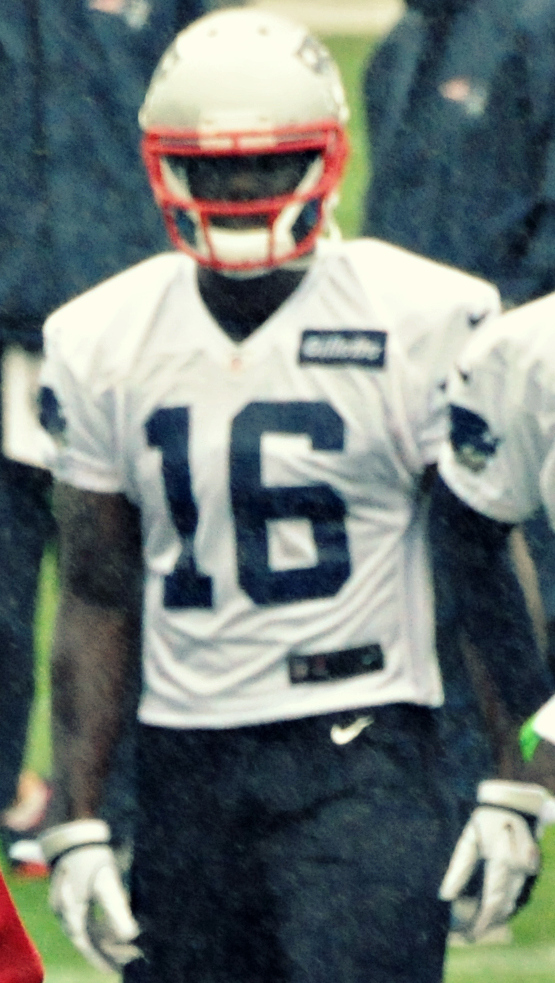
Aiken with the Patriots in 2013

On November 19, 2012, Aiken was signed to the New England Patriots' practice squad. On December 22, Aiken was to the active roster, but was released two days later and re-signed to the practice squad. On December 29, Aiken was promoted back to the Patriots' active roster. On August 26, 2013, he was released by the Patriots.

=== Baltimore Ravens ===
==== 2013 ====
On October 30, 2013, Aiken was signed to the Baltimore Ravens' practice squad.

==== 2014 ====
Aiken scored for the first time in his career in a Week 6 game on October 12, 2014, against the Tampa Bay Buccaneers, catching a 17-yard touchdown pass. He helped quarterback Joe Flacco set the NFL record for the fastest time to record five touchdown passes (16:03). The Ravens won in a 48–17 blowout, and Aiken contributed with two catches for 20 yards.

In Week 14, in a game versus the Miami Dolphins Aiken caught a 13-yard touchdown pass and was a key factor in a 28–13 win, taking over for wide receiver Torrey Smith, who was not targeted in the game at all. He caught six passes for 65 yards. In a press conference that followed the game, Aiken made a comment that was directed at Smith: "I got you, bro."

In Week 17, Aiken caught a 2-yard touchdown pass to seal a win over the division rival Cleveland Browns, and the Ravens clinched the AFC's final playoff spot. Aiken's final stats for the game would be two receptions for 13 yards.

In the Divisional Round of the playoffs, the Ravens took on the number-one seeded New England Patriots, one of Aiken's former teams. Aiken scored the game's opening touchdown off a 19-yard pass from Flacco, his only catch of the game, but the Ravens lost to the eventual Super Bowl XLIX champions in a 35–31 shootout and had their season ended.

Aiken finished the 2014 season with 24 receptions, 267 receiving yards, and three touchdowns.

==== 2015 ====
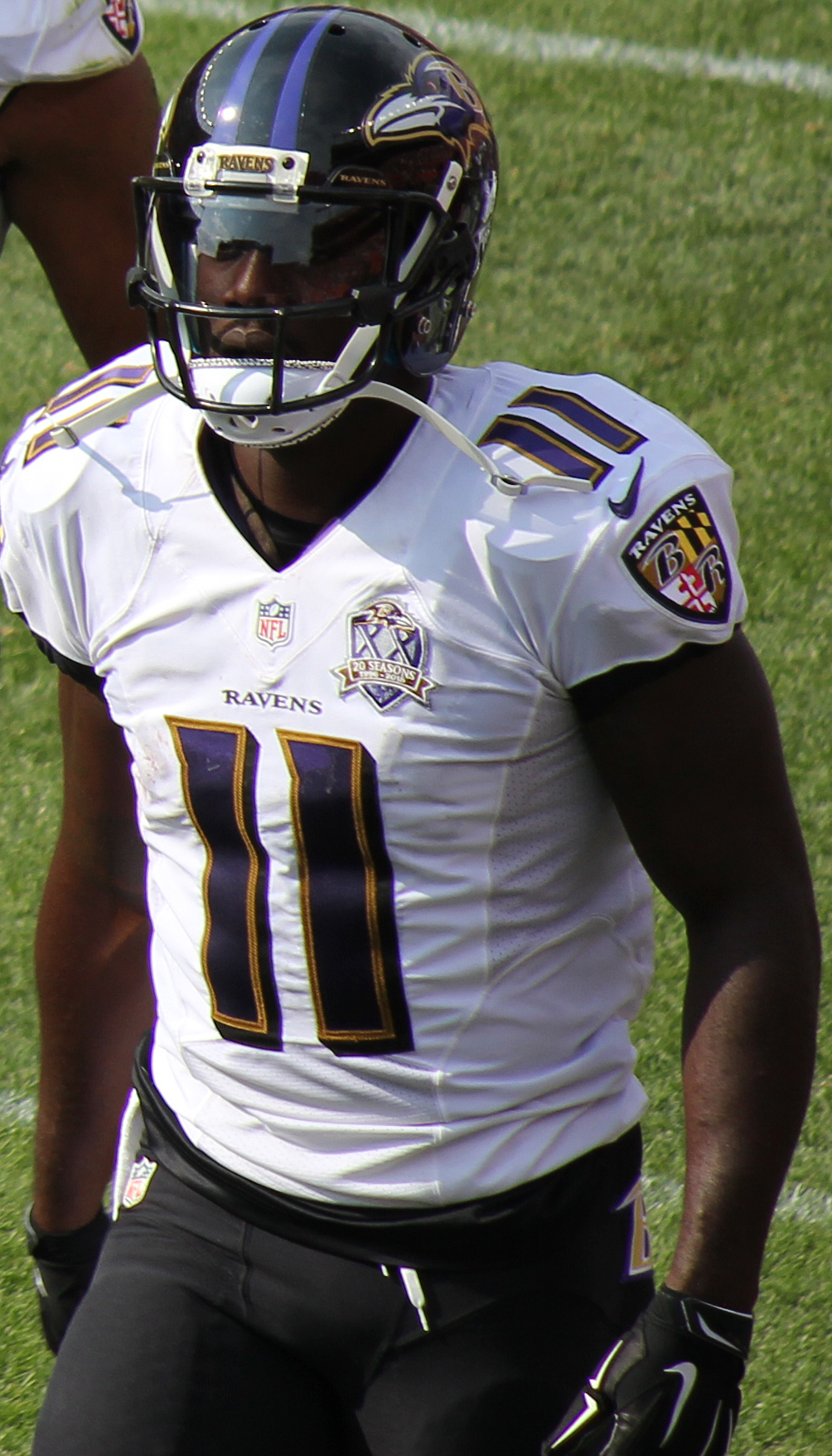
Aike with the Ravens in 2015

In his second year after the departure of Torrey Smith, Aiken was expected to compete for a starting spot. As a result of injuries to Steve Smith Sr., Breshad Perriman, Dennis Pitta, and Crockett Gillmore, he would end up being the Ravens' leading receiver during the year.

Aiken scored his first touchdown (a 15-yard reception) of the season in a Week 4 Thursday Night Football matchup with the division rival Pittsburgh Steelers. The Ravens would win the game 23–20 in overtime, giving them their first win of the season. Aiken was the game's leading receiver with 77 yards on five catches.

In Week 6, in a 25–20 loss to the San Francisco 49ers, Aiken had three catches for 22 yards and a two-yard touchdown, which he caught while diving backwards in the endzone.

In a Week 11 game against the St. Louis Rams, Aiken scored his team's only touchdown off a three-yard pass from Flacco (who would suffer a season-ending ACL injury towards the end of the game) in a 16–13 comeback win. Aiken would finish the game with five receptions for 50 yards.

The following week, in a Monday Night Football game against the Clevelabd Browns, Aiken would be a huge factor in a shootout game that came down to the wire, catching six passes for 80 yards and a 15-yard touchdown. On the final play of regulation, the Browns were in position for a game-winning field goal. Baltimore's Brent Urban would block a Travis Coons kick that would be recovered by Ravens' safety Will Hill and returned 64 yards for the game-winning touchdown.

In Week 15, the Ravens took on the Kansas City Chiefs. On the final play of the first half, the Ravens ran a Hail Mary play, due to their 17-point trailing deficit, in which quarterback Jimmy Clausen lofted a pass to Aiken, who caught the ball for a 48-yard touchdown and made the game 24–14 in favor of Kansas City heading into halftime. However, the Ravens would end up being shut out in the second half and suffer their second consecutive blowout loss by a score of 34–14. Aiken, however, was the game's leading receiver, with 8 receptions (the biggest one being the unexpected touchdown) for 128 yards.

Aiken would finish the season as one of the few bright spots of an otherwise disappointing 5–11 campaign. He had a breakout season, leading the Ravens in receptions (75), receiving yards (944) and receiving touchdowns (5), while also committing one fumble, which he lost.

==== 2016 ====
During the 2016 offseason, the Ravens placed their second-round tender on Aiken, keeping him around for the 2016 season. He played in all 16 games with six starts, recording 29 receptions for 328 yards and one touchdown.

=== Indianapolis Colts ===
On March 21, 2017, Aiken signed with the Indianapolis Colts. He played in 15 games (including seven starts) for Indianapolis, recording 15 receptions for 133 yards.

=== Philadelphia Eagles ===
On July 25, 2018, Aiken signed with the Philadelphia Eagles. He was released by the Eagles on September 1. On September 12, Philadelphia re-signed Aiken to the practice squad. He was released by the Eagles again on October 19.

== NFL statistics ==
Season	Team	Games		Receiving					Rushing					Fumbles	
Season	Team	GP	GS	Rec	Yds	Avg	Lng	TD	Att	Yds	Avg	Lng	TD	FUM	Lost
2011	BUF	2	0	0	0	0.0	0	0	0	0	0.0	0	0	0	0
2012	NWE	1	0	0	0	0.0	0	0	0	0	0.0	0	0	0	0
2013	NWE	0	0	0	0	0.0	0	0	0	0	0.0	0	0	0	0
2014	BAL	16	0	24	267	11.1	24	3	0	0	0	0	0	0	0
2015	BAL	16	14	75	944	12.6	48T	5	0	0	0	0	0	1	1
2016	BAL	16	6	29	328	11.3	29	1	0	0	0	0	0	0	0
2017	IND	15	7	15	133	8.9	21	0	0	0	0	0	0	0	0
2018	PHI	5	1	6	53	8.8	18	0	0	0	0	0	0	0	0
Career		71	28	149	1,725	11.6	48T	9	0	0	0	0	0	1	1
