= 2015 Baltimore Ravens season =

NFL team season

- Owner: Stephen Bisciotti
- General manager: Ozzie Newsome
- Head coach: John Harbaugh
- Offensive coordinator: Marc Trestman
- Defensive coordinator: Dean Pees
- Home stadium: M&T Bank Stadium

Results
- Record: 5–11
- Division place: 3rd AFC North
- Playoffs: Did not qualify
- Pro Bowlers: LS Morgan Cox; OLB Elvis Dumervil; P Sam Koch; G Marshal Yanda

Uniform
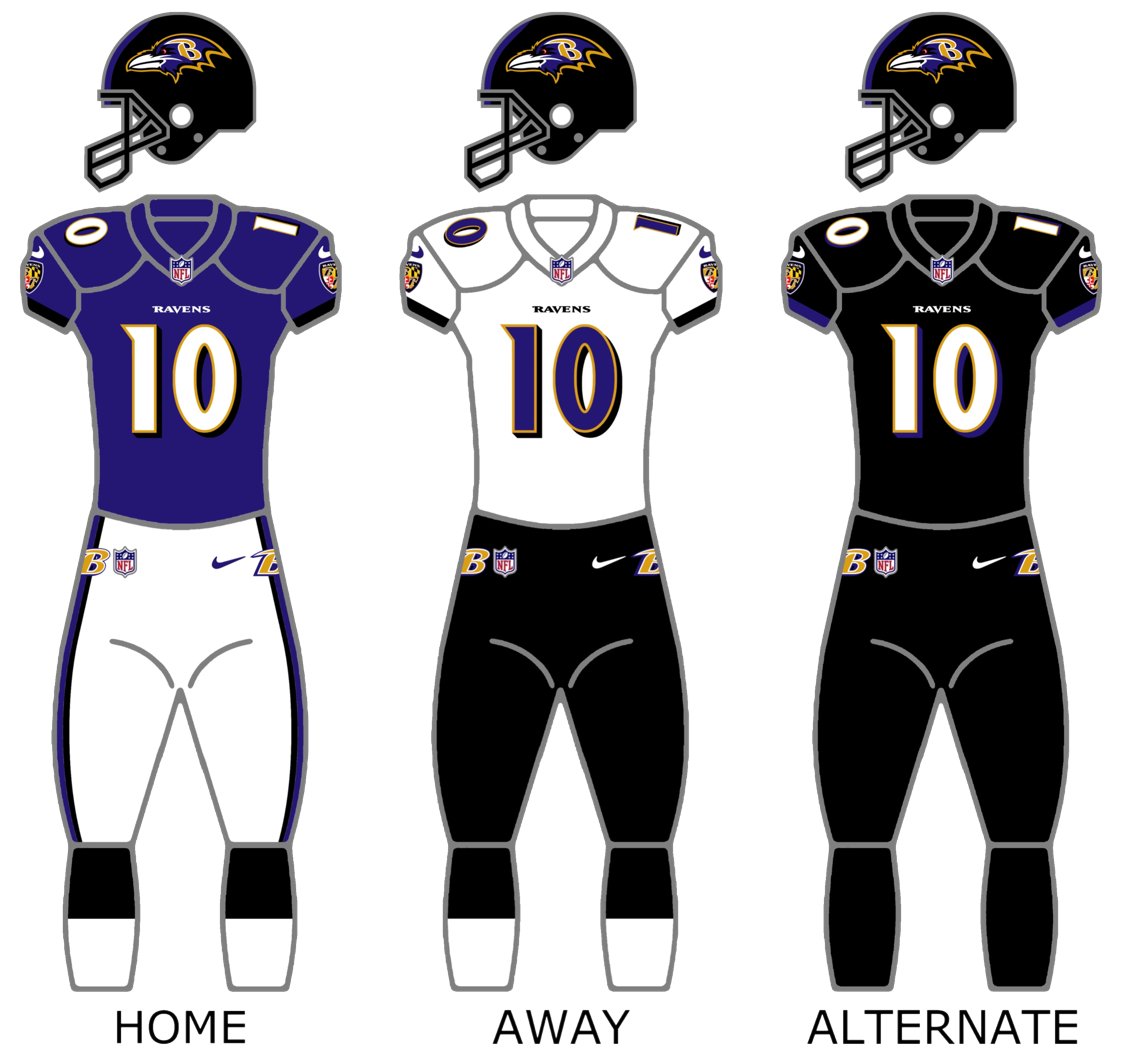

The 2015 season was the Baltimore Ravens' 20th in the National Football League (NFL) and their eighth under head coach John Harbaugh. Although picked by some, including Sports Illustrated's Peter King, to reach the Super Bowl, they had a disappointing season due to devastating injuries to team starters. 14 of their games were decided by 8 points or less and Joe Flacco, Justin Forsett, Steve Smith, Sr., and Terrell Suggs all suffered season ending injuries. They were eliminated from playoff contention in Week 14 with a loss to the Seattle Seahawks, in which they also suffered their ninth loss, resulting their first losing season in the Harbaugh era and first since the collapse of the Brian Billick era. Ultimately the Ravens finished with a 5–11 record and twenty-two players ended the season on Injured Reserve. The 5–11 record is their worst since the 2007 season. This was the Ravens' only losing season from 2008 to 2020. Despite the poor 2015 season, one of the few bright spots for the Ravens was when they swept the Pittsburgh Steelers, which prevented the Steelers from winning the AFC North.

The Ravens lost to the Falcons, 20–19, in a preseason game on September 3. This is notable because they would go on an NFL-record 24-game winning streak in the preseason afterwards.

== 2015 draft class ==
2015 Baltimore Ravens draft
Round	Pick	Player	Position	College	Notes
1	26	Breshad Perriman	WR	Central Florida	
2	55	Maxx Williams	TE	Minnesota	
3	90	Carl Davis	DT	Iowa	
4	122	Za'Darius Smith *	DE	Kentucky	
4	125	Javorius Allen	RB	USC	
4	136	Tray Walker	CB	Texas Southern	
5	171	Nick Boyle	TE	Delaware	
5	176	Robert Myers	G	Tennessee State	
6	204	Darren Waller *	WR	Georgia Tech	
Made roster † Pro Football Hall of Fame * Made at least one Pro Bowl during career

Notes

- The Ravens traded their original fifth-round selection (No. 162 overall) to the Tampa Bay Buccaneers in exchange for guard/center Jeremy Zuttah.
- The Ravens traded defensive tackle Haloti Ngata and their seventh-round selection (No. 231 overall – previously acquired in a 2013 trade that sent offensive tackle Bryant McKinnie to the Miami Dolphins) to the Detroit Lions in exchange for the Lions' fourth- and fifth-round selections (Nos. 122 and 158 overall, respectively).
- The Ravens traded their original sixth-round selection (No. 202 overall) to the Cleveland Browns in exchange for the Browns' 2014 seventh-round selection.
- The Ravens acquired an additional sixth-round selection (No. 204 overall) in a trade that sent their original seventh-round selection (No. 243 overall) and linebacker Rolando McClain to the Dallas Cowboys.
- The Ravens traded their second and fifth-round selection to acquire the No. 55 overall selection from the Arizona Cardinals.

== Staff ==
2015 Baltimore Ravens staff
Front office: Owner – Steve Bisciotti; President – Dick Cass; Executive vice president/general manager – Ozzie Newsome; Assistant general manager – Eric DeCosta; Senior vice president of football administration – Pat Moriarty; Director of pro personnel – Vince Newsome; Director of college scouting – Joe Hortiz; Senior personnel assistant – George Kokinis; Assistant director of pro personnel – Chad Alexander; Executive assistant/football information manager – Megan McLaughlin; Head coaches: Head coach – John Harbaugh; Assistant to the head coach – Dan Parsons; Offensive coaches: Offensive coordinator – Marc Trestman; Quarterbacks – Marty Mornhinweg; Running backs – Thomas Hammock; Wide receivers – Bobby Engram; Tight ends – Richard Angulo; Offensive line – Juan Castillo; Assistant offensive line – Todd Washington; Senior offensive assistant – Craig Ver Steeg; Offensive quality control – Andy Bischoff	Defensive coaches: Defensive coordinator – Dean Pees; Defensive line – Clarence Brooks; Linebackers – Ted Monachino; Inside linebackers – Don Martindale; Defensive backs – Chris Hewitt; Cornerbacks – Matt Weiss; Defensive assistant – Mike Macdonald; Defensive coaching assistant – Drew Wilkins; Staff Assistant (Defense) – John Egorugwu; Special teams coaches: Associate head coach/special teams coordinator – Jerry Rosburg; Kicking consultant – Randy Brown; Staff Assistant (Special Teams) – Chris Horton; Strength and conditioning: Strength and conditioning – Bob Rogucki; Assistant strength and conditioning – Juney Barnett; Cross-training specialist – Billy DeLorbe

== Final roster ==
2015 Baltimore Ravens roster
Quarterbacks (QB): 2 Jimmy Clausen; 7 Ryan Mallett; 8 Matt Schaub; Running backs (RB): 37 Javorius Allen; 44 Kyle Juszczyk FB; 30 Terrence Magee; 27 Terrance West; Wide receivers (WR): 11 Kamar Aiken; 17 Jeremy Butler; 81 Kaelin Clay; 13 Chris Givens; 84 Chris Matthews; Tight ends (TE): 83 Daniel Brown; 86 Konrad Reuland; 87 Maxx Williams	Offensive linemen (OL): 74 James Hurst T; 66 Ryan Jensen G; 72 Kelechi Osemele G; 64 John Urschel C; 71 Rick Wagner T; 77 De'Ondre Wesley T; 73 Marshal Yanda G; Defensive linemen (DL): 94 Carl Davis; 93 Lawrence Guy DE; 97 Timmy Jernigan DE; 95 Kapron Lewis-Moore DE; 96 Brent Urban DE; 98 Brandon Williams NT	Linebackers (LB): 59 Arthur Brown ILB; 56 Chris Carter OLB; 58 Elvis Dumervil OLB; 50 Albert McClellan ILB; 57 C. J. Mosley ILB; 54 Zach Orr ILB; 51 Daryl Smith ILB; 90 Za'Darius Smith OLB; 91 Courtney Upshaw OLB; Defensive backs (DB): 24 Kyle Arrington CB; 31 Terrence Brooks FS; 33 Will Hill SS; 41 Anthony Levine SS; 23 Kendrick Lewis S; 32 Sheldon Price CB; 38 Jumal Rolle CB; 22 Jimmy Smith CB; 28 Brynden Trawick FS; 25 Tray Walker CB; 21 Lardarius Webb FS; 40 Jermaine Whitehead FS; 35 Shareece Wright CB; Special teams (ST): 46 Morgan Cox LS; 4 Sam Koch P; 9 Justin Tucker K	Practice squad: 45 Brennen Beyer OLB (IR); 69 Leon Brown G; 42 Cap Capi OLB; 63 Blaine Clausell T; 43 Alonzo Harris RB; 68 Eric Herman G; 10 Chuck Jacobs WR; 78 Marcel Jones T; 36 Nick Perry FS; 49 Harold Spears TE; Reserve: 82 Nick Boyle TE (Susp.); 14 Marlon Brown WR (IR); 15 Michael Campanaro WR (IR); 99 Chris Canty DE (IR); 39 Will Davis CB (IR); 26 Matt Elam SS (IR); 5 Joe Flacco QB (IR); 48 Chase Ford TE (IR); 29 Justin Forsett RB (IR); 80 Crockett Gillmore TE (IR); 60 Eugene Monroe LT (IR); 18 Breshad Perriman WR (IR); 88 Dennis Pitta TE (PUP); 85 Allen Reisner TE (IR); 79 Micajah Reynolds NT (IR); 89 Steve Smith Sr. WR (IR); 55 Terrell Suggs OLB (IR); 34 Lorenzo Taliaferro RB (IR); 12 Darren Waller WR (IR); 47 Julian Wilson CB (IR); 81 Cam Worthy WR (IR); 53 Jeremy Zuttah C (IR); Rookies in italics 53 active, 24 reserve, 9 practice squad

== Preseason ==
=== Schedule ===
Week	Date	Opponent	Result	Record	Venue	Recap
1	August 13	New Orleans Saints	W 30–27	1–0	M&T Bank Stadium	Recap
2	August 22	at Philadelphia Eagles	L 17–40	1–1	Lincoln Financial Field	Recap
3	August 29	Washington Redskins	L 13–31	1–2	M&T Bank Stadium	Recap
4	September 3	at Atlanta Falcons	L 19–20	1–3	Georgia Dome	Recap

== Regular season ==
=== Schedule ===
Week	Date	Opponent	Result	Record	Venue	Recap
1	September 13	at Denver Broncos	**L** 13–19	0–1	Sports Authority Field at Mile High	Recap
2	September 20	at Oakland Raiders	**L** 33–37	0–2	O.co Coliseum	Recap
3	September 27	**Cincinnati Bengals**	**L** 24–28	0–3	M&T Bank Stadium	Recap
4	October 1	at **Pittsburgh Steelers**	**W** 23–20 (OT)	1–3	Heinz Field	Recap
5	October 11	**Cleveland Browns**	**L** 30–33 (OT)	1–4	M&T Bank Stadium	Recap
6	October 18	at San Francisco 49ers	**L** 20–25	1–5	Levi's Stadium	Recap
7	October 26	at Arizona Cardinals	**L** 18–26	1–6	University of Phoenix Stadium	Recap
8	November 1	San Diego Chargers	**W** 29–26	2–6	M&T Bank Stadium	Recap
9	Bye					
10	November 15	Jacksonville Jaguars	**L** 20–22	2–7	M&T Bank Stadium	Recap
11	November 22	St. Louis Rams	**W** 16–13	3–7	M&T Bank Stadium	Recap
12	November 30	at **Cleveland Browns**	**W** 33–27	4–7	FirstEnergy Stadium	Recap
13	December 6	at Miami Dolphins	**L** 13–15	4–8	Sun Life Stadium	Recap
14	December 13	Seattle Seahawks	**L** 6–35	4–9	M&T Bank Stadium	Recap
15	December 20	Kansas City Chiefs	**L** 14–34	4–10	M&T Bank Stadium	Recap
16	December 27	**Pittsburgh Steelers**	**W** 20–17	5–10	M&T Bank Stadium	Recap
17	January 3	at **Cincinnati Bengals**	**L** 16–24	5–11	Paul Brown Stadium	Recap

Note: Intra-division opponents are in bold text.

=== Game summaries ===
==== Week 1: Denver Broncos 19, Baltimore Ravens 13 ====
Week One: Baltimore Ravens at Denver Broncos – Game summary

Quarter	1	2	3	4	Total
Ravens	0	3	10	0	**13**
**Broncos**	6	3	7	3	**19**

at Sports Authority Field at Mile High, Denver, Colorado

- Date: September 13
- Game time: 4:25 p.m. EDT/2:25 p.m. MDT
- Game weather: 88 °F (31 °C), partly sunny
- Game attendance: 76,798
- Referee: Gene Steratore
- TV announcers (CBS): Jim Nantz, Phil Simms and Tracy Wolfson
- Recap, Gamebook

Game information

**First quarter**

- DEN – 5:16 B. McManus 57 yd. Field Goal (Drive: 15-48, 6:17) (DEN 3-0)
- DEN – 1:26 B. McManus 56 yd. Field Goal (Drive: 6-15, 2:09) (DEN 6-0)

**Second quarter**

- BAL – 6:42 J. Tucker 52 yd. Field Goal (Drive: 8-31, 4:14) (DEN 6-3)
- DEN – 0:09 B. McManus 43 yd. Field Goal (Drive: 7-30, 1:04) (DEN 9-3)

**Third quarter**

- BAL – 14:04 J. Smith 24 yd. interception return (J.Tucker kick) (BAL 10-9)
- BAL – 9:33 J. Tucker 44 yd. Field Goal (Drive: 8-35, 2:51) (BAL 13-9)
- DEN – 0:10 A. Talib 51 yd. interception return (B.McManus kick) (DEN 16-13)

**Fourth quarter**

- DEN – 2:55 B. McManus 33 yd. Field Goal (Drive: 17-81,10:56) (DEN 19-13)

**Top passers**

- BAL – Joe Flacco – 32–18–117–0–2
- DEN – Peyton Manning – 40–24–175–0–1

**Top rushers**

- BAL – Justin Forsett – 14–43–0
- DEN – Ronnie Hillman – 12–41–0

**Top receivers**

- BAL – Marlon Brown – 2–25–0
- DEN – Emmanuel Sanders – 8–65–0

**Top tacklers**

- BAL – Jimmy Smith – 8
- DEN – Brandon Marshall, Danny Trevathan – 6

The Ravens opened the season in Denver. Joe Flacco and the offense struggled through the entire game. Not only did the Ravens lose 19–13 and start the season 0–1, but they also lost Terrell Suggs to a torn achilles. It was later announced that Suggs would miss the entire 2015 season, jeopardizing the Ravens defense for the rest of the season.

==== Week 2: Oakland Raiders 37, Baltimore Ravens 33 ====
Week Two: Baltimore Ravens at Oakland Raiders – Game summary

Quarter	1	2	3	4	Total
Ravens	10	10	0	13	**33**
**Raiders**	10	10	10	7	**37**

at O.co Coliseum, Oakland, California

- Date: September 20
- Game time: 4:05 pm. EDT/1:05 p.m. PDT
- Game weather: 80 °F (27 °C), sunny
- Game attendance: 53,500
- Referee: Pete Morelli
- TV announcers (CBS): Spero Dedes and Solomon Wilcots
- Recap, Gamebook

Game information

**First quarter**

- OAK – 12:49 A. Cooper 68 yd. pass from D.Carr (S.Janikowski kick) (Drive: 6-80, 2:11) (OAK 7-0)
- OAK – 11:44 S. Janikowski 23 yd. Field Goal (Drive: 4-24, 0:58) (OAK 10-0)
- BAL – 7:41 J. Tucker 22 yd. Field Goal (Drive: 10-66, 4:03) (OAK 10-3)
- BAL – 0:00 C. Gillmore 26 yd. pass from J.Flacco (J.Tucker kick) (Drive: 6-80, 2:59) (Tied 10-10)

**Second quarter**

- OAK – 12:52 L. Murray 1 yd. run (S.Janikowski kick) (Drive: 5-80, 2:08) (OAK 17-10)
- BAL – 7:44 C. Gillmore 9 yd. pass from J.Flacco (J.Tucker kick) (Drive: 9-80, 5:08) (Tied 17-17)
- OAK – 2:00 S. Janikowski 46 yd. Field Goal (Drive: 10-52, 5:44) (OAK 20-17)
- BAL – 0:00 J. Tucker 21 yd. Field Goal (Drive: 10-77, 2:00) (Tied 20-20)

**Third quarter**

- OAK – 8:44 S. Janikowski 48 yd. Field Goal (Drive: 10-45, 4:11) (OAK 23-20)
- OAK – 2:12 M. Crabtree 29 yd. pass from D.Carr (S.Janikowski kick) (Drive: 9-84, 4:24) (OAK 30-20)

**Fourth quarter**

- BAL – 13:37 J. Tucker 37 yd. Field Goal (Drive: 10-61, 3:35) (OAK 30-23)
- BAL – 7:03 L. Taliaferro 7 yd. run (J.Tucker kick) (Drive: 11-93, 5:30) (Tied 30-30)
- BAL – 2:10 J. Tucker 31 yd. Field Goal (Drive: 8-24, 2:44) (BAL 33-30)
- OAK – 0:26 S. Roberts 12 yd. pass from D.Carr (S.Janikowski kick) (Drive: 9-80, 1:44) (OAK 37-33)

**Top passers**

- BAL – Joe Flacco – 45–32–384–2–1
- OAK – Derek Carr – 46–30–351–3–1

**Top rushers**

- BAL – Justin Forsett – 15–68–0
- OAK – Latavius Murray – 15–65–1

**Top receivers**

- BAL – Steve Smith – 10–150–0
- OAK – Michael Crabtree – 9–111–1

**Top tacklers**

- BAL – C. J. Mosley – 8
- OAK – Curtis Lofton, Malcolm Smith – 7

With the tough loss, the Ravens dropped to 0–2, the first such start to a season since 2005. The team also dropped to 7–2 all-time against the Raiders. With wins by both the Steelers and the Browns, the Ravens remain in the AFC North basement.

==== Week 3: Cincinnati Bengals 28, Baltimore Ravens 24 ====
Week Three: Cincinnati Bengals at Baltimore Ravens – Game summary

Quarter	1	2	3	4	Total
**Bengals**	7	7	0	14	**28**
Ravens	0	0	7	17	**24**

at M&T Bank Stadium, Baltimore, Maryland

- Date: September 27
- Game time: 1:02 pm. EDT
- Game weather: 70 °F (21 °C), cloudy
- Game attendance: 70,970
- Referee: Walt Anderson
- TV announcers (CBS): Andrew Catalon, Steve Beuerlein and Steve Tasker
- Recap, Gamebook

Game information

**First quarter**

- CIN – 7:20 A. Dalton 7 yd. run (M.Nugent kick) (Drive: 10-67, 5:25) (CIN 7-0)

**Second quarter**

- CIN – 12:18 M. Jones 16 yd. pass from A.Dalton (M.Nugent kick) (Drive: 3-30, 0:19) (CIN 14-0)

**Third quarter**

- BAL – 6:23 S. Smith 50 yd. pass from J.Flacco (J.Tucker kick) (Drive: 7-80, 4:20) (CIN 14-7)

**Fourth quarter**

- BAL – 13:27 J. Tucker 21 yd. Field Goal (Drive: 12-62, 5:58) (CIN 14-10)
- BAL – 6:49 C. Mosley 41 yd. fumble return (J.Tucker kick) (BAL 17-14)
- CIN – 6:37 A. Green 80 yd. pass from A.Dalton (M.Nugent kick) (Drive: 1-80, 0:12) (CIN 21-17)
- BAL – 3:56 S. Smith 16 yd. pass from J.Flacco (J.Tucker kick) (Drive: 9-79, 2:41) (BAL 24-21)
- CIN – 2:10 A. Green 7 yd. pass from A.Dalton (M.Nugent kick) (Drive: 6-80, 1:46) (CIN 28-24)

**Top passers**

- CIN – Andy Dalton – 32–20–383–3–1
- BAL – Joe Flacco – 49–32–362–2–1

**Top rushers**

- CIN – Giovani Bernard – 13–49–0
- BAL – Justin Forsett – 10–13–0

**Top receivers**

- CIN – A. J. Green – 10–227–2
- BAL – Steve Smith, Sr. – 13–186–2

**Top tacklers**

- CIN – A. J. Hawk – 5
- BAL – Will Hill, Brandon Williams, C. J. Mosley – 4

With their fourth straight loss to the Bengals, the Ravens dropped to 0–3 and started the season with such a record for the first time in franchise history.

==== Week 4: Baltimore Ravens 23, Pittsburgh Steelers 20 (OT) ====
Week Four: Baltimore Ravens at Pittsburgh Steelers – Game summary

Quarter	1	2	3	4	OT	Total
**Ravens**	7	0	7	6	3	**23**
Steelers	3	10	7	0	0	**20**

at Heinz Field, Pittsburgh, Pennsylvania

- Date: October 1
- Game time: 8:26 pm. EDT
- Game weather: 63 °F (17 °C), cloudy
- Game attendance: 63,929
- Referee: Clete Blakeman
- TV announcers (CBS/NFLN): Jim Nantz, Phil Simms and Tracy Wolfson
- Recap, Gamebook

Game information

**First quarter**

- PIT – 7:41 J. Scobee 45 yd. Field Goal (Drive: 8-52, 4:59) (PIT 3-0)
- BAL – 0:25 M. Campanaro 9 yd. run (J.Tucker kick) (Drive: 12-75, 7:16) (BAL 7-3)

**Second quarter**

- PIT – 1:37 L. Bell 11 yd. run (J.Scobee kick) (Drive: 8-67, 3:09) (PIT 10-7)
- PIT – 0:00 J. Scobee 36 yd. Field Goal (Drive: 5-27, 0:39) (PIT 13-7)

**Third quarter**

- PIT – 10:41 D. Heyward-Bey 9 yd. pass from M.Vick (J.Scobee kick) (Drive: 6-26, 4:08) (PIT 20-7)
- BAL – 7:27 K. Aiken 15 yd. pass from J.Flacco (J.Tucker kick) (Drive: 6-80, 3:14) (PIT 20-14)

**Fourth quarter**

- BAL – 10:14 J. Tucker 40 yd. Field Goal (Drive: 12-38, 6:58) (PIT 20-17)
- BAL – 0:03 J. Tucker 42 yd. Field Goal (Drive: 7-45, 0:58) (Tied 20-20)

**Overtime**

- BAL – 5:08 J. Tucker 52 yd. Field Goal (Drive: 8-32, 4:33) (BAL 23-20)

**Top passers**

- BAL – Joe Flacco – 33–20–189–1–1
- PIT – Michael Vick – 26–19–124–1–0

**Top rushers**

- BAL – Justin Forsett – 27–150–0
- PIT – Le'Veon Bell – 22–129–1

**Top receivers**

- BAL – Kamar Aiken – 5–77–1
- PIT – Antonio Brown – 5–42–0

**Top tacklers**

- BAL – Daryl Smith – 10
- PIT – Lawrence Timmons, Stephon Tuitt – 10

The Ravens finally produced a win against their archrival the Steelers to improve to 1–3. With the Browns' loss to the Chargers on Sunday, both teams remain in last place in the division.

==== Week 5: Cleveland Browns 33, Baltimore Ravens 30 (OT) ====
Week Five: Cleveland Browns at Baltimore Ravens – Game summary

Quarter	1	2	3	4	OT	Total
**Browns**	3	6	7	14	3	**33**
Ravens	14	0	7	9	0	**30**

at M&T Bank Stadium, Baltimore, Maryland

- Date: October 11
- Game time: 1:02 pm. EDT
- Game weather: 65 °F (18 °C), mostly sunny
- Game attendance: 71,046
- Referee: Jeff Triplette
- TV announcers (CBS): Kevin Harlan, Rich Gannon and Dana Jacobson
- Recap, Gamebook

Game information

**First quarter**

- BAL – Joe Flacco 1-yard run (Justin Tucker kick), 8:35. Ravens 7–0. **Drive: 8 plays, 61 yards, 3:14.**
- CLE – Travis Coons 43-yard field goal, 3:16. Ravens 7–3. **Drive: 10 plays, 55 yards, 5:19.**
- BAL – Kyle Juszczyk 8-yard pass from Joe Flacco (Justin Tucker kick), 0:23. Ravens 14–3. **Drive: 6 plays, 73 yards, 2:55.**

**Second quarter**

- CLE – Travis Coons 43-yard field goal, 4:09. Ravens 14–6. **Drive: 6 plays, 36 yards, 2:42.**
- CLE – Travis Coons 37-yard field goal, 0:02. Ravens 14–9. **Drive: 7 plays, 40 yards, 1:03.**

**Third quarter**

- BAL – Joe Flacco 1-yard run (Justin Tucker kick), 7:50. Ravens 21–9. **Drive: 9 plays, 90 yards, 4:26.**
- CLE – Josh McCown 10-yard run (Travis Coons kick), 1:14. Ravens 21–16. **Drive: 13 plays, 75 yards, 6:41.**

**Fourth quarter**

- CLE – Gary Barnidge 18-yard pass from Josh McCown (pass failed), 12:29. Browns 22–21. **Drive: 4 plays, 79 yards, 1:42.**
- BAL – Justin Forsett 1-yard run (pass failed), 6:00. Ravens 27–22. **Drive: 7 plays, 43 yards, 2:50.**
- CLE – Isaiah Crowell 22-yard pass from Josh McCown (Josh McCown-Andrew Hawkins pass), 3:15. Browns 30–27. **Drive: 6 plays, 80 yards, 2:53.**
- BAL – Justin Tucker 23-yard field goal, 0:29. Tied 30–30. **Drive: 11 plays, 75 yards, 2:38.**

**Overtime**

- CLE – Travis Coons 32-yard field goal, 6:48. Browns 33–30. **Drive: 12 plays, 51 yards, 7:11.**

**Top passers**

- CLE – Josh McCown – 36/51, 457 yards, 2 TD
- BAL – Joe Flacco – 19/35, 210 yards, TD

**Top rushers**

- CLE – Isaiah Crowell – 13 rushes, 49 yards
- BAL – Justin Forsett – 21 rushes, 121 yards, TD

**Top receivers**

- CLE – Gary Barnidge – 8 receptions, 139 yards, TD
- BAL – Kamar Aiken – 4 receptions, 78 yards

**Top tacklers**

- CLE – Karlos Dansby – 3 tackles, 7 assists
- BAL – Daryl Smith – 7 tackles, 5 assists

The Ravens couldn't use the momentum from the Pittsburgh win to beat their division rival the Browns, losing in overtime 33–30, dropping to 1–4 for the first time in franchise history. They fell back to solo last place in the division and also lost their first game to the Browns at home since 2007. Harbaugh and Flacco's records dropped to 13–2 against the Browns as well.

==== Week 6: San Francisco 49ers 25, Baltimore Ravens 20 ====
Week Six: Baltimore Ravens at San Francisco 49ers – Game summary

Quarter	1	2	3	4	Total
Ravens	0	6	7	7	**20**
**49ers**	6	10	3	6	**25**

at Levi's Stadium, Santa Clara, California

- Date: October 18
- Game time: 4:25 pm. EDT/1:25 pm. PDT
- Game weather: 69 °F (21 °C), partly sunny
- Game attendance: 70,799
- Referee: John Parry
- TV announcers (CBS): Kevin Harlan, Rich Gannon and Jamie Erdahl
- Recap, Gamebook

Game information

**First quarter**

- SF – 7:00 P. Dawson 53 yd. Field Goal (Drive: 5-32, 1:37) (SF 3-0)
- SF – 1:56 P. Dawson 31 yd. Field Goal (Drive: 8-74, 3:30) (SF 6-0)

**Second quarter**

- BAL – 13:16 J. Tucker 22 yd. Field Goal (Drive: 9-57, 3:40) (SF 6-3)
- SF – 12:27 T. Smith 76 yd. pass from C.Kaepernick (P.Dawson kick) (Drive: 2-80, 0:49) (SF 13-3)
- SF – 8:04 P. Dawson 26 yd. Field Goal (Drive: 7-21, 3:31) (SF 16-3)
- BAL – 4:14 J. Tucker 36 yd. Field Goal (Drive: 9-62, 3:50) (SF 16-6)

**Third quarter**

- SF – 7:34 P. Dawson 42 yd. Field Goal (Drive: 7-14, 3:02) (SF 19-6)
- BAL – 2:29 S. Smith 34 yd. pass from J.Flacco (J.Tucker kick) (Drive: 9-80, 5:05) (SF 19-13)

**Fourth quarter**

- SF – 10:52 Q. Patton 21 yd. pass from C.Kaepernick (pass failed) (Drive: 5-65, 2:45) (SF 25-13)
- BAL – 5:14 K. Aiken 2 yd. pass from J.Flacco (J.Tucker kick) (Drive: 14-80, 5:38) (SF 25-20)

**Top passers**

- BAL – Joe Flacco – 53–33–343–2–2
- SF – Colin Kaepernick – 27–16–340–2–0

**Top rushers**

- BAL – Justin Forsett – 17–62–0
- SF – Carlos Hyde – 21–55–0

**Top receivers**

- BAL – Steve Smith, Sr. – 7–137–1
- SF – Anquan Boldin – 5–102–0

**Top tacklers**

- BAL – C. J. Mosley, Daryl Smith – 6
- SF – NaVorro Bowman – 13

In a rematch of Super Bowl XLVII, the Ravens' defense was unable to keep up with San Francisco quarterback Colin Kaepernick and their former teammates Anquan Boldin and Torrey Smith.

==== Week 7: Arizona Cardinals 26, Baltimore Ravens 18 ====
Week Seven: Baltimore Ravens at Arizona Cardinals – Game summary

Quarter	1	2	3	4	Total
Ravens	3	7	0	8	**18**
**Cardinals**	7	7	6	6	**26**

at University of Phoenix Stadium, Glendale, Arizona

- Date: October 26
- Game time: 8:30 pm. EDT/ 5:30 p.m. MST
- Game weather: Played indoors (retractable roof closed)
- Game attendance: 64,722
- Referee: Ron Torbert
- TV announcers (ESPN): Mike Tirico, Jon Gruden and Lisa Salters
- Recap, Gamebook

Game information

**First quarter**

- BAL – 5:25 J. Tucker 44 yd. Field Goal (Drive: 8-29, 5:27) (BAL 3-0)
- ARI – 3:59 C. Johnson 26 yd. run (C.Catanzaro kick) (Drive: 3-80, 1:26) (ARI 7-3)

**Second quarter**

- BAL – 3:54 J. Forsett 14 yd. run (J.Tucker kick) (Drive: 8-84, 4:45) (BAL 10-7)
- ARI – 1:01 M. Floyd 3 yd. pass from C.Palmer (C.Catanzaro kick) (Drive: 5-12, 1:47) (ARI 14-10)

**Third quarter**

- ARI – 9:47 C. Catanzaro 21 yd. Field Goal (Drive: 7-46, 3:07) (ARI 17-10)
- ARI – 2:27 C. Catanzaro 21 yd. Field Goal (Drive: 8-84, 3:58) (ARI 20-10)

**Fourth quarter**

- ARI – 8:08 J.O. Brown 4 yd. pass from C.Palmer (kick failed, hru) (Drive: 11-79, 6:08) (ARI 26-10)
- BAL – 4:26 K. Juszczyk 1 yd. pass from J.Flacco (J.Flacco-N.Boyle pass) (Drive: 1-1, 0:05) (ARI 26-18)

**Top passers**

- BAL – Joe Flacco – 40–26–252–1–1
- ARI – Carson Palmer – 29–20–275–2–0

**Top rushers**

- BAL – Justin Forsett – 12–36–1
- ARI – Chris Johnson – 18–122–1

**Top receivers**

- BAL – Steve Smith, Sr. – 5–78–0
- ARI – John Brown – 4–65–1

**Top tacklers**

- BAL – Daryl Smith – 8
- ARI – Deone Bucannon, Tyrann Mathieu, Rashad Johnson – 7

The Ravens, hoping to stop a five-game losing streak, travel to Arizona to take on the Cardinals. The defense struggled to contain the Cardinals explosive receiving corps. Late in the fourth quarter, Joe Flacco attempted to mount a comeback, but an interception in the end zone by the Cardinals sealed the loss. With the loss, the Ravens go to 1–6, tied for the worst record in the league with the Detroit Lions.

==== Week 8: Baltimore Ravens 29, San Diego Chargers 26 ====
Week Eight: San Diego Chargers at Baltimore Ravens – Game summary

Quarter	1	2	3	4	Total
Chargers	3	13	7	3	**26**
**Ravens**	6	7	6	10	**29**

at M&T Bank Stadium, Baltimore, Maryland

- Date: November 1
- Game time: 1:02 pm. EST
- Game weather: 63 °F (17 °C), mostly cloudy
- Game attendance: 70,829
- Referee: Gene Steratore
- TV announcers (CBS): Greg Gumbel, Trent Green and Jamie Erdahl
- Recap, Gamebook

Game information

**First quarter**

- BAL – 9:54 J. Tucker 48 yd. Field Goal (Drive: 8-31, 3:15) (BAL 3-0)
- SD – 5:44 J. Lambo 42 yd. Field Goal (Drive: 9-56, 4:10) (Tied 3-3)
- BAL – 2:36 J. Tucker 29 yd. Field Goal (Drive: 8-70, 3:08) (BAL 6-3)

**Second quarter**

- SD – 10:16 M. Floyd 9 yd. pass from P.Rivers (J.Lambo kick) (Drive: 13-80, 7:20) (SD 10-6)
- BAL – 4:54 C. Gillmore 3 yd. pass from J.Flacco (J.Tucker kick) (Drive: 11-80, 5:22) (BAL 13-10)
- SD – 0:09 K. Allen 13 yd. pass from P.Rivers (kick blocked) (Drive: 14-80, 4:45) (SD 16-13)

**Third quarter**

- BAL – 11:11 J. Tucker 48 yd. Field Goal (Drive: 6-45, 3:49) (Tied 16-16)
- SD – 2:54 M. Floyd 70 yd. pass from P.Rivers (J.Lambo kick) (Drive: 3-70, 0:24) (SD 23-16)
- BAL – 0:00 J. Tucker 45 yd. Field Goal (Drive: 10-53, 2:54) (SD 23-19)

**Fourth quarter**

- BAL – 4:34 J. Flacco 1 yd. run (J.Tucker kick) (Drive: 6-38, 2:56) (BAL 26-23)
- SD – 2:27 J. Lambo 49 yd. Field Goal (Drive: 8-49, 2:07) (Tied 26-26)
- BAL – 0:00 J. Tucker 39 yd. Field Goal (Drive: 9-59, 2:27) (BAL 29-26)

**Top passers**

- SD – Philip Rivers – 28–37–301–3–0
- BAL – Joe Flacco – 25–37–319–1–0

**Top rushers**

- SD – Melvin Gordon – 18–54–0
- BAL – Justin Forsett – 17–69–0

**Top receivers**

- SD – Malcom Floyd – 4–92–2
- BAL – Steve Smith, Sr. – 5–82–0

**Top tacklers**

- SD – Jason Verrett – 5
- BAL – Daryl Smith – 7

The Ravens were finally able to win a back and forth game, despite a poor showing from the defense, on a game-winning field goal from Justin Tucker. They improved to 2–6, but are still in last place in the AFC North because of their week 5 loss to the Browns.

Already missing Terrell Suggs for the season, the Ravens suffered another setback and this time Steve Smith, Sr. left the game with a ruptured Achilles tendon. The Ravens later announced that the injury will keep him out for the rest of the season.

==== Week 9: Bye Week ====
No game. Baltimore had a bye week.

==== Week 10: Jacksonville Jaguars 22, Baltimore Ravens 20 ====
Week Ten: Jacksonville Jaguars at Baltimore Ravens – Game summary

Quarter	1	2	3	4	Total
**Jaguars**	7	3	3	9	**22**
Ravens	0	14	0	6	**20**

at M&T Bank Stadium, Baltimore, Maryland

- Date: November 15
- Game time: 1:05 pm. EST
- Game weather: 60 °F (16 °C), partly cloudy
- Game attendance: 70,837
- Referee: Pete Morelli
- TV announcers (CBS): Spero Dedes, Solomon Wilcots and Chris Fischer
- Recap, Gamebook

Game information

**First quarter**

- JAC – 2:29 A. Hurns 5 yd. pass from B.Bortles (J.Myers kick) (Drive: 8-65, 4:27) (JAC 7-0)

**Second quarter**

- BAL – 11:32 C. Gillmore 10 yd. pass from J.Flacco (J.Tucker kick) (Drive: 2-26, 0:45) (Tied 7-7)
- JAC – 3:28 J. Myers 21 yd. Field Goal (Drive: 15-77, 8:04) (JAC 10-7)
- BAL – 1:11 M. Williams 21 yd. pass from J.Flacco (J.Tucker kick) (Drive: 7-80, 2:17) (BAL 14-10)

**Third quarter**

- JAC – 14:27 J. Myers 45 yd. Field Goal (Drive: 4-0, 0:24) (BAL 14-13)

**Fourth quarter**

- JAC – 13:01 A. Robinson 15 yd. pass from B.Bortles (pass failed) (Drive: 5-37, 1:00) (JAC 19-14)
- BAL – 7:30 C. Givens 14 yd. pass from J.Flacco (pass failed) (Drive: 10-80, 5:31) (BAL 20-19)
- JAC – 0:00 J. Myers 53 yd. Field Goal (Drive: 7-45, 1:06) (JAC 22-20)

**Top passers**

- JAX – Blake Bortles – 22–45–188–2–1
- BAL – Joe Flacco – 34–45–316–3–2

**Top rushers**

- JAX – T. J. Yeldon – 18–61–0
- BAL – Justin Forsett – 14–53–0

**Top receivers**

- JAX – Allen Hurns – 5–62–1
- BAL – Kamar Aiken – 7–73–0

**Top tacklers**

- JAX – Paul Posluszny – 6
- BAL – C. J. Mosley – 7

The Ravens were on the cusp of victory despite giving up the ball on three consecutive drives by two Joe Flacco interceptions and a Flacco lost fumble. However, on the last play of the game Elvis Dumervil sacked Jaguars quarterback Blake Bortles by grabbing onto his face mask, putting them into field goal range with one more play, which kicker Jason Myers converted to win the game, sending the Ravens to 2–7. It was later revealed that in fact, the Jaguars had not set before the aforementioned play, in which case they would have been penalized for a false start, and the ensuing ten-second runoff would have ended the game with the Ravens winning 20–19.

==== Week 11: Baltimore Ravens 16, St. Louis Rams 13 ====
Week Eleven: St. Louis Rams at Baltimore Ravens – Game summary

Quarter	1	2	3	4	Total
Rams	7	0	6	0	**13**
**Ravens**	0	3	0	13	**16**

at M&T Bank Stadium, Baltimore, Maryland

- Date: November 22
- Game time: 1:02 pm. EST
- Game weather: 47 °F (8 °C), partly cloudy
- Game attendance: 71,105
- Referee: Tony Corrente
- TV announcers (Fox): Kenny Albert, Daryl Johnston and Laura Okmin
- Recap, Gamebook

Game information

**First quarter**

- STL – 2:05 T. Gurley 1 yd. run (G.Zuerlein kick) (Drive: 3-59, 1:40) (STL 7-0)

**Second quarter**

- BAL – 0:00 J. Tucker 25 yd. Field Goal (Drive: 7-24, 3:53) (STL 7-3)

**Third quarter**

- STL – 6:14 L. Kendricks 30 yd. pass from C.Keenum (kick blocked) (Drive: 3-49, 1:21) (STL 13-3)

**Fourth quarter**

- BAL – 11:11 K. Aiken 3 yd. pass from J.Flacco (J.Tucker kick) (Drive: 7-42, 3:14) (STL 13-10)
- BAL – 5:12 J. Tucker 20 yd. Field Goal (Drive: 7-76, 3:49) (Tied 13-13)
- BAL – 0:00 J. Tucker 47 yd. Field Goal (Drive: 5-12, 0:54) (BAL 16-13)

**Top passers**

- STL – Case Keenum – 12–26–136–1–0
- BAL – Joe Flacco – 27–44–299–1–2

**Top rushers**

- STL – Todd Gurley – 25–66–1
- BAL – Javorius Allen – 22–67–0

**Top receivers**

- STL – Lance Kendricks – 2–43–1
- BAL – Crockett Gillmore – 5–101–0

**Top tacklers**

- STL – Mark Barron – 7
- BAL – C. J. Mosley – 7

In another close game, the Ravens finally pulled together a win, despite another 2 missed field goals by Justin Tucker, on a game winning try from 41 yards. All three Ravens wins have now come from game ending scores by Tucker. Late in the first quarter, running back Justin Forsett broke his right arm, ending his season. On the final drive of the game, Flacco suffered a season ending knee injury.

==== Week 12: Baltimore Ravens 33, Cleveland Browns 27 ====
Week Twelve: Baltimore Ravens at Cleveland Browns – Game summary

Quarter	1	2	3	4	Total
**Ravens**	10	7	7	9	**33**
Browns	0	13	7	7	**27**

at FirstEnergy Stadium, Cleveland, Ohio

- Date: November 30
- Game time: 8:30 pm. EST
- Game weather: 45 °F (7 °C), clear
- Game attendance: 64,380
- Referee: Brad Allen
- TV announcers (ESPN): Mike Tirico, Jon Gruden and Lisa Salters
- Recap, Gamebook

Game information

**First quarter**

- BAL – Kaelin Clay 82-yard punt return (Justin Tucker kick), 10:12. Ravens 7–0.
- BAL – Justin Tucker 49-yard field goal, 4:26. Ravens 10–0. **Drive: 7 plays, 39 yards, 3:11.**

**Second quarter**

- CLE – Travis Coons 31-yard field goal, 11:30. Ravens 10–3. **Drive: 14 plays, 67 yards, 7:55.**
- BAL – Javorius Allen 13-yard pass from Matt Schaub (Justin Tucker kick), 10:05. Ravens 17–3. **Drive: 3 plays, 60 yards, 1:29.**
- CLE – Marlon Moore 10-yard pass from Josh McCown (Travis Coons kick), 4:46. Ravens 17–10. **Drive: 9 plays, 69 yards, 5:22.**
- CLE – Travis Coons 21-yard field goal, 0:05. Ravens 17–13. **Drive: 9 plays, 58 yards, 2:35.**

**Third quarter**

- CLE – Karlos Dansby 52-yard interception return (Travis Coons kick), 12:27. Browns 20–17.
- BAL – Kamar Aiken 15-yard pass from Matt Schaub (Justin Tucker kick), 5:37. Ravens 24–20. **Drive: 12 plays, 80 yards, 6:46.**

**Fourth quarter**

- BAL – Justin Tucker 35-yard field goal, 9:09. Ravens 27–20. **Drive: 17 plays, 82 yards, 8:07.**
- CLE – Travis Benjamin 42-yard pass from Austin Davis (Travis Coons kick), 1:55. Tied 27–27. **Drive: 6 plays, 71 yards, 2:33.**
- BAL – Will Hill 64-yard blocked field goal return (run failed), 0:00. Ravens 33–27.

**Top passers**

- BAL – Matt Schaub – 20/34, 232 yards, 2 TD, 2 INT
- CLE – Josh McCown – 21/38, 212 yards, TD

**Top rushers**

- BAL – Javorius Allen – 12 rushes, 55 yards
- CLE – Duke Johnson – 7 rushes, 27 yards

**Top receivers**

- BAL – Kamar Aiken – 6 receptions, 80 yards, TD
- CLE – Gary Barnidge – 7 receptions, 91 yards

**Top tacklers**

- BAL – Lardarius Webb – 7 tackles
- CLE – Donte Whitner, Tashaun Gipson – 6 tackles each

In another wild game, the Ravens' second string offense, forced into starting roles due to mounting injuries, managed a win against the Browns, avoiding a season sweep which hasn't happened since 2007. The game was won on the last play of regulation, when defensive end Brent Urban blocked a Travis Coons 51-yard field goal attempt, which safety Will Hill returned 64 yards for a touchdown.

==== Week 13: Miami Dolphins 15, Baltimore Ravens 13 ====
Week Thirteen: Baltimore Ravens at Miami Dolphins – Game summary

Quarter	1	2	3	4	Total
Ravens	0	3	7	3	**13**
**Dolphins**	0	15	0	0	**15**

at Sun Life Stadium, Miami Gardens, Florida

- Date: December 6
- Game time: 1:03 pm. EST
- Game weather: 80 °F (26.7 °C), cloudy
- Game attendance: 64,519
- Referee: John Parry
- TV announcers (CBS): Andrew Catalon, Steve Beuerlein, Steve Tasker, and John Schriffen
- Recap, Gamebook

Game information

**First quarter**

- None

**Second quarter**

- MIA – 1:47 D. Parker 38 yd. pass from R. Tannehill (A. Franks kick) (Drive: 1-38, 0:07) (MIA 7-0)
- MIA – 1:27 D. Shelby 22 yd. interception return (J. Ajayi run) (MIA 15-0)
- BAL – 0:29 J. Tucker 38 yd. Field Goal (Drive: 7-60, 0:58) (MIA 15-3)

**Third quarter**

- BAL – 11:44 J. Allen 41 yd. pass from M. Schaub (J. Tucker kick) (Drive: 6-78, 3:16) (MIA 15-10)

**Fourth quarter**

- BAL – 10:17 J. Tucker 31 yd. Field Goal (Drive: 10-47, 5:28) (MIA 15-13)

**Top passers**

- BAL – Matt Schaub – 32–46–308–1–2
- MIA – Ryan Tannehill – 9–19–86–1–0

**Top rushers**

- BAL – Javorius Allen – 17–63–0
- MIA – Lamar Miller – 20–113–0

**Top receivers**

- BAL – Javorius Allen – 12–107–1
- MIA – DeVante Parker – 3–63–1

**Top tacklers**

- BAL – Daryl Smith – 9
- MIA – Reshad Jones – 7

In another disappointing loss, the Ravens’ offense failed to capitalize on a fantastic defensive performance, with Schaub throwing another pick six along with another interception which also led to Miami's other touchdown. Another Justin Tucker missed field goal from 54 yards was the Ravens’ last chance at a comeback.

==== Week 14: Seattle Seahawks 35, Baltimore Ravens 6 ====
Week Fourteen: Seattle Seahawks at Baltimore Ravens – Game summary

Quarter	1	2	3	4	Total
**Seahawks**	7	7	7	14	**35**
Ravens	0	6	0	0	**6**

at M&T Bank Stadium, Baltimore, Maryland

- Date: December 13
- Game time: 1:00 pm. EST
- Game weather: 71 °F (22 °C), partly cloudy
- Game attendance: 71,179
- Referee: Walt Coleman
- TV announcers (Fox): Thom Brennaman, Charles Davis and Tony Siragusa
- Recap, Gamebook

Game information

**First quarter**

- SEA – 5:08 T. Lockett 8 yd. pass from R. Wilson (S. Hauschka kick) (Drive: 11-80, 6:18) (SEA 7-0)

**Second quarter**

- BAL – 13:39 J. Tucker 28 yd. Field Goal (Drive: 5-32, 2:31) (SEA 7-3)
- SEA – 0:38 D. Baldwin 14 yd. pass from R. Wilson (S. Hauschka kick) (Drive: 2-14, 0:09) (SEA 14-3)
- BAL – 0:00 J. Tucker 30 yd. Field Goal (Drive: 5-68, 0:38) (SEA 14-6)

**Third quarter**

- SEA – 8:54 D. Baldwin 22 yd. pass from R. Wilson (S. Hauschka kick) (Drive: 11-80, 6:06) (SEA 21-6)

**Fourth quarter**

- SEA – 14:53 T. Lockett 49 yd. pass from R. Wilson (S. Hauschka kick) (Drive: 9-86, 5:01) (SEA 28-6)
- SEA – 8:55 D. Baldwin 16 yd. pass from R. Wilson (S. Hauschka kick) (Drive: 4-38, 2:21) (SEA 35-6)

**Top passers**

- SEA – Russell Wilson – 23–32–292–5–0
- BAL – Jimmy Clausen – 23–40–274–0–1

**Top rushers**

- SEA – Thomas Rawls – 6–44–0
- BAL – Terrance West – 5–16–0

**Top receivers**

- SEA – Tyler Lockett – 6–104–2
- BAL – Kamar Aiken – 5–90–0

**Top tacklers**

- SEA – K. J. Wright – 5
- BAL – Shareece Wright – 7

Entering a game in which they were forced to start third-string quarterback Jimmy Clausen, the Ravens were outmaneuvered at every turn against a superior Seahawks team. The loss, combined with the wins by the Steelers and Jets, the Ravens were eliminated from postseason contention. The team dropped to 4-9 and faced their first losing season since 2007. The Ravens also finished 1-3 against the NFC West.

This was the Ravens' first game of the season which was decided by more than one possession as the team's first 12 games were all decided by eight points or less.

==== Week 15: Kansas City Chiefs 34, Baltimore Ravens 14 ====
Week Fifteen: Kansas City Chiefs at Baltimore Ravens – Game summary

Quarter	1	2	3	4	Total
**Chiefs**	14	10	0	10	**34**
Ravens	7	7	0	0	**14**

at M&T Bank Stadium, Baltimore, Maryland

- Date: December 20
- Game time: 1:00 pm. EST
- Game weather: 41 °F (5 °C), sunny
- Game attendance: 70,791
- Referee: Jeff Triplette
- TV announcers (CBS): Kevin Harlan, Rich Gannon and Chris Fischer
- Recap, Gamebook

Game information

**First quarter**

- KC – 9:13 C. West 38 yd. run (C. Santos kick) (Drive: 10-89, 5:47) (KC 7-0)
- BAL – 6:30 K. Juszczyk 1 yd. pass from J. Clausen (J. Tucker kick) (Drive: 6-45, 2:43) (Tied 7-7)
- KC – 2:49 T. Branch 73 yd. fumble return (C. Santos kick) (KC 14-7)

**Second quarter**

- KC – 14:56 J. Maclin 13 yd. pass from A. Smith (C. Santos kick) (Drive: 3-24, 1:21) (KC 21-7)
- KC – 0:50 C. Santos 53 yd. Field Goal (Drive: 8-29, 3:16) (KC 24-7)
- BAL – 0:00 K. Aiken 48 yd. pass from J. Clausen (J. Tucker kick) (Drive: 5-72, 0:50) (KC 24-14)

**Third quarter**

- None

**Fourth quarter**

- KC – 6:45 C. Santos 32 yd. Field Goal (Drive: 14-81, 8:41) (KC 27-14)
- KC – 4:36 M. Peters 90 yd. interception return (Drive: C. Santos kick) (KC 34-14)

**Top passers**

- KC – Alex Smith – 21–25–171–1–0
- BAL – Jimmy Clausen – 26–45–2–2

**Top rushers**

- KC – Charcandrick West – 16–76–1
- BAL – Terrance West – 7–35–0

**Top receivers**

- KC – Travis Kelce – 6–73–0
- BAL – Kamar Aiken – 8–128–1

**Top tacklers**

- KC – Derrick Johnson – 7
- BAL – Kendrick Lewis – 5

The Ravens unexpectedly wore gold pants for this game. This drew criticism from their fan base and it hasn’t been used since. With the loss, the Ravens fell to 4-10 and finished 1-3 against the AFC West.

==== Week 16: Baltimore Ravens 20, Pittsburgh Steelers 17 ====
Week Sixteen: Pittsburgh Steelers at Baltimore Ravens – Game summary

Quarter	1	2	3	4	Total
Steelers	0	3	7	7	**17**
**Ravens**	7	6	0	7	**20**

at M&T Bank Stadium, Baltimore, Maryland

- Date: December 27
- Game time: 1:00 pm. EST
- Game weather: 64 °F (18 °C), overcast
- Game attendance: 71,261
- Referee: Craig Wrolstad
- TV announcers (CBS): Greg Gumbel, Trent Green and Jamie Erdahl
- Recap, Gamebook

Game information

**First quarter**

- BAL – 3:53 C. Matthews 8 yd. pass from R. Mallett (J.Tucker kick) (Drive: 15-75, 7:07) (BAL 7-0)

**Second quarter**

- PIT – 14:48 C. Boswell 34 yd. Field Goal (Drive: 10-64, 4:05) (BAL 7-3)
- BAL – 10:01 J. Tucker 37 yd. Field Goal (Drive: 11-61, 4:47) (BAL 10-3)
- BAL – 1:17 J. Tucker 50 yd. Field Goal (Drive: 7-24, 3:21) (BAL 13-3)

**Third quarter**

- PIT – 11:18 D. Williams 1 yd. run (C. Boswell kick) (Drive: 6-79, 3:01) (BAL 13-10)

**Fourth quarter**

- BAL – 10:35 J. Allen 3 yd. run (J. Tucker kick) (Drive: 5-58, 2:20) (BAL 20-10)
- PIT – 6:33 D. Williams 2 yd. run (C. Boswell kick) (Drive: 8-80, 4:02) (BAL 20-17)

**Top passers**

- PIT – Ben Roethlisberger – 24–34–215–0–2
- BAL – Ryan Mallett – 28–41–274–1–0

**Top rushers**

- PIT – DeAngelo Williams – 17–100–2
- BAL – Javorius Allen – 18–79–1

**Top receivers**

- PIT – Antonio Brown – 7–61–0
- BAL – Kamar Aiken – 8–66–0

**Top tacklers**

- PIT – Ryan Shazier, Cameron Heyward – 5
- BAL – C. J. Mosley – 6

With the win, the Ravens improved to 5–10, and they swept the Steelers for the first time since their 2011 season. Baltimore finished 3-5 at home.

==== Week 17: Cincinnati Bengals 24, Baltimore Ravens 16 ====
Week Seventeen: Baltimore Ravens at Cincinnati Bengals – Game summary

Quarter	1	2	3	4	Total
Ravens	0	9	0	7	**16**
**Bengals**	0	7	14	3	**24**

at Paul Brown Stadium, Cincinnati, Ohio

- Date: January 3, 2016
- Game time: 1:00 pm. EST
- Game weather: 35 °F (2 °C), mostly cloudy
- Game attendance: 57,254
- Referee: Carl Cheffers
- TV announcers (Fox): Thom Brennaman, Charles Davis and Tony Siragusa
- Recap, Gamebook

Game information

**First quarter**

- None

**Second quarter**

- BAL – 12:56 J. Tucker 28 yd. Field Goal (Drive: 7-38, 2:14) (BAL 3-0)
- BAL – 4:55 J. Tucker 50 yd. Field Goal (Drive: 10-33, 4:24) (BAL 6-0)
- CIN – 1:49 T. Eifert 22 yd. pass from A. McCarron (M. Nugent kick) (Drive: 8-81, 3:06) (CIN 7-6)
- BAL – 0:00 J. Tucker 49 yd. Field Goal (Drive: 10-55, 1:49) (BAL 9-7)

**Third quarter**

- CIN – 11:22 A. Green 5 yd. pass from A. McCarron (M. Nugent kick) (Drive: 5-33, 2:34) (CIN 14-9)
- CIN – 6:55 J. Hill 38 yd. run (M. Nugent kick) (Drive: 6-62, 2:12) (CIN 21-9)

**Fourth quarter**

- CIN – 4:06 M. Nugent 52 yd. Field Goal (Drive: 8-21, 4:27) (CIN 24-9)
- BAL – 1:47 K. Juszczyk 2 yd. pass from R. Mallett (J. Tucker kick) (Drive: 8-75, 2:19) (CIN 24-16)

**Top passers**

- BAL – Ryan Mallett – 30–56–292–1–2
- CIN – A. J. McCarron – 17–27–160–2–0

**Top rushers**

- BAL – Javorius Allen – 15–38–0
- CIN – Jeremy Hill – 16–96–1

**Top receivers**

- BAL – Kamar Aiken – 5–76–0
- CIN – Tyler Eifert – 4–51–1

**Top tacklers**

- BAL – C. J. Mosley, Shareece Wright – 4
- CIN – Vontaze Burfict – 8

The Ravens suffered their fifth straight loss to the Bengals, this time led by second year quarterback A. J. McCarron, who threw two touchdowns while Ravens starter Ryan Mallett was intercepted twice. The loss dropped the Ravens to 5–11, their worst record since their 2007 season and they finished 3-3 against the AFC North and 1-7 on the road. This was the final game for cornerback Tray Walker, as he died on March 18, 2016. This would be the Ravens last losing season until 2021.

=== Standings ===
==== Division ====
AFC North
	W	L	T	PCT	DIV	CONF	PF	PA	STK
^{(3)} Cincinnati Bengals	12	4	0	.750	5–1	9–3	419	279	W1
^{(6)} Pittsburgh Steelers	10	6	0	.625	3–3	7–5	423	319	W1
Baltimore Ravens	5	11	0	.313	3–3	4–8	328	401	L1
Cleveland Browns	3	13	0	.188	1–5	2–10	278	432	L3

==== Conference ====
AFC
#	Team	Division	W	L	T	PCT	DIV	CONF	SOS	SOV	STK
**Division Leaders**
1 (Note: Denver finished ahead of New England and Cincinnati for the No. 1 seed based on head-to-head sweep. New England finished ahead of Cincinnati for the No. 2 seed based on record vs. common opponents — New England's cumulative record against Buffalo, Denver, Houston and Pittsburgh was 4–1, while Cincinnati's cumulative record against the same four teams was 2–3.)	Denver Broncos	West	12	4	0	.750	4–2	8–4	.500	.479	W2
2	New England Patriots	East	12	4	0	.750	4–2	9–3	.473	.448	L2
3	Cincinnati Bengals	North	12	4	0	.750	5–1	9–3	.477	.406	W1
4	Houston Texans	South	9	7	0	.563	5–1	7–5	.496	.410	W3
**Wild Cards**
5	Kansas City Chiefs	West	11	5	0	.688	5–1	10–2	.496	.432	W10
6 (Note: Pittsburgh finished ahead of the New York Jets for the No. 6 seed and qualified for the last playoff spot based on record vs. common opponents — Pittsburgh's cumulative record against Cleveland, Indianapolis, New England and Oakland was 4–1, while the Jets' cumulative record against the same four teams was 3–2.)	Pittsburgh Steelers	North	10	6	0	.625	3–3	7–5	.504	.463	W1
**Did not qualify for the postseason**
7	New York Jets	East	10	6	0	.625	3–3	7–5	.441	.388	L1
8 (Note: Buffalo finished ahead of Indianapolis based on head-to-head victory.)	Buffalo Bills	East	8	8	0	.500	4–2	7–5	.508	.438	W2
9	Indianapolis Colts	South	8	8	0	.500	4–2	6–6	.500	.406	W2
10	Oakland Raiders	West	7	9	0	.438	3–3	7–5	.512	.366	L1
11	Miami Dolphins	East	6	10	0	.375	1–5	4–8	.469	.469	W2
12 (Note: Jacksonville finished ahead of Baltimore based on head-to-head victory.)	Jacksonville Jaguars	South	5	11	0	.313	2–4	5–7	.473	.375	L3
13	Baltimore Ravens	North	5	11	0	.313	3–3	4–8	.508	.425	L1
14	San Diego Chargers	West	4	12	0	.250	0–6	3–9	.527	.328	L2
15 (Note: Cleveland finished ahead of Tennessee based on head-to-head victory.)	Cleveland Browns	North	3	13	0	.188	1–5	2–10	.531	.271	L3
16	Tennessee Titans	South	3	13	0	.188	1–5	1–11	.492	.375	L4
**Tiebreakers** (Note: When breaking ties for three or more teams under the NFL's rules, they are first broken within divisions, then comparing only the highest ranked remaining team from each division.)
