= Daryl Smith (linebacker) =

American football player (born 1982)

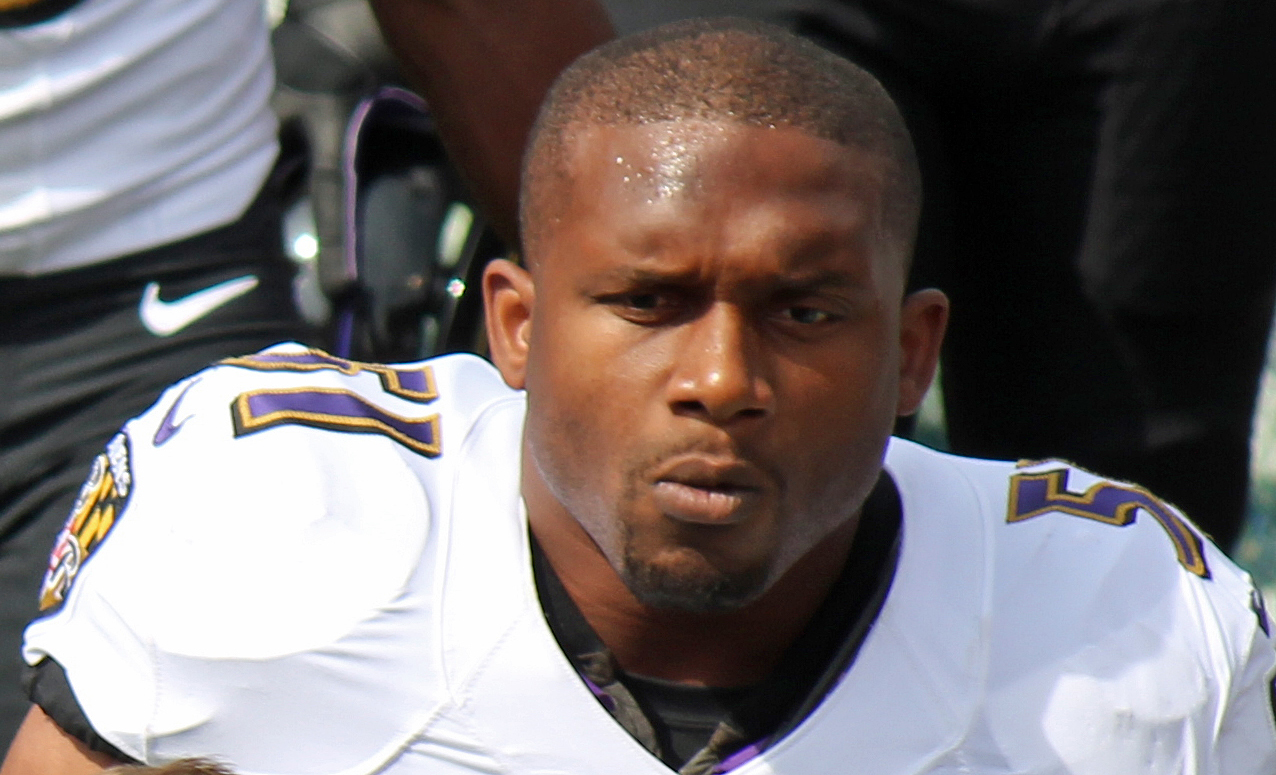
- Smith with the Baltimore Ravens in 2015

No. 51, 52
- Position: Linebacker

Personal information
- Born: March 14, 1982 (age 44); Albany, Georgia, U.S.
- Listed height: 6 ft 2 in (1.88 m)
- Listed weight: 250 lb (113 kg)

Career information
- High school: Dougherty (Albany)
- College: Georgia Tech (2000–2003)
- NFL draft: 2004: 2nd round, 39th overall pick

Career history
- Jacksonville Jaguars (2004–2012); Baltimore Ravens (2013–2015); Tampa Bay Buccaneers (2016)

Awards and highlights
- NFL forced fumbles co-leader (2014)

Career NFL statistics
- Total tackles: 1,088
- Sacks: 30.5
- Forced fumbles: 15
- Fumble recoveries: 7
- Interceptions: 12
- Defensive touchdowns: 2
- Stats at Pro Football Reference

Daryl Lamont Smith (born March 14, 1982) is an American former professional football player who was a linebacker in the National Football League (NFL). He played college football for the Georgia Tech Yellow Jackets and was selected by the Jacksonville Jaguars in the second round of the 2004 NFL draft. Smith also played for the Baltimore Ravens and Tampa Bay Buccaneers.

== College career ==
Smith attended Georgia Tech in Atlanta, Georgia. At Georgia Tech, he was a four-year letterman and a team captain who led the team in tackles for two of his four years. He started 44 of 46 games while at Georgia Tech, recording 383 tackles, 15 sacks, and three interceptions.

== Professional career ==
Pre-draft measurables
Height	Weight	Arm length	Hand span	40-yard dash	20-yard shuttle	Three-cone drill	Vertical jump	Broad jump	Bench press
6 ft 1 5/8 in (1.87 m)	234 lb (106 kg)	33 1/8 in (0.84 m)	9 3/4 in (0.25 m)	4.60 s	4.21 s	7.25 s	36.5 in (0.93 m)	9 ft 3 in (2.82 m)	24 reps
All values from NFL Combine/Pro Day

=== Jacksonville Jaguars ===
The Jacksonville Jaguars selected Smith in the second round (39th overall) of the 2004 NFL draft. He was the fifth linebacker drafted in 2004.

On July 24, 2004, the Jacksonville Jaguars signed Smith to a four-year, $3.25 million contract that includes a signing bonus of $952,000.

In his rookie season, he started 13 games and played in 15, but was slowed by a knee injury in the middle of the season. However, he still managed to finish eighth on the team in tackles with 78, and record two sacks, one interception and one fumble recovery. Has started 90 of 92 games and missed only three games due to injuries.

He earned AFC Defensive Player of the Week honors in the first week of the 2010 NFL season for a performance against the Denver Broncos that included 7 tackles and an interception that sealed the win for the Jaguars.

On November 28, 2010, Smith became the Jacksonville Jaguars all-time leader in tackles, surpassing former safety Donovin Darius.

Daryl Smith has passed the 100 tackle mark in seven straight years as of 2011.

Smith missed the first six games of the 2012 season due to injury. He was placed on the injured reserve-designated for return list on October 25, meaning he was eligible to return in week 15. He returned to play the New England Patriots in week 16 and recorded four tackles.

Smith became a free agent on March 12, 2013.

=== Baltimore Ravens ===
Smith signed a one-year contract with the defending Super Bowl XLVII champions Baltimore Ravens on June 5, 2013. The signing was meant to strengthen the Ravens' inside linebacker core following Ray Lewis' retirement, and losing Dannell Ellerbe to free agency. Smith soon took control of the starting job. During Week 3 of the regular season, he had his first interception return for a touchdown in a 30–9 victory against the Houston Texans. On December 9, 2013, he broke Ray Lewis' franchise record for most pass deflections in a single season (17) with 19. Smith ended his first season in Baltimore with a team leading 123 tackles and erased any doubts about his ability to still play at a high level after the injury that kept him sidelined most of the 2012 season.^{[5}^{]}

On March 14, 2014, his 32nd birthday, Smith re-signed with the Ravens on a four-year, $16.1 million contract.

Smith recorded 118 tackles, 3 sacks, and an interception in the 2015 season for the Baltimore Ravens. On March 3, 2016, he was released by the Ravens.

=== Tampa Bay Buccaneers ===
On March 17, 2016, Smith signed a one-year contract with the Tampa Bay Buccaneers.

== NFL career statistics ==
Legend
	Led the league
**Bold**	Career high

=== Regular season ===
Year	Team	Games		Tackles					Interceptions					Fumbles			
Year	Team	GP	GS	Cmb	Solo	Ast	Sck	TFL	Int	Yds	TD	Lng	PD	FF	FR	Yds	TD
2004	JAX	15	13	52	44	8	2.0	6	1	0	0	0	4	0	1	0	0
2005	JAX	**16**	**16**	82	70	12	4.0	**10**	1	0	0	0	2	0	0	0	0
2006	JAX	**16**	**16**	89	73	16	3.0	8	1	4	0	4	7	1	0	0	0
2007	JAX	15	15	71	54	17	1.5	6	0	0	0	0	4	0	**2**	**77**	**1**
2008	JAX	14	14	70	60	10	2.5	5	0	0	0	0	3	1	0	0	0
2009	JAX	**16**	**16**	107	**84**	23	1.5	6	1	10	0	10	6	3	**2**	0	0
2010	JAX	**16**	**16**	97	75	22	3.5	9	1	8	0	8	5	1	0	0	0
2011	JAX	**16**	**16**	107	74	33	3.5	7	1	25	0	25	8	2	0	0	0
2012	JAX	2	2	7	6	1	0.0	0	0	0	0	0	0	0	0	0	0
2013	BAL	**16**	**16**	123	57	**66**	**5.0**	8	**3**	**41**	**1**	**37**	**18**	2	0	0	0
2014	BAL	**16**	**16**	**127**	67	60	1.0	3	1	0	0	0	8	**5**	1	39	0
2015	BAL	**16**	**16**	121	72	49	3.0	7	1	-1	0	-1	3	0	0	0	0
2016	TAM	**16**	11	35	28	7	0.0	3	1	-5	0	-5	1	0	1	0	0
		190	183	1,088	764	324	30.5	78	12	82	1	37	69	15	7	116	1

=== Playoffs ===
Year	Team	Games		Tackles					Interceptions					Fumbles			
Year	Team	GP	GS	Cmb	Solo	Ast	Sck	TFL	Int	Yds	TD	Lng	PD	FF	FR	Yds	TD
2005	JAX	1	1	7	7	0	**1.0**	**1**	0	0	0	0	0	0	0	0	0
2007	JAX	**2**	**2**	**20**	11	**9**	0.0	0	0	0	0	0	0	0	0	0	0
2014	BAL	**2**	**2**	16	**13**	3	0.0	0	**1**	0	0	0	**1**	**2**	0	0	0
		5	5	43	31	12	1.0	1	1	0	0	0	1	2	0	0	0
