= Kaelin Clay =

American football player (born 1992)

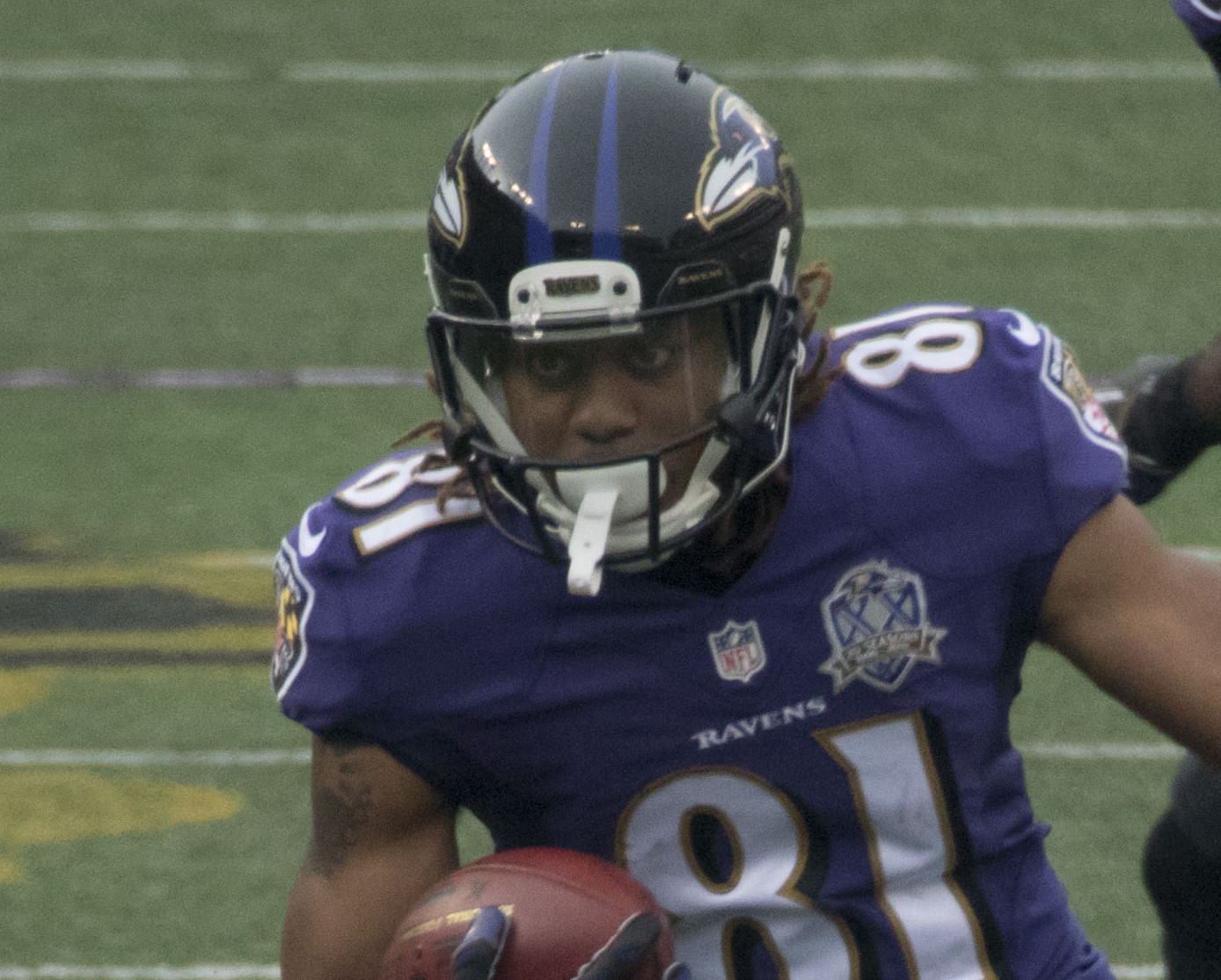
- Clay with the Baltimore Ravens in 2015

No. 81, 13, 12, 15
- Positions: Wide receiver, return specialist

Personal information
- Born: January 3, 1992 (age 34); Long Beach, California, U.S.
- Listed height: 5 ft 10 in (1.78 m)
- Listed weight: 195 lb (88 kg)

Career information
- High school: Long Beach Polytechnic
- College: California (2010–2011); Mt. San Antonio (2012–2013); Utah (2014)
- NFL draft: 2015: 6th round, 184th overall pick

Career history
- Tampa Bay Buccaneers (2015)*; Detroit Lions (2015)*; Baltimore Ravens (2015–2016); Carolina Panthers (2017)*; Buffalo Bills (2017); Carolina Panthers (2017); Buffalo Bills (2018)*; New York Giants (2018); Salt Lake Stallions (2019)
- * Offseason or practice squad member only

Awards and highlights
- First-team All-American (2014); First-team All-Pac-12 (2014)

Career NFL statistics
- Receptions: 6
- Receiving yards: 85
- Return yards: 803
- Return touchdowns: 2
- Stats at Pro Football Reference

Kaelin Clay (born January 3, 1992) is an American former professional football player who was a wide receiver in the National Football League (NFL). He played college football for the Utah Utes, earning first-team All-American honors in 2014. He was selected by the Tampa Bay Buccaneers in the sixth round of the 2015 NFL draft.

== Early life, family and education ==
Clay attended Long Beach Polytechnic High School in Long Beach, California. He caught 20 passes for 502 yards and six touchdowns in his junior season on a team that won the Southern Section title. He began his SuperPrep All-American and All-Moore League senior season as a wide receiver before moving to the backfield for the final four games. He rushed for 1,048 yards and posted another 524 receiving to combine for 1,572 rushing and receiving yards as a senior while scoring 15 touchdowns (eight receiving, seven rushings) and adding 13 punt returns for 206 yards. Clay was ranked as the No. 53 wide receiver nationally by Rivals.com and the media outlet's No. 79 player overall in California.

Clay was a standout track & field athlete as well, finishing third in California as a senior in 2010 in the 100-meter dash (10.44) and fourth in the 200-meter dash (21.07) with career-best times in both. He helped his track squad win Moore League titles in each his four seasons, while he was a four-time winner (100 meters, 200 meters, 4x100 meter relay, 4x400 meter relay) at the league track meet in each of his final two seasons, as well as the winner in both the 100m and 200m for each of his final three campaigns.

== College career ==
Clay initially attended Mt. San Antonio College, where he was named first-team all-conference with 16 touchdowns. In 2014, he transferred to Utah and played his final year there, making four different All-American teams as a return specialist and was named first-team All-Pac-12 Conference as a return specialist. He finished the season with a punt return average of 15.0 and three touchdowns. He returned a kickoff for a touchdown that season and averaged 24.9 years on kickoff returns.

On November 8, 2014, Clay received national coverage due to a mistake. With Utah up 7–0 against the Oregon Ducks, on what would have been Clay's defining 79-yard touchdown for his collegiate career, he celebrated prematurely and dropped the ball on the 1-yard line, allowing Oregon's Joe Walker to recover the ball and return it 99 yards for a touchdown in the opposite direction. It changed the potential 14–0 score to a 7–7 tie; Oregon would go on to win the game 51–27.

== Professional career ==
Pre-draft measurables
Height	Weight	40-yard dash	10-yard split	20-yard split	20-yard shuttle	Three-cone drill	Vertical jump	Broad jump	Bench press
5 ft 10 in (1.78 m)	195 lb (88 kg)	4.45 s	1.59 s	2.59 s	4.26 s	6.97 s	33 in (0.84 m)	9 ft 5 in (2.87 m)	10 reps
All values from NFL Combine, 40-yard dash from Pro Day

=== Tampa Bay Buccaneers ===
The Tampa Bay Buccaneers selected Clay in the sixth round of the 2015 NFL draft with the 184th overall pick. On September 5, 2015, he was waived by the Buccaneers and was signed to the practice squad. On September 15, 2015, he was released by the Buccaneers.

=== Detroit Lions ===
On September 22, 2015, Clay was signed by the Detroit Lions to the practice squad.

=== Baltimore Ravens ===
On November 17, 2015, Clay was signed by the Baltimore Ravens from the Lions' practice squad. On November 22, 2015, Clay played in his first career game against the St. Louis Rams. The next week against their divisional rival, Cleveland Browns, Clay returned the Browns’ first punt for an 82-yard touchdown on Monday Night Football.

During the August 11 preseason opener against the Carolina Panthers, Clay fumbled a punt, giving Carolina possession. He was waived/injured by the Ravens on August 15, 2016, and was placed on injured reserve. He was released from the Ravens' injured reserve list on November 11, 2016.

=== Carolina Panthers (first stint) ===
On April 7, 2017, Clay signed a one-year contract with the Panthers.

=== Buffalo Bills (first stint) ===
On September 2, 2017, Clay was traded to the Buffalo Bills for cornerback Kevon Seymour. He was waived by the Bills on October 23, 2017.

=== Carolina Panthers (second stint) ===
On October 24, 2017, Clay was claimed off waivers by the Panthers. On November 26, 2017, he returned a punt for a touchdown against the New York Jets. It was the second of his career.

=== Buffalo Bills (second stint) ===
On March 29, 2018, Clay signed with the Bills. He was waived on September 1, 2018.

=== New York Giants ===
On September 1, 2018, Clay was claimed off waivers by the New York Giants. He was placed on injured reserve on September 25, 2018, after suffering a sprained ankle in Week 2. He was released on October 2, 2018.

=== Salt Lake Stallions ===
On December 22, 2018, Clay signed with the Salt Lake Stallions of the Alliance of American Football. He was placed on injured reserve on March 13, 2019. The league ceased operations in April 2019.
