= Justin Forsett =

American football player (born 1985)

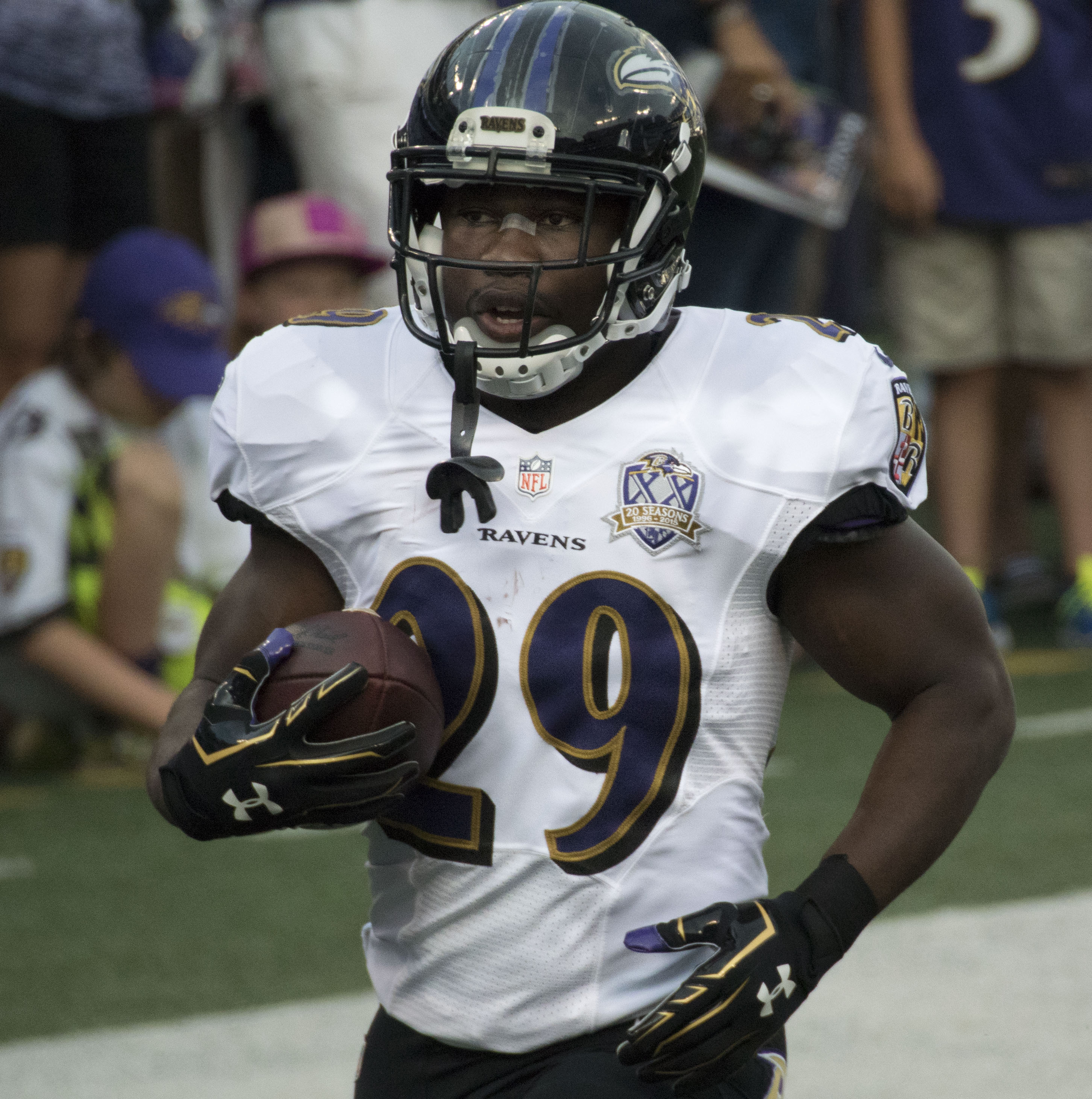
- Forsett with the Baltimore Ravens in 2015

No. 30, 20, 28, 21, 29
- Position: Running back

Personal information
- Born: October 14, 1985 (age 41); Lakeland, Florida, U.S.
- Listed height: 5 ft 8 in (1.73 m)
- Listed weight: 195 lb (88 kg)

Career information
- High school: Grace Prep (Arlington, Texas)
- College: California (2004–2007)
- NFL draft: 2008: 7th round, 233rd overall pick

Career history
- Seattle Seahawks (2008); Indianapolis Colts (2008); Seattle Seahawks (2008–2011); Houston Texans (2012); Jacksonville Jaguars (2013); Baltimore Ravens (2014–2016); Detroit Lions (2016); Denver Broncos (2016)

Awards and highlights
- Pro Bowl (2014); First-team All-Pac-10 (2007)

Career NFL statistics
- Rushing yards: 3,890
- Rushing average: 4.7
- Rushing touchdowns: 19
- Receptions: 210
- Receiving yards: 1,351
- Receiving touchdowns: 1
- Stats at Pro Football Reference

Justin Forsett (born October 14, 1985), is an American former professional football player who was a running back in the National Football League (NFL). He played college football for the California Golden Bears and was selected by the Seattle Seahawks in the seventh round of the 2008 NFL draft. Forsett also played for the Indianapolis Colts, Houston Texans, Jacksonville Jaguars, Baltimore Ravens, Detroit Lions, and Denver Broncos. Forsett's best season came in 2014 as a member of the Ravens, when he was selected as a Pro Bowl alternate after finishing the season with career highs in carries (235), rushing yards (1,266) and touchdowns (8).

== Early life ==
Forsett was born in Lakeland, Florida. He moved to Arlington, Texas, in his sophomore year of high school after living in Mulberry, Florida. Forsett attended high school at Grace Preparatory Academy in Arlington, where he played football, basketball and ran track. In football, he set several school records. In his final two seasons, he had 63 touchdowns and rushed for nearly 5,000 yards, leading Grace Prep to two Texas Association of Private and Parochial Schools division 4A state championships. In high school, his nickname was "The Truth". His father Rodney is a minister and a coach. Forsett plays the tenor saxophone and taught himself a little piano. He lists video games and photography as his hobbies. Reggie White is his biggest inspiration.

In track & field, Forsett competed in sprints and relays during his final two years at Grace Prep. As a senior, he recorded personal-best times of 11.07 seconds in the 100-meter dash, 23.3 seconds in the 200-meter dash and 54.1 seconds in the 400-meter dash. At the 2004 TAPPS State Championships, he ran the lead leg on the Grace Prep 4 × 100m and 4 × 200m squads, helping them capture the state title in both events with times of 43.13 seconds and 1:30.97 minutes, respectively.

Close to signing day, the Forsett family believed that Notre Dame had made a scholarship offer to Forsett. Notre Dame coaches later contended they had not offered Forsett a scholarship. Notre Dame's running backs coach at the time, Buzz Preston, later said that Notre Dame was looking for a taller running back.

The Texas Longhorns decided not to offer Forsett a scholarship because of his small size. Forsett's coach Mike Barber, a former NFL player, distributed Forsett's game tape to colleges across the country. California Golden Bears coach Jeff Tedford offered Forsett a scholarship after watching Forsett's game tape and receiving a tip from former Cal player Chuck Muncie, and made Forsett one of the last signings of Cal's 2004 recruiting class.

== College career ==
With a deep depth chart at running back, it appeared Forsett would redshirt his freshman year at the University of California, Berkeley, but an impressive performance in fall camp kept him on the active roster. In the season opener, Forsett had 34 yards rushing and a touchdown in Cal's victory over Air Force. Forsett played mostly as a backup during his first three years behind J. J. Arrington and Marshawn Lynch. Nevertheless, he managed to amass a good amount of playing time. During his freshman year, Forsett was used primarily on special teams, returning one kickoff for 11 yards but usually blocking for Marshawn Lynch. On coverage units, he made three tackles and blocked a punt in the endzone for a touchdown against Washington.

During his sophomore year, Forsett became second on the Cal depth chart at running back. He filled in when Lynch was injured in the early season and ran for 235 yards against New Mexico State, good for the fourth highest single game rushing effort in school history. In Forsett's junior year, he continued his role as backup. He ran for over 100-yards against Oregon when injuries sidelined Lynch and in Cal's rout of Texas A&M in the 2006 Holiday Bowl.

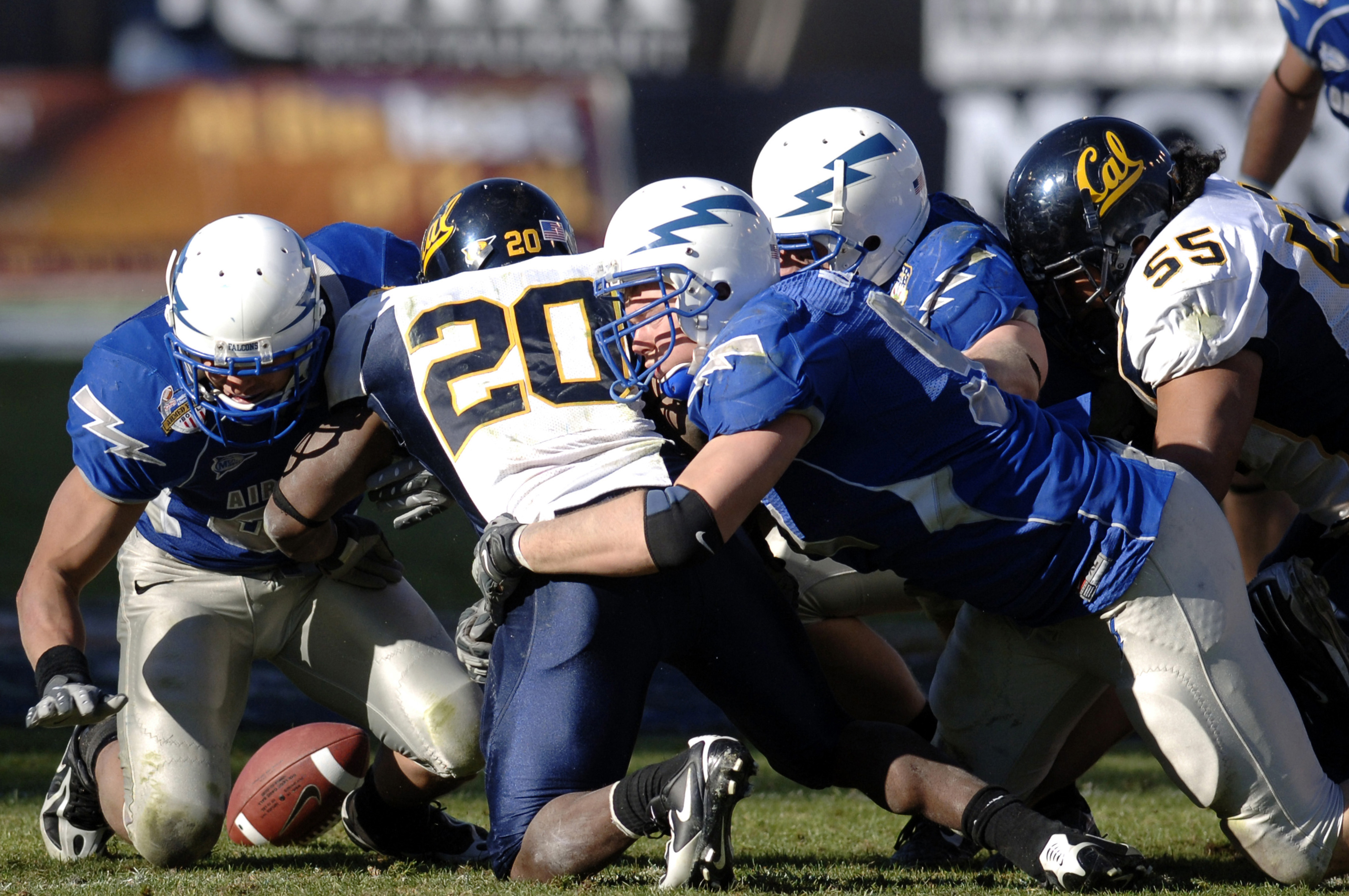
Forsett (no. 20) at the 2007 Armed Forces Bowl

As a starter his senior year, Forsett rushed for 1,546 yards on 305 carries, and scored 15 touchdowns. He opened the season with 156 yards rushing and a touchdown against Tennessee. His 15 touchdowns led all rushers in the Pac-10, and his 1,546 rushing yards finished second, behind Oregon tailback Jonathan Stewart. Forsett's efforts earned him a selection to the All-Pacific-10 Conference first-team. Forsett ended his college career rushing for 140 yards and two touchdowns in a 42–36 Cal victory over Air Force in the 2007 Armed Forces Bowl.

== Professional career ==
Pre-draft measurables
Height	Weight	Arm length	Hand span	40-yard dash	10-yard split	20-yard split	20-yard shuttle	Three-cone drill	Vertical jump	Broad jump	Bench press
5 ft 8 in (1.73 m)	194 lb (88 kg)	31 in (0.79 m)	10 3/8 in (0.26 m)	4.62 s	1.51 s	2.62 s	4.46 s	6.96 s	31 in (0.79 m)	9 ft 9 in (2.97 m)	26 reps
All values from NFL Combine and Pro Day

=== Seattle Seahawks (first stint) ===
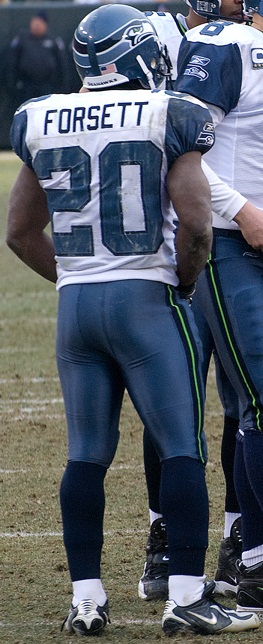
Forsett with the Seattle Seahawks in 2009

Forsett was selected by the Seattle Seahawks in the seventh round in the 2008 NFL draft. He scored his first NFL touchdown on August 16, 2008, in a preseason game against the Chicago Bears, during which he also gained 261 all purpose yards, with 136 rushing and 125 return yards. The total was 55 yards more than the entire Chicago Bears' offense for the night. One game into the regular season, Forsett was waived by the Seahawks on September 5, 2008.

=== Indianapolis Colts ===
A day after being waived by the Seahawks, Forsett was claimed off waivers by the Indianapolis Colts on September 10, 2008. He was waived on October 8.

=== Seattle Seahawks (second stint) ===
A day after being waived by the Colts, Forsett was re-signed to the practice squad of the Seahawks on October 9, 2008. Forsett was then signed from the practice squad on October 14, 2008, and became the return specialist. For the 2009 season, he was slated to compete with Julius Jones and Edgerrin James for touches in a crowded Seahawks backfield. After the release of Edgerrin James, Forsett became the teams No. 2 back which gave him an opportunity to get more touches and make a bigger on-the-field impact. On November 15, Julius Jones, the starting running back for the Seahawks, left a game against the Arizona Cardinals with a bruised lung. Forsett filled in for Jones, rushing for 123 yards and his first regular season touchdown. He started as the primary running back on November 22 game against the Minnesota Vikings, scoring his second touchdown on a 9-yard run. With the Seahawks' running game struggling, Forsett also caught 8 passes for 80 yards. On November 29 against the St. Louis Rams, he rushed for a career-high 130 yards and two scores. With the return of Julius Jones in week 13 against the San Francisco 49ers, Forsett was relegated back to the position of 2nd-string running-back. He saw only 8 touches, rushing for a net gain of 9 yards, reception of 25 yards, and one touchdown.

In the 2010 season, Forsett had 523 yards on 118 carries, with two touchdowns. In 2011, Forsett was only able to amass 145 yards on 46 carries, with one touchdown.

The Seahawks did not re-sign Forsett after his contract expired following the 2011 season.

=== Houston Texans ===
Forsett signed with the Houston Texans on June 2, 2012. In the Texans' final 2012 NFL preseason game, played against the Minnesota Vikings, Forsett broke Arian Foster's preseason record of 110 yards rushing. On Thanksgiving Day, November 22, 2012, Forsett scored an 81-yard touchdown, the longest running play in Texans history at the time. Replays showed that Forsett was down by contact before making a first down, but the play was not reviewed due to the Lions Head Coach, Jim Schwartz, who illegally threw a challenge flag on the automatically reviewable scoring play. Forsett has since admitted he was down by contact. The Texans would eventually win the game against the Detroit Lions in overtime 34–31.

=== Jacksonville Jaguars ===
Forsett signed with the Jacksonville Jaguars on March 15, 2013.

He was placed on injured reserve on December 9, 2013, due to a foot injury. He was released on March 11, 2014.

=== Baltimore Ravens ===
==== 2014 ====
Forsett signed a one-year deal with the Baltimore Ravens on April 4, 2014. Initially signed as a likely third stringer behind Ray Rice and Bernard Pierce, Forsett was thrust into the starting role at the beginning of the season due to the suspension and subsequent release of Rice, and injuries to Pierce. Forsett performed well enough to keep the starting job even after Pierce was healthy again.

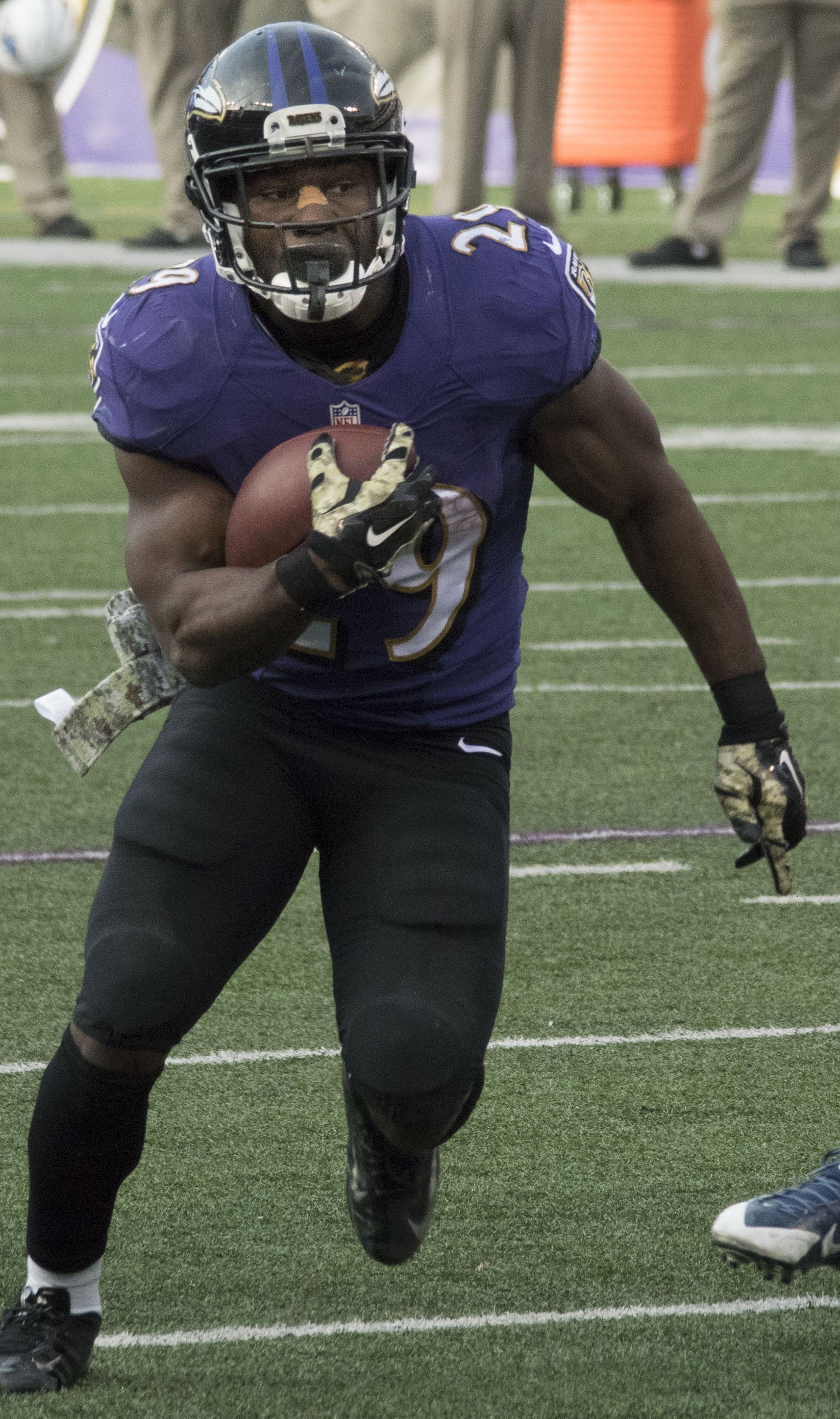
Forsett playing in 2014

In the 2014 season opener against the Cincinnati Bengals, Forsett carried the ball 11 times for 70 yards and rushed for a touchdown, which was the first of the Ravens' season. He also caught 5 passes for 14 yards. The Ravens lost 23–16.

In Week 4 against the Carolina Panthers, Forsett carried the ball 14 times for 66 yards and a touchdown. He also caught three passes for 31 yards. The Ravens blew out the Panthers 38–10.

In Week 5 against the Indianapolis Colts, Forsett carried the ball a mere 6 times and ran for 42 yards. He also caught 7 passes for 55 yards. Forsett scored the Ravens' only touchdown of the game on an 11-yard rush.

In Week 12 against the New Orleans Saints, Forsett had his best game as pro with 22 carries for 182 yards on two touchdowns along with 2 receptions for 8 yards. The Ravens won the game 34–27.

In Week 13, the Ravens played the San Diego Chargers. Forsett passed the 1,000 rushing yards mark for the first time in his career. He carried the ball 24 times and ran for 106 yards.

In Week 14, Forsett carried the ball 13 times for 71 yards and a touchdown. He also caught 2 balls for 7 yards, as the Ravens beat the Miami Dolphins 28–13.

In the season finale, the Ravens played the Cleveland Browns. They won 20–10 and clinched the final playoff spot in the AFC. Forsett contributed to a good ground game, carrying the ball 17 times for 119 yards. He also caught 2 passes for 17 yards.

In the Divisional round of the playoffs, against the New England Patriots, Forsett carried the ball 24 times for 129 yards. He also had 2 receptions for 17 yards, including a 16-yard touchdown catch.

Forsett finished the season with career highs in carries (235), rushing yards (1,266) and touchdowns (8). He fumbled one time, and recovered it. He also caught 44 passes for 263 receiving yards. He also played in the 2015 Pro Bowl as an alternate.

==== 2015 ====
On March 12, 2015, Forsett re-signed with the Ravens on a three-year deal worth $9 million.

In the Ravens season opener against the Denver Broncos, Forsett had a 20-yard fourth quarter run to put the Ravens in position for a game-winning touchdown. However, they could not capitalize and lost the game.

In Week 2, Forsett ran the ball 15 times for 68 yards in a 37–33 loss to the Oakland Raiders.

Forsett broke out in a Week 4 matchup against the division rival Pittsburgh Steelers, running the ball 27 times for 150 yards and helping the Ravens win their first game of the season.

The next week, Forsett ran the ball 21 times for 121 yards and scored a touchdown, as well as catching four passes for 49 yards, but the Ravens lost to the Cleveland Browns.

Forsett ran for 62 yards the following week against the San Francisco 49ers, scored the opening touchdown in a primetime game against the Arizona Cardinals, ran for 69 yards against the San Diego Chargers and had 53 yards against his former team, the Jacksonville Jaguars. The Ravens won only one of those games.

In a Week 11 game against the St. Louis Rams, Forsett suffered a season ending broken right arm after he was picked up and slammed down by St. Louis defensive end Aaron Donald. On November 27, 2015, he was placed on injured reserve. Forsett finished the year having played and started 10 games, rushing 151 times for 641 yards and two touchdowns.

==== 2016 ====
On September 3, 2016, Forsett was released by the Ravens. Two days later, Forsett re-signed with the Ravens but was released again on October 4, 2016.

=== Detroit Lions ===
On October 11, 2016, Forsett was signed by the Lions. He was released by the Lions on December 3, 2016. He appeared in two games for them and had 13 carries for 38 rushing yards.

=== Denver Broncos ===
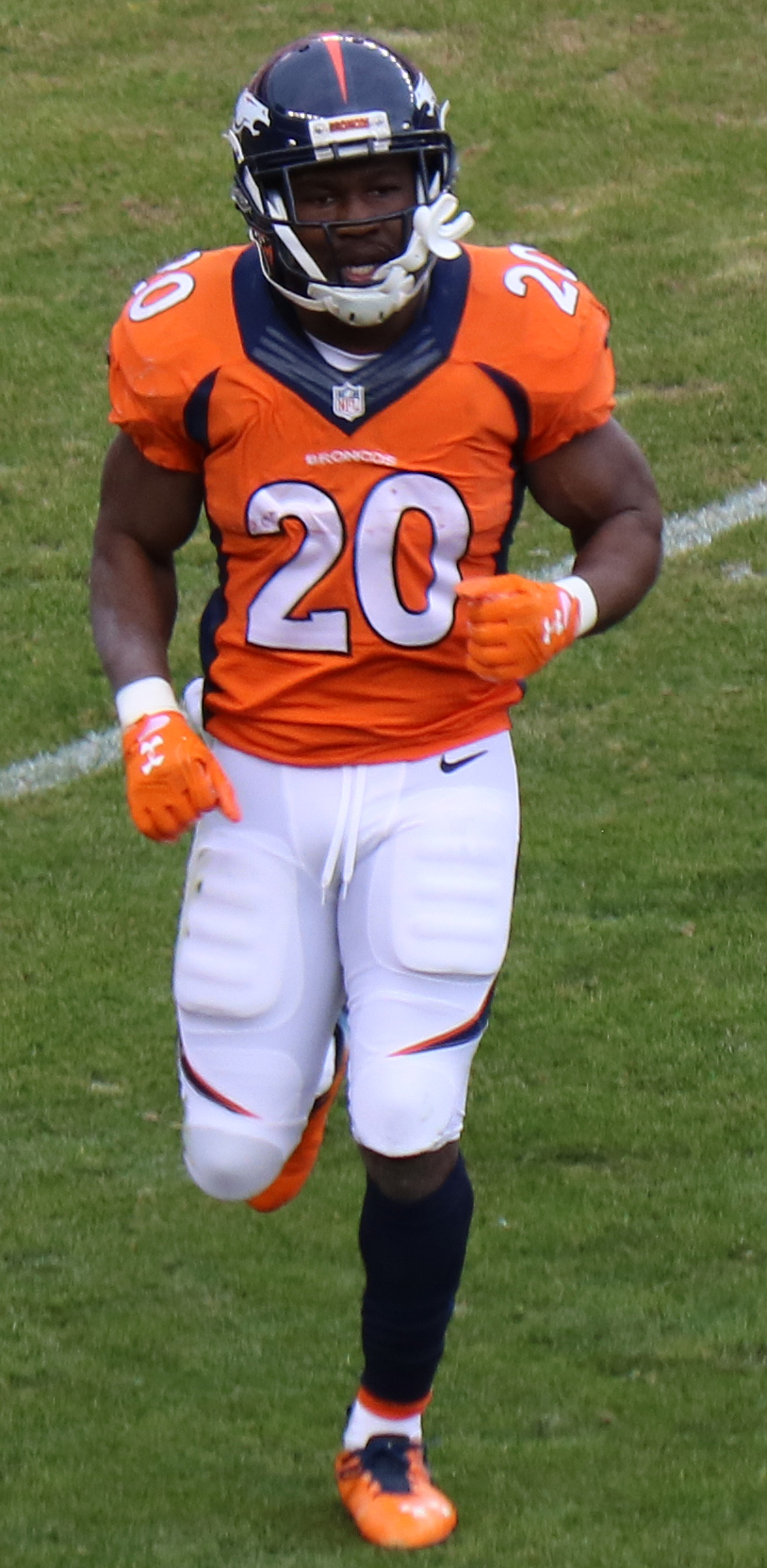
Forsett with the Denver Broncos in 2016

Forsett was claimed off waivers by the Broncos on December 5, 2016. This reunited him with Bronco's head coach Gary Kubiak for the third time in his career with a third different team. He previously played for Kubiak under the Texans and Ravens. On December 11, 2016, he made his debut for the Broncos and finished the 10–13 loss to the Tennessee Titans with six carries for 17 rushing yards and three receptions for 18 receiving yards.

On May 3, 2017, Forsett announced his retirement from the NFL. Forsett stated through social media: “I’m officially announcing my retirement from the game I love. It’s been an amazing ride and I’m grateful for every moment. My career has brought so many great people into my life, and I asked some of them to join me in saying goodbye.” Forsett completed his NFL career with 3,890 rushing yards, 1,351 receiving yards and 20 total touchdowns. He retired as a Baltimore Raven.

== Career statistics ==
=== NFL ===
Year	Team	Games		Rushing					Receiving					Fumbles	
Year	Team	GP	GS	Att	Yds	Avg	Lng	TD	Rec	Yds	Avg	Lng	TD	Fum	Lost
2008	IND	4	0	0	0	0.0	0	0	0	0	0.0	0	0	0	0
2008	SEA	10	0	0	0	0.0	0	0	0	0	0.0	0	0	0	0
2009	SEA	16	2	114	619	5.4	35	4	41	350	8.5	47	1	4	1
2010	SEA	16	5	118	523	4.4	32	2	33	254	7.6	21	0	0	0
2011	SEA	16	0	46	145	3.2	22T	1	23	128	5.6	18	0	0	0
2012	HOU	16	0	63	374	5.9	81T	1	3	38	12.7	18	0	0	0
2013	JAX	9	0	6	31	5.2	10	0	15	82	5.5	14	0	1	0
2014	BAL	16	14	235	1,266	5.4	52	8	44	263	6.0	26	0	1	0
2015	BAL	10	10	151	641	4.2	33	2	31	153	4.9	32	0	0	0
2016	BAL	3	3	31	98	3.1	11	0	11	36	3.3	10	0	0	0
2016	DET	2	0	13	38	2.9	9	0	2	15	7.5	8	0	0	0
2016	DEN	4	3	43	155	3.6	64	1	7	34	4.9	11	0	1	1
Total		122	37	820	3,890	4.7	81	19	210	1,351	6.4	47	1	7	2

=== College ===
Season	Team	Games		Rushing					Receiving				
Season	Team	GP	GS	Att	Yds	Avg	Lng	TD	Rec	Yds	Avg	Lng	TD
2004	California	11	0	11	49	4.5	—	1	0	0	0.0	0	0
2005	California	12	3	132	999	7.6	—	6	7	68	9.7	22	0
2006	California	13	1	119	626	5.3	—	4	12	116	9.7	25	1
2007	California	13	13	305	1,546	5.1	—	15	22	202	9.2	49	0
Totals		49	17	567	3,220	5.7	—	26	41	386	9.4	49	1

== Post-career life ==
Forsett had an idea in college for a "shower pill", and after retirement developed the product as well as complementing products and signed fellow players Jonathan Stewart, Steve Smith Sr. and others to invest in the brand.

Forsett is featured in the final episode of Long Shot along with Chad Johnson and Larry English.

In 2017 Forsett joined the Ravens' radio broadcast crew, to serve as a color analyst for four regular-season games.

In the summer of 2018, Forsett was co-captain and a player for Godspeed, a flag football team made of former professional American football players that participated in the American Flag Football League (AFFL). The team were crowned the champions of participating pro teams but lost in the final match to the amateur champion team.
