= Travis Coons =

American football player (born 1992)

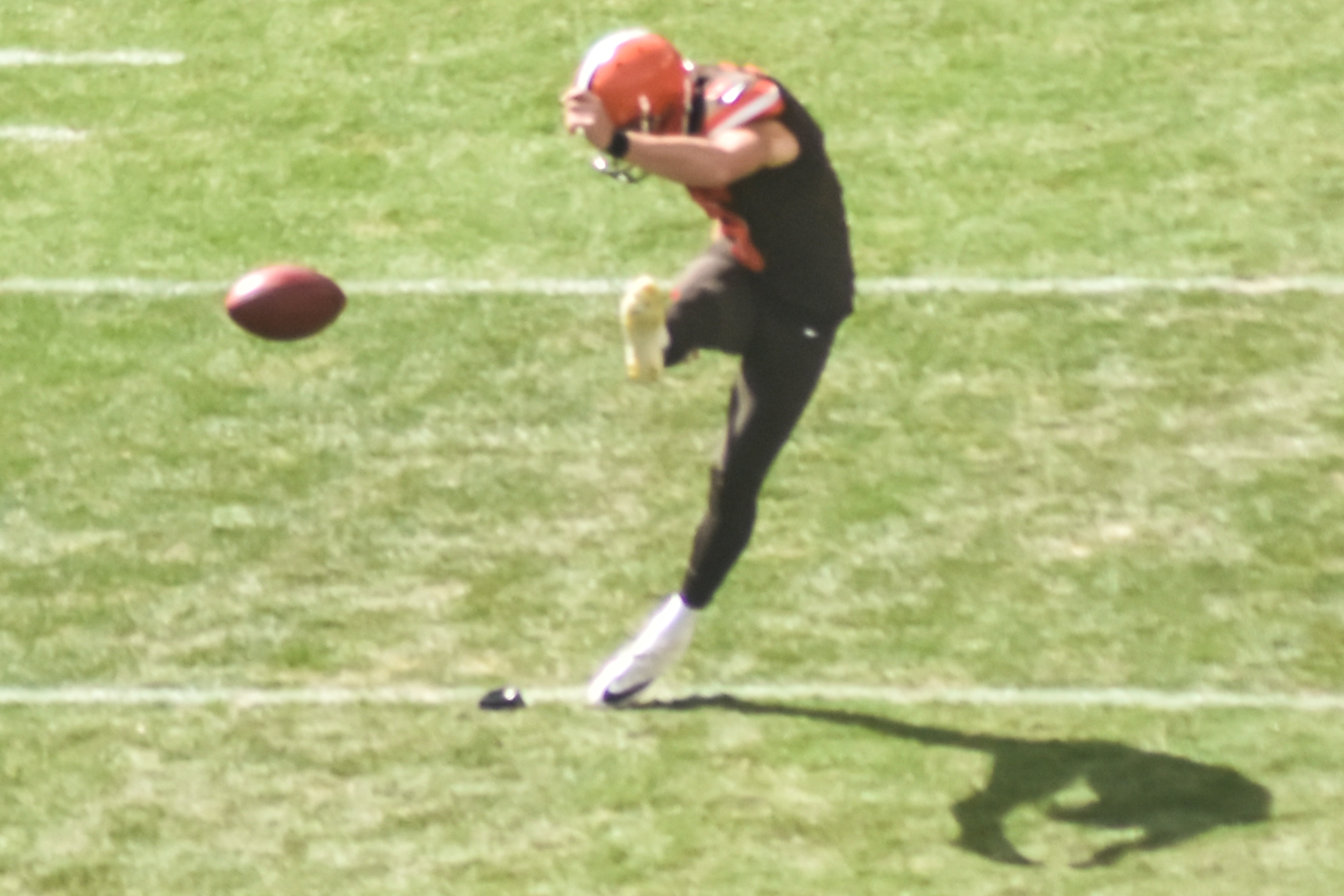
- Coons with the Cleveland Browns in 2015

No. 4, 6, 5
- Position: Placekicker

Personal information
- Born: February 6, 1992 (age 34); Alta Loma, California, U.S.
- Listed height: 6 ft 1 in (1.85 m)
- Listed weight: 200 lb (91 kg)

Career information
- High school: Alta Loma (Rancho Cucamonga, California)
- College: Mt. San Antonio (2010–2011); Washington (2012–2013)
- NFL draft: 2014: undrafted

Career history
- Tennessee Titans (2014)*; Cleveland Browns (2015); Los Angeles Rams (2017)*; Los Angeles Chargers (2017)
- * Offseason or practice squad member only

Awards and highlights
- Second-team All-Pac-12 (2013)

Career NFL statistics
- Field goals made: 35
- Field goals attempted: 40
- Field goal %: 87.5%
- Longest field goal: 47
- Stats at Pro Football Reference

Travis Charles Coons (born February 6, 1992) is an American former professional football player who was a placekicker in the National Football League (NFL). He played college football for the Washington Huskies. He was a member of the Tennessee Titans, Cleveland Browns, Los Angeles Rams, and Los Angeles Chargers.

== Early life ==
Coons attended Alta Loma High School, where he played football for the Braves. On defense, he played safety. On offense, he played wide receiver. Also, he kicked for the team. While in high school, he played soccer in addition to football.

== College career ==
Coons played in 26 career games in two years at the University of Washington. He was named second-team All-Pac-12 as a punter and honorable mention All-Pac-12 as a kicker in his final year as he connected on 24-of-30 career field goal attempts (80.0 percent) and averaged 40.1 yards on 116 punts. At the University of Washington, he majored in American Ethnic Studies.

Prior to his two years at Washington, spent two years at Mt. San Antonio College and helped the Mounties to a 10–2 overall record, the Southern California championship, and a trip to the California state title game.

== Professional career ==
=== Tennessee Titans ===
Following the 2014 NFL draft, Coons was signed by the Tennessee Titans. On September 1, 2014, he was waived by the team before the start of the 2014 season.

=== Cleveland Browns ===
On December 30, 2014, Coons signed with the Cleveland Browns. During the 2015 preseason, Coons beat out Carey Spear for the starting kicker job. On September 20, 2015, against the Tennessee Titans, Coons kicked a season and career-high four extra points. On October 4, 2015, against the San Diego Chargers, Coons kicked a season and career-high four field goals. On October 11, 2015, against the Baltimore Ravens, Coons kicked four field goals, including the game-winner to win 33–30 in overtime. In a loss to Baltimore a month and a half later, Coons set an NFL record when he recorded his 18th consecutive field goal to start his professional career. His most noticeable kick of the game, however, was one that was blocked by Brent Urban and returned for the game-winning touchdown by Will Hill. On January 3, 2015, against the Pittsburgh Steelers in Week 17, Coons kicked four field goals, which was the Browns' only points in the 28–12 loss.

Coons kicked 28 field goals on 32 attempts in the 2015 season. As of 2016, this was the fourth most in a single season in Cleveland Browns history, only behind Phil Dawson (30 in 2008 and 29 in 2012) and Matt Stover (29 in 1995).

Coons was released by the Browns on August 29, 2016, after losing the kicking competition to Patrick Murray.

=== Los Angeles Rams ===
On August 10, 2017, Coons signed with the Los Angeles Rams. He was waived on August 28, 2017, to create a roster spot so that Eric Dickerson could sign a one-day contract to retire as a member of the Rams. Coons was re-signed by the Rams on August 30, 2017. He was waived again on September 2, 2017.

=== Los Angeles Chargers ===
On November 30, 2017, Coons was signed to the Los Angeles Chargers' practice squad as insurance to the injured Nick Novak. He was promoted to the active roster two days later after Novak was placed on injured reserve. On December 3, Coons made his Chargers debut going 4 for 5 and making his lone extra point attempt. His four field goals set a Chargers record for most field goals in a debut. On December 18, 2017, Coons was waived by the Chargers after the team claimed Nick Rose off waivers.

== See also ==
- Washington Huskies football statistical leaders
