= Will Hill =

American gridiron football player (born 1990)

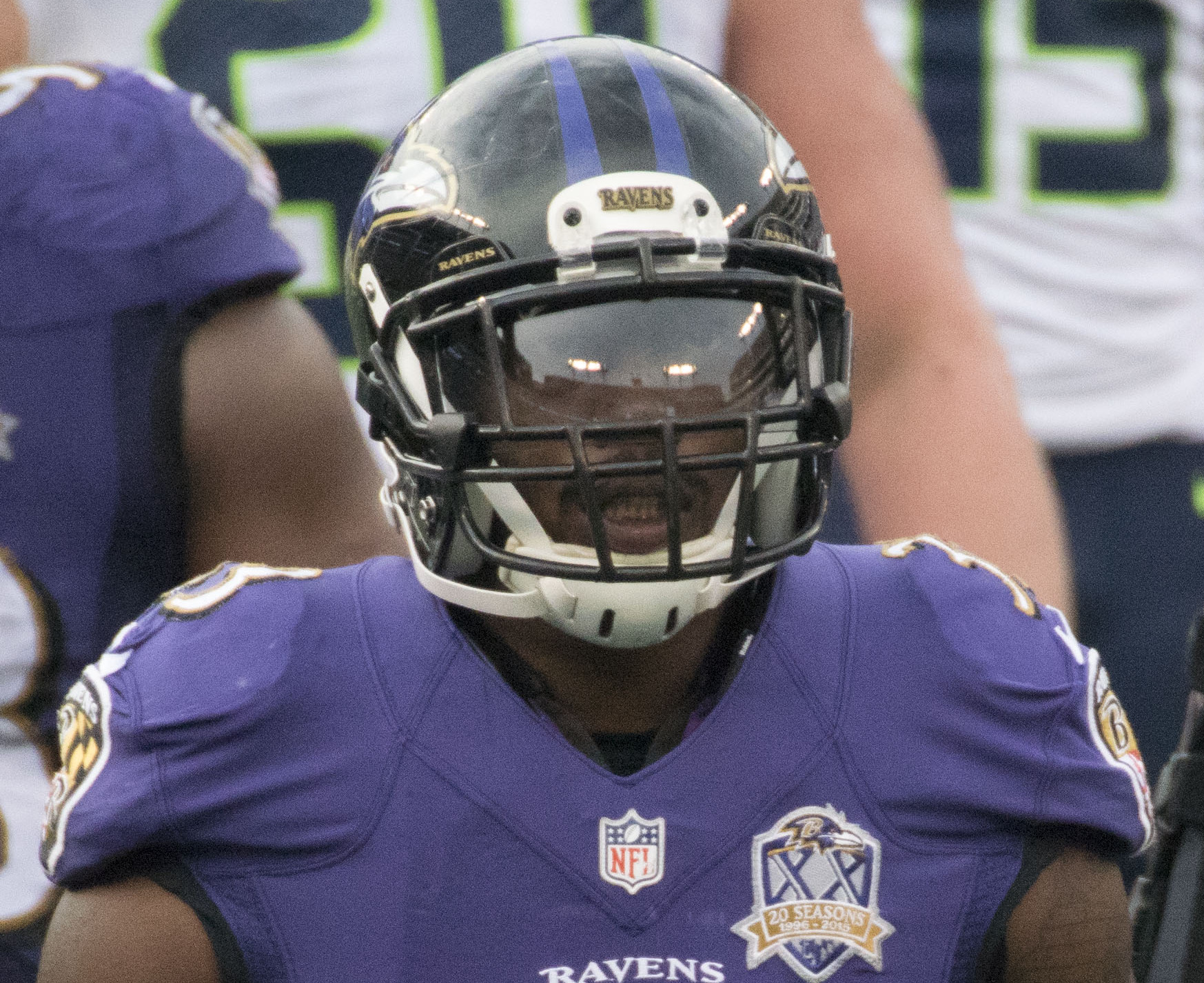
- Hill with the Baltimore Ravens in 2015

Profile
- Position: Safety

Personal information
- Born: March 7, 1990 (age 36); East Orange, New Jersey, U.S.
- Listed height: 6 ft 3 in (1.91 m)
- Listed weight: 215 lb (98 kg)

Career information
- High school: St. Peter's Preparatory School (Jersey City, New Jersey)
- College: Florida
- NFL draft: 2011: undrafted

Career history
- Arizona Rattlers (2012)*; New York Giants (2012–2013); Baltimore Ravens (2014–2015); Hamilton Tiger-Cats (2017); Orlando Apollos (2019); St. Louis BattleHawks (2020); Arlington Renegades (2023)
- * Offseason or practice squad member only

Awards and highlights
- XFL champion (2023); Mid-season All-XFL (2020); BCS national champion (2009); SEC All-Freshman Team (2008)

Career NFL statistics
- Total tackles: 221
- Sacks: 1
- Forced fumbles: 3
- Fumble recoveries: 2
- Interceptions: 4
- Total touchdowns: 3
- Stats at Pro Football Reference
- Stats at CFL.ca

Will Hill III (born March 7, 1990) is an American professional football safety. He played college football for the University of Florida and was a member of Florida's 2009 BCS National Championship team. He was signed as an undrafted free agent by the New York Giants in 2012, and has also played for the Baltimore Ravens of the National Football League (NFL) from 2014 to 2015. He was also a member of the Arizona Rattlers of the Arena Football League (AFL), the Hamilton Tiger-Cats of the Canadian Football League (CFL), the Orlando Apollos of the Alliance of American Football (AAF), and the St. Louis BattleHawks and Arlington Renegades of the XFL.

== Early life ==
Hill was born and raised in East Orange, New Jersey. He attended St. Peter's Preparatory School in Jersey City, New Jersey. At St. Peter's Preparatory School, he was a two-sport athlete in football and track. In football, he played receiver, quarterback, running back, and safety in his junior year. He ran for 682 yards from both running back and quarterback positions and threw for 758 yards. He had three interceptions and 68 tackles playing free safety and had 444 yards receiving. As a senior, Hill had 947 yards passing and seven touchdowns, he rushed for 960 yards and 19 touchdowns and had 43 tackles, four interceptions, and three pass breakups on defense. He was a first team all-state selection. He was the 2007 New Jersey Offensive Player of the Year.

In track and field, Hill competed as a sprinter. He recorded a personal-best time of 52.9 seconds in the 400-meter dash as a freshman. In addition, he also ran a 4.4-second 40-yard dash as a senior.

Following his high school senior season, Rivals.com, ESPN, and Scout.com all rated Hill as the top high school safety in the nation. ESPN rated him as the second overall football prospect and the top-ranked overall athlete in the nation. Rivals rated Hill tenth and Scout rated him sixth among all college football recruits.

== College career ==
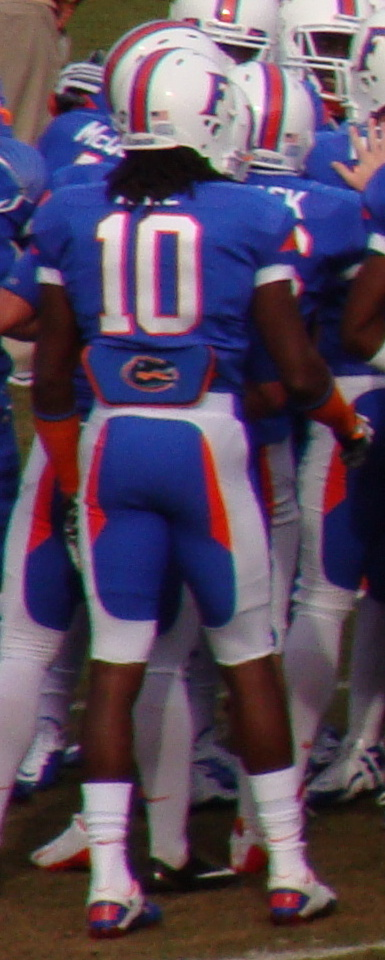
Hill with the Florida Gators in 2009

Hill accepted an athletic scholarship to attend the University of Florida, where he played for coach Urban Meyer's Florida Gators football team from 2008 to 2010. As a free safety and special teams contributor, he was chosen to be on the 2008 SEC Football All-Freshman Team. Hill compiled 48 tackles and two interceptions as a freshman for the Gators. He recorded the first tackle of the 2009 BCS Championship Game, in which the Gators defeated the Oklahoma Sooners by a score of 24–14.

== Professional career ==
Pre-draft measurables
Height	Weight	40-yard dash	10-yard split	20-yard split	20-yard shuttle	Three-cone drill	Vertical jump	Broad jump	Bench press
6 ft 1 in (1.85 m)	202 lb (92 kg)	4.63 s	1.56 s	2.69 s	4.19 s	6.94 s	34 1/2 in (0.88 m)	10 ft 5 in (3.18 m)	13 reps
All values from NFL Combine and Pro Day

=== Arizona Rattlers ===
Hill was not selected in the 2011 NFL draft. In September 2011, he signed with the Arizona Rattlers of the Arena Football League (AFL) for the 2012 AFL season. He was placed on refuse to report on February 18, 2012.

=== New York Giants ===
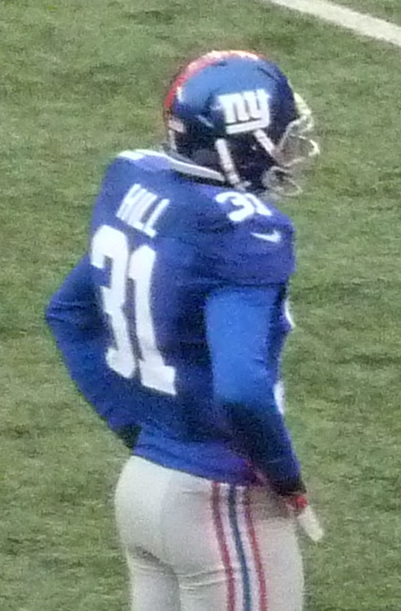
Hill with the New York Giants in 2012

On May 14, 2012, Hill was signed by the New York Giants. He was eventually activated to their active roster. On June 2, 2014, Hill was waived by the Giants.

=== Baltimore Ravens ===
It was reported on July 25, 2014 that the Baltimore Ravens signed Hill after former Giants teammate Aaron Ross was injured in training camp and lost for the entire 2014 season. On November 24, 2014, in Week 12 against the New Orleans Saints, Hill intercepted quarterback Drew Brees and returned it 44 yards for a touchdown. The Ravens won 34–27.

On August 27, 2015, the Ravens signed him to a two-year contract extension worth roughly $7 million. On November 30, 2015, in Week 12, Hill recovered a potential game-winning field goal blocked by defensive end Brent Urban as time expired and returned it for a game-winning touchdown against the Cleveland Browns. Hill was named the AFC Special Teams Player of the Week in recognition of his successful performance.

On March 16, 2016, the Ravens released Hill upon learning that he had failed a drug test and would be suspended ten games.

=== Hamilton Tiger-Cats ===
On May 9, 2017, Hill signed with the Hamilton Tiger-Cats of the Canadian Football League (CFL). In the season opening loss to the Toronto Argonauts, Hill blocked a pair of field goals, one of which was returned for a touchdown by teammate Richard Leonard. In his second game with the team, Hill was ejected for grabbing a referee by his uniform after disputing a call on the field. He was subsequently suspended for one game by the league. Hill was also issued a fine for punching a Saskatchewan player in a separate incident on the same play. On August 10, 2017 Hill was released by the Tiger-Cats who were 0–6 at the time, citing character concerns. Hill appeared in 5 games for the Ti-Cats and contributed 25 defensive tackles, one tackle on special teams, one quarterback sack, and two blocked field goals.

=== Orlando Apollos ===
In 2018, Hill signed with the Orlando Apollos of the Alliance of American Football for the 2019 season. The league ceased operations in April 2019. In 8 games, Hill made 35 tackles, one sack, and one interception.

=== St. Louis BattleHawks ===
In October 2019, Hill was drafted by the St. Louis BattleHawks in the 2020 XFL draft. During the 5 game shorted season due to the COVID-19 pandemic, Hill had 33 tackles and 2 interceptions. Hill was named to both the XFL mid-season awards, and was rated as one of the top graded defensive backs by Pro Football Focus. He had his contract terminated when the league suspended operations on April 10, 2020.

=== Arlington Renegades ===
On November 16, 2022, Hill was drafted by the Arlington Renegades in the 2022 XFL Draft. He was drafted 22nd overall in the Defensive Backs phase of the draft. He was not part of the roster after the 2024 UFL dispersal draft on January 15, 2024.
