= 2015 NFL season =

American football season

- For the 2015 season, a gold-plated NFL logo was used across all league properties in anticipation of the 50th Super Bowl game.

Regular season
- Duration: September 10, 2015 – January 3, 2016

Playoffs
- Start date: January 9, 2016
- AFC Champions: Denver Broncos
- NFC Champions: Carolina Panthers

Super Bowl 50
- Date: February 7, 2016
- Site: Levi's Stadium, Santa Clara, California
- Champions: Denver Broncos

Pro Bowl
- Date: January 31, 2016
- Site: Aloha Stadium, Honolulu, Hawaii

The 2015 NFL season was the 96th season in the history of the National Football League (NFL), and the 50th in the Super Bowl era. To celebrate the 50th season of the Super Bowl, a gold-plated NFL logo and other various gold-themed promotions were used throughout the season. It began on Thursday, September 10, 2015, with the annual kickoff game featuring the defending Super Bowl XLIX champion New England Patriots defeating the Pittsburgh Steelers. The season concluded with Super Bowl 50, the league's championship game, on Sunday, February 7, 2016, at Levi's Stadium in Santa Clara, California, with the Denver Broncos defeating the Carolina Panthers 24–10.

During the 2015 season, the Oakland Raiders, the St. Louis Rams, and the San Diego Chargers announced their intentions to relocate back to Los Angeles in the ensuing off-season (all three teams had previously resided in the city at various points in their history). NFL owners eventually only approved the relocation of the Rams, by a vote of 30–2 on January 12, 2016. Thus, 2015 ended up being the Rams' last season in St. Louis.

== Player movement ==
The 2015 NFL League Year began on Tuesday, March 10, 2015, at 4:00 p.m. ET. On Saturday, March 7, clubs started to contact and enter into contract negotiations with the certified agents of players who became unrestricted free agents upon the expiration of their 2014 contracts at 4:00 p.m. ET on March 10. On Tuesday, March 10, 2015, clubs exercised options for 2015 on all players who have option clauses in their 2014 contracts, submitted qualifying offers to their restricted free agents with expiring contracts and to whom they desire to retain a Right of First Refusal/Compensation, submitted a Minimum Salary Tender to retain exclusive negotiating rights to their players with expiring 2014 contracts and who have fewer than three accrued seasons of free agency credit, "Top-51" began, all clubs must be under the 2015 salary cap, all 2014 player contracts expired at 4:00 p.m. ET and trading period for 2015 began. (4:00 p.m. ET).

This season's salary cap increased to $143.28 million per team, up from $133 million in 2014.

=== Free agency ===
A total of 453 players were eligible for some form of free agency at the beginning of the free agency period. Among the players who changed teams via free agency included:

- Quarterbacks Brian Hoyer (Cleveland to Houston) and Josh McCown (Tampa Bay to Cleveland).
- Running backs Frank Gore (from San Francisco to Indianapolis), Chris Johnson (from New York Jets to Arizona), Ryan Mathews (from San Diego to Philadelphia), DeMarco Murray (from Dallas to Philadelphia), and Shane Vereen (New England to New York Giants)
- Wide receivers Dwayne Bowe (Kansas City to Cleveland), Michael Crabtree, Andre Johnson (Houston to Indianapolis), Jeremy Maclin (Philadelphia to Kansas City), Eddie Royal (San Diego to Chicago), and Torrey Smith (Baltimore to San Francisco),
- Tight ends Jordan Cameron (Cleveland to Miami), Charles Clay (Miami to Buffalo), Owen Daniels (Baltimore to Denver), Lee Smith (Buffalo to Oakland) and Julius Thomas (Denver to Jacksonville)
- Offensive linemen James Carpenter (Seattle to New York Jets), Orlando Franklin (Denver to San Diego), Rodney Hudson (Kansas City to Oakland), Mike Iupati (San Francisco to Arizona), Jermey Parnell (Dallas to Jacksonville) and Stefen Wisniewski (Oakland to Jacksonville)
- Defensive tackles Nick Fairley (from Detroit to St. Louis), Terrance Knighton (from Denver to Washington), Jared Odrick (Miami to Jacksonville, Stephen Paea (Chicago to Washington), Ndamukong Suh (Detroit to Miami), Vince Wilfork (New England to Houston); and Dan Williams (Arizona to Oakland)
- Defensive ends Greg Hardy (Carolina to Dallas), Michael Johnson (Tampa Bay to Cincinnati), Pernell McPhee (Baltimore to Chicago), Jabaal Sheard (Cleveland to New England) and Brian Orakpo (Washington to Tennessee),
- Linebackers Bruce Carter (Dallas to Tampa Bay), Nate Irving (Denver to Indianapolis)., Brooks Reed (Houston to Atlanta) and Sean Weatherspoon (Atlanta to Arizona)
- Cornerbacks Perrish Cox (San Francisco to Tennessee), Antonio Cromartie (Arizona to New York Jets), Chris Culliver (San Francisco to Washington), Byron Maxwell (Seattle to Philadelphia), Darrelle Revis (New England to New York Jets), Buster Skrine (Cleveland to New York Jets), Cary Williams (Philadelphia to Seattle) and Tramon Williams (Green Bay to Cleveland)
- Safeties Rahim Moore (Denver to Houston), Antrel Rolle (New York Giants to Chicago) and Da'Norris Searcy (Buffalo to Tennessee)

Four players were assigned the non-exclusive franchise tag by their teams, which ensured that the team would receive compensation were the player to sign a contract with another team. These players were wide receivers Dez Bryant (Cowboys) and Demaryius Thomas (Broncos), linebacker Justin Houston (Chiefs), and defensive end Jason Pierre-Paul (Giants). One other team used the transition tag, which offers the player's current team a chance to match offers from other franchises and also guarantees draft pick compensation (at a lesser level than the franchise tag) if a tagged player signs elsewhere. The player given the transition tag was Charles Clay (Dolphins). On March 19, 2015, Clay signed a five-year, $38M contract with the Buffalo Bills, after the Dolphins elected not to match the offer.

=== Trades ===
An unusually large number of big name players switched teams via trade prior to the 2015 season. Eagles coach Chip Kelly used his newly obtained GM powers to make many blockbuster trades. The Philadelphia Eagles traded 2-time All-Pro running back LeSean McCoy to the Buffalo Bills in exchange for linebacker Kiko Alonso. The Eagles also traded Pro Bowl quarterback Nick Foles along with their selection in the second round of the 2016 NFL draft to the St. Louis Rams for quarterback Sam Bradford; the deal also included a swap of draft picks in the 2015 NFL draft as well as a possible additional 2016 draft pick from the Rams contingent on Bradford's playing time with the Eagles. The New Orleans Saints traded All-Pro tight end Jimmy Graham along with their fourth-round selection in the draft to the Seattle Seahawks in exchange for All-Pro center Max Unger and the Seahawks' first-round selection in the draft. The Saints also traded away Pro Bowl guard Ben Grubbs (to the Kansas City Chiefs for a fifth round selection in the 2015 NFL draft) and wide receiver Kenny Stills (to the Miami Dolphins in exchange for linebacker Dannell Ellerbe and a third rounder in the 2015 draft). The Detroit Lions acquired All-Pro defensive tackle Haloti Ngata from the Baltimore Ravens in exchange for draft picks to help make up for the loss of Ndamukong Suh in free agency.

=== Draft ===
The 2015 NFL draft was held April 30 – May 2, 2015, in Chicago. The draft process began with the NFL Scouting Combine, where draft-eligible players were evaluated by team personnel, which was held in Indianapolis on February 17–23. On October 2, 2014, Auditorium Theatre in Chicago was announced as the official site of the draft. The previous fifty NFL drafts (since 1965) had been held in New York. The 2015 NFL draft was the first to feature an outdoor component, where fans would be able to see the Commissioner on the Auditorium Theatre stage from across the street in Grant Park; this area was called Draft Town. In the draft, the Tampa Bay Buccaneers made Florida State University quarterback Jameis Winston the first overall selection.

== New officials ==
Referee Bill Leavy retired after the 2014 season. On May 13, 2015, the NFL promoted line judge John Hussey to the referee position. In addition to Hussey's promotion to referee, the NFL hired 10 more officials, including the first full-time female official in NFL history, Sarah Thomas, who worked as a line judge, (Note: Shannon Eastin was the first woman to officiate an NFL game as a temporary non-union official during the 2012 NFL referee lockout.) as well as Walt Coleman IV, the son of referee Walt Coleman, who worked as a side judge.

== Rule changes ==
The following rule changes were passed for the 2015 NFL season at the owners' meeting on March 25, 2015:

- Allow a certified medical trainer to call a medical time-out when a player appears disoriented or concussed. This time-out is not to be charged to the team whose player is injured, even inside the two-minute warning. The only substitution allowed is for the injured player and for a single player from the opposing team to match up.
- Making the practice of a receiver declared ineligible lining up in the slot formation illegal; ineligible receivers must line up inside the tackle box. This was in response to the New England Patriots using this tactic in the 2014–15 NFL playoffs against the Baltimore Ravens.
- Extended the restriction for peel-back blocks to include all of the offensive team instead of just those inside of the tackle box.
- Expanded the definition of a "defenseless receiver" to include intended receivers in the air during and after an interception.
- Making offensive backs who chop a defender engaged above the waist by another offensive player subject to a chop-block penalty (15 yards).
- Pushing teammates at the scrimmage line during punts or field goals is illegal.
- Expanded instant replay to include whether time should be put back on the game clock at the end of any period.
- The league's jersey numbering system was modified to allow linebackers to wear numbers 40–49, in addition to 50–59 and 90–99.
- The 'process' rule on making a catch while going to the ground is adjusted. A receiver will be considered to have made a catch if they "clearly establish themselves as a runner" before going to the ground. Previously a receiver had to make a "football move".

The following changes to the extra point rules were passed for the 2015 NFL season at the owners' meeting on May 19, 2015:

- The line of scrimmage for extra point tries will move to the 15-yard line from the two-yard line. Two-point conversions will still be spotted at the two-yard line.
- Defenses will be allowed to return turnovers on two-point tries or blocked or missed PAT kicks to the opposing end zone for two points, mirroring the NCAA College football rule adopted in the 1988 season. Furthermore, a one-point safety can now also be scored if either team takes possession and fumbles out of their own end zone or is tackled in it after leaving it.

The following changes to game ball protocol were passed for the 2015 NFL season on July 27, 2015:

- There will be increased testing, oversight and security surrounding the balls. At random games, officials will measure the PSI of 24 footballs at halftime. Two officials, instead of only the referee, will measure and record the inflation of footballs before the game. These changes were made in response to the "deflategate" scandal.

== 2015 deaths ==
The following people associated with the NFL (or AFL) died in 2015.

Frank Gifford

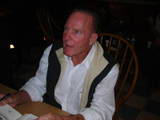
Gifford in 2009

Frank Gifford died on August 9, just a week shy of his 85th birthday. Gifford had a 12-year playing career with the New York Giants in the 1950s and 1960s. He was a 4-time All-Pro, played in eight Pro Bowls and was named to the 1950s All-Decade Team. In 1956 Gifford was named the NFL's Most Valuable Player. After his playing career Gifford transitioned to sports broadcasting, most notably joining ABC's Monday Night Football in the program's second season and serving as the broadcast's play-by-play announcer and later color commentator for the next 27 seasons. Gifford was a member of the Pro Football Hall of Fame as well as the College Football Hall of Fame.

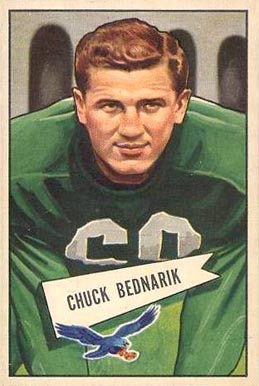
Bednarik in 1952

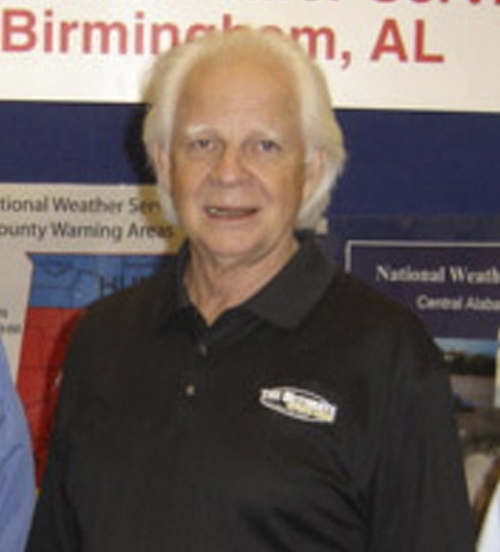
Stabler in 2007

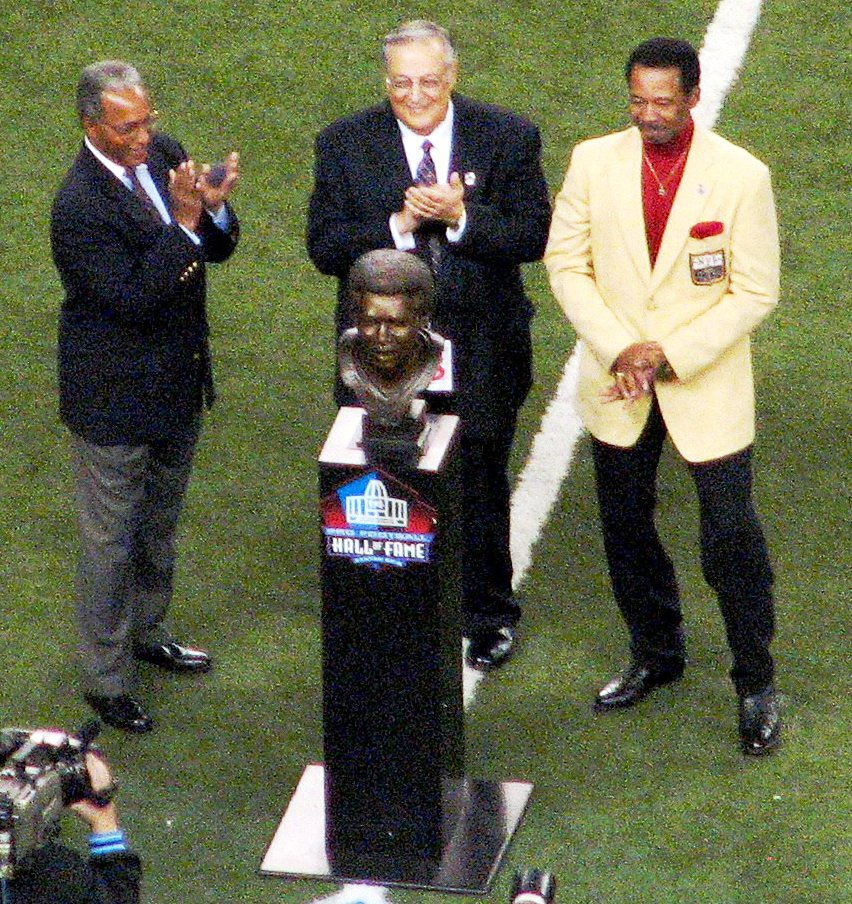
Sanders (far right) in 2007

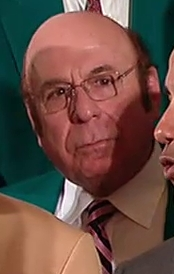
Yepremian in 2013

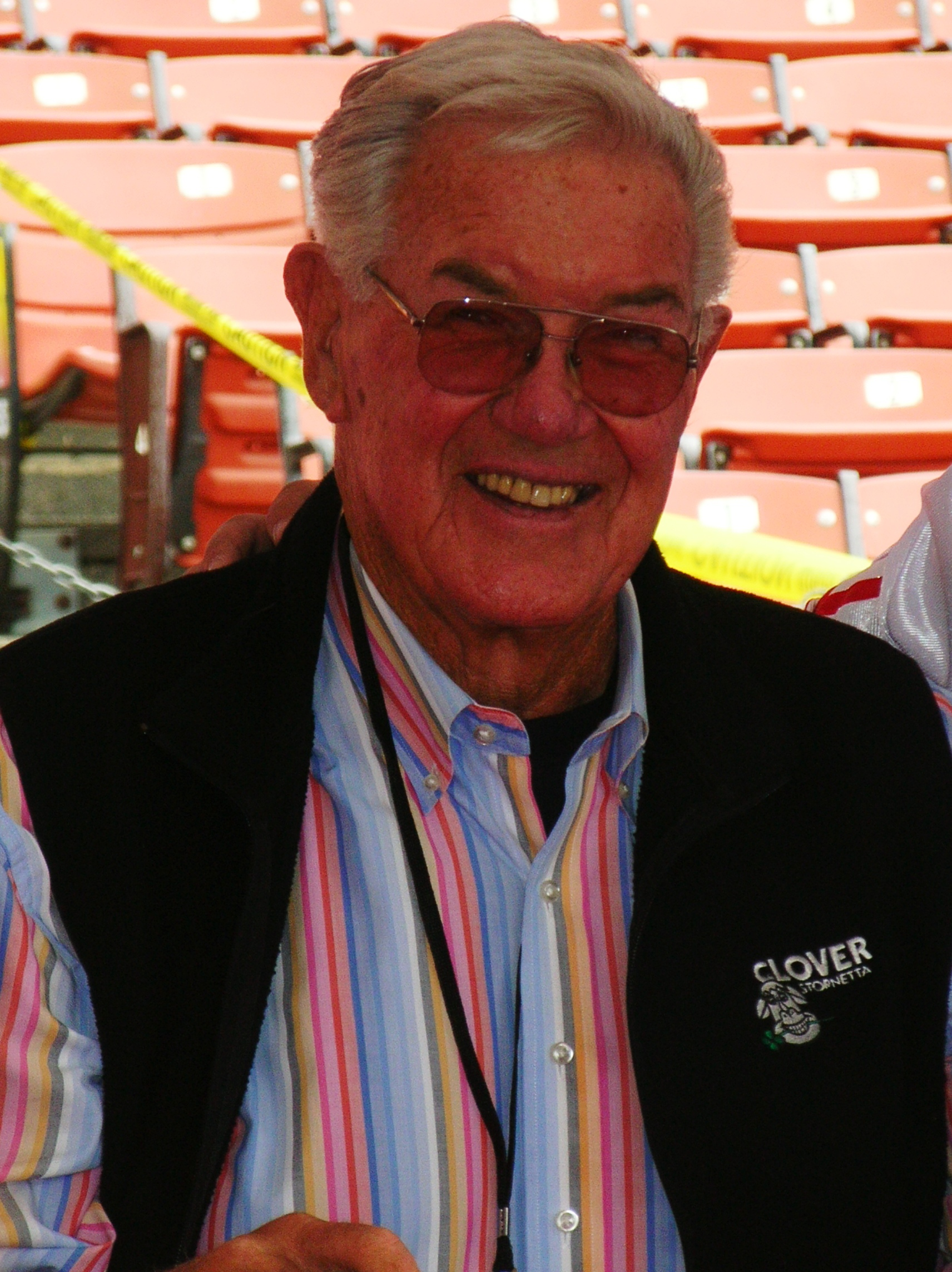
St. Clair in 2009

Chuck Bednarik

Chuck Bednarik died on March 31 at age 89. Bednarik was the first player selected in the 1949 NFL draft and played linebacker and center for the Philadelphia Eagles for fourteen seasons. He won championships with the Eagles in 1949 and 1960. He was a 5-time first team All-Pro and played in eight Pro Bowls. Bednarik was selected as a member of the NFL's 75th Anniversary All-Time Two-Way Team and was inducted into the Pro Football Hall of Fame in his first year of eligibility in 1967. He was also a member of the College Football Hall of Fame.

Ken Stabler

Ken Stabler died on July 8 at age 69. Stabler had a fifteen-year NFL career as a quarterback for the Oakland Raiders, Houston Oilers and New Orleans Saints in the 1970s and 1980s. He was named the league's MVP in 1974, led the Raiders to their first championship in Super Bowl XI and was a member of the 1970s All-Decade Team.

Ed Sabol

Ed Sabol died on February 9 at age 98. Sabol founded NFL Films in 1962 where he pioneered a documentary style of capturing the game of football that many credit as a driver of the huge surge in the NFL's popularity. Sabol was enshrined in the Pro Football Hall of Fame in 2011.

Charlie Sanders

Charlie Sanders died on July 2 at age 68. Sanders played tight end for the Detroit Lions for ten seasons. He was twice named first-team All-Pro, was selected for seven Pro Bowl teams and was a member of the 1970s All-Decade Team. After his playing career he continued to be involved with the Lions, first as a broadcaster and later as a coach and scout. He was elected to the Pro Football Hall of Fame in 2007.

Garo Yepremian

Garo Yepremian died on May 15 at age 70. Yepremian had a fourteen-year career as a placekicker for four NFL teams, most notably with the Miami Dolphins of the 1970s. He was twice named a first-team All-Pro and was a member of two Pro Bowl teams as well as a 2-time Super Bowl champion. He led the league in field goal accuracy three times and was named to the 1970s All-Decade Team.

Bob St. Clair

Bob St. Clair died on April 20 at age 84. St. Clair had an eleven-year career as an offensive tackle for the San Francisco 49ers in the 1950s and 1960s. He played in the Pro Bowl five times and was named to the 1950s All-Decade Team. St. Clair was the mayor of Daly City, California from 1958 through 1964. St. Clair was enshrined in the Pro Football Hall of Fame in 1990.

Other 2015 deaths

- Bill Arnsparger
- Pete Athas
- George Atkins
- Billy Baggett
- Monk Bailey
- Tom Bettis
- M. L. Brackett
- C. O. Brocato
- Curtis Brown
- Doug Buffone
- Bryan Caldwell
- Henry Carr
- Sam Cathcart
- Damion Cook
- John David Crow
- Doug Cunningham
- Willie Daniel
- Jack Davis
- JaJuan Dawson
- Clyde Duncan
- Bill Enyart
- Mel Farr
- Jesse Freitas, Jr.
- Ed Fullerton
- Mike Gaechter
- Jim Gaffney
- Gary Glick
- Ray Graves
- Jimmy Gunn
- Rip Hawkins
- Dick Hensley
- Gary Henson
- Ray Hill
- Gordy Holz, Marv Hubbard
- Tommy Hudspeth
- Kevin Hunt
- Lindy Infante
- Bill Jessup
- Sonny Karnofsky
- Bill Keating
- Vince Kendrick
- Mike Kostiuk
- Jim LaRue
- Eddie LeBaron
- Dan Lewis
- Jack Linn
- Tom Longo
- Don Looney
- Ann Mara
- Tommy Mason
- Jim McCusker
- Ralph McGill
- Steve Meilinger
- John Mellekas
- Terdell Middleton
- Ed Modzelewski
- Jim Mutscheller
- Ray Nagel
- Joe O'Malley
- John Papit
- Pat Peppler
- Jim Phillips
- John Polonchek
- Art Powell
- Bob Priestley
- Steve Pritko
- Jethro Pugh
- Mike Pyle
- Lee Remmel
- Adrian Robinson
- William Roffler
- Tyler Sash
- Tom Scott
- Allie Sherman
- John Siegal
- Joe Skibinski
- J. D. Smith
- Robert Sowell
- Dick Stanfel
- Jim Steffen
- Charlie Sumner
- Rich Szaro
- Bob Toneff
- Laverne Torczon
- LaVern Torgeson
- Bobby Towns
- Ted Vaught
- Danny Villanueva
- Jerry Wilson
- Dick Wood

== Preseason ==
Training camps for the 2015 season began July 22 and continued through the end of preseason, September 3. The normal training camp window ran from late July to late August or early September. Most of the camps had rookies report first, then veterans. At that point, some teams practiced versus another organization, like the Bills practiced against the Browns this year. Teams started training camp no earlier than fifteen days before the team's first scheduled preseason game. At that point, the rosters for each team were open to 90 players. Those rosters were cut to 75 by Week 3 of preseason, and the final 53-man roster was submitted at the end of preseason.

Prior to the start of the regular season, each team played at least four exhibition games. The preseason schedule got underway with the Pro Football Hall of Fame Game on Sunday evening, August 9. The Hall of Fame game is a traditional part of the annual Pro Football Hall of Fame induction weekend celebrating new Hall of Fame members. It was played at Tom Benson Hall of Fame Stadium which is located adjacent to the Hall of Fame building in Canton, Ohio. The game, which was televised in the U.S. on NBC, featured the Minnesota Vikings and Pittsburgh Steelers; as in previous years, each team had an inductee in the class of 2015 (Mick Tingelhoff for the Vikings, Jerome Bettis for the Steelers). The 65-game preseason schedule ended on Thursday, September 3, a week before the start of the regular season, with each team having played four preseason games, except for the Steelers and Vikings, who played five games. The preliminary preseason schedule was released Thursday, April 9.

== Regular season ==
The 2015 regular season featured 256 games played out over a seventeen-week schedule which began on the Thursday night following Labor Day. Each of the league's 32 teams played a 16-game schedule with one bye week for each team scheduled between weeks four and eleven. The slate also featured seventeen games on Monday night, two of which were played at the end of the first week of the regular season. Additionally, there was no Monday Night game at the end of the final week of the regular season, the same as in previous years. There were games played on Thursday, including the opening game of the regular season on Thursday, September 10 and three games on Thanksgiving Day. The regular season concluded with a full slate of 16 games on Sunday, January 3, all of which were intra-divisional matchups, as it has been since 2010, with the Minnesota Vikings beating the Green Bay Packers on NBC Sunday Night Football

Scheduling formula

Under the NFL's scheduling formula, each team plays each of the other three teams in their own division twice (one home and one away). In addition, a team plays against all four teams in one other division within the conference, on a 3-year rotation; and one division from the opposite conference, on a 4-year rotation. Two games on a team's schedule are against the two teams in the team's own conference in the divisions the team was not set to play who finished the previous season in the same rank in their division (e.g. the team which finished first in its division the previous season would play each other team in their conference that also finished first in its respective division). The pre-set division pairings for 2015 are as follows:

Intra-conference
AFC East vs. AFC South
AFC North vs. AFC West
NFC East vs. NFC South
NFC North vs. NFC West

Inter-conference
AFC East vs. NFC East
AFC West vs. NFC North
AFC North vs. NFC West
AFC South vs. NFC South

Highlights of the 2015 schedule include:

- NFL Kickoff Game: The 2015 season began on Thursday, September 10, 2015, with the Super Bowl XLIX champion New England hosting Pittsburgh. The Patriots defeated the Steelers, 28–21.
- International Series: Three games were played at Wembley Stadium in London, United Kingdom in 2015, with two games being played in back-to-back weeks for the first time. Miami played the New York Jets on Sunday, October 4, the first ever divisional game played in the International Series. The Jacksonville then hosted the Buffalo on Sunday, October 25, in the third of four consecutive home games for the Jaguars in the International Series. Finally, the Kansas City hosted the Detroit on Sunday, November 1, making 2015 the Lions' second consecutive year in the International Series. All three games began at 9:30 a.m. ET.
- Thanksgiving Day games: These games occurred on Thursday, November 26, 2015. For the second consecutive season, the AFC was shut out of Thanksgiving, with all six slots going to NFC teams. As usual, three consecutive games were played; the Detroit hosted the Philadelphia in the early slot on Fox and the Dallas hosted the Carolina in the middle slot on CBS; this was the Panthers' first ever Thanksgiving appearance. The Green Bay hosted the Chicago in the primetime game, where the Packers retired longtime quarterback Brett Favre's No. 4 jersey.
- Christmas: The Oakland hosted the San Diego at 8:25 p.m. EST (5:25 p.m. local time) on December 24, Christmas Eve. This was the second ever night game on Christmas Eve (the first was in 2007, which was also played in the Pacific Time Zone) and the first time the league has played on a Thursday Christmas Eve. The league has traditionally avoided playing night games on Christmas Eve and, in years past, moved games that would usually play on the night of Christmas Eve to another day of the week, an option the league did not exercise in 2015; no games were held on Christmas Day, which fell on a Friday, in 2015 as the NFL rarely plays games on that day of the week.

=== In-season scheduling changes ===
- Week 10: The Chicago–St. Louis game was "cross-flexed" from Fox to CBS (still at 1:00 p.m. ET).
- Week 11: The Cincinnati–Arizona game, originally scheduled at 4:05 p.m. ET on CBS, was flexed into the 8:30 p.m. ET slot on NBC's Sunday Night Football, in place of the originally scheduled Kansas City–San Diego game, which was moved to 4:05 p.m. ET on CBS. The Green Bay–Minnesota game, originally scheduled at 1:00 p.m. ET, was moved to 4:25 p.m. ET (still on Fox).
- Week 13: The Carolina–New Orleans game, originally scheduled at 1:00 p.m. ET, was moved to 4:25 p.m. ET (still on Fox), while the Cincinnati–Cleveland game was "cross-flexed" from CBS to Fox (still at 1:00 p.m. ET).
- Week 14: The New England–Houston game, originally scheduled at 1:00 p.m. ET on CBS, was flexed into the 8:30 p.m. ET slot on NBC's Sunday Night Football, in place of the originally scheduled Seattle–Baltimore game, which was moved to 1:00 p.m. ET on Fox.
- Week 15: The Arizona–Philadelphia game, originally scheduled at 1:00 p.m. ET on Fox, was flexed into the 8:30 p.m. ET slot on NBC's Sunday Night Football, in place of the originally scheduled Cincinnati–San Francisco game, which was moved to 4:25 p.m. ET on CBS, while the Buffalo–Washington game was "cross-flexed" from CBS to Fox (still at 1:00 p.m. ET).
- Week 16: The New York Giants–Minnesota game, originally scheduled at 1:00 p.m. ET on Fox, was flexed into the 8:30 p.m. ET slot on NBC's Sunday Night Football, in place of the originally scheduled Pittsburgh–Baltimore game, which was moved to 1:00 p.m. ET on CBS, while the Indianapolis–Miami game was "cross-flexed" from CBS to Fox (still at 1:00 p.m. ET). In addition, the Jacksonville-New Orleans game was moved from 1:00 p.m. ET to 4:05 p.m. ET (still on CBS).
- Week 17:
  - The Minnesota–Green Bay game, originally scheduled at 1:00 p.m. ET on Fox, was selected as the final 8:30 p.m. ET NBC Sunday Night Football game of the season, which decided the NFC North division champion.
  - The Baltimore–Cincinnati game, originally scheduled at 1:00 p.m. ET on CBS, was "cross-flexed" to Fox (keeping the same kickoff time).
  - The Tampa Bay–Carolina game, originally scheduled at 1:00 p.m. ET on Fox, was moved to 4:25 p.m. ET (still on Fox).
  - The Oakland–Kansas City game, originally scheduled at 1:00 p.m. ET on CBS, was "cross-flexed" to 4:25 p.m. ET on Fox.
  - The St. Louis–San Francisco game, originally scheduled at 4:25 p.m. ET on Fox, was "cross-flexed" to CBS (keeping the same kickoff time).

== Regular season standings ==
=== Division ===
AFC East
	W	L	T	PCT	DIV	CONF	PF	PA	STK
^{(2)} New England Patriots	12	4	0	.750	4–2	9–3	465	315	L2
New York Jets	10	6	0	.625	3–3	7–5	387	314	L1
Buffalo Bills	8	8	0	.500	4–2	7–5	379	359	W2
Miami Dolphins	6	10	0	.375	1–5	4–8	310	389	W1

AFC North
	W	L	T	PCT	DIV	CONF	PF	PA	STK
^{(3)} Cincinnati Bengals	12	4	0	.750	5–1	9–3	419	279	W1
^{(6)} Pittsburgh Steelers	10	6	0	.625	3–3	7–5	423	319	W1
Baltimore Ravens	5	11	0	.313	3–3	4–8	328	401	L1
Cleveland Browns	3	13	0	.188	1–5	2–10	278	432	L3

AFC South
	W	L	T	PCT	DIV	CONF	PF	PA	STK
^{(4)} Houston Texans	9	7	0	.563	5–1	7–5	339	313	W3
Indianapolis Colts	8	8	0	.500	4–2	6–6	333	408	W2
Jacksonville Jaguars	5	11	0	.313	2–4	5–7	376	448	L3
Tennessee Titans	3	13	0	.188	1–5	1–11	299	423	L4

AFC West
	W	L	T	PCT	DIV	CONF	PF	PA	STK
^{(1)} Denver Broncos	12	4	0	.750	4–2	8–4	355	296	W2
^{(5)} Kansas City Chiefs	11	5	0	.688	5–1	10–2	405	287	W10
Oakland Raiders	7	9	0	.438	3–3	7–5	359	399	L1
San Diego Chargers	4	12	0	.250	0–6	3–9	320	398	L2

NFC East
	W	L	T	PCT	DIV	CONF	PF	PA	STK
^{(4)} Washington Redskins	9	7	0	.563	4–2	8–4	388	379	W4
Philadelphia Eagles	7	9	0	.438	3–3	4–8	377	430	W1
New York Giants	6	10	0	.375	2–4	4–8	420	442	L3
Dallas Cowboys	4	12	0	.250	3–3	3–9	275	374	L4

NFC North
	W	L	T	PCT	DIV	CONF	PF	PA	STK
^{(3)} Minnesota Vikings	11	5	0	.688	5–1	8–4	365	302	W3
^{(5)} Green Bay Packers	10	6	0	.625	3–3	7–5	368	323	L2
Detroit Lions	7	9	0	.438	3–3	6–6	358	400	W3
Chicago Bears	6	10	0	.375	1–5	3–9	335	397	L1

NFC South
	W	L	T	PCT	DIV	CONF	PF	PA	STK
^{(1)} Carolina Panthers	15	1	0	.938	5–1	11–1	500	308	W1
Atlanta Falcons	8	8	0	.500	1–5	5–7	339	345	L1
New Orleans Saints	7	9	0	.438	3–3	5–7	408	476	W2
Tampa Bay Buccaneers	6	10	0	.375	3–3	5–7	342	417	L4

NFC West
	W	L	T	PCT	DIV	CONF	PF	PA	STK
^{(2)} Arizona Cardinals	13	3	0	.813	4–2	10–2	489	313	L1
^{(6)} Seattle Seahawks	10	6	0	.625	3–3	7–5	423	277	W1
St. Louis Rams	7	9	0	.438	4–2	6–6	280	330	L1
San Francisco 49ers	5	11	0	.313	1–5	4–8	238	387	W1

=== Conference ===
AFC
#	Team	Division	W	L	T	PCT	DIV	CONF	SOS	SOV	STK
Division Leaders
1 (Note: Denver finished ahead of New England and Cincinnati for the No. 1 seed based on head-to-head sweep. New England finished ahead of Cincinnati for the No. 2 seed based on record vs. common opponents — New England's cumulative record against Buffalo, Denver, Houston and Pittsburgh was 4–1, while Cincinnati's cumulative record against the same four teams was 2–3.)	Denver Broncos	West	12	4	0	.750	4–2	8–4	.500	.479	W2
2	New England Patriots	East	12	4	0	.750	4–2	9–3	.473	.448	L2
3	Cincinnati Bengals	North	12	4	0	.750	5–1	9–3	.477	.406	W1
4	Houston Texans	South	9	7	0	.563	5–1	7–5	.496	.410	W3
Wild Cards
5	Kansas City Chiefs	West	11	5	0	.688	5–1	10–2	.496	.432	W10
6 (Note: Pittsburgh finished ahead of the New York Jets for the No. 6 seed and qualified for the last playoff spot based on record vs. common opponents — Pittsburgh's cumulative record against Cleveland, Indianapolis, New England and Oakland was 4–1, while the Jets' cumulative record against the same four teams was 3–2.)	Pittsburgh Steelers	North	10	6	0	.625	3–3	7–5	.504	.463	W1
Did not qualify for the postseason
7	New York Jets	East	10	6	0	.625	3–3	7–5	.441	.388	L1
8 (Note: Buffalo finished ahead of Indianapolis based on head-to-head victory.)	Buffalo Bills	East	8	8	0	.500	4–2	7–5	.508	.438	W2
9	Indianapolis Colts	South	8	8	0	.500	4–2	6–6	.500	.406	W2
10	Oakland Raiders	West	7	9	0	.438	3–3	7–5	.512	.366	L1
11	Miami Dolphins	East	6	10	0	.375	1–5	4–8	.469	.469	W2
12 (Note: Jacksonville finished ahead of Baltimore based on head-to-head victory.)	Jacksonville Jaguars	South	5	11	0	.313	2–4	5–7	.473	.375	L3
13	Baltimore Ravens	North	5	11	0	.313	3–3	4–8	.508	.425	L1
14	San Diego Chargers	West	4	12	0	.250	0–6	3–9	.527	.328	L2
15 (Note: Cleveland finished ahead of Tennessee based on head-to-head victory.)	Cleveland Browns	North	3	13	0	.188	1–5	2–10	.531	.271	L3
16	Tennessee Titans	South	3	13	0	.188	1–5	1–11	.492	.375	L4
Tiebreakers (Note: When breaking ties for three or more teams under the NFL's rules, they are first broken within divisions, then comparing only the highest ranked remaining team from each division.)

NFC
#	Team	Division	W	L	T	PCT	DIV	CONF	SOS	SOV	STK
Division Leaders
1	Carolina Panthers	South	15	1	0	.938	5–1	11–1	.441	.438	W1
2	Arizona Cardinals	West	13	3	0	.813	4–2	10–2	.477	.457	L1
3	Minnesota Vikings	North	11	5	0	.688	5–1	8–4	.504	.449	W3
4	Washington Redskins	East	9	7	0	.563	4–2	8–4	.465	.403	W4
Wild Cards
5 (Note: Green Bay finished ahead of Seattle based on head-to-head victory.)	Green Bay Packers	North	10	6	0	.625	3–3	7–5	.531	.450	L2
6	Seattle Seahawks	West	10	6	0	.625	3–3	7–5	.520	.431	W1
Did not qualify for the postseason
7	Atlanta Falcons	South	8	8	0	.500	1–5	5–7	.480	.453	L1
8 (Note: St. Louis and Detroit finished ahead of Philadelphia and New Orleans based on conference record. St. Louis finished ahead of Detroit based on head-to-head victory. Detroit finished ahead of Philadelphia and New Orleans based on head-to-head sweep, while Philadelphia finished ahead of New Orleans based on head-to-head victory.)	St. Louis Rams	West	7	9	0	.438	4–2	6–6	.527	.482	L1
9	Detroit Lions	North	7	9	0	.438	3–3	6–6	.535	.429	W3
10	Philadelphia Eagles	East	7	9	0	.438	3–3	4–8	.508	.473	W1
11	New Orleans Saints	South	7	9	0	.438	3–3	5–7	.504	.402	W2
12 (Note: The New York Giants and Chicago each finished ahead of Tampa Bay based on head-to-head victory, while the Giants finished ahead of Chicago based on conference record.)	New York Giants	East	6	10	0	.375	2–4	4–8	.500	.396	L3
13	Chicago Bears	North	6	10	0	.375	1–5	3–9	.547	.469	L1
14	Tampa Bay Buccaneers	South	6	10	0	.375	3–3	5–7	.484	.406	L4
15	San Francisco 49ers	West	5	11	0	.313	1–5	4–8	.539	.463	W1
16	Dallas Cowboys	East	4	12	0	.250	3–3	3–9	.531	.438	L4
Tiebreakers (Note: When breaking ties for three or more teams under the NFL's rules, they are first broken within divisions, then comparing only the highest-ranked remaining team from each division.)

== Postseason ==
The 2015 playoffs opened with the Wild Card playoff round on the weekend of Saturday, January 9 and Sunday, January 10, 2016, with the winner of each of the games visiting the top two seeded teams in each conference. The Divisional round games were then played on the weekend of Saturday, January 16 and Sunday, January 17, 2016. The Conference championships were held on Sunday, January 24, 2016, with the AFC Championship Game and the NFC Championship Game.

The 2016 Pro Bowl was held on January 31, 2016, at the Aloha Stadium in Honolulu, Hawaii. The game continued the "unconferenced/draft" format that was started in 2014, with Jerry Rice and Michael Irvin serving as the alumni captains. Team Irvin defeated Team Rice 49–27.

Super Bowl 50 decided the 2015 NFL Champion and was played at Levi's Stadium in Santa Clara, California on Sunday, February 7, 2016. Instead of naming it Super Bowl L with Roman numerals like in previous Super Bowls, this game was marketed with the Arabic numeral "50". According to Jaime Weston, the league's vice president of brand and creative, the primary reason was that the league's graphic designers had difficulty designing a suitable, aesthetically pleasing logo with only the Roman numeral "L".

=== Playoffs bracket ===
Jan 10 – FedExField	Jan 16 – University of Phoenix Stadium
5	Green Bay	35
5	Green Bay	20
4	Washington	18	Jan 24 – Bank of America Stadium
2	Arizona	26*
NFC
Jan 10 – TCF Bank Stadium	2	Arizona	15
Jan 17 – Bank of America Stadium
1	Carolina	49
6	Seattle	10	NFC Championship
6	Seattle	24
3	Minnesota	9	Feb 7 – Levi's Stadium
1	Carolina	31
Wild-card round
Divisional round
Jan 9 – NRG Stadium	N1	Carolina	10
Jan 16 – Gillette Stadium
A1	Denver	24
5	Kansas City	30	Super Bowl 50
5	Kansas City	20
4	Houston	0	Jan 24 – Sports Authority Field at Mile High
2	New England	27
AFC
Jan 9 – Paul Brown Stadium	2	New England	18
Jan 17 – Sports Authority Field at Mile High
1	Denver	20
6	Pittsburgh	18	AFC Championship
6	Pittsburgh	16
3	Cincinnati	16
1	Denver	23

* Indicates overtime victory

== Notable events ==
Some NFL-related events that made headlines in 2015 include:

Aftermath of Deflategate scandal

In May, after a lengthy investigation led by Ted Wells, the external investigator appointed by the NFL, the league levied its punishment against the Patriots in the so-called "Deflategate" scandal. The scandal stemmed from the discovery that several of the footballs used by the Patriots during the previous season's AFC championship game were not within the league's inflation guidelines. The Patriots were fined $1 million and stripped of their first-round selection in the 2016 NFL draft and their fourth-round selection in the 2017 NFL draft. Quarterback Tom Brady, who the league's report determined was likely aware of a scheme to manipulate inflation levels, was suspended for four games. Additionally, two locker room attendants employed by the Patriots were suspended indefinitely.

While the team agreed not to appeal the fine and draft pick revocation, Brady appealed his suspension. League commissioner Roger Goodell heard the appeal and confirmed the sentence on July 28. Immediately upon the announcement of the appeal verdict, the league filed suit against the NFL Players Association in civil court in an effort to gain a ruling upholding the punishment. Judge Richard M. Berman pushed the two sides hard to reach a settlement, but when they were unable to he ruled for Brady and the union vacating the suspension imposed by the league. Although the league appealed Judge Berman's ruling, Brady's suspension was lifted clearing the way for him to play in the season opener.

The two Patriots employees, assistant equipment manager John Jastremski and officials locker room attendant Jim McNally, who had previously been suspended by the team were allowed by the league to be reinstated in September. As a condition for the lifting of the suspensions, neither employee is allowed to be involved with the handling or preparation of game balls.

Surprising retirements of several players

A number of relatively young NFL players walked away from the game prior to the 2015 season. The San Francisco 49ers lost three potential starters as linebackers Patrick Willis and Chris Borland and offensive tackle Anthony Davis all announced their retirements. Former Pittsburgh Steelers linebacker Jason Worilds and Tennessee Titans quarterback Jake Locker also both retired despite having yet to reach the age of 30.

Willis, who was regarded as one of the best middle linebackers in the league, played in just six games in 2014 as he dealt with a toe injury. He announced in March his decision to retire at age 30 due to the chronic nature of the foot injuries he had endured in his eight-year career.

Borland led the 49ers with 107 tackles in his rookie season in 2014 despite starting just eight games after being selected in the third round of the 2014 draft. Borland cited concerns over the potential long-term impact to his brain health in continuing to play the game in announcing his retirement which he did in March just days after Willis' announcement.

Davis missed four games in 2014 with his first diagnosed concussion. In announcing his retirement in June, he said that he planned to take "a year or so away from the NFL" to "allow my brain and body a chance to heal."

Worilds was entering free agency after playing for the Steelers the previous five seasons. He turned down contract offers worth tens of millions of dollars in order to devote more time to his Jehovah's Witnesses faith.

Locker played four years for the Titans after they made him the eighth overall selection in 2011 draft. He was a free agent when he announced that he would be retiring because he had lost "the burning desire necessary to play the game for a living."

First female coach and on-field official

The 2015 season marked the hiring of the first female NFL coach and first female NFL on-field official. Jen Welter was hired by the Arizona Cardinals as a coaching intern. Welter worked with the team's inside linebackers through the off-season and pre-season. Welter's internship with the Cardinals expired after the team's third preseason game on August 30.

Sarah Thomas became the NFL's first female on-field official when she was hired by the league in April. Thomas had previously become the first female to officiate a major college football game as well as the first to officiate a bowl game.

Official suspended one game due to timekeeping gaffe

The NFL suspended side judge Rob Vernatchi (from Pete Morelli's crew) for Week 6 of the regular season due to a timekeeping blunder that occurred during a game the previous week. The host San Diego Chargers kicked a field goal to take a 3-point lead over the Pittsburgh Steelers with 2:56 remaining in the fourth quarter. The subsequent kickoff was a touchback, which shouldn't have resulted in any time coming off the game clock. However, when the Steelers took over on offense the scoreboard clock read 2:38. Vernatchi was responsible for keeping the official game time, but he did not notice the 18-second discrepancy. The Steelers ended up scoring a touchdown to secure a win with no time left on the clock.

Referee crew demoted following questionable calls

The referee crew led by Pete Morelli had been assigned to officiate a Sunday Night Football game between the Indianapolis Colts and Pittsburgh Steelers in Week 13, but was reassigned to a different game (Philadelphia Eagles at New England Patriots), due to heavy criticism for questionable calls made during the previous week's Arizona Cardinals–San Francisco 49ers game. Morelli's crew drew the ire of Cardinals' head coach Bruce Arians and 49ers' safety Eric Reed, including a botched roughing-the-passer call on Cardinals' quarterback Carson Palmer that aided the Cardinals' eventual game-winning drive, as well as a missed delay-of-game penalty. Morelli's crew had previously been the subject of criticism, following a clock error during a Week 5 game – see above. In addition, Morelli's crew was involved in a missed call at the end of the Jacksonville Jaguars–Baltimore Ravens game in Week 10, where they missed a false start penalty against the Jaguars before the final snap that resulted in a facemask penalty against the Ravens when time expired, allowing the Jaguars to gain 15 yards and kick the game-winning field goal.

=== Discipline for off-field incidents ===
A total of 26 players were suspended by the league as of the season's first week. Most of these suspensions were for violations of the league's performance-enhancing drug (PED), substance abuse and personal conduct policies.

Browns GM suspended for texting scandal

Cleveland Browns general manager Ray Farmer was suspended by the league for the first four games of the 2015 season due to a texting scandal which occurred in 2014. The league found that Farmer had used a cellphone to communicate with personnel on the Browns' sideline "on multiple occasions during games" in violation of league rules which prohibit such communications. In addition to Farmer's suspension, the team was assessed a fine of $250,000.

Falcons stripped of draft pick after being caught supplementing crowd noise

The league stripped the Atlanta Falcons of their selection in the fifth round of the 2016 draft after it was determined that they had been using pre-recorded crowd noise during the team's home games throughout 2013 and into 2014. In addition to losing the draft pick the franchise was fined $350,000 and team president Rich McKay was suspended from his post as chairman of the league's Competition Committee for three months starting in April. The team fired event marketing director Roddy White who they determined was directly responsible for the violation.

Bills suspend assistant coach Aaron Kromer after assault arrest

Buffalo Bills offensive line coach Aaron Kromer was suspended by the team for the first six weeks of the season after he was arrested for an altercation during which Kromer allegedly punched a teenager. The incident occurred in July near Kromer's home in Florida. Charges in the matter were eventually dropped.

Browns assistant coach Andy Moeller suspended following an alleged domestic incident

Cleveland Browns offensive line coach Andy Moeller was suspended indefinitely by the Browns in September after in incident in which police were called to Moeller's house after a female houseguest alleged that Moeller physically assaulted her. Prosecutors declined to press charges related to the incident despite their conclusion that "it is quite clear an incident of volatile nature took place." On September 29, 2015, the Browns officially parted ways with Moeller.

== Records, milestones, and notable statistics ==
Week 1

- Tom Brady became the quarterback with the most regular season wins for a single franchise in NFL history (161 victories), breaking the record held by Brett Favre.
- Marcus Mariota became the first quarterback in NFL history to gain a perfect 158.3 passer rating in his NFL debut and the first quarterback in NFL history to throw four TD passes in the first half of his NFL debut. He also became the youngest quarterback to gain a perfect passer rating (21 years, 318 days) surpassing Robert Griffin III.
- Brandon McManus became the second kicker in NFL history to make multiple field goals of 56 or more yards in the same game, joining Greg Zuerlein, who did it in 2012.

Week 2

- Peyton Manning became the second quarterback in NFL history to reach 70,000 regular season passing yards, joining Brett Favre.
- The Denver Broncos set a new NFL record for consecutive division away wins with 13, surpassing the previous record that the San Francisco 49ers set between 1987 and 1990.
- The New York Giants became the first team in NFL history to start a season 0–2 while holding double digit leads in the fourth quarter in both games.
- Marcus Mariota became the first quarterback in NFL history to throw six TD passes in his first two career games.

Week 3

- Tom Brady became the fourth quarterback in NFL history to throw 400 touchdown passes in his career, joining Peyton Manning, Brett Favre, and Dan Marino.
- Peyton Manning became the second quarterback in NFL history to reach 6,000 pass completions, joining Brett Favre.
- Marcus Mariota tied the NFL record set by Mark Rypien in 1988 with eight TD passes in his first three career games.
- The Atlanta Falcons became the first team in NFL history to start a season 3–0 after trailing in the fourth quarter in all three games.

Week 4

- Drew Brees became the fifth quarterback in NFL history to throw 400 touchdown passes and became also the third quarterback in NFL history to reach 5,000 pass completions in his career.
- Adam Vinatieri became the first player in NFL history to score 1,000 points with two different teams.

Week 5

- The Indianapolis Colts recorded an NFL record 16th consecutive division win.
- Matthew Stafford and Dan Orlovsky combined to tie an NFL record for most pass attempts by one team in a game with 70 pass attempts during the Lions' loss to the Arizona Cardinals.
- Devonta Freeman became the first player in the Super Bowl era to rush for at least seven touchdowns in his first three starts to begin a career.
- Antonio Gates caught his 100th receiving touchdown and became the ninth player and second tight end to reach this mark in NFL history.
- Peyton Manning surpassed Brett Favre as the NFL's all-time leader in combined regular season and postseason passing yards.

Week 6

- Aaron Rodgers became the fastest quarterback in NFL history to throw for 30,000 yards, needing only 3,652 attempts to reach the mark.

Week 7

- Five teams (the Panthers, Packers, Broncos, Bengals, and Patriots) started the season 6–0, setting a new NFL record for most teams to start a season 6–0 or better.
- Ryan Tannehill set the NFL record for consecutive completed passes with 25, completing his first 18 passes his Week 7 game and the final seven of his previous game.
- Tom Brady became the fifth quarterback in NFL history to pass for over 55,000 yards.

Week 8

- In a game between the New York Giants and the New Orleans Saints, the two teams combined for 13 touchdown passes, setting a new NFL record for the most combined passing touchdowns between both teams in a single game. The Saints defeated the Giants, 52–49. Drew Brees became the eighth quarterback to throw seven TD passes in a single game and Eli Manning became the first quarterback in NFL history to throw six TD passes with no interceptions but lose the game. Brees also joined Ben Roethlisberger as one of only two quarterbacks in NFL history to throw for at least 500 yards in a game at least twice in a career. The combined score of 101 points was, at the time, the third highest scoring game in NFL history (although it has since moved to the fourth highest scoring game). In addition, the Giants' 49 points tied the NFL record for the most points scored by a losing team (with the Houston Oilers).
- Peyton Manning tied Brett Favre for the record of most regular season career victories all-time by a starting quarterback with the Broncos' 29–10 win against the Packers with 186 wins.
- Four teams started the season 7–0, setting a new NFL record.

Week 9

- For the first time in NFL history, three teams (the Bengals, Patriots, and Panthers) started the same season 8–0.
- The Buffalo Bills became the first team in NFL history with two 100-yard rushers (LeSean McCoy and Karlos Williams) and a 150-yard receiver (Sammy Watkins) in the same game.
- Marcus Mariota became the first rookie quarterback in NFL history to have two games with four touchdowns and no interceptions.

Week 10

- Peyton Manning became the NFL's all-time leader in regular season passing yards, surpassing Brett Favre.
- For the first time in NFL history, six starting quarterbacks who had previously won a Super Bowl lost on the same day (Peyton Manning, Eli Manning, Drew Brees, Aaron Rodgers, Joe Flacco, and Russell Wilson).
- Adrian Peterson tied O. J. Simpson for an NFL record sixth career game with 200+ yards rushing.
- The New England Patriots set a new NFL record by scoring in 35 consecutive quarters, breaking a record previously shared by the 1999 and 2000 St. Louis Rams and the 2005 Indianapolis Colts.
- The Detroit Lions' away win over the Green Bay Packers snapped the Lions' 24-game losing streak at Lambeau Field (both regular season and postseason games), which was the longest away losing streak by one NFL team against another team in NFL history.

Week 12

- Tom Brady tied Dan Marino for third place on the all-time passing touchdowns list.
- Travis Coons set an NFL record for most consecutive field goals made to open a career with 18.

Week 13

- Stephone Anthony scored the first ever defensive two-point conversion in NFL history by returning a blocked point after touchdown attempt by Carolina Panthers kicker Graham Gano.
- Larry Fitzgerald became the youngest person in NFL history to reach 1,000 career catches. Fitzgerald (32 years, 97 days old) broke the record that was held by Andre Johnson (33 years, 163 days).
- Andy Dalton became the second quarterback in NFL history to throw for at least 3,000 passing yards in each of their first five seasons, joining Peyton Manning.
- A. J. Green joined Randy Moss as one of only two wide receivers in NFL history to have 1,000 yards in each of their first five seasons.
- Jason Witten became the second tight end in NFL history to record 1,000 catches (joining Tony Gonzalez).

Week 14

- Adrian Peterson scored his 100th career touchdown, making him the 13th running back to reach this mark in NFL history.
- Drew Brees surpassed Dan Marino for fourth place on the NFL's all-time passing touchdowns list with two passing touchdowns.
- Antonio Brown became the sixth player in NFL history to record three straight 100-catch seasons, joining Marvin Harrison, Jerry Rice, Herman Moore, Brandon Marshall, and Wes Welker.
- The New England Patriots clinched the AFC East division title for the seventh straight season, tying them with the Rams franchise, which won seven straight NFC West division titles from the 1973 season through the 1979 season, for the NFL record of most consecutive division titles won by one franchise.
- The Green Bay Packers became the second franchise in NFL history to record 750 total wins, including playoff victories, joining the Chicago Bears as the only teams to reach this mark.
- Matthew Stafford became the fastest player to reach 25,000 yards as he reached this milestone in his 90th career game, which broke the record of 92 that was set by Dan Marino.
- Russell Wilson became the first quarterback in NFL history to have at least a 138.5 QB rating in four straight games.

Week 15

- Russell Wilson became the first quarterback in NFL history to have at least three touchdown passes and no interceptions in five straight games.
- Cam Newton became the first player in NFL history to rush for at least 100 yards and pass for at least 300 yards with five touchdowns in a single game.
- Tom Brady became the second quarterback in NFL history to throw at least 35 touchdown passes in a season four times, joining Peyton Manning.
- Drew Brees became the fourth quarterback in NFL history to reach at least 60,000 regular season passing yards, joining Peyton Manning, Brett Favre, and Dan Marino. Brees became both the youngest and fastest quarterback to reach this mark in NFL history. Brees also set new NFL records for most consecutive seasons with at least 4,000 passing yards (ten straight seasons) and most regular season games with at least 300 passing yards in a career (94 games).
- Antonio Brown set a new NFL record for the most receptions by any player in any three consecutive seasons in NFL history (355 receptions), breaking Marvin Harrison's record of 354 receptions during the 2000–02 seasons.
- The Kansas City Chiefs became the first team in NFL history to follow up a five-game losing streak with an eight-game winning streak.

Week 16

- Brandon Marshall reached 100 catches for an NFL record sixth season. He also became the first Jets player to reach 100 catches in a season.
- Anquan Boldin became the 13th player in NFL history to reach 1,000 career catches.
- In their loss to the St. Louis Rams, the Seattle Seahawks never gained a lead at any time, which ended their NFL record streak of 70 consecutive games (both regular season and playoff games) in which they had held a lead at any point during a game. This was the first time that the Seahawks failed to gain a lead at any point during a game since the final week of the 2011 season.
- The Kansas City Chiefs became the second team since the AFL-NFL merger to clinch a playoff berth after going 1–5 over the first six games of a season, joining the 1970 Cincinnati Bengals.
- Cam Newton became the first player in NFL history to throw at least 30 touchdown passes and score at least eight rushing touchdowns in a season.
- Antonio Brown became the second player in NFL history to record 1,600 receiving yards in back to back seasons, joining Calvin Johnson, who accomplished the feat in 2011–12. Brown also became the second player in NFL history to record 120 catches in back to back seasons, joining Cris Carter (1994–95).
- Adam Vinatieri became the third placekicker in NFL history to make 500 field goals in a career, joining Morten Andersen and Gary Anderson.
- As of the end of week 16, the New Orleans Saints had surrendered 43 total passing touchdowns during the season, setting a new NFL record for most passing touchdowns surrendered during a season.
- Kirk Cousins finished the season posting the highest completion percentage (74.7) in home games in NFL history, with a minimum of 100 attempts.

Week 17

- Russell Wilson became the first quarterback in NFL history to have 4,000 or more passing yards, 30 or more passing touchdowns, and 500 or more rushing yards in the same season.
- Antonio Brown set an NFL record of 265 receptions over the last two NFL seasons and became the first wide receiver in NFL history to record at least 1,700 yards from scrimmage in back-to-back seasons.
- Frank Gore became the 15th player in NFL history to reach 12,000 career rushing yards.
- Drew Brees finished the season with 4,870 passing yards, his NFL-record sixth consecutive season with at least 4,500 yards. Brees has seven career 4,500-yard passing seasons, the most in NFL history. Brees also led the league in passing for the sixth time in his career, setting an NFL record for most seasons leading the league, breaking the record of five that was shared by Sonny Jurgensen and Dan Marino. In addition, Brees tied Tom Brady for third most all-time regular season passing touchdowns after Brady failed to throw a TD pass during the Patriots' loss to the Miami Dolphins.
- Eleven different quarterbacks passed for 30 or more touchdowns setting an NFL single season record. The previous record was nine quarterbacks set in 2014.

Divisional Round

- Tom Brady tied Adam Vinatieri for the most career postseason game appearances in NFL history (30).
- Brandon McManus kicked five field goals in the Broncos' victory over the Pittsburgh Steelers, tying the NFL record for most field goals made in a postseason game.

Super Bowl 50

- The Denver Broncos became the fourth team to appear in eight Super Bowls, joining the Dallas Cowboys, New England Patriots and Pittsburgh Steelers.
- Denver Broncos' head coach Gary Kubiak became the first person in NFL history to reach a Super Bowl as both a player and a head coach with the same franchise. Kubiak was John Elway's backup quarterback on the Broncos from 1983 to 1991 and saw playing time in both Super Bowl XXI and Super Bowl XXIV. With Carolina Panthers' head coach Ron Rivera having previously played as a linebacker for the Chicago Bears in Super Bowl XX, this game was the first ever Super Bowl in which both head coaches had formerly played in a Super Bowl themselves.
- This game was the first ever Super Bowl in which both starting quarterbacks were No. 1 overall picks in an NFL draft; Peyton Manning was selected with the first overall pick in 1998 Cam Newton was selected with the first overall pick in 2011. This game was also the first Super Bowl to feature the top two overall picks from the same NFL draft on opposing teams; Newton and Broncos' linebacker Von Miller were selected first and second overall, respectively, in 2011.
- Peyton Manning, at age 39, became the oldest quarterback to ever start a Super Bowl, surpassing John Elway who started Super Bowl XXXIII at age 38. Manning also became the first quarterback in NFL history to lead two different teams to the Super Bowl multiple times; he previously led the Broncos to Super Bowl XLVIII and also led the Indianapolis Colts to both Super Bowl XLI and Super Bowl XLIV. With the Broncos' win, Manning surpassed Elway as the oldest quarterback ever to win a Super Bowl and also became the first quarterback in NFL history to lead two different teams to Super Bowl victories; he previously led the Indianapolis Colts to victory in Super Bowl XLI.
- Peyton Manning became the first quarterback in NFL history to record 200 combined regular season and postseason wins in a career. Manning surpassed Brett Favre (199) for the most combined regular season and postseason victories by a quarterback in a career.

== Regular season statistical leaders ==
Individual
Scoring leader	Stephen Gostkowski, New England (151)
Most field goals made	Blair Walsh, Minnesota (34 FGs)
Touchdowns	Doug Baldwin, Seattle, Devonta Freeman, Atlanta, Brandon Marshall, New York Jets and Allen Robinson, Jacksonville (14 TDs)
Rushing	Adrian Peterson, Minnesota (1,485 yards)
Passing yards	Drew Brees, New Orleans (4,870 yards)
Passing touchdowns	Tom Brady, New England (36 TDs)
Passer rating	Russell Wilson, Seattle (110.1 rating)
Pass receptions	Antonio Brown, Pittsburgh and Julio Jones, Atlanta (136 catches)
Pass receiving yards	Julio Jones, Atlanta (1,871 yards)
Combined tackles	NaVorro Bowman, San Francisco (154 tackles)
Interceptions	Reggie Nelson, Cincinnati and Marcus Peters, Kansas (8)
Punting	Johnny Hekker, Los Angeles (4,601 yards, 47.9 average yards)
Sacks	J. J. Watt, Houston (17.5)

== Awards ==
=== Individual season awards ===
The 5th NFL Honors, saluting the best players and plays from 2015 season, was held at the Bill Graham Civic Auditorium in San Francisco, California on February 6, 2016.

Award	Winner	Position	Team
AP Most Valuable Player	Cam Newton	Quarterback	Carolina Panthers
AP Offensive Player of the Year	Cam Newton	Quarterback	Carolina Panthers
AP Defensive Player of the Year	J. J. Watt	Defensive end	Houston Texans
AP Coach of the Year	Ron Rivera	Coach	Carolina Panthers
AP Assistant Coach of the Year	Wade Phillips	Defensive coordinator	Denver Broncos
AP Offensive Rookie of the Year	Todd Gurley	Running back	St. Louis Rams
AP Defensive Rookie of the Year	Marcus Peters	Cornerback	Kansas City Chiefs
AP Comeback Player of the Year	Eric Berry	Safety	Kansas City Chiefs
Pepsi Rookie of the Year	Jameis Winston	Quarterback	Tampa Bay Buccaneers
Walter Payton NFL Man of the Year	Anquan Boldin	Wide receiver	San Francisco 49ers
PFWA NFL Executive of the Year	Mike Maccagnan	General Manager	New York Jets
Super Bowl Most Valuable Player	Von Miller	Linebacker	Denver Broncos

=== All-Pro team ===
The following players were named First Team All-Pro by the Associated Press:

Offense
Quarterback	Cam Newton, Carolina
Running back	Adrian Peterson, Minnesota; Doug Martin, Tampa Bay
Fullback	Mike Tolbert, Carolina
Wide receiver	Antonio Brown, Pittsburgh; Julio Jones, Atlanta
Tight end	Rob Gronkowski, New England
Offensive tackle	Joe Thomas, Cleveland; Andrew Whitworth, Cincinnati
Offensive guard	Marshal Yanda, Baltimore; David DeCastro, Pittsburgh
Center	Ryan Kalil, Carolina

Defense
Defensive end	J. J. Watt, Houston; Khalil Mack, Oakland
Defensive tackle	Aaron Donald, St. Louis; Geno Atkins, Cincinnati
Outside linebacker	Von Miller, Denver; Khalil Mack, Oakland; Thomas Davis, Carolina
Inside linebacker	Luke Kuechly, Carolina; NaVorro Bowman, San Francisco
Cornerback	Josh Norman, Carolina; Patrick Peterson, Arizona
Safety	Tyrann Mathieu, Arizona; Eric Berry, Kansas City

Special teams
Placekicker	Stephen Gostkowski, New England
Punter	Johnny Hekker, St. Louis
Kick returner	Tyler Lockett, Seattle

=== Players of the week/month ===
The following were named the top performers during the 2015 season:

Week/ Month	Offensive Player of the Week/Month		Defensive Player of the Week/Month		Special Teams Player of the Week/Month	
Week/ Month	AFC	NFC	AFC	NFC	AFC	NFC
1	Marcus Mariota (Titans)	Julio Jones (Falcons)	Aqib Talib (Broncos)	Aaron Donald (Rams)	Jarvis Landry (Dolphins)	Tavon Austin (Rams)
2	Ben Roethlisberger (Steelers)	Larry Fitzgerald (Cardinals)	Darrelle Revis (Jets)	Sean Lee (Cowboys)	Travis Benjamin (Browns)	David Johnson (Cardinals)
3	A. J. Green (Bengals)	Aaron Rodgers (Packers)	Preston Brown (Bills)	Tyrann Mathieu (Cardinals)	Pat McAfee (Colts)	Darren Sproles (Eagles)
Sept.	Tom Brady (Patriots)	Julio Jones (Falcons)	DeMarcus Ware (Broncos)	Josh Norman (Panthers)	Stephen Gostkowski (Patriots)	Tyler Lockett (Seahawks)
4	Philip Rivers (Chargers)	Drew Brees (Saints)	T. J. Ward (Broncos)	Josh Norman (Panthers)	Justin Tucker (Ravens)	Robbie Gould (Bears)
5	Josh McCown (Browns)	Eli Manning (Giants)	Mike Adams (Colts)	Fletcher Cox (Eagles)	Mike Nugent (Bengals)	Bobby Rainey (Buccaneers)
6	DeAndre Hopkins (Texans)	Calvin Johnson (Lions)	Cameron Wake (Dolphins)	Kawann Short (Panthers)	Chris Boswell (Steelers)	Michael Mauti (Saints)
7	Ryan Tannehill (Dolphins)	Kirk Cousins (Redskins)	Telvin Smith (Jaguars)	Michael Bennett (Seahawks)	Stephen Gostkowski (Patriots)	Dwayne Harris (Giants)
Oct.	Andy Dalton (Bengals)	Devonta Freeman (Falcons)	Charles Woodson (Raiders)	Kawann Short (Panthers)	Brandon McManus (Broncos)	Johnny Hekker (Rams)
8	Tom Brady (Patriots)	Drew Brees (Saints)	Derek Wolfe (Broncos)	Kwon Alexander (Buccaneers)	Justin Tucker (Ravens)	Marcus Sherels (Vikings)
9	Marcus Mariota (Titans)	Cam Newton (Panthers)	Darius Butler (Colts)	Linval Joseph (Vikings)	Ryan Quigley (Jets)	Josh Brown (Giants)
10	Ben Roethlisberger (Steelers)	Kirk Cousins (Redskins)	Bacarri Rambo (Bills)	Terence Newman (Vikings)	Stephen Gostkowski (Patriots)	Ameer Abdullah (Lions)
11	Brock Osweiler (Broncos)	Cam Newton (Panthers)	J. J. Watt (Texans)	Lavonte David (Buccaneers)	Dustin Colquitt (Chiefs)	Mason Crosby (Packers)
12	C. J. Anderson (Broncos)	Russell Wilson (Seahawks)	Leon Hall (Bengals)	Luke Kuechly (Panthers)	Will Hill (Ravens)	Sam Martin (Lions)
Nov.	Antonio Brown (Steelers)	Adrian Peterson (Vikings)	J. J. Watt (Texans)	Tyrann Mathieu (Cardinals)	Adam Vinatieri (Colts)	Graham Gano (Panthers)
13	Brandon Marshall (Jets)	Cam Newton (Panthers)	Tyvon Branch (Chiefs)	Malcolm Jenkins (Eagles)	Antonio Brown (Steelers)	Dan Bailey (Cowboys)
14	Ryan Fitzpatrick (Jets)	Eli Manning (Giants)	Khalil Mack (Raiders)	Aaron Donald (Rams)	Rashad Greene (Jaguars)	Chandler Catanzaro (Cardinals)
15	Antonio Brown (Steelers)	Cam Newton (Panthers)	Marcus Peters (Chiefs)	Deone Bucannon (Cardinals)	Carlos Dunlap (Bengals)	Benny Cunningham (Rams)
16	Ryan Fitzpatrick (Jets)	Julio Jones (Falcons)	Robert Mathis (Colts)	Dwight Freeney (Cardinals)	Marquette King (Raiders)	Blair Walsh (Vikings)
Dec.	Antonio Brown (Steelers)	Kirk Cousins (Redskins)	Whitney Mercilus (Texans)	Kawann Short (Panthers)	Chris Boswell (Steelers)	Tyler Lockett (Seahawks)
17	Ronnie Hillman (Broncos)	Cam Newton (Panthers)	J. J. Watt (Texans)	Everson Griffen (Vikings)	D. J. Alexander (Chiefs)	Tyler Lockett (Seahawks)

Week	FedEx Air Player of the Week	FedEx Ground Player of the Week	Pepsi Next Rookie of the Week	Castrol Edge Clutch Performer of the Week
1	Philip Rivers (Chargers)	Carlos Hyde (49ers)	Marcus Mariota (Titans)	Tony Romo (Cowboys)
2	Tom Brady (Patriots)	Matt Jones (Redskins)	Jameis Winston (Buccaneers)	Derek Carr (Raiders)
3	Aaron Rodgers (Packers)	Devonta Freeman (Falcons)	Kwon Alexander (Buccaneers)	Julio Jones (Falcons)
4	Philip Rivers (Chargers)	Chris Ivory (Jets)	Todd Gurley (Rams)	Kam Chancellor (Seahawks)
5	Eli Manning (Giants)	Doug Martin (Buccaneers)	Jameis Winston (Buccaneers)	Tyrod Taylor (Bills)
6	Philip Rivers (Chargers)	Chris Ivory (Jets)	Stefon Diggs (Vikings)	Damarious Randall (Packers)
7	Ryan Tannehill (Dolphins)	Lamar Miller (Dolphins)	Amari Cooper (Raiders)	Tom Brady (Patriots)
8	Drew Brees (Saints)	Todd Gurley (Rams)	Kwon Alexander (Buccaneers)	Drew Brees (Saints)
9	Marcus Mariota (Titans)	DeAngelo Williams (Steelers)	Amari Cooper (Raiders)	Antonio Brown (Steelers)
10	Ben Roethlisberger (Steelers)	Adrian Peterson (Vikings)	Mario Edwards Jr. (Raiders)	Stephen Gostkowski (Patriots)
11	Jameis Winston (Buccaneers)	Doug Martin (Buccaneers)	Jameis Winston (Buccaneers)	Aaron Rodgers (Packers)
12	Russell Wilson (Seahawks)	Adrian Peterson (Vikings)	Amari Cooper (Raiders)	Derek Carr (Raiders)
13	Ben Roethlisberger (Steelers)	DeAngelo Williams (Steelers)	Thomas Rawls (Seahawks)	Jameis Winston (Buccaneers)
14	Russell Wilson (Seahawks)	Eddie Lacy (Packers)	Tyler Lockett (Seahawks)	Khalil Mack (Raiders)
15	Ben Roethlisberger (Steelers)	David Johnson (Cardinals)	Amari Cooper (Raiders)	Antonio Brown (Steelers)
16	Drew Brees (Saints)	Tim Hightower (Saints)	Preston Smith (Redskins)	Ryan Fitzpatrick (Jets)
17	Ryan Tannehill (Dolphins)	Rashad Jennings (Giants)	Tyler Lockett (Seahawks)	Peyton Manning (Broncos)

Month	Rookie of the Month	
Month	Offensive	Defensive
Sept.	Marcus Mariota (Titans)	Ronald Darby (Bills)
Oct.	Todd Gurley (Rams)	Eric Kendricks (Vikings)
Nov.	Jameis Winston (Buccaneers)	Damarious Randall (Packers)
Dec.	David Johnson (Cardinals)	Marcus Peters (Chiefs)

== Head coach/front office personnel changes ==
=== Head coach ===
==== Offseason ====
Team	2014 head coach	2014 interim head coach	Reason for leaving	2015 replacement	Story/Accomplishments
Atlanta Falcons	Mike Smith		Fired	Dan Quinn	Smith compiled a record of 67–50 (.573), including the postseason, in seven seasons with the Falcons. He is the only coach to lead the franchise to consecutive winning seasons and consecutive playoff berths. Quinn, who never held a head coaching position prior to 2015, had served as defensive coordinator for the Seattle Seahawks. Due to league anti-tampering rules, the Falcons had to wait until after the completion of the Seahawks' playoff run, before formally hiring Quinn.
Buffalo Bills	Doug Marrone		Resigned	Rex Ryan	Marrone compiled a record of 15–17 (.469) in two seasons with the Bills and resigned on December 31, 2014. His tenure was marked by the team's first winning season since 2004 but also by tensions with general manager Doug Whaley and players, especially Mike Williams, who requested a trade during the season. Marrone's contract had an opt-out clause which allowed him to resign his position within three days of the end of the season and still collect his full salary for the rest of the contract (he had one year remaining) if the team changed ownership which it did when the Bills were sold to the Pegula family in September. Marrone joined the Jacksonville Jaguars as offensive line coach. On January 12, 2015, the Bills hired Rex Ryan as their head coach. Ryan had spent the previous six seasons as head coach of the New York Jets.
Chicago Bears	Marc Trestman		Fired	John Fox	Trestman compiled a record of 13–19 (.406) in two seasons with the Bears, and had finished the 2014 season with a 5–11 record. He and general manager Phil Emery were both dismissed on December 29, 2014. Trestman then became offensive coordinator for the Baltimore Ravens. Fox was hired on January 16, 2015, to become the head coach. Fox spent the past 4 seasons as the head coach of the Denver Broncos.
Denver Broncos	John Fox		Mutual decision	Gary Kubiak	In four seasons with the Broncos, Fox compiled a record of 49–22 (.690) including postseason games, won his division all four seasons, and appeared in Super Bowl XLVIII, but was bounced from the playoffs in the divisional round the other three years. By mutual agreement, Fox left the team on January 12, 2015, following the most recent divisional playoff loss. Kubiak was hired on January 19, 2015, to become the head coach. Kubiak, formerly head coach of the Houston Texans from 2006 to 2013, spent the past season as the offensive coordinator of the Baltimore Ravens.
New York Jets	Rex Ryan		Fired	Todd Bowles	Ryan compiled a record of 50–52 (.490), including postseason games, in six seasons as head coach of the Jets. Ryan led the Jets to two AFC Championship Game appearances in his first two seasons, losing both, but failed to earn a winning season or playoff berth in his last four. He and general manager John Idzik, Jr. were both dismissed on December 29, 2014. Bowles was hired on January 14, 2015, to become their head coach after serving as defensive coordinator for Arizona Cardinals since 2013; he previously served as interim head coach of the Miami Dolphins in 2011.
Oakland Raiders	Dennis Allen	Tony Sparano	Fired	Jack Del Rio	Allen was fired on September 29, 2014, after an 8–28 (.222) record as Raiders head coach, and an 0–4 start to the 2014 season. Allen joined the staff of the New Orleans Saints for the 2015 season. Sparano, formerly head coach of the Miami Dolphins, finished the season as interim head coach, compiling a record of 3–9. He then became tight ends coach for the San Francisco 49ers. Jack Del Rio was hired on January 14, 2015, to become their head coach after serving as defensive coordinator for Denver Broncos since 2012; he previously served as head coach of the Jacksonville Jaguars from 2003 to 2011.
San Francisco 49ers	Jim Harbaugh		Mutually Part Ways	Jim Tomsula	Harbaugh compiled a record of 49–22–1 (.688), including postseason games, in four seasons with the 49ers, and led the team to three NFC Championship Game appearances and a berth in Super Bowl XLVII. After a mediocre 8–8 season in 2014 (the first time his team did not make the playoffs) and amid tensions between Harbaugh and the 49ers front office, Harbaugh left to become head coach at his college alma mater, the University of Michigan. On January 14, 2015, Jim Tomsula was promoted to head coach after serving as defensive line coach with the team since 2007; it is his second time at the helm, as he previously served as the 49ers' interim head coach for one game, after Mike Singletary's firing in 2010.

==== In-season ====
Team	2015 head coach	Reason for leaving	Interim replacement	Story/Accomplishments
Miami Dolphins	Joe Philbin	Fired	Dan Campbell	Philbin compiled a record of 24–28 (.462), with no playoff appearances, in 3¼ seasons as head coach of the Dolphins. The Dolphins were expected to be contenders for a playoff position in 2015 but grossly underachieved, starting the season 1–3, which led to Philbin's firing. Campbell, the team's tight ends coach, took over for the rest of the season.
Tennessee Titans	Ken Whisenhunt	Fired	Mike Mularkey	Whisenhunt compiled a record of 3–20 (.130), with no playoff appearances, in 1½ seasons as head coach of the Titans. After an impressive opening day win, the Titans lost six straight, resulting in Whisenhunt's dismissal. Mularkey, the team's tight ends coach, took over as interim head coach. Mularkey's previous head coaching experience includes two seasons with the Buffalo Bills (2004–05) and one season with the Jacksonville Jaguars (2012).
Philadelphia Eagles	Chip Kelly	Fired	Pat Shurmur	Kelly compiled a record of 26–21 (.553) in almost three years with the Eagles. He led the team to the playoffs in 2013, but lost in the Wild Card. He was fired from both his head coach and de facto general manager positions when the team, after its ninth loss of the season, was eliminated from postseason contention with one game remaining on the schedule. Shurmur, the Eagles' offensive coordinator, filled in as head coach for the team's last game; he previously coached the Cleveland Browns from 2011 to 2012.

=== Front office ===
==== Offseason ====
Team	Position	2014 office holder	Reason for leaving	2015 replacement	Story/Accomplishments
New York Jets	GM	John Idzik	Fired	Mike Maccagnan	Idzik was fired after two seasons with the New York Jets. He then joined the staff of the Jacksonville Jaguars as a consultant. On January 13, 2015, the Jets hired Maccagnan as new general manager of the team. He was the director of college scouting for the Houston Texans prior to his hiring.
Chicago Bears	GM	Phil Emery	Fired	Ryan Pace	Emery was fired after three seasons in Chicago. Pace was hired on January 8, 2015, after serving as the director of player personnel with the Saints since 2013.
Washington Redskins	GM	Bruce Allen	Replaced	Scot McCloughan	Bruce Allen was hired as general manager in December 2009 and was given the title of team president in May 2014. Allen abdicated his title of general manager when McCloughan was hired as the new general manager of the team on January 7, 2015. The former 49ers general manager and Seahawks personnel executive will report to team president Bruce Allen and will have final say over the 53-man roster in D.C.
Philadelphia Eagles	EVP-FO	Tom Gamble	Fired	Howie Roseman	Roseman, who served as General Manager of the Eagles from 2010 to 2014, was promoted up to Executive Vice President of Football Operations. The General Manager position Roseman leaves behind remained unfilled, and head coach Chip Kelly fulfilled the duties of that position until his Week 16 firing.

==== In-season ====
Team	Position	2015 office holder	Reason for leaving	2015 replacement	Story/Accomplishments
Detroit Lions	GM	Martin Mayhew	Fired	Sheldon White (interim)	After starting the season 1–6, the Lions fired offensive coordinator Joe Lombardi. One week later, after another loss to the Kansas City Chiefs, owner Martha Firestone Ford fired Mayhew and Lewland.
Detroit Lions	President	Tom Lewand	Fired	Rod Wood	After starting the season 1–6, the Lions fired offensive coordinator Joe Lombardi. One week later, after another loss to the Kansas City Chiefs, owner Martha Firestone Ford fired Mayhew and Lewland.
Philadelphia Eagles	VP- Player Personnel	Ed Marynowitz	Fired	Tom Donahoe	Vice President of Player Personnel Ed Marynowitz was fired alongside Head Coach Chip Kelly on December 29, 2015. Donahoe last served as president and general manager of the Buffalo Bills from 2001 to 2005 but has largely been out of football in the ten years since his firing from that position.
Philadelphia Eagles	GM (de facto)	Chip Kelly	Fired	Howie Roseman	Roseman, who carried the title of "executive vice president of football operations" while Kelly handled general manager duties in 2015, reverted to his previous general manager duties after Kelly's firing.

== Stadiums ==
Tennessee Titans' venue renamed Nissan Stadium

The stadium in Nashville where the Tennessee Titans play their home games was renamed Nissan Stadium in an agreement with automobile manufacturer Nissan. Though financial terms remain undisclosed, the naming rights deal is expected to last for twenty years. Nissan operates two plants in Tennessee and is one of middle Tennessee's largest employers. Since 2006, the facility had been branded as "LP Field", under a naming rights agreement with Nashville-based building materials manufacturer Louisiana-Pacific. This is the third name change for the venue since its 1999 opening.

Minnesota Vikings last season at TCF Bank Stadium

The Minnesota Vikings played at TCF Bank Stadium on the University of Minnesota campus in Minneapolis for the second straight season. The Vikings arranged to play there for two years after their former home, the Hubert H. Humphrey Metrodome, was closed after the 2013 season and demolished so U.S. Bank Stadium, their new stadium, could be built on the site. In August, a construction worker who was working on the new stadium died in a fall from the structure's roof.

NRG Stadium Convert to Turf

NRG Stadium, home of the Houston Texans, converted from a natural grass field to an artificial turf field after week 1. Despite various attempts to improve field conditions, players from both the Texans and the visiting Kansas City Chiefs complained of poor field conditions in their week 1 game. The decision to convert was made 5 days later, and the turf field was installed in time for the Texans next home game against Tampa Bay in Week 3.

=== NFL relocation candidates ===
==== Oakland Raiders ====
The team's lease at the Oakland Coliseum expired after the 2013 season, and the Raiders after that point became tenants of the Coliseum on a year-to-year basis.

===== San Antonio =====
On July 29, 2014, reports surfaced that the Oakland Raiders might consider relocating to San Antonio in 2015 after owner Mark Davis met with San Antonio civic leaders the week before at the encouragement of former Raider Cliff Branch, whom Davis was in town to visit for a local ceremony for Branch. The Raiders themselves acknowledged Davis being in San Antonio for the event for Branch before news broke about a possible relocation, but would not confirm nor deny that Davis also mentioned being there discussing moving his team east. Among the two existing NFL teams in Texas, Houston Texans' then-owner Bob McNair and Dallas Cowboys' owner Jerry Jones—the latter of which has San Antonio as part of his territorial rights and previously voiced support of an NFL team moving there when the New Orleans Saints temporarily played in San Antonio in 2005 due to damages to the Superdome following Hurricane Katrina – both favored an NFL team playing in San Antonio.

On September 3, 2014, the city of Oakland reached a tentative deal to build a new football stadium in Oakland, which would have resulted in the Coliseum being demolished; Davis did not respond to the proposal, which would have also forced the Oakland Athletics to build a new stadium of their own (which they did not agree to do), while Alameda County (then co-owners of the coliseum) indicated they would probably not have supported the plan. Davis, in the meantime, had team officials scout the Alamodome to determine if it would be suitable for the NFL.

===== Shared stadium with the Chargers in Los Angeles =====
On February 19, 2015, the Oakland Raiders and San Diego Chargers announced plans for a privately financed $1.7 billion stadium that the two teams would build in Carson, California, if they were to move to the Los Angeles market. Such a move would have marked a return to the nation's second-largest market for both teams; the Raiders played in Los Angeles from 1982 to 1994 while the Chargers called LA home for their inaugural season in the American Football League. The Chargers were at the time the only NFL team to play in Southern California, with San Diego being a 125-mile (201 km) distance from Los Angeles and had Los Angeles as a secondary market. The Chargers had been looking to replace Qualcomm Stadium (which, like the O.co Coliseum opened in the late 1960s) since at least 2003, and had an annual out clause in which it could move in exchange for paying a fine to the city of San Diego for its remaining years on its lease.

Due to television contracts, NFL bylaws, and being in the same division if both of the longstanding division rivals moved to Los Angeles, one of the teams would have had to move to the National Football Conference and the NFC West, something that Mark Davis volunteered the Raiders to be willing to do. The Raiders' move to the National Football Conference and the NFC West would have been considered ironic because Davis's father Al Davis was a staunch opponent of the NFL during its rivalry and eventual merger with the AFL. If such a realignment had occurred, one of the existing NFC West teams would have taken their spot in the AFC West. The early rumor was that the Seattle Seahawks, who played in the AFC West from 1977 to 2001, would have been the favorite to switch conferences with the Raiders. However, that team's then growing rivalry with the San Francisco 49ers (who are assured of staying in the NFC West) pointed to either the Arizona Cardinals or the St. Louis Rams (if the latter had stayed in St. Louis) moving to the AFC West to take the Raiders' spot. If the Rams stayed in St. Louis, switching them to the AFC would have allowed for a yearly home-and-home with the cross-state Kansas City Chiefs.

On October 23, 2015, Chargers spokesperson Mark Fabiani confirmed that the team planned to officially notify the NFL about its intentions to relocate to Los Angeles in January during the timetable for when teams can request to relocate.

==== St. Louis Rams ====
The Rams and the St. Louis CVC (Convention & Visitors Commission) began negotiating deals to get the Rams' home stadium, the Edward Jones Dome, into the top 25 percent of stadiums in the league (i.e., top eight teams of the thirty-two NFL teams in reference to luxury boxes, amenities and overall fan experience). Under the terms of the lease agreement, the St. Louis CVC was required to make modifications to the Edward Jones Dome in 2005. However, then-owner Georgia Frontiere waived the provision in exchange for cash that served as a penalty for the city's noncompliance. The City of St. Louis, in subsequent years, made changes to the scoreboard and increased the natural lighting by replacing panels with windows, although the overall feel remained dark. The minor renovations which totaled about $70 million did not bring the stadium within the specifications required under the lease agreement. On February 1, 2013, an arbitrator (3 panel) selected to preside over the arbitration process found that the Edward Jones Dome was not in the top 25% of all NFL venues as required under the terms of the lease agreement between the Rams and the CVC. The arbitrator further found that the estimated $700 million in proposed renovations by the Rams was not unreasonable given the terms of the lease agreement. Finally, the City of St. Louis was Ordered to pay the Rams attorneys' fees which totaled a reported $2 million.

Publicly, city, county and state officials expressed no interest in providing further funding to the Edward Jones Dome in light of those entities, as well as taxpayers, continuing to owe approximately $300 million more on that facility. As such, if a resolution was not reached by the end of the 2014–15 NFL season and the City of St. Louis remained non-compliant in its obligations under the lease agreement, the Rams were free to nullify their lease and relocate.

On January 31, 2014, both the Los Angeles Times and the St. Louis Post-Dispatch reported that Rams owner Stan Kroenke had purchased 60 acres of land adjacent to the Forum in Inglewood, Los Angeles County, California. It was, by the most conservative estimates, sufficient land on which an NFL-proper stadium could be constructed. The purchase price was rumored to have been US$90–100 million. Commissioner Roger Goodell represented that Kroenke informed the league of the purchase. As an NFL owner, any purchase of land in which a potential stadium could be built must be disclosed to the league. This development further fueled rumors that the Rams intended to return its management and football operations to Southern California. The land was initially targeted for a Walmart Supercenter but Walmart could not get the necessary permits to build the center. Kroenke is married to Ann Walton Kroenke, who is a member of the Walton family and many of Kroenke's real estate deals have involved Walmart properties. On January 5, 2015, The Los Angeles Times reported that Kroenke Sports & Entertainment and Stockbridge Capital Group were partnering to develop a new NFL stadium owned by Kroenke. The project included a stadium of up to 80,000 seats and a performance venue of 6,000 seats while reconfiguring the previously approved Hollywood Park plan for up to 890,000 square feet of retail, 780,000 square feet of office space, 2,500 new residential units, a 300-room hotel and 25 acres of public parks, playgrounds, open space and pedestrian and bicycle access. In lieu of this the city of St. Louis responded on January 9, 2015, by unveiling an outdoor, open-air, riverfront stadium that could accommodate the Rams and an MLS team with the hopes that the NFL bylaws would force them to stay. On February 24, 2015, the Inglewood City Council approved the stadium and the initiative with construction on the stadium beginning in December 2015.

With the Chargers, Raiders and Rams proposing their own stadiums as part of their Los Angeles relocation contingency plans, the proposed Farmers Field project was permanently scrapped in March 2015. Farmers Field was a proposal from Anschutz Entertainment Group to lure an NFL team to Los Angeles by promising a new stadium, but AEG placed restrictions on any relocation that the rest of the league found unacceptable, and the project had lain dormant since 2012.

== Super Bowl 50 promotion ==
To mark the 50th Super Bowl, various gold-themed promotions and initiatives were held during the 2015 season, including gold-tinted logos across all NFL properties, the numbering of the 50-yard line on fields being painted in gold, sideline jackets and hats featuring gold-trimmed logos from week 7 onward, and Pro Bowl jersey designs incorporating gold numbering. Gold footballs were given to each high school that has had a player or coach appear in the Super Bowl, and "homecoming" events were held by teams at games.

Through their first two home games, the Oakland Raiders declined to participate in the use of gold paint to mark the 50-yard line. On September 22, Sports Business Daily reported that NFL VP/Communications Brian McCarthy stated it was because the Oakland Athletics were still playing at the O.co Coliseum (the only stadium that is still shared by both an NFL team and a Major League Baseball team, which forces the Raiders to play on its dirt infield until the baseball season concludes), but the Coliseum's General Manager Chris Wright responded by saying that the Raiders told him not to apply the gold marks for the remaining regular season games. One day later, Raiders owner Mark Davis confirmed that the gold markings would be used after the conclusion of the Athletics season, boasting that because they had appeared in five of them, "nobody respects the Super Bowl more than Raiders".

== New uniforms and patches ==
After it had been leaked months before by the Packers that both teams were allowed to wear their colored jerseys for Thursday Night Football contests, on October 30, 2015, the NFL announced "Color Rush", a series of four Thursday contests in which all eight teams will wear one-time, specially designed and monochromatic alternate uniforms. The Carolina Panthers and Tennessee Titans wore their regular alternate uniforms (with the Panthers debuting "Carolina blue" pants), while the Dallas Cowboys revived their white "Double Star" uniforms from the mid-1990s (while debuting white pants) and the St. Louis Rams wore a gold version of their 1973–99 throwbacks for the games. The other four teams involved (Buffalo Bills, Jacksonville Jaguars, New York Jets, and Tampa Bay Buccaneers) wore all-new uniforms for the games. The November 12 game between the Bills and Jets was particularly problematic, with the Bills' all-red uniforms (the first time the team has ever worn a red jersey on the field) and the Jets' kelly green outfits being indistinguishable to those with color blindness.

- The Cleveland Browns unveiled new uniforms on April 14, 2015. There are three jersey colors and three pants colors: orange, brown, and white, allowing for nine possible uniform combinations. The uniforms have "Cleveland" above the numbers on the front, "Browns" down the leg, and "Dawg Pound" inside the collar. The uniforms are the first in the NFL to utilize contrast stitching and chainmail/raised numbers. The city name in front and team name down the leg are also NFL firsts. On February 24, the Browns slightly tweaked their logo. The orange on their helmet is brighter and the facemask, which was gray, is now brown. The team also updated their secondary logo.
- The San Francisco 49ers unveiled a new black alternate uniform on May 1, 2015. The jerseys have red numerals with matching black pants. This is the first alternate uniform in the team's history. In addition, the 49ers sported a helmet decal and lapel pin honoring Hall of Fame offensive lineman Bob St. Clair who died in April; the decal had St. Clair's number 79 in white inside a black football shape.
- The Tennessee Titans switched their primary colored jerseys from light "Titans Blue" to navy blue, the latter of which was the team's primary home jersey color from 1999 to 2007.
- The Green Bay Packers unveiled a new throwback uniform on July 28, 2015. The design features the same layout the Packers used between 1937 and 1949, and again in 1994. Like the previous 1920s-inspired throwbacks, the base colors will be brown, navy blue and yellow.
- The Miami Dolphins unveiled a new throwback uniform to commemorate the team's 50th season on July 29, 2015. The uniform is a throwback to the Dolphins' inaugural season in 1966. The team also wore a patch celebrating the anniversary during the entirety of the season.
- The Baltimore Ravens wore a patch to commemorate the team's 20th season. On December 20, 2015, the team also unexpectedly debuted gold pants for the first time, wearing them with their regular purple jerseys against the Kansas City Chiefs. Although gold is an official accent color of the Ravens, the pants got an overwhelmingly negative response on social media by both Ravens fans and fans of other NFL teams, with some comparisons being made to the rival Pittsburgh Steelers pants.
- The Tampa Bay Buccaneers wore a patch to commemorate the team's 40th season.
- The Oakland Raiders upgraded their uniforms to incorporate Nike's "Elite 51" technology, which most teams had been using since 2012.
- The New England Patriots changed the logo on their jerseys from their traditional cursive wordmark to the serif block lettering they adopted when they updated their logo in 2013.
- The Philadelphia Eagles wore a helmet decal in honor of Hall of Fame center/linebacker Chuck Bednarik who died in March. The decal featured Bednarik's number 60 in white inside a black circle.
- The Atlanta Falcons wore a patch recognizing the team's 50th season.
- The New York Giants honored the late Frank Gifford and Ann Mara by adding a number 16 helmet decal and patch for Gifford and Mara respectively.

== Media ==
This was the second season under the league's broadcast contracts with its television partners. On May 12, 2015, it was announced that ABC would simulcast ESPN's wildcard game, marking the first time that ABC broadcast any NFL game in nearly 10 years. ESPN also continued to carry Monday Night Football and the Pro Bowl. NBC continued to air Sunday Night Football, the annual Kickoff game, and the primetime Thanksgiving game. This was also the second year that included "cross-flexing" (switching) Sunday afternoon games between CBS and Fox before or during the season, regardless of whether the visiting team is in the AFC (which CBS normally airs) or the NFC (which is normally carried by Fox).

After its successful inaugural season under the arrangement, the NFL extended CBS's contract for Thursday Night Football into the 2015 season; as with the previous season, CBS produced all games, and the first seven games (weeks 2–7), as well as week 13, were broadcast by the CBS network. All games, including those not aired by CBS, were broadcast by NFL Network. The package also included one Saturday game in Week 15 and one in Week 16, both exclusive to NFL Network

Under a new eight-year deal, DirecTV continued to be the exclusive distributor of the NFL Sunday Ticket service.

Fox expanded its pre-game coverage by moving Fox NFL Kickoff to the main Fox network from Fox Sports 1, serving as a lead-in to Fox NFL Sunday.

On March 23, 2015, league owners voted to, as an experiment, suspend the NFL's blackout rules for the 2015 season; no games were blacked out in their home markets because of insufficient ticket sales. These moves came after the Federal Communications Commission's September 2014 decision to stop enforcing blackout rules on terrestrial television stations, and the fact that, ultimately, no games were blacked out at all during the 2014 season.

The NFL also experimented with online streaming as part of the International Series game between the Jacksonville Jaguars and Buffalo Bills. The game was streamed worldwide by Yahoo!, who handled hosting, promotion, and advertising sales for the stream, while CBS produced the telecast. The game only aired on television in the team's home markets (in accordance with NFL policies), as well as in the United Kingdom on BBC Two and Sky Sports, and in China. Brian Rolapp, the league's executive vice president of media, explained that the experiment was part of the NFL's efforts to attempt alternative distribution models for games, such as those that would appeal to viewers who do not subscribe to pay television. Yahoo! was reported to have paid $15 million for the rights fees, plus an additional $2 million "marketing fee", and beat out Amazon.com, Twitter, and YouTube—some of whom had made higher bids but would have planned to place the broadcast behind a paywall, which the league resisted.

The NFL entered into a social media partnership with Snapchat to present live stories with behind-the-scenes and fan perspectives from selected games.

== Television viewers and ratings ==
=== Most watched regular season games ===
- DH = doubleheader; SNF = NBC Sunday Night Football

Rank	Date	Matchup				Network	Viewers (millions)	TV rating	Window	Significance
1	November 26, 4:30 ET	Carolina Panthers	33	Dallas Cowboys	14	CBS	32.5	14.3	Thanksgiving	
2	November 1, 4:25 ET	Seattle Seahawks	13	Dallas Cowboys	12	Fox	29.4	17	Late DH	
3	December 13, 4:25 ET	Dallas Cowboys	7	Green Bay Packers	28	Fox	28.9	16.5	Late DH	Cowboys–Packers Rivalry; 2014 NFC Divisional Round rematch
4	December 6, 4:25 ET	Carolina Panthers	41	New Orleans Saints	38	Fox	28.6	16.3	Late DH^{[a]}	
5	November 15, 4:25 ET	New England Patriots	27	New York Giants	26	CBS	28.3	16.3	Late DH^{[b]}	Super Bowl XLVI rematch
6	November 26, 8:30 ET	Chicago Bears	17	Green Bay Packers	13	NBC	27.8	13.8	SNF	Bears–Packers rivalry
7	December 27, 4:25 ET	Green Bay Packers	8	Arizona Cardinals	38	Fox	27.8	15.5	Late DH^{[c]}	
8	November 22, 4:25 ET	Green Bay Packers	30	Minnesota Vikings	13	Fox	27.4	16.2	Late DH^{[d]}	Packers–Vikings rivalry
9	September 10, 8:30 ET	Pittsburgh Steelers	21	New England Patriots	28	NBC	27.4	16.2	Kickoff Game	Patriots–Steelers rivalry
10	September 20, 4:25 ET	Dallas Cowboys	20	Philadelphia Eagles	10	Fox	27.2	15.5	Late DH	Cowboys–Eagles rivalry

*Note – Late DH matchups listed in table are the matchups that were shown to the largest percentage of the market.

1. CAR/NO was shown to 61% of the markets during the late doubleheader time slot of Fox coverage.
2. NE/NYG was shown to 66% of the markets during the late doubleheader time slot of CBS coverage.
3. GB/ARI was shown to 92% of the markets during the late doubleheader time slot of Fox coverage.
4. GB/MIN was shown to 89% of the markets during the late doubleheader time slot of Fox coverage.

=== Playoff games ===
Rank	Game	Date	Matchup				Network	Viewers (millions)	TV Rating
1	Super Bowl 50	February 7, 2016, 6:30 ET	Carolina Panthers	10	Denver Broncos	24	CBS	111.9	46.6
2	AFC Championship	January 24, 2016, 3:05 ET	New England Patriots	18	Denver Broncos	20	CBS	53.3	31.7
3	NFC Championship	January 24, 2016, 6:40 ET	Arizona Cardinals	15	Carolina Panthers	49	Fox	45.7	26.8
4	Divisional Round	January 17, 2016, 4:40 ET	Pittsburgh Steelers	16	Denver Broncos	23	CBS	43.0	26.2
5	Wild Card Round	January 10, 2016, 4:40 ET	Green Bay Packers	35	Washington Redskins	18	Fox	38.8	23.6
6	Divisional Round	January 17, 2016, 1:05 ET	Seattle Seahawks	24	Carolina Panthers	31	Fox	36.7	23.1
7	Wild Card Round	January 10, 2016, 1:05 ET	Seattle Seahawks	10	Minnesota Vikings	9	NBC	35.3	22.5
8	Divisional Round	January 16, 2016 8:15 ET	Green Bay Packers	20	Arizona Cardinals	26	NBC	33.7	20.3
9	Divisional Round	January 16, 2016, 4:35 ET	Kansas City Chiefs	20	New England Patriots	27	CBS	31.5	19.7
10	Wild Card Round	January 9, 2016, 8:15 ET	Pittsburgh Steelers	18	Cincinnati Bengals	16	CBS	31.2	19.2
11	Wild Card Round	January 9, 2016, 4:20 ET	Kansas City Chiefs	30	Houston Texans	0	ESPN/ABC	25.1	16.2
