= San Diego Chargers stadium proposals =

There were several proposals to build a new stadium for the San Diego Chargers of the National Football League (NFL), replacing San Diego Stadium as the franchise's home venue.

The team and city both attempted to bring business partners in on a proposed $800 million project, which was supposed to be located in the parking lot of the current stadium and include upgrades to the area and infrastructure, but all efforts failed.

In August 2016, it was announced that the Citizens’ Initiative for the Chargers' stadium was officially named Ballot Measure C. In the wake of a decisive defeat at the ballot for stadium public funding 57%-43% during the 2016 United States elections, the Chargers announced in January 2017 their intention to relocate to Los Angeles, joining the Rams, who had also relocated from St. Louis the previous year. Both teams now share SoFi Stadium. The venue's opening in 2020 marked the first time since 1960 that the two teams would play again together in the same city and stadium.

== History ==
During the 2003 NFL season and even beforehand, there was much talk of the Chargers replacing the increasingly obsolete (by NFL standards) San Diego Stadium with a more modern, Super Bowl-caliber football stadium, mainly due to obsolete features of the stadium as well as severe maintenance issues with the facility.

=== San Diego Stadium Coalition ===
The San Diego Stadium Coalition, a grassroots community organization formed in January 2009 with the singular objective of facilitating the development of a new stadium in San Diego County. Citing the economic benefits of constructing a new stadium and a desire to keep the San Diego Chargers in the region, they worked with taxpayers groups, developers, politicians and the Chargers to move the stadium effort forward. By leveraging social networking sites such as Facebook and Twitter along with traditional media outlets and interactive public forums, they amassed a sizeable following in a brief amount of time. Their website served as the hub for their effort.

=== Planning and financing ===
The cost of stadium construction would have been financed by the Chargers, who would have paid for construction with the profits of an adjoining development. The team would have required a large tract of land either for free or at nominal cost to make the project economically feasible. Based on the site that is selected, the adjoining development would have been a combination of commercial, residential and retail uses.

Based on the site chosen, the Chargers would have largely relied on mass transit to take fans to and from the stadium on game days since it is unlikely that any of the proposed sites would have provided enough land for a stadium, real estate development and surface-level parking lots. A proposed golf course site in Oceanside, for example, was approximately 71 acres (see below), less than half the size of the Qualcomm site (166 acres (0.7 km^{2})) that was initially proposed by the Chargers. Plus the necessary widening of I-5 will not begin until at least 2020 according to Caltrans.

=== Proposed Stadium Sites ===
==== National City ====
The proposed National City site was west of Interstate 5 and south of Bay Marina Drive, located east of the 24th Street Marine Terminal. The Port of San Diego studied the dimensions of the site and come to the conclusion that a stadium could be built on the 52-acre (210,000 m^{2}) site without disturbing the Port's mission to promote maritime jobs and commerce. Any potential development proposal would have required the Port's approval.

Planning discussions were discussed among the Port, National City and waterfront businesses to reconfigure the layout of the site to make it more efficient with or without a stadium. National City officials believed the benefit of a new stadium would spur new developments around it, generating tax dollars while also boosting the city's profile.

On May 12, 2007, National City dropped its new stadium proposal, citing problems with land ownership.

==== Downtown San Diego ====
There were three notable proposals for downtown San Diego. The first and most notable was the plan by Doug Manchester to replace the 10th Avenue Marine Terminal with a stadium complex. An alternative to the 10th Avenue site was to place the stadium on the waterfront behind the San Diego Convention Center. Finally the East Village was recently proposed by the Chargers due to less legal concerns from local Environmental Activists.

===== 10th Avenue Marine Terminal replacement =====
This proposal was by far the most ambitious. Local philanthropist and real estate developer Doug Manchester proposed building the new stadium on the site of the 10th Avenue Marine Terminal. This was opposed by Port Commissioners at the Port of San Diego and the idea never publicly passed the preliminary design phase.

===== Waterfront Convadium =====
One proposed plan, known as the Phase 4 Expansion, would have put the stadium on the waterfront behind the San Diego Convention Center. This would have allowed for the Phase 3 expansion of the convention center to continue. The stadium could have been used during major events such as San Diego Comic-Con. The new stadium would have also allowed for San Diego to host the Super Bowl again and it would have given the city the option of applying to host the 2028 or 2032 Summer Olympics. The Chargers' current Convadium design would fit in this proposed location if the East Village site is not selected.

===== East Village =====
The Chargers had talks with the City of San Diego regarding a site south of Petco Park in the East Village Area of downtown San Diego. Although this site had been seen as the most viable option, few if any steps had taken place. Coupled with the NFL labor situation, lack of funds through the NFL G3 Program and California Gov. Jerry Brown's proposals for the review of redevelopment funds in the state the downtown Proposal was left in limbo. Former mayor Jerry Sanders explored numerous options to build the stadium in the East Village. Making the project a part of the San Diego Convention Center's expansion had been one option. On February 23, 2016, the Chargers announced that they were focusing efforts on downtown San Diego for a multi-use stadium/convention center in addition to a citizen's initiative that would include a stadium.

==== Outside the city of San Diego ====
After many failed attempts by the Chargers and the City of San Diego to come to an agreement on the new stadium, mainly due to the city's inability to fund a stadium, the Chargers organization considered other places in San Diego County, notably Chula Vista, Oceanside, and Escondido.

===== Oceanside =====
The Oceanside City Council agreed to have talks with the Chargers about building a stadium in Oceanside. The Center City Golf Course, also known as "Goat Hill", was under consideration as a possible stadium location. The golf course site is northeast of the Interstate 5/Oceanside Boulevard interchange. The city owns an adjoining 4 acres (16,000 m^{2}) to the north of the golf course, which would have provided a development footprint of more than 75 acres (300,000 m^{2}). The site also offered easy access to two major freeways as well as two passenger rail lines.

Oceanside also had an advantage considering that 8,800 of the team's season ticket holders already came from North County, 8,500 were from Orange and Riverside counties, and 4,500 come from outside the state. A stadium built at this site was seen as having the ability to attract more fans from Orange County, Riverside County, and Los Angeles.

There were problems with the site if the Chargers chose to build the stadium there. The golf course is zoned parkland, and voters would have had to approve a zoning change for a stadium to be built. Also some believe that the stadium, if it was built, had the possibility of causing traffic and environmental issues to the area, especially during game days. The Chargers acknowledged that the golf course site may not have been large enough to sustain a development profitable enough to offset the cost of stadium construction. In that case, they would have sought to obtain additional real estate in Oceanside or elsewhere in San Diego County to further develop.

===== Chula Vista =====
Chula Vista officials discussed multiple sites where the Chargers can build a stadium. Two privately owned sites on the city's east side and two near the waterfront.

- One proposed Chula Vista site was located near State Route 125, southwest of the Chula Vista Olympic Training Center. The site had the land that a stadium would require, as well as transportation options for reaching such a venue. However, there were concerns about the site's distance from main transit lines.
- One proposed site rested on Chula Vista's bayfront which was used to be occupied by the South Bay Power Plant.
- Another proposed site rested in a vacant B.F. Goodrich site adjacent to the property that had already been designated for the Chula Vista Bayfront, a $750 million convention center and hotel complex.
- Another proposed Chula Vista option fell on private property, owned by residential homebuilder, HomeFed Corp, which owns 3,000 acres (12 km^{2}) in the Otay Ranch area, had conducted talks with the Chargers.
- A new proposed site became questionably available after expected developments on Chula Vista's bayside were disbanded by Gaylord Entertainment.

====== Possible name change ======
The mayor of Chula Vista suggested that a stadium deal could have involved the team being re-branded as the "Chula Vista Chargers". The team's spokesman did not completely reject the notion, but indicated that such a condition would only have been considered if the stadium was entirely publicly financed.

=== The Ballot Measures ===
On April 21, 2016, the Chargers unveiled renderings of a stadium/convention center adjacent to Petco Park. On April 23, 2016, the San Diego Chargers launched their initiative effort with a rally in downtown with an estimated 4,000 people attending; among the people who attended this event were Chargers chairman Dean Spanos, NFL Commissioner Roger Goodell, quarterback Philip Rivers, former running back LaDainian Tomlinson, and coach Mike McCoy. On June 10, 2016, the Chargers announced that they had collected 110,786 signatures, enough to put the stadium proposal on the ballot in November; these signatures however needed verification. On July 9, 2016, San Diego City Clerk Liz Maland announced that the downtown stadium initiative has secured enough valid signatures to be on the November 2016 ballot. On July 18, 2016, the San Diego City Council voted to allow both the Chargers stadium plan and the Citizens Plan on the November ballot.

==== Ballot Measure C ====
In August 2016, it was announced that the Citizens’ Initiative sponsored by the Chargers was officially named Ballot Measure C. The ballot measure went on to a decisive defeat at the polls 57%-43%. The initiative set the stadium in the Tailgate Park space, across the street from Petco Park in downtown San Diego.

==== Ballot Measure D ====
Measure D, also known as the Briggs Initiative, was an alternative measure to Measure C and was written by Cory Briggs, a public-interest attorney. Ballot Measure D would have permit the Chargers to build a stadium in either downtown or Mission Valley. It would have required another vote if it used public funds. The measure would have raised San Diego's tax on hotel stays from 12.5% to 15.5% (14% for small hotels). Ballot Measure D was not sponsored by the Chargers. It was opposed by the San Diego County Taxpayers Association and the San Diego Tourism Authority. It was favored by the San Diego Regional Chamber of Commerce, as well as San Diego Representative Scott Peters, the Building Trades Council, and a fan group known as the San Diego Stadium Coalition.

==== Support ====
On July 28, 2016, the San Diego Regional Chamber of Commerce endorsed the Chargers’ downtown stadium ballot measure.

Chairman of the Chargers Dean Spanos hired several private consultants, including Robin Hunden, an economic development expert, to analyze the plan. Their preliminary results showed that a new stadium would have supplied an estimated additional 200,000 visitors yearly for conventions. The analysis stated their surveys showed that raising the hotel tax from its current 12.5% up to 16.5% would not have caused harm to the tourism economy, countering claims laid by the opposition that the additional tax would have caused fewer tourists to come to San Diego.

==== Opposition ====
Voice of San Diego reported on March 11, 2015, that a new Chargers' stadium would likely not make San Diego money, citing that the city still owed millions in tax dollars for the renovations to Chargers' Qualcomm Stadium repairs from 1997, and is currently paying about $12 million yearly for Qualcomm. The article stated that San Diego taxpayers subsidized Qualcomm stadium with over $10 million a year because the Chargers and other stadium events didn't generate enough revenue to cover costs. Qualcomm stadium also cost taxpayers almost $2 million each year for police and fire services at Chargers games, as well as repairs to the stadium, costs which were not compensated for by the Chargers.

On May 31, 2016, the American Institute of Architects San Diego wrote an article in opposition to a downtown stadium for the Chargers, because of "significant, unanswered questions about potential cost overruns and environmental impacts that may cost San Diego taxpayers hundreds of millions of dollars."

The “No Downtown Stadium – Jobs and Streets First” coalition was formed in June 2016. They announced they were opposed to the Citizens' Initiative and published several opinion pieces in local newspapers.

The coalition defined their central idea as, "We should not raise taxes to build a stadium and subsidize a billion-dollar corporation, especially when we have so many needs in San Diego, including street repairs. Additionally, this tax measure puts our economy and tourism jobs at risk, and it threatens an important revenue source the City relies on to pay for street repairs, 911 dispatchers, libraries and other neighborhood services. All this to help a billionaire build a new workspace for millionaires."

The No Downtown Stadium group said the project would have created less property tax revenue and new jobs than alternative developments such as offices or housing, and would ultimately have cost the city money.

On July 28, 2016, Ted Molter, the Tourism Authority chairman, expressed in a statement that Comic-Con officials were opposed to the stadium proposal because the site was located on a different site than the convention center. He also said that the new hotel tax would have made San Diego have one of the highest hotel tax rates in the nation.

On July 29, 2016, the “East Village South Focus Plan” was released by a group of volunteer architects and planners as an alternative to the stadium in the Tailgate Park space. Estimated to generate $55.2 million in annual taxes and create 5,590 permanent jobs, The released plan included 4.5 million square feet of development, including housing, offices, restaurants, parks, plazas and a convention annex or arena. The cost of the plan was estimated at $1.8 billion, which was about the same as was the estimated cost for the stadium.

On August 8, 2016, Chris Cate, a San Diego Council member, said in a segment for NBC 7 San Diego that if the Chargers built the stadium at Tailgate Park that the city would have had to build new Padres parking. The chairman of the group which owns the San Diego Padres, Ron Fowler, noted that a new stadium at Tailgate Park would have forced San Diego to spend millions of tax dollars on new parking for the Padres. It had been estimated that the additional parking for the Padres would have cost $75 million on top of the Chargers' proposal. Fowler also stated that Ballot Measure C would break a city sign ordinance because it would have allowed large digital billboards to be erected outside the stadium, lighting up East Village with light from the billboards until 2 a.m. each day. Some local residents were concerned it would be across the street from the San Diego Central Library.

Some critics believed building the stadium would have put San Diego in risk of losing Comic-Con because the proposed site would have been more than half a mile away from the convention center. Comic-Con officials claimed the large separation made the stadium unusable to Comic-Con, and believed there needed to be a contiguous expansion of the convention center. John Rogers, Comic-Con board president, wrote a message in the convention's souvenir book that they were opposed to any expansion that wasn't contiguous with the current convention center.

On August 15, 2016, the Public Resources Advisory Group published an independent report which estimated the stadium plan would have required a public contribution of $2.3 billion over 30 years, which was more than twice as much as the estimate of $1.1 billion by the Chargers.

A Chicago-based consulting firm, HVS Convention, Sports & Entertainment Facilities Consulting, released a study saying that despite claims by the Chargers, the stadium would only generate about $2.3 million extra in additional hotel tax revenue each year, but estimated the annual public costs would be $67 million for the operation and constructions of the project. They also stated that attempts in other cities to combine a convention center with a football stadium had largely failed, citing Indianapolis, St. Louis and Atlanta.

On August 21, 2016, the San Diego County Taxpayers Association announced its opposition to Ballot Measure C. The association claimed the project could cost the city at least $400 million and probably more, and the city would likely have to pay the difference using the general fund.

==== Controversy ====
Cory Briggs, the attorney who authored the Citizens’ Plan, stated that Ballot Measure C did not create a new special tax on San Diegans, and therefore required only a simple majority of votes for the measure to be approved. San Diego City Attorney Jan Goldsmith publicly announced on August 5, 2016, that since it allocated taxes towards a specific project, instead of a general fund, that Ballot Measure C was a new special tax on San Diego, and would need a 2/3 majority of votes to pass.

In August 2016, the Chargers purchased Facebook ads targeted towards Chris Cate, a Republican City Council member, for his opposition to Ballot Measure C. The ad gave Cate's office phone number accompanied by the text, “Why does Chris Cate want the Chargers to leave San Diego? Please call and ask him.” In a statement, Cate said his office received approximately 200 calls in response to the ad. He claimed that many of the calls were polite, "some that were belligerent" and "one threat that was referred to the police." Cate said he was a Chargers fan, but "I just think this is a bad deal for the city and San Diegans.”

== Relocation to Los Angeles ==
After a failed bid with the Oakland Raiders to build a stadium in Carson, California in January 2016 the Chargers received the first option to relocate to Los Angeles and share the winning bid (SoFi Stadium) with the Los Angeles Rams, conditioned on a negotiated lease agreement between the two teams. The option if not taken by the Chargers would have expired on January 15, 2017, at which time the Oakland Raiders would have acquired the same option. On January 29, 2016, the Rams and Chargers came to an agreement in principle to share the stadium. The Chargers would contribute a $200 million stadium loan from the NFL and personal seat license fees to the construction costs and would pay $1 per year in rent to the Rams.

After the failure of the ballot options and getting an extension of the Los Angeles option until January 17, on January 12, 2017, Dean Spanos, chairman and owner of the Chargers, stated in an open letter that the team would relocate to Los Angeles. Simultaneously, the team's social media dropped 'San Diego' and was updated to 'Los Angeles Chargers'. A new marketing logo using the iconic 'LA' symbol used by the Los Angeles Dodgers was also debuted. The team moved to Dignity Health Sports Park (known as StubHub Center until 2018) and played there for the 2017, 2018, and 2019 NFL seasons until SoFi Stadium was complete in 2020.

After the Chargers relocated it was reported that the NFL was prepared to go to lengths to keep the Chargers in San Diego. One of the options included Rams owner Stan Kroenke sending money (possibly over a series of years) to help the Chargers build a stadium in San Diego in an attempt to keep Los Angeles a one-team town all to himself; however, Spanos used his Los Angeles option before the league could act and the money offered may not have been enough to build a new San Diego stadium anyway.

== San Diego State University stadium ==
San Diego State University bought the former site of San Diego Stadium from the City of San Diego during the summer of 2020, to be redeveloped as the SDSU Mission Valley Campus. The university immediately began building Snapdragon Stadium on the new campus. San Diego Stadium was not yet demolished when the construction began. The 35,000-seat stadium is currently home of the San Diego State Aztecs football program, since the 2022 season. The new facility was designed to be expandable to 55,000 seats if necessary, in the future (e.g., if San Diego gets another NFL franchise.) Ironically, the Aztec football team's temporary home stadium pending the completion of Snapdragon Stadium was the same facility the Chargers used from 2017 to 2019: Dignity Health Sports Park in Carson, California (about 120 miles north of the SDSU campus.)

== Petco Park ==
Petco Park, the home of the San Diego Padres, would have hosted a football game for the first time on December 28, 2021: i.e., the 2021 Holiday Bowl (which was cancelled at the last moment because of positive COVID-19 tests on the UCLA squad.) This would have been the first in a series of six annual Holiday Bowl games at the baseball park. The changeover process used to make the 2021 game possible took several weeks, cost about $1,000,000, and would likely have been impractical during the baseball season.
