= Public Resources Advisory Group =

- Company type: Private
- Industry: Public finance, Financial services
- Founded: 1985
- Headquarters: 40 Rector Street, Manhattan, New York City, New York, U.S.
- Area served: U.S.
- Products: Independent Financial Adviser, Municipal Bond Issues, Financial Services, Investment Advisory
- Website: www.pragadvisors.com

Public Resources Advisory Group (PRAG) is a financial and investment advisory firm headquartered in New York City, with offices in Los Angeles, Philadelphia, St. Petersburg, Oakland, and Boston. The firm was founded in 1985 to provide in-depth support to state and local governments, authorities and agencies and other not-for-profit entities.

Thomson Reuters has ranked PRAG as one of the top three financial advisory firms in the nation over the past decade. In 2010, PRAG was the #1 financial adviser in New York State and California, by volume. Nationally in 2010, PRAG managed 172 municipal bond issues totaling over $42 billion in volume.
