= Tyree (surname) =

Tyree is a surname, and may refer to:

- Alexander K. Tyree (1915–2006), American naval officer
- Breein Tyree (born 1998), American basketball player
- Chris Tyree (born 2001), American football player
- David Tyree (born 1980), American football player
- Earl Tyree (1890–1954), American baseball player
- Elizabeth Tyree (1865–1952), American actress
- Ella Tyree (fl. 1953–1966), American medical researcher
- Evans Tyree (1854–1920), American doctor and AME Bishop
- James C. Tyree (1957–2011), American financier
- John A. Tyree (1911–2004), American admiral
- Marion Cabell Tyree, American cookbook author
- Omar Tyree (born 1969), American novelist
- Ralph Burke Tyree (1921–1979), American painter
- Randy Tyree (1940–2025), American politician
- William Tyree (1921–2013), Australian engineer
