= Tyree =

Tyree may refer to:

== People ==
- Tyree (surname)

=== Americans with the given name ===
==== In American football ====
- Tyree Davis (born 1970)
- Tyree Gillespie (born 1998)
- Tyree Hollins (born 1990)
- Tyree Jackson (born 1997)
- Tyree Kinnel (born 1997)
- Tyree Robinson (born 1994)
- Tyree St. Louis (born 1997)
- Tyree Talton (born 1976)
- Tyree Wilson (born 2002)

==== In other fields ====
- Tyree H. Bell (1815–1902), Confederate general
- Tyree Blocker (born 1953), law enforcement officer
- Tyree Cooper, record producer
- Tyree Glenn (1912–1974), musician
- Tyree Guyton (born 1955), artist
- Tyree Scott (1940–2003), activist
- Tyree Washington (born 1976), sprinter

== Places ==
- Tyree, Georgia, United States
- Taieri Island, New Zealand (once spelt Tyree)
- Mount Tyree, Antarctica

== Fictional elements ==
- Clinton Tyree, a character in Carl Hiaasen's comedic crime novels
- Tyree, a fictional planet introduced in "Image in the Sand", a Star Trek: Deep Space 9 episode
- A character in the Star Trek episode "A Private Little War", played by Michael Witney.

== See also ==
- Tiree, island in Scotland
- Tyrie, a surname
- Tyreek, given name
- Tyre (disambiguation)
