= Tyreek =

Tyreek or Tyreke is a given name. Notable people with the name include:

Tyreek

- Tyreek Burwell (born 1992), American football player
- Tyreek Chappell (born 2002), American football player
- Tyreek Duren (born 1991), American basketball player
- Tyreek Hill (born 1994), American football player
- Tyreek Johnson (born 1999), American football player
- Tyreek Maddox-Williams (born 1997), American football player

Tyreke

- Tyreke Evans (born 1989), American basketball player
- Tyreke Johnson (born 1998), English footballer
- Tyreke Smith (born 2000), American football player

== See also ==
- Tyree (disambiguation), includes list of people with given name Tyree
