= Robert E. Lee cake =

American layer cake

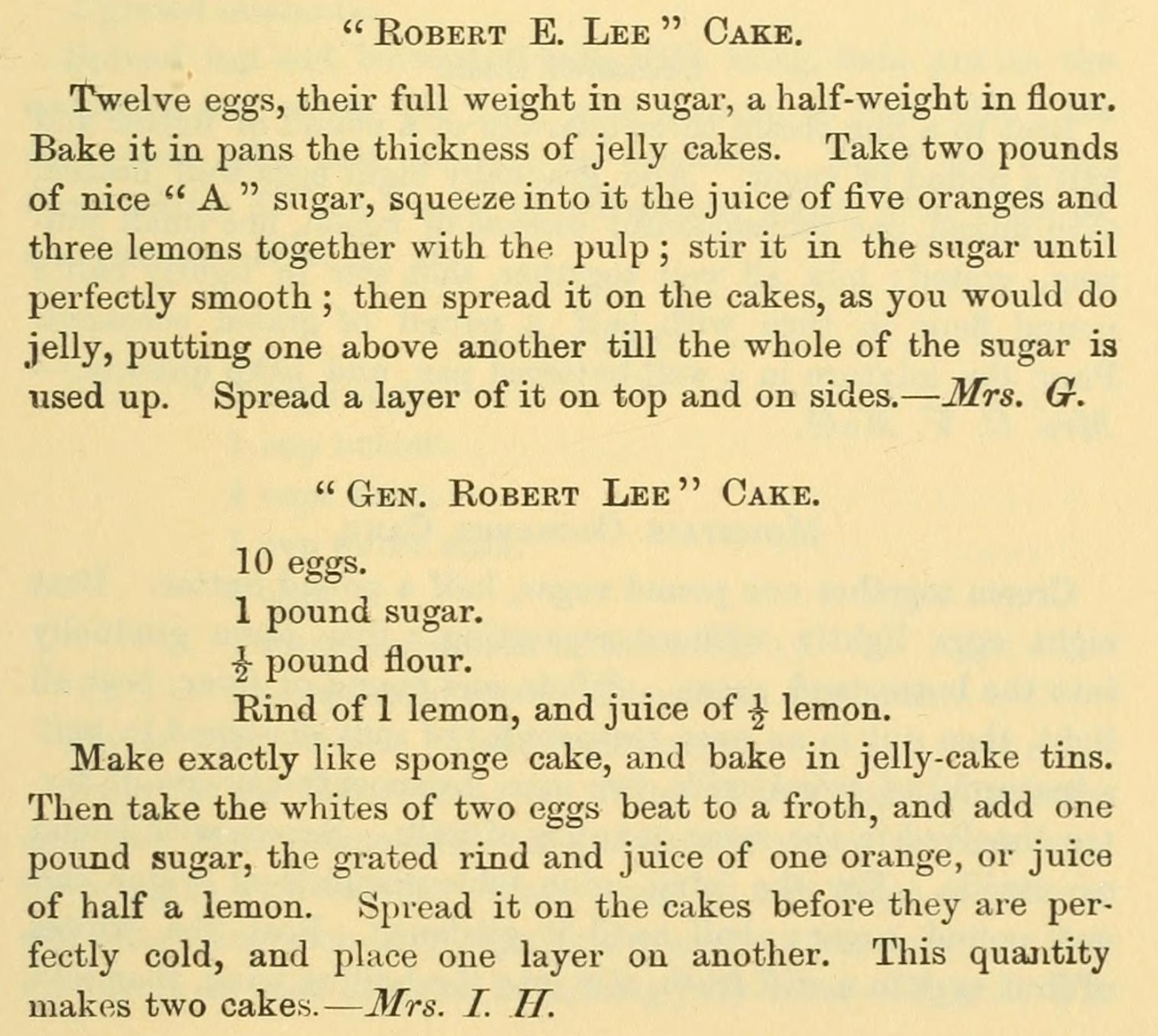
Recipes for Robert E. Lee cake in Marion Cabell Tyree's Housekeeping in Old Virginia, 1879 ed

Robert E. Lee cake, also known under variations such as General Robert E. Lee cake, is a layer cake flavored with the rind and juice of a lemon, an orange, or both in the icing and filling. It is named for Robert E. Lee, a Confederate general during the American Civil War, and was an early cake where some versions included baking powder, then a novel ingredient.

== Description ==
Robert E. Lee cake is a layer cake flavored with the rind and juice of a lemon, an orange, or both. Besides the filling, citrus juice also flavors an egg white frosting. In The Oxford Encyclopedia of Food and Drink in America, food writer Steven Schmidt identifies "Robert E. Lee cake" as simply the southern name for an orange cake, which was popular across America in the late 19th century.

== History ==
The Robert E. Lee cake was named for Robert E. Lee, a Confederate general during the American Civil War—naming desserts for national heroes being common practice in the United States until the end of the 19th century. (Note: Stonewall Jackson, another Confederate General during the American Civil War also had a cake named after him. This was flavoured with lemon and brandy, and required large quantities of egg whites: 18 in one recipe. By 2010, the cake was described by one scholar as having "faded into culinary oblivion".) Variations of the name include Gen. Robert Lee cake and General Robert E. Lee cake. The first recipes for Robert E. Lee cakes appear after 1870, following Lee's death. Due to this, historian Alysa Levene surmises the cake's naming was intended as an honor. A recipe was not included in the kitchen notebook of his wife Mary Anna Custis Lee. Despite this, food writer Mark Zanger states Lee "may" have tasted the cake, and notes that a descendent had explained the omission as familiar enough to not need writing down.

Several preparations of Robert E. Lee cakes are made using baking powder, an ingredient that had only recently entered the kitchens of southern cooks at the time of the cake's invention. With the new ingredient, bakers took the cakes from the English baking tradition that were filled with alcohol and fruit, and reworked them to become lighter and layered. Other cakes that emerged through this process at the time included the Lady Baltimore cake and the Lane cake. These cakes are similar to Robert E. Lee cakes, with only two or three ingredients rendering them distinct; the three are sometimes confused for one another. The preparation of each requires a large amount of time and expense, and they have historically been reserved for celebrations.

Marion Cabell Tyree includes two recipes for Robert E. Lee cake in her 1877 cookbook Housekeeping in Old Virginia. Recipes for the dish continued to appear in many 19th century cookbooks in the American south. By the 1940s, stories around the cake told that it was the favorite of Lee himself. In the 2010s, Robert E. Lee cake continued to be made: numerous recipes could be found on the internet, and according to Levene, some bakers in Virginia continued to pay tribute to Lee by making the cake.

== See also ==
- List of cakes

== Sources ==
- Mosier, Angie (2007). "Cakes". In Wilson, Charles Reagan (ed.). The New Encyclopedia of Southern Culture. Vol. 7: Foodways. Chapel Hill, North Carolina: University of North Carolina Press. ISBN 978-0-8078-3146-5.
- Flexner, Marion (2010) [1949]. Out of Kentucky Kitchens. Lexington, Kentucky: The University Press of Kentucky. ISBN 978-0-8131-9348-9.
- Levene, Alysa (2016). Cake: The Short, Surprising History of Our Favourite Bakes. London: Headline. ISBN 978-1-4722-2684-6.
- Patent, Greg (November 2001). "Boston Cream Pie". Gastronomica. 1 (4). doi:10.1525/gfc.2001.1.4.82.
- Reed, Julia (2004). "Rich and Famous". In Elie, Lolis Eric (ed.). Cornbread Nation 2: The United States of Barbecue. Chapel Hill, North Carolina & London: University of Mississippi. ISBN 0-8078-5556-1.
- Schmidt, Stephen (2013). "Cake". In Smith, Andrew F. (ed.). The Oxford Encyclopedia of Food and Drink in America. Vol. 1 (2nd ed.). New York: Oxford University Press. ISBN 978-0-19-973496-2.
- Sharpless, Rebecca (2013). "The Women of St. Paul's Episcopal Church Were Worried: Transforming Domestic Skills into Saleable Commodities in Texas". In Edge, John T; Engelhardt, Elizabeth S D; Ownby, Ted (eds.). The Larder: Food Studies Methods from the American South. Athens, Georgia & London: The University of Georgia Press. ISBN 978-0-8203-4554-3.
- Zanger, Mark (2003). The American History Cookbook. Westport, Connecticut: Greenwood Press. ISBN 1-57356-376-5.
