= Lane cake =

American cake

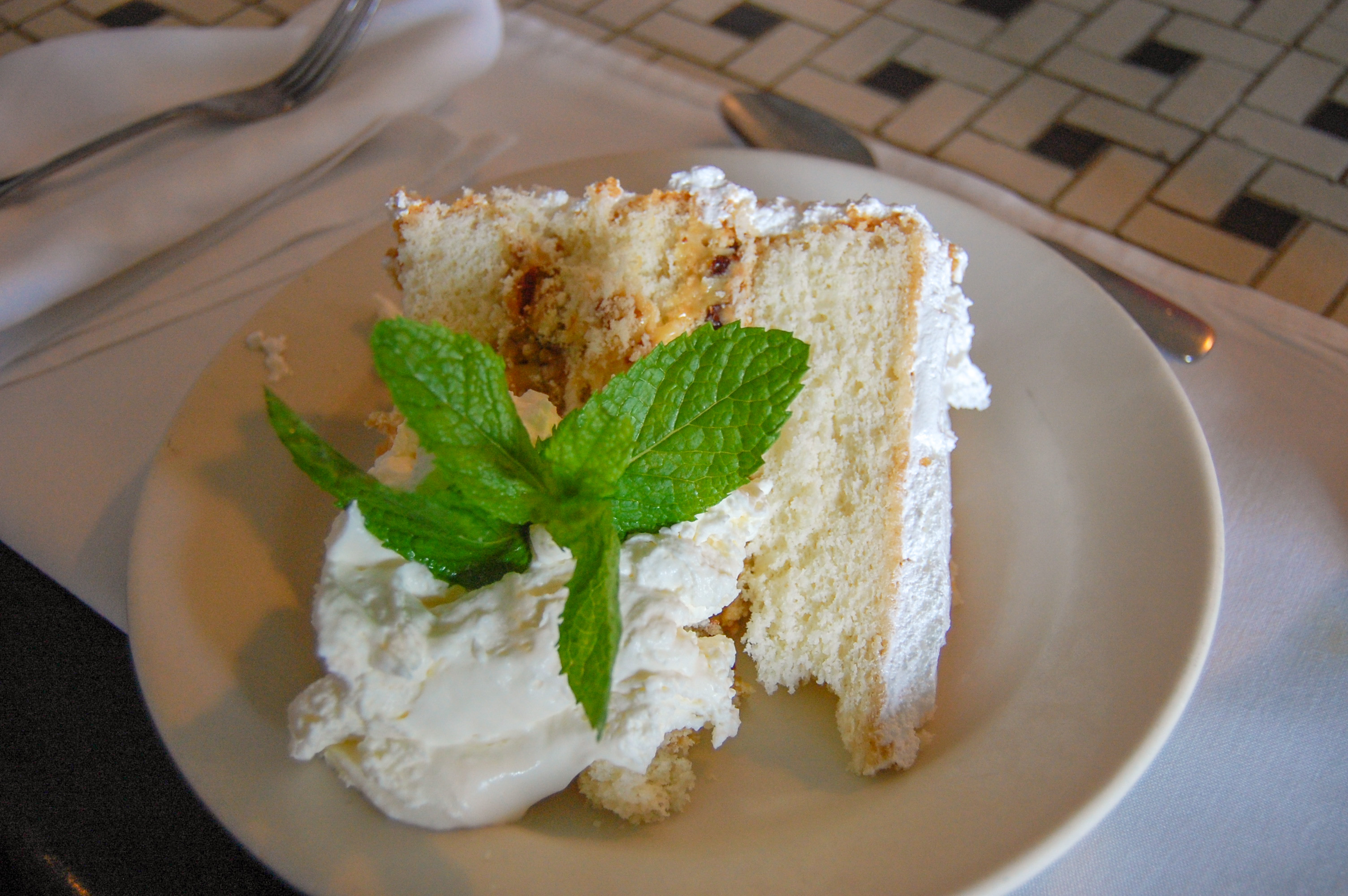
- Alternative names: Prize cake, Alabama lane cake
- Type: Cake
- Place of origin: United States
- Region or state: American South
- Created by: Emma Rylander Lane
- Main ingredients: Sponge cake, candied fruit, raisins, pecans, coconut, bourbon

Lane cake, also known as prize cake or Alabama Lane cake, is a bourbon-laced baked cake traditional in the American South. It was invented or popularized by Emma Rylander Lane (1856–1904), a native and long-time resident of Americus, Georgia, who developed the recipe while living in Clayton, Alabama, in the 1890s. She published the original recipe in Some Good Things to Eat (1898).

The Lane cake is sometimes confused with the Lady Baltimore cake, which also is a liquor-laden fruit-filled cake. While the Lane cake originated in Alabama, the Lady Baltimore came from Charleston. Sisters Florrie and Nina Ottolengui, managers of the Women's Exchange Tea tearoom are credited with developing it.

Many variations of the Lane cake now exist, with three or more layers of white sponge cake, separated by a filling that typically includes pecans, raisins and coconut soaked in a generous amount of bourbon, wine or brandy. It may be frosted on the top, on the sides, or both.

Lane cake is often found in the South at receptions, holiday dinners, or wedding showers.

== Original recipe and adaptations ==
The original recipe in Some Good Things to Eat (1898) states:

8 egg whites, 1 cup (~240 mL) butter, 1 cup (~240 mL) sweet milk, 2 cups (~480 mL) sifted sugar, 3+1/4 cups (~720 mL) sifted flour, 2 tsp (10 mL) baking powder, 1 tbsp (15 mL) vanilla.

Sift the flour and baking powder together three times, cream the butter and sugar until perfectly light, add to it alternately, little at a time, milk and flour, until all are used, beginning and ending with flour. Last, beat in the well whipped whites and vanilla. Bake in four layers, using medium sized pie tins, with one layer of ungreased brown paper in the bottom of each tin.

Filling.—Beat well together eight egg yolks, one large cup of sugar, and half a cup of butter. Pour into a small, deep stew pan and cook on top of the stove until quite thick, stirring all the time, or it will be sure to burn. When done and while still hot, put in one cup of seeded and finely clipped raisins, one wine-glass of good whiskey or brandy and one teaspoon of vanilla. Spread thickly between the layers and ice. It is much better to make a day or two before using. My prize cake, and named not from my own conceit, but through the courtesy of Mrs. Janie McDowell Pruett, of Eufaula, Ala.

The cake has a reputation as being difficult to make, but modern equipment and ingredients have simplified the process. When the recipe originated, there were no stand or electric hand mixers. Even hand-crank eggbeaters were not widely available. Bakers put in much hard labor beating the egg whites to frothy soft peaks. The cakes had to be watched carefully during baking because the wood-fired ovens had no thermostats. The pecans, raisins, and coconut were chopped by hand or put through a meat grinder. Today an electric food processor might be used. Because the filling can be quickly chilled in a refrigerator, it is now easier to produce a stiff filling that will hold up the multi-layer cake without the layers sliding.

Recipes for Lane cake vary because so many Southern cooks fiercely guarded their recipes, passing them down from generation to generation to recreate the family tradition. One such cook, Atlanta baker and Alabama native Lise Ode, wrote about her work to create a recipe that matched her memories. Professional chef Tori Avey includes a recipe for Lane cake on her website complete with pictures of each step. Although it is difficult to locate a copy of Emma Rylander Lane's original cookbook or the revised edition published in 1989, Some Good Things to Eat, the recipe can be found in many older cookbooks. The Purefoy Hotel Cook Book published in 1953 has the recipe for Lane cake appearing on page 123–124.

Krystina Castella and Terry Lee Stone include a recipe for Lane cake in their cookbook Booze Cakes: Confections Spiked With Spirits, Wine, and Beer which uses 2 tbsp (30 mL) of bourbon in the cake, 1 cup (~240 mL) in the filling, and a buttercream frosting made from 1 cup (~240 mL) unsalted butter, 1/4 cup (~60 mL) half-and-half, 3 cups (~720 mL) confectioner's sugar, 1/4 cup (~60 mL) bourbon, and 1/4 tsp (1 mL) salt.

The original recipe for Lane cake called for 1/4 cup (~60 mL) bourbon added to the filling mixture only, although the bourbon was sometimes replaced with grape juice by cooks who didn't want to use alcohol. Whisky, wine, and brandy are mentioned in other recipes. Other Lane cake bakers took great pride in using a homemade liqueur, such as scuppernong wine, a wine made from scuppernong grapes that grew plentifully in the southeastern United States. These special additions made their cakes novel and hard to copy. Because Lane cakes improve with age, many bakers placed the finished Lane cake in a covered tin and allowed it to "set" for up to a week before serving, in order for the spongy cake to "soak up" the flavor. Some also wrapped the unfrosted cake in a cloth that had been soaked in the bourbon, brandy, wine, or grape juice while it set in a cool place, often in a bowl set inside a dishpan and then covered. It was then frosted with 7-minute boiled icing or other whipped white frosting, usually a day or more before serving.

== In American culture ==
In Harper Lee's To Kill a Mockingbird, a Lane cake is given as a welcome gift to Aunt Alexandra by Miss Maudie Atkinson. The narrator in the story is the young daughter, Scout, of Atticus Finch. Scout reports, "Miss Maudie baked a Lane cake so loaded with shinny it made me tight", "shinny" being a slang term for moonshine, and "tight" suggesting feeling the effects of the alcohol. Also in To Kill a Mockingbird, Miss Maudie bakes a Lane cake for Mr. Avery, who was severely injured in an attempt to put out a fire in her home. “Soon as I can get my hands clean and when Stephanie Crawford’s not looking, I’ll make him a Lane cake. That Stephanie’s been after my recipe for thirty years, and if she thinks I’ll give it to her just because I’m staying with her she’s got another think coming.”

In Jimmy Carter's memoir Christmas in Plains, he writes: "I guess it would be more accurate to say that Mama never liked to cook, and welcomed my father into the kitchen whenever he was willing. He was always the one who prepared batter cakes or waffles for breakfast, and he would even make a couple of Lane cakes for Christmas. Since this cake recipe required a strong dose of bourbon, it was just for the adult relatives, doctors, nurses, and other friends who would be invited to our house for eggnog."

In May 2016, Lane cake was voted the official state cake of Alabama.

== See also ==
- List of regional dishes of the United States
- Robert E. Lee cake
- Tipsy cake

== Relevant literature ==
- Kutzler, Evan A. 2023. From Biscuits to Lane Cake: Emma Rylander Lane's "Some Good Things to Eat." Mercer University Press. ISBN 978-0881469028
