= Darius Philon =

American football player (born 1994)

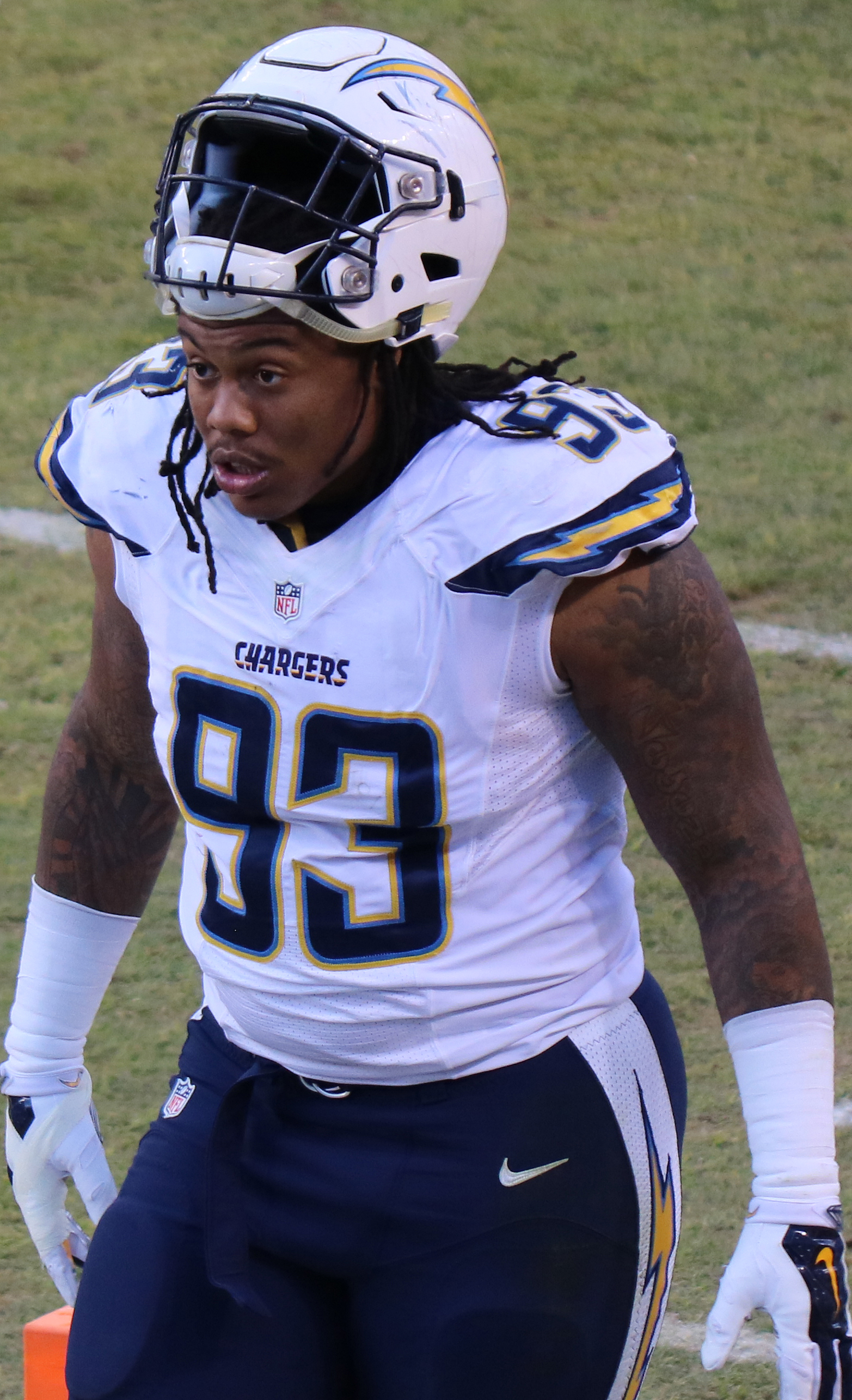
- Philon with the San Diego Chargers in 2015

No. 93, 96
- Position: Defensive tackle

Personal information
- Born: January 22, 1994 (age 32); Mobile, Alabama, U.S.
- Listed height: 6 ft 1 in (1.85 m)
- Listed weight: 286 lb (130 kg)

Career information
- High school: Vigor (Prichard, Alabama)
- College: Arkansas (2012–2014)
- NFL draft: 2015: 6th round, 192nd overall pick

Career history
- San Diego / Los Angeles Chargers (2015–2018); Arizona Cardinals (2019)*; Las Vegas Raiders (2021)
- * Offseason or practice squad member only

Awards and highlights
- Second-team All-SEC (2014)

Career NFL statistics
- Total tackles: 107
- Sacks: 11.5
- Forced fumbles: 2
- Fumble recoveries: 2
- Stats at Pro Football Reference

Darius Philon (born January 22, 1994) is an American former professional football player who was a defensive tackle in the National Football League (NFL). He played college football for the Arkansas Razorbacks, and was selected by the San Diego Chargers in the sixth round of the 2015 NFL draft.

== Professional career ==
Pre-draft measurables
Height	Weight	Arm length	Hand span	40-yard dash	10-yard split	20-yard split	Three-cone drill	Vertical jump	Broad jump	Bench press
6 ft 1 3/8 in (1.86 m)	298 lb (135 kg)	32 3/8 in (0.82 m)	9 1/2 in (0.24 m)	5.00 s	1.78 s	2.95 s	8.00 s	31 in (0.79 m)	8 ft 11 in (2.72 m)	26 reps
All values from NFL Combine

=== San Diego / Los Angeles Chargers ===
Philon was selected by the San Diego Chargers in the sixth round (192nd overall) of the 2015 NFL draft. On October 17, 2015, he was placed on injured reserve. On December 12, 2015, he was reactivated.

=== Arizona Cardinals ===
On March 21, 2019, Philon signed a two-year contract with the Arizona Cardinals. On August 10, 2019, he was released by the team following his arrest for an assault with a deadly weapon.

=== Las Vegas Raiders ===
Philon signed with the Las Vegas Raiders on March 22, 2021. He played in six games before being placed on injured reserve on November 10, but rejoined the active roster on December 11. He suffered a torn patellar tendon in Week 18 and was placed on injured reserve on January 11, 2022.

== NFL career statistics ==
Legend
**Bold**	Career high

=== Regular season ===
Year	Team	Games		Tackles					Interceptions					Fumbles			
Year	Team	GP	GS	Cmb	Solo	Ast	Sck	TFL	Int	Yds	TD	Lng	PD	FF	FR	Yds	TD
2015	SDG	8	0	5	4	1	0.0	2	0	0	0	0	1	0	0	0	0
2016	SDG	14	2	11	7	4	1.0	0	0	0	0	0	0	0	0	0	0
2017	LAC	16	4	31	16	**15**	**4.5**	**7**	0	0	0	0	1	**1**	0	0	0
2018	LAC	16	13	**33**	**19**	14	4.0	**7**	0	0	0	0	0	**1**	0	0	0
2021	LVR	11	2	27	**19**	8	2.0	5	0	0	0	0	**2**	0	**2**	**2**	0
		65	21	107	65	42	11.5	21	0	0	0	0	4	2	2	2	0

=== Postseason ===
Year	Team	Games		Tackles					Interceptions					Fumbles			
Year	Team	GP	GS	Cmb	Solo	Ast	Sck	TFL	Int	Yds	TD	Lng	PD	FF	FR	Yds	TD
2018	LAC	2	0	3	3	0	0.0	1	0	0	0	0	0	0	0	0	0
		2	0	3	3	0	0.0	1	0	0	0	0	0	0	0	0	0
