= 2015 San Diego Chargers season =

NFL team 56th season

- Owner: Alex Spanos
- General manager: Tom Telesco
- Head coach: Mike McCoy
- Home stadium: Qualcomm Stadium

Results
- Record: 4–12
- Division place: 4th AFC West
- Playoffs: Did not qualify
- All-Pros: None
- Pro Bowlers: 1: CB Jason Verrett

The 2015 season was the San Diego Chargers' 46th in the National Football League (NFL), their 56th overall and their third under head coach Mike McCoy. The team had its worst season since 2003 with a 4–12 record. 9 of their 12 losses were by eight points or less. The high moment of the season was in Week 1, where they erased a 21–3 deficit and upset the Lions, 33–28.

== Offseason ==
=== Signings ===
Position	Player	2014 Team	Contract
G	Orlando Franklin	Denver Broncos	5 years, $36.5 million
WR	Stevie Johnson	San Francisco 49ers	3 years, $10.5 million
DB	Jimmy Wilson	Miami Dolphins	2 years, $4.25 million
CB	Patrick Robinson	New Orleans Saints	1 year, $2 million
DE	Mitch Unrein	Denver Broncos	2 years, $1.9 million
RT	Joe Barksdale	St. Louis Rams	1 year, $1.095 million
LT	Chris Hairston	Buffalo Bills	1 year, $685,000

=== Departures ===
Position	Player	2015 Team
SS	Marcus Gilchrist	New York Jets
C	Nick Hardwick	Retired
WR	Eddie Royal	Chicago Bears
RB	Ryan Mathews	Philadelphia Eagles
DE	Dwight Freeney	Arizona Cardinals
G	Jeromey Clary	Retired
OLB	Andrew Gachkar	Dallas Cowboys
CB	Shareece Wright	San Francisco 49ers
K	Nick Novak	Houston Texans
RB	Ronnie Brown	Retired
WR	Seyi Ajirotutu	Philadelphia Eagles

== NFL draft ==
2015 San Diego Chargers draft
Round	Pick	Player	Position	College	Notes
1	15	Melvin Gordon *	RB	Wisconsin	
2	48	Denzel Perryman *	LB	Miami (FL)	
3	83	Craig Mager	CB	Texas St	
4	None – see draft trades below				
5	153	Kyle Emanuel	DE	North Dakota St	
6	192	Darius Philon	DT	Arkansas	
7	None – see draft trades below				
Made roster † Pro Football Hall of Fame * Made at least one Pro Bowl during career

Notes

- The Chargers traded their fourth-round selection (No. 117 overall) and 2016 fifth-round selection to the San Francisco 49ers to move up in the first round to select Melvin Gordon.
- The Chargers traded their seventh-round selection (No. 236 overall) to the Dallas Cowboys in exchange for defensive tackle Sean Lissemore.

== Staff ==
2015 San Diego Chargers staff
Front office: Owner – Alex Spanos; Minority owner – George Pernicano; Chairman/president – Dean Spanos; Executive vice president – Michael Spanos; CEO/president - Business Operations – A. G. Spanos; General manager – Tom Telesco; President - football operations – John Spanos; Executive vice president of football administration/player finance – Ed McGuire; Senior executive – Randy Mueller; Director of pro scouting – Dennis Abraham; Director of player personnel – JoJo Wooden; Director of college scouting – Kevin Kelly; Assistant director of pro scouting – Bryan Cox; Head coaches: Head coach – Mike McCoy; Offensive coaches: Offensive coordinator – Frank Reich; Quarterbacks – Nick Sirianni; Running backs – Ollie Wilson; Wide receivers – Fred Graves; Tight ends – Pete Metzelaars; Offensive line – Joe D'Alessandris; Assistant offensive line – Andrew Dees; Offensive quality control – Shane Steichen	Defensive coaches: Defensive coordinator – John Pagano; Defensive line – Don Johnson; Linebackers – Mike Nolan; Assistant linebackers – Bobby King; Secondary – Ron Milus; Assistant secondary – Greg Williams; Defensive quality control – Chris Shula; Special teams coaches: Special teams coordinator – Craig Aukerman; Strength and conditioning: Strength and conditioning – Kent Johnston; Assistant strength and conditioning – Rick Lyle; Coaching administrative assistant – Mark Ridgley

== Final roster ==
2015 San Diego Chargers roster
Quarterbacks (QB): 10 Kellen Clemens; 17 Philip Rivers; Running backs (RB): 34 Donald Brown; 36 Dreamius Smith; 39 Danny Woodhead; Wide receivers (WR): 80 Malcom Floyd; 81 Javontee Herndon; 15 Dontrelle Inman; 11 Stevie Johnson; 16 Tyrell Williams; Tight ends (TE): 45 Asante Cleveland; 88 David Johnson; 85 Antonio Gates; 84 Sean McGrath; 83 John Phillips	Offensive linemen (OL): 72 Joe Barksdale T; 78 Tyreek Burwell T; 77 King Dunlap T; 74 Orlando Franklin G; 76 D. J. Fluker G; 75 Chris Hairston T/G; 70 Jeff Linkenbach T; 60 Trevor Robinson C; 66 J. D. Walton C; 79 Kenny Wiggins G; Defensive linemen (DL): 92 Ryan Carrethers NT; 90 Ricardo Mathews DE; 93 Darius Philon DE; 91 Kendall Reyes DE; 71 Damion Square DE	Linebackers (LB): 97 Jeremiah Attaochu OLB; 56 Donald Butler ILB; 53 Kavell Conner LB; 48 Nick Dzubnar ILB; 51 Kyle Emanuel OLB; 54 Melvin Ingram OLB; 99 Cordarro Law OLB; 57 Joe Mays ILB; 52 Denzel Perryman ILB; 50 Manti Te'o ILB; Defensive backs (DB): 37 Jahleel Addae SS; 30 Matt Daniels FS; 33 Greg Ducre CB; 29 Craig Mager CB; 31 Adrian Phillips FS; 26 Patrick Robinson CB; 27 Brandian Ross SS; 20 Cassius Vaughn CB; 22 Jason Verrett CB; 23 Steve Williams CB; Special teams (ST): 2 Josh Lambo K; 5 Mike Scifres P; 47 Mike Windt LS	Practice squad: 82 Alex Bayer TE (IR); 12 Isaiah Burse WR; 35 Richard Crawford CB; 49 Ben Gardner DE; 69 Michael Huey G; 41 Keith Lewis CB; 73 Andrew McDonald T; 96 Chuka Ndulue DT; 87 Tim Semisch TE; 4 Brad Sorensen QB; 64 Craig Watts G; Reserve: 13 Keenan Allen WR (IR); 40 Ikechi Ariguzo ILB (IR); 24 Brandon Flowers CB (IR); 28 Melvin Gordon RB (IR); 89 Ladarius Green TE (IR); 59 Brock Hekking OLB (IR); 98 Sean Lissemore NT (IR); 94 Corey Liuget DE (IR); 43 Branden Oliver RB (IR); 95 Tenny Palepoi DT (IR); 25 Darrell Stuckey FS (IR); 63 Johnnie Troutman G (IR); 65 Chris Watt C (IR); 32 Eric Weddle FS (IR); 58 Tourek Williams OLB (IR); Rookies in italics 53 active, 16 reserve, 10 practice squad

== Schedule ==
=== Preseason ===
Week	Date	Opponent	Result	Record	Venue	Recap
1	August 13	Dallas Cowboys	**W** 17–7	1–0	Qualcomm Stadium	Recap
2	August 22	at Arizona Cardinals	**W** 22–19	2–0	University of Phoenix Stadium	Recap
3	August 29	Seattle Seahawks	**L** 15–16	2–1	Qualcomm Stadium	Recap
4	September 3	at San Francisco 49ers	**L** 12–14	2–2	Levi's Stadium	Recap

=== Regular season ===
Week	Date	Opponent	Result	Record	Venue	Recap
1	September 13	Detroit Lions	**W** 33–28	1–0	Qualcomm Stadium	Recap
2	September 20	at Cincinnati Bengals	**L** 19–24	1–1	Paul Brown Stadium	Recap
3	September 27	at Minnesota Vikings	**L** 14–31	1–2	TCF Bank Stadium	Recap
4	October 4	Cleveland Browns	**W** 30–27	2–2	Qualcomm Stadium	Recap
5	October 12	Pittsburgh Steelers	**L** 20–24	2–3	Qualcomm Stadium	Recap
6	October 18	at Green Bay Packers	**L** 20–27	2–4	Lambeau Field	Recap
7	October 25	**Oakland Raiders**	**L** 29–37	2–5	Qualcomm Stadium	Recap
8	November 1	at Baltimore Ravens	**L** 26–29	2–6	M&T Bank Stadium	Recap
9	November 9	Chicago Bears	**L** 19–22	2–7	Qualcomm Stadium	Recap
10	Bye					
11	November 22	**Kansas City Chiefs**	**L** 3–33	2–8	Qualcomm Stadium	Recap
12	November 29	at Jacksonville Jaguars	**W** 31–25	3–8	EverBank Field	Recap
13	December 6	**Denver Broncos**	**L** 3–17	3–9	Qualcomm Stadium	Recap
14	December 13	at **Kansas City Chiefs**	**L** 3–10	3–10	Arrowhead Stadium	Recap
15	December 20	Miami Dolphins	**W** 30–14	4–10	Qualcomm Stadium	Recap
16	December 24	at **Oakland Raiders**	**L** 20–23 (OT)	4–11	O.co Coliseum	Recap
17	January 3	at **Denver Broncos**	**L** 20–27	4–12	Sports Authority Field at Mile High	Recap

Note: Intra-division opponents are in bold text.

=== Game summaries ===
==== Week 1: vs. Detroit Lions ====
Week One: Detroit Lions at San Diego Chargers – Game summary

Quarter	1	2	3	4	Total
Lions	7	14	0	7	**28**
**Chargers**	3	7	10	13	**33**

at Qualcomm Stadium, San Diego, California

- Date: September 13
- Game time: 1:05 p.m. PDT
- Game weather: 84 °F (29 °C), sunny
- Game attendance: 66,093
- Referee: Clete Blakeman
- TV announcers (Fox): Thom Brennaman, Charles Davis and Tony Siragusa
- Recap, Gamebook

Game information

**First quarter**

- DET – Ameer Abdullah 24-yard run (Matt Prater kick), 10:46. Lions 7–0. **Drive: 8 plays, 80 yards, 4:14.**
- SDG – Josh Lambo 32-yard field goal, 0:22. Lions 7–3. **Drive: 13 plays, 73 yards, 7:02.**

**Second quarter**

- DET – Glover Quin 31-yard interception return (Matt Prater kick), 12:28. Lions 14–3. **Drive: 3 plays, 9 yards, 1:32.**
- DET – Eric Ebron 18-yard pass from Matthew Stafford (Matt Prater kick), 8:49. Lions 21–3. **Drive: 4 plays, 46 yards, 2:06.**
- SDG – Danny Woodhead 9-yard run (Josh Lambo kick), 5:02. Lions 21–10. **Drive: 7 plays, 80 yards, 3:47.**

**Third quarter**

- SDG – Josh Lambo 25-yard field goal, 9:21. Lions 21–13. **Drive: 12 plays, 73 yards, 5:39.**
- SDG – Stevie Johnson 12-yard pass from Philip Rivers (Josh Lambo kick), 4:03. Lions 21–20. **Drive: 3 plays, 16 yards, 1:12.**

**Fourth quarter**

- SDG – Ladarius Green 13-yard pass from Philip Rivers (Josh Lambo kick), 11:49. Chargers 26–21. **Drive: 7 plays, 70 yards, 3:52.**
- SDG – Danny Woodhead 1-yard run (Josh Lambo kick), 2:33. Chargers 33–21. **Drive: 11 plays, 86 yards, 6:18.**
- DET – Theo Riddick 21-yard pass from Matthew Stafford (Matt Prater kick), 1:04. Chargers 33–28. **Drive: 7 plays, 83 yards, 1:29.**

**Top passers**

- DET – Matthew Stafford – 19/30, 246 yards, 2 TD, 2 INT
- SDG – Philip Rivers – 35/42, 404 yards, 2 TD, 2 INT

**Top rushers**

- DET – Ameer Abdullah – 7 rushes, 50 yards, TD
- SDG – Melvin Gordon – 14 rushes, 51 yards

**Top receivers**

- DET – Eric Ebron – 4 receptions, 53 yds, TD
- SDG – Keenan Allen – 15 receptions, 166 yards

The Chargers started their season at home against the Lions. After falling behind 21-10 at halftime, the Bolts managed to outscore the Lions 23-7 in the second half of the game and win it 33-28.

With the win, the Chargers started their season 1-0 and improved to 5-0 all-time at home against Detroit.

==== Week 2: at Cincinnati Bengals ====
Week Two: San Diego Chargers at Cincinnati Bengals – Game summary

Quarter	1	2	3	4	Total
Chargers	3	3	7	6	**19**
**Bengals**	7	7	3	7	**24**

at Paul Brown Stadium, Cincinnati, Ohio

- Date: September 20
- Game time: 1:00 p.m. EDT/10:00 am. PDT
- Game weather: 69 °F (21 °C), partly cloudy
- Game attendance: 57,579
- Referee: Jeff Triplette
- TV announcers (CBS): Ian Eagle, Dan Fouts and Evan Washburn
- Preview, Gamebook

Game information

**First quarter**

- CIN – A. J. Green 16-yard pass from Andy Dalton (Mike Nugent kick), 12:51. Bengals 7–0. **Drive: 2 plays, 19 yards, 0:45.**
- SDG – Josh Lambo 40-yard field goal, 8:38. Bengals 7–3. **Drive: 9 plays, 57 yards, 4:13.**

**Second quarter**

- SDG – Josh Lambo 32-yard field goal, 9:24. Bengals 7–6. **Drive: 9 plays, 60 yards, 5:19.**
- CIN – Marvin Jones 45-yard pass from Andy Dalton (Mike Nugent kick), 6:01. Bengals 14–6. **Drive: 6 plays, 84 yards, 3:23.**

**Third quarter**

- SDG – Stevie Johnson 10-yard pass from Philip Rivers (Josh Lambo kick), 10:34. Bengals 14–13. **Drive: 8 plays, 78 yards, 4:26.**
- CIN – Mike Nugent 21-yard field goal, 2:44. Bengals 17–13. **Drive: 10 plays, 60 yards, 3:14.**

**Fourth quarter**

- CIN – Tyler Eifert 9-yard pass from Andy Dalton (Mike Nugent kick), 8:49. Bengals 24–13. **Drive: 6 plays, 38 yards, 2:05.**
- SDG – Malcom Floyd 40-yard pass from Philip Rivers (pass failed), 4:20. Bengals 24–19. **Drive: 10 plays, 80 yards, 4:29.**

**Top passers**

- SDG – Philip Rivers – 21/27, 241 yards, 2 TD, INT
- CIN – Andy Dalton – 16/26, 214 yards, 3 TD

**Top rushers**

- SDG – Melvin Gordon – 16 carries, 88 yards
- CIN – Giovani Bernard – 20 carries, 123 yards

**Top receivers**

- SDG – Danny Woodhead – 6 receptions, 68 yards
- CIN – Tyler Eifert – 4 receptions, 49 yards, 1 TD

The Chargers would trail all game, and tried to come back towards the end of the game, but Philip Rivers threw an interception, sealing the game. With the loss, the Chargers fell to 1-1.

==== Week 3: at Minnesota Vikings ====
Week Three: San Diego Chargers at Minnesota Vikings – Game summary

Quarter	1	2	3	4	Total
Chargers	0	7	0	7	**14**
**Vikings**	3	7	14	7	**31**

at TCF Bank Stadium, Minneapolis, Minnesota

- Date: September 27
- Game time: 12:00 p.m. CDT/10:00 am. PDT
- Game weather: 75 °F (24 °C), sunny
- Game attendance: 52,400
- Referee: Terry McAulay
- TV announcers (CBS): Ian Eagle, Dan Fouts and Evan Washburn
- Recap, Gamebook

Game information

**First quarter**

- MIN – Blair Walsh 24-yard field goal, 1:15. Vikings 3–0. **Drive: 4 plays, 7 yards, 1:31.**

**Second quarter**

- MIN – Adrian Peterson 2-yard run (Blair Walsh kick), 9:05. Vikings 10–0. **Drive: 11 plays, 67 yards, 5:39.**
- SDG – Keenan Allen 34-yard pass from Philip Rivers (Josh Lambo kick), 1:17. Vikings 10–7. **Drive: 9 plays, 90 yards, 2:17.**

**Third quarter**

- MIN – Adrian Peterson 43-yard run (Blair Walsh kick), 12:32. Vikings 17–7. **Drive: 1 play, 43 yards, 0:12.**
- MIN – Zach Line 1-yard run (Blair Walsh kick), 2:42. Vikings 24–7. **Drive: 16 plays, 86 yards, 7:19.**

**Fourth quarter**

- MIN – Chad Greenway 91-yard interception return (Blair Walsh kick), 13:57. Vikings 31–7.
- SDG – Keenan Allen 19-yard pass from Kellen Clemens (Josh Lambo kick), 0:32. Vikings 31–14. **Drive: 14 plays, 89 yards, 8:05.**

**Top passers**

- SDG – Philip Rivers – 21/34, 246 yards, TD, INT
- MIN – Teddy Bridgewater – 13/24, 121 yards, INT

**Top rushers**

- SDG – Melvin Gordon – 14 rushes, 51 yards
- MIN – Adrian Peterson – 20 rushes, 126 yards, 2 TD

**Top receivers**

- SDG – Keenan Allen – 12 receptions, 133 yards, 2 TD
- MIN – Mike Wallace – 3 receptions, 49 yards

The Chargers once again would never lead during the game. The game was officially sealed when Chad Greenway returned an interception 91 yards down the sidelines for a touchdown. Adrian Peterson would rush for 126 yards on 20 attempts, including a 43-yard touchdown early in the third quarter on a play in which he ran through Charger defenders. With the loss, the Chargers fell to 1-2.

==== Week 4: vs. Cleveland Browns ====
Week Four: Cleveland Browns at San Diego Chargers – Game summary

Quarter	1	2	3	4	Total
Browns	3	10	3	11	**27**
**Chargers**	7	6	7	10	**30**

at Qualcomm Stadium, San Diego, California

- Date: October 4
- Game time: 1:05 pm. PDT
- Game weather: 68 °F (20 °C), cloudy
- Game attendance: 63,710
- Referee: Bill Vinovich
- TV announcers (CBS): Andrew Catalon, Steve Beuerlein, Steve Tasker and Scott Kaplan
- Recap, Gamebook

Game information

**First quarter**

- CLE – Travis Coons 36-yard field goal, 4:12. Browns 3–0. **Drive: 11 plays, 64 yards, 6:24.**
- SDG – Keenan Allen 28-yard pass from Philip Rivers (Josh Lambo kick), 0:48. Chargers 7–3. **Drive: 8 plays, 80 yards, 3:24.**

**Second quarter**

- CLE – Duke Johnson 34-yard pass from Josh McCown (Travis Coons kick), 14:10. Browns 10–7. **Drive: 4 plays, 80 yards, 1:38.**
- SDG – Josh Lambo 46-yard field goal, 10:37. Tied 10–10. **Drive: 9 plays, 56 yards, 3:33.**
- SDG – Josh Lambo 45-yard field goal, 1:36. Chargers 13–10. **Drive: 10 plays, 60 yards, 1:59.**
- CLE – Travis Coons 28-yard field goal, 0:03. Tied 13–13. **Drive: 9 plays, 70 yards, 1:33.**

**Third quarter**

- CLE – Travis Coons 33-yard field goal, 5:54. Browns 16–13. **Drive: 9 plays, 68 yards, 5:25.**
- SDG – Ladarius Green 19-yard pass from Philip Rivers (Josh Lambo kick), 4:23. Chargers 20–16. **Drive: 3 plays, 81 yards, 1:31.**

**Fourth quarter**

- CLE – Travis Coons 40-yard field goal, 9:57. Chargers 20–19. **Drive: 9 plays, 40 yards, 5:03.**
- SDG – John Phillips 1-yard pass from Philip Rivers (Josh Lambo kick), 7:26. Chargers 27–19. **Drive: 5 plays, 74 yards, 2:31.**
- CLE – Gary Barnidge 1-yard pass from Josh McCown (Taylor Gabriel pass from Josh McCown), 2:09. Tied 27–27. **Drive: 10 plays, 67 yards, 5:17.**
- SDG – Josh Lambo 34-yard field goal, 0:00. Chargers 30–27. **Drive: 8 plays, 57 yards, 2:09.**

**Top passers**

- CLE – Josh McCown – 32/41, 356 yards, 2 TD
- SDG – Philip Rivers – 23/38, 358 yards, 3 TD

**Top rushers**

- CLE – Isaiah Crowell – 12 rushes, 63 yards
- SDG – Danny Woodhead – 8 rushes, 54 yards

**Top receivers**

- CLE – Duke Johnson – 9 receptions, 85 yards, TD
- SDG – Dontrelle Inman – 3 receptions, 88 yards

The Browns would go down to tie the game with a touchdown and a 2-point conversion. The Chargers would then get into field goal range for kicker Josh Lambo. Lambo attempted a 39-yard attempt, but the kick was no good, and the game appeared to be heading to overtime. However, the Browns were flagged for being offsides, as Tramon Williams jumped before the ball was snapped. The penalty gave Lambo a chance at redemption. This time, Lambo drilled the game-winning 34-yard field goal to give the Chargers the win. With the win, the Chargers improved to 2-2.

==== Week 5: vs. Pittsburgh Steelers ====
Week Five: Pittsburgh Steelers at San Diego Chargers – Game summary

Quarter	1	2	3	4	Total
**Steelers**	0	3	7	14	**24**
Chargers	7	0	0	13	**20**

at Qualcomm Stadium, San Diego, California

- Date: October 12
- Game time: 5:30 pm. PDT
- Game weather: 93 °F (34 °C), partly cloudy
- Game attendance: 67,658
- Referee: Pete Morelli
- TV announcers (ESPN): Mike Tirico, Jon Gruden and Lisa Salters
- Recap, Gamebook

Game information

**First quarter**

- SDG – Antonio Gates 12-yard pass from Philip Rivers (Josh Lambo kick), 9:50. Chargers 7–0. **Drive: 5 plays, 84 yards, 2:22.**

**Second quarter**

- PIT – Chris Boswell 47-yard field goal, 4:24. Chargers 7–3. **Drive: 9 plays, 47 yards, 5:38.**

**Third quarter**

- PIT – Antwon Blake 70-yard interception return (Chris Boswell kick), 3:21. Steelers 10–7.

**Fourth quarter**

- SDG – Josh Lambo 40-yard field goal, 14:49. Tied 10–10. **Drive: 8 plays, 58 yards, 3:32.**
- SDG – Antonio Gates 11-yard pass from Philip Rivers (Josh Lambo kick), 8:02. Chargers 17–10. **Drive: 8 plays, 60 yards, 5:50.**
- PIT – Markus Wheaton 72-yard pass from Michael Vick (Chris Boswell kick), 7:42. Tied 17–17. **Drive: 1 play, 72 yards, 0:20.**
- SDG – Josh Lambo 54-yard field goal, 2:56. Chargers 17–10. **Drive: 12 plays, 44 yards, 4:46.**
- PIT - Le'Veon Bell 1-yard run (Chris Boswell kick), 0:00. Steelers 24–20. **Drive: 12 plays, 80 yards, 2:56.**

**Top passers**

- PIT – Michael Vick – 13/26, 203 yards, TD, INT
- SDG – Philip Rivers – 35/48, 365 yards, 2 TD INT

**Top rushers**

- PIT – Le'Veon Bell – 21 rushes, 111 yards, TD
- SDG – Melvin Gordon – 15 rushes, 42 yards

**Top receivers**

- PIT – Markus Wheaton – 1 receptions, 72 yards, TD
- SDG – Antonio Gates – 9 receptions, 92 yards, 2 TD

The Chargers took the lead after Josh Lambo made a 54-yard field goal with 2:56 remaining in the game. However, the Steelers, led by Michael Vick, were able to march all the way down the field to score as time expired. The final play came on a wildcat formation call, as running back Le'Veon Bell took the direct snap and rushed in for the game winner as the clock expired. The play was reviewed, and the call stood, giving Pittsburgh the win. This game is also notable for the number of Steeler fans that showed up to the game. According to the attendance, there were over 1,000 Steeler fans in the crowd during this game, and whenever the Steelers would score, terrible towels would be waved all over the place, as if the game was being held at Heinz Field. With the loss, the Chargers fell to 2-3.

==== Week 6: at Green Bay Packers ====
Week Six: San Diego Chargers at Green Bay Packers – Game summary

Quarter	1	2	3	4	Total
Chargers	3	7	7	3	**20**
**Packers**	14	3	7	3	**27**

at Lambeau Field, Green Bay, Wisconsin

- Date: October 18
- Game time: 3:25 pm. CDT/1:25 pm. PDT
- Game weather: 54 °F (12 °C), clear
- Game attendance: 78,434
- Referee: Walt Anderson
- TV announcers (CBS): Jim Nantz, Phil Simms and Tracy Wolfson
- Recap, Gamebook

Game information

**First quarter**

- GB – James Starks 5-yard pass from Aaron Rodgers (Mason Crosby kick), 8:38. Packers 7–0. **Drive: 8 plays, 87 yards, 3:45.**
- SDG – Josh Lambo 36-yard field goal, 3:17. Packers 7–3. **Drive: 14 plays, 62 yards, 5:21.**
- GB – James Starks 65-yard run, (Mason Crosby kick), 1:51. Packers 14–3. **Drive: 4 plays, 85 yards, 1:26.**

**Second quarter**

- GB – Mason Crosby 23-yard field goal, 6:48. Packers 17–3. **Drive: 10 plays, 83 yards, 3:58.**
- SDG – Dontrelle Inman 1-yard pass from Philip Rivers, (Josh Lambo kick), 0:00. Packers 17–10. **Drive: 12 plays, 88 yards, 4:47.**

**Third quarter**

- SDG – Ladarius Green 19-yard pass from Philip Rivers, (Josh Lambo kick), 9:24. Packers 17–17. **Drive: 8 plays, 79 yards, 4:11.**
- GB – James Jones 8-yard pass from Aaron Rodgers, (Mason Crosby kick), 0:46. Packers 24–17. **Drive: 7 plays, 69 yards, 2:48.**

**Fourth quarter**

- SDG – Josh Lambo 32-yard field goal, 11:10. Packers 24–20. **Drive: 10 plays, 63 yards, 4:36.**
- GB – Mason Crosby 28-yard field goal, 2:37. Packers 27–20. **Drive: 9 plays, 70 yards, 3:37.**

**Top passers**

- SDG – Philip Rivers – 43/65, 503 yards, 2 TDs
- GB – Aaron Rodgers – 16/29, 255 yards, 2 TDs

**Top rushers**

- SDG – Melvin Gordon – 7 rushes, 29 yards
- GB – James Starks – 10 rushes, 112 yards, TD

**Top receivers**

- SDG – Keenan Allen – 14 receptions, 157 yards
- GB – Jeff Janis – 2 receptions, 79 yards

The Chargers travel to Lambeau Field to take on Aaron Rodgers and the red-hot Green Bay Packers. However, despite a big day from Philip Rivers throwing for 503 yards, it wasn't enough to stun the Packers in Lambeau and they would go on to lose, 27-20.

With the close loss, the Chargers drop to 2-4.

==== Week 7: vs. Oakland Raiders ====
Week Seven: Oakland Raiders at San Diego Chargers – Game summary

Quarter	1	2	3	4	Total
**Raiders**	10	20	7	0	**37**
Chargers	3	3	0	23	**29**

at Qualcomm Stadium, San Diego, California

- Date: October 25
- Game time: 1:05 pm. PDT
- Game weather: 77 °F (25 °C), sunny
- Game attendance: 67,542
- Referee: Jerome Boger
- TV announcers (CBS): Andrew Catalon, Steve Beuerlein and Steve Tasker
- Recap, Gamebook

Game information

**First quarter**

- OAK – Latavius Murray 1-yard run (Sebastian Janikowski kick), 12:46. Raiders 7–0. **Drive: 2 plays, 2 yards, 0:41.**
- OAK – Sebastian Janikowski 29-yard field goal, 5:21. Raiders 10–0. **Drive: 11 plays, 44 yards, 5:50.**
- SDG – Josh Lambo 40-yard field goal, 1:18. Raiders 10–3. **Drive: 8 plays, 57 yards, 4:03.**

**Second quarter**

- OAK – Clive Walford 23-yard pass from Derek Carr (Sebastian Janikowski kick), 13:06. Raiders 17–3. **Drive: 6 plays, 77 yards, 3:12.**
- OAK – Sebastian Janikowski 32-yard field goal, 9:28. Raiders 20–3. **Drive: 6 plays, 17 yards, 2:57.**
- OAK – Sebastian Janikowski 31-yard field goal, 4:41. Raiders 23–3. **Drive: 7 plays, 34 yards, 3:17.**
- OAK – Amari Cooper 52-yard pass from Derek Carr (Sebastian Janikowski kick), 1:01. Raiders 30–3. **Drive: 4 plays, 63 yards, 0:41.**
- SDG – Josh Lambo 44-yard field goal, 0:00. Raiders 30–6. **Drive: 9 plays, 54 yards, 1:01.**

**Third quarter**

- OAK – Michael Crabtree 25-yard pass from Derek Carr (Sebastian Janikowski kick), 10:41. Raiders 37–6. **Drive: 7 plays, 80 yards, 4:19.**

**Fourth quarter**

- SDG – Ladarius Green 31-yard pass from Philip Rivers (Josh Lambo kick), 12:58. Raiders 37–13. **Drive: 11 plays, 83 yards, 4:52.**
- SDG – Danny Woodhead 8-yard pass from Philip Rivers (Ladarius Green pass from Rivers), 6:00. Raiders 37–21. **Drive: 16 plays, 80 yards, 5:21.**
- SDG – Danny Woodhead 6-yard pass from Philip Rivers (Ladarius Green pass from Rivers), 0:06. Raiders 37–29. **Drive: 13 plays, 80 yards, 3:07.**

**Top passers**

- OAK – Derek Carr – 24/31, 289 yards, 3 TD
- SDG – Philip Rivers – 38/58, 336 yards, 3 TD, 2 INT

**Top rushers**

- OAK – Latavius Murray – 15 rushes, 85 yards, TD
- SDG – Branden Oliver – 9 rushes, 35 yards

**Top receivers**

- OAK – Amari Cooper – 5 receptions, 133 yards, TD
- SDG – Keenan Allen – 9 receptions, 89 yards

The Chargers would trail as much as 37-6 for most of the game. The Chargers would try to come back, and outscored Oakland 23-0 in the fourth quarter. However, it was not enough, as the Chargers lost 37-29. With the loss, the Chargers fell to 2-5.

==== Week 8: at Baltimore Ravens ====
Week Eight: San Diego Chargers at Baltimore Ravens – Game summary

Quarter	1	2	3	4	Total
Chargers	3	13	7	3	**26**
**Ravens**	6	7	6	10	**29**

at M&T Bank Stadium, Baltimore, Maryland

- Date: November 1
- Game time: 1:00 pm. EST/10:00 am. PST
- Game weather: 63 °F (17 °C), cloudy
- Game attendance: 70,829
- Referee: Gene Steratore
- TV announcers (CBS): Greg Gumbel, Trent Green and Jamie Erdahl
- Recap, Gamebook

Game information

**First quarter**

- BAL – Justin Tucker 48-yard field goal, 9:54. Ravens 3–0. **Drive: 8 plays, 31 yards, 3:15.**
- SDG – Josh Lambo 42-yard field goal, 5:44. Tied 3–3. **Drive: 9 plays, 56 yards, 4:10.**
- BAL – Justin Tucker 29-yard field goal, 2:36. Ravens 6–3. **Drive: 8 plays, 70 yards, 3:08.**

**Second quarter**

- SDG – Malcom Floyd 9-yard pass from Philip Rivers (Josh Lambo kick), 10:16. Chargers 10–6. **Drive: 13 plays, 80 yards, 7:20.**
- BAL – Crockett Gillmore 3-yard pass from Joe Flacco (Justin Tucker kick), 4:54. Ravens 13–10. **Drive: 11 plays, 80 yards, 5:22.**
- SDG – Keenan Allen 13-yard pass from Philip Rivers (kick blocked), 0:09. Chargers 17–13. **Drive: 14 plays, 80 yards, 4:45.**

**Third quarter**

- BAL – Justin Tucker 48-yard field goal, 11:11. Chargers 17–16. **Drive: 6 plays, 45 yards, 3:49.**
- SDG – Malcom Floyd 70-yard pass from Philip Rivers (Josh Lambo kick), 2:54. Chargers 24–16. **Drive: 3 plays, 70 yards, 0:24.**
- BAL – Justin Tucker 45-yard field goal, 0:00. Chargers 24–19. **Drive: 10 plays, 53 yards, 2:54.**

**Fourth quarter**

- BAL – Joe Flacco 1-yard run (Justin Tucker kick), 4:34. Ravens 27–24. **Drive: 6 plays, 38 yards, 2:56.**
- SDG – Josh Lambo 49-yard field goal, 2:27. Tied 27–27. **Drive: 8 plays, 49 yards, 2:07.**
- BAL – Justin Tucker 39-yard field goal, 0:00. Ravens 30–27. **Drive: 9 plays, 59 yards, 2:27.**

**Top passers**

- SDG – Philip Rivers – 28/37, 301 yards, 3 TD
- BAL – Joe Flacco – 25/37, 319 yards, TD

**Top rushers**

- SDG – Melvin Gordon – 18 rushes, 54 yards
- BAL – Justin Forsett – 17 rushes, 69 yards

**Top receivers**

- SDG – Malcom Floyd – 4 receptions, 92 yards, 2 TD
- BAL – Steve Smith, Sr. – 5 receptions, 82 yards

The 1-6 Ravens took down the Chargers after Justin Tucker nailed the game winning 39-yard field goal as time expired. With the loss, the Chargers fell to 2-6.

==== Week 9: vs. Chicago Bears ====
Week Nine: Chicago Bears at San Diego Chargers – Game summary

Quarter	1	2	3	4	Total
**Bears**	0	7	0	15	**22**
Chargers	7	9	0	3	**19**

at Qualcomm Stadium, San Diego, California

- Date: November 9
- Game time: 5:30 pm. PST
- Game weather: 63 °F (17 °C), cloudy
- Game attendance: 68,033
- Referee: Craig Wrolstad
- TV announcers (ESPN): Mike Tirico, Jon Gruden and Lisa Salters
- Recap, Gamebook

Game information

**First quarter**

- SDG – Danny Woodhead 14-yard pass from Philip Rivers (Josh Lambo kick), 6:50. Chargers 7–0. **Drive: 8 plays, 63 yards, 4:42.**

**Second quarter**

- SDG – Jason Verrett 68-yard interception return (kick failed), 9:58. Chargers 13–0.
- CHI – Martellus Bennett 1-yard pass from Jay Cutler (Robbie Gould kick), 6:53. Chargers 13–7. **Drive: 7 plays, 80 yards, 3:05.**
- SDG – Josh Lambo 31-yard field goal, 0:03. Chargers 16–7. **Drive: 11 plays, 81 yards, 2:03.**

**Third quarter**

- No scoring plays.

**Fourth quarter**

- CHI – Jeremy Langford 1-yard run (Robbie Gould kick), 14:02 Chargers 16–14. **Drive: 15 plays, 93 yards, 8:16.**
- SDG – Josh Lambo 22-yard field goal, 7:53. Chargers 19–14. **Drive: 14 plays, 76 yards, 6:09.**
- CHI – Zach Miller 25-yard pass from Jay Cutler (Robbie Gould kick), 3:19. Bears 22–19. **Drive: 10 plays, 80 yards, 4:34.**

**Top passers**

- CHI – Jay Cutler, 27/40, 345 yards, 2 TD, INT
- SDG – Philip Rivers, 26/42, 280 yards, TD

**Top rushers**

- CHI – Jeremy Langford, 18 rushes, 72 yards, TD
- SDG – Danny Woodhead, 6 rushes, 33 yards

**Top receivers**

- CHI – Alshon Jeffery, 10 receptions, 151 yards
- SDG – Stevie Johnson, 7 receptions, 68 yards

For the second time this season, the Chargers home opponent's fans seemed to outnumber their own fans, as Bears fans were heard for most of the game. The Chargers would lead for most of the game. However, the Bears would go down to take the lead on a Zach Miller touchdown. Miller had to go airborne and made the catch with one hand. The grab would seal the win for the Bears. With the loss, the Chargers fell to 2-7 and they finished 1-3 against the NFC North.

==== Week 11: vs. Kansas City Chiefs ====
Week Eleven: Kansas City Chiefs at San Diego Chargers – Game summary

Quarter	1	2	3	4	Total
**Chiefs**	6	6	7	14	**33**
Chargers	0	3	0	0	**3**

at Qualcomm Stadium, San Diego, California

- Date: November 22
- Game time: 1:05 pm. PST
- Game weather: 87 °F (31 °C), sunny
- Game attendance: 65,837
- Referee: Carl Cheffers
- TV announcers (CBS): Spero Dedes and Solomon Wilcots
- Recap, Gamebook

Game information

**First quarter**

- KC – Dontari Poe 1-yard run (kick failed), 2:09. Chiefs 6–0. **Drive: 9 plays, 71 yards, 5:26.**

**Second quarter**

- SDG – Josh Lambo 52-yard field goal, 12:09. Chiefs 6–3. **Drive: 11 plays, 46 yards, 5:00.**
- KC – Cairo Santos 28-yard field goal, 5:53. Chiefs 9–3. **Drive: 11 plays, 70 yards, 6:16.**
- KC – Cairo Santos 24-yard field goal, 0:03. Chiefs 12–3. **Drive: 9 plays, 80 yards, 2:14.**

**Third quarter**

- KC – Justin Houston 17-yard interception return (Cairo Santos kick), 3:27. Chiefs 19–3.

**Fourth quarter**

- KC – Spencer Ware 3-yard run (Cairo Santos kick), 6:11. Chiefs 26–3. **Drive: 6 plays, 77 yards, 3:39.**
- KC – Spencer Ware 3-yard run (Cairo Santos kick), 2:32. Chiefs 33–3. **Drive: 3 plays, 24 yards, 1:41.**

**Top passers**

- KC – Alex Smith – 20/25, 253 yards
- SDG – Philip Rivers – 19/30, 178 yards, INT

**Top rushers**

- KC – Spencer Ware – 11 rushes, 96 yards, 2 TD
- SDG – Melvin Gordon – 15 rushes, 37 yards

**Top receivers**

- KC – Albert Wilson – 4 receptions, 56 yards
- SDG – Stevie Johnson – 7 receptions, 54 yards

This game was originally going to be on Sunday Night Football, but was later changed to 4:25 after the Bengals-Cardinals game was flexed to Sunday Night. The Chiefs rattled the Chargers 33-3, and it was the first time the Chargers failed to score a touchdown since 2012 against the Falcons. With the loss, the Chargers fell to 2-8.

==== Week 12: at Jacksonville Jaguars ====
Week Twelve: San Diego Chargers at Jacksonville Jaguars – Game summary

Quarter	1	2	3	4	Total
**Chargers**	0	21	3	7	**31**
Jaguars	6	3	3	13	**25**

at EverBank Field, Jacksonville, Florida

- Date: November 29
- Game time: 1:00 pm. EST/10:00 am. PST
- Game weather: 75 °F (24 °C), sunny
- Game attendance: 59,477
- Referee: Jerome Boger
- TV announcers (CBS): Spero Dedes and Solomon Wilcots
- Recap, Gamebook

Game information

**First quarter**

- JAX – Jason Myers 22-yard field goal, 10:39. Jaguars 3–0. **Drive: 10 plays, 76 yards, 4:21.**
- JAX – Jason Myers 51-yard field goal, 4:43. Jaguars 6–0. **Drive: 8 plays, 53 yards, 3:41.**

**Second quarter**

- SDG – Dontrelle Inman 2-yard pass from Philip Rivers (Josh Lambo kick), 14:21. Chargers 7–6. **Drive: 7 plays, 63 yards, 1:37.**
- JAX – Jason Myers 27-yard field goal, 7:04. Jaguars 9–6. **Drive: 6 plays, 36 yards, 2:02.**
- SDG – Antonio Gates 9-yard pass from Philip Rivers (Josh Lambo kick), 1:50. Chargers 14–9. **Drive: 13 plays, 83 yards, 5:14.**
- SDG – Antonio Gates 12-yard pass from Philip Rivers (Josh Lambo kick), 0:45. Chargers 21–9. **Drive: 3 plays, 22 yards, 0:16.**

**Third quarter**

- JAX – Jason Myers 28-yard field goal, 10:03. Chargers 21–12. **Drive: 7 plays, 33 yards, 2:27.**
- SDG – Josh Lambo 28-yard field goal, 1:02. Chargers 24–12. **Drive: 13 plays, 56 yards, 6:30.**

**Fourth quarter**

- JAX – Julius Thomas 21-yard pass from Blake Bortles (Jason Myers kick), 10:58. Chargers 24–19. **Drive: 12 plays, 80 yards, 5:04.**
- SDG – Steve Johnson 5-yard pass from Philip Rivers (Josh Lambo kick), 4:45. Chargers 31–19. **Drive: 14 plays, 80 yards, 6:13.**
- JAX – Allen Robinson 8-yard pass from Blake Bortles (kick failed), 1:21. Chargers 31–25. **Drive: 2 plays, 14 yards, 0:09.**

**Top passers**

- SDG – Philip Rivers – 29/43, 300 yards, 4 TD
- JAX – Blake Bortles – 30/49, 329 yards, 2 TD, INT

**Top rushers**

- SDG – Melvin Gordon – 14 rushes, 60 yards
- JAX – T. J. Yeldon – 9 rushes, 36 yards

**Top receivers**

- SDG – Stevie Johnson – 7 receptions, 92 yards, TD
- JAX – Julius Thomas – 9 receptions, 116 yards, TD

The Chargers were able to hold off a comeback by the Jaguars in the fourth quarter, and the Chargers got their first road win of the season. With the win, San Diego went to 3-8.

==== Week 13: vs. Denver Broncos ====
Week Thirteen: Denver Broncos at San Diego Chargers – Game summary

Quarter	1	2	3	4	Total
**Broncos**	14	3	0	0	**17**
Chargers	0	3	0	0	**3**

at Qualcomm Stadium, San Diego, California

- Date: December 6
- Game time: 1:05 pm. PST
- Game weather: 78 °F (26 °C), sunny
- Game attendance: 68,631
- Referee: Walt Coleman
- TV announcers (CBS): Kevin Harlan, Rich Gannon and Scott Kaplan
- Recap, Gamebook

Game information

**First quarter**

- DEN – Demaryius Thomas 3-yard TD pass from Brock Osweiler (Brandon McManus kick), 11:15. Broncos 7–0. **Drive: 8 plays, 76 yards, 3:45.**
- DEN – Danny Trevathan 25-yard interception return (Brandon McManus kick), 0:04. Broncos 14–0.

**Second quarter**

- DEN – Brandon McManus 23-yard field goal, 5:26. Broncos 17–0. **Drive: 14 plays, 46 yards, 7:18.**
- SDG – Josh Lambo 51-yard field goal, 1:41. Broncos 17–3. **Drive: 9 plays, 47 yards, 3:45.**

**Third quarter**

- No scoring plays.

**Fourth quarter**

- No scoring plays.

**Top passers**

- DEN – Brock Osweiler – 16/26, 166 yards, TD, INT
- SDG – Philip Rivers – 18/35, 202 yards, INT

**Top rushers**

- DEN – Ronnie Hillman – 19 rushes, 56 yards
- SDG – Melvin Gordon – 12 rushes, 55 yards

**Top receivers**

- DEN – Demaryius Thomas – 6 receptions, 61 yards, TD
- SDG – Antonio Gates – 6 receptions, 50 yards

For the second time in 3 weeks, the Chargers would fail to score a touchdown, as they were only held to 3 points against a powerful Broncos defense. With the loss, the Chargers fell to 3-9.

==== Week 14: at Kansas City Chiefs ====
Week Fourteen: San Diego Chargers at Kansas City Chiefs – Game summary

Quarter	1	2	3	4	Total
Chargers	0	0	3	0	**3**
**Chiefs**	0	10	0	0	**10**

at Arrowhead Stadium, Kansas City, Missouri

- Date: December 13
- Game time: 12:00 pm. CST/10:00 am. PST
- Game weather: 61 °F (16 °C), cloudy with rain
- Game attendance: 72,314
- Referee: Pete Morelli
- TV announcers (CBS): Andrew Catalon, Steve Beuerlein and Steve Tasker
- Recap, Gamebook

Game information

**First quarter**

- No scoring plays.

**Second quarter**

- KC – Albert Wilson 44-yard pass from Alex Smith (Cairo Santos kick), 1:53. Chiefs 7–0. **Drive: 9 plays, 96 yards, 5:23.**
- KC – Cairo Santos 40-yard field goal, 0:02. Chiefs 10–0. **Drive: 4 plays, 39 yards, 0:27.**

**Third quarter**

- SDG – Josh Lambo 30-yard field goal, 5:47. Chiefs 10–3. **Drive: 10 plays, 52 yards, 6:22.**

**Fourth quarter**

- No scoring plays.

**Top passers**

- SDG – Philip Rivers – 24/43, 263 yards, INT
- KC – Alex Smith – 15/23, 191 yards, TD, INT

**Top rushers**

- SDG – Melvin Gordon – 14 rushes, 35 yards
- KC – Charcandrick West – 10 rushes, 54 yards

**Top receivers**

- SDG – Antonio Gates – 6 receptions, 76 yards
- KC – Albert Wilson – 4 receptions, 87 yards, TD

For the second time this season against the Chiefs, the Chargers did not score a touchdown. This game, however, was a lot closer, as the Chargers lost by a mere 7 points. With the loss, the Chargers fell to 3-10, eliminating them from the playoffs as a result. They were outscored in the season series with Kansas City 43-6.

==== Week 15: vs. Miami Dolphins ====
Week Fifteen: Miami Dolphins at San Diego Chargers – Game summary

Quarter	1	2	3	4	Total
Dolphins	0	0	7	7	**14**
**Chargers**	6	17	0	7	**30**

at Qualcomm Stadium, San Diego, California

- Date: December 20
- Game time: 1:25 pm. PST
- Game weather: 61 °F (16 °C), fair
- Game attendance: 66,676
- Referee: John Hussey
- TV announcers (CBS): Andrew Catalon, Steve Beuerlein, Steve Tasker and Scott Kaplan
- Recap, Gamebook

Game information

**First quarter**

- SDG – Danny Woodhead 20-yard pass from Philip Rivers (kick failed), 4:16. Chargers 6–0. **Drive: 12 plays, 86 yards, 6:14.**

**Second quarter**

- SDG – Josh Lambo 28-yard field goal, 9:05. Chargers 9–0. **Drive: 8 plays, 52 yards, 4:12.**
- SDG – Danny Woodhead 2-yard run (Josh Lambo kick), 4:18. Chargers 16–0. **Drive: 6 plays, 63 yards, 3:09.**
- SDG – Danny Woodhead 9-yard pass from Philip Rivers (Josh Lambo kick), 0:39. Chargers 23–0. **Drive: 9 plays, 75 yards, 2:28.**

**Third quarter**

- MIA – Jay Ajayi 12-yard run (Andrew Franks kick), 1:30. Chargers 23–7. **Drive: 6 plays, 62 yards, 2:09.**

**Fourth quarter**

- SDG – Danny Woodhead 9-yard pass from Philip Rivers (Josh Lambo kick), 4:14. Chargers 30–7. **Drive: 4 plays, 58 yards, 2:51.**
- MIA – Ryan Tannehill 1-yard run (Andrew Franks kick), 1:35. Chargers 30–14. **Drive: 14 plays, 82 yards, 2:39.**

**Top passers**

- MIA – Ryan Tannehill – 20/34, 216 yards
- SDG – Philip Rivers – 26/36, 311 yards, 3 TD, 2 INT

**Top rushers**

- MIA – Jay Ajayi – 6 rushes, 27 yards, TD
- SDG – Donald Brown – 12 rushes, 90 yards

**Top receivers**

- MIA – DeVante Parker – 4 receptions, 87 yards
- SDG – Antonio Gates – 6 receptions, 88 yards

The Chargers easily dominated the Dolphins, 30-14, to go to 4-10 in what some thought could've been the last game the Chargers played in San Diego. After the game, several Chargers players such as Philip Rivers, Eric Weddle, and Malcom Floyd, along with coach Mike McCoy returned to the field to greet and sign autographs for the fans. However, the team would stay in San Diego for the next season. The Chargers finished 3-5 at home.

==== Week 16: at Oakland Raiders ====
Week Sixteen: San Diego Chargers at Oakland Raiders – Game summary

Quarter	1	2	3	4	OT	Total
Chargers	7	10	0	3	0	**20**
**Raiders**	7	3	2	8	3	**23**

at O.co Coliseum, Oakland, California

- Date: December 24
- Game time: 5:25 pm. PST
- Game weather: 47 °F (8 °C), partly cloudy
- Game attendance: 54,400
- Referee: Carl Cheffers
- TV announcers (NFLN): Jim Nantz, Phil Simms and Tracy Wolfson
- Recap, Gamebook

Game information

**First quarter**

- SDG – Donald Brown 1-yard run (Josh Lambo kick), 9:09. Chargers 7–0. **Drive: 7 plays, 32 yards, 3:19.**
- OAK – Latavius Murray 22-yard run (Sebastian Janikowski kick), 3:27. Tied 7–7. **Drive: 9 plays, 77 yards, 5:42.**

**Second quarter**

- SDG – Dontrelle Inman 7-yard pass from Philip Rivers (Josh Lambo kick), 11:05. Chargers 14–7. **Drive: 6 plays, 33 yards, 3:43.**
- OAK – Sebastian Janikowski 50-yard field goal, 6:03. Chargers 14–10. **Drive: 11 plays, 44 yards, 5:02.**
- SDG – Josh Lambo 47-yard field goal, 0:31. Chargers 17–10. **Drive: 8 plays, 49 yards, 2:30.**

**Third quarter**

- OAK – Safety, Denico Autry sacked Philip Rivers in end zone, 2:10. Chargers 17–12.

**Fourth quarter**

- OAK – Michael Crabtree 3-yard pass from Derek Carr (Seth Roberts pass from Derek Carr), 4:42. Raiders 20–17. **Drive: 1 play, 3 yards, 0:05.**
- SDG – Josh Lambo 45-yard field goal, 0:55. Tied 20–20. **Drive: 11 plays, 53 yards, 3:47.**

**Overtime**

- OAK – Sebastian Janikowski 31-yard field goal, 8:05. Raiders 23–20. **Drive: 15 plays, 67 yards, 6:55.**

**Top passers**

- SDG – Philip Rivers – 31/49, 277 yards, TD
- OAK – Derek Carr – 23/38, 204 yards, TD, INT

**Top rushers**

- SDG – Danny Woodhead – 11 rushes, 55 yards
- OAK – Latavius Murray – 19 rushes, 79 yards, TD

**Top receivers**

- SDG – Dontrelle Inman – 8 receptions, 82 yards, TD
- OAK – Michael Crabtree – 6 receptions, 39 yards, TD

The Chargers would tie the game after Josh Lambo converted a 45-yard field goal attempt with 55 seconds remaining in regulation. In overtime, the Raiders would kick the go-ahead field goal on their first possession. The Chargers tried to go down the field to tie or win, but the comeback failed, and the Raiders held on for the win. With the loss, the Chargers fell to 4-11 and were swept by the Raiders for the first time since 2010.

==== Week 17: at Denver Broncos ====
Week Seventeen: San Diego Chargers at Denver Broncos – Game summary

Quarter	1	2	3	4	Total
Chargers	3	3	7	7	**20**
**Broncos**	7	0	7	13	**27**

at Sports Authority Field at Mile High, Denver, Colorado

- Date: January 3, 2016
- Game time: 2:25 p.m. MST/1:25 pm. PST
- Game weather: 50 °F (10 °C), mostly sunny
- Game attendance: 76,844
- Referee: Ron Torbert
- TV announcers (CBS): Jim Nantz, Phil Simms and Tracy Wolfson
- Recap, Gamebook

Game information

**First quarter**

- DEN – Demaryius Thomas 72-yard pass from Brock Osweiler (Brandon McManus kick), 14:29. Broncos 7–0. **Drive: 2 plays, 80 yards, 0:31.**
- SDG – Josh Lambo 50-yard field goal, 10:10. Broncos 7–3. **Drive: 10 plays, 48 yards, 4:19.**

**Second quarter**

- SDG – Josh Lambo 42-yard field goal, 5:52. Broncos 7–6. **Drive: 4 plays, 4 yards, 0:58.**

**Third quarter**

- SDG – Antonio Gates 13-yard pass from Philip Rivers (Josh Lambo kick), 8:18. Chargers 13–7. **Drive: 5 plays, 32 yards, 3:05.**
- DEN – C. J. Anderson 1-yard run (Brandon McManus kick), 5:24. Broncos 14–13. **Drive: 8 plays, 80 yards, 2:54.**

**Fourth quarter**

- DEN – Brandon McManus 48-yard field goal, 13:09. Broncos 17–13. **Drive: 7 plays, 32 yards, 2:20.**
- SDG – Tyrell Williams 80-yard pass from Philip Rivers (Josh Lambo kick), 12:58. Chargers 20–17. **Drive: 1 play, 80 yards, 0:11.**
- DEN – Brandon McManus 35-yard field goal, 9:45. Tied 20–20. **Drive: 7 plays, 63 yards, 3:13.**
- DEN – Ronnie Hillman 23-yard run (Brandon McManus kick), 4:44. Broncos 27–20. **Drive: 1 play, 23 yards, 0:06.**

**Top passers**

- SDG – Philip Rivers – 21/35, 228 yards, 2 TD, INT
- DEN – Brock Osweiler – 14/22, 232 yards, TD, 2 INT

**Top rushers**

- SDG – Donald Brown – 21 rushes, 81 yards
- DEN – Ronnie Hillman – 15 rushes, 117 yards, TD

**Top receivers**

- SDG – Tyrell Williams – 2 receptions, 90 yards, TD
- DEN – Demaryius Thomas – 5 receptions, 117 yards, TD

The Chargers went to Denver to try and prevent the Broncos from clinching home-field advantage throughout the AFC Playoffs. Despite forcing 5 turnovers, the Chargers failed to convert them into points, as their offense struggled all afternoon. Brock Osweiler would later be benched, and Peyton Manning would enter the game for Denver. The Chargers would have the lead twice in this game, but lost them both. The game was officially put away after Ronnie Hillman ran for 23 yards for a touchdown to put the Broncos ahead for good. With the loss, the Chargers ended their season at 4-12, and also finished 0-6 against the AFC West and 1-7 on the road.

== Standings ==
=== Division ===
AFC West
	W	L	T	PCT	DIV	CONF	PF	PA	STK
^{(1)} Denver Broncos	12	4	0	.750	4–2	8–4	355	296	W2
^{(5)} Kansas City Chiefs	11	5	0	.688	5–1	10–2	405	287	W10
Oakland Raiders	7	9	0	.438	3–3	7–5	359	399	L1
San Diego Chargers	4	12	0	.250	0–6	3–9	320	398	L2

=== Conference ===
AFC
#	Team	Division	W	L	T	PCT	DIV	CONF	SOS	SOV	STK
Division Leaders
1 (Note: Denver finished ahead of New England and Cincinnati for the No. 1 seed based on head-to-head sweep. New England finished ahead of Cincinnati for the No. 2 seed based on record vs. common opponents — New England's cumulative record against Buffalo, Denver, Houston and Pittsburgh was 4–1, while Cincinnati's cumulative record against the same four teams was 2–3.)	Denver Broncos	West	12	4	0	.750	4–2	8–4	.500	.479	W2
2	New England Patriots	East	12	4	0	.750	4–2	9–3	.473	.448	L2
3	Cincinnati Bengals	North	12	4	0	.750	5–1	9–3	.477	.406	W1
4	Houston Texans	South	9	7	0	.563	5–1	7–5	.496	.410	W3
Wild Cards
5	Kansas City Chiefs	West	11	5	0	.688	5–1	10–2	.496	.432	W10
6 (Note: Pittsburgh finished ahead of the New York Jets for the No. 6 seed and qualified for the last playoff spot based on record vs. common opponents — Pittsburgh's cumulative record against Cleveland, Indianapolis, New England and Oakland was 4–1, while the Jets' cumulative record against the same four teams was 3–2.)	Pittsburgh Steelers	North	10	6	0	.625	3–3	7–5	.504	.463	W1
Did not qualify for the postseason
7	New York Jets	East	10	6	0	.625	3–3	7–5	.441	.388	L1
8 (Note: Buffalo finished ahead of Indianapolis based on head-to-head victory.)	Buffalo Bills	East	8	8	0	.500	4–2	7–5	.508	.438	W2
9	Indianapolis Colts	South	8	8	0	.500	4–2	6–6	.500	.406	W2
10	Oakland Raiders	West	7	9	0	.438	3–3	7–5	.512	.366	L1
11	Miami Dolphins	East	6	10	0	.375	1–5	4–8	.469	.469	W2
12 (Note: Jacksonville finished ahead of Baltimore based on head-to-head victory.)	Jacksonville Jaguars	South	5	11	0	.313	2–4	5–7	.473	.375	L3
13	Baltimore Ravens	North	5	11	0	.313	3–3	4–8	.508	.425	L1
14	San Diego Chargers	West	4	12	0	.250	0–6	3–9	.527	.328	L2
15 (Note: Cleveland finished ahead of Tennessee based on head-to-head victory.)	Cleveland Browns	North	3	13	0	.188	1–5	2–10	.531	.271	L3
16	Tennessee Titans	South	3	13	0	.188	1–5	1–11	.492	.375	L4
Tiebreakers (Note: When breaking ties for three or more teams under the NFL's rules, they are first broken within divisions, then comparing only the highest ranked remaining team from each division.)
