= Tyrie =

Tyrie is a surname, and is less commonly used as a given name. Notable people with the surname name include:

- Andrew Tyrie (born 1957), British politician
- Andy Tyrie (1940–2025), Ulster (Northern Ireland) loyalist
- Harold Tyrie (1915–2007), New Zealand athlete
- James Tyrie (1543–1597), Scottish Jesuit theologian
- Kat Tyrie, Australian musician and producer

== See also ==
- Tyree (disambiguation), includes list of people with surname Tyree
