= Lady Baltimore cake =

Type of layer cake

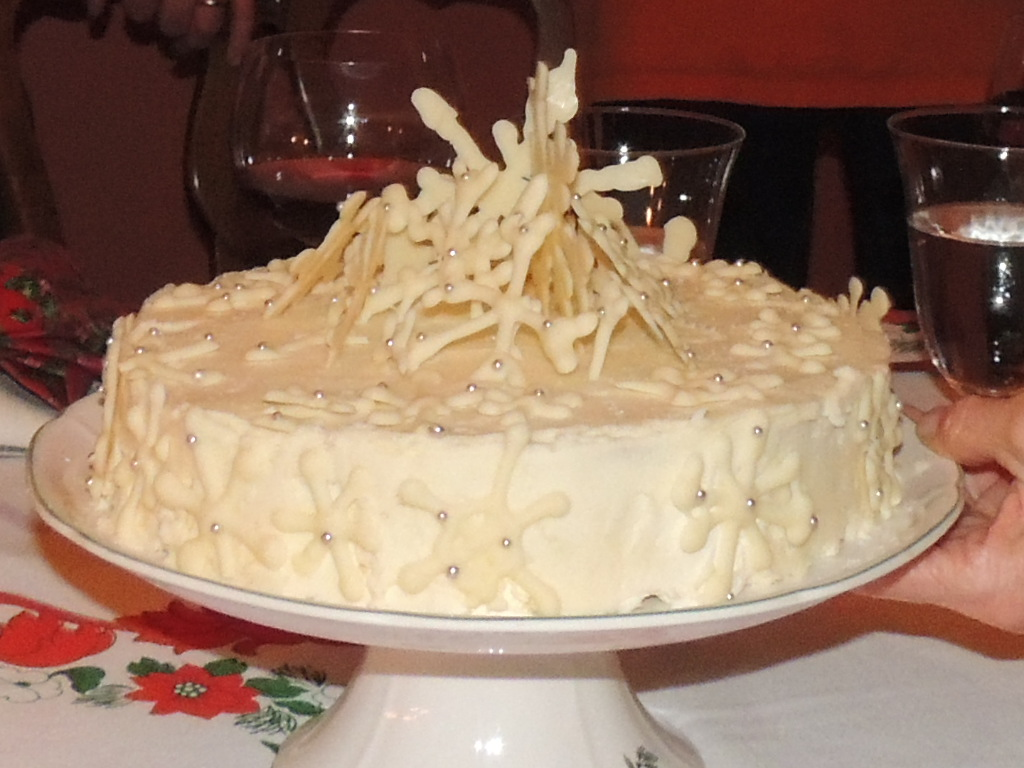
- Type: Cake
- Course: Dessert
- Place of origin: United States
- Region or state: American South
- Main ingredients: Sponge cake, meringue, raisins, figs, cherries, walnuts, pecans
- Variations: Lord Baltimore cake

A Lady Baltimore cake is an American white layer cake with fluffy frosting and a fruit and nut filling. The cake is believed to have been created in the Southern United States in the early 20th century, but its exact origins are disputed.

== History ==
The most popular legend of the Lady Baltimore is that Alicia Rhett Mayberry, a Southern belle, baked and served the cake to novelist Owen Wister in Charleston, South Carolina. Wister was said to have been so enamored with the cake that he used it as the namesake of his novel, Lady Baltimore.

Wister included a description of the cake in Lady Baltimore:

"I should like a slice, if you please, of Lady Baltimore," I said, with extreme formality ... I returned to the table and I had my first felicitous meeting with Lady Baltimore. Oh, my goodness! Did you ever taste it? It's all soft, and it's in layers, and it has nuts—but I can't write any more about it; my mouth waters too much.
Delighted surprise caused me once more to speak aloud and with my mouth full. "But, dear me, this is delicious!"

According to food historians, the cake may have actually originated with Florence and Nina Ottolengui, the longtime managers of Charleston's Lady Baltimore Tea Room, who developed the cake based on a version of the common Queen cake from the late nineteenth century. The Ottolenguis are said to have annually baked and shipped a cake to Owen Wister as a "thanks" for making their creation famous, and were known to ship hundreds of cakes around the country at Christmastime. The cake is currently made by Charleston's Sugar Bakeshop.

The first recorded mentions of a cake with the name of "Lady Baltimore" began appearing in 1906, with several newspaper articles referring to it as the "famous" or "original" cake.

== Recipe ==
The first printings of the recipe were copied in several newspapers, including Harrisburg, Pennsylvania's Daily Gazette and Bulletin, The Columbus Journal, and The Washington Times, in 1906:

Beat the whites of six eggs. Take a cup and a half of granulated sugar, a cup of milk, nearly a cup of butter, three cups of flour and two teaspoonfuls of good baking powder. Sift the flour and baking powder together into the other ingredients, adding the eggs last of all. Bake in two buttered pans for fifteen or twenty minutes.
For the frosting: Two cups of granulated sugar and a cup and a half of water, boil until stringy, about five minutes usually does it. Beat the whites of two eggs very light, and pour the boiling sugar slowly into it, mixing well. Take out of this enough for the top and sides of the cake, and stir into the remainder for the filling between the two layers, one cup of finely chopped raisins and a cup of chopped nuts. This is delicious when properly baked.

Modern versions of the recipe may call for a meringue, boiled, or seven-minute frosting, and may include rum or liqueurs in the filling. The cake itself may be white or yellow. There is also a version known as the "Lord Baltimore cake" made with the leftover egg yolks instead of whites.

== See also ==
- List of cakes
- Robert E. Lee cake
