= Tyree, Georgia =

Unincorporated community in Georgia, U.S.

Coordinates: 33°36′54″N 84°52′46″W

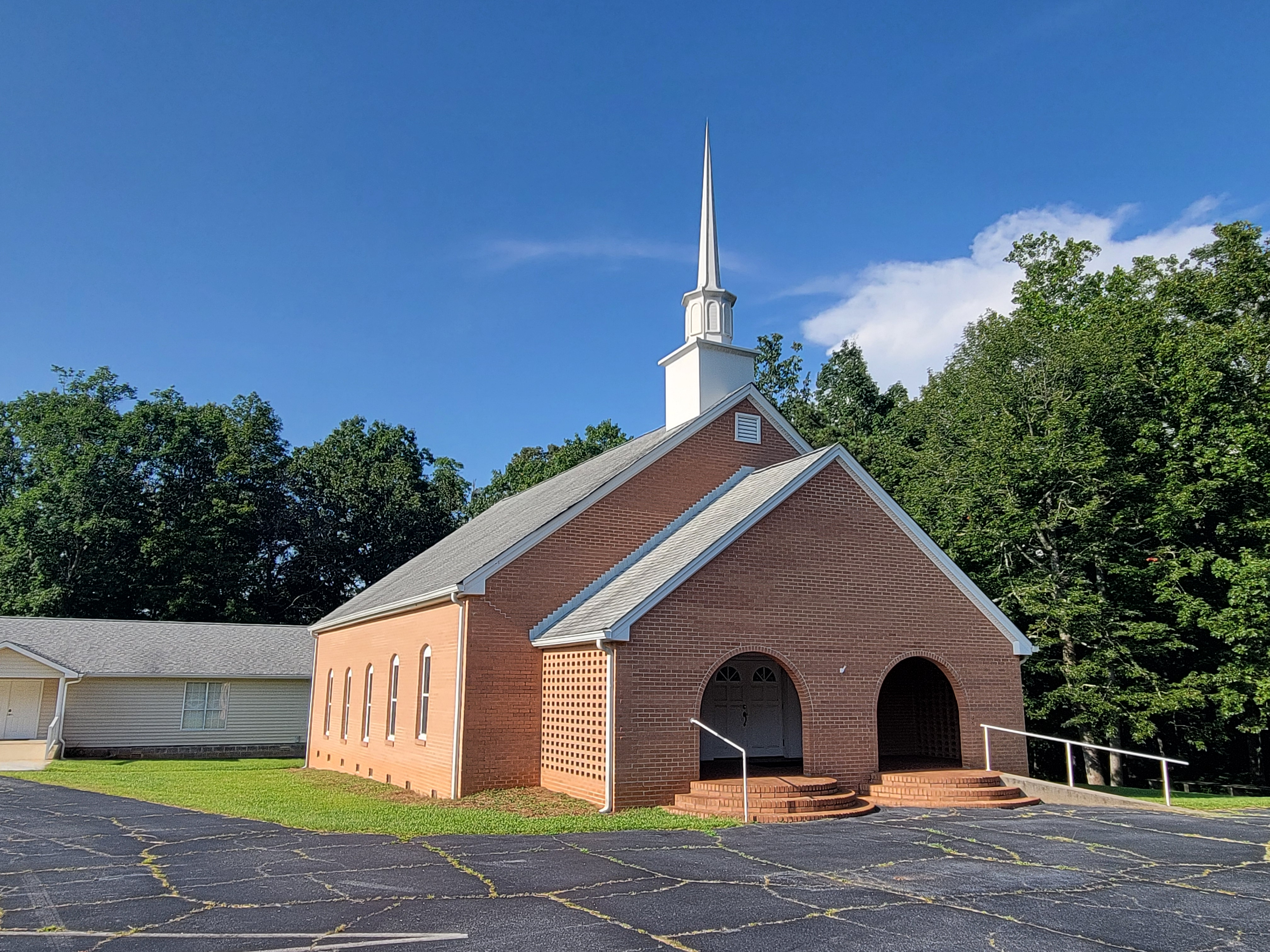
Friendship Baptist Church

Tyree is an unincorporated community in Douglas County, in the U.S. state of Georgia.

== History ==
A variant name was "Tyre". The community's name is derived from Tyre, Lebanon. A post office called Tyre was established in 1883, and remained in operation until 1904.
