= John A. Tyree =

John Augustine Tyree Jr
- Born: October 3, 1911; Blackstone, Virginia
- Died: April 8, 2004 (aged 92); La Jolla, California
- Burial place: Arlington National Cemetery
- Alma mater: United States Naval Academy
- Relatives: Alexander K. Tyree (Brother)
- Military career
- Allegiance: United States of America
- Branch: United States Navy
- Service years: 1933–1971
- Rank: Vice Admiral
- Service number: 0-72361
- Commands: USS Finback (SS-230); USS Botetourt; United States Naval Forces Korea; United States European Command
- Conflicts: World War II
- Awards: Navy Cross (2); DSM; Silver Star; Legion of Merit (2)

John Augustine Tyree Jr. (3 October 1911 – 8 April 2004), was a decorated submarine commander during World War II who reached the rank of Vice Admiral in the United States Navy.

He was born in born in Blackstone, Virginia.

He graduated from the Submarine School in 1943 and on 23 February 1943 he assumed command of USS Finback. He commanded Finback on its fourth through eighth war patrols and was awarded two Navy Crosses for his actions in command which he relinquished on 16 May 1944. He was then appointed as naval aide to President Franklin D. Roosevelt and continued to serve as aide to President Harry S. Truman attending the Yalta Conference with him.

Rear Admiral Tyree was placed in command of the combined Latin America-U.S. Task Force 137, the Naval quarantine of Cuba during the Cuban Missile Crisis.
