= Evans Tyree =

Doctor and Methodist Bishop in the A.M.E. Church

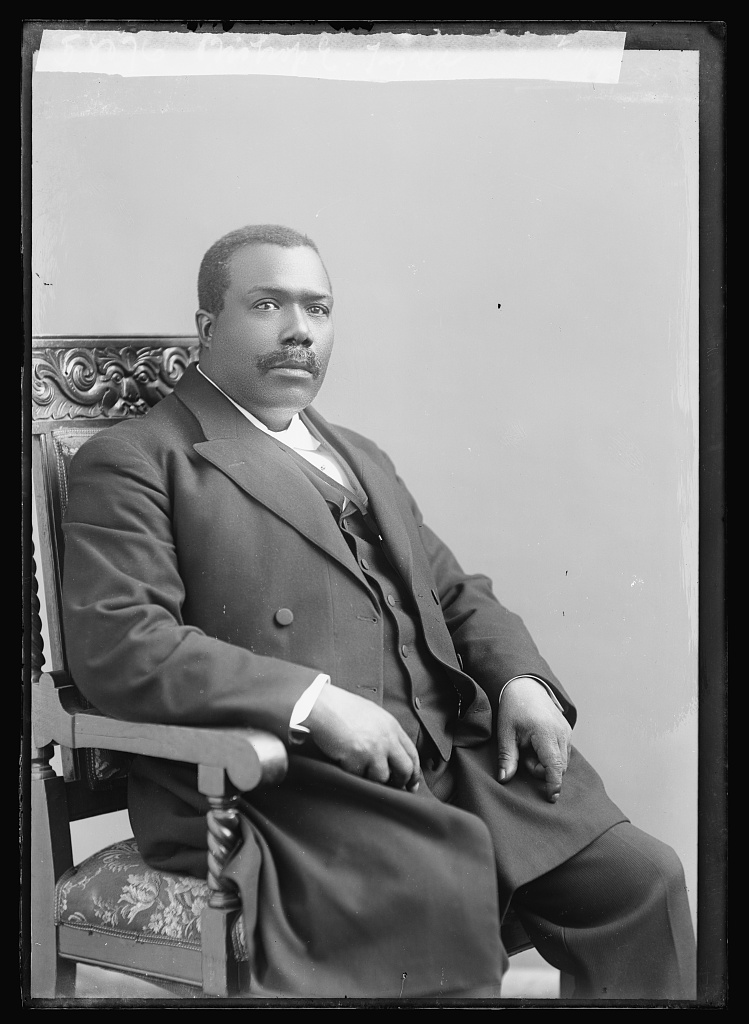
- Tyree in the early 1900s
- Born: August 19, 1854
- Died: November 12, 1920 (aged 66)

Bishop Evans Tyree (August 19, 1854 - November 12, 1920) was a doctor and Bishop in the A.M.E. Church in Nashville Tennessee.

== Early life and education ==
Tyree was born enslaved in DeKalb County, Tennessee. In 1865 after emancipation he and his mother lived and worked on a farm in a DeKalb County. He learned to read in 1866 and shortly thereafter joined the Methodist Church. He was "licensed to preach at fourteen, joined the conference at eighteen, and was made elder at twenty-two." He attended Central Tennessee College for six years, graduating as valedictorian in 1883 then continuing on for two more years and attending Meharry Medical College. He received his MD in Louisville, Kentucky in 1894.

== African Methodist Episcopal Church ==
Tyree had been preaching since 1868, often having to do farm work to support his family while also preaching. In 1900 he was elected bishop in Columbus, Ohio, the Senior Bishop of the five Bishops elected at that General Conference. He was originally in charge of the Eighth Episcopal District of the Church which covered Mississippi and Arkansas and then moved on to the Tenth District, the "Texas Conference," which encompassed Indian Mission, Oklahoma Territory, Central Texas, Texas and West Texas. He was a delegate to the Ecumenical Conference of Methodism in London in 1901. In 1912 he was listed as one of the compilers of the first edition of the Book of Discipline of the A.M.E. Church that was "edited, set, print and bound" by Black people.
