= Alexander K. Tyree =

American naval officer

- Tyree (right) is greeted by Vice-Admiral Charles A. Lockwood (COMSUBPAC) (left) on his return to Pearl on July 4, 1945
- Born: August 28, 1915; Page, West Virginia
- Died: May 10, 2006 (aged 90); Atlantic Beach, Florida
- Burial place: Arlington National Cemetery
- Education: United States Naval Academy; Duke University
- Relatives: Admiral John A. Tyree, Jr (Brother); John Washington (11th generation descendant)
- Military career
- Allegiance: United States of America
- Branch: United States Navy
- Service years: 1936–1966
- Rank: Captain
- Nickname: Alec
- Commands: USS R-2 (SS-79); USS Bowfin (SS-287); USS Piper; USS Sperry (AS-12)
- Conflicts: World War II
- Awards: Navy Cross (2); Silver Star; Legion of Merit; Bronze Star

Alexander Kelly Tyree (August 28, 1915 – May 10, 2006) was an American naval officer who served as a submarine commander during World War II and reached the rank of captain in the United States Navy.

He was awarded the Navy Cross twice for commanding successful submarine patrols attacking Japanese forces in 1945. After the war, he continued to serve in the navy and also taught naval science and mathematics at the universities of Washington and Mary Washington.

== Early life ==
Alexander Tyree was born in Page, West Virginia, on August 28, 1915, and grew up in Danville, Virginia. He graduated from the United States Naval Academy in Annapolis in 1936, following his brother John, who was in the class of 1933. Tyree was "the son of a notable Navy family."

== World War II ==
Prior to taking command of the USS Bowfin, Tyree served on the USS Guardfish as the Assistant Approach Officer, aiding in sinking 58,000 tons of shipping and was awarded the Silver Star. In December 1944, Tyree took command of Bowfin from John Corbus. On a war patrol lasting from January 25 to March 25, Bowfin sank a number of enemy vessels, including a destroyer, for which Tyree was awarded his first Navy Cross by Chester W. Nimitz. During that war patrol, Tyree and the crew of the USS Bowfin also provided lifeguard duty rescuing two downed pilots. Together with a flotilla of other submarines, Tyree and the crew of Bowfin took a heavy toll on Japanese shipping in the Sea of Japan in June 1945.Bowfin sank 6,300 tons of enemy shipping. These actions led to Commander Tyree being awarded his second Navy Cross.

In an interview two months after World War II ended, Tyree said, "The skipper of a sub is in closer touch with his men than the commander of a surface craft," adding, "Our crews are made up of the highest caliber men in the navy and I am proud to be associated with them. It was through their efforts that the submarine service proved so efficient in the destruction of enemy shipping."

== Citations ==
Tyree's first Naval Cross was given "for extraordinary heroism in the line of his profession as Commanding Officer of the U.S.S. BOWFIN (SS-287), on the SEVENTH War Patrol of that submarine during the period 25 January 1945 to 25 March 1945, in enemy controlled waters in the Sea of Japan. Courageously attacking all hostile ships contacted with torpedoes and gunfire, Commander Tyree sank a 1,400-ton destroyer and a 1,200-ton sea-truck, assisted in the sinking of a 200-ton picket boat and damaged another picket boat of 250 tons. In addition to this offensive patrol, he carried out lifeguard duties, rescuing two Naval aviators. By his skillful evasive tactics, he avoided enemy countermeasures and brought his vessel safe to port, and his gallant devotion to duty was in keeping with the highest traditions of the United States Naval Service."

His second Naval Cross was given "for extraordinary heroism in the line of his profession as Commanding Officer of the U.S.S. BOWFIN (SS-287), on the NINTH War Patrol of that submarine during the period 29 May 1945 to 4 July 1945, in enemy controlled waters of the Sea of Japan along the eastern coast of Korea. Penetrating strong anti-submarine barriers, Commander Tyree entered confined enemy harbors in an attempt to locate Japanese shipping and, launching torpedo attacks, succeeded in sinking two enemy freighters totaling 6,300 tons. Skillfully evading strong enemy countermeasures, he withdrew from the danger area and returned safe to port. His courage and devotion to duty reflect the highest credit upon Commander Tyree and the United States Naval Service."

== Postwar career ==
While still on active duty, Tyree taught as an associate professor of naval science at the University of Washington in Seattle, starting in 1948. Tyree retired after thirty years of military service, and began working on his graduate degree in mathematics at Duke University. After completing his master's degree in mathematics in 1967, Tyree taught at University of Mary Washington until 1979.

Tyree was involved with the creation of the USS Bowfin Submarine Museum and Park at Pearl Harbor and narrated the exhibit for the museum. Visitors to the museum who tour the submarine hear his recorded voice describing the Bowfin's passage though minefields while passing through the Tsushima Strait into the Sea of Japan in June 1945: "Every hour seemed like a year as we inched our way through the minefields, and every so often, the FM sonar would emit an eerie noise, and we knew there was a mine dangerously close by. Once we heard a mine cable scraping along the side of the hull." Tyree is one of 11 people who have annual scholarships named after them, which are conferred by the Pacific Fleet Submarine Memorial Association. This program has awarded $1.1 million in scholarships to submariners and their families in Hawaii since 1985.

== Personal life and death ==
Tyree's first wife was Sue Williams Tyree. He had roomed with her brother, Robert J. Williams, at Annapolis and Williams also saw action in the Pacific. Susan died in 1984 and he married Gloria who died in 2001. His third wife was Ethel, known as "Willi", who he married in his final years at Shell Point Retirement Community in Fort Myers, Florida. He died of lung cancer in 2006 and was survived by Ethel, his three children, three grandchildren and five great-grandchildren.
