= Tyreek Burwell =

American football player (born 1992)

No. 78, 65
- Position: Offensive tackle

Personal information
- Born: March 11, 1992 (age 34); Hempstead, New York, U.S.
- Listed height: 6 ft 6 in (1.98 m)
- Listed weight: 310 lb (141 kg)

Career information
- High school: Walt Whitman (Huntington Station, New York)
- College: Cincinnati
- NFL draft: 2015: undrafted

Career history
- San Diego / Los Angeles Chargers (2015–2016); Indianapolis Colts (2017); Philadelphia Eagles (2019)*
- * Offseason or practice squad member only

Career NFL statistics
- Games played: 17
- Stats at Pro Football Reference

Tyreek Burwell (born March 11, 1992) is an American former professional football player who was an offensive tackle in the National Football League (NFL). He signed with the San Diego Chargers in 2015 as an undrafted free agent. He played college football for the Cincinnati Bearcats.

== Professional career ==
=== San Diego / Los Angeles Chargers ===
After going undrafted in the 2015 NFL draft, Burwell signed with the San Diego Chargers on May 3, 2015. On September 10, he was waived, but signed to the practice squad two days later. He was promoted to the active roster on September 29.

On November 5, 2016, Burwell was released by the Chargers. Three days later, the Chargers signed Burwell to their practice squad. He was promoted to the active roster on November 14.

On September 2, 2017, Burwell was waived by the Chargers.

=== Indianapolis Colts ===
On September 11, 2017, Burwell was signed to Indianapolis Colts' practice squad. He was promoted to the active roster on November 2, 2017.

On September 1, 2018, Burwell was waived/injured by the Colts and was placed on injured reserve. He was released on September 5, 2018.

=== Philadelphia Eagles ===
On January 9, 2019, Burwell signed a reserve/future contract with the Philadelphia Eagles. On July 15, 2019, Burwell announced his retirement from the NFL.
