= Marion Cabell Tyree =

American author

Marion Cabell Tyree (Lynchburg, Virginia) was the author of the influential cookbook Housekeeping in Old Virginia (1877). A granddaughter of Patrick Henry, she compiled the recipes in her cookbook with the help of "two hundred and fifty of Virginia's noted housewives".

== Civil War legacy ==
Modern scholars of the culture of the Southern United States after the American Civil War have identified the rhetorical techniques used by Tyree to establish credibility for her book and its heritage. For instance, she lists the names of all those who contributed recipes; "they establish a pedigree for the book". Tyree explicitly staged the book as "a response to changes wrought on upper-class white households"; these recipes and household tips, she says, will help the "elegant and refined women" who may find themselves without a cook.
